= Max Cohen-Olivar =

Moroccan racing driver

- Nationality: (Morocco) Moroccan
- Born: 30 April 1945 Casablanca, Morocco
- Died: 21 May 2018 (aged 73) Paris, France

Max Mimoun Cohen-Olivar (30 April 1945 – 21 May 2018) was a Moroccan racing driver. He is considered to be one of the greatest Moroccan racing drivers of all time. He competed extensively in the prestigious 24 Hours of Le Mans race, and at the time of his final appearance in 2001 he was only the ninth driver to start the race 20 or more times. The others were Henri Pescarolo, Bob Wollek, Yojiro Terada, Derek Bell, François Migault, Claude Ballot-Léna, Claude Haldi and Pierre Yver.

== Le Mans ==
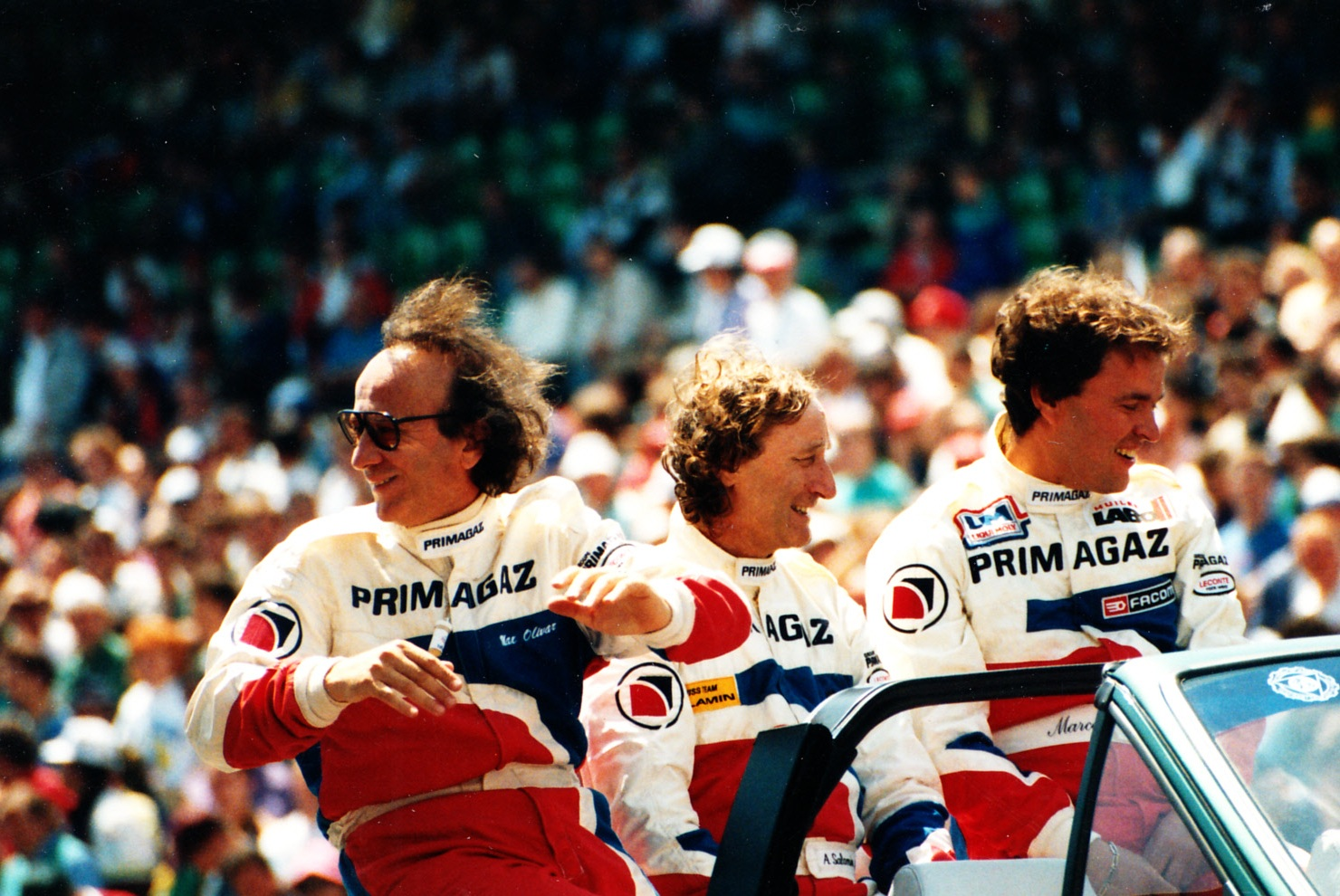
Cohen-Olivar (right) at Le Mans in 1991.

Cohen-Olivar's first appearance in the race was in 1971, when he partnered André Wicky in the Swiss driver's own Porsche 908. The gearbox failed in the 20th hour, with the pair in tenth place in the race and second in their class. The Wicky car failed to start the race the following year, but they had better luck in 1973 as they were joined by the Swiss driver Philippe Carron. The trio were the slowest of all the finishers, 21st on the road and ninth in class. For 1974, Wicky ran a De Tomaso Pantera for Cohen-Olivar and Carron, but the duo retired in the fourth hour of the race. In 1975 Cohen-Olivar drove the lead Wicky Porsche, alongside Carron and Frenchman Joël Brachet. They were uncompetitive again, before the clutch failed in the seventeenth hour, causing Cohen-Olivar's third retirement in four Le Mans entries.

Wicky entered a De Tomaso Pantera for Cohen-Olivar, Jacques Marché and Martial Delalande for the 1976 race but the trio did not start the race. In 1977 Cohen-Olivar joined the French ROC (Racing Organisation Course) entry, driving a Chevron B36 alongside Alain Flotard and Michel Dubois. The car once again failed to make the finish, dropping out in the 18th hour. ROC ran two B36s in 1978, and while the other car managed to win the S 2.0 class, the car Cohen-Olivar shared with Frenchmen Jacques Henry and Albert Dufrene suffered a similar fate to the previous year, again retiring in the eighteenth hour, this time with an engine failure.

For 1979 24 Hours of Le Mans, Cohen-Olivar joined up with a new French entry under the Lambretta banner, sharing a Lola T298 with Pierre Yver and Michel Elkoubi. This combination gave Cohen-Olivar his first finish since 1973, and even some silverware, as they finished 21st overall and third in the S 2.0 class.

Despite this success, the team did not enter the race again, and it wasn't until 1981 that Cohen-Olivar was able to race at Le Mans again. He again raced a T298, this time owned by Frenchman Jean-Marie Lemerle. The car was co-piloted by Lemerle and his fellow Frenchman Alain Levié. Another uncompetitive race for Cohen-Olivar ended in the seventeenth hour when the car's electrics failed. He remained with Lemerle in 1982, who with support from Italian firm Sivama Motor was able to run a new car, a Lancia Beta Monte Carlo. Levié was replaced in the team by American Joe Castellano, and the trio had much better luck than the previous year, with 12th overall and second in class. This 12th place would remain Cohen-Olivar's best ever result in the race.

== Racing record ==
=== Complete World Sportscar Championship results ===
(key) (Races in bold indicate pole position) (Races in italics indicate fastest lap)

Year	Entrant	Class	Chassis	Engine	1	2	3	4	5	6	7	8	9	10	11	12	13	14	15	Pos.	Pts
1970	Wicky Racing Team	S 2.0	Porsche 910	Porsche Typ 901/21 2.0 F6	DAY	SEB	BRH	MNZ	TGA	SPA	NÜR	LMS	GLN	ÖST; DNS						(Note: No drivers' Championship.)	
1971	Wicky Racing Team	P 3.0	Porsche 908/02	Porsche 908 3.0 F8	BUE	DAY	SEB	BRH	MNZ	SPA	TGA	NÜR	LMS; Ret	ÖST	GLN						
1972	Wicky Racing Team	S 3.0	Porsche 908/02	Porsche 908 3.0 F8	BUE	DAY	SEB	BRH	MNZ	SPA	TGA	NÜR	LMS; DNS	ÖST							
1973	Wicky Racing Team	S 3.0	Porsche 908/02	Porsche 908 3.0 F8	DAY	VAL	DIJ; 12	MNZ; Ret	SPA	TGA	NÜR	LMS; 21	ÖST	GLN							
1974	Supercar	S 2.0	Lola T294	Ford Cosworth FVC L4	MNZ; Ret	SPA	NÜR	IMO													
1974	Wicky Racing Team	GT	De Tomaso Pantera	Ford 5.8 V8					LMS; Ret	ÖST	GLN	LEC	BRH	KYA							
1977		S 2.0	Lola T294	Ford Cosworth BDG L4	DIJ	MNZ	VAL	PER	EST	LEC; Ret	IMO	SAL								(Note: In 1976 and 1977 the World Championship was divided into two series that ran simultaneously but separately: The World Sportscar Championship and the World Championship for Makes.)	
1979	Lambretta S.A.F.D.	S 2.0	Lola T298	BMW M12 2.0 L4	DAY	MUG	DIJ; Ret	SIL	NÜR	PER	GLN	BRH	VAL								
1980	Jean-Marie Lemerle	S 2.0	Lola T298	ROC-Chrysler-Simca 2.0 L4	DAY	BRH	MUG	MNZ	SIL	NÜR	LMS; DNQ	GLN	MOS	VAL	DIJ; DNS						
1981	Jean-Marie Lemerle	S 2.0	Lola T298	BMW M12 2.0 L4	DAY	SEB	MUG	MNZ	RSD	SIL	NÜR	LMS; Ret	PER	DAY	GLN	SPA	MOS	ROA	BRH	NC	0
1982	Jean-Marie Lemerle	Gr.5	Lancia Beta Monte Carlo	Lancia 1.4 L4t	MNZ	SIL	NÜR	LMS; 12	SPA	MUG	FUJ	BRH								NC	0
1983	Scuderia Sivama Motor	C	Lancia LC1	Lancia 1.4 L4t	MNZ	SIL	NÜR	LMS; NC	SPA	FUJ	KYA									NC	0
1984	Helmut Gall	B	BMW M1	BMW M88 3.5 L6	MNZ	SIL; Ret	LMS													NC	0
1984	Hubert Striebig	C2	Sthemo SMC2	BMW M88 3.5 L6				NÜR; NC			SPA; Ret	IMO; Ret	FUJ	KYA	SAN					NC	0
1984	John Bartlett	C1	Lola T610	Cosworth DFL 3.3 V8					BRH; 14	MOS										NC	0
1985	Bartlett Racing	C2	Chevron B62	Cosworth DFL 3.3 V8	MUG	MNZ	SIL	LMS; Ret	HOC; 16	MOS; Ret	SPA; Ret	BRH; Ret	FUJ	SHA						NC	0
1986	Bartlett Racing	C2	Chevron B62	Cosworth DFL 3.3 V8	MNZ; DNS															65th	3
1986	Bartlett Racing	C2	Bardon DB1	Cosworth DFL 3.3 V8		SIL; Ret			BRH; 18											65th	3
1986	Porsche Kremer Racing	C1	Porsche 956	Porsche Type 935/76 2.6 F6t			LMS; Ret	NOR												65th	3
1986	Roy Baker Racing Tiga	C2	Tiga GC285	Ford Cosworth BDT 1.8 L4t						JER; 10		SPA; Ret	FUJ							65th	3
1986	Roy Baker Racing Tiga	C2	Tiga GC286	Ford Cosworth BDT 1.8 L4t							NÜR; Ret									65th	3
1987	John Bartlett Racing	C2	Bardon DB1	Cosworth DFL 3.3 V8	JAR	JER; DNQ	MNZ													NC	0
1987	Roy Baker Racing	C2	Tiga GC286	Cosworth DFL 3.3 V8				SIL; Ret				NÜR; 15	SPA	FUJ						NC	0
1987	Charles Ivey Racing	C2	Tiga GC287	Porsche Type 935/76 2.6 F6t					LMS; Ret	NOR	BRH									NC	0
1988	Ark Racing	C2	Ceekar 83J-1	Ford Cosworth DFV 3.0 V8	JER; DNS															NC	0
1988	Swiss Team Salamin	C1	Porsche 962C	Porsche Type 935/79 2.8 F6t		JAR; 15		SIL; 7												NC	0
1988	Automobiles Louis Descartes	C2	ALD 04	BMW M88 3.5 L6			MNZ; Ret													NC	0
1988	Primagaz Competition	C2	Cougar C12	Cosworth DFL 3.3 V8					LMS; NC	BRN										NC	0
1988	Roy Baker Racing	C2	Tiga GC286	Cosworth DFL 3.3 V8							BRH; NC	NÜR	SPA; Ret	FUJ	SAN					NC	0
1989	Swiss Team Salamin	C1	Porsche 962C	Porsche Type 935 3.0 F6t	SUZ	DIJ; 22			NÜR; Ret	DON; 16	SPA; 16	MEX								NC	0
1989	Team Lee-Davey	C1	Porsche 962C	Porsche Type 935 3.0 F6t			JAR; 16	BRH												NC	0
1990	Swiss Team Salamin	C	Porsche 962C	Porsche Type 935 3.0 F6t	SUZ	MNZ	SIL	SPA	DIJ	NÜR; 20	DON; 19	CGV; 20	MEX; Ret							NC	0
1991	Swiss Team Salamin	C2	Porsche 962C	Porsche Type 935 3.2 F6t	SUZ; 9			LMS; Ret	NÜR	MAG	MEX	AUT								54th	2
1991	Swiss Team Salamin	C2	Porsche 962C	Porsche Type 935 3.0 F6t		MNZ; Ret	SIL; NC													54th	2
1992	Equipe Alméras-Chotard	C3	Porsche 962C	Porsche Type 935 3.0 F6t	MNZ	SIL	LMS; Ret	DON	SUZ	MAG										NC	0

Footnotes

=== 24 Hours of Le Mans results ===
Year	Team	Co-Drivers	Car	Class	Laps	Pos.	Class Pos.
1971	(Switzerland) Wicky Racing Team	(Switzerland) André Wicky	Porsche 908/02	P 3.0		DNF	DNF
1972	(Switzerland) Wicky Racing Team	(Switzerland) André Wicky (Switzerland) Walter Brun	Porsche 908/02	S 3.0	-	DNS	DNS
1973	(Switzerland) Wicky Racing Team	(Switzerland) André Wicky (Switzerland) Philippe Carron	Porsche 908/02	S 3.0	270	21st	9th
1974	(Switzerland) Wicky Racing Team	(Switzerland) Philippe Carron	De Tomaso Pantera-Ford	GT	16	DNF	DNF
1975	(Switzerland) Wicky Racing Team	(Switzerland) Philippe Carron (France) Joël Brachet	Porsche 908/02	S 3.0	161	DNF	DNF
1976	(Switzerland) Wicky Racing Team	(France) Jacques Marché (France) Martial Delalande	De Tomaso Pantera-Ford	GTX	-	DNS	DNS
1977	(France) Société R.O.C.	(France) Alain Flotard (France) Michel Dubois	Chevron B36-ROC-Chrysler	S 2.0	176	DNF	DNF
1978	(France) R.O.C. La Pierre du Nord	(France) Jacques Henry (France) Albert Dufrene	Chevron B36-ROC-Chrysler	S 2.0	195	DNF	DNF
1979	(France) Lambretta S.A.F.D.	(France) Pierre Yver (France) Michel Elkoubi	Lola T298-BMW	S 2.0	248	21st	**3rd**
1980	(France) Jean-Marie Lemerle	(France) Jean-Marie Lemerle	Lola T298-ROC-Talbot	S 2.0	-	DNQ	DNQ
1981	(France) Jean-Marie Lemerle	(France) Jean-Marie Lemerle (France) Alain Levié	Lola T298-BMW	S 2.0	104	DNF	DNF
1982	(France) Jean-Marie Lemerle	(France) Jean-Marie Lemerle (United States) Joe Castellano	Lancia Beta Monte Carlo	Gr.5	295	12th	**2nd**
1983	(Italy) Scuderia Sivama Motor	(Argentina) Oscar Larrauri (Italy) Massimo Sigala	Lancia LC1	C	217	NC	NC
1985	(United Kingdom) Goodmands Sound (United Kingdom) Bartlett Chevron Racing	(United Kingdom) Richard Jones (United Kingdom) Robin Smith	Chevron B62-Ford Cosworth	C2	19	DNF	DNF
1986	(Germany) Porsche Kremer Racing	(France) Pierre Yver (France) Hubert Striebig	Porsche 956	C1	160	DNF	DNF
1987	(United Kingdom) Charles Ivey Racing	(United Kingdom) John Cooper (United Kingdom) Tom Dodd-Noble	Tiga GC287-Porsche	C2	224	DNF	DNF
1988	(France) Primagaz Competition	(Belgium) Patrick de Radiguès	Cougar C12-Ford Cosworth	C2	273	NC	NC
1989	(United Kingdom) Tiga Race Team	(United Kingdom) John Sheldon (United Kingdom) Robin Donovan	Tiga GC289-Ford Cosworth	C2	126	DNF	DNF
1990	(United Kingdom) Team Davey	(Italy) Giovanni Lavaggi (United Kingdom) Tim Lee-Davey	Porsche 962C	C1	306	19th	19th
1991	(Switzerland) Team Salamin Primagaz	(Switzerland) Antoine Salamin (France) Marcel Tarrès	Porsche 962C	C2	101	DNF	DNF
1992	(France) Equipe Alméras-Chotard	(France) Jean-Marie Alméras (France) Jacques Alméras	Porsche 962C	C3	85	DNF	DNF
2000	(Germany) Seikel Motorsport	(Belgium) Michel Neugarten (Canada) Tony Burgess	Porsche 911 GT3-R	GT	302	18th	**3rd**
2001	(Germany) Seikel Motorsport	(Canada) Tony Burgess (New Zealand) Andrew Bagnall	Porsche 911 GT3-RS	GT	272	12th	6th
