= 1990 World Sports Prototype Championship =

Racing tournament

1990 World Sportscar Championship

Seasons
- ← 1989 1991 →

The 1990 World Sportscar Championship season was the 38th season of FIA World Sportscar Championship racing. It featured the 1990 FIA World Sports-Prototype Championship for Drivers and the 1990 FIA World Sports-Prototype Championship for Teams, both of which were contested over a series for cars running under the FIA's Group C formula. The series ran from 8 April 1990 to 7 October 1990 and was composed of nine races.

== Schedule ==
Rnd	Race	Circuit	Date
1	(Japan) Fuji Film Cup (480 km)	Suzuka Circuit	8 April
2	(Italy) Trofeo F. Caracciolo (480km)	Autodromo Nazionale Monza	29 April
3	(United Kingdom) Shell BRDC Empire Trophy (480 km)	Silverstone Circuit	20 May
4	(Belgium) Coupes de Spa (480km)	Circuit de Spa-Francorchamps	3 June
5	(France) Coupe de Dijon (480 km)	Dijon-Prenois	22 July
6	(Germany) ADAC Sportwagen Weltmeisterschaft (480km)	Nürburgring	19 August
7	(United Kingdom) Shell Donington Trophy (480 km)	Donington Park	2 September
8	(Canada) Players Ltée Mondial (480 km)	Circuit Gilles Villeneuve	23 September
9	(Mexico) Trofeo Hermanos Rodriguez (480 km)	Autodromo Hermanos Rodriguez	7 October

== Entries ==
Entrant	Car	Engine	Tyre	No.	Drivers	Rounds
(West Germany) Team Sauber-Mercedes	Mercedes-Benz C9; Mercedes-Benz C11	Mercedes-Benz M119 5.0 L Turbo V8	G	1	(France) Jean-Louis Schlesser	All
(West Germany) Team Sauber-Mercedes	Mercedes-Benz C9; Mercedes-Benz C11	Mercedes-Benz M119 5.0 L Turbo V8	G	1	(Italy) Mauro Baldi	All
(West Germany) Team Sauber-Mercedes	Mercedes-Benz C9; Mercedes-Benz C11	Mercedes-Benz M119 5.0 L Turbo V8	G	2	(West Germany) Jochen Mass	All
(West Germany) Team Sauber-Mercedes	Mercedes-Benz C9; Mercedes-Benz C11	Mercedes-Benz M119 5.0 L Turbo V8	G	2	(Austria) Karl Wendlinger	1–2, 4, 8
(West Germany) Team Sauber-Mercedes	Mercedes-Benz C9; Mercedes-Benz C11	Mercedes-Benz M119 5.0 L Turbo V8	G	2	(West Germany) Michael Schumacher	3, 5–6, 9
(West Germany) Team Sauber-Mercedes	Mercedes-Benz C9; Mercedes-Benz C11	Mercedes-Benz M119 5.0 L Turbo V8	G	2	(West Germany) Heinz-Harald Frentzen	7
(United Kingdom) Silk Cut Jaguar	Jaguar XJR-11	Jaguar JV6 3.5 L Turbo V6	G	3	(United Kingdom) Martin Brundle	All
(United Kingdom) Silk Cut Jaguar	Jaguar XJR-11	Jaguar JV6 3.5 L Turbo V6	G	3	(France) Alain Ferté	1–7
(United Kingdom) Silk Cut Jaguar	Jaguar XJR-11	Jaguar JV6 3.5 L Turbo V6	G	3	(Netherlands) Jan Lammers	8–9
(United Kingdom) Silk Cut Jaguar	Jaguar XJR-11	Jaguar JV6 3.5 L Turbo V6	G	4	(United Kingdom) Andy Wallace	All
(United Kingdom) Silk Cut Jaguar	Jaguar XJR-11	Jaguar JV6 3.5 L Turbo V6	G	4	(Netherlands) Jan Lammers	1–7
(United Kingdom) Silk Cut Jaguar	Jaguar XJR-11	Jaguar JV6 3.5 L Turbo V6	G	4	(United States) Davy Jones	8–9
(West Germany) Joest Racing	Porsche 962C	Porsche Type-935/82 3.0 L Turbo Flat-6; Porsche Type-935/82 3.2 L Turbo Flat-6	G	6	(France) Jean-Louis Ricci	2, 4–6
(West Germany) Joest Racing	Porsche 962C	Porsche Type-935/82 3.0 L Turbo Flat-6; Porsche Type-935/82 3.2 L Turbo Flat-6	G	6	(France) Henri Pescarolo	2, 4–5
(West Germany) Joest Porsche Racing	Porsche 962C	Porsche Type-935/82 3.0 L Turbo Flat-6; Porsche Type-935/82 3.2 L Turbo Flat-6	M	7	(France) Bob Wollek	All
(West Germany) Joest Porsche Racing	Porsche 962C	Porsche Type-935/82 3.0 L Turbo Flat-6; Porsche Type-935/82 3.2 L Turbo Flat-6	M	7	(West Germany) Frank Jelinski	All
(West Germany) Joest Porsche Racing	Porsche 962C	Porsche Type-935/82 3.0 L Turbo Flat-6; Porsche Type-935/82 3.2 L Turbo Flat-6	M	8	(United Kingdom) Jonathan Palmer	All
(West Germany) Joest Porsche Racing	Porsche 962C	Porsche Type-935/82 3.0 L Turbo Flat-6; Porsche Type-935/82 3.2 L Turbo Flat-6	M	8	(France) Henri Pescarolo	1
(West Germany) Joest Porsche Racing	Porsche 962C	Porsche Type-935/82 3.0 L Turbo Flat-6; Porsche Type-935/82 3.2 L Turbo Flat-6	M	8	(United Kingdom) Tiff Needell	2–3
(West Germany) Joest Porsche Racing	Porsche 962C	Porsche Type-935/82 3.0 L Turbo Flat-6; Porsche Type-935/82 3.2 L Turbo Flat-6	M	8	(United Kingdom) Derek Bell	4
(West Germany) Joest Porsche Racing	Porsche 962C	Porsche Type-935/82 3.0 L Turbo Flat-6; Porsche Type-935/82 3.2 L Turbo Flat-6	M	8	(United Kingdom) David Hobbs	5
(West Germany) Joest Porsche Racing	Porsche 962C	Porsche Type-935/82 3.0 L Turbo Flat-6; Porsche Type-935/82 3.2 L Turbo Flat-6	M	8	(West Germany) Hans-Joachim Stuck	6, 8–9
(West Germany) Joest Porsche Racing	Porsche 962C	Porsche Type-935/82 3.0 L Turbo Flat-6; Porsche Type-935/82 3.2 L Turbo Flat-6	M	8	(West Germany) Michael Bartels	7
(West Germany) Joest Porsche Racing	Porsche 962C	Porsche Type-935/82 3.0 L Turbo Flat-6; Porsche Type-935/82 3.2 L Turbo Flat-6	M G	9	(West Germany) "John Winter"	All
(West Germany) Joest Porsche Racing	Porsche 962C	Porsche Type-935/82 3.0 L Turbo Flat-6; Porsche Type-935/82 3.2 L Turbo Flat-6	M G	9	(Sweden) Stanley Dickens	1–6
(West Germany) Joest Porsche Racing	Porsche 962C	Porsche Type-935/82 3.0 L Turbo Flat-6; Porsche Type-935/82 3.2 L Turbo Flat-6	M G	9	(France) Henri Pescarolo	7–9
(West Germany) Porsche Kremer Racing	Porsche 962CK6; Porsche 962C	Porsche Type-935/82 3.0 L Turbo Flat-6	Y	10	(West Germany) Bernd Schneider	1–4, 6–9
(West Germany) Porsche Kremer Racing	Porsche 962CK6; Porsche 962C	Porsche Type-935/82 3.0 L Turbo Flat-6	Y	10	(Japan) Hideki Okada	1
(West Germany) Porsche Kremer Racing	Porsche 962CK6; Porsche 962C	Porsche Type-935/82 3.0 L Turbo Flat-6	Y	10	(South Africa) Sarel van der Merwe	2, 4–7
(West Germany) Porsche Kremer Racing	Porsche 962CK6; Porsche 962C	Porsche Type-935/82 3.0 L Turbo Flat-6	Y	10	(Sweden) Steven Andskär	3
(West Germany) Porsche Kremer Racing	Porsche 962CK6; Porsche 962C	Porsche Type-935/82 3.0 L Turbo Flat-6	Y	10	(Italy) Giovanni Lavaggi	5
(West Germany) Porsche Kremer Racing	Porsche 962CK6; Porsche 962C	Porsche Type-935/82 3.0 L Turbo Flat-6	Y	10	(West Germany) Jürgen Barth	8
(West Germany) Porsche Kremer Racing	Porsche 962CK6; Porsche 962C	Porsche Type-935/82 3.0 L Turbo Flat-6	Y	10	(Mexico) Tomas Lopez	9
(West Germany) Porsche Kremer Racing	Porsche 962CK6; Porsche 962C	Porsche Type-935/82 3.0 L Turbo Flat-6	Y D	11	(Japan) Kunimitsu Takahashi	1
(West Germany) Porsche Kremer Racing	Porsche 962CK6; Porsche 962C	Porsche Type-935/82 3.0 L Turbo Flat-6	Y D	11	(Japan) Kazuo Mogi	1
(West Germany) Porsche Kremer Racing	Porsche 962CK6; Porsche 962C	Porsche Type-935/82 3.0 L Turbo Flat-6	Y D	11	(United Kingdom) Anthony Reid	2–4, 6–7
(West Germany) Porsche Kremer Racing	Porsche 962CK6; Porsche 962C	Porsche Type-935/82 3.0 L Turbo Flat-6	Y D	11	(Sweden) Anders Olofsson	2, 4, 7
(West Germany) Porsche Kremer Racing	Porsche 962CK6; Porsche 962C	Porsche Type-935/82 3.0 L Turbo Flat-6	Y D	11	(Sweden) Eje Elgh	3, 6
(West Germany) Porsche Kremer Racing	Porsche 962CK6; Porsche 962C	Porsche Type-935/82 3.0 L Turbo Flat-6	D	19	(United Kingdom) Anthony Reid	5
(West Germany) Porsche Kremer Racing	Porsche 962CK6; Porsche 962C	Porsche Type-935/82 3.0 L Turbo Flat-6	D	19	(West Germany) Jürgen Barth	5
(France) Courage Compétition	Porsche 962C; Cougar C24S	Porsche Type-935/82 3.0 L Turbo Flat-6	G	12	(Japan) Kenji Takahashi	1
(France) Courage Compétition	Porsche 962C; Cougar C24S	Porsche Type-935/82 3.0 L Turbo Flat-6	G	12	(United Kingdom) Will Hoy	1
(France) Courage Compétition	Porsche 962C; Cougar C24S	Porsche Type-935/82 3.0 L Turbo Flat-6	G	12	(Switzerland) Bernard Thuner	2–6, 8
(France) Courage Compétition	Porsche 962C; Cougar C24S	Porsche Type-935/82 3.0 L Turbo Flat-6	G	12	(Greece) Costas Los	2–4
(France) Courage Compétition	Porsche 962C; Cougar C24S	Porsche Type-935/82 3.0 L Turbo Flat-6	G	12	(France) Michel Trollé	5–7, 9
(France) Courage Compétition	Porsche 962C; Cougar C24S	Porsche Type-935/82 3.0 L Turbo Flat-6	G	12	(France) Denis Morin	8
(France) Courage Compétition	Porsche 962C; Cougar C24S	Porsche Type-935/82 3.0 L Turbo Flat-6	G	12	(France) Pascal Fabre	9
(France) Courage Compétition	Porsche 962C; Cougar C24S	Porsche Type-935/82 3.0 L Turbo Flat-6	G	13	(France) Pascal Fabre	All
(France) Courage Compétition	Porsche 962C; Cougar C24S	Porsche Type-935/82 3.0 L Turbo Flat-6	G	13	(France) Lionel Robert	1, 5–6
(France) Courage Compétition	Porsche 962C; Cougar C24S	Porsche Type-935/82 3.0 L Turbo Flat-6	G	13	(Italy) Beppe Gabbiani	2
(France) Courage Compétition	Porsche 962C; Cougar C24S	Porsche Type-935/82 3.0 L Turbo Flat-6	G	13	(France) Michel Trollé	3–4, 7–9
(United Kingdom) Richard Lloyd Racing	Porsche 962C GTi	Porsche Type-935/82 3.0 L Turbo Flat-6; Porsche Type-935/82 3.2 L Turbo Flat-6	G	14	(West Germany) Manuel Reuter	All
(United Kingdom) Richard Lloyd Racing	Porsche 962C GTi	Porsche Type-935/82 3.0 L Turbo Flat-6; Porsche Type-935/82 3.2 L Turbo Flat-6	G	14	(Spain) Luis Pérez-Sala	1
(United Kingdom) Richard Lloyd Racing	Porsche 962C GTi	Porsche Type-935/82 3.0 L Turbo Flat-6; Porsche Type-935/82 3.2 L Turbo Flat-6	G	14	(United Kingdom) James Weaver	2–3, 5
(United Kingdom) Richard Lloyd Racing	Porsche 962C GTi	Porsche Type-935/82 3.0 L Turbo Flat-6; Porsche Type-935/82 3.2 L Turbo Flat-6	G	14	(Sweden) Steven Andskär	4, 6–8
(United Kingdom) Richard Lloyd Racing	Porsche 962C GTi	Porsche Type-935/82 3.0 L Turbo Flat-6; Porsche Type-935/82 3.2 L Turbo Flat-6	G	14	(United Kingdom) Perry McCarthy	9
(Switzerland) Brun Motorsport	Porsche 962C; Porsche 962C GTi	Porsche Type-935/82 3.0 L Turbo Flat-6; Porsche Type-935/82 3.2 L Turbo Flat-6	Y	15	(Argentina) Oscar Larrauri	All
(Switzerland) Brun Motorsport	Porsche 962C; Porsche 962C GTi	Porsche Type-935/82 3.0 L Turbo Flat-6; Porsche Type-935/82 3.2 L Turbo Flat-6	Y	15	(Belgium) Harald Huysman	All
(Switzerland) Brun Motorsport	Porsche 962C; Porsche 962C GTi	Porsche Type-935/82 3.0 L Turbo Flat-6; Porsche Type-935/82 3.2 L Turbo Flat-6	Y	16	(Switzerland) Walter Brun	All
(Switzerland) Brun Motorsport	Porsche 962C; Porsche 962C GTi	Porsche Type-935/82 3.0 L Turbo Flat-6; Porsche Type-935/82 3.2 L Turbo Flat-6	Y	16	(Spain) Jésus Pareja	All
(Switzerland) Brun Motorsport	Porsche 962C; Porsche 962C GTi	Porsche Type-935/82 3.0 L Turbo Flat-6; Porsche Type-935/82 3.2 L Turbo Flat-6	D Y	17	(South Africa) George Fouché	1
(Switzerland) Brun Motorsport	Porsche 962C; Porsche 962C GTi	Porsche Type-935/82 3.0 L Turbo Flat-6; Porsche Type-935/82 3.2 L Turbo Flat-6	D Y	17	(Sweden) Steven Andskär	1
(Switzerland) Brun Motorsport	Porsche 962C; Porsche 962C GTi	Porsche Type-935/82 3.0 L Turbo Flat-6; Porsche Type-935/82 3.2 L Turbo Flat-6	D Y	17	(Italy) Massimo Sigala	2–4, 9
(Switzerland) Brun Motorsport	Porsche 962C; Porsche 962C GTi	Porsche Type-935/82 3.0 L Turbo Flat-6; Porsche Type-935/82 3.2 L Turbo Flat-6	D Y	17	(Sweden) Eje Elgh	2
(Switzerland) Brun Motorsport	Porsche 962C; Porsche 962C GTi	Porsche Type-935/82 3.0 L Turbo Flat-6; Porsche Type-935/82 3.2 L Turbo Flat-6	D Y	17	(Switzerland) Bernard Santal	3–9
(Switzerland) Brun Motorsport	Porsche 962C; Porsche 962C GTi	Porsche Type-935/82 3.0 L Turbo Flat-6; Porsche Type-935/82 3.2 L Turbo Flat-6	D Y	17	(Switzerland) Walter Brun	5
(Switzerland) Brun Motorsport	Porsche 962C; Porsche 962C GTi	Porsche Type-935/82 3.0 L Turbo Flat-6; Porsche Type-935/82 3.2 L Turbo Flat-6	D Y	17	(West Germany) Otto Rensing	6
(Switzerland) Brun Motorsport	Porsche 962C; Porsche 962C GTi	Porsche Type-935/82 3.0 L Turbo Flat-6; Porsche Type-935/82 3.2 L Turbo Flat-6	D Y	17	(Spain) Jésus Pareja	8
(United Kingdom) Team Davey	Porsche 962C	Porsche Type-935/82 3.0 L Turbo Flat-6	D	19	(Australia) Vern Schuppan	1
(United Kingdom) Team Davey	Porsche 962C	Porsche Type-935/82 3.0 L Turbo Flat-6	D	19	(Sweden) Eje Elgh	1
(United Kingdom) Team Davey	Porsche 962C	Porsche Type-935/82 3.0 L Turbo Flat-6	D	19	(Italy) Fulvio Ballabio	2
(United Kingdom) Team Davey	Porsche 962C	Porsche Type-935/82 3.0 L Turbo Flat-6	D	19	(Italy) Bruno Giacomelli	2
(United Kingdom) Team Davey	Porsche 962C	Porsche Type-935/82 3.0 L Turbo Flat-6	D	19	(Italy) Giovanni Lavaggi	3–4
(United Kingdom) Team Davey	Porsche 962C	Porsche Type-935/82 3.0 L Turbo Flat-6	D	19	(United Kingdom) Tim Lee-Davey	3–4
(United Kingdom) Team Davey	Porsche 962C	Porsche Type-935/82 3.0 L Turbo Flat-6	D	20	(Mexico) Alfonso Toledano	1–3
(United Kingdom) Team Davey	Porsche 962C	Porsche Type-935/82 3.0 L Turbo Flat-6	D	20	(United Kingdom) Tim Lee-Davey	1–2, 5, 8
(United Kingdom) Team Davey	Porsche 962C	Porsche Type-935/82 3.0 L Turbo Flat-6	D	20	(Italy) Fulvio Ballabio	2
(United Kingdom) Team Davey	Porsche 962C	Porsche Type-935/82 3.0 L Turbo Flat-6	D	20	(Italy) Bruno Giacomelli	2
(United Kingdom) Team Davey	Porsche 962C	Porsche Type-935/82 3.0 L Turbo Flat-6	D	20	(United Kingdom) Paul Stott	3
(United Kingdom) Team Davey	Porsche 962C	Porsche Type-935/82 3.0 L Turbo Flat-6	D	20	(United Kingdom) Robin Smith	5
(United Kingdom) Team Davey	Porsche 962C	Porsche Type-935/82 3.0 L Turbo Flat-6	D	20	(United Kingdom) Val Musetti	7
(United Kingdom) Team Davey	Porsche 962C	Porsche Type-935/82 3.0 L Turbo Flat-6	D	20	(Italy) Giovanni Lavaggi	7
(United Kingdom) Team Davey	Porsche 962C	Porsche Type-935/82 3.0 L Turbo Flat-6	D	20	(Austria) Mercedes Stermitz	8
(United Kingdom) Team Davey	Porsche 962C	Porsche Type-935/82 3.0 L Turbo Flat-6	D	20	(Mexico) Bernard Jourdain	9
(United Kingdom) Team Davey	Porsche 962C	Porsche Type-935/82 3.0 L Turbo Flat-6	D	20	(Mexico) Michel Jourdain	9
(United Kingdom) Spice Engineering	Spice SE90C	Ford Cosworth DFR 3.5 L V8	G	21	(Mexico) Bernard Jourdain	1–2
(United Kingdom) Spice Engineering	Spice SE90C	Ford Cosworth DFR 3.5 L V8	G	21	(Chile) Eliseo Salazar	1, 9
(United Kingdom) Spice Engineering	Spice SE90C	Ford Cosworth DFR 3.5 L V8	G	21	(Spain) Fermín Vélez	2–5, 8–9
(United Kingdom) Spice Engineering	Spice SE90C	Ford Cosworth DFR 3.5 L V8	G	21	(Italy) Bruno Giacomelli	3, 7
(United Kingdom) Spice Engineering	Spice SE90C	Ford Cosworth DFR 3.5 L V8	G	21	(United Kingdom) Tim Harvey	4
(United Kingdom) Spice Engineering	Spice SE90C	Ford Cosworth DFR 3.5 L V8	G	21	(Netherlands) Cor Euser	5–6
(United Kingdom) Spice Engineering	Spice SE90C	Ford Cosworth DFR 3.5 L V8	G	21	(Greece) Costas Los	6
(United Kingdom) Spice Engineering	Spice SE90C	Ford Cosworth DFR 3.5 L V8	G	21	(Belgium) Eric van de Poele	7
(United Kingdom) Spice Engineering	Spice SE90C	Ford Cosworth DFR 3.5 L V8	G	21	(South Africa) Wayne Taylor	8
(United Kingdom) Spice Engineering	Spice SE90C	Ford Cosworth DFR 3.5 L V8	G	22	(United Kingdom) Tim Harvey	1, 3–4, 7
(United Kingdom) Spice Engineering	Spice SE90C	Ford Cosworth DFR 3.5 L V8	G	22	(Italy) Bruno Giacomelli	1
(United Kingdom) Spice Engineering	Spice SE90C	Ford Cosworth DFR 3.5 L V8	G	22	(South Africa) Wayne Taylor	2–3, 5, 8
(United Kingdom) Spice Engineering	Spice SE90C	Ford Cosworth DFR 3.5 L V8	G	22	(Belgium) Eric van de Poele	2
(United Kingdom) Spice Engineering	Spice SE90C	Ford Cosworth DFR 3.5 L V8	G	22	(Spain) Fermín Vélez	4, 8
(United Kingdom) Spice Engineering	Spice SE90C	Ford Cosworth DFR 3.5 L V8	G	22	(Chile) Eliseo Salazar	5
(United Kingdom) Spice Engineering	Spice SE90C	Ford Cosworth DFR 3.5 L V8	G	22	(Netherlands) Cor Euser	6–7
(United Kingdom) Spice Engineering	Spice SE90C	Ford Cosworth DFR 3.5 L V8	G	22	(Greece) Costas Los	6
(Japan) Nissan Motorsports International	Nissan R89C; Nissan R90CP; Nissan R90CK	Nissan VRH35Z 3.5 L Turbo V8	D	23	(Japan) Kazuyoshi Hoshino	1
(Japan) Nissan Motorsports International	Nissan R89C; Nissan R90CP; Nissan R90CK	Nissan VRH35Z 3.5 L Turbo V8	D	23	(United Kingdom) Andrew Gilbert-Scott	1
(Japan) Nissan Motorsports International	Nissan R89C; Nissan R90CP; Nissan R90CK	Nissan VRH35Z 3.5 L Turbo V8	D	23	(United Kingdom) Julian Bailey	2–9
(Japan) Nissan Motorsports International	Nissan R89C; Nissan R90CP; Nissan R90CK	Nissan VRH35Z 3.5 L Turbo V8	D	23	(United Kingdom) Kenny Acheson	2–4
(Japan) Nissan Motorsports International	Nissan R89C; Nissan R90CP; Nissan R90CK	Nissan VRH35Z 3.5 L Turbo V8	D	23	(United Kingdom) Mark Blundell	5–9
(Japan) Nissan Motorsports International	Nissan R89C; Nissan R90CP; Nissan R90CK	Nissan VRH35Z 3.5 L Turbo V8	D	24	(Japan) Masahiro Hasemi	1
(Japan) Nissan Motorsports International	Nissan R89C; Nissan R90CP; Nissan R90CK	Nissan VRH35Z 3.5 L Turbo V8	D	24	(Sweden) Anders Olofsson	1
(Japan) Nissan Motorsports International	Nissan R89C; Nissan R90CP; Nissan R90CK	Nissan VRH35Z 3.5 L Turbo V8	D	24	(Italy) Gianfranco Brancatelli	2–5, 8-9
(Japan) Nissan Motorsports International	Nissan R89C; Nissan R90CP; Nissan R90CK	Nissan VRH35Z 3.5 L Turbo V8	D	24	(United Kingdom) Mark Blundell	2–4
(Japan) Nissan Motorsports International	Nissan R89C; Nissan R90CP; Nissan R90CK	Nissan VRH35Z 3.5 L Turbo V8	D	24	(United Kingdom) Kenny Acheson	5–9
(Japan) Nissan Motorsports International	Nissan R89C; Nissan R90CP; Nissan R90CK	Nissan VRH35Z 3.5 L Turbo V8	Y	25	(Japan) Takao Wada	1
(Japan) Nissan Motorsports International	Nissan R89C; Nissan R90CP; Nissan R90CK	Nissan VRH35Z 3.5 L Turbo V8	Y	25	(United Kingdom) Kenny Acheson	1
(West Germany) Obermaier Racing	Porsche 962C	Porsche Type-935/82 3.0 L Turbo Flat-6	G	26	(West Germany) Harald Grohs	All
(West Germany) Obermaier Racing	Porsche 962C	Porsche Type-935/82 3.0 L Turbo Flat-6	G	26	(West Germany) Jürgen Oppermann	1–4, 6
(West Germany) Obermaier Racing	Porsche 962C	Porsche Type-935/82 3.0 L Turbo Flat-6	G	26	(France) Pierre Yver	5
(West Germany) Obermaier Racing	Porsche 962C	Porsche Type-935/82 3.0 L Turbo Flat-6	G	26	(West Germany) Otto Altenbach	7–9
(West Germany) Obermaier Racing	Porsche 962C	Porsche Type-935/82 3.0 L Turbo Flat-6	G	27	(West Germany) Otto Altenbach	All
(West Germany) Obermaier Racing	Porsche 962C	Porsche Type-935/82 3.0 L Turbo Flat-6	G	27	(West Germany) Jürgen Lässig	1–4, 6, 8
(West Germany) Obermaier Racing	Porsche 962C	Porsche Type-935/82 3.0 L Turbo Flat-6	G	27	(West Germany) Harald Grohs	5, 7, 9
(United Kingdom) Chamberlain Engineering	Spice SE89C; British Barn BB90R	Ford Cosworth DFZ 3.5 L V8; Ford Cosworth DFR 3.5 L V8	G	28	(Netherlands) Cor Euser	1–4
(United Kingdom) Chamberlain Engineering	Spice SE89C; British Barn BB90R	Ford Cosworth DFZ 3.5 L V8; Ford Cosworth DFR 3.5 L V8	G	28	(Spain) Fermín Vélez	1
(United Kingdom) Chamberlain Engineering	Spice SE89C; British Barn BB90R	Ford Cosworth DFZ 3.5 L V8; Ford Cosworth DFR 3.5 L V8	G	28	(Switzerland) Mario Hytten	2–4
(United Kingdom) Chamberlain Engineering	Spice SE89C; British Barn BB90R	Ford Cosworth DFZ 3.5 L V8; Ford Cosworth DFR 3.5 L V8	G	28	(United Kingdom) Nick Adams	5–8
(United Kingdom) Chamberlain Engineering	Spice SE89C; British Barn BB90R	Ford Cosworth DFZ 3.5 L V8; Ford Cosworth DFR 3.5 L V8	G	28	(Netherlands) Charles Zwolsman	5–6, 8
(United Kingdom) Chamberlain Engineering	Spice SE89C; British Barn BB90R	Ford Cosworth DFZ 3.5 L V8; Ford Cosworth DFR 3.5 L V8	G	28	(United Kingdom) Richard Piper	6
(United Kingdom) Chamberlain Engineering	Spice SE89C; British Barn BB90R	Ford Cosworth DFZ 3.5 L V8; Ford Cosworth DFR 3.5 L V8	G	28	(United Kingdom) Will Hoy	7
(United Kingdom) Chamberlain Engineering	Spice SE89C; British Barn BB90R	Ford Cosworth DFZ 3.5 L V8; Ford Cosworth DFR 3.5 L V8	G	28	(Mexico) Alfonso Toledano	9
(United Kingdom) Chamberlain Engineering	Spice SE89C; British Barn BB90R	Ford Cosworth DFZ 3.5 L V8; Ford Cosworth DFR 3.5 L V8	G	28	(Switzerland) Bernard Thuner	9
(United Kingdom) Chamberlain Engineering	Spice SE89C; British Barn BB90R	Ford Cosworth DFZ 3.5 L V8; Ford Cosworth DFR 3.5 L V8	D G	29	(Japan) Tunehisa Asai	1
(United Kingdom) Chamberlain Engineering	Spice SE89C; British Barn BB90R	Ford Cosworth DFZ 3.5 L V8; Ford Cosworth DFR 3.5 L V8	D G	29	(Japan) Jirou Yoneyama	1
(United Kingdom) Chamberlain Engineering	Spice SE89C; British Barn BB90R	Ford Cosworth DFZ 3.5 L V8; Ford Cosworth DFR 3.5 L V8	D G	29	(United Kingdom) Nick Adams	2–4
(United Kingdom) Chamberlain Engineering	Spice SE89C; British Barn BB90R	Ford Cosworth DFZ 3.5 L V8; Ford Cosworth DFR 3.5 L V8	D G	29	(Netherlands) Charles Zwolsman	2, 4, 8–9
(United Kingdom) Chamberlain Engineering	Spice SE89C; British Barn BB90R	Ford Cosworth DFZ 3.5 L V8; Ford Cosworth DFR 3.5 L V8	D G	29	(United Kingdom) Richard Piper	3, 8–9
(United Kingdom) Chamberlain Engineering	Spice SE89C; British Barn BB90R	Ford Cosworth DFZ 3.5 L V8; Ford Cosworth DFR 3.5 L V8	D G	29	(France) Philippe de Henning	5
(United Kingdom) Chamberlain Engineering	Spice SE89C; British Barn BB90R	Ford Cosworth DFZ 3.5 L V8; Ford Cosworth DFR 3.5 L V8	D G	29	(United Kingdom) John Williams	5
(United Kingdom) Chamberlain Engineering	Spice SE89C; British Barn BB90R	Ford Cosworth DFZ 3.5 L V8; Ford Cosworth DFR 3.5 L V8	D G	29	(Switzerland) Bernard Thuner	7
(United Kingdom) Chamberlain Engineering	Spice SE89C; British Barn BB90R	Ford Cosworth DFZ 3.5 L V8; Ford Cosworth DFR 3.5 L V8	D G	29	(Canada) Robbie Stirling	7
(United Kingdom) GP Motorsport	Spice SE90C; Spice SE87C; Spice SE89C	Ford Cosworth DFZ 3.5 L V8; Ford Cosworth DFR 3.5 L V8	D	30	(France) Philippe de Henning	1–4
(United Kingdom) GP Motorsport	Spice SE90C; Spice SE87C; Spice SE89C	Ford Cosworth DFZ 3.5 L V8; Ford Cosworth DFR 3.5 L V8	D	30	(United Kingdom) David Hobbs	1
(United Kingdom) GP Motorsport	Spice SE90C; Spice SE87C; Spice SE89C	Ford Cosworth DFZ 3.5 L V8; Ford Cosworth DFR 3.5 L V8	D	30	(United Kingdom) Will Hoy	2
(United Kingdom) GP Motorsport	Spice SE90C; Spice SE87C; Spice SE89C	Ford Cosworth DFZ 3.5 L V8; Ford Cosworth DFR 3.5 L V8	D	30	(Finland) Jari Nurminen	3–5, 7
(United Kingdom) GP Motorsport	Spice SE90C; Spice SE87C; Spice SE89C	Ford Cosworth DFZ 3.5 L V8; Ford Cosworth DFR 3.5 L V8	D	30	(Belgium) Quirin Bovy	4
(United Kingdom) GP Motorsport	Spice SE90C; Spice SE87C; Spice SE89C	Ford Cosworth DFZ 3.5 L V8; Ford Cosworth DFR 3.5 L V8	D	30	(Italy) Beppe Gabbiani	5–8
(United Kingdom) GP Motorsport	Spice SE90C; Spice SE87C; Spice SE89C	Ford Cosworth DFZ 3.5 L V8; Ford Cosworth DFR 3.5 L V8	D	30	(United Kingdom) Richard Jones	6
(United Kingdom) GP Motorsport	Spice SE90C; Spice SE87C; Spice SE89C	Ford Cosworth DFZ 3.5 L V8; Ford Cosworth DFR 3.5 L V8	D	30	(United Kingdom) Andrew Hepworth	8
(United Kingdom) GP Motorsport	Spice SE90C; Spice SE87C; Spice SE89C	Ford Cosworth DFZ 3.5 L V8; Ford Cosworth DFR 3.5 L V8	D	30	(United States) Tom Hessert	9
(United Kingdom) GP Motorsport	Spice SE90C; Spice SE87C; Spice SE89C	Ford Cosworth DFZ 3.5 L V8; Ford Cosworth DFR 3.5 L V8	D	30	(Mexico) Enrique Contreras	9
(United Kingdom) GP Motorsport	Spice SE90C; Spice SE87C; Spice SE89C	Ford Cosworth DFZ 3.5 L V8; Ford Cosworth DFR 3.5 L V8	D	31	(United Kingdom) Dudley Wood	3
(United Kingdom) GP Motorsport	Spice SE90C; Spice SE87C; Spice SE89C	Ford Cosworth DFZ 3.5 L V8; Ford Cosworth DFR 3.5 L V8	D	31	(Italy) Pasquale Barberio	3
(United Kingdom) GP Motorsport	Spice SE90C; Spice SE87C; Spice SE89C	Ford Cosworth DFZ 3.5 L V8; Ford Cosworth DFR 3.5 L V8	D	31	(United Kingdom) Richard Piper	7
(United Kingdom) GP Motorsport	Spice SE90C; Spice SE87C; Spice SE89C	Ford Cosworth DFZ 3.5 L V8; Ford Cosworth DFR 3.5 L V8	D	31	(United Kingdom) David Youles	7
(Austria) Konrad Motorsport	Porsche 962C	Porsche Type-935/82 3.0 L Turbo Flat-6	G	32	(Austria) Franz Konrad	All
(Austria) Konrad Motorsport	Porsche 962C	Porsche Type-935/82 3.0 L Turbo Flat-6	G	32	(France) Jean-Louis Ricci	1
(Austria) Konrad Motorsport	Porsche 962C	Porsche Type-935/82 3.0 L Turbo Flat-6	G	32	(Italy) Almo Coppelli	2
(Austria) Konrad Motorsport	Porsche 962C	Porsche Type-935/82 3.0 L Turbo Flat-6	G	32	(Finland) Harri Toivonen	3–9
(Austria) Konrad Motorsport	Porsche 962C	Porsche Type-935/82 3.0 L Turbo Flat-6	BF	33	(Brazil) Raul Boesel	2, 6
(Austria) Konrad Motorsport	Porsche 962C	Porsche Type-935/82 3.0 L Turbo Flat-6	BF	33	(United Kingdom) Derek Bell	3
(Austria) Konrad Motorsport	Porsche 962C	Porsche Type-935/82 3.0 L Turbo Flat-6	BF	33	(France) Henri Pescarolo	3
(Austria) Konrad Motorsport	Porsche 962C	Porsche Type-935/82 3.0 L Turbo Flat-6	BF	33	(West Germany) Jochen Dauer	5
(Austria) Konrad Motorsport	Porsche 962C	Porsche Type-935/82 3.0 L Turbo Flat-6	BF	33	(United States) Bobby Unser	5
(France) Equipe Alméras Frères	Porsche 962C	Porsche Type-935/82 3.0 L Turbo Flat-6	Y G	34	(United Kingdom) Tiff Needell	1
(France) Equipe Alméras Frères	Porsche 962C	Porsche Type-935/82 3.0 L Turbo Flat-6	Y G	34	(United Kingdom) Derek Bell	1
(France) Equipe Alméras Frères	Porsche 962C	Porsche Type-935/82 3.0 L Turbo Flat-6	Y G	34	(France) Jacques Alméras	2–6, 8–9
(France) Equipe Alméras Frères	Porsche 962C	Porsche Type-935/82 3.0 L Turbo Flat-6	Y G	34	(France) Jean-Marie Alméras	2, 4–6, 8–9
(France) Louis Descartes	ALD C289	Ford Cosworth DFL 3.3 L V8	D	35	(France) François Migault	1–8
(France) Louis Descartes	ALD C289	Ford Cosworth DFL 3.3 L V8	D	35	(France) Louis Descartes	1
(France) Louis Descartes	ALD C289	Ford Cosworth DFL 3.3 L V8	D	35	(France) Denis Morin	2–4
(France) Louis Descartes	ALD C289	Ford Cosworth DFL 3.3 L V8	D	35	(France) Gérard Tremblay	5
(France) Louis Descartes	ALD C289	Ford Cosworth DFL 3.3 L V8	D	35	(France) François Wettling	6–7
(France) Louis Descartes	ALD C289	Ford Cosworth DFL 3.3 L V8	D	35	(Italy) Luigi Taverna	8
(Japan) Toyota Team Tom's	Toyota 89C-V; Toyota 90C-V	Toyota R36V 3.6 L Turbo V8	B	36	(United Kingdom) Geoff Lees	1–3
(Japan) Toyota Team Tom's	Toyota 89C-V; Toyota 90C-V	Toyota R36V 3.6 L Turbo V8	B	36	(Japan) Hitoshi Ogawa	1
(Japan) Toyota Team Tom's	Toyota 89C-V; Toyota 90C-V	Toyota R36V 3.6 L Turbo V8	B	36	(Japan) Aguri Suzuki	2
(Japan) Toyota Team Tom's	Toyota 89C-V; Toyota 90C-V	Toyota R36V 3.6 L Turbo V8	B	36	(United Kingdom) John Watson	3–4
(Japan) Toyota Team Tom's	Toyota 89C-V; Toyota 90C-V	Toyota R36V 3.6 L Turbo V8	B	36	(United Kingdom) Johnny Dumfries	4–9
(Japan) Toyota Team Tom's	Toyota 89C-V; Toyota 90C-V	Toyota R36V 3.6 L Turbo V8	B	36	(Italy) Roberto Ravaglia	5–9
(Japan) Toyota Team Tom's	Toyota 89C-V; Toyota 90C-V	Toyota R36V 3.6 L Turbo V8	B	37	(United Kingdom) Johnny Dumfries	1–3
(Japan) Toyota Team Tom's	Toyota 89C-V; Toyota 90C-V	Toyota R36V 3.6 L Turbo V8	B	37	(Japan) Aguri Suzuki	1, 4
(Japan) Toyota Team Tom's	Toyota 89C-V; Toyota 90C-V	Toyota R36V 3.6 L Turbo V8	B	37	(Italy) Roberto Ravaglia	2
(Japan) Toyota Team Tom's	Toyota 89C-V; Toyota 90C-V	Toyota R36V 3.6 L Turbo V8	B	37	(Japan) Hitoshi Ogawa	3, 6
(Japan) Toyota Team Tom's	Toyota 89C-V; Toyota 90C-V	Toyota R36V 3.6 L Turbo V8	B	37	(United Kingdom) Geoff Lees	4–9
(Japan) Toyota Team Tom's	Toyota 89C-V; Toyota 90C-V	Toyota R36V 3.6 L Turbo V8	B	37	(United Kingdom) John Watson	5, 7–9
(Japan) Toyota Team Tom's	Toyota 89C-V; Toyota 90C-V	Toyota R36V 3.6 L Turbo V8	D	38	(Austria) Roland Ratzenberger	1
(Japan) Toyota Team Tom's	Toyota 89C-V; Toyota 90C-V	Toyota R36V 3.6 L Turbo V8	D	38	(France) Pierre-Henri Raphanel	1
(Switzerland) Swiss Team Salamin	Porsche 962C	Porsche Type-935/82 3.0 L Turbo Flat-6	B G	39	(West Germany) Volker Weidler	1
(Switzerland) Swiss Team Salamin	Porsche 962C	Porsche Type-935/82 3.0 L Turbo Flat-6	B G	39	(Japan) Akihiko Nakaya	1
(Switzerland) Swiss Team Salamin	Porsche 962C	Porsche Type-935/82 3.0 L Turbo Flat-6	B G	39	(Switzerland) Antoine Salamin	2–9
(Switzerland) Swiss Team Salamin	Porsche 962C	Porsche Type-935/82 3.0 L Turbo Flat-6	B G	39	(Italy) Luigi Taverna	2–5
(Switzerland) Swiss Team Salamin	Porsche 962C	Porsche Type-935/82 3.0 L Turbo Flat-6	B G	39	(Morocco) Max Cohen-Olivar	6–9
(United Kingdom) The Berkeley Team London	Spice SE89C	Ford Cosworth DFZ 3.5 L V8	G	40	(Italy) Ranieri Randaccio	1–8
(United Kingdom) The Berkeley Team London	Spice SE89C	Ford Cosworth DFZ 3.5 L V8	G	40	(Italy) Stefano Sebastiani	1, 3–5, 7, 9
(United Kingdom) The Berkeley Team London	Spice SE89C	Ford Cosworth DFZ 3.5 L V8	G	40	(Italy) Pasquale Barberio	2, 6, 8–9
(Italy) Alba Formula Team	Alba AR20	Subaru 1235 3.5 L Flat-12; Buick 4.5 L V6	G	41	(Italy) Marco Brand	1–4, 6–7
(Italy) Alba Formula Team	Alba AR20	Subaru 1235 3.5 L Flat-12; Buick 4.5 L V6	G	41	(Italy) Gianfranco Brancatelli	1, 6-7
(Italy) Alba Formula Team	Alba AR20	Subaru 1235 3.5 L Flat-12; Buick 4.5 L V6	G	41	(Italy) Fabio Mancini	2, 4
(Italy) Alba Formula Team	Alba AR20	Subaru 1235 3.5 L Flat-12; Buick 4.5 L V6	G	41	(Italy) Giorgio Francia	8–9
(Italy) Alba Formula Team	Alba AR20	Subaru 1235 3.5 L Flat-12; Buick 4.5 L V6	G	41	(France) François Migault	9
(France) Peugeot Talbot Sport	Peugeot 905	Peugeot SA35-A1 3.5 L V10	M	44	(Finland) Keke Rosberg	8–9
(France) Peugeot Talbot Sport	Peugeot 905	Peugeot SA35-A1 3.5 L V10	M	44	(France) Jean-Pierre Jabouille	8–9

== Results and standings ==
=== Race results ===
The Montreal race was stopped before 75% distance was completed, therefore half points were awarded.

Rnd	Circuit	Winning team	Results
Rnd	Circuit	Winning drivers	Results
1	Suzuka	(West Germany) No. 1 Team Sauber-Mercedes	Report
1	Suzuka	(France) Jean-Louis Schlesser (Italy) Mauro Baldi	Report
2	Monza	(West Germany) No. 1 Team Sauber-Mercedes	Report
2	Monza	(France) Jean-Louis Schlesser (Italy) Mauro Baldi	Report
3	Silverstone	(United Kingdom) No. 3 Silk Cut Jaguar	Report
3	Silverstone	(United Kingdom) Martin Brundle (France) Alain Ferté	Report
4	Spa-Francorchamps	(West Germany) No. 2 Team Sauber-Mercedes	Report
4	Spa-Francorchamps	(West Germany) Jochen Mass (Austria) Karl Wendlinger	Report
5	Dijon-Prenois	(West Germany) No. 1 Team Sauber-Mercedes	Report
5	Dijon-Prenois	(France) Jean-Louis Schlesser (Italy) Mauro Baldi	Report
6	Nürburgring	(West Germany) No. 1 Team Sauber-Mercedes	Report
6	Nürburgring	(France) Jean-Louis Schlesser (Italy) Mauro Baldi	Report
7	Donington	(West Germany) No. 1 Team Sauber-Mercedes	Report
7	Donington	(France) Jean-Louis Schlesser (Italy) Mauro Baldi	Report
8	Montreal	(West Germany) No. 1 Team Sauber-Mercedes	Report
8	Montreal	(France) Jean-Louis Schlesser (Italy) Mauro Baldi	Report
9	Mexico City	(West Germany) No. 2 Team Sauber-Mercedes	Report
9	Mexico City	(West Germany) Jochen Mass (West Germany) Michael Schumacher	Report

Points system
1st	2nd	3rd	4th	5th	6th
9	6	4	3	2	1

In order to be classified for points, a team had to complete 75% of the winner's distance. Further, drivers were required to complete at least 30% of their car's total race distance to qualify for championship points.

=== Drivers' World Championship ===
Pos	Driver	Team	(Japan) SUZ	(Italy) MNZ	(United Kingdom) SIL	(Belgium) SPA	(France) DIJ	(West Germany) NUR	(United Kingdom) DON	(Canada) MON	(Mexico) MEX	Points
1	(France) Jean-Louis Schlesser	(West Germany) Team Sauber-Mercedes	1	1	Ret	8	1	1	1	1	DSQ	49.5
1	(Italy) Mauro Baldi	(West Germany) Team Sauber-Mercedes	1	1	Ret	8	1	1	1	1	DSQ	49.5
2	(West Germany) Jochen Mass	(West Germany) Team Sauber-Mercedes	2	2	DNQ	1	2	2	2	9	1	48
3	(United Kingdom) Andy Wallace	(United Kingdom) Silk Cut Jaguar	Ret	4	2	2	4	4	DSQ	Ret	3	25
4	(Austria) Karl Wendlinger	(West Germany) Team Sauber-Mercedes	2	2		1				9		21
4	(West Germany) Michael Schumacher	(West Germany) Team Sauber-Mercedes			DNQ		2	2			1	21
5	(Netherlands) Jan Lammers	(United Kingdom) Silk Cut Jaguar	Ret	4	2	2	4	4	DSQ	15	Ret	21
6	(United Kingdom) Martin Brundle	(United Kingdom) Silk Cut Jaguar	Ret	3	1	Ret	5	3	DSQ	15	Ret	19
7	(United Kingdom) Julian Bailey	(Japan) Nissan Motorsports International		7	Ret	3	3	DNS	6	2	2	18
8	(United Kingdom) Mark Blundell	(Japan) Nissan Motorsports International		Ret	NC	10	3	5	6	2	2	16
9	(United Kingdom) Kenny Acheson	(Japan) Nissan Motorsports International	Ret	7	Ret	3	21	9	4	5	4	11
10	(France) Alain Ferté	(United Kingdom) Silk Cut Jaguar	Ret	3	1	DNS	5	3	DNS			10
11	(France) Bob Wollek	(West Germany) Joest Porsche Racing	Ret	5	4	7	7	6	7	6	6	7.5
11	(West Germany) Frank Jelinski	(West Germany) Joest Porsche Racing	Ret	5	4	7	7	6	7	6	6	7.5
12	(Spain) Fermín Vélez	(United Kingdom) Chamberlain Engineering	DNQ									7
12	(Spain) Fermín Vélez	(United Kingdom) Spice Engineering		11	3	4	Ret			21	10	7
12	(United Kingdom) Tim Harvey	(United Kingdom) Spice Engineering	Ret		Ret	4			3			7
13	(West Germany) Heinz-Harald Frentzen	(West Germany) Team Sauber-Mercedes							2			6
14	(Italy) Bruno Giacomelli	(United Kingdom) Spice Engineering	Ret		3				5			6
14	(Italy) Bruno Giacomelli	(United Kingdom) Team Davey		DNS								6
15	(Italy) Gianfranco Brancatelli	(Italy) Alba Formula Team	DNQ					9	4			6
15	(Italy) Gianfranco Brancatelli	(Japan) Nissan Motorsports International		Ret	NC	10	21			DNS	4	6
16	(Sweden) Anders Olofsson	(Japan) Nissan Motorsports International	3									4
16	(Sweden) Anders Olofsson	(West Germany) Porsche Kremer Racing		10		12			8			4
16	(Japan) Masahiro Hasemi	(Japan) Nissan Motorsports International	3									4
16	(Netherlands) Cor Euser	(United Kingdom) Chamberlain Engineering	DNQ	Ret	Ret	19						4
16	(Netherlands) Cor Euser	(United Kingdom) Spice Engineering					Ret	7	3			4
16	(United States) Davy Jones	(United Kingdom) Silk Cut Jaguar								Ret	3	4
17	(Argentina) Oscar Larrauri	(Switzerland) Brun Motorsport	6	Ret	6	5	12	8	Ret	10	Ret	4
18	(West Germany) Bernd Schneider	(West Germany) Porsche Kremer Racing	13	9	5	9		18	9	4	7	3.5
19	(West Germany) Manuel Reuter	(United Kingdom) Richard Lloyd Racing	15	17	11	6	Ret	Ret	11	3	Ret	3
20	(United Kingdom) Geoff Lees	(Japan) Toyota Team Tom's	4	Ret	12	DNS	Ret	Ret	Ret	7	Ret	3
20	(Japan) Hitoshi Ogawa	(Japan) Toyota Team Tom's	4		Ret			Ret				3
21	(Belgium) Eric van de Poele	(United Kingdom) Spice Engineering		6					5			3
21	(Sweden) Steven Andskär	(Switzerland) Brun Motorsport	7									3
21	(Sweden) Steven Andskär	(West Germany) Porsche Kremer Racing			5							3
21	(Sweden) Steven Andskär	(United Kingdom) Richard Lloyd Racing				6		Ret	11	DNS		3
22	(United Kingdom) Jonathan Palmer	(West Germany) Joest Porsche Racing	11	8	Ret	Ret	8	Ret	10	8	5	2
22	(Germany) Hans-Joachim Stuck	(West Germany) Joest Porsche Racing						Ret		8	5	2
22	(Japan) Kunimitsu Takahashi	(Germany) Porsche Kremer Racing	5									2
22	(Japan) Kazuo Mogi	(Germany) Porsche Kremer Racing	5									2
23	(South Africa) Wayne Taylor	(United Kingdom) Spice Engineering		6	Ret		6			21		2
24	(Belgium) Harald Huysman	(Switzerland) Brun Motorsport	6	Ret	6	5	12	8	Ret	10	Ret	1
24	(Chile) Eliseo Salazar	(United Kingdom) Spice Engineering	18				6				10	1
Pos	Driver	Team	(Japan) SUZ	(Italy) MNZ	(United Kingdom) SIL	(Belgium) SPA	(France) DIJ	(West Germany) NUR	(United Kingdom) DON	(Canada) MON	(Mexico) MEX	Points

Colour	Result
Gold	Winner
Silver	Second place
Bronze	Third place
Green	Points classification
Blue	Non-points classification
Blue	Non-classified finish (NC)
Purple	Retired, not classified (Ret)
Red	Did not qualify (DNQ)
Red	Did not pre-qualify (DNPQ)
Black	Disqualified (DSQ)
White	Did not start (DNS)
White	Withdrew (WD)
White	Race cancelled (C)
Blank	Did not practice (DNP)
Blank	Did not arrive (DNA)
Blank	Excluded (EX)

=== Teams' World Championship ===
Pos	Team	(Japan) SUZ	(Italy) MNZ	(United Kingdom) SIL	(Belgium) SPA	(France) DIJ	(West Germany) NUR	(United Kingdom) DON	(Canada) MON	(Mexico) MEX	Points
1	(West Germany) Team Sauber-Mercedes	1	1	Ret	1	1	1	1	1	1	67.5
2	(United Kingdom) Silk Cut Jaguar	Ret	3	1	2	4	3	DSQ	15	3	30
3	(Japan) Nissan Motorsports International	3	7	NC	3	3	5	4	2	2	26
4	(United Kingdom) Spice Engineering	18	6	3	4	6	7	3	21	10	13
5	(West Germany) Joest Porsche Racing	11	5	4	7	7	6	7	6	5	8.5
6	(West Germany) Porsche Kremer Racing	5	9	5	9	18	18	8	4	7	5.5
7	(Switzerland) Brun Motorsport	6	12	6	5	11	8	12	10	Ret	4
8	(United Kingdom) Richard Lloyd Racing	15	17	11	6	Ret	Ret	11	3	Ret	3
9	(Japan) Toyota Team Tom's	4	Ret	12	18	Ret	Ret	Ret	7	Ret	3

== See also ==
1990 24 Hours of Le Mans, a race for Group C Sports Prototypes which did not count towards the 1990 World Sports-Prototype Championship.
