= 1990 480 km of Dijon =

Layout of the Dijon circuit

The 1990 480 km of Dijon was the fifth round of the 1990 World Sportscar Championship season, taking place at Circuit de Dijon-Prenois, France. It took place on July 22, 1990.

Following a heavy accident involving the #14 Richard Lloyd Racing and #26 Obermaier Racing entries on the first lap, the race was red-flagged. A restart was performed several minutes later, with the race running its original distance.

== Official results ==
Class winners in bold. Cars failing to complete 75% of the winner's distance marked as Not Classified (NC).

| Pos | Class | No | Team | Drivers | Chassis | Tyre | Laps |
| Pos | Class | No | Team | Drivers | Engine | Tyre | Laps |
|---|---|---|---|---|---|---|---|
| 1 | **C** | **1** | **(Germany) Team Sauber Mercedes** | **(France) Jean-Louis Schlesser (Italy) Mauro Baldi** | **Mercedes-Benz C11** | G | **127** |
| 1 | **C** | **1** | **(Germany) Team Sauber Mercedes** | **(France) Jean-Louis Schlesser (Italy) Mauro Baldi** | **Mercedes-Benz M119 5.0L Turbo V8** | G | **127** |
| 2 | C | 2 | (Germany) Team Sauber Mercedes | (Germany) Jochen Mass (Germany) Michael Schumacher | Mercedes-Benz C11 | G | 127 |
| 2 | C | 2 | (Germany) Team Sauber Mercedes | (Germany) Jochen Mass (Germany) Michael Schumacher | Mercedes-Benz M119 5.0L Turbo V8 | G | 127 |
| 3 | C | 23 | (Japan) Nissan Motorsports International | (United Kingdom) Julian Bailey (United Kingdom) Mark Blundell | Nissan R90CK | D | 126 |
| 3 | C | 23 | (Japan) Nissan Motorsports International | (United Kingdom) Julian Bailey (United Kingdom) Mark Blundell | Nissan VHR35Z 3.5L Turbo V8 | D | 126 |
| 4 | C | 4 | (United Kingdom) Silk Cut Jaguar | (United Kingdom) Andy Wallace (Netherlands) Jan Lammers | Jaguar XJR-11 | G | 125 |
| 4 | C | 4 | (United Kingdom) Silk Cut Jaguar | (United Kingdom) Andy Wallace (Netherlands) Jan Lammers | Jaguar JV6 3.5L Turbo V6 | G | 125 |
| 5 | C | 3 | (United Kingdom) Silk Cut Jaguar | (United Kingdom) Martin Brundle (France) Alain Ferté | Jaguar XJR-11 | G | 125 |
| 5 | C | 3 | (United Kingdom) Silk Cut Jaguar | (United Kingdom) Martin Brundle (France) Alain Ferté | Jaguar JV6 3.5L Turbo V6 | G | 125 |
| 6 | C | 22 | (United Kingdom) Spice Engineering | (South Africa) Wayne Taylor (Chile) Eliseo Salazar | Spice SE90C | G | 124 |
| 6 | C | 22 | (United Kingdom) Spice Engineering | (South Africa) Wayne Taylor (Chile) Eliseo Salazar | Ford Cosworth DFR 3.5L V8 | G | 124 |
| 7 | C | 7 | (Germany) Joest Porsche Racing | (France) Bob Wollek (Germany) Frank Jelinski | Porsche 962C | MI | 124 |
| 7 | C | 7 | (Germany) Joest Porsche Racing | (France) Bob Wollek (Germany) Frank Jelinski | Porsche Type-935 3.2L Turbo Flat-6 | MI | 124 |
| 8 | C | 8 | (Germany) Joest Porsche Racing | (United Kingdom) Jonathan Palmer (United Kingdom) David Hobbs | Porsche 962C | MI | 122 |
| 8 | C | 8 | (Germany) Joest Porsche Racing | (United Kingdom) Jonathan Palmer (United Kingdom) David Hobbs | Porsche Type-935 3.2L Turbo Flat-6 | MI | 122 |
| 9 | C | 6 | (Germany) Joest Racing | (France) Henri Pescarolo (France) Jean-Louis Ricci | Porsche 962C | G | 121 |
| 9 | C | 6 | (Germany) Joest Racing | (France) Henri Pescarolo (France) Jean-Louis Ricci | Porsche Type-935 3.0L Turbo Flat-6 | G | 121 |
| 10 | C | 13 | (France) Courage Compétition | (France) Pascal Fabre (France) Lionel Robert | Cougar C24S | G | 121 |
| 10 | C | 13 | (France) Courage Compétition | (France) Pascal Fabre (France) Lionel Robert | Porsche Type-935 3.0L Turbo Flat-6 | G | 121 |
| 11 | C | 16 | (Switzerland) Brun Motorsport | (Spain) Jesús Pareja (Switzerland) Walter Brun | Porsche 962C | Y | 121 |
| 11 | C | 16 | (Switzerland) Brun Motorsport | (Spain) Jesús Pareja (Switzerland) Walter Brun | Porsche Type-935 3.0L Turbo Flat-6 | Y | 121 |
| 12 | C | 15 | (Switzerland) Brun Motorsport | (Argentina) Oscar Larrauri (Norway) Harald Huysman | Porsche 962C | Y | 121 |
| 12 | C | 15 | (Switzerland) Brun Motorsport | (Argentina) Oscar Larrauri (Norway) Harald Huysman | Porsche Type-935 3.0L Turbo Flat-6 | Y | 121 |
| 13 | C | 30 | (United Kingdom) GP Motorsport | (Finland) Jari Nurminen (Italy) Beppe Gabbiani | Spice SE90C | D | 120 |
| 13 | C | 30 | (United Kingdom) GP Motorsport | (Finland) Jari Nurminen (Italy) Beppe Gabbiani | Ford Cosworth DFZ 3.5L V8 | D | 120 |
| 14 | C | 28 | (United Kingdom) Chamberlain Engineering | (United Kingdom) Nick Adams (Netherlands) Charles Zwolsman | Spice SE90C | G | 120 |
| 14 | C | 28 | (United Kingdom) Chamberlain Engineering | (United Kingdom) Nick Adams (Netherlands) Charles Zwolsman | Ford Cosworth DFZ 3.5L V8 | G | 120 |
| 15 | C | 33 | (Austria) Konrad Motorsport (Germany) Dauer Racing | (Germany) Jochen Dauer (United States) Bobby Unser | Porsche 962C | BF | 120 |
| 15 | C | 33 | (Austria) Konrad Motorsport (Germany) Dauer Racing | (Germany) Jochen Dauer (United States) Bobby Unser | Porsche Type-935 3.0L Turbo Flat-6 | BF | 120 |
| 16 | C | 16 | (Switzerland) Brun Motorsport | (Switzerland) Bernard Santal (Switzerland) Walter Brun | Porsche 962C | Y | 118 |
| 16 | C | 16 | (Switzerland) Brun Motorsport | (Switzerland) Bernard Santal (Switzerland) Walter Brun | Porsche Type-935 3.0L Turbo Flat-6 | Y | 118 |
| 17 | C | 27 | (Germany) Obermaier Racing | (Germany) Otto Altenbach | Porsche 962C | G | 117 |
| 17 | C | 27 | (Germany) Obermaier Racing | (Germany) Otto Altenbach | Porsche Type-935 3.0L Turbo Flat-6 | G | 117 |
| 18 | C | 19 | (Germany) Porsche Kremer Racing (United Kingdom) Convector | (United Kingdom) Anthony Reid (Germany) Jürgen Barth | Porsche 962C | D | 117 |
| 18 | C | 19 | (Germany) Porsche Kremer Racing (United Kingdom) Convector | (United Kingdom) Anthony Reid (Germany) Jürgen Barth | Porsche 3.0L Turbo Flat-6 | D | 117 |
| 19 | C | 12 | (France) Courage Compétition | (France) Michel Trollé (Switzerland) Bernard Thuner | Cougar C24S | G | 117 |
| 19 | C | 12 | (France) Courage Compétition | (France) Michel Trollé (Switzerland) Bernard Thuner | Porsche Type-935 3.0L Turbo Flat-6 | G | 117 |
| 20 | C | 116 | (Austria) Konrad Motorsport | (Austria) Franz Konrad (Finland) Harri Toivonen | Porsche 962C | G | 116 |
| 20 | C | 116 | (Austria) Konrad Motorsport | (Austria) Franz Konrad (Finland) Harri Toivonen | Porsche Type-935 3.0L Turbo Flat-6 | G | 116 |
| 21 | C | 24 | (Japan) Nissan Motorsports International | (United Kingdom) Kenny Acheson (Italy) Gianfranco Brancatelli | Nissan R90CK | D | 116 |
| 21 | C | 24 | (Japan) Nissan Motorsports International | (United Kingdom) Kenny Acheson (Italy) Gianfranco Brancatelli | Nissan VHR35Z 3.5L Turbo V8 | D | 116 |
| 22 | C | 39 | (Switzerland) Swiss Team Salamin | (Switzerland) Antoine Salamin (Italy) Luigi Taverna | Porsche 962C | G | 115 |
| 22 | C | 39 | (Switzerland) Swiss Team Salamin | (Switzerland) Antoine Salamin (Italy) Luigi Taverna | Porsche Type-935 3.0L Turbo Flat-6 | G | 115 |
| 23 | C | 34 | (France) Equipe Alméras Fréres | (France) Jacques Alméras (France) Jean-Marie Alméras | Porsche 962C | G | 115 |
| 23 | C | 34 | (France) Equipe Alméras Fréres | (France) Jacques Alméras (France) Jean-Marie Alméras | Porsche Type-935 3.0L Turbo Flat-6 | G | 115 |
| 24 | C | 10 | (Germany) Porsche Kremer Racing | (South Africa) Sarel van der Merwe | Porsche 962CK6 | Y | 114 |
| 24 | C | 10 | (Germany) Porsche Kremer Racing | (South Africa) Sarel van der Merwe | Porsche Type-935 3.0L Turbo Flat-6 | Y | 114 |
| 25 | C | 40 | (United Kingdom) The Berkeley Team London | (Italy) Ranieri Randaccio (Italy) "Stingbrace" | Spice SE89C | G | 106 |
| 25 | C | 40 | (United Kingdom) The Berkeley Team London | (Italy) Ranieri Randaccio (Italy) "Stingbrace" | Porsche Type-935 3.0L Turbo Flat-6 | G | 106 |
| 26 NC | C | 35 | (France) Louis Descartes | (France) François Migault | ALD C289 | D | 88 |
| 26 NC | C | 35 | (France) Louis Descartes | (France) François Migault | Ford Cosworth DFL 3.3L V8 | D | 88 |
| 27 DSQ^{†} | C | 29 | (United Kingdom) Chamberlain Engineering | (France) Philippe de Henning (United Kingdom) John Williams | Spice SE89C | G | 89 |
| 27 DSQ^{†} | C | 29 | (United Kingdom) Chamberlain Engineering | (France) Philippe de Henning (United Kingdom) John Williams | Ford Cosworth DFZ 3.5L V8 | G | 89 |
| 28 DNF | C | 21 | (United Kingdom) Spice Engineering | (Spain) Fermín Vélez (Netherlands) Cor Euser | Spice SE90C | G | 117 |
| 28 DNF | C | 21 | (United Kingdom) Spice Engineering | (Spain) Fermín Vélez (Netherlands) Cor Euser | Ford Cosworth DFR 3.5L V8 | G | 117 |
| 29 DNF | C | 20 | (United Kingdom) Team Davey | (United Kingdom) Tim Lee-Davey | Porsche 962C | D | 80 |
| 29 DNF | C | 20 | (United Kingdom) Team Davey | (United Kingdom) Tim Lee-Davey | Porsche Type-935 3.0L Turbo Flat-6 | D | 80 |
| 30 DNF | C | 9 | (Germany) Joest Porsche Racing | (Germany) "John Winter" (Sweden) Stanley Dickens | Porsche 962C | MI | 57 |
| 30 DNF | C | 9 | (Germany) Joest Porsche Racing | (Germany) "John Winter" (Sweden) Stanley Dickens | Porsche Type-935 3.2L Turbo Flat-6 | MI | 57 |
| 31 DNF | C | 37 | (Japan) Toyota Team Tom's | (United Kingdom) Geoff Lees (United Kingdom) John Watson | Toyota 90C-V | B | 9 |
| 31 DNF | C | 37 | (Japan) Toyota Team Tom's | (United Kingdom) Geoff Lees (United Kingdom) John Watson | Toyota R36V 3.6L Turbo V8 | B | 9 |
| 32 DNF | C | 36 | (Japan) Toyota Team Tom's | (United Kingdom) Johnny Dumfries (Italy) Roberto Ravaglia | Toyota 90C-V | B | 7 |
| 32 DNF | C | 36 | (Japan) Toyota Team Tom's | (United Kingdom) Johnny Dumfries (Italy) Roberto Ravaglia | Toyota R36V 3.6L Turbo V8 | B | 7 |
| 33 DNF | C | 14 | (United Kingdom) Richard Lloyd Racing | (Germany) Manuel Reuter (United Kingdom) James Weaver | Porsche 962C GTi | G | 0 |
| 33 DNF | C | 14 | (United Kingdom) Richard Lloyd Racing | (Germany) Manuel Reuter (United Kingdom) James Weaver | Porsche Type-935 3.0L Turbo Flat-6 | G | 0 |
| 34 DNF | C | 26 | (Germany) Obermaier Racing | (Germany) Harold Grohs | Porsche 962C | G | 0 |
| 34 DNF | C | 26 | (Germany) Obermaier Racing | (Germany) Harold Grohs | Porsche Type-935 3.0L Turbo Flat-6 | G | 0 |

† - #29 Chamberlain Engineering was disqualified for taking a short-cut in order to return to the pits.

== Statistics ==
- Pole Position - #1 Jean-Louis Schlesser - 1:05.527
- Fastest Lap - #1 Jean-Louis Schlesser - 1:08.973
- Average Speed - 182.044 km/h

World Sportscar Championship
| Previous race: 1990 480 km of Spa | 1990 season | Next race: 1990 480 km of Nürburgring |
