= 1990 480 km of Spa =

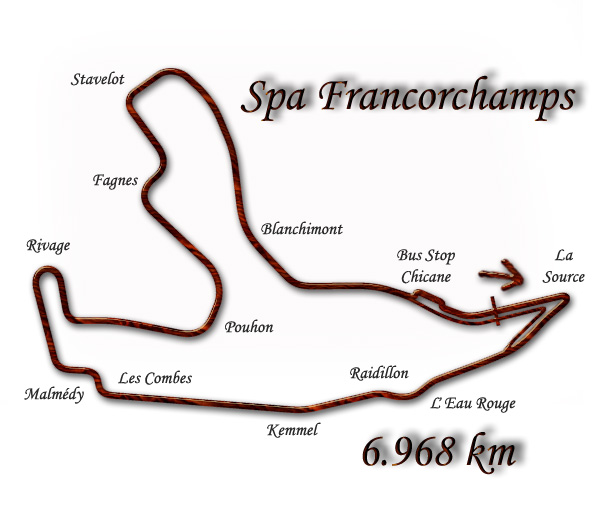
Layout of the Circuit de Spa-Francorchamps (1981–1993, 1995–2003)

The 1990 480 km of Spa was the fourth round of the 1990 World Sportscar Championship season, taking place at Circuit de Spa-Francorchamps, Belgium. It took place on June 3, 1990.

== Official results ==
Class winners in bold. Cars failing to complete 75% of the winner's distance marked as Not Classified (NC).

Pos	Class	No	Team	Drivers	Chassis	Tyre	Laps
Pos	Class	No	Team	Drivers	Engine	Tyre	Laps
1	**C**	**2**	**(Germany) Team Sauber Mercedes**	**(Germany) Jochen Mass (Austria) Karl Wendlinger**	**Mercedes-Benz C11**	G	**70**
1	**C**	**2**	**(Germany) Team Sauber Mercedes**	**(Germany) Jochen Mass (Austria) Karl Wendlinger**	**Mercedes-Benz M119 5.0L Turbo V8**	G	**70**
2	C	4	(United Kingdom) Silk Cut Jaguar	(United Kingdom) Andy Wallace (Netherlands) Jan Lammers	Jaguar XJR-11	G	70
2	C	4	(United Kingdom) Silk Cut Jaguar	(United Kingdom) Andy Wallace (Netherlands) Jan Lammers	Jaguar JV6 3.5L Turbo V6	G	70
3	C	23	(Japan) Nissan Motorsports International	(United Kingdom) Julian Bailey (United Kingdom) Kenny Acheson	Nissan R90CK	D	70
3	C	23	(Japan) Nissan Motorsports International	(United Kingdom) Julian Bailey (United Kingdom) Kenny Acheson	Nissan VHR35Z 3.5L Turbo V8	D	70
4	C	22	(United Kingdom) Spice Engineering	(Spain) Fermín Vélez	Spice SE90C	G	69
4	C	22	(United Kingdom) Spice Engineering	(Spain) Fermín Vélez	Ford Cosworth DFR 3.5L V8	G	69
5	C	15	(Switzerland) Brun Motorsport	(Argentina) Oscar Larrauri (Norway) Harald Huysman	Porsche 962C	Y	69
5	C	15	(Switzerland) Brun Motorsport	(Argentina) Oscar Larrauri (Norway) Harald Huysman	Porsche Type-935 3.0L Turbo Flat-6	Y	69
6	C	14	(United Kingdom) Richard Lloyd Racing	(Germany) Manuel Reuter (Sweden) Steven Andskär	Porsche 962C GTi	G	69
6	C	14	(United Kingdom) Richard Lloyd Racing	(Germany) Manuel Reuter (Sweden) Steven Andskär	Porsche Type-935 3.0L Turbo Flat-6	G	69
7	C	7	(Germany) Joest Porsche Racing	(France) Bob Wollek (Germany) Frank Jelinski	Porsche 962C	MI	69
7	C	7	(Germany) Joest Porsche Racing	(France) Bob Wollek (Germany) Frank Jelinski	Porsche Type-935 3.2L Turbo Flat-6	MI	69
8	C	1	(Germany) Team Sauber Mercedes	(Italy) Mauro Baldi (France) Jean-Louis Schlesser	Mercedes-Benz C11	G	68
8	C	1	(Germany) Team Sauber Mercedes	(Italy) Mauro Baldi (France) Jean-Louis Schlesser	Mercedes-Benz M119 5.0L Turbo V8	G	68
9	C	10	(Germany) Porsche Kremer Racing	(Germany) Bernd Schneider (South Africa) Sarel van der Merwe	Porsche 962CK6	Y	68
9	C	10	(Germany) Porsche Kremer Racing	(Germany) Bernd Schneider (South Africa) Sarel van der Merwe	Porsche Type-935 3.0L Turbo Flat-6	Y	68
10	C	24	(Japan) Nissan Motorsports International	(United Kingdom) Mark Blundell (Italy) Gianfranco Brancatelli	Nissan R90CK	D	67
10	C	24	(Japan) Nissan Motorsports International	(United Kingdom) Mark Blundell (Italy) Gianfranco Brancatelli	Nissan VHR35Z 3.5L Turbo V8	D	67
11	C	27	(Germany) Obermaier Racing	(Germany) Otto Altenbach (Germany) Jürgen Lässig	Porsche 962C	G	67
11	C	27	(Germany) Obermaier Racing	(Germany) Otto Altenbach (Germany) Jürgen Lässig	Porsche 3.0L Turbo Flat-6	G	67
12	C	11	(Germany) Porsche Kremer Racing (United Kingdom) Convector	(United Kingdom) Anthony Reid (Sweden) Anders Olofsson	Porsche 962CK6	D	66
12	C	11	(Germany) Porsche Kremer Racing (United Kingdom) Convector	(United Kingdom) Anthony Reid (Sweden) Anders Olofsson	Porsche Type-935 3.0L Turbo Flat-6	D	66
13	C	32	(Austria) Konrad Motorsport	(Austria) Franz Konrad (Finland) Harri Toivonen	Porsche 962C	G	65
13	C	32	(Austria) Konrad Motorsport	(Austria) Franz Konrad (Finland) Harri Toivonen	Porsche Type-935 3.0L Turbo Flat-6	G	65
14	C	17	(Switzerland) Brun Motorsport	(Italy) Massimo Sigala (Switzerland) Bernard Santal	Porsche 962C	Y	65
14	C	17	(Switzerland) Brun Motorsport	(Italy) Massimo Sigala (Switzerland) Bernard Santal	Porsche Type-935 3.0L Turbo Flat-6	Y	65
15	C	6	(Germany) Joest Racing	(France) Henri Pescarolo (France) Jean-Louis Ricci	Porsche 962C	G	65
15	C	6	(Germany) Joest Racing	(France) Henri Pescarolo (France) Jean-Louis Ricci	Porsche Type-935 3.0L Turbo Flat-6	G	65
16	C	9	(Germany) Joest Porsche Racing	(Sweden) Stanley Dickens (Germany) "John Winter"	Porsche 962C	MI	65
16	C	9	(Germany) Joest Porsche Racing	(Sweden) Stanley Dickens (Germany) "John Winter"	Porsche Type-935 3.2L Turbo Flat-6	MI	65
17	C	19	(United Kingdom) Team Davey	(United Kingdom) Tim Lee-Davey (Italy) Giovanni Lavaggi	Porsche 962C	D	65
17	C	19	(United Kingdom) Team Davey	(United Kingdom) Tim Lee-Davey (Italy) Giovanni Lavaggi	Porsche Type-935 3.0L Turbo Flat-6	D	65
18	C	36	(Japan) Toyota Team Tom's	(United Kingdom) Johnny Dumfries (United Kingdom) John Watson	Toyota 89C-V	B	63
18	C	36	(Japan) Toyota Team Tom's	(United Kingdom) Johnny Dumfries (United Kingdom) John Watson	Toyota R36V 3.6L Turbo V8	B	63
19	C	28	(United Kingdom) Chamberlain Engineering	(Netherlands) Cor Euser (Switzerland) Mario Hytten	Spice SE89C	G	63
19	C	28	(United Kingdom) Chamberlain Engineering	(Netherlands) Cor Euser (Switzerland) Mario Hytten	Ford Cosworth DFZ 3.5L V8	G	63
20	C	12	(France) Courage Compétition	(Greece) Costas Los (Switzerland) Bernard Thuner	Cougar C24S	G	62
20	C	12	(France) Courage Compétition	(Greece) Costas Los (Switzerland) Bernard Thuner	Porsche Type-935 3.0L Turbo Flat-6	G	62
21	C	39	(Switzerland) Swiss Team Salamin	(Switzerland) Antoine Salamin (Italy) Luigi Taverna	Porsche 962C	G	60
21	C	39	(Switzerland) Swiss Team Salamin	(Switzerland) Antoine Salamin (Italy) Luigi Taverna	Porsche Type-935 3.0L Turbo Flat-6	G	60
22	C	34	(France) Equipe Alméras Fréres	(France) Jacques Alméras (France) Jean-Marie Alméras	Porsche 962C	G	58
22	C	34	(France) Equipe Alméras Fréres	(France) Jacques Alméras (France) Jean-Marie Alméras	Porsche Type-935 2.8L Turbo Flat-6	G	58
23	C	40	(United Kingdom) The Berkeley Team London	(Italy) Ranieri Randaccio (Italy) "Stingbrace"	Spice SE89C	G	58
23	C	40	(United Kingdom) The Berkeley Team London	(Italy) Ranieri Randaccio (Italy) "Stingbrace"	Ford Cosworth DFZ 3.5L V8	G	58
24	C	30	(United Kingdom) GP Motorsport	(Finland) Jari Nurminen (Belgium) Quirin Bovy	Spice SE89C	D	56
24	C	30	(United Kingdom) GP Motorsport	(Finland) Jari Nurminen (Belgium) Quirin Bovy	Ford Cosworth DFR 3.5L V8	D	56
25	C	35	(France) Louis Descartes	(France) François Migault (France) Denis Morin	ALD C289	D	56
25	C	35	(France) Louis Descartes	(France) François Migault (France) Denis Morin	Ford Cosworth DFZ 3.5L V8	D	56
26 DNF	C	16	(Switzerland) Brun Motorsport	(Spain) Jesús Pareja (Switzerland) Walter Brun	Porsche 962C	Y	62
26 DNF	C	16	(Switzerland) Brun Motorsport	(Spain) Jesús Pareja (Switzerland) Walter Brun	Porsche Type-935 3.0L Turbo Flat-6	Y	62
27 DNF	C	3	(United Kingdom) Silk Cut Jaguar	(United Kingdom) Martin Brundle	Jaguar XJR-11	G	46
27 DNF	C	3	(United Kingdom) Silk Cut Jaguar	(United Kingdom) Martin Brundle	Jaguar JV6 3.5L Turbo V6	G	46
28 DNF	C	8	(Germany) Joest Porsche Racing	(United Kingdom) Jonathan Palmer (United Kingdom) Derek Bell	Porsche 962C	MI	43
28 DNF	C	8	(Germany) Joest Porsche Racing	(United Kingdom) Jonathan Palmer (United Kingdom) Derek Bell	Porsche Type-935 3.2L Turbo Flat-6	MI	43
29 DNF	C	29	(United Kingdom) Chamberlain Engineering	(United Kingdom) Nick Adams (Netherlands) Charles Zwolsman	Spice SE89C	G	40
29 DNF	C	29	(United Kingdom) Chamberlain Engineering	(United Kingdom) Nick Adams (Netherlands) Charles Zwolsman	Ford Cosworth DFZ 3.5L V8	G	40
30 DNF	C	13	(France) Courage Compétition	(France) Pascal Fabre (France) Michel Trollé	Cougar C24S	G	28
30 DNF	C	13	(France) Courage Compétition	(France) Pascal Fabre (France) Michel Trollé	Porsche Type-935 3.0L Turbo Flat-6	G	28
31 DNF	C	26	(Germany) Obermaier Racing	(Germany) Harald Grohs (Germany) Jürgen Oppermann	Porsche 962C	G	17
31 DNF	C	26	(Germany) Obermaier Racing	(Germany) Harald Grohs (Germany) Jürgen Oppermann	Porsche Type-935 3.0L Turbo Flat-6	G	17
DNS	C	21	(United Kingdom) Spice Engineering	(Spain) Fermín Vélez (United Kingdom) Tim Harvey	Spice SE90C	G	-
DNS	C	21	(United Kingdom) Spice Engineering	(Spain) Fermín Vélez (United Kingdom) Tim Harvey	Ford Cosworth DFR 3.5L V8	G	-
DNS	C	37	(Japan) Toyota Team Tom's	(United Kingdom) Geoff Lees (Japan) Aguri Suzuki	Toyota 90C-V	B	-
DNS	C	37	(Japan) Toyota Team Tom's	(United Kingdom) Geoff Lees (Japan) Aguri Suzuki	Toyota R36V 3.6L Turbo V8	B	-
DNS	C	41	(Italy) Alba Formula Team	(Italy) Marco Brand (Italy) Fabio Mancini	Alba AR20	G	-
DNS	C	41	(Italy) Alba Formula Team	(Italy) Marco Brand (Italy) Fabio Mancini	Subaru (Motori Moderni) 1235 3.5L Flat-12	G	-

== Statistics ==
- Pole Position - #1 Mauro Baldi - 1:59.350
- Fastest Lap - #1 Mauro Baldi - 2:06.211
- Average Speed - 178.916 km/h

World Sportscar Championship
Previous race: 1990 480km of Silverstone	1990 season	Next race: 1990 480km of Dijon
