= 1990 480 km of Nürburgring =

Sports car endurance race in Germany

Nürburgring (1984–1994)

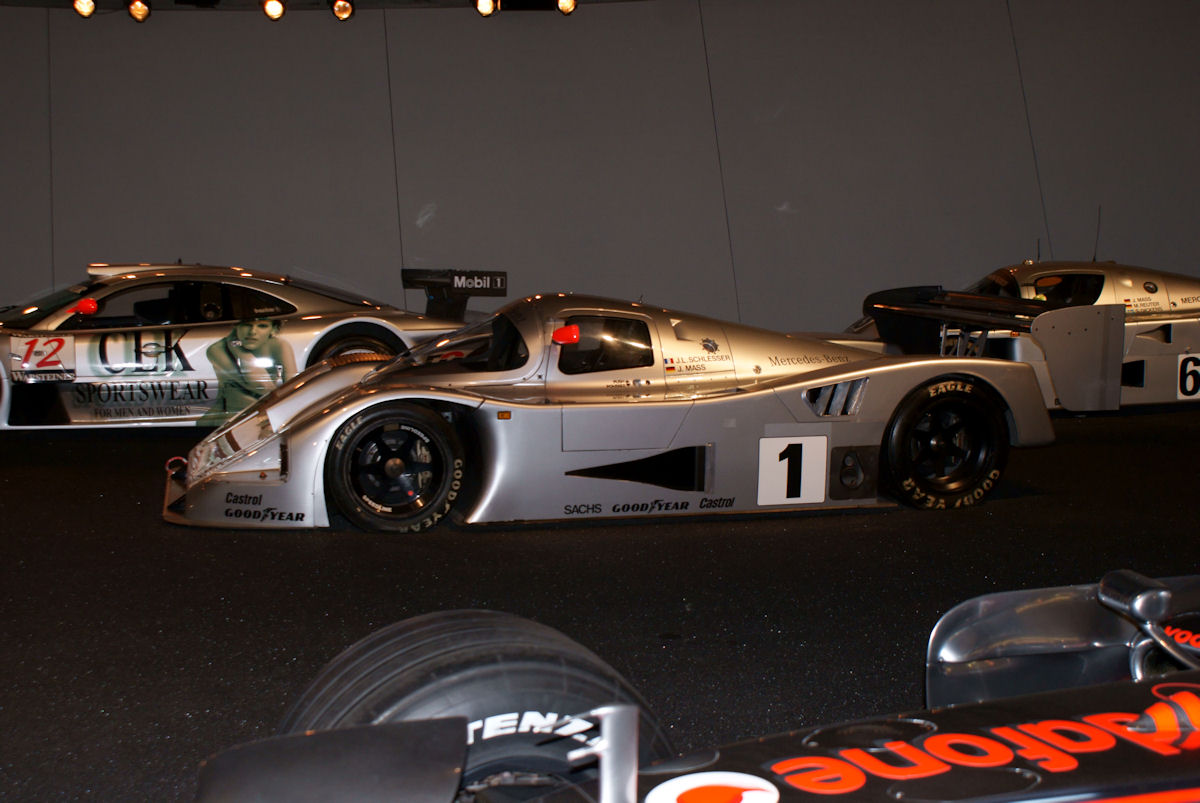

The 1990 480 km of Nürburgring was the sixth round of the 1990 World Sportscar Championship season, taking place at Nürburgring, West Germany. It took place on August 19, 1990.

== Official results ==
Class winners in bold. Cars failing to complete 75% of the winner's distance marked as Not Classified (NC).

Pos	Class	No	Team	Drivers	Chassis	Tyre	Laps
Pos	Class	No	Team	Drivers	Engine	Tyre	Laps
1	**C**	**1**	**(West Germany) Team Sauber Mercedes**	**(France) Jean-Louis Schlesser (Italy) Mauro Baldi**	**Mercedes-Benz C11**	G	**106**
1	**C**	**1**	**(West Germany) Team Sauber Mercedes**	**(France) Jean-Louis Schlesser (Italy) Mauro Baldi**	**Mercedes-Benz M119 5.0L Turbo V8**	G	**106**
2	C	2	(West Germany) Team Sauber Mercedes	(West Germany) Jochen Mass (West Germany) Michael Schumacher	Mercedes-Benz C11	G	106
2	C	2	(West Germany) Team Sauber Mercedes	(West Germany) Jochen Mass (West Germany) Michael Schumacher	Mercedes-Benz M119 5.0L Turbo V8	G	106
3	C	3	(United Kingdom) Silk Cut Jaguar	(United Kingdom) Martin Brundle (France) Alain Ferté	Jaguar XJR-11	G	105
3	C	3	(United Kingdom) Silk Cut Jaguar	(United Kingdom) Martin Brundle (France) Alain Ferté	Jaguar JV6 3.5L Turbo V6	G	105
4	C	4	(United Kingdom) Silk Cut Jaguar	(United Kingdom) Andy Wallace (Netherlands) Jan Lammers	Jaguar XJR-11	G	105
4	C	4	(United Kingdom) Silk Cut Jaguar	(United Kingdom) Andy Wallace (Netherlands) Jan Lammers	Jaguar JV6 3.5L Turbo V6	G	105
5	C	23	(Japan) Nissan Motorsports International	(United Kingdom) Mark Blundell	Nissan R90CK	D	103
5	C	23	(Japan) Nissan Motorsports International	(United Kingdom) Mark Blundell	Nissan VHR35Z 3.5L Turbo V8	D	103
6	C	7	(West Germany) Joest Porsche Racing	(France) Bob Wollek (West Germany) Frank Jelinski	Porsche 962C	MI	103
6	C	7	(West Germany) Joest Porsche Racing	(France) Bob Wollek (West Germany) Frank Jelinski	Porsche Type-935 3.2L Turbo Flat-6	MI	103
7	C	21	(United Kingdom) Spice Engineering	(Greece) Costas Los (Netherlands) Cor Euser	Spice SE90C	G	102
7	C	21	(United Kingdom) Spice Engineering	(Greece) Costas Los (Netherlands) Cor Euser	Ford Cosworth DFR 3.5L V8	G	102
8	C	15	(Switzerland) Brun Motorsport	(Argentina) Oscar Larrauri (Norway) Harald Huysman	Porsche 962C	Y	102
8	C	15	(Switzerland) Brun Motorsport	(Argentina) Oscar Larrauri (Norway) Harald Huysman	Porsche Type-935 3.0L Turbo Flat-6	Y	102
9	C	24	(Japan) Nissan Motorsports International	(United Kingdom) Kenny Acheson (Italy) Gianfranco Brancatelli	Nissan R90CK	D	102
9	C	24	(Japan) Nissan Motorsports International	(United Kingdom) Kenny Acheson (Italy) Gianfranco Brancatelli	Nissan VHR35Z 3.5L Turbo V8	D	102
10	C	13	(France) Courage Compétition	(France) Pascal Fabre (France) Lionel Robert	Cougar C24S	G	101
10	C	13	(France) Courage Compétition	(France) Pascal Fabre (France) Lionel Robert	Porsche Type-935 3.0L Turbo Flat-6	G	101
11	C	33	(Austria) Konrad Motorsport (West Germany) Dauer Racing	(Brazil) Raul Boesel	Porsche 962C	BF	101
11	C	33	(Austria) Konrad Motorsport (West Germany) Dauer Racing	(Brazil) Raul Boesel	Porsche Type-935 3.0L Turbo Flat-6	BF	101
12	C	9	(West Germany) Joest Porsche Racing	(West Germany) "John Winter" (Sweden) Stanley Dickens	Porsche 962C	MI	100
12	C	9	(West Germany) Joest Porsche Racing	(West Germany) "John Winter" (Sweden) Stanley Dickens	Porsche Type-935 3.2L Turbo Flat-6	MI	100
13	C	17	(Switzerland) Brun Motorsport	(West Germany) Otto Rensing (Switzerland) Bernard Santal	Porsche 962C	Y	100
13	C	17	(Switzerland) Brun Motorsport	(West Germany) Otto Rensing (Switzerland) Bernard Santal	Porsche Type-935 3.0L Turbo Flat-6	Y	100
14	C	32	(Austria) Konrad Motorsport	(Austria) Franz Konrad (Finland) Harri Toivonen	Porsche 962C	G	100
14	C	32	(Austria) Konrad Motorsport	(Austria) Franz Konrad (Finland) Harri Toivonen	Porsche Type-935 3.0L Turbo Flat-6	G	100
15	C	12	(France) Courage Compétition	(France) Michel Trollé (Switzerland) Bernard Thuner	Cougar C24S	G	99
15	C	12	(France) Courage Compétition	(France) Michel Trollé (Switzerland) Bernard Thuner	Porsche Type-935 3.0L Turbo Flat-6	G	99
16	C	27	(West Germany) Obermaier Racing	(West Germany) Jürgen Lässig (Germany) Otto Altenbach	Porsche 962C	G	99
16	C	27	(West Germany) Obermaier Racing	(West Germany) Jürgen Lässig (Germany) Otto Altenbach	Porsche Type-935 3.0L Turbo Flat-6	G	99
17	C	26	(West Germany) Obermaier Racing	(West Germany) Harald Grohs (West Germany) Jürgen Oppermann	Porsche 962C	G	98
17	C	26	(West Germany) Obermaier Racing	(West Germany) Harald Grohs (West Germany) Jürgen Oppermann	Porsche Type-935 3.0L Turbo Flat-6	G	98
18	C	10	(West Germany) Porsche Kremer Racing	(West Germany) Bernd Schneider (South Africa) Sarel van der Merwe	Porsche 962CK6	Y	98
18	C	10	(West Germany) Porsche Kremer Racing	(West Germany) Bernd Schneider (South Africa) Sarel van der Merwe	Porsche Type-935 3.0L Turbo Flat-6	Y	98
19	C	34	(France) Equipe Alméras Fréres	(France) Jacques Alméras (France) Jean-Marie Alméras	Porsche 962C	G	97
19	C	34	(France) Equipe Alméras Fréres	(France) Jacques Alméras (France) Jean-Marie Alméras	Porsche Type-935 3.0L Turbo Flat-6	G	97
20	C	39	(Switzerland) Swiss Team Salamin	(Switzerland) Antoine Salamin (Morocco) Max Cohen-Olivar	Porsche 962C	G	96
20	C	39	(Switzerland) Swiss Team Salamin	(Switzerland) Antoine Salamin (Morocco) Max Cohen-Olivar	Porsche Type-935 3.0L Turbo Flat-6	G	96
21	C	35	(France) Louis Descartes	(France) François Migault (France) François Wettling	ALD C289	D	86
21	C	35	(France) Louis Descartes	(France) François Migault (France) François Wettling	Ford Cosworth DFL 3.3L V8	D	86
22 DNF	C	37	(Japan) Toyota Team Tom's	(United Kingdom) Geoff Lees (Japan) Hitoshi Ogawa	Toyota 90C-V	B	96
22 DNF	C	37	(Japan) Toyota Team Tom's	(United Kingdom) Geoff Lees (Japan) Hitoshi Ogawa	Toyota R36V 3.6L Turbo V8	B	96
23 DNF	C	16	(Switzerland) Brun Motorsport	(Spain) Jesús Pareja (Switzerland) Walter Brun	Porsche 962C	Y	90
23 DNF	C	16	(Switzerland) Brun Motorsport	(Spain) Jesús Pareja (Switzerland) Walter Brun	Porsche Type-935 3.0L Turbo Flat-6	Y	90
24 DNF	C	11	(West Germany) Porsche Kremer Racing (United Kingdom) Convector	(United Kingdom) Anthony Reid (Sweden) Eje Elgh	Porsche 962C	D	72
24 DNF	C	11	(West Germany) Porsche Kremer Racing (United Kingdom) Convector	(United Kingdom) Anthony Reid (Sweden) Eje Elgh	Porsche Type-935 3.0L Turbo Flat-6	D	72
25 DNF	C	14	(United Kingdom) Richard Lloyd Racing	(West Germany) Manuel Reuter (Sweden) Steven Andskär	Porsche 962C GTi	G	71
25 DNF	C	14	(United Kingdom) Richard Lloyd Racing	(West Germany) Manuel Reuter (Sweden) Steven Andskär	Porsche Type-935 3.0L Turbo Flat-6	G	71
26 DNF	C	28	(United Kingdom) Chamberlain Engineering	(United Kingdom) Nick Adams (Netherlands) Charles Zwolsman	Spice SE89C	G	65
26 DNF	C	28	(United Kingdom) Chamberlain Engineering	(United Kingdom) Nick Adams (Netherlands) Charles Zwolsman	Ford Cosworth DFZ 3.5L V8	G	65
27 DNF	C	36	(Japan) Toyota Team Tom's	(United Kingdom) Johnny Dumfries (Italy) Roberto Ravaglia	Toyota 90C-V	B	50
27 DNF	C	36	(Japan) Toyota Team Tom's	(United Kingdom) Johnny Dumfries (Italy) Roberto Ravaglia	Toyota R36V 3.6L Turbo V8	B	50
28 DNF	C	40	(United Kingdom) The Berkeley Team London	(Italy) Ranieri Randaccio (Italy) Pasquale Barberio	Spice SE89C	G	49
28 DNF	C	40	(United Kingdom) The Berkeley Team London	(Italy) Ranieri Randaccio (Italy) Pasquale Barberio	Ford Cosworth DFZ 3.5L V8	G	49
29 DNF	C	8	(West Germany) Joest Porsche Racing	(United Kingdom) Jonathan Palmer (West Germany) Hans-Joachim Stuck	Porsche 962C	MI	16
29 DNF	C	8	(West Germany) Joest Porsche Racing	(United Kingdom) Jonathan Palmer (West Germany) Hans-Joachim Stuck	Porsche Type-935 3.2L Turbo Flat-6	MI	16
DNS	C	22	(United Kingdom) Spice Engineering	(Greece) Costas Los (Netherlands) Cor Euser	Spice SE90C	G	-
DNS	C	22	(United Kingdom) Spice Engineering	(Greece) Costas Los (Netherlands) Cor Euser	Ford Cosworth DFR 3.5L V8	G	-
DNQ	C	6	(West Germany) Joest Racing	(France) Jean-Louis Ricci	Porsche 962C	D	-
DNQ	C	6	(West Germany) Joest Racing	(France) Jean-Louis Ricci	Porsche Type-935 3.0L Turbo Flat-6	D	-
DNQ	C	30	(United Kingdom) GP Motorsport	(Italy) Beppe Gabbiani (United Kingdom) Richard Jones	Spice SE90C	D	-
DNQ	C	30	(United Kingdom) GP Motorsport	(Italy) Beppe Gabbiani (United Kingdom) Richard Jones	Ford Cosworth DFZ 3.5L V8	D	-
DNQ	C	41	(Italy) Alba Formula Team	(Italy) Gianfranco Trombetti (Italy) Marco Brand	Alba AR20	G	-
DNQ	C	41	(Italy) Alba Formula Team	(Italy) Gianfranco Trombetti (Italy) Marco Brand	Buick 4.5L V6	G	-

== Statistics ==
- Pole Position - #1 Jean-Louis Schlesser - 1:20.344
- Fastest Lap - #1 Jean-Louis Schlesser - 1:26.092
- Average Speed - 181.377 km/h

World Sportscar Championship
Previous race: 1990 480 km of Dijon	1990 season	Next race: 1990 480 km of Donington
