= 1990 480 km of Silverstone =

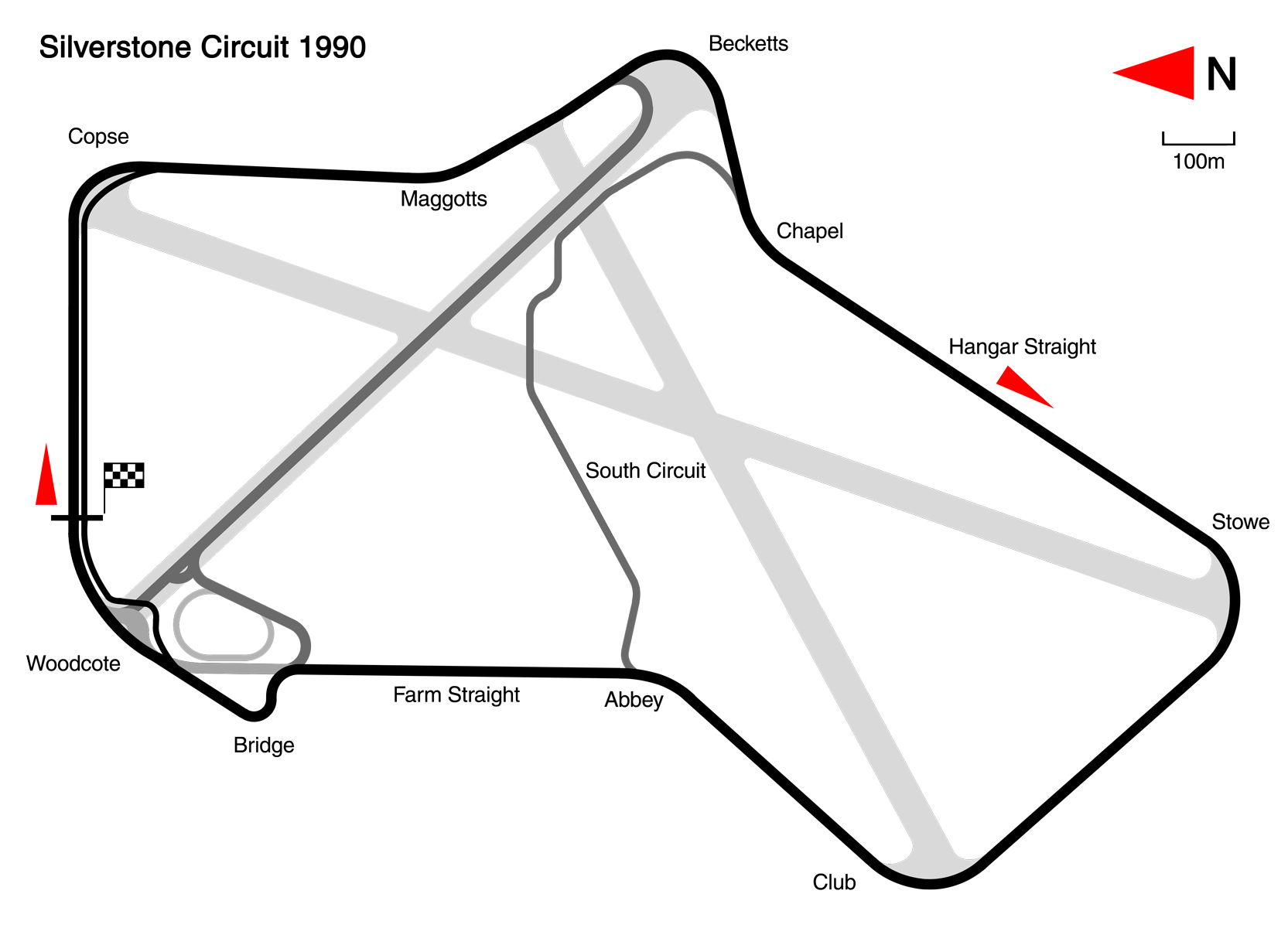
Map of the Silverstone Circuit (1990)

The 1990 480 km of Silverstone was the third round of the 1990 World Sportscar Championship season, taking place at Silverstone Circuit, United Kingdom. It took place on 20 May 1990.

== Official results ==
Class winners in bold. Cars failing to complete 75% of the winner's distance marked as Not Classified (NC).

| Pos | Class | No | Team | Drivers | Chassis | Tyre | Laps |
| Pos | Class | No | Team | Drivers | Engine | Tyre | Laps |
|---|---|---|---|---|---|---|---|
| 1 | **C** | **3** | **(United Kingdom) Silk Cut Jaguar** | **(United Kingdom) Martin Brundle (France) Alain Ferté** | **Jaguar XJR-11** | G | **101** |
| 1 | **C** | **3** | **(United Kingdom) Silk Cut Jaguar** | **(United Kingdom) Martin Brundle (France) Alain Ferté** | **Jaguar JV6 3.5L Turbo V6** | G | **101** |
| 2 | C | 4 | (United Kingdom) Silk Cut Jaguar | (United Kingdom) Andy Wallace (Netherlands) Jan Lammers | Jaguar XJR-11 | G | 100 |
| 2 | C | 4 | (United Kingdom) Silk Cut Jaguar | (United Kingdom) Andy Wallace (Netherlands) Jan Lammers | Jaguar JV6 3.5L Turbo V6 | G | 100 |
| 3 | C | 21 | (United Kingdom) Spice Engineering | (Italy) Bruno Giacomelli (Spain) Fermín Vélez | Spice SE90C | G | 100 |
| 3 | C | 21 | (United Kingdom) Spice Engineering | (Italy) Bruno Giacomelli (Spain) Fermín Vélez | Ford Cosworth DFR 3.5L V8 | G | 100 |
| 4 | C | 7 | (Germany) Joest Porsche Racing | (France) Bob Wollek (Germany) Frank Jelinski | Porsche 962C | MI | 99 |
| 4 | C | 7 | (Germany) Joest Porsche Racing | (France) Bob Wollek (Germany) Frank Jelinski | Porsche Type-935 3.2L Turbo Flat-6 | MI | 99 |
| 5 | C | 10 | (Germany) Porsche Kremer Racing | (Germany) Bernd Schneider (Sweden) Steven Andskär | Porsche 962CK6 | Y | 98 |
| 5 | C | 10 | (Germany) Porsche Kremer Racing | (Germany) Bernd Schneider (Sweden) Steven Andskär | Porsche Type-935 3.0L Turbo Flat-6 | Y | 98 |
| 6 | C | 15 | (Switzerland) Brun Motorsport | (Argentina) Oscar Larrauri (Norway) Harald Huysman | Porsche 962C | Y | 97 |
| 6 | C | 15 | (Switzerland) Brun Motorsport | (Argentina) Oscar Larrauri (Norway) Harald Huysman | Porsche Type-935 3.0L Turbo Flat-6 | Y | 97 |
| 7 | C | 16 | (Switzerland) Brun Motorsport | (Switzerland) Walter Brun (Spain) Jesús Pareja | Porsche 962C | Y | 97 |
| 7 | C | 16 | (Switzerland) Brun Motorsport | (Switzerland) Walter Brun (Spain) Jesús Pareja | Porsche Type-935 3.0L Turbo Flat-6 | Y | 97 |
| 8 | C | 17 | (Switzerland) Brun Motorsport | (Switzerland) Bernard Santal (Italy) Massimo Sigala | Porsche 962C | Y | 96 |
| 8 | C | 17 | (Switzerland) Brun Motorsport | (Switzerland) Bernard Santal (Italy) Massimo Sigala | Porsche Type-935 3.0L Turbo Flat-6 | Y | 96 |
| 9 | C | 11 | (Germany) Porsche Kremer Racing (United Kingdom) Convector | (United Kingdom) Anthony Reid (Sweden) Eje Elgh | Porsche 962CK6 | Y | 96 |
| 9 | C | 11 | (Germany) Porsche Kremer Racing (United Kingdom) Convector | (United Kingdom) Anthony Reid (Sweden) Eje Elgh | Porsche Type-935 3.0L Turbo Flat-6 | Y | 96 |
| 10 | C | 26 | (Germany) Obermaier Racing | (Germany) Harald Grohs (Germany) Jürgen Oppermann | Porsche 962C | G | 96 |
| 10 | C | 26 | (Germany) Obermaier Racing | (Germany) Harald Grohs (Germany) Jürgen Oppermann | Porsche Type-935 3.0L Turbo Flat-6 | G | 96 |
| 11 | C | 14 | (United Kingdom) Richard Lloyd Racing | (United Kingdom) James Weaver (Germany) Manuel Reuter | Porsche 962C GTi | G | 96 |
| 11 | C | 14 | (United Kingdom) Richard Lloyd Racing | (United Kingdom) James Weaver (Germany) Manuel Reuter | Porsche Type-935 3.0L Turbo Flat-6 | G | 96 |
| 12 | C | 36 | (Japan) Toyota Team Tom's | (United Kingdom) Geoff Lees (United Kingdom) John Watson | Toyota 90C-V | B | 95 |
| 12 | C | 36 | (Japan) Toyota Team Tom's | (United Kingdom) Geoff Lees (United Kingdom) John Watson | Toyota R36V 3.6L Turbo V8 | B | 95 |
| 13 | C | 19 | (United Kingdom) Team Davey | (Italy) Giovanni Lavaggi (United Kingdom) Tim Lee-Davey | Porsche 962C | D | 95 |
| 13 | C | 19 | (United Kingdom) Team Davey | (Italy) Giovanni Lavaggi (United Kingdom) Tim Lee-Davey | Porsche Type-935 3.0L Turbo Flat-6 | D | 95 |
| 14 | C | 32 | (Austria) Konrad Motorsport | (Austria) Franz Konrad (Finland) Harri Toivonen | Porsche 962C | G | 93 |
| 14 | C | 32 | (Austria) Konrad Motorsport | (Austria) Franz Konrad (Finland) Harri Toivonen | Porsche Type-935 3.0L Turbo Flat-6 | G | 93 |
| 15 | C | 13 | (France) Courage Compétition | (France) Pascal Fabre (France) Michel Trollé | Cougar C24S | G | 93 |
| 15 | C | 13 | (France) Courage Compétition | (France) Pascal Fabre (France) Michel Trollé | Porsche Type-935 3.0L Turbo Flat-6 | G | 93 |
| 16 | C | 12 | (France) Courage Compétition | (Switzerland) Bernard Thuner (Greece) Costas Los | Cougar C24S | G | 92 |
| 16 | C | 12 | (France) Courage Compétition | (Switzerland) Bernard Thuner (Greece) Costas Los | Porsche Type-935 2.8L Turbo Flat-6 | G | 92 |
| 17 | C | 29 | (United Kingdom) Chamberlain Engineering | (United Kingdom) Nick Adams (United Kingdom) Richard Piper | Spice SE89C | G | 90 |
| 17 | C | 29 | (United Kingdom) Chamberlain Engineering | (United Kingdom) Nick Adams (United Kingdom) Richard Piper | Ford Cosworth DFZ 3.5L V8 | G | 90 |
| 18 | C | 27 | (Germany) Obermaier Racing | (Germany) Otto Altenbach (Germany) Jürgen Lässig | Porsche 962C | G | 88 |
| 18 | C | 27 | (Germany) Obermaier Racing | (Germany) Otto Altenbach (Germany) Jürgen Lässig | Porsche Type-935 3.0L Turbo Flat-6 | G | 88 |
| 19 | C | 40 | (United Kingdom) The Berkeley Team London | (Italy) Ranieri Randaccio (Italy) "Stingbrace" | Spice SE89C | G | 87 |
| 19 | C | 40 | (United Kingdom) The Berkeley Team London | (Italy) Ranieri Randaccio (Italy) "Stingbrace" | Ford Cosworth DFZ 3.5L V8 | G | 87 |
| 20 | C | 35 | (France) Louis Descartes | (France) François Migault (France) Denis Morin | ALD C289 | D | 78 |
| 20 | C | 35 | (France) Louis Descartes | (France) François Migault (France) Denis Morin | Ford Cosworth DFZ 3.5L V8 | D | 78 |
| 21 NC^{†} | C | 24 | (Japan) Nissan Motorsports International | (United Kingdom) Mark Blundell (Italy) Gianfranco Brancatelli | Nissan R90CK | D | 99 |
| 21 NC^{†} | C | 24 | (Japan) Nissan Motorsports International | (United Kingdom) Mark Blundell (Italy) Gianfranco Brancatelli | Nissan VRH35Z 3.5L Turbo V8 | D | 99 |
| 22 NC^{†} | C | 20 | (United Kingdom) Team Davey | (United Kingdom) Paul Scott (Mexico) Alfonso Toledano | Porsche 962C | D | 94 |
| 22 NC^{†} | C | 20 | (United Kingdom) Team Davey | (United Kingdom) Paul Scott (Mexico) Alfonso Toledano | Porsche Type-935 2.8L Turbo Flat-6 | D | 94 |
| 23 DNF | C | 23 | (Japan) Nissan Motorsports International | (United Kingdom) Kenny Acheson (United Kingdom) Julian Bailey | Nissan R90CK | D | 92 |
| 23 DNF | C | 23 | (Japan) Nissan Motorsports International | (United Kingdom) Kenny Acheson (United Kingdom) Julian Bailey | Nissan VRH35Z 3.5L Turbo V8 | D | 92 |
| 24 DNF | C | 37 | (Japan) Toyota Team Tom's | (United Kingdom) Johnny Dumfries (Japan) Hitoshi Ogawa | Toyota 90C-V | B | 92 |
| 24 DNF | C | 37 | (Japan) Toyota Team Tom's | (United Kingdom) Johnny Dumfries (Japan) Hitoshi Ogawa | Toyota R36V 3.6L Turbo V8 | B | 92 |
| 25 DNF | C | 8 | (Germany) Joest Porsche Racing | (United Kingdom) Tiff Needell (United Kingdom) Jonathan Palmer | Porsche 962C | MI | 70 |
| 25 DNF | C | 8 | (Germany) Joest Porsche Racing | (United Kingdom) Tiff Needell (United Kingdom) Jonathan Palmer | Porsche Type-935 3.2L Turbo Flat-6 | MI | 70 |
| 26 DNF | C | 22 | (United Kingdom) Spice Engineering | (United Kingdom) Tim Harvey (South Africa) Wayne Taylor | Spice SE90C | G | 70 |
| 26 DNF | C | 22 | (United Kingdom) Spice Engineering | (United Kingdom) Tim Harvey (South Africa) Wayne Taylor | Ford Cosworth DFR 3.5L V8 | G | 70 |
| 27 DNF | C | 1 | (Germany) Team Sauber Mercedes | (France) Jean-Louis Schlesser (Italy) Mauro Baldi | Mercedes-Benz C11 | G | 40 |
| 27 DNF | C | 1 | (Germany) Team Sauber Mercedes | (France) Jean-Louis Schlesser (Italy) Mauro Baldi | Mercedes-Benz M119 5.0L Turbo V8 | G | 40 |
| 28 DNF | C | 30 | (United Kingdom) GP Motorsport | (France) Philippe de Henning (Finland) Jari Nurminen | Spice SE90C | D | 35 |
| 28 DNF | C | 30 | (United Kingdom) GP Motorsport | (France) Philippe de Henning (Finland) Jari Nurminen | Ford Cosworth DFR 3.5L V8 | D | 35 |
| 29 DNF | C | 28 | (United Kingdom) Chamberlain Engineering | (Netherlands) Cor Euser (Switzerland) Mario Hytten | Spice SE89C | G | 32 |
| 29 DNF | C | 28 | (United Kingdom) Chamberlain Engineering | (Netherlands) Cor Euser (Switzerland) Mario Hytten | Ford Cosworth DFZ 3.5L V8 | G | 32 |
| 30 DNF | C | 31 | (United Kingdom) GP Motorsport | (United Kingdom) Dudley Wood (Italy) Pasquale Barberio | Spice SE87C | D | 16 |
| 30 DNF | C | 31 | (United Kingdom) GP Motorsport | (United Kingdom) Dudley Wood (Italy) Pasquale Barberio | Ford Cosworth DFZ 3.5L V8 | D | 16 |
| 31 DNF | C | 9 | (Germany) Joest Porsche Racing | (Sweden) Stanley Dickens (Germany) "John Winter" | Porsche 962C | MI | 3 |
| 31 DNF | C | 9 | (Germany) Joest Porsche Racing | (Sweden) Stanley Dickens (Germany) "John Winter" | Porsche Type-935 3.0L Turbo Flat-6 | MI | 3 |
| DNS | C | 33 | (Austria) Konrad Motorsport (Germany) Dauer Racing | (France) Henri Pescarolo (United Kingdom) Derek Bell | Porsche 962C | BF | - |
| DNS | C | 33 | (Austria) Konrad Motorsport (Germany) Dauer Racing | (France) Henri Pescarolo (United Kingdom) Derek Bell | Porsche Type-935 3.0L Turbo Flat-6 | BF | - |
| DNS | C | 39 | (Switzerland) Swiss Team Salamin | (Italy) Luigi Taverna (Switzerland) Antoine Salamin | Porsche 962C | G | - |
| DNS | C | 39 | (Switzerland) Swiss Team Salamin | (Italy) Luigi Taverna (Switzerland) Antoine Salamin | Porsche Type-935 3.0L Turbo Flat-6 | G | - |
| DNQ^{‡} | C | 2 | (Germany) Team Sauber Mercedes | (Germany) Jochen Mass (Germany) Michael Schumacher | Mercedes-Benz C11 | G | - |
| DNQ^{‡} | C | 2 | (Germany) Team Sauber Mercedes | (Germany) Jochen Mass (Germany) Michael Schumacher | Mercedes-Benz M119 5.0L Turbo V8 | G | - |
| DNQ | C | 34 | (France) Equipe Alméras Fréres | (France) Jacques Alméras (France) Jean-Marie Alméras | Porsche 962C | G | - |
| DNQ | C | 34 | (France) Equipe Alméras Fréres | (France) Jacques Alméras (France) Jean-Marie Alméras | Porsche Type-935 2.8L Turbo Flat-6 | G | - |
| DNQ | C | 41 | (Italy) Alba Formula Team | (Italy) Marco Brand | Alba AR20 | G | - |
| DNQ | C | 41 | (Italy) Alba Formula Team | (Italy) Marco Brand | Subaru (Motori Moderni) 1235 3.5L Flat-12 | G | - |

† - #24 Nissan Motorsports Intl. and #20 Team Davey were listed as not classified due to taking too long to complete the final race lap.

‡ - #2 Team Sauber Mercedes had its qualifying times disallowed for receiving outside assistance while on the track during the qualifying session.

== Statistics ==
- Pole Position - Jean-Louis Schlesser (#1 Team Sauber Mercedes) - 1:12.073
- Fastest Lap - Jean-Louis Schlesser (#1 Team Sauber Mercedes) - 1:16.649
- Average Speed - 207.413 km/h

World Sportscar Championship
| Previous race: 1990 480 km of Monza | 1990 season | Next race: 1990 480 km of Spa |
