= 1990 480 km of Mexico City =

Layout of the Autódromo Hermanos Rodríguez (1986–2014)

The 1990 480 km of Mexico City was the ninth and final round of the 1990 World Sportscar Championship season, taking place at Autodromo Hermanos Rodriguez, Mexico. It took place on October 7, 1990.

== Official results ==
Class winners in bold. Cars failing to complete 75% of the winner's distance marked as Not Classified (NC).

| Pos | Class | No | Team | Drivers | Chassis | Tyre | Laps |
| Pos | Class | No | Team | Drivers | Engine | Tyre | Laps |
|---|---|---|---|---|---|---|---|
| 1 | **C** | **2** | **(Germany) Team Sauber Mercedes** | **(Germany) Jochen Mass (Germany) Michael Schumacher** | **Mercedes-Benz C11** | G | **109** |
| 1 | **C** | **2** | **(Germany) Team Sauber Mercedes** | **(Germany) Jochen Mass (Germany) Michael Schumacher** | **Mercedes-Benz M119 5.0L Turbo V8** | G | **109** |
| 2 | C | 23 | (Japan) Nissan Motorsports International | (United Kingdom) Julian Bailey (United Kingdom) Mark Blundell | Nissan R90CK | D | 107 |
| 2 | C | 23 | (Japan) Nissan Motorsports International | (United Kingdom) Julian Bailey (United Kingdom) Mark Blundell | Nissan VHR35Z 3.5L Turbo V8 | D | 107 |
| 3 | C | 4 | (United Kingdom) Silk Cut Jaguar | (United Kingdom) Andy Wallace (United States) Davy Jones | Jaguar XJR-11 | G | 107 |
| 3 | C | 4 | (United Kingdom) Silk Cut Jaguar | (United Kingdom) Andy Wallace (United States) Davy Jones | Jaguar JV6 3.5L Turbo V6 | G | 107 |
| 4 | C | 24 | (Japan) Nissan Motorsports International | (United Kingdom) Kenny Acheson (Italy) Gianfranco Brancatelli | Nissan R90CK | D | 106 |
| 4 | C | 24 | (Japan) Nissan Motorsports International | (United Kingdom) Kenny Acheson (Italy) Gianfranco Brancatelli | Nissan VHR35Z 3.5L Turbo V8 | D | 106 |
| 5 | C | 8 | (Germany) Joest Porsche Racing | (United Kingdom) Jonathan Palmer (Germany) Hans-Joachim Stuck | Porsche 962C | MI | 106 |
| 5 | C | 8 | (Germany) Joest Porsche Racing | (United Kingdom) Jonathan Palmer (Germany) Hans-Joachim Stuck | Porsche Type-935 3.2L Turbo Flat-6 | MI | 106 |
| 6 | C | 7 | (Germany) Joest Porsche Racing | (France) Bob Wollek (Germany) Frank Jelinski | Porsche 962C | MI | 105 |
| 6 | C | 7 | (Germany) Joest Porsche Racing | (France) Bob Wollek (Germany) Frank Jelinski | Porsche Type-935 3.2L Turbo Flat-6 | MI | 105 |
| 7 | C | 10 | (Germany) Porsche Kremer Racing | (Germany) Bernd Schneider (Mexico) Tomas Lopez | Porsche 962CK6 | Y | 105 |
| 7 | C | 10 | (Germany) Porsche Kremer Racing | (Germany) Bernd Schneider (Mexico) Tomas Lopez | Porsche Type-935 3.0L Turbo Flat-6 | Y | 105 |
| 8 | C | 9 | (Germany) Joest Racing | (France) Henri Pescarolo (Germany) "John Winter" | Porsche 962C | G | 103 |
| 8 | C | 9 | (Germany) Joest Racing | (France) Henri Pescarolo (Germany) "John Winter" | Porsche Type-935 3.0L Turbo Flat-6 | G | 103 |
| 9 | C | 27 | (Germany) Obermaier Racing | (Germany) Otto Altenbach (Germany) Harald Grohs | Porsche 962C | G | 103 |
| 9 | C | 27 | (Germany) Obermaier Racing | (Germany) Otto Altenbach (Germany) Harald Grohs | Porsche Type-935 3.0L Turbo Flat-6 | G | 103 |
| 10 | C | 21 | (United Kingdom) Spice Engineering | (Spain) Fermín Vélez (Chile) Eliseo Salazar | Spice SE90C | G | 103 |
| 10 | C | 21 | (United Kingdom) Spice Engineering | (Spain) Fermín Vélez (Chile) Eliseo Salazar | Ford Cosworth DFR 3.5L V8 | G | 103 |
| 11 | C | 13 | (France) Courage Compétition | (France) Pascal Fabre (France) Michel Trollé | Cougar C24S | G | 102 |
| 11 | C | 13 | (France) Courage Compétition | (France) Pascal Fabre (France) Michel Trollé | Porsche Type-935 3.0L Turbo Flat-6 | G | 102 |
| 12 | C | 32 | (Austria) Konrad Motorsport | (Austria) Franz Konrad (Finland) Harri Toivonen | Porsche 962C | G | 102 |
| 12 | C | 32 | (Austria) Konrad Motorsport | (Austria) Franz Konrad (Finland) Harri Toivonen | Porsche Type-935 3.0L Turbo Flat-6 | G | 102 |
| 13 | C | 44 | (France) Peugeot Talbot Sport | (Finland) Keke Rosberg (France) Jean-Pierre Jabouille | Peugeot 905 | MI | 101 |
| 13 | C | 44 | (France) Peugeot Talbot Sport | (Finland) Keke Rosberg (France) Jean-Pierre Jabouille | Peugeot SA35 3.5L V10 | MI | 101 |
| 14 | C | 30 | (United Kingdom) GP Motorsport | (United States) Tom Hessert (Mexico) Enrique Contreras | Spice SE90C | D | 91 |
| 14 | C | 30 | (United Kingdom) GP Motorsport | (United States) Tom Hessert (Mexico) Enrique Contreras | Ford Cosworth DFZ 3.5L V8 | D | 91 |
| 15 | C | 20 | (United Kingdom) Team Davey | (Mexico) Bernard Jourdain (Mexico) Michel Jourdain | Porsche 962C | D | 88 |
| 15 | C | 20 | (United Kingdom) Team Davey | (Mexico) Bernard Jourdain (Mexico) Michel Jourdain | Porsche Type-935 3.0L Turbo Flat-6 | D | 88 |
| 16 | C | 41 | (Italy) Alba Formula | (Italy) Giorgio Francia (France) François Migault | Alba AR20 | G | 85 |
| 16 | C | 41 | (Italy) Alba Formula | (Italy) Giorgio Francia (France) François Migault | Buick 4.5L V6 | G | 85 |
| 17 DSQ^{†} | C | 1 | (Germany) Team Sauber Mercedes | (France) Jean-Louis Schlesser (Italy) Mauro Baldi | Mercedes-Benz C11 | G | 109 |
| 17 DSQ^{†} | C | 1 | (Germany) Team Sauber Mercedes | (France) Jean-Louis Schlesser (Italy) Mauro Baldi | Mercedes-Benz M119 5.0L Turbo V8 | G | 109 |
| 18 DNF | C | 34 | (France) Equipe Alméras Fréres | (France) Jacques Alméras (France) Jean-Marie Alméras | Porsche 962C | G | 75 |
| 18 DNF | C | 34 | (France) Equipe Alméras Fréres | (France) Jacques Alméras (France) Jean-Marie Alméras | Porsche Type-935 3.0L Turbo Flat-6 | G | 75 |
| 19 DNF | C | 36 | (Japan) Toyota Team Tom's | (United Kingdom) Johnny Dumfries (Italy) Roberto Ravaglia | Toyota 90C-V | B | 70 |
| 19 DNF | C | 36 | (Japan) Toyota Team Tom's | (United Kingdom) Johnny Dumfries (Italy) Roberto Ravaglia | Toyota R36V 3.6L Turbo V8 | B | 70 |
| 20 DNF | C | 15 | (Switzerland) Brun Motorsport | (Argentina) Oscar Larrauri | Porsche 962C | Y | 65 |
| 20 DNF | C | 15 | (Switzerland) Brun Motorsport | (Argentina) Oscar Larrauri | Porsche Type-935 3.0L Turbo Flat-6 | Y | 65 |
| 21 DNF | C | 16 | (Switzerland) Brun Motorsport | (Spain) Jesús Pareja (Switzerland) Walter Brun | Porsche 962C | Y | 56 |
| 21 DNF | C | 16 | (Switzerland) Brun Motorsport | (Spain) Jesús Pareja (Switzerland) Walter Brun | Porsche Type-935 3.0L Turbo Flat-6 | Y | 56 |
| 22 DNF | C | 39 | (Switzerland) Swiss Team Salamin | (Switzerland) Antoine Salamin (Morocco) Max Cohen-Olivar | Porsche 962C | G | 52 |
| 22 DNF | C | 39 | (Switzerland) Swiss Team Salamin | (Switzerland) Antoine Salamin (Morocco) Max Cohen-Olivar | Porsche Type-935 3.0L Turbo Flat-6 | G | 52 |
| 23 DNF | C | 3 | (United Kingdom) Silk Cut Jaguar | (United Kingdom) Martin Brundle (Netherlands) Jan Lammers | Jaguar XJR-11 | G | 46 |
| 23 DNF | C | 3 | (United Kingdom) Silk Cut Jaguar | (United Kingdom) Martin Brundle (Netherlands) Jan Lammers | Jaguar JV6 3.5L Turbo V6 | G | 46 |
| 24 DNF | C | 14 | (United Kingdom) Richard Lloyd Racing | (Germany) Manuel Reuter (United Kingdom) Perry McCarthy | Porsche 962C GTi | G | 42 |
| 24 DNF | C | 14 | (United Kingdom) Richard Lloyd Racing | (Germany) Manuel Reuter (United Kingdom) Perry McCarthy | Porsche Type-935 3.0L Turbo Flat-6 | G | 42 |
| 25 DNF | C | 29 | (United Kingdom) Chamberlain Engineering | (United Kingdom) Richard Piper (Netherlands) Charles Zwolsman | Spice SE89C | G | 23 |
| 25 DNF | C | 29 | (United Kingdom) Chamberlain Engineering | (United Kingdom) Richard Piper (Netherlands) Charles Zwolsman | Ford Cosworth DFZ 3.5L V8 | G | 23 |
| 26 DNF | C | 37 | (Japan) Toyota Team Tom's | (United Kingdom) Geoff Lees (United Kingdom) John Watson | Toyota 89C-V | B | 15 |
| 26 DNF | C | 37 | (Japan) Toyota Team Tom's | (United Kingdom) Geoff Lees (United Kingdom) John Watson | Toyota R36V 3.6L Turbo V8 | B | 15 |
| 27 DNF | C | 40 | (United Kingdom) The Berkeley Team London | (Italy) Pasquale Barberio (Italy) "Stingbrace" | Spice SE89C | G | 0 |
| 27 DNF | C | 40 | (United Kingdom) The Berkeley Team London | (Italy) Pasquale Barberio (Italy) "Stingbrace" | Ford Cosworth DFZ | G | 0 |
| DNS | C | 17 | (Switzerland) Brun Motorsport | (Switzerland) Bernard Santal (Italy) Massimo Sigala | Porsche 962C | Y | - |
| DNS | C | 17 | (Switzerland) Brun Motorsport | (Switzerland) Bernard Santal (Italy) Massimo Sigala | Porsche Type-935 3.0L Turbo Flat-6 | Y | - |
| DNS | C | 26 | (Germany) Obermaier Racing | (Germany) Otto Altenbach (Germany) Harald Grohs | Porsche 962C | G | - |
| DNS | C | 26 | (Germany) Obermaier Racing | (Germany) Otto Altenbach (Germany) Harald Grohs | Porsche Type-935 3.0L Turbo Flat-6 | G | - |

† - #1 Team Sauber Mercedes was disqualified for using more than its allowed amount of fuel.

== Statistics ==
- Pole Position - #3 Silk Cut Jaguar - 1:20.626
- Fastest Lap - #2 Team Sauber Mercedes - 1:23.250
- Average Speed - 172.19 km/h

World Sportscar Championship
| Previous race: 1990 480 km of Montreal | 1990 season | Next race: None |
