= Tim Lee-Davey =

British former racing driver (born 1955)

Tim-Lee Davey
- Nationality: British
- Born: February 20, 1955 (age 71) Pembury, Kent

Previous series
- 1989-1990 1986-1990 1984-1985 1981-1983 1980: JSPC; World Sportscar Championship; Thundersports and 1985 Le Mans; British Formula 3 Formula Ford 1600

Championship titles
- 1980: Dunlop Star of Tomorrow Formula Ford 1600 Championship

Awards
- 1980, 1985: Grovewood Award Special Commendation, Winner of The Gold Cup

Tim Lee-Davey (born 20 February 1955) is a British former racing driver.

Lee-Davey was a member of the British Kart Team and was the Dunlop Star of Tomorrow Formula Ford Champion in 1980 driving the ex-James Weaver Tiga FF79 in his first full year of motor racing. He was also awarded a Grovewood Award Special Commendation that year.

Seriously under financed, Lee-Davey finished 17th in the British Formula Three championship in 1982 and 12th in 1983. In 1984, he switched to sports cars, campaigning a unique 2 litre Tiga TS84 in the UK Thundersports Series and proved to be a front-runner against much more powerful opposition even winning the Snetterton round of the series outright.

For 1985, Lee-Davey again competed in the UK Thundersports series, this time with a Tiga GC84 powered by a 3.9 litre Cosworth DFL engine. With this car, partnered by Neil Crang, Tim won the Gold Cup at Oulton Park by four laps and was a regular front runner. The pair were joined by Tony Lanfranchi for that year's Le Mans 24 Hours but were unclassified (although seventh in the C2 class) completing 226 laps after car problems. Lee-Davey then competed in the World Sportscar Championship from 1986 to 1990 and selected races in the All-Japan Sports Prototype Endurance Championship.

In 1988, after Lee-Davey's latest Tiga was destroyed by fire at Brno, Team Davey obtained a new Porsche 962 and continued competing in the World Sports Prototype Championship. For 1990, the team entered two cars. In the 1989 24 Hours of Le Mans driving a Porsche 962C Lee-Davey, driving with Tom Dodd-Noble and Katsunori Iketani, finished 15th. In 1990, the team used the new Schuppan carbon fibre monocoques. Driving both cars entered for Le Mans by his own under financed Team Davey, Lee-Davey finished 19th, co-driven by Giovanni Lavaggi, and 26th co-driven by Max Cohen-Olivar and Katsunori Iketani, with both cars classified.

Tim's father Lionel (Lee) Davey who was a successful businessman, founding Lee-Davey Caravans based in Harrietsham, Kent, strongly opposed his son's motor racing career and consistently refused any financial support considering it "the end of a promising law career and the start of a tenuous motor racing existence". Nonetheless, Lee-Davey senior regularly expressed considerable pride in his son's achievements.

== Works cited ==
- Cotton, Mike (February 1991). "Interview - Tim Lee-Davey". Motor Sport Magazine.
