= Otto Altenbach =

German racing driver

- Born: 31 May 1948 (age 77)
- Occupation: Racing Driver

Otto Altenbach (born 31 May 1948) is a German retired racing driver. Altenbach was a sports car driver between 1984 and 2001.
