= Michel Trollé =

French racing driver (born 1959)

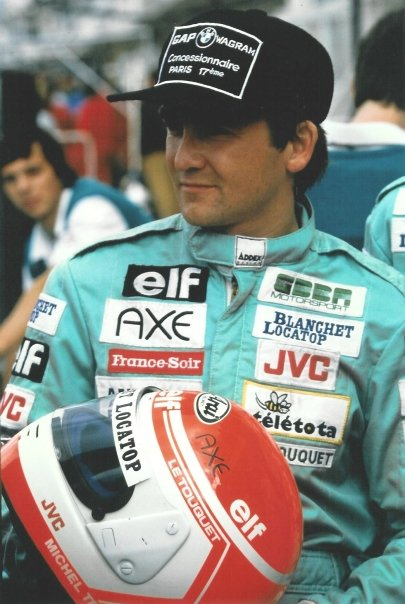
Trollé when he drove in International Formula 3000

Michel Trollé (born 23 June 1959) is a French former racing driver from Lens, Pas-de-Calais.

Trollé began his career in Championnat de France Formule Renault Turbo in 1984, finishing second in the championship.

In 1985, Trollé moved to the French Formula Three Championship and finished third in points with two wins.

In 1986, Trollé participated in a handful of major Formula Three races including the Macau Grand Prix and participated in one World Sports-Prototype Championship race in a Porsche 962C for John Fitzpatrick Racing.

In 1987, Trollé made his International Formula 3000 debut and finished second in his first race and won the third race of the season at Circuit de Spa-Francorchamps. Trollé finished sixth in the championship.

Trollé returned to the series in 1988 but his season was curtailed after a serious accident at Brands Hatch. However, he still finished 11th in points on the strength of two podium finishes in the first six races.

Trollé was regarded as one of the best of a promising crop of French drivers and had held discussions with both Larrousse and Tyrrell for an F1 seat in 1989. He was due to sign a provisional agreement with Tyrrell at the Belgian Grand Prix, to be held the weekend after the Brands Hatch Formula 3000 race.

In 1990, Trollé moved to sports cars part-time and participated in the World Sports-Prototype Championship for Courage Compétition and made his 24 Hours of Le Mans debut with the team, finishing seventh overall.

Trollé returned to Courage in the Sportscar World Championship in 1991 for three races in what would be his last professional racing starts.

== 24 Hours of Le Mans results ==
Year	Team	Co-Drivers	Car	Class	Laps	Pos.	Class Pos.
1986	(United Kingdom) John Fitzpatrick Racing	(France) Philippe Alliot (Spain) Paco Romero	Porsche 962C	C1	312	10th	8th
1987	(Switzerland) Brun Motorsport	(France) Paul Belmondo (France) Pierre de Thoisy	Porsche 962C	C1	88	DNF	DNF
1988	(Japan) Italiya Sport (Japan) Team Le Mans Co.	(United States) Danny Ongais (Japan) Toshio Suzuki	March 88S-Nissan	C1	74	DNF	DNF
1990	(France) Courage Compétition	(France) Pascal Fabre (France) Lionel Robert	Cougar C24S-Porsche	C1	347	7th	7th
1991	(France) Courage Compétition	(Canada) Claude Bourbonnais (Italy) Marco Brand	Cougar C26S-Porsche	C2	293	NC	NC
