= Jacques Alméras =

French racing driver (born 1949)

Jacques Marc Alméras (born 30 January 1949 in Montpellier) is a French former racing driver and co-founder of Alméras Frères with his brother Jean-Marie Alméras. He competed in endurance racing, rally and speed hill climbing.
