= Jean-Marie Alméras =

French racing driver

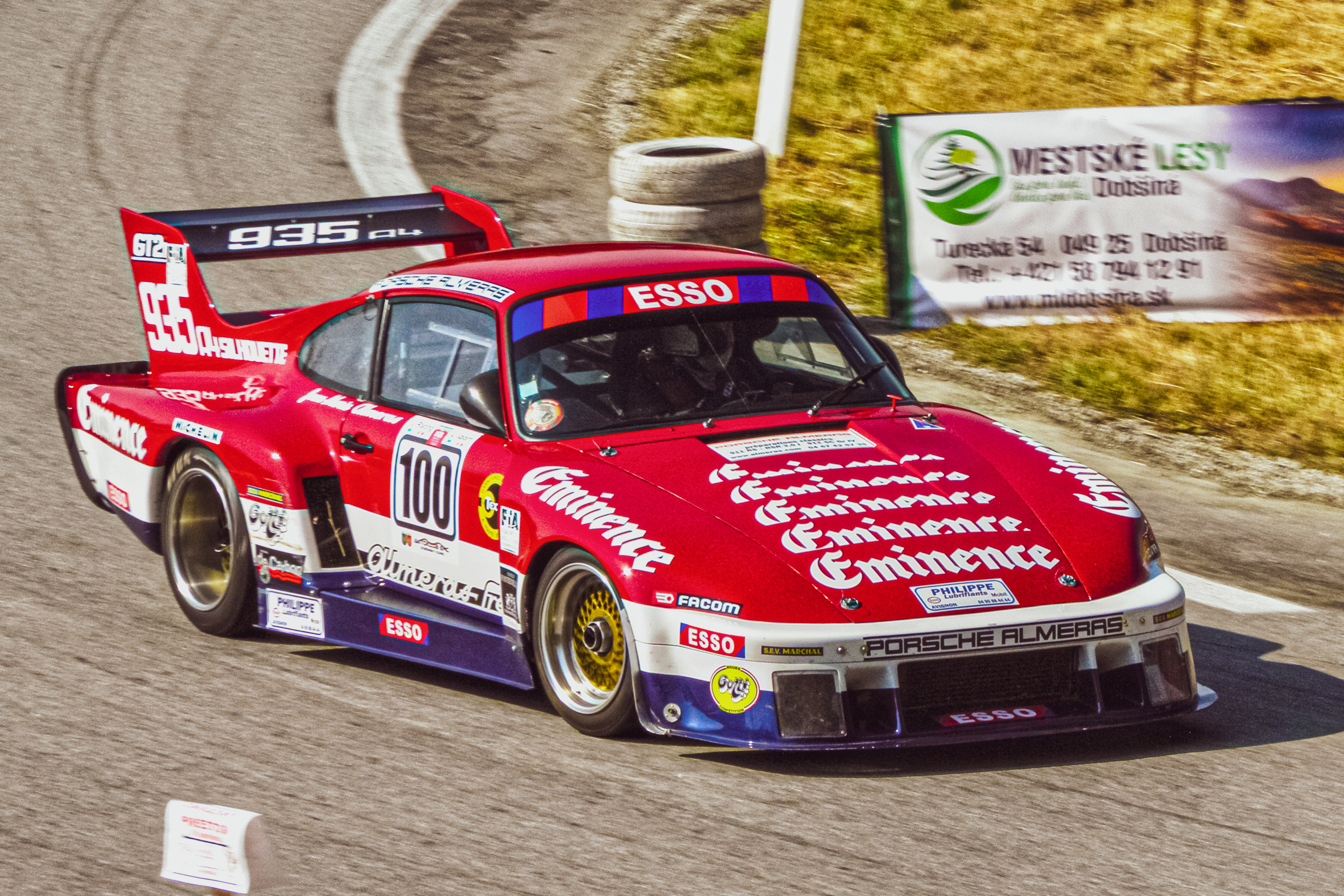
Jean-Marie Alméras 2012

Jean-Marie Alméras (born 13 September 1943 in Montpellier, France) is a French former racing driver and co-founder of Alméras Frères with his brother Jacques Alméras.
