= 1990 24 Hours of Le Mans =

58th 24 Hours of Le Mans endurance race

Previous: 1989	Next: 1991
Index: Races | Winners

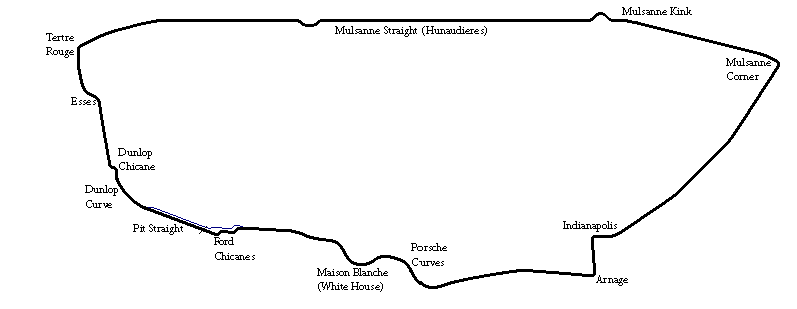
Le Mans in 1990

The 1990 24 Hours of Le Mans was the 58th Grand Prix of Endurance, taking place at the Circuit de la Sarthe, France, on the 16 and 17 June 1990. Due to the ongoing dispute between the ACO and the FISA governing body, the race was not part of the World Sports-Prototype Championship. This was the last Le Mans run under the Group C formula, and a number of manufacturers put in a major effort to win, with the notable exception of defending winners Sauber-Mercedes.

Fitted with a special qualifying engine, Mark Blundell put in a blistering lap to put his Nissan on pole, fully six seconds faster than Oscar Larrauri in the Brun Porsche. Those two cars set the pace in the opening hours. That Porsche was the interloper of an exciting Jaguar versus Nissan battle. The first major incident of the race was in the early evening when the Gianfranco Brancatelli in the race-leading Nissan clipped the Toyota of Aguri Suzuki as they passed by the pits at full speed. The Toyota was wrecked but Suzuki emerged with only some bruising. The only full-course caution was at midnight when another accident sent the Lancia of Fabio Magnani into the trees by the circuit. Again, the driver could walk away. During all this, the Nissan-Jaguar-Brun contest continued unabated through the night.

As Sunday dawned, the Jaguar of Cobb and Nielsen had a 1-lap lead over the IMSA-based Nissan of Brabham/Robinson/Daly. However, at breakfast time, the Nissan challenge faded when Daly brought the car in with a fuel leak. Brundle's car had retired a few hours earlier and he had transferred into the lead car. Meanwhile, the Brun Porsche had stayed in contact and moved up to second. The chase continued all morning, with the Jaguar nursing a damaged gearbox, still just a lap ahead. Then in a cruel twist of luck, with barely a quarter hour to run, the engine broke on the Porsche and it sputtered to a stop at the Mulsanne hairpin. Jaguar inherited a fortuitous 1-2 victory, with Cobb/Nielsen/Brundle heading home previous winners Jan Lammers and Andy Wallace with Franz Konrad. Third was the best of the Porsches, the new Alpha team from Japan, which had one of the few trouble-free races among the finishers.

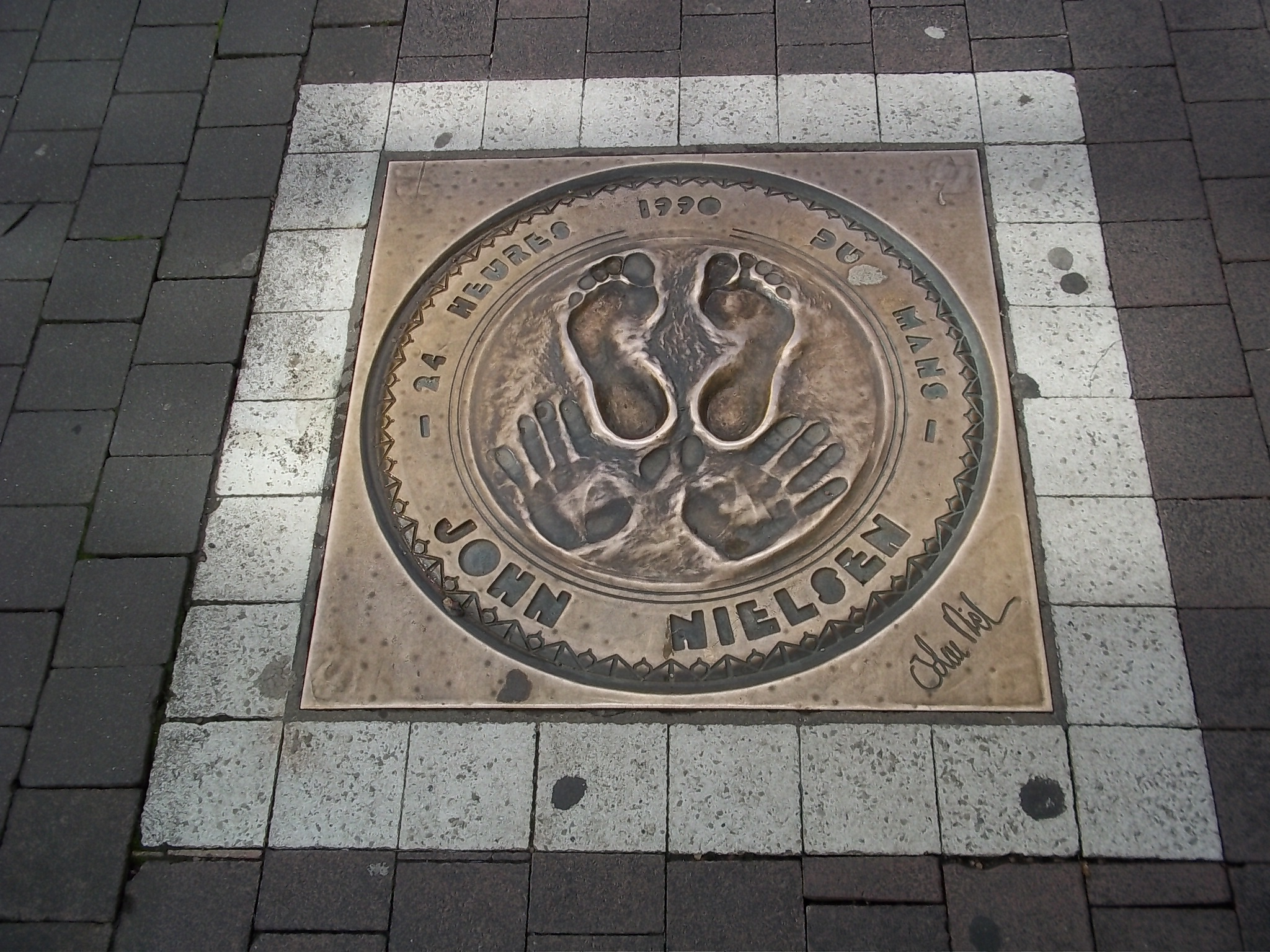
John Nielsen's tile on the Le Mans Walk of Fame

== Regulations ==
This was the second transition year as FISA (Fédération Internationale du Sport Automobile) moved on from Group C to its 3.5-litre formula. These non-turbo engines were intended to be closely aligned to the Formula 1 regulations to encourage "cross-pollination" by engine manufacturers. However, they were by design "sprint" engines unsuited to endurance racing. FISA therefore planned for all races to only be run over 300 miles, with Le Mans to be the sole exception. The ACO (Automobile Club de l'Ouest) had already had intractable disagreements with FISA in 1989 that resulted in Le Mans being thrown out of the World Championship. These arguments carried on throughout the rest of the year, as FISA tried to push to get their timekeeping and media rights imposed across the organising groups. The FIA even briefly threatened to revoke the racing licenses of drivers that ran at Le Mans. The racing license for the Circuit de la Sarthe was due at the end of the year, and FIA/FISA president Jean-Marie Balestre was prepared to use that as leverage with the ACO. Another target was the Ligne Droite des Hunaudières – at 5.7 kilometres, the Hunaudières straight was the longest straight in motorsport, and in the last two years both WM and Sauber-Mercedes cars had famously reached the 400 km/h (248 mph) barrier. In December, Balestre approached the World Motor Sport Council. His proposal was to limit the length of any straight to no more than 2 km (1.2 miles), ostensibly in the interests of safety. It was passed unanimously, coming into effect from 1990. The ruling decreed no circuit licensed by FISA may have a straight longer than 2 km. The ACO unsuccessfully appealed to the French courts and were therefore obliged to buy land and install two, roughly equidistant, chicanes along the Hunaudières straight to make it comply to the new decree. In total, they added 65 metres to the lap distance – taking it to 13.600 km (8.45 miles). Works were also done to create a new, twisty, pit-entry road designed to dramatically slow the cars down coming into the crowded pit-lane. As the works were completed in February, after the FISA deadline had lapsed, the Le Mans 24-hours would again be excluded from the World Championship. Nissan management believed the chicanes would slow lap-times by about 20 seconds, or 10%, and the overall distance covered by a similar amount, however they thought fuel consumption would stay about the same.

This had a follow-on effect on the car regulations. Manufacturers and teams knew as the season started that Le Mans would not be included and could plan accordingly. Likewise, the ACO was no longer bound by the official rules that heavily penalised the Group C cars with a minimum weight of 1000 kg. They retained the 900 kg for Group C, against the 750 kg minimum of the 3.5-litre 'atmos'. The latter had no fuel restriction; however, the Group C were still limited to 2550 litres. The C2 class had been abolished in the new championship, but the ACO opened up entries to the class, keeping the 750 kg / 1815-litre restrictions of the previous year. The GTP class had the same fuel allowance as Group C but used the IMSA sliding-scale, weight-to-engine-size chart.

Qualifying was again on Wednesday and Thursday, with 2½ hours daylight and 2 hours night running each day. All drivers had to do a lap-time within 120% of the average of the fastest three cars, as well as doing at least three laps at night. Times done in a team's Test-car would now also be officially accepted, which would allow teams to wind up the turbos on "disposable" engines for one-off high-power qualifying laps. During the race, night was defined as between the hours of 9pm and 4.30am. Drivers were only allowed to drive a maximum of 14 hours total, with no stint lasting longer than 4 hours and a minimum 60-minute stand-down between shifts. They could switch between cars of the same team but only three drivers were allowed per car.

Pit rules were stipulated as follows:
- There was an 80 km/h (50 mph) speed limit in the pit-lane;
- A maximum of four pit-crew could work on a car at a time;
- Engines had to be switched off during refuelling, and wheel changes only happened after the refuelling was completed
To be qualified as a finisher, a car had to pass the chequered flag under its own power, and complete a total distance of at least 70% of the winner.

== Entries ==
Even though this was a phase-out, interim season, a top-quality field of Group C presented their entries to the ACO. There were 41 cars at scrutineering, including a massive 20 Porsches. Works teams came from Jaguar, Porsche, Nissan, Toyota and Mazda. However, the big news was that Sauber-Mercedes would not return to defend their victory, as it was a non-Championship round. There were only three cars entered for the upcoming FIA 3.5-litre class. Once again, the C2 class was dominated by Spice with 6 of 11 entries. This year there was a significant Japanese presence. There were 19 cars made in Japan; and along with the three works teams, there were seven teams from their national championship and 15 drivers from that country.

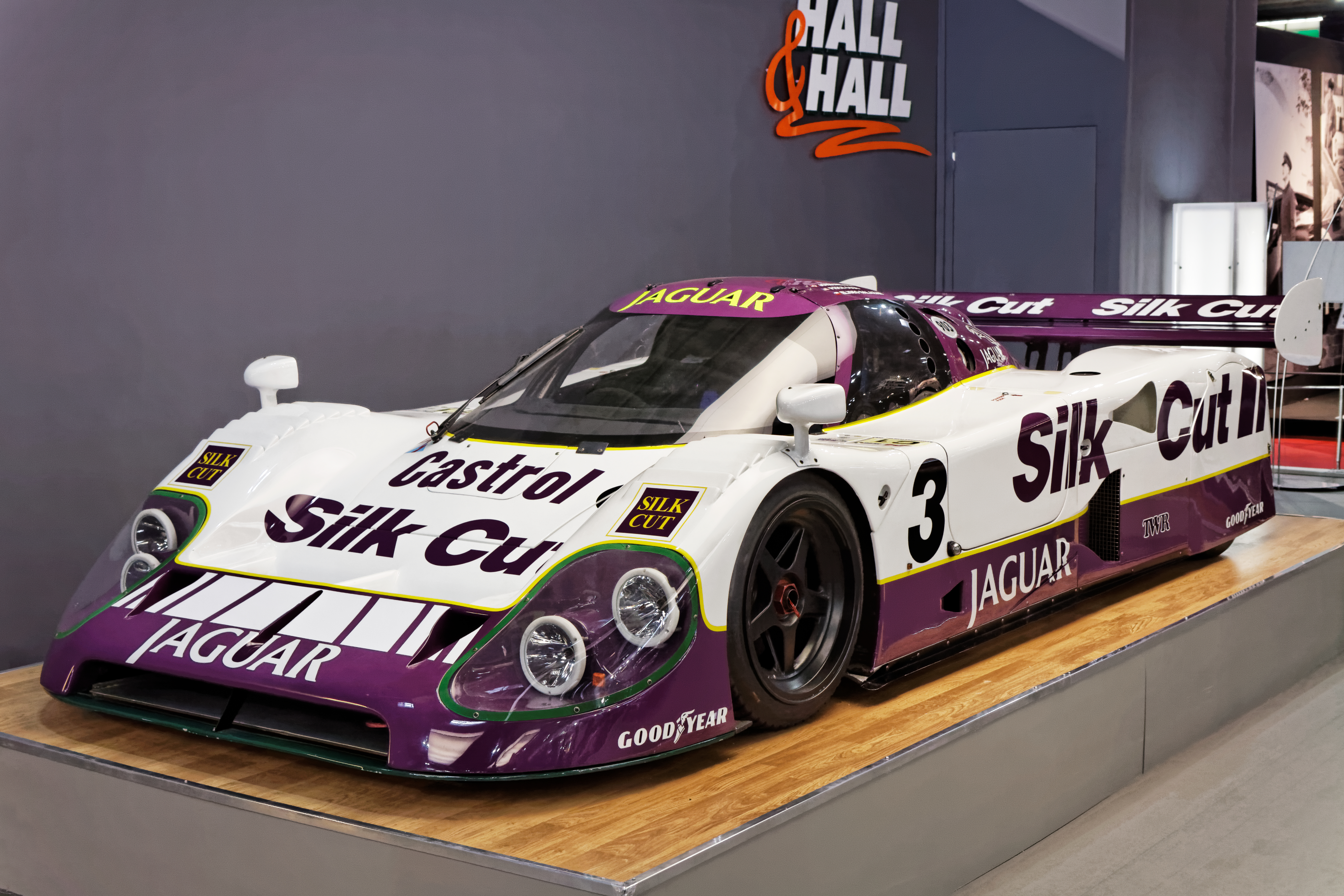
Jaguar XJR-12

Class	Quantity	Turbo+Rotary engines
Group C1	42 / 34	34 / 29
IMSA-GTP	4 / 4	4 / 4
Group C2	11 / 10	1 / 1
Total Entries	57 / 48	39 / 34

- Note: The first number is the number accepted, the second the number who started.

=== Group C1 ===
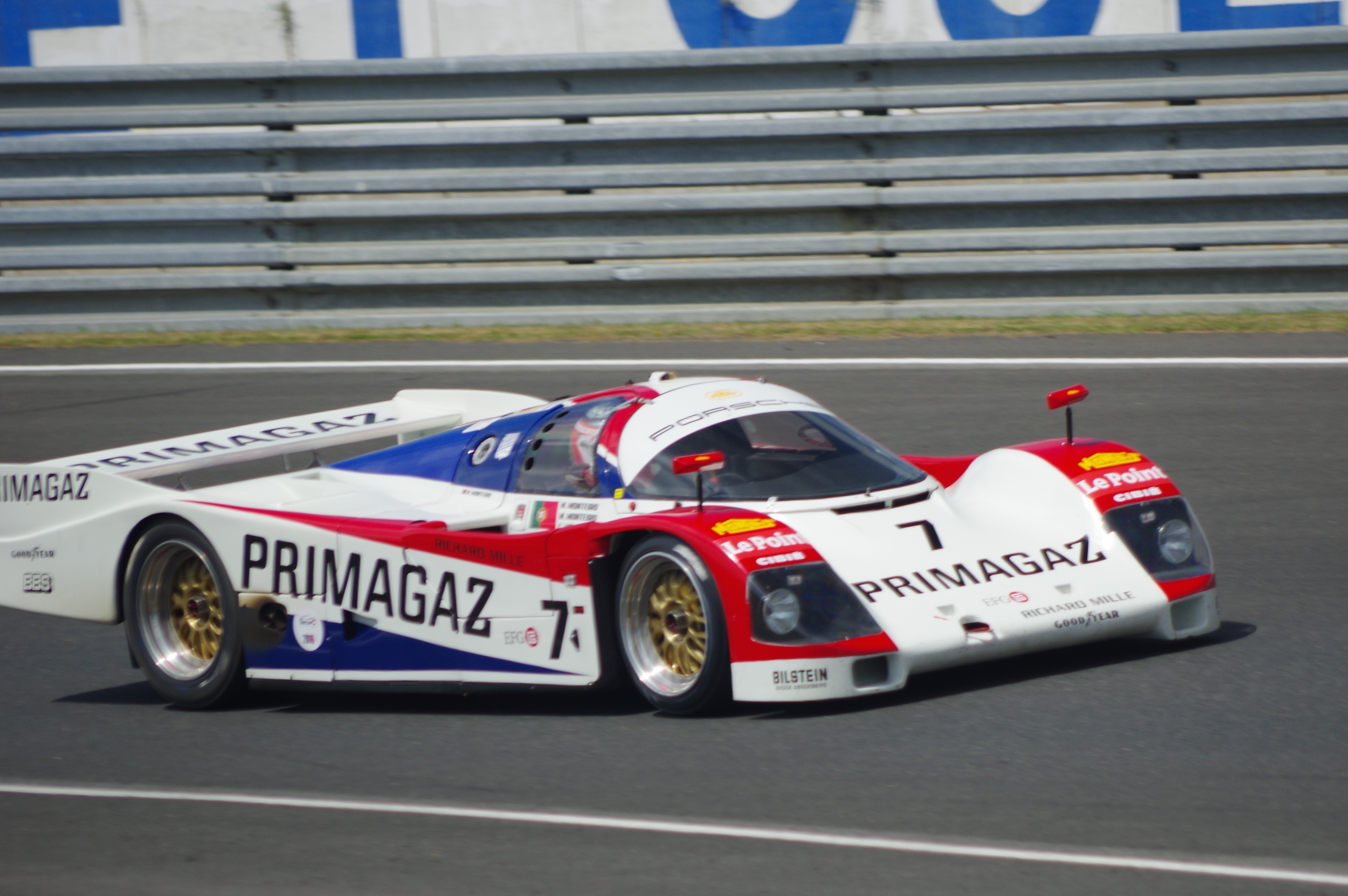
Obermaier Motorsport Porsche 962

In the absence of Sauber-Mercedes-Benz, the Jaguar team were now the favourites for outright victory. The two manufacturers were hotly contesting the World Championship, but for this race Tom Walkinshaw Racing would not run the turbo XJR-11 sprint-car. Instead, they chose the XJR-12 being run successfully in the IMSA endurance series, including two brand-new chassis. TWR's engine-specialist, Allan Scott kept developing the 24-valve V12 and fitted the March IndyCar gearbox. Switching from Dunlop to bigger Goodyear tyres meant a redesign of the suspension and rear bodywork. Extensive wind-tunnel testing tweaked the chassis to generate 60% more downforce for only 20% more drag. The team was also confident that the faulty oil-seals that caused the transmission failures last year have been sorted out. The 1988 race-winners, Jan Lammers and Andy Wallace, were paired in the championship season and at the start of the year had won the Daytona 24-hours with American Davy Jones, here, they were joined by Austrian Franz Konrad (who had been running his own car in the championship this season). The other championship pairing of Martin Brundle and Alain Ferté had David Leslie as their third driver. IMSA team-mates John Nielsen and Price Cobb ran the third car; and Ferté's brother, Michel was in the fourth car with Jones and Spaniard Luis Pérez-Sala.

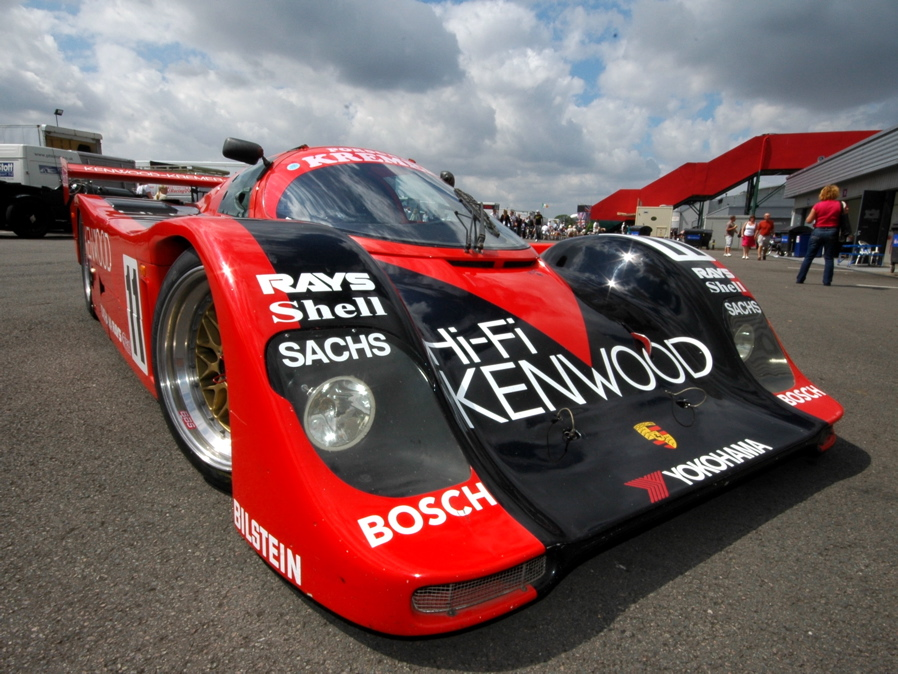
Kremer Racing 962C-K6

In Mercedes-Benz's absence, Porsche fancied their chances for more Le Mans success. Having suspended their own works team now, the factory threw its weight behind the team of Reinhold Joest, who had taken a well-earned victory the previous year against the big works teams, and had a strong Le Mans pedigree. Technical Director Norbert Singer and his engineers worked with Joest Racing to do further development of the 962C, now in its ninth season. Four new aluminium monocoque chassis were built, fitting them with langheck tails that gave 10% more downforce, better fuel economy and greater straight-line speed – now up to 365 kp/h (225 mph).

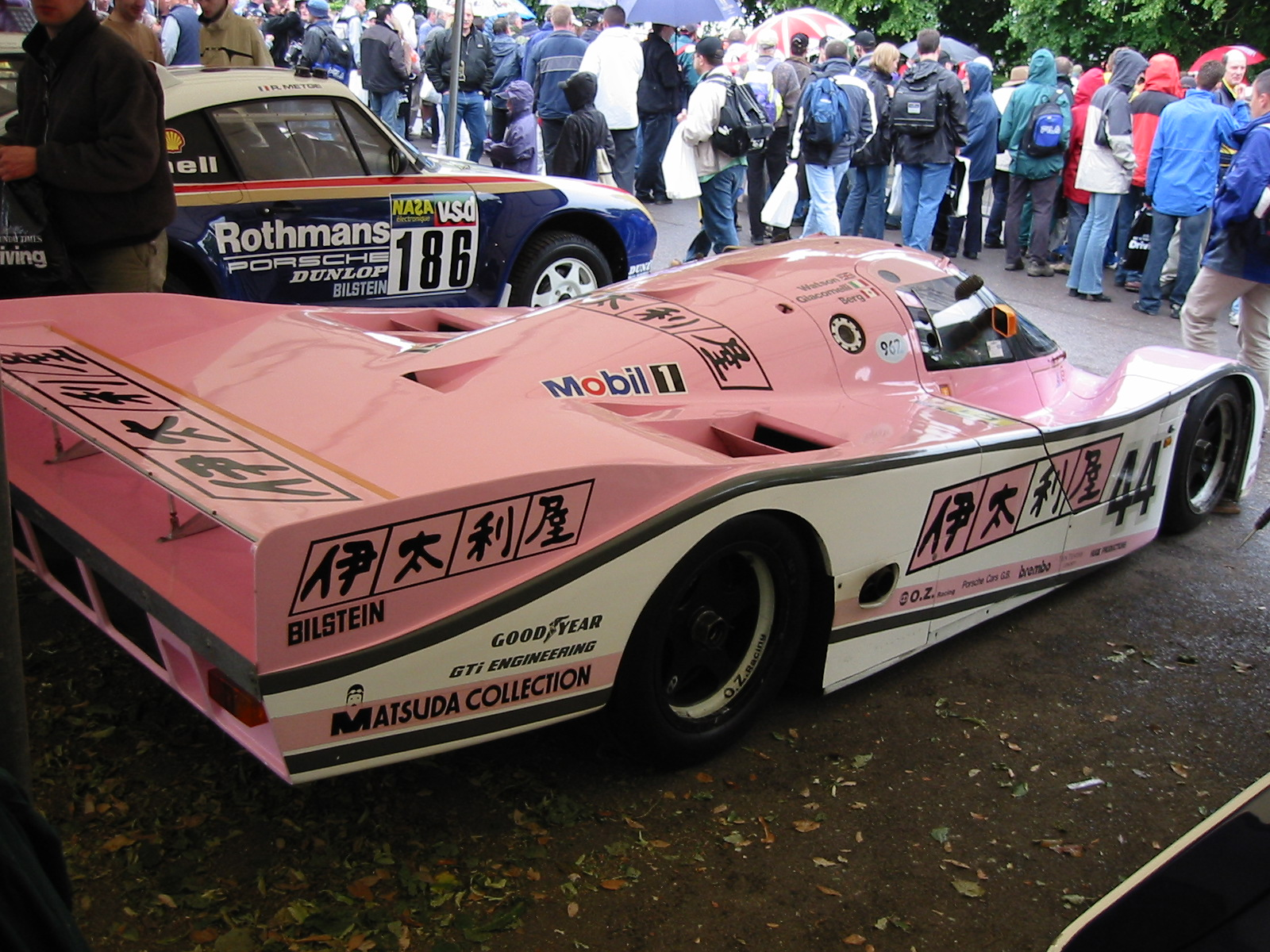
RLR's standard 962C

All four cars came to Le Mans, with a strong driver line-up: 5-time winner Derek Bell was with Hans-Joachim Stuck and Frank Jelinski; Porsche veteran Bob Wollek drove with Formula 1 drivers Jonathon Palmer and Philippe Alliot while the third car had Brit Will Hoy, Swede Stanley Dickens and German "John Winter" (Louis Krages. A "satellite" entry ran the 4th car, with Henri Pescarolo had Jacques Laffite and Jean-Louis Ricci. Ricci was heir to the Nina Ricci fashion house. As he told L'Équipe, Joest charged him £90000 for the seat, a quarter of which was covered by his Primagaz sponsorship. Immensely experienced, between them these 12 drivers had 108 Le Mans starts and 13 victories.

Despite the car's age, another 16 Porsche 962s were in the C1 class, dominating its entry-list. The Cologne-based Kremer brothers had been long-time Porsche stalwarts and taken to doing their own major modifications to the base Porsche models. The honeycomb/carbon K6 was their variant on the Porsche 962. The lead car would be driven by Sarel van der Merwe/Kunimitsu Takahashi/Hideki Okada while the second had gentleman-driver (and prime sponsor) Thierry Salvador with Bernard de Dryver and Patrick Gonin. Another team to modify the Porsche 962 was Richard Lloyd Racing. Nigel Stroud's 962 GTi had a honeycomb-monocoque and covered rear-wheel fairings to improve aerodynamics. Two cars were entered, though only one arrived. The team also sported a regular 962C – their first Porsche-purchase in six years. With both decked out in the hot-pink and white livery of their Italya Sports sponsor, the GTi would be driven by last year's winner (for Sauber) Manuel Reuter, James Weaver and JJ Lehto. The other car had John Watson, Bruno Giacomelli and Allen Berg. Walter Brun soldiered on with his uncompetitive EuroBrun team in Formula 1. The drain on finances meant downsizing his championship team to just the two cars – both of which came to Le Mans. They used 1989 chassis with 760 bhp 3.0-litre engines; with a special 3.2-litre engine prepared for qualifying by race engineer Rudi Walch capable of 900 bhp. The lead car, with Brun, his F1 driver Oscar Larrauri and Jésus Pareja, was an aluminium monocoque, while the other was a carbon-honeycomb monocoque. Like Kremer and Alpha, they were running new Yokohama radial tyres for the first time. The company's technicians recommended the teams run the short-tail configuration to keep the maximum speed down and protect the tyres. Alpha Racing was a new Japanese team, running in the JSPC championship with Derek Bell and Tiff Needell as its drivers. With Bell seconded to Joest for this race, Needell was joined by fellow-Britons David Sears and Anthony Reid. Trust Racing Team was another debutante Japanese team, but a front-runner in the JSPC. Previously running an ex-RLR 962 GTi, they arrived with a brand new long-tail 962C for drivers George Fouché/Steven Andskär/Shunji Kasuya. Another regular in the JSPC was the team of Australian Le Mans winner Vern Schuppan. Setting up a base in England, he engaged his co-founder of Tiga Race Cars, Howden Ganley, and former JWA team manager John Horsman. His two cars came to Le Mans, with the lead car driven by veteran Hurley Haywood/Wayne Taylor/Rickard Rydell.

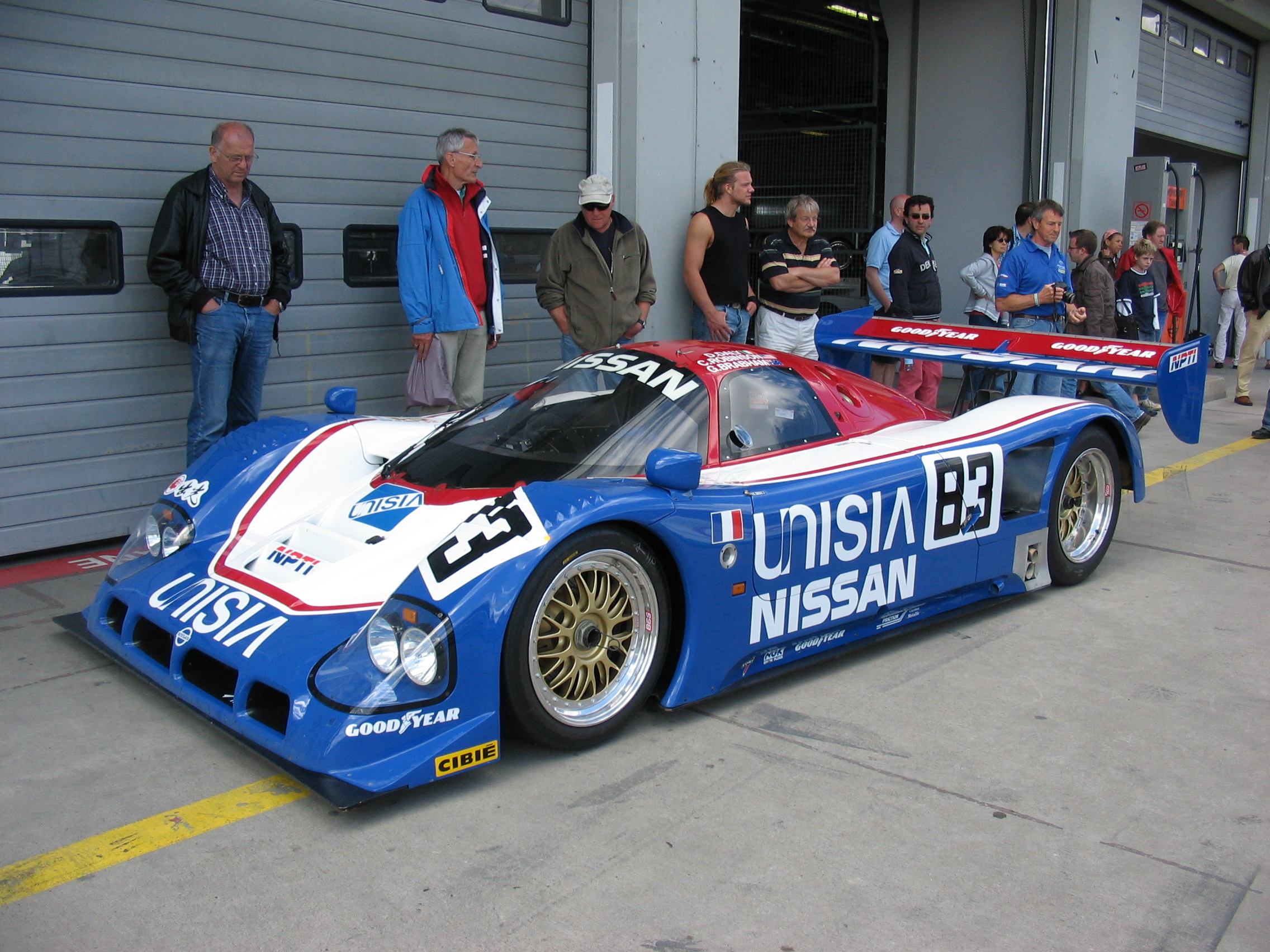
Nissan R90CK

Le Mans resident Yves Courage now had public funding from the local Département de la Sarthe in his ongoing effort to emulate his friend Jean Rondeau, and to win Le Mans in a car of his own manufacture. The C22 was updated with a shortened nose and lengthened tale to improve the aero balance. Called the C24S, a second, brand-new, chassis was also built. It ran with a fully water-cooled Porsche engine. After engine failures in the championship, the older car ran an older, but more reliable, mixed air/water-cooled version. This, in turn, necessitated further air ducts and relocating the turbos and intercoolers which added 17 kg weight. The team also had a pair of the entered for a solid 4-car attempt.

After years of development, the Japanese teams were now a major force in international sports-car racing. The Nissan Motorsports division (NISMO) had three subsidiaries – in the USA, Europe, and Japan – for the respective regional championships. In the IMSA series, Geoff Brabham had the measure of Jaguar and Porsche, and had won the Drivers' Championship for the past two seasons. The Lola chassis was designed around the 800 bhp Nissan 3.5-litre VRH35 engine, boosted by two IHI turbos. The 1990 model, the R90CK, had a narrower transmission, allowing wider air tunnels along the sides for better downforce, along with further aerodynamic refinements. Nissan Japan had their own variant, the R90CP, with a re-profiled nose and undertray. Nine Nissans came to Le Mans, including test cars, and riding on the back of some good results this season to date. In IMSA, Nissan had won 5 of the 8 rounds to date and three of those four IMSA drivers were teamed up in one car (Brabham/Chip Robinson/Derek Daly) while Sebring-winner Bob Earl, teamed up with Kiwi Steve Millen and Irishman Michael Roe. In the World Championship, the team had achieved two third places. The two cars from the European team had Kenny Acheson/ Martin Donnelly/Olivier Grouillard and Julian Bailey/Mark Blundell/Gianfranco Brancatelli. The fifth entry was the Japanese R90CP, with the same crew as last year: Kazuyoshi Hoshino/Toshio Suzuki/Masahiro Hasemi. The works teams were also bolstered by a trio of privateer ex-works Nissan R89C cars – Courage Compétition entered two (one arrived) and Team Le Mans bought over their JSPC-car.

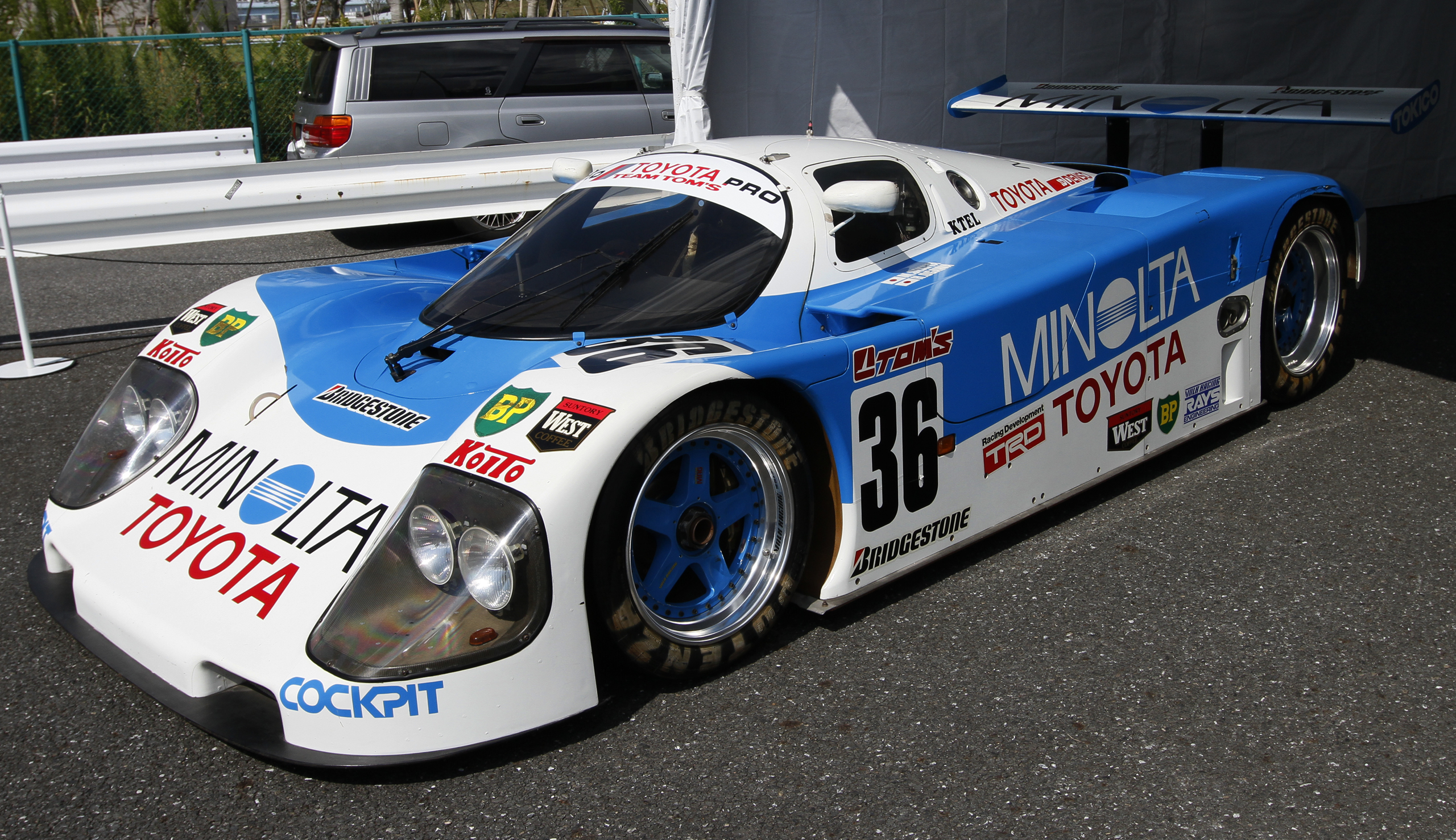
Toyota 90C-V

Like Nissan, Toyota mounted a serious assault on Le Mans this year, with three racing and two test cars arriving. The R32 V8 turbo engine had been refined over the close-season and although running a 3.6-litre version in the WSC sprint races, the team chose to run with the more fuel-efficient 3.2-litre version for Le Mans. The 90C-V now had a 6-speed gearbox as part of the new rear-end set-up. Using wind-tunnel testing for the first time, Toyota claimed the improved aerodynamics increased downforce by 20%. Results were promising, winning on debut at Fuji Speedway in the Japanese championship and an IMSA victory in May with Dan Gurney's All American Racers team (who raced it as the Eagle HF89). Fuji winners Hitoshi Ogawa and Masanori Sekiya ran the first car, with team–driver Geoff Lees, and the second car had the other WSC team drivers, Aguri Suzuki and Johnny Dumfries with World and European Touring-car champion Roberto Ravaglia as their third driver. The third car was operated by Shin Kato's SARD team, returning for the first time since 1978, this time with full works support. Team drivers were Pierre-Henri Raphanel/Roland Ratzenberger/Naoki Nagasaka under the eye of veteran manager Keith Greene. In 1989, Italian Gianni Mussato had purchased two ex-works Lancia LC2 chassis and parts. He had failed to qualify at Le Mans that year due to a turbo fire, but returned again for their only race of the season. Fitted with an Abarth transmission and twin KKK (Kühnle, Kopp & Kausch) turbos, the Ferrari 3050cc V8 engine could put out up to 800 bhp.

Spice Engineering was in its second season with their entry in the 3.5-litre Group C class. This year they contested with two cars, and sold two more for customers. The Cosworth DFR was race-prepared by John Nicholson, with the bodywork fine-tuned by Spice's Graham Humphrys and Dave Kelly. One car was entered for Le Mans, with their regular drivers Tim Harvey and Fermín Vélez, along with Chris Hodgetts. Both privateers arrived as well: Dave Prewitt's GP Motorsport had previously entered the C2 class, but now stepped up to the premier class. Dutchman Charles Zwolsman was a convicted drug-smuggler recently out on parole. Having bought the new Spice, he decided against running it in C1 and instead fitted it with a Cosworth DFL bored out to 3955cc, to race in the C2 class with Hugh Chamberlain. A new entrant in the 3.5-litre class came from the Norma M6. This was a project from the small French sports-car manufacturer Norma Auto Concept and co-financed by Noël del Bello, who had previously raced at Le Mans in his privateer Sauber. The car was built around a unique new W12 engine design by Guy Nègre, who had previously worked at the Renault Sport F1 engineer-team. The complex design had the power of a V12 but was more compact, with three cylinder banks in a twin 60° V-layout. The engine had been tested in an AGS Formula 1 car in 1989, but never taken racing. It was entered by the ASA Armagnac Bigorre, the local car-racing association for the Norma team in southern France, and driven by Del Bello, Daniel Boccard and Norma co-founder Norbert Santos.

=== Group C2 ===
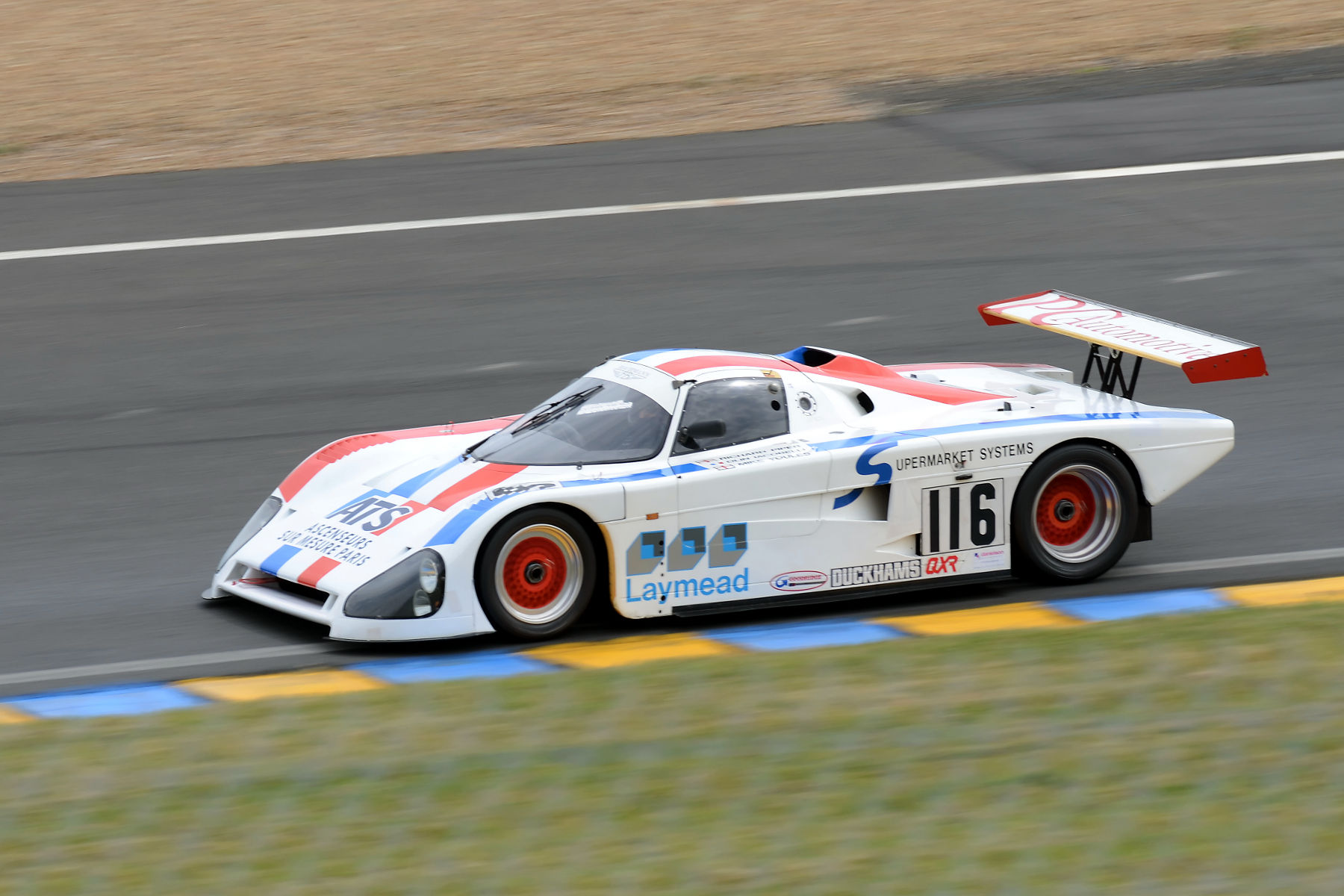
Spice SE89C of PC Automotive

This was to be the final running of the C2 class at Le Mans, with 11 cars entered. Once again, it was dominated by various iterations of the successful Spice design. As mentioned above, Chamberlain Engineering had the new SE90C. There were two of last year's SE89Cs from Graff Racing and Richard Piper's PC Automotive. Team Mako had their ex-works championship-winning SE88C, while Swiss Pierre-Alain Lombardi now had an SE87C. As well as their C1 Spice, GP Motorsport operated Dudley Wood's SE87C alongside an upgraded GC286 from the now-defunct Tiga company. Both were fitted with the enlarged 460 bhp 3.9-litre DFL engine.

French driving-school director, Philippe Farjon, had won the class last year with Courage Compétition in his Cougar C20LM. He returned to defend his title with Jean Massaoudi as his co-driver. However, with the only turbo in the class (a 2.8-litre Porsche) it would have a tough assignment, being over 100 kg heavier than any other car in the class. Parisian driver-constructor Louis Descartes brought his C289 back to the C2 class. This had been his first modern carbon-fibre, honeycomb monocoque. In the World Championship, he was running it as an entrant in the new 3.5-litre formula. Fitted with a 3.3-litre Cosworth DFL engine though, it was badly underpowered and out of its depth. Back in familiar territory in C2, it got a new brake set-up, cooling system and bodywork. Descartes stepped aside from the driving this year, with his lead driver being French rally- and sports-car veteran François Migault with Gérard Tremblay and Jacques Heuclin brought in as co-drivers. ADA Engineering had been running their ADA 02B well in the British C2 series. Fitted with a Nicholson-Cosworth DFL, it had received refinements to its undertray and suspension to improve airflow. Owner-driver Ian Harrower had John Sheldon and Jerry Mahony with him.

=== IMSA-GTP ===
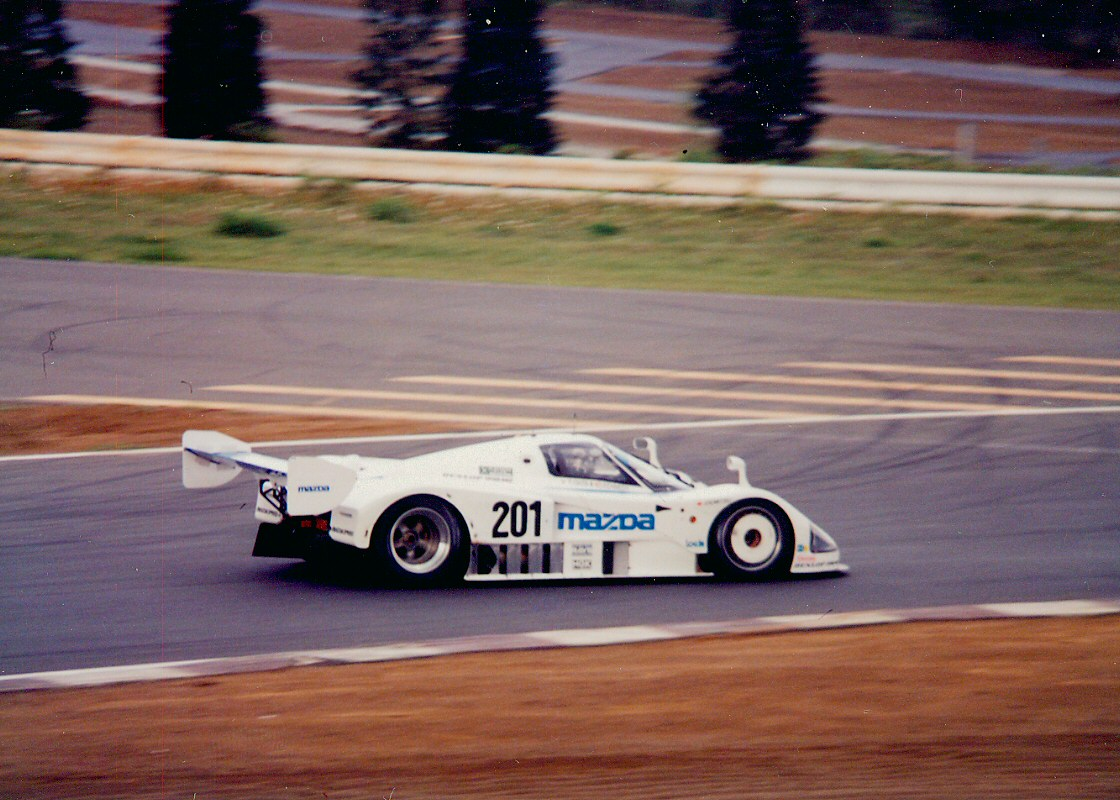
Mazda 787

The clock was ticking for Mazdaspeed as rotaries would be banned when the 3.5-formula came into force in 1992. They had been entering their rotary-engined cars at Le Mans every year since 1980. The latest development from Nigel Stroud was the Mazda 787, built around the R26B rotary engine. This was a completely new quad-rotary engine was a more compact and fuel-efficient design than the 13J it replaced. Now fitted with 3 sparkplugs per rotor, it could put out 700 bhp through its Porsche gearbox. The carbon/kevlar chassis were built by Advanced Composites in the UK and shipped to Japan for aerodynamic modification. Two 787s were ready for Le Mans. Team manager Alan Docking had 6-time winner Jacky Ickx alongside him as a consultant. The team had a very stable driver line-up: Stefan Johansson/David Kennedy/Pierre Dieudonné in one, while Volker Weidler was this year teamed up with Formula 1 drivers Johnny Herbert and Bertrand Gachot. They were supported by one of last year's 767B models with the Japanese crew of Yojiro Terada/Takashi Yorino/Yoshimi Katayama.

However, this year, Mazda had a challenger in the GTP class. Italian gentleman-racer Gianpiero Moretti had made his money through his automotive accessories company, MOMO Srl. A regular presence in the American IMSA series, he brought over his Porsche 962 that was set up to the IMSA specs. In 1989, he had embarked on a partnership with German C2 car-designer Gebhardt Motorsport. Their first car, based on an ex-Brun monocoque, was wrecked at Daytona when a tyre blow-out flipped Derek Bell onto his roof. A new tub was built in Florida and fitted with a chassis designed by Gebhardt and called the Porsche 962 GS. After a shakedown race in the US, the team came to France. Fritz Gebhardt was team manager, while his brother Günther joined Moretti and Nick Adams as the drivers.

The only American entry this year was an unusual 3-year old Chevrolet Corvette GTP. Originally built by Lola Cars, it had run in 1988 in the IMSA series with Peerless Racing. When General Motors closed the project, Peerless soon on-sold the car to Dennis Kazmerowski. Together with Californian Paul Canary, and Joe Schukert's Eagle Engine company, they set up Eagle Performance Racing. The team wanted to tackle Le Mans with outright power, despite the neutering of the long Hunaudières straight. To that end, they fitted the car with a nominal 10.2-litre Chevrolet "big-block" 32-valve V8 engine – used in drag racing and powerboat racing and rated at 900 bhp. It was unusual in that it allowed interchanging of different-sized crankshafts during a pitstop. This meant that the displacement could be varied from 9.6 to an enormous 11.5 litres. Christened the Eagle 700, Canary and Kazmerowski were joined by Dave Vegher as the driver line-up.

== Practice and Qualifying ==
Wednesday practice was only 90 minutes old when there was a major accident. A suspension bolt on the rear of the Joest Porsche of Jonathan Palmer broke and the car had suddenly veered left at 320 kp/h (200 mph) along the back straight between the chicanes, slamming into the barrier. It immediately flicked round, got airborne for 100 metres, before landing and hitting the opposite barrier and finally came to rest at the entrance to the second chicane. Incredibly, Palmer was able to get out and walk away with just a broken thumb. The car though was a complete write-off, and the session was red-flagged while the barriers were repaired. The other two Joest cars were parked, putting a halt to their attempts to claim pole. It was Nissan that set the pace on the first day, with Brabham setting the fastest time – with a 3:33.3 done at 10.30pm at night – and Blundell second. On the second day, the Brun team gave Larrauri their T-car with the 3.2-litre engine. The short-tail Porsche lost out on top-line speed but was very nimble through the corners. He threw down the gauntlet first, with a 3:33.1 lap to go to the top of the list. Brun was thrilled to put one over the works-Porsches, vindicated for his bodyshell choice. (Brun had run a longtail version as well, and found it 4 seconds slower) Nissan also fitted a special qualifying engine to Blundell's car and thanks to a fortuitous engine fault, the turbo wastegates stuck closed, sending the engine up to over 1100 bhp (to date, still a power record at Le Mans). Still managing 380 kp/h (237 mph) on the abbreviated Hunaudières straight, and with almost a completely clear track he put in a blistering lap of 3:27.0, fully 6 seconds faster than Larrauri that stunned the pitlane. It was the first Le Mans pole for a Japanese car and, proving a point, the Nissans of Hoshino, Brabham and Acheson filled the next three spots behind Larrauri with Stuck in the Joest Porsche grabbing 6th (3:36.1). Without the benefit of augmented turbo-power, Jaguar did not try to contest the pole time but were still quick enough to take the next 3 spots, with Geoff Lees putting the best of the Toyotas in 10th (3:37.1). Next was the best of the other non-works Porsches was George Fouché for the new Trust Racing Team. The Mazdaspeed team was very satisfied with their new cars, qualifying 22nd (3:43.0) and 23rd,. They were lapping almost 6 seconds faster than the 767B, (itself only one place, and half a second, further up the grid than their Momo Porsche rival in 35th). Quickest in the C2 class was the Team Mako Spice, qualifying 36th with a 3:50.7 lap from Stirling, almost 7 seconds faster than the Lombardi and Graff Spices.

Non-qualifiers included the GP Motorsport Group C Spice, that blew both its engines in practice. The Argo also missed the cut – although Ian Khan was quick, his two co-drivers were 20 seconds slower and pulled their average time down. The giant Corvette-Eagle completed only three flying laps over the two days suffering overheating and a broken alternator. The overly-complex Norma never even got on the track, and was never seen at a circuit again. It was soon apparent that the new surface at the chicanes was not as smooth as the rest of the circuit, with a number of drivers being caught out under braking, particularly at the first chicane. Twice, Jaguar cars had their electrics shaken up so much that the cars stopped out on the circuit in practice. The Joest team suspected Palmer's big accident had been caused by a puncture caused by gravel on the track at the chicane. They also were finding the new Michelin tyres were not compatible with the aero package. Bob Wollek was put into the second Joest car, bumping Will Hoy out. Palmer took up commentary duties on the British TV coverage, while Philippe Alliot moved over to the Kremer team. The short-tail Porsches had shown that outright speed was not such a major factor now. The big unknown to the teams would be the additional wear on the gearboxes and brakes with the introduction of the two hard downshifting zones approaching the chicanes. A conflicting DTM race in Germany meant Stuck, Laffite (both Joest) and Alain Cudini (Courage Nissan) were "double-booked" and would miss the start of the race as they caught a private plane back to Le Mans in the evening.

== Race ==
=== Start ===
Saturday was the hottest day of the race-week. The drama started even before Le Tricolore fell. Acheson's Nissan parked up at the end of the formation lap after losing his brakes and busting the transmission trying to stop - a carry-over of problems found in the morning warm-up. Immediately, Bailey and Larrauri set the pace and within 3 laps they were already 10 seconds ahead of Hasemi in the other works Nissan, with the four Jaguars in hot pursuit. The langheck Porsches were proving a real handful for the Joest team and Wollek pitted on lap 6 to get the amount of rear wing increased, while Jelinski soldiered on, but slipping down the order. When Stuck, just back at the circuit, got in the car for his first stint at 5.40pm, he found the team down in 14th.

Larrauri had moved into the lead on lap 4, which he held through to the fuel stops. In the second hour, as the Brun team's non-professional drivers took over, Blundell was able to get the Nissan back to the front. At dinner-time, approaching the 3rd stops, Bailey had a solid gap over Alain Ferté (Jaguar), Daly (Nissan), Cobb & Wallace (Jaguars) and Brun (Porsche). Michel Ferté was 7th in the other Jaguar ahead of the Japanese Nissan, Haywood in the Schuppan Porsche with Needell rounding out the top-10 in the Alpha Porsche. That soon became ninth when Haywood ran himself out of fuel going a lap too long. It was apparent the Porsches were going to be hard on their brakes, particularly for the Joest team who were all languishing outside the top-10. In the next round of driver-changes, Larrauri got back in the Brun Porsche and was immediately lapping 6–7 seconds faster than his teammates, and closing in on Leslie doing his first stint in the Jaguar. Brancatelli took over the leading Nissan at 7.45pm and kept pushing the car hard. However, at 8:20pm just starting the 67th lap, he clipped the Toyota of Aguri Suzuki as they went into Dunlop Curve. The Toyota slammed backwards into the outside barriers, wrecking the car although a dazed Suzuki was able to walk away. The Nissan, escaping with just a puncture, was able to limp around to the pits for repairs. The Toyota had bent a good portion of the Armco barrier, pushing it back two metres, which would take a while to repair, yet incredibly the stewards chose not to deploy the pace cars. For 90 minutes the marshals wearily waved their yellow flags, yet the drivers got more blasé and were soon passing by the safety-workers barely lifting off through the corner.

When one Nissan stumbled, another stepped up – the IMSA team of Brabham/Daly/Robinson moved into the lead with the Brundle and Jones Jaguars close behind. However, as night was falling, the Jaguars were delayed by a water leak and a brake change respectively. But when Robinson was himself delayed with a pad change, they lost a lap to the Ferté brothers in the other Jaguars. In C2, the pole-sitting Mako Spice had fuel-vaporisation problems almost straight away, and fell to the back of the field, with the ALD and Tiga. The pace was set initially by the Graff and Lombardi Spices. However, when they were both suffered long delays around 10.30pm (for gearbox and electrics respectively) it was the Spice of PC Automotive that moved up to lead.

=== Night ===
Surprisingly, after six hours, there had still only been two retirements. However, as night fell problems began to hit the Jaguar team. Alain made several stops losing water, costing 8 minutes. Shortly before midnight, Jones had to drop his lap-times with a sticking throttle. The in-car TV camera gear prevented the mechanics getting a close look, so he had to go for another careful stint. Only after a further stop could it be fixed, losing a lap and dropping them to 12th. At 12.45am, the race went under full-course yellow after a major accident: Sekiya's Toyota had clipped the Lancia of Magnani while lapping it on the very fast approach to Indianapolis. It sent the Lancia over the barriers at almost 300 kp/h (180 mph), and out into the trees beyond. Magnani scrambled out with only slight injuries before the ruptured fuel tank exploded. Although it started a small fire in the woods, the destroyed Lancia was well off the track and the pace cars were only deployed for fifteen minutes. By 1am, after nine hours, Brabham led Larrauri, Nielsen and Lammers all still on the lead lap. The NISMO Nissan was the first car off the lead lap, in sixth, with the Stuck/Bell/Jelinski Joest and Alpha Porsches close behind. The cooler circuit was proving far better for the Porsches and their tyres, and their pace quickly improved.

In the early hours of the morning, it was the turn of the Nissan team to strike trouble. Brancatelli had been having gearbox issues, stopping at Indianapolis with a broken gear-link while 6th. He limped back to the pits but an hour later when Bailey tried to leave his pits, the rear wheels locked up. Taking another 17 minutes to repair, he fell to 16th place, only to stop out on the circuit soon after. Pitcrew travelled to him and tried giving repair instructions but to no avail – the gearbox was broken and the battery flat. At 2:15, the IMSA Nissan, back in the lead, came in for its own scheduled brake-change which put it back in the clutches of its IMSA rival, the Nielsen/Cobb Jaguar, and for the rest of the night they duelled back and forth. Third at the halfway mark was the Lammers Jaguar, with the Brun Porsche staying in touch in 4th. However, Larrauri was starting to feel ill, possibly as a result of a start-line shunt in a Renault support race on Saturday. Driving duties would have to be carried by Brun and Pareja through the night and to their credit, they kept up the pace. The fastest drivers through the night were Brundle and Ferté, doing 3:41s in their Jaguar recovering from its earlier delay, moving back up the field. Coming up to 5am, Jaguar had more problems. Michel Ferté came in needing a new splitter and nose section, losing 2 laps. Soon after, Konrad brought his car in, after missing his braking at the first chicane and sliding into the tyre barrier – which warranted a new nose section, door, and windscreen. The GTP class had already been a race of attrition. The fancied Mazda 787s had been delayed at the start of the race and it was the older car that led the class initially. Dieudonné briefly led the class in the early evening, until two seized wheel hubs and then engine failure ended their race at half-time. The other 787 had a miserable race with early fuel-feed problems leaving them marooned with the backmarkers until electrical failure in the middle of the night left them without lights and fried wiring. The Momo Porsche had been keeping up with the Mazdas and when they faltered. It picked up the lead going into the night and held it for six hours, until a broken transmission stopped it at 2am. So that left the third Mazda as the sole survivor, just having to keep going to the finish for a class win.

=== Morning ===
As dawn was breaking, the pit was lit up by James Weaver bringing his RLR Porsche in. The rear end was on fire after a puncture on the Mulsanne Straight had ripped off a turbo pipe. The damage was terminal. At 6am, Brabham brought the second place Nissan in. He had smelt fuel in the cockpit but the mechanics found nothing. At this stage, Cobb had done 220 laps, and had a lap's lead over the Nissan, and a further lap ahead of Brun. Alain Ferté was now up to fourth with the Japanese Nissan (216), with the Joest Porsche and Lammers Jaguar closing in quickly. However, all the hard driving came to naught for the #1 Jaguar at 7am, when Alain brought it in steaming and leaking water - stymied by a detached waterpump belt. After 80 minutes of trying, the mechanics had to give up. TWR had left their options open with the #3 and #4 cars with only two drivers committed to each up to now. Walkinshaw promptly transferred Brundle to the leading Nielsen/Cobb car, giving them a third driver, after Nielsen had done two triple-stints with Cobb suffering from dehydration. He found himself in a car with no fourth gear and failing brakes. Not long after, Jaguar's reserve driver Eliseo Salazar got assigned to Jaguar #4 to cover a weary Michel Ferté. His efforts went unrewarded though, as later in the morning, the engine developed a misfire after a missed gear-change by one of the drivers shot fourth gear and the oil pressure plummeted, dropping a valve.

The Jaguar-Nissan battle came to an end at 8:45, when Daly brought the second-placed Nissan in. The fuel-smell had gotten worse, and the mechanics found the fuel bag in the tank was ruptured. But after two hours work, and a replacement bag also splitting, the car was retired. At 10am, with six hours to go, Nielson/Cobb/Brundle had a 2-lap lead over the Brun Porsche. Pareja lost a lap with a flat battery, and then went off at the Ford chicane after colliding with Laffite's Joest Porsche. Despite a series of brake problems Bell was now third in his Joest Porsche, 3 laps further back, with Lammers running a strong 4th and the NISMO Nissan behind. Wollek was 6th in the other Joest car until he made an uncharacteristic mistake and slid off at the first chicane into the tyres. They lost 17 minutes, and a position, to the quiet achiever, the Alpha Porsche. Then either side of midday, the leaders hit dramas. An intransigent brake-calliper change for the leaders helped the Brun team make back a lap with Larrauri in the car for his only stint of the day.) Bell suffered a turbo-exhaust failure and had to limp round to the pits, dropping them off the podium. The Jones/Ferté/Salazar Jaguar had already had a second nose section fitted when its engine packed up, forcing their retirement.

The PC Automotive Spice had led their class through most of the night. For much of that time, they were being challenged by the 3.9 litre Chamberlain Spice until they were delayed by a 45-minute gearbox repair. However, it was not plain sailing for the leaders either. At midnight, they had been in the pits getting body repairs after being clipped by the Kremer Porsche when it spun at the chicane. They were helped out by Dudley Wood and GP Motorsport who loaned them parts to fit a new rear wing. The Graff car had recovered back up to 3rd in class, chased by the Mako team. There were only 6 of the 10 starters left running, although the two GP Motorsport cars were well back with a raft of problems.

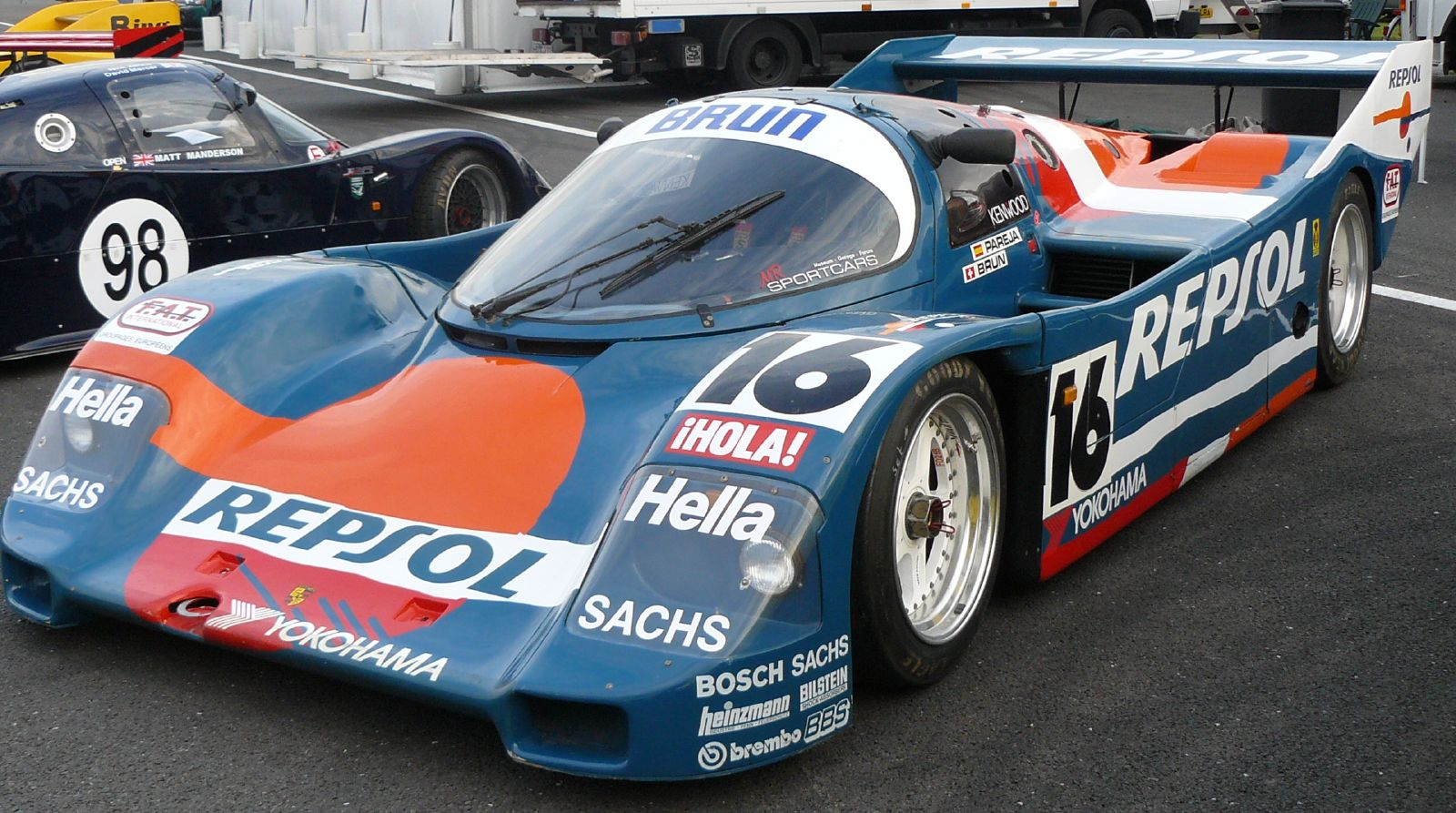
Brun Motorsport Porsche 962

=== Finish and post-race ===
With 3 hours to go, a status quo had settled. The Jaguar, nursing its gearbox, had a close 1-lap lead to the Brun Porsche, itself a comfortable three laps ahead of the second Jaguar. The Alpha Porsche was dicing with the NISMO Nissan for 4th and the leading Joest car was 6th. The Lees/Sekiya/Ogawa Toyota had had a reliable race and quietly moved up the order into 7th, as had the Courage behind it. The Hoshino Nissan then struck gearbox problems which slowed their pace, and allowing the Joest car to overtake them. At the front, neither team could afford a mistake. A late-race rain-shower threatened to spice things up. In the last hour, the Jaguars teamed up in formation to allow a degree of protection to the leader as they circulated in a pack, as they had in 1988. However, in one of the cruellest twists in Le Mans, with less than a quarter hour to go the Brun team saw the oil pressure dive on the computer telemetry. An oil line was leaking and Pareja was radioed to slow down. He sputtered down the Hunaudières straight with a trail of smoke but only made it to the Mulsanne corner before the engine totally seized. On the big-screens, the audience saw the Spanish driver trudge away absolutely devastated.

The last couple of laps were wrapped up without further incident as cars fell in behind the leader. The spectators on the front straight surged onto the track completely filling it, forcing the marshals to flag the field into the pit lane rather than taking the chequered flag. An unexpected second place thus fell into the lap of the Lammers/Wallace/Konrad Jaguar, and third place went to the reliable Alpha Racing Porsche, which had not missed a beat. The only note of concern had been when Reid had been following a train of cars and debris (possibly a wing-mirror) had flown back and struck his windscreen, sending a small glass sliver into his eye, necessitating a stop to have it carefully removed. Fourth was the Joest Porsche of Stuck/Bell/Jelinski, with the Nissan coming home in 5th (albeit with only first and fifth gears). After a promising start, this was a relatively poor return for the company from such a major effort. The fifth Nissan had had a difficult race with many hours spent in the pits fixing water leaks, a lost wheel, a coolant pipe, gearbox and suspension problems. However, at the back of the field with fuel consumption no longer an issue, Millen got a consolation prize setting the fastest lap of the race on the new circuit in the night hours. They eventually finished 17th, 500 km behind their teammates. Sixth was the Toyota, which was the marque's best finish at Le Mans to date. Never on the pace of the Nissans or Jaguars, they were initially delayed by fuel vaporisation issues in the hot afternoon sun. However, they had got back up to 12th by mid-evening and were fortunate not to be damaged after Sekiya's brush with the Lancia. Come the new day, the fuel issues returned slowing the car down and in the end they finished mere seconds ahead of the Cougar. The French car had hung around, just outside the top-10, for most of the race duelling with the Schuppan Porsche. As other cars fell, they stayed out of trouble and 7th was a good reward.

Both Kremer Porsches finished, albeit well down the field. Initially well placed, van der Merwe was stopped at 7.20pm by an electrical failure and it was 8pm before he finally got back to the pits. At midnight, Okada spun at the chicane, clipping the C2 class-leading Spice and losing more time. They were methodically moving up the order when the gearbox broke at 1pm. After inspection, the team parked the car until just before 4pm, when they slammed it into a gear to make it to the finish and be classified. The other Kremer car was also in the pits at lunchtime, getting a new rear-end fitted. Having run in 14th through the morning, they finished 16th. The two Schuppan Porsches also finished (in 12th and 15th), after a torrid race. Both suffered broken exhausts and had a number of brakepad changes (six for Haywood's car, nine for Elgh's). Mazda won the GTP class, as expected, but it was by no means a convincing win, with the team's 3rd car coming home in 20th. The only car in the class for the second half of the race, they had spent 90 minutes at breakfast time getting the gearbox rebuilt, only getting back out by pillaging parts from their stricken teammates. One place back was the PC Automotive Spice winning the C2 class. Despite needing three new batteries, they cruised to the win with a 13-lap margin (almost 180 kms) over the Graff car. The winner of the Index of Energy Efficiency was the Mako Spice. After their early delays, the crew had to perform three gearbox rebuilds. Subsequently however, with no pressure on fuel consumption, they were the only car to finish the race with a positive differential.

For Jaguar, celebrating its 40th year at Le Mans, the 1-2 victory was a suitable farewell present for the company’s departing Chairman, Sir John Egan, who was up on the winners' podium with the team. In November, the Ford Motor Company paid US$2.5 billion (twice its stock market value) to buy a controlling interest in the Jaguar company. Spice's experiment with being the first 3.5-litre car, although initially uncompetitive had gradually been getting better towards the end of the season, with no fuel restrictions. However, it had been ruinously expensive, and Gordon Spice was bankrupted at the end of the year. The team was forced up for sale, unable to hold out for just the few more months until the official new season started. Near the end of the Championship season, the first of the big factory teams arrived with a car for the 3.5-litre formula when Peugeot unveiled its bold, new 905.

In the World Sports Prototype Championship, the Mercedes C11 won 8 of the 9 rounds of the series. The victory at the final race went to Jochen Mass and the works team's young driver Michael Schumacher. The short-tail Brun and Alpha Porsches had proven a point to Joest and the rest of the langhecks, that outright speed and high downforce are no longer the answer. The close racing and late-race drama had hinted that perhaps the World Championship needed Le Mans more than the other way around.

== Official results ==
=== Finishers ===
Results taken from Quentin Spurring's book, officially licensed by the ACO
Class Winners are in Bold text.

Pos	Class	No.	Team	Drivers	Chassis	Engine	Tyre	Laps
1	**Gr.C1**	**3**	**(United Kingdom) Silk Cut Jaguar Team** **(United Kingdom) Tom Walkinshaw Racing**	**(Denmark) John Nielsen** **(United States) Price Cobb** **(United Kingdom) Martin Brundle**	Jaguar XJR-12LM	Jaguar 7.0L V12	G	359
2	Gr.C1	2	**(United Kingdom)** Silk Cut Jaguar Team **(United Kingdom)** Tom Walkinshaw Racing	(Netherlands) Jan Lammers (United Kingdom) Andy Wallace (Austria) Franz Konrad	Jaguar XJR-12LM	Jaguar 7.0L V12	G	355
3	Gr.C1	45	(Japan) Alpha Racing Team	(United Kingdom) Tiff Needell (United Kingdom) Anthony Reid (United Kingdom) David Sears	Porsche 962C	Porsche 935/82 3.0L F6 twin turbo	Y	352
4	Gr.C1	7	(West Germany) Joest Porsche Racing	(United Kingdom) Derek Bell (West Germany) Hans-Joachim Stuck (West Germany) Frank Jelinski	Porsche 962C	Porsche 935/82 3.0L F6 twin turbo	M	350
5	Gr.C1	23	(Japan) Nissan Motorsports International	(Japan) Masahiro Hasemi (Japan) Kazuyoshi Hoshino (Japan) Toshio Suzuki	Nissan R90CP	Nissan VRH35Z 3.5L V8 twin turbo	D	348
6	Gr.C1	36	(Japan) Toyota Team TOM'S	(United Kingdom) Geoff Lees (Japan) Masanori Sekiya (Japan) Hitoshi Ogawa	Toyota 90C-V	Toyota R32V 3.2L V8 twin turbo	B	347
7	Gr.C1	13	(France) Courage Compétition	(France) Pascal Fabre (France) Michel Trollé (France) Lionel Robert	Cougar C24S	Porsche 935/83 3.0L F6 twin turbo	G	347
8	Gr.C1	9	(West Germany) Joest Porsche Racing	(France) Bob Wollek (Sweden) Stanley Dickens (West Germany) "John Winter" (Louis Krages)	Porsche 962C	Porsche 935/82 3.0L F6 twin turbo	M	346
9	Gr.C1	27	(West Germany) Obermaier Racing (France) Primagaz Compétition	(West Germany) Jürgen Lässig (France) Pierre Yver (West Germany) Otto Altenbach	Porsche 962C	Porsche 935/82 3.0L F6 twin turbo	G	341
10	Gr.C1	15	(Switzerland) Brun Motorsport	(Norway) Harald Huysman (Italy) Massimo Sigala (Switzerland) Bernard Santal	Porsche 962C	Porsche 935/82 3.0L F6 twin turbo	Y	335
11	Gr.C1	44	(United Kingdom) Italya Sports Richard Lloyd Racing	(United Kingdom) John Watson (Italy) Bruno Giacomelli (Canada) Allen Berg	Porsche 962C	Porsche 935/82 3.0L F6 twin turbo	G	335
12	Gr.C1	33	(Australia) Team Schuppan Takefuji	(United States) Hurley Haywood (South Africa) Wayne Taylor (Sweden) Rickard Rydell	Porsche 962C	Porsche 935/82 3.0L F6 twin turbo	D	332
13	Gr.C1	63	(Japan) Trust Racing Team	(South Africa) George Fouché (Sweden) Steven Andskär (Japan) Shunji Kasuya	Porsche 962C	Porsche 935/82 3.0L F6 twin turbo	D	330
14	Gr.C1	6	(West Germany) Joest Porsche Racing	(France) Henri Pescarolo (France) Jacques Laffite (France) Jean-Louis Ricci	Porsche 962C	Porsche 935/82 3.0L F6 twin turbo	G	328
15	Gr.C1	55	(United Kingdom) / (Australia) Team Schuppan Omron	(Sweden) Eje Elgh (Sweden) Thomas Danielsson (Australia) Tomas Mezera	Porsche 962C	Porsche 935/82 3.0L F6 twin turbo	D	326
16	Gr.C1	11	(West Germany) Porsche Kremer Racing	(France) Philippe Alliot (Belgium) Bernard de Dryver (France) Patrick Gonin	Porsche 962C-K6	Porsche 935/82 3.0L F6 twin turbo	Y	319
17	Gr.C1	84	(Japan) Nissan Motorsports (United States) Nissan Performance Technology	(New Zealand) Steve Millen (Republic of Ireland) Michael Roe (United States) Bob Earl	Nissan R90CK	Nissan VRH35Z 3.5L V8 twin turbo	G	311
18	Gr.C1/3.5L	21	(United Kingdom) Spice Engineering	(Spain) Fermín Velez (United Kingdom) Tim Harvey (United Kingdom) Chris Hodgetts	Spice SE90C	Cosworth DFR 3.5L V8	G	308
19	Gr.C1	20	(United Kingdom) Team Davey (private entrant)	(United Kingdom) Tim Lee-Davey (Morocco) Max Cohen-Olivar (Italy) Giovanni Lavaggi	Porsche 962C	Porsche 935/82 3.0L F6 twin turbo	D	306
20	**IMSA**; **GTP**	**203**	**(Japan) Mazdaspeed**	**(Japan) Yojiro Terada** **(Japan) Takashi Yorino** **(Japan) Yoshimi Katayama**	Mazda 767B	Mazda 13J-MM 2.6L quad-rotary	D	304
21	**Gr.C2**	**116**	**(United Kingdom) PC Automotive** (private entrant)	**(United Kingdom) Richard Piper** **(France) Olindo Iacobelli** **(United Kingdom) Mike Youles**	Spice SE89C	Cosworth DFL 3.3L V8	G	304
22	Gr.C1	82	(France) Courage Compétition	(Belgium) Hervé Regout (France) Alain Cudini (Greece) Costas Los	Nissan R89C	Nissan VRH35Z 3.5L V8 twin turbo	G	300
23	Gr.C2	102	(France) Graff Racing	(France) Xavier Lapeyre (France) Jean-Philippe Grand (France) Michel Maisonneuve	Spice SE89C	Cosworth DFL 3.3L V8	G	291
24	Gr.C1	10	(West Germany) Porsche Kremer Racing	(Japan) Kunimitsu Takahashi (South Africa) Sarel van der Merwe (Japan) Hideki Okada	Porsche 962C-K6	Porsche 935/82 3.0L F6 twin turbo	Y	279
25	Gr.C2	103	(United Kingdom) Team Mako (private entrant)	(Canada) Robbie Stirling (United Kingdom) James Shead (United Kingdom) Ross Hyett	Spice-Fiero SE88C	Cosworth DFL 3.3L V8	G	274
26	Gr.C1	19	(United Kingdom) Team Davey (private entrant)	(Japan) Katsunori Iketani (United Kingdom) Tim Lee-Davey (Morocco) Max Cohen-Olivar	Porsche 962C	Porsche 935/82 3.0L F6 twin turbo	D	261
27	Gr.C2	131	(United Kingdom) GP Motorsport	(United Kingdom) Richard Jones (United Kingdom) Dudley Wood (United States) Stephen Hynes	Spice-Fiero SE87C	Cosworth DFL 4.0L V8	G	260
28	Gr.C2	132	(United Kingdom) GP Motorsport	(United Kingdom) Alistair Fenwick (New Zealand) Craig Simmiss (United Kingdom) Alex Postan	Tiga GC286/9	Cosworth DFL 4.0L V8	G	254

=== Did not finish ===
Pos	Class	No	Team	Drivers	Chassis	Engine	Tyre	Laps	Reason
DNF	Gr.C1	16	(Switzerland) Repsol Brun Motorsport	(Switzerland) Walter Brun (Argentina) Oscar Larrauri (Spain) Jesús Pareja	Porsche 962C	Porsche 935/82 3.0L F6 twin turbo	Y	353	Engine (24hr)
DNF	Gr.C1	4	**(United Kingdom)** Silk Cut Jaguar Team **(United Kingdom)** Tom Walkinshaw Racing	(United States) Davy Jones (France) Michel Ferté (Chile) Eliseo Salazar	Jaguar XJR-12LM	Jaguar 7.0L V12	G	282	Engine (21hr)
DNF	Gr.C2	128	(United Kingdom) Chamberlain Engineering	(France) Philippe de Henning (Netherlands) Charles Zwolsman (United Kingdom) Robin Donovan	Spice SE90C	Cosworth DFL 4.0L V8	G	254	Engine (24hr)
DNF	Gr.C1	83	(Japan) Nissan Motorsports (United States) Nissan Performance; Technology	(Australia) Geoff Brabham (United States) Chip Robinson (Republic of Ireland) Derek Daly	Nissan R90CK	Nissan VRH35Z 3.5L V8 twin turbo	G	251	Fuel Cell (17hr)
DNF	Gr.C1	38	(Japan) Toyota Team TOM'S	(France) Pierre-Henri Raphanel (Austria) Roland Ratzenberger (Japan) Naoki Nagasaka	Toyota 90C-V	Toyota R32V 3.2L V8 twin turbo	G	241	Electrics (19hr)
DNF	Gr.C1	1	**(United Kingdom)** Silk Cut Jaguar Team **(United Kingdom)** Tom Walkinshaw Racing	(France) Alain Ferté (United Kingdom) David Leslie (United Kingdom) Martin Brundle	Jaguar XJR-12LM	Jaguar 7.0L V12	G	220	Engine (15hr)
DNF	Gr.C1	85	(Japan) Team LeMans Co	(Japan) Takao Wada (Sweden) Anders Olofsson (Brazil) Maurizio Sandro Sala	Nissan R89C	Nissan VRH35Z 3.5L V8 twin turbo	Y	182	Electrics (15hr)
DNF	Gr.C1	43	(United Kingdom) Italya Sport; Richard Lloyd Racing	(Germany) Manuel Reuter (Finland) JJ Lehto (United Kingdom) James Weaver	Porsche 962C GTi	Porsche 935/82 3.0L F6 twin turbo	G	181	Fire (14hr)
DNF	Gr.C2	107	(Switzerland) P.-A. Lombardi (private entrant)	(Switzerland) Pierre-Alain Lombardi (France) Denis Morin (France) Ferdinand de Lesseps	Spice-Fiero SE87C	Cosworth DFL 3.3L V8	G	170	Accident (15hr)
DNF	Gr.C2	105	(United Kingdom) ADA Engineering (private entrant)	(United Kingdom) Ian Harrower (United Kingdom) John Sheldon (United Kingdom) Jerry Mahony	ADA 02B	Cosworth DFL 3.3L V8	G	164	Suspension (15hr)
DNF	IMSA; GTP	201	(Japan) Mazdaspeed	(Sweden) Stefan Johansson (Republic of Ireland) David Kennedy (Belgium) Pierre Dieudonné	Mazda 787	Mazda R26B 2.6L quad-rotary	D	148	Electrics (12hr)
DNF	IMSA; GTP	202	(Japan) Mazdaspeed	(United Kingdom) Johnny Herbert (West Germany) Volker Weidler (Belgium) Bertrand Gachot	Mazda 787	Mazda R26B 2.6L quad-rotary	D	147	Engine (14hr)
DNF	Gr.C1	24	(Japan) Nissan Motorsports (United Kingdom) Nissan Motorsports Europe	(United Kingdom) Mark Blundell (United Kingdom) Julian Bailey (Italy) Gianfranco Brancatelli	Nissan R90CK	Nissan VRH35Z 3.5L V8 twin turbo	D	142	Gearbox (12hr)
DNF	Gr.C1	26	(West Germany) Obermaier Racing (France) Primagaz Compétition	(West Germany) Harald Grohs (Belgium) Marc Duez (West Germany) Jürgen Oppermann	Porsche 962C	Porsche 935/82 3.0L F6 twin turbo	G	140	Gearbox (11hr)
DNF	IMSA; GTP	230	(West Germany) Momo Gebhardt Racing	(Italy) Gianpiero Moretti (United Kingdom) Nick Adams (West Germany) Günther Gebhardt	Porsche 962 GS	Porsche 935/82 3.0L F6 twin turbo	G	138	Gearbox (11hr)
DNF	Gr.C1	54	(Italy) Mussato Action Car	(Italy) Massimo Monti (Italy) Fabio Magnani (United Kingdom) Andrew Hepworth	Lancia LC2 SP90	Ferrari 308C 3.1L V8 twin turbo	D	86	Accident (10hr)
DNF	Gr.C1	37	(Japan) Toyota Team TOM'S	(Japan) Aguri Suzuki (United Kingdom) Johnny, Earl Dumfries (Italy) Roberto Ravaglia	Toyota 90C-V	Toyota R32V 3.2L V8 twin turbo	B	64	Accident (5hr)
DNF	Gr.C1	12	(France) Courage Compétition	(Switzerland) Bernard Thuner (France) Pascal Pessiot (France) Alain Ianetta	Cougar C24S	Porsche 935/82 3.0L F6 twin turbo	G	57	Engine (5hr)
DNF	Gr.C2	113	(France) Etablissements Chéreau (private entrant)	(France) Philippe Farjon (France) Jean Messaoudi	Cougar C20B	Porsche 935 2.8L F6 turbo	G	43	Accident (4hr)
DNF	Gr.C2	106	(France) Automobiles Louis Descartes (private entrant)	(France) François Migault (France) Gérard Tremblay (France) Jacques Heuclin	ALD C289	Cosworth DFL 3.3L V8	D	36	Gearbox (6hr)

=== Did not start ===
Pos	Class	No	Team	Drivers	Chassis	Engine	Tyre	Reason
DNS	Gr.C1	25	(Japan) Nissan Motorsports (United Kingdom) Nissan Motorsports Europe	(Republic of Ireland) Kenny Acheson (United Kingdom) Martin Donnelly (France) Olivier Grouillard	Nissan R90CK	Nissan VRH35Z 3.5L V8 twin turbo	D	Gearbox, on pace lap
DNS	Gr.C1	8	(West Germany) Joest Porsche Racing	(France) Bob Wollek (United Kingdom) Jonathan Palmer (France) Philippe Alliot	Porsche 962C	Porsche 935/82 3.0L F6 twin turbo	M	Accident in practice
DNQ	Gr.C1/3.5L	30	(United Kingdom) GP Motorsport	(France) Pierre de Thoisy (West Germany) Quirin Bovy (Spain) Francisco Egózcue	Spice SE90C	Cosworth DFR 3.5L V8	G	Did not qualify
DNQ	Gr.C1	59	(United States) Eagle Technologies Racing (United States) P. Canary (private entrant)	(United States) Paul Canary (United States) Dennis Kazmerowski (United States) David Vegher	Eagle 700	Chevrolet 10.2L V8	G	Did not qualify
DNQ	Gr.C1/3.5L	61	(France) ASA Armagnac Bigorre (private entrant)	(France) Norbert Santos (France) Noël del Bello (France) Daniel Boccard	Norma M6	Moteur Guy Nègre 3.5L W12	A	Did not qualify
DNA	Gr.C1	14	(United Kingdom) Richard Lloyd Racing		Porsche 962C GTi	Porsche 935/82 3.0L F6 twin turbo		Did not arrive
DNA	Gr.C1	18	(United Kingdom) Team Davey (private entrant)	(Japan) Katsunori Iketani	Porsche 962C	Porsche 935/82 3.0L F6 twin turbo	D	Did not arrive
DNA	Gr.C1	42	(France) Courage Compétition		Nissan R89C	Nissan VRH35Z 3.5L V8 twin turbo		Did not arrive
DNQ	Gr.C2	110	(United Kingdom) Argo Racing Cars	(United Kingdom) Ian Khan (France) Anne Baverey (United States) Michael Dow	Argo JM19C	Cosworth DFL 3.3L V8	G	Did not qualify

=== Class winners ===
Class	Winning car	Winning drivers
Group C1	#3 Jaguar XJR-12LM	Nielsen / Cobb / Brundle *
Group C2	#116 Spice SE89C	Piper / Iacobelli / Youles *
IMSA-GTP	#203 Mazda 767B	Terada / Yorino / Katayama *
Note *: setting a new class distance record for the circuit. (All were new, as this was a revised circuit layout)

=== Index of Energy Efficiency ===
Pos	Class	No	Team	Drivers	Chassis	Score
1	Gr.C2	103	(United Kingdom) Team Mako (private entrant)	(Canada) Robbie Stirling (United Kingdom) James Shead (United Kingdom) Ross Hyett	Spice-Fiero SE88C	3.198
2	Gr.C2	131	(United Kingdom) GP Motorsport	(United Kingdom) Richard Jones (United Kingdom) Dudley Wood (United States) Stephen Hynes	Spice-Fiero SE87C	-1.672
3	Gr.C2	102	(France) Graff Racing	(France) Xavier Lapeyre (France) Jean-Philippe Grand (France) Michel Maisonneuve	Spice SE89C	-3.182
4	Gr.C1/3.5L	21	(United Kingdom) Spice Engineering	(Spain) Fermín Velez (United Kingdom) Tim Harvey (United Kingdom) Chris Hodgetts	Spice SE90C	-4.085
5	Gr.C1	33	(Australia) Team Schuppan Takefuji	(United States) Hurley Haywood (South Africa) Wayne Taylor (Sweden) Rickard Rydell	Porsche 962C	-4.548
6	Gr.C1	9	(West Germany) Joest Porsche Racing	(France) Bob Wollek (Sweden) Stanley Dickens (West Germany) "John Winter" (Louis Krages)	Porsche 962C	-5.278
7	Gr.C1	44	(United Kingdom) Italya Sports; Richard Lloyd Racing	(United Kingdom) John Watson (Italy) Bruno Giacomelli (Canada) Allen Berg	Porsche 962C	-5.595
8	Gr.C1	7	(West Germany) Joest Porsche Racing	(United Kingdom) Derek Bell (West Germany) Hans-Joachim Stuck (West Germany) Frank Jelinski	Porsche 962C	-5.660
9	Gr.C1	84	(United States) Nissan Performance; Technology	(New Zealand) Steve Millen (Republic of Ireland) Michael Roe (United States) Bob Earl	Nissan R90CK	-5.684
10	Gr.C1	11	(West Germany) Porsche Kremer Racing	(France) Philippe Alliot (Belgium) Bernard de Dryver (France) Patrick Gonin	Porsche 962C-K6	-5.815

- Note: Only the top ten positions are included in this set of standings.

=== Statistics ===
Taken from Quentin Spurring's book, officially licensed by the ACO

- Pole Position – M. Blundell, #24 Nissan R90CK - 3:27.0secs; 236.5 km/h (147.0 mph)
- Fastest Lap – S. Millen, #84 Nissan R90CK - 3:40.0secs; 222.5 km/h (138.3 mph)
- Winning Distance – 4,882.40 km (3,033.78 mi)
- Winner's Average Speed – 204.0 km/h (126.8 mph)
- Attendance – 235,000-240,000
