= Joël Gouhier =

French former racing driver (born 1949)

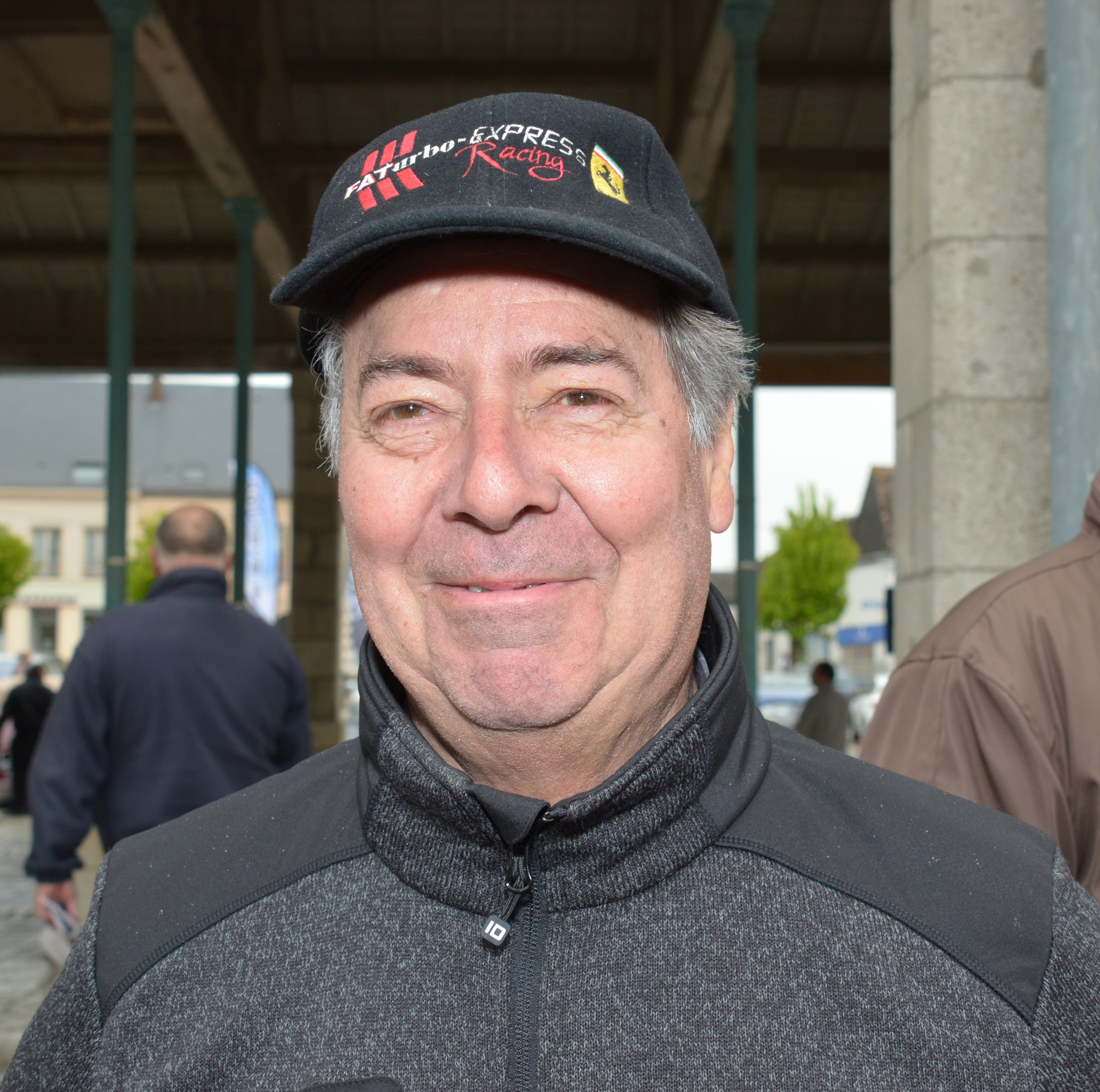
- Born: 22 October 1949 (age 76); Nogent-le-Rotrou, France

24 Hours of Le Mans career
- Years: 1983–1986; 1993–1994
- Teams: Ford France; Brun Motorsport; Larbre Compétition; Ferrari Club Italia

Joël Gouhier (born 22 October 1949) is a French former racing driver. He raced in the 24 Hours of Le Mans from 1983 until 1986, where he returned to the series in 1993 and retiring in 1994. He also raced in the 24 Hours of Spa.

== Racing record ==
=== 24 Hours of Le Mans results ===
Year	Team	Co-Drivers	Car	Class	Laps	Pos.	Class Pos.
1983	Jean Rondeau; Ford France	(United Kingdom) Vic Elford (France) Anny-Charlotte Verney	Rondeau M379	C	136	DNF	DNF
1984	(Switzerland) Brun Motorsport GmbH	(Italy) Massimo Sigala (Argentina) Oscar Larrauri	Porsche 956	C1	335	7th	7th
1985	(Switzerland) Brun Motorsport	(Switzerland) Walter Brun (Belgium) Didier Theys	Porsche 962C	C1	304	DNF	DNF
1986	(Switzerland) Brun Motorsport	(Argentina) Oscar Larrauri (Spain) Jesús Pareja	Porsche 962C	C1	360	2nd	2nd
1993	(France) Monaco Media International (France) Larbre Compétition	(France) Dominique Dupuy (Germany) Jürgen Barth	Porsche 911 Carrera RSR	GT	304	15th	1st
1994	(Italy) Ferrari Club Italia	(Argentina) Oscar Larrauri (Italy) Fabio Mancini	Ferrari 348 GTC-LM	GT2	23	DNF	DNF

Sporting positions
Preceded by Alain Prost	Championnat de Formule Renault Nationale Champion; 1977	Succeeded by Philippe Alliot
