= Brun C91 =

Racing sports prototype

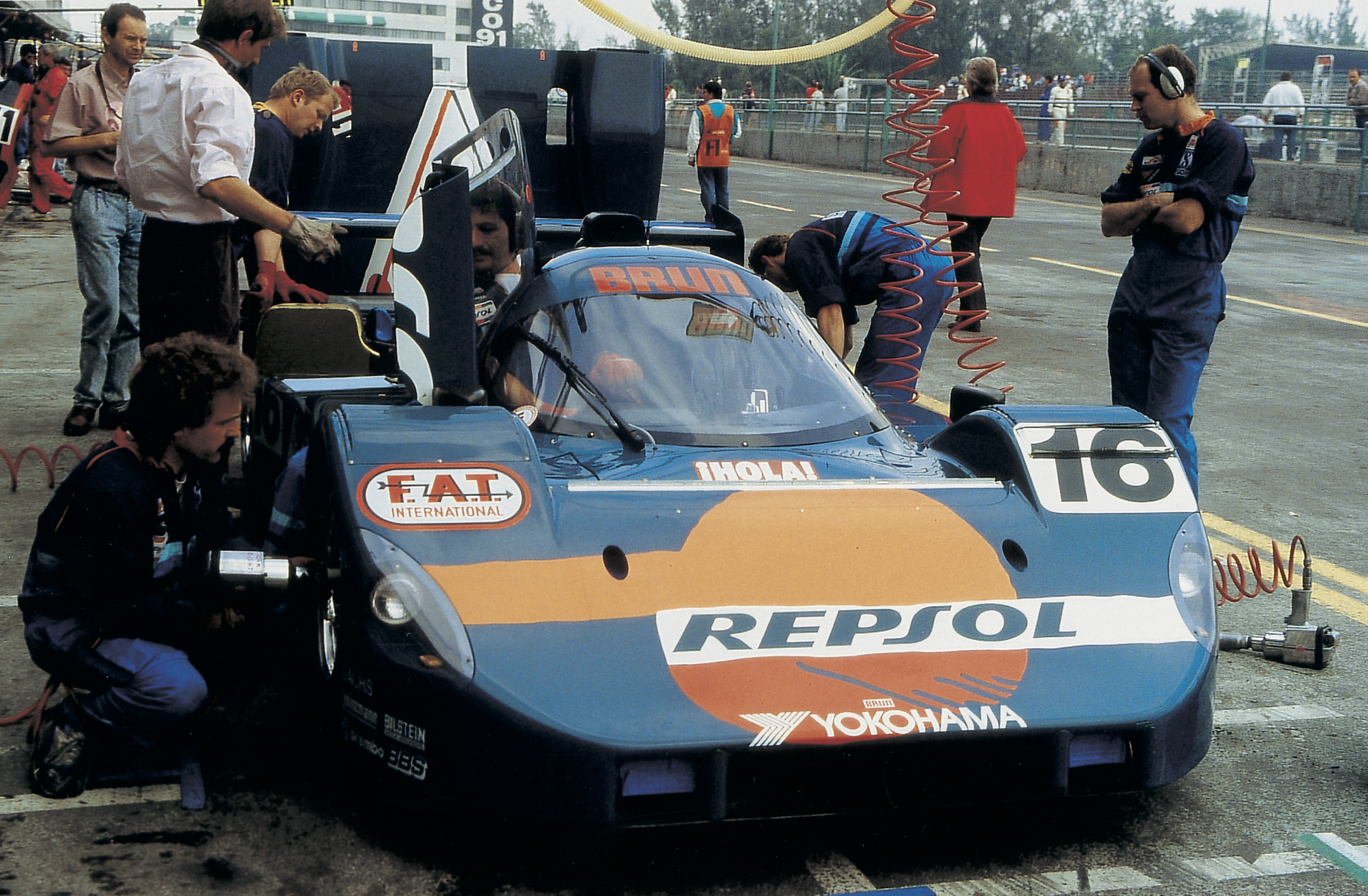
- The Brun C91 at Autódromo Hermanos Rodríguez in 1991
- Category: Sports car racing
- Constructor: Brun Motorsport
- Designers: Steve Ridgers; John Iley; Hayden Burvill

Technical specifications
- Chassis: Carbon monocoque
- Engine: Judd EV 3500cc V8. Naturally aspirated mid-mounted
- Transmission: 6-speed manual transmission
- Fuel: Repsol
- Tyres: Yokohama

Competition history
- Notable entrants: Brun Motorsport
- Notable drivers: (Switzerland) Gregor Foitek (Argentina) Oscar Larrauri (Spain) Jésus Pareja
- Debut: 1991 430km of Nürburgring
- Last season: 1991
Races	Wins	Poles	F/Laps
4	0	0	0
- Constructors' Championships: 0
- Drivers' Championships: 0

The Brun C91 was a sports prototype built for Group C racing in the 1991 World Sportscar Championship season. It was built by Walter Brun's Brun Motorsport of Switzerland, by a team which included Steve Ridgers, John Iley and Hayden Burvill. It is the only car that Brun has built to date.

== Development ==
Following the end of the EuroBrun Formula One partnership in 1990, Brun Motorsport found itself concentrating on the World Sportscar Championship for 1991. At the time using their familiar Porsche 962, Brun began work on a new car intended to begin competition in late 1991 and then continuing into 1992, when the new World Sportscar Championship rules would come into effect. These new rules, which required 3.5 liter engines would make their 962 illegal. Therefore, instead of buying another chassis, Brun and backer and sponsor Repsol YPF decided to invest in building a new car, naming it the C91. The design would be similar to most other 3.5 liter Group C cars, using large double rear wings, low bodywork and long high downforce noses. The design and development were carried out at Brun Technics engineering office in Basingstoke. The chassis was built by Advanced Composites.

For an engine, Brun would retain a connection he had had during the EuroBrun days. Since World Sportscar Championship regulations would allow for engines identical to Formula One days, Brun reached an agreement with Engine Developments to use older F1 Judd EV V8s, a successor to the Judd CVs V8s that EuroBrun had used.

== Racing history ==
To start 1991, Brun campaigned a pair of 962 to some success, earning points in every race of the season until the debut of the C91 at the fifth round at the Nürburgring. The C91 would be driven by former EuroBrun drivers Gregor Foitek and Oscar Larrauri. The car would not race due to technical difficulties after qualifying. At the next round at Magny-Cours, Jésus Pareja would replace Foitek as the C91 would start the race. Its competition debut was short lived as the engine would fail after a mere five laps.

For the fly-away round in Mexico City, the C91 would show some more potential by lasting 31 laps before a failed starter motor forced it to retire. However, for the final round in Autopolis, Japan, the C91 would yet again fail, having only made it 20 laps before the gearbox broke.

Thus at the end of the season, the C91 had yet to finish a single race. Brun would manage to score points with their 962 in each of the rounds except Magny-Cours and Suzuka. Brun intended to enter the car in 1992, but funding failed to materialize and the C91 was retired. The car would later be sold to private owners, and is currently being run in Historic Sportscar Racing.

== Historic racing ==
The C91 made a return to racing in the Group C Racing series by Peter Auto in 2023 at Spa-Francorchamps, though failed to start either race at the Spa Classic event. The car returned to the series at the Paul Ricard Dix Mille Tours venue, qualifying on pole for and winning both races, being driven by Alex Müller.
