= Jesús Pareja =

Spanish racing driver

Jesús Ángel Pareja Mayo (born 6 March 1955) is a retired Spanish racing driver. Pareja drove in the FIA World Sports-Prototype Championship, the Spanish Touring Car Championship and Global GT Championship.

== The 1990 Montreal incident ==
Pareja was involved in a massive accident during the 1990 WSPC round at Montreal. On his 59th lap driving a Porsche 962C entered by (and shared with) Walter Brun, he hit a fragment of a manhole cover which had been torn out of the ground by a car further ahead. Several cars hit the debris but Pareja was especially unfortunate. His fuel tank was ruptured and the car immediately burst into flames. Remarkably, the marshals were able to put the fire out and rescue Pareja.

== Later career ==
Pareja was a winner of the Le Mans 24 hours in the GT2 class in 1994.

From 1999, Pareja had been involved with the running of the European GT Championship]and the Spanish Formula Three Championship. He is the founder and CEO of GT Sport which was created in 1998 and runs the International GT Open and the Euroformula Open. Pareja made select appearances on the racing circuit, with one of the most memorable being the 2007 Martini Legends race in Barcelona. There, he raced alongside motorsport icons such as the legendary Brazilian Emerson Fittipaldi, a two-time Formula 1 world champion; the French endurance specialist Henri Pescarolo, celebrated for his victories at the 24 Hours of Le Mans; and the Spanish driver Marc Gené. For this event, Pareja drove the iconic Porsche 917—the same car David Piper piloted in the classic film Le Mans, starring Steve McQueen.

A decade later, in 2017, the World Motor Sport Council gave GT Sport the green light during its Vienna meeting to organize both a European Touring Car Championship (TC Open) and an annual 1,000-kilometer endurance race (GT Open 1000).

The following year, Pareja received the prestigious “Gold Badge” from the Royal Spanish Automobile Federation, honoring his achievements as both a driver and a key figure in promoting the sport.

== Racing results ==
=== 24 Hours of Le Mans results ===
Year	Team	Co-Drivers	Car	Class	Laps	Pos.	Class Pos.
1985	(Germany) Ducados Obermaier Racing	(Germany) Jürgen Lässig (Belgium) Hervé Regout	Porsche 956	Gr. C1	357	8th	8th
1986	(Switzerland) Brun Motorsport	(France) Joël Gouhier (Argentina) Oscar Larrauri	Porsche 962C	Cr. C1	360	2nd	2nd
1987	(Switzerland) Brun Motorsport	(Argentina) Oscar Larrauri (Germany) Uwe Schäfer	Porsche 962C	Cr. C1	40	DNF	DNF
1988	(Switzerland) Repsol Brun Motorsport	(Germany) Uwe Schäfer (Italy) Massimo Sigala	Porsche 962C	C1	372	7th	7th
1989	(Switzerland) Brun Motorsport	(Switzerland) Walter Brun (Argentina) Oscar Larrauri	Porsche 962C	C1	242	DNF	DNF
1990	(Switzerland) Repsol Brun Motorsport	(Switzerland) Walter Brun (Argentina) Oscar Larrauri	Porsche 962C	C1	353	DNF	DNF
1991	(Switzerland) Brun Motorsport	(Switzerland) Walter Brun (Argentina) Oscar Larrauri	Porsche 962C	C2	338	10th	10th
1992	(Netherlands) Euro Racing	(Netherlands) Cor Euser (Netherlands) Charles Zwolsman	Lola T92/10-Judd	C1	50	DNF	DNF
1993	(France) Jack Leconte (France) Larbre Compétition	(France) Pierre de Thoisy (France) Jack Leconte	Porsche 911 Carrera RSR	C4	301	16th	2nd
1994	(France) Larbre Compétition	(France) Dominique Dupuy (Spain) Carlos Palau	Porsche 911 Carrera RSR	LMGT2	308	8th	1st
1995	(France) Société Larbre Compétition	(France) Érik Comas (France) Jean-Pierre Jarier	Porsche 911 GT2 Evo	LMGT1	64	DNF	DNF
1996	(Germany) Roock Racing Team	(United Kingdom) Dominic Chappell (France) Jean-Pierre Jarier	Porsche 911 GT2 Evo	LMGT1	93	DNF	DNF
1997	(United Kingdom) Pacific Racing Ltd.	(Chile) Eliseo Salazar (Finland) Harri Toivonen	BRM P301-Nissan	LMP	6	DNF	DNF
