= Oscar Larrauri =

Argentine racing driver (born 1954)

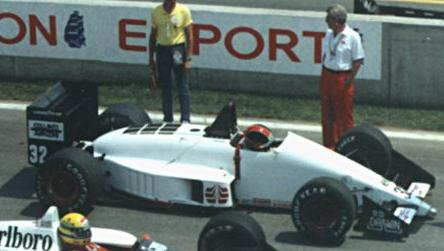
- Larrauri driving for EuroBrun at the 1988 Canadian Grand Prix
- Born: Oscar Rubén Larrauri; 19 August 1954 (age 72); Rosario, Santa Fe, Argentina

Formula One World Championship career
- Nationality: (Argentina) Argentine
- Active years: 1988–1989
- Team: EuroBrun
- Entries: 21 (7 starts)
- Championships: 0
- Wins: 0
- Podiums: 0
- Career points: 0
- Pole positions: 0
- Fastest laps: 0
- First entry: 1988 Brazilian Grand Prix
- Last entry: 1989 Australian Grand Prix

24 Hours of Le Mans career
- Years: 1983–1987, 1989–1991, 1994
- Teams: Scuderia Sivama Motor, Brun Motorsport, Ferrari
- Best finish: 2nd (1986)
- Class wins: 0

Championship titles
- 1979 1982 1985 1997–1998, 2000: Argentine Formula Three Championship; European Formula Three; Europa Cup Renault Alpine V6 Turbo; South American Super Touring Car Championship

Awards
- 1992: Porsche Cup

Oscar Rubén Larrauri (born 19 August 1954) is a racing driver from Argentina. He participated in 21 Formula One Grands Prix, all with the EuroBrun team, debuting at the 1988 Brazilian Grand Prix. He scored no championship points, only qualifying eight times.

Larrauri was for many years part of Brun Motorsport in sports car racing, and involved in the World Sportscar Championship, IMSA GT Championship, Deutsche Rennsport Meisterschaft, and All Japan Sports Prototype Championship during his career.

== Formula One ==
=== 1988 ===
After winning the 1982 FIA European Formula 3 Championship, Larrauri was involved in Walter Brun's project to move from sportcars to Formula One in 1988. Brun Motorsport formed an alliance with Giampaolo Pavanello's Euroracing team who had previously run the factory backed Alfa Romeo team from 1982-1985. The team became known as EuroBrun and Larrauri was signed to drive for the team alongside 1987 Formula 3000 champion Stefano Modena.

The EuroBrun ER188, powered by the 590 bhp (440 kW; 598 PS) Cosworth DFZ V8 engine, proved to be one of the slowest cars in its debut season. Larrauri's best finish for the year was a 13th place in Mexico (Rd.4) with his only other finish being a 16th place in Germany (Rd.8). With a lack of results coming, Brun initially considered to replace the Argentine mid-season with Christian Danner, but the German could not fit into the car and Larrauri was retained for the rest of the season.

=== 1989 ===
Without a drive at the start of 1989, Larrauri only entered in the last five Grands Prix of the season, again with EuroBrun, though he failed to pre-qualify on each occasion bringing an end to his brief Formula One career. Larrauri then moved back into sports car racing.

== Sportscar racing ==
=== 1992 ===
Larrauri won the Porsche Cup, an annual award presented by Porsche AG to recognize the world's most successful privateer racing driver competing with Porsche machinery in a customer racing team, in 1992.

== Racing record ==
=== Complete European Formula Two Championship results ===
(key)

Year	Entrant	Chassis	Engine	1	2	3	4	5	6	7	8	9	10	11	12	Pos.	Pts
1983	Minardi Team Srl	Minardi M283	BMW	SIL; 7	THR; Ret	HOC; DNS	NÜR	VAL	PAU	JAR	DON	MIS	PER	ZOL	MUG; Ret	NC	0

=== Complete World Sportscar Championship results ===
(key) (Races in bold indicate pole position; races in italics indicate fastest lap)

Year	Entrant	Class	Chassis	Engine	1	2	3	4	5	6	7	8	9	10	11	Pos.	Pts
1983	Scuderia Sivama Motor	C	Lancia LC1	Lancia 1.4 L4t	MNZ	SIL; Ret	NÜR; 5	LMS; NC	SPA	FUJ	KYA					38th	8
1984	Brun Motorsport	C1	Porsche 956	Porsche Type 935 2.6 F6t	MNZ; Ret	SIL; Ret	LMS; 7	NÜR; 6	BRH	MOS; Ret	SPA; 4	IMO; 5	FUJ	KYA	SAN	19th	28
1985	Brun Motorsport	C1	Porsche 956	Porsche Type 935 2.6 F6t	MUG; Ret	MNZ; 6	SIL; 17	LMS; Ret	HOC; 2	MOS	SPA; Ret	BRH	FUJ	SHA; 5		17th	29
1986	Brun Motorsport	C1	Porsche 962C	Porsche Type 935 2.6 F6t	MNZ; 4	SIL; 10	LMS; 2	NOR	BRH; Ret							6th	50
1986	Brun Motorsport	C1	Porsche 962C	Porsche Type 935 2.8 F6t						JER; 1	NÜR; Ret	SPA; Ret	**FUJ**; 7			6th	50
1987	Brun Motorsport	C1	Porsche 962C	Porsche Type 935 2.8 F6t	JAR; 5	JER; 7	MNZ; 3	SIL; Ret	LMS; Ret	NOR; 2						7th	69
1987	Brun Motorsport	C1	Porsche 962C	Porsche Type 935 3.0 F6t							BRH; 5	NÜR; 3	SPA; 3	FUJ; 4		7th	69
1988	Brun Motorsport	C1	Porsche 962C	Porsche Type 935 3.0 F6t	JER; 12	JAR; 6	MNZ; 3	SIL	LMS	BRN	BRH	NÜR; 11	SPA; 4			21st	50
1988	Porsche Kremer Racing	C1	Porsche 962CK6	Porsche Type 935 3.0 F6t										FUJ; 16	SAN	21st	50
1989	Repsol Brun Motorsport	C1	Porsche 962C	Porsche Type 935 3.0 F6t	SUZ; 8	DIJ; 9	JAR; 3	BRH	NÜR; 6	DON; 5	SPA; 4	MEX; 2				7th	54
1990	Repsol Brun Motorsport	C	Porsche 962C	Porsche Type 935 3.0 F6t	SUZ; 6	MNZ; Ret	SIL; 6	SPA; 5	DIJ; 12							17th	4
1990	Repsol Brun Motorsport	C	Porsche 962C	Porsche Type 935 3.2 F6t						NÜR; 8	DON; NC	CGV; 10	MEX; Ret			17th	4
1991	Repsol Brun Motorsport	C1	Porsche 962C	Porsche Type 935 3.2 F6t	SUZ; DSQ	MNZ; 6	SIL; 7	LMS; 10								21st	11
1991	Repsol Brun Motorsport	C1	Brun C91	Judd EV 3.5 V8					NÜR; DNS	MAG; Ret	MEX; Ret	AUT; Ret				21st	11

=== 24 Hours of Le Mans results ===
Year	Team	Co-Drivers	Car	Class	Laps	Pos.	Class Pos.
1983	(Italy) Scuderia Sivama Motor	(Italy) Massimo Sigala (Morocco) Max Cohen-Olivar	Lancia LC1	C	217	NC	NC
1984	(Switzerland) Brun Motorsport	(Italy) Massimo Sigala (France) Joël Gouhier	Porsche 956	C1	335	7th	7th
1985	(Switzerland) Brun Motorsport	(Italy) Massimo Sigala (Italy) Gabriele Tarquini	Porsche 956	C1	323	DNF	DNF
1986	(Switzerland) Brun Motorsport	(France) Joël Gouhier (Spain) Jesús Pareja	Porsche 962C	C1	360	**2nd**	**2nd**
1987	(Switzerland) Brun Motorsport	(Germany) Uwe Schäfer (Spain) Jesús Pareja	Porsche 962C	C1	40	DNF	DNF
1989	(Switzerland) Repsol Brun Motorsport	(Switzerland) Walter Brun (Spain) Jesús Pareja	Porsche 962C	C1	242	DNF	DNF
1990	(Switzerland) Repsol Brun Motorsport	(Switzerland) Walter Brun (Spain) Jesús Pareja	Porsche 962C	C1	353	DNF	DNF
1991	(Switzerland) Repsol Brun Motorsport	(Switzerland) Walter Brun (Spain) Jesús Pareja	Porsche 962C	C2	338	10th	10th
1994	(Italy) Ferrari Club Italia	(France) Joël Gouhier (Italy) Fabio Mancini	Ferrari 348 GTC-LM	GT2	23	DNF	DNF

=== Complete Formula One results ===
(key)

Year	Entrant	Chassis	Engine	1	2	3	4	5	6	7	8	9	10	11	12	13	14	15	16	WDC	Pts
1988	EuroBrun Racing	EuroBrun ER188	Ford Cosworth DFZ 3.5 V8	BRA; DNS	SMR; DNQ	MON; Ret	MEX; 13	CAN; Ret	DET; Ret	FRA; Ret	GBR; DNQ	GER; 16	HUN; DNQ	BEL; DNPQ	ITA; DNPQ	POR; DNPQ	ESP; DNQ	JPN; DNQ	AUS; Ret	NC	0
1989	EuroBrun Racing	EuroBrun ER189	Judd CV 3.5 V8	BRA	SMR	MON	MEX	USA	CAN	FRA	GBR	GER	HUN	BEL	ITA; DNPQ	POR; DNPQ	ESP; DNPQ	JPN; DNPQ	AUS; DNPQ	NC	0

=== Complete Italian Superturismo Championship results ===
Year	Team	Car	1	2	3	4	5	6	7	8	9	10	11	12	13	14	15	16	17	18	19	20	DC	Pts
1995	Jolly Club	Alfa Romeo 155 TS	MIS; 1; 7	MIS; 2; 7	BIN; 1; 8	BIN; 2; 8	MNZ; 1 Ret	MNZ; 2 Ret	IMO; 1; 17	IMO; 2; 6	MAG; 1; 18	MAG; 2; 7	MUG; 1; 6	MUG; 2 Ret	MIS; 1; 7	MIS; 2; 6	PER; 1 Ret	PER; 2; 7	VAR; 1 Ret	VAR; 2; 8	VAL; 1	VAL; 2	10th	48

Sporting positions
Preceded by Mauro Baldi	European Formula Three Champion; 1982	Succeeded by Pierluigi Martini
Preceded by Jan Lammers	Europa Cup Renault Alpine V6 Turbo Champion; 1985	Succeeded by Massimo Sigala
Preceded by Championship began	South American Super Touring Car Champion; 1997-1998	Succeeded by Emiliano Spataro-Cacá Bueno
Preceded by Emiliano Spataro-Cacá Bueno	South American Super Touring Car Champion; 2000	Succeeded by Championship ended
