= Massimo Sigala =

Italian racing driver

- Nationality: Italian
- Born: January 7, 1951 (age 75) Messina, Italy
- Retired: 1996
- Years active: 20
- Teams: Renault; Alfa Romeo; Lancia; Porsche; Nissan; Ferrari 333

Massimo Sigala (born 7 January 1951) is an Italian former racing driver and co-founder of the Trident Racing.

== Racing results ==
=== 24 Hours of Le Mans results ===
Year	Team	Co-Drivers	Car	Class	Laps	Pos.	Class Pos.
1983	(Italy) Scuderia Sivama Motor Griffone	(Morocco) Max Cohen-Olivar (Argentina) Oscar Larrauri	Lancia LC1	Gr. C	218	NC	NC
1984	(Switzerland) Brun Motorsport	(France) Joël Gouhier (Argentina) Oscar Larrauri	Porsche 956	Gr. C1	335	7th	7th
1985	(Switzerland) Brun Motorsport	(Argentina) Oscar Larrauri (Italy) Gabriele Tarquini	Porsche 956	Gr. C1	323	DNF	DNF
1986	(Switzerland) Brun Motorsport	(Switzerland) Walter Brun (Germany) Frank Jelinski	Porsche 962C	Gr. C1	75	DNF	DNF
1988	(Switzerland) Repsol Brun Motorsport	(Spain) Jesús Pareja (Germany) Uwe Schäfer	Porsche 962C	C1	372	7th	7th
1990	(Switzerland) Brun Motorsport	(Norway) Harald Huysman (Switzerland) Bernard Santal	Porsche 962C	C1	335	10th	10th
1995	(United States) Euromotorsport Racing Inc.	(France) René Arnoux (United States) Jay Cochran	Ferrari 333 SP	WSC	7	DNF	DNF
