= Patrick Gonin =

French racing driver

Patrick Gonin (born 23 May 1957) is a retired French racing driver.

Gonin began his career in 1980 with an eighth place overall in the French Formula Renault Championship. In 1982, he entered the French Formula Three Championship, where he finished fourth in the championship behind Pierre Petit, Michel Ferté and François Hesnault.
