= Walter Brun =

Swiss racing driver (born 1942)

24 Hours of Le Mans career
- Years: 1971–2003
- Teams: Wicky Racing Team, GS-Tuning, Brun Motorsport, Chamberlain Engineering, Konrad Motorsport
- Best finish: 4th (1984)
- Class wins: 1 (1971)

Walter Brun (born 20 October 1942) is a Swiss former racing driver and founder of Brun Motorsport. He also co-founded the Formula One team EuroBrun with Giampaolo Pavanello.

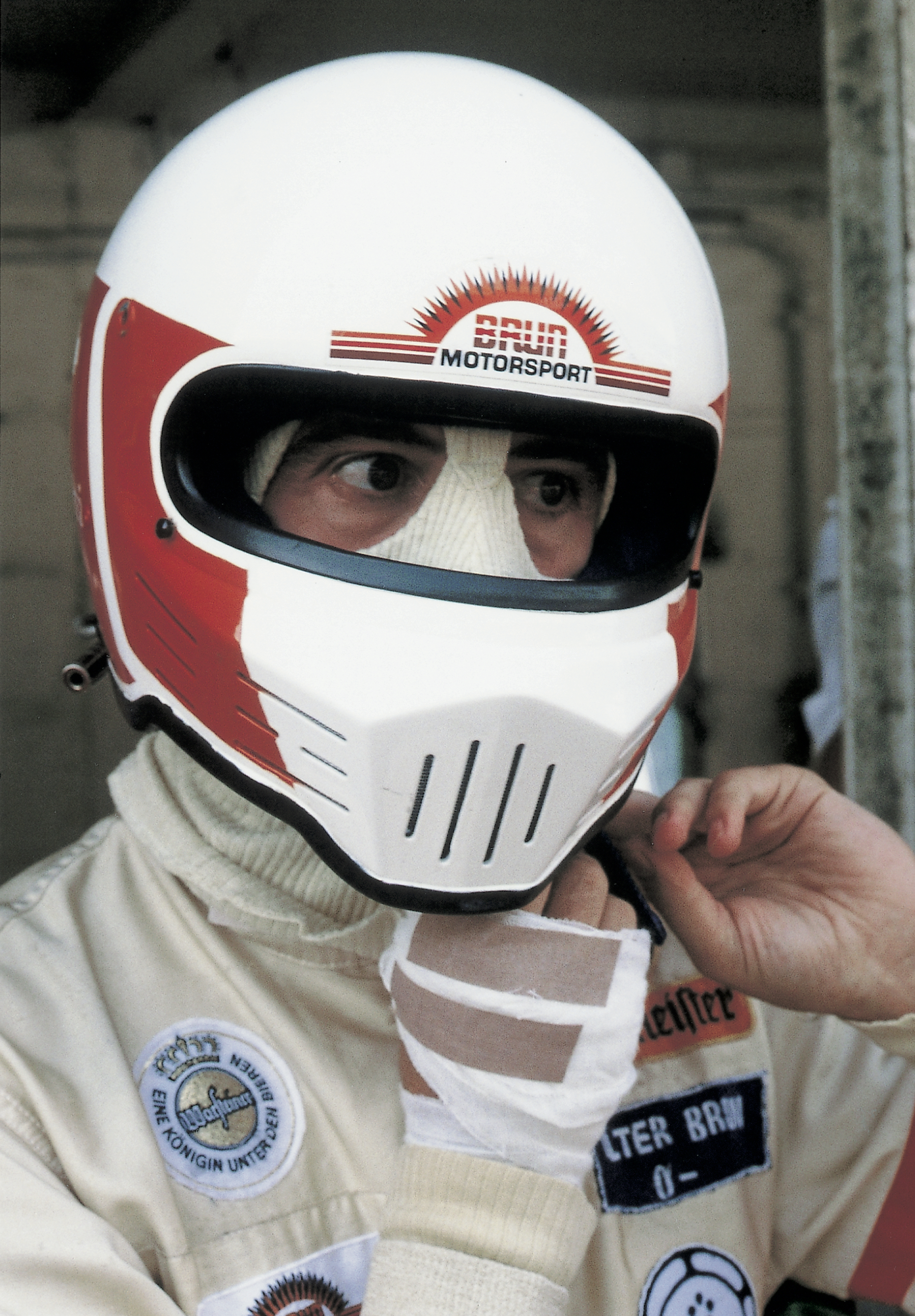
1984: Walter Brun 24h Le Mans

== Racing record ==
=== 24 Hours of Le Mans results ===
Year	Team	Co-drivers	Car	Class	Laps	Pos.	Class pos.
1971	(Switzerland) Wicky Racing Team	(Switzerland) Peter Mattli	Porsche 907	P 2.0	306	7th	**1st**
1972	(Switzerland) Wicky Racing Team	(Switzerland) Hervé Bayard (Switzerland) Peter Mattli	Porsche 907	S 2.0	252	18th	**2nd**
1973	(Switzerland) Wicky Racing Team	(Switzerland) Jean-Pierre Aeschlimann (Switzerland) Cox Kocher	BMW 3.0 CSL	TS 5.0	1	DNF	DNF
1982	(Germany) BASF Cassetten Team GS Sport	(Germany) Siegfried Müller Jr.	Sauber SHS C6-Cosworth	Gr.C	55	DNF	DNF
1984	(Switzerland) Brun Motorsport	(United States) Bob Akin (Germany) Prince Leopold von Bayern	Porsche 956B	C1	340	4th	4th
1985	(Switzerland) Brun Motorsport	(France) Joël Gouhier (Belgium) Didier Theys	Porsche 962C	C1	304	DNF	DNF
1986	(Switzerland) Brun Motorsport	(Germany) Frank Jelinski (Italy) Massimo Sigala	Porsche 962C	C1	75	DNF	DNF
1989	(Switzerland) Brun Motorsport	(Argentina) Oscar Larrauri (Spain) Jesús Pareja	Porsche 962C	C1	242	DNF	DNF
1990	(Switzerland) Brun Motorsport	(Argentina) Oscar Larrauri (Spain) Jesús Pareja	Porsche 962C	C1	353	DNF	DNF
1991	(Switzerland) Brun Motorsport	(Argentina) Oscar Larrauri (Spain) Jesús Pareja	Porsche 962C	C2	338	10th	10th
2000	(Japan) Team Goh	(Germany) Christian Gläsel (Switzerland) Toni Seiler	Chrysler Viper GTS-R	LMGTS	210	DNF	DNF
2001	(Germany) Konrad Motorsport	(Switzerland) Toni Seiler (United States) Charles Slater	Saleen S7-R	LMGTS	4	DNF	DNF
2002	(Germany) Konrad Motorsport	(United States) Rodney Mall (United States) Charles Slater	Saleen S7-R	LMGTS	83	DNF	DNF
2003	(Germany) Konrad Motorsport	(Austria) Franz Konrad (Switzerland) Toni Seiler	Saleen S7-R	GTS	91	DNF	DNF

=== Complete British Saloon Car Championship results ===
(key) (Races in bold indicate pole position; races in italics indicate fastest lap.)

Year	Team	Car	Class	1	2	3	4	5	6	7	8	9	Pos.	Pts	Class
1973	Herbert Müller Racing	BMW 3.0 CSL	D	BRH	SIL	THR	THR	SIL	ING	BRH	SIL; 7	BRH	46th	3	7th

== Bibliography ==
- Thomas Nehlert, Eckhard Schimpf, Peter Wyss & Sacha Brun (November 2022). Brun Motorsport 1966–2009 – Limited Edition. Sportfahrer Verlag. ISBN 978-3945390115.
