= Brun Motorsport =

Defunct Swiss auto racing team

(Switzerland) Brun Motorsport
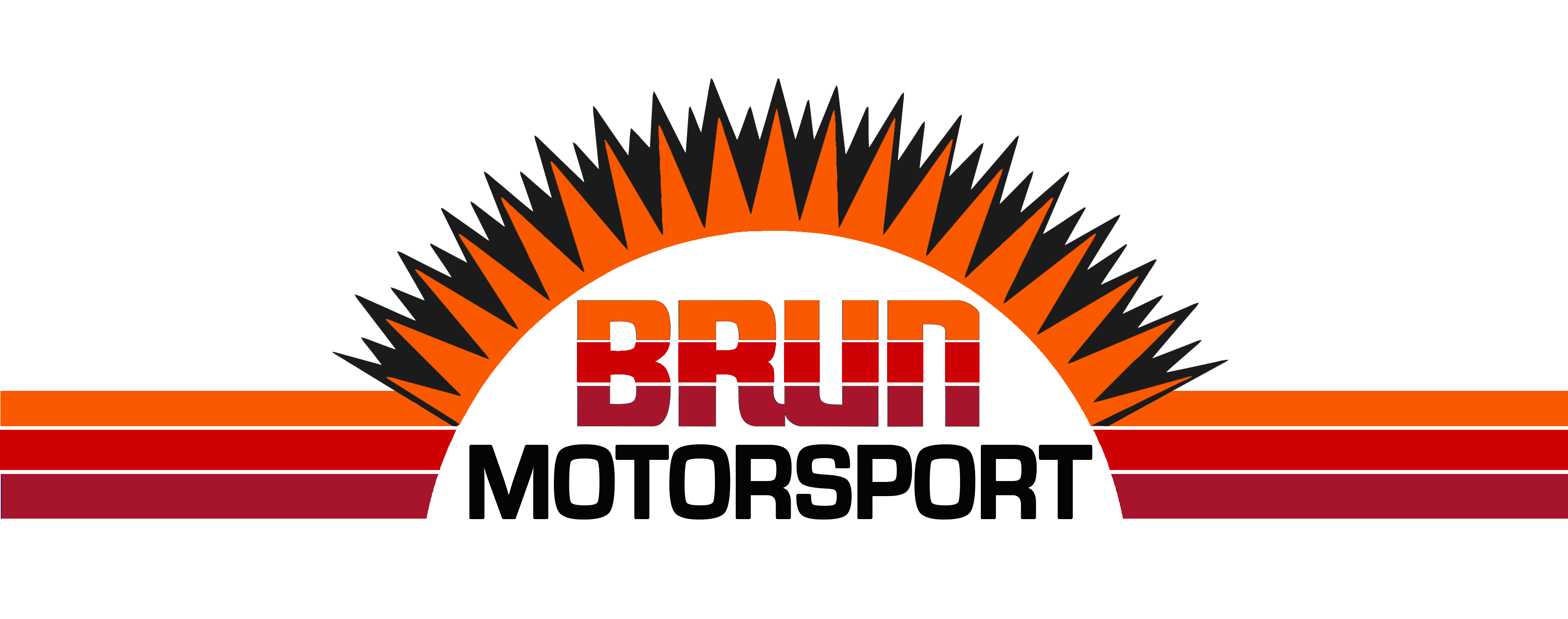
- Founded: 1983
- Founder(s): Walter Brun
- Folded: 1992
- Former series: World Sportscar Championship; Deutsche Rennsport Meisterschaft; Interserie; IMSA GT Championship; ADAC Supercup; All Japan Sports Prototype Championship; BMW M1 Procar Championship
- Noted drivers: (Switzerland) Walter Brun (Germany) Stefan Bellof (Argentina) Oscar Larrauri (Belgium) Thierry Boutsen (Germany) Hans-Joachim Stuck (Spain) Jesus Pareja (Germany) Frank Jelinski (Italy) Massimo Sigala
- Teams' Championships: World Sports Prototype Championship: 1986
- Drivers' Championships: Deutsche Rennsport Meisterschaft: 1984: Stefan Bellof; World Sports Prototype Championship: 1984: Stefan Bellof; 1986: Derek Bell
- Website: https://www.brun-motorsport.com/

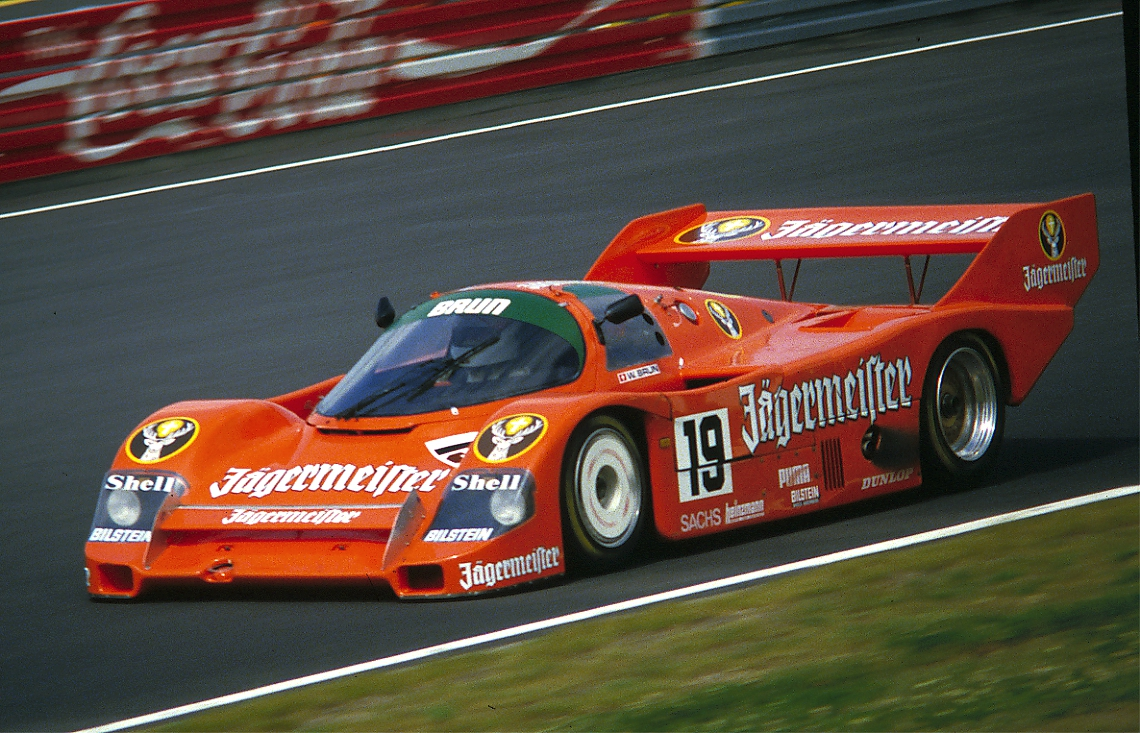
A Porsche 956 run by Brun Motorsport at the Nürburgring.

Brun Motorsport GmbH was a Swiss auto racing team founded by driver Walter Brun in 1983. They competed as a Porsche privateer team in sports car racing for their entire existence, running in a multitude of international championships. They notably won the World Sportscar Championship in 1986 and later became a full-fledged chassis constructor. Brun was also briefly part of the EuroBrun Formula One team from 1988 to 1990. The team was eventually dissolved in 1992.

== Racing history ==
=== 1983 – 1984 ===
Following several years of competing for Team GS-Sport and their partner Sauber in the World Sportscar Championship (WSC) and Deutsche Rennsport Meisterschaft (DRM), Walter Brun took over the ailing GS-Sport company and renamed it Brun Motorsport for the 1983 season. Brun initially took over GS-Sport's BMW M1s and a Sauber SHS C6, modifying the later into what became known as the Sehcar C6. The new team also kept Hans Joachim Stuck and Harald Grohs as their drivers, with Walter Brun himself also doing driving duties.

Following initial problems with the Sehcar, Brun became one of the early privateer owners of a Porsche 956, which was used in both the World Sportscar Championship and Deutsche Rennsport Meisterschaft. The 956 immediately boosted Brun's performance, as the team quickly took their first victory that season at an Interserie event at Autodrom Most with Walter Brun driving. This was followed by a fourth place at the 1000 km Spa.

Abandoning the Sehcar project for 1984, a second 956 was purchased by the team, being used mainly by drivers Massimo Sigala and Oscar Larrauri. The team also added sponsorship from Jägermeister and Warsteiner. Running their first full seasons of the WSC and DRM with the 956s, Brun continued to improve their performances as the season progressed. The season opened with a fourth at the 1000 km Monza, followed by fourth and seventh places finishes at the 24 Hours of Le Mans, and third and fourth at the 1000 km Spa. The team achieved their second victory ever at the 1000 km Imola, which was followed a week later by a victory at a DRM round at the Nürburgring, and then once more a month later at the same circuit for an Interserie event. Brun secured their first championship by winning the DRM teams title, while Stefan Bellof won the drivers' championship, having run for both Brun and Joest Racing.

=== 1985 – 1987 ===
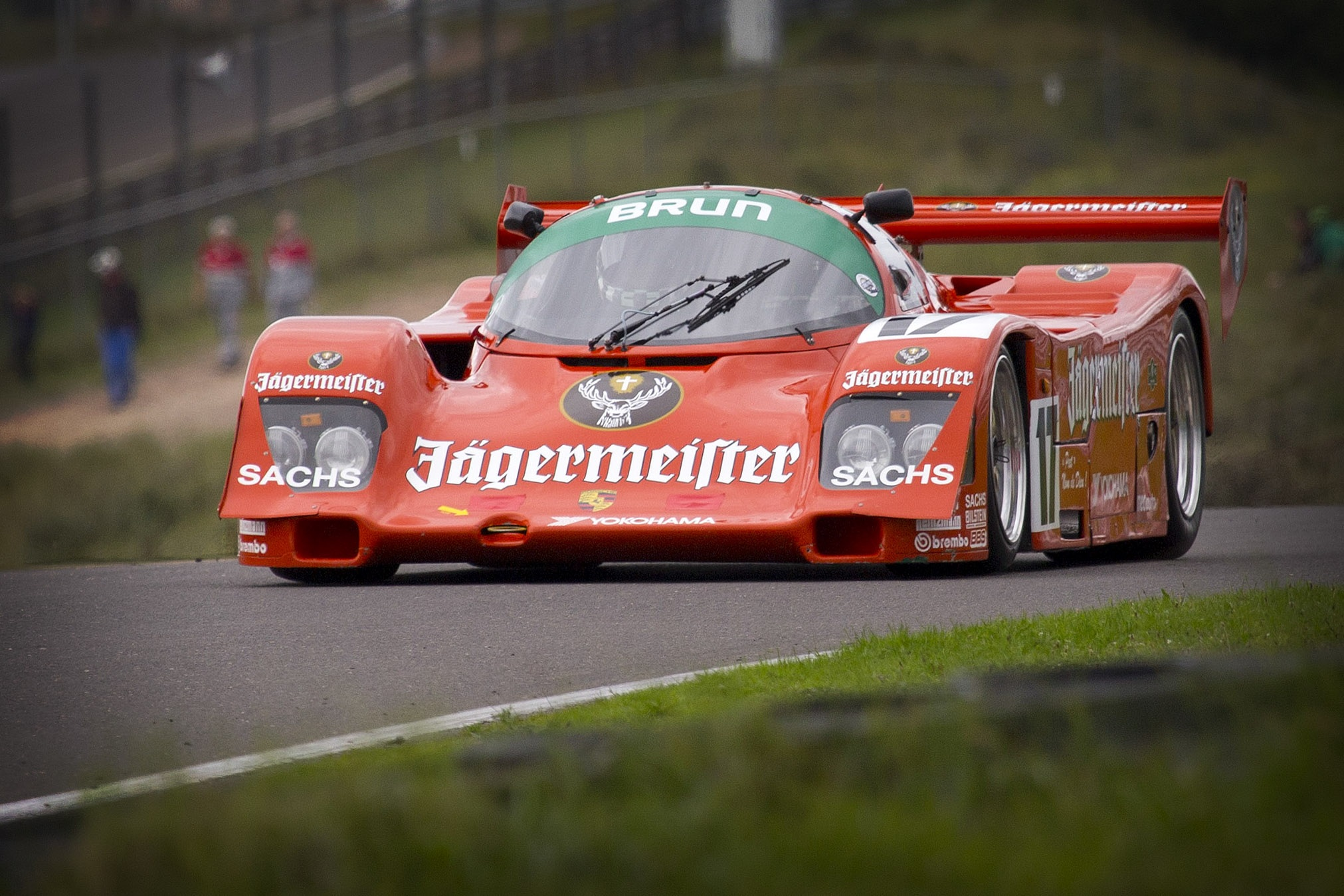
A Porsche 962C in Brun Motorsport's Jägermeister livery

For 1985, Brun added a new Porsche 962C to his fleet of two 956s. The team began to dominate in the combined Interserie-DRM series, taking five victories and earning Hans Joachim Stuck second in the drivers' championship behind Joest Racing's Jochen Mass. However, the team remained winless in the World Championship. Even though the team scored a third at Mugello and a second at Hockenheimring, the team struggled to finish many events, leaving them sixth in the team's championship. The team suffered a further loss as Stefan Bellof was killed during the season in an accident while driving for the team at the 1000 km of Spa.

Building on the team's success in 1985, Walter Brun began to expand his team even further for 1986. Two more 962s were purchased, with one being dedicated solely to competing in select rounds of the North American IMSA GT Championship. Although only running five rounds, the team managed to finish second at Watkins Glen behind champion Al Holbert. Back in Europe, Brun rebounded in the World Championship. After failing to finish Le Mans the previous year, the team earned a second place result. The first victory of the season came at Jerez and was followed by another at Spa. Although Brun only scored championship points in four rounds, with only one victory counting for points, the team was still able to win the teams' championship that year, defeating the factory Jaguar and Porsche teams. Brun closed off the successful year with one final victory at the Interserie round at the Österreichring.

Success came quickly in 1987, as Brun opened the year with a second-place finish at the 24 Hours of Daytona. However, Jaguar became the dominant team in the World Championship, while the German Supercup became a struggle for Brun. This left the team with their first winless season ever, even though there were some strong performances over the year. Consistent finishes in the World Championship were not enough for Brun to defend their title, yet the team finished in second, ahead of a plethora of Porsche teams.

=== 1988 – 1991 ===
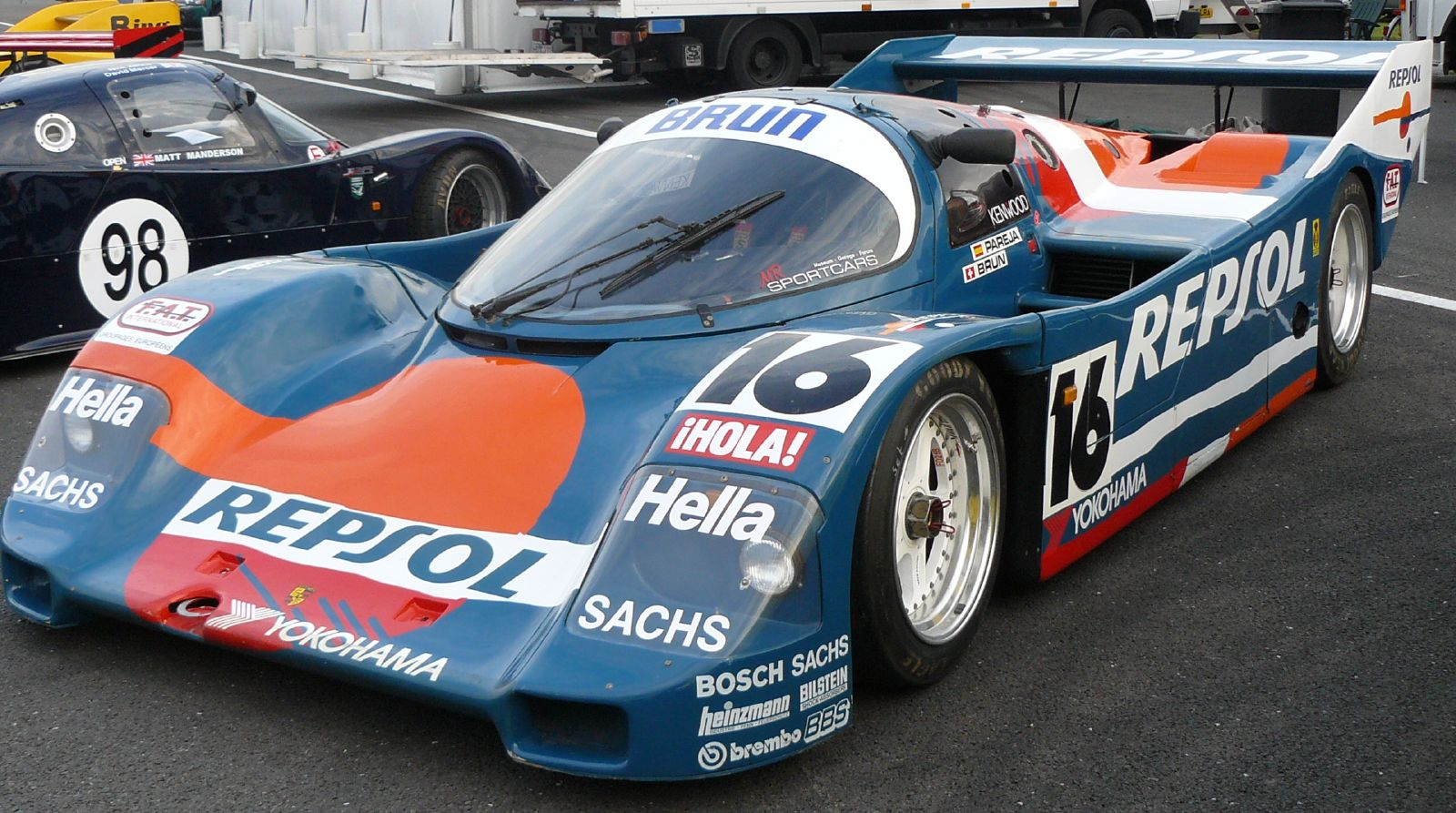
A Brun 962 sponsored by primary backers Repsol and Yokohama.

With their great success and hoping to aid their driver Oscar Larrauri move into Formula One, Brun joined with Euroracing to form the EuroBrun team. Although Walter Brun provided a large amount of monetary investment, the team was run more by the Euroracing side. The team struggled and Brun's concentration on the Formula One squad hurt their efforts in sports cars. Even with the aid of new sponsor Repsol, the team managed only a lone victory at an Interserie event. Brun would slip to fourth in the World Championship as Mercedes-Benz would join Jaguar at the top.

The EuroBrun effort downsized for 1989, leaving Walter Brun to attempt to regroup in sports cars. Following a third at the 24 Hours of Daytona, Brun would abandon their small IMSA GT concern and instead moved to the All Japan Sports Prototype Championship, where they also scored a third on their debut. In the World Championship, even though Brun struggled to score podium finishes, the team was able to earn consistent points and eventually finish third in the championship, beating Jaguar as well as newcomers Nissan, Toyota and Aston Martin.

As EuroBrun continued to drain funds and the Supercup championship was dissolved, the team was downsized in 1990. The Japanese effort was cancelled, and the team was left to concentrate almost solely on the World Championship. Even with a more concentrated effort, the team struggled to even finish in the top ten. A fifth place at Spa was their best effort all year, as the team now slipped to seventh in the championship standings.

Following the 1990 season, the EuroBrun team was finally dissolved. At the same time, the World Championship was beginning to phase in new regulations which would leave the 962s that Brun campaigned ineligible starting in 1992, and Porsche planned no replacement for the cars. Instead of opting to purchase a customer car from another manufacturer, Brun decided to use expertise gained from their stint in Formula One to develop their own car. The funding for this project, known as the Brun C91, forced Brun to run solely in the World Championship. The team was able to improve on the previous year by gaining top ten finishes in nearly every race, but struggling to get both cars to finish. When the C91 eventually debuted halfway through the season, the car was a disaster which failed to complete any races it entered. The team finished ninth in the championship.

Brun initially promised that the C91 would be better prepared for the 1992 season. However the financial strain of the EuroBrun team, the C91 project and a lack of results to attract sponsorship became too much, and Brun Motorsport closed before the 1992 season. Walter Brun continued racing for many years, as well as assisting RWS Motorsport and Konrad Motorsport.

== Constructor history ==
Walter Brun developed cars throughout the entire history of Brun Motorsport, although only one bore his name. At the time of the formation of Brun Motorsport, the former Team GS-Sport Sauber SHS C6 was retained by the new team. Brun believed that the car had potential in the C2 class and therefore modified his chassis to adapt a Ford Cosworth V8. Problems with the car eventually led Brun to replace the Ford Cosworth with a turbocharged version of the BMW unit that Sauber had initially used. The car was however considered too difficult to continue, and Brun opted instead to purchase a Porsche 956.

Later, after many years of experience and success with the 956 and later 962, Brun was forced to attempt to catch up to major manufacturers like Jaguar and Mercedes-Benz. Attempting to improve on the 962 platform, Brun began development of their own chassis in 1987. Attempting to overcome the flexing problems that had plagued the factory 962s, these new cars had a monocoque built by Brun and were then assembled with standard 962 parts. Eight of these cars were built in total, with a few sold to other teams while the rest joined Brun's fleet of existing 962s.

Brun's largest project was the development of the Brun C91 in 1991, in preparation for the 1992 regulation changes. The car was a fresh design, using many elements from the Peugeot 905, Mercedes-Benz C291, and Jaguar XJR-14 such as a large double rear wing and low bodywork dominated by a tall cockpit. With the new regulations banning the turbocharged Porsche flat six, Brun required a naturally aspirated engine that was on par with Formula One technology. Using elements of the EuroBrun team, Brun turned to the same team that had supplied engines to the Formula One outfit: Judd. EuroBrun had initially used the outdated Judd CV V8, but Brun was able to get funding for the new EV V8. The car however suffered mechanical woes from its debut halfway through the 1991 season, and the team never managed to come to terms with the car before funding eventually ran out.

== Bibliography ==
- Thomas Nehlert, Eckhard Schimpf, Peter Wyss & Sacha Brun (November 2022). Brun Motorsport 1966–2009 – Limited Edition. Sportfahrer Verlag. ISBN 978-3945390115.
