= 1991 430 km of Nürburgring =

Sports car endurance race in Germany

Nürburgring (1984–1994)

The 1991 430 km of Nürburgring was the fifth round of the 1991 World Sportscar Championship season, taking place at Nürburgring, Germany. It took place on August 18, 1991. The two Jaguars finished six laps ahead of the third-placed Porsche.

== Qualifying ==
=== Qualifying results ===
Class leaders are in bold. The fastest time set by each entry is denoted in gray.

Pos.	Class	No.	Team	Qualifying 1	Qualifying 2	Gap	Grid
1	C1	4	**(United Kingdom) Silk Cut Jaguar**	**1:20.835**	**1:19.519**		1
2	C1	3	(United Kingdom) Silk Cut Jaguar	1:21.305	1:19.958	+0.439	2
3	C1	6	(France) Peugeot Talbot Sport	1:21.469	1:20.388	+0.869	3
4	C1	5	(France) Peugeot Talbot Sport	1:21.211	1:20.412	+0.893	4
5	C1	2	(Germany) Team Sauber Mercedes	1:21.266	1:22.109	+1.747	5
6	C1	1	(Germany) Team Sauber Mercedes	1:22.513	1:22.510	+2.991	6
7	C2	11	**(Germany) Porsche Kremer Racing**	**1:25.392**	**1:25.024**	+5.505	9
8	C1	8	(Netherlands) Euro Racing	1:25.661	1:34.050	+6.142	7
9	C2	59	(Switzerland) Team Salamin Primagaz	1:28.720	1:27.856	+8.337	10
10	C2	17	(Switzerland) Repsol Brun Motorsport	1:29.393	1:28.260	+8.741	11
11	C2	12	(France) Courage Compétition	1:29.104	1:28.507	+8.988	12
12	C2	55	(Germany) Porsche Kremer Racing	1:28.971	1:28.753	+9.234	13
13	C2	18	(Japan) Mazdaspeed	1:50.599	1:28.961	+9.442	14
14	C2	13	(France) Courage Compétition	1:31.866	1:29.533	+10.014	15
15	C2	16	(Switzerland) Repsol Brun Motorsport	1:29.872	No Time	+10.353	DNS
16	C2	57	(Austria) Konrad Motorsport	1:32.486	1:31.650	+12.131	16
17	C1	7	(France) Louis Descartes	1:32.638	1:32.720	+13.119	6
18	C2	14	(Switzerland) Team Salamin Primagaz	1:35.370	1:34.448	+14.929	17
19	C2	15	(Italy) Veneto Equipe SRL	No Time	1:36.551	+17.032	18
20	C2	21	(Austria) Konrad Motorsport	No Time	1:28:06.104	+	DNQ

== Race ==
=== Race results ===
Class winners in bold. Cars failing to complete 90% of the winner's distance marked as Not Classified (NC).

Pos	Class	No	Team	Drivers	Chassis	Tyre	Laps
Pos	Class	No	Team	Drivers	Engine	Tyre	Laps
1	**C1**	**3**	**(United Kingdom) Silk Cut Jaguar**	**(United Kingdom) Derek Warwick (Australia) David Brabham**	**Jaguar XJR-14**	G	**95**
1	**C1**	**3**	**(United Kingdom) Silk Cut Jaguar**	**(United Kingdom) Derek Warwick (Australia) David Brabham**	**Cosworth HB 3.5L V8**	G	**95**
2	C1	4	(United Kingdom) Silk Cut Jaguar	(Italy) Teo Fabi (Australia) David Brabham	Jaguar XJR-14	G	95
2	C1	4	(United Kingdom) Silk Cut Jaguar	(Italy) Teo Fabi (Australia) David Brabham	Cosworth HB 3.5L V8	G	95
3	**C2**	**11**	**(Germany) Porsche Kremer Racing**	**(Germany) Manuel Reuter (Finland) Harri Toivonen**	**Porsche 962CK6**	Y	**89**
3	**C2**	**11**	**(Germany) Porsche Kremer Racing**	**(Germany) Manuel Reuter (Finland) Harri Toivonen**	**Porsche Type-935 3.2L Turbo Flat-6**	Y	**89**
4	C2	59	(Switzerland) Team Salamin Primagaz (Germany) Obermaier Racing	(Germany) Jürgen Oppermann (Germany) Otto Altenbach	Porsche 962C	G	89
4	C2	59	(Switzerland) Team Salamin Primagaz (Germany) Obermaier Racing	(Germany) Jürgen Oppermann (Germany) Otto Altenbach	Porsche Type-935 3.2L Turbo Flat-6	G	89
5	C2	18	(Japan) Mazdaspeed	(Republic of Ireland) David Kennedy (Brazil) Maurizio Sandro Sala	Mazda 787	D	89
5	C2	18	(Japan) Mazdaspeed	(Republic of Ireland) David Kennedy (Brazil) Maurizio Sandro Sala	Mazda R26B 2.6L 4-Rotor	D	89
6	C2	12	(France) Courage Compétition	(France) Lionel Robert (France) François Migault	Cougar C26S	G	89
6	C2	12	(France) Courage Compétition	(France) Lionel Robert (France) François Migault	Porsche Type-935 3.2L Turbo Flat-6	G	89
7	C2	17	(Switzerland) Repsol Brun Motorsport	(Switzerland) Walter Brun (Spain) Jesús Pareja	Porsche 962C	Y	88
7	C2	17	(Switzerland) Repsol Brun Motorsport	(Switzerland) Walter Brun (Spain) Jesús Pareja	Porsche Type-935 3.2L Turbo Flat-6	Y	88
8	C2	55	(Germany) Porsche Kremer Racing	(Germany) Otto Rensing (Austria) Mercedes Stermitz	Porsche 962CK6	Y	87
8	C2	55	(Germany) Porsche Kremer Racing	(Germany) Otto Rensing (Austria) Mercedes Stermitz	Porsche Type-935 3.2L Turbo Flat-6	Y	87
9	C2	57	(Austria) Konrad Motorsport	(Austria) Franz Konrad (Germany) Harald Becker	Porsche 962C	G	87
9	C2	57	(Austria) Konrad Motorsport	(Austria) Franz Konrad (Germany) Harald Becker	Porsche Type-935 3.2L Turbo Flat-6	G	87
10 NC	C2	14	(Switzerland) Team Salamin Primagaz	(Switzerland) Antoine Salamin (France) Pierre Yver	Porsche 962C	G	84
10 NC	C2	14	(Switzerland) Team Salamin Primagaz	(Switzerland) Antoine Salamin (France) Pierre Yver	Porsche Type-935 3.2L Turbo Flat-6	G	84
11 DNF	C1	5	(France) Peugeot Talbot Sport	(Italy) Mauro Baldi (France) Philippe Alliot	Peugeot 905	MI	56
11 DNF	C1	5	(France) Peugeot Talbot Sport	(Italy) Mauro Baldi (France) Philippe Alliot	Peugeot SA35 3.5L V10	MI	56
12 DNF	C1	8	(Netherlands) Euro Racing	(Netherlands) Cor Euser (Netherlands) Charles Zwolsman	Spice SE90C	G	47
12 DNF	C1	8	(Netherlands) Euro Racing	(Netherlands) Cor Euser (Netherlands) Charles Zwolsman	Ford Cosworth DFR 3.5L V8	G	47
13 DNF	C1	7	(France) Louis Descartes (United Kingdom) Berkeley Team London	(Italy) Ranieri Randaccio (Italy) Mirko Savoldi	Spice SE89C	G	43
13 DNF	C1	7	(France) Louis Descartes (United Kingdom) Berkeley Team London	(Italy) Ranieri Randaccio (Italy) Mirko Savoldi	Ford Cosworth DFZ 3.5L V8	G	43
14 DNF	C1	1	(Germany) Team Sauber Mercedes	(Germany) Jochen Mass (France) Jean-Louis Schlesser	Mercedes-Benz C291	G	28
14 DNF	C1	1	(Germany) Team Sauber Mercedes	(Germany) Jochen Mass (France) Jean-Louis Schlesser	Mercedes-Benz M291 3.5L Flat-12	G	28
15 DNF	C1	2	(Germany) Team Sauber Mercedes	(Austria) Karl Wendlinger (Germany) Michael Schumacher	Mercedes-Benz C291	G	10
15 DNF	C1	2	(Germany) Team Sauber Mercedes	(Austria) Karl Wendlinger (Germany) Michael Schumacher	Mercedes-Benz M291 3.5L Flat-12	G	10
16 DNF	C2	15	(Italy) Veneto Equipe SRL	(Italy) Almo Coppelli	Lancia LC2	D	10
16 DNF	C2	15	(Italy) Veneto Equipe SRL	(Italy) Almo Coppelli	Ferrari 308C 3.0L Turbo V8	D	10
17 DNF	C1	6	(France) Peugeot Talbot Sport	(Finland) Keke Rosberg (France) Yannick Dalmas	Peugeot 905	MI	8
17 DNF	C1	6	(France) Peugeot Talbot Sport	(Finland) Keke Rosberg (France) Yannick Dalmas	Peugeot SA35 3.5L V10	MI	8
18 DNF	C2	13	(France) Courage Compétition	(Italy) Marco Brand (Italy) Andrea Filippini	Cougar C26S	G	6
18 DNF	C2	13	(France) Courage Compétition	(Italy) Marco Brand (Italy) Andrea Filippini	Porsche Type-935 3.2L Turbo Flat-6	G	6
DNS	C1	16	(Switzerland) Repsol Brun Motorsport	(Argentina) Oscar Larrauri (Switzerland) Gregor Foitek	Brun C91	Y	-
DNS	C1	16	(Switzerland) Repsol Brun Motorsport	(Argentina) Oscar Larrauri (Switzerland) Gregor Foitek	Judd EV 3.5L V8	Y	-
DNQ	C1	21	(Austria) Konrad Motorsport	(Austria) Franz Konrad (Sweden) Stefan Johansson	Konrad KM-011	Y	-
DNQ	C1	21	(Austria) Konrad Motorsport	(Austria) Franz Konrad (Sweden) Stefan Johansson	Lamborghini 3512 3.5L V12	Y	-

== Statistics ==
- Pole Position - Teo Fabi (#4 Silk Cut Jaguar) - 1:19.519
- Fastest Lap - Teo Fabi (#4 Silk Cut Jaguar) - 1:21.553
- Average Speed - 180.183 km/h

World Sportscar Championship
Previous race: 1991 24 Hours of Le Mans	1991 season	Next race: 1991 430 km of Magny-Cours
