= 1991 430 km of Monza =

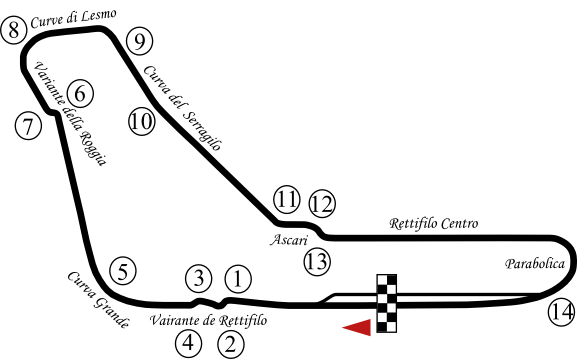
Layout of the Autodromo Nazionale di Monza (1976-1993)

The 1991 430 km of Monza was the second round of the 1991 World Sportscar Championship season, taking place at Autodromo Nazionale Monza, Italy. It took place on May 5, 1991.

== Qualifying ==
=== Qualifying results ===
Class leaders are in bold. The fastest time set by each entry is denoted in gray.

Pos.	Class	No.	Team	Qualifying 1	Qualifying 2	Gap	Grid
1	C1	4	**(United Kingdom) Silk Cut Jaguar**	**1:33.672**	1:48.191		1
2	C1	3	(United Kingdom) Silk Cut Jaguar	1:34.027	**1:44.052**	+0.355	2
3	C2	16	**(Switzerland) Repsol Brun Motorsport**	**1:37.853**	1:52.934	+4.181	7
4	C1	5	(France) Peugeot Talbot Sport	1:38.040	1:48.486	+4.368	3
5	C2	1	(Germany) Team Sauber Mercedes	1:38.096	**1:50.398**	+4.424	8
6	C1	6	(France) Peugeot Talbot Sport	1:38.954	1:49.693	+5.282	4
7	C1	8	(Netherlands) Euro Racing	1:40.143	1:50.087	+6.471	5
8	C1	2	(Germany) Team Sauber Mercedes	1:40.555	1:55.343	+6.883	6
9	C2	11	(Germany) Porsche Kremer Racing	1:40.720	1:54.694	+7.018	9
10	C2	18	(Japan) Mazdaspeed	1:48.600	1:56.810	+14.928	10
11	C2	13	(France) Courage Compétition	1:49.273	1:59.929	+15.601	11
12	C2	21	(Austria) Konrad Motorsport	1:50.067	1:59.419	+16.395	12
13	C2	15	(Italy) Veneto Equipe SRL	1:51.190	2:22.497	+17.518	13
14	C2	12	(France) Courage Compétition	1:51.532	1:59.659	+17.860	14
15	C2	14	(Switzerland) Team Salamin Primagaz	1:52.475	No Time	+18.803	15
16	C2	17	(Switzerland) Repsol Brun Motorsport	1:53.205	2:08.382	+19.533	16
17	C1	7	(France) Louis Descartes	1:57.062	2:06.600	+23.390	17

== Race ==
=== Race results ===
Class winners in bold. Cars failing to complete 90% of the winner's distance marked as Not Classified (NC).

Pos	Class	No	Team	Drivers	Chassis	Tyre	Laps
Pos	Class	No	Team	Drivers	Engine	Tyre	Laps
1	**C1**	**3**	**(United Kingdom) Silk Cut Jaguar**	**(United Kingdom) Derek Warwick (United Kingdom) Martin Brundle**	**Jaguar XJR-14**	G	**75**
1	**C1**	**3**	**(United Kingdom) Silk Cut Jaguar**	**(United Kingdom) Derek Warwick (United Kingdom) Martin Brundle**	**Cosworth HB 3.5L V8**	G	**75**
2	C1	4	(United Kingdom) Silk Cut Jaguar	(Italy) Teo Fabi (United Kingdom) Martin Brundle	Jaguar XJR-14	G	74
2	C1	4	(United Kingdom) Silk Cut Jaguar	(Italy) Teo Fabi (United Kingdom) Martin Brundle	Cosworth HB 3.5L V8	G	74
3	**C2**	**1**	**(Germany) Team Sauber Mercedes**	**(Germany) Jochen Mass (France) Jean-Louis Schlesser**	**Mercedes-Benz C11**	G	**73**
3	**C2**	**1**	**(Germany) Team Sauber Mercedes**	**(Germany) Jochen Mass (France) Jean-Louis Schlesser**	**Mercedes-Benz M119 5.0L Turbo V8**	G	**73**
4	C1	8	(Netherlands) Euro Racing	(Netherlands) Cor Euser (Netherlands) Charles Zwolsman	Spice SE90C	G	71
4	C1	8	(Netherlands) Euro Racing	(Netherlands) Cor Euser (Netherlands) Charles Zwolsman	Ford Cosworth DFR 3.5L V8	G	71
5	C2	11	(Germany) Porsche Kremer Racing	(Germany) Manuel Reuter (Finland) Harri Toivonen	Porsche 962CK6	Y	71
5	C2	11	(Germany) Porsche Kremer Racing	(Germany) Manuel Reuter (Finland) Harri Toivonen	Porsche Type-935 3.2L Turbo Flat-6	Y	71
6	C2	16	(Switzerland) Repsol Brun Motorsport	(Italy) Massimo Sigala (Argentina) Oscar Larrauri	Porsche 962C	Y	69
6	C2	16	(Switzerland) Repsol Brun Motorsport	(Italy) Massimo Sigala (Argentina) Oscar Larrauri	Porsche Type-935 3.2L Turbo Flat-6	Y	69
7	C2	18	(Japan) Mazdaspeed	(Brazil) Maurizio Sandro Sala (Belgium) Pierre Dieudonné	Mazda 787	D	69
7	C2	18	(Japan) Mazdaspeed	(Brazil) Maurizio Sandro Sala (Belgium) Pierre Dieudonné	Mazda R26B 2.6L 4-Rotor	D	69
8	C1	5	(France) Peugeot Talbot Sport	(Italy) Mauro Baldi (France) Philippe Alliot	Peugeot 905	MI	69
8	C1	5	(France) Peugeot Talbot Sport	(Italy) Mauro Baldi (France) Philippe Alliot	Peugeot SA35 3.5L V10	MI	69
9	C2	12	(France) Courage Compétition	(France) Lionel Robert (France) François Migault	Cougar C26S	G	68
9	C2	12	(France) Courage Compétition	(France) Lionel Robert (France) François Migault	Porsche Type-935 3.2L Turbo Flat-6	G	68
10	C2	13	(France) Courage Compétition	(France) Michel Trollé (Canada) Claude Bourbonnais	Cougar C26S	G	67
10	C2	13	(France) Courage Compétition	(France) Michel Trollé (Canada) Claude Bourbonnais	Porsche Type-935 3.2L Turbo Flat-6	G	67
11 DNF	C1	6	(France) Peugeot Talbot Sport	(Finland) Keke Rosberg (France) Yannick Dalmas	Peugeot 905	MI	64
11 DNF	C1	6	(France) Peugeot Talbot Sport	(Finland) Keke Rosberg (France) Yannick Dalmas	Peugeot SA35 3.5L V10	MI	64
12 DNF	C2	17	(Switzerland) Repsol Brun Motorsport	(Spain) Jesús Pareja (Switzerland) Walter Brun	Porsche 962C	Y	39
12 DNF	C2	17	(Switzerland) Repsol Brun Motorsport	(Spain) Jesús Pareja (Switzerland) Walter Brun	Porsche Type-935 3.0L Turbo Flat-6	Y	39
13 DNF	C1	7	(France) Louis Descartes	(France) Philippe de Henning (Italy) Luigi Taverna	ALD C91	G	30
13 DNF	C1	7	(France) Louis Descartes	(France) Philippe de Henning (Italy) Luigi Taverna	Ford Cosworth DFR 3.5L V8	G	30
14 DNF	C1	2	(Germany) Team Sauber Mercedes	(Austria) Karl Wendlinger (Germany) Michael Schumacher	Mercedes-Benz C291	G	20
14 DNF	C1	2	(Germany) Team Sauber Mercedes	(Austria) Karl Wendlinger (Germany) Michael Schumacher	Mercedes-Benz M291 3.5L Flat-12	G	20
15 DNF	C2	14	(Switzerland) Team Salamin Primagaz	(Switzerland) Antoine Salamin (Morocco) Max Cohen-Olivar	Porsche 962C	G	15
15 DNF	C2	14	(Switzerland) Team Salamin Primagaz	(Switzerland) Antoine Salamin (Morocco) Max Cohen-Olivar	Porsche Type-935 3.0L Turbo Flat-6	G	15
16 DNF	C2	21	(Austria) Konrad Motorsport	(Austria) Franz Konrad (Sweden) Stefan Johansson	Porsche 962C	G	14
16 DNF	C2	21	(Austria) Konrad Motorsport	(Austria) Franz Konrad (Sweden) Stefan Johansson	Porsche Type-935 3.2L Turbo Flat-6	G	14
17 DNF	C2	15	(Italy) Veneto Equipe SRL	(Italy) Marco Brand (Italy) Andrea Filipinni	Lancia LC2	D	12
17 DNF	C2	15	(Italy) Veneto Equipe SRL	(Italy) Marco Brand (Italy) Andrea Filipinni	Ferrari 308C 3.0L Turbo V8	D	12

== Statistics ==
- Pole Position - Teo Fabi (#4 Silk Cut Jaguar) - 1:33.672
- Fastest Lap - Martin Brundle (#4 Silk Cut Jaguar) - 1:29.182
- Average Speed - 207.614 km/h

World Sportscar Championship
Previous race: 1991 430 km of Suzuka	1991 season	Next race: 1991 430 km of Silverstone
