= 1991 430 km of Silverstone =

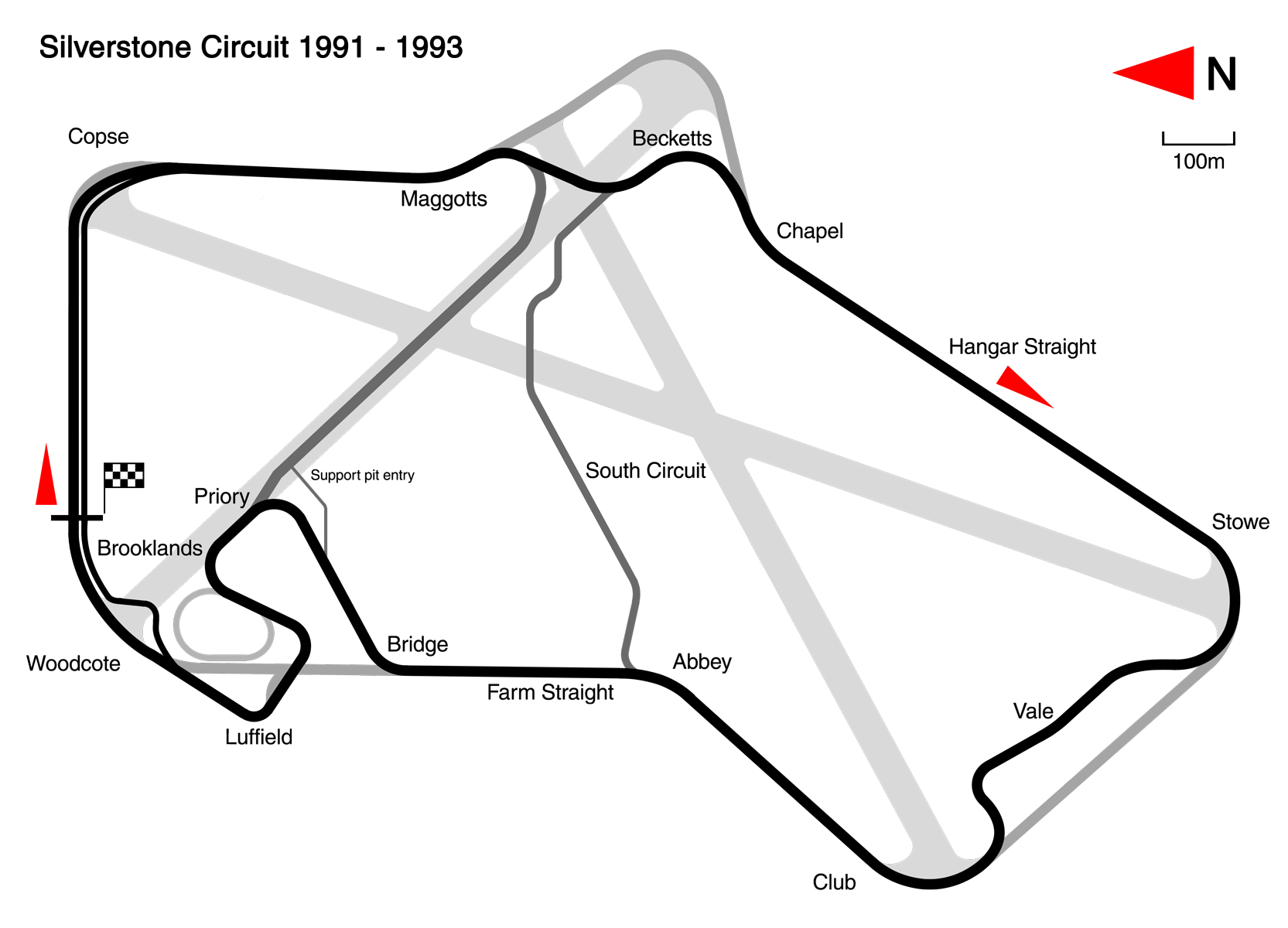
Map of the Silverstone Circuit (1991–1993)

The 1991 430 km of Silverstone was the third round of the 1991 World Sportscar Championship season, taking place at Silverstone Circuit, United Kingdom. It took place on 19 May 1991.

== Qualifying ==
=== Qualifying results ===
Class leaders are in bold. The fastest time set by each entry is denoted in gray.

Pos.	Class	No.	Team	Qualifying 1	Qualifying 2	Gap	Grid
1	C1	4	**(United Kingdom) Silk Cut Jaguar**	**1:34.989**	**1:27.478**		1
2	C1	3	(United Kingdom) Silk Cut Jaguar	1:37.020	1:27.516	+0.038	2
3	C1	5	(France) Peugeot Talbot Sport	1:43.202	1:31.236	+3.758	3
4	C1	6	(France) Peugeot Talbot Sport	1:41.100	1:31.431	+3.953	4
5	C1	2	(Germany) Team Sauber Mercedes	1:40.769	1:31.476	+3.998	5
6	C2	1	**(Germany) Team Sauber Mercedes**	**1:42.055**	**1:32.117**	+4.639	7
7	C1	8	(Netherlands) Euro Racing	1:50.204	1:36.738	+9.260	6
8	C2	11	(Germany) Porsche Kremer Racing	1:46.196	1:36.769	+9.291	8
9	C2	16	(Switzerland) Repsol Brun Motorsport	1:43.135	1:36.904	+9.426	9
10	C2	18	(Japan) Mazdaspeed	1:49.414	1:37.326	+9.848	10
11	C2	17	(Switzerland) Repsol Brun Motorsport	1:50.155	1:38.126	+10.648	11
12	C2	13	(France) Courage Compétition	1:56.018	1:39.308	+11.830	12
13	C2	21	(Austria) Konrad Motorsport	1:56.594	1:39.688	+12.210	13
14	C2	59	(Switzerland) Team Salamin Primagaz	1:58.250	1:40.147	+12.669	14
15	C2	12	(France) Courage Compétition	1:56.495	1:40.312	+12.834	15
16	C2	14	(Switzerland) Team Salamin Primagaz	2:03.045	1:45.136	+17.658	16
17	C1	60	(France) Louis Descartes	1:58.678	1:47.460	+19.982	DNS
18	C1	7	(France) Louis Descartes	2:16.914	No Time	+49.436	DNQ

== Race ==
=== Race results ===
Class winners in bold. Cars failing to complete 90% of the winner's distance marked as Not Classified (NC).

Pos	Class	No	Team	Drivers	Chassis	Tyre	Laps
Pos	Class	No	Team	Drivers	Engine	Tyre	Laps
1	**C1**	**4**	**(United Kingdom) Silk Cut Jaguar**	**(Italy) Teo Fabi (United Kingdom) Derek Warwick**	**Jaguar XJR-14**	G	**83**
1	**C1**	**4**	**(United Kingdom) Silk Cut Jaguar**	**(Italy) Teo Fabi (United Kingdom) Derek Warwick**	**Cosworth HB 3.5L V8**	G	**83**
2	C1	2	(Germany) Team Sauber Mercedes	(Austria) Karl Wendlinger (Germany) Michael Schumacher	Mercedes-Benz C291	G	82
2	C1	2	(Germany) Team Sauber Mercedes	(Austria) Karl Wendlinger (Germany) Michael Schumacher	Mercedes-Benz M291 3.5L Flat-12	G	82
3	C1	3	(United Kingdom) Silk Cut Jaguar	(United Kingdom) Martin Brundle	Jaguar XJR-14	G	79
3	C1	3	(United Kingdom) Silk Cut Jaguar	(United Kingdom) Martin Brundle	Cosworth HB 3.5L V8	G	79
4	**C2**	**1**	**(Germany) Team Sauber Mercedes**	**(Germany) Jochen Mass (France) Jean-Louis Schlesser**	**Mercedes-Benz C11**	G	**79**
4	**C2**	**1**	**(Germany) Team Sauber Mercedes**	**(Germany) Jochen Mass (France) Jean-Louis Schlesser**	**Mercedes-Benz M119 5.0L Turbo V8**	G	**79**
5	C1	8	(Netherlands) Euro Racing	(Netherlands) Cor Euser (United Kingdom) Richard Piper	Spice SE90C	G	78
5	C1	8	(Netherlands) Euro Racing	(Netherlands) Cor Euser (United Kingdom) Richard Piper	Ford Cosworth DFR 3.5L V8	G	78
6	C1	5	(France) Peugeot Talbot Sport	(Italy) Mauro Baldi (France) Philippe Alliot	Peugeot 905	MI	78
6	C1	5	(France) Peugeot Talbot Sport	(Italy) Mauro Baldi (France) Philippe Alliot	Peugeot SA35 3.5L V10	MI	78
7	C2	16	(Switzerland) Repsol Brun Motorsport	(Argentina) Oscar Larrauri (Spain) Jesús Pareja	Porsche 962C	Y	77
7	C2	16	(Switzerland) Repsol Brun Motorsport	(Argentina) Oscar Larrauri (Spain) Jesús Pareja	Porsche Type-935 3.2L Turbo Flat-6	Y	77
8	C2	11	(Germany) Porsche Kremer Racing	(Germany) Manuel Reuter (Finland) Harri Toivonen	Porsche 962CK6	Y	76
8	C2	11	(Germany) Porsche Kremer Racing	(Germany) Manuel Reuter (Finland) Harri Toivonen	Porsche Type-935 3.2L Turbo Flat-6	Y	76
9	C2	13	(France) Courage Compétition	(France) Michel Trollé (Canada) Claude Bourbonnais	Cougar C26S	G	75
9	C2	13	(France) Courage Compétition	(France) Michel Trollé (Canada) Claude Bourbonnais	Porsche Type-935 3.2L Turbo Flat-6	G	75
10	C2	17	(Switzerland) Repsol Brun Motorsport	(Italy) Massimo Sigala (Switzerland) Walter Brun	Porsche 962C	Y	75
10	C2	17	(Switzerland) Repsol Brun Motorsport	(Italy) Massimo Sigala (Switzerland) Walter Brun	Porsche Type-935 3.0L Turbo Flat-6	Y	75
11	C2	18	(Japan) Mazdaspeed	(Republic of Ireland) David Kennedy (Brazil) Maurizio Sandro Sala	Mazda 787	D	74
11	C2	18	(Japan) Mazdaspeed	(Republic of Ireland) David Kennedy (Brazil) Maurizio Sandro Sala	Mazda R26B 2.6L 4-Rotor	D	74
12 NC	C2	14	(Switzerland) Team Salamin Primagaz	(Switzerland) Antoine Salamin (Morocco) Max Cohen-Olivar	Porsche 962C	G	49
12 NC	C2	14	(Switzerland) Team Salamin Primagaz	(Switzerland) Antoine Salamin (Morocco) Max Cohen-Olivar	Porsche Type-935 3.0L Turbo Flat-6	G	49
13 DNF	C1	6	(France) Peugeot Talbot Sport	(Finland) Keke Rosberg (France) Yannick Dalmas	Peugeot 905	MI	50
13 DNF	C1	6	(France) Peugeot Talbot Sport	(Finland) Keke Rosberg (France) Yannick Dalmas	Peugeot SA35 3.5L V10	MI	50
14 DNF	C2	21	(Austria) Konrad Motorsport	(Austria) Franz Konrad (United Kingdom) Tiff Needell	Porsche 962C	G	35
14 DNF	C2	21	(Austria) Konrad Motorsport	(Austria) Franz Konrad (United Kingdom) Tiff Needell	Porsche Type-935 3.2L Turbo Flat-6	G	35
15 DNF	C2	59	(Switzerland) Team Salamin Primagaz (Australia) Team Schuppan	(Sweden) Eje Elgh (United Kingdom) Jonathan Palmer	Porsche 962C	D	33
15 DNF	C2	59	(Switzerland) Team Salamin Primagaz (Australia) Team Schuppan	(Sweden) Eje Elgh (United Kingdom) Jonathan Palmer	Porsche Type-935 3.2L Turbo Flat-6	D	33
16 DNF	C2	12	(France) Courage Compétition	(Italy) Marco Brand (France) François Migault	Cougar C26S	G	6
16 DNF	C2	12	(France) Courage Compétition	(Italy) Marco Brand (France) François Migault	Porsche Type-935 3.2L Turbo Flat-6	G	6
DNS	C1	60	(France) Louis Descartes (United Kingdom) Chamberlain Engineering	(Austria) Mercedes Stermitz (United Kingdom) John Sheldon	Spice SE89C	G	-
DNS	C1	60	(France) Louis Descartes (United Kingdom) Chamberlain Engineering	(Austria) Mercedes Stermitz (United Kingdom) John Sheldon	Ford Cosworth DFZ 3.5L V8	G	-
DNQ	C1	7	(France) Louis Descartes	(Italy) Luigi Taverna (France) Philippe de Henning	ALD C91	G	-
DNQ	C1	7	(France) Louis Descartes	(Italy) Luigi Taverna (France) Philippe de Henning	Ford Cosworth DFR 3.5L V8	G	-

== Statistics ==
- Pole Position - Martin Brundle (#4 Silk Cut Jaguar) - 1:27.478
- Fastest Lap - Martin Brundle (#3 Silk Cut Jaguar) - 1:29.372
- Average Speed - 196.413 km/h

NB: Martin Brundle took the pole on #4 car (chassis-Nr 691) and made the best lap on #3 car (chassis-Nr 591). He raced only the #3 car being the solo driver.

World Sportscar Championship
Previous race: 1991 430 km of Monza	1991 season	Next race: 1991 24 Hours of Le Mans
