= 1991 430 km of Suzuka =

Layout of the Suzuka International Racing Course (1987-2002)

The 1991 430 km of Suzuka was the opening round of the 1991 World Sportscar Championship season, taking place at Suzuka Circuit, Japan. It took place on April 14, 1991.

== Qualifying ==
=== Qualifying results ===
Class leaders are in bold. The fastest time set by each entry is denoted in gray.

Pos.	Class	No.	Team	Driver 1	Qualifying 1	Qualifying 2	Driver 2	Qualifying 1	Qualifying 2	Gap	Grid
1	C1	3	**(United Kingdom) Silk Cut Jaguar**	**(United Kingdom) Derek Warwick**	**1:48.084**	No Time	(United Kingdom) Martin Brundle	No Time	2:06.162		1
2	C1	6	(France) Peugeot Talbot Sport	(Finland) Keke Rosberg	1:50.568	2:12.080	(France) Yannick Dalmas	1:51.886	No Time	+2.484	2
3	C2	1	**(Germany) Team Sauber Mercedes**	**(France) Jean-Louis Schlesser**	**1:50.764**	2:14.352	(Germany) Jochen Mass	1:55.996	2:17.170	+2.680	7
4	C1	2	(Germany) Team Sauber Mercedes	(Germany) Michael Schumacher	1:51.864	2:10.117	(Austria) Karl Wendlinger	No Time	2:09.420	+3.780	3
5	C1	5	(France) Peugeot Talbot Sport	(Italy) Mauro Baldi	1:53.419	2:14.644	(France) Philippe Alliot	1:55.479	2:11.009	+5.335	4
6	C2	11	(Germany) Porsche Kremer Racing	(Germany) Manuel Reuter	1:53.930	**2:13.610**	(Finland) Harri Toivonen	2:01.531	No Time	+5.846	8
7	C1	8	(Netherlands) Euro Racing	(Netherlands) Charles Zwolsman	2:03.630	2:22.111	(Netherlands) Cor Euser	1:54.038	2:12.760	+5.954	5
8	C2	16	(Switzerland) Repsol Brun Motorsport	(Argentina) Oscar Larrauri	1:55.706	No Time	None	N/A	N/A	+7.622	9
9	C2	18	(Japan) Mazdaspeed	(Brazil) Maurizio Sandro Sala	1:58.112	2:20.992	(Republic of Ireland) David Kennedy	1:55.849	2:23.117	+7.765	10
10	C2	58	(Japan) Mazdaspeed	(Japan) Yojiro Terada	2:00.942	No Time	(Japan) Takashi Yorino	1:56.672	No Time	+8.588	11
11	C2	12	(France) Courage Compétition	(South Africa) George Fouché	1:56.697	No Time	(Sweden) Steven Andskär	1:58.672	2:19.393	+8.613	12
12	C2	17	(Switzerland) Repsol Brun Motorsport	(Italy) Massimo Sigala	2:02.285	No Time	(Spain) Jesús Pareja	1:57.339	No Time	+9.255	13
13	C2	13	(France) Courage Compétition	(Italy) Paolo Barilla	1:59.746	No Time	(Sweden) Eje Elgh	1:59.297	2:15.543	+11.213	14
14	C1	4	(United Kingdom) Silk Cut Jaguar	(Italy) Teo Fabi	1:50.748†	2:09.070	(United Kingdom) Martin Brundle	1:48.841†	**2:03.439**	+15.355	6
15	C2	14	(Switzerland) Team Salamin Primagaz	(Switzerland) Antoine Salamin	2:12.897	No Time	(Morocco) Max Cohen-Olivar	2:09.308	No Time	+21.224	15
16	C2	15	(Italy) Veneto Equipe SRL	(Italy) Andrea Filippini	2:15.635	No Time	(Italy) Marco Brand	No Time	No Time	+27.551	DNQ
17	C1	7	(France) Louis Descartes	(France) Philippe de Henning	No Time	2:42.254	None	N/A	N/A	+52.170	DNQ

- †-time disallowed for using illegal rear wings.

== Race ==
=== Race results ===
Class winners in bold. Cars failing to complete 90% of the winner's distance marked as Not Classified (NC).

Pos	Class	No	Team	Drivers	Chassis	Tyre	Laps
Pos	Class	No	Team	Drivers	Engine	Tyre	Laps
1	**C1**	**5**	**(France) Peugeot Talbot Sport**	**(Italy) Mauro Baldi (France) Philippe Alliot**	**Peugeot 905**	MI	**74**
1	**C1**	**5**	**(France) Peugeot Talbot Sport**	**(Italy) Mauro Baldi (France) Philippe Alliot**	**Peugeot SA35 3.5L V10**	MI	**74**
2	**C2**	**1**	**(Germany) Team Sauber Mercedes**	**(Germany) Jochen Mass (France) Jean-Louis Schlesser**	**Mercedes-Benz C11**	G	**73**
2	**C2**	**1**	**(Germany) Team Sauber Mercedes**	**(Germany) Jochen Mass (France) Jean-Louis Schlesser**	**Mercedes-Benz M119 5.0L Turbo V8**	G	**73**
3	C2	11	(Germany) Porsche Kremer Racing	(Germany) Manuel Reuter (Finland) Harri Toivonen	Porsche 962CK6	Y	72
3	C2	11	(Germany) Porsche Kremer Racing	(Germany) Manuel Reuter (Finland) Harri Toivonen	Porsche Type-935 3.2L Turbo Flat-6	Y	72
4	C1	8	(Netherlands) Euro Racing	(Netherlands) Cor Euser (Netherlands) Charles Zwolsman	Spice SE90C	G	72
4	C1	8	(Netherlands) Euro Racing	(Netherlands) Cor Euser (Netherlands) Charles Zwolsman	Ford Cosworth DFR 3.5L V8	G	72
5	C2	12	(France) Courage Compétition (Japan) Trust Racing Team	(South Africa) George Fouché (Sweden) Steven Andskär	Porsche 962C GTi	D	71
5	C2	12	(France) Courage Compétition (Japan) Trust Racing Team	(South Africa) George Fouché (Sweden) Steven Andskär	Porsche Type-935 3.2L Turbo Flat-6	D	71
6	C2	18	(Japan) Mazdaspeed	(Republic of Ireland) David Kennedy (Brazil) Maurizio Sandro Sala	Mazda 787B	D	71
6	C2	18	(Japan) Mazdaspeed	(Republic of Ireland) David Kennedy (Brazil) Maurizio Sandro Sala	Mazda R26B 2.6L 4-Rotor	D	71
7	C2	17	(Switzerland) Repsol Brun Motorsport	(Italy) Massimo Sigala (Spain) Jesús Pareja	Porsche 962C	Y	70
7	C2	17	(Switzerland) Repsol Brun Motorsport	(Italy) Massimo Sigala (Spain) Jesús Pareja	Porsche Type-935 3.0L Turbo Flat-6	Y	70
8	C2	13	(France) Courage Compétition (Japan) Nisseki Racing Team	(Italy) Paolo Barilla (Sweden) Eje Elgh	Porsche 962C	D	66
8	C2	13	(France) Courage Compétition (Japan) Nisseki Racing Team	(Italy) Paolo Barilla (Sweden) Eje Elgh	Porsche Type-935 3.2L Turbo Flat-6	D	66
9	C2	14	(Switzerland) Team Salamin Primagaz	(Switzerland) Antoine Salamin (Morocco) Max Cohen-Olivar	Porsche 962C	G	66
9	C2	14	(Switzerland) Team Salamin Primagaz	(Switzerland) Antoine Salamin (Morocco) Max Cohen-Olivar	Porsche Type-935 3.0L Turbo Flat-6	G	66
10 NC	C1	3	(United Kingdom) Silk Cut Jaguar	(United Kingdom) Derek Warwick	Jaguar XJR-14	G	64
10 NC	C1	3	(United Kingdom) Silk Cut Jaguar	(United Kingdom) Derek Warwick	Cosworth HB 3.5L V8	G	64
11 NC	C2	58	(Japan) Mazdaspeed	(Japan) Takashi Yorino (Japan) Yojiro Terada	Mazda 787	D	63
11 NC	C2	58	(Japan) Mazdaspeed	(Japan) Takashi Yorino (Japan) Yojiro Terada	Mazda R26B 2.6L 4-Rotor	D	63
12 DSQ^{†}	C2	16	(Switzerland) Repsol Brun Motorsport	(Argentina) Oscar Larrauri	Porsche 962C	Y	71
12 DSQ^{†}	C2	16	(Switzerland) Repsol Brun Motorsport	(Argentina) Oscar Larrauri	Porsche Type-935 3.2L Turbo Flat-6	Y	71
13 DNF	C1	6	(France) Peugeot Talbot Sport	(Finland) Keke Rosberg (France) Yannick Dalmas	Peugeot 905	MI	36
13 DNF	C1	6	(France) Peugeot Talbot Sport	(Finland) Keke Rosberg (France) Yannick Dalmas	Peugeot SA35 3.5L V10	MI	36
14 DNF	C1	2	(Germany) Team Sauber Mercedes	(Austria) Karl Wendlinger (Germany) Michael Schumacher	Mercedes-Benz C291	G	21
14 DNF	C1	2	(Germany) Team Sauber Mercedes	(Austria) Karl Wendlinger (Germany) Michael Schumacher	Mercedes-Benz M291 3.5L Flat-12	G	21
15 DNF	C1	4	(United Kingdom) Silk Cut Jaguar	(Italy) Teo Fabi (United Kingdom) Martin Brundle	Jaguar XJR-14	G	4
15 DNF	C1	4	(United Kingdom) Silk Cut Jaguar	(Italy) Teo Fabi (United Kingdom) Martin Brundle	Cosworth HB 3.5L V8	G	4
DNQ	C1	7	(France) Louis Descartes	(France) Philippe de Henning (Italy) Luigi Taverna	ALD C91	G	-
DNQ	C1	7	(France) Louis Descartes	(France) Philippe de Henning (Italy) Luigi Taverna	Ford Cosworth DFR 3.5L V8	G	-
DNQ	C2	15	(Italy) Veneto Equipe SRL	(Italy) Marco Brand (Italy) Andrea Filippini	Lancia LC2	D	-
DNQ	C2	15	(Italy) Veneto Equipe SRL	(Italy) Marco Brand (Italy) Andrea Filippini	Ferrari 308C 3.0L Turbo V8	D	-

† - #16 Repsol Brun Motorsport was disqualified for using more than its allowed usage of fuel.

== Statistics ==
- Pole Position - Derek Warwick (#3 Silk Cut Jaguar) - 1:48.084
- Fastest Lap - Derek Warwick (#3 Silk Cut Jaguar) - 1:49.148
- Average Speed - 176.031 km/h

World Sportscar Championship
Previous race: None	1991 season	Next race: 1991 430km of Monza
