= 1991 430 km of Magny-Cours =

Layout of the Circuit de Nevers Magny-Cours (1991)

The 1991 430 km of Magny-Cours was the sixth round of the 1991 World Sportscar Championship season, taking place at Circuit de Nevers Magny-Cours, France. It took place on September 15, 1991.

== Qualifying ==
=== Qualifying results ===
Class leaders are in bold. The fastest time set by each entry is denoted in gray.

Pos.	Class	No.	Team	Qualifying 1	Qualifying 2	Gap	Grid
1	C1	6	**(France) Peugeot Talbot Sport**	**1:21.821**	1:22.343		1
2	C1	5	(France) Peugeot Talbot Sport	1:22.020	1:22.074	+0.199	2
3	C1	2	(Germany) Team Sauber Mercedes	1:24.928	1:22.784	+0.963	3
4	C1	4	(United Kingdom) Silk Cut Jaguar	1:24.326	1:23.318	+1.497	4
5	C1	3	(United Kingdom) Silk Cut Jaguar	1:24.001	1:23.402	+1.581	5
6	C1	1	(Germany) Team Sauber Mercedes	1:24.246	1:25.226	+2.425	6
7	C1	16	(Switzerland) Repsol Brun Motorsport	1:28.028	1:27.722	+5.901	7
8	C1	8	(Netherlands) Euro Racing	1:27.788	1:28.147	+5.967	8
9	C2	11	(Germany) Porsche Kremer Racing	1:29.605	1:29.381	+7.560	11
10	C2	18	(Japan) Mazdaspeed	1:30.384	1:30.424	+8.603	12
11	C2	55	(Germany) Porsche Kremer Racing	1:31.103	1:30.454	+8.633	13
12	C1	61	(Netherlands) Euro Racing	1:31.598	1:31.201	+9.380	9
13	C2	12	(France) Courage Compétition	1:32.996	1:31.737	+9.916	14
14	C2	17	(Switzerland) Repsol Brun Motorsport	1:31.987	1:35.236	+10.166	15
15	C1	21	(Austria) Konrad Motorsport	1:41.433	1:33.589	+11.768	10
16	C2	13	(France) Courage Compétition	1:35.405	1:33.744	+11.923	16
17	C1	60	(France) Louis Descartes/ (France) Racing Organisation Course	1:36.247	1:34.053	+12.232	17
18	C2	14	(Switzerland) Team Salamin Primagaz	1:36.775	1:35.530	+13.709	18
19	C1	7	(France) Louis Descartes	1:04:51.16	1:35.963	+14.142	19
20	C2	15	(Italy) Veneto Equipe SR	1:42.993	1:42.473	+20.652	DNQ

== Race ==
=== Race results ===
Class winners in bold. Cars failing to complete 90% of the winner's distance marked as Not Classified (NC).

Pos	Class	No	Team	Drivers	Chassis	Tyre	Laps
Pos	Class	No	Team	Drivers	Engine	Tyre	Laps
1	**C1**	**6**	**(France) Peugeot Talbot Sport**	**(Finland) Keke Rosberg (France) Yannick Dalmas**	**Peugeot 905 Evo 1B**	MI	**101**
1	**C1**	**6**	**(France) Peugeot Talbot Sport**	**(Finland) Keke Rosberg (France) Yannick Dalmas**	**Peugeot SA35 3.5L V10**	MI	**101**
2	C1	5	(France) Peugeot Talbot Sport	(Italy) Mauro Baldi (France) Philippe Alliot	Peugeot 905 Evo 1B	MI	101
2	C1	5	(France) Peugeot Talbot Sport	(Italy) Mauro Baldi (France) Philippe Alliot	Peugeot SA35 3.5L V10	MI	101
3	C1	4	(United Kingdom) Silk Cut Jaguar	(Italy) Teo Fabi (Australia) David Brabham	Jaguar XJR-14	G	99
3	C1	4	(United Kingdom) Silk Cut Jaguar	(Italy) Teo Fabi (Australia) David Brabham	Cosworth HB 3.5L V8	G	99
4	C1	8	(Netherlands) Euro Racing	(Netherlands) Cor Euser (Netherlands) Charles Zwolsman	Spice SE90C	G	95
4	C1	8	(Netherlands) Euro Racing	(Netherlands) Cor Euser (Netherlands) Charles Zwolsman	Ford Cosworth DFR 3.5L V8	G	95
5	C1	3	(United Kingdom) Silk Cut Jaguar	(United Kingdom) Derek Warwick (Australia) David Brabham	Jaguar XJR-14	G	94
5	C1	3	(United Kingdom) Silk Cut Jaguar	(United Kingdom) Derek Warwick (Australia) David Brabham	Cosworth HB 3.5L V8	G	94
6	**C2**	**11**	**(Germany) Porsche Kremer Racing**	**(Germany) Manuel Reuter (Finland) Harri Toivonen**	**Porsche 962CK6**	Y	**93**
6	**C2**	**11**	**(Germany) Porsche Kremer Racing**	**(Germany) Manuel Reuter (Finland) Harri Toivonen**	**Porsche Type-935 3.2L Turbo Flat-6**	Y	**93**
7	C2	18	(Japan) Mazdaspeed	(Brazil) Maurizio Sandro Sala (Belgium) Pierre Dieudonné	Mazda 787	D	92
7	C2	18	(Japan) Mazdaspeed	(Brazil) Maurizio Sandro Sala (Belgium) Pierre Dieudonné	Mazda R26B 2.6L 4-Rotor	D	92
8	C2	55	(Germany) Porsche Kremer Racing	(Mexico) Tomas Lopez (Switzerland) Gregor Foitek	Porsche 962CK6	Y	92
8	C2	55	(Germany) Porsche Kremer Racing	(Mexico) Tomas Lopez (Switzerland) Gregor Foitek	Porsche Type-935 3.2L Turbo Flat-6	Y	92
9	C2	13	(France) Courage Compétition	(Italy) Marco Brand (France) Denis Morin	Cougar C26S	G	90
9	C2	13	(France) Courage Compétition	(Italy) Marco Brand (France) Denis Morin	Porsche Type-935 3.2L Turbo Flat-6	G	90
10	C2	14	(Switzerland) Team Salamin Primagaz (Germany) Obermaier Racing	(Germany) Otto Altenbach (Germany) Jürgen Lässig	Porsche 962C	G	90
10	C2	14	(Switzerland) Team Salamin Primagaz (Germany) Obermaier Racing	(Germany) Otto Altenbach (Germany) Jürgen Lässig	Porsche Type-935 3.2L Turbo Flat-6	G	90
11 NC	C1	7	(France) Louis Descartes	(France) Patrick Gonin (Italy) Luigi Taverna	ALD C91	G	87
11 NC	C1	7	(France) Louis Descartes	(France) Patrick Gonin (Italy) Luigi Taverna	Ford Cosworth DFR 3.5L V8	G	87
12 NC	C2	17	(Switzerland) Repsol Brun Motorsport	(Switzerland) Walter Brun (Spain) Jesús Pareja	Porsche 962C	Y	73
12 NC	C2	17	(Switzerland) Repsol Brun Motorsport	(Switzerland) Walter Brun (Spain) Jesús Pareja	Porsche Type-935 3.2L Turbo Flat-6	Y	73
13 DNF	C1	61	(Netherlands) Euro Racing	(France) Henri Pescarolo (France) Jean-Louis Ricci	Spice SE90C	G	70
13 DNF	C1	61	(Netherlands) Euro Racing	(France) Henri Pescarolo (France) Jean-Louis Ricci	Ford Cosworth DFR 3.5L V8	G	70
14 DNF	C1	2	(Germany) Team Sauber Mercedes	(Austria) Karl Wendlinger (Germany) Michael Schumacher	Mercedes-Benz C291	G	23
14 DNF	C1	2	(Germany) Team Sauber Mercedes	(Austria) Karl Wendlinger (Germany) Michael Schumacher	Mercedes-Benz M291 3.5L Flat-12	G	23
15 DNF	C2	12	(France) Courage Compétition	(France) Lionel Robert (France) François Migault	Cougar C26S	G	19
15 DNF	C2	12	(France) Courage Compétition	(France) Lionel Robert (France) François Migault	Porsche Type-935 3.2L Turbo Flat-6	G	19
16 DNF	C1	60	(France) Louis Descartes (France) Racing Organisation Course	(France) Pascal Fabre (Switzerland) Bernard Thuner	ROC 002	G	19
16 DNF	C1	60	(France) Louis Descartes (France) Racing Organisation Course	(France) Pascal Fabre (Switzerland) Bernard Thuner	Ford Cosworth DFR 3.5L V8	G	19
17 DNF	C1	21	(Austria) Konrad Motorsport	(Austria) Franz Konrad (Sweden) Stefan Johansson	Konrad KM-011	Y	18
17 DNF	C1	21	(Austria) Konrad Motorsport	(Austria) Franz Konrad (Sweden) Stefan Johansson	Lamborghini 3512 3.5L V12	Y	18
18 DNF	C1	1	(Germany) Team Sauber Mercedes	(France) Jean-Louis Schlesser	Mercedes-Benz C291	G	9
18 DNF	C1	1	(Germany) Team Sauber Mercedes	(France) Jean-Louis Schlesser	Mercedes-Benz M291 3.5L Flat-12	G	9
19 DNF	C1	16	(Switzerland) Repsol Brun Motorsport	(Argentina) Oscar Larrauri (Spain) Jesús Pareja	Brun C91	Y	5
19 DNF	C1	16	(Switzerland) Repsol Brun Motorsport	(Argentina) Oscar Larrauri (Spain) Jesús Pareja	Judd EV 3.5L V8	Y	5
DNQ	C2	15	(Italy) Veneto Equipe SRL	(Italy) Almo Coppelli	Lancia LC2	D	-
DNQ	C2	15	(Italy) Veneto Equipe SRL	(Italy) Almo Coppelli	Ferrari 308C 3.1L Turbo V8	D	-

== Statistics ==
- Pole Position - Yannick Dalmas (#6 Peugeot Talbot Sport) - 1:21.821
- Fastest Lap - Philippe Alliot (#5 Peugeot Talbot Sport) - 1:25.823
- Average Speed - 170.685 km/h

World Sportscar Championship
Previous race: 1991 430km of Nürburgring	1991 season	Next race: 1991 430km of Mexico City
