= 1991 Sportscar World Championship =

Racing tournament

1991 World Sportscar Championship

Seasons
- ← 1990 1992 →

The 1991 FIA Sportscar World Championship season was the 39th season of FIA World Sportscar Championship motor racing. It featured the 1991 FIA Sportscar World Championship, which was contested over an eight race series from 14 April to 28 October 28, 1991. The series was open to Group C Sportscars, with Category 1 cars complying with new 1991 Group C rules and Category 2 cars running under the pre 1991 regulations. Teo Fabi won the Drivers Championship and Silk Cut Jaguar won the Teams title.

== Schedule ==
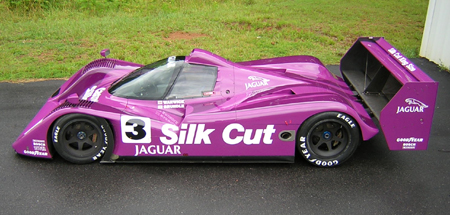
Silk Cut Jaguar won the Teams Championship with Jaguar XJR-14 (above) and XJR-12 models

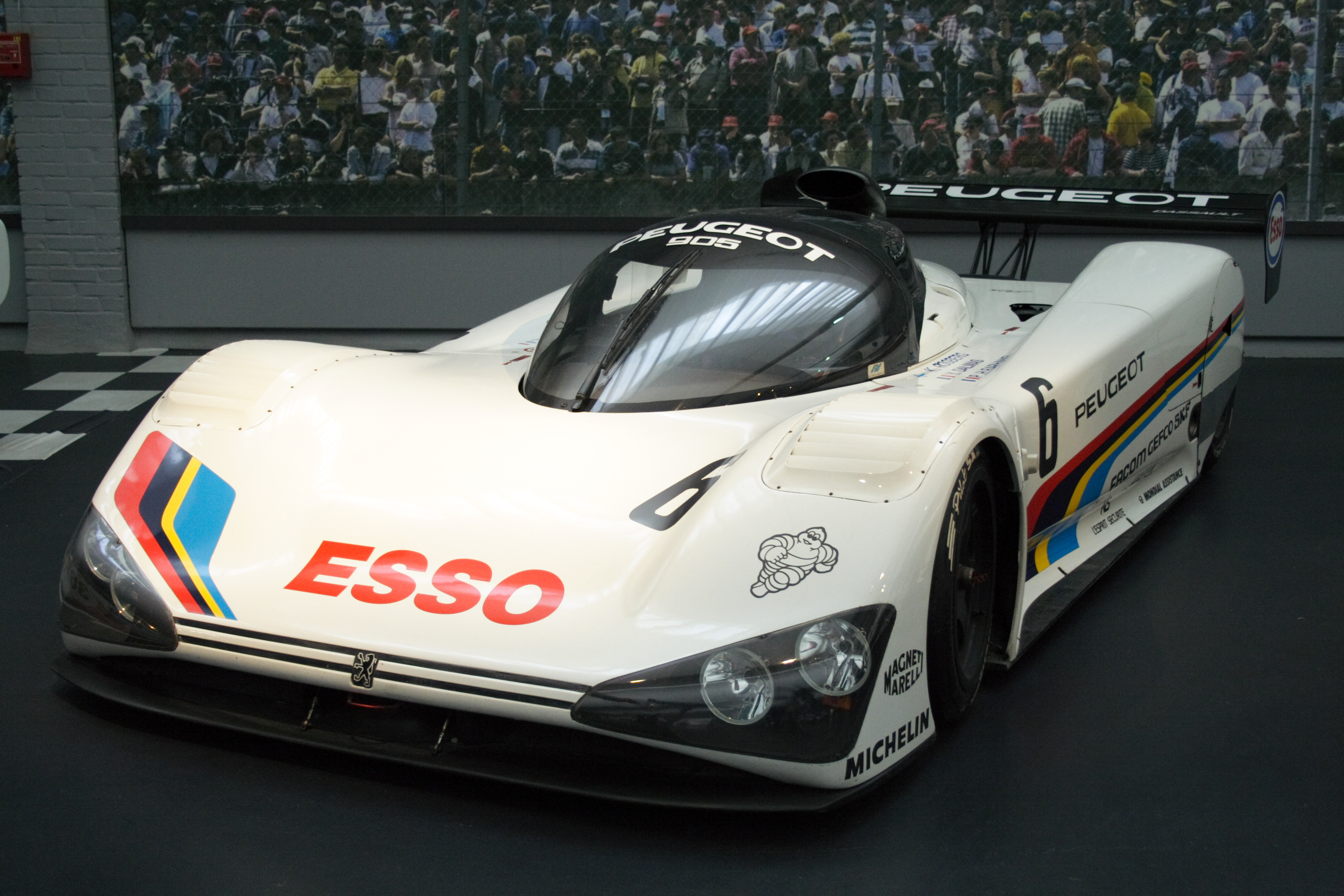
Peugeot Talbot Sport placed second with the 905

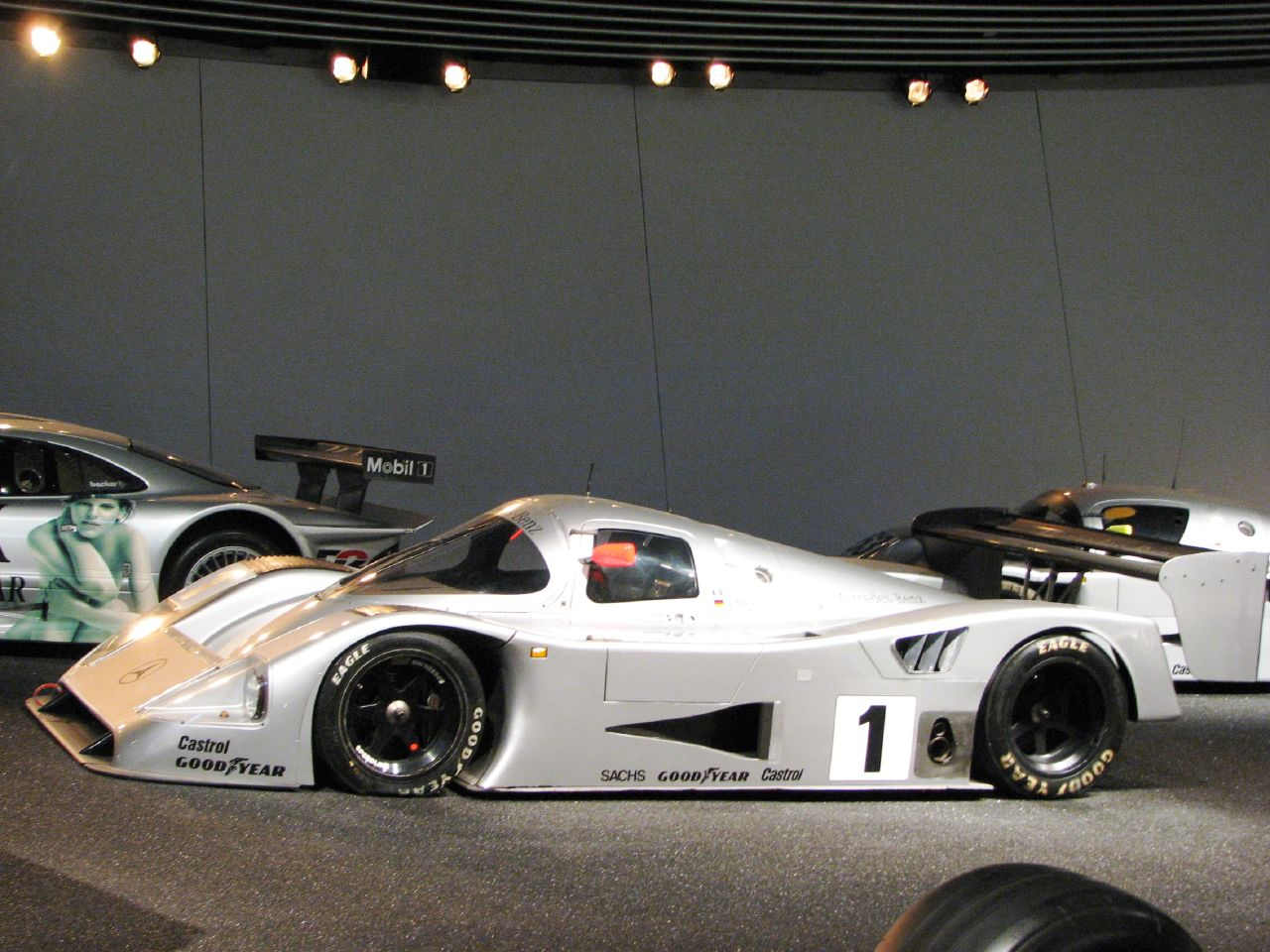
Team Sauber Mercedes placed third with the Mercedes C11 (above) and C291 models

Rnd	Race	Circuit	Date
1	(Japan) Fuji Film Cup (430 km)	Suzuka Circuit	14 April
2	(Italy) Trofeo F. Caracciolo (430km)	Autodromo Nazionale Monza	5 May
3	(United Kingdom) Castrol BRDC Empire Trophy (430 km)	Silverstone Circuit	19 May
4	(France) 24 Hours of Le Mans	Circuit de la Sarthe	22 June; 23 June
5	(Germany) ADAC Sportwagen-Weltmeisterschaft (430km)	Nürburgring	18 August
6	(France) Championnat du Monde de Voitures de Sport (430 km)	Circuit de Nevers Magny-Cours	15 September
7	(Mexico) Trofeo Hermanos Rodriguez (430 km)	Autodromo Hermanos Rodriguez	6 October
8	(Japan) SWC in Autopolis (430 km)	Autopolis	28 October

== Entries ==
Entrant	Car	Engine	Tyre	No.	Drivers	Rounds
(Germany) Team Sauber-Mercedes	Mercedes-Benz C11; Mercedes-Benz C291	Mercedes-Benz M119 5.0 L Turbo V8; Mercedes-Benz M291 3.5 L Flat-12	G	1	(France) Jean-Louis Schlesser	All
(Germany) Team Sauber-Mercedes	Mercedes-Benz C11; Mercedes-Benz C291	Mercedes-Benz M119 5.0 L Turbo V8; Mercedes-Benz M291 3.5 L Flat-12	G	1	(Germany) Jochen Mass	All
(Germany) Team Sauber-Mercedes	Mercedes-Benz C11; Mercedes-Benz C291	Mercedes-Benz M119 5.0 L Turbo V8; Mercedes-Benz M291 3.5 L Flat-12	G	1	(France) Alain Ferté	4
(Germany) Team Sauber-Mercedes	Mercedes-Benz C11; Mercedes-Benz C291	Mercedes-Benz M119 5.0 L Turbo V8; Mercedes-Benz M291 3.5 L Flat-12	G	2	(Austria) Karl Wendlinger	1–3, 5–8
(Germany) Team Sauber-Mercedes	Mercedes-Benz C11; Mercedes-Benz C291	Mercedes-Benz M119 5.0 L Turbo V8; Mercedes-Benz M291 3.5 L Flat-12	G	2	(Germany) Michael Schumacher	1–3, 5–8
(Germany) Team Sauber-Mercedes	Mercedes-Benz C11; Mercedes-Benz C291	Mercedes-Benz M119 5.0 L Turbo V8; Mercedes-Benz M291 3.5 L Flat-12	G	31	(Austria) Karl Wendlinger	4
(Germany) Team Sauber-Mercedes	Mercedes-Benz C11; Mercedes-Benz C291	Mercedes-Benz M119 5.0 L Turbo V8; Mercedes-Benz M291 3.5 L Flat-12	G	31	(Germany) Michael Schumacher	4
(Germany) Team Sauber-Mercedes	Mercedes-Benz C11; Mercedes-Benz C291	Mercedes-Benz M119 5.0 L Turbo V8; Mercedes-Benz M291 3.5 L Flat-12	G	31	(Germany) Fritz Kreutzpointner	4
(Germany) Team Sauber-Mercedes	Mercedes-Benz C11; Mercedes-Benz C291	Mercedes-Benz M119 5.0 L Turbo V8; Mercedes-Benz M291 3.5 L Flat-12	G	32	(United Kingdom) Jonathan Palmer	4
(Germany) Team Sauber-Mercedes	Mercedes-Benz C11; Mercedes-Benz C291	Mercedes-Benz M119 5.0 L Turbo V8; Mercedes-Benz M291 3.5 L Flat-12	G	32	(Sweden) Stanley Dickens	4
(Germany) Team Sauber-Mercedes	Mercedes-Benz C11; Mercedes-Benz C291	Mercedes-Benz M119 5.0 L Turbo V8; Mercedes-Benz M291 3.5 L Flat-12	G	32	(Denmark) Kurt Thiim	4
(United Kingdom) Silk Cut Jaguar	Jaguar XJR-14	Jaguar HB 3.5 L V8	G	3	(United Kingdom) Derek Warwick	1–3, 5–8
(United Kingdom) Silk Cut Jaguar	Jaguar XJR-14	Jaguar HB 3.5 L V8	G	3	(United Kingdom) Martin Brundle	1–3
(United Kingdom) Silk Cut Jaguar	Jaguar XJR-14	Jaguar HB 3.5 L V8	G	3	(Australia) David Brabham	5–8
(United Kingdom) Silk Cut Jaguar	Jaguar XJR-14	Jaguar HB 3.5 L V8	G	4	(Italy) Teo Fabi	1–3, 5–8
(United Kingdom) Silk Cut Jaguar	Jaguar XJR-14	Jaguar HB 3.5 L V8	G	4	(United Kingdom) Martin Brundle	1–2
(United Kingdom) Silk Cut Jaguar	Jaguar XJR-14	Jaguar HB 3.5 L V8	G	4	(United Kingdom) Derek Warwick	3
(United Kingdom) Silk Cut Jaguar	Jaguar XJR-14	Jaguar HB 3.5 L V8	G	4	(Australia) David Brabham	5–6, 8
(United Kingdom) Silk Cut Jaguar	Jaguar XJR-12	Jaguar 7.4 L V12	G	33	(United Kingdom) Derek Warwick	4
(United Kingdom) Silk Cut Jaguar	Jaguar XJR-12	Jaguar 7.4 L V12	G	33	(United Kingdom) Andy Wallace	4
(United Kingdom) Silk Cut Jaguar	Jaguar XJR-12	Jaguar 7.4 L V12	G	33	(Denmark) John Nielsen	4
(United Kingdom) Silk Cut Jaguar	Jaguar XJR-12	Jaguar 7.4 L V12	G	34	(Italy) Teo Fabi	4
(United Kingdom) Silk Cut Jaguar	Jaguar XJR-12	Jaguar 7.4 L V12	G	34	(France) Bob Wollek	4
(United Kingdom) Silk Cut Jaguar	Jaguar XJR-12	Jaguar 7.4 L V12	G	34	(United Kingdom) Kenny Acheson	4
(United Kingdom) Silk Cut Jaguar	Jaguar XJR-12	Jaguar 7.4 L V12	G	35	(United States) Davy Jones	4
(United Kingdom) Silk Cut Jaguar	Jaguar XJR-12	Jaguar 7.4 L V12	G	35	(Brazil) Raul Boesel	4
(United Kingdom) Silk Cut Jaguar	Jaguar XJR-12	Jaguar 7.4 L V12	G	35	(France) Michel Ferté	4
(United Kingdom) TWR Suntec Jaguar	Jaguar XJR-12	Jaguar 7.4 L V12	G	36	(United Kingdom) David Leslie	4
(United Kingdom) TWR Suntec Jaguar	Jaguar XJR-12	Jaguar 7.4 L V12	G	36	(Italy) Mauro Martini	4
(United Kingdom) TWR Suntec Jaguar	Jaguar XJR-12	Jaguar 7.4 L V12	G	36	(United States) Jeff Krosnoff	4
(France) Peugeot Talbot Sport	Peugeot 905; Peugeot 905 Evo 1 Bis	Peugeot SA35-A1 3.5 L V10; Peugeot SA35-A2 3.5 L V10	M	5	(France) Philippe Alliot	All
(France) Peugeot Talbot Sport	Peugeot 905; Peugeot 905 Evo 1 Bis	Peugeot SA35-A1 3.5 L V10; Peugeot SA35-A2 3.5 L V10	M	5	(Italy) Mauro Baldi	All
(France) Peugeot Talbot Sport	Peugeot 905; Peugeot 905 Evo 1 Bis	Peugeot SA35-A1 3.5 L V10; Peugeot SA35-A2 3.5 L V10	M	5	(France) Jean-Pierre Jabouille	4
(France) Peugeot Talbot Sport	Peugeot 905; Peugeot 905 Evo 1 Bis	Peugeot SA35-A1 3.5 L V10; Peugeot SA35-A2 3.5 L V10	M	6	(Finland) Keke Rosberg	All
(France) Peugeot Talbot Sport	Peugeot 905; Peugeot 905 Evo 1 Bis	Peugeot SA35-A1 3.5 L V10; Peugeot SA35-A2 3.5 L V10	M	6	(France) Yannick Dalmas	All
(France) Peugeot Talbot Sport	Peugeot 905; Peugeot 905 Evo 1 Bis	Peugeot SA35-A1 3.5 L V10; Peugeot SA35-A2 3.5 L V10	M	6	(France) Pierre-Henri Raphanel	4
(France) Louis Descartes	ALD C91; Spice SE89C	Ford Cosworth DFR 3.5 L V8; Ford Cosworth DFZ 3.5 L V8	G	7	(France) Philippe de Henning	1–2, 4
(France) Louis Descartes	ALD C91; Spice SE89C	Ford Cosworth DFR 3.5 L V8; Ford Cosworth DFZ 3.5 L V8	G	7	(Italy) Luigi Taverna	2–4, 6–7
(France) Louis Descartes	ALD C91; Spice SE89C	Ford Cosworth DFR 3.5 L V8; Ford Cosworth DFZ 3.5 L V8	G	7	(France) Patrick Gonin	4, 6–7
(France) Louis Descartes	ALD C91; Spice SE89C	Ford Cosworth DFR 3.5 L V8; Ford Cosworth DFZ 3.5 L V8	G	7	(Italy) Ranieri Randaccio	5
(France) Louis Descartes	ALD C91; Spice SE89C	Ford Cosworth DFR 3.5 L V8; Ford Cosworth DFZ 3.5 L V8	G	7	(Italy) Mirko Savoldi	5
(France) Louis Descartes	ROC 002	Ford Cosworth DFR 3.5 L V8	G	37; 60	(France) Pascal Fabre	4, 6
(France) Louis Descartes	ROC 002	Ford Cosworth DFR 3.5 L V8	G	37; 60	(Switzerland) Bernard Thuner	4, 6
(France) Louis Descartes	Spice SE89C	Ford Cosworth DFZ 3.5 L V8	G	39	(France) Michel Maisonneuve	4
(France) Louis Descartes	Spice SE89C	Ford Cosworth DFZ 3.5 L V8	G	39	(France) Xavier Lapeyre	4
(France) Louis Descartes	Spice SE89C	Ford Cosworth DFZ 3.5 L V8	G	39	(France) Jean-Philippe Grand	4
(France) Louis Descartes	Spice SE89C	Ford Cosworth DFZ 3.5 L V8	G	60	(United Kingdom) John Sheldon	3
(France) Louis Descartes	Spice SE89C	Ford Cosworth DFZ 3.5 L V8	G	60	(Austria) Mercedes Stermitz	3
(Netherlands) Euro Racing	Spice SE90C	Ford Cosworth DFR 3.5 L V8	G	8	(Netherlands) Cor Euser	All
(Netherlands) Euro Racing	Spice SE90C	Ford Cosworth DFR 3.5 L V8	G	8	(Netherlands) Charles Zwolsman	1–2, 4–8
(Netherlands) Euro Racing	Spice SE90C	Ford Cosworth DFR 3.5 L V8	G	8	(United Kingdom) Richard Piper	3
(Netherlands) Euro Racing	Spice SE90C	Ford Cosworth DFR 3.5 L V8	G	8	(United Kingdom) Tim Harvey	4
(Netherlands) Euro Racing	Spice SE90C	Ford Cosworth DFZ 3.5 L V8	D	40	(United States) Lyn St. James	4
(Netherlands) Euro Racing	Spice SE90C	Ford Cosworth DFZ 3.5 L V8	D	40	(South Africa) Desiré Wilson	4
(Netherlands) Euro Racing	Spice SE90C	Ford Cosworth DFZ 3.5 L V8	D	40	(France) Cathy Muller	4
(Netherlands) Euro Racing	Spice SE90C	Ford Cosworth DFZ 3.5 L V8	G	41	(Japan) Naoki Nagasaka	4
(Netherlands) Euro Racing	Spice SE90C	Ford Cosworth DFZ 3.5 L V8	G	41	(Japan) Hisashi Yokoshima	4
(Netherlands) Euro Racing	Spice SE90C	Ford Cosworth DFZ 3.5 L V8	G	41	(Japan) Kiyoshi Misaki	4
(Netherlands) Euro Racing	Spice SE88P	Ferrari 3.5 L V8	G	42	(United Kingdom) Justin Bell	4
(Netherlands) Euro Racing	Spice SE88P	Ferrari 3.5 L V8	G	42	(Japan) Syunji Kasuya	4
(Netherlands) Euro Racing	Spice SE89C	Ford Cosworth DFZ 3.5 L V8	G	43	(France) Jean-Louis Ricci	4
(Netherlands) Euro Racing	Spice SE89C	Ford Cosworth DFZ 3.5 L V8	G	43	(United States) Olindo Iacobelli	4
(Netherlands) Euro Racing	Spice SE89C	Ford Cosworth DFZ 3.5 L V8	G	43	(United Kingdom) Richard Piper	4
(Netherlands) Euro Racing	Spice SE89C	Ford Cosworth DFZ 3.5 L V8	G	44	(United Kingdom) John Sheldon	4
(Netherlands) Euro Racing	Spice SE89C	Ford Cosworth DFZ 3.5 L V8	G	44	(United Kingdom) Charles Rickett	4
(Netherlands) Euro Racing	Spice SE89C	Ford Cosworth DFZ 3.5 L V8	G	44	(France) Ferdinand de Lesseps	4
(Netherlands) Euro Racing	Spice SE89C	Ford Cosworth DFZ 3.5 L V8	G	45	(United Kingdom) Nick Adams	4
(Netherlands) Euro Racing	Spice SE89C	Ford Cosworth DFZ 3.5 L V8	G	45	(United Kingdom) Richard Jones	4
(Netherlands) Euro Racing	Spice SE89C	Ford Cosworth DFZ 3.5 L V8	G	45	(United Kingdom) Robin Donovan	4
(Netherlands) Euro Racing	Spice SE90C	Ford Cosworth DFR 3.5 L V8	G	61	(France) Henri Pescarolo	6
(Netherlands) Euro Racing	Spice SE90C	Ford Cosworth DFR 3.5 L V8	G	61	(France) Jean-Louis Ricci	6
(Netherlands) Euro Racing	Spice SE90C	Ford Cosworth DFR 3.5 L V8	G	61	(South Africa) Wayne Taylor	8
(Netherlands) Euro Racing	Spice SE90C	Ford Cosworth DFR 3.5 L V8	G	61	(Japan) Hideshi Matsuda	8
(Germany) Porsche Kremer Racing	Porsche 962CK6	Porsche Type-935/82 3.2 L Turbo Flat-6	Y	11	(Germany) Manuel Reuter	All
(Germany) Porsche Kremer Racing	Porsche 962CK6	Porsche Type-935/82 3.2 L Turbo Flat-6	Y	11	(Finland) Harri Toivonen	1–6, 8
(Germany) Porsche Kremer Racing	Porsche 962CK6	Porsche Type-935/82 3.2 L Turbo Flat-6	Y	11	(Finland) JJ Lehto	4
(Germany) Porsche Kremer Racing	Porsche 962CK6	Porsche Type-935/82 3.2 L Turbo Flat-6	Y	11	(Mexico) Tomas Lopez	7
(Germany) Porsche Kremer Racing	Porsche 962CK6	Porsche Type-935/82 3.2 L Turbo Flat-6	Y	46	(United Kingdom) Tiff Needell	4
(Germany) Porsche Kremer Racing	Porsche 962CK6	Porsche Type-935/82 3.2 L Turbo Flat-6	Y	46	(Switzerland) Gregor Foitek	4
(Germany) Porsche Kremer Racing	Porsche 962CK6	Porsche Type-935/82 3.2 L Turbo Flat-6	Y	46	(Mexico) Tomas Lopez	4
(Germany) Porsche Kremer Racing	Porsche 962CK6	Porsche Type-935/82 3.2 L Turbo Flat-6	Y	55	(Germany) Otto Rensing	5
(Germany) Porsche Kremer Racing	Porsche 962CK6	Porsche Type-935/82 3.2 L Turbo Flat-6	Y	55	(Austria) Mercedes Stermitz	5
(Germany) Porsche Kremer Racing	Porsche 962CK6	Porsche Type-935/82 3.2 L Turbo Flat-6	Y	55	(Switzerland) Gregor Foitek	6
(Germany) Porsche Kremer Racing	Porsche 962CK6	Porsche Type-935/82 3.2 L Turbo Flat-6	Y	55	(Mexico) Tomas Lopez	6
(France) Courage Compétition	Porsche 962C; Porsche 962C GTi; Cougar C26S	Porsche Type-935/82 3.2 L Flat-6	D G	12	(Sweden) Steven Andskär	1, 8
(France) Courage Compétition	Porsche 962C; Porsche 962C GTi; Cougar C26S	Porsche Type-935/82 3.2 L Flat-6	D G	12	(South Africa) George Fouché	1, 8
(France) Courage Compétition	Porsche 962C; Porsche 962C GTi; Cougar C26S	Porsche Type-935/82 3.2 L Flat-6	D G	12	(France) François Migault	2–7
(France) Courage Compétition	Porsche 962C; Porsche 962C GTi; Cougar C26S	Porsche Type-935/82 3.2 L Flat-6	D G	12	(France) Lionel Robert	2, 4–6
(France) Courage Compétition	Porsche 962C; Porsche 962C GTi; Cougar C26S	Porsche Type-935/82 3.2 L Flat-6	D G	12	(Italy) Marco Brand	3
(France) Courage Compétition	Porsche 962C; Porsche 962C GTi; Cougar C26S	Porsche Type-935/82 3.2 L Flat-6	D G	12	(France) Jean-Daniel Raulet	4
(France) Courage Compétition	Porsche 962C; Porsche 962C GTi; Cougar C26S	Porsche Type-935/82 3.2 L Flat-6	D G	12	(Spain) Tomás Saldaña	7
(France) Courage Compétition	Porsche 962C; Porsche 962C GTi; Cougar C26S	Porsche Type-935/82 3.2 L Flat-6	D G	13	(Sweden) Eje Elgh	1, 8
(France) Courage Compétition	Porsche 962C; Porsche 962C GTi; Cougar C26S	Porsche Type-935/82 3.2 L Flat-6	D G	13	(Italy) Paolo Barilla	1, 8
(France) Courage Compétition	Porsche 962C; Porsche 962C GTi; Cougar C26S	Porsche Type-935/82 3.2 L Flat-6	D G	13	(France) Michel Trollé	2–3
(France) Courage Compétition	Porsche 962C; Porsche 962C GTi; Cougar C26S	Porsche Type-935/82 3.2 L Flat-6	D G	13	(Canada) Claude Bourbonnais	2–3
(France) Courage Compétition	Porsche 962C; Porsche 962C GTi; Cougar C26S	Porsche Type-935/82 3.2 L Flat-6	D G	13	(United Kingdom) Johnny Dumfries	4
(France) Courage Compétition	Porsche 962C; Porsche 962C GTi; Cougar C26S	Porsche Type-935/82 3.2 L Flat-6	D G	13	(Sweden) Anders Olofsson	4
(France) Courage Compétition	Porsche 962C; Porsche 962C GTi; Cougar C26S	Porsche Type-935/82 3.2 L Flat-6	D G	13	(Sweden) Thomas Danielsson	4
(France) Courage Compétition	Porsche 962C; Porsche 962C GTi; Cougar C26S	Porsche Type-935/82 3.2 L Flat-6	D G	13	(Italy) Marco Brand	5–6
(France) Courage Compétition	Porsche 962C; Porsche 962C GTi; Cougar C26S	Porsche Type-935/82 3.2 L Flat-6	D G	13	(Italy) Andrea Filippini	5
(France) Courage Compétition	Porsche 962C; Porsche 962C GTi; Cougar C26S	Porsche Type-935/82 3.2 L Flat-6	D G	13	(France) Denis Morin	6
(France) Courage Compétition	Porsche 962C; Porsche 962C GTi; Cougar C26S	Porsche Type-935/82 3.2 L Flat-6	D G	13	(France) Pascal Fabre	7
(France) Courage Compétition	Porsche 962C; Porsche 962C GTi; Cougar C26S	Porsche Type-935/82 3.2 L Flat-6	D G	13	(France) Lionel Robert	7
(France) Courage Compétition	Porsche 962C; Porsche 962C GTi; Cougar C26S	Porsche Type-935/82 3.2 L Flat-6	D G	47	(France) Michel Trollé	4
(France) Courage Compétition	Porsche 962C; Porsche 962C GTi; Cougar C26S	Porsche Type-935/82 3.2 L Flat-6	D G	47	(Italy) Marco Brand	4
(France) Courage Compétition	Porsche 962C; Porsche 962C GTi; Cougar C26S	Porsche Type-935/82 3.2 L Flat-6	D G	47	(Canada) Claude Bourbonnais	4
(France) Courage Compétition	Porsche 962C; Porsche 962C GTi; Cougar C26S	Porsche Type-935/82 3.2 L Flat-6	D G	48	(United Kingdom) Chris Hodgetts	4
(France) Courage Compétition	Porsche 962C; Porsche 962C GTi; Cougar C26S	Porsche Type-935/82 3.2 L Flat-6	D G	48	(United Kingdom) Andrew Hepworth	4
(France) Courage Compétition	Porsche 962C; Porsche 962C GTi; Cougar C26S	Porsche Type-935/82 3.2 L Flat-6	D G	48	(France) Thierry Lecerf	4
(France) Courage Compétition	Porsche 962C	Porsche Type-935/82 3.2 L Flat-6	D	49	(Sweden) Steven Andskär	4
(France) Courage Compétition	Porsche 962C	Porsche Type-935/82 3.2 L Flat-6	D	49	(South Africa) George Fouché	4
(France) Courage Compétition	Porsche 962C	Porsche Type-935/82 3.0 L Turbo Flat-6	G	50	(France) Jean-Marie Alméras	4
(France) Courage Compétition	Porsche 962C	Porsche Type-935/82 3.0 L Turbo Flat-6	G	50	(France) Jacques Alméras	4
(France) Courage Compétition	Porsche 962C	Porsche Type-935/82 3.0 L Turbo Flat-6	G	50	(France) Pierre de Thoisy	4
(Switzerland) Team Salamin Primagaz	Porsche 962C	Porsche Type-935/82 3.2 L Turbo Flat-6	G D	14	(Switzerland) Antoine Salamin	1–5
(Switzerland) Team Salamin Primagaz	Porsche 962C	Porsche Type-935/82 3.2 L Turbo Flat-6	G D	14	(Morocco) Max Cohen-Olivar	1–4
(Switzerland) Team Salamin Primagaz	Porsche 962C	Porsche Type-935/82 3.2 L Turbo Flat-6	G D	14	(France) Marcel Tarrès	4
(Switzerland) Team Salamin Primagaz	Porsche 962C	Porsche Type-935/82 3.2 L Turbo Flat-6	G D	14	(France) Pierre Yver	5
(Switzerland) Team Salamin Primagaz	Porsche 962C	Porsche Type-935/82 3.2 L Turbo Flat-6	G D	14	(Germany) Otto Altenbach	6
(Switzerland) Team Salamin Primagaz	Porsche 962C	Porsche Type-935/82 3.2 L Turbo Flat-6	G D	14	(Germany) Jürgen Lässig	6
(Switzerland) Team Salamin Primagaz	Porsche 962C	Porsche Type-935/82 3.2 L Turbo Flat-6	G D	14	(Germany) Bernd Schneider	7
(Switzerland) Team Salamin Primagaz	Porsche 962C	Porsche Type-935/82 3.2 L Turbo Flat-6	G D	14	(Germany) "John Winter"	7
(Switzerland) Team Salamin Primagaz	Porsche 962C	Porsche Type-935/82 3.2 L Turbo Flat-6	G D	14	(Austria) Roland Ratzenberger	8
(Switzerland) Team Salamin Primagaz	Porsche 962C	Porsche Type-935/82 3.2 L Turbo Flat-6	G D	14	(Sweden) Eje Elgh	8
(Switzerland) Team Salamin Primagaz	Porsche 962C	Porsche Type-935/82 3.2 L Turbo Flat-6	G D	51	(Germany) Otto Altenbach	4
(Switzerland) Team Salamin Primagaz	Porsche 962C	Porsche Type-935/82 3.2 L Turbo Flat-6	G D	51	(Germany) Jürgen Lässig	4
(Switzerland) Team Salamin Primagaz	Porsche 962C	Porsche Type-935/82 3.2 L Turbo Flat-6	G D	51	(France) Pierre Yver	4
(Switzerland) Team Salamin Primagaz	Porsche 962C	Porsche Type-935/82 3.2 L Turbo Flat-6	D	52	(Austria) Roland Ratzenberger	4
(Switzerland) Team Salamin Primagaz	Porsche 962C	Porsche Type-935/82 3.2 L Turbo Flat-6	D	52	(Sweden) Eje Elgh	4
(Switzerland) Team Salamin Primagaz	Porsche 962C	Porsche Type-935/82 3.2 L Turbo Flat-6	D	52	(United Kingdom) Will Hoy	4
(Switzerland) Team Salamin Primagaz	Porsche 962C	Porsche Type-935/82 3.2 L Turbo Flat-6	D	53	(United Kingdom) James Weaver	4
(Switzerland) Team Salamin Primagaz	Porsche 962C	Porsche Type-935/82 3.2 L Turbo Flat-6	D	53	(United States) Hurley Haywood	4
(Switzerland) Team Salamin Primagaz	Porsche 962C	Porsche Type-935/82 3.2 L Turbo Flat-6	D	53	(South Africa) Wayne Taylor	4
(Switzerland) Team Salamin Primagaz	Porsche 962C	Porsche Type-935/82 3.2 L Turbo Flat-6	D	54	(Japan) Katsunori Iketani	4
(Switzerland) Team Salamin Primagaz	Porsche 962C	Porsche Type-935/82 3.2 L Turbo Flat-6	D	54	(Austria) Mercedes Stermitz	4
(Switzerland) Team Salamin Primagaz	Porsche 962C	Porsche Type-935/82 3.2 L Turbo Flat-6	D G	59	(United Kingdom) Jonathan Palmer	3
(Switzerland) Team Salamin Primagaz	Porsche 962C	Porsche Type-935/82 3.2 L Turbo Flat-6	D G	59	(Sweden) Eje Elgh	3
(Switzerland) Team Salamin Primagaz	Porsche 962C	Porsche Type-935/82 3.2 L Turbo Flat-6	D G	59	(Germany) Jürgen Oppermann	5
(Switzerland) Team Salamin Primagaz	Porsche 962C	Porsche Type-935/82 3.2 L Turbo Flat-6	D G	59	(Germany) Otto Altenbach	5
(Switzerland) Team Salamin Primagaz	Porsche 962C	Porsche Type-935/82 3.2 L Turbo Flat-6	D G	59	(United Kingdom) Derek Bell	7
(Switzerland) Team Salamin Primagaz	Porsche 962C	Porsche Type-935/82 3.2 L Turbo Flat-6	D G	59	(Italy) Gianpiero Moretti	7
(Italy) Veneto Equipe	Lancia LC2 SP91	Ferrari 308C 3.1 L Turbo V8	D	15	(Italy) Andrea Filippini	1–2
(Italy) Veneto Equipe	Lancia LC2 SP91	Ferrari 308C 3.1 L Turbo V8	D	15	(Italy) Marco Brand	1–2
(Italy) Veneto Equipe	Lancia LC2 SP91	Ferrari 308C 3.1 L Turbo V8	D	15	(Italy) Almo Coppelli	4–6
(Italy) Veneto Equipe	Lancia LC2 SP91	Ferrari 308C 3.1 L Turbo V8	D	15	(Italy) Luigi Giorgio	4
(Switzerland) Repsol Brun Motorsport	Porsche 962C; Brun C91	Porsche Type-935/82 3.2 L Turbo Flat-6; Judd EV 3.5 L V8	Y	16	(Argentina) Oscar Larrauri	1–3, 5–8
(Switzerland) Repsol Brun Motorsport	Porsche 962C; Brun C91	Porsche Type-935/82 3.2 L Turbo Flat-6; Judd EV 3.5 L V8	Y	16	(Switzerland) Bernard Santal	1, 4
(Switzerland) Repsol Brun Motorsport	Porsche 962C; Brun C91	Porsche Type-935/82 3.2 L Turbo Flat-6; Judd EV 3.5 L V8	Y	16	(Italy) Massimo Sigala	2
(Switzerland) Repsol Brun Motorsport	Porsche 962C; Brun C91	Porsche Type-935/82 3.2 L Turbo Flat-6; Judd EV 3.5 L V8	Y	16	(Spain) Jésus Pareja	3, 8
(Switzerland) Repsol Brun Motorsport	Porsche 962C; Brun C91	Porsche Type-935/82 3.2 L Turbo Flat-6; Judd EV 3.5 L V8	Y	16	(Belgium) Harald Huysman	4
(Switzerland) Repsol Brun Motorsport	Porsche 962C; Brun C91	Porsche Type-935/82 3.2 L Turbo Flat-6; Judd EV 3.5 L V8	Y	16	(Canada) Robbie Stirling	4
(Switzerland) Repsol Brun Motorsport	Porsche 962C; Brun C91	Porsche Type-935/82 3.2 L Turbo Flat-6; Judd EV 3.5 L V8	Y	16	(Switzerland) Gregor Foitek	5, 7
(Switzerland) Repsol Brun Motorsport	Porsche 962C; Brun C91	Porsche Type-935/82 3.2 L Turbo Flat-6; Judd EV 3.5 L V8	Y	17	(Spain) Jésus Pareja	1–2, 4–8
(Switzerland) Repsol Brun Motorsport	Porsche 962C; Brun C91	Porsche Type-935/82 3.2 L Turbo Flat-6; Judd EV 3.5 L V8	Y	17	(Italy) Massimo Sigala	1, 3, 7
(Switzerland) Repsol Brun Motorsport	Porsche 962C; Brun C91	Porsche Type-935/82 3.2 L Turbo Flat-6; Judd EV 3.5 L V8	Y	17	(Switzerland) Walter Brun	2–6
(Switzerland) Repsol Brun Motorsport	Porsche 962C; Brun C91	Porsche Type-935/82 3.2 L Turbo Flat-6; Judd EV 3.5 L V8	Y	17	(Argentina) Oscar Larrauri	4
(Switzerland) Repsol Brun Motorsport	Porsche 962C; Brun C91	Porsche Type-935/82 3.2 L Turbo Flat-6; Judd EV 3.5 L V8	Y	17	(Switzerland) Bernard Santal	8
(Japan) Mazdaspeed	Mazda 787; Mazda 787B	Mazda R26B 2.6 L 4-Rotor	D	18	(Brazil) Maurizio Sandro Sala	1–6, 8
(Japan) Mazdaspeed	Mazda 787; Mazda 787B	Mazda R26B 2.6 L 4-Rotor	D	18	(Republic of Ireland) David Kennedy	1, 3–5
(Japan) Mazdaspeed	Mazda 787; Mazda 787B	Mazda R26B 2.6 L 4-Rotor	D	18	(Belgium) Pierre Dieudonné	2, 6–7
(Japan) Mazdaspeed	Mazda 787; Mazda 787B	Mazda R26B 2.6 L 4-Rotor	D	18	(Sweden) Stefan Johansson	4
(Japan) Mazdaspeed	Mazda 787; Mazda 787B	Mazda R26B 2.6 L 4-Rotor	D	18	(Japan) Yojiro Terada	7–8
(Japan) Mazdaspeed	Mazda 787; Mazda 787B	Mazda R26B 2.6 L 4-Rotor	D	55	(Germany) Volker Weidler	4
(Japan) Mazdaspeed	Mazda 787; Mazda 787B	Mazda R26B 2.6 L 4-Rotor	D	55	(United Kingdom) Johnny Herbert	4
(Japan) Mazdaspeed	Mazda 787; Mazda 787B	Mazda R26B 2.6 L 4-Rotor	D	55	(Belgium) Bertrand Gachot	4
(Japan) Mazdaspeed	Mazda 787; Mazda 787B	Mazda R26B 2.6 L 4-Rotor	D	56	(Japan) Yojiro Terada	4
(Japan) Mazdaspeed	Mazda 787; Mazda 787B	Mazda R26B 2.6 L 4-Rotor	D	56	(Japan) Takashi Yorino	4
(Japan) Mazdaspeed	Mazda 787; Mazda 787B	Mazda R26B 2.6 L 4-Rotor	D	56	(Belgium) Pierre Dieudonné	4
(Japan) Mazdaspeed	Mazda 787; Mazda 787B	Mazda R26B 2.6 L 4-Rotor	D	58	(Japan) Takashi Yorino	1, 8
(Japan) Mazdaspeed	Mazda 787; Mazda 787B	Mazda R26B 2.6 L 4-Rotor	D	58	(Japan) Yojiro Terada	1
(Japan) Mazdaspeed	Mazda 787; Mazda 787B	Mazda R26B 2.6 L 4-Rotor	D	58	(Republic of Ireland) David Kennedy	8
(Austria) Konrad Motorsport	Porsche 962C; Konrad KM-011	Porsche Type-935/82 3.2 L Turbo Flat-6; Lamborghini 3512 3.5 L V12	G Y	21	(Austria) Franz Konrad	2–8
(Austria) Konrad Motorsport	Porsche 962C; Konrad KM-011	Porsche Type-935/82 3.2 L Turbo Flat-6; Lamborghini 3512 3.5 L V12	G Y	21	(Sweden) Stefan Johansson	2, 5–8
(Austria) Konrad Motorsport	Porsche 962C; Konrad KM-011	Porsche Type-935/82 3.2 L Turbo Flat-6; Lamborghini 3512 3.5 L V12	G Y	21	(United Kingdom) Tiff Needell	3
(Austria) Konrad Motorsport	Porsche 962C; Konrad KM-011	Porsche Type-935/82 3.2 L Turbo Flat-6; Lamborghini 3512 3.5 L V12	G Y	21	(United Kingdom) Anthony Reid	4
(Austria) Konrad Motorsport	Porsche 962C; Konrad KM-011	Porsche Type-935/82 3.2 L Turbo Flat-6; Lamborghini 3512 3.5 L V12	G Y	21	(Switzerland) Pierre-Alain Lombardi	4
(Austria) Konrad Motorsport	Porsche 962C; Konrad KM-011	Porsche Type-935/82 3.2 L Turbo Flat-6; Lamborghini 3512 3.5 L V12	G Y	57	(Germany) Bernd Schneider	4
(Austria) Konrad Motorsport	Porsche 962C; Konrad KM-011	Porsche Type-935/82 3.2 L Turbo Flat-6; Lamborghini 3512 3.5 L V12	G Y	57	(France) Henri Pescarolo	4
(Austria) Konrad Motorsport	Porsche 962C; Konrad KM-011	Porsche Type-935/82 3.2 L Turbo Flat-6; Lamborghini 3512 3.5 L V12	G Y	57	(Germany) "John Winter"	4
(Austria) Konrad Motorsport	Porsche 962C; Konrad KM-011	Porsche Type-935/82 3.2 L Turbo Flat-6; Lamborghini 3512 3.5 L V12	G Y	57	(Germany) Harald Becker	5
(Austria) Konrad Motorsport	Porsche 962C; Konrad KM-011	Porsche Type-935/82 3.2 L Turbo Flat-6; Lamborghini 3512 3.5 L V12	G Y	57	(Austria) Franz Konrad	5
(Austria) Konrad Motorsport	Porsche 962C; Konrad KM-011	Porsche Type-935/82 3.2 L Turbo Flat-6; Lamborghini 3512 3.5 L V12	G Y	58	(Germany) Hans-Joachim Stuck	4
(Austria) Konrad Motorsport	Porsche 962C; Konrad KM-011	Porsche Type-935/82 3.2 L Turbo Flat-6; Lamborghini 3512 3.5 L V12	G Y	58	(Germany) Frank Jelinski	4
(Austria) Konrad Motorsport	Porsche 962C; Konrad KM-011	Porsche Type-935/82 3.2 L Turbo Flat-6; Lamborghini 3512 3.5 L V12	G Y	58	(United Kingdom) Derek Bell	4
(Austria) Konrad Motorsport	Porsche 962C; Konrad KM-011	Porsche Type-935/82 3.2 L Turbo Flat-6; Lamborghini 3512 3.5 L V12	G Y	59	(Germany) Jürgen Barth	4
(Austria) Konrad Motorsport	Porsche 962C; Konrad KM-011	Porsche Type-935/82 3.2 L Turbo Flat-6; Lamborghini 3512 3.5 L V12	G Y	59	(Austria) Franz Konrad	4
(Japan) Toyota Team Tom's	Toyota TS010	Toyota RV10 3.5 L V10	G	36	(United Kingdom) Geoff Lees	8
(Japan) Toyota Team Tom's	Toyota TS010	Toyota RV10 3.5 L V10	G	36	(United Kingdom) Andy Wallace	8

Note: As Toyota Team Tom's was not a full-season SWC entrant, the team and drivers were not eligible for championship points.

== Results and standings ==
=== Race results ===
Rnd	Circuit	Winning team	Results
Rnd	Circuit	Winning drivers	Results
1	Suzuka	(France) No. 5 Peugeot Talbot Sport	Report
1	Suzuka	(Italy) Mauro Baldi (France) Philippe Alliot	Report
2	Monza	(United Kingdom) No. 3 Silk Cut Jaguar	Report
2	Monza	(United Kingdom) Derek Warwick (United Kingdom) Martin Brundle	Report
3	Silverstone	(United Kingdom) No. 4 Silk Cut Jaguar	Report
3	Silverstone	(United Kingdom) Derek Warwick (Italy) Teo Fabi	Report
4	Le Mans	(Japan) No. 55 Mazdaspeed	Report
4	Le Mans	(Germany) Volker Weidler (United Kingdom) Johnny Herbert (Belgium) Bertrand Gachot	Report
5	Nürburgring	(United Kingdom) No. 3 Silk Cut Jaguar	Report
5	Nürburgring	(Australia) David Brabham (United Kingdom) Derek Warwick	Report
6	Magny-Cours	(France) No. 6 Peugeot Talbot Sport	Report
6	Magny-Cours	(Finland) Keke Rosberg (France) Yannick Dalmas	Report
7	Mexico City	(France) No. 6 Peugeot Talbot Sport	Report
7	Mexico City	(Finland) Keke Rosberg (France) Yannick Dalmas	Report
8	Autopolis	(Germany) No. 2 Team Sauber-Mercedes	Report
8	Autopolis	(Germany) Michael Schumacher (Austria) Karl Wendlinger	Report

Points system
1st	2nd	3rd	4th	5th	6th	7th	8th	9th	10th
20	15	12	10	8	6	4	3	2	1

In order to be classified for points, a team had to complete 90% of the winner's distance. Further, drivers were required to complete at least 30% of their car's total race distance to qualify for championship points. Drivers forfeited points if they drove in more than one car during the race.

=== Drivers' World Championship ===
Pos	Driver	Team	(Japan) SUZ	(Italy) MON	(United Kingdom) SIL	(France) LMS	(Germany) NUR	(France) MAG	(Mexico) MEX	(Japan) AUT	Points
1	(Italy) Teo Fabi	(United Kingdom) Silk Cut Jaguar	Ret	2	1	3	2	3	DNS	3	86
2	(United Kingdom) Derek Warwick	(United Kingdom) Silk Cut Jaguar	NC	1	1	4	1	5	6	2	79
3	(France) Philippe Alliot	(France) Peugeot Talbot Sport	1	8	6	Ret	Ret	2	2	4	69
3	(Italy) Mauro Baldi	(France) Peugeot Talbot Sport	1	8	6	Ret	Ret	2	2	4	69
4	(Netherlands) Cor Euser	(Netherlands) Euro Racing	4	4	5	Ret	Ret	4	4	6	54
5	(Netherlands) Charles Zwolsman	(Netherlands) Euro Racing	4	4		Ret	Ret	4	4	6	46
6	(Germany) Jochen Mass	(Germany) Team Sauber-Mercedes	2	3	4	Ret	Ret	Ret	Ret	5	45
6	(France) Jean-Louis Schlesser	(Germany) Team Sauber Mercedes	2	3	4	Ret	Ret	Ret	Ret	5	45
7	(Germany) Michael Schumacher	(Germany) Team Sauber-Mercedes	Ret	Ret	2	5	Ret	Ret	Ret	1	43
7	(Austria) Karl Wendlinger	(Germany) Team Sauber-Mercedes	Ret	Ret	2	5	Ret	Ret	Ret	1	43
8	(Germany) Manuel Reuter	(Germany) Porsche Kremer Racing	3	5	8	9	3	6	Ret	Ret	43
9	(Finland) Harri Toivonen	(Germany) Porsche Kremer Racing	3	5	8	9	3	6		Ret	41
10	(Finland) Keke Rosberg	(France) Peugeot Talbot Sport	Ret	Ret	Ret	Ret	Ret	1	1	Ret	40
10	(France) Yannick Dalmas	(France) Peugeot Talbot Sport	Ret	Ret	Ret	Ret	Ret	1	1	Ret	40
11	(Brazil) Maurizio Sandro Sala	(Japan) Mazdaspeed	6	7	11	6	5	7		8	31
12	(United Kingdom) Johnny Herbert	(Japan) Mazdaspeed				1					20
12	(Germany) Volker Weidler	(Japan) Mazdaspeed				1					20
13	(Australia) David Brabham	(United Kingdom) Silk Cut Jaguar					1	3	6	3	18
14	(Republic of Ireland) David Kennedy	(Japan) Mazdaspeed	6		11	6	5			9	16
15	(Spain) Jésus Pareja	(Switzerland) Repsol Brun Motorsport	7	Ret	7	10	7	NC	8	Ret	16
16	(United States) Davy Jones	(United Kingdom) Silk Cut Jaguar				2					15
16	(Brazil) Raul Boesel	(United Kingdom) Silk Cut Jaguar				2					15
17	(United Kingdom) Martin Brundle	(United Kingdom) Silk Cut Jaguar	Ret	1	3						12
17	(United Kingdom) Kenny Acheson	(United Kingdom) Silk Cut Jaguar				3					12
17	(France) Bob Wollek	(United Kingdom) Silk Cut Jaguar				3					12
17	(Germany) Bernd Schneider	(Austria) Konrad Motorsport				Ret					12
17	(Germany) Bernd Schneider	(Switzerland) Team Salamin Primagaz							3		12
18	(Sweden) Steven Andskär	(France) Courage Compétition	5			Ret				7	12
18	(South Africa) George Fouché	(France) Courage Compétition	5			Ret				7	12
19	(France) Lionel Robert	(France) Courage Compétition		9		11	6	Ret	7		12
20	(Germany) Otto Altenbach	(Switzerland) Team Salamin Primagaz				Ret	4	10			11
21	(Argentina) Oscar Larrauri	(Switzerland) Repsol Brun Motorsport	DSQ	6	7	10	DNS	Ret	Ret	Ret	11
21	(Italy) Massimo Sigala	(Switzerland) Repsol Brun Motorsport	7	6	10				8		11
22	(Denmark) John Nielsen	(United Kingdom) Silk Cut Jaguar				4					10
22	(Germany) Jürgen Oppermann	(Switzerland) Team Salamin Primagaz					4				10
23	(Belgium) Pierre Dieudonné	(Japan) Mazdaspeed		7		8		7	9		10
24	(United Kingdom) Derek Bell	(Austria) Konrad Motorsport				7					8
24	(United Kingdom) Derek Bell	(Switzerland) Team Salamin Primagaz							5		8
24	(Italy) Gianpiero Moretti	(Switzerland) Team Salamin Primagaz							5		8
25	(Sweden) Stefan Johansson	(Austria) Konrad Motorsport		Ret			DNQ	Ret	Ret	Ret	6
25	(Sweden) Stefan Johansson	(Japan) Mazdaspeed				6					6
26	(Switzerland) Walter Brun	(Switzerland) Repsol Brun Motorsport		Ret	10	8	7	Ret			5
27	(Japan) Yojiro Terada	(Japan) Mazdaspeed	NC			8			9	8	5
27	(Japan) Takashi Yorino	(Japan) Mazdaspeed	NC			8				9	5
28	(Germany) Hans-Joachim Stuck	(Austria) Konrad Motorsport				7					4
28	(Germany) Frank Jelinski	(Austria) Konrad Motorsport				7					4
28	(France) Pascal Fabre	(France) Louis Descartes				Ret		Ret			4
28	(France) Pascal Fabre	(France) Courage Compétition							7		4
29	(Italy) Paolo Barilla	(France) Courage Compétition	8							WD	3
29	(Sweden) Eje Elgh	(France) Courage Compétition	8							WD	3
29	(Sweden) Eje Elgh	(Switzerland) Team Salamin Primagaz			Ret	Ret				Ret	3
29	(Germany) Otto Rensing	(Germany) Porsche Kremer Racing					8				3
29	(Austria) Mercedes Stermitz	(France) Louis Descartes			DNS						3
29	(Austria) Mercedes Stermitz	(Switzerland) Team Salamin Primagaz				DNQ					3
29	(Austria) Mercedes Stermitz	(Germany) Porsche Kremer Racing					8				3
29	(Mexico) Tomas Lopez	(Germany) Porsche Kremer Racing				Ret		8	Ret		3
29	(Switzerland) Gregor Foitek	(Germany) Porsche Kremer Racing				Ret		8			3
29	(Switzerland) Gregor Foitek	(Switzerland) Repsol Brun Motorsport					DNS		Ret		3
30	(France) François Migault	(France) Courage Compétition		9	Ret	11	6	Ret	10		3
30	(Canada) Claude Bourbonnais	(France) Courage Compétition		10	9	NC					3
30	(France) Michel Trollé	(France) Courage Compétition		10	9	NC					3
31	(Switzerland) Antoine Salamin	(Switzerland) Team Salamin Primagaz	9	Ret	NC	Ret	NC				2
31	(Morocco) Max Cohen-Olivar	(Switzerland) Team Salamin Primagaz	9	Ret	NC	Ret					2
31	(Austria) Franz Konrad	(Austria) Konrad Motorsport		Ret	Ret	Ret	9	Ret	Ret	Ret	2
31	(Germany) Harald Becker	(Austria) Konrad Motorsport					9				2
31	(Italy) Marco Brand	(Italy) Veneto Equipe	DNQ	Ret							2
31	(Italy) Marco Brand	(France) Courage Compétition			Ret	NC	Ret	9			2
31	(France) Denis Morin	(France) Courage Compétition						9			2
32	(Germany) Jürgen Lässig	(Switzerland) Team Salamin Primagaz						10			1
32	(Spain) Tomás Saldaña	(France) Courage Compétition							9		1
Pos	Driver	Team	(Japan) SUZ	(Italy) MON	(United Kingdom) SIL	(France) LMS	(Germany) NUR	(France) MAG	(Mexico) MEX	(Japan) AUT	Points

Colour	Result
Gold	Winner
Silver	Second place
Bronze	Third place
Green	Points classification
Blue	Non-points classification
Blue	Non-classified finish (NC)
Purple	Retired, not classified (Ret)
Red	Did not qualify (DNQ)
Red	Did not pre-qualify (DNPQ)
Black	Disqualified (DSQ)
White	Did not start (DNS)
White	Withdrew (WD)
White	Race cancelled (C)
Blank	Did not practice (DNP)
Blank	Did not arrive (DNA)
Blank	Excluded (EX)

=== Teams' World Championship ===
Teams only scored points for their highest finishing entry.

Pos	Team	(Japan) SUZ	(Italy) MON	(United Kingdom) SIL	(France) LMS	(Germany) NUR	(France) MAG	(Mexico) MEX	(Japan) AUT	Points
1	(United Kingdom) Silk Cut Jaguar	NC	1	1	2	1	3	6	2	108
2	(France) Peugeot Talbot Sport	1	8	6	Ret	Ret	1	1	4	79
3	(Germany) Team Sauber-Mercedes	2	3	2	5	Ret	Ret	Ret	1	70
4	(Netherlands) Euro Racing	4	4	5	12	Ret	4	4	6	54
5	(Japan) Mazdaspeed	6	7	11	1	5	7	9	8	47
6	(Germany) Porsche Kremer Racing	3	5	8	9	3	8	Ret	Ret	43
7	(France) Courage Compétition	5	9	9	11	6	9	7	7	28
8	(Switzerland) Team Salamin Primagaz	9	Ret	NC	NC	4	10	3	Ret	25
9	(Switzerland) Repsol Brun Motorsport	7	6	7	10	7	NC	8	Ret	22
10	(Austria) Konrad Motorsport		Ret	Ret	7	9	Ret	Ret	Ret	6
