= 1991 430 km of Mexico City =

Layout of the Autódromo Hermanos Rodríguez (1986–2014)

The 1991 430 km of Mexico City was the seventh round of the 1991 World Sportscar Championship season, taking place at Autodromo Hermanos Rodriguez, Mexico. It took place on October 6, 1991.

== Official results ==
Class winners in bold. Cars failing to complete 90% of the winner's distance marked as Not Classified (NC).

Pos	Class	No	Team	Drivers	Chassis	Tyre	Laps
Pos	Class	No	Team	Drivers	Engine	Tyre	Laps
1	**C1**	**6**	**(France) Peugeot Talbot Sport**	**(Finland) Keke Rosberg (France) Yannick Dalmas**	**Peugeot 905 Evo 1B**	MI	**98**
1	**C1**	**6**	**(France) Peugeot Talbot Sport**	**(Finland) Keke Rosberg (France) Yannick Dalmas**	**Peugeot SA35 3.5L V10**	MI	**98**
2	C1	5	(France) Peugeot Talbot Sport	(Italy) Mauro Baldi (France) Philippe Alliot	Peugeot 905 Evo 1B	MI	97
2	C1	5	(France) Peugeot Talbot Sport	(Italy) Mauro Baldi (France) Philippe Alliot	Peugeot SA35 3.5L V10	MI	97
3	**C2**	**14**	**(Switzerland) Team Salamin Primagaz (Germany) Joest Racing**	**(Germany) Bernd Schneider (Germany) "John Winter"**	**Porsche 962C**	G	**94**
3	**C2**	**14**	**(Switzerland) Team Salamin Primagaz (Germany) Joest Racing**	**(Germany) Bernd Schneider (Germany) "John Winter"**	**Porsche Type-935 3.2L Turbo Flat-6**	G	**94**
4	C1	8	(Netherlands) Euro Racing	(Netherlands) Cor Euser (Netherlands) Charles Zwolsman Sr.	Spice SE90C	G	93
4	C1	8	(Netherlands) Euro Racing	(Netherlands) Cor Euser (Netherlands) Charles Zwolsman Sr.	Ford Cosworth DFR 3.5L V8	G	93
5	C2	59	(Switzerland) Team Salamin Primagaz (Germany) Joest Racing	(United Kingdom) Derek Bell (Italy) Gianpiero Moretti	Porsche 962C	G	92
5	C2	59	(Switzerland) Team Salamin Primagaz (Germany) Joest Racing	(United Kingdom) Derek Bell (Italy) Gianpiero Moretti	Porsche Type-935 3.2L Turbo Flat-6	G	92
6	C1	3	(United Kingdom) Silk Cut Jaguar	(United Kingdom) Derek Warwick (Australia) David Brabham	Jaguar XJR-14	G	92
6	C1	3	(United Kingdom) Silk Cut Jaguar	(United Kingdom) Derek Warwick (Australia) David Brabham	Cosworth HB 3.5L V8	G	92
7	C2	13	(France) Courage Compétition	(France) Pascal Fabre (France) Lionel Robert	Cougar C26S	G	90
7	C2	13	(France) Courage Compétition	(France) Pascal Fabre (France) Lionel Robert	Porsche Type-935 3.2L Turbo Flat-6	G	90
8	C2	17	(Switzerland) Repsol Brun Motorsport	(Spain) Jesús Pareja (Italy) Massimo Sigala	Porsche 962C	Y	89
8	C2	17	(Switzerland) Repsol Brun Motorsport	(Spain) Jesús Pareja (Italy) Massimo Sigala	Porsche Type-935 3.2L Turbo Flat-6	Y	89
9	C2	18	(Japan) Mazdaspeed	(Belgium) Pierre Dieudonné (Japan) Yojiro Terada	Mazda 787	D	89
9	C2	18	(Japan) Mazdaspeed	(Belgium) Pierre Dieudonné (Japan) Yojiro Terada	Mazda R26B 2.6L 4-Rotor	D	89
10	C2	12	(France) Courage Compétition	(France) François Migault (Spain) Tomás Saldaña	Cougar C26S	G	88
10	C2	12	(France) Courage Compétition	(France) François Migault (Spain) Tomás Saldaña	Porsche Type-935 3.2L Turbo Flat-6	G	88
11 DNF	C1	1	(Germany) Team Sauber Mercedes	(Germany) Jochen Mass (France) Jean-Louis Schlesser	Mercedes-Benz C291	G	80
11 DNF	C1	1	(Germany) Team Sauber Mercedes	(Germany) Jochen Mass (France) Jean-Louis Schlesser	Mercedes-Benz M291 3.5L Flat-12	G	80
12 DNF	C1	2	(Germany) Team Sauber Mercedes	(Austria) Karl Wendlinger (Germany) Michael Schumacher	Mercedes-Benz C291	G	63
12 DNF	C1	2	(Germany) Team Sauber Mercedes	(Austria) Karl Wendlinger (Germany) Michael Schumacher	Mercedes-Benz M291 3.5L Flat-12	G	63
13 DNF	C1	21	(Austria) Konrad Motorsport	(Austria) Franz Konrad (Sweden) Stefan Johansson	Konrad KM-011	Y	36
13 DNF	C1	21	(Austria) Konrad Motorsport	(Austria) Franz Konrad (Sweden) Stefan Johansson	Lamborghini 3512 3.5L V12	Y	36
14 DNF	C1	16	(Switzerland) Repsol Brun Motorsport	(Argentina) Oscar Larrauri	Brun C91	Y	31
14 DNF	C1	16	(Switzerland) Repsol Brun Motorsport	(Argentina) Oscar Larrauri	Judd EV 3.5L V8	Y	31
15 DNF	C2	11	(Germany) Porsche Kremer Racing	(Germany) Manuel Reuter (Mexico) Tomas Lopez	Porsche 962CK6	Y	19
15 DNF	C2	11	(Germany) Porsche Kremer Racing	(Germany) Manuel Reuter (Mexico) Tomas Lopez	Porsche Type-935 3.2L Turbo Flat-6	Y	19
16 DNF	C1	7	(France) Louis Descartes	(Italy) Luigi Taverna (France) Patrick Gonin	ALD C91	G	1
16 DNF	C1	7	(France) Louis Descartes	(Italy) Luigi Taverna (France) Patrick Gonin	Ford Cosworth DFR 3.5L V8	G	1
DNS	C1	4	(United Kingdom) Silk Cut Jaguar	(Italy) Teo Fabi	Jaguar XJR-14	G	-
DNS	C1	4	(United Kingdom) Silk Cut Jaguar	(Italy) Teo Fabi	Cosworth HB 3.5L V8	G	-

== Statistics ==
- Pole Position - Philippe Alliot (#5 Peugeot Talbot Sport) - 1:19.229
- Fastest Lap - Michael Schumacher (#2 Team Sauber Mercedes) - 1:21.611
- Average Speed - 173.964 km/h

World Sportscar Championship
Previous race: 1991 430km of Magny-Cours	1991 season	Next race: 1991 430km of Autopolis
