= 1991 430 km of Autopolis =

Layout of the Autopolis

The 1991 430 km of Autopolis was the eighth and final round of the 1991 World Sportscar Championship season, taking place at Autopolis, Japan. It took place on October 28, 1991.

== Official results ==
Class winners in bold. Cars failing to complete 90% of the winner's distance marked as Not Classified (NC).

Pos	Class	No	Team	Drivers	Chassis	Tyre	Laps
Pos	Class	No	Team	Drivers	Engine	Tyre	Laps
1	**C1**	**2**	**(Germany) Team Sauber Mercedes**	**(Austria) Karl Wendlinger (Germany) Michael Schumacher**	**Mercedes-Benz C291**	G	**93**
1	**C1**	**2**	**(Germany) Team Sauber Mercedes**	**(Austria) Karl Wendlinger (Germany) Michael Schumacher**	**Mercedes-Benz M291 3.5L Flat-12**	G	**93**
2	C1	3	(United Kingdom) Silk Cut Jaguar	(United Kingdom) Derek Warwick	Jaguar XJR-14	G	93
2	C1	3	(United Kingdom) Silk Cut Jaguar	(United Kingdom) Derek Warwick	Cosworth HB 3.5L V8	G	93
3	C1	4	(United Kingdom) Silk Cut Jaguar	(Italy) Teo Fabi (Australia) David Brabham	Jaguar XJR-14	G	93
3	C1	4	(United Kingdom) Silk Cut Jaguar	(Italy) Teo Fabi (Australia) David Brabham	Cosworth HB 3.5L V8	G	93
4	C1	5	(France) Peugeot Talbot Sport	(Italy) Mauro Baldi (France) Philippe Alliot	Peugeot 905 Evo 1B	MI	92
4	C1	5	(France) Peugeot Talbot Sport	(Italy) Mauro Baldi (France) Philippe Alliot	Peugeot SA35 3.5L V10	MI	92
5	C1	1	(Germany) Team Sauber Mercedes	(Germany) Jochen Mass (France) Jean-Louis Schlesser	Mercedes-Benz C291	G	92
5	C1	1	(Germany) Team Sauber Mercedes	(Germany) Jochen Mass (France) Jean-Louis Schlesser	Mercedes-Benz M291 3.5L Flat-12	G	92
6	C1	36	(Japan) Toyota Team Tom's	(United Kingdom) Geoff Lees (United Kingdom) Andy Wallace	Toyota TS010	G	90
6	C1	36	(Japan) Toyota Team Tom's	(United Kingdom) Geoff Lees (United Kingdom) Andy Wallace	Toyota RV10 3.5L V10	G	90
7	C1	8	(Netherlands) Euro Racing	(Netherlands) Cor Euser (Netherlands) Charles Zwolsman Sr.	Spice SE90C	G	87
7	C1	8	(Netherlands) Euro Racing	(Netherlands) Cor Euser (Netherlands) Charles Zwolsman Sr.	Ford Cosworth DFR 3.5L V8	G	87
8	**C2**	**12**	**(France) Courage Compétition (Japan) Nisseki Racing Team**	**(South Africa) George Fouché (Sweden) Steven Andskär**	**Porsche 962C GTi**	D	**85**
8	**C2**	**12**	**(France) Courage Compétition (Japan) Nisseki Racing Team**	**(South Africa) George Fouché (Sweden) Steven Andskär**	**Porsche Type-935 3.2L Turbo Flat-6**	D	**85**
9	C2	18	(Japan) Mazdaspeed	(Brazil) Maurizio Sandro Sala (Japan) Yojiro Terada	Mazda 787B	D	85
9	C2	18	(Japan) Mazdaspeed	(Brazil) Maurizio Sandro Sala (Japan) Yojiro Terada	Mazda R26B 2.6L 4-Rotor	D	85
10	C2	58	(Japan) Mazdaspeed	(Republic of Ireland) David Kennedy (Japan) Takashi Yorino	Mazda 787B	D	84
10	C2	58	(Japan) Mazdaspeed	(Republic of Ireland) David Kennedy (Japan) Takashi Yorino	Mazda R26B 2.6L 4-Rotor	D	84
11 DNF	C2	14	(Switzerland) Team Salamin Primagaz (Australia) Team Schuppan	(Austria) Roland Ratzenberger (Sweden) Eje Elgh	Porsche 962C	D	78
11 DNF	C2	14	(Switzerland) Team Salamin Primagaz (Australia) Team Schuppan	(Austria) Roland Ratzenberger (Sweden) Eje Elgh	Porsche Type-935 3.2L Turbo Flat-6	D	78
12 DNF	C2	11	(Germany) Porsche Kremer Racing	(Germany) Manuel Reuter (Finland) Harri Toivonen	Porsche 962CK6	Y	45
12 DNF	C2	11	(Germany) Porsche Kremer Racing	(Germany) Manuel Reuter (Finland) Harri Toivonen	Porsche Type-935 3.2L Turbo Flat-6	Y	45
13 DNF	C1	21	(Austria) Konrad Motorsport	(Austria) Franz Konrad (Sweden) Stefan Johansson	Konrad KM-011	Y	24
13 DNF	C1	21	(Austria) Konrad Motorsport	(Austria) Franz Konrad (Sweden) Stefan Johansson	Lamborghini 3512 3.5L V12	Y	24
14 DNF	C1	6	(France) Peugeot Talbot Sport	(Finland) Keke Rosberg (France) Yannick Dalmas	Peugeot 905 Evo 1B	MI	20
14 DNF	C1	6	(France) Peugeot Talbot Sport	(Finland) Keke Rosberg (France) Yannick Dalmas	Peugeot SA35 3.5L V10	MI	20
15 DNF	C1	16	(Switzerland) Repsol Brun Motorsport	(Argentina) Oscar Larrauri	Brun C91	Y	20
15 DNF	C1	16	(Switzerland) Repsol Brun Motorsport	(Argentina) Oscar Larrauri	Judd EV 3.5L V8	Y	20
16 DNF	C2	17	(Switzerland) Repsol Brun Motorsport	(Spain) Jesús Pareja (Switzerland) Bernard Santal	Porsche 962C	Y	12
16 DNF	C2	17	(Switzerland) Repsol Brun Motorsport	(Spain) Jesús Pareja (Switzerland) Bernard Santal	Porsche Type-935 3.2L Turbo Flat-6	Y	12
17 DNF	C1	61	(Netherlands) Euro Racing	(South Africa) Wayne Taylor (Japan) Hideshi Matsuda	Spice SE90C	G	3
17 DNF	C1	61	(Netherlands) Euro Racing	(South Africa) Wayne Taylor (Japan) Hideshi Matsuda	Ford DFR 3.5L V8	G	3

== Statistics ==
- Pole Position - Teo Fabi (#4 Silk Cut Jaguar) - 1:27.188
- Fastest Lap - Yannick Dalmas (#6 Peugeot Talbot Sport) - 1:30.615
- Average Speed - 177.891 km/h

World Sportscar Championship
Previous race: 1991 430km of Mexico City	1991 season	Next race: None
