= Marco Brand =

Italian racing driver

Marco Brand (born 31 May 1957 in Milan) is a former Italian racing driver, winner of the 1988 Monza Rally Show.

== Complete Italian Superturismo Championship results ==
Year	Team	Car	1	2	3	4	5	6	7	8	9	10	11	12	13	14	15	16	17	18	19	20	DC	Pts
1994	Euroteam	Alfa Romeo 155 TS	MNZ; 1 Ret	MNZ; 2 DNS	VAL; 1 Ret	VAL; 2 Ret	MAG; 1 Ret	MAG; 2; 12	BIN; 1; 8	BIN; 2; 6	MIS; 1; 7	MIS; 2; 9	VAL; 1; 9	VAL; 2; 11	MUG; 1 DSQ	MUG; 2; 7	PER; 1	PER; 2	VAR; 1; 4	VAR; 2; 12	MUG; 1; 5	MUG; 2 Ret	12th	39
1996	Ciemme Corse	Opel Vectra	MUG; 1 Ret	MUG; 2; 7	MAG; 1 Ret	MAG; 2 DNS	MNZ; 1; 6	MNZ; 2; 6	BIN; 1	BIN; 2	MIS; 1	MIS; 2	IMO; 1	IMO; 2	PER; 1	PER; 2	PER; 1	PER; 2	VAR; 1	VAR; 2	VAL; 1	VAL; 2	16th	16
