= Lionel Robert =

French racing driver (born 1962)

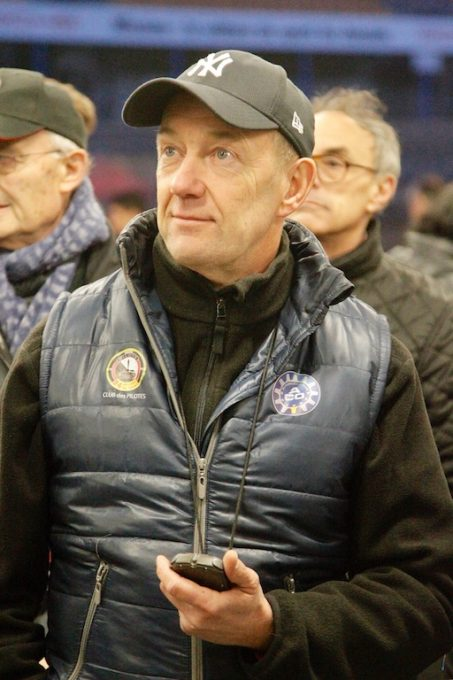
Lionel Robert in 2017

Lionel Robert (born 20 April 1962 in Le Mans) is a French former racing driver.
