= Antoine Salamin =

Swiss racing driver (born 1945)

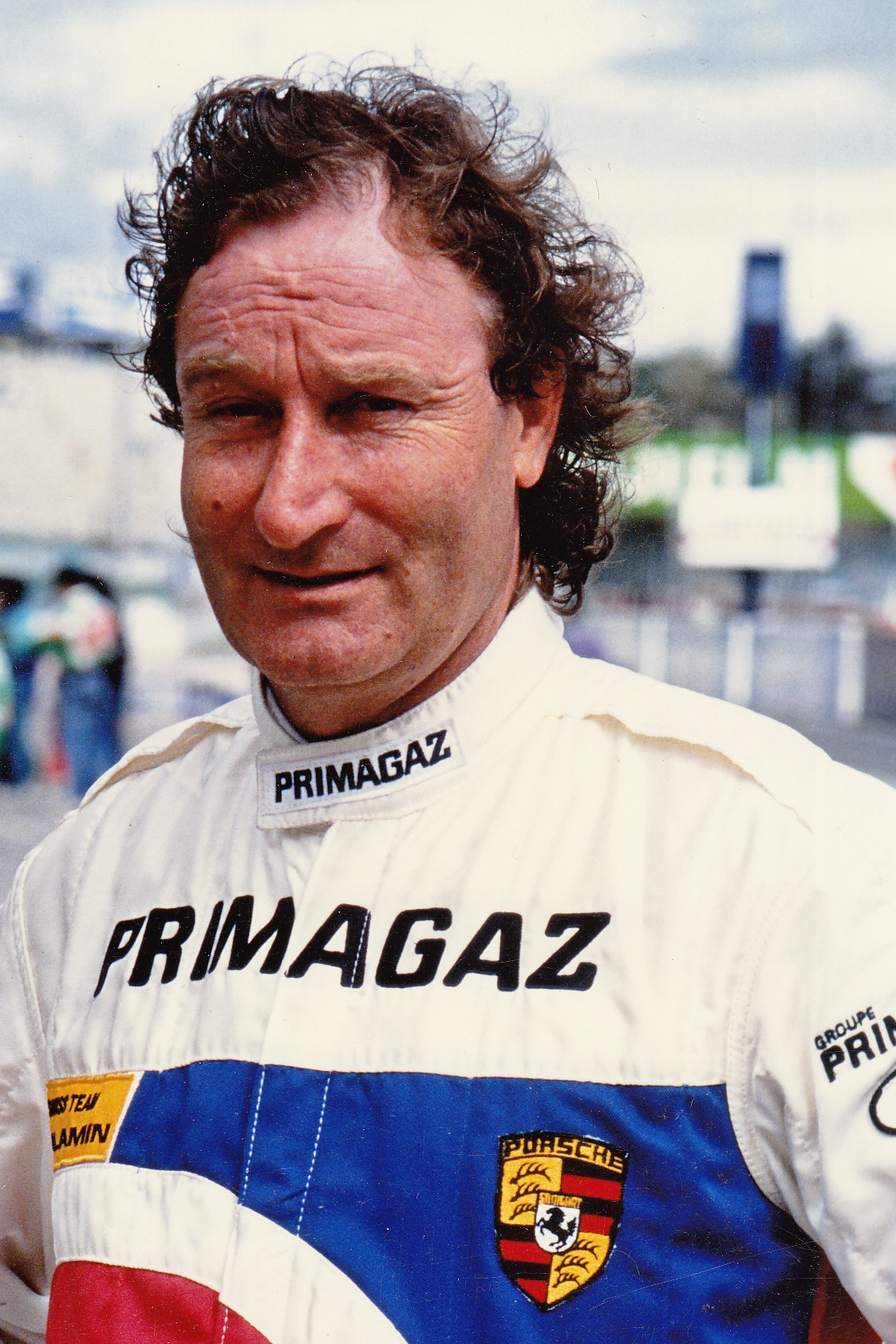
Antoine Salamin at Suzuka 1991

Antoine Salamin (born 19 December 1945) is an architect and Swiss former racing driver.

== Racing career ==
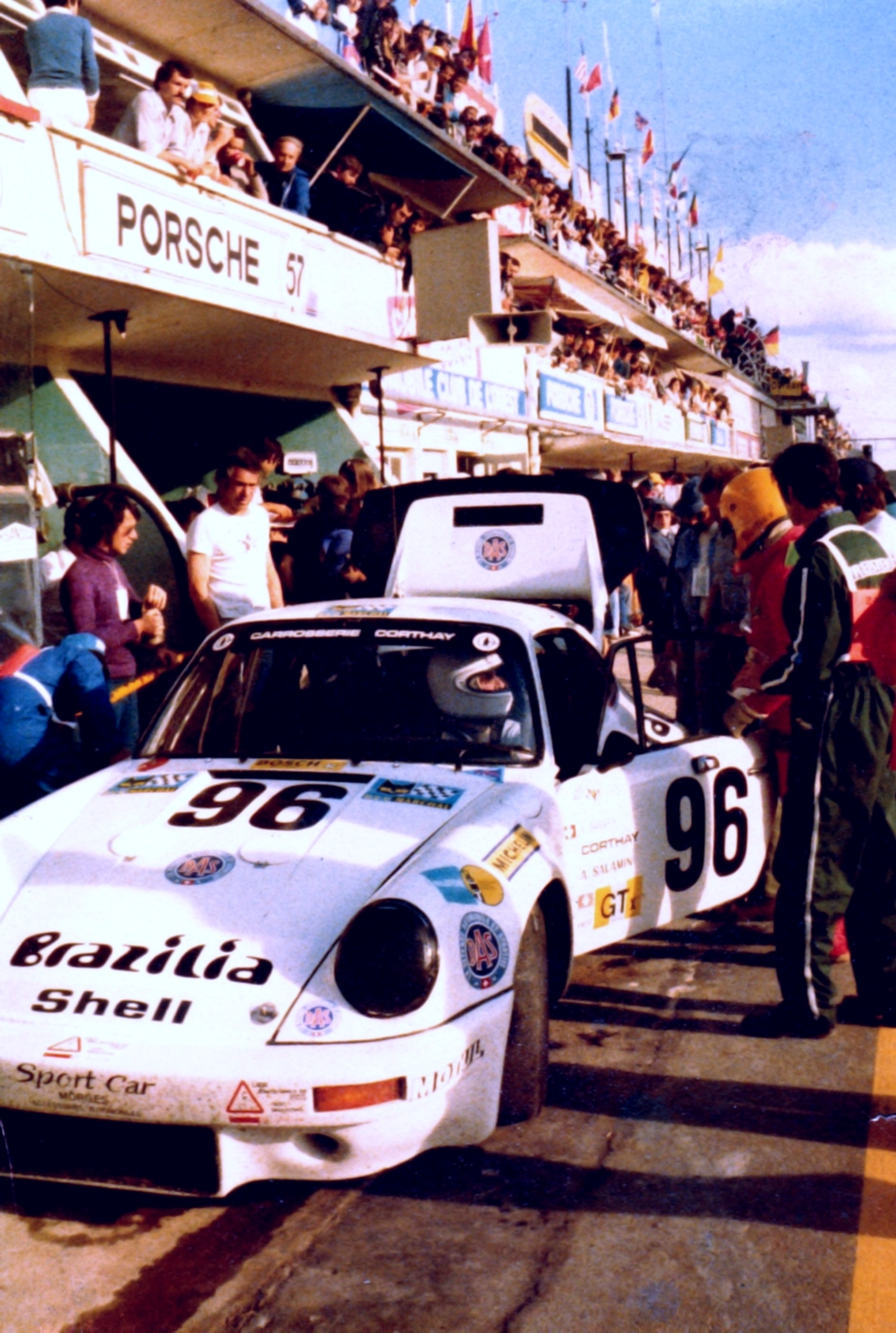
Le Mans 1977: leading GTX class until engine failure (3 hours before the end of the race)

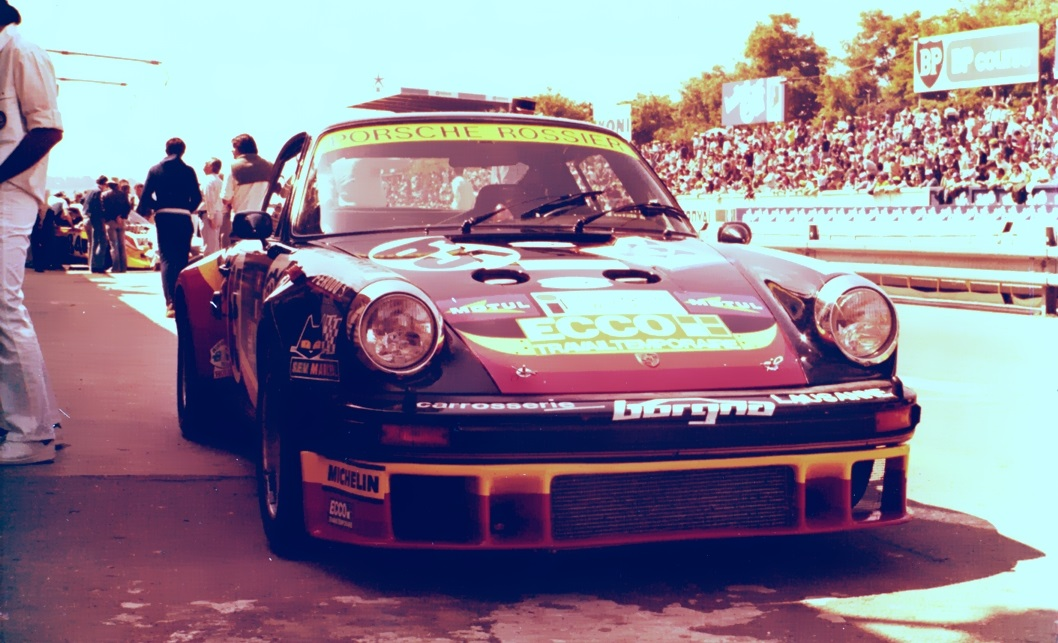
Le Mans 1978: retirement after tyre defect (Co-driver Yves Courage was on board)

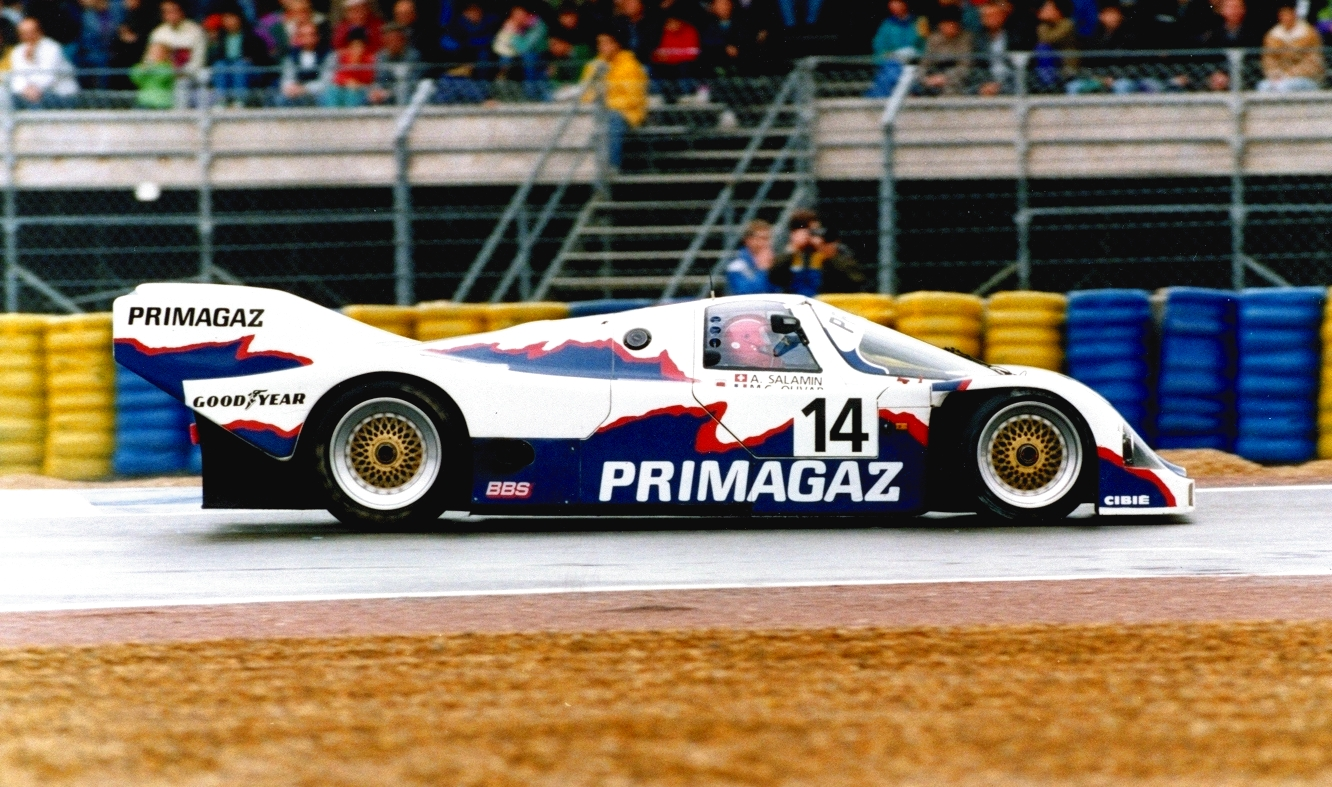
Le Mans 1991: with the Porsche 962C Primagaz

Champion of Switzerland in 1985, he participates in the World Sportscar Championship as a driver and with his own team from 1977 to 1979 and from 1988 to 1991.

With four participations in the 24 Hours of Le Mans, seventh place in 1988 and eighth in 1991 in the World Sportscar Championship for teams, Antoine Salamin confirms his international stature.

In addition to regular rankings in the European Interserie Cup and the German Supercup Championship (podiums), the 1988 season is punctuated by its seventh place in the Porsche World Cup.

An eclectic driver, he is also involved in rally (Rallye du Vin, du Haut-Valais, Lyon-Charbonnières) on Ford Escort RS 2000, Opel and Porsche, in rally-raid (Paris-Dakar 1982 where he is seventh overall before his retirement at Gao) on Toyota Hilux, Antoine Salamin was distinguished above all by his loyalty to Porsche.

He has notably driven the following cars: Porsche Carrera 2.7 RS, Porsche Carrera 3.0 RS, Porsche Turbo 930, Porsche 934, Porsche 935, Porsche 962C and Porsche 997 GT3 RS (1st of the Porsche Swiss Cup in circuit ranking in 2011). In 1987, he has driven a Sauber Sehcar C6 with a Ford Cosworth engine and in 1983 he participated in the 3 hours of Hockenheim in "Sport 2000".

His racing driver career began in 1973 and ended in 1998 with Hockenheim's 3 hours victory.

He created the Swiss Team Salamin, independent structure, becoming for the 1991 season, Team Salamin Primagaz. Driver and sporting director, he officiated at this last post in Ferrari Challenge in the mid-1990s and in some events in 1998 (in FIA GT Championship).

== Race tracks in Switzerland ==
As an architect, he designs three projects of race tracks in Switzerland.

In 1985, the Swiss Grand Prix was reborn in Sion (it missed only one vote at the Federal Council to authorize this punctual race on a temporary track located on the Airport of Sion).

A project of a permanent alpine track, in 1996, on the airfield of Rarogne failed during the popular vote of the commune which followed.

Finally, at the dawn of the year 2000, the project of Alternative Technological Center, intended to promote and experiment new automotive technologies, to Chamoson seemed to bring together all the qualities. The population of the municipality voted in 2004 in favor of the project, for the first time in Switzerland, to 75% of the votes.

== Racing record ==
=== 24 Hours of Le Mans results ===
Year	Car	Class	Team	Drivers	Pos
1977	Porsche 911 Carrera; 6 cyl. 3.0 L Nr. 96	GTX	(Switzerland) GVEA - G. Haberthur	(Switzerland) Antoine Salamin (Switzerland) André Savary (Switzerland) Jean-Robert Corthay	Retirement: engine (20th hour, 18th at general classification and 1st in GTX class)
1978	Porsche 930 turbo 6 cyl. 3.3 L Nr. 65	Gr. IV	(France) Joël Laplacette	(Switzerland) Antoine Salamin (Switzerland) Gérard Vial (France) Yves Courage (France) Joël Laplacette	Retirement: tyre defect (11th hour, 32nd at general classification)
1979	Porsche 934 turbo 6 cyl. 3.0 L Nr. 80	GT (Gr. IV)	(Switzerland) Écurie 13 Étoiles	(Switzerland) Antoine Salamin (Switzerland) Gérard Vial (Switzerland) Philippe Collet	Did not qualify (only Salamin qualified)
1991	Porsche 962C double turbo 6 cyl. 3.2 L Nr. 14	S2	(Switzerland) Team Salamin Primagaz	(Switzerland) Antoine Salamin (France) Max Cohen-Olivar (France) Marcel Tarrès	Retirement: engine (8th hour, 20th at general classification)

=== World Sportscar Championship results ===
Results classification for teams
Year	Team	Chassis	Engine	Drivers	Races	Points	Pos
1978	(Switzerland) Écurie 13 Étoiles	Porsche 930	Porsche; 3.3 L turbo 6 cyl.	(Switzerland) Antoine Salamin (Switzerland) Gérard Vial	2	0	not classified
1979	(Switzerland) Écurie 13 Étoiles	Porsche 934	Porsche; 3.0 L turbo 6 cyl.	(Switzerland) Antoine Salamin (Switzerland) Gérard Vial (Switzerland) Philippe Collet	4	0	not classified
1988	(Switzerland) Swiss Team Salamin	Porsche 962C	Porsche; 2.8 L turbo Flat-6	(Switzerland) Antoine Salamin (Italy) Giovanni Lavaggi (France) Max Cohen-Olivar	9	38	7th
1989	(Switzerland) Swiss Team Salamin	Porsche 962C	Porsche; 3.0 L turbo Flat-6	(Switzerland) Antoine Salamin (France) Max Cohen-Olivar (Italy) Giovanni Lavaggi	6	0	not classified
1990	(Switzerland) Swiss Team Salamin	Porsche 962C	Porsche; 3.2 L turbo Flat-6	(Switzerland) Antoine Salamin (Italy) Luigi Taverna (France) Max Cohen-Olivar	8	0	not classified
1991	(Switzerland) Team Salamin Primagaz	Porsche 962C	Porsche; 3.2 L turbo Flat-6	(Switzerland) Antoine Salamin (France) Max Cohen-Olivar	8	25	8th

=== European Interserie Cup results ===
Results classification for drivers division I
Year	Team	Chassis	Engine	Driver	Races	Podiums	Points	Pos
1983	(Switzerland) Écurie 13 Étoiles	Porsche 935	Porsche double turbo	(Switzerland) Antoine Salamin	1	0	3	29th
1987	(Switzerland) Swiss Team Salamin	Porsche 962C; Sehcar C6	Porsche; Ford	(Switzerland) Antoine Salamin	2	0	11	12th
1988	(Switzerland) Swiss Team Salamin	Porsche 962C	Porsche turbo Flat-6	(Switzerland) Antoine Salamin	4	3	42	4th
1989	(Switzerland) Swiss Team Salamin	Porsche 962C	Porsche turbo Flat-6	(Switzerland) Antoine Salamin	2	1	17	7th

=== Super Cup results ===
Results classification for drivers
Year	Team	Chassis	Engine	Driver	Races	Points	Pos
1987	(Switzerland) Team Decorplast	Sehcar C6	Ford; V8	(Switzerland) Antoine Salamin	2	2	14th
1988	(Switzerland) Swiss Team Salamin	Porsche 962C	Porsche turbo Flat-6	(Switzerland) Antoine Salamin	5	11	8th
1989	(Switzerland) Swiss Team Salamin	Porsche 962C	Porsche turbo Flat-6	(Switzerland) Antoine Salamin	5	12	6th

=== Other international events ===
Results classification for drivers
Date	Team	Chassis	Engine	Driver	Race	Practice	Race results
28 November 1987	(Switzerland) Swiss Team Salamin	Porsche 962C	Porsche turbo Flat-6	(Switzerland) Antoine Salamin	Int. Kyalami 500	13	6th
26 November 1988	(Switzerland) Swiss Team Salamin	Porsche 962C	Porsche turbo Flat-6	(Switzerland) Antoine Salamin	Int. Kyalami 500	8	11th
3 October 1998	(Switzerland) Swiss Team Salamin	Porsche 962C	Porsche turbo Flat-6	(Switzerland) Antoine Salamin	Int. Hockenheim 3 Std	1	1st

== Awards ==
- Champion of Switzerland in 1985 (Porsche 935)
- Vice-Champion of Switzerland in 1981 and 1984; 2nd of Interswiss in 1986 (Porsche 935)
- 18th of the World Porsche-Cup classification in 1985 (Porsche 935)
- 7th of the World Porsche-Cup classification in 1988 (Porsche 962C)
