= Harri Toivonen =

Finnish rally driver (born 1960)

Harri Toivonen (born 22 October 1960) is a Finnish former rally and race car driver. He is the younger brother of the late Henri Toivonen and son of Pauli Toivonen.

== Rally career ==
Toivonen's first World Rally Championship outcome was at the 1980 1000 Lakes Rally in Finland driving a Chrysler Avenger, former car of his brother Henri.

In 1983, Toivonen drove a Mitsubishi Lancer Turbo, mainly for the Finnish Junior Rally Team. In 1986, he came to a deal with the Austin Rover works team to drive the British Rally open in an MG Metro 6R4. While competing at the Wales Rally in early May, he heard the news of his brother's accident at the Tour de Corse which cost Henri and co-driver Sergio Cresto their lives.

Toivonen continued competing later that year. He drove his Metro to eighth place at the 1000 Lakes Rally, but retired at the UK's RAC Rally in November. The rally his brother Henri won one year earlier.

After some unsuccessful years in rallying after 1986, Toivonen switched to circuit racing. He drove in several racing classes with some successes. He participated in the 24 Hours of Le Mans in 1991 finishing ninth overall, driving a Porsche 962 for Kremer Racing with JJ Lehto and Manuel Reuter.

In 2002, Toivonen hung up his helmet as a full-time driver. In 2006, he opened an exhibition to pay tribute to his brother Henri at the Neste Oil Rally Finland.

Toivonen is now involved with Ian's Dawsons Le Mans Prototype Eco Racing Team.

== Racing record ==
=== Complete WRC results ===
| Year | Entrant | Car | 1 | 2 | 3 | 4 | 5 | 6 | 7 | 8 | 9 | 10 | 11 | 12 | 13 | WDC | Points |
|---|---|---|---|---|---|---|---|---|---|---|---|---|---|---|---|---|---|
| 1980 | Harri Toivonen | Chrysler Avenger | MON | SWE | POR | KEN | GRC | ARG | FIN; Ret | NZL | ITA | FRA | GBR | CIV | | NC | 0 |
| 1981 | Harri Toivonen | Talbot Sunbeam Lotus | MON | SWE | POR | KEN | FRA | GRC | ARG | BRA | FIN; Ret | ITA | CIV | GBR | | NC | 0 |
| 1982 | David Sutton Cars Ltd. | Ford Escort RS1800 | MON | SWE | POR | KEN | FRA | GRC | NZL | BRA | FIN; Ret | ITA | CIV | GBR | | NC | 0 |
| 1983 | Harri Toivonen | Mitsubishi Lancer Turbo | MON | SWE | POR | KEN | FRA | GRC | NZL | ARG | FIN; Ret | ITA | CIV | | | NC | 0 |
| 1983 | Mitsubishi Ralliart | Mitsubishi Lancer Turbo | | | | | | | | | | | | GBR; Ret | | NC | 0 |
| 1986 | Austin Rover WRT | MG Metro 6R4 | MON | SWE | POR | KEN | FRA | GRC | NZL | ARG | FIN; 8 | CIV | ITA | GBR; Ret | USA | 49th | 3 |
| 1987 | Harri Toivonen | Mazda 323 4WD | MON | SWE; Ret | POR | KEN | FRA | GRC | USA | NZL | ARG | FIN; Ret | CIV | ITA | GBR | NC | 0 |
| 1988 | Harri Toivonen | Lancia Delta Integrale | MON | SWE | POR | KEN | FRA | GRC | USA | NZL | ARG | FIN; Ret | CIV | ITA | GBR | NC | 0 |

=== 24 Hours of Le Mans results ===
| Year | Team | Co-Drivers | Car | Class | Laps | Pos. | Class Pos. |
|---|---|---|---|---|---|---|---|
| 1991 | (Germany) Porsche Kremer Racing | (Germany) Manuel Reuter (Finland) JJ Lehto | Porsche 962CK6 | C2 | 343 | 9th | 9th |
| 1992 | (United Kingdom) British Racing Motors | (South Africa) Wayne Taylor (United Kingdom) Richard Jones | BRM P351 | C1 | 20 | DNF | DNF |
| 1996 | (Germany) Kremer Racing | (France) Christophe Bouchut (Germany) Jürgen Lässig | Kremer K8 Spyder | LMP1 | 110 | DNF | DNF |
| 1997 | (United Kingdom) Pacific Racing Ltd. | (Chile) Eliseo Salazar (Spain) Jesús Pareja | BRM P301-Nissan | LMP | 6 | DNF | DNF |
| 2001 | (United Kingdom) Team Ascari | (South Africa) Werner Lupberger (United Kingdom) Ben Collins | Ascari A410-Judd | LMP900 | 134 | DNF | DNF |
