= Mazda 787B =

Prototype racing car manufactured by Mazda

Mazda 787 Mazda 787B
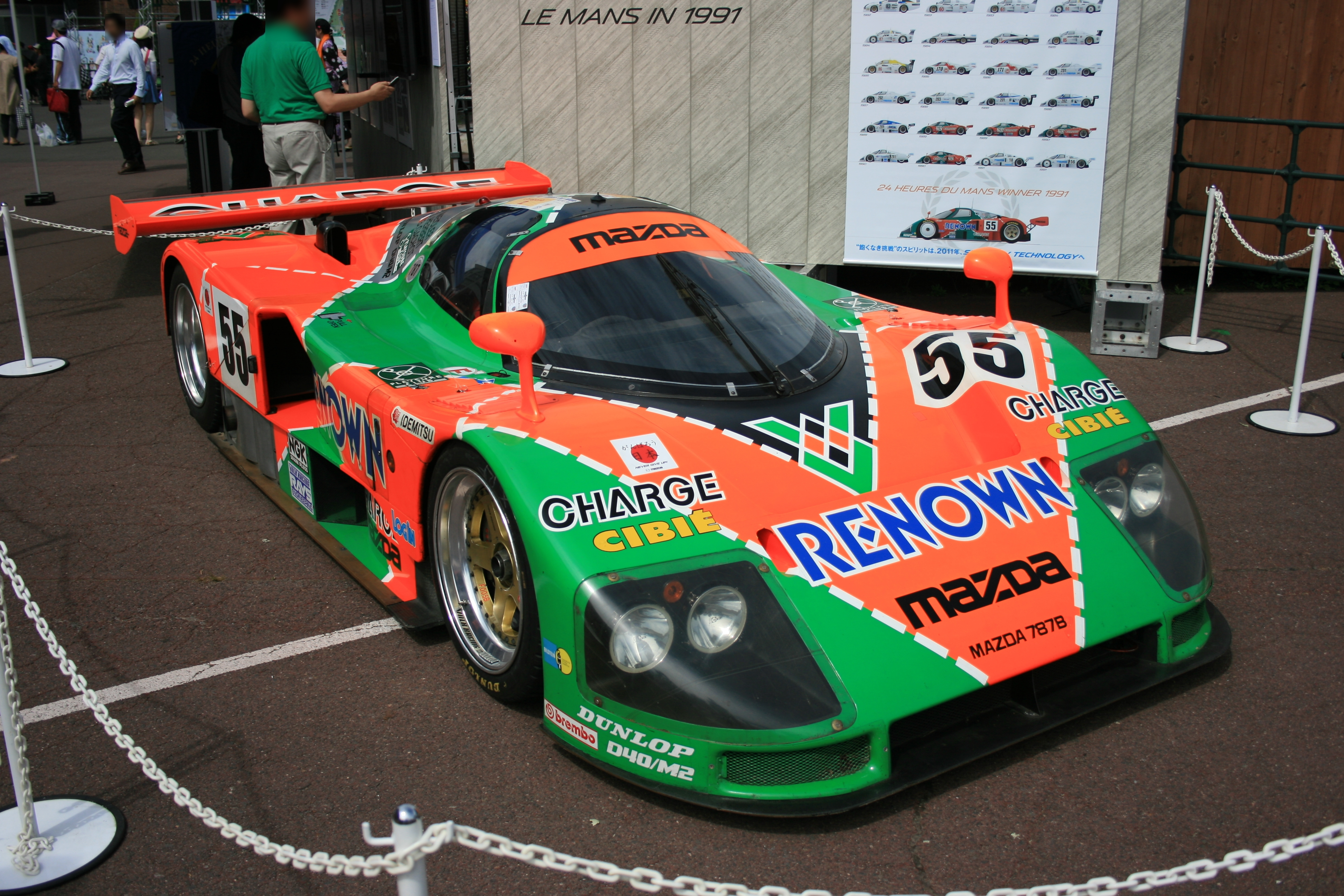
- A Mazda 787B in Odaiba in 2007
- Category: Group C/IMSA GTP
- Constructor: Mazda (Advanced Composite Technology)
- Designer: Nigel Stroud
- Predecessor: Mazda 767B
- Successor: Mazda MXR-01

Technical specifications
- Chassis: Kevlar and carbon composite monocoque
- Suspension (front): Double wishbone pullrod operated inboard Bilstein spring dampers.
- Suspension (rear): Double wishbone top rocker-operated inboard spring dampers.
- Axle track: 787: 1,450–1,530 mm (57–60 in); 787B: 1,504–1,534 mm (59–60 in)
- Wheelbase: 787: 2,640 mm (104 in); 787B: 2,662 mm (105 in)
- Engine: Mazda R26B 2,616 cc (159.6 cu in) 4-rotor naturally aspirated mid-engined, longitudinally mounted
- Transmission: Mazda/Porsche 5-speed manual
- Weight: 830 kg (1,830 lb)
- Fuel: Idemitsu
- Tyres: Dunlop 300-640x18/355-710x18 (275-620x17/330-700x17)

Competition history
- Notable entrants: (Japan) Mazdaspeed
- Notable drivers: (Belgium) Pierre Dieudonné; (Belgium) Bertrand Gachot; (United Kingdom) Johnny Herbert; (Sweden) Stefan Johansson; (Japan) Yoshimi Katayama; (Republic of Ireland) David Kennedy; (Japan) Tetsuya Ota; (Brazil) Maurizio Sandro Sala; (Japan) Yojiro Terada; (Germany) Volker Weidler; (Japan) Takashi Yorino
- Debut: 1990 1000 km of Fuji (787); 1991 430km of Suzuka (787B)
- First win: 1991 24 Hours of Le Mans
- Last win: 1991 24 Hours of Le Mans
- Last event: 1991 430 km of Autopolis
| Races | Wins | Poles | F/Laps |
|---|---|---|---|
| 21 | 1 | 0 | 0 |
- Constructors' Championships: 0
- Drivers' Championships: 0

The Mazda 787 and its derivative 787B are Group C sports prototype racing cars that were developed by Japanese automobile manufacturer Mazda for use in the World Sportscar Championship, All Japan Sports Prototype Championship, and the 24 Hours of Le Mans from 1990 to 1991. Designed to combine a mixture of the Fédération Internationale du Sport Automobile (FISA) Group C regulations with the International Motor Sports Association (IMSA) GTP regulations, the 787s were the last Wankel rotary-powered racing cars to compete in the World and Japanese championships, using Mazda's R26B engine.

Although the 787 and 787B lacked the single lap pace of World Championship competitors such as Mercedes-Benz, Jaguar, and Porsche, as well as Japanese Championship competitors Nissan and Toyota, the 787s had reliability that allowed them to contend for their respective championships. The reliability of the cars eventually paid off in 1991 when a 787B driven by Johnny Herbert, Volker Weidler, and Bertrand Gachot went on to victory in the 1991 24 Hours of Le Mans. As of 2026, this remains the only victory by a car not using a reciprocating engine design. It was the first victory by a Japanese manufacturer, and the only such victory until Toyota won the 2018 24 Hours of Le Mans.

A total of two 787s were built in 1990, while three newer specification 787Bs were built in 1991.

== Development ==
The initial design of the 787 was an evolution of the 767 and 767B designs that had been used by Mazda in 1988 and 1989. The 787 name was used instead of 777 to indicate a two-step improvement over the 767, and possibly over pronunciation difficulties of 777 in Japanese. Many mechanical elements of the 767 were carried over by Nigel Stroud when he designed the 787, but with some notable exceptions. Foremost was the replacement of the 767's 13J Wankel rotary engine. In its place, the brand new R26B was installed. The custom-built R26B featured a nearly identical layout and displacement, but included new design elements such as more granular variable intakes and three spark plugs per rotor instead of the 13J's two along with ceramic apex seals and variable length trumpets, among other modifications for increased efficiency. This allowed for a maximum power output of 900 hp (670 kW) at a redline of 10000 RPM, which was reportedly limited to 700 hp at 9000 RPM during the 1991 race at Le Mans for longevity. The five-speed gearbox manufactured by Porsche, also mounted on the 767 and 787 was retained.

Other modifications made to the 787's design included a relocation of the radiators. Initially placed beside the cockpit on the 767, a new single radiator was integrated into the nose of the 787. Air moved from the blunt nose of the car underneath the bodywork and through the radiator before exiting in front of the windshield. A Gurney flap was located at the radiator exit to increase front-end downforce. This new radiator location also meant a redesign of the doors of the car, where the old radiator design had been located. The intake in front of the door and exit behind were no longer necessary and were thus not included, giving the 787 a smoother bodywork design on top. To aid in rear engine and brake cooling, intakes were placed on the side bodywork, immediately above the exhaust cooling vents.

As before, Stroud's monocoque design was built from carbon and kevlar by Advanced Composite Technology in the United Kingdom. Carbon fiber body panels were affixed to the two initial chassis that were built in 1990.

=== 787B ===
Following the 1990 season, Mazda continued development of the 787 chassis in order to make improvements on its pace and reliability. One major development was the intake system for the rotary engine. In the past, Mazda had developed variable-length telescopic intake runners to optimize engine power and torque for varying RPM levels. For 1991, the system became continuously variable, rather than previous versions that had steps for different engine ranges. This resulted in an increased torque of 608 N⋅m (448 lb⋅ft) at 6,500 rpm. The 787B's onboard ECU controlled the action of the telescopic intake. Another main improvement was the change in suspension geometry which allowed for larger wheels to be fitted along with carbon ceramic brakes, a first for a Mazda racing car.

The engineers at Mazdaspeed determined that fuel efficiency was crucial for achieving victory so they restricted the redline of the engine to 8,500 rpm thus reducing the power output to 650 hp (485 kW). Emphasis was put on high cornering speeds rather than attaining high top speeds at the straight sections of the track. Jacky Ickx was appointed as an advisor to guide the team in preparing the car.

Three new 787Bs were built for 1991, while the two existing 787s were also upgraded with the new intakes. For Le Mans, two 787Bs were entered along with a 787 in the C2 class which were subject to greater restrictions than the newly introduced C1 class in which the cars were fitted with 3.5-litre Formula One-inspired naturally aspirated engines. The third car was built primarily to replace the Le Mans winning car in competition but it retired in 1992 with no notable success.

== Racing history ==
=== 1990 ===
The first 787 chassis made its competition debut in April 1990, at the second round of the All Japan Sports Prototype Championship (JSPC) season. For the Inter Challenge Fuji 1000 km, Mazdaspeed entered their 787 alongside an older 767B chassis, with Yoshimi Katayama, David Kennedy, and Pierre Dieudonné in the new car. After Fuji, the second 787 chassis was completed, and the team departed for Europe to prepare for Le Mans. Tests were performed at the Silverstone Circuit in Great Britain and Autódromo do Estoril in Portugal to prepare the car's setups and test its endurance. A total of 2,900 miles (4,700 km) were completed over the tests.

Former Le Mans-winner Jacky Ickx was hired by Mazdaspeed in order to prepare the two 787s, as well as an older 767B, for the race. Driver Stefan Johansson joined Kennedy and Dieudonné in the first car, and Bertrand Gachot, Volker Weidler and Johnny Herbert were hired for the second entry. The all-Japanese line-up of Katayama, Yojiro Terada and Takashi Yorino remained in the 767B. In qualifying the new 787s set the 22nd and 23rd fastest lap times, ahead of the 767B's 34th fastest time.

The two 787s ran reliably for much of the race, lasting through the night until problems were encountered in the early hours of Sunday morning. While leading their GTP class, an oil leak on the No. 201 entry for Kennedy, Dieudonné, and Johansson forced the team to retire the car. Two hours later, the No. 202 787 was also retired after an electrical failure and fire. Heat from the engine was blamed for both failures. The 767B, the only car remaining in its class, survived until the end of the race and finished 20th.

After Le Mans, Mazdaspeed withdrew the remaining 767B from competition. Two 787s were entered for the rest of the JSPC season with the Japanese trio of drivers in one entry and Kennedy and Dieudonné remaining in the other. Returning to Fuji, the 787s earned fifth and tenth-place finishes in a 500 km event, although the fifth-place finisher was later disqualified due to a fuel cell that was too large. Tenth place was again earned at the 1000 km of Suzuka, although the all-Japanese entry retired after an engine failure. A similar result occurred at Sugo, except it was the Japanese squad that finished eleventh while the international squad had an engine failure. For the last event of the season, the 1000 km of Fuji, Mazdaspeed entered the two 787s and a 767B, brought out of retirement. It finished sixth: one 787 was seventh and the other retired following a transmission failure. Mazdaspeed's Yoshimi Katayama earned 25th in the drivers' championship, and Mazda was fourth in the constructors' championship.

=== 1991 ===
For the 1991 season, Mazda expanded their efforts with the 787. Two cars were assigned to the JSPC series, while a third car ran the full Sportscar World Championship season for the first time, with drivers David Kennedy, Maurizio Sandro Sala, and Pierre Dieudonné assigned to the team. The French Oreca team were put in charge of the world championship campaign. Oreca and team consultant Jacky Ickx were able to persuade FISA that the 787s should be allowed to run with less weight than their competitors, leading to FISA allowing the team to run the cars at 830 kg (1,830 lb) rather than the standard 1,000 kg (2,205 lb) required for the C2 class.

Unlike the JSPC series, FISA had begun to integrate regulations for a new engine formula in the world championship, which required all teams to use 3,500 cc engines for 1991. Cars that met these regulations in 1991 became the top C1 class, while cars with other engines, including the 787, were reclassified as C2. The C2 class cars also retained the fuel consumption formula that group C had been founded on, while C1 cars no longer required it. This meant that Mazda now had to fight for class wins within their new class. In the JSPC, however, Mazda's 787s remained in the GTP class, as the sole competitors in the category.

The year started in Japan, with Mazdaspeed entering two older 787s while the new 787Bs were being finalised. Both cars suffered problems and were uncompetitive. Attention then turned to the Suzuka Circuit, where the début race of the world championship season was being run. The first new 787B chassis arrived alongside an older 787. The newer car, with Sandro Sala and Kennedy, out-qualified the older chassis driven by the all Japanese squad by only an eighth of a second, but the 787B was able to outlast several other competitors and finish in sixth overall, fourth in the C2 class, and earning Mazda points in the championship.

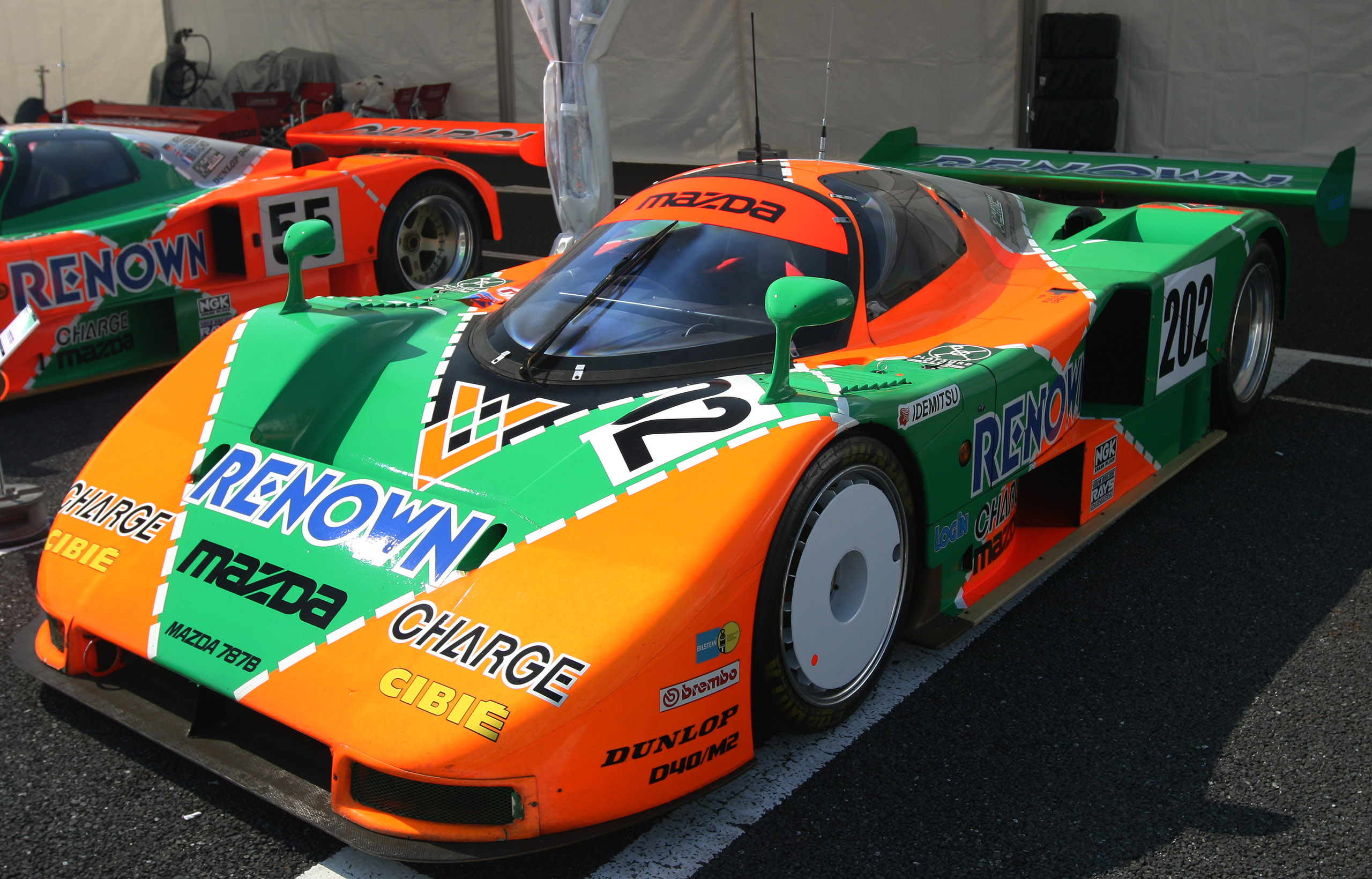
The 787B-003 (No. 202 in the JSPC) was built after the 1991 Le Mans. After a while, the chassis was remodelled for the short distance and the headlamps were removed to save weight

The 787B was retained in Japan while the European squad turned to Monza with an older 787. Yojiro Terada and Takashi Yorino earned the new 787B another sixth-place finish at the 1000 km of Fuji, while the European team finished seventh at Monza on the same day. A poor race at Silverstone added no points to Mazda's world championship total before the team concentrated on Le Mans.

Following the team's Le Mans victory, Mazdaspeed returned to Fuji once more with a 787B, and improved their season results with a fourth-place finish followed by another sixth at Suzuka. A third 787B was completed by October, and the two cars finished in third and fourth places at the second 1000 km of Fuji. To end the season, the team finished in sixth at Sportsland SUGO, earning Mazda fourth in the constructors' championship, and Takashi Yorino fourteenth in the drivers' championship.

The European squad meanwhile continued to use the older 787, finishing in fifth at the Nürburgring and seventh at Magny-Cours. The championship then flew to Mexico City where Mazda finished ninth, before the season ended back in Japan. The two 787Bs of the Japanese squad replaced the older 787, and the two cars finished in ninth and tenth places. Mazdaspeed finished fifth in the teams' championship, and Maurizio Sandro Sala earned fifteenth place in the drivers' championship.

==== 24 Hours of Le Mans ====
The 59th 24 Hours of Le Mans, round four of the World Sportscar Championship, was the first time the race took place at the entirely new pit complex much to the pleasure of pit crews and drivers, after several years of having to use the notoriously cramped area, which became associated with the film Le Mans.

Mazdaspeed entered three cars and a spare. One of them was a 787 from the previous year, numbered 56, driven by Dieudonné, Yorino and Terada and two brand new 787B's. One of them was driven by Maurizio Sandro Sala who replaced the newly retired Katayama, Johansson and Kennedy No. 18 (001) and the No. 55 (002) car of Weidler, Herbert and Gachot making its only appearance in its sole race.

Unlike the other two cars that were painted in their standard blue stripes on white livery, No. 55 had an outrageous bright orange and green scheme in honour of a main sponsor, Renown, a Japanese clothing manufacturer that had been supporting the team since 1988 by providing all their clothing for the events.

Mazda was not the favourite to win, but the three Mazdas started 19th (No. 55), 23rd (No. 18) and 30th (No. 56), despite being the 12th, 17th and 24th fastest qualifiers respectively. The new 3.5 litre cars were given the first grid positions, moving everyone else back by seven places. On the day before the race, team manager Ohashi decided to drop his usual conservative strategy and instructed the drivers of the No. 55 car to drive as if it were a short sprint race.

The decision was made based on the reliability of the cars demonstrated in the Paul Ricard tests, as well as the car's exceptional fuel economy, which meant that the carefully learned driving techniques intended to preserve the fuel allowance were no longer a critical part of the team's strategy. A number of teams were concerned about the reliability of the new 3.5L engine formula, with Jaguar and Sauber entering their older Group C vehicles; Jaguar entering their XJR12 alongside a sole XJR14 and Sauber not entering their C291 despite being developed for the 1991 season, instead entering the C11.

In the early stages of the race, the No. 55 car made its way to third place with the No. 18 car behind it two laps down. The No. 18 had a lower gear ratio setup meaning the car used less fuel but was 20 km/h (12 mph) slower. The No. 55 moved into second place when the Mercedes-Benz C11 of Michael Schumacher, Fritz Kreutzpointner and Karl Wendlinger spun off and later pitted with a gearbox problem. It soon became obvious that the leading car had slowed down to preserve its fuel allowance and an air of disbelief spread around the Mazda pit as it became obvious with six hours to run that there was a chance of victory.

At the 22nd hour, the No. 55 car took the lead after the C11 of Alain Ferté was forced to pit with mechanical problems. At the last pit-stop, Herbert asked to stay in the car, and went on to take the 787B across the finish line first, completing 362 laps and covering 4,932.2 km (both new records for the recently modified circuit). The two other cars finished sixth (No. 18) and eighth (No. 56). Three Jaguar XJR-12s and a sole Mercedes filled out positions two through five.

Herbert was so dehydrated that he had to be assisted out of the car and taken to the circuit's medical centre. As a result, he was unable to make it to the podium, leaving Weidler and Gachot to take up the celebrations. He later commented in a magazine interview that some "dodgy" spaghetti he ate before his shift was the cause.

The winning car ran without a hitch apart from a blown headlamp bulb and a precautionary rear wheel bearing change on the driver's side of the car, when a regular check during a pit-stop showed it to be overheating slightly. The victory was a major success for Mazda after several years of poor results.

== Complete World Sportscar Championship results ==
(Results in bold indicate pole position, and results in italics indicate fastest lap. Results with a ^{B} indicate the 787B while others utilized the older 787.)

| Year | Entrant | Engine | Class | Drivers | No. | 1 | 2 | 3 | 4 | 5 | 6 | 7 | 8 | Points | Position |
|---|---|---|---|---|---|---|---|---|---|---|---|---|---|---|---|
| 1991 | Mazdaspeed | Mazda R26B 2.6 L 4-rotor | C2 | | | SUZ | MNZ | SIL | LMS | NÜR | MAG | MEX | AUT | 47 | 5th |
| 1991 | Mazdaspeed | Mazda R26B 2.6 L 4-rotor | C2 | (Brazil) Maurizio Sandro Sala | 18 | 6^{B} | 7 | 11 | 6^{B} | 5 | 7 | | 9^{B} | 47 | 5th |
| 1991 | Mazdaspeed | Mazda R26B 2.6 L 4-rotor | C2 | (Republic of Ireland) David Kennedy | 18 | 6^{B} | | 11 | 6^{B} | 5 | | | | 47 | 5th |
| 1991 | Mazdaspeed | Mazda R26B 2.6 L 4-rotor | C2 | (Belgium) Pierre Dieudonné | 18 | | 7 | | | | 7 | 9 | | 47 | 5th |
| 1991 | Mazdaspeed | Mazda R26B 2.6 L 4-rotor | C2 | (Sweden) Stefan Johansson | 18 | | | | 6^{B} | | | | | 47 | 5th |
| 1991 | Mazdaspeed | Mazda R26B 2.6 L 4-rotor | C2 | (Japan) Yojiro Terada | 18 | | | | | | | 9 | 9^{B} | 47 | 5th |
| 1991 | Mazdaspeed | Mazda R26B 2.6 L 4-rotor | C2 | (Belgium) Bertrand Gachot | 55 | | | | 1^{B} | | | | | 47 | 5th |
| 1991 | Mazdaspeed | Mazda R26B 2.6 L 4-rotor | C2 | (Germany) Volker Weidler | 55 | | | | 1^{B} | | | | | 47 | 5th |
| 1991 | Mazdaspeed | Mazda R26B 2.6 L 4-rotor | C2 | (United Kingdom) Johnny Herbert | 55 | | | | 1^{B} | | | | | 47 | 5th |
| 1991 | Mazdaspeed | Mazda R26B 2.6 L 4-rotor | C2 | (Japan) Yojiro Terada | 56 | | | | 8 | | | | | 47 | 5th |
| 1991 | Mazdaspeed | Mazda R26B 2.6 L 4-rotor | C2 | (Japan) Takashi Yorino | 56 | | | | 8 | | | | | 47 | 5th |
| 1991 | Mazdaspeed | Mazda R26B 2.6 L 4-rotor | C2 | (Belgium) Pierre Dieudonné | 56 | | | | 8 | | | | | 47 | 5th |
| 1991 | Mazdaspeed | Mazda R26B 2.6 L 4-rotor | C2 | (Japan) Takashi Yorino | 58 | NC | | | | | | | 10^{B} | 47 | 5th |
| 1991 | Mazdaspeed | Mazda R26B 2.6 L 4-rotor | C2 | (Japan) Yojiro Terada | 58 | NC | | | | | | | | 47 | 5th |
| 1991 | Mazdaspeed | Mazda R26B 2.6 L 4-rotor | C2 | (Republic of Ireland) David Kennedy | 58 | | | | | | | | 10^{B} | 47 | 5th |

== After Le Mans ==
=== 787B ===
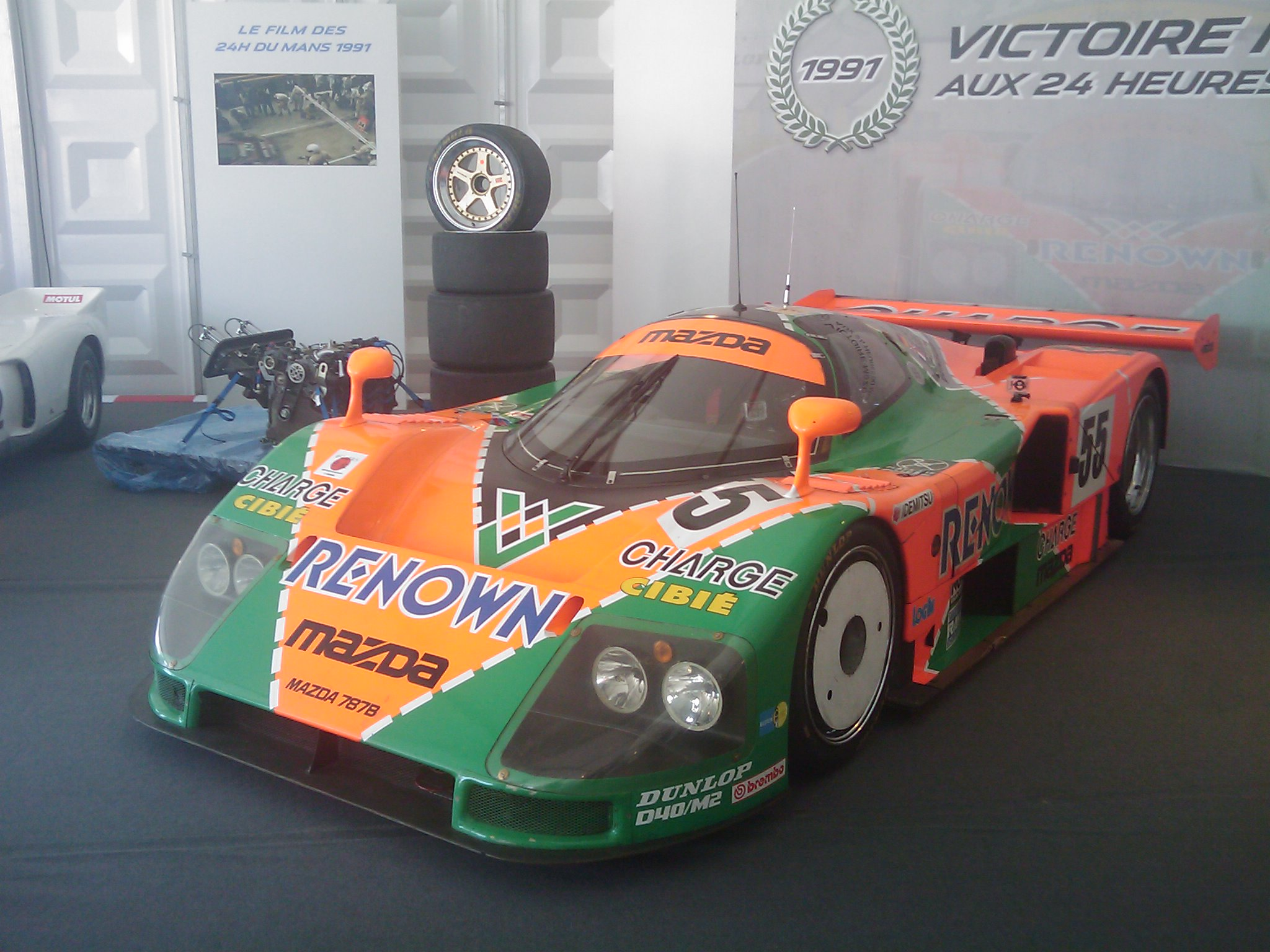
Mazda 787B on display at Le Mans 2011 24-hour race

After Le Mans, the winning car (787B-002) was retired from duty while the other two cars (787B-001 and new 787B-003) continued to race. Mazda would go on to finish fourth and fifth in the Japanese and world championship respectively, with a season high (besides Le Mans) third in the 1000 km Fuji race (a JSPC race). As Mazda used different drivers throughout the season, none of their drivers finished in the top 10 in points.

After the 1991 24 Hours of Le Mans, the 787B would compete once more in the world championship, at the last race of the season, the 1991 430 km of Autopolis (finishing 9th and 10th). At the end of the season, the Group C series was replaced by the 3.5-litre World Sports Championship and therefore Wankel-type rotary engines would no longer be allowed to run as they were outlawed and, as per Fédération Internationale de l'Automobile's earlier decision, 3.5-litre engines similar to those used in Formula One became the new formula for the 1992 season. The following year, Mazda entered the MXR-01, based on the Jaguar XJR-14 and powered by a Judd unit, without much success (placed fourth at Le Mans in 1992).

Despite the Le Mans success of the 787B and its Wankel powerplant, Mazda did not exploit its historic victory through marketing campaigns and advertising. It partially improved sales for Mazda's road cars, however. In the United Kingdom, Mazda would introduce a special edition of its MX-5 with the racing colour and also a BBR (Brodie Brittain Racing) turbo conversion; only 24 were produced and the car is one of the most sought after special edition cars of its model. Long a proponent of the rotary engine, Mazda maintained a rotary-engine road car for many years, though sales of the RX-7 were stopped in North America after the 1995 model year (with Japanese-market production ending in 2002) until the introduction of the 2003 RX-8. The RX-8 utilized a new generation of the Mazda Wankel engine, dubbed "Renesis", which uses side intake and exhaust ports.

787B was displayed at the Otaru City Museum for 20 years, but the car has been returned to Mazda Headquarters as of November 18, 2015.

=== Drivers ===
Of the winning drivers, Herbert would have a successful career in Formula One, notching three wins before leaving the championship in 2000 and returning to sportscar racing. Gachot went on to drive for Jordan Grand Prix in 1991 before being given an eighteen-month prison sentence in August 1991 for a CS gas attack on a taxi driver in London; his place for the Belgian Grand Prix was famously filled by then-newcomer Michael Schumacher. He was released after two months and achieved minor successes before retiring altogether. Weidler would compete in the Japanese Formula 3000 championship, only to have his career cut short when he was diagnosed with tinnitus. It was recommended he should take time off to allow for an operation but he chose to retire from the sport and handed his seat over to Heinz-Harald Frentzen. Of the non-winning drivers, Dieudonné later retired from driving and become sporting director at Oreca, this time backed by Chrysler to help the Dodge Viper to score class wins at Le Mans by the late nineties and an overall win at the 24 Hours of Daytona in 2000. Terada, a veteran of the race since 1974, continued to run his Autoexe tuning business. He still competed at Le Mans, although without factory backing but showing no signs of retiring. The former F1 driver, Johansson, returned to IndyCar duties, frequently competing in the race before returning full-time.

=== Engine ===
The R26B engine was used by Mazda in its RX-792P for its premier IMSA GTP category with limited success. The engine continued to be used in the GTS category for the spaceframe FD3S RX-7, which returned to Le Mans in 1994, backed by Mazdaspeed. The livery returned again, in 1995, in Jim Downing's rotary-powered Kudzu DG-1, which competed in IMSA's WSC (World Sport Car), a category with different regulations than the FIA. This time, they started the race without the Renown sponsorship and in 1996 in the lower end LMP2 category, which was the last time Mazda used the livery. Mazdaspeed would continue to compete in the race until 1999.

In 2002 Autoexe Motorsport with Yojiro Terada as one of its drivers participated in 24 Hours of Le Mans using a R26B 2.6L four-rotor engine in a modified WR chassis. They did not finish the race, however. In 2005 B-K Motorsports competed a Courage C65 LMP2 prototype in the American Le Mans Series, powered by a Mazda tri-rotor Wankel and painted in a yellow and blue version of the livery worn by the 787B.

=== 787B's legacy ===
Today the car is considered by Mazda and Wankel enthusiasts as one of the most iconic race cars to come out of Japan. It has appeared in several video games, such as the Gran Turismo series, the Forza Motorsport series, and Assetto Corsa. In 2005, a factory-backed RX-8 used the Renown colours to compete in a 24-hour race at Silverstone.

Mazda keeps the winning car at the Mazda Museum in Hiroshima. At the same time, Mazda produced two replicas and gave one of them to the Le Mans Museum. The Le Mans Museum car, chassis 04, is an authentic car with non-operational mechanics. The race winning car usually makes appearances at the annual Sevenstock shows, and has made three appearances at the Monterey Historics event in 1999, 2004, and 2026, and still bears a pair of small oval racing stickers behind the side windows, referring to its appearance at the 1999 Goodwood Festival of Speed, when it was reunited with and driven by Gachot.

The 2008 Mazda Furai Concept bears the 55 number of the winning 787B.

After a lengthy restoration, the winning No. 55 787B was demonstrated during the pre-race of the 2011 24 Hours of Le Mans. Winning driver Johnny Herbert took the 787B around the Circuit de La Sarthe for a demonstration lap.

On December 24, 2014, as part of the Vision Gran Turismo project, Mazda unveiled the LM55 Vision Gran Turismo concept car, available as downloadable content in Gran Turismo 6. The LM55 is seen as an homage to Mazda's own 1991 victory at the 24 Hours of Le Mans. At the 2015 Goodwood Festival of Speed, the LM55 and 787B were the focus of that year's monument.

On July 2, 2016, at the annual Sahlen's Six Hours of the Glen, held at Watkins Glen International as leg in the Tequila Patron North American Endurance Cup, Mazda's Prototype team used the 787B livery on their two prototypes in commemoration for the 25th anniversary of Mazda's Le Mans win.

On July 30, 2018, the 787B No. 55 was added to the game Gran Turismo Sport, keeping the 787B's long streak as part of the Gran Turismo series alive. The car's engine sound was slightly updated, along with its interior and its drivers' names, which were corrected.

== Specifications ==
The 1990 787's specifications are in parentheses.

=== Chassis/body ===
- Body construction: Kevlar/carbonfibre composite
- Wheels: 18 in x 12 in front/18 in x 14.75 in rear Volk Racing magnesium alloy (17 in x 12 in front/17 in x 14.75 in rear)
- Brakes: Carbon Industries outboard ventilated 14-inch (360 mm) carbon discs and calipers (Brembo steel)
- Lighting: 2 Cibie headlights on each side
- Weight: c. 850 kg

=== Engine ===
- Type: R26B, Mazda Wankel engine
- Intake porting: Peripheral porting
- Induction system: Four separate telescopic intake manifolds
- Ignition system: Electronic ignition system with three spark plugs per rotor
- Fuel system: Nippon Denso electronic manifold injection
- Lubrication system: Dry sump
- Cooling system: Water cooling
- Instrumentation and telemetry system by Pi Research
- Rotors (i): 4, inline
- Eccentricity (e) × radius (R) × width (B): 15 mm × 105 mm × 80 mm
- Chamber volume (V_{k}): 655 cm^{3} (40 in^{3})
- Displacement (V_{h}): 5240 cm^{3} (320 in^{3})
- Maximum power (P_{e}): 515 kW (700 PS; 691 hp) at 9,000 rpm
- Maximum torque (M_{e}): 608 N⋅m (62.0 kp⋅m; 448 lbf⋅ft) at 6,500 rpm
- BMEP (p_{me}): 1.46 MPa (14.6 bar; 212 lbf/in^{2})
- BSFC (b_{e}): 286 g/(kW·h) at 6000/min (210 g/(PS·h); .47 lb/(hp·h))
- Compression (ε): 10
- Mass (m): 180 kg (397 lb)
