= 1991 24 Hours of Le Mans =

59th 24 Hours of Le Mans endurance race

Previous: 1990	Next: 1992
Index: Races | Winners

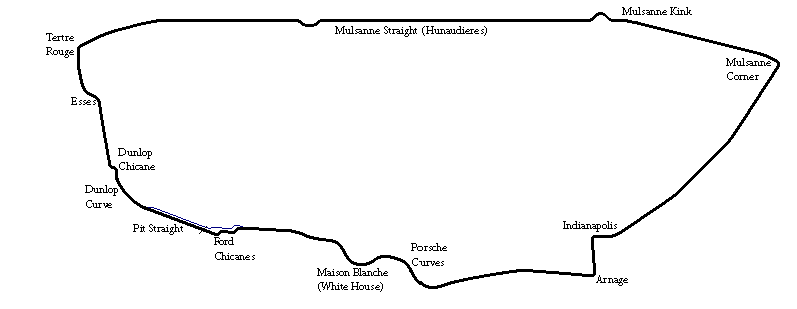
Le Mans in 1991

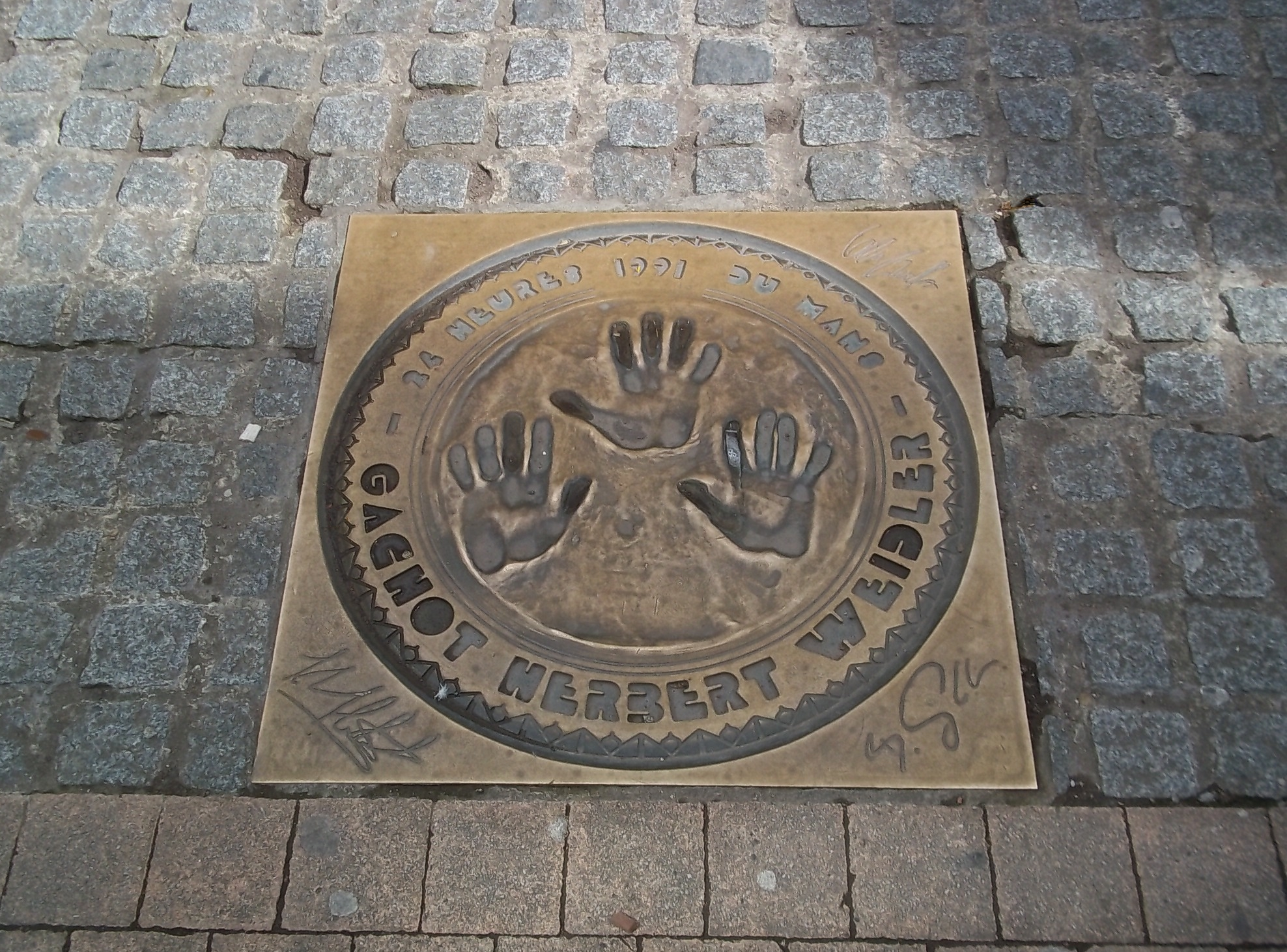
Tile on the Le Mans Walk of Fame for the 1991 winners

The 1991 24 Hours of Le Mans was the 59th Grand Prix of Endurance, taking place at the Circuit de la Sarthe, France, on the 22 and 23 June 1991. It was also the fourth round of the 1991 FIA Sportscar World Championship season.

This was the inaugural season of the new 3.5-litre non-turbo regulations for Sports Cars, however the number of teams entering cars in that class was very limited, so the entry list was opened up to the old Group C category. To promote their new formula, FISA decreed that the top ten grid spots had to be taken by cars in the new class, regardless of their qualifying time, with the Group C cars arranged behind them. The piston-engine Group C cars were penalised to carry 100 kg extra ballast, but the rotary-engine Mazdas were not.

The race was anticipated to be a final showdown between Jaguar and Sauber-Mercedes, with Porsche, Mazda and the new Peugeots playing supporting roles. Indeed, from the front of the grid, the Peugeots did lead for the first hour, but their reliability failed them, and they were soon in the pits to eventually retire. It was then that the Mercedes cars that took up the lead, even running positions 1-2-3 for several hours. The Jaguars were being stymied by fuel consumption and had to temper their pace accordingly. Nevertheless, the three cars stayed in the top-10, fighting with the two new Mazda 787Bs.

By the halfway point, the Schlesser/Mass/Ferté Mercedes were up by a lap over their teammates, the Junior team of Wendlinger/Schumacher/Kreutzpointner, and by three laps over their nearest opponents, the Mazda of Weidler/Herbert/Gachot. Within an hour though, Wendlinger brought his car into the pits stuck in fourth gear. The Mazda was lapping faster than the Mercedes but was unable to make a serious dent in the margin. As the new day dawned, the Jaguars were successively delayed by off-road excursions and engine problems. The leading Joest Porsche had been running as high as fourth but came to a stop out on the track.

After leading for almost 17 hours, the leading Mercedes came into the pits with its temperature skyrocketing. The belt on the waterpump had come off and stopped the engine cooling – a similar issue to what had struck the third team-car a few hours earlier. The damage was terminal, and the Mazda screamed past into the lead with three hours to go. Their run had been very reliable, and although the Jaguars tried to push, Herbert brought home the Mazda to win by two laps over the IMSA-team Jaguar of Jones/Boesel/Ferté. The Mercedes-Junior team lost a place in the last hour but survived to finish fifth and win the Index of Energy Efficiency. Michael Schumacher also set a new lap record, beating the previous one by five seconds. Only 12 cars were classified at the finish, including just a single entry from the new Category 1.

== Regulations ==
In the close-season, FISA (Fédération Internationale du Sport Automobile) and the ACO (Automobile Club de l'Ouest) had finally reached an agreement. The ACO accepted their demands over media, commercial and timekeeping rights. In return, FISA offered a five-year contract in the new Sportscar World Championship (SWC), with worldwide TV promotion and coverage.

The new sports car regulations dictated non-turbocharged piston engines of 3.5-litres, as were being used in Formula 1 currently. The cars had a minimum weight of 750 kg. Few manufacturers had prepared new models meeting the regulations, so FISA had to let the Group C cars (to be called "Category 2") back in the entry lists and declared 1991 as another "transitional season" to allow more time. They would have the same fuel limit as before (2550 litres), but now had their minimum weight lifted by 100 kg to 1000 kg. However, no such weight limit was applied to the GTP rotaries. They committed 50 entries to the ACO for the race, but by March there were only 17 for the Championship. FISA reduced their commitment to 40 Championship cars and Le Mans and two non-European rounds were given a waiver to allow non-registered teams to enter. Having not been consulted as required, Jaguar and Mercedes in particular, were livid that Nissan and Toyota (who had abstained from the Championship) would now be able to race after all for the one-off event without the expense of the rest of the series. A compromise was reached at an emergency meeting between FISA and the Championship team managers. Non-registered cars would only be allowed to race at Le Mans if entered by an SWC team and running the same engine as that team. Those teams already in the SWC still had to enter at least one of their Category 1 cars. In light of this, the ACO extended the deadline into May, and the entry list swelled accordingly.

In September 1990, the ACO had started demolition and rebuild of the pits complex that had originally been constructed following the 1955 disaster. The lavish new facility, costing more than £12 million, was state-of-the-art and one of the best-equipped in the world. It now housed the race-control centre, media centre, corporate hospitality suites as well as a 2900-seat grandstand. At a practical level, there was accommodation for 46 pit spaces, each 15 x5 metres and five times the size of the previous pit-space. The pit-lane was 15m wide with a further 3m zone next to the pit-wall for the teams. The pit straight was also widened to 12 metres. It was inaugurated on the Friday night with celebration and fireworks. Out on the track, the Indianapolis and Arnage corners were modified to provide greater run-off areas. The chicanes that were installed on the Hunaudières straight the previous year were resurfaced, smoothing out the bumps that had been so problematic. Finally, the signalling pits at the Mulsanne hairpin were demolished. Another structure dating from the 1956 renovation, they were now deemed redundant with the universal use of car-radios by the teams.

This year saw the advent of the Empreintes des Vainquers in Le Mans city. The project was the idea of Bernard Warain, akin to the Hollywood walk of fame, around the Place Saint-Nicholas. It started a tradition that, at the start of each racing week, the previous year's winners would leave their hand and footprints embedded in a plaque on the pavement for posterity.

Coach tours for the British fans to get to and from the race ranged from £60 to 70. Prices for the race included a £28 entry ticket, with £10 for a shuttle-bus around the circuit. Grandstand tickets included £25 for the new Pit Stand up to £38 for the Dunlop stand, with camping costs around the track going for around £13-20.

The ACO changed their mind from the previous year, dropping the extra half-hour of qualifying in the first sessions of both days, thus returning to 4hours total on Wednesday and Thursday. To further ensure the promotion of their new Sports Car regulations, FISA had decreed that the top-10 grid spots had to go to Category 1 cars in the SWC races, irrespective of their qualifying time, with the Group C cars arranged behind them.

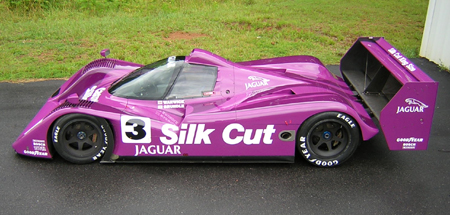
Jaguar XJR-14

== Entries ==
The FISA entry-list debacle and the subsequent arrangements played havoc with the ACO and their race-organisation.

The accommodation with the WSC manufacturers did indeed stymie Nissan and Toyota's plan to compete, as neither were in the series and no-one else ran their engines. After the decision was released, deals were quickly made with the championship teams to enter supplemental cars on behalf of other teams, and in the end a reasonable total of 46 cars was received, matching the number of berths in the new pit complex.

This year, the Spice-Fords were joined by Peugeot, Jaguar and Mercedes-Benz in the 3.5-litre formula. Built primarily for the sprint-race formats, it was questionable what their endurance capabilities were. Jaguar and Mercedes-Benz had the luxury of also being able to call upon their older, Category 2 (Group C) cars. Porsche engines dominated that class, with 19 cars from Porsche and Cougar. Mazda was the sole Japanese representative, now also put into Category 2, and running the full Championship.

Jaguar had beaten Porsche in 1988, Sauber-Mercedes had defeated Jaguar and Porsche with a 1-2 finish in 1989. Then, with Mercedes boycotting the 1990 race, Jaguar had their own 1–2 victory. So the 1991 race was keenly anticipated as the final showdown between the dominant marques of Group C, Jaguar and Mercedes-Benz.

In the end, the starting grid of 38 cars was the smallest in almost 60 years.

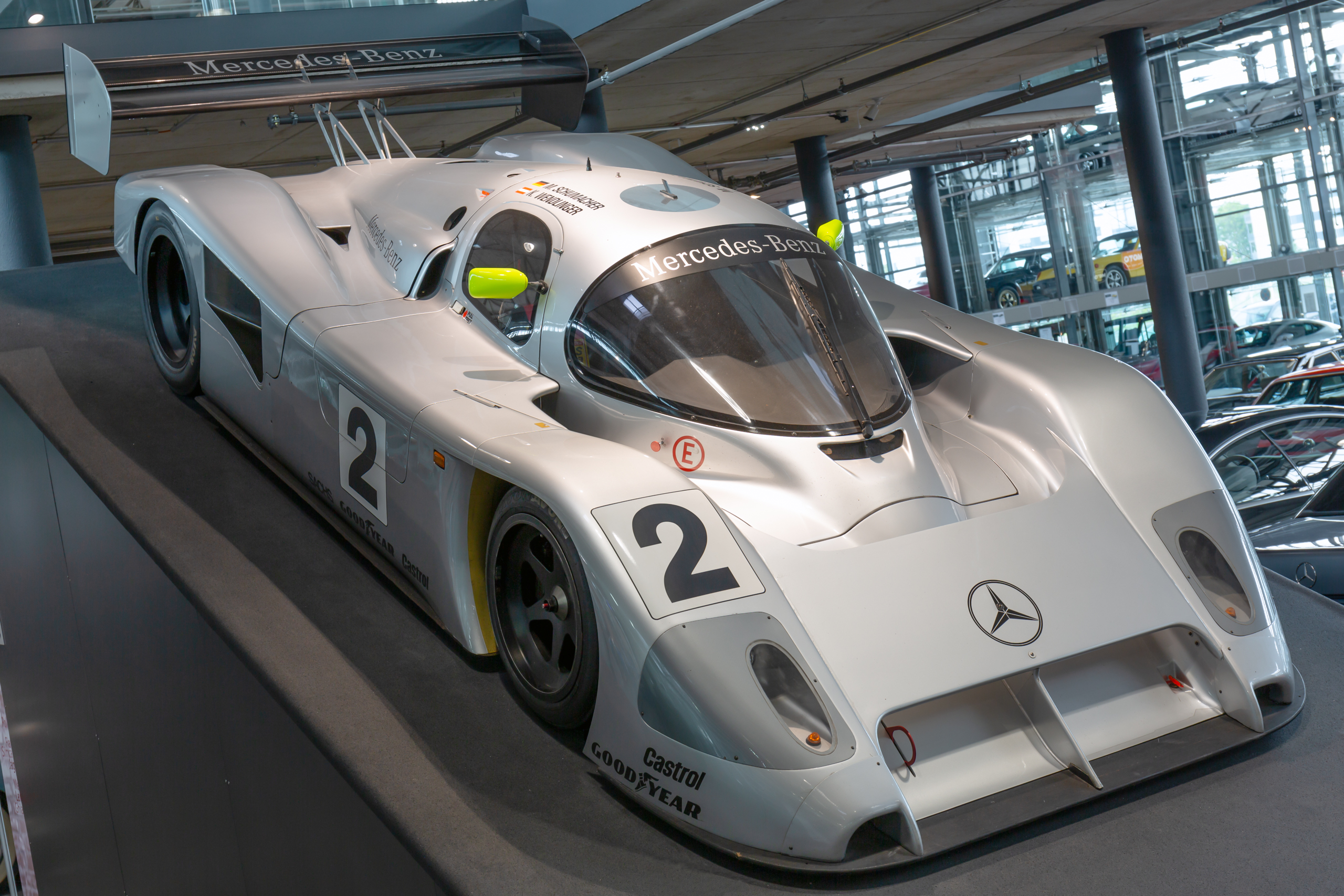
Mercedes-Benz C291

Class	Quantity	Turbo+rotary engines
Category 1	14 / 10	0 / 0
Category 2	32 / 28	27 / 23
Total Entries	46 / 38	27 / 23

- Note: The first number is the number accepted, the second the number who started.

=== Category 1 ===
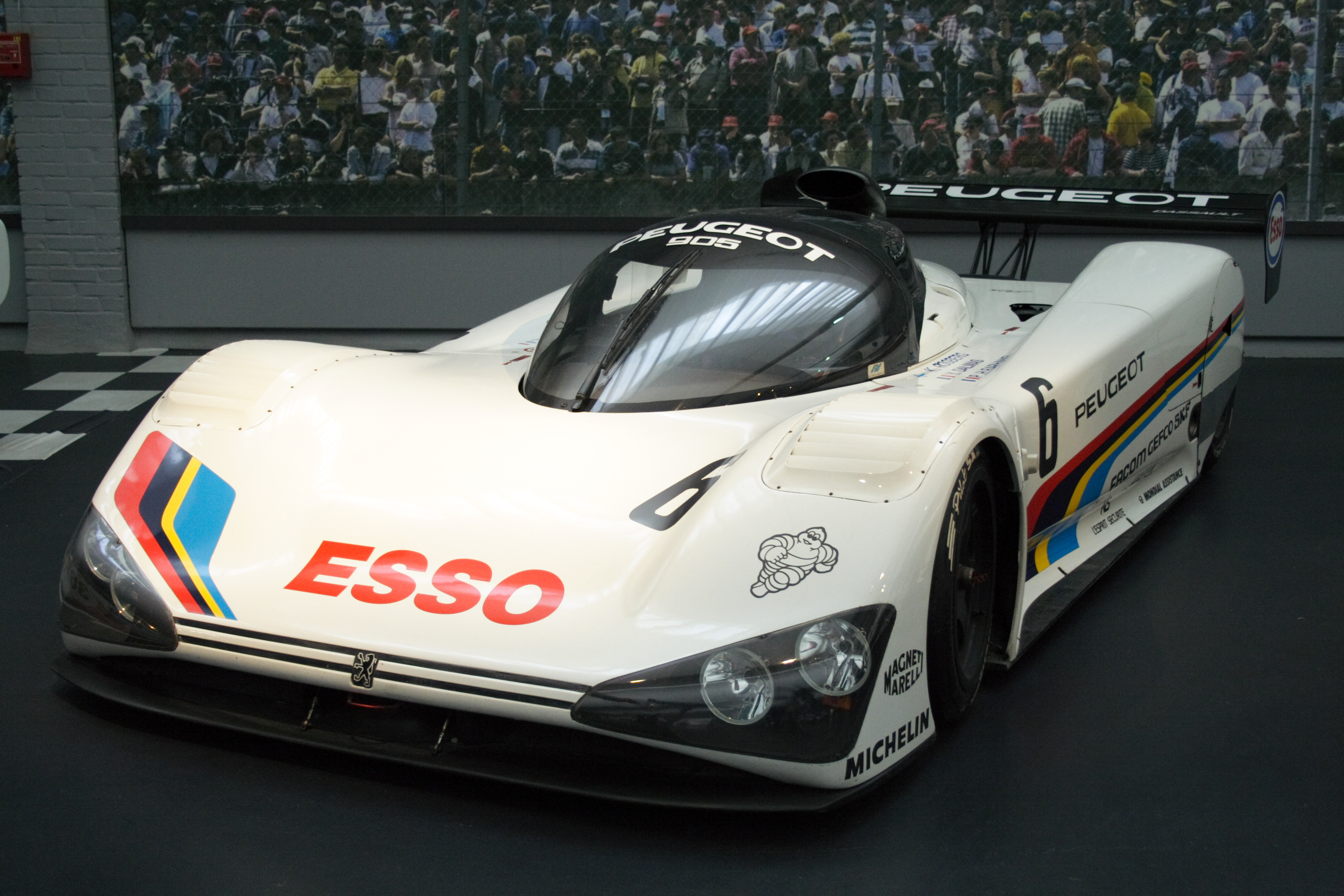
Peugeot 905

Defending champions, Jaguar had prepared a new model for the SWC. The XJR-14 was designed by Ross Brawn; it was fitted with the Jaguar-badged version of the Ford-Cosworth HB Formula 1 engine that could develop 650 bhp at over 11000rpm. It featured a two-tier rear wing and a bubble canopy, that effectively doubled as a door. Per the FISA regulations, SWC teams had to enter at least one of the 3.5-litre cars at Le Mans. Two cars were entered, though only one arrived, to be driven by Teo Fabi, Andy Wallace and Kenny Acheson. TWR also brought four XJR-12s in Category 2. The cars were all decked out in a lustrous new purple paintjob.

After missing the previous year's race, Sauber and Mercedes-Benz returned to Le Mans. Having won the World Championship for the past two years, they entered this year's Championship with the new Mercedes-Benz C291, with its purpose-built 3.5-litre Mercedes M291 flat-12 engine. It was also one of the first sports car to feature a sequential gearbox. A single car was entered and the Mercedes Junior Team of Karl Wendlinger, Michael Schumacher and Fritz Kreutzpointner were assigned to the car. As with Jaguar, this thereby allowed them to enter their Group C championship-winning C11 cars as well.

The third factory team to build a car for the 3.5-litre formula was Peugeot. Following a successful time in rallying, they aspired to emulate their compatriot company Renault and to win in endurance racing. The company had supported the WM team in their quest to break 400 kp/h at Le Mans. The Peugeot works team had raced at Le Mans previously, in 1926, when they were the dominant team in motorsport. The new Peugeot 905 had been designed and built at the Peugeot Talbot Sport factory near Paris led by André de Cortanze, who had designed the Renault winners. The monocoque chassis and shell was made of advanced composite and tested at the Dassault aircraft wind-tunnel. Jean-Pierre Boudy headed the engine team, having already worked with the Renault team. The V10 was angled at 80 degrees with four valves per cylinder, generating 600 bhp with a Magneti-Marelli engine-management system. An innovative transaxle ran the first and second gears through the front wheels, while the third to sixth went to the rear. The car was unveiled in the middle of 1990 and ran in the final two races of the season. Two cars ran this season, managed by team director Jean Todt. Mauro Baldi and Philippe Alliot caused a sensation by winning the opening round at Suzuka and Baldi was the reigning World Drivers Champion (with Sauber-Mercedes) alongside Jean-Louis Schlesser. The second car was run by former F1 world champion Keke Rosberg with Yannick Dalmas, matching up experience with young French F1 prospects. The team were joined by French drivers Jean-Pierre Jabouille and Pierre-Henri Raphanel.

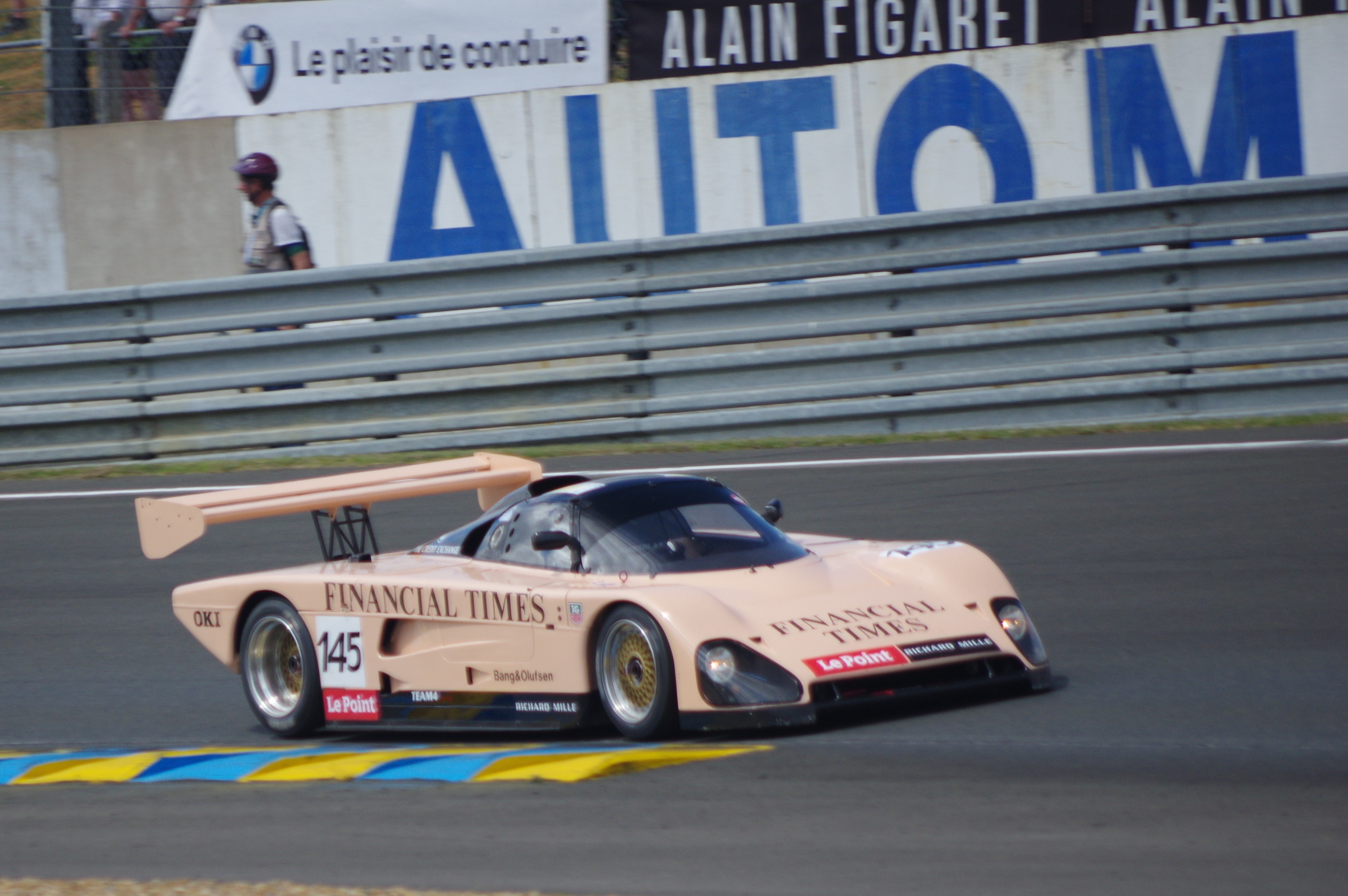
Chamberlain Spice SE89C

Spice Engineering had been forced into bankruptcy in at the beginning of the year, and in March was acquired by the Japanese corporation Fedco, which subsequently relaunched the company as Spice Prototype Automobiles to continue production. Dutchman Charles Zwolsman was their main customer for his Euro Racing team and bought two of the new chassis that were the only regular Spice entries in the championship. One was entered for Le Mans (with the other as a Test-car), fitted with a Cosworth DFZ engine tuned to 550 bhp by John Nicholson. Fedco kept one of their new chassis for racing in Japan and brought it to Le Mans, their rookie drivers helped by the expertise of former SARD-Toyota driver Naoki Nagasaka. Along with the Fedco car, five other Spices came to Le Mans under the umbrella of Euro Racing. Last year's winners, PC Automotive, returned with their SE89C, having upgraded its DFL with a 3.5-litre DFZ engine. Hugh Chamberlain entered both of his SE89Cs, including the 1989 Championship-winning car. Classic Racing was the only US-entry this year, with a 3-year old SE88 owned by GP Motorsport, and now fitted with a 3.2-litre Ferrari V8 turbo, that therefore consigned them to the Category 2 with the other turbo-cars. Tsunemasa Aoshima had started his new team AO Racing in 1990, for the Japanese Championship, running an accomplished all-female crew of South African Desiré Wilson and American Lyn St. James in an all-pink SE90. For this race they were joined by French Indy-Lights driver Cathy Muller.

Ever the optimists, the small French team of Louis Descartes embarked on another run in the world championship. They built a second carbon-fibre monocoque chassis, the C91. With a Cosworth DFR purchased off Ligier, it had updated suspension and carbon brakes. That engine provided a connection for a further two Spice entries to coat-tail into the race: Graff Racing had their SE89C, while the new Berkely team had obtained an ex-works SE90C. However, when the drivers could not provide current racing licences, the scrutineers refused their entry.

Fred Stalder's Racing Organisation Course team had been racing at Le Mans in the 1970s with Chevrons powered by his own ROC 2-litre engines. Of late, he had been running Audis in the French Supertourisme series. In conjunction with Swiss constructor Chuck Graemiger, they built a new car following on from his Cheetah Group C cars. An international effort, the composites tub was made by Anglia Composites in England and the body was a carbonfibre/kevlar design of Frenchman Robert Choulet. The engine was a Cosworth DFR, tuned by Swiss engine-specialist Heini Mader. Initial tests were unsatisfactory, so Stalder's team did a lot of rework on the body and suspension. Entered by Descartes, the ROC 002 arrived with limited follow-up testing and was almost 100 kg overweight, the heaviest in Category 1.

=== Category 2 ===
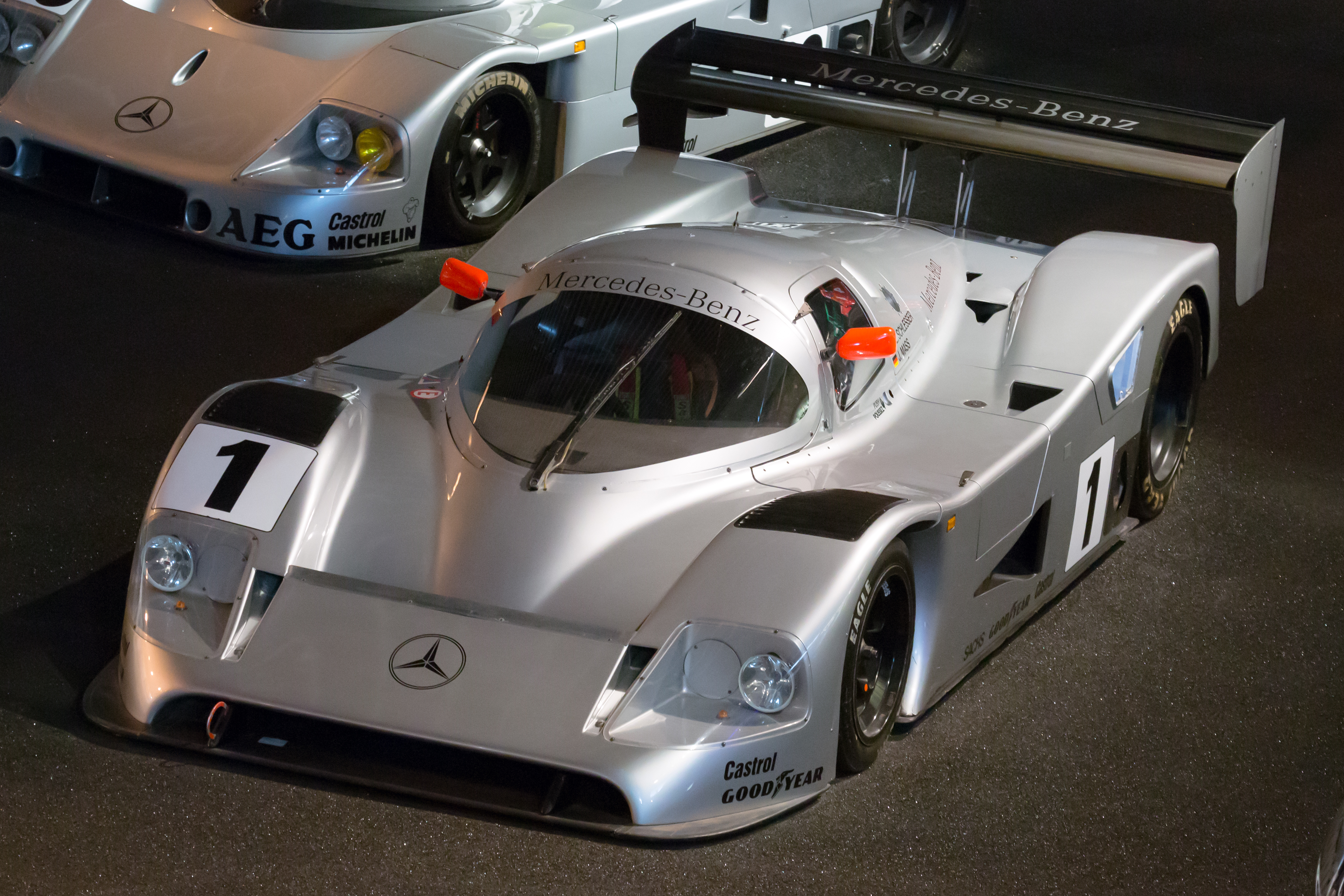
Mercedes-Benz C11

TWR had little faith that the XJR-14 sprint-car would have the endurance to last at Le Mans and thus prepared a full assault with the Group C cars that had won the previous year. The Jaguar XJR-12 had been given aerodynamic changes by engineer Alastair McQueen and bigger brakes fitted. Given that they had won in 1990 with fuel left over, TWR's engine-specialist, Allan Scott enhanced the 24-valve V12, boring it out to 7.4-litres and increasing the torque. Two new chassis were built with one of last year's car upgraded. A fourth car (the rebuilt car that had crashed at Daytona) was entered for Suntec, the TWR team running in the Japanese Championship. A big squad of over 100 TWR personnel arrived for the race. The driving combinations were based around the core drivers in the respective championships: with SWC team leader Derek Warwick with John Nielsen/Andy Wallace, fellow regular Teo Fabi joined by Wollek and Acheson, while the IMSA-team drivers Davy Jones and Raul Boesel raced with Michel Ferté. The fourth, Japanese, entry was crewed by the Suntec-team drivers Mauro Martini/Jeff Krosnoff with David Leslie.

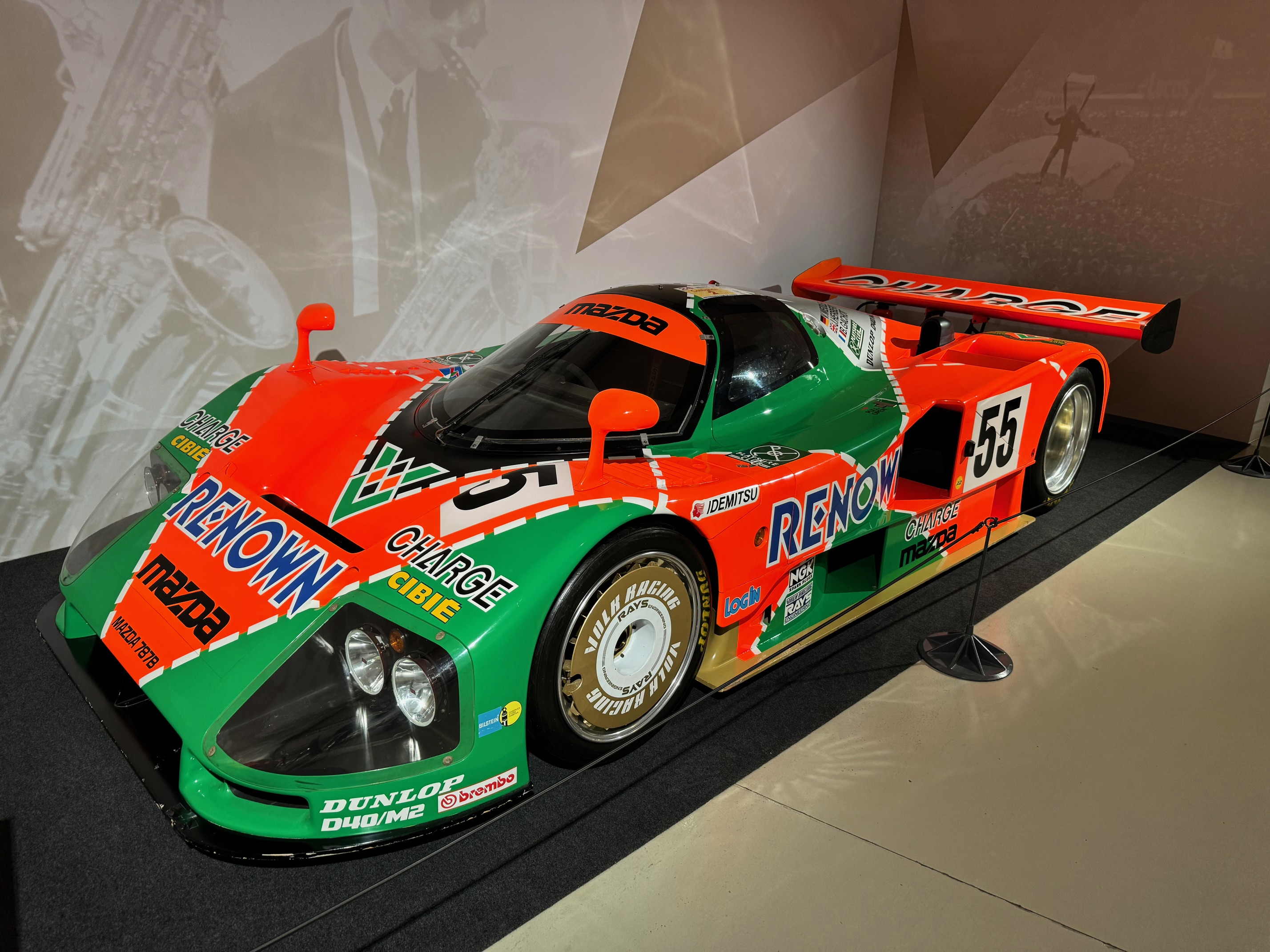
Mazda 787B

With their requisite C291 in the entry-list, the Sauber-Mercedes team brought a full team to support three C11 cars. The dominant Group C car of the previous year was based around the 5.0-litre M119 engine. The all-aluminium unit was now 6 kg lighter with the latest Bosch Motronic engine-management system. With twin-KKK (Kühnle, Kopp & Kausch) turbos, it could put out up to 850 bhp in qualifying trim, dialled back to 720 bhp for race-settings. The composite monocoque chassis had refined aerodynamics, including a new nose-section to give better airflow to the carbon brakes. Current drivers' champion, Jean-Louis Schlesser, shared the #1 car with regular teammate Jochen Mass, along with Alain Ferté. The three drivers of the Mercedes Junior Team were also cross-entered in the second C11, while the third was driven by Jonathan Palmer, Stanley Dickens and Kurt Thiim.

Mazda was the only Japanese company to contest the SWC, with a single car. They double-checked the regulations and confirmed that, indeed, FISA had let them retain the rotary-engine weight limit of only 830 kg. This loophole was not apparent at the start of the season, when the Mazda 787 had results of 6th, 7th and 11th. Meanwhile, Nigel Stroud at Mazdaspeed was developing the much improved Mazda 787B. This car had bigger wheels, reworked suspension and a slightly longer wheelbase. Extensive wind-tunnel testing improved the bodyshell with bigger ducts for new carbon brakes. Work on the quad-rotary engine improved its torque and fuel efficiency, while still maintaining its 710 bhp power output. The heaviest Mazda at scrutineering was still 150 kg lighter than the lightest Porsche in their class.

The team had kept Le Mans winner Jacky Ickx on board as a consultant. After doing the Dakar Rally with the ORECA team, he recommended that Mazdaspeed coordinate with Hugues de Chaunac and his organisation for their European race preparation.

Once again, three cars were entered, along with a test-car, and as before there were two of the latest model and a back-up from the previous year. The team knew this would be their last chance to win Le Mans before the new regulations took effect, banning the rotary engine. By now, the driver line-ups were veteran Mazda crews: Volker Weidler, Johnny Herbert and Bertrand Gachot were young F1 drivers and had raced as a trio in 1990. The second car had Stefan Johansson and David Kennedy joined by Brazilian Maurizio Sandro Sala, the only new member of the team. Their car was set up with a lower fifth gear ratio to use less fuel at the cost of 20 kp/h off their top speed. Yojiro Terada and Takashi Yorino were once again given the older car, this time with Pierre Dieudonné.

Porsche was now fully committed in Formula 1, supplying engines to the Footwork Arrows team, however motorsport director Helmut Flegl confirmed the company did not have the resources to also commit to an FIA Sportscar engine. Instead, it would again be the veteran Porsche 962C taking on the new cars in the championship. The Porsche teams all had to run with the heavy penalties of the Category 2. However, 13 Porsches were entered, outnumbering the whole Category 1 entry.

Only four teams were running Porsches in the World Championship, but the FISA dispensation allowed a number of others to come to Le Mans. Walter Brun was now preparing his own car for the new regulations, but meanwhile remained loyal to the SWC and committed to the full season. They took possession of what would be the very last Porsche 962C out of the Porsche factory just a fortnight before the race. It would be driven by Brun himself, with his usual co-drivers Oscar Larrauri and Jésus Pareja. His other entry was the car that had almost finished second the year before. It would be driven by Harald Huysman, Robbie Stirling and Bernard Santal.

The Cologne-based Kremer brothers had built two new cars of their CK6 variant of the 962. One was on a carbon/honeycomb monocoque (to be driven by Manuel Reuter, JJ Lehto and Harri Toivonen), while the other ran the standard factory aluminium hull (Gregor Foitek/Tiff Needell/Tomás López Rocha).

Like Brun, Franz Konrad was building his own Category 1 sportscar, but for Le Mans chose to race his 962 instead. This was another carbon/honeycomb monocoque in short-tail format and a 3.2-litre engine. Konrad had Anthony Reid and Pierre-Alain Lombardi as his co-drivers.

The Joest Racing team chose not to contest the SWC and was now racing in the German Interserie and came to Le Mans with two cars entered under Konrad Motorsport. Running this year with the short-tail set-up and a wider nose, Le Mans winners Derek Bell and Hans-Joachim Stuck were with Frank Jelinski, while the indefatigable Henri Pescarolo raced with Bernd Schneider and "John Winter" (Louis Krages).

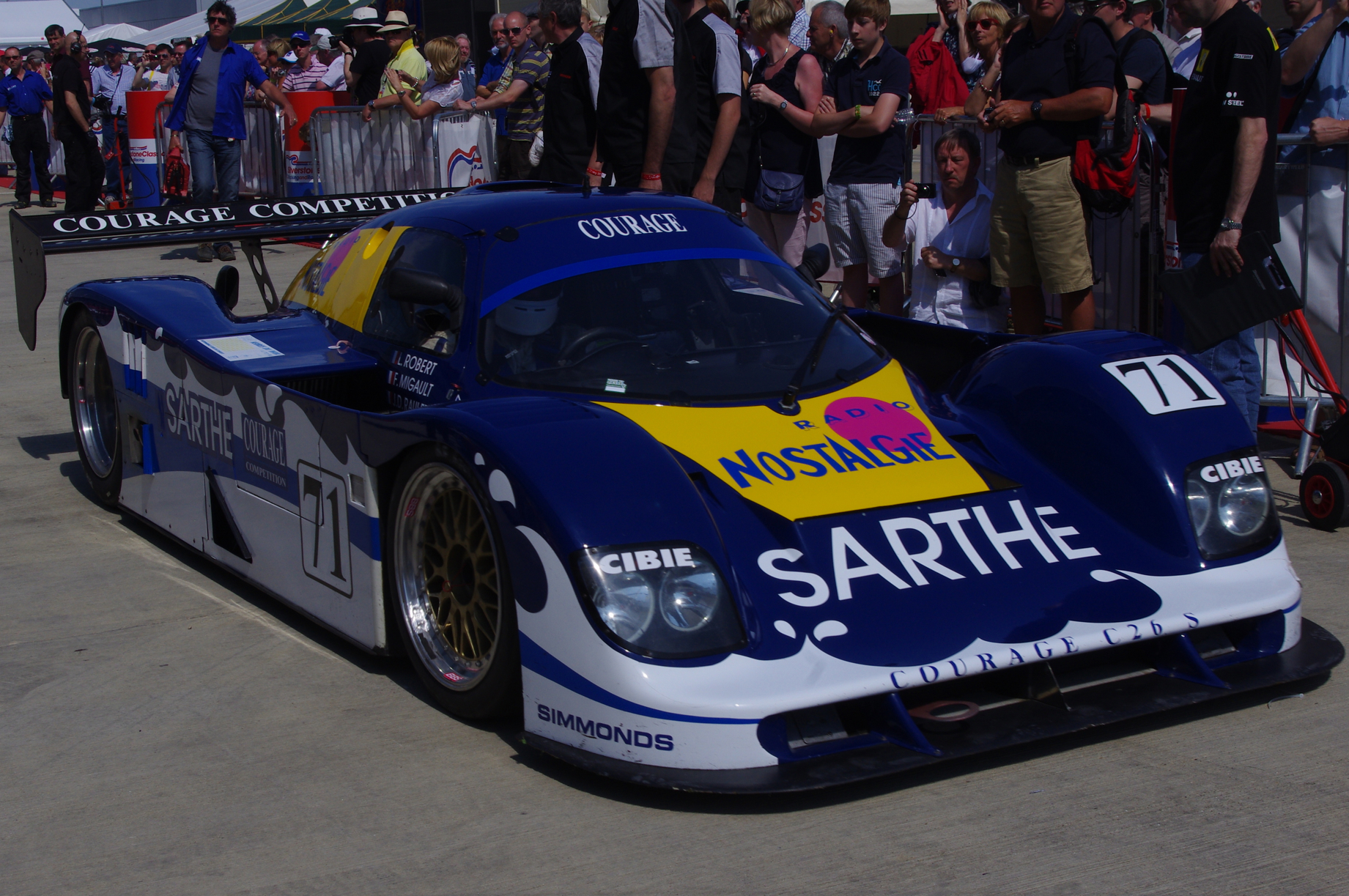
Cougar C26S

The Swiss Team Salamin Primagaz was the other team running a Porsche in the SWC. Antoine Salamin was an architect by trade and had raced a 962C at Le Mans three times previously. This 1-year-old chassis would be raced by Salamin and his regular series co-driver, Moroccan Max Cohen-Olivar, and joined by 8-time French hillclimb champion Marcel Tarrès.

Hans Obermaier was not entered in the SWC and had originally wanted to run a new Spice, but changed his mind and sold it back to Fedco. Instead, he brought his Porsche from last year, entering it through the Salamin team. As usual, Obermaier carried his Primagaz sponsorship, like his entry-sharers. Co-owner Jürgen Lässig, Pierre Yver and Jürgen Oppermann were the nominal line-up, but when the latter fell ill just before the race, his place was taken by Otto Altenbach giving them the same driver combination as the previous year.

Australian Vern Schuppan's team was in the Japanese championship and brought three cars to Le Mans, including a T-car, under the Salamin banner. The lead car would be run by Will Hoy, Eje Elgh and Roland Ratzenberger. The second car was a new 962 modification, designed by Max Boxstrom, formerly at Ecurie Ecosse and Aston Martin. The carbon chassis had radical aerodynamics, fitted with a short tail and a low-slung rear aerofoil off the back. However, the drivers (Hurley Haywood and James Weaver, in the JSPC, along with Wayne Taylor) found it unmanageable and it was swapped for the regular 962. Tim Lee-Davey had an ex-Schuppan car for his own privateer team and was also entered through the Salamin ticket.

Courage Compétition was running two cars in the World Championship. For his home race, Yves Courage put together a four-car team. Three were the new C26S model – honeycomb tubs with carbon-kevlar bodyshells. Marcel Hubert's design had an improved nose section to better process airflow and a smaller rear aerofoil. The suspension was also adjusted to remedy the understeer and accommodate the 50 kg FIA ballast penalty. Powered by the 3.0-litre Porsche, two were new cars while the third was a rebuilt C24 from 1990. Another C24, from 1989, was also entered, running an older 2.8-litre Porsche engine.

Courage had also made an arrangement with the Japanese Trust Racing to run as a Courage car at Fuji, and in exchange would then get an entry ticket for Le Mans. Their short-tail 962 ran the same Porsche engine as the Courage and was therefore eligible. Steven Andskär and George Fouché were one of only three two-driver teams racing this year. The other team coming in under the Courage patronage were the French Alméras brothers. They had entered Le Mans periodically through the 1980s driving Group C and GT Porsches without much success. They had run the 1990 season and brought their ex-Kremer 962C back for their one race of the year.

Italian Gianni Mussato had found a buyer for his remaining ex-works Lancia LC2. Durango was an Italian racing team competing in the British F3000 championship. Veneto Equipe was set up for a dabble in the SWC, but the LC2 was now an obsolete design, only qualifying for half the races it entered. The Ferrari 3050cc V8 engine could put out up to 800 bhp but this would be last time Lancia was at Le Mans.

== Practice and qualifying ==
The practice sessions were compromised by squally weather washing periodically across the track. The rain had stopped by the start of Wednesday evening practice and the cars were quickly back in the pits, changing off their wet tyres – only for the rain to return. In a very narrow window of dryness, Andy Wallace posted a 3:37.1 in the Jaguar XJR-14, easily the best time of the night. Only 50 of the drivers were able to put in times within 120% to qualify for the race. In the difficult weather, Desiré Wilson crashed at Tertre Rouge. The team was able to hire another Spice chassis from GP Motorsport and spent most of the next day to prepare the new day. Thursday followed a similar pattern, and it took 40 minutes to dry. However, at least it stayed dry thereafter and the track was crowded as people tried to post competitive times.

First notable time was Schlesser, with a 3:35.8, in his Sauber-Mercedes, while Alliot's Peugeot did a 3:37.6. Wallace responded with a 3:35.4 and was going quicker on his next lap, but had to pull out after his team-mate, Wollek, had a tyre blow out at full speed approaching the Indianapolis corner, right in front of Wallace. It was Wollek's experience that stopped his car slamming into the barriers. Then Schlesser pulled a 3:31.3 out the bag and that settled matters. Wallace improved to 3:31.9 to be second, and quickest of the Category 1 cars, but over-revved the race-engine in the process.

Alliot was third in the best of the Peugeots, and when TWR decided on Friday to withdraw the XJR-14 from the race, it became an all-Peugeot front row with Rosberg qualifying 8th overall with 3:35.1 (3rd in Category 1). The other two Mercedes were 4th and 5th. Larrauri was the quickest Porsche again with the Brun car, 6th (3:36.1) after a difficult practice shaking down their brand-new car. Manuel Reuter was 7th in the Kremer T-car after teammate Toivonen crashed the race-car in the Thursday session. Both were pleased to out-qualify the rival Joest cars, which started just behind them.

The Jaguar XJR-12s had given up competing for pole after the wet Thursday, and came in 11th, 18th, 21st and 22nd overall. The new Mazdas had a better qualifying, finishing 12th (3:43.5) and 17th. The radical new design of Team Schuppan was found undriveable by the team, and when the team-owner himself did laps and found the same, the car was swapped out for their other standard-issue 962. The time spent by AO Racing preparing their new car meant St James and Muller failed to get qualifying laps in, however the ACO used their discretion and allowed them onto the grid. But for the second year running, Tim Lee-Davey's team missed scrutineering in their rush to be ready. Poorly prepared, they failed to qualify.

In the end, only 11 of the 38 starters would be from the new Group 1 formula. Ten of those were mandated by FISA to take the front ten places on the starting grid. Behind the two Peugeots, third spot went to the Euro Racing Spice that had qualified a respectable 15th (3:45.7). However, the other cars in the top-10 came from far further down the list. The two Chamberlain Spices starting 9th and 10th had qualified in 38th (4:06) and 39th (4:10), over 30 seconds slower than the three Sauber-Mercedes starting just behind as the fastest of the Category 2 class.

=== Qualifying results ===
Class leaders are in bold. The fastest time set by each entry is denoted in gray.

Pos.	Class	No.	Team	Qualifying 1	Qualifying 2	Gap	Weight	Grid
1	Category 2	1	**(West Germany) Team Sauber Mercedes**	3:46.175	**3:31.270**		1010 kg	11
2	Category 1	4	**(United Kingdom) Silk Cut Jaguar**	**3:37.111**	**3:31.912**	+0.642	763 kg	DNS
3	Category 1	5	(France) Peugeot Talbot Sport	3:52.361	3:35.058	+3.788	754 kg	1
4	Category 2	31	(West Germany) Team Sauber Mercedes	4:04.895	3:35.265	+3.995	1008 kg	12
5	Category 2	32	(West Germany) Team Sauber Mercedes	3:50.484	3:35.957	+4.687	1010 kg	13
6	Category 2	17	(Switzerland) Repsol Brun Motorsport	3:53.168	3:36.114	+4.844	1007 kg	14
7	Category 2	11	(West Germany) Porsche Kremer Racing	4:01.867	3:36.848	+5.578	1002 kg	15
8	Category 1	6	(France) Peugeot Talbot Sport	3:42.028	3:38.886	+7.616	786 kg	2
9	Category 2	58	(Austria) Konrad Motorsport/ (Germany) Joest Racing	**3:43.283**	3:40.526	+9.256	1020 kg	16
10	Category 2	57	(Austria) Konrad Motorsport/ (Germany) Joest Racing	4:18.019	3:40.548	+9.278	1017 kg	17
11	Category 2	35	(United Kingdom) Silk Cut Jaguar	3:50.784	3:43.496	+12.226	1029 kg	18
12	Category 2	55	(Japan) Mazdaspeed	3:51.470	3:43.503	+12.233	845 kg	19
13	Category 2	12	(France) Courage Compétition	4:23.101	3:44.315	+13.045	1010 kg	20
14	Category 2	21	(Austria) Konrad Motorsport	3:57.441	3:45.214	+13.914	995 kg	21
15	Category 1	8	(Netherlands) Euro Racing	4:03.261	3:45.740	+14.470	805 kg	3
16	Category 2	49	(France) Courage Compétition/ (Japan) Trust Racing	4:43.575	3:46.181	+14.911	1020 kg	22
17	Category 2	18	(Japan) Mazdaspeed	3:50.398	3:46.641	+15.371	850 kg	23
18	Category 2	33	(United Kingdom) Silk Cut Jaguar	3:48.906	3:47.875	+16.605	1023 kg	24
19	Category 2	46	(West Germany) Porsche Kremer Racing	3:57.158	3:48.519	+17.249	1004 kg	25
20	Category 2	13	(France) Courage Compétition	4:39.604	3:48.664	+17.394	1019 kg	26
21	Category 2	34	(United Kingdom) Silk Cut Jaguar	3:55.403	3:49.748	+18.478	1023 kg	27
22	Category 2	36	(Japan) Suntec Jaguar	3:52.405	3:49.867	+18.597	1029 kg	28
23	Category 2	16	(Switzerland) Repsol Brun Motorsport	4:26.867	3:50.098	+18.828	1007 kg	29
24	Category 2	56	(Japan) Mazdaspeed	3:56.971	3:50.161	+18.891	850 kg	30
25	Category 2	51	(Switzerland) Team Salamin Primagaz/ (West Germany) Obermaier Racing	4:42.622	3:52.822	+21.552	1044 kg	31
26	Category 1	41	(Netherlands) Euro Racing/ (Japan) Team Fedco	4:24.142	3:53.833	+22.563	787 kg	4
27	Category 2	47	(France) Courage Compétition	4:32.226	3:54.480	+23.210	1004 kg	32
28	Category 1	37	(France) Automobiles Louis Descartes/ (France) ROC Compétition	4:47.451	3:55.446	+24.176	847 kg	5
29	Category 2	53	(Switzerland) Team Salamin Primagaz/ (Australia) Team Schuppan	4:31.663	3:55.706	+24.436	1026 kg	33
30	Category 2	50	(France) Courage Compétition/ (France) Equipe Alméras Frères	4:24.462	3:56.790	+25.520	1043 kg	34
31	Category 2	15	(Italy) Veneto Equipe	4:33.648	3:57.132	+25.862	1076 kg	35
32	Category 1	39	(France) Automobiles Louis Descartes/ (France) Graff Racing	4:13.248	3:57.298	+26.028	784 kg	6
33	Category 1	7	(France) Automobiles Louis Descartes	5:01.159	3:59.343	+28.073	814 kg	7
34	Category 2	14	(Switzerland) Team Salamin Primagaz	4:17.426	3:59.674	+28.404	1019 kg	36
35	Category 2	52	(Switzerland) Team Salamin Primagaz/ (Australia) Team Schuppan	4:26.038	4:01.761	+30.491	1016 kg	37
36	Category 1	43	(Netherlands) Euro Racing/ (United Kingdom) PC Automotive	4:22.556	4:02.519	+31.249	786 kg	8
37	Category 2	59	(Austria) Konrad Motorsport/ (West Germany) Joest Racing	4:05.839	No Time	+34.569	1020 kg	DNS
38	Category 1	45	(Netherlands) Euro Racing/ (United Kingdom) Chamberlain Engineering	4:46.597	4:06.578	+35.308	812 kg	9
39	Category 1	44	(Netherlands) Euro Racing/ (United Kingdom) Chamberlain Engineering	4:12.155	4:10.607	+39.337	817 kg	10
40	Category 1	40	(Netherlands) Euro Racing/ (Japan) A.O. Racing	4:56.563	4:11.781	+40.511	773 kg	38
41	Category 2	54	(Switzerland) Team Salamin Primagaz/ (United Kingdom) Team Davey	No Time	4:18.611	+47.341	?	DNQ
42	Category 2	42	(Netherlands) Euro Racing/ (United States) Classic Racing	5:09.145	No Time	+1:37.875	1010 kg	DNQ

== Race ==
=== Start ===
Although the morning warm-up was done in damp conditions, by the 4pm start-time, the day was overcast but dry. From the start, the two Peugeots jumped into the lead and set the pace. The spectators had some entertainment watching the faster Category 2 cars weave through the slower cars at the front of the grid. Alliot missed a gear on lap 2, and Rosberg was quickly through into the lead. By the third lap, Schlesser led his silver cars onto their tail. However, the Mercedes team soon fell back to their designated race-pace, allowing the Brun and two Joest Porsches through.

Schneider deliberately pitted his Porsche early, on lap 7, to go off-sequence and on lap 9, a charging Larrauri passed Schlesser into third. It was Rosberg who led to the first refuelling stops, coming in on lap 10 to hand over to Dalmas. A lap later, teammate Alliot came in for his stop. Suddenly, a spectacular fuel-fire enveloped the car. Quickly doused, Jabouille was pushed forward into their sister-car's pit-bay and finished refuelling before resuming in 22nd place. Dalmas now had a 30-second lead over Larrauri, who was being harried by Schneider's Joest Porsche and Schumacher's Mercedes. However, an intermittent misfire in Rosberg's stint had gotten worse and on lap 15, Dalmas pitted to get it checked, losing three minutes, before a second stop two laps later. A third stop, costing 45 minutes to changes its electronics box dropped them 11 laps down. Worse, while that was going on, Jabouille stopped the other Peugeot at Indianapolis with a blown engine.

It was the Sauber-Mercedes cars that picked up the baton, running 1–2–3. Despite a heavy shunt when lapping the Obermeier Porsche at the Ford Chicane, Schumacher was leading in the Mercedes Junior car. With the non-professional Pareja now driving, the Brun car gradually lost ground. Their car was also leaking oil after the hard charging and the drivers could only do short stints to allow oil refills every half-hour. Jaguar had been struggling to keep up with the pace. The extra weight and the bigger 7.4L engine were proving to be thirsty and they had to run 5–6 seconds slower to meet their necessary fuel consumption. Only Nielsen was able to keep up, running fifth after the second stops, with the two Joest cars close behind. The first Jaguar to strike trouble was the Suntec entry, when Martini stopped at the chicane with a faulty fuelpump. Within 3 laps, he then broke his suspension hitting a curb at the same chicane at 7pm. The whole front end had to be rebuilt, all up costing 2½ hours and 50 laps.

In the fourth hour, Schlesser reeled in the young Kreutzpointner, taking the lead on lap 60 before coming in to change over to Mass a lap later. The Junior team followed him in, but in his exuberance going back out, Wendlinger spun on his cold tyres at the Dunlop chicane and hit the tyre barrier. By the time he got all the back to the pits for repairs, the team had lost 6 minutes and dropped to ninth. The Kremer Porsche had been running 7th, when Reuter brought it in with rear suspension failure, costing 20 minutes. Due to the increased penalty weight, it would not be the last.

Going into the evening, the other two Mercedes kept their 1–2 lead, with a resurgent Larrauri in third ahead of the Warwick/Nielsen/Wallace Jaguar. After engine delays afflicted the Joest cars, it was the leading Mazda of Herbert/Weidler/Gachot leap-frogging them up into fifth, running like clockwork, while just behind the Porsches was the second Mazda. The order was shaken up in the sixth hour. At 9.25pm, an engine misfire caused Warwick to spin into the gravel-trap at Indianapolis, dropping him down to ninth while he got dragged out. Fifteen minutes later, Larrauri brought the Brun Porsche in with damaged rear suspension. The repairs cost them eight laps and took them out of contention.

=== Night ===
Hard driving by Wendlinger going into the night got his car back up to third. Schumacher was just as impressive when he took over, setting the fastest lap of the race at 10.45pm, with a 3:35.5, cutting almost 5 seconds off the lap record, set the previous year by Nissan. For the next few hours, most of the front-running cars ran well, while behind them the attrition was building. The Joest Porsche of Bell/Stuck/Jelinski was in and out of the pits with water-leaks and fell away. As predicted, most of the Category 1 cars had succumbed: Rosberg was well down the field when he coasted to a halt on the Mulsanne Straight. Losing gears with a broken gear-linkage spelt the end for the second Peugeot. The AO, PC and Chamberlain Spices, ALD and ROC had all retired or spent hours in the pits. In the early hours of the race, the “works” Fedco Spice was leading the class, closely pursued by the Euro Racing Spice, just outside the top-10. The latter took the class-lead early in the evening when the Japanese car suffered a radiator leak, until a fuel leak caused an engine fire approaching the Ford Chicane. That allowed the Fedco car to take the lead again into the darkness hours.

By 1am, Schlesser, Mass and Ferté had put a lap on their teammates with a 6-minute lead. The junior team took over second place when Palmer brought the other Mercedes into the pits complaining of chronic handling problems, after running over debris left by Hans Stuck's Porsche. Half an hour passed as debris damage to the undertray was remedied. To add to the alarm, both the other cars had extended stops to be inspected. The lower speed for the Jaguars meant their engines were putting less strain on the system and they were now running 3rd, 4th and 8th. However, at 2.30am, Warwick in the second car, came to a stop at Arnage. The fuel pump plug had worked loose and killed the engine. Taking advice over the radio from his crew, he was able to fashion a repair and get back to the pits.

At the halfway point, the #1 Mercedes (184) had almost a full lap's margin over their Junior car, themselves two laps over the leading Mazda (181) and the Jones/Boesel/Ferté Jaguar. Their teammates, the Fabi/Wollek/Acheson car was a lap further back and the two Joest cars and the second Mazda chasing (180 laps). Ninth was the third Jaguar (177), recovering quickly with the Andskär/Fouché Trust Racing Porsche rounding out the top-10.

Then at 4.50am, just nine minutes into his stint, Wendlinger brought the second-placed Mercedes into the pits stuck in fourth gear. Although they spent over half an hour in the pits and lost 8 laps, the race-attrition meant they only fell 7 places. They soon moved up a spot when the Schneider/Pescarolo/”Winter” Joest Porsche retired from 8th with an incurable gearbox leak.

Jaguar were having their own tribulations: in the 15th hour, Wallace lost 3 laps, and one place, when he planted his car into the gravel at the first chicane, then Martini crashed at Tertre Rouge and Acheson came in for a new nose-section after hitting a rabbit.

In the crippled Category 1 class, at the halfway point it was the Graff Racing Spice that had been leading since midnight, with the Fedco Spice recovering in second after yet more engine delays. Then the Graff car's engine began misfiring, necessitating a long, and ultimately fruitless, attempt at repairs, forcing their retirement in the 14th hour.

=== Morning ===
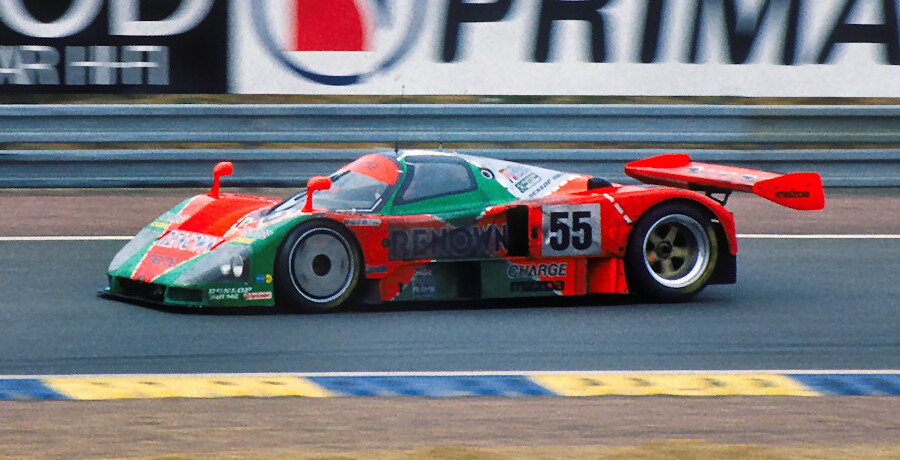
Herbert leading in the Mazda

As dawn was breaking, the Sauber-Mercedes was still in front with a comfortable three-lap lead but having overheating issues. The Mazda and lead Jaguar were battling for second, swapping places with pit-stops. However, with the Mazda able to lap 5 seconds faster, it was gradually able to pull away. After its long delay repairing undertray damage, Dickens had got the third Mercedes back up to tenth when he pitted at 7.15am. The original impact had created an engine vibration, that eventually broke an engine mount. Damage was terminal, so it had to be retired.

Running as high as 4th at dawn, the remaining Joest Porsche had slipped back to sixth. Then around 9am, Jelinski pulled up at Arnage just behind Krosnoff in the wretched Suntec Jaguar, also stopped there. The drivers worked side-by-side trying to get their cars going, though only Jelinski was able to get back to the pits. The screaming Mazda was now secure in second, as the two Jaguars fell back conserving fuel. The second Mazda had been in fifth, but then lost time getting a driveshaft replaced. The Brun Porsche had been vying for the lead in the early part of the race. They had slowly made their way back up to tenth until they were delayed again with yet another suspension rebuild, this time of the front.

At 10am after 18 hours, the Mercedes had done 275 laps with its three-lap lead over the #55 Mazda. Behind the two Jaguars (271, 270) was the Mercedes of the Junior team (268). The field was very spread out now, with the other Jaguar in sixth chased by the delayed Mazda (both 266), and the Joest car (261), third Mazda (260) and Kremer Porsche (257) rounding out the top-10.

Late in the morning, Schumacher brought his Mercedes in with overheating. A drivebelt for the water pump was replaced, dropping a place to the recovering Warwick/Nielsen/Wallace Jaguar. Occasional puffs of smoke on the lead car was increasing tension in the Mercedes camp.

=== Finish and post-race ===
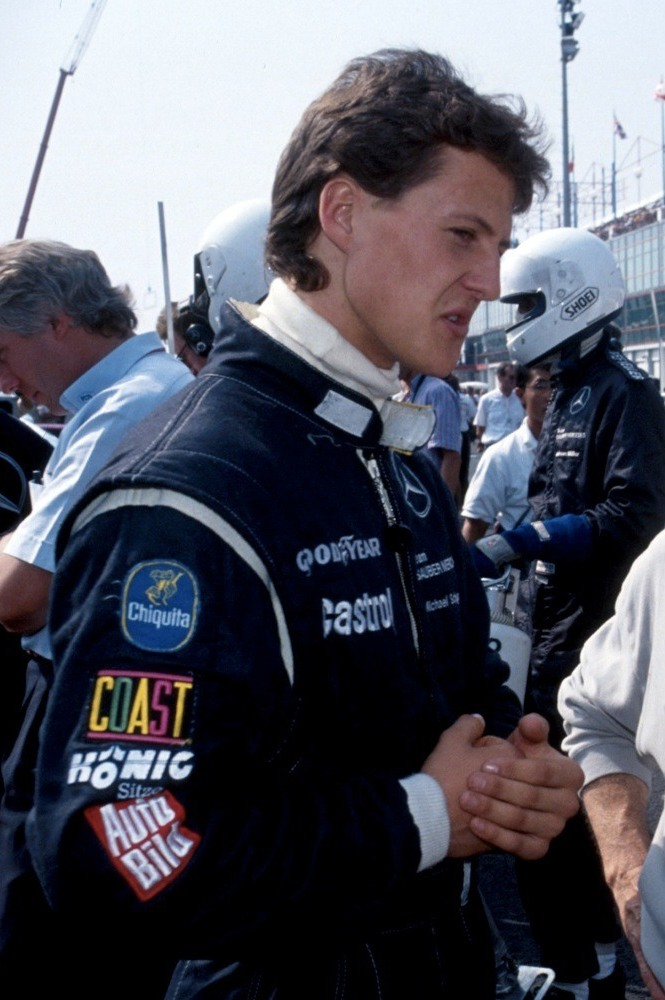
Michael Schumacher finished fifth for the Team Sauber Mercedes, before joining Formula One.

Their concerns were realised at 12:50pm: Ferté was given an urgent radio call to immediately pit, as the engine temperature was spiralling. Once at the pits, the pitcrew clustered around feverishly. Several attempts to restart the engine created big clouds of white smoke, pointing to a major problem. As the starter motor and waterpump were replaced, the three-lap lead evaporated, and a big cheer went up in the grandstand opposite when Weidler's Mazda shrieked past into the lead at 1:05. Ferté finally left at 1:28, but only managed one lap before returning to the pits. After leading for almost 17 hours, it was a broken alternator bracket, a proverbial “$1 part”, that allowed the waterpump belt to come off. Without its water-cooling, the engine got cooked and their race was done. Weidler came in at 2pm to hand over to Herbert. The German was weary but exuberant.

"It's unbelievable. There's nothing wrong with the car, no problem at all, just tyre changes, petrol and go. We were driving very hard during the night and yesterday, but now we're backing off a little bit. We can go quicker if we have to, but the drivers are a little bit tired, so we take a bit more care. But we have no problems, the gearbox is perfect. I've done my job now."

Behind them the three Jaguars, being driven by Jones, Fabi and Nielsen, were unable to push any harder to close the gap. Herbert pitted for his last stop at 3:41 to run to the finish. Once again, the spectators invaded the track preventing the cars from taking the chequered flag. Despite TWR having their most reliable run at Le Mans, the team came away without a victory. The three cars finished 2-3-4 all two laps apart, led home by the IMSA car of Jones/Boesel/Ferté two laps behind the Mazda. Despite running very hot in the final two hours, Kreutzpointner brought the surviving Sauber-Mercedes home in fifth, having lost a place in the final hour. To cap a great weekend for Mazda, their second car came home in sixth (having only lost a quarter-hour in the morning replacing a driveshaft) and the third, older, car in eighth. Between them was the Joest Porsche, having had a frustrating race putting up with water leaks, and nine stops to replace coolant. In the swansong for the 962, with the Kremer and Brun cars filling out the top-10. The Cougar of Migault/Robert/Raulet was 11th, while the final classified car in 12th, and only Category 1 finisher, was the Fedco Spice, fully 36 laps and almost 500 km behind the winners.

Johnny Herbert did not make it to the podium with his team-mates. The stress and effort of the final two-hour stint (and not having slept anytime over the 24 hours) left him totally exhausted and dehydrated. He collapsed as he got out the car and had to be taken to the medical centre.

Despite its trials, the winner of the Index of Energy Efficiency was the Sauber-Mercedes. The silver cars were consistently more fuel-efficient than their rivals – the #1 car was recording a consumption of 49.8 litres/100 km compared to the Mazdas (52.6) or Jaguars (54.4). The decision by the FIA not to include rotary engines in their Group C handicapping had significantly helped Mazda. It gave them a higher power-to-weight ratio (760 bhp per tonne) compared to the Jaguars and Mercedes (730 bhp per tonne) and Porsche (720). The lighter weight also made it easier on their tyres and new carbon brakes, while the extra ballast compromised the Jaguar's performance. Having the talismanic Jacky Ickx as a consultant also contributed with his vast experience in endurance racing strategy. After all the time and investment by Nissan and Toyota over the past decade, it was Mazda, building on their recent success in IMSA, that became the first Japanese manufacturer to win overall at Le Mans, and likely the only rotary-engined car to do so. Such was the impact it had in Japan, that their television channels broke into their programming to show the final 8 hours of the race.

In an unusual season, Rosberg and Dalmas retired from 7 of their races but won the other two, at Magny-Cours and Mexico City. Peugeot was beaten to the championship by Jaguar, and Teo Fabi also won the Drivers' Championship for Jaguar.

Mercedes was planning to move into Formula 1, as was FISA's desire. However, even the biggest manufacturers had to focus resources and in December, the company closed its Sportscar program and withdrew from the World Championship. They followed Porsche, who had supplied Footwork in Formula 1 but chose not to start development of an engine for an SWC car. Ironically, Footwork abandoned the Porsche engine after Le Mans for the upcoming French Grand Prix, and reverted to the Ford-Cosworth for the rest of the season. Worse followed Brun Motorsport – their own entry, the Brun C91, entered the SWC from the next race at the Nürburgring. It was an expensive and unsuccessful enterprise, and following the failure of their EuroBrun Formula 1 team, spelled the end of the stalwart Porsche team and it was wound up at the end of the year.

== Official results ==
=== Finishers ===
Results taken from Quentin Spurring's book, officially licensed by the ACO.
Class winners are in bold text.

Pos	Class	No.	Team	Drivers	Chassis	Engine	Tyre	Laps
1	**Category 2**	**55**	**(Japan) Mazdaspeed**	(United Kingdom) Johnny Herbert (West Germany) Volker Weidler (Belgium) Bertrand Gachot	Mazda 787B	Mazda R26B 2.6L quad-rotary	D	362
2	Category 2	35	(United Kingdom) Silk Cut Jaguar Team (United Kingdom) Tom Walkinshaw Racing	(United States) Davy Jones (Brazil) Raul Boesel (France) Michel Ferté	Jaguar XJR-12LM	Jaguar HE 7.4L V12	G	360
3	Category 2	34	(United Kingdom) Silk Cut Jaguar Team (United Kingdom) Tom Walkinshaw Racing	(France) Bob Wollek (Italy) Teo Fabi (United Kingdom) Kenny Acheson	Jaguar XJR-12LM	Jaguar HE 7.4L V12	G	358
4	Category 2	33	(United Kingdom) Silk Cut Jaguar Team (United Kingdom) Tom Walkinshaw Racing	(United Kingdom) Derek Warwick (Denmark) John Nielsen (United Kingdom) Andy Wallace	Jaguar XJR-12LM	Jaguar HE 7.4L V12	G	356
5	Category 2	31	(West Germany) Team Sauber Mercedes	(West Germany) Michael Schumacher (Austria) Karl Wendlinger (West Germany) Fritz Kreutzpointner	Mercedes-Benz C11	Mercedes-Benz M119 5.0L V8 twin turbo	G	355
6	Category 2	18	(Japan) Mazdaspeed	(Sweden) Stefan Johansson (Republic of Ireland) David Kennedy (Brazil) Maurizio Sandro Sala	Mazda 787B	Mazda R26B 2.6L quad-rotary	D	355
7	Category 2	58	(Austria) Konrad Motorsport (West Germany) Joest Porsche Racing	(United Kingdom) Derek Bell (West Germany) Hans-Joachim Stuck (West Germany) Frank Jelinski	Porsche 962C	Porsche 935/82 3.2L F6 twin turbo	G	347
8	Category 2	56	(Japan) Mazdaspeed	(Japan) Yojiro Terada (Belgium) Pierre Dieudonné (Japan) Takashi Yorino	Mazda 787	Mazda R26B 2.6L quad-rotary	D	346
9	Category 2	11	(West Germany) Porsche Kremer Racing	(West Germany) Manuel Reuter (Finland) JJ Lehto (Finland) Harri Toivonen	Porsche 962C-K6	Porsche 935/82 3.2L F6 twin turbo	Y	343
10	Category 2	17	(Switzerland) Repsol Brun Motorsport	(Switzerland) Walter Brun (Argentina) Oscar Larrauri (Spain) Jesús Pareja	Porsche 962C	Porsche 935/82 3.2L F6 twin turbo	Y	338
11	Category 2	12	(France) Courage Compétition	(France) François Migault (France) Lionel Robert (France) Jean-Daniel Raulet	Cougar C26S	Porsche 935/83 3.0L F6 twin turbo	G	331
12	**Category 1**	**41**	**(Netherlands) Euro Racing** **(Japan) Team Fedco**	**(Japan) Kiyoshi Misaki** **(Japan) Hisashi Yokoshima** **(Japan) Naoki Nagasaka**	Spice SE90C	Cosworth DFZ 3.5L V8	G	326
NC	Category 2	53	(Switzerland) Salamin Primagaz (Australia) Team Schuppan	(United States) Hurley Haywood (United Kingdom) James Weaver (South Africa) Wayne Taylor	Porsche 962C	Porsche 935 3.0L F6 twin turbo	D	316
NC	Category 2	47	(France) Courage Compétition	(France) Michel Trollé (Canada) Claude Bourbonnais (Italy) Marco Brand	Cougar C26S	Porsche 935/83 3.0L F6 twin turbo	G	293
NC	Category 1	43	(Netherlands) Euro Racing (United Kingdom) PC Automotive	(United Kingdom) Richard Piper (France) Olindo Iacobelli (France) Jean-Louis Ricci	Spice SE89C	Cosworth DFZ 3.5L V8	G	280
NC	Category 2	15	(Italy) Veneto Equipe (private entrant)	(Italy) Luigi Giorgio (Italy) Almo Coppelli	Lancia LC2	Ferrari 308C 3.1L V8 twin turbo	D	111

- Note *: Not Classified; did not cover sufficient distance (70% of the winner) by the race's end.

=== Did not finish ===
Pos	Class	No	Team	Drivers	Chassis	Engine	Tyre	Laps	Reason
DNF	Category 2	1	(West Germany) Team Sauber Mercedes	(France) Jean-Louis Schlesser (West Germany) Jochen Mass (France) Alain Ferté	Mercedes-Benz C11	Mercedes-Benz M119 5.0L V8 twin turbo	G	319	Engine (22hr)
DNF	Category 2	49	(France) Courage Compétition (Japan) Trust Racing	(Sweden) Steven Andskär (South Africa) George Fouché	Porsche 962C	Porsche 935 3.2L F6 twin turbo	D	316	Transmission (24hr)
DNF	Category 2	51	(Switzerland) Salamin Primagaz (West Germany) Obermaier Racing	(West Germany) Jürgen Lässig (France) Pierre Yver (West Germany) Otto Altenbach	Porsche 962C	Porsche 935 3.2L F6 twin turbo	G	232	Suspension (17hr)
DNF	Category 2	32	(West Germany) Team Sauber Mercedes	(United Kingdom) Jonathan Palmer (Sweden) Stanley Dickens (Denmark) Kurt Thiim	Mercedes-Benz C11	Mercedes-Benz M119 5.0L V8 twin turbo	G	223	Engine (16hr)
DNF	Category 2	52	(Switzerland) Salamin Primagaz (Australia) Team Schuppan	(Sweden) Eje Elgh (United Kingdom) Will Hoy (Austria) Roland Ratzenberger	Porsche 962C	Porsche 935 3.0L F6 twin turbo	D	202	Engine (16hr)
DNF	Category 2	57	(Austria) Konrad Motorsport (West Germany) Joest Porsche Racing	(France) Henri Pescarolo (West Germany) Bernd Schneider (West Germany) "John Winter" (Louis Krages)	Porsche 962C	Porsche 935/82 3.2L F6 twin turbo	G	197	Gearbox (14hr)
DNF	Category 2	36	(Japan) Suntec Jaguar (United Kingdom) Tom Walkinshaw Racing	(United Kingdom) David Leslie (Italy) Mauro Martini (United States) Jeff Krosnoff	Jaguar XJR-12LM	Jaguar HE 7.4L V12	G	183	Transmission (18hr)
DNF	Category 1	39	(France) Automobiles Louis Descartes (France) Graff Racing	(France) Xavier Lapeyre (France) Jean-Philippe Grand (France) Michel Maisonneuve	Spice SE89C	Cosworth DFZ 3.5L V8	G	163	Engine (14hr)
DNF	Category 2	16	(Switzerland) Repsol Brun Motorsport	(Norway) Harald Huysman (Canada) Robbie Stirling (Switzerland) Bernard Santal	Porsche 962C	Porsche 935 3.2L F6 twin turbo	Y	138	Engine (10hr)
DNF	Category 1	45	(Netherlands) Euro Racing (United Kingdom) Chamberlain Engineering	(United Kingdom) Nick Adams (United Kingdom) Robin Donovan (United Kingdom) Richard Jones	Spice SE89C	Cosworth DFZ 3.5L V8	G	128	Electrics (14hr)
DNF	Category 2	14	(Switzerland) Salamin Primagaz	(Switzerland) Antoine Salamin (Morocco) Max Cohen-Olivar (France) Marcel Tarrès	Porsche 962C	Porsche 935 3.2L F6 twin turbo	G	101	Engine (9hr)
DNF	Category 2	21	(Austria) Konrad Motorsport	(Austria) Franz Konrad (United Kingdom) Anthony Reid (Switzerland) Pierre-Alain Lombardi	Porsche 962C	Porsche 935 3.2L F6 twin turbo	Y	98	Engine (8hr)
DNF	Category 2	50	(France) Courage Compétition (France) Equipe Alméras Frères	(France) Jacques Alméras (France) Jean-Marie Alméras (France) Pierre de Thoisy	Porsche 962C	Porsche 935 3.0L F6 twin turbo	G	86	Accident (8hr)
DNF	Category 1	44	(Netherlands) Euro Racing (United Kingdom) Chamberlain Engineering	(United Kingdom) John Sheldon (France) Ferdinand de Lesseps (United Kingdom) Charles Rickett	Spice SE89C	Cosworth DFZ 3.5L V8	G	85	Electrics (14hr)
DNF	Category 1	8	(Netherlands) Euro Racing	(Netherlands) Charles Zwolsman (Netherlands) Cor Euser (United Kingdom) Tim Harvey	Spice SE90C	Cosworth DFZ 3.5L V8	G	72	Fire (6hr)
DNF	Category 1	6	(France) Peugeot Talbot Sport	(Finland) Keke Rosberg (France) Yannick Dalmas (France) Pierre-Henri Raphanel	Peugeot 905	Peugeot SA35-A1 3.5L V10	M	68	Gearbox (6hr)
DNF	Category 1	40	(Netherlands) Euro Racing (Japan) A.O. Racing (private entrant)	(South Africa) Desiré Wilson (United States) Lyn St. James (France) Cathy Muller	Spice SE90C	Cosworth DFZ 3.5L V8	D	47	Accident (6hr)
DNF	Category 2	13	(France) Courage Compétition	(United Kingdom) Johnny, Earl Dumfries (Sweden) Anders Olofsson (Sweden) Thomas Danielsson	Cougar C26S	Porsche 935/83 3.0L F6 twin turbo	G	45	Engine (6hr)
DNF	Category 1	37	(France) Automobiles Louis Descartes (France) ROC Compétition	(Switzerland) Bernard Thuner (France) Pascal Fabre	ROC 002	Cosworth DFR 3.5L V8	G	38	Transmission (6hr)
DNF	Category 1	5	(France) Peugeot Talbot Sport	(France) Jean-Pierre Jabouille (France) Philippe Alliot (Italy) Mauro Baldi	Peugeot 905	Peugeot SA35-A1 3.5L V10	M	22	Engine (6hr)
DNF	Category 2	46	(West Germany) Porsche Kremer Racing	(Switzerland) Gregor Foitek (Mexico) Tomás López Rocha (United Kingdom) Tiff Needell	Porsche 962C-K6	Porsche 935/82 3.2L F6 twin turbo	Y	18	Accident (6hr)
DNF	Category 1	7	(France) Automobiles Louis Descartes (private entrant)	(France) Philippe de Henning (Italy) Luigi Taverna (France) Patrick Gonin	ALD C91	Cosworth DFR 3.5L V8	G	16	Gearbox (12hr)

=== Did not start ===
Pos	Class	No	Team	Drivers	Chassis	Engine	Tyre	Reason
DNS	Category 1	2	(West Germany) Team Sauber Mercedes	(West Germany) Michael Schumacher (Austria) Karl Wendlinger (West Germany) Fritz Kreutzpointner	Mercedes-Benz C291	Mercedes-Benz M291 3.5L F12	G	Withdrawn
DNP	Category 1	3	(United Kingdom) Silk Cut Jaguar Team (United Kingdom) Tom Walkinshaw Racing	(United Kingdom) Derek Warwick (United Kingdom) Andy Wallace	Jaguar XJR-14	Ford-Cosworth HB 3.5L V8	G	Withdrawn
DNS	Category 1	4	(United Kingdom) Silk Cut Jaguar Team (United Kingdom) Tom Walkinshaw Racing	(United Kingdom) Andy Wallace (Italy) Teo Fabi (United Kingdom) Kenny Acheson	Jaguar XJR-14	Ford-Cosworth HB 3.5L V8	G	Withdrawn
DNS	Category 2	59	(Austria) Konrad Motorsport (West Germany) Joest Porsche Racing	(Austria) Franz Konrad (West Germany) Jürgen Barth	Porsche 962C	Porsche 935 3.0L F6 twin turbo	G	Withdrawn
DNQ	Category 2	42	(Netherlands) Euro Racing (United States) Classic Racing (private entrant)	(United Kingdom) Justin Bell (Japan) Syunji Kasuya	Spice SE89P	Ferrari 308C 3.2L V8 twin turbo	G	Did not qualify
DNQ	Category 2	54	(Switzerland) Salamin Primagaz (United Kingdom) Team Davey (private entrant)	(Japan) Katsunori Iketani (Austria) Mercedes Stermitz (Italy) / (United Kingdom) Val Musetti	Porsche 962C	Porsche 935 3.2L F6 twin turbo	G	Did not qualify
DSQ	Category 1	38	(France) Automobiles Louis Descartes (United Kingdom) Berkeley Team London (private entrant)	(Italy) Ranieri Randaccio (Italy) "Stingbrace" (Stefano Sebastiani) (Italy) Mirko Savoldi	Spice SE90C	Cosworth DFZ 3.5L V8		Failed scrutineering: racing licenses invalid
DSQ	Category 2	48	(France) Courage Compétition	(United Kingdom) Chris Hodgetts (United Kingdom) Andrew Hepworth (France) Thierry Lacerf	Cougar C24S	Porsche 935/83 3.0L F6 twin turbo	G	Failed scrutineering: underweight

=== Class winners ===
Class	Winning car	Winning drivers
Category 1	#41 Spice SE90C	Misaki / Yokoshima / Nagasaka *
Category 2	#55 Mazda 787B	Herbert / Weidler / Gachot *
Note *: setting a new class distance record for the circuit.

=== Index of Energy Efficiency ===
Pos	Class	No	Team	Drivers	Chassis	Score
1	Category 2	31	(West Germany) Team Sauber Mercedes	(West Germany) Michael Schumacher (Austria) Karl Wendlinger (West Germany) Fritz Kreutzpointner	Mercedes-Benz C11	-1.412
2	Category 2	55	(Japan) Mazdaspeed	(United Kingdom) Johnny Herbert (West Germany) Volker Weidler (Belgium) Bertrand Gachot	Mazda 787B	-6.269
3	Category 2	34	(United Kingdom) Silk Cut Jaguar Team (United Kingdom) Tom Walkinshaw Racing	(France) Bob Wollek (Italy) Teo Fabi (United Kingdom) Kenny Acheson	Jaguar XJR-12LM	-6.839
4	Category 2	17	(Switzerland) Repsol Brun Motorsport	(Switzerland) Walter Brun (Argentina) Oscar Larrauri (Spain) Jesús Pareja	Porsche 962C	-7.145
5	Category 2	11	(West Germany) Porsche Kremer Racing	(West Germany) Manuel Reuter (Finland) JJ Lehto (Finland) Harri Toivonen	Porsche 962C-K6	-7.414
6	Category 2	35	(United Kingdom) Silk Cut Jaguar Team (United Kingdom) Tom Walkinshaw Racing	(United States) Davy Jones (Brazil) Raul Boesel (France) Michel Ferté	Jaguar XJR-12LM	-7.627
7	Category 2	18	(Japan) Mazdaspeed	(Sweden) Stefan Johansson (Republic of Ireland) David Kennedy (Brazil) Maurizio Sandro Sala	Mazda 787B	-8.045
8	Category 2	33	(United Kingdom) Silk Cut Jaguar Team (United Kingdom) Tom Walkinshaw Racing	(United Kingdom) Derek Warwick (Denmark) John Nielsen (United Kingdom) Andy Wallace	Jaguar XJR-12LM	-8.198
9	Category 2	58	(Austria) Konrad Motorsport (West Germany) Joest Porsche Racing	(United Kingdom) Derek Bell (West Germany) Hans-Joachim Stuck (West Germany) Frank Jelinski	Porsche 962C	-10.223
10	Category 2	56	(Japan) Mazdaspeed	(Japan) Yojiro Terada (Belgium) Pierre Dieudonné (Japan) Takashi Yorino	Mazda 787B	-13.244

- Note: Only the top ten positions are included in this set of standings.

=== Statistics ===
Taken from Quentin Spurring's book, officially licensed by the ACO

- Pole position – J-L. Schlesser, #1 Mercedes-Benz C11- 3:31.3secs; 231.7 km/h (144.0 mph)
- Fastest lap – M. Schumacher, #31 Mercedes-Benz C11- 3:35.6secs; 227.1 km/h (141.1 mph)
- Winning distance – 4,922.81 km (3,058.89 mi)
- Winner's average speed – 205.3 km/h (127.6 mph)
- Attendance – 230,000

== Notes ==
World Sportscar Championship
Previous race: 1991 430km of Silverstone	1991 season	Next race: 1991 430km of Nürburgring
