= Fritz Kreutzpointner =

German racing driver (born 1967)

- Nationality: (Germany) German
- Born: Fritz Kreutzpointner III; 14 September 1967 (age 58); Burghausen, West Germany

24 Hours of Le Mans career
- Years: 1991
- Teams: Sauber
- Best finish: 5th (1991)
- Class wins: 0

Fritz Kreutzpointner III (born 14 September 1967) is a German former racing driver who competed alongside Michael Schumacher and Karl Wendlinger in the 1991 24 Hours of Le Mans with Mercedes.

== Biography ==
After rising through the German Formula Ford Championship, Kreutzpointner raced for Mercedes in the German Touring Car Championship and World Sportscar Championship between 1990 and 1992 with limited success before retiring from professional motor racing to concentrate on his business career. He returned to motorsport to compete in the FIA European Truck Racing Championship and even won it on two occasions in 1999 and 2001.

Kreutzpointner's twin daughters, Alesia and Jacqueline, are also racing drivers.

== Career record ==
=== 24 Hours of Le Mans results ===
Year	Team	Co-Drivers	Car	Class	Laps	Pos.	Class Pos.
1991	(Germany) Team Sauber Mercedes	(Germany) Michael Schumacher (Austria) Karl Wendlinger	Mercedes-Benz C11	C2	355	5th	5th
