= Mercedes-Benz C11 =

1990 Group C prototype race car

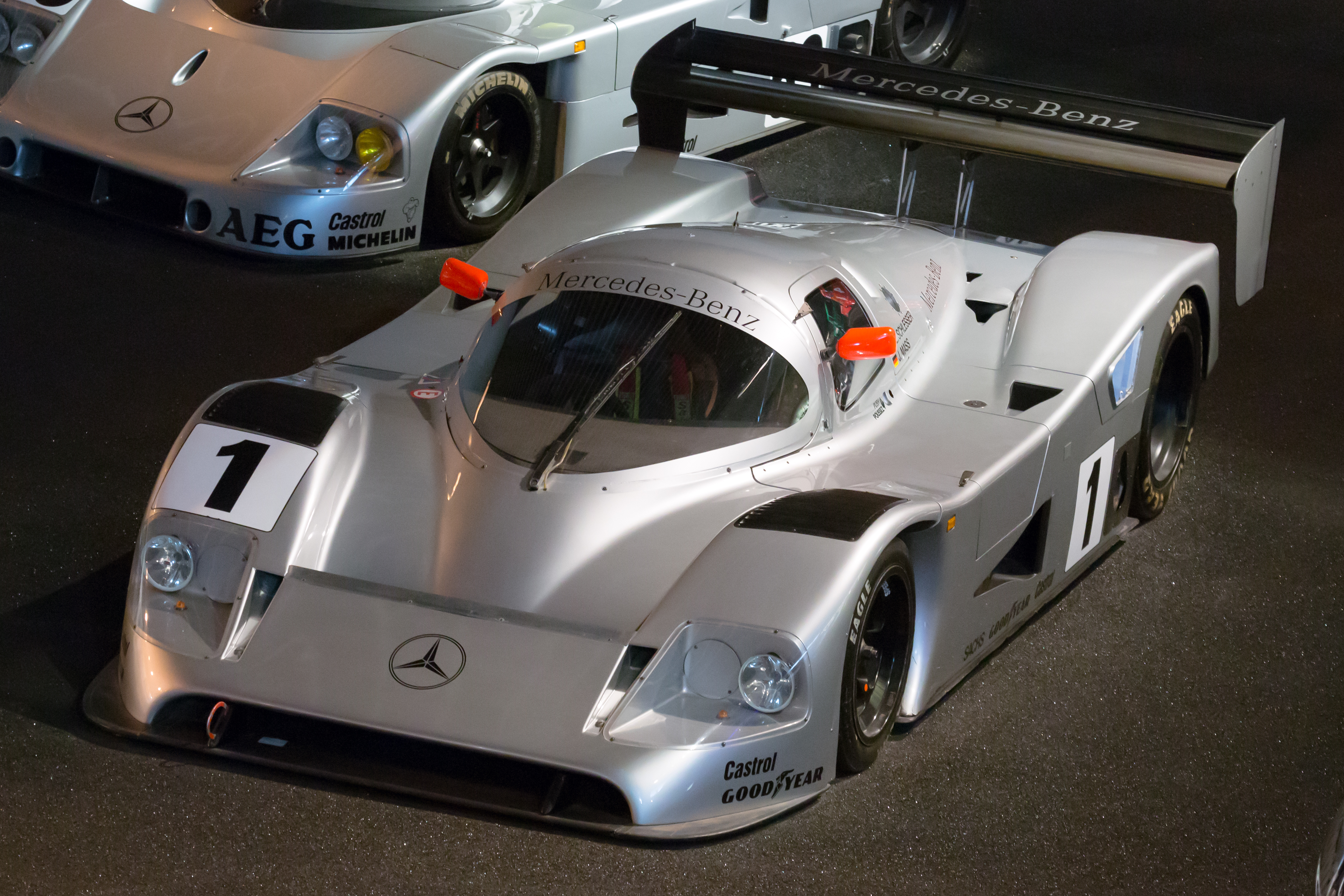
- The No. 1 C11 on display at the Mercedes-Benz Museum
- Category: Group C Prototype
- Constructor: Mercedes-Benz; Sauber Motorsport
- Designer(s): Leo Ress; Peter Sauber
- Predecessor: Sauber C9
- Successor: Mercedes-Benz C291

Technical specifications
- Chassis: Carbon-kevlar monocoque
- Suspension (front): double wishbones, push-rod operated coil springs over shock absorbers, torsion bar stabilizer
- Suspension (rear): double wishbones, push-rod operated coil springs over shock absorbers, torsion bar stabilizer
- Length: 4,800 mm (189.0 in)
- Width: 2,000 mm (78.7 in)
- Height: 1,030 mm (40.6 in)
- Axle track: 1,560 mm (61.4 in)
- Wheelbase: 2,770 mm (109.1 in)
- Engine: Mercedes-Benz M119 4,973 cc (303.5 cu in) HL 90° 5.0L Turbo V8 Twin KKK Turbos Mid, longitudinally mounted
- Transmission: 5-speed Manual transmission
- Power: 730-850 hp (545-634 kW) at 7,000 rpm 950-960 hp (716 kW) @ 7,000 rpm (unrestricted)
- Weight: 905 kg (1,995.2 lb)
- Fuel: Bosch Motronic MP 1.8 Fuel Injection
- Tyres: Goodyear

Competition history
- Notable entrants: (Germany) Team Sauber Mercedes
- Notable drivers: (Italy) Mauro Baldi (France) Jean-Louis Schlesser (Germany) Jochen Mass (Austria) Karl Wendlinger (Germany) Michael Schumacher (Germany) Heinz-Harald Frentzen (Germany) Fritz Kreutzpointner (France) Alain Ferté (United Kingdom) Jonathan Palmer (Sweden) Stanley Dickens (Denmark) Kurt Thiim
- Debut: 1990 480 km of Monza
- First win: 1990 480 km of Monza
- Last win: 1990 480 km of Mexico City
- Last event: 1991 24 Hours of Le Mans
Races	Wins	Poles	F/Laps
12	7	8	9
- Constructors' Championships: 1 (1990)
- Drivers' Championships: 1 (Jean-Louis Schlesser, 1990)

1990 Mercedes-Benz C11
Sauber-Mercedes C11 at Goodwood Festival of Speed 2009

The Mercedes-Benz C11 is a Group C prototype race car introduced for the 1990 World Sports-Prototype Championship. Built by Sauber as a successor to the Sauber C9, the C11 used the same Mercedes-Benz M119 5.0L twin turbo V8. It was the first time that Mercedes-Benz chose to put their name on the car, instead of simply using Sauber.

== Development ==
Following on the success of the Sauber C9, the Mercedes-Benz C11 was the last Group C prototype built by the Sauber Mercedes team before the introduction of the 3.5 litre category. Whereas, the C9 chassis had been constructed mostly from aluminium, the C11 was built from carbon fibre. The chassis was designed from scratch by Leo Ress, who had been with the team since the days of the Sauber C7, and the first example was built by local Swiss firm Nobrac ("carbon" spelt backwards). The remainder were built by DPS Composites in Surrey, UK whose principal, Dave Price, was also a team manager at Sauber. The new chassis was designed for more downforce with a lower frontal area. At 320 km/h (200 mph) it generated 5,879 lbf (26.2 kN) of downforce, about 1,000 lbf (4.4 kN) more than the C9 at the same speed. Unlike the Sauber C9, the new C11 did not have a low downforce/low drag configuration for Le Mans, that race not being a part of the championship season in 1990. The whole car was considerably slimmer in appearance than its older sibling and was both lighter and stiffer. Ballast was added to bring its minimum weight up to the required 900 kg (1,984.2 lb) with an extra 5 kilograms added for safety. Particular attention was paid to air entry and exit points around the wheel arches and the airflow through the cockpit was improved for driver comfort. The development program also included the use of a rolling road wind tunnel which was unique for Group C at the time.

A new Mercedes 5-speed transaxle was designed with the rear suspension in mind and the previous longitudinal spring/damper design of the C9 was abandoned in favour of a transverse layout, actuated by push rods. This allowed for a better integrated rear end that was much stiffer than before, according to designer Leo Ress. The front suspension remained similar to the older car with inboard transverse coil spring/damper units actuated by push rods. The brakes were Brembo and tyres were switched from Michelin to Goodyear.

The 5 litre, twin-turbo Mercedes-Benz M119 engine was retained from the older car and was sourced directly from the Mercedes engine facility at Untertürkheim. It was developed by Willi Muller and Gerd Witthalm and was returned to Stuttgart after every race, the transmission remaining at the Sauber facility at Hinwil. In race trim, it was tuned to produce around 730 hp (540 kW; 740 PS), which gave the best combination of power and efficiency for Group C, which was a fuel allocation formula. In high boost, it could go up to 2.4 Bar and make 850 hp at 7,000 RPM.

== History ==
Sauber had planned to build four C11 chassis and have enough spares for a fifth if needed. They had also changed to Goodyear tyres because of the development potential for the new Mercedes-Benz C291 which was in virtual co-development. The first C11 had its initial test run at Paul Ricard in early October 1989 but the car did not debut until the first round at Suzuka in April the following year.

Although debuting at the first round of the 1990 World Sports-Prototype Championship at Suzuka, the car did not actually race. The team had to revert to the older C9 on race day after Jean-Louis Schlesser crashed the new car in practice. However, the C11 finally made its much-anticipated debut at the second race at Monza in late April and its performance potential was immediately apparent. Mauro Baldi and Jochen Mass qualified 1–2, with Baldi almost two seconds clear of Mercedes' nearest competitors. They came home first and second. Throughout the rest of the season, the C11 won all but one race and easily took the team's championship for the year. The only black spot on an otherwise flawless performance was at Silverstone, when the leading car of Schlesser & Baldi suffered a rare engine failure. At that stage they had carved out a lead of about 50 seconds after 40 laps. The other team car of Mass and Schumacher had been disqualified for outside assistance during practice.

The only other blot on an otherwise exceptional season was the disqualification of the number 1 car in Mexico for exceeding its fuel allocation.

Although Sauber-Mercedes had triumphed at the 1989 24 Hours of Le Mans, the team choose not to defend the title in 1990 due to the race not being part of the 1990 World Sports-Prototype Championship schedule. The race reverted to being part of the championship season again in 1991.

According to Leo Ress, the C11 was easy to drive, partly because the centre of aerodynamic pressure did not shift under acceleration or braking. Mauro Baldi rated the car as one of the best he ever drove. Jaguar driver Martin Brundle recalled that the XJR-11 could just stay with the Mercedes if driven flat out but could not match it for downforce. Brundle also believed that the larger capacity engine with lighter turbocharging meant less lag and better fuel consumption, especially since the team also had good drivers. Team manager Dave Price, who had also constructed most of the chassis, felt that the Mercedes engine/turbo combination gave them much better fuel economy than anyone else, particularly while Schlesser was driving.

In all, five chassis were built, C11-03 being the most victorious chassis with four wins in the 1990 season.

Although the C11 was to be replaced by the Mercedes-Benz C291 for the 1991 World Sportscar Championship season, problems with the C291's new engine led Mercedes-Benz to continue to campaign the C11 alongside the C291. The C11 was able to gain three more class wins in the 1991 season before the C291 fully replaced it.

In classic racing the car also won Le Mans Legend twice, in 2012 and 2014.

The reason Sauber skipped from C9 to C11 is due to the difficulty of pronouncing "C10" in German.

== Specifications ==
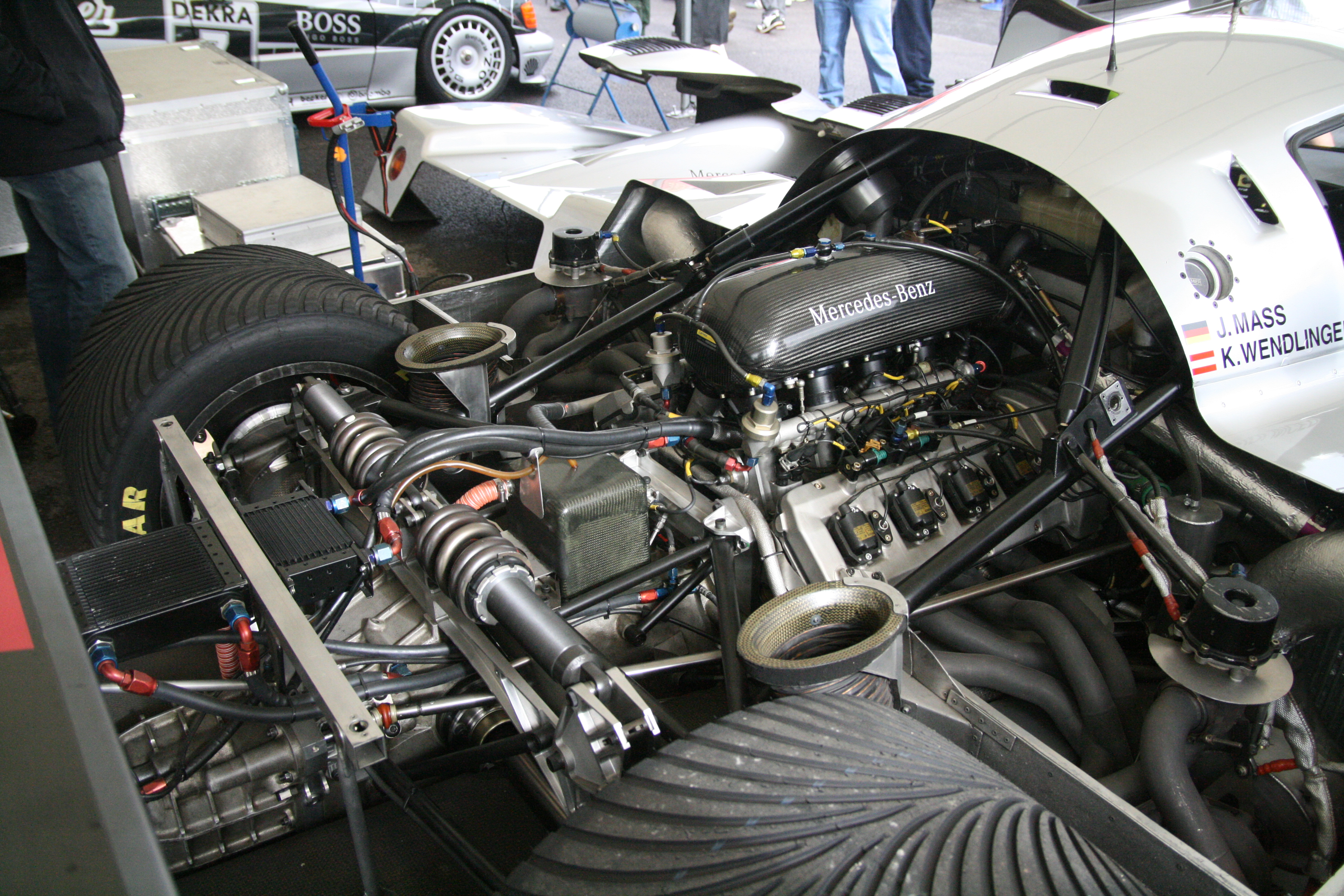
The Mercedes-Benz M119HL V8 engine

- Year: 1990
- Make: Mercedes-Benz & Sauber
- Model: C11
- Engine Location: Mid
- Drive Type: Rear Wheel
- Weight: 905 kg (1,995 lb)
- Engine Configuration: V
- Cylinders: 8
- Aspiration/Induction: Twin-turbocharged
- Displacement: 4,973 cc (303.5 cu in) (5 L).
- Horsepower: 730 hp (540 kW) at 7,000 rpm
- Torque: 820 N⋅m (600 lb⋅ft) at 3,500 rpm
- HP to Weight Ratio: 0.365 hp (0.272 kW) / lb
- HP / Liter: 146.8 bhp / Liter
- Gears: 5 speed
- Transmission: Manual

== Complete World Sportscar Championship results ==
Year	Entrant	Class	Drivers	No.	1	2	3	4	5	6	7	8	9	Points	WEMCP
1990	Team Sauber Mercedes	Group C			SUZ	MNZ	SIL	SPA	DIJ	NUR	DON	MON	MEX	67.5 ^{1}	1st ^{1}
1990	Team Sauber Mercedes	Group C	(Italy) Mauro Baldi	1		1	Ret	8	1	1	1	1	DSQ	67.5 ^{1}	1st ^{1}
1990	Team Sauber Mercedes	Group C	(France) Jean-Louis Schlesser	1		1	Ret	8	1	1	1	1	DSQ	67.5 ^{1}	1st ^{1}
1990	Team Sauber Mercedes	Group C	(Germany) Jochen Mass	2		2	DSQ	1	2	2	2	9	1	67.5 ^{1}	1st ^{1}
1990	Team Sauber Mercedes	Group C	(Austria) Karl Wendlinger	2		2		1				9		67.5 ^{1}	1st ^{1}
1990	Team Sauber Mercedes	Group C	(Germany) Michael Schumacher	2			DSQ		2	2			1	67.5 ^{1}	1st ^{1}
1990	Team Sauber Mercedes	Group C	(Germany) Heinz-Harald Frentzen	2							2			67.5 ^{1}	1st ^{1}
1991	Team Sauber Mercedes	Group C			SUZ	MNZ	SIL	LMS	NUR	MAG	MEX	AUT		70 ^{2}	3rd ^{2}
1991	Team Sauber Mercedes	Group C	(France) Jean-Louis Schlesser	1		3	4	16						70 ^{2}	3rd ^{2}
1991	Team Sauber Mercedes	Group C	(Germany) Jochen Mass	1		3	4	16						70 ^{2}	3rd ^{2}
1991	Team Sauber Mercedes	Group C	(France) Alain Ferté	1				16						70 ^{2}	3rd ^{2}
1991	Team Sauber Mercedes	Group C	(Austria) Karl Wendlinger	2	14									70 ^{2}	3rd ^{2}
1991	Team Sauber Mercedes	Group C	(Germany) Michael Schumacher	2	14									70 ^{2}	3rd ^{2}
1991	Team Sauber Mercedes	Group C	(Germany) Michael Schumacher	31				5						70 ^{2}	3rd ^{2}
1991	Team Sauber Mercedes	Group C	(Austria) Karl Wendlinger	31				5						70 ^{2}	3rd ^{2}
1991	Team Sauber Mercedes	Group C	(Germany) Fritz Kreutzpointner	31				5						70 ^{2}	3rd ^{2}
1991	Team Sauber Mercedes	Group C	(United Kingdom) Jonathan Palmer	32				20						70 ^{2}	3rd ^{2}
1991	Team Sauber Mercedes	Group C	(Sweden) Stanley Dickens	32				20						70 ^{2}	3rd ^{2}
1991	Team Sauber Mercedes	Group C	(Denmark) Kurt Thiim	32				20						70 ^{2}	3rd ^{2}

^1 Points also scored by the Sauber C9.
^2 Points also scored by the Mercedes-Benz C291.

== See also ==
- Mercedes-Benz in motorsport
