= 1989 480 km of Nürburgring =

Sports car endurance race in Germany

Nürburgring (1984–1994)

The 1989 International ADAC Trophäe was the fifth round of the 1989 World Sports Prototype Championship. It took place at the Nürburgring, West Germany on August 20, 1989.

== Official results ==
Class winners in bold. Cars failing to complete 75% of winner's distance marked as Not Classified (NC).

Pos	Class	No	Team	Drivers	Chassis	Tyre	Laps
Pos	Class	No	Team	Drivers	Engine	Tyre	Laps
1	**C1**	**61**	**(West Germany) Team Sauber Mercedes**	**(France) Jean-Louis Schlesser (West Germany) Jochen Mass**	**Sauber C9**	MI	**106**
1	**C1**	**61**	**(West Germany) Team Sauber Mercedes**	**(France) Jean-Louis Schlesser (West Germany) Jochen Mass**	**Mercedes-Benz M119 5.0L Turbo V8**	MI	**106**
2	C1	62	(West Germany) Team Sauber Mercedes	(United Kingdom) Kenny Acheson (Italy) Mauro Baldi	Sauber C9	MI	106
2	C1	62	(West Germany) Team Sauber Mercedes	(United Kingdom) Kenny Acheson (Italy) Mauro Baldi	Mercedes-Benz M119 5.0L Turbo V8	MI	106
3	C1	10	(West Germany) Porsche Kremer Racing	(South Africa) George Fouché (Italy) Giovanni Lavaggi	Porsche 962CK6	Y	104
3	C1	10	(West Germany) Porsche Kremer Racing	(South Africa) George Fouché (Italy) Giovanni Lavaggi	Porsche Type-935 3.0L Turbo Flat-6	Y	104
4	C1	6	(Switzerland) Repsol Brun Motorsport	(Switzerland) Walter Brun (Spain) Jesús Pareja	Porsche 962C	Y	104
4	C1	6	(Switzerland) Repsol Brun Motorsport	(Switzerland) Walter Brun (Spain) Jesús Pareja	Porsche Type-935 3.0L Turbo Flat-6	Y	104
5	C1	2	(United Kingdom) Silk Cut Jaguar	(Denmark) John Nielsen (United Kingdom) Andy Wallace	Jaguar XJR-11	D	104
5	C1	2	(United Kingdom) Silk Cut Jaguar	(Denmark) John Nielsen (United Kingdom) Andy Wallace	Jaguar JV6 3.5L Turbo V6	D	104
6	C1	16	(Switzerland) Repsol Brun Motorsport	(Argentina) Oscar Larrauri (Austria) Franz Konrad	Porsche 962C	Y	104
6	C1	16	(Switzerland) Repsol Brun Motorsport	(Argentina) Oscar Larrauri (Austria) Franz Konrad	Porsche Type-935 3.0L Turbo Flat-6	Y	104
7	C1	37	(Japan) Toyota Team Tom's	(United Kingdom) Johnny Dumfries (United Kingdom) Geoff Lees	Toyota 89C-V	B	104
7	C1	37	(Japan) Toyota Team Tom's	(United Kingdom) Johnny Dumfries (United Kingdom) Geoff Lees	Toyota R32V 3.2L Turbo V8	B	104
8	C1	18	(United Kingdom) Aston Martin (United Kingdom) Ecurie Ecosse	(United Kingdom) David Leslie (United Kingdom) Brian Redman	Aston Martin AMR1	G	103
8	C1	18	(United Kingdom) Aston Martin (United Kingdom) Ecurie Ecosse	(United Kingdom) David Leslie (United Kingdom) Brian Redman	Aston Martin RDP87 6.0L V8	G	103
9	C1	13	(France) Courage Compétition	(France) Pascal Fabre (Belgium) Hervé Regout	Cougar C22S	G	103
9	C1	13	(France) Courage Compétition	(France) Pascal Fabre (Belgium) Hervé Regout	Porsche Type-935 3.0L Turbo Flat-6	G	103
10	C1	1	(United Kingdom) Silk Cut Jaguar	(Netherlands) Jan Lammers (France) Patrick Tambay	Jaguar XJR-11	D	103
10	C1	1	(United Kingdom) Silk Cut Jaguar	(Netherlands) Jan Lammers (France) Patrick Tambay	Jaguar JV6 3.5L Turbo V6	D	103
11	C1	15	(United Kingdom) Richard Lloyd Racing	(Sweden) Steven Andskär (Belgium) Bertrand Gachot	Porsche 962C GTi	G	102
11	C1	15	(United Kingdom) Richard Lloyd Racing	(Sweden) Steven Andskär (Belgium) Bertrand Gachot	Porsche Type-935 3.0L Turbo Flat-6	G	102
12	C1	5	(Switzerland) Repsol Brun Motorsport	(Norway) Harald Huysman (West Germany) Uwe Schäfer	Porsche 962C	Y	102
12	C1	5	(Switzerland) Repsol Brun Motorsport	(Norway) Harald Huysman (West Germany) Uwe Schäfer	Porsche Type-935 3.0L Turbo Flat-6	Y	102
13	**GTP**	**201**	**(Japan) Mazdaspeed**	**(Belgium) Pierre Dieudonné (Republic of Ireland) David Kennedy**	**Mazda 767B**	D	**101**
13	**GTP**	**201**	**(Japan) Mazdaspeed**	**(Belgium) Pierre Dieudonné (Republic of Ireland) David Kennedy**	**Mazda 13J 2.6L 4-Rotor**	D	**101**
14	C1	34	(France) Porsche Alméras Montpellier	(France) Jacques Alméras (France) Jean-Marie Alméras	Porsche 962C	G	101
14	C1	34	(France) Porsche Alméras Montpellier	(France) Jacques Alméras (France) Jean-Marie Alméras	Porsche Type-935 3.0L Turbo Flat-6	G	101
15	C1	14	(United Kingdom) Richard Lloyd Racing	(United Kingdom) Tiff Needell (United Kingdom) Derek Bell	Porsche 962C GTi	G	100
15	C1	14	(United Kingdom) Richard Lloyd Racing	(United Kingdom) Tiff Needell (United Kingdom) Derek Bell	Porsche Type-935 3.0L Turbo Flat-6	G	100
16	C1	72	(West Germany) Obermaier Primagaz	(West Germany) Jürgen Lässig (France) Pierre Yver	Porsche 962C	G	100
16	C1	72	(West Germany) Obermaier Primagaz	(West Germany) Jürgen Lässig (France) Pierre Yver	Porsche Type-935 3.0L Turbo Flat-6	G	100
17	**C2**	**171**	**(United Kingdom) Team Mako**	**(United Kingdom) James Shead (Canada) Robbie Stirling**	**Spice SE88C**	G	**99**
17	**C2**	**171**	**(United Kingdom) Team Mako**	**(United Kingdom) James Shead (Canada) Robbie Stirling**	**Ford Cosworth DFL 3.3L V8**	G	**99**
18	C2	111	(United Kingdom) PC Automotive	(United Kingdom) Richard Piper (United States) Olindo Iacobelli	Spice SE88C	G	99
18	C2	111	(United Kingdom) PC Automotive	(United Kingdom) Richard Piper (United States) Olindo Iacobelli	Ford Cosworth DFL 3.3L V8	G	99
19	C2	103	France Prototeam	(France) Claude Ballot-Léna (Switzerland) Bernard Thuner	Spice SE88C	G	98
19	C2	103	France Prototeam	(France) Claude Ballot-Léna (Switzerland) Bernard Thuner	Ford Cosworth DFL 3.3L V8	G	98
20	C1	8	(West Germany) Joest Racing	(France) Henri Pescarolo (France) Jean-Louis Ricci	Porsche 962C	G	94
20	C1	8	(West Germany) Joest Racing	(France) Henri Pescarolo (France) Jean-Louis Ricci	Porsche Type-935 3.0L Turbo Flat-6	G	94
21	C2	102	(United Kingdom) Chamberlain Engineering	(Italy) Luigi Taverna (United Kingdom) John Williams	Spice SE86C	G	83
21	C2	102	(United Kingdom) Chamberlain Engineering	(Italy) Luigi Taverna (United Kingdom) John Williams	Hart 418T 1.8L Turbo I4	G	83
22 NC	C1	29	(Italy) Mussato Action Car	(Italy) Bruno Giacomelli (Italy) Massimo Monti	Lancia LC2	D	55
22 NC	C1	29	(Italy) Mussato Action Car	(Italy) Bruno Giacomelli (Italy) Massimo Monti	Ferrari 308C 3.0L Turbo V8	D	55
23 DNF	C1	7	(West Germany) Joest Racing	(West Germany) Frank Jelinski (France) Bob Wollek	Porsche 962C	G	105
23 DNF	C1	7	(West Germany) Joest Racing	(West Germany) Frank Jelinski (France) Bob Wollek	Porsche Type-935 3.0L Turbo Flat-6	G	105
24 DNF	C1	23	(Japan) Nissan Motorsports International	(United Kingdom) Andrew Gilbert-Scott (United Kingdom) Julian Bailey	Nissan R89C	D	103
24 DNF	C1	23	(Japan) Nissan Motorsports International	(United Kingdom) Andrew Gilbert-Scott (United Kingdom) Julian Bailey	Nissan VRH35Z 3.5L Turbo V8	D	103
25 DNF	C2	108	(United Kingdom) Roy Baker Racing (United Kingdom) GP Motorsport	(France) Philippe de Henning (United Kingdom) Dudley Wood	Spice SE87C	G	94
25 DNF	C2	108	(United Kingdom) Roy Baker Racing (United Kingdom) GP Motorsport	(France) Philippe de Henning (United Kingdom) Dudley Wood	Ford Cosworth DFL 3.3L V8	G	94
26 DNF	C1	21	(United Kingdom) Spice Engineering	(Chile) Eliseo Salazar (United Kingdom) Tim Harvey	Spice SE89C	G	76
26 DNF	C1	21	(United Kingdom) Spice Engineering	(Chile) Eliseo Salazar (United Kingdom) Tim Harvey	Ford Cosworth DFZ 3.5L V8	G	76
27 DNF	C1	17	(West Germany) Dauer Racing	(West Germany) Jochen Dauer (United Kingdom) Will Hoy	Porsche 962C	G	74
27 DNF	C1	17	(West Germany) Dauer Racing	(West Germany) Jochen Dauer (United Kingdom) Will Hoy	Porsche Type-935 3.0L Turbo Flat-6	G	74
28 DNF	C1	40	(Switzerland) Swiss Team Salamin	(Switzerland) Antoine Salamin (Morocco) Max Cohen-Olivar	Porsche 962C	G	67
28 DNF	C1	40	(Switzerland) Swiss Team Salamin	(Switzerland) Antoine Salamin (Morocco) Max Cohen-Olivar	Porsche Type-935 3.0L Turbo Flat-6	G	67
29 DNF	C2	101	(United Kingdom) Chamberlain Engineering	(Spain) Fermín Velez (United Kingdom) Nick Adams	Spice SE89C	G	55
29 DNF	C2	101	(United Kingdom) Chamberlain Engineering	(Spain) Fermín Velez (United Kingdom) Nick Adams	Ford Cosworth DFL 3.3L V8	G	55
30 DNF	C2	107	(United Kingdom) Tiga Racing Team	(United States) Stephen Hynes (United Kingdom) John Sheldon	Tiga GC289	G	48
30 DNF	C2	107	(United Kingdom) Tiga Racing Team	(United States) Stephen Hynes (United Kingdom) John Sheldon	Ford Cosworth DFL 3.3L V8	G	48
31 DNF	C2	178	(France) Didier Bonnet	(France) Jean-Claude Justice (France) Gérard Tremblay	Tiga GC289	G	35
31 DNF	C2	178	(France) Didier Bonnet	(France) Jean-Claude Justice (France) Gérard Tremblay	Ford Cosworth DFL 3.3L V8	G	35
32 DNF	C1	20	(United Kingdom) Team Davey	(United Kingdom) Tim Lee-Davey (West Germany) Hans-Jürgen Dahmen	Porsche 962C	D	29
32 DNF	C1	20	(United Kingdom) Team Davey	(United Kingdom) Tim Lee-Davey (West Germany) Hans-Jürgen Dahmen	Porsche Type-935 3.0L Turbo Flat-6	D	29
33 DNF	C2	106	(Italy) Porto Kaleo Team	(Italy) Ranieri Randaccio (Italy) Pasquale Barberio	Tiga GC288/9	G	28
33 DNF	C2	106	(Italy) Porto Kaleo Team	(Italy) Ranieri Randaccio (Italy) Pasquale Barberio	Ford Cosworth 3.3L V8	G	28
34 DNF	C1	22	(United Kingdom) Spice Engineering	(South Africa) Wayne Taylor (Denmark) Thorkild Thyrring	Spice SE89C	G	24
34 DNF	C1	22	(United Kingdom) Spice Engineering	(South Africa) Wayne Taylor (Denmark) Thorkild Thyrring	Ford Cosworth DFZ 3.5L V8	G	24
35 DNF	C2	151	(Switzerland) Pierre-Alain Lombardi	(Switzerland) Pierre-Alain Lombardi (France) Bruno Sotty	Spice SE86C	G	24
35 DNF	C2	151	(Switzerland) Pierre-Alain Lombardi	(Switzerland) Pierre-Alain Lombardi (France) Bruno Sotty	Ford Cosworth DFL 3.3L V8	G	24
36 DNF	C2	177	(France) Automobiles Louis Descartes	(France) Louis Descartes (France) Alain Serpaggi	ALD C289	G	1
36 DNF	C2	177	(France) Automobiles Louis Descartes	(France) Louis Descartes (France) Alain Serpaggi	Ford Cosworth 3.3L V8	G	1

== Statistics ==
- Pole position - #62 Team Sauber Mercedes - 1:23.125
- Fastest lap - #61 Team Sauber Mercedes - 1:29.281
- Average speed - 172.725 km/h

World Sportscar Championship
Previous race: 1989 480 km of Brands Hatch	1989 season	Next race: 1989 480 km of Donington
