= 1989 World Sportscar Championship =

Racing tournament

Seasons
- ← 1988 1990 →

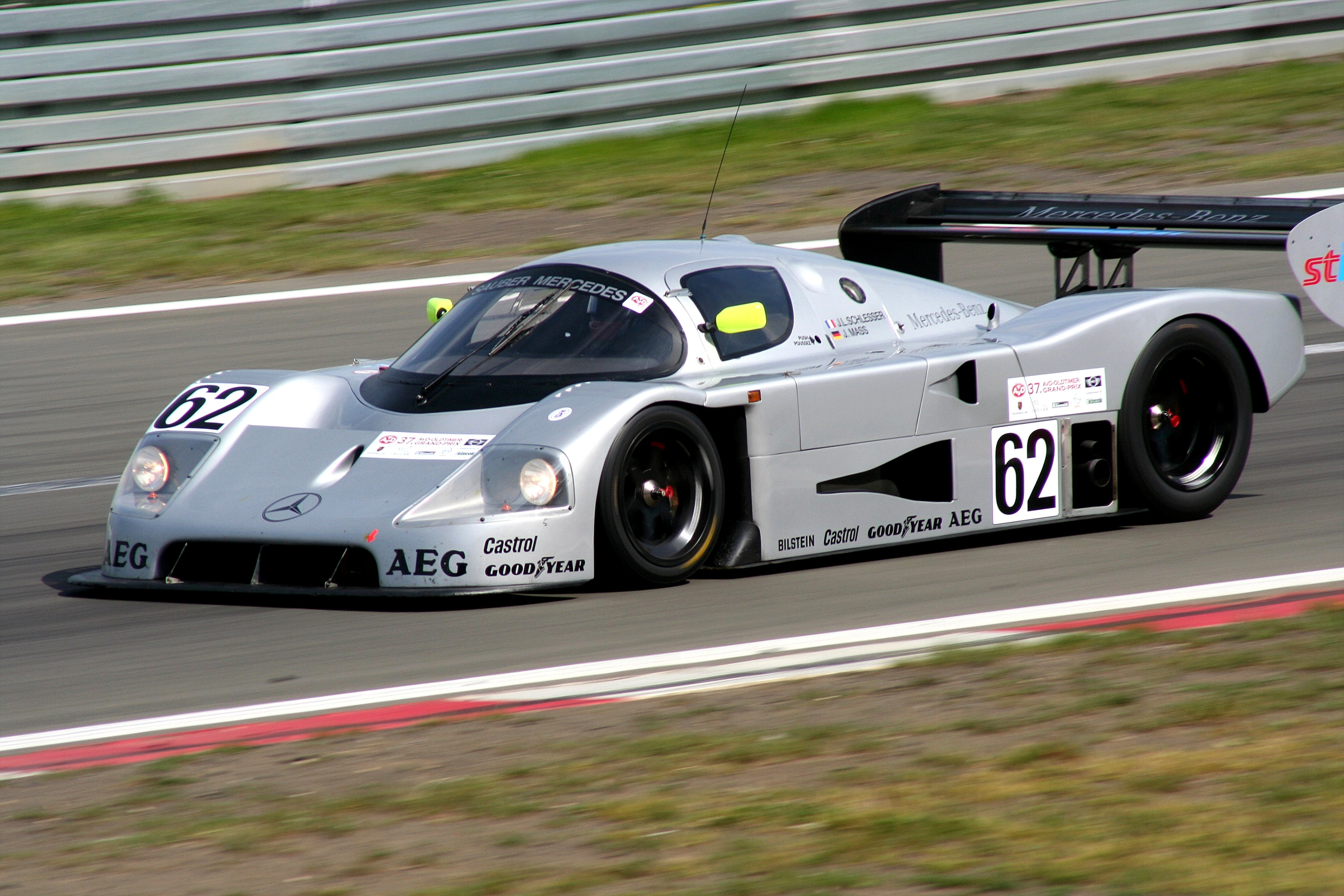
Sauber Mercedes won the 1989 World Sports Prototype Championship for Teams with the Sauber C9 Mercedes, as seen here at the Nürburgring in August 2009

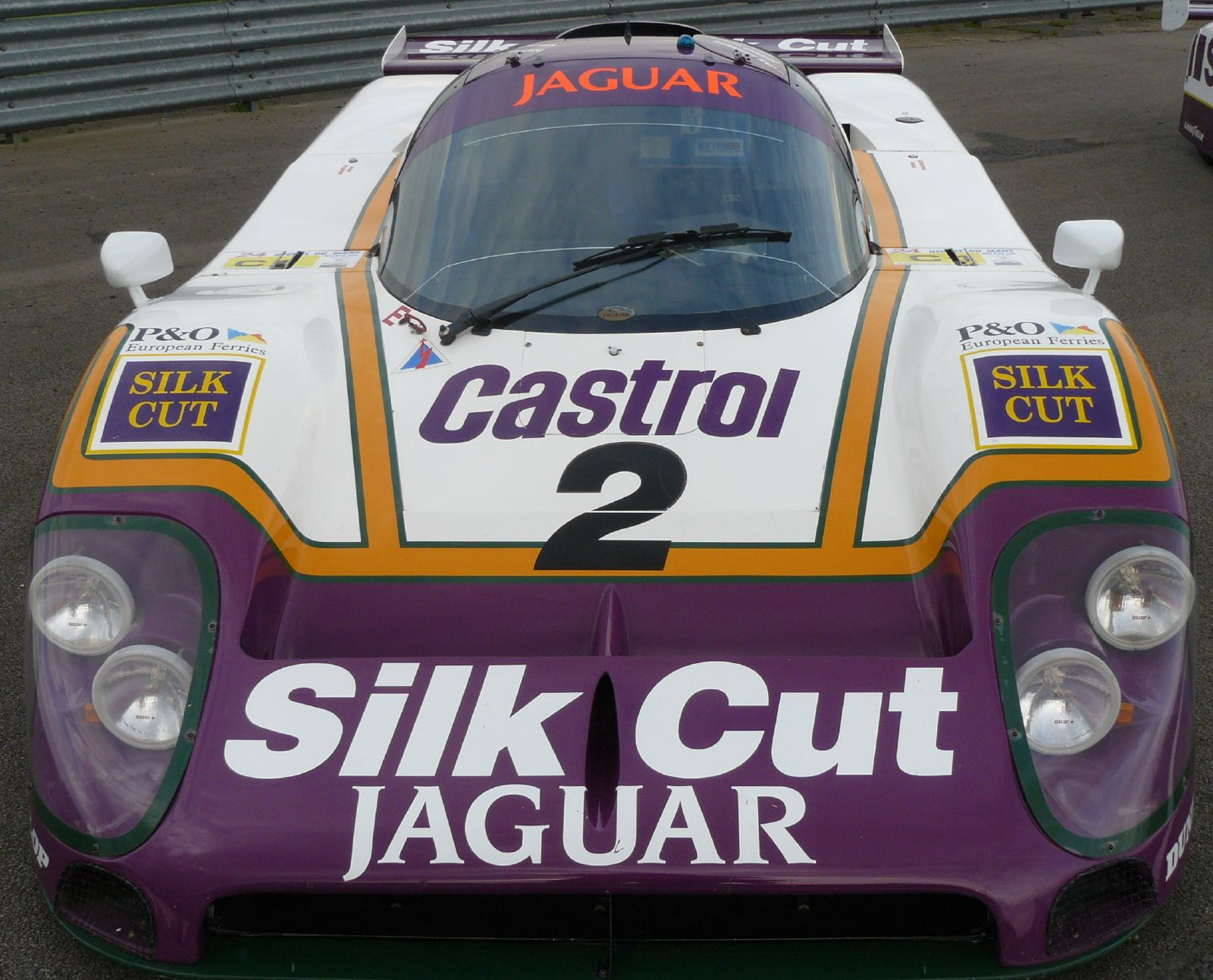
Silk Cut Jaguar placed 4th in the Teams Championship with the Jaguar XJR9 (above) & XJR11

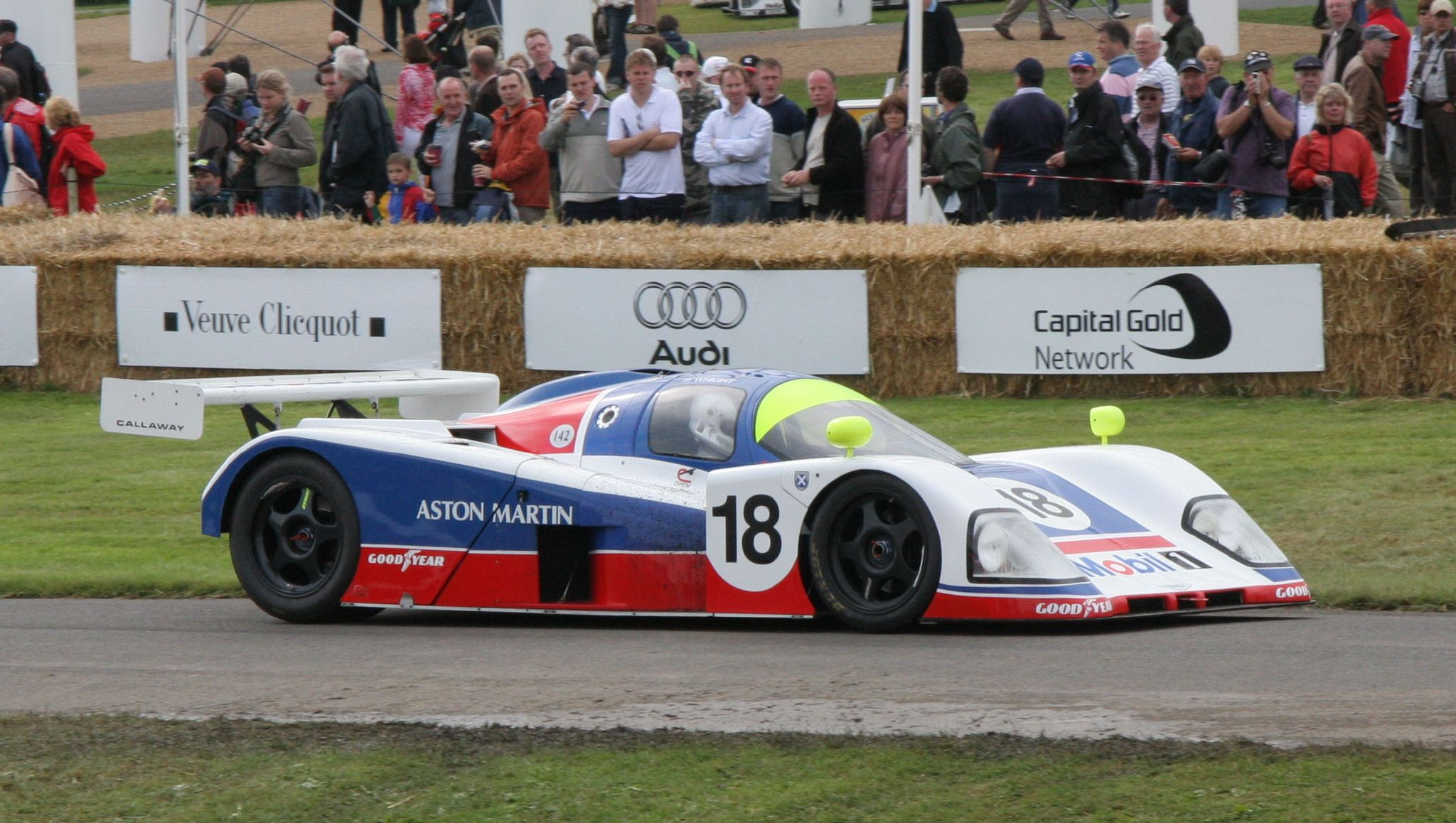
Aston Martin placed 6th in the Teams Championship with the Aston Martin AMR1

The 1989 World Sportscar Championship season was the 37th season of FIA World Sportscar Championship motor racing. It featured the 1989 FIA World Sports Prototype Championship, which was open to Group C1 Sports Prototypes, Group C2 Sports Prototypes and IMSA GTP cars. The championship was contested over an eight round series which ran from 9 April to 29 October 1989.

== Schedule ==
Rnd	Race	Circuit	Date
1	(Japan) WSPC Suzuka (480 km)	Suzuka Circuit	9 April
2	(France) Coupe de Dijon (480 km)	Dijon-Prenois	21 May
3	(Spain) Trofeo Repsol (480 km)	Circuito Permanente Del Jarama	25 June
4	(United Kingdom) Brands Hatch Trophy (480 km)	Brands Hatch	23 July
5	(Germany) ADAC Trophy (480km)	Nürburgring	20 August
6	(United Kingdom) Wheatcroft Gold Cup (480 km)	Donington Park	3 September
7	(Belgium) Coupes de Spa (480km)	Circuit de Spa-Francorchamps	17 September
8	(Mexico) Trofeo Hermanos Rodriguez (480 km)	Autodromo Hermanos Rodriguez	29 October

== Entries ==
=== Group C1 ===
Entrant	Car	Engine	Tyre	No.	Drivers	Rounds
(United Kingdom) Silk Cut Jaguar	Jaguar XJR-9; Jaguar XJR-11	Jaguar 7.0 L V12; Jaguar JV6 3.0 L Turbo V6	D	1	(Netherlands) Jan Lammers	All
(United Kingdom) Silk Cut Jaguar	Jaguar XJR-9; Jaguar XJR-11	Jaguar 7.0 L V12; Jaguar JV6 3.0 L Turbo V6	D	1	(France) Patrick Tambay	All
(United Kingdom) Silk Cut Jaguar	Jaguar XJR-9; Jaguar XJR-11	Jaguar 7.0 L V12; Jaguar JV6 3.0 L Turbo V6	D	2	(United Kingdom) Andy Wallace	All
(United Kingdom) Silk Cut Jaguar	Jaguar XJR-9; Jaguar XJR-11	Jaguar 7.0 L V12; Jaguar JV6 3.0 L Turbo V6	D	2	(Denmark) John Nielsen	1–5, 7
(United Kingdom) Silk Cut Jaguar	Jaguar XJR-9; Jaguar XJR-11	Jaguar 7.0 L V12; Jaguar JV6 3.0 L Turbo V6	D	2	(France) Alain Ferté	6, 8
(United Kingdom) Silk Cut Jaguar	Jaguar XJR-9; Jaguar XJR-11	Jaguar 7.0 L V12; Jaguar JV6 3.0 L Turbo V6	D	3	(United States) Davy Jones	4
(United Kingdom) Silk Cut Jaguar	Jaguar XJR-9; Jaguar XJR-11	Jaguar 7.0 L V12; Jaguar JV6 3.0 L Turbo V6	D	3	(France) Alain Ferté	4
(Switzerland) Repsol Brun Motorsport	Porsche 962C	Porsche Type-935/82 3.0 L Turbo Flat-6	Y	5	(Belgium) Harald Huysman	All
(Switzerland) Repsol Brun Motorsport	Porsche 962C	Porsche Type-935/82 3.0 L Turbo Flat-6	Y	5	(Finland) Juha Varjosaari	1
(Switzerland) Repsol Brun Motorsport	Porsche 962C	Porsche Type-935/82 3.0 L Turbo Flat-6	Y	5	(West Germany) Uwe Schäfer	2, 5, 7
(Switzerland) Repsol Brun Motorsport	Porsche 962C	Porsche Type-935/82 3.0 L Turbo Flat-6	Y	5	(Argentina) Oscar Larrauri	2, 6, 8
(Switzerland) Repsol Brun Motorsport	Porsche 962C	Porsche Type-935/82 3.0 L Turbo Flat-6	Y	5	(Sweden) Stanley Dickens	3
(Switzerland) Repsol Brun Motorsport	Porsche 962C	Porsche Type-935/82 3.0 L Turbo Flat-6	Y	5	(Austria) Franz Konrad	4
(Switzerland) Repsol Brun Motorsport	Porsche 962C	Porsche Type-935/82 3.0 L Turbo Flat-6	Y	6	(Spain) Jésus Pareja	All
(Switzerland) Repsol Brun Motorsport	Porsche 962C	Porsche Type-935/82 3.0 L Turbo Flat-6	Y	6	(Switzerland) Walter Brun	1–2, 4–8
(Switzerland) Repsol Brun Motorsport	Porsche 962C	Porsche Type-935/82 3.0 L Turbo Flat-6	Y	6	(Argentina) Oscar Larrauri	3
(Switzerland) Repsol Brun Motorsport	Porsche 962C	Porsche Type-935/82 3.0 L Turbo Flat-6	Y	16	(Argentina) Oscar Larrauri	1–2, 5, 7
(Switzerland) Repsol Brun Motorsport	Porsche 962C	Porsche Type-935/82 3.0 L Turbo Flat-6	Y	16	(Brazil) Maurizio Sandro Sala	1
(Switzerland) Repsol Brun Motorsport	Porsche 962C	Porsche Type-935/82 3.0 L Turbo Flat-6	Y	16	(Sweden) Stanley Dickens	2, 6
(Switzerland) Repsol Brun Motorsport	Porsche 962C	Porsche Type-935/82 3.0 L Turbo Flat-6	Y	16	(West Germany) Uwe Schäfer	4, 6
(Switzerland) Repsol Brun Motorsport	Porsche 962C	Porsche Type-935/82 3.0 L Turbo Flat-6	Y	16	(Austria) Walter Lechner	4
(Switzerland) Repsol Brun Motorsport	Porsche 962C	Porsche Type-935/82 3.0 L Turbo Flat-6	Y	16	(Austria) Franz Konrad	5
(Switzerland) Repsol Brun Motorsport	Porsche 962C	Porsche Type-935/82 3.0 L Turbo Flat-6	Y	16	(Austria) Roland Ratzenberger	7–8
(Switzerland) Repsol Brun Motorsport	Porsche 962C	Porsche Type-935/82 3.0 L Turbo Flat-6	Y	16	(Italy) Massimo Sigala	8
(West Germany) Joest Racing	Porsche 962C	Porsche Type-935/82 3.0 L Turbo Flat-6	G	7	(France) Bob Wollek	1–2, 4–8
(West Germany) Joest Racing	Porsche 962C	Porsche Type-935/82 3.0 L Turbo Flat-6	G	7	(West Germany) Frank Jelinski	1–2, 4–8
(West Germany) Joest Racing	Porsche 962C	Porsche Type-935/82 3.0 L Turbo Flat-6	G	8	(France) Jean-Louis Ricci	1–2, 4–8
(West Germany) Joest Racing	Porsche 962C	Porsche Type-935/82 3.0 L Turbo Flat-6	G	8	(France) Claude Ballot-Léna	1–2
(West Germany) Joest Racing	Porsche 962C	Porsche Type-935/82 3.0 L Turbo Flat-6	G	8	(France) Henri Pescarolo	4–8
(West Germany) Joest Racing	Porsche 962C	Porsche Type-935/82 3.0 L Turbo Flat-6	G	8	(Germany) Frank Jelinski	8
(West Germany) Porsche Kremer Racing	Porsche 962CK6	Porsche Type-935/82 3.0 L Turbo Flat-6	Y	10	(Italy) Bruno Giacomelli	1–2
(West Germany) Porsche Kremer Racing	Porsche 962CK6	Porsche Type-935/82 3.0 L Turbo Flat-6	Y	10	(Italy) Giovanni Lavaggi	1, 3, 5–7
(West Germany) Porsche Kremer Racing	Porsche 962CK6	Porsche Type-935/82 3.0 L Turbo Flat-6	Y	10	(South Africa) George Fouché	2–3, 5–7
(West Germany) Porsche Kremer Racing	Porsche 962CK6	Porsche Type-935/82 3.0 L Turbo Flat-6	Y	10	(West Germany) Manuel Reuter	8
(West Germany) Porsche Kremer Racing	Porsche 962CK6	Porsche Type-935/82 3.0 L Turbo Flat-6	Y	10	(Austria) Franz Konrad	8
(West Germany) Porsche Kremer Racing	Porsche 962CK6	Porsche Type-935/82 3.0 L Turbo Flat-6	B	11	(Japan) Masanori Sekiya	1
(West Germany) Porsche Kremer Racing	Porsche 962CK6	Porsche Type-935/82 3.0 L Turbo Flat-6	B	11	(Japan) Hideki Okada	1
(France) Courage Compétition	Cougar C22S	Porsche Type-935/82 3.0 L Turbo Flat-6	G	13	(France) Pascal Fabre	All
(France) Courage Compétition	Cougar C22S	Porsche Type-935/82 3.0 L Turbo Flat-6	G	13	(Italy) Alessandro Santin	1
(France) Courage Compétition	Cougar C22S	Porsche Type-935/82 3.0 L Turbo Flat-6	G	13	(France) Jean-Louis Bousquet	2
(France) Courage Compétition	Cougar C22S	Porsche Type-935/82 3.0 L Turbo Flat-6	G	13	(Belgium) Bernard de Dryver	3
(France) Courage Compétition	Cougar C22S	Porsche Type-935/82 3.0 L Turbo Flat-6	G	13	(Belgium) Hervé Regout	4–7
(France) Courage Compétition	Cougar C22S	Porsche Type-935/82 3.0 L Turbo Flat-6	G	13	(Mexico) Oscar Manautou	8
(United Kingdom) Richard Lloyd Racing	Porsche 962C GTi	Porsche Type-935/82 3.0 L Turbo Flat-6	G	14	(United Kingdom) Tiff Needell	1–2, 4–8
(United Kingdom) Richard Lloyd Racing	Porsche 962C GTi	Porsche Type-935/82 3.0 L Turbo Flat-6	G	14	(United Kingdom) Derek Bell	1–2, 4–6, 8
(United Kingdom) Richard Lloyd Racing	Porsche 962C GTi	Porsche Type-935/82 3.0 L Turbo Flat-6	G	14	(Sweden) Steven Andskär	7
(United Kingdom) Richard Lloyd Racing	Porsche 962C GTi	Porsche Type-935/82 3.0 L Turbo Flat-6	G	15	(United Kingdom) James Weaver	4
(United Kingdom) Richard Lloyd Racing	Porsche 962C GTi	Porsche Type-935/82 3.0 L Turbo Flat-6	G	15	(United Kingdom) David Hunt	4
(United Kingdom) Richard Lloyd Racing	Porsche 962C GTi	Porsche Type-935/82 3.0 L Turbo Flat-6	G	15	(Sweden) Steven Andskär	5
(United Kingdom) Richard Lloyd Racing	Porsche 962C GTi	Porsche Type-935/82 3.0 L Turbo Flat-6	G	15	(Belgium) Bertrand Gachot	5
(United Kingdom) Richard Lloyd Racing	Porsche 962C GTi	Porsche Type-935/82 3.0 L Turbo Flat-6	D	100	(Sweden) Steven Andskär	1
(United Kingdom) Richard Lloyd Racing	Porsche 962C GTi	Porsche Type-935/82 3.0 L Turbo Flat-6	D	100	(South Africa) George Fouché	1
(West Germany) Dauer Racing	Porsche 962C	Porsche Type-935/82 3.0 L Turbo Flat-6	Y	17	(West Germany) Jochen Dauer	1–2, 4–8
(West Germany) Dauer Racing	Porsche 962C	Porsche Type-935/82 3.0 L Turbo Flat-6	Y	17	(Austria) Franz Konrad	1–2
(West Germany) Dauer Racing	Porsche 962C	Porsche Type-935/82 3.0 L Turbo Flat-6	Y	17	(United Kingdom) Will Hoy	4–6
(West Germany) Dauer Racing	Porsche 962C	Porsche Type-935/82 3.0 L Turbo Flat-6	Y	17	(Mexico) Juan Carlos Bolanos	8
(United Kingdom) Aston Martin	Aston Martin AMR1	Aston Martin RDP87 6.0 L V8	G	18	(United Kingdom) Brian Redman	2, 4–8
(United Kingdom) Aston Martin	Aston Martin AMR1	Aston Martin RDP87 6.0 L V8	G	18	(United Kingdom) David Leslie	2, 4–5, 8
(United Kingdom) Aston Martin	Aston Martin AMR1	Aston Martin RDP87 6.0 L V8	G	18	(United Kingdom) David Sears	6
(United Kingdom) Aston Martin	Aston Martin AMR1	Aston Martin RDP87 6.0 L V8	G	18	(Sweden) Stanley Dickens	7
(United Kingdom) Aston Martin	Aston Martin AMR1	Aston Martin RDP87 6.0 L V8	G	19	(United Kingdom) David Leslie	6–7
(United Kingdom) Aston Martin	Aston Martin AMR1	Aston Martin RDP87 6.0 L V8	G	19	(Republic of Ireland) Michael Roe	6–7
(United Kingdom) Team Davey	Porsche 962C	Porsche Type-935/82 3.0 L Turbo Flat-6	D G	20	(United Kingdom) Tim Lee-Davey	1–5, 7
(United Kingdom) Team Davey	Porsche 962C	Porsche Type-935/82 3.0 L Turbo Flat-6	D G	20	(West Germany) Jürgen Barth	1
(United Kingdom) Team Davey	Porsche 962C	Porsche Type-935/82 3.0 L Turbo Flat-6	D G	20	(West Germany) Peter Oberndorfer	2
(United Kingdom) Team Davey	Porsche 962C	Porsche Type-935/82 3.0 L Turbo Flat-6	D G	20	(Morocco) Max Cohen-Olivar	3
(United Kingdom) Team Davey	Porsche 962C	Porsche Type-935/82 3.0 L Turbo Flat-6	D G	20	(South Africa) Desiré Wilson	4
(United Kingdom) Team Davey	Porsche 962C	Porsche Type-935/82 3.0 L Turbo Flat-6	D G	20	(West Germany) Heinz-Jörgen Dahmen	5
(United Kingdom) Team Davey	Porsche 962C	Porsche Type-935/82 3.0 L Turbo Flat-6	D G	20	(Australia) Vern Schuppan	7
(United Kingdom) Team Davey	Porsche 962C	Porsche Type-935/82 3.0 L Turbo Flat-6	D G	20	(Mexico) Alfonso Toledano	8
(United Kingdom) Team Davey	Porsche 962C	Porsche Type-935/82 3.0 L Turbo Flat-6	D G	55	(Australia) Vern Schuppan	1
(United Kingdom) Team Davey	Porsche 962C	Porsche Type-935/82 3.0 L Turbo Flat-6	D G	55	(Sweden) Eje Elgh	1
(United Kingdom) Spice Engineering	Spice SE89C	Ford Cosworth DFZ 3.5 L V8	G	21	(United Kingdom) Ray Bellm	1–4, 7–8
(United Kingdom) Spice Engineering	Spice SE89C	Ford Cosworth DFZ 3.5 L V8	G	21	(Chile) Eliseo Salazar	1, 3–7
(United Kingdom) Spice Engineering	Spice SE89C	Ford Cosworth DFZ 3.5 L V8	G	21	(Denmark) Thorkild Thyrring	1
(United Kingdom) Spice Engineering	Spice SE89C	Ford Cosworth DFZ 3.5 L V8	G	21	(Greece) Costas Los	2
(United Kingdom) Spice Engineering	Spice SE89C	Ford Cosworth DFZ 3.5 L V8	G	21	(United Kingdom) Tim Harvey	5–6
(United Kingdom) Spice Engineering	Spice SE89C	Ford Cosworth DFZ 3.5 L V8	G	21	(Mexico) Bernard Jourdain	8
(United Kingdom) Spice Engineering	Spice SE89C	Ford Cosworth DFZ 3.5 L V8	G	22	(Denmark) Thorkild Thyrring	All
(United Kingdom) Spice Engineering	Spice SE89C	Ford Cosworth DFZ 3.5 L V8	G	22	(South Africa) Wayne Taylor	All
(United Kingdom) Spice Engineering	Spice SE89C	Ford Cosworth DFZ 3.5 L V8	G	22	(Chile) Eliseo Salazar	8
(Japan) Nissan Motorsports International	Nissan R88C; Nissan R89C	Nissan VRH30 3.0 L Turbo V8; Nissan VRH35Z 3.5 L Turbo V8	B D	23	(Japan) Kazuyoshi Hoshino	1
(Japan) Nissan Motorsports International	Nissan R88C; Nissan R89C	Nissan VRH30 3.0 L Turbo V8; Nissan VRH35Z 3.5 L Turbo V8	B D	23	(Japan) Toshio Suzuki	1
(Japan) Nissan Motorsports International	Nissan R88C; Nissan R89C	Nissan VRH30 3.0 L Turbo V8; Nissan VRH35Z 3.5 L Turbo V8	B D	23	(United Kingdom) Julian Bailey	2–8
(Japan) Nissan Motorsports International	Nissan R88C; Nissan R89C	Nissan VRH30 3.0 L Turbo V8; Nissan VRH35Z 3.5 L Turbo V8	B D	23	(United Kingdom) Mark Blundell	2–3, 6–8
(Japan) Nissan Motorsports International	Nissan R88C; Nissan R89C	Nissan VRH30 3.0 L Turbo V8; Nissan VRH35Z 3.5 L Turbo V8	B D	23	(United Kingdom) Andrew Gilbert-Scott	4–5, 7
(Japan) Nissan Motorsports International	Nissan R88C; Nissan R89C	Nissan VRH30 3.0 L Turbo V8; Nissan VRH35Z 3.5 L Turbo V8	B D	24	(Japan) Masahiro Hasemi	1
(Japan) Nissan Motorsports International	Nissan R88C; Nissan R89C	Nissan VRH30 3.0 L Turbo V8; Nissan VRH35Z 3.5 L Turbo V8	B D	24	(Sweden) Anders Olofsson	1
(Japan) Nissan Motorsports International	March 88S	Nissan VG30 3.2 L Turbo V6	Y	85	(Japan) Takao Wada	1
(Japan) Nissan Motorsports International	March 88S	Nissan VG30 3.2 L Turbo V6	Y	85	(Japan) Akio Morimoto	1
France Prototeam	Spice SE88C	Ford Cosworth DFZ 3.5 L V8	G	26	(France) Alain Ferté	1–2
France Prototeam	Spice SE88C	Ford Cosworth DFZ 3.5 L V8	G	26	(France) Henri Pescarolo	1–2
France Prototeam	Spice SE88C	Ford Cosworth DFZ 3.5 L V8	G	26	(France) Claude Ballot-Léna	4, 6
France Prototeam	Spice SE88C	Ford Cosworth DFZ 3.5 L V8	G	26	(Greece) Costas Los	4
France Prototeam	Spice SE88C	Ford Cosworth DFZ 3.5 L V8	G	26	(Switzerland) Bernard Thuner	6
(Italy) Mussato Action Car	Lancia LC2/89	Ferrari 308C 3.0 L Turbo V8	D	29	(Italy) Franco Scapini	1–2, 6–8
(Italy) Mussato Action Car	Lancia LC2/89	Ferrari 308C 3.0 L Turbo V8	D	29	(Italy) Gianfranco Tacchino	1
(Italy) Mussato Action Car	Lancia LC2/89	Ferrari 308C 3.0 L Turbo V8	D	29	(Italy) Andrea de Cesaris	2
(Italy) Mussato Action Car	Lancia LC2/89	Ferrari 308C 3.0 L Turbo V8	D	29	(Italy) Bruno Giacomelli	4–8
(Italy) Mussato Action Car	Lancia LC2/89	Ferrari 308C 3.0 L Turbo V8	D	29	(Italy) Massimo Monti	4–5
(Italy) Mussato Action Car	Lancia LC2/89	Ferrari 308C 3.0 L Turbo V8	D	29	(Mexico) Enrique Contreras	8
(France) Porsche Alméras Montpellier	Porsche 962C	Porsche Type-935/82 3.0 L Turbo Flat-6	Y G	34	(Japan) Kunimitsu Takahashi	1
(France) Porsche Alméras Montpellier	Porsche 962C	Porsche Type-935/82 3.0 L Turbo Flat-6	Y G	34	(Sweden) Stanley Dickens	1
(France) Porsche Alméras Montpellier	Porsche 962C	Porsche Type-935/82 3.0 L Turbo Flat-6	Y G	34	(France) Jacques Alméras	2–5, 7–8
(France) Porsche Alméras Montpellier	Porsche 962C	Porsche Type-935/82 3.0 L Turbo Flat-6	Y G	34	(France) Jean-Marie Alméras	2–5, 7–8
(Japan) Toyota Team Tom's	Toyota 88C; Toyota 89C-V	Toyota 3S-GTM 2.1 L Turbo I4; Toyota R32V 3.2 L Turbo V8	B	36	(Italy) Paolo Barilla	1
(Japan) Toyota Team Tom's	Toyota 88C; Toyota 89C-V	Toyota 3S-GTM 2.1 L Turbo I4; Toyota R32V 3.2 L Turbo V8	B	36	(Japan) Hitoshi Ogawa	1
(Japan) Toyota Team Tom's	Toyota 88C; Toyota 89C-V	Toyota 3S-GTM 2.1 L Turbo I4; Toyota R32V 3.2 L Turbo V8	B	37	(United Kingdom) Johnny Dumfries	All
(Japan) Toyota Team Tom's	Toyota 88C; Toyota 89C-V	Toyota 3S-GTM 2.1 L Turbo I4; Toyota R32V 3.2 L Turbo V8	B	37	(United Kingdom) Geoff Lees	1–3, 5, 7
(Japan) Toyota Team Tom's	Toyota 88C; Toyota 89C-V	Toyota 3S-GTM 2.1 L Turbo I4; Toyota R32V 3.2 L Turbo V8	B	37	(United Kingdom) John Watson	4, 6, 8
(Japan) Toyota Team Tom's	Toyota 88C; Toyota 89C-V	Toyota 3S-GTM 2.1 L Turbo I4; Toyota R32V 3.2 L Turbo V8	D	50	(Austria) Roland Ratzenberger	1
(Japan) Toyota Team Tom's	Toyota 88C; Toyota 89C-V	Toyota 3S-GTM 2.1 L Turbo I4; Toyota R32V 3.2 L Turbo V8	D	50	(Japan) Keiichi Suzuki	1
(Switzerland) Swiss Team Salamin	Porsche 962C	Porsche Type-935/82 3.0 L Turbo Flat-6	Y G	40	(Japan) Kenji Takahashi	1
(Switzerland) Swiss Team Salamin	Porsche 962C	Porsche Type-935/82 3.0 L Turbo Flat-6	Y G	40	(Japan) Kazuo Mogi	1
(Switzerland) Swiss Team Salamin	Porsche 962C	Porsche Type-935/82 3.0 L Turbo Flat-6	Y G	40	(Switzerland) Antoine Salamin	2, 4–8
(Switzerland) Swiss Team Salamin	Porsche 962C	Porsche Type-935/82 3.0 L Turbo Flat-6	Y G	40	(Morocco) Max Cohen-Olivar	2, 5–7
(Switzerland) Swiss Team Salamin	Porsche 962C	Porsche Type-935/82 3.0 L Turbo Flat-6	Y G	40	(Italy) Giovanni Lavaggi	4, 8
(Switzerland) Swiss Team Salamin	Porsche 962C	Porsche Type-935/82 3.0 L Turbo Flat-6	D	41	(Austria) Walter Lechner	2
(Switzerland) Swiss Team Salamin	Porsche 962C	Porsche Type-935/82 3.0 L Turbo Flat-6	D	41	(Austria) Ernst Franzmaier	2
(Switzerland) Team Sauber Mercedes	Sauber-Mercedes C9/88	Mercedes-Benz M119 5.0 L Turbo V8	M	61	(Italy) Mauro Baldi	1–4, 6–8
(Switzerland) Team Sauber Mercedes	Sauber-Mercedes C9/88	Mercedes-Benz M119 5.0 L Turbo V8	M	61	(United Kingdom) Kenny Acheson	1–4, 6–8
(Switzerland) Team Sauber Mercedes	Sauber-Mercedes C9/88	Mercedes-Benz M119 5.0 L Turbo V8	M	61	(France) Jean-Louis Schlesser	1, 5
(Switzerland) Team Sauber Mercedes	Sauber-Mercedes C9/88	Mercedes-Benz M119 5.0 L Turbo V8	M	61	(West Germany) Jochen Mass	5
(Switzerland) Team Sauber Mercedes	Sauber-Mercedes C9/88	Mercedes-Benz M119 5.0 L Turbo V8	M	62	(France) Jean-Louis Schlesser	1–4, 6–8
(Switzerland) Team Sauber Mercedes	Sauber-Mercedes C9/88	Mercedes-Benz M119 5.0 L Turbo V8	M	62	(West Germany) Jochen Mass	1–4, 6–8
(Switzerland) Team Sauber Mercedes	Sauber-Mercedes C9/88	Mercedes-Benz M119 5.0 L Turbo V8	M	62	(United Kingdom) Kenny Acheson	1, 5
(Switzerland) Team Sauber Mercedes	Sauber-Mercedes C9/88	Mercedes-Benz M119 5.0 L Turbo V8	M	62	(Italy) Mauro Baldi	5
(West Germany) Obermaier Primagaz	Porsche 962C	Porsche Type-935/82 3.0 L Turbo Flat-6	B G	72	(West Germany) Harald Grohs	1
(West Germany) Obermaier Primagaz	Porsche 962C	Porsche Type-935/82 3.0 L Turbo Flat-6	B G	72	(Japan) Akihiko Nakaya	1
(West Germany) Obermaier Primagaz	Porsche 962C	Porsche Type-935/82 3.0 L Turbo Flat-6	B G	72	(West Germany) Jürgen Lässig	2–5, 7–8
(West Germany) Obermaier Primagaz	Porsche 962C	Porsche Type-935/82 3.0 L Turbo Flat-6	B G	72	(France) Pierre Yver	2–5, 7–8
(United Kingdom) Chamberlain Engineering	Spice SE89C	Ford Cosworth DFZ 3.5 L V8	G	101	(United Kingdom) Nick Adams	8
(United Kingdom) Chamberlain Engineering	Spice SE89C	Ford Cosworth DFZ 3.5 L V8	G	101	(Spain) Fermín Vélez	8

=== Group C2 ===
Entrant	Car	Engine	Tyre	No.	Drivers	Rounds
(United Kingdom) Chamberlain Engineering	Spice SE89C	Ford Cosworth DFL 3.3 L V8	G	101	(United Kingdom) Nick Adams	1–7
(United Kingdom) Chamberlain Engineering	Spice SE89C	Ford Cosworth DFL 3.3 L V8	G	101	(Spain) Fermín Vélez	1–7
(United Kingdom) Chamberlain Engineering	Spice SE86C	Hart 418T 1.9 L Turbo I4	G	102	(Italy) Luigi Taverna	2–7
(United Kingdom) Chamberlain Engineering	Spice SE86C	Hart 418T 1.9 L Turbo I4	G	102	(United Kingdom) John Williams	2–6
(United Kingdom) Chamberlain Engineering	Spice SE86C	Hart 418T 1.9 L Turbo I4	G	102	(Netherlands) Hendrik ten Cate	7
(United Kingdom) Chamberlain Engineering	Spice SE86C	Hart 418T 1.9 L Turbo I4	G	102	(Mexico) Tomas Lopez	8
(United Kingdom) Chamberlain Engineering	Spice SE86C	Hart 418T 1.9 L Turbo I4	G	102	(Belgium) Quirin Bovy	8
France Prototeam	Spice SE88C	Ford Cosworth DFL 3.3 L V8	G	103	(Switzerland) Bernard Thuner	1–5, 7–8
France Prototeam	Spice SE88C	Ford Cosworth DFL 3.3 L V8	G	103	(Italy) Almo Coppelli	1–2, 4
France Prototeam	Spice SE88C	Ford Cosworth DFL 3.3 L V8	G	103	(France) Claude Ballot-Léna	3, 5, 7
France Prototeam	Spice SE88C	Ford Cosworth DFL 3.3 L V8	G	103	(France) Jean Messaoudi	8
(Italy) Porto Kaleo Team	Tiga GC288; Tiga GC289	Ford Cosworth DFL 3.3 L V8	G	105	(Italy) Maurizio Gellini	2
(Italy) Porto Kaleo Team	Tiga GC288; Tiga GC289	Ford Cosworth DFL 3.3 L V8	G	105	(Finland) Jari Nurminen	2
(Italy) Porto Kaleo Team	Tiga GC288; Tiga GC289	Ford Cosworth DFL 3.3 L V8	G	105	(Italy) Stefano Sebastiani	4, 6–7
(Italy) Porto Kaleo Team	Tiga GC288; Tiga GC289	Ford Cosworth DFL 3.3 L V8	G	105	(Italy) Vito Veninata	4
(Italy) Porto Kaleo Team	Tiga GC288; Tiga GC289	Ford Cosworth DFL 3.3 L V8	G	105	(United Kingdom) Mike Kimpton	6
(Italy) Porto Kaleo Team	Tiga GC288; Tiga GC289	Ford Cosworth DFL 3.3 L V8	G	105	(Switzerland) Jean-Pierre Frey	7
(Italy) Porto Kaleo Team	Tiga GC288; Tiga GC289	Ford Cosworth DFL 3.3 L V8	G	106	(Italy) Ranieri Randaccio	2–8
(Italy) Porto Kaleo Team	Tiga GC288; Tiga GC289	Ford Cosworth DFL 3.3 L V8	G	106	(Italy) Pasquale Barberio	2–8
(United Kingdom) Tiga Race Team	Tiga GC289	Ford Cosworth DFL 3.3 L V8	G	107	(Finland) Jari Nurminen	1, 3, 6–8
(United Kingdom) Tiga Race Team	Tiga GC289	Ford Cosworth DFL 3.3 L V8	G	107	(Italy) Luigi Taverna	1
(United Kingdom) Tiga Race Team	Tiga GC289	Ford Cosworth DFL 3.3 L V8	G	107	(France) Jean-Claude Justice	2
(United Kingdom) Tiga Race Team	Tiga GC289	Ford Cosworth DFL 3.3 L V8	G	107	(France) Jean-Claude Ferranin	2
(United Kingdom) Tiga Race Team	Tiga GC289	Ford Cosworth DFL 3.3 L V8	G	107	(Switzerland) Mario Hytten	3–4
(United Kingdom) Tiga Race Team	Tiga GC289	Ford Cosworth DFL 3.3 L V8	G	107	(United Kingdom) John Sheldon	4–5
(United Kingdom) Tiga Race Team	Tiga GC289	Ford Cosworth DFL 3.3 L V8	G	107	(United States) Stephen Hynes	5
(United Kingdom) Tiga Race Team	Tiga GC289	Ford Cosworth DFL 3.3 L V8	G	107	(United Kingdom) Tony Trevor	6
(United Kingdom) Tiga Race Team	Tiga GC289	Ford Cosworth DFL 3.3 L V8	G	107	(Italy) Carlo Rossi	7
(United Kingdom) Tiga Race Team	Tiga GC289	Ford Cosworth DFL 3.3 L V8	G	107	(Mexico) Oscar Hidalgo	8
(United Kingdom) Roy Baker Racing (United Kingdom) RBR GP Motorsport	Tiga GC289; Spice SE87C	Ford Cosworth DFL 3.3 L V8	D G	108	(United Kingdom) John Sheldon	1
(United Kingdom) Roy Baker Racing (United Kingdom) RBR GP Motorsport	Tiga GC289; Spice SE87C	Ford Cosworth DFL 3.3 L V8	D G	108	(Sweden) Leif Lindström	1
(United Kingdom) Roy Baker Racing (United Kingdom) RBR GP Motorsport	Tiga GC289; Spice SE87C	Ford Cosworth DFL 3.3 L V8	D G	108	(France) Philippe de Henning	2, 4–8
(United Kingdom) Roy Baker Racing (United Kingdom) RBR GP Motorsport	Tiga GC289; Spice SE87C	Ford Cosworth DFL 3.3 L V8	D G	108	(United Kingdom) Dudley Wood	2, 4–7
(United Kingdom) Roy Baker Racing (United Kingdom) RBR GP Motorsport	Tiga GC289; Spice SE87C	Ford Cosworth DFL 3.3 L V8	D G	108	(United Kingdom) Chris Hodgetts	8
(United Kingdom) PC Automotive	Spice SE88C; ADA 02B	Ford Cosworth DFL 3.3 L V8	G	111	(United States) Olindo Iacobelli	2–8
(United Kingdom) PC Automotive	Spice SE88C; ADA 02B	Ford Cosworth DFL 3.3 L V8	G	111	(United Kingdom) Richard Piper	2–8
(Switzerland) Pierre-Alain Lombardi	Spice SE86C; Spice SE88C	Ford Cosworth DFL 3.3 L V8; Buick 4.5 L V6	G	151	(Switzerland) Pierre-Alain Lombardi	2, 4–7
(Switzerland) Pierre-Alain Lombardi	Spice SE86C; Spice SE88C	Ford Cosworth DFL 3.3 L V8; Buick 4.5 L V6	G	151	(France) Bruno Sotty	2, 4–7
(Switzerland) Pierre-Alain Lombardi	Spice SE86C; Spice SE88C	Ford Cosworth DFL 3.3 L V8; Buick 4.5 L V6	G	151	(Mexico) Carlos Guerrero	8
(Switzerland) Pierre-Alain Lombardi	Spice SE86C; Spice SE88C	Ford Cosworth DFL 3.3 L V8; Buick 4.5 L V6	G	151	(Mexico) Aurelio Lopez	8
(United Kingdom) Team Mako	Spice SE88C	Ford Cosworth DFL 3.3 L V8	G	171	(United Kingdom) James Shead	2–7
(United Kingdom) Team Mako	Spice SE88C	Ford Cosworth DFL 3.3 L V8	G	171	(United Kingdom) Don Shead	2
(United Kingdom) Team Mako	Spice SE88C	Ford Cosworth DFL 3.3 L V8	G	171	(Canada) Robbie Stirling	3–7
(United Kingdom) Team Mako	Spice SE88C	Ford Cosworth DFL 3.3 L V8	G	171	(Mexico) Andres Contreras	8
(United Kingdom) Team Mako	Spice SE88C	Ford Cosworth DFL 3.3 L V8	G	171	(Mexico) Giovanni Aloi	8
(France) Automobiles Louis Descartes	ALD 04; ALD 06	BMW M88 3.5 L I6	G	176	(France) Sylvain Boulay	2
(France) Automobiles Louis Descartes	ALD 04; ALD 06	BMW M88 3.5 L I6	G	176	(France) Thierry Serfaty	2
(France) Automobiles Louis Descartes	ALD 04; ALD 06	BMW M88 3.5 L I6	G	176	(France) François Wettling	7
(France) Automobiles Louis Descartes	ALD 04; ALD 06	BMW M88 3.5 L I6	G	176	(France) Thierry Lecerf	7
(France) Automobiles Louis Descartes	ALD C289	Ford Cosworth DFL 3.3 L V8	G	177	(France) Alain Serpaggi	2–8
(France) Automobiles Louis Descartes	ALD C289	Ford Cosworth DFL 3.3 L V8	G	177	(France) Louis Descartes	2–4
(France) Automobiles Louis Descartes	ALD C289	Ford Cosworth DFL 3.3 L V8	G	177	(France) Marc Fontan	5–8
(France) Didier Bonnet	ALD 06; ALD 05; Tiga GC289	Ford Cosworth DFL 3.3 L V8	G	178	(France) Gérard Tremblay	2–7
(France) Didier Bonnet	ALD 06; ALD 05; Tiga GC289	Ford Cosworth DFL 3.3 L V8	G	178	(France) Didier Bonnet	2
(France) Didier Bonnet	ALD 06; ALD 05; Tiga GC289	Ford Cosworth DFL 3.3 L V8	G	178	(France) Jean-Claude Justice	3–5
(France) Didier Bonnet	ALD 06; ALD 05; Tiga GC289	Ford Cosworth DFL 3.3 L V8	G	178	(France) Joel Aulen	6
(France) Didier Bonnet	ALD 06; ALD 05; Tiga GC289	Ford Cosworth DFL 3.3 L V8	G	178	(France) Patrick Oudet	7–8
(France) Didier Bonnet	ALD 06; ALD 05; Tiga GC289	Ford Cosworth DFL 3.3 L V8	G	178	(France) Gérard Cuynet	8

=== IMSA GTP ===
Entrant	Car	Engine	Tyre	No.	Drivers	Rounds
(Japan) Mazdaspeed	Mazda 767; Mazda 767B	Mazda 13J 2.6 L 4-Rotor	D	201	(Japan) Takashi Yorino	1
(Japan) Mazdaspeed	Mazda 767; Mazda 767B	Mazda 13J 2.6 L 4-Rotor	D	201	(Japan) Tetsuya Oota	1
(Japan) Mazdaspeed	Mazda 767; Mazda 767B	Mazda 13J 2.6 L 4-Rotor	D	201	(Belgium) Pierre Dieudonné	2, 4–8
(Japan) Mazdaspeed	Mazda 767; Mazda 767B	Mazda 13J 2.6 L 4-Rotor	D	201	(Republic of Ireland) David Kennedy	2, 4–8
(Japan) Mazdaspeed	Mazda 767; Mazda 767B	Mazda 13J 2.6 L 4-Rotor	D	202	(Japan) Yoshimi Katayama	1
(Japan) Mazdaspeed	Mazda 767; Mazda 767B	Mazda 13J 2.6 L 4-Rotor	D	202	(Japan) Yojiro Terada	1

== Results and standings ==
=== Race results ===
Rnd	Circuit	Outright Winning Team	Group C2 Winning Team	Reports
Rnd	Circuit	Outright Winning Drivers	Group C2 Winning Drivers	Reports
1	Suzuka	(Switzerland) No. 61 Team Sauber Mercedes	(United Kingdom) No. 101 Chamberlain Engineering	Report
1	Suzuka	(France) Jean-Louis Schlesser (Italy) Mauro Baldi	(Spain) Fermín Velez (United Kingdom) Nick Adams	Report
2	Dijon-Prenois	(Germany) No. 7 Joest Racing	(United Kingdom) No. 101 Chamberlain Engineering	Report
2	Dijon-Prenois	(France) Bob Wollek (West Germany) Frank Jelinski	(Spain) Fermín Velez (United Kingdom) Nick Adams	Report
3	Jarama	(Switzerland) No. 62 Team Sauber Mercedes	(United Kingdom) No. 101 Chamberlain Engineering	Report
3	Jarama	(France) Jean-Louis Schlesser (West Germany) Jochen Mass	(Spain) Fermín Velez (United Kingdom) Nick Adams	Report
4	Brands Hatch	(Switzerland) No. 61 Team Sauber Mercedes	(United Kingdom) No. 101 Chamberlain Engineering	Report
4	Brands Hatch	(United Kingdom) Kenny Acheson (Italy) Mauro Baldi	(Spain) Fermín Velez (United Kingdom) Nick Adams	Report
5	Nürburgring	(Switzerland) No. 61 Team Sauber Mercedes	(United Kingdom) No. 171 Team Mako	Report
5	Nürburgring	(France) Jean-Louis Schlesser (West Germany) Jochen Mass	(United Kingdom) James Shead (Canada) Robbie Stirling	Report
6	Donington	(Switzerland) No. 61 Team Sauber Mercedes	(United Kingdom) No. 107 Tiga Race Team	Report
6	Donington	(France) Jean-Louis Schlesser (West Germany) Jochen Mass	(Finland) Jari Nurminen (United Kingdom) Tony Trevor	Report
7	Spa-Francorchamps	(Switzerland) No. 61 Team Sauber Mercedes	(United Kingdom) No. 127 Team Mako	Report
7	Spa-Francorchamps	(United Kingdom) Kenny Acheson (Italy) Mauro Baldi	(United Kingdom) James Shead (Canada) Robbie Stirling	Report
8	Mexico City	(Switzerland) No. 62 Team Sauber Mercedes	(United Kingdom) No. 127 Team Mako	Report
8	Mexico City	(France) Jean-Louis Schlesser (West Germany) Jochen Mass	(Mexico) Andreas Contreras (Mexico) Giovanni Aloi	Report

Points system
Category	1st	2nd	3rd	4th	5th	6th	7th	8th	9th	10th
Group C1	20	15	12	10	8	6	4	3	2	1
Group C2	22	17	14	12	10	8	6	5	4	3

In order to be classified for points, a team had to complete 90% of the winner's distance. Further, drivers were required to complete at least 30% of their car's total race distance to qualify for championship points. Drivers forfeited points if they drove in more than one car during the race. Group C2 entries earned two extra points for any finish within the overall top ten finishing positions.

=== Drivers championships ===
Drivers only scored for their six best results. Points earned but not tallied toward their total are marked in parentheses.

==== World Sports Prototype Championship for Drivers ====
Pos	Driver	Team	(Japan) SUZ	(France) DIJ	(Spain) JAR	(United Kingdom) BHC	(Germany) NÜR	(United Kingdom) DON	(Belgium) SPA	(Mexico) MEX	Points
1	(France) Jean-Louis Schlesser	(Switzerland) Team Sauber Mercedes	1	2	1	(3)	1	1	Ret	1	115
2	(West Germany) Jochen Mass	(Switzerland) Team Sauber Mercedes	DNS	2	1	3	1	1	Ret	1	107
3	(Italy) Mauro Baldi	(Switzerland) Team Sauber Mercedes	1	3	(5)	1	2	2	1	Ret	102
4	(United Kingdom) Kenny Acheson	(Switzerland) Team Sauber Mercedes	2	3	(5)	1	2	2	1	Ret	97
5	(West Germany) Frank Jelinski	(West Germany) Joest Racing	3	1		2	Ret	4	2	3	84
6	(France) Bob Wollek	(West Germany) Joest Racing	3	1		2	Ret	4	2	Ret	72
7	(Argentina) Oscar Larrauri	(Switzerland) Repsol Brun Motorsport	8	9	3		6	5	4	2	54
8	(France) Patrick Tambay	(United Kingdom) Silk Cut Jaguar	Ret	Ret	2	5	10	Ret	Ret	6	30
8	(Netherlands) Jan Lammers	(United Kingdom) Silk Cut Jaguar	Ret	Ret	2	5	10	Ret	Ret	6	30
10	(United Kingdom) Andy Wallace	(United Kingdom) Silk Cut Jaguar	5	Ret	6	Ret	5	Ret	Ret	5	30
11	(United Kingdom) Mark Blundell	(Japan) Nissan Motorsports International		15	8			3	3	12	27
11	(United Kingdom) Julian Bailey	(Japan) Nissan Motorsports International		15	8			3	3	12	27
13	(Belgium) Harald Huysman	(Switzerland) Repsol Brun Motorsport	Ret	9	11	16	12	5	Ret	2	25
14	(France) Henri Pescarolo	France Prototeam	DNS	8							24
14	(France) Henri Pescarolo	(West Germany) Joest Racing				Ret	20	8	6	3	24
15	(United Kingdom) Brian Redman	(United Kingdom) Aston Martin		17		4	8	7	7	8	24
16	(United Kingdom) David Leslie	(United Kingdom) Aston Martin		17		4	8	6	Ret	8	22
17	(Denmark) John Nielsen	(United Kingdom) Silk Cut Jaguar	5	Ret	6	Ret	5		Ret		22
18	(Spain) Jesús Pareja	(Switzerland) Repsol Brun Motorsport	17	13	3	6	4	Ret	Ret	7	20
18	(Switzerland) Walter Brun	(Switzerland) Repsol Brun Motorsport	17	13		6	4	Ret	Ret	7	20
20	(Denmark) Thorkild Thyrring	(United Kingdom) Spice Engineering	Ret	Ret	4	Ret	Ret	Ret	5	10	19
21	(United Kingdom) Johnny Dumfries	(Japan) Toyota Team Tom's	19	4	10	Ret	7	10	8	Ret	19
22	(United Kingdom) Tiff Needell	(United Kingdom) Richard Lloyd Racing	18	5		Ret	15	11	Ret	4	18
22	(United Kingdom) Derek Bell	(United Kingdom) Richard Lloyd Racing	18	5		Ret	15	11		4	18
22	(South Africa) Wayne Taylor	(United Kingdom) Spice Engineering	Ret	Ret	4	Ret	Ret	Ret	5	DNS	18
25	(Italy) Giovanni Lavaggi	(West Germany) Porsche Kremer Racing	Ret		7		3	12	10		17
25	(Italy) Giovanni Lavaggi	(Switzerland) Swiss Team Salamin				Ret				DNS	17
25	(South Africa) George Fouché	(West Germany) Porsche Kremer Racing		18	7		3	12	10		17
27	(United Kingdom) Geoff Lees	(Japan) Toyota Team Tom's	19	4	DNS		7		8		17
28	(France) Pascal Fabre	(France) Courage Compétition	14	6	9	7	9	9	Ret	Ret	16
29	(France) Jean-Louis Ricci	(West Germany) Joest Racing	Ret	7		Ret	20	8	6	DNS	13
30	(France) Alain Ferté	France Prototeam	DNS	8							11
30	(France) Alain Ferté	(United Kingdom) Silk Cut Jaguar				Ret		Ret		5	11
31	(Japan) Toshio Suzuki	(Japan) Nissan Motorsports International	4								10
31	(Japan) Kazuyoshi Hoshino	(Japan) Nissan Motorsports International	4								10
31	(Austria) Roland Ratzenberger	(Japan) Toyota Team Tom's	23								10
31	(Austria) Roland Ratzenberger	(Switzerland) Repsol Brun Motorsport							4	DNS	10
34	(Austria) Franz Konrad	(West Germany) Dauer Racing	15	Ret							8
34	(Austria) Franz Konrad	(Switzerland) Repsol Brun Motorsport				16	6				8
34	(Austria) Franz Konrad	(West Germany) Porsche Kremer Racing								9	8
35	(Sweden) Stanley Dickens	(France) Porsche Alméras Montpellier	7								8
35	(Sweden) Stanley Dickens	(Switzerland) Repsol Brun Motorsport		Ret	11			Ret			8
35	(Sweden) Stanley Dickens	(United Kingdom) Aston Martin							7		8
36	(Belgium) Hervé Regout	(France) Courage Compétition				7	9	9	Ret		8
37	(Japan) Hitoshi Ogawa	(Japan) Toyota Team Tom's	6								6
37	(Italy) Paolo Barilla	(Japan) Toyota Team Tom's	6								6
37	(France) Jean-Louis Bousquet	(France) Courage Compétition		6							6
37	(Republic of Ireland) Michael Roe	(United Kingdom) Aston Martin						6	Ret		6
41	(Spain) Fermín Vélez	(United Kingdom) Chamberlain Engineering	23	11	13	8	Ret	15	13	14	5
41	(United Kingdom) Nick Adams	(United Kingdom) Chamberlain Engineering	23	11	13	8	Ret	15	13	14	5
43	(Japan) Kunimitsu Takahashi	(France) Porsche Alméras Montpellier	7								4
43	(France) Claude Ballot-Léna	(West Germany) Joest Racing	Ret	7							4
43	(France) Claude Ballot-Léna	France Prototeam			14	15	19	Ret	Ret		4
43	(United Kingdom) David Sears	(United Kingdom) Aston Martin						7			4
46	(Brazil) Maurizio Sandro Sala	(Switzerland) Repsol Brun Motorsport	8								3
46	(Republic of Ireland) David Kennedy	(Japan) Mazdaspeed		10		13	13	NC	9	13	3
46	(Belgium) Pierre Dieudonné	(Japan) Mazdaspeed		10		13	13	NC	9	13	3
49	(Japan) Masanori Sekiya	(West Germany) Porsche Kremer Racing	9								2
49	(Japan) Hideki Okada	(West Germany) Porsche Kremer Racing	9								2
49	(Belgium) Bernard de Dryver	(France) Courage Compétition			9						2
49	(Belgium) Uwe Schäfer	(Switzerland) Repsol Brun Motorsport		DNS		9	12	Ret	Ret		2
49	(Austria) Walter Lechner	(Switzerland) Swiss Team Salamin		22							2
49	(Austria) Walter Lechner	(Switzerland) Repsol Brun Motorsport				9					2
49	(West Germany) Manuel Reuter	(West Germany) Porsche Kremer Racing								9	2
55	(Japan) Akihiko Nakaya	(West Germany) Obermaier Primagaz	10								1
55	(Germany) Harald Grohs	(West Germany) Obermaier Primagaz	10								1
55	(France) Jean-Marie Alméras	(France) Porsche Alméras Montpellier		19	12	10	14		21	15	1
55	(France) Jacques Alméras	(France) Porsche Alméras Montpellier		19	12	10	14		21	15	1
55	(United Kingdom) John Watson	(Japan) Toyota Team Tom's				Ret		10		Ret	1
55	(Chile) Eliseo Salazar	(United Kingdom) Spice Engineering	Ret		Ret	Ret	Ret	Ret	Ret	10	1
Pos	Driver	Team	(Japan) SUZ	(France) DIJ	(Spain) JAR	(United Kingdom) BHC	(Germany) NÜR	(United Kingdom) DON	(Belgium) SPA	(Mexico) MEX	Points

Colour	Result
Gold	Winner
Silver	Second place
Bronze	Third place
Green	Points classification
Blue	Non-points classification
Blue	Non-classified finish (NC)
Purple	Retired, not classified (Ret)
Red	Did not qualify (DNQ)
Red	Did not pre-qualify (DNPQ)
Black	Disqualified (DSQ)
White	Did not start (DNS)
White	Withdrew (WD)
White	Race cancelled (C)
Blank	Did not practice (DNP)
Blank	Did not arrive (DNA)
Blank	Excluded (EX)

==== FIA Cup for C2 Drivers ====
Pos	Driver	Team	(Japan) SUZ	(France) DIJ	(Spain) JAR	(United Kingdom) BHC	(Germany) NÜR	(United Kingdom) DON	(Belgium) SPA	(Mexico) MEX	Points
1	(Spain) Fermín Vélez	(United Kingdom) Chamberlain Engineering	1	1	1	1	Ret	3	2		107
1	(United Kingdom) Nick Adams	(United Kingdom) Chamberlain Engineering	1	1	1	1	Ret	3	2		107
3	(United Kingdom) James Shead	(United Kingdom) Team Mako		4	Ret	2	1	2	1		80
4	(Canada) Robbie Stirling	(United Kingdom) Team Mako			Ret	2	1	2	1		70
5	(United States) Olindo Iacobelli	(United Kingdom) PC Automotive		3	3	Ret	2	Ret	3	4	61
5	(United Kingdom) Richard Piper	(United Kingdom) PC Automotive		3	3	Ret	2	Ret	3	4	61
7	(Switzerland) Bernard Thuner	France Prototeam	Ret	2	2	5	3		Ret	5	58
8	(Finland) Jari Nurminen	(United Kingdom) Tiga Race Team	Ret		4			1	Ret	7	41
8	(Finland) Jari Nurminen	(Italy) Porto Kaleo Team		5							41
9	(France) Claude Ballot-Léna	France Prototeam			2		3		Ret		27
10	(Italy) Ranieri Randaccio	(Italy) Porto Kaleo Team		Ret	Ret	8	Ret	Ret	4	3	25
10	(Italy) Pasquale Barberio	(Italy) Porto Kaleo Team		Ret	Ret	8	Ret	Ret	4	3	25
12	(France) Philippe de Henning	(United Kingdom) Roy Baker Racing		Ret		3	Ret	NC	6	6	24
13	(Italy) Luigi Taverna	(United Kingdom) Tiga Race Team	Ret								24
13	(Italy) Luigi Taverna	(United Kingdom) Chamberlain Engineering		Ret	5	6	4	Ret	Ret		24
13	(United Kingdom) John Williams	(United Kingdom) Chamberlain Engineering		Ret	5	6	4	Ret			24
15	(United Kingdom) Tony Trevor	(United Kingdom) Tiga Race Team						1			20
15	(Mexico) Giovanni Aloi	(United Kingdom) Team Mako								1	20
15	(Mexico) Andres Contreras	(United Kingdom) Team Mako								1	20
18	(Switzerland) Mario Hytten	(United Kingdom) Tiga Race Team			4	4					20
19	(Mexico) Carlos Guerrero	(Switzerland) Pierre-Alain Lombardi								2	15
19	(Mexico) Aurelio Lopez	(Switzerland) Pierre-Alain Lombardi								2	15
21	(United Kingdom) Dudley Wood	(United Kingdom) Roy Baker Racing		Ret		3	Ret	NC	DNS		12
22	(United Kingdom) Don Shead	(United Kingdom) Team Mako		4							10
22	(United Kingdom) John Sheldon	(United Kingdom) Roy Baker Racing	DSQ								10
22	(United Kingdom) John Sheldon	(United Kingdom) Tiga Race Team				4	Ret				10
24	(Italy) Maurizio Gellini	(Italy) Porto Kaleo Team		5							8
24	(Italy) Almo Coppelli	France Prototeam	Ret	2		5					8
24	(France) Alan Serpaggi	(France) Automobiles Louis Descartes		Ret	DNS	Ret	Ret	Ret	5	DNS	8
24	(France) Marc Fontan	(France) Automobiles Louis Descartes					Ret	Ret	5	DNS	8
24	(France) Jean Messaoudi	France Prototeam								5	8
29	(United Kingdom) Chris Hodgetts	(United Kingdom) Roy Baker Racing								6	6
30	(Switzerland) Pierre-Alain Lombardi	(Switzerland) Pierre-Alain Lombardi		Ret		7	Ret	Ret	Ret		4
30	(France) Bruno Sotty	(Switzerland) Pierre-Alain Lombardi		Ret		7	Ret	Ret	Ret		4
30	(Italy) Stefano Sebastiani	(Italy) Porto Kaleo Team				DNQ		Ret	7		4
30	(Switzerland) Jean-Pierre Frey	(Italy) Porto Kaleo Team							7		4
30	(Mexico) Oscar Hidalgo	(United Kingdom) Tiga Race Team								7	4
35	(France) Gérard Tremblay	(France) Didier Bonnet		DNQ	Ret	DNQ	Ret	Ret	8		3
35	(France) Patrick Oudet	(France) Didier Bonnet							8		3
35	(Belgium) Quirin Bovy	(United Kingdom) Chamberlain Engineering								8	3
35	(Mexico) Tomas Lopez	(United Kingdom) Chamberlain Engineering								8	3
39	(France) Thierry Lecerf	(France) Automobiles Louis Descartes							9		2
39	(France) François Wettling	(France) Automobiles Louis Descartes							9		2
Pos	Driver	Team	(Japan) SUZ	(France) DIJ	(Spain) JAR	(United Kingdom) BHC	(Germany) NÜR	(United Kingdom) DON	(Belgium) SPA	(Mexico) MEX	Points

=== Teams championships ===
Teams were only awarded points for their highest finishing entry.

==== World Sports Prototype Championship for Teams ====
Pos	Team	(Japan) SUZ	(France) DIJ	(Spain) JAR	(United Kingdom) BHC	(Germany) NÜR	(United Kingdom) DON	(Belgium) SPA	(Mexico) MEX	Points
1	(Switzerland) Team Sauber Mercedes	1	2	1	1	1	1	1	1	155
2	(West Germany) Joest Racing	3	1		2	20	4	2	3	84
3	(Switzerland) Repsol Brun Motorsport	8	9	3	6	4	5	4	2	66
4	(United Kingdom) Silk Cut Jaguar	5	Ret	2	5	5	Ret	Ret	5	47
5	(Japan) Nissan Motorsports International	4	15	8	Ret	Ret	3	3	12	37
6	(United Kingdom) Aston Martin		17		4	8	6	7	8	26
7	(Japan) Toyota Team Tom's	6	4	10	Ret	7	10	8	Ret	25
8	(West Germany) Porsche Kremer Racing	9	18	7		3	12	10	9	21
9	(United Kingdom) Spice Engineering	Ret	14	4	Ret	Ret	Ret	5	10	19
10	(United Kingdom) Richard Lloyd Racing	13	5		Ret	11	11	Ret	4	18
11	(France) Courage Compétition	14	6	9	7	9	9	Ret	Ret	16
12	(France) Porsche Alméras Montpellier	7	19	12	10	14		21	15	5
13	France Prototeam	Ret	8	14	15	19	Ret	Ret	20	3
13	(United Kingdom) Chamberlain Engineering	23	11	13	8	21	15	13	14	3
15	(Japan) Mazdaspeed	17	10		13	13	NC	9	13	3
16	(West Germany) Obermaier Primagaz	10	20	15	12	16		12	Ret	1

Colour	Result
Gold	Winner
Silver	Second place
Bronze	Third place
Green	Points classification
Blue	Non-points classification
Blue	Non-classified finish (NC)
Purple	Retired, not classified (Ret)
Red	Did not qualify (DNQ)
Red	Did not pre-qualify (DNPQ)
Black	Disqualified (DSQ)
White	Did not start (DNS)
White	Withdrew (WD)
White	Race cancelled (C)
Blank	Did not practice (DNP)
Blank	Did not arrive (DNA)
Blank	Excluded (EX)

==== FIA Cup for C2 Teams ====
Pos	Team	(Japan) SUZ	(France) DIJ	(Spain) JAR	(United Kingdom) BHC	(Germany) NÜR	(United Kingdom) DON	(Belgium) SPA	(Mexico) MEX	Points
1	(United Kingdom) Chamberlain Engineering	1	1	1	1	4	3	2	8	120
2	(United Kingdom) Team Mako		4	Ret	2	1	2	1	1	100
3	(United Kingdom) PC Automotive		3	3	Ret	2	Ret	3	4	61
4	France Prototeam	Ret	2	2	5	3		Ret	5	58
5	(United Kingdom) Tiga Race Team	Ret	DNS	4	4	Ret	1	Ret	7	44
6	(Italy) Porto Kaleo Team		5	Ret	8	Ret	Ret	4	3	33
7	(United Kingdom) Roy Baker Racing	DSQ	Ret		3	Ret	NC	6	6	24
8	(Switzerland) Pierre-Alain Lombardi		Ret		7	Ret	Ret	Ret	2	19
9	(France) Automobiles Louis Descartes		Ret	DNS	Ret	Ret	Ret	5	DNS	8
10	(France) Didier Bonnet		DNQ	Ret	DNQ	Ret	Ret	8	Ret	3
