= 1989 480 km of Brands Hatch =

Layout of the Brands Hatch (1988-1998)

The 1989 Brands Hatch Trophy was the fourth round of the 1989 World Sportscar Championship season. It took place at Brands Hatch, Great Britain on 23 July 1989.

== Official results ==
Class winners in bold. Cars failing to complete 75% of winner's distance marked as Not Classified (NC).

Pos	Class	No	Team	Drivers	Chassis	Tyre	Laps
Pos	Class	No	Team	Drivers	Engine	Tyre	Laps
1	**C1**	**61**	**(West Germany) Team Sauber Mercedes**	**(United Kingdom) Kenny Acheson (Italy) Mauro Baldi**	**Sauber C9**	MI	**115**
1	**C1**	**61**	**(West Germany) Team Sauber Mercedes**	**(United Kingdom) Kenny Acheson (Italy) Mauro Baldi**	**Mercedes-Benz M119 5.0L Turbo V8**	MI	**115**
2	C1	7	(West Germany) Blaupunkt Sachs Joest Racing	(West Germany) Frank Jelinski (France) Bob Wollek	Porsche 962C	G	115
2	C1	7	(West Germany) Blaupunkt Sachs Joest Racing	(West Germany) Frank Jelinski (France) Bob Wollek	Porsche Type-935 3.0L Turbo Flat-6	G	115
3	C1	62	(West Germany) Team Sauber Mercedes	(France) Jean-Louis Schlesser (West Germany) Jochen Mass	Sauber C9	MI	114
3	C1	62	(West Germany) Team Sauber Mercedes	(France) Jean-Louis Schlesser (West Germany) Jochen Mass	Mercedes-Benz M119 5.0L Turbo V8	MI	114
4	C1	18	(United Kingdom) Aston Martin (United Kingdom) Ecurie Ecosse	(United Kingdom) David Leslie (United Kingdom) Brian Redman	Aston Martin AMR1	G	112
4	C1	18	(United Kingdom) Aston Martin (United Kingdom) Ecurie Ecosse	(United Kingdom) David Leslie (United Kingdom) Brian Redman	Aston Martin RDP87 6.0L V8	G	112
5	C1	1	(United Kingdom) Silk Cut Jaguar	(Netherlands) Jan Lammers (France) Patrick Tambay	Jaguar XJR-11	D	111
5	C1	1	(United Kingdom) Silk Cut Jaguar	(Netherlands) Jan Lammers (France) Patrick Tambay	Jaguar JV6 3.5L Turbo V6	D	111
6	C1	6	(Switzerland) Repsol Brun Motorsport	(Argentina) Oscar Larrauri (Spain) Jesús Pareja	Porsche 962C	Y	111
6	C1	6	(Switzerland) Repsol Brun Motorsport	(Argentina) Oscar Larrauri (Spain) Jesús Pareja	Porsche Type-935 3.0L Turbo Flat-6	Y	111
7	C1	13	(France) Courage Compétition	(France) Pascal Fabre (Belgium) Hervé Regout	Cougar C22S	G	110
7	C1	13	(France) Courage Compétition	(France) Pascal Fabre (Belgium) Hervé Regout	Porsche Type-935 3.0L Turbo Flat-6	G	110
8	**C2**	**101**	**(United Kingdom) Chamberlain Engineering**	**(Spain) Fermín Velez (United Kingdom) Nick Adams**	**Spice SE89C**	G	**109**
8	**C2**	**101**	**(United Kingdom) Chamberlain Engineering**	**(Spain) Fermín Velez (United Kingdom) Nick Adams**	**Ford Cosworth DFL 3.3L V8**	G	**109**
9	C1	16	(Switzerland) Eterna Brun Motorsport	(West Germany) Uwe Schäfer (Austria) Walter Lechner	Porsche 962C	Y	109
9	C1	16	(Switzerland) Eterna Brun Motorsport	(West Germany) Uwe Schäfer (Austria) Walter Lechner	Porsche Type-935 3.0L Turbo Flat-6	Y	109
10	C1	34	(France) Porsche Alméras Montpellier	(France) Jacques Alméras (France) Jean-Marie Alméras	Porsche 962C	G	109
10	C1	34	(France) Porsche Alméras Montpellier	(France) Jacques Alméras (France) Jean-Marie Alméras	Porsche Type-935 3.0L Turbo Flat-6	G	109
11	C2	171	(United Kingdom) Team Mako	(United Kingdom) James Shead (Canada) Robbie Stirling	Spice SE88C	G	108
11	C2	171	(United Kingdom) Team Mako	(United Kingdom) James Shead (Canada) Robbie Stirling	Ford Cosworth DFL 3.3L V8	G	108
12	C1	72	(West Germany) Obermaier Primagaz	(West Germany) Jürgen Lässig (France) Pierre Yver	Porsche 962C	G	108
12	C1	72	(West Germany) Obermaier Primagaz	(West Germany) Jürgen Lässig (France) Pierre Yver	Porsche Type-935 3.0L Turbo Flat-6	G	108
13	**GTP**	**201**	**(Japan) Mazdaspeed**	**(Belgium) Pierre Dieudonné (Republic of Ireland) David Kennedy**	**Mazda 767B**	D	**108**
13	**GTP**	**201**	**(Japan) Mazdaspeed**	**(Belgium) Pierre Dieudonné (Republic of Ireland) David Kennedy**	**Mazda 13J 2.6L 4-Rotor**	D	**108**
14	C1	20	(United Kingdom) Team Davey	(United Kingdom) Tim Lee-Davey (South Africa) Desiré Wilson	Porsche 962C	D	108
14	C1	20	(United Kingdom) Team Davey	(United Kingdom) Tim Lee-Davey (South Africa) Desiré Wilson	Porsche Type-935 3.0L Turbo Flat-6	D	108
15	C1	26	France Proteam	(France) Claude Ballot-Léna (Greece) Costas Los	Spice SE88C	G	106
15	C1	26	France Proteam	(France) Claude Ballot-Léna (Greece) Costas Los	Ford Cosworth DFZ 3.5L V8	G	106
16	C1	5	(Switzerland) Hydro Aluminium Brun Motorsport	(Norway) Harald Huysman (Austria) Franz Konrad	Porsche 962C	Y	106
16	C1	5	(Switzerland) Hydro Aluminium Brun Motorsport	(Norway) Harald Huysman (Austria) Franz Konrad	Porsche Type-935 3.0L Turbo Flat-6	Y	106
17	C2	108	(United Kingdom) Roy Baker Racing (United Kingdom) GP Motorsport	(France) Philippe de Henning (United Kingdom) Dudley Wood	Spice SE87C	G	106
17	C2	108	(United Kingdom) Roy Baker Racing (United Kingdom) GP Motorsport	(France) Philippe de Henning (United Kingdom) Dudley Wood	Ford Cosworth DFL 3.3L V8	G	106
18	C2	107	(United Kingdom) Tiga Racing Team	(Switzerland) Mario Hytten (United Kingdom) John Sheldon	Tiga GC289	G	103
18	C2	107	(United Kingdom) Tiga Racing Team	(Switzerland) Mario Hytten (United Kingdom) John Sheldon	Ford Cosworth DFL 3.3L V8	G	103
19	C2	103	France Prototeam	(Italy) Almo Coppelli (Switzerland) Bernard Thuner	Spice SE88C	G	101
19	C2	103	France Prototeam	(Italy) Almo Coppelli (Switzerland) Bernard Thuner	Ford Cosworth DFL 3.3L V8	G	101
20	C2	102	(United Kingdom) Chamberlain Engineering	(Italy) Luigi Taverna (United Kingdom) John Williams	Spice SE86C	G	101
20	C2	102	(United Kingdom) Chamberlain Engineering	(Italy) Luigi Taverna (United Kingdom) John Williams	Hart 418T 1.8L Turbo I4	G	101
21	C2	151	(Switzerland) Pierre-Alain Lombardi	(Switzerland) Pierre-Alain Lombardi (France) Bruno Sotty	Spice SE86C	G	99
21	C2	151	(Switzerland) Pierre-Alain Lombardi	(Switzerland) Pierre-Alain Lombardi (France) Bruno Sotty	Ford Cosworth DFL 3.3L V8	G	99
22	C2	106	(Italy) Porto Kaleo Team	(Italy) Ranieri Randaccio (Italy) Pasquale Barberio	Tiga GC288/9	G	83
22	C2	106	(Italy) Porto Kaleo Team	(Italy) Ranieri Randaccio (Italy) Pasquale Barberio	Ford Cosworth 3.3L V8	G	83
23 DNF	C1	37	(Japan) Toyota Team Tom's	(United Kingdom) Johnny Dumfries (United Kingdom) John Watson	Toyota 89C-V	B	109
23 DNF	C1	37	(Japan) Toyota Team Tom's	(United Kingdom) Johnny Dumfries (United Kingdom) John Watson	Toyota R32V 3.2L Turbo V8	B	109
24 DNF	C1	2	(United Kingdom) Silk Cut Jaguar	(Denmark) John Nielsen (United Kingdom) Andy Wallace	Jaguar XJR-9	D	101
24 DNF	C1	2	(United Kingdom) Silk Cut Jaguar	(Denmark) John Nielsen (United Kingdom) Andy Wallace	Jaguar 7.0L V12	D	101
25 DNF	C1	21	(United Kingdom) Spice Engineering	(Chile) Eliseo Salazar (United Kingdom) Ray Bellm	Spice SE89C	G	99
25 DNF	C1	21	(United Kingdom) Spice Engineering	(Chile) Eliseo Salazar (United Kingdom) Ray Bellm	Ford Cosworth DFZ 3.5L V8	G	99
26 DNF	C1	14	(United Kingdom) Richard Lloyd Racing	(United Kingdom) Tiff Needell (United Kingdom) Derek Bell	Porsche 962C GTi	G	95
26 DNF	C1	14	(United Kingdom) Richard Lloyd Racing	(United Kingdom) Tiff Needell (United Kingdom) Derek Bell	Porsche Type-935 3.0L Turbo Flat-6	G	95
27 DNF	C1	29	(Italy) Mussato Action Car	(Italy) Bruno Giacomelli (Italy) Massimo Monti	Lancia LC2	D	83
27 DNF	C1	29	(Italy) Mussato Action Car	(Italy) Bruno Giacomelli (Italy) Massimo Monti	Ferrari 308C 3.0L Turbo V8	D	83
28 DNF	C1	3	(United Kingdom) Silk Cut Jaguar	(United States) Davy Jones (France) Alain Ferté	Jaguar XJR-11	D	80
28 DNF	C1	3	(United Kingdom) Silk Cut Jaguar	(United States) Davy Jones (France) Alain Ferté	Jaguar JV6 3.5L Turbo V6	D	80
29 DNF	C2	111	(United Kingdom) PC Automotive	(United Kingdom) Richard Piper (United States) Olindo Iacobelli	Spice SE88C	G	63
29 DNF	C2	111	(United Kingdom) PC Automotive	(United Kingdom) Richard Piper (United States) Olindo Iacobelli	Ford Cosworth DFL 3.3L V8	G	63
30 DNF	C1	8	(Germany) Blaupunkt Sachs Joest Racing	(France) Henri Pescarolo (France) Jean-Louis Ricci	Porsche 962C	G	45
30 DNF	C1	8	(Germany) Blaupunkt Sachs Joest Racing	(France) Henri Pescarolo (France) Jean-Louis Ricci	Porsche Type-935 3.0L Turbo Flat-6	G	45
31 DNF	C1	22	(United Kingdom) Spice Engineering	(South Africa) Wayne Taylor (Denmark) Thorkild Thyrring	Spice SE89C	G	44
31 DNF	C1	22	(United Kingdom) Spice Engineering	(South Africa) Wayne Taylor (Denmark) Thorkild Thyrring	Ford Cosworth DFZ 3.5L V8	G	44
32 DNF	C1	40	(Switzerland) Swiss Team Salamin	(Switzerland) Antoine Salamin (Italy) Giovanni Lavaggi	Porsche 962C	G	44
32 DNF	C1	40	(Switzerland) Swiss Team Salamin	(Switzerland) Antoine Salamin (Italy) Giovanni Lavaggi	Porsche Type-935 3.0L Turbo Flat-6	G	44
33 DNF	C1	15	(United Kingdom) Richard Lloyd Racing	(United Kingdom) James Weaver (United Kingdom) David Hunt	Porsche 962C GTi	G	38
33 DNF	C1	15	(United Kingdom) Richard Lloyd Racing	(United Kingdom) James Weaver (United Kingdom) David Hunt	Porsche Type-935 3.0L Turbo Flat-6	G	38
34 DNF	C2	177	(France) Automobiles Louis Descartes	(France) Louis Descartes (France) Alain Serpaggi	ALD C289	G	38
34 DNF	C2	177	(France) Automobiles Louis Descartes	(France) Louis Descartes (France) Alain Serpaggi	Ford Cosworth 3.3L V8	G	38
35 DNF	C1	23	(Japan) Nissan Motorsports International	(United Kingdom) Andrew Gilbert-Scott (United Kingdom) Julian Bailey	Nissan R89C	D	19
35 DNF	C1	23	(Japan) Nissan Motorsports International	(United Kingdom) Andrew Gilbert-Scott (United Kingdom) Julian Bailey	Nissan VRH35Z 3.5L Turbo V8	D	19
36 DNF	C1	17	(West Germany) Dauer Racing	(West Germany) Jochen Dauer (United Kingdom) Will Hoy	Porsche 962C	G	0
36 DNF	C1	17	(West Germany) Dauer Racing	(West Germany) Jochen Dauer (United Kingdom) Will Hoy	Porsche Type-935 3.0L Turbo Flat-6	G	0
DNQ	C2	106	(Italy) Porto Kaleo Team	(Italy) Vito Veninata (Italy) Stefano Sebastiani	Tiga GC288	G	-
DNQ	C2	106	(Italy) Porto Kaleo Team	(Italy) Vito Veninata (Italy) Stefano Sebastiani	Ford Cosworth 3.3L V8	G	-
DNQ	C2	178	(France) Didier Bonnet	(France) Jean-Claude Justice (France) Gérard Tremblay	Tiga GC289	G	-
DNQ	C2	178	(France) Didier Bonnet	(France) Jean-Claude Justice (France) Gérard Tremblay	Ford Cosworth DFL 3.3L V8	G	-

== Statistics ==
- Pole position – #1 Silk Cut Jaguar – 1:12.927
- Fastest lap – #61 Team Sauber Mercedes – 1:16.111
- Average speed – 178.642 km/h

World Sportscar Championship
Previous race: 1989 480 km of Jarama	1989 season	Next race: 1989 480 km of Nürburgring
