= 1989 480 km of Jarama =

Layout of the Circuito Permanente Del Jarama (1980-1989)

The 1989 Trofeo Repsol was the third round of the 1989 World Sportscar Championship season. It took place at the Circuito Permanente Del Jarama, Spain on June 25, 1989.

Due to a limited number of garages at Jarama this round was not mandatory, even though points were still awarded for the overall championships. Several top teams choosing not to attend include Richard Lloyd, Joest, Aston Martin, and Mazdaspeed.

== Official results ==
Class winners in bold. Cars failing to complete 75% of winner's distance marked as Not Classified (NC).

Pos	Class	No	Team	Drivers	Chassis	Tyre	Laps
Pos	Class	No	Team	Drivers	Engine	Tyre	Laps
1	**C1**	**62**	**(West Germany) Team Sauber Mercedes**	**(France) Jean-Louis Schlesser (West Germany) Jochen Mass**	**Sauber C9**	MI	**145**
1	**C1**	**62**	**(West Germany) Team Sauber Mercedes**	**(France) Jean-Louis Schlesser (West Germany) Jochen Mass**	**Mercedes-Benz M119 5.0L V8**	MI	**145**
2	C1	1	(United Kingdom) Silk Cut Jaguar	(Netherlands) Jan Lammers (France) Patrick Tambay	Jaguar XJR-9	D	144
2	C1	1	(United Kingdom) Silk Cut Jaguar	(Netherlands) Jan Lammers (France) Patrick Tambay	Jaguar 7.0L V12	D	144
3	C1	6	(Switzerland) Repsol Brun Motorsport	(Argentina) Oscar Larrauri (Spain) Jesús Pareja	Porsche 962C	Y	143
3	C1	6	(Switzerland) Repsol Brun Motorsport	(Argentina) Oscar Larrauri (Spain) Jesús Pareja	Porsche Type-935 3.0L Turbo Flat-6	Y	143
4	C1	22	(United Kingdom) Spice Engineering	(South Africa) Wayne Taylor (Denmark) Thorkild Thyrring	Spice SE89C	G	143
4	C1	22	(United Kingdom) Spice Engineering	(South Africa) Wayne Taylor (Denmark) Thorkild Thyrring	Ford Cosworth DFZ 3.5L V8	G	143
5	C1	61	(West Germany) Team Sauber Mercedes	(United Kingdom) Kenny Acheson (Italy) Mauro Baldi	Sauber C9	MI	143
5	C1	61	(West Germany) Team Sauber Mercedes	(United Kingdom) Kenny Acheson (Italy) Mauro Baldi	Mercedes-Benz M119 5.0L V8	MI	143
6	C1	2	(United Kingdom) Silk Cut Jaguar	(Denmark) John Nielsen (United Kingdom) Andy Wallace	Jaguar XJR-9	D	142
6	C1	2	(United Kingdom) Silk Cut Jaguar	(Denmark) John Nielsen (United Kingdom) Andy Wallace	Jaguar 7.0L V12	D	142
7	C1	10	(West Germany) Porsche Kremer Racing	(Italy) Giovanni Lavaggi (South Africa) George Fouché	Porsche 962CK6	Y	141
7	C1	10	(West Germany) Porsche Kremer Racing	(Italy) Giovanni Lavaggi (South Africa) George Fouché	Porsche Type-935 3.0L Turbo Flat-6	Y	141
8	C1	23	(Japan) Nissan Motorsports International	(United Kingdom) Mark Blundell (United Kingdom) Julian Bailey	Nissan R89C	D	140
8	C1	23	(Japan) Nissan Motorsports International	(United Kingdom) Mark Blundell (United Kingdom) Julian Bailey	Nissan VRH35Z 3.5L Turbo V8	D	140
9	C1	13	(France) Courage Compétition	(France) Pascal Fabre (Belgium) Bernard de Dryver	Cougar C22S	G	139
9	C1	13	(France) Courage Compétition	(France) Pascal Fabre (Belgium) Bernard de Dryver	Porsche Type-935 3.0L Turbo Flat-6	G	139
10	C1	37	(Japan) Toyota Team Tom's	(United Kingdom) Johnny Dumfries	Toyota 89C-V	B	139
10	C1	37	(Japan) Toyota Team Tom's	(United Kingdom) Johnny Dumfries	Toyota R32V 3.2L Turbo V8	B	139
11	C1	5	(Switzerland) Repsol Brun Motorsport	(Norway) Harald Huysman (Sweden) Stanley Dickens	Porsche 962C	Y	139
11	C1	5	(Switzerland) Repsol Brun Motorsport	(Norway) Harald Huysman (Sweden) Stanley Dickens	Porsche Type-935 3.0L Turbo Flat-6	Y	139
12	C1	34	(France) Porsche Alméras Montpellier	(France) Jacques Alméras (France) Jean-Marie Alméras	Porsche 962C	G	137
12	C1	34	(France) Porsche Alméras Montpellier	(France) Jacques Alméras (France) Jean-Marie Alméras	Porsche Type-935 3.0L Turbo Flat-6	G	137
13	**C2**	**101**	**(United Kingdom) Chamberlain Engineering**	**(Spain) Fermín Velez (United Kingdom) Nick Adams**	**Spice SE89C**	G	**135**
13	**C2**	**101**	**(United Kingdom) Chamberlain Engineering**	**(Spain) Fermín Velez (United Kingdom) Nick Adams**	**Ford Cosworth DFL 3.3L V8**	G	**135**
14	C2	103	France Prototeam	(France) Claude Ballot-Léna (Switzerland) Bernard Thuner	Spice SE88C	G	131
14	C2	103	France Prototeam	(France) Claude Ballot-Léna (Switzerland) Bernard Thuner	Ford Cosworth DFL 3.3L V8	G	131
15	C1	72	(West Germany) Obermaier Primagaz	(West Germany) Jürgen Lässig (France) Pierre Yver	Porsche 962C	G	131
15	C1	72	(West Germany) Obermaier Primagaz	(West Germany) Jürgen Lässig (France) Pierre Yver	Porsche Type-935 3.0L Turbo Flat-6	G	131
16	C1	20	(United Kingdom) Team Davey	(United Kingdom) Tim Lee-Davey (Morocco) Max Cohen-Olivar	Porsche 962C	D	129
16	C1	20	(United Kingdom) Team Davey	(United Kingdom) Tim Lee-Davey (Morocco) Max Cohen-Olivar	Porsche Type-935 3.0L Turbo Flat-6	D	129
17	C2	111	(United Kingdom) PC Automotive	(United Kingdom) Richard Piper (United States) Olindo Iacobelli	Spice SE88C	G	126
17	C2	111	(United Kingdom) PC Automotive	(United Kingdom) Richard Piper (United States) Olindo Iacobelli	Ford Cosworth DFL 3.3L V8	G	126
18	C2	107	(United Kingdom) Tiga Racing Team	(Switzerland) Mario Hytten (Finland) Jari Nurminen	Tiga GC289	G	120
18	C2	107	(United Kingdom) Tiga Racing Team	(Switzerland) Mario Hytten (Finland) Jari Nurminen	Ford Cosworth DFL 3.3L V8	G	120
19	C2	102	(United Kingdom) Chamberlain Engineering	(Italy) Luigi Taverna (United Kingdom) John Williams	Spice SE86C	G	113
19	C2	102	(United Kingdom) Chamberlain Engineering	(Italy) Luigi Taverna (United Kingdom) John Williams	Hart 418T 1.8L Turbo I4	G	113
20 DNF	C1	21	(United Kingdom) Spice Engineering	(Chile) Eliseo Salazar (United Kingdom) Ray Bellm	Spice SE89C	G	121
20 DNF	C1	21	(United Kingdom) Spice Engineering	(Chile) Eliseo Salazar (United Kingdom) Ray Bellm	Ford Cosworth DFZ 3.5L V8	G	121
21 DNF	C2	106	(Italy) Porto Kaleo Team	(Italy) Ranieri Randaccio (Italy) Pasquale Barberio	Tiga GC288/9	G	82
21 DNF	C2	106	(Italy) Porto Kaleo Team	(Italy) Ranieri Randaccio (Italy) Pasquale Barberio	Ford Cosworth 3.3L V8	G	82
22 DNF	C2	171	(United Kingdom) Team Mako	(United Kingdom) James Shead (Canada) Robbie Stirling	Spice SE88C	G	37
22 DNF	C2	171	(United Kingdom) Team Mako	(United Kingdom) James Shead (Canada) Robbie Stirling	Ford Cosworth DFL 3.3L V8	G	37
23 DNF	C2	178	(France) Didier Bonnet	(France) Didier Bonnet (France) Gérard Tremblay	ALD C2	Y	13
23 DNF	C2	178	(France) Didier Bonnet	(France) Didier Bonnet (France) Gérard Tremblay	BMW M80 3.5L I6	Y	13
DNS	C2	177	(France) Automobiles Louis Descartes	(France) Louis Descartes (France) Alain Serpaggi	ALD C289	G	-
DNS	C2	177	(France) Automobiles Louis Descartes	(France) Louis Descartes (France) Alain Serpaggi	Ford Cosworth 3.3L V8	G	-

== Statistics ==
- Pole position - #61 Team Sauber Mercedes - 1:15.580
- Fastest lap - #61 Team Sauber Mercedes - 1:20.970
- Average speed - 139.720 km/h

World Sportscar Championship
Previous race: 1989 480 km of Dijon	1989 season	Next race: 1989 480 km of Brands Hatch
