= 1989 480 km of Dijon =

Layout of the Dijon circuit

The 1989 Coupe de Dijon was the second round of the 1989 World Sportscar Championship season. It took place at the Circuit Dijon-Prenois, France on 21 May 1989.

== Official results ==
Class winners in bold. Cars failing to complete 75% of winner's distance marked as Not Classified (NC).

Pos	Class	No	Team	Drivers	Chassis	Tyre	Laps
Pos	Class	No	Team	Drivers	Engine	Tyre	Laps
1	**C1**	**7**	**(West Germany) Joest Racing**	**(West Germany) Frank Jelinski (France) Bob Wollek**	**Porsche 962C**	G	**127**
1	**C1**	**7**	**(West Germany) Joest Racing**	**(West Germany) Frank Jelinski (France) Bob Wollek**	**Porsche Type-935 3.0L Turbo Flat-6**	G	**127**
2	C1	62	(West Germany) Team Sauber Mercedes	(France) Jean-Louis Schlesser (West Germany) Jochen Mass	Sauber C9	MI	127
2	C1	62	(West Germany) Team Sauber Mercedes	(France) Jean-Louis Schlesser (West Germany) Jochen Mass	Mercedes-Benz M119 5.0L V8	MI	127
3	C1	61	(West Germany) Team Sauber Mercedes	(United Kingdom) Kenny Acheson (Italy) Mauro Baldi	Sauber C9	MI	127
3	C1	61	(West Germany) Team Sauber Mercedes	(United Kingdom) Kenny Acheson (Italy) Mauro Baldi	Mercedes-Benz M119 5.0L V8	MI	127
4	C1	37	(Japan) Toyota Team Tom's	(United Kingdom) Geoff Lees (United Kingdom) Johnny Dumfries	Toyota 88C	B	126
4	C1	37	(Japan) Toyota Team Tom's	(United Kingdom) Geoff Lees (United Kingdom) Johnny Dumfries	Toyota 3S-GTM 2.2L Turbo I4	B	126
5	C1	14	(United Kingdom) Richard Lloyd Racing	(United Kingdom) Tiff Needell (United Kingdom) Derek Bell	Porsche 962C GTi	G	124
5	C1	14	(United Kingdom) Richard Lloyd Racing	(United Kingdom) Tiff Needell (United Kingdom) Derek Bell	Porsche Type-935 3.0L Turbo Flat-6	G	124
6	C1	13	(France) Courage Compétition	(France) Pascal Fabre (France) Jean-Louis Bousquet	Cougar C22S	G	123
6	C1	13	(France) Courage Compétition	(France) Pascal Fabre (France) Jean-Louis Bousquet	Porsche Type-935 3.0L Turbo Flat-6	G	123
7	C1	8	(West Germany) Joest Racing	(France) Jean-Louis Ricci (France) Claude Ballot-Léna	Porsche 962C	G	123
7	C1	8	(West Germany) Joest Racing	(France) Jean-Louis Ricci (France) Claude Ballot-Léna	Porsche Type-935 3.0L Turbo Flat-6	G	123
8	C1	26	France Prototeam	(France) Alain Ferté (France) Henri Pescarolo	Spice SE88C	G	122
8	C1	26	France Prototeam	(France) Alain Ferté (France) Henri Pescarolo	Ford Cosworth DFZ 3.5L V8	G	122
9	C1	5	(Switzerland) Repsol Brun Motorsport	(Norway) Harald Huysman (Argentina) Oscar Larrauri	Porsche 962C	Y	122
9	C1	5	(Switzerland) Repsol Brun Motorsport	(Norway) Harald Huysman (Argentina) Oscar Larrauri	Porsche Type-935 3.0L Turbo Flat-6	Y	122
10	**GTP**	**201**	**(Japan) Mazdaspeed**	**(Belgium) Pierre Dieudonné (Republic of Ireland) David Kennedy**	**Mazda 767B**	D	**121**
10	**GTP**	**201**	**(Japan) Mazdaspeed**	**(Belgium) Pierre Dieudonné (Republic of Ireland) David Kennedy**	**Mazda 13J 2.6L 4-Rotor**	D	**121**
11	**C2**	**101**	**(United Kingdom) Chamberlain Engineering**	**(Spain) Fermín Velez (United Kingdom) Nick Adams**	**Spice SE89C**	G	**121**
11	**C2**	**101**	**(United Kingdom) Chamberlain Engineering**	**(Spain) Fermín Velez (United Kingdom) Nick Adams**	**Ford Cosworth DFL 3.3L V8**	G	**121**
12	C1	41	(Switzerland) Swiss Team Salamin (Austria) Walter Lechner Racing School	(Austria) Walter Lechner (Austria) Ernst Franzmaier	Porsche 962C	G	121
12	C1	41	(Switzerland) Swiss Team Salamin (Austria) Walter Lechner Racing School	(Austria) Walter Lechner (Austria) Ernst Franzmaier	Porsche Type-935 3.0L Turbo Flat-6	G	121
13	C1	6	(Switzerland) Repsol Brun Motorsport	(Switzerland) Walter Brun (Spain) Jesús Pareja	Porsche 962C	Y	121
13	C1	6	(Switzerland) Repsol Brun Motorsport	(Switzerland) Walter Brun (Spain) Jesús Pareja	Porsche Type-935 3.0L Turbo Flat-6	Y	121
14	C1	21	(United Kingdom) Spice Engineering	(Greece) Costas Los (United Kingdom) Ray Bellm	Spice SE89C	G	121
14	C1	21	(United Kingdom) Spice Engineering	(Greece) Costas Los (United Kingdom) Ray Bellm	Ford Cosworth DFZ 3.5L V8	G	121
15	C1	23	(Japan) Nissan Motorsports International	(United Kingdom) Mark Blundell (United Kingdom) Julian Bailey	Nissan R89C	D	120
15	C1	23	(Japan) Nissan Motorsports International	(United Kingdom) Mark Blundell (United Kingdom) Julian Bailey	Nissan VRH35Z 3.5L Turbo V8	D	120
16	C2	103	France Prototeam	(Italy) Almo Coppelli (Switzerland) Bernard Thuner	Spice SE88C	G	120
16	C2	103	France Prototeam	(Italy) Almo Coppelli (Switzerland) Bernard Thuner	Ford Cosworth DFL 3.3L V8	G	120
17	C1	18	(United Kingdom) Aston Martin (United Kingdom) Ecurie Ecosse	(United Kingdom) Brian Redman (United Kingdom) David Leslie	Aston Martin AMR1	G	119
17	C1	18	(United Kingdom) Aston Martin (United Kingdom) Ecurie Ecosse	(United Kingdom) Brian Redman (United Kingdom) David Leslie	Aston Martin RDP87 6.0L V8	G	119
18	C1	10	(West Germany) Porsche Kremer Racing	(Italy) Bruno Giacomelli (South Africa) George Fouché	Porsche 962CK6	Y	118
18	C1	10	(West Germany) Porsche Kremer Racing	(Italy) Bruno Giacomelli (South Africa) George Fouché	Porsche Type-935 3.0L Turbo Flat-6	Y	118
19	C1	34	(France) Porsche Alméras Montpellier	(France) Jacques Alméras (France) Jean-Marie Alméras	Porsche 962C	G	118
19	C1	34	(France) Porsche Alméras Montpellier	(France) Jacques Alméras (France) Jean-Marie Alméras	Porsche Type-935 3.0L Turbo Flat-6	G	118
20	C1	72	(West Germany) Obermaier Primagaz	(West Germany) Jürgen Lässig (France) Pierre Yver	Porsche 962C	G	118
20	C1	72	(West Germany) Obermaier Primagaz	(West Germany) Jürgen Lässig (France) Pierre Yver	Porsche Type-935 3.0L Turbo Flat-6	G	118
21	C2	111	(United Kingdom) PC Automotive	(United Kingdom) Richard Piper (United States) Olindo Iacobelli	Spice SE88C	G	118
21	C2	111	(United Kingdom) PC Automotive	(United Kingdom) Richard Piper (United States) Olindo Iacobelli	Ford Cosworth DFL 3.3L V8	G	118
22	C1	40	(Switzerland) Swiss Team Salamin	(Switzerland) Antoine Salamin (Morocco) Max Cohen-Olivar	Porsche 962C	G	117
22	C1	40	(Switzerland) Swiss Team Salamin	(Switzerland) Antoine Salamin (Morocco) Max Cohen-Olivar	Porsche Type-935 3.0L Turbo Flat-6	G	117
23	C2	171	(United Kingdom) Team Mako	(United Kingdom) James Shead (United Kingdom) Don Shead	Spice SE88C	G	116
23	C2	171	(United Kingdom) Team Mako	(United Kingdom) James Shead (United Kingdom) Don Shead	Ford Cosworth DFL 3.3L V8	G	116
24	C2	105	(Italy) Porto Kaleo Team	(Italy) Maurizio Gellini (Finland) Jari Nurminen	Tiga GC288	G	113
24	C2	105	(Italy) Porto Kaleo Team	(Italy) Maurizio Gellini (Finland) Jari Nurminen	Ford Cosworth 3.3L V8	G	113
25	C1	20	(United Kingdom) Team Davey	(United Kingdom) Tim Lee-Davey (West Germany) Peter Oberndorfer	Porsche 962C	D	111
25	C1	20	(United Kingdom) Team Davey	(United Kingdom) Tim Lee-Davey (West Germany) Peter Oberndorfer	Porsche Type-935 3.0L Turbo Flat-6	D	111
26 DNF	C1	1	(United Kingdom) Silk Cut Jaguar	(Netherlands) Jan Lammers (France) Patrick Tambay	Jaguar XJR-9	D	125
26 DNF	C1	1	(United Kingdom) Silk Cut Jaguar	(Netherlands) Jan Lammers (France) Patrick Tambay	Jaguar 7.0L V12	D	125
27 DNF	C1	17	(West Germany) Dauer Racing	(West Germany) Jochen Dauer (Austria) Franz Konrad	Porsche 962C	G	93
27 DNF	C1	17	(West Germany) Dauer Racing	(West Germany) Jochen Dauer (Austria) Franz Konrad	Porsche Type-935 3.0L Turbo Flat-6	G	93
28 DNF	C2	106	(Italy) Porto Kaleo Team	(Italy) Ranieri Randaccio (Italy) Pasquale Barberio	Tiga GC288	G	93
28 DNF	C2	106	(Italy) Porto Kaleo Team	(Italy) Ranieri Randaccio (Italy) Pasquale Barberio	Ford Cosworth 3.3L V8	G	93
29 DNF	C1	2	(United Kingdom) Silk Cut Jaguar	(Denmark) John Nielsen (United Kingdom) Andy Wallace	Jaguar XJR-9	D	79
29 DNF	C1	2	(United Kingdom) Silk Cut Jaguar	(Denmark) John Nielsen (United Kingdom) Andy Wallace	Jaguar 7.0L V12	D	79
30 DNF	C2	151	(Switzerland) Pierre-Alain Lombardi	(Switzerland) Pierre-Alain Lombardi (France) Bruno Sotty	Spice SE86C	G	36
30 DNF	C2	151	(Switzerland) Pierre-Alain Lombardi	(Switzerland) Pierre-Alain Lombardi (France) Bruno Sotty	Ford Cosworth DFL 3.3L V8	G	36
31 DNF	C2	102	(United Kingdom) Chamberlain Engineering	(Italy) Luigi Taverna (United Kingdom) John Williams	Spice SE86C	G	35
31 DNF	C2	102	(United Kingdom) Chamberlain Engineering	(Italy) Luigi Taverna (United Kingdom) John Williams	Hart 418T 1.8L Turbo I4	G	35
32 DNF	C1	22	(United Kingdom) Spice Engineering	(South Africa) Wayne Taylor (Denmark) Thorkild Thyrring	Spice SE89C	G	32
32 DNF	C1	22	(United Kingdom) Spice Engineering	(South Africa) Wayne Taylor (Denmark) Thorkild Thyrring	Ford Cosworth DFZ 3.5L V8	G	32
33 DNF	C2	108	(United Kingdom) Roy Baker Racing (United Kingdom) GP Motorsport	(United Kingdom) Dudley Wood (France) Philippe de Henning	Spice SE87C	G	47
33 DNF	C2	108	(United Kingdom) Roy Baker Racing (United Kingdom) GP Motorsport	(United Kingdom) Dudley Wood (France) Philippe de Henning	Ford Cosworth DFL 3.3L V8	G	47
34 DNF	C1	29	(Italy) Mussato Action Car	(Italy) Franco Scapini (Italy) Andrea de Cesaris	Lancia LC2	D	19
34 DNF	C1	29	(Italy) Mussato Action Car	(Italy) Franco Scapini (Italy) Andrea de Cesaris	Ferrari 308C 3.0L Turbo V8	D	19
35 DNF	C2	177	(France) Automobiles Louis Descartes	(France) Louis Descartes (France) Alain Serpaggi	ALD C289	G	15
35 DNF	C2	177	(France) Automobiles Louis Descartes	(France) Louis Descartes (France) Alain Serpaggi	Ford Cosworth 3.3L V8	G	15
36 DNF	C1	16	(Switzerland) Repsol Brun Motorsport	(Argentina) Oscar Larrauri (Sweden) Stanley Dickens	Porsche 962C	Y	3
36 DNF	C1	16	(Switzerland) Repsol Brun Motorsport	(Argentina) Oscar Larrauri (Sweden) Stanley Dickens	Porsche Type-935 3.0L Turbo Flat-6	Y	3
DNS	C2	107	(United Kingdom) Tiga Racing Team (France) Jean-Claude Ferrarin	(France) Jean-Claude Ferrarin (France) Jean-Claude Justice	Tiga GC289	G	-
DNS	C2	107	(United Kingdom) Tiga Racing Team (France) Jean-Claude Ferrarin	(France) Jean-Claude Ferrarin (France) Jean-Claude Justice	Ford Cosworth DFL 3.3L V8	G	-
DNQ	C2	176	(France) Automobiles Louis Descartes	(France) Sylvain Bouley (France) Thierry Serfaty	ALD C2	G	-
DNQ	C2	176	(France) Automobiles Louis Descartes	(France) Sylvain Bouley (France) Thierry Serfaty	BMW M80 3.5L I6	G	-
DNQ	C2	178	(France) Didier Bonnet	(France) Didier Bonnet (France) Gérard Tremblay	ALD C2	Y	-
DNQ	C2	178	(France) Didier Bonnet	(France) Didier Bonnet (France) Gérard Tremblay	BMW M80 3.5L I6	Y	-

== Statistics ==
- Pole position - #62 Team Sauber Mercedes - 1:07.275
- Fastest lap - #61 Team Sauber Mercedes - 1:11.739
- Average speed - 178.339 km/h

World Sportscar Championship
Previous race: 1989 480 km of Suzuka	1989 season	Next race: 1989 480 km of Jarama
