= 1989 480 km of Suzuka =

Layout of the Suzuka International Racing Course (1987-2002)

The 1989 480 km of Suzuka was the first round of the 1989 World Sportscar Championship season. It took place at Suzuka Circuit, Japan on April 9, 1989.

== Official results ==
Class winners in bold. Cars failing to complete 75% of winner's distance marked as Not Classified (NC).

Pos	Class	No	Team	Drivers	Chassis	Tyre	Laps
Pos	Class	No	Team	Drivers	Engine	Tyre	Laps
1	**C1**	**61**	**(West Germany) Team Sauber Mercedes**	**(France) Jean-Louis Schlesser (Italy) Mauro Baldi**	**Sauber C9**	MI	**82**
1	**C1**	**61**	**(West Germany) Team Sauber Mercedes**	**(France) Jean-Louis Schlesser (Italy) Mauro Baldi**	**Mercedes-Benz M119 5.0L Turbo V8**	MI	**82**
2	C1	62	(West Germany) Team Sauber Mercedes	(United Kingdom) Kenny Acheson	Sauber C9	MI	82
2	C1	62	(West Germany) Team Sauber Mercedes	(United Kingdom) Kenny Acheson	Mercedes-Benz M119 5.0L Turbo V8	MI	82
3	C1	7	(West Germany) Joest Racing	(West Germany) Frank Jelinski (France) Bob Wollek	Porsche 962C	G	82
3	C1	7	(West Germany) Joest Racing	(West Germany) Frank Jelinski (France) Bob Wollek	Porsche Type-935 3.0L Turbo Flat-6	G	82
4	C1	23	(Japan) Nissan Motorsports International	(Japan) Toshio Suzuki (Japan) Kazuyoshi Hoshino	Nissan R88C	D	81
4	C1	23	(Japan) Nissan Motorsports International	(Japan) Toshio Suzuki (Japan) Kazuyoshi Hoshino	Nissan VRH30 3.0L Turbo V8	D	81
5	C1	2	(United Kingdom) Silk Cut Jaguar	(Denmark) John Nielsen (United Kingdom) Andy Wallace	Jaguar XJR-9	D	81
5	C1	2	(United Kingdom) Silk Cut Jaguar	(Denmark) John Nielsen (United Kingdom) Andy Wallace	Jaguar 7.0L V12	D	81
6	C1	36	(Japan) Toyota Team Tom's	(Italy) Paolo Barilla (Japan) Hitoshi Ogawa	Toyota 89C-V	B	81
6	C1	36	(Japan) Toyota Team Tom's	(Italy) Paolo Barilla (Japan) Hitoshi Ogawa	Toyota R32V 3.2L Turbo V8	B	81
7	C1	34	(France) Porsche Alméras Montpellier (Japan) Advan Team Alpha	(Japan) Kunimitsu Takahashi (Sweden) Stanley Dickens	Porsche 962C	G	81
7	C1	34	(France) Porsche Alméras Montpellier (Japan) Advan Team Alpha	(Japan) Kunimitsu Takahashi (Sweden) Stanley Dickens	Porsche Type-935 3.0L Turbo Flat-6	G	81
8	C1	16	(Switzerland) Repsol Brun Motorsport	(Argentina) Oscar Larrauri (Brazil) Maurizio Sandro Sala	Porsche 962C	Y	81
8	C1	16	(Switzerland) Repsol Brun Motorsport	(Argentina) Oscar Larrauri (Brazil) Maurizio Sandro Sala	Porsche Type-935 3.0L Turbo Flat-6	Y	81
9	C1	11	(West Germany) Porsche Kremer Racing (Japan) Leyton House Racing	(Japan) Masanori Sekiya (Japan) Hideki Okada	Porsche 962CK6	Y	81
9	C1	11	(West Germany) Porsche Kremer Racing (Japan) Leyton House Racing	(Japan) Masanori Sekiya (Japan) Hideki Okada	Porsche Type-935 3.2L Turbo Flat-6	Y	81
10	C1	72	(West Germany) Obermaier Primagaz (Japan) From-A Racing	(West Germany) Harald Grohs (Japan) Akihiko Nakaya	Porsche 962C	G	81
10	C1	72	(West Germany) Obermaier Primagaz (Japan) From-A Racing	(West Germany) Harald Grohs (Japan) Akihiko Nakaya	Porsche Type-935 3.0L Turbo Flat-6	G	81
11	C1	24	(Japan) Nissan Motorsports International	(Japan) Masahiro Hasemi (Sweden) Anders Olofsson	Nissan R88C	D	81
11	C1	24	(Japan) Nissan Motorsports International	(Japan) Masahiro Hasemi (Sweden) Anders Olofsson	Nissan VRH30 3.0L Turbo V8	D	81
12	C1	55	(United Kingdom) Team Davey (Japan) Omron Racing Team	(Australia) Vern Schuppan (Sweden) Eje Elgh	Porsche 962C	D	80
12	C1	55	(United Kingdom) Team Davey (Japan) Omron Racing Team	(Australia) Vern Schuppan (Sweden) Eje Elgh	Porsche Type-935 3.0L Turbo Flat-6	D	80
13	C1	100	(United Kingdom) Richard Lloyd Racing (Japan) Trust Racing Team	(Sweden) Steven Andskär (South Africa) George Fouché	Porsche 962C GTi	G	79
13	C1	100	(United Kingdom) Richard Lloyd Racing (Japan) Trust Racing Team	(Sweden) Steven Andskär (South Africa) George Fouché	Porsche Type-935 3.0L Turbo Flat-6	G	79
14	C1	13	(France) Courage Compétition	(France) Pascal Fabre (Italy) Alessandro Santin	Cougar C22S	G	79
14	C1	13	(France) Courage Compétition	(France) Pascal Fabre (Italy) Alessandro Santin	Porsche Type-935 3.0L Turbo Flat-6	G	79
15	C1	17	(West Germany) Dauer Racing	(West Germany) Jochen Dauer (Austria) Franz Konrad	Porsche 962C	G	78
15	C1	17	(West Germany) Dauer Racing	(West Germany) Jochen Dauer (Austria) Franz Konrad	Porsche Type-935 3.0L Turbo Flat-6	G	78
16	C1	40	(Switzerland) Swiss Team Salamin (Japan) Advan Alpha Tomei	(Japan) Kazou Mogi (Japan) Kenji Takahashi	Porsche 962C	G	78
16	C1	40	(Switzerland) Swiss Team Salamin (Japan) Advan Alpha Tomei	(Japan) Kazou Mogi (Japan) Kenji Takahashi	Porsche Type-935 3.0L Turbo Flat-6	G	78
17	**GTP**	**201**	**(Japan) Mazdaspeed**	**(Japan) Takashi Yorino (Japan) Tetsuya Ota**	**Mazda 767**	D	**77**
17	**GTP**	**201**	**(Japan) Mazdaspeed**	**(Japan) Takashi Yorino (Japan) Tetsuya Ota**	**Mazda 13J 2.6L 4-Rotor**	D	**77**
18	C1	6	(Switzerland) Repsol Brun Motorsport	(Switzerland) Walter Brun (Spain) Jesús Pareja	Porsche 962C	Y	77
18	C1	6	(Switzerland) Repsol Brun Motorsport	(Switzerland) Walter Brun (Spain) Jesús Pareja	Porsche Type-935 3.0L Turbo Flat-6	Y	77
19	C1	14	(United Kingdom) Richard Lloyd Racing	(United Kingdom) Tiff Needell (United Kingdom) Derek Bell	Porsche 962C GTi	G	76
19	C1	14	(United Kingdom) Richard Lloyd Racing	(United Kingdom) Tiff Needell (United Kingdom) Derek Bell	Porsche Type-935 3.0L Turbo Flat-6	G	76
20	C1	37	(Japan) Toyota Team Tom's	(United Kingdom) Geoff Lees (Japan) Johnny Dumfries	Toyota 89C-V	B	75
20	C1	37	(Japan) Toyota Team Tom's	(United Kingdom) Geoff Lees (Japan) Johnny Dumfries	Toyota R32V 3.2L Turbo V8	B	75
21	C1	85	(Japan) Nissan Motorsports International (Japan) Cabin Racing Team with Le Mans	(Japan) Takao Wada (Japan) Akio Morimoto	Nissan R88V	D	74
21	C1	85	(Japan) Nissan Motorsports International (Japan) Cabin Racing Team with Le Mans	(Japan) Takao Wada (Japan) Akio Morimoto	Nissan VG30 3.0L Turbo V6	D	74
22	C1	20	(United Kingdom) Team Davey	(United Kingdom) Tim Lee-Davey (Germany) Jürgen Barth	Porsche 962C	D	71
22	C1	20	(United Kingdom) Team Davey	(United Kingdom) Tim Lee-Davey (Germany) Jürgen Barth	Porsche Type-935 3.0L Turbo Flat-6	D	71
23	**C2**	**101**	**(United Kingdom) Chamberlain Engineering**	**(Spain) Fermín Velez (United Kingdom) Nick Adams**	**Spice SE86C**	G	**63**
23	**C2**	**101**	**(United Kingdom) Chamberlain Engineering**	**(Spain) Fermín Velez (United Kingdom) Nick Adams**	**Hart 418T 1.9L Turbo I4**	G	**63**
24	C1	50	(Japan) Toyota Team Tom's (Japan) SARD	(Austria) Roland Ratzenberger (Japan) Keiichi Suzuki	Toyota 89C-V	B	62
24	C1	50	(Japan) Toyota Team Tom's (Japan) SARD	(Austria) Roland Ratzenberger (Japan) Keiichi Suzuki	Toyota R32V 3.2L Turbo V8	B	62
25 DSQ^{†}	C2	108	(United Kingdom) Roy Baker Racing	(United Kingdom) John Sheldon (Sweden) Leif Lindström	Tiga GC289	G	47
25 DSQ^{†}	C2	108	(United Kingdom) Roy Baker Racing	(United Kingdom) John Sheldon (Sweden) Leif Lindström	Ford Cosworth DFL 3.3L V8	G	47
26 DNF	C1	1	(United Kingdom) Silk Cut Jaguar	(Netherlands) Jan Lammers (France) Patrick Tambay	Jaguar XJR-9	D	80
26 DNF	C1	1	(United Kingdom) Silk Cut Jaguar	(Netherlands) Jan Lammers (France) Patrick Tambay	Jaguar 7.0L V12	D	80
27 DNF	C1	22	(United Kingdom) Spice Engineering	(South Africa) Wayne Taylor (Denmark) Thorkild Thyrring	Spice SE89C	G	32
27 DNF	C1	22	(United Kingdom) Spice Engineering	(South Africa) Wayne Taylor (Denmark) Thorkild Thyrring	Ford Cosworth DFZ 3.5L V8	G	32
28 DNF	C1	5	(Switzerland) Repsol Brun Motorsport	(Norway) Harald Huysman (Finland) Juha Varjosaari	Porsche 962C	Y	23
28 DNF	C1	5	(Switzerland) Repsol Brun Motorsport	(Norway) Harald Huysman (Finland) Juha Varjosaari	Porsche Type-935 3.0L Turbo Flat-6	Y	23
29 DNF	C1	10	(West Germany) Porsche Kremer Racing	(Italy) Bruno Giacomelli (Italy) Giovanni Lavaggi	Porsche 962CK6	Y	16
29 DNF	C1	10	(West Germany) Porsche Kremer Racing	(Italy) Bruno Giacomelli (Italy) Giovanni Lavaggi	Porsche Type-935 3.0L Turbo Flat-6	Y	16
30 DNF	C1	8	(West Germany) Joest Racing	(France) Jean-Louis Ricci (France) Claude Ballot-Léna	Porsche 962C	G	15
30 DNF	C1	8	(West Germany) Joest Racing	(France) Jean-Louis Ricci (France) Claude Ballot-Léna	Porsche Type-935 3.0L Turbo Flat-6	G	15
31 DNF	C2	107	(United Kingdom) Tiga Racing Team	(Finland) Jari Nurminen (Italy) Luigi Taverna	Tiga GC289	G	11
31 DNF	C2	107	(United Kingdom) Tiga Racing Team	(Finland) Jari Nurminen (Italy) Luigi Taverna	Ford Cosworth DFL 3.3L V8	G	11
32 DNF	C1	21	(United Kingdom) Spice Engineering	(Chile) Eliseo Salazar (United Kingdom) Ray Bellm	Spice SE89C	G	5
32 DNF	C1	21	(United Kingdom) Spice Engineering	(Chile) Eliseo Salazar (United Kingdom) Ray Bellm	Ford Cosworth DFZ 3.5L V8	G	5
33 DNF	GTP	202	(Japan) Mazdaspeed	(Japan) Yoshimi Katayama (Japan) Yojiro Terada	Mazda 767B	D	4
33 DNF	GTP	202	(Japan) Mazdaspeed	(Japan) Yoshimi Katayama (Japan) Yojiro Terada	Mazda 13J 2.6L 4-Rotor	D	4
34 DNF	C2	103	France Prototeam	(Italy) Almo Coppelli (Switzerland) Bernard Thuner	Spice SE88C	G	3
34 DNF	C2	103	France Prototeam	(Italy) Almo Coppelli (Switzerland) Bernard Thuner	Ford Cosworth DFL 3.3L V8	G	3
DNS	C1	26	France Prototeam	(France) Alain Ferté (France) Henri Pescarolo	Spice SE88C	G	-
DNS	C1	26	France Prototeam	(France) Alain Ferté (France) Henri Pescarolo	Ford Cosworth DFZ 3.5L V8	G	-
DNQ	C1	29	(Italy) Mussato Action Car	(Italy) Franco Scapini (Italy) Gianfranco Tacchino	Lancia LC2	D	-
DNQ	C1	29	(Italy) Mussato Action Car	(Italy) Franco Scapini (Italy) Gianfranco Tacchino	Ferrari 308C 3.0L Turbo V8	D	-

† - The #108 Roy Baker Racing entry was disqualified after the race for receiving assistance at the race start.

== Statistics ==
- Pole position - #37 Toyota Team Tom's - 1:50.635
- Fastest lap - #1 Silk Cut Jaguar - 1:57.549
- Average speed - 170.596 km/h

World Sportscar Championship
Previous race: None	1989 season	Next race: 1989 480 km of Dijon
