= Bruno Sotty =

French racing driver (born 1949)

Bruno Sotty (born 1 November 1949 in Chablis) is a French former racing driver.
