= Robbie Stirling =

Canadian racing driver (born 1960)

Robbie Stirling (born 7 September 1960) is a Canadian former racing driver.

== Racing record ==
=== Complete British Touring Car Championship results ===
(key) (Races in bold indicate pole position in class) (Races in italics indicate fastest lap in class - 1 point awarded 1987-1989 all races)

Year	Team	Car	Class	1	2	3	4	5	6	7	8	9	10	11	12	13	DC	Pts	Class
1990	Arquati Racing Team	BMW M3	B	OUL	DON ovr:11‡ cls:6‡	THR	SIL	OUL	SIL	BRH	SNE	BRH	BIR	DON	THR	SIL	**NC‡**	**0**	**NC‡**

‡ Endurance driver – not eligible for points.
