= Jürgen Lässig =

German racing driver

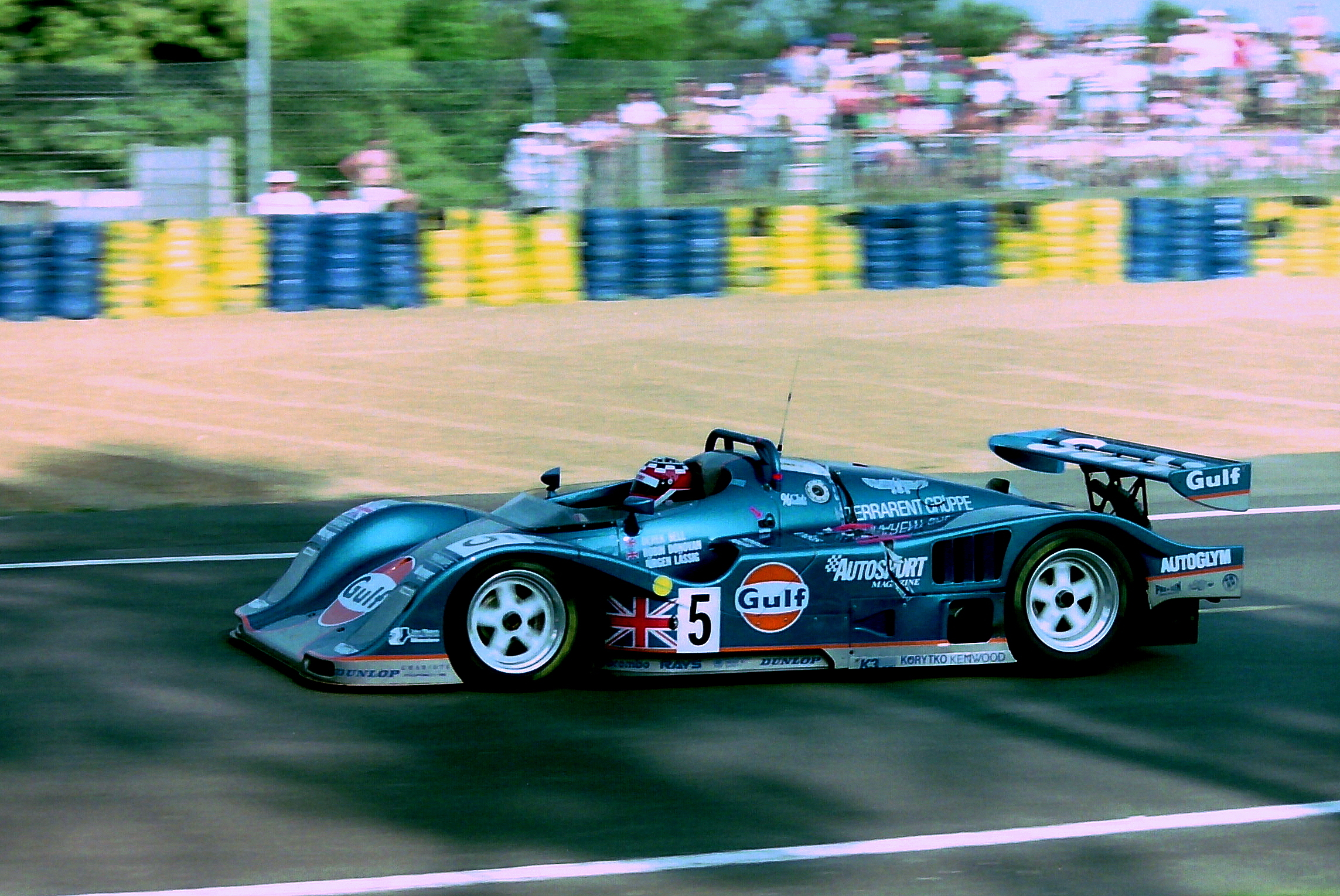
- Born: February 25, 1943; Tuttlingen, Germany
- Died: February 17, 2022 (aged 78); Tuttlingen, Germany
- Occupation: racing driver

Jürgen Lässig (February 25, 1943 – February 17, 2022) was a German racing driver.

Lässig began competing in endurance sports car racing, often World Sportscar Championship races in the early 1980s for Obermaier Racing and drove in several 24 Hours of Le Mans races. He and the Kremer Racing team were the winners of the 1995 24 Hours of Daytona. He retired after the 1997 24 Hours of Le Mans driving for Kremer.

== Career ==
Lässig made 16 starts in the 24 Hours of Le Mans, including 15 consecutive appearances from 1983-97, being the second German driver in history, behind Hans-Joachim Stuck, who made 19 starts. Lässig achieved seven top-ten finishes, with a best finish of second in 1987, partnered with Frenchman Pierre Yver and Bernard de Dryver of Belgium, in a Primagaz Porsche 962C, just behind the works Porsche 962C driven by Stuck with Al Holbert and Derek Bell. Yver and Lässig raced together during the following five editions of the Le Mans event, taking another podium finish in 1992, third place overall in a Porsche 962C entered by Obermaier Racing, with Otto Altenbach as third driver.

== 24 Hours of Le Mans results ==
Year	Team	Co-Drivers	Car	Class	Laps	Pos.	Class Pos.
1981	(West Germany) Weralit Racing Team	(West Germany) Edgar Dören (West Germany) Gerhard Holup	Porsche 935 K3	Gr.5	48	DNF	DNF
1983	(West Germany) Obermaier Racing	(West Germany) Axel Plankenhorn (South Africa) Desiré Wilson	Porsche 956	Gr.C	347	7th	7th
1984	(West Germany) Obermaier Racing	(South Africa) George Fouché (Canada) John Graham	Porsche 956	Gr.C1	147	DNF	DNF
1985	(West Germany) Obermaier Racing	(Spain) Jesús Pareja (Belgium) Hervé Regout	Porsche 956	Gr.C1	357	7th	7th
1986	(West Germany) Obermaier Racing	(Italy) Fulvio Ballabio (United Kingdom) Dudley Wood	Porsche 956	Gr.C1	345	5th	5th
1987	(France) Primagaz Competition	(France) Pierre Yver (Belgium) Bernard de Dryver	Porsche 962C	Gr.C1	335	2nd	2nd
1988	(France) Primagaz Competition	(France) Pierre Yver (United Kingdom) Dudley Wood	Porsche 962C	Gr.C1	356	11th	11th
1989	(Germany) Obermaier Racing (France) Primagaz Competition	(France) Pierre Yver (France) Paul Belmondo	Porsche 962C	Gr.C1	61	DNF	DNF
1990	(Germany) Obermaier Racing	(France) Pierre Yver (Germany) Otto Altenbach	Porsche 962C	Gr.C1	341	9th	9th
1991	(Switzerland) Team Salamin Primagaz (Germany) Obermaier Racing	(France) Pierre Yver (Germany) Otto Altenbach	Porsche 962C	Cat.2	232	DNF	DNF
1992	(Germany) Obermaier Racing GmbH	(France) Pierre Yver (Germany) Otto Altenbach	Porsche 962C	Cat.3	297	10th	3rd
1993	(Germany) Porsche Kremer Racing	(Italy) Giovanni Lavaggi (South Africa) Wayne Taylor	Porsche 962CK6	Cat.2	328	12th	7th
1994	(Germany) Porsche Kremer Racing	(United Kingdom) Derek Bell (United Kingdom) Robin Donovan	Kremer K8 Spyder	LMP1-C90	312	6th	4th
1995	(Germany) Porsche Kremer Racing	(Austria) Franz Konrad (Brazil) Antonio Herrmann de Azevedo	Kremer K8 Spyder	WSC	163	DNF	DNF
1996	(Germany) Porsche Kremer Racing	(France) Christophe Bouchut (Finland) Harri Toivonen	Kremer K8 Spyder	LMP1	110	DNF	DNF
1997	(Germany) Porsche Kremer Racing	(Spain) Tomás Saldaña (Sweden) Carl Rosenblad	Kremer K8 Spyder	LMP1	103	DNF	DNF
