= John Sheldon (racing driver) =

British racing driver (born 1946)

John Sheldon (born 2 December 1946) is a British former racing driver. He had a massive crash at Le Mans 1984, he crashed at nearly 200 mph, the fire from the impact was so large that it set some of the nearby forest on fire. The car was destroyed. Sheldon had burns to his hands and left side but a marshall died in the incident.
