= James Shead =

British racing driver (born 1965)

- Nationality: (United Kingdom) British
- Born: 19 August 1965 (age 61) Walton-on-Thames, Surrey, England

British Touring Car Championship
- Years active: 1988, 1990
- Teams: John Maguire Racing; Hawaiian Tropic
- Starts: 10
- Wins: 0 (4 in class)
- Poles: 0 (7 in class)
- Fastest laps: 0 (4 in class)
- Best finish: 8th in 1988

Championship titles
- 1988: British Touring Car Championship - Class C

James Shead (born 19 August 1965) is a British racing driver. His father, Don was also a racing driver.

In 1988, Shead won class C in the British Touring Car Championship. He finished eighth overall in the championship in a Volkswagen Golf GTI. In the 1990 24 Hours of Le Mans, he finished third in class C2 and 25th overall for Team Mako alongside Robbie Stirling and Ross Hyett.

== Racing record ==
=== Complete British Touring Car Championship results ===
(key) (Races in bold indicate pole position in class) (Races in italics indicate fastest lap in class - 1 point awarded 1987-1989 all races)

Year	Team	Car	Class	1	2	3	4	5	6	7	8	9	10	11	12	13	DC	Pts	Class
1988	John Maguire Racing	Volkswagen Golf GTI	C	**SIL**; DNS	OUL	**THR** ovr:13 cls:1	DON ovr:19 cls:1	**THR** ovr:18 cls:2	**SIL** ovr:18 cls:1	**SIL** ovr:14 cls:2	BRH ovr:16 cls:2	**SNE** ovr:16 cls:2	BRH; DNS	BIR; C	**DON** ovr:19 cls:1	SIL ovr:15 cls:2	8th	31	**1st**
1990	Hawaiian Tropic	Ford Sierra Sapphire	B	OUL	DON; Ret‡	THR	SIL	OUL	SIL	BRH	SNE	BRH	BIR	DON	THR	SIL	NC	0	NC

‡ Endurance driver.
