= Obermaier Racing =

German vehicle racing team

(Germany) Obermaier Racing (Germany) Oberbayern Motorsport
- Founded: 1983
- Founder(s): Hans Obermaier; Jürgen Lässig
- Base: Halsbach, Bavaria, Germany
- Team principal(s): Otto Altenbach
- Former series: Deutsche Rennsport Meisterschaft; Interserie; World Sportscar Championship; Deutsche Tourenwagen Meisterschaft; Porsche Carrera Cup Germany; Porsche Supercup; BPR Global GT Series
- Teams' Championships: 1995 Carrera Cup Germany; 1996 Porsche Supercup
- Drivers' Championships: 1995 Carrera Cup Germany (Harald Grohs)

Obermaier-Racing GmbH was a German auto racing team and tuning garage founded by Hans Obermaier and Jürgen Lässig. Specializing in Porsches for much of their history, the team competed at the top level of the World Sportscar Championship from 1983 until 1990 before finding success in the various incarnations of the Porsche Carrera Cup. The team was later known as Oberbayern Motorsport before their auto racing activities ceased in 2000.

== History ==
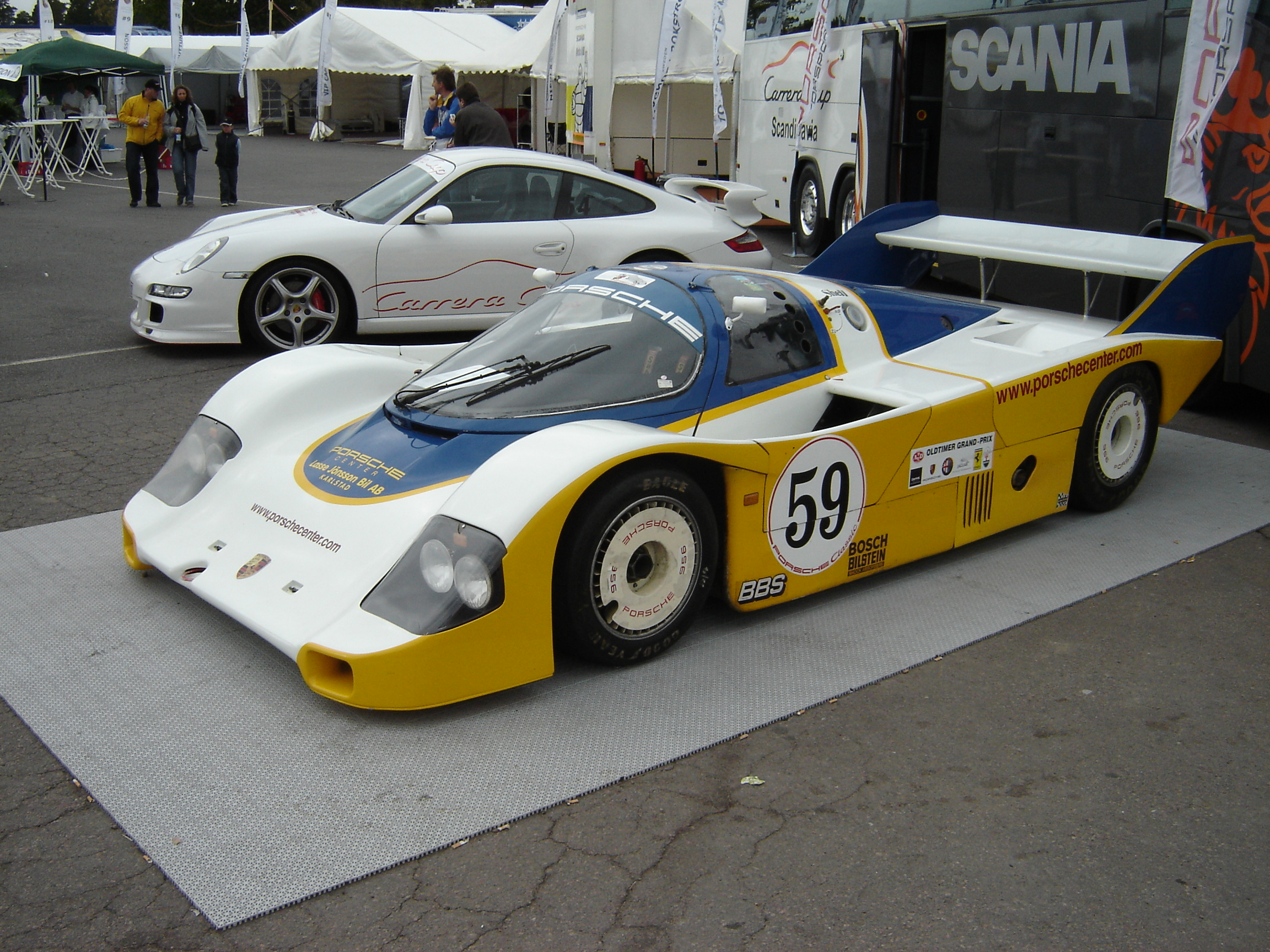
A former Obermaier Racing Porsche 956 on display

Johann Obermaier started his small engine repair company in Halsbach in 1933. A takeover of the Allgaier tractor repair shop in 1952 brought Obermaier their first experience with Porsches through their tractor business. As agriculture sales started to diminish in the 1960s, the company moved to automotive repairs until Johann died in 1967. Hans took over the company, eventually specializing in Porsche automotive repairs by the early 1970s while still working with agricultural equipment. The move into motorsports began in 1978, as the business was able to cover the cost of racing endeavors of Hans Obermaier with a Porsche Carrera RS and later Porsche 934. Obermaier had early amateur success, including winning a four-hour race at the Nürburgring and aiding the development of a rallying Porsche for Walter Röhrl but became frustrated with Porsche. Instead, a former factory BMW M1 was purchased for the Deutsche Rennsport Meisterschaft (DRM) in 1980 for driver Jürgen Lässig, achieving mixed success over the following years.

The pair formally created Obermaier Racing in 1983 following the purchase of a Porsche 956 with funding from sponsor Hugo Boss, setting their sights on international motorsport with the Interserie and European Sportscar Championship with their new Porsche. Lässig with co-driver Axel Plankenhorn completed the European Endurance Championship for Drivers in seventh place, finishing all races during the season. Belgian Hervé Regout became Lassig's new teammate for the World Sportscar Championship from 1984 onward before later being joined by Spaniard Jesús Pareja, earning consistent top-ten finishes over the years. During this time, Obermaier also made an entry in the Deutsche Tourenwagen Meisterschaft (DTM) with a BMW 635 CSi for Harald Grohs, finishing third in the championship in 1984 and 1985.

Obermaier upgrade to a new Porsche 962C in 1987 as well as new sponsorship from French company Primagaz brought by new driver Pierre Yver. The highlight of the year was a second-place finish at the 24 Hours of Le Mans, one of only 14 cars to complete the race duration. Meanwhile, Grohs competed in Porsche's new 944 Turbo Cup series, finishing in third place in 1986 and 1988. Lässig and Yver returned for a full World Championship campaign in 1989 but earned no points over the season. Otto Altenbach joined the team as a driver and team principal in 1990, purchasing a second 962C for the team but the season was yet again fruitless. Obermaier partnered with Antoine Salamin's eponymous team for the 1991 campaign with the best finish of fourth at the Nürburgring for Altenbach and Jürgen Oppermann.

The team rounded out their 962 era with two final appearances at Le Mans in 1992 and 1993 with a seventh-place finish in latter event. The team instead concentrated on the new Porsche Supercup series starting in 1993, although international sports car racing was kept alive by appearances in the BPR Global GT Series with Porsche 911 Turbos as well as a joint effort with a Ferrari F40 at Le Mans in 1994. Obermaier continued to rank in the top five in the Porsche Supercup and Carrera Cup Germany championships, including winning the Supercup teams championship in 1996, until Hans Obermaier ended racing activities in 2000, concentrating instead on motorsport and automotive repairs and restorations.
