= 1988 1000 km of Nürburgring =

Sports car endurance race in Germany

Nürburgring (1984–1994)

The 1988 ADAC 1000 km Nürburgring was the eighth round of the 1988 World Sportscar Championship season. It took place at the Nürburgring, West Germany on September 3 and 4, 1988.

== Pre-race ==
Prior to the race weekend, the Allgemeiner Deutscher Automobil-Club (ADAC), organisers of the event, decided to alter the schedule for the race weekend as well as the format of the race itself.

Rather than being a continual six hour event, the race was broken into two heats. The first heat was to be run on Saturday evening, going from dusk into darkness, and running for three hours of 500 kilometres, whichever was achieved first. The second heat would then be run on Sunday afternoon for an equal distance to make up the 1000 kilometre total distance. The times from each entry would be combined from the two events in order to determine an overall winner.

Several teams and drivers protested this change, in part due to the rain and fog present on the race weekend. All teams however did race any way.

== Official results ==
These results show the combined times from both heats. Class winners in bold. Cars failing to complete 75% of the winner's distance marked as Not Classified (NC).

Pos	Class	No	Team	Drivers	Chassis	Tyre	Laps
Pos	Class	No	Team	Drivers	Engine	Tyre	Laps
1	**C1**	**61**	**(Switzerland) Team Sauber Mercedes**	**(France) Jean-Louis Schlesser (West Germany) Jochen Mass**	**Sauber C9**	**MI**	**200**
1	**C1**	**61**	**(Switzerland) Team Sauber Mercedes**	**(France) Jean-Louis Schlesser (West Germany) Jochen Mass**	**Mercedes-Benz M117 5.0L Turbo V8**	**MI**	**200**
2	C1	1	(United Kingdom) Silk Cut Jaguar	(United Kingdom) Martin Brundle (United States) Eddie Cheever	Jaguar XJR-9	**D**	199
2	C1	1	(United Kingdom) Silk Cut Jaguar	(United Kingdom) Martin Brundle (United States) Eddie Cheever	Jaguar 7.0L V12	**D**	199
3	C1	7	(West Germany) Joest Racing	(Italy) Paolo Barilla (France) Bob Wollek	Porsche 962C	**G**	196
3	C1	7	(West Germany) Joest Racing	(Italy) Paolo Barilla (France) Bob Wollek	Porsche Type-935 3.0L Turbo Flat-6	**G**	196
4	C1	8	(West Germany) Joest Racing	(West Germany) Frank Jelinski (West Germany) "John Winter"	Porsche 962C	**G**	194
4	C1	8	(West Germany) Joest Racing	(West Germany) Frank Jelinski (West Germany) "John Winter"	Porsche Type-935 3.0L Turbo Flat-6	**G**	194
5	C1	6	(Switzerland) Brun Motorsport	(West Germany) Manuel Reuter (Spain) Jesús Pareja	Porsche 962C	**MI**	193
5	C1	6	(Switzerland) Brun Motorsport	(West Germany) Manuel Reuter (Spain) Jesús Pareja	Porsche Type-935 3.0L Turbo Flat-6	**MI**	193
6	C1	4	(Switzerland) Brun Motorsport	(Switzerland) Walter Brun (Norway) Harald Huysman	Porsche 962C	**MI**	192
6	C1	4	(Switzerland) Brun Motorsport	(Switzerland) Walter Brun (Norway) Harald Huysman	Porsche Type-935 3.0L Turbo Flat-6	**MI**	192
7	C1	14	(United Kingdom) Richard Lloyd Racing	(United Kingdom) Martin Donnelly (United Kingdom) David Hobbs	Porsche 962C GTi	**G**	191
7	C1	14	(United Kingdom) Richard Lloyd Racing	(United Kingdom) Martin Donnelly (United Kingdom) David Hobbs	Porsche Type-935 3.0L Turbo Flat-6	**G**	191
8	C1	2	(United Kingdom) Silk Cut Jaguar	(Netherlands) Jan Lammers (United Kingdom) Johnny Dumfries	Jaguar XJR-9	**D**	186
8	C1	2	(United Kingdom) Silk Cut Jaguar	(Netherlands) Jan Lammers (United Kingdom) Johnny Dumfries	Jaguar 7.0L V12	**D**	186
9	C1	40	(Switzerland) Swiss Team Salamin	(Switzerland) Antoine Salamin (Italy) Giovanni Lavaggi	Porsche 962C	**G**	182
9	C1	40	(Switzerland) Swiss Team Salamin	(Switzerland) Antoine Salamin (Italy) Giovanni Lavaggi	Porsche Type-935 3.0L Turbo Flat-6	**G**	182
10	C1	10	(West Germany) Porsche Kremer Racing	(West Germany) Volker Weidler (Italy) Bruno Giacomelli	Porsche 962CK6	**Y**	181
10	C1	10	(West Germany) Porsche Kremer Racing	(West Germany) Volker Weidler (Italy) Bruno Giacomelli	Porsche Type-935 3.0L Turbo Flat-6	**Y**	181
11	C1	5	(Switzerland) Brun Motorsport	(West Germany) Uwe Schäfer (Argentina) Oscar Larrauri	Porsche 962C	**MI**	180
11	C1	5	(Switzerland) Brun Motorsport	(West Germany) Uwe Schäfer (Argentina) Oscar Larrauri	Porsche Type-935 3.0L Turbo Flat-6	**MI**	180
12	**C2**	**106**	**(Italy) Kelmar Racing**	**(Italy) Pasquale Barberio (Italy) Vito Veninata**	**Tiga GC288**	**A**	**176**
12	**C2**	**106**	**(Italy) Kelmar Racing**	**(Italy) Pasquale Barberio (Italy) Vito Veninata**	**Ford Cosworth DFL 3.3L V8**	**A**	**176**
13	C2	103	(United Kingdom) Spice Engineering	(Italy) Almo Coppelli (Denmark) Thorkild Thyrring	Spice SE88C	**G**	175
13	C2	103	(United Kingdom) Spice Engineering	(Italy) Almo Coppelli (Denmark) Thorkild Thyrring	Ford Cosworth DFL 3.3L V8	**G**	175
14	C2	127	(United Kingdom) Chamberlain Engineering	(United Kingdom) John Williams (United Kingdom) Nick Adams (United Kingdom) Richard Jones	Spice SE86C	**A**	173
14	C2	127	(United Kingdom) Chamberlain Engineering	(United Kingdom) John Williams (United Kingdom) Nick Adams (United Kingdom) Richard Jones	Hart 418T 1.8L Turbo I4	**A**	173
15	C2	191	(United Kingdom) PC Automotive	(United Kingdom) Richard Piper (United States) Olindo Iacobelli	Argo JM19C	**G**	159
15	C2	191	(United Kingdom) PC Automotive	(United Kingdom) Richard Piper (United States) Olindo Iacobelli	Ford Cosworth DFL 3.3L V8	**G**	159
16	C2	121	(United Kingdom) GP Motorsport	(South Africa) Wayne Taylor (Greece) Costas Los	Spice SE87C	**G**	158
16	C2	121	(United Kingdom) GP Motorsport	(South Africa) Wayne Taylor (Greece) Costas Los	Ford Cosworth DFL 3.3L V8	**G**	158
17 NC	C2	198	(United Kingdom) Roy Baker Racing	(United Kingdom) John Sheldon (Australia) Neil Crang	Tiga GC286	**G**	137
17 NC	C2	198	(United Kingdom) Roy Baker Racing	(United Kingdom) John Sheldon (Australia) Neil Crang	Ford Cosworth DFL 3.3L V8	**G**	137
18 DNF	C2	109	(Italy) Kelmar Racing	(Italy) Ranieri Randaccio (Italy) Maurizio Gellini	Tiga GC288	**A**	137
18 DNF	C2	109	(Italy) Kelmar Racing	(Italy) Ranieri Randaccio (Italy) Maurizio Gellini	Ford Cosworth DFL 3.3L V8	**A**	137
19 DNF	C2	177	(France) Automobiles Louis Descartes	(France) Gérard Tremblay (France) Louis Descartes (France) Dominique Lacaud	ALD C2	**A**	126
19 DNF	C2	177	(France) Automobiles Louis Descartes	(France) Gérard Tremblay (France) Louis Descartes (France) Dominique Lacaud	BMW M80 3.5L I6	**A**	126
20 DNF	C2	124	(France) MT Sport Racing	(France) Pierre-François Rousselot (France) Jean Messaoudi	Argo JM19C	**A**	125
20 DNF	C2	124	(France) MT Sport Racing	(France) Pierre-François Rousselot (France) Jean Messaoudi	Ford Cosworth DFL 3.3L V8	**A**	125
21 DNF	C1	20	(United Kingdom) Team Davey	(United Kingdom) Tim Lee-Davey (United Kingdom) Tom Dodd-Noble (West Germany) Peter Oberndofer	Porsche 962C	**D**	110
21 DNF	C1	20	(United Kingdom) Team Davey	(United Kingdom) Tim Lee-Davey (United Kingdom) Tom Dodd-Noble (West Germany) Peter Oberndofer	Porsche Type-935 3.0L Turbo Flat-6	**D**	110
22 DNF	C1	24	(Italy) Dollop Racing	(Italy) Paolo Giangrossi (Switzerland) Jean-Pierre Frey	Lancia LC2	**D**	99
22 DNF	C1	24	(Italy) Dollop Racing	(Italy) Paolo Giangrossi (Switzerland) Jean-Pierre Frey	Ferrari 308C 3.0L Turbo V8	**D**	99
23 DNF	C1	62	(Switzerland) Team Sauber Mercedes	(Italy) Mauro Baldi (Sweden) Stefan Johansson	Sauber C9	**MI**	89
23 DNF	C1	62	(Switzerland) Team Sauber Mercedes	(Italy) Mauro Baldi (Sweden) Stefan Johansson	Mercedes-Benz M117 5.0L Turbo V8	**MI**	89
24 DNF	C2	160	(West Germany) Günter Gebhardt Motorsport	(West Germany) Hellmut Mundas (West Germany) Stefan Neuberger (West Germany) Rudi Seher	Gebhardt JC873	?	89
24 DNF	C2	160	(West Germany) Günter Gebhardt Motorsport	(West Germany) Hellmut Mundas (West Germany) Stefan Neuberger (West Germany) Rudi Seher	Ford Cosworth DFL 3.3L V8	?	89
25 DNF	C2	117	(Norway) Team Lucky Strike Schanche	(Austria) "Pierre Chauvet" (United Kingdom) Robin Smith	Argo JM19C	**G**	86
25 DNF	C2	117	(Norway) Team Lucky Strike Schanche	(Austria) "Pierre Chauvet" (United Kingdom) Robin Smith	Ford Cosworth DFL 3.3L V8	**G**	86
26 DNF	C1	16	(West Germany) Dauer Racing	(West Germany) Jochen Dauer (Austria) Franz Konrad	Porsche 962C	**G**	84
26 DNF	C1	16	(West Germany) Dauer Racing	(West Germany) Jochen Dauer (Austria) Franz Konrad	Porsche Type-935 3.0L Turbo Flat-6	**G**	84
27 DNF	C2	183	(West Germany) Walter Maurer	(West Germany) Walter Maurer (West Germany) Helmut Gall (West Germany) Edgar Dören	Maurer Lotec C87	?	80
27 DNF	C2	183	(West Germany) Walter Maurer	(West Germany) Walter Maurer (West Germany) Helmut Gall (West Germany) Edgar Dören	BMW 2.0L Turbo I4	?	80
28 DNF	C2	111	(United Kingdom) Spice Engineering	(United Kingdom) Ray Bellm (United Kingdom) Gordon Spice	Spice SE88C	**G**	75
28 DNF	C2	111	(United Kingdom) Spice Engineering	(United Kingdom) Ray Bellm (United Kingdom) Gordon Spice	Ford Cosworth DFL 3.3L V8	**G**	75
29 DNF	C2	107	(United Kingdom) Chamberlain Engineering	(France) Claude Ballot-Léna (France) Jean-Louis Ricci	Spice SE88C	**A**	63
29 DNF	C2	107	(United Kingdom) Chamberlain Engineering	(France) Claude Ballot-Léna (France) Jean-Louis Ricci	Ford Cosworth DFL 3.3L V8	**A**	63
30 DNF	C2	151	(Switzerland) Pierre-Alain Lombardi	(Switzerland) Pierre-Alain Lombardi (France) Bruno Sotty	Spice SE86C	**A**	36
30 DNF	C2	151	(Switzerland) Pierre-Alain Lombardi	(Switzerland) Pierre-Alain Lombardi (France) Bruno Sotty	Ford Cosworth DFL 3.3L V8	**A**	36
DNQ	C2	182	(West Germany) Pero Racing	(West Germany) Peter Fritsch (West Germany) Dieter Heinzelmann	Argo JM19	?	-
DNQ	C2	182	(West Germany) Pero Racing	(West Germany) Peter Fritsch (West Germany) Dieter Heinzelmann	Porsche Type-935 2.8L Turbo Flat-6	?	-

== Statistics ==
- Pole Position - #61 Team Sauber Mercedes - 1:24.920
- Fastest Lap - #61 Team Sauber Mercedes - 1:28.550
- Average Speed - 154.359 km/h

World Sportscar Championship
Previous race: 1988 1000km of Brands Hatch	1988 season	Next race: 1988 1000km of Spa
