= Stefan Johansson =

Swedish racing driver (born 1956)

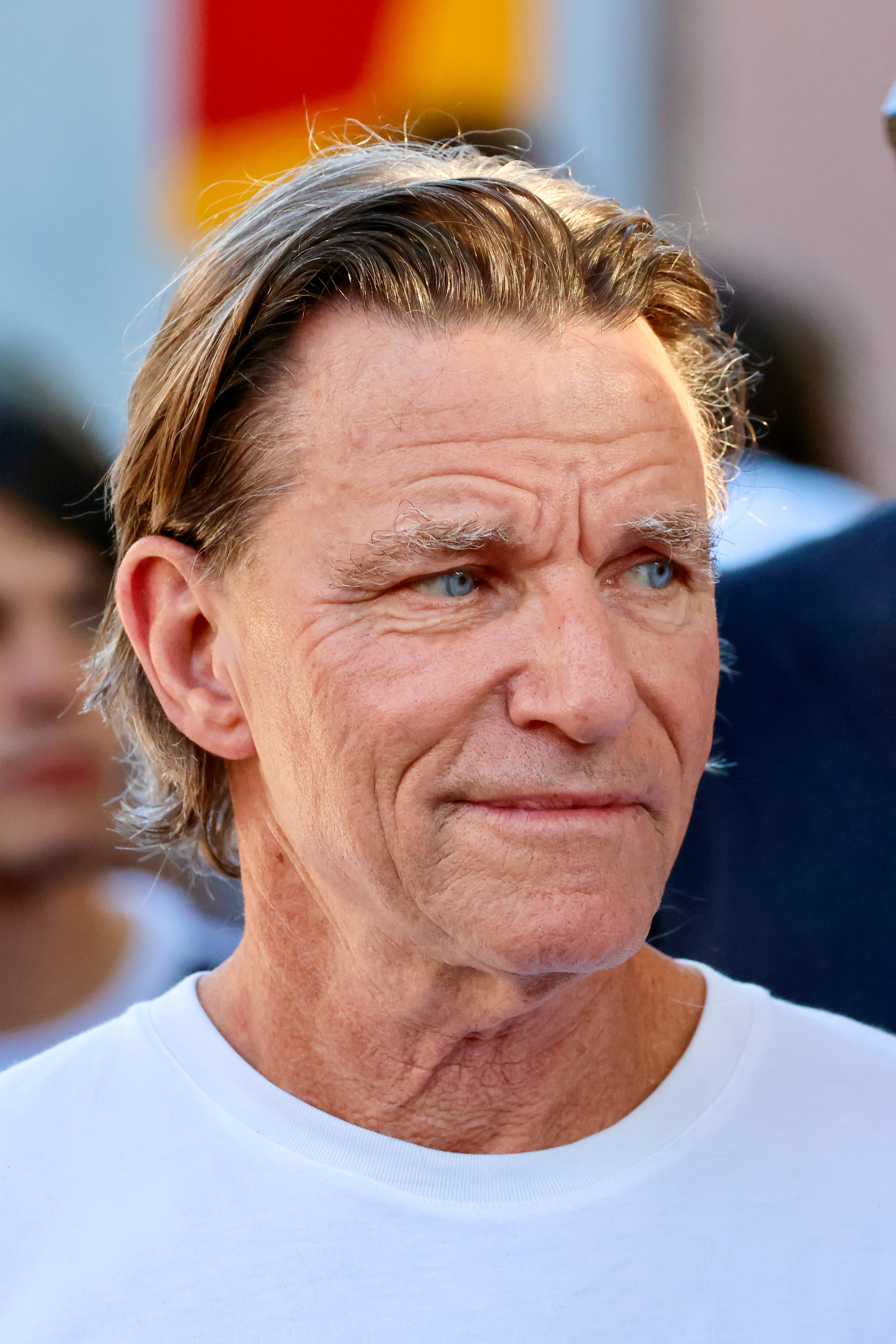
- Johansson at the 2026 Adelaide Motorsport Festival
- Born: Stefan Nils Edwin Johansson; 8 September 1956 (age 70); Växjö, Sweden

Formula One World Championship career
- Nationality: (Sweden) Swedish
- Active years: 1980, 1983–1991
- Team(s): Shadow, Spirit, Tyrrell, Toleman, Ferrari, McLaren, Ligier, Onyx, AGS, Footwork
- Entries: 103 (79 starts)
- Championships: 0
- Wins: 0
- Podiums: 12
- Career points: 88
- Pole positions: 0
- Fastest laps: 0
- First entry: 1980 Argentine Grand Prix
- Last entry: 1991 British Grand Prix

Champ Car career
- 74 races run over 5 years
- Years active: 1992–1996
- Team: Bettenhausen
- Best finish: 11th (1994)
- First race: 1992 Detroit Grand Prix (Detroit)
- Last race: 1996 Toyota Grand Prix of Monterey (Laguna Seca)
Wins	Podiums	Poles
0	4	0

24 Hours of Le Mans career
- Years: 1983–1984, 1990–1992, 1997–2001, 2003, 2006–2008, 2012
- Teams: Joest, Mazda, Trust, Porsche, Audi, Reynard, Champion, RfH, Arena, Courage, Epsilon Euskadi, Gulf
- Best finish: 1st (1997)
- Class wins: 3 (1992, 1997, 2003)

Previous series
- 2012; 1982–1992 (Note: The exact years Johansson competed in the World Sportscar Championship: 1982–1984, 1988, 1991–1992.); 1979–1982; 1978–1980: FIA WEC; World Sportscar; European Formula Two; British F3

Championship titles
- 1980: British F3

Awards
- 1992: IndyCar Rookie of the Year

Stefan Nils Edwin Johansson (born 8 September 1956) is a Swedish former racing driver and motorsport executive, who competed in Formula One between 1980 and 1991. (Note: The exact years Johansson competed in Formula One: 1980, 1983–1991.) In endurance racing, Johansson won the 24 Hours of Le Mans in 1997 with Joest.

Born and raised in Växjö, Johansson began his career in kart racing, winning the Swedish Championship in 1973. After achieving multiple national titles in Formula Ford, Johansson progressed to British Formula Three, winning the championship in 1980. Johansson also made his Formula One debut that year—at the Argentine Grand Prix with Shadow—but did not qualify for either round he contested. Following multiple race wins in European Formula Two and podiums in the World Sportscar Championship, Johansson returned to Formula One in 1983 with Spirit. After sporadic appearances for Tyrrell and Toleman in 1984, Johansson signed for Ferrari the following season, achieving his maiden podium finish in Canada. Retaining his seat for 1986, Johansson scored several podiums as he finished a career-best fifth in the World Drivers' Championship. Replaced by Gerhard Berger at Ferrari in 1987, Johansson moved to McLaren to partner Alain Prost; he scored five podiums on his way to sixth in the standings, but left for Ligier at the end of the season. After a non-classified championship finish in 1988, Johansson moved to Onyx, scoring the team's only podium finish at the 1989 Portuguese Grand Prix. He was dropped by Onyx after the 1990 Brazilian Grand Prix, making further appearances for AGS and Footwork in 1991 before leaving Formula One, having achieved 12 podiums.

In addition to his ten seasons in Formula One, Johansson entered 15 editions of the 24 Hours of Le Mans between 1983 and 2012, taking three class wins amongst an overall win in 1997, driving the Porsche WSC-95 alongside Michele Alboreto and Tom Kristensen. He also competed in the IndyCar World Series from 1992 to 1996, both seasons of Grand Prix Masters, and the inaugural season of the FIA World Endurance Championship.

== Early life and career ==
Stefan Nils Edwin Johansson was born on 8 September 1956 in Växjö, Sweden. Johansson began his career in kart racing, where he won the Swedish Championship in 1973. He then progressed to Formula Ford, winning the Swedish title in both 1977 and 1979.

Johansson competed in the British Formula Three Championship from 1978 to 1980, winning the series in his final year, driving for future McLaren chief executive Ron Dennis' Project Four team.

== Formula One career ==
In Formula One, Johansson participated in 103 Grands Prix, debuting on 13 January 1980 for the Shadow Racing Team at the 1980 Argentine Grand Prix when he was still a Formula Three regular. He failed to qualify for the race and the next race in Brazil and he was not seen in Formula One again until 1983, after spending 1982 in the European Formula Two Championship with Spirit Racing, where he finished eighth overall, his best finish being third at Mugello in Italy.

=== Spirit (1983) ===
Johansson's first Formula One race with Spirit was at the non-championship 1983 Race of Champions at Brands Hatch, where he failed to finish due to failure of the Honda engine on lap four. His qualifying time was almost 20 seconds off the pole time set by 1982 World Champion Keke Rosberg in his Williams-Cosworth, but his times in the race morning warm-up session were within a second of the Ferrari 126C2B of René Arnoux, who was fastest. He moved up to seventh place before pulling into the pits with another engine failure. Anecdotally, then-BBC commentator Murray Walker said on air that Spirit and Honda had completed thousands of miles of trouble-free testing until that point. Spirit continued to test and develop the 201C and Johansson re-entered Formula One at the 1983 British Grand Prix at Silverstone where he qualified the car in a credible 14th position. He raced in a further five Grands Prix in 1983, with a best finish of seventh in the Dutch Grand Prix at Zandvoort.

=== Tyrrell/Toleman (1984) ===
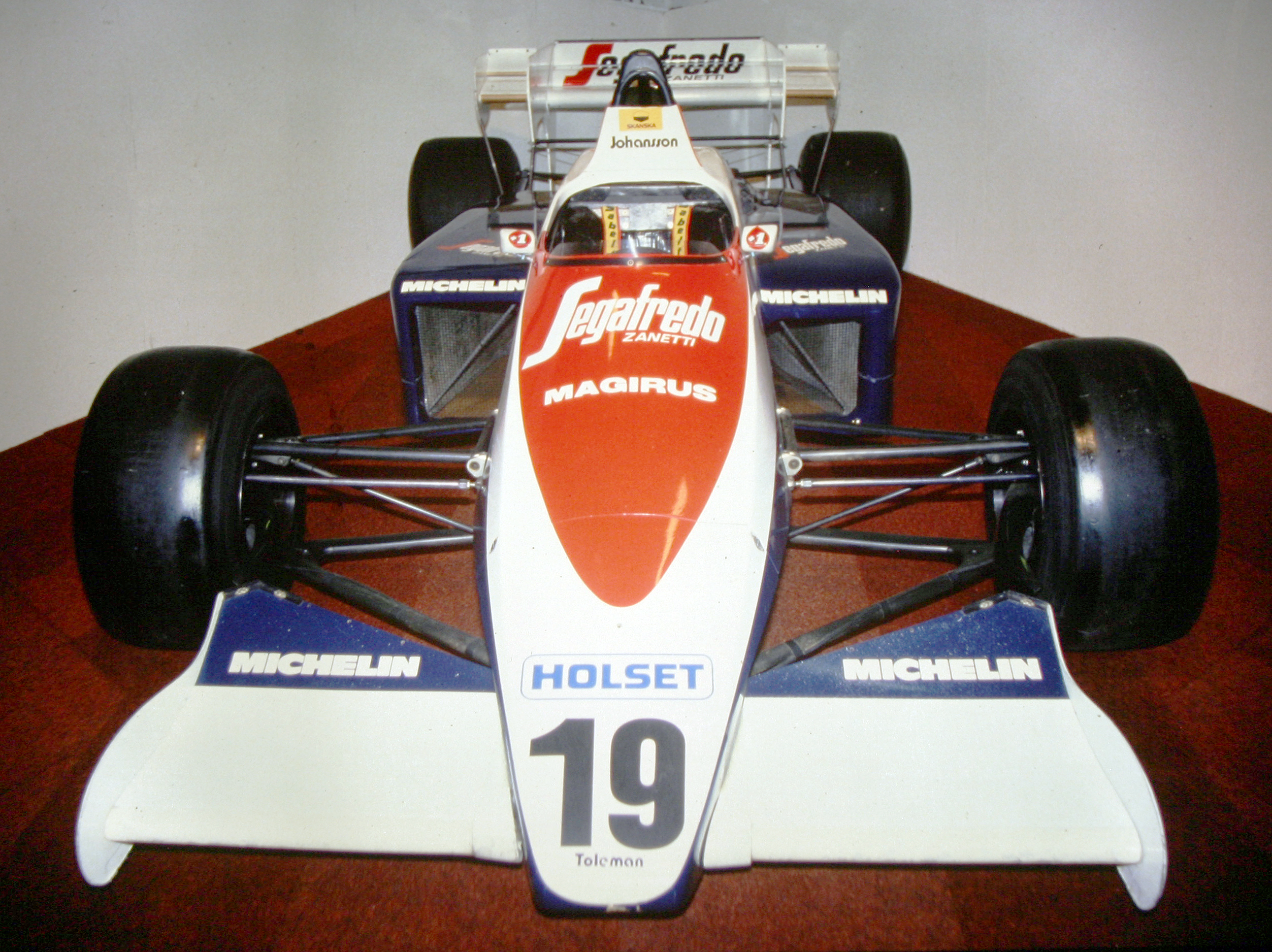
The Toleman TG184 raced by Johansson in 1984, at display at the Motor Exhibition in Malmö, Sweden in early 1985

Johansson was replaced at Spirit by Mauro Baldi for the 1984 season when the team lost its Honda engines to Williams and he didn't race until he joined Tyrrell in Round 10 of the championship, the British Grand Prix at Brands Hatch, as a replacement for the injured Martin Brundle. He then went on to drive for Toleman for the last few Grands Prix of the season in place of the injured Johnny Cecotto, finishing fourth in the Italian Grand Prix at Monza. While at Toleman, Johansson's regular teammate was future triple World Drivers' Champion Ayrton Senna.

=== Ferrari (1985–1986) ===
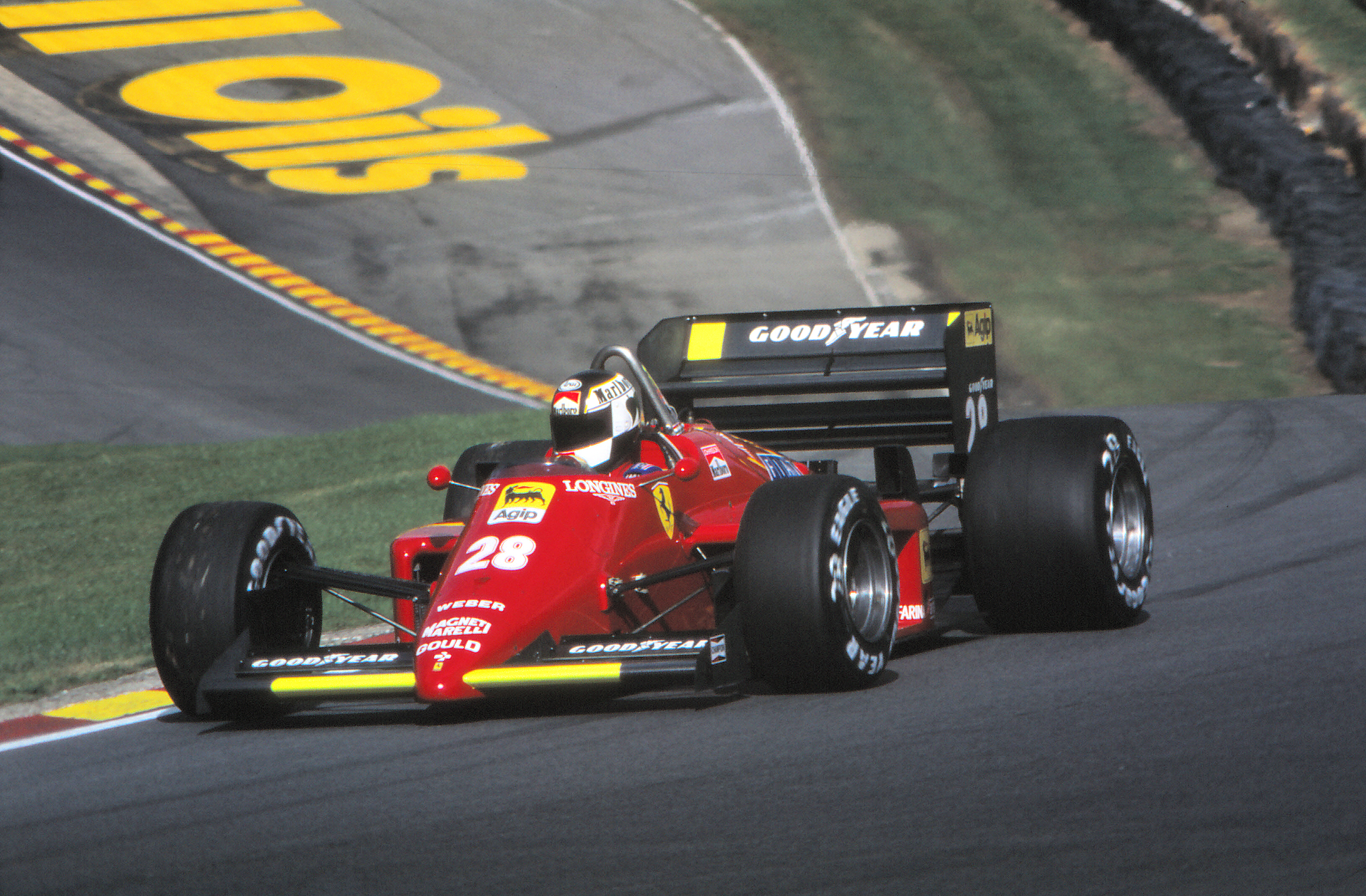
Johansson (Ferrari 156/85) during practice for the 1985 European Grand Prix

Johansson signed a contract with Toleman for 1985 but it fell through when Toleman failed to secure a tyre agreement. Instead Johansson started again with Tyrrell as a replacement for the suspended Stefan Bellof before being called up to Ferrari when René Arnoux was mysteriously sacked after the first race of the season in Brazil. At his second race with Ferrari, namely their 'home' race, the San Marino Grand Prix, two laps from home he passed Senna's out-of-fuel Lotus to take the lead to the delight of the Tifosi, and would probably have won if his Ferrari 156/85 had not run out of fuel itself just half a lap later. His role at Ferrari for the 1985 season was primarily to support Michele Alboreto's championship challenge, though he did finish second to the Italian at Canada, and backed it up with second in the next race at Detroit.

In 1986, Johansson often outpaced Alboreto, despite the Italian being the team's lead driver. The V6 turbo in the Ferrari F1/86 lacked nothing in power compared to the Honda, BMW, Renault and TAG-Porsche engines, but the car itself proved to be difficult, with both drivers complaining through the season about lack of downforce and the car's reluctance to drive well on all but the smoothest of circuits. Johansson finished fifth in the 1986 Drivers' Championship, his best-ever position, while Alboreto, who finished second in 1985, could only manage ninth place. There were many in Formula One, including highly respected then-BBC commentators Murray Walker and 1976 World Champion James Hunt, who believed that Ferrari were sacking the wrong driver, given that the Swede had generally outshone his more highly-paid teammate throughout the season.

=== McLaren (1987) ===
Johansson was replaced at Ferrari by Austrian Gerhard Berger for 1987 and he moved to McLaren as number two driver behind double and reigning World Champion Alain Prost. McLaren weren't as competitive in 1987 as they had been in 1984–1986, with Prost only adding three wins to his tally (and beating the record of 27 Grand Prix wins held by Jackie Stewart with his 28th win in Portugal) and failing to successfully defend his Drivers' Championship. Further podium finishes did follow for the Swede and Johansson finished sixth in the Drivers' Championship. Stefan Johansson's position at McLaren was considered by many as just a stop gap signing by team boss Ron Dennis who had failed to lure Ayrton Senna from Lotus due to him being under contract until the end of 1987 and always intended signing the Brazilian for 1988. Johansson famously finished the 1987 German Grand Prix on three wheels having had a puncture on the last lap. He also finished second behind Prost in Belgium and added further podium finishes in Brazil, Spain and Japan. Despite 11 podiums in three seasons, Johansson was still winless and was not wanted by a top team (he had hoped to join Williams in 1988 as a replacement for the departing Nelson Piquet but Williams signed Riccardo Patrese instead). He did return to McLaren in a test-driver capacity in 1990, testing the Honda V12 engine at Suzuka in Japan and helping with the development of a paddle shifter and a new gearbox.

=== Ligier (1988) ===
Johansson joined Ligier for 1988, ironically alongside the man he replaced at Ferrari, René Arnoux, but the team's first non-turbo powered car since 1983, the Michel Beaujon-designed JS31 powered by a naturally aspirated Judd V8 engine, was totally uncompetitive, scoring no points and often failed to qualify, even against teams with much smaller budgets such as AGS and Rial (the French team's low point of the year was when both Johansson and Arnoux failed to qualify for the French Grand Prix at Paul Ricard in the first weekend of July). Unfortunately for Johansson, he failed to come to grips with the JS31, recording six non-qualifications during the season (compared to Arnoux who only failed to qualify twice). He did record the car's two best finishes of the year though, ninth placings in the opening race of the season in Brazil and the last race in Australia.

=== Onyx/AGS/Footwork (1989–1991) ===
Better was to follow in 1989, as Johansson was signed to lead the new Onyx team. The car was temperamental and didn't always qualify, but Johansson finished a surprise and popular third in Portugal for his last (and the team's only) podium finish. He fell out with new team owner Peter Monteverdi in early 1990 and was duly sacked, making further appearances for AGS and Footwork in 1991.

Johansson's record of podium finishes without a win was equalled by Nick Heidfeld at the 2009 Malaysian Grand Prix, who then took the record outright at the 2011 Malaysian Grand Prix.

In his 11-year Formula One career, in which he drove for ten different teams at 103 Grands Prix, Johansson achieved 12 podiums and scored a total of 88 championship points.

== CART career ==
For 1992, Johansson moved over to CART Championship Car, winning the Rookie of the Year title with two third places, ahead of Belgium's Éric Bachelart. His first pole came at Portland the next year, but as in Formula One he never won a race. From 1992 to 1996, he started 73 races and had his best season overall in 1994, finishing in 11th. During this time, he competed in the 1993–1995 Indianapolis 500. At the 1996 Molson Indy Toronto race, he was involved in an accident that claimed the life of fellow driver Jeff Krosnoff and track marshal Gary Avrin. After making wheel to wheel contact, Krosnoff's car hit the barriers and also a tree and lamp post that was too close to the track. Krosnoff died instantly of the injuries sustained from hitting the lamp post.

== After Formula One: Sports Cars and team ownership ==
Before his Formula One career Johansson had participated in sports car races such as 24 Hours of Le Mans, and had won two World Sportscar Championship races in the 1980s (the Mugello round in 1983, driving a Joest Racing Porsche 956 with Bob Wollek, and the 1988 Spa Francorchamps race in a Sauber C9 with Mauro Baldi).

After retiring from CART at the end of the 1996 season, Johansson returned to this type of racing. During 1997 he recorded two major race wins, at the 12 Hours of Sebring driving a Ferrari 333 SP with Andy Evans, Fermín Vélez and Yannick Dalmas. Later in 1997 Johansson also won at Le Mans where he drove a TWR-Porsche WSC-95 for Joest Racing alongside his Ferrari F1 teammate of 1985 and 1986 Michele Alboreto, and young Dane Tom Kristensen. For Kristensen it was to be the first of a record (as of 2025) nine wins in the famous French classic.

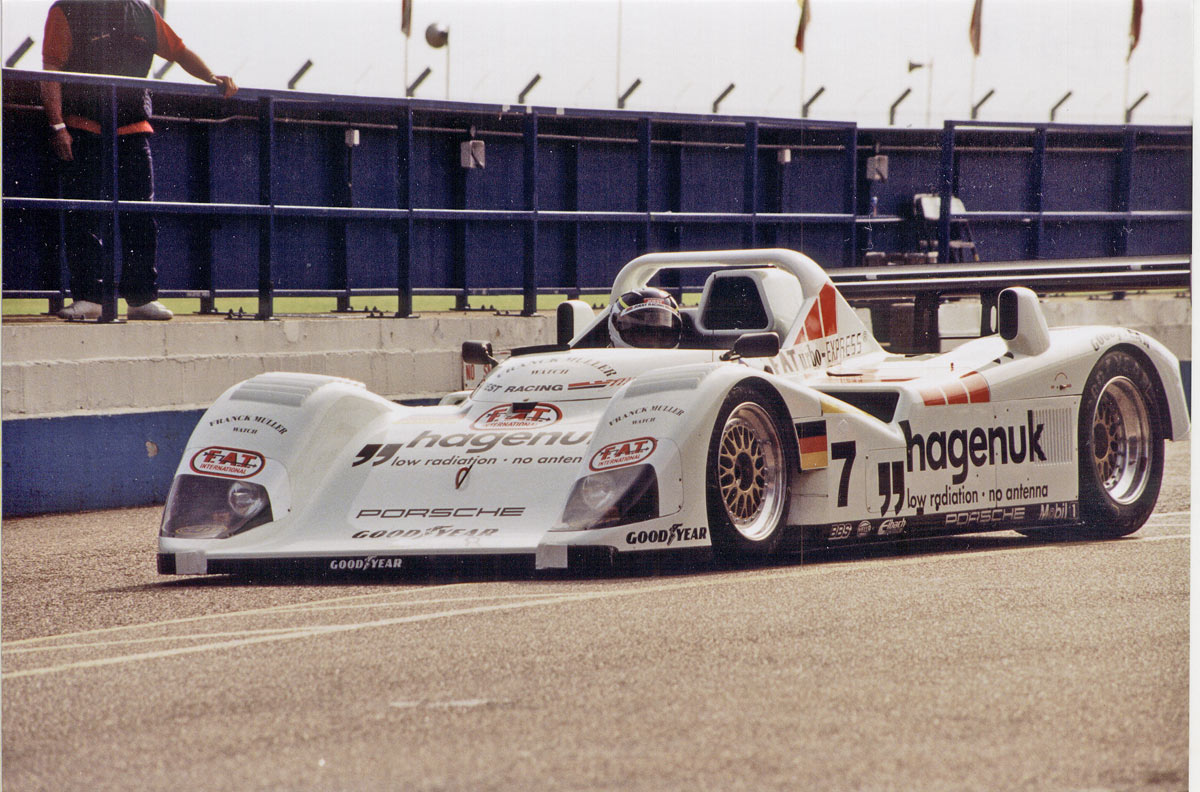
Johansson driving a Joest Porsche WSC-95 at Donington Park in 1997

In 1997, Johansson founded a successful Indy Lights team running Fredrik Larsson and Jeff Ward; in 1998 its drivers were Guy Smith and Luiz Garcia Jr.; for 1999 the seats went to Scott Dixon and Ben Collins.

During 1998 and 1999, Johansson raced for various sports car teams (like the unreliable Audi R8C Coupé at Le Mans) but in 2000 he started Johansson-Matthews racing with an American businessman called Jim Matthews. They competed in the American Le Mans Series using a Reynard 2KQ prototype. Unfortunately this wasn't a successful vehicle in its original form (though it was later developed into various other successful cars including the Zytek that he later raced) and the partnership dissolved.

In 2001, Johansson campaigned an Audi R8 prototype with backing from Gulf Oil and the assistance of Mike Earle's Arena team. That year, he raced in the European Le Mans Series, the American Le Mans Series and at Le Mans itself. His co-drivers were Guy Smith and Patrick Lemarie. At Le Mans Smith was replaced by Tom Coronel.

2002 saw Johansson back in an Audi R8 but this time one run by the Miami based Champion Racing team. His co-driver was ex Formula One driver Johnny Herbert and they competed in the American Le Mans Series.

For 2003, Johansson returned to CART as a team owner, running American Spirit Team Johansson with Jimmy Vasser and Ryan Hunter-Reay as drivers. This was one of many new teams for the 2003 CART season; ironically, Bachelart's Mi-Jack Conquest Racing team was another. The team was under-funded, and although Hunter-Reay scored a fluke win in the wet conditions at Australia, it folded at the end of the season.

After only competing in a couple of celebrity races and occasional outings in the works Zytek in 2004 Johansson returned to full-time racing in 2005 driving the Chip Ganassi run New Century Mortgage sponsored Lexus Riley Daytona Prototype in the American Grand-Am Rolex Sports Car Series. With co-driver Cort Wagner he scored his best finish, a second place, at Mont Tremblant in Canada, they finished the year in fifth place in the championship.

In 2006 as well as the Grand Prix Masters series, Johansson has made occasional appearances in Grand-Am for the Cheever and CITGO teams, and has continued an association with the works Zytek team in the Le Mans Series.

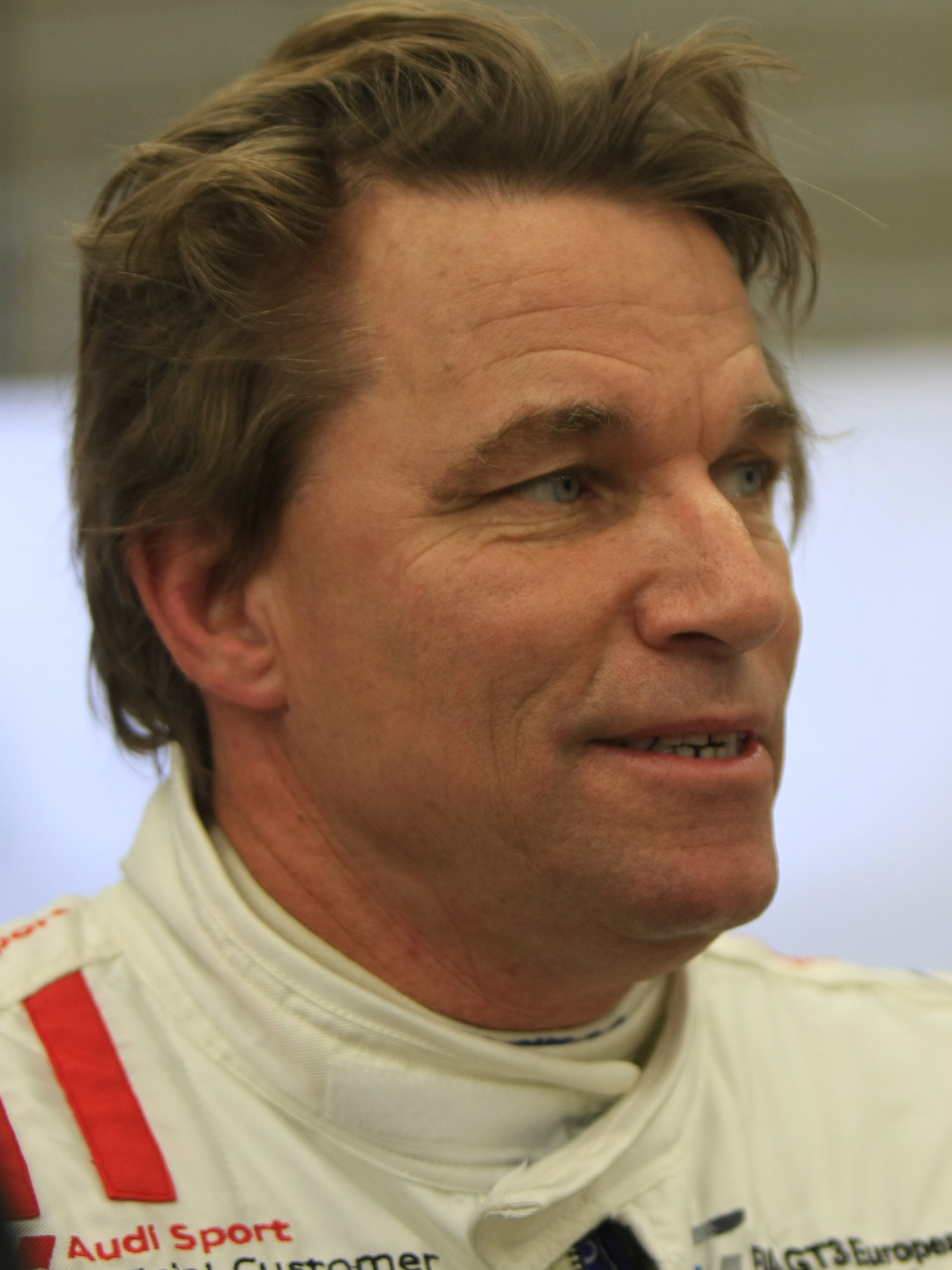
Johansson in 2011

2007 saw Johansson competing in a Highcroft Racing Courage-Acura in the LMP2 class of the American Le Mans Series, sharing with David Brabham. He was due to race a Zytek at Le Mans in 2007, but the team could not rebuild the car in time after a test-day accident, and Johansson made a last minute deal to drive a works Courage.

Johansson took part in the inaugural Speedcar Series in 2008, where luck once again deserted him as the victim of a lot of other drivers' accidents. For 2008 Johansson did not have a full-time sports car drive, but had some outings planned in the Highcroft Acura ARX-01 in the ALMS and a place with the Epsilon Euskadi team at Le Mans.

Outside the cockpit, Johansson has a number of business ventures (including managing several successful drivers such as Scott Dixon) and is a keen artist – he is particularly known for his watch designs. Also, Johansson does expert commentary on Viasat Motor during Formula One races on occasion.

In 2011, Johansson raced a Pescarolo-Judd in the Petit Le Mans 10 Hours and a Ford GT3 in the Malaysian 12 Hours at Sepang.

In 2012, Johansson returned to the 24 Hours of Le Mans, racing a Lola B12/80.

== Driver management ==
Johansson is the manager of several racing drivers, including New Zealander Scott Dixon, fellow Swede Felix Rosenqvist (winner of the 2026 Indianapolis 500), Canadian Zachary Claman DeMelo, Romain Grosjean and Ed Jones.

== In popular culture ==
Johansson was the inspiration for the song "Speedway at Nazareth" by Mark Knopfler.

== Career results ==
=== Career summary ===
Season	Series	Team	Races	Wins	Poles	F/Laps	Podiums	Points	Position
1978	British Formula Three	Anglia Cars Ltd	12	0	1	1	2	15	8th
1979	European Formula Two	Polifac BMW Junior Team	1	0	0	0	0	0	NC
1979	British Formula Three	Chevron Cars Ltd	18	0	2	3	7	54	4th
1979	British Formula Three	Derek McMahon Racing	3	1	0	1	1	54	4th
1980	Formula One	Shadow Cars	0	0	0	0	0	0	NC
1980	European Formula Two	ICI Roloil Racing Team	0	0	0	0	0	0	NC
1980	British Formula Three	Project Four Racing	20	6	10	5	13	97	**1st**
1981	European Formula Two	Docking Spitzley Team Toleman	12	2	0	0	3	30	4th
1981	Japanese Formula Two	Hachimonjiya Speed Box Team	1	0	0	0	0	30	5th
1981	Japanese Formula Two	Walter Wolf Racing Japan	1	0	0	0	0	30	5th
1981	Japanese Formula Two	Racing Mate Project Team	1	0	0	0	1	30	5th
1982	European Formula Two	Marlboro Team Spirit	13	0	5	0	1	11	8th
1982	Japanese Formula Two	Marlboro Team Spirit	2	0	1	0	2	27	7th
1982	World Sportscar Championship	BASF Cassetten Team GS Sport	1	0	0	0	0	0	NC
1983	Formula One	Spirit Racing	6	0	0	0	0	0	NC
1983	Japanese Formula Two	RACING MATE Uchida Racing	1	0	0	0	0	4	17th
1983	World Sportscar Championship	Sorga S.A.	5	0	0	0	2	36	11th
1983	World Sportscar Championship	Porsche Kremer Racing	1	0	0	0	0	36	11th
1983	24 Hours of Le Mans	Sorga S.A.	1	0	0	0	0	N/A	6th
1984	Formula One	Tyrrell Racing Organisation	3	0	0	0	0	3	17th
1984	Formula One	Toleman Group Motorsport	3	0	0	0	0	3	17th
1984	Japanese Formula Two	Advan Sports Nova	8	3	1	1	6	102 (108)	**2nd**
1984	World Sportscar Championship	New-Man Joest Racing	5	0	0	0	0	13	38th
1984	24 Hours of Le Mans	New-Man Joest Racing	1	0	0	0	0	N/A	DNF
1985	Formula One	Tyrrell Team	1	0	0	0	0	26	7th
1985	Formula One	Ferrari	15	0	0	0	2	26	7th
1986	Formula One	Ferrari	16	0	0	0	4	23	5th
1987	Formula One	Marlboro McLaren TAG Turbo	16	0	0	0	5	30	6th
1988	Formula One	Ligier Loto	10	0	0	0	0	0	NC
1988	World Sportscar Championship	Team Sauber Mercedes	3	1	0	0	2	55	19th
1988	World Sportscar Championship	Toyota Team Tom's	1	0	0	0	0	55	19th
1989	Formula One	Moneytron Onyx Formula One	8	0	0	0	1	6	12th
1990	Formula One	Monteverdi Onyx Formula One	0	0	0	0	0	0	NC
1990	24 Hours of Le Mans	Mazdaspeed	1	0	0	0	0	N/A	DNF
1991	Formula One	AGS	0	0	0	0	0	0	NC
1991	Formula One	Footwork Porsche	1	0	0	0	0	0	NC
1991	Formula One	Footwork Ford	1	0	0	0	0	0	NC
1991	World Sportscar Championship	Konrad Motorsport	4	0	0	0	0	6	39th
1991	World Sportscar Championship	Mazdaspeed	1	0	0	0	0	6	39th
1991	24 Hours of Le Mans	Konrad Motorsport	1	0	0	0	0	N/A	6th
1992	World Sportscar Championship	Euro Racing	1	0	0	0	0	0	NC
1992	World Sportscar Championship	Trust Racing Team	1	0	0	0	0	0	NC
1992	PPG Indy Car World Series	Bettenhausen Racing	9	0	0	0	2	47	14th
1992	24 Hours of Le Mans	Trust Racing Team	1	0	0	0	0	N/A	5th
1993	PPG Indy Car World Series	Bettenhausen Motorsports	16	0	0	0	1	43	13th
1994	PPG Indy Car World Series	Bettenhausen Motorsports	16	0	0	0	0	57	11th
1995	PPG Indy Car World Series	Bettenhausen Motorsports	17	0	0	0	1	60	13th
1996	PPG Indy Car World Series	Bettenhausen Racing	16	0	0	0	0	43	15th
1997	24 Hours of Le Mans	Joest Racing	1	1	0	0	1	N/A	**1st**
1998	24 Hours of Le Mans	Porsche AG	1	0	0	0	0	N/A	DNF
1999	24 Hours of Le Mans	Audi Sport UK Ltd.	1	0	0	0	0	N/A	DNF
2000	24 Hours of Le Mans	Johansson-Matthews Racing	1	0	0	0	0	N/A	DNF
2001	24 Hours of Le Mans	Johansson Motorsport	1	0	0	0	0	N/A	DNF
2003	24 Hours of Le Mans	Champion Racing	1	0	0	0	1	N/A	**3rd**
2006	24 Hours of Le Mans	Racing for Holland	1	0	0	0	0	N/A	DNF
2007	24 Hours of Le Mans	Courage Compétition	1	0	0	0	0	N/A	DNF
2007	24 Hours of Le Mans	Arena Motorsport	0	0	0	0	0	N/A	NC
2008	24 Hours of Le Mans	Epsilon Euskadi	1	0	0	0	0	N/A	DNF
2012	FIA World Endurance Championship	Gulf Racing Middle East	3	0	0	0	0	1.5	76th
2012	24 Hours of Le Mans	Gulf Racing Middle East	1	0	0	0	0	N/A	DNF

=== Complete European Formula Two Championship results ===
(key) (Races in bold indicate pole position; races in italics indicate fastest lap)

Year	Entrant	Chassis	Engine	1	2	3	4	5	6	7	8	9	10	11	12	13	Pos.	Pts
1979	Polifac BMW Junior Team	March 792	BMW	SIL	HOC	THR	NÜR	VLL	MUG	PAU	HOC	ZAN	PER	MIS	DON; Ret		NC	0
1980	ICI Roloil Racing Team	March 802	BMW	THR; DNS	HOC	NÜR	VLL	PAU	SIL	ZOL	MUG	ZAN	PER	MIS	HOC		NC	0
1981	Docking Spitzley Team Toleman	Lola T850	Hart	SIL; 9	HOC; 1	THR; 7	NÜR; 4	VLL; 2	MUG; Ret	PAU; 8	PER; Ret	SPA; 14	DON; 4	MIS; 9	MAN; 1		4th	30
1982	Marlboro Team Spirit	Spirit 201	Honda	**SIL**; Ret	HOC; Ret	**THR**; 14	NÜR; 6	**MUG**; 3	**VLL**; 4	PAU; 7	**SPA**; Ret	HOC; 4	DON; 11	MAN; Ret	PER; 11	MIS; 7	8th	11

=== Complete All Japan Formula 2 Championship results ===
(key) (Races in bold indicate pole position) (Races in italics indicate fastest lap)

Year	Entrant	Chassis	Engine	1	2	3	4	5	6	7	8	DC	Points
1981	Hachimonjiya Speed Box Team	March 802	BMW M12	SUZ	SUZ; 5							5th	30
1981	Walter Wolf Racing Japan	March 802	BMW M12			SUZ; 4	SUZ					5th	30
1981	Racing Mate Project Team	March 802	BMW M12					SUZ; 3				5th	30
1982	Marlboro Team Spirit	Spirit 201	Honda RA262E	SUZ	FUJ	SUZ	SUZ	SUZ; 2	**SUZ**; 3			7th	27
1983	RACING MATE Uchida Racing	March 832	BMW M12	SUZ	FUJ	MIN	SUZ	SUZ	FUJ	SUZ	SUZ; 7	17th	4
1984	Advan Sports Nova	March 842	Honda RA264E	SUZ; 14	FUJ; 1	MIN; 2	**SUZ**; 1	SUZ; 6	FUJ; 1	SUZ; 3	SUZ; 2	**2nd**	**102 (108)**

=== Complete Formula One World Championship results ===
(key)

Year	Entrant	Chassis	Engine	1	2	3	4	5	6	7	8	9	10	11	12	13	14	15	16	WDC	Pts
1980	Shadow Cars	Shadow DN11	Ford Cosworth DFV 3.0 V8	ARG; DNQ	BRA; DNQ	RSA	USW	BEL	MON	FRA	GBR	GER	AUT	NED	ITA	CAN	USA			NC	0
1983	Spirit Racing	Spirit 201	Honda RA163E 1.5 V6 t	BRA	USW	FRA	SMR	MON	BEL	DET	CAN	GBR; Ret		AUT; 12		ITA; Ret	EUR; 14	RSA		NC	0
1983	Spirit Racing	Spirit 201C	Honda RA163E 1.5 V6 t										GER; Ret		NED; 7					NC	0
1984	Tyrrell Racing Organisation	Tyrrell 012	Ford Cosworth DFY 3.0 V8	BRA	RSA	BEL	SMR	FRA	MON	CAN	DET	DAL	GBR; DSQ	GER; DSQ	AUT; DNQ	NED; DSQ				17th	3
1984	Toleman Group Motorsport	Toleman TG184	Hart 415T 1.5 L4 t														ITA; 4	EUR; Ret	POR; 11	17th	3
1985	Tyrrell Team	Tyrrell 012	Ford Cosworth DFY 3.0 V8	BRA; 7																7th	26
1985	Ferrari	Ferrari 156/85	Ferrari 031 1.5 V6 t		POR; 8	SMR; 6^{†}	MON; Ret	CAN; 2	DET; 2	FRA; 4	GBR; Ret	GER; 9	AUT; 4	NED; Ret	ITA; 5	BEL; Ret	EUR; Ret	RSA; 4	AUS; 5	7th	26
1986	Ferrari	Ferrari F1/86	Ferrari 032 1.5 V6 t	BRA; Ret	ESP; Ret	SMR; 4	MON; 10	BEL; 3	CAN; Ret	DET; Ret	FRA; Ret	GBR; Ret	GER; 11^{†}	HUN; 4	AUT; 3	ITA; 3	POR; 6	MEX; 12^{†}	AUS; 3	5th	23
1987	Marlboro McLaren TAG Turbo	McLaren MP4/3	TAG TTE PO1 1.5 V6 t	BRA; 3	SMR; 4	BEL; 2	MON; Ret	DET; 7	FRA; 8	GBR; Ret	GER; 2	HUN; Ret	AUT; 7	ITA; 6	POR; 5	ESP; 3	MEX; Ret	JPN; 3	AUS; Ret	6th	30
1988	Ligier Loto	Ligier JS31	Judd CV 3.5 V8	BRA; 9	SMR; DNQ	MON; Ret	MEX; 10	CAN; Ret	DET; Ret	FRA; DNQ	GBR; DNQ	GER; DNQ	HUN; Ret	BEL; 11^{†}	ITA; DNQ	POR; Ret	ESP; Ret	JPN; DNQ	AUS; 9^{†}	NC	0
1989	Moneytron Onyx Formula One	Onyx ORE-1	Ford Cosworth DFR 3.5 V8	BRA; DNPQ	SMR; DNPQ	MON; DNPQ	MEX; Ret	USA; Ret	CAN; DSQ	FRA; 5	GBR; DNPQ	GER; Ret	HUN; Ret	BEL; 8	ITA; DNPQ	POR; 3	ESP; DNPQ	JPN; DNPQ	AUS; DNPQ	12th	6
1990	Monteverdi Onyx Formula One	Onyx ORE-1	Ford Cosworth DFR 3.5 V8	USA; DNQ	BRA; DNQ	SMR	MON	CAN	MEX	FRA	GBR	GER	HUN	BEL	ITA	POR	ESP	JPN	AUS	NC	0
1991	AGS	AGS JH25B	Ford Cosworth DFR 3.5 V8	USA; DNQ	BRA; DNQ	SMR	MON													NC	0
1991	Footwork Porsche	Footwork FA12	Porsche 3512 3.5 V12					CAN; Ret	MEX; DNQ											NC	0
1991	Footwork Ford	Footwork FA12C	Ford Cosworth DFR 3.5 V8							FRA; DNQ	GBR; DNQ	GER	HUN	BEL	ITA	POR	ESP	JPN	AUS	NC	0

^{†} Did not finish, but was classified as he had completed more than 90% of the race distance.

=== Complete World Sportscar Championship results ===
(key) (Races in bold indicate pole position) (Races in italics indicate fastest lap)

Year	Entrant	Class	Chassis	Engine	1	2	3	4	5	6	7	8	9	10	11	Pos.	Pts
1982	BASF Cassetten Team GS Sport	C	Sauber SHS C6	Cosworth DFL 4.0 V8	MNZ	SIL	NÜR	LMS	SPA	MUG	FUJ	BRH; Ret				NC	0
1983	Sorga S.A. / Joest Racing	C	Porsche 956	Porsche Type-935 2.6 F6 t	MNZ	SIL; 2	NÜR; 2	LMS; 6	SPA; Ret		KYA; Ret					11th	36
1983	Porsche Kremer Racing	C	Porsche 956	Porsche Type-935 2.6 F6 t						FUJ; Ret						11th	36
1984	New-Man Joest Racing	C1	Porsche 956	Porsche Type-935 2.6 F6 t	MNZ; Ret	SIL	LMS; Ret	NÜR; 8	BRH	MOS	SPA; Ret	IMO	FUJ; 4	KYA	SAN	38th	13
1988	Team Sauber Mercedes	C1	Sauber C9	Mercedes-Benz M117 5.0 V8 t	JER	JAR	MNZ	SIL	LMS	BRN	BRH	NÜR; Ret	SPA; 1		SAN; 2	19th	55
1988	Toyota Team Tom's	C1	Toyota 88C-V	Toyota R32V 3.2 V8 t										FUJ; 21		19th	55
1991	Konrad Motorsport	C2	Porsche 962C	Porsche Type-935 3.2 F6 t	SUZ	MNZ; Ret	SIL									39th	6
1991	Mazdaspeed	C2	Mazda 787B	Mazda R26B 2.6 4-Rotor				LMS; 6								39th	6
1991	Konrad Motorsport	C1	Konrad KM-011	Lamborghini 3512 3.5 V12					NÜR; DNQ	MAG; Ret	MEX; Ret	AUT; Ret				39th	6
1992	Euro Racing	C1	Lola T92/10	Judd GV10 3.5 V10	MNZ; DNS	SIL; DSQ										NC	0
1992	Trust Racing Team	C2	Toyota 92C-V	Toyota R36V 3.6 V8 t				LMS; 5	DON	SUZ	MAG					NC	0

=== Complete 24 Hours of Le Mans results ===
Year	Team	Co-Drivers	Car	Class	Laps	Pos.	Class Pos.
1983	(Germany) Sorga S.A. / Joest Racing	(Germany) Klaus Ludwig (France) Bob Wollek	Porsche 956	C	354	6th	6th
1984	(Germany) New-Man Joest Racing	(France) Jean-Louis Schlesser (Colombia) Mauricio De Narváez	Porsche 956	C1	170	DNF	DNF
1990	(Japan) Mazdaspeed Co. Ltd.	(Republic of Ireland) David Kennedy (Belgium) Pierre Dieudonné	Mazda 787	GTP	147	DNF	DNF
1991	(Japan) Mazdaspeed Co. Ltd. (France) Oreca	(Republic of Ireland) David Kennedy (Brazil) Maurizio Sandro Sala	Mazda 787B	C2	355	6th	6th
1992	(Japan) Trust Racing Team	(South Africa) George Fouché (Sweden) Steven Andskär	Toyota 92C-V	C2	336	5th	**1st**
1997	(Germany) Joest Racing	(Italy) Michele Alboreto (Denmark) Tom Kristensen	TWR Porsche WSC-95	LMP	361	**1st**	**1st**
1998	(Germany) Porsche AG (Germany) Joest Racing	(Italy) Michele Alboreto (France) Yannick Dalmas	Porsche LMP1-98	LMP1	107	DNF	DNF
1999	(United Kingdom) Audi Sport UK Ltd.	(Monaco) Stéphane Ortelli (Germany) Christian Abt	Audi R8C	LMGTP	55	DNF	DNF
2000	(United States) Johansson-Matthews Racing	(United Kingdom) Guy Smith (United States) Jim Matthews	Reynard 2KQ-LM-Judd	LMP900	133	DNF	DNF
2001	(United Kingdom) Johansson Motorsport	(Netherlands) Tom Coronel (France) Patrick Lemarié	Audi R8	LMP900	35	DNF	DNF
2003	(United States) Champion Racing	(Italy) Emanuele Pirro (Finland) JJ Lehto	Audi R8	LMP900	372	**3rd**	**1st**
2006	(Netherlands) Racing for Holland	(Netherlands) Jan Lammers (Malaysia) Alex Yoong	Dome S101Hb-Judd	LMP1	182	DNF	DNF
2007	(United Kingdom) Arena Motorsports International	(Japan) Hayanari Shimoda (United Kingdom) Tom Chilton	Zytek 07S	LMP1	–	DNQ	DNQ
2007	(France) Courage Compétition	(France) Jean-Marc Gounon (France) Guillaume Moreau	Courage LC70-AER	LMP1	175	DNF	DNF
2008	(Spain) Epsilon Euskadi	(France) Jean-Marc Gounon (Japan) Shinji Nakano	Epsilon Euskadi EE1-Judd	LMP1	158	DNF	DNF
2012	(United Arab Emirates) Gulf Racing Middle East	(France) Fabien Giroix (France) Ludovic Badey	Lola B12/80-Nissan	LMP2	92	DNF	DNF

=== American open-wheel results ===
(key)

==== CART ====
(key) (Races in bold indicate pole position)

Year	Team	No.	Chassis	Engine	1	2	3	4	5	6	7	8	9	10	11	12	13	14	15	16	17	Rank	Points	Ref
1992	Bettenhausen Racing	16	Penske PC-20	Chevrolet 265A V8 t	SRF	PHX	LBH	INDY	DET; 3	POR	MIL	NHA; 10	TOR; 11	MCH	CLE; 9	ROA; 19	VAN; 3	MDO; 6	NAZ; 21	LAG; 11		14th	47	
1993	Bettenhausen Motorsports	16	Penske PC-22	Chevrolet 265C V8 t	SRF; 12	PHX; 21	LBH; 26	INDY; 11	MIL; 25	DET; 20	POR; 26	CLE; 4	TOR; 24	MCH; 23	NHA; 14	ROA; 21	VAN; 3	MDO; 26	NAZ; 7	LAG; 6		13th	43	
1994	Bettenhausen Motorsports	16	Penske PC-22	Ilmor 265D V8 t	SRF; 5	PHX; 4	LBH; 10	INDY; 15	MIL; 26	DET; 22	POR; 8	CLE; 5	TOR; 14	MCH; 14	MDO; 12	NHA; 23	VAN; 26	ROA; 8	NAZ; 5	LAG; 12		11th	57	
1995	Bettenhausen Motorsports	16	Penske PC-23	Mercedes-Benz IC108B V8 t	MIA; 22	SRF; 17	PHX; 24	LBH; 6	NAZ; 3		MIL; 21	DET; 11	POR; 6	ROA; 10	TOR; 14	CLE; 8	MCH; 6	MDO; 23	NHA; 25	VAN; 4	LAG; 14	13th	60	
1995	Bettenhausen Motorsports	16	Reynard 94i	Ford-Cosworth XB V8 t						INDY; 16												13th	60	
1996	Bettenhausen Racing	16	Reynard 96i	Mercedes-Benz IC108C V8 t	MIA; 19	RIO; 23	SRF; 6	LBH; 19	NAZ; 19	500; 16	MIL; 27	DET; 7	POR; 9	CLE; 12	TOR; 17	MCH; 5	MDO; 11	ROA; 4	VAN; 17	LAG; 21		15th	43	

==== Indianapolis 500 ====
Year	Chassis	Engine	Start	Finish	Team
1993	Penske PC-22	Chevrolet 265C V8 t	6	11	Bettenhausen Motorsports
1994	Penske PC-22	Ilmor 265D V8 t	27	15	Bettenhausen Motorsports
1995	Reynard 94i	Ford-Cosworth XB V8 t	31	16	Bettenhausen Motorsports

=== Complete Macau Grand Prix results ===
Year	Team	Chassis/Engine	Qualifying	Race1	Race2	Overall ranking
1984	(Hong Kong) Marlboro Theodore Racing Team	Ralt・Toyota	1st	**1**	**2**	**2nd**
1988	(Republic of Ireland) Camel Eddie Jordan Racing	Reynard・VW	25th	13	9	8th

=== Complete Grand Prix Masters results ===
(key) Races in bold indicate pole position, races in italics indicate fastest lap.

Year	Team	Chassis	Engine	1	2	3	4	5
2005	Team Phantom	Delta Motorsport GPM	Nicholson McLaren 3.5 V8	RSA; Ret				
2006	Team Altech	Delta Motorsport GPM	Nicholson McLaren 3.5 V8	QAT; 8	ITA; C			
2006	Team Virgin Radio	Delta Motorsport GPM	Nicholson McLaren 3.5 V8			GBR; 12	MAL; C	RSA; C

=== Complete FIA World Endurance Championship results ===
(key) (Races in bold indicate pole position; races in italics indicate fastest lap)

Year	Entrant	Class	Car	Engine	1	2	3	4	5	6	7	8	Pos.	Pts
2012	Gulf Racing Middle East	LMP2	Lola B12/80	Nissan VK45DE 4.5 V8	SEB; 22	SPA; 10	LMS; Ret	SIL	SÃO	BHR	FUJ	SHA	76th	1.5

== Notes ==
Sporting positions
Preceded by Chico Serra	British Formula Three Champion; 1980	Succeeded by Jonathan Palmer
Preceded by Jeff Andretti	CART Rookie of the Year; 1992	Succeeded by Nigel Mansell
Preceded by Manuel Reuter; Davy Jones; Alexander Wurz	Winner of the 24 Hours of Le Mans; 1997; With: Michele Alboreto & Tom Kristensen	Succeeded by Laurent Aïello; Allan McNish; Stéphane Ortelli
