= 1988 1000 km of Spa =

Sportscar Championship

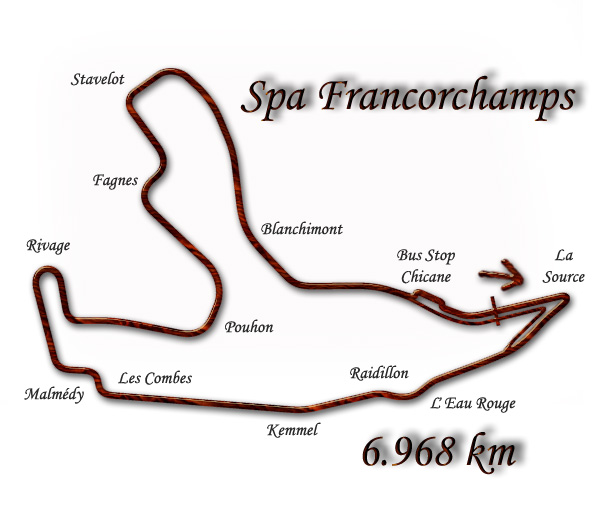
Layout of the Circuit de Spa-Francorchamps (1981–1993, 1995–2003)

The 1988 1000 km Spa was the ninth round of the 1988 World Sportscar Championship season. It took place at the Circuit de Spa-Francorchamps, Belgium on September 18, 1988.

== Official results ==
Class winners in bold. Cars failing to complete 75% of the winner's distance marked as Not Classified (NC).

Pos	Class	No	Team	Drivers	Chassis	Tyre	Laps
Pos	Class	No	Team	Drivers	Engine	Tyre	Laps
1	**C1**	**62**	**(Switzerland) Team Sauber Mercedes**	**(Italy) Mauro Baldi (Sweden) Stefan Johansson**	**Sauber C9**	MI	**142**
1	**C1**	**62**	**(Switzerland) Team Sauber Mercedes**	**(Italy) Mauro Baldi (Sweden) Stefan Johansson**	**Mercedes-Benz M117 5.0L Turbo V8**	MI	**142**
2	C1	2	(United Kingdom) Silk Cut Jaguar	(Netherlands) Jan Lammers (United Kingdom) Martin Brundle	Jaguar XJR-9	D	142
2	C1	2	(United Kingdom) Silk Cut Jaguar	(Netherlands) Jan Lammers (United Kingdom) Martin Brundle	Jaguar 7.0L V12	D	142
3	C1	61	(Switzerland) Team Sauber Mercedes	(France) Jean-Louis Schlesser (Germany) Jochen Mass	Sauber C9	MI	139
3	C1	61	(Switzerland) Team Sauber Mercedes	(France) Jean-Louis Schlesser (Germany) Jochen Mass	Mercedes-Benz M117 5.0L Turbo V8	MI	139
4	C1	5	(Switzerland) Brun Motorsport	(Germany) Manuel Reuter (Argentina) Oscar Larrauri	Porsche 962C	MI	138
4	C1	5	(Switzerland) Brun Motorsport	(Germany) Manuel Reuter (Argentina) Oscar Larrauri	Porsche Type-935 3.0L Turbo Flat-6	MI	138
5	**C2**	**103**	**(United Kingdom) Spice Engineering**	**(Italy) Almo Coppelli (Denmark) Thorkild Thyrring**	**Spice SE88C**	G	**134**
5	**C2**	**103**	**(United Kingdom) Spice Engineering**	**(Italy) Almo Coppelli (Denmark) Thorkild Thyrring**	**Ford Cosworth DFL 3.3L V8**	G	**134**
6	C2	111	(United Kingdom) Spice Engineering	(United Kingdom) Ray Bellm (United Kingdom) Gordon Spice	Spice SE88C	G	132
6	C2	111	(United Kingdom) Spice Engineering	(United Kingdom) Ray Bellm (United Kingdom) Gordon Spice	Ford Cosworth DFL 3.3L V8	G	132
7	C1	40	(Switzerland) Swiss Team Salamin	(Switzerland) Antoine Salamin (Italy) Giovanni Lavaggi	Porsche 962C	G	129
7	C1	40	(Switzerland) Swiss Team Salamin	(Switzerland) Antoine Salamin (Italy) Giovanni Lavaggi	Porsche Type-935 3.0L Turbo Flat-6	G	129
8	C1	20	(United Kingdom) Team Davey	(United Kingdom) Tim Lee-Davey (United Kingdom) Tom Dodd-Noble	Porsche 962C	D	129
8	C1	20	(United Kingdom) Team Davey	(United Kingdom) Tim Lee-Davey (United Kingdom) Tom Dodd-Noble	Porsche Type-935 3.0L Turbo Flat-6	D	129
9	C2	127	(United Kingdom) Chamberlain Engineering	(United Kingdom) John Williams (United Kingdom) Nick Adams (United Kingdom) Richard Jones	Spice SE86C	A	127
9	C2	127	(United Kingdom) Chamberlain Engineering	(United Kingdom) John Williams (United Kingdom) Nick Adams (United Kingdom) Richard Jones	Hart 418T 1.8L Turbo I4	A	127
10	C2	117	(Norway) Team Lucky Strike Schanche	(Austria) "Pierre Chauvet" (United Kingdom) Robin Smith (United Kingdom) John Sheldon	Argo JM19C	G	126
10	C2	117	(Norway) Team Lucky Strike Schanche	(Austria) "Pierre Chauvet" (United Kingdom) Robin Smith (United Kingdom) John Sheldon	Ford Cosworth DFL 3.3L V8	G	126
11	C2	191	(United Kingdom) PC Automotive	(United Kingdom) Richard Piper (United States) Olindo Iacobelli	Argo JM19C	G	126
11	C2	191	(United Kingdom) PC Automotive	(United Kingdom) Richard Piper (United States) Olindo Iacobelli	Ford Cosworth DFL 3.3L V8	G	126
12	C2	151	(Switzerland) Pierre-Alain Lombardi	(Switzerland) Pierre-Alain Lombardi (France) Bruno Sotty (France) Thierry Lecerf	Spice SE86C	A	123
12	C2	151	(Switzerland) Pierre-Alain Lombardi	(Switzerland) Pierre-Alain Lombardi (France) Bruno Sotty (France) Thierry Lecerf	Ford Cosworth DFL 3.3L V8	A	123
13	C2	106	(Italy) Kelmar Racing	(Italy) Pasquale Barberio (Italy) Vito Veninata (Italy) Stefano Sebastiani	Tiga GC288	A	123
13	C2	106	(Italy) Kelmar Racing	(Italy) Pasquale Barberio (Italy) Vito Veninata (Italy) Stefano Sebastiani	Ford Cosworth DFL 3.3L V8	A	123
14	C2	124	(France) MT Sport Racing	(France) Pierre-François Rousselot (France) Jean Messaoudi	Argo JM19C	A	122
14	C2	124	(France) MT Sport Racing	(France) Pierre-François Rousselot (France) Jean Messaoudi	Ford Cosworth DFL 3.3L V8	A	122
15	C2	109	(Italy) Kelmar Racing	(Italy) Ranieri Randaccio (Italy) Maurizio Gellini (Italy) Luigi Taverna	Tiga GC288	A	120
15	C2	109	(Italy) Kelmar Racing	(Italy) Ranieri Randaccio (Italy) Maurizio Gellini (Italy) Luigi Taverna	Ford Cosworth DFL 3.3L V8	A	120
16	C2	107	(United Kingdom) Chamberlain Engineering	(France) Claude Ballot-Léna (France) Jean-Louis Ricci	Spice SE88C	A	118
16	C2	107	(United Kingdom) Chamberlain Engineering	(France) Claude Ballot-Léna (France) Jean-Louis Ricci	Ford Cosworth DFL 3.3L V8	A	118
17	C2	177	(France) Automobiles Louis Descartes	(France) Gérard Tremblay (United Kingdom) David Mercer	ALD C2	A	113
17	C2	177	(France) Automobiles Louis Descartes	(France) Gérard Tremblay (United Kingdom) David Mercer	BMW M80 3.5L I6	A	113
18 DNF	C1	8	(Germany) Joest Racing	(Germany) Frank Jelinski (Germany) "John Winter"	Porsche 962C	G	115
18 DNF	C1	8	(Germany) Joest Racing	(Germany) Frank Jelinski (Germany) "John Winter"	Porsche Type-935 3.0L Turbo Flat-6	G	115
19 DNF	C2	125	(France) Patrick Oudet Vetir Racing	(France) Patrick Oudet (France) Jean-Claude Ferrarin (Belgium) Pascal Witmeur	Tiga GC85	A	87
19 DNF	C2	125	(France) Patrick Oudet Vetir Racing	(France) Patrick Oudet (France) Jean-Claude Ferrarin (Belgium) Pascal Witmeur	Ford Cosworth DFL 3.3L V8	A	87
20 DNF	C1	35	(Austria) Walter Lechner Racing School	(Austria) Walter Lechner (Austria) Ernst Franzmaier (Germany) Jochen Dauer	Porsche 962C	D	81
20 DNF	C1	35	(Austria) Walter Lechner Racing School	(Austria) Walter Lechner (Austria) Ernst Franzmaier (Germany) Jochen Dauer	Porsche Type-935 3.0L Turbo Flat-6	D	81
21 DNF	C2	177	(France) Automobiles Louis Descartes	(France) Jacques Heuclin (France) Louis Descartes (France) Dominique Lacaud	ALD C2	A	67
21 DNF	C2	177	(France) Automobiles Louis Descartes	(France) Jacques Heuclin (France) Louis Descartes (France) Dominique Lacaud	BMW M80 3.5L I6	A	67
22 DNF	C1	14	(United Kingdom) Richard Lloyd Racing	(United Kingdom) Martin Donnelly (United Kingdom) Derek Bell	Porsche 962C GTi	G	63
22 DNF	C1	14	(United Kingdom) Richard Lloyd Racing	(United Kingdom) Martin Donnelly (United Kingdom) Derek Bell	Porsche Type-935 3.0L Turbo Flat-6	G	63
23 DNF	C2	121	(United Kingdom) GP Motorsport	(South Africa) Wayne Taylor (Greece) Costas Los	Spice SE87C	G	56
23 DNF	C2	121	(United Kingdom) GP Motorsport	(South Africa) Wayne Taylor (Greece) Costas Los	Ford Cosworth DFL 3.3L V8	G	56
24 DNF	C1	1	(United Kingdom) Silk Cut Jaguar	(United Kingdom) Johnny Dumfries (United States) Eddie Cheever	Jaguar XJR-9	D	49
24 DNF	C1	1	(United Kingdom) Silk Cut Jaguar	(United Kingdom) Johnny Dumfries (United States) Eddie Cheever	Jaguar 7.0L V12	D	49
25 DNF	C1	4	(Switzerland) Brun Motorsport	(Switzerland) Walter Brun (Argentina) Oscar Larrauri (Germany) Manuel Reuter	Porsche 962C	MI	39
25 DNF	C1	4	(Switzerland) Brun Motorsport	(Switzerland) Walter Brun (Argentina) Oscar Larrauri (Germany) Manuel Reuter	Porsche Type-935 3.0L Turbo Flat-6	MI	39
26 DNF	C1	7	(Germany) Blaupunkt Joest Racing	(Italy) Paolo Barilla (France) Bob Wollek	Porsche 962C	G	31
26 DNF	C1	7	(Germany) Blaupunkt Joest Racing	(Italy) Paolo Barilla (France) Bob Wollek	Porsche Type-935 3.0L Turbo Flat-6	G	31
27 DNF	C2	198	(United Kingdom) Roy Baker Racing	(United Kingdom) Val Musetti (United States) Stephen Hynes (Morocco) Max Cohen-Olivar	Tiga GC286	G	17
27 DNF	C2	198	(United Kingdom) Roy Baker Racing	(United Kingdom) Val Musetti (United States) Stephen Hynes (Morocco) Max Cohen-Olivar	Ford Cosworth DFL 3.3L V8	G	17

== Statistics ==
- Pole Position - #62 Team Sauber Mercedes - 2:02.250
- Fastest Lap - #2 Silk Cut Jaguar - 2:22.120
- Average Speed - 163.533 km/h

World Sportscar Championship
Previous race: 1988 1000km of Nürburgring	1988 season	Next race: 1988 1000km of Fuji
