= 1988 360 km of Brno =

Layout of the Brno Circuit

The 1988 Grand Prix ČSSR was the sixth round of the 1988 World Sports-Prototype Championship season. It took place at the Autodrom Brno, Czechoslovakia on July 10, 1988.

== Official results ==
Class winners in bold. Cars failing to complete 75% of the winner's distance marked as Not Classified (NC).

Pos	Class	No	Team	Drivers	Chassis	Tyre	Laps
Pos	Class	No	Team	Drivers	Engine	Tyre	Laps
1	**C1**	**62**	**(Switzerland) Team Sauber Mercedes**	**(Germany) Jochen Mass (France) Jean-Louis Schlesser**	**Sauber C9**	MI	**67**
1	**C1**	**62**	**(Switzerland) Team Sauber Mercedes**	**(Germany) Jochen Mass (France) Jean-Louis Schlesser**	**Mercedes-Benz M117 5.0L Turbo V8**	MI	**67**
2	C1	1	(United Kingdom) Silk Cut Jaguar	(United Kingdom) Martin Brundle (Denmark) John Nielsen	Jaguar XJR-9	D	67
2	C1	1	(United Kingdom) Silk Cut Jaguar	(United Kingdom) Martin Brundle (Denmark) John Nielsen	Jaguar 7.0L V12	D	67
3	C1	2	(United Kingdom) Silk Cut Jaguar	(Netherlands) Jan Lammers (United Kingdom) Johnny Dumfries	Jaguar XJR-9	D	67
3	C1	2	(United Kingdom) Silk Cut Jaguar	(Netherlands) Jan Lammers (United Kingdom) Johnny Dumfries	Jaguar 7.0L V12	D	67
4	C1	61	(Switzerland) Team Sauber Mercedes	(United Kingdom) James Weaver (Italy) Mauro Baldi	Sauber C9	MI	67
4	C1	61	(Switzerland) Team Sauber Mercedes	(United Kingdom) James Weaver (Italy) Mauro Baldi	Mercedes-Benz M117 5.0L Turbo V8	MI	67
5	C1	7	(Germany) Blaupunkt Joest Racing	(Germany) "John Winter" (France) Bob Wollek	Porsche 962C	G	66
5	C1	7	(Germany) Blaupunkt Joest Racing	(Germany) "John Winter" (France) Bob Wollek	Porsche Type-935 3.0L Turbo Flat-6	G	66
6	C1	8	(Germany) Blaupunkt Joest Racing	(Germany) Jürgen Barth (Austria) Franz Konrad	Porsche 962C	G	65
6	C1	8	(Germany) Blaupunkt Joest Racing	(Germany) Jürgen Barth (Austria) Franz Konrad	Porsche Type-935 3.0L Turbo Flat-6	G	65
7	**C2**	**111**	**(United Kingdom) Spice Engineering**	**(United Kingdom) Ray Bellm (United Kingdom) Gordon Spice**	**Spice SE88C**	G	**65**
7	**C2**	**111**	**(United Kingdom) Spice Engineering**	**(United Kingdom) Ray Bellm (United Kingdom) Gordon Spice**	**Ford Cosworth DFL 3.3L V8**	G	**65**
8	C2	103	(United Kingdom) BP Spice Engineering	(Italy) Almo Coppelli (Denmark) Thorkild Thyrring	Spice SE88C	G	64
8	C2	103	(United Kingdom) BP Spice Engineering	(Italy) Almo Coppelli (Denmark) Thorkild Thyrring	Ford Cosworth DFL 3.3L V8	G	64
9	C1	40	(Switzerland) Swiss Team Salamin	(Switzerland) Antoine Salamin (Italy) Luigi Taverna	Porsche 962C	G	63
9	C1	40	(Switzerland) Swiss Team Salamin	(Switzerland) Antoine Salamin (Italy) Luigi Taverna	Porsche Type-935 3.0L Turbo Flat-6	G	63
10	C2	127	(United Kingdom) Chamberlain Engineering	(United Kingdom) Paul Sott (United Kingdom) Nick Adams	Spice SE86C	A	60
10	C2	127	(United Kingdom) Chamberlain Engineering	(United Kingdom) Paul Sott (United Kingdom) Nick Adams	Hart 418T 1.8L Turbo I4	A	60
11	C2	106	(Italy) Kelmar Racing	(Italy) Vito Veninata (Italy) Pasquale Barberio	Tiga GC288	A	60
11	C2	106	(Italy) Kelmar Racing	(Italy) Vito Veninata (Italy) Pasquale Barberio	Ford Cosworth DFL 3.3L V8	A	60
12	C2	198	(United Kingdom) Roy Baker Racing	(United States) Lon Bender (United Kingdom) Mike Kimpton	Tiga GC286	G	56
12	C2	198	(United Kingdom) Roy Baker Racing	(United States) Lon Bender (United Kingdom) Mike Kimpton	Ford Cosworth DFL 3.3L V8	G	56
13 DSQ^{†}	C2	107	(United Kingdom) Chamberlain Engineering	(France) Claude Ballot-Léna (France) Jean-Louis Ricci	Spice SE88C	A	62
13 DSQ^{†}	C2	107	(United Kingdom) Chamberlain Engineering	(France) Claude Ballot-Léna (France) Jean-Louis Ricci	Ford Cosworth DFL 3.3L V8	A	62
14 DNF	C2	121	(United Kingdom) GP Motorsport	(United Kingdom) Evan Clements (Greece) Costas Los	Spice SE87C	G	62
14 DNF	C2	121	(United Kingdom) GP Motorsport	(United Kingdom) Evan Clements (Greece) Costas Los	Ford Cosworth DFL 3.3L V8	G	62
15 DNF	C2	177	(France) Automobiles Louis Descartes	(France) Louis Descartes (France) Gérard Tremblay	ALD C2	A	32
15 DNF	C2	177	(France) Automobiles Louis Descartes	(France) Louis Descartes (France) Gérard Tremblay	BMW M80 3.5L I6	A	32
16 DNF	C2	24	(Italy) Dollop Racing	(Italy) Paolo Giangrossi (Switzerland) Jean-Pierre Frey	Lancia LC2	D	19
16 DNF	C2	24	(Italy) Dollop Racing	(Italy) Paolo Giangrossi (Switzerland) Jean-Pierre Frey	Ferrari 308C 3.0L Turbo V8	D	19
17 DNF	C2	109	(Italy) Kelmar Racing	(Italy) Ranieri Randaccio (Italy) Maurizio Gellini	Tiga GC288	A	12
17 DNF	C2	109	(Italy) Kelmar Racing	(Italy) Ranieri Randaccio (Italy) Maurizio Gellini	Ford Cosworth DFL 3.3L V8	A	12

† – The #107 Chamberlain Engineering entry was disqualified for being pushed across the finish line at the end of the race.

== Statistics ==
- Pole Position – #61 Team Sauber Mercedes – 1:46.440
- Fastest Lap – #61 Team Sauber Mercedes – 1:49.770
- Average Speed – 171.175 km/h

World Sportscar Championship
Previous race: 1988 24 Hours of Le Mans	1988 season	Next race: 1988 1000km of Brands Hatch
