= 1988 1000 km of Brands Hatch =

Layout of the Brands Hatch (1988-1998)

The 1988 Brands Hatch 1000 km was the seventh round of the 1988 World Sportscar Championship season. It took place at Brands Hatch, United Kingdom on 24 July 1988.

== Official results ==
Class winners in bold. Cars failing to complete 75% of the winner's distance marked as Not Classified (NC).

Pos	Class	No	Team	Drivers	Chassis	Tyre	Laps
Pos	Class	No	Team	Drivers	Engine	Tyre	Laps
1	**C1**	**1**	**(United Kingdom) Silk Cut Jaguar**	**(United Kingdom) Martin Brundle (United Kingdom) Andy Wallace (Denmark) John Nielsen**	**Jaguar XJR-9**	D	**240**
1	**C1**	**1**	**(United Kingdom) Silk Cut Jaguar**	**(United Kingdom) Martin Brundle (United Kingdom) Andy Wallace (Denmark) John Nielsen**	**Jaguar 7.0L V12**	D	**240**
2	C1	7	(Germany) Blaupunkt Joest Racing	(Germany) Klaus Ludwig (France) Bob Wollek	Porsche 962C	G	239
2	C1	7	(Germany) Blaupunkt Joest Racing	(Germany) Klaus Ludwig (France) Bob Wollek	Porsche Type-935 3.0L Turbo Flat-6	G	239
3	C1	61	(Switzerland) Team Sauber Mercedes	(France) Jean-Louis Schlesser (Italy) Mauro Baldi	Sauber C9	MI	235
3	C1	61	(Switzerland) Team Sauber Mercedes	(France) Jean-Louis Schlesser (Italy) Mauro Baldi	Mercedes-Benz M117 5.0L Turbo V8	MI	235
4	**C2**	**111**	**(United Kingdom) BP Spice Engineering**	**(United Kingdom) Ray Bellm (United Kingdom) Gordon Spice**	**Spice SE88C**	G	**224**
4	**C2**	**111**	**(United Kingdom) BP Spice Engineering**	**(United Kingdom) Ray Bellm (United Kingdom) Gordon Spice**	**Ford Cosworth DFL 3.3L V8**	G	**224**
5	C2	103	(United Kingdom) BP Spice Engineering	(Italy) Almo Coppelli (Denmark) Thorkild Thyrring	Spice SE88C	G	224
5	C2	103	(United Kingdom) BP Spice Engineering	(Italy) Almo Coppelli (Denmark) Thorkild Thyrring	Ford Cosworth DFL 3.3L V8	G	224
6	C2	121	(United Kingdom) GP Motorsport	(South Africa) Wayne Taylor (Greece) Costas Los	Spice SE87C	G	219
6	C2	121	(United Kingdom) GP Motorsport	(South Africa) Wayne Taylor (Greece) Costas Los	Ford Cosworth DFL 3.3L V8	G	219
7	C1	40	(Switzerland) Swiss Team Salamin	(Switzerland) Antoine Salamin (Switzerland) Jean-Denis Délétraz (Italy) Giovanni Lavaggi	Porsche 962C	G	217
7	C1	40	(Switzerland) Swiss Team Salamin	(Switzerland) Antoine Salamin (Switzerland) Jean-Denis Délétraz (Italy) Giovanni Lavaggi	Porsche Type-935 3.0L Turbo Flat-6	G	217
8	C2	107	(United Kingdom) Chamberlain Engineering	(France) Claude Ballot-Léna (France) Jean-Louis Ricci	Spice SE88C	A	211
8	C2	107	(United Kingdom) Chamberlain Engineering	(France) Claude Ballot-Léna (France) Jean-Louis Ricci	Ford Cosworth DFL 3.3L V8	A	211
9	C2	109	(Italy) Kelmar Racing	(Italy) Ranieri Randaccio (Italy) Vito Veninata (Italy) Maurizio Gellini	Tiga GC288	A	206
9	C2	109	(Italy) Kelmar Racing	(Italy) Ranieri Randaccio (Italy) Vito Veninata (Italy) Maurizio Gellini	Ford Cosworth DFL 3.3L V8	A	206
10	C2	117	(Norway) Team Lucky Strike Schanche	(Norway) Martin Schanche (United Kingdom) Will Hoy	Argo JM19C	G	205
10	C2	117	(Norway) Team Lucky Strike Schanche	(Norway) Martin Schanche (United Kingdom) Will Hoy	Ford Cosworth DFL 3.3L V8	G	205
11	C2	191	(United Kingdom) PC Automotive	(United Kingdom) Richard Piper (United States) Olindo Iacobelli	Argo JM19C	G	192
11	C2	191	(United Kingdom) PC Automotive	(United Kingdom) Richard Piper (United States) Olindo Iacobelli	Ford Cosworth DFL 3.3L V8	G	192
12	C2	123	(United Kingdom) Charles Ivey Racing (United Kingdom) Team Istel	(United Kingdom) Chris Hodgetts (United Kingdom) Robin Donovan (United Kingdom) Tim Harvey	Tiga GC287	D	180
12	C2	123	(United Kingdom) Charles Ivey Racing (United Kingdom) Team Istel	(United Kingdom) Chris Hodgetts (United Kingdom) Robin Donovan (United Kingdom) Tim Harvey	Porsche Type-935 2.8L Turbo Flat-6	D	180
13 NC	C2	198	(United Kingdom) Roy Baker Racing	(United Kingdom) John Bartlett (Morocco) Max Cohen-Olivar (United States) Stephen Hynes	Tiga GC286	G	140
13 NC	C2	198	(United Kingdom) Roy Baker Racing	(United Kingdom) John Bartlett (Morocco) Max Cohen-Olivar (United States) Stephen Hynes	Ford Cosworth DFL 3.3L V8	G	140
14 DNF	C1	2	(United Kingdom) Silk Cut Jaguar	(Netherlands) Jan Lammers (United Kingdom) Johnny Dumfries	Jaguar XJR-9	D	212
14 DNF	C1	2	(United Kingdom) Silk Cut Jaguar	(Netherlands) Jan Lammers (United Kingdom) Johnny Dumfries	Jaguar 7.0L V12	D	212
16 DNF	C1	8	(Germany) Joest Racing	(Germany) Frank Jelinski (Germany) "John Winter"	Porsche 962C	G	131
16 DNF	C1	8	(Germany) Joest Racing	(Germany) Frank Jelinski (Germany) "John Winter"	Porsche Type-935 3.0L Turbo Flat-6	G	131
17 DNF	C2	115	(United Kingdom) ADA Engineering	(United Kingdom) John Sheldon (United Kingdom) Tim Lee-Davey (Austria) "Pierre Chauvet"	ADA 03	G	123
17 DNF	C2	115	(United Kingdom) ADA Engineering	(United Kingdom) John Sheldon (United Kingdom) Tim Lee-Davey (Austria) "Pierre Chauvet"	Ford Cosworth DFL 3.3L V8	G	123
18 DNF	C2	125	(France) Patrick Oudet Verit Racing	(France) Jean-Claude Ferrarin (France) Dominique Lacaud	Tiga GC85	A	122
18 DNF	C2	125	(France) Patrick Oudet Verit Racing	(France) Jean-Claude Ferrarin (France) Dominique Lacaud	Ford Cosworth DFL 3.3L V8	A	122
19 DNF	C1	42	(France) Noël del Bello Racing	(Belgium) Hervé Regout (France) Noël del Bello (Switzerland) Bernard Santal	Sauber C8	G	104
19 DNF	C1	42	(France) Noël del Bello Racing	(Belgium) Hervé Regout (France) Noël del Bello (Switzerland) Bernard Santal	Mercedes-Benz M117 5.0L Turbo V8	G	104
20 DNF	C2	112	(United Kingdom) FAI Automotive	(United Kingdom) Sean Walker (United Kingdom) Paul Stott (United Kingdom) Ian Flux	Tiga GC287	G	89
20 DNF	C2	112	(United Kingdom) FAI Automotive	(United Kingdom) Sean Walker (United Kingdom) Paul Stott (United Kingdom) Ian Flux	Ford Cosworth DFL 3.3L V8	G	89
21 DNF	C2	127	(United Kingdom) Chamberlain Engineering	(Republic of Ireland) Martin Birrane (United Kingdom) Nick Adams	Spice SE86C	A	42
21 DNF	C2	127	(United Kingdom) Chamberlain Engineering	(Republic of Ireland) Martin Birrane (United Kingdom) Nick Adams	Hart 418T 1.8L Turbo I4	A	42
22 DNF	C1	3	(United Kingdom) Silk Cut Jaguar	(United Kingdom) John Watson (United States) Davy Jones	Jaguar XJR-9	D	39
22 DNF	C1	3	(United Kingdom) Silk Cut Jaguar	(United Kingdom) John Watson (United States) Davy Jones	Jaguar 7.0L V12	D	39
23 DNF	C2	177	(France) Automobiles Louis Descartes	(France) Gérard Tremblay (France) Michel Lateste (United Kingdom) Del Bennet	ALD C2	A	25
23 DNF	C2	177	(France) Automobiles Louis Descartes	(France) Gérard Tremblay (France) Michel Lateste (United Kingdom) Del Bennet	BMW M80 3.5L I6	A	25
24 DNF	C1	62	(Switzerland) Team Sauber Mercedes	(France) Jean-Louis Schlesser (Germany) Jochen Mass	Sauber C9	MI	7
24 DNF	C1	62	(Switzerland) Team Sauber Mercedes	(France) Jean-Louis Schlesser (Germany) Jochen Mass	Mercedes-Benz M117 5.0L Turbo V8	MI	7

== Statistics ==
- Pole Position - #61 Team Sauber Mercedes - 1:14.170
- Fastest Lap - #61 Team Sauber Mercedes - 1:15.820
- Average Speed - 180.747 km/h

World Sportscar Championship
Previous race: 1988 360km of Brno	1988 season	Next race: 1988 1000km of Nürburgring
