= Sauber C9 =

Le Mans racing car

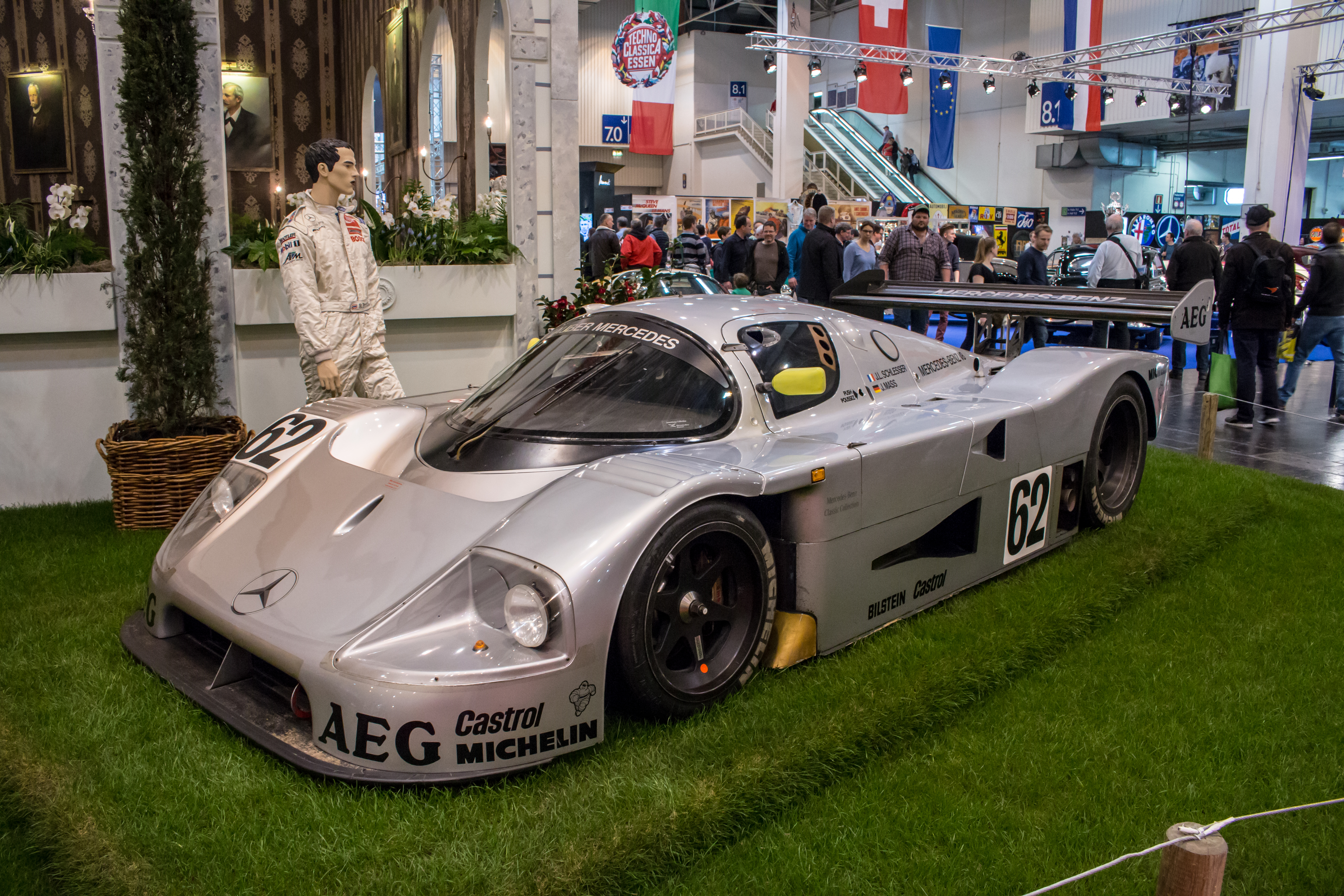
- The No. 62 C9 on display in 2018
- Category: Group C Prototype
- Constructor: Sauber Motorsport
- Designers: Peter Sauber; Heini Mader; Leo Ress
- Predecessor: Sauber C8
- Successor: Mercedes-Benz C11

Technical specifications
- Chassis: Light alloy monocoque
- Suspension (front): Double wishbones, coil springs over shock absorbers, torsion bar stabilizer
- Suspension (rear): Double wishbones, push-rod operated coil springs over shock absorbers, torsion bar stabilizer
- Length: 4,800 mm (189.0 in)
- Width: 2,000 mm (78.7 in)
- Height: 1,070 mm (42.1 in)
- Axle track: 1,600 mm (63.0 in)
- Wheelbase: 2,770 mm (109.1 in)
- Engine: Mercedes-Benz M119HL 4,973 cc (5.0 L; 303.5 cu in) 90° V8 Twin KKK Type 27 Turbos Mid, longitudinally mounted
- Torque: 578.6 lb⋅ft (784 N⋅m)
- Transmission: Hewland VGC 5-speed Manual
- Power: producing 720 to 820hp (545 to 611kW) at 7,000 rpm
- Weight: 905 kg (1,995.2 lb)
- Fuel: Bosch Motronic MP 1.7 Fuel Injection
- Tyres: Michelin

Competition history
- Notable entrants: (Switzerland) Kouros Racing (Germany) Team Sauber Mercedes
- Notable drivers: (Germany) Jochen Mass; (Germany) Manuel Reuter; (Sweden) Stanley Dickens (Italy) Mauro Baldi; (United Kingdom) Kenny Acheson; (Italy) Gianfranco Brancatelli; (France) Jean-Louis Schlesser; (France) Jean-Pierre Jabouille; (France) Alain Cudini; (United Kingdom) Johnny Dumfries; (New Zealand) Mike Thackwell; (Germany) Michael Schumacher
- Debut: 1987 1000km of Spa
- First win: 1988 800km of Jerez
- Last win: 1990 480km of Suzuka
- Last event: 1990 480km of Suzuka
Races	Wins	Poles	F/Laps
21	13	7	5
- Teams' Championships: 1 (1989)
- Constructors' Championships: 1 (1989)
- Drivers' Championships: 1 (Jean-Louis Schlesser, 1989)

The Sauber C9 (later named the Sauber Mercedes C9 or Mercedes-Benz C9) is a Group C prototype racing car introduced in 1987 as a continuation of the partnership between Sauber as a constructor and Mercedes-Benz as an engine builder for the World Sportscar Championship. The C9 replaced the Sauber C8.

== Development ==
The C9 was a development of Sauber's previous C8 design, retaining a monocoque that largely consisted of aluminium, although considerably stiffer and with numerous other improvements. The rear suspension changed from vertically positioned spring/damper units arranged over the top of the gearbox to a horizontal layout aligned with the longitudinal axis of the car. Aerodynamic changes included the repositioning of the combination of oil/water radiator to the nose of the car, which allowed the use of a modified splitter plate. Commensurate with the repositioning of the radiators, the large NACA ducts were removed from the top of the door sills. The rear deck had been considerably re-profiled and the rear wing was now mounted solely on a central support. Aerodynamically, the car had two configurations: one for sprint circuits and a low drag version for the 5.8 kilometre Mulsanne Straight at Le Mans. In its sprint configuration, it produced 2,222.1 kg (4,899 lb) of downforce at 320 km/h (200 mph) while generating 555.7 kg (1,225 lb) of drag. The sprint circuit configuration had a L/D ratio of 4:1 while the low drag version was around 3:1. The early engines were again prepared by Swiss engine specialist, Heini Mader, though this is now known to have been a cover for Mercedes back door involvement with the project later on. It had been progressively lightened with the use of a new crankshaft, higher efficiency KKK turbochargers and a liner-less block. It was a semi-stressed part of the chassis and ran a dry sump. There were no special qualifying engines and on 2.2 bar of boost it was said to be rated at "almost 800 hp (811 PS; 597 kW)". Maximum race boost was 1.9 bar. Maximum RPM was 7,000 but drivers generally kept to 6,500 during races. The torque curve was almost uniform between 3,000 and 6,000 rpm, giving the engine plenty of flexibility. The engine retained a cross plane crankshaft and the firing order was 1-5-4-8-6-3-7-2. Later M119HL engines were sourced from the Mercedes engine facility at Untertürkheim, supervised by Hermann Hiereth. The addition of 16 valve heads in 1989 took power up by about 20 hp (20 PS; 15 kW) to around 720 hp (730 PS; 537 kW) at 1.6 bar and 7,000 RPM. The increase in fuel efficiency meant absolute power could also be taken from just under 800 hp with 2.2 bar of boost to about 820 hp (831 PS; 611 kW).

== History ==
For its debut season in 1987, the cars were run by Kouros Racing, named after the fragrance brand of its parent company, Yves Saint Laurent, although backed by Mercedes-Benz in a semi-official capacity. The deal was to last five races. The team managed a mere twelfth in the teams standings, scoring points in only a single round. For 1988, the sponsorship deal with Kouros was not renewed and the team was renamed Sauber Mercedes. This coincided with a change of senior management at Mercedes and the announcement in January by new deputy chairman Prof. Dr Werner Niefer that the company would support Group C sportscars. As a result, Mercedes was sponsored by AEG-Olympia – AEG being owned by Daimler-Benz at the time, effectively giving the team full factory support. The team's management was bolstered by former BMW M team manager Jochen Neerpasch and Swiss former driver Max Welti. They managed to finish second in the championship behind the Jaguar XJR-9 with five wins for the season. Unfortunately at the 24 Hours of Le Mans, the team suffered an embarrassing setback when they were forced to withdraw due to concern over their Michelin tyres after Klaus Niedzwiedz suffered a blow out at high speed.

Finally, in 1989, the car was able to achieve great success. Besides replacing the black colour scheme with Mercedes' traditional plain silver scheme and reducing AEG to the role of minor sponsor, the older M117 5.0 L turbocharged V8 engine was upgraded to the M119, which replaced steel heads with new four-valve aluminium heads. The engine had a Group C capacity equivalence of 8.454 litres. The C9 was able to win all but one race in the 1989 season, including the 24 Hours of Le Mans. During qualifying, the Baldi/Acheson/Brancatelli C9 recorded a speed of 400 km/h (248 mph) on the Mulsanne Straight. In spite of this, it was the car of Schlesser/Jabouille/Cudini which occupied pole position on race day. The Sauber C9s would go on to finish first, second and fifth in the race. Mercedes driver Jean-Louis Schlesser would end up taking the driver's championship that season.

The C9 would be replaced by the Mercedes-Benz C11 from the second race onwards of the 1990 season, when it took one final win in the first race.

A total of 6 chassis were built.

== Achievements ==
The Sauber C9 did not enjoy a lot of success in 1987, its first season, finishing on only three occasions. The car's speed potential was made clear when Johnny Dumfries set a lap record at Le Mans before retiring with gearbox failure. Mike Thackwell also took pole position at Spa. Schlesser won the final race of the year, the non-championship Nurburgring Supercup, which was the only win in an otherwise bleak season for the Swiss-German team.

The C9 won five races in the 1988 World Sportscar Championship, showing much-improved reliability and placing second in the overall standings behind the winning Silk Cut Jaguar team. Drivers Schlesser, Baldi and Mass finished second, third and fifth respectively behind Jaguar's Martin Brundle in the driver's championship. In the 1989 World Sportscar Championship, the Sauber C9 won all except the second race at Dijon Prenois, where they were defeated by the Joest Porsche 962 of Bob Wollek and Frank Jelinski. Sauber drivers also filled the top four spots in the drivers standings with Schlesser winning the championship outright. High performance was only one notable aspect of the C9s ability; its reliability was another. The car failed to finish only twice in the 1989 season but on both occasions, the race was won by the other team car.

Reaching 400 km/h (248.0 mph) during the qualifying sessions of the 1989 24 Hours of Le Mans, the Sauber C9 proved to have one of the highest top speeds in the history of the competition at Le Mans. The C9's mark was only exceeded by the WM Peugeot P88, which achieved a speed of 405 km/h (251.1 mph) in the 1988 race, however both of these cars were purpose built to achieve a top speed record, with one vehicle retiring after only 13 laps, in stark contrast to the C9's bulletproof reliability over the whole of the 24 hours. These speeds led to the introduction of two chicanes on the Mulsanne Straight from 1990 onwards.

== Legacy ==
The car was awarded as Autosport Awards Racing Car of the Year for 1989.

The C9 appears in numerous video games including Gran Turismo and Forza Motorsport.

== Complete World Sportscar Championship results ==
Year	Entrant	Class	Drivers	No.	1	2	3	4	5	6	7	8	9	10	11	Points	WEMCP
1987	Kouros Mercedes	Group C			JAR	JER	MNZ	SIL	LMS	NOR	BHC	NÜR	SPA	FUJ		—N/a	—N/a
1987	Kouros Mercedes	Group C	(France) Henri Pescarolo	61				22								—N/a	—N/a
1987	Kouros Mercedes	Group C	(New Zealand) Mike Thackwell	61				22								—N/a	—N/a
1987	Formel Rennsportclub	Group C	(New Zealand) Mike Thackwell	61						21						—N/a	—N/a
1987	Formel Rennsportclub	Group C	(Germany) Manuel Reuter	61						21						—N/a	—N/a
1987	Kouros Racing	Group C	(France) Henri Pescarolo	61					27			22				—N/a	—N/a
1987	Kouros Racing	Group C	(Japan) Hideki Okada	61					27							—N/a	—N/a
1987	Kouros Racing	Group C	(United Kingdom) Johnny Dumfries	61								22				—N/a	—N/a
1987	Kouros Racing	Group C	(New Zealand) Mike Thackwell	61					27			22				—N/a	—N/a
1987	Kouros Racing	Group C	(New Zealand) Mike Thackwell	62					35							—N/a	—N/a
1987	Kouros Racing	Group C	(United States) Chip Ganassi	62					35							—N/a	—N/a
1987	Kouros Racing	Group C	(United Kingdom) Johnny Dumfries	62					35			DNS				—N/a	—N/a
1987	Kouros Racing	Group C	(Germany) Manuel Reuter	62								DNS				—N/a	—N/a
1988	Team Sauber Mercedes	Group C			JER	JAR	MNZ	SIL	LMS	BRN	BHC	NÜR	SPA	FUJ	SPK	275	2nd
1988	Team Sauber Mercedes	Group C	(France) Jean-Louis Schlesser	61	1	2	2	2			3	1	3	5	1	275	2nd
1988	Team Sauber Mercedes	Group C	(Germany) Jochen Mass	61	1		2	2	DNS			1	3	5	1	275	2nd
1988	Team Sauber Mercedes	Group C	(United Kingdom) James Weaver	61					DNS							275	2nd
1988	Team Sauber Mercedes	Group C	(United Kingdom) Kenny Acheson	61										5		275	2nd
1988	Team Sauber Mercedes	Group C	(Italy) Mauro Baldi	61	1	2	2		DNS		3					275	2nd
1988	Team Sauber Mercedes	Group C	(Italy) Mauro Baldi	62				3				23	1	25	2	275	2nd
1988	Team Sauber Mercedes	Group C	(United Kingdom) James Weaver	62				3								275	2nd
1988	Team Sauber Mercedes	Group C	(Germany) Jochen Mass	62					DNS	1	24					275	2nd
1988	Team Sauber Mercedes	Group C	(United Kingdom) Kenny Acheson	62					DNS							275	2nd
1988	Team Sauber Mercedes	Group C	(Germany) Klaus Niedzwiedz	62					DNS							275	2nd
1988	Team Sauber Mercedes	Group C	(France) Jean-Louis Schlesser	62						1	24					275	2nd
1988	Team Sauber Mercedes	Group C	(Sweden) Stefan Johansson	62								23	1		2	275	2nd
1988	Team Sauber Mercedes	Group C	(France) Philippe Streiff	62										25		275	2nd
1989	Team Sauber Mercedes	Group C			SUZ	DIJ	JAR	BHC	NÜR	DON	SPA	MEX				120	1st
1989	Team Sauber Mercedes	Group C	(Italy) Mauro Baldi	61	1	3	4	1	2	2	1	27				120	1st
1989	Team Sauber Mercedes	Group C	(France) Jean-Louis Schlesser	61	1											120	1st
1989	Team Sauber Mercedes	Group C	(United Kingdom) Kenny Acheson	61		3	4	1	2	2	1	27				120	1st
1989	Team Sauber Mercedes	Group C	(United Kingdom) Kenny Acheson	62	2											120	1st
1989	Team Sauber Mercedes	Group C	(France) Jean-Louis Schlesser	62		2	1	3	1	1	23	1				120	1st
1989	Team Sauber Mercedes	Group C	(Germany) Jochen Mass	62		2	1	3	1	1	23	1				120	1st
1990	Team Sauber Mercedes	Group C			SUZ	MNZ	SIL	SPA	DIJ	NUR	DON	MON	MEX			67.5 ^{1}	1st ^{1}
1990	Team Sauber Mercedes	Group C	(Italy) Mauro Baldi	1	1											67.5 ^{1}	1st ^{1}
1990	Team Sauber Mercedes	Group C	(France) Jean-Louis Schlesser	1	1											67.5 ^{1}	1st ^{1}
1990	Team Sauber Mercedes	Group C	(Germany) Jochen Mass	2	2											67.5 ^{1}	1st ^{1}
1990	Team Sauber Mercedes	Group C	(Austria) Karl Wendlinger	2	2											67.5 ^{1}	1st ^{1}

^1 Points also scored by the Sauber C11

== Gallery ==
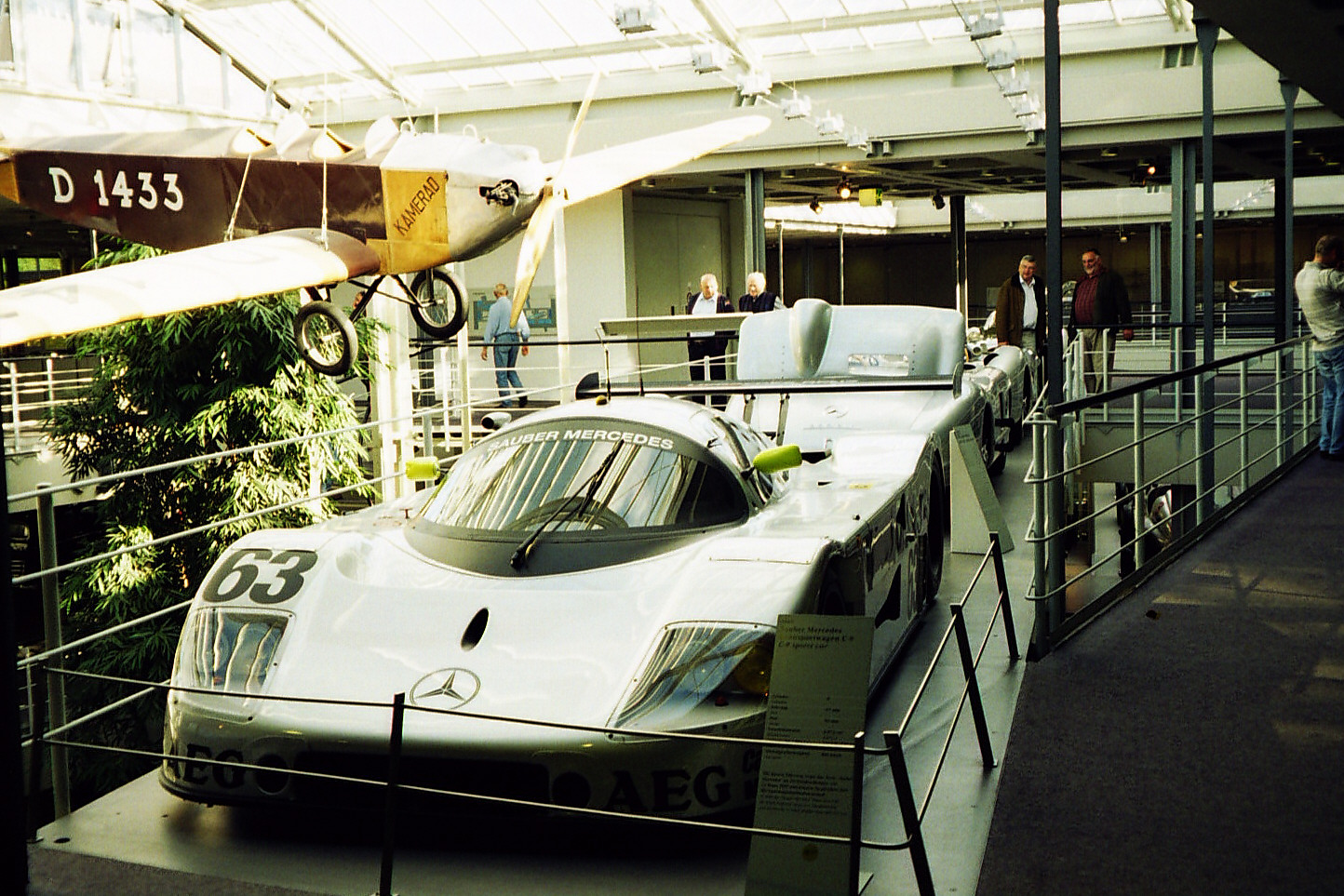
The 1989 24 Hours of Le Mans-winning #63 Sauber-Mercedes C9 on display in the Mercedes-Benz Museum.

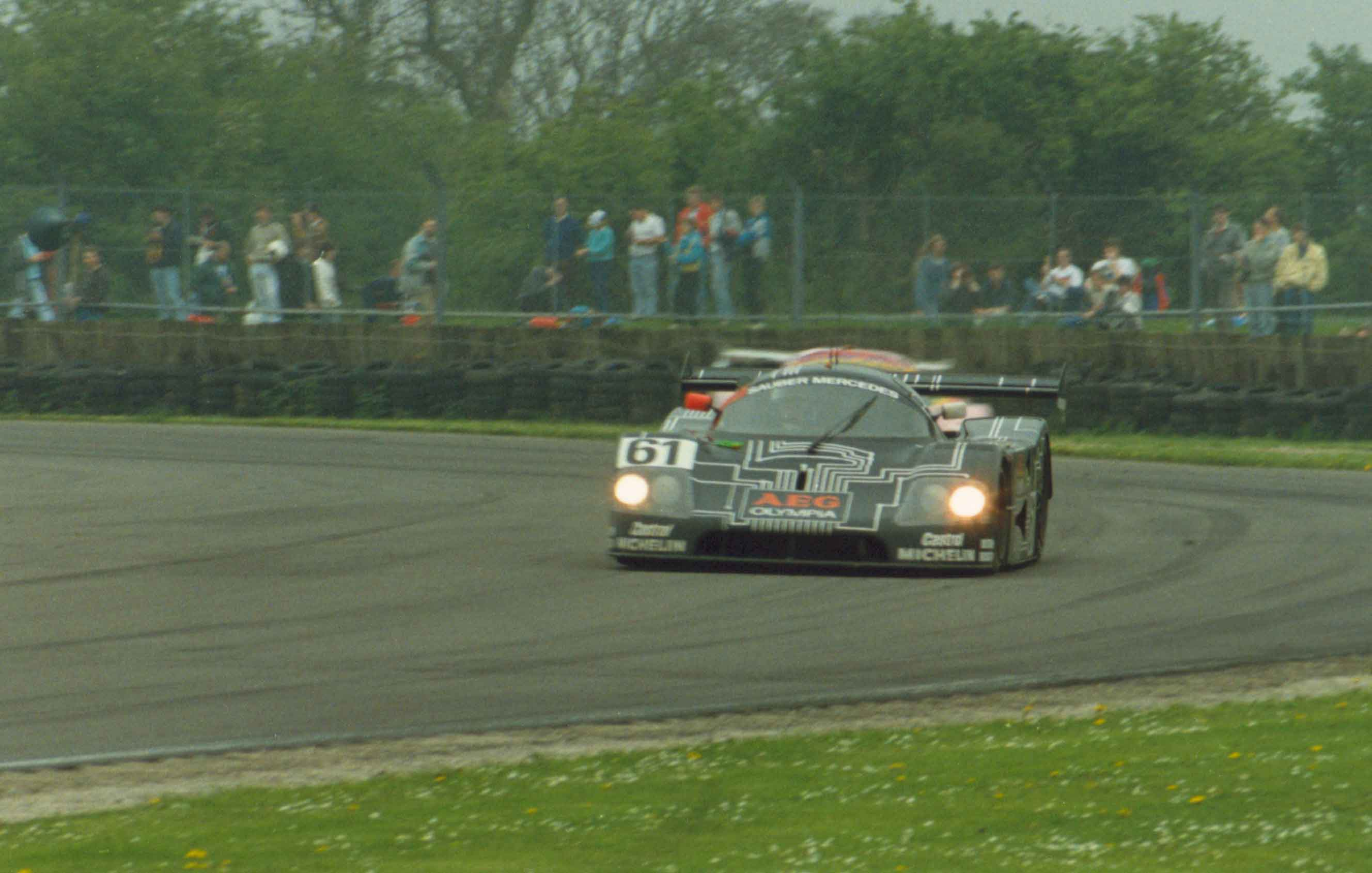
Sauber-Mercedes C9 rounding Becketts corner at Silverstone during the 1988 Silverstone 1000 km.

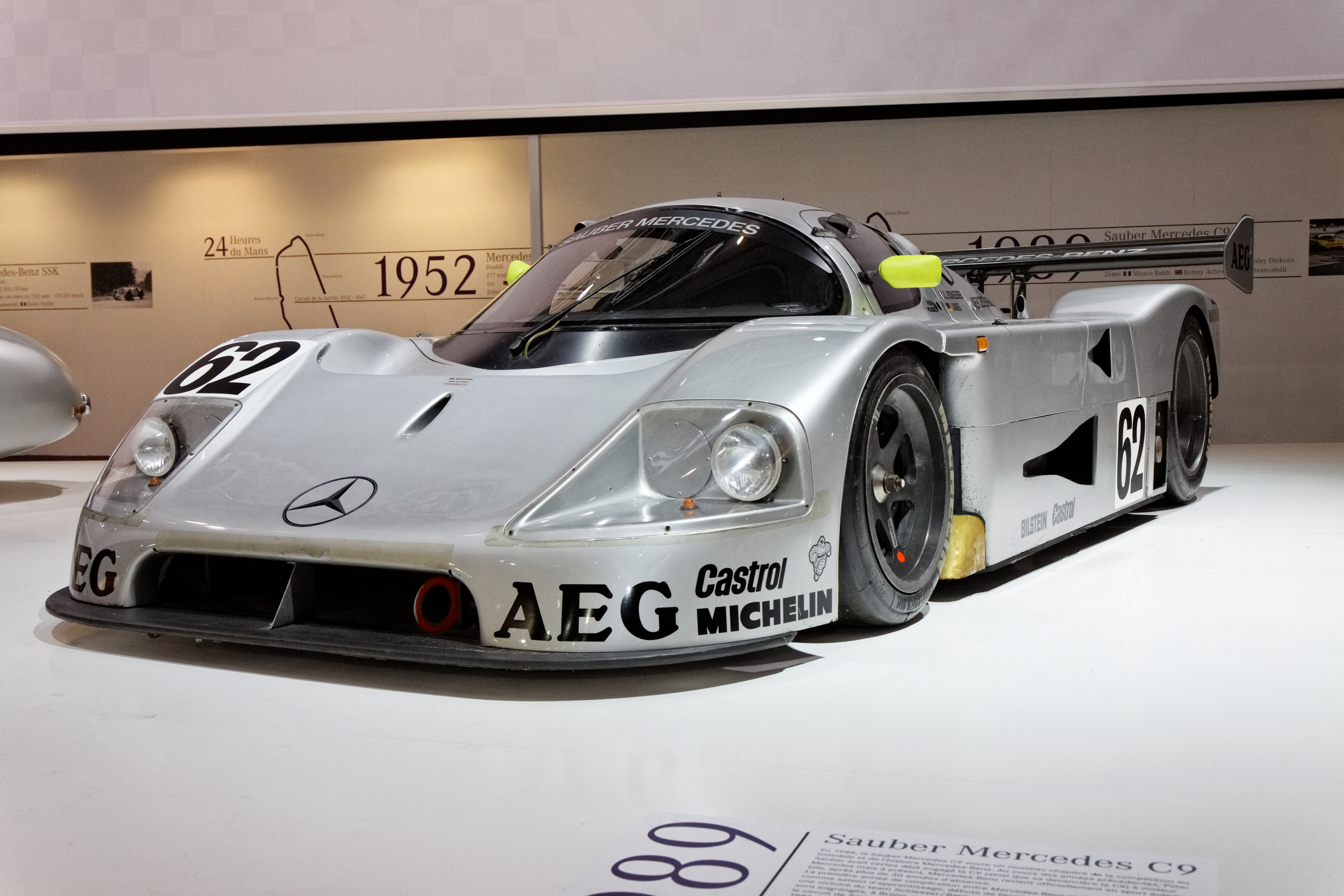
The 1989 C9 at the Paris Rétromobile show in 2012.

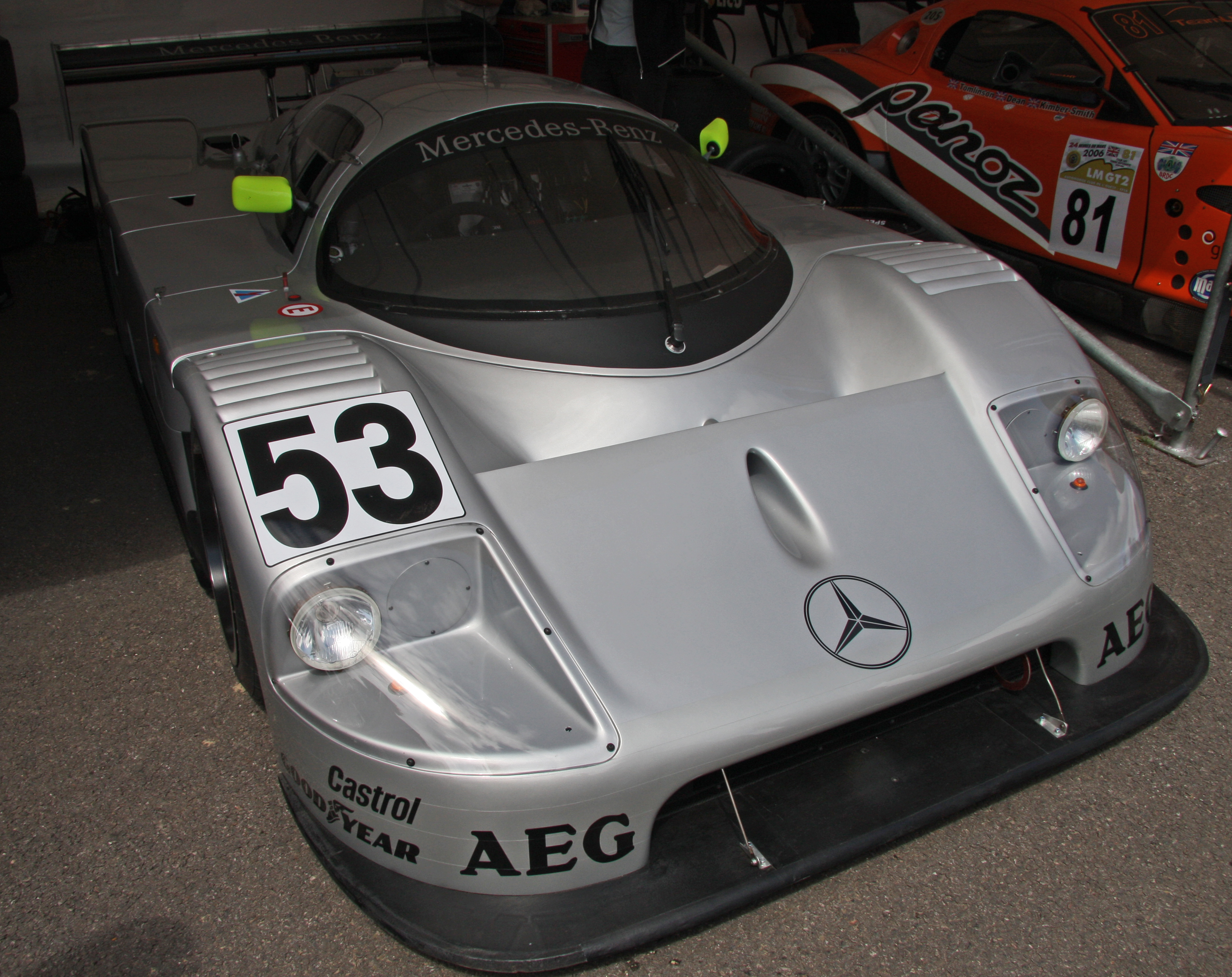
A Sauber-Mercedes C9 No. 53 car that raced in the 1000 km Nürburgring on show in 2008.

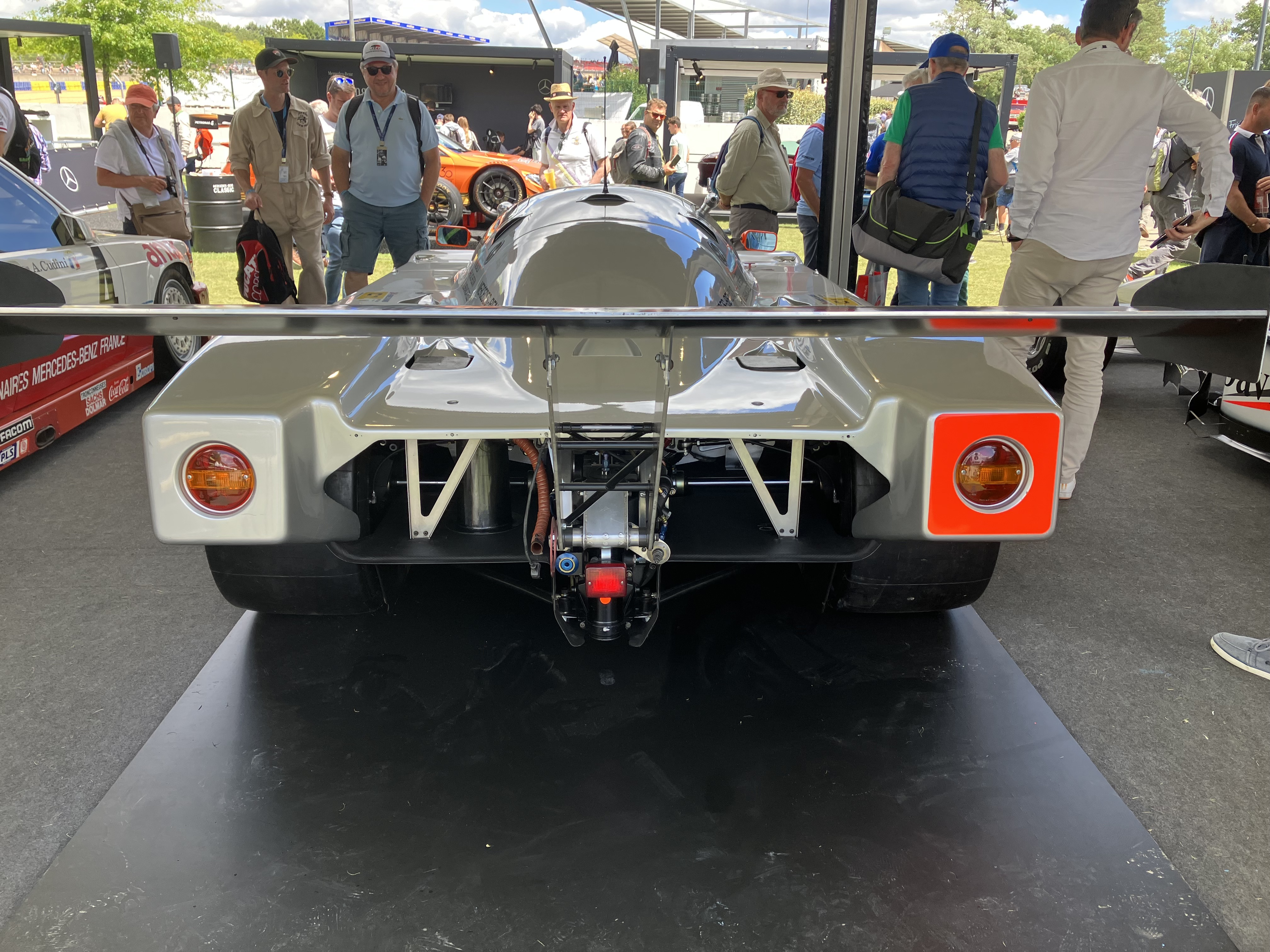
Rear view at the 2022 Le Mans Classic

== See also ==
- Mercedes-Benz motorsport

Awards
Preceded by McLaren MP4/4	Autosport; Racing Car Of The Year; 1989	Succeeded by Tyrrell 019
