= Spice SE88C =

Sports prototype race car

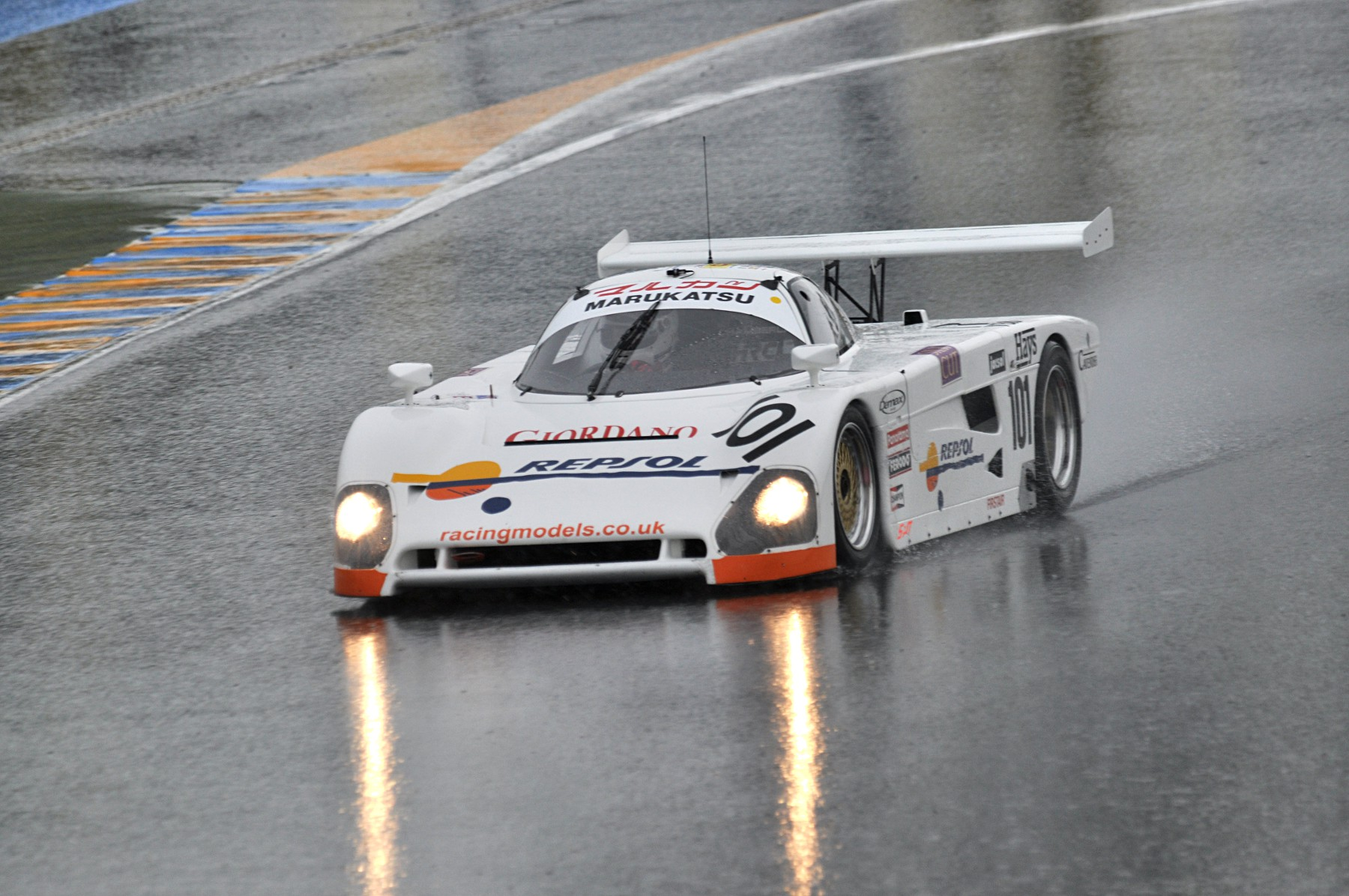
- Category: Group C2
- Designer: Graham Humphrey

Technical specifications
- Chassis: Aluminum honeycomb monocoque covered in carbon fiber composite and kevlar body
- Suspension (front): double wishbones, coil springs over shock absorbers, anti-roll bar
- Suspension (rear): double wishbones, rocker-actuated coil springs over shock absorbers, anti-roll bar
- Length: 4,600 mm (181 in)
- Width: 1,830 mm (72 in)
- Height: 1,042 mm (41 in)
- Axle track: 1,480 mm (58 in) (front); 1,460 mm (57 in)
- Wheelbase: 2,670 mm (105 in)
- Engine: Ford-Cosworth DFL/DFZ 3.3–3.9 L (201.4–238.0 cu in) 90° V8 DOHC naturally-aspirated mid-engined Ford SHO 3.4 L (207.5 cu in) 90° V8 DOHC naturally-aspirated mid-engined Super Duty 3.0 L (183.1 cu in) I4 OHV naturally-aspirated mid-engined Buick 4.5 L (274.6 cu in) 90° V6 OHV naturally-aspirated mid-engined Ferrari 3.5 L (213.6 cu in) 90° V8 DOHC twin-turbocharged mid-engined
- Transmission: Hewland DGB 5-speed manual
- Power: 350–540 hp (260–400 kW)
- Weight: 710 kg (1,565 lb)
- Brakes: AP Racing brake discs
- Tires: Avon; Goodyear

Competition history
- Debut: 1988 800 km of Jerez
Entries	Wins	Podiums	Poles
78	4	5	4

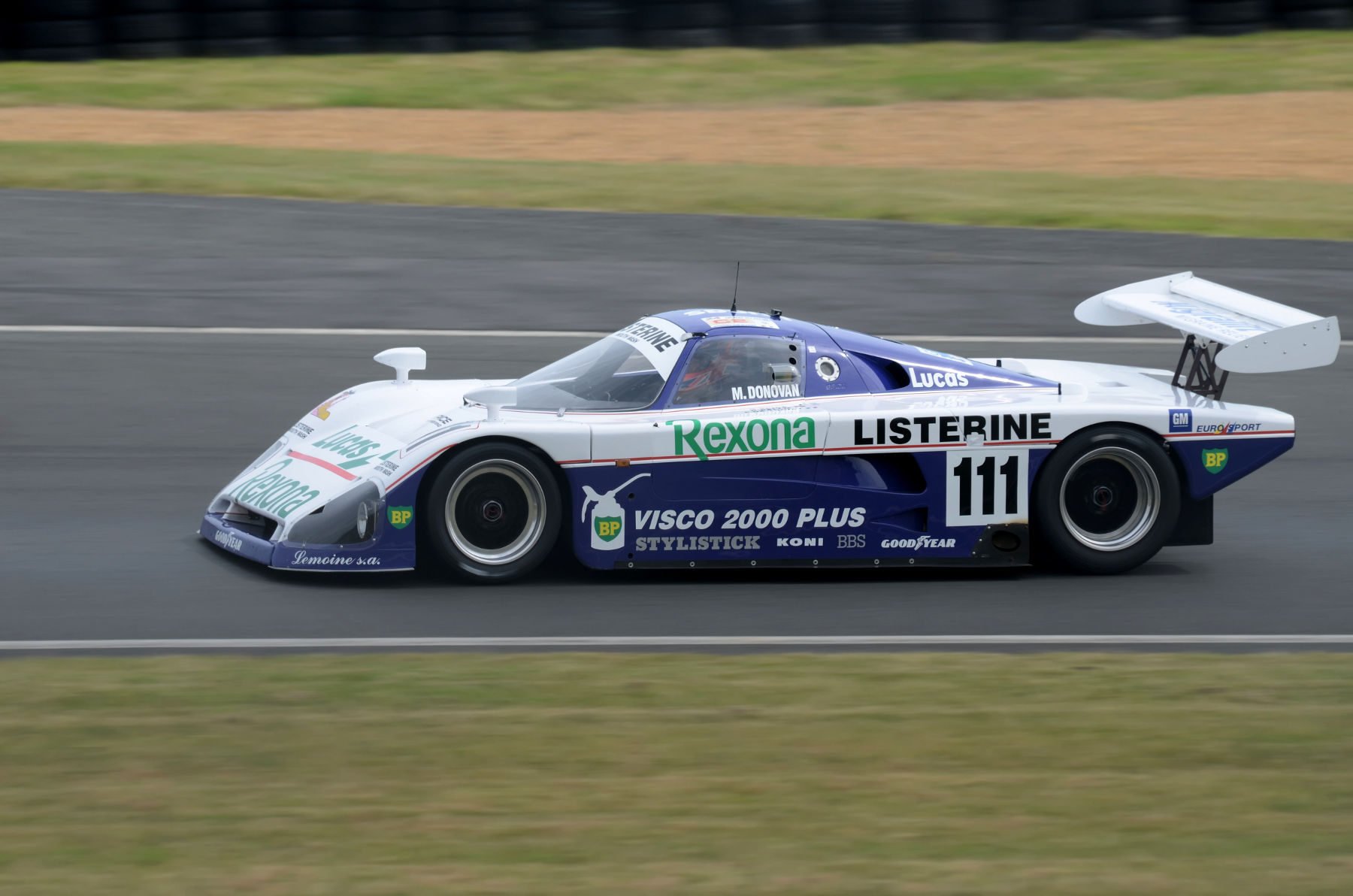
Spice SE88C competing at the 1988 24 Hours of Le Mans

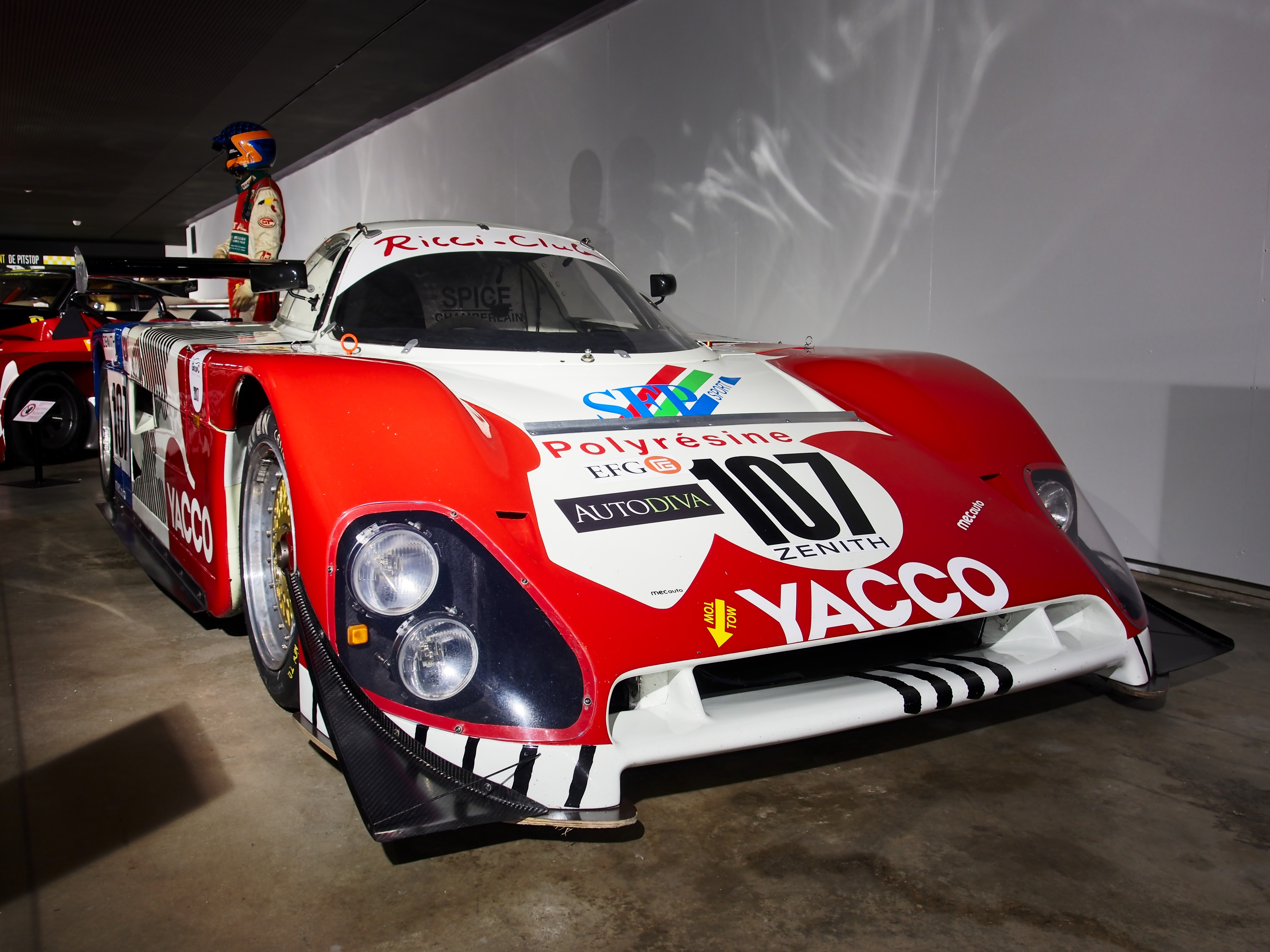
Spice SE88C Group C2 on display

The Spice SE88C is a Group C2 sports prototype race car, designed, developed, and built by British manufacturer, Spice Engineering, for sports car racing in the World Sportscar Championship, in 1988.
