= Tiga GC288 =

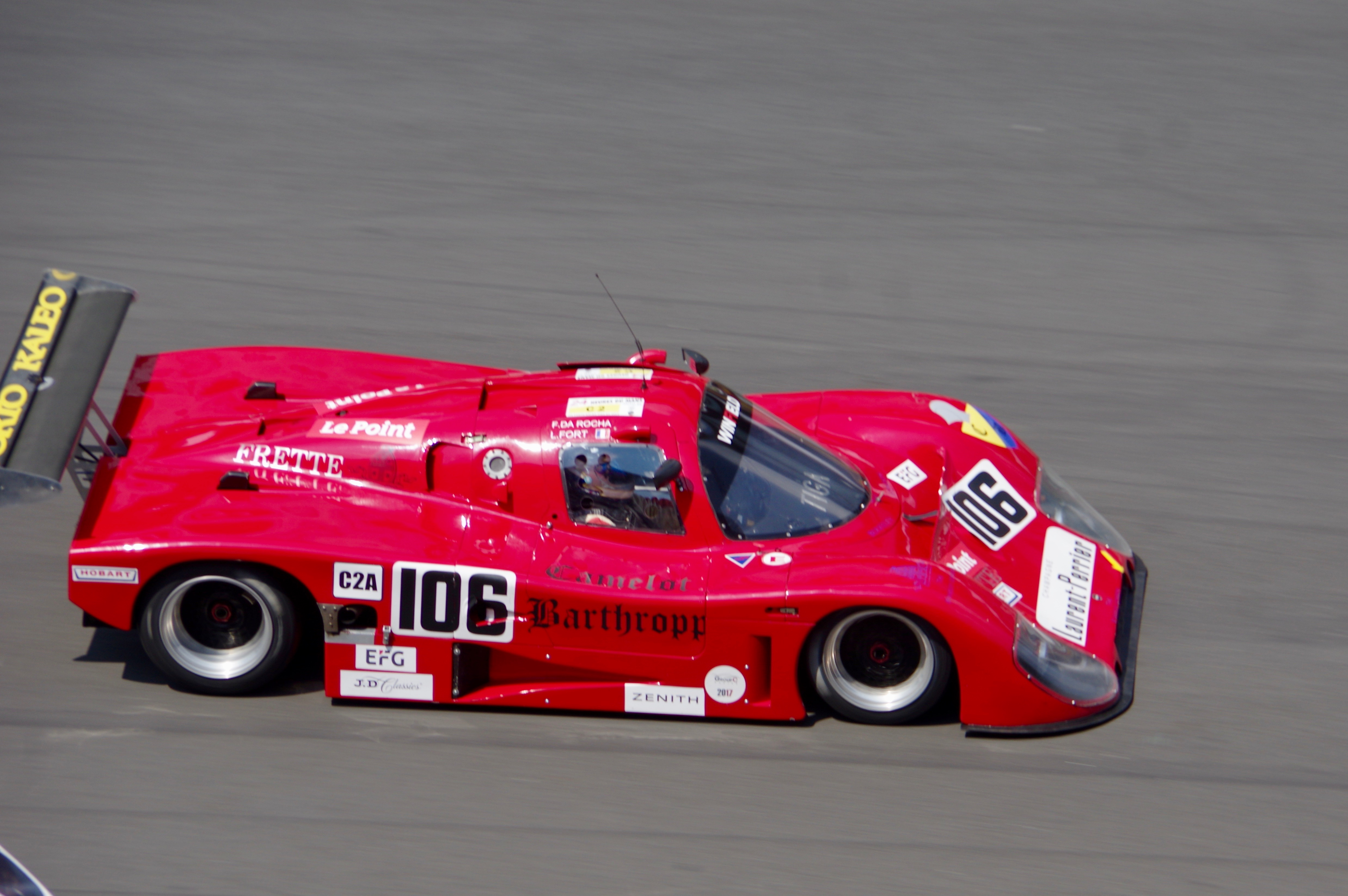
- Category: Group C2/IMSA GTP Lights

Technical specifications
- Chassis: Aluminum honeycomb monocoque, carbon-fiber composite/kevlar body
- Suspension: Double wishbones, pull-rod actuated coil springs and shock absorbers, anti-roll bar (front); Lower wishbones, top rockers actuating in-board mounted coil springs over shock absorbers, anti-roll bar (rear)
- Length: 4,410 mm (174 in)
- Width: 1,790 mm (70 in)
- Height: 1,000 mm (39 in)
- Axle track: 1,480 mm (58 in) (front); 1,626 mm (64.0 in) (rear)
- Wheelbase: 2,550 mm (100 in)
- Engine: Ford-Cosworth DFL 3.3 L (201.4 cu in) 90° DOHC V8 naturally-aspirated mid-engined Buick 4.5 L (274.6 cu in) 90° OHV V6 naturally-aspirated mid-engined
- Transmission: Hewland 5-speed manual
- Power: 465 hp (347 kW)
- Weight: 850 kg (1,870 lb)
- Tires: Avon; Goodyear

Competition history
- Debut: 1988 360 km of Jerez

The Tiga GC288 is a sports prototype race car, designed, developed, and built by British manufacturer Tiga Race Cars, for sports car racing, conforming to the Group C2/IMSA GTP Lights rules and regulations, in 1988.
