= 1989 480 km of Donington =

Layout of the Donington Park

The 1989 Wheatcroft Gold Cup was the sixth round of the 1989 World Sportscar Championship season. It took place at Donington Park, United Kingdom on 3 September 1989.

== Official results ==
Class winners in bold. Cars failing to complete 75% of winner's distance marked as Not Classified (NC).

Pos	Class	No	Team	Drivers	Chassis	Tyre	Laps
Pos	Class	No	Team	Drivers	Engine	Tyre	Laps
1	**C1**	**62**	**(West Germany) Team Sauber Mercedes**	**(France) Jean-Louis Schlesser (West Germany) Jochen Mass**	**Sauber C9**	MI	**120**
1	**C1**	**62**	**(West Germany) Team Sauber Mercedes**	**(France) Jean-Louis Schlesser (West Germany) Jochen Mass**	**Mercedes-Benz M119 5.0L V8**	MI	**120**
2	C1	61	(West Germany) Team Sauber Mercedes	(United Kingdom) Kenny Acheson (Italy) Mauro Baldi	Sauber C9	MI	120
2	C1	61	(West Germany) Team Sauber Mercedes	(United Kingdom) Kenny Acheson (Italy) Mauro Baldi	Mercedes-Benz M119 5.0L V8	MI	120
3	C1	23	(Japan) Nissan Motorsports International	(United Kingdom) Mark Blundell (United Kingdom) Julian Bailey	Nissan R89C	D	120
3	C1	23	(Japan) Nissan Motorsports International	(United Kingdom) Mark Blundell (United Kingdom) Julian Bailey	Nissan VRH35Z 3.5L Turbo V8	D	120
4	C1	7	(West Germany) Blaupunkt Sachs Joest Racing	(West Germany) Frank Jelinski (France) Bob Wollek	Porsche 962C	G	119
4	C1	7	(West Germany) Blaupunkt Sachs Joest Racing	(West Germany) Frank Jelinski (France) Bob Wollek	Porsche Type-935 3.0L Turbo Flat-6	G	119
5	C1	5	(Switzerland) Hydro Aluminium Brun Motorsport	(Norway) Harald Huysman (Argentina) Oscar Larrauri	Porsche 962C	Y	119
5	C1	5	(Switzerland) Hydro Aluminium Brun Motorsport	(Norway) Harald Huysman (Argentina) Oscar Larrauri	Porsche Type-935 3.0L Turbo Flat-6	Y	119
6	C1	19	(United Kingdom) Aston Martin (United Kingdom) Ecurie Ecosse	(United Kingdom) David Leslie (Republic of Ireland) Michael Roe	Aston Martin AMR1	G	118
6	C1	19	(United Kingdom) Aston Martin (United Kingdom) Ecurie Ecosse	(United Kingdom) David Leslie (Republic of Ireland) Michael Roe	Aston Martin RDP87 6.0L V8	G	118
7	C1	18	(United Kingdom) Aston Martin (United Kingdom) Ecurie Ecosse	(United Kingdom) David Sears (United Kingdom) Brian Redman	Aston Martin AMR1	G	118
7	C1	18	(United Kingdom) Aston Martin (United Kingdom) Ecurie Ecosse	(United Kingdom) David Sears (United Kingdom) Brian Redman	Aston Martin RDP87 6.0L V8	G	118
8	C1	8	(West Germany) Blaupunkt Sachs Joest Racing	(France) Henri Pescarolo (France) Jean-Louis Ricci	Porsche 962C	G	117
8	C1	8	(West Germany) Blaupunkt Sachs Joest Racing	(France) Henri Pescarolo (France) Jean-Louis Ricci	Porsche Type-935 3.0L Turbo Flat-6	G	117
9	C1	13	(France) Courage Compétition	(France) Pascal Fabre (Belgium) Hervé Regout	Cougar C22S	G	117
9	C1	13	(France) Courage Compétition	(France) Pascal Fabre (Belgium) Hervé Regout	Porsche Type-935 3.0L Turbo Flat-6	G	117
10	C1	37	(Japan) Toyota Team Tom's	(United Kingdom) Johnny Dumfries (United Kingdom) John Watson	Toyota 89C-V	B	116
10	C1	37	(Japan) Toyota Team Tom's	(United Kingdom) Johnny Dumfries (United Kingdom) John Watson	Toyota R32V 3.2L Turbo V8	B	116
11	C1	14	(United Kingdom) Richard Lloyd Racing	(United Kingdom) Tiff Needell (United Kingdom) Derek Bell	Porsche 962C GTi	G	115
11	C1	14	(United Kingdom) Richard Lloyd Racing	(United Kingdom) Tiff Needell (United Kingdom) Derek Bell	Porsche Type-935 3.0L Turbo Flat-6	G	115
12	C1	10	(Germany) Porsche Kremer Racing	(South Africa) George Fouché (Italy) Giovanni Lavaggi	Porsche 962CK6	Y	114
12	C1	10	(Germany) Porsche Kremer Racing	(South Africa) George Fouché (Italy) Giovanni Lavaggi	Porsche Type-935 3.0L Turbo Flat-6	Y	114
13	**C2**	**107**	**(United Kingdom) Tiga Racing Team**	**(Finland) Jari Nurminen (United Kingdom) Tony Trevor**	**Tiga GC289**	G	**114**
13	**C2**	**107**	**(United Kingdom) Tiga Racing Team**	**(Finland) Jari Nurminen (United Kingdom) Tony Trevor**	**Ford Cosworth DFL 3.3L V8**	G	**114**
14	C2	171	(United Kingdom) Team Mako	(United Kingdom) James Shead (Canada) Robbie Stirling	Spice SE88C	G	114
14	C2	171	(United Kingdom) Team Mako	(United Kingdom) James Shead (Canada) Robbie Stirling	Ford Cosworth DFL 3.3L V8	G	114
15	C2	101	(United Kingdom) Chamberlain Engineering	(Spain) Fermín Velez (United Kingdom) Nick Adams	Spice SE89C	G	113
15	C2	101	(United Kingdom) Chamberlain Engineering	(Spain) Fermín Velez (United Kingdom) Nick Adams	Ford Cosworth DFL 3.3L V8	G	113
16	C1	40	(Switzerland) Swiss Team Salamin	(Switzerland) Antoine Salamin (Morocco) Max Cohen-Olivar	Porsche 962C	G	110
16	C1	40	(Switzerland) Swiss Team Salamin	(Switzerland) Antoine Salamin (Morocco) Max Cohen-Olivar	Porsche Type-935 3.0L Turbo Flat-6	G	110
17 NC^{†}	GTP	201	(Japan) Mazdaspeed	(Belgium) Pierre Dieudonné (Republic of Ireland) David Kennedy	Mazda 767B	D	111
17 NC^{†}	GTP	201	(Japan) Mazdaspeed	(Belgium) Pierre Dieudonné (Republic of Ireland) David Kennedy	Mazda 13J 2.6L 4-Rotor	D	111
18 NC^{†}	C2	108	(United Kingdom) Roy Baker Racing (United Kingdom) GP Motorsport	(France) Philippe de Henning (United Kingdom) Dudley Wood	Spice SE87C	G	108
18 NC^{†}	C2	108	(United Kingdom) Roy Baker Racing (United Kingdom) GP Motorsport	(France) Philippe de Henning (United Kingdom) Dudley Wood	Ford Cosworth DFL 3.3L V8	G	108
19 DNF	C1	2	(United Kingdom) Silk Cut Jaguar	(France) Alain Ferté (United Kingdom) Andy Wallace	Jaguar XJR-11	D	115
19 DNF	C1	2	(United Kingdom) Silk Cut Jaguar	(France) Alain Ferté (United Kingdom) Andy Wallace	Jaguar JV6 3.5L Turbo V6	D	115
20 DNF	C2	151	(Switzerland) Pierre-Alain Lombardi	(Switzerland) Pierre-Alain Lombardi (France) Bruno Sotty	Spice SE86C	G	107
20 DNF	C2	151	(Switzerland) Pierre-Alain Lombardi	(Switzerland) Pierre-Alain Lombardi (France) Bruno Sotty	Ford Cosworth DFL 3.3L V8	G	107
21 DNF	C2	111	(United Kingdom) PC Automotive	(United Kingdom) Richard Piper (United States) Olindo Iacobelli	Spice SE88C	G	106
21 DNF	C2	111	(United Kingdom) PC Automotive	(United Kingdom) Richard Piper (United States) Olindo Iacobelli	Ford Cosworth DFL 3.3L V8	G	106
22 DNF	C2	102	(United Kingdom) Chamberlain Engineering	(Italy) Luigi Taverna (United Kingdom) John Williams	Spice SE86C	G	101
22 DNF	C2	102	(United Kingdom) Chamberlain Engineering	(Italy) Luigi Taverna (United Kingdom) John Williams	Hart 418T 1.8L Turbo I4	G	101
23 DNF	C1	26	France Prototeam	(France) Claude Ballot-Léna (Switzerland) Bernard Thuner	Spice SE88C	G	91
23 DNF	C1	26	France Prototeam	(France) Claude Ballot-Léna (Switzerland) Bernard Thuner	Ford Cosworth DFZ 3.5L V8	G	91
24 DNF	C2	178	(France) Didier Bonnet	(France) Joel Aulen (France) Gérard Tremblay	Tiga GC289	G	68
24 DNF	C2	178	(France) Didier Bonnet	(France) Joel Aulen (France) Gérard Tremblay	Ford Cosworth DFL 3.3L V8	G	68
25 DNF	C1	21	(United Kingdom) Spice Engineering	(Chile) Eliseo Salazar (United Kingdom) Tim Harvey	Spice SE89C	G	66
25 DNF	C1	21	(United Kingdom) Spice Engineering	(Chile) Eliseo Salazar (United Kingdom) Tim Harvey	Ford Cosworth DFZ 3.5L V8	G	66
26 DNF	C1	6	(Switzerland) Repsol Brun Motorsport	(Switzerland) Walter Brun (Spain) Jésus Pareja	Porsche 962C	Y	49
26 DNF	C1	6	(Switzerland) Repsol Brun Motorsport	(Switzerland) Walter Brun (Spain) Jésus Pareja	Porsche Type-935 3.0L Turbo Flat-6	Y	49
27 DNF	C1	1	(United Kingdom) Silk Cut Jaguar	(Netherlands) Jan Lammers (France) Patrick Tambay	Jaguar XJR-11	D	45
27 DNF	C1	1	(United Kingdom) Silk Cut Jaguar	(Netherlands) Jan Lammers (France) Patrick Tambay	Jaguar JV6 3.5L Turbo V6	D	45
28 DNF	C1	22	(United Kingdom) Spice Engineering	(South Africa) Wayne Taylor (Denmark) Thorkild Thyrring	Spice SE89C	G	42
28 DNF	C1	22	(United Kingdom) Spice Engineering	(South Africa) Wayne Taylor (Denmark) Thorkild Thyrring	Ford Cosworth DFZ 3.5L V8	G	42
29 DNF	C1	16	(Switzerland) Hydro Aluminium Brun Motorsport	(Sweden) Stanley Dickens (West Germany) Uwe Schäfer	Porsche 962C	Y	29
29 DNF	C1	16	(Switzerland) Hydro Aluminium Brun Motorsport	(Sweden) Stanley Dickens (West Germany) Uwe Schäfer	Porsche Type-935 3.0L Turbo Flat-6	Y	29
30 DNF	C1	29	(Italy) Mussato Action Car	(Italy) Bruno Giacomelli (Italy) Franco Scapini	Lancia LC2	D	28
30 DNF	C1	29	(Italy) Mussato Action Car	(Italy) Bruno Giacomelli (Italy) Franco Scapini	Ferrari 308C 3.0L Turbo V8	D	28
31 DNF	C2	177	(France) Automobiles Louis Descartes	(France) Marc Fontan (France) Alain Serpaggi	ALD C289	G	24
31 DNF	C2	177	(France) Automobiles Louis Descartes	(France) Marc Fontan (France) Alain Serpaggi	Ford Cosworth 3.3L V8	G	24
32 DNF	C2	106	(Italy) Porto Kaleo Team	(Italy) Ranieri Randaccio (Italy) Pasquale Barberio	Tiga GC288/9	G	17
32 DNF	C2	106	(Italy) Porto Kaleo Team	(Italy) Ranieri Randaccio (Italy) Pasquale Barberio	Ford Cosworth 3.3L V8	G	17
33 DNF	C2	105	(Italy) Porto Kaleo Team (United Kingdom) Roy Baker Racing	(Italy) Stefano Sebastiani (United Kingdom) Mike Kimpton	Tiga GC289	G	0
33 DNF	C2	105	(Italy) Porto Kaleo Team (United Kingdom) Roy Baker Racing	(Italy) Stefano Sebastiani (United Kingdom) Mike Kimpton	Ford Cosworth 3.3L V8	G	0
DNS	C1	17	(West Germany) Dauer Racing	(West Germany) Jochen Dauer (United Kingdom) Will Hoy	Porsche 962C	G	-
DNS	C1	17	(West Germany) Dauer Racing	(West Germany) Jochen Dauer (United Kingdom) Will Hoy	Porsche Type-935 3.0L Turbo Flat-6	G	-
DNS	C1	20	(United Kingdom) Team Davey	(United Kingdom) Tim Lee-Davey	Porsche 962C	D	-
DNS	C1	20	(United Kingdom) Team Davey	(United Kingdom) Tim Lee-Davey	Porsche Type-935 3.0L Turbo Flat-6	D	-

† – #201 Mazdaspeed and #181 Roy Baker Racing were not classified due to completing the final lap of the race at too slow of a pace.

== Statistics ==
- Pole position – #61 Team Sauber Mercedes – 1:19.123
- Fastest lap – #23 Nissan Motorsports International – 1:24.500
- Average speed – 162.882 km/h

World Sportscar Championship
Previous race: 1989 480km of Nürburgring	1989 season	Next race: 1989 480km of Spa
