= 1989 480 km of Spa =

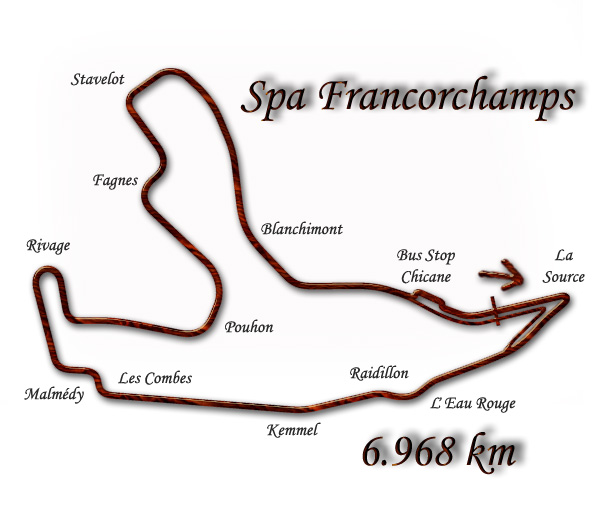
Layout of the Circuit de Spa-Francorchamps (1981–1993, 1995–2003)

The 1989 Coupes de Spa was the seventh round of the 1989 World Sportscar Championship season. It took place at the Circuit de Spa-Francorchamps, Belgium on September 17, 1989.

== Official results ==
Class winners in bold. Cars failing to complete 75% of winner's distance marked as Not Classified (NC).

Pos	Class	No	Team	Drivers	Chassis	Tyre	Laps
Pos	Class	No	Team	Drivers	Engine	Tyre	Laps
1	**C1**	**61**	**(West Germany) Team Sauber Mercedes**	**(United Kingdom) Kenny Acheson (Italy) Mauro Baldi**	**Sauber C9**	MI	**70**
1	**C1**	**61**	**(West Germany) Team Sauber Mercedes**	**(United Kingdom) Kenny Acheson (Italy) Mauro Baldi**	**Mercedes-Benz M119 5.0L Turbo V8**	MI	**70**
2	C1	7	(West Germany) Joest Racing	(West Germany) Frank Jelinski (France) Bob Wollek	Porsche 962C	G	70
2	C1	7	(West Germany) Joest Racing	(West Germany) Frank Jelinski (France) Bob Wollek	Porsche Type-935 3.0L Turbo Flat-6	G	70
3	C1	23	(Japan) Nissan Motorsports International	(United Kingdom) Mark Blundell (United Kingdom) Julian Bailey	Nissan R89C	D	69
3	C1	23	(Japan) Nissan Motorsports International	(United Kingdom) Mark Blundell (United Kingdom) Julian Bailey	Nissan VRH35Z 3.5L Turbo V8	D	69
4	C1	16	(Switzerland) Repsol Brun Motorsport	(Argentina) Oscar Larrauri (Austria) Roland Ratzenberger	Porsche 962C	Y	68
4	C1	16	(Switzerland) Repsol Brun Motorsport	(Argentina) Oscar Larrauri (Austria) Roland Ratzenberger	Porsche Type-935 3.0L Turbo Flat-6	Y	68
5	C1	22	(United Kingdom) Spice Engineering	(South Africa) Wayne Taylor (Denmark) Thorkild Thyrring	Spice SE89C	G	68
5	C1	22	(United Kingdom) Spice Engineering	(South Africa) Wayne Taylor (Denmark) Thorkild Thyrring	Ford Cosworth DFZ 3.5L V8	G	68
6	C1	8	(West Germany) Joest Racing	(France) Henri Pescarolo (France) Jean-Louis Ricci	Porsche 962C	G	68
6	C1	8	(West Germany) Joest Racing	(France) Henri Pescarolo (France) Jean-Louis Ricci	Porsche Type-935 3.0L Turbo Flat-6	G	68
7	C1	18	(United Kingdom) Aston Martin (United Kingdom) Ecurie Ecosse	(Sweden) Stanley Dickens (United Kingdom) Brian Redman	Aston Martin AMR1	G	67
7	C1	18	(United Kingdom) Aston Martin (United Kingdom) Ecurie Ecosse	(Sweden) Stanley Dickens (United Kingdom) Brian Redman	Aston Martin RDP87 6.3L V8	G	67
8	C1	37	(Japan) Toyota Team Tom's	(United Kingdom) Johnny Dumfries (United Kingdom) Geoff Lees	Toyota 89C-V	B	67
8	C1	37	(Japan) Toyota Team Tom's	(United Kingdom) Johnny Dumfries (United Kingdom) Geoff Lees	Toyota R32V 3.2L Turbo V8	B	67
9	**GTP**	**201**	**(Japan) Mazdaspeed**	**(Belgium) Pierre Dieudonné (Republic of Ireland) David Kennedy**	**Mazda 767B**	D	**67**
9	**GTP**	**201**	**(Japan) Mazdaspeed**	**(Belgium) Pierre Dieudonné (Republic of Ireland) David Kennedy**	**Mazda 13J 2.6L 4-Rotor**	D	**67**
10	C1	10	(West Germany) Porsche Kremer Racing	(South Africa) George Fouché (Italy) Giovanni Lavaggi	Porsche 962CK6	Y	66
10	C1	10	(West Germany) Porsche Kremer Racing	(South Africa) George Fouché (Italy) Giovanni Lavaggi	Porsche Type-935 3.0L Turbo Flat-6	Y	66
11	**C2**	**171**	**(United Kingdom) Team Mako**	**(United Kingdom) James Shead (Canada) Robbie Stirling**	**Spice SE88C**	G	**65**
11	**C2**	**171**	**(United Kingdom) Team Mako**	**(United Kingdom) James Shead (Canada) Robbie Stirling**	**Ford Cosworth DFL 3.3L V8**	G	**65**
12	C1	72	(West Germany) Obermaier Primagaz	(West Germany) Jürgen Lässig (France) Pierre Yver	Porsche 962C	G	65
12	C1	72	(West Germany) Obermaier Primagaz	(West Germany) Jürgen Lässig (France) Pierre Yver	Porsche Type-935 3.0L Turbo Flat-6	G	65
13	C2	101	(United Kingdom) Chamberlain Engineering	(Spain) Fermín Velez (United Kingdom) Nick Adams	Spice SE89C	G	64
13	C2	101	(United Kingdom) Chamberlain Engineering	(Spain) Fermín Velez (United Kingdom) Nick Adams	Ford Cosworth DFL 3.3L V8	G	64
14	C2	111	(United Kingdom) PC Automotive	(United Kingdom) Richard Piper (United States) Olindo Iacobelli	Spice SE88C	G	64
14	C2	111	(United Kingdom) PC Automotive	(United Kingdom) Richard Piper (United States) Olindo Iacobelli	Ford Cosworth DFL 3.3L V8	G	64
15	C2	106	(Italy) Porto Kaleo Team	(Italy) Ranieri Randaccio (Italy) Pasquale Barberio	Tiga GC288/9	G	64
15	C2	106	(Italy) Porto Kaleo Team	(Italy) Ranieri Randaccio (Italy) Pasquale Barberio	Ford Cosworth 3.3L V8	G	64
16	C1	40	(Switzerland) Swiss Team Salamin	(Switzerland) Antoine Salamin (Morocco) Max Cohen-Olivar	Porsche 962C	G	61
16	C1	40	(Switzerland) Swiss Team Salamin	(Switzerland) Antoine Salamin (Morocco) Max Cohen-Olivar	Porsche Type-935 3.0L Turbo Flat-6	G	61
17	C2	177	(France) Automobiles Louis Descartes	(France) Marc Fontan (France) Alain Serpaggi	ALD C289	G	61
17	C2	177	(France) Automobiles Louis Descartes	(France) Marc Fontan (France) Alain Serpaggi	Ford Cosworth 3.3L V8	G	61
18	C2	108	(United Kingdom) Roy Baker Racing (United Kingdom) GP Motorsport	(France) Philippe de Henning	Spice SE87C	G	60
18	C2	108	(United Kingdom) Roy Baker Racing (United Kingdom) GP Motorsport	(France) Philippe de Henning	Ford Cosworth DFL 3.3L V8	G	60
19	C2	105	(Italy) Porto Kaleo Team	(Italy) Stefano Sebastiani (Switzerland) Jean-Pierre Frey	Tiga GC289	G	59
19	C2	105	(Italy) Porto Kaleo Team	(Italy) Stefano Sebastiani (Switzerland) Jean-Pierre Frey	Ford Cosworth 3.3L V8	G	59
20	C2	178	(France) Didier Bonnet	(France) Patrick Oudet (France) Gérard Tremblay	Tiga GC289	G	59
20	C2	178	(France) Didier Bonnet	(France) Patrick Oudet (France) Gérard Tremblay	Ford Cosworth DFL 3.3L V8	G	59
21	C1	34	(France) Porsche Alméras Montpellier	(France) Jacques Alméras (France) Jean-Marie Alméras	Porsche 962C	G	54
21	C1	34	(France) Porsche Alméras Montpellier	(France) Jacques Alméras (France) Jean-Marie Alméras	Porsche Type-935 3.0L Turbo Flat-6	G	54
22	C2	176	(France) Automobiles Louis Descartes	(France) François Wettling (France) Thierry Lecerf	ALD C2	G	50
22	C2	176	(France) Automobiles Louis Descartes	(France) François Wettling (France) Thierry Lecerf	BMW M80 3.5L I6	G	50
23 DNF	C1	62	(West Germany) Team Sauber Mercedes	(France) Jean-Louis Schlesser (West Germany) Jochen Mass	Sauber C9	MI	69
23 DNF	C1	62	(West Germany) Team Sauber Mercedes	(France) Jean-Louis Schlesser (West Germany) Jochen Mass	Mercedes-Benz M119 5.0L V8	MI	69
24 DNF	C1	6	(Switzerland) Repsol Brun Motorsport	(Switzerland) Walter Brun (Spain) Jésus Pareja	Porsche 962C	Y	62
24 DNF	C1	6	(Switzerland) Repsol Brun Motorsport	(Switzerland) Walter Brun (Spain) Jésus Pareja	Porsche Type-935 3.0L Turbo Flat-6	Y	62
25 DNF	C1	21	(United Kingdom) Spice Engineering	(Chile) Eliseo Salazar (United Kingdom) Ray Bellm	Spice SE89C	G	53
25 DNF	C1	21	(United Kingdom) Spice Engineering	(Chile) Eliseo Salazar (United Kingdom) Ray Bellm	Ford Cosworth DFZ 3.5L V8	G	53
26 DNF	C2	102	(United Kingdom) Chamberlain Engineering	(Italy) Luigi Taverna (Netherlands) Hendrik ten Cate	Spice SE86C	G	51
26 DNF	C2	102	(United Kingdom) Chamberlain Engineering	(Italy) Luigi Taverna (Netherlands) Hendrik ten Cate	Hart 418T 1.8L Turbo I4	G	51
27 DNF	C1	13	(France) Courage Compétition	(France) Pascal Fabre (Belgium) Hervé Regout	Cougar C22S	G	45
27 DNF	C1	13	(France) Courage Compétition	(France) Pascal Fabre (Belgium) Hervé Regout	Porsche Type-935 3.0L Turbo Flat-6	G	45
28 DNF	C1	19	(United Kingdom) Aston Martin (United Kingdom) Ecurie Ecosse	(United Kingdom) David Leslie (Republic of Ireland) Michael Roe	Aston Martin AMR1	G	43
28 DNF	C1	19	(United Kingdom) Aston Martin (United Kingdom) Ecurie Ecosse	(United Kingdom) David Leslie (Republic of Ireland) Michael Roe	Aston Martin RDP87 6.3L V8	G	43
29 DNF	C2	107	(United Kingdom) Tiga Racing Team	(Finland) Jari Nurminen (Italy) Carlo Rossi	Tiga GC289	G	36
29 DNF	C2	107	(United Kingdom) Tiga Racing Team	(Finland) Jari Nurminen (Italy) Carlo Rossi	Ford Cosworth DFL 3.3L V8	G	36
30 DNF	C2	151	(Switzerland) Pierre-Alain Lombardi	(Switzerland) Pierre-Alain Lombardi (France) Bruno Sotty	Spice SE86C	G	33
30 DNF	C2	151	(Switzerland) Pierre-Alain Lombardi	(Switzerland) Pierre-Alain Lombardi (France) Bruno Sotty	Ford Cosworth DFZ 3.5L V8	G	33
31 DNF	C2	103	France Prototeam	(France) Claude Ballot-Léna (Switzerland) Bernard Thuner	Spice SE88C	G	26
31 DNF	C2	103	France Prototeam	(France) Claude Ballot-Léna (Switzerland) Bernard Thuner	Ford Cosworth DFL 3.3L V8	G	26
32 DNF	C1	2	(United Kingdom) Silk Cut Jaguar	(Denmark) John Nielsen (United Kingdom) Andy Wallace	Jaguar XJR-11	D	25
32 DNF	C1	2	(United Kingdom) Silk Cut Jaguar	(Denmark) John Nielsen (United Kingdom) Andy Wallace	Jaguar JV6 3.5L Turbo V6	D	25
33 DNF	C1	20	(United Kingdom) Team Davey	(United Kingdom) Tim Lee-Davey (Australia) Vern Schuppan	Porsche 962C	D	19
33 DNF	C1	20	(United Kingdom) Team Davey	(United Kingdom) Tim Lee-Davey (Australia) Vern Schuppan	Porsche Type-935 3.0L Turbo Flat-6	D	19
34 DNF	C1	1	(United Kingdom) Silk Cut Jaguar	(Netherlands) Jan Lammers (France) Patrick Tambay	Jaguar XJR-11	D	16
34 DNF	C1	1	(United Kingdom) Silk Cut Jaguar	(Netherlands) Jan Lammers (France) Patrick Tambay	Jaguar JV6 3.5L Turbo V6	D	16
35 DNF	C1	14	(United Kingdom) Richard Lloyd Racing	(United Kingdom) Tiff Needell (Sweden) Steven Andskär	Porsche 962C GTi	G	15
35 DNF	C1	14	(United Kingdom) Richard Lloyd Racing	(United Kingdom) Tiff Needell (Sweden) Steven Andskär	Porsche Type-935 3.0L Turbo Flat-6	G	15
36 DNF	C1	29	(Italy) Mussato Action Car	(Italy) Bruno Giacomelli (Italy) Franco Scapini	Lancia LC2	D	12
36 DNF	C1	29	(Italy) Mussato Action Car	(Italy) Bruno Giacomelli (Italy) Franco Scapini	Ferrari 308C 3.0L Turbo V8	D	12
37 DNF	C1	5	(Switzerland) Repsol Brun Motorsport	(Norway) Harald Huysman (Germany) Uwe Schäfer	Porsche 962C	Y	10
37 DNF	C1	5	(Switzerland) Repsol Brun Motorsport	(Norway) Harald Huysman (Germany) Uwe Schäfer	Porsche Type-935 3.0L Turbo Flat-6	Y	10
38 DNF	C1	17	(West Germany) Dauer Racing	(West Germany) Jochen Dauer	Porsche 962C	G	8
38 DNF	C1	17	(West Germany) Dauer Racing	(West Germany) Jochen Dauer	Porsche Type-935 3.0L Turbo Flat-6	G	8

== Statistics ==
- Pole position - #61 Team Sauber Mercedes - 2:05.900
- Fastest lap - #61 Team Sauber Mercedes - 2:07.863
- Average speed - 183.005 km/h

World Sportscar Championship
Previous race: 1989 480km of Donington	1989 season	Next race: 1989 480km of Mexico
