= 1989 480 km of Mexico =

Motor racing event

Layout of the Autódromo Hermanos Rodríguez (1986–2014)

The 1989 Trofeo Hermanos Rodríguez was the eighth and final round of the 1989 World Sportscar Championship season. It took place at the Autódromo Hermanos Rodríguez, Mexico on October 29, 1989.

During qualifying, Patrick Tambay's Jaguar came in contact with Antoine Salamin's Porsche on the front stretch, causing the Porsche to make heavy contact with the pit wall. Tambay was fined US$15,000 for the incident. Along with Salamin, several other teams were unable to race due to damage incurred during practice and qualifying.

Sauber Mercedes teammates Mauro Baldi and Jean-Louis Schlesser were both in contention going into this final round, Baldi leading by seven points. However, spin at Turn 14 by Kenny Acheson eliminated co-driver Baldi from contention, allowing Schlesser to take the World Drivers Championship.

== Official results ==
Class winners in bold. Cars failing to complete 75% of winner's distance marked as Not Classified (NC).

| Pos | Class | No | Team | Drivers | Chassis | Tyre | Laps |
| Pos | Class | No | Team | Drivers | Engine | Tyre | Laps |
|---|---|---|---|---|---|---|---|
| 1 | **C1** | **62** | **(West Germany) Team Sauber Mercedes** | **(France) Jean-Louis Schlesser (West Germany) Jochen Mass** | **Sauber C9** | MI | **109** |
| 1 | **C1** | **62** | **(West Germany) Team Sauber Mercedes** | **(France) Jean-Louis Schlesser (West Germany) Jochen Mass** | **Mercedes-Benz M119 5.0L V8** | MI | **109** |
| 2 | C1 | 5 | (Switzerland) Repsol Brun Motorsport | (Norway) Harald Huysman (Argentina) Oscar Larrauri | Porsche 962C | Y | 109 |
| 2 | C1 | 5 | (Switzerland) Repsol Brun Motorsport | (Norway) Harald Huysman (Argentina) Oscar Larrauri | Porsche Type-935 3.0L Turbo Flat-6 | Y | 109 |
| 3 | C1 | 8 | (West Germany) Joest Racing | (France) Henri Pescarolo (West Germany) Frank Jelinski | Porsche 962C | G | 109 |
| 3 | C1 | 8 | (West Germany) Joest Racing | (France) Henri Pescarolo (West Germany) Frank Jelinski | Porsche Type-935 3.0L Turbo Flat-6 | G | 109 |
| 4 | C1 | 14 | (United Kingdom) Richard Lloyd Racing | (United Kingdom) Tiff Needell (United Kingdom) Derek Bell | Porsche 962C GTi | G | 108 |
| 4 | C1 | 14 | (United Kingdom) Richard Lloyd Racing | (United Kingdom) Tiff Needell (United Kingdom) Derek Bell | Porsche Type-935 3.0L Turbo Flat-6 | G | 108 |
| 5 | C1 | 2 | (United Kingdom) Silk Cut Jaguar | (France) Alain Ferté (United Kingdom) Andy Wallace | Jaguar XJR-9 | D | 108 |
| 5 | C1 | 2 | (United Kingdom) Silk Cut Jaguar | (France) Alain Ferté (United Kingdom) Andy Wallace | Jaguar 7.0L V12 | D | 108 |
| 6 | C1 | 1 | (United Kingdom) Silk Cut Jaguar | (Netherlands) Jan Lammers (France) Patrick Tambay | Jaguar XJR-9 | D | 108 |
| 6 | C1 | 1 | (United Kingdom) Silk Cut Jaguar | (Netherlands) Jan Lammers (France) Patrick Tambay | Jaguar 7.0L V12 | D | 108 |
| 7 | C1 | 6 | (Switzerland) Repsol Brun Motorsport | (Switzerland) Walter Brun (Spain) Jesús Pareja | Porsche 962C | Y | 107 |
| 7 | C1 | 6 | (Switzerland) Repsol Brun Motorsport | (Switzerland) Walter Brun (Spain) Jesús Pareja | Porsche Type-935 3.0L Turbo Flat-6 | Y | 107 |
| 8 | C1 | 18 | (United Kingdom) Aston Martin (United Kingdom) Ecurie Ecosse | (United Kingdom) David Leslie (United Kingdom) Brian Redman | Aston Martin AMR1 | G | 107 |
| 8 | C1 | 18 | (United Kingdom) Aston Martin (United Kingdom) Ecurie Ecosse | (United Kingdom) David Leslie (United Kingdom) Brian Redman | Aston Martin RDP87 6.3L V8 | G | 107 |
| 9 | C1 | 10 | (West Germany) Porsche Kremer Racing | (West Germany) Manuel Reuter (Austria) Franz Konrad | Porsche 962CK6 | Y | 106 |
| 9 | C1 | 10 | (West Germany) Porsche Kremer Racing | (West Germany) Manuel Reuter (Austria) Franz Konrad | Porsche Type-935 3.0L Turbo Flat-6 | Y | 106 |
| 10 | C1 | 22 | (United Kingdom) Spice Engineering | (Chile) Eliseo Salazar (Denmark) Thorkild Thyrring | Spice SE89C | G | 106 |
| 10 | C1 | 22 | (United Kingdom) Spice Engineering | (Chile) Eliseo Salazar (Denmark) Thorkild Thyrring | Ford Cosworth DFZ 3.5L V8 | G | 106 |
| 11 | C1 | 20 | (United Kingdom) Team Davey | (United Kingdom) Tim Lee-Davey (Mexico) Alfonso Toledano | Porsche 962C | D | 106 |
| 11 | C1 | 20 | (United Kingdom) Team Davey | (United Kingdom) Tim Lee-Davey (Mexico) Alfonso Toledano | Porsche Type-935 3.0L Turbo Flat-6 | D | 106 |
| 12 | C1 | 23 | (Japan) Nissan Motorsports International | (United Kingdom) Mark Blundell (United Kingdom) Julian Bailey | Nissan R89C | D | 106 |
| 12 | C1 | 23 | (Japan) Nissan Motorsports International | (United Kingdom) Mark Blundell (United Kingdom) Julian Bailey | Nissan VRH35Z 3.5L Turbo V8 | D | 106 |
| 13 | **GTP** | **201** | **(Japan) Mazdaspeed** | **(Belgium) Pierre Dieudonné (Republic of Ireland) David Kennedy** | **Mazda 767B** | D | **105** |
| 13 | **GTP** | **201** | **(Japan) Mazdaspeed** | **(Belgium) Pierre Dieudonné (Republic of Ireland) David Kennedy** | **Mazda 13J 2.6L 4-Rotor** | D | **105** |
| 14 | C1 | 101 | (United Kingdom) Chamberlain Engineering | (Spain) Fermín Velez (United Kingdom) Nick Adams | Spice SE89C | G | 105 |
| 14 | C1 | 101 | (United Kingdom) Chamberlain Engineering | (Spain) Fermín Velez (United Kingdom) Nick Adams | Ford Cosworth DFZ 3.5L V8 | G | 105 |
| 15 | C1 | 34 | (France) Porsche Alméras Montpellier | (France) Jacques Alméras (France) Jean-Marie Alméras | Porsche 962C | G | 103 |
| 15 | C1 | 34 | (France) Porsche Alméras Montpellier | (France) Jacques Alméras (France) Jean-Marie Alméras | Porsche Type-935 3.0L Turbo Flat-6 | G | 103 |
| 16 | **C2** | **171** | **(United Kingdom) Team Mako** | **(Mexico) Andrés Conteras (Mexico) Giovanni Aloi** | **Spice SE88C** | G | **103** |
| 16 | **C2** | **171** | **(United Kingdom) Team Mako** | **(Mexico) Andrés Conteras (Mexico) Giovanni Aloi** | **Ford Cosworth DFL 3.3L V8** | G | **103** |
| 17 | C2 | 151 | (Switzerland) Pierre-Alain Lombardi (United States) Team Essex | (Mexico) Carlos Guerrero (Mexico) Aurelio López | Spice SE88P | G | 33 |
| 17 | C2 | 151 | (Switzerland) Pierre-Alain Lombardi (United States) Team Essex | (Mexico) Carlos Guerrero (Mexico) Aurelio López | Buick 3.0L V6 | G | 33 |
| 18 | C2 | 106 | (Italy) Porto Kaleo Team | (Italy) Ranieri Randaccio (Italy) Pasquale Barberio | Tiga GC288/9 | G | 103 |
| 18 | C2 | 106 | (Italy) Porto Kaleo Team | (Italy) Ranieri Randaccio (Italy) Pasquale Barberio | Ford Cosworth 3.3L V8 | G | 103 |
| 19 | C2 | 111 | (United Kingdom) PC Automotive (United Kingdom) ADA Engineering | (United Kingdom) Richard Piper (United States) Olindo Iacobelli | Spice SE88C | G | 102 |
| 19 | C2 | 111 | (United Kingdom) PC Automotive (United Kingdom) ADA Engineering | (United Kingdom) Richard Piper (United States) Olindo Iacobelli | Ford Cosworth DFL 3.3L V8 | G | 102 |
| 20 | C2 | 103 | France Prototeam | (France) Jean Messaoudi (Switzerland) Bernard Thuner | Spice SE88C | G | 102 |
| 20 | C2 | 103 | France Prototeam | (France) Jean Messaoudi (Switzerland) Bernard Thuner | Ford Cosworth DFZ 3.5L V8 | G | 102 |
| 21 | C2 | 108 | (United Kingdom) Roy Baker Racing (United Kingdom) GP Motorsport | (France) Philippe de Henning (United Kingdom) Chris Hodgetts | Spice SE87C | G | 100 |
| 21 | C2 | 108 | (United Kingdom) Roy Baker Racing (United Kingdom) GP Motorsport | (France) Philippe de Henning (United Kingdom) Chris Hodgetts | Ford Cosworth DFL 3.3L V8 | G | 100 |
| 22 | C2 | 107 | (United Kingdom) Tiga Racing Team | (Finland) Jari Nurminen (Mexico) Oscar Hidalgo | Tiga GC289 | G | 100 |
| 22 | C2 | 107 | (United Kingdom) Tiga Racing Team | (Finland) Jari Nurminen (Mexico) Oscar Hidalgo | Ford Cosworth DFL 3.3L V8 | G | 100 |
| 23 | C2 | 102 | (United Kingdom) Chamberlain Engineering | (Mexico) Tomás López (Belgium) Quirin Bovy | Spice SE86C | G | 96 |
| 23 | C2 | 102 | (United Kingdom) Chamberlain Engineering | (Mexico) Tomás López (Belgium) Quirin Bovy | Hart 418T 1.8L Turbo I4 | G | 96 |
| 24 DNF | C1 | 37 | (Japan) Toyota Team Tom's | (United Kingdom) Johnny Dumfries (United Kingdom) John Watson | Toyota 89C-V | B | 66 |
| 24 DNF | C1 | 37 | (Japan) Toyota Team Tom's | (United Kingdom) Johnny Dumfries (United Kingdom) John Watson | Toyota R32V 3.2L Turbo V8 | B | 66 |
| 25 DNF | C1 | 13 | (France) Courage Compétition | (France) Pascal Fabre (Mexico) Oscar Manautou | Cougar C22S | G | 64 |
| 25 DNF | C1 | 13 | (France) Courage Compétition | (France) Pascal Fabre (Mexico) Oscar Manautou | Porsche Type-935 3.0L Turbo Flat-6 | G | 64 |
| 26 DNF | C2 | 178 | (France) Didier Bonnet | (France) Patrick Oudet (France) Gérard Cuynet | Tiga GC289 | G | 61 |
| 26 DNF | C2 | 178 | (France) Didier Bonnet | (France) Patrick Oudet (France) Gérard Cuynet | Ford Cosworth DFL 3.3L V8 | G | 61 |
| 27 DNF | C1 | 61 | (West Germany) Team Sauber Mercedes | (United Kingdom) Kenny Acheson (Italy) Mauro Baldi | Sauber C9 | MI | 46 |
| 27 DNF | C1 | 61 | (West Germany) Team Sauber Mercedes | (United Kingdom) Kenny Acheson (Italy) Mauro Baldi | Mercedes-Benz M119 5.0L Turbo V8 | MI | 46 |
| 28 DNF | C1 | 21 | (United Kingdom) Spice Engineering | (Mexico) Bernard Jourdain (United Kingdom) Ray Bellm | Spice SE89C | G | 39 |
| 28 DNF | C1 | 21 | (United Kingdom) Spice Engineering | (Mexico) Bernard Jourdain (United Kingdom) Ray Bellm | Ford Cosworth DFZ 3.5L V8 | G | 39 |
| 29 DNF | C1 | 29 | (Italy) Mussato Action Car | (Italy) Bruno Giacomelli (Mexico) Enrique Contreras | Lancia LC2 | D | 9 |
| 29 DNF | C1 | 29 | (Italy) Mussato Action Car | (Italy) Bruno Giacomelli (Mexico) Enrique Contreras | Ferrari 308C 3.0L Turbo V8 | D | 9 |
| 30 DNF | C1 | 72 | (West Germany) Obermaier Primagaz | (West Germany) Jürgen Lässig (France) Pierre Yver | Porsche 962C | G | 5 |
| 30 DNF | C1 | 72 | (West Germany) Obermaier Primagaz | (West Germany) Jürgen Lässig (France) Pierre Yver | Porsche Type-935 3.0L Turbo Flat-6 | G | 5 |
| 31 DNF | C1 | 7 | (West Germany) Joest Racing | (West Germany) Frank Jelinski (France) Bob Wollek | Porsche 962C | G | 3 |
| 31 DNF | C1 | 7 | (West Germany) Joest Racing | (West Germany) Frank Jelinski (France) Bob Wollek | Porsche Type-935 3.0L Turbo Flat-6 | G | 3 |
| DNS | C1 | 16 | (Switzerland) Repsol Brun Motorsport | (Italy) Massimo Sigala (Austria) Roland Ratzenberger | Porsche 962C | Y | - |
| DNS | C1 | 16 | (Switzerland) Repsol Brun Motorsport | (Italy) Massimo Sigala (Austria) Roland Ratzenberger | Porsche Type-935 3.0L Turbo Flat-6 | Y | - |
| DNS | C1 | 17 | (West Germany) Dauer Racing | (West Germany) Jochen Dauer (Mexico) Juan Carlos Bolaños | Porsche 962C | G | - |
| DNS | C1 | 17 | (West Germany) Dauer Racing | (West Germany) Jochen Dauer (Mexico) Juan Carlos Bolaños | Porsche Type-935 3.0L Turbo Flat-6 | G | - |
| DNS | C1 | 40 | (Switzerland) Swiss Team Salamin | (Switzerland) Antoine Salamin (Italy) Giovanni Lavaggi | Porsche 962C | G | - |
| DNS | C1 | 40 | (Switzerland) Swiss Team Salamin | (Switzerland) Antoine Salamin (Italy) Giovanni Lavaggi | Porsche Type-935 3.0L Turbo Flat-6 | G | - |
| DNS | C2 | 177 | (France) Automobiles Louis Descartes | (France) Marc Fontan (France) Alain Serpaggi | ALD C289 | G | - |
| DNS | C2 | 177 | (France) Automobiles Louis Descartes | (France) Marc Fontan (France) Alain Serpaggi | Ford Cosworth 3.3L V8 | G | - |

== Statistics ==
- Pole position - #61 Team Sauber Mercedes - 1:22.571
- Fastest lap - #62 Team Sauber Mercedes - 1:25.120
- Average speed - 168.788 km/h

World Sportscar Championship
| Previous race: 1989 480 km of Spa | 1989 season | Next race: None |
