= 1990 480 km of Montreal =

Motorsport race

Layout of the Circuit Gilles Villeneuve (1988-1993)

The 1990 480 km of Montreal (promoted as the Player's Ltée Mondial Montréal) was the eighth round of the 1990 World Sportscar Championship season, taking place at Circuit Gilles Villeneuve, Canada. It took place on September 23, 1990.

The race was ended just after half distance due to a heavy accident. Jésus Pareja's Brun 962C collided with a manhole cover which had been pulled free by the ground effects of the car ahead of it, leading to a large fire. Concern over the manhole covers led to the organizers stopping the race a few laps later, with half points being awarded due to failing to complete 75% of the race distance.

This race also saw the competition debut of Peugeot, with their new 905.

== Official results ==
| Pos | Class | No | Team | Drivers | Chassis | Tyre | Laps |
| Pos | Class | No | Team | Drivers | Engine | Tyre | Laps |
|---|---|---|---|---|---|---|---|
| 1 | C | 1 | (Germany) Team Sauber Mercedes | (France) Jean-Louis Schlesser (Italy) Mauro Baldi | Mercedes-Benz C11 | G | 61 |
| 1 | C | 1 | (Germany) Team Sauber Mercedes | (France) Jean-Louis Schlesser (Italy) Mauro Baldi | Mercedes-Benz M119 5.0L Turbo V8 | G | 61 |
| 2 | C | 23 | (Japan) Nissan Motorsports International | (United Kingdom) Mark Blundell (United Kingdom) Julian Bailey | Nissan R90CK | D | 61 |
| 2 | C | 23 | (Japan) Nissan Motorsports International | (United Kingdom) Mark Blundell (United Kingdom) Julian Bailey | Nissan VHR35Z 3.5L Turbo V8 | D | 61 |
| 3 | C | 14 | (United Kingdom) Richard Lloyd Racing | (Germany) Manuel Reuter | Porsche 962C GTi | G | 61 |
| 3 | C | 14 | (United Kingdom) Richard Lloyd Racing | (Germany) Manuel Reuter | Porsche Type-935 3.0L Turbo Flat-6 | G | 61 |
| 4 | C | 10 | (Germany) Porsche Kremer Racing | (Germany) Bernd Schneider | Porsche 962CK6 | Y | 61 |
| 4 | C | 10 | (Germany) Porsche Kremer Racing | (Germany) Bernd Schneider | Porsche Type-935 3.0L Turbo Flat-6 | Y | 61 |
| 5 | C | 24 | (Japan) Nissan Motorsports International | (United Kingdom) Kenny Acheson | Nissan R90CK | D | 61 |
| 5 | C | 24 | (Japan) Nissan Motorsports International | (United Kingdom) Kenny Acheson | Nissan VHR35Z 3.5L Turbo V8 | D | 61 |
| 6 | C | 7 | (Germany) Joest Porsche Racing | (France) Bob Wollek (Germany) Frank Jelinski | Porsche 962C | MI | 61 |
| 6 | C | 7 | (Germany) Joest Porsche Racing | (France) Bob Wollek (Germany) Frank Jelinski | Porsche Type-935 3.2L Turbo Flat-6 | MI | 61 |
| 7 | C | 37 | (Japan) Toyota Team Tom's | (United Kingdom) Geoff Lees (United Kingdom) John Watson | Toyota 89C-V | B | 60 |
| 7 | C | 37 | (Japan) Toyota Team Tom's | (United Kingdom) Geoff Lees (United Kingdom) John Watson | Toyota R36V 3.6L Turbo V8 | B | 60 |
| 8 | C | 8 | (Germany) Joest Porsche Racing | (United Kingdom) Jonathan Palmer (Germany) Hans-Joachim Stuck | Porsche 962C | MI | 60 |
| 8 | C | 8 | (Germany) Joest Porsche Racing | (United Kingdom) Jonathan Palmer (Germany) Hans-Joachim Stuck | Porsche Type-935 3.2L Turbo Flat-6 | MI | 60 |
| 9 | C | 2 | (Germany) Team Sauber Mercedes | (Germany) Jochen Mass (Austria) Karl Wendlinger | Mercedes-Benz C11 | G | 60 |
| 9 | C | 2 | (Germany) Team Sauber Mercedes | (Germany) Jochen Mass (Austria) Karl Wendlinger | Mercedes-Benz M119 5.0L Turbo V8 | G | 60 |
| 10 DNF | C | 15 | (Switzerland) Brun Motorsport | (Argentina) Oscar Larrauri (Norway) Harald Huysman | Porsche 962C | Y | 59 |
| 10 DNF | C | 15 | (Switzerland) Brun Motorsport | (Argentina) Oscar Larrauri (Norway) Harald Huysman | Porsche Type-935 3.0L Turbo Flat-6 | Y | 59 |
| 11 | C | 26 | (Germany) Obermaier Racing | (Germany) Harald Grohs | Porsche 962C | G | 59 |
| 11 | C | 26 | (Germany) Obermaier Racing | (Germany) Harald Grohs | Porsche Type-935 3.0L Turbo Flat-6 | G | 59 |
| 12 | C | 29 | (United Kingdom) Chamberlain Engineering | (United Kingdom) Richard Piper | Spice SE89C | G | 59 |
| 12 | C | 29 | (United Kingdom) Chamberlain Engineering | (United Kingdom) Richard Piper | Ford Cosworth DFZ 3.5L V8 | G | 59 |
| 13 | C | 9 | (Germany) Joest Racing | (France) Henri Pescarolo (Germany) "John Winter" | Porsche 962C | G | 59 |
| 13 | C | 9 | (Germany) Joest Racing | (France) Henri Pescarolo (Germany) "John Winter" | Porsche Type-935 3.0L Turbo Flat-6 | G | 59 |
| 14 | C | 36 | (Japan) Toyota Team Tom's | (United Kingdom) Johnny Dumfries (Italy) Roberto Ravaglia | Toyota 90C-V | B | 58 |
| 14 | C | 36 | (Japan) Toyota Team Tom's | (United Kingdom) Johnny Dumfries (Italy) Roberto Ravaglia | Toyota R36V 3.6L Turbo V8 | B | 58 |
| 15 DNF | C | 3 | (United Kingdom) Silk Cut Jaguar | (United Kingdom) Martin Brundle (Netherlands) Jan Lammers | Jaguar XJR-11 | G | 58 |
| 15 DNF | C | 3 | (United Kingdom) Silk Cut Jaguar | (United Kingdom) Martin Brundle (Netherlands) Jan Lammers | Jaguar JV6 3.5L Turbo V6 | G | 58 |
| 16 DNF | C | 17 | (Switzerland) Brun Motorsport | (Switzerland) Bernard Santal (Spain) Jesús Pareja | Porsche 962C | Y | 58 |
| 16 DNF | C | 17 | (Switzerland) Brun Motorsport | (Switzerland) Bernard Santal (Spain) Jesús Pareja | Porsche Type-935 3.0L Turbo Flat-6 | Y | 58 |
| 17 | C | 27 | (Germany) Obermaier Racing | (Germany) Otto Altenbach (Germany) Jürgen Lässig | Porsche 962C | G | 58 |
| 17 | C | 27 | (Germany) Obermaier Racing | (Germany) Otto Altenbach (Germany) Jürgen Lässig | Porsche Type-935 3.0L Turbo Flat-6 | G | 58 |
| 18 | C | 34 | (France) Equipe Alméras Fréres | (France) Jacques Alméras (France) Jean-Marie Alméras | Porsche 962C | G | 57 |
| 18 | C | 34 | (France) Equipe Alméras Fréres | (France) Jacques Alméras (France) Jean-Marie Alméras | Porsche Type-935 3.0L Turbo Flat-6 | G | 57 |
| 19 DNF | C | 12 | (France) Courage Compétition | (France) Denis Morin (Switzerland) Bernard Thuner | Cougar C24S | G | 56 |
| 19 DNF | C | 12 | (France) Courage Compétition | (France) Denis Morin (Switzerland) Bernard Thuner | Porsche Type-935 3.0L Turbo Flat-6 | G | 56 |
| 20 | C | 39 | (Switzerland) Swiss Team Salamin | (Switzerland) Antoine Salamin (Morocco) Max Cohen-Olivar | Porsche 962C | G | 56 |
| 20 | C | 39 | (Switzerland) Swiss Team Salamin | (Switzerland) Antoine Salamin (Morocco) Max Cohen-Olivar | Porsche Type-935 3.0L Turbo Flat-6 | G | 56 |
| 21 | C | 22 | (United Kingdom) Spice Engineering | (South Africa) Wayne Taylor (Spain) Fermín Vélez | Spice SE90C | G | 55 |
| 21 | C | 22 | (United Kingdom) Spice Engineering | (South Africa) Wayne Taylor (Spain) Fermín Vélez | Ford Cosworth DFR 3.5L V8 | G | 55 |
| 22 | C | 32 | (Austria) Konrad Motorsport | (Austria) Franz Konrad (Finland) Harri Toivonen | Porsche 962C | G | 52 |
| 22 | C | 32 | (Austria) Konrad Motorsport | (Austria) Franz Konrad (Finland) Harri Toivonen | Porsche Type-935 3.0L Turbo Flat-6 | G | 52 |
| 23 DNF | C | 13 | (France) Courage Compétition | (France) Pascal Fabre (France) Michel Trollé | Cougar C24S | G | 46 |
| 23 DNF | C | 13 | (France) Courage Compétition | (France) Pascal Fabre (France) Michel Trollé | Porsche Type-935 3.0L Turbo Flat-6 | G | 46 |
| 24 DNF | C | 4 | (United Kingdom) Silk Cut Jaguar | (United Kingdom) Andy Wallace (United States) Davy Jones | Jaguar XJR-11 | G | 37 |
| 24 DNF | C | 4 | (United Kingdom) Silk Cut Jaguar | (United Kingdom) Andy Wallace (United States) Davy Jones | Jaguar JV6 3.5L Turbo V6 | G | 37 |
| 25 DNF | C | 20 | (United Kingdom) Team Davey | (United Kingdom) Tim Lee-Davey | Porsche 962C | D | 30 |
| 25 DNF | C | 20 | (United Kingdom) Team Davey | (United Kingdom) Tim Lee-Davey | Porsche Type-935 3.0L Turbo Flat-6 | D | 30 |
| 26 DNF | C | 30 | (United Kingdom) GP Motorsport | (Italy) Beppe Gabbiani | Spice SE90C | D | 23 |
| 26 DNF | C | 30 | (United Kingdom) GP Motorsport | (Italy) Beppe Gabbiani | Ford Cosworth DFZ 3.5L V8 | D | 23 |
| 27 DNF | C | 16 | (Switzerland) Brun Motorsport | (Spain) Jesús Pareja (Switzerland) Walter Brun | Porsche 962C | Y | 22 |
| 27 DNF | C | 16 | (Switzerland) Brun Motorsport | (Spain) Jesús Pareja (Switzerland) Walter Brun | Porsche Type-935 3.0L Turbo Flat-6 | Y | 22 |
| 28 DNF | C | 44 | (France) Peugeot Talbot Sport | (Finland) Keke Rosberg (France) Jean-Pierre Jabouille | Peugeot 905 | MI | 22 |
| 28 DNF | C | 44 | (France) Peugeot Talbot Sport | (Finland) Keke Rosberg (France) Jean-Pierre Jabouille | Peugeot SA35 3.5L V10 | MI | 22 |
| 29 DNF | C | 41 | (Italy) Alba Formula | (Italy) Giorgio Francia | Alba AR20 | G | 8 |
| 29 DNF | C | 41 | (Italy) Alba Formula | (Italy) Giorgio Francia | Buick 4.5L V6 | G | 8 |
| 30 DNF | C | 35 | (France) Automobiles Louis Descartes | (France) François Migault (Italy) Luigi Taverna | ALD C289 | D | 3 |
| 30 DNF | C | 35 | (France) Automobiles Louis Descartes | (France) François Migault (Italy) Luigi Taverna | Ford Cosworth DFL 3.3L V8 | D | 3 |
| DNS | C | 21 | (United Kingdom) Spice Engineering | (South Africa) Wayne Taylor (Spain) Fermín Vélez | Spice SE90C | G | - |
| DNS | C | 21 | (United Kingdom) Spice Engineering | (South Africa) Wayne Taylor (Spain) Fermín Vélez | Ford Cosworth DFR 3.5L V8 | G | - |
| DNS | C | 28 | (United Kingdom) Chamberlain Engineering | (United Kingdom) Nick Adams (Netherlands) Charles Zwolsman | Spice SE89C | G | - |
| DNS | C | 28 | (United Kingdom) Chamberlain Engineering | (United Kingdom) Nick Adams (Netherlands) Charles Zwolsman | Ford Cosworth DFZ 3.5L V8 | G | - |
| DNQ | C | 40 | (United Kingdom) The Berkeley Team London | (Italy) Ranieri Randaccio (Italy) Pasquale Barberio | Spice SE89C | G | - |
| DNQ | C | 40 | (United Kingdom) The Berkeley Team London | (Italy) Ranieri Randaccio (Italy) Pasquale Barberio | Ford Cosworth DFZ 3.5L V8 | G | - |

== Statistics ==
- Pole Position - #1 Jean-Louis Schlesser - 1:25.407
- Fastest Lap - #1 Mauro Baldi - 1:28.725
- Distance - 267.79 km
- Average Speed - 153.461 km/h

World Sportscar Championship
| Previous race: 1990 480 km of Donington | 1990 season | Next race: 1990 480 km of Mexico City |
