= 1990 480 km of Donington =

Motor race in World Sportscar Championship

Layout of the Donington Park

The 1990 480 km of Donington was the seventh round of the 1990 World Sportscar Championship season, taking place at Donington Park, United Kingdom. It took place on September 2, 1990.

== Official results ==
Class winners in bold. Cars failing to complete 75% of the winner's distance marked as Not Classified (NC).

Pos	Class	No	Team	Drivers	Chassis	Tyre	Laps
Pos	Class	No	Team	Drivers	Engine	Tyre	Laps
1	**C**	**1**	**(Germany) Team Sauber Mercedes**	**(France) Jean-Louis Schlesser (Italy) Mauro Baldi**	**Mercedes-Benz C11**	G	**120**
1	**C**	**1**	**(Germany) Team Sauber Mercedes**	**(France) Jean-Louis Schlesser (Italy) Mauro Baldi**	**Mercedes-Benz M119 5.0L Turbo V8**	G	**120**
2	C	2	(Germany) Team Sauber Mercedes	(Germany) Jochen Mass (Germany) Heinz-Harald Frentzen	Mercedes-Benz C11	G	120
2	C	2	(Germany) Team Sauber Mercedes	(Germany) Jochen Mass (Germany) Heinz-Harald Frentzen	Mercedes-Benz M119 5.0L Turbo V8	G	120
3	C	22	(United Kingdom) Spice Engineering	(United Kingdom) Tim Harvey (Netherlands) Cor Euser	Spice SE90C	G	118
3	C	22	(United Kingdom) Spice Engineering	(United Kingdom) Tim Harvey (Netherlands) Cor Euser	Ford Cosworth DFR 3.5L V8	G	118
4	C	24	(Japan) Nissan Motorsports International	(United Kingdom) Kenny Acheson (Italy) Gianfranco Brancatelli	Nissan R90CK	D	117
4	C	24	(Japan) Nissan Motorsports International	(United Kingdom) Kenny Acheson (Italy) Gianfranco Brancatelli	Nissan VHR35Z 3.5L Turbo V8	D	117
5	C	21	(United Kingdom) Spice Engineering	(Belgium) Eric van de Poele (Italy) Bruno Giacomelli	Spice SE90C	G	117
5	C	21	(United Kingdom) Spice Engineering	(Belgium) Eric van de Poele (Italy) Bruno Giacomelli	Ford Cosworth DFR 3.5L V8	G	117
6	C	23	(Japan) Nissan Motorsports International	(United Kingdom) Julian Bailey (United Kingdom) Mark Blundell	Nissan R90CK	D	117
6	C	23	(Japan) Nissan Motorsports International	(United Kingdom) Julian Bailey (United Kingdom) Mark Blundell	Nissan VHR35Z 3.5L Turbo V8	D	117
7	C	7	(Germany) Joest Porsche Racing	(France) Bob Wollek (Germany) Frank Jelinski	Porsche 962C	MI	116
7	C	7	(Germany) Joest Porsche Racing	(France) Bob Wollek (Germany) Frank Jelinski	Porsche Type-935 3.2L Turbo Flat-6	MI	116
8	C	11	(Germany) Porsche Kremer Racing (United Kingdom) Convector	(Sweden) Anders Olofsson (United Kingdom) Anthony Reid	Porsche 962C	D	116
8	C	11	(Germany) Porsche Kremer Racing (United Kingdom) Convector	(Sweden) Anders Olofsson (United Kingdom) Anthony Reid	Porsche Type-935 3.0L Turbo Flat-6	D	116
9	C	10	(Germany) Porsche Kremer Racing	(Germany) Bernd Schneider (South Africa) Sarel van der Merwe	Porsche 962CK6	Y	115
9	C	10	(Germany) Porsche Kremer Racing	(Germany) Bernd Schneider (South Africa) Sarel van der Merwe	Porsche Type-935 3.0L Turbo Flat-6	Y	115
10	C	8	(Germany) Joest Porsche Racing	(United Kingdom) Jonathan Palmer (Germany) Michael Bartels	Porsche 962C	MI	115
10	C	8	(Germany) Joest Porsche Racing	(United Kingdom) Jonathan Palmer (Germany) Michael Bartels	Porsche Type-935 3.2L Turbo Flat-6	MI	115
11	C	14	(United Kingdom) Richard Lloyd Racing	(Germany) Manuel Reuter (Sweden) Steven Andskär	Porsche 962C GTi	G	114
11	C	14	(United Kingdom) Richard Lloyd Racing	(Germany) Manuel Reuter (Sweden) Steven Andskär	Porsche Type-935 3.0L Turbo Flat-6	G	114
12	C	16	(Switzerland) Brun Motorsport	(Spain) Jesús Pareja (Switzerland) Walter Brun	Porsche 962C	Y	113
12	C	16	(Switzerland) Brun Motorsport	(Spain) Jesús Pareja (Switzerland) Walter Brun	Porsche Type-935 3.0L Turbo Flat-6	Y	113
13	C	26	(Germany) Obermaier Racing	(Germany) Harald Grohs (Germany) Otto Altenbach	Porsche 962C	G	113
13	C	26	(Germany) Obermaier Racing	(Germany) Harald Grohs (Germany) Otto Altenbach	Porsche Type-935 3.0L Turbo Flat-6	G	113
14	C	9	(Germany) Joest Racing	(France) Henri Pescarolo (Germany) "John Winter"	Porsche 962C	G	113
14	C	9	(Germany) Joest Racing	(France) Henri Pescarolo (Germany) "John Winter"	Porsche Type-935 3.0L Turbo Flat-6	G	113
15	C	17	(Switzerland) Brun Motorsport	(Switzerland) Bernard Santal	Porsche 962C	Y	113
15	C	17	(Switzerland) Brun Motorsport	(Switzerland) Bernard Santal	Porsche Type-935 3.0L Turbo Flat-6	Y	113
16	C	32	(Austria) Konrad Motorsport	(Austria) Franz Konrad (Finland) Harri Toivonen	Porsche 962C	G	112
16	C	32	(Austria) Konrad Motorsport	(Austria) Franz Konrad (Finland) Harri Toivonen	Porsche Type-935 3.0L Turbo Flat-6	G	112
17	C	20	(United Kingdom) Team Davey	(Italy) Giovanni Lavaggi (United Kingdom) Val Musetti	Porsche 962C	D	111
17	C	20	(United Kingdom) Team Davey	(Italy) Giovanni Lavaggi (United Kingdom) Val Musetti	Porsche Type-935 3.0L Turbo Flat-6	D	111
18	C	29	(United Kingdom) Chamberlain Engineering	(Canada) Robbie Stirling (Switzerland) Bernard Thuner	Spice SE89C	G	108
18	C	29	(United Kingdom) Chamberlain Engineering	(Canada) Robbie Stirling (Switzerland) Bernard Thuner	Ford Cosworth DFZ 3.5L V8	G	108
19	C	39	(Switzerland) Swiss Team Salamin	(Switzerland) Antoine Salamin (Morocco) Max Cohen-Olivar	Porsche 962C	G	107
19	C	39	(Switzerland) Swiss Team Salamin	(Switzerland) Antoine Salamin (Morocco) Max Cohen-Olivar	Porsche Type-935 3.0L Turbo Flat-6	G	107
20	C	35	(France) Louis Descartes	(France) François Migault (France) François Wettling	ALD C289	D	97
20	C	35	(France) Louis Descartes	(France) François Migault (France) François Wettling	Ford Cosworth DFL 3.3L V8	D	97
21 DSQ^{†}	C	3	(United Kingdom) Silk Cut Jaguar	(United Kingdom) Martin Brundle	Jaguar XJR-11	G	119
21 DSQ^{†}	C	3	(United Kingdom) Silk Cut Jaguar	(United Kingdom) Martin Brundle	Jaguar JV6 3.5L Turbo V6	G	119
22 DSQ^{†}	C	4	(United Kingdom) Silk Cut Jaguar	(United Kingdom) Andy Wallace (Netherlands) Jan Lammers	Jaguar XJR-11	G	117
22 DSQ^{†}	C	4	(United Kingdom) Silk Cut Jaguar	(United Kingdom) Andy Wallace (Netherlands) Jan Lammers	Jaguar JV6 3.5L Turbo V6	G	117
23 DNF	C	15	(Switzerland) Brun Motorsport	(Argentina) Oscar Larrauri (Norway) Harald Huysman	Porsche 962C	Y	116
23 DNF	C	15	(Switzerland) Brun Motorsport	(Argentina) Oscar Larrauri (Norway) Harald Huysman	Porsche Type-935 3.0L Turbo Flat-6	Y	116
24 DNF	C	37	(Japan) Toyota Team Tom's	(United Kingdom) Geoff Lees (United Kingdom) John Watson	Toyota 89C-V	B	112
24 DNF	C	37	(Japan) Toyota Team Tom's	(United Kingdom) Geoff Lees (United Kingdom) John Watson	Toyota R36V 3.6L Turbo V8	B	112
25 DNF	C	36	(Japan) Toyota Team Tom's	(United Kingdom) Johnny Dumfries (Italy) Roberto Ravaglia	Toyota 90C-V	B	99
25 DNF	C	36	(Japan) Toyota Team Tom's	(United Kingdom) Johnny Dumfries (Italy) Roberto Ravaglia	Toyota R36V 3.6L Turbo V8	B	99
26 DNF	C	13	(France) Courage Compétition	(France) Pascal Fabre (France) Michel Trollé	Cougar C24S	G	54
26 DNF	C	13	(France) Courage Compétition	(France) Pascal Fabre (France) Michel Trollé	Porsche Type-935 3.0L Turbo Flat-6	G	54
27 DNF	C	40	(United Kingdom) The Berkeley Team London	(Italy) Ranieri Randaccio (Italy) "Stingbrace"	Spice SE89C	G	45
27 DNF	C	40	(United Kingdom) The Berkeley Team London	(Italy) Ranieri Randaccio (Italy) "Stingbrace"	Ford Cosworth DFZ 3.5L V8	G	45
28 DNF	C	30	(United Kingdom) GP Motorsport	(Italy) Beppe Gabbiani (Finland) Jari Nurminen	Spice SE90C	D	35
28 DNF	C	30	(United Kingdom) GP Motorsport	(Italy) Beppe Gabbiani (Finland) Jari Nurminen	Ford Cosworth DFZ 3.5L V8	D	35
29 DNF	C	31	(United Kingdom) GP Motorsport (United Kingdom) PC Automotive	(United Kingdom) Richard Piper (United Kingdom) Mike Youles	Spice SE89C	G	35
29 DNF	C	31	(United Kingdom) GP Motorsport (United Kingdom) PC Automotive	(United Kingdom) Richard Piper (United Kingdom) Mike Youles	Ford Cosworth DFZ 3.5L V8	G	35
30 DNF	C	28	(United Kingdom) Chamberlain Engineering	(United Kingdom) Will Hoy (United Kingdom) Nick Adams	Spice SE89C	G	7
30 DNF	C	28	(United Kingdom) Chamberlain Engineering	(United Kingdom) Will Hoy (United Kingdom) Nick Adams	Ford Cosworth DFZ 3.5L V8	G	7
31 DNF	C	27	(Germany) Obermaier Racing	(Germany) Harald Grohs (Germany) Otto Altenbach	Porsche 962C	G	1
31 DNF	C	27	(Germany) Obermaier Racing	(Germany) Harald Grohs (Germany) Otto Altenbach	Porsche Type-935 3.0L Turbo Flat-6	G	1
DNS	C	12	(France) Courage Compétition	(France) Michel Trollé	Cougar C24S	G	-
DNS	C	12	(France) Courage Compétition	(France) Michel Trollé	Porsche Type-935 3.0L Turbo Flat-6	G	-
DNQ	C	41	(Italy) Alba Formula Team	(Italy) Gianfranco Trombetti (Italy) Marco Brand	Alba AR20	G	-
DNQ	C	41	(Italy) Alba Formula Team	(Italy) Gianfranco Trombetti (Italy) Marco Brand	Buick 4.5L V6	G	-

† - #3 and #4 Silk Cut Jaguars both were disqualified for using more than their allowed amount of fuel.

== Statistics ==
- Pole Position - #1 Mauro Baldi - 1:16.952
- Fastest Lap - #1 Mauro Baldi - 1:23.597
- Average Speed - 166.64 km/h

World Sportscar Championship
Previous race: 1990 480 km of Nürburgring	1990 season	Next race: 1990 480 km of Montreal
