= Aston Martin AMR1 =

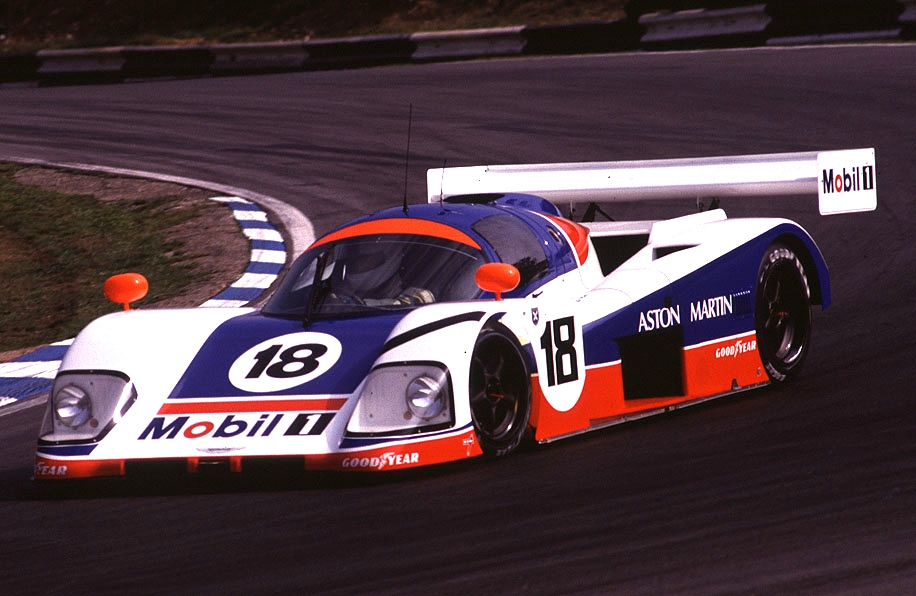
- Aston Martin AMR1 at 1989 1000 km Brands Hatch
- Category: Group C sports prototype
- Constructor: Aston Martin (Protech)
- Designers: Max Bostrom; Ray Mallock

Technical specifications
- Chassis: Carbon-kevlar monocoque
- Suspension (front): Independent, double wishboned with anti-roll bar
- Suspension (rear): Independent, double wishboned with anti-roll bar
- Length: 4,780 mm (188.2 in)
- Width: 1,990 mm (78.3 in)
- Height: 1,020 mm (40.2 in)
- Wheelbase: 2,900 mm (114.2 in)
- Engine: Aston Martin RDP87 5,998 cc/6,300 cc alloy V8, Zytec ECU naturally aspirated, mid-longitudinally mounted
- Transmission: 5-speed Manual
- Weight: 902 to 988 kg (1,988 to 2,178 lb)
- Tyres: Goodyear Eagle

Competition history
- Notable entrants: (United Kingdom) Aston Martin; ( (United Kingdom) Ecurie Ecosse)
- Notable drivers: (United Kingdom) Brian Redman; (United Kingdom) David Leslie; (United Kingdom) Ray Mallock; (United Kingdom) David Sears; (Republic of Ireland) Michael Roe; (Greece) Costas Los; (Sweden) Stanley Dickens
- Debut: 1989 480km of Dijon
Races	Wins	Poles	F/Laps
7	0	0	0
- Constructors' Championships: 0
- Drivers' Championships: 0

The Aston Martin AMR1 was a Group C formula racing car developed in 1989 for car manufacturer Aston Martin. It participated in the 1989 World Sports Prototype Championship and 1989 24 Hours of Le Mans.

== Design ==
Following Aston Martin's racing efforts as an engine supplier for Nimrod Racing and EMKA Racing in the early 1980s, it was decided that Aston Martin would develop their own car for the World Sports Prototype Championship. Thus in late 1987, a partnership between Peter Livanos, Victor Gauntlett, Richard Williams and Ray Mallock - through his shareholding in Scottish racing firm Ecurie Ecosse would be formed, creating a new company known as Proteus Technology Ltd. (Protech). The team would develop and run the AMR1 project, competing for the first time during the 1989 season.

Richard Williams was named as the organisation's managing director and team manager; Ray Mallock was engineering director; Max Boxstrom would be the lead designer and Reeves Callaway, of Callaway Cars Incorporated, would build the engine. The chassis and bodywork designed by Boxstrom would be built by British firm Courtaulds. For the engine, Callaway would use 5.3 L V8 units from the newly launched Virage, ending up with a 700 hp (522 kW) 6.0 L engine known as the RDP87. The engine was fitted with a 100 litre fuel cell with a 6.5 litre reserve for extra range. With this combination, a total of four AMR1 chassis would be finished in early 1989.

== Racing history ==
With AMR1/01 completed, testing began in preparation for the first race at Suzuka Circuit in Japan. AMR1/01 was involved in an accident during testing at Donington Park and was damaged beyond repair. Thus Aston Martin was forced to skip the first round, incurring a $250,000 fine by FIA's newly amended rule which required C1 cars to enter all rounds of the season and instead premiered chassis AMR1/01 at Dijon-Prenois, where it finished a disappointing 17th.

Although not part of the World Sports Prototype Championship in 1989, Aston Martin next turned to the 24 Hours of Le Mans. Two cars were entered, chassis #01 and #03. The cars were underpowered in comparison to their competitors, qualifying 32nd and 40th in a field of 56 cars. During the race itself, the cars were able to run in the mid-pack before AMR1/03 suffered electrical problems and was forced to retire during the first half of the race. AMR1/01 was able to continue on, was able to finish in 11th place overall.

Due to a lack of time between Le Mans and the 3rd round of the World Sports Prototype Championship, Aston Martin decided to skip it, returning instead at Brands Hatch where AMR1/04 took home an exciting 4th-place finish in front of the British crowd, then following it up with an 8th-place finish at the Nürburgring.

For the 6th round of the year, the World Sports Prototype Championship again returned to British soil. Aston Martin therefore decided to run two AMR1s at Donington Park, debuting newly built chassis #05. The two cars were able to finish 6th and 7th. Both cars raced again at Circuit de Spa-Francorchamps where Aston Martin suffered their only other failure to finish in the season, chassis #04 having suffered engine failure. However, chassis #05, which had now been upgraded with an even more powerful 720 hp, Version II 6.3 L V8, was able to finish a respectable 7th. For the final round in Mexico, Aston Martin decided to take only chassis #05, where they finished 8th.

Ending the season, Aston Martin had finished 6th in the Teams Championship, behind the factory Mercedes-Benz, Porsche, Jaguar, and Nissan teams, although they were able to defeat the Toyota team.

== Cancellation ==
=== AMR2 ===
At the time of the end of the 1989 season, Protech was already beginning development of the AMR2 for 1990. With the intention for this car to race alongside another two AMR1's in the 1990 24 Hours of Le Mans. The AMR2 combined the chassis of the AMR1, a newer and more powerful 6.3L Version III V8, and an evolved, more aerodynamic body design. The AMR2 was promised to be faster in a straight line than the AMR1 (with a predicted top speed of 230+ mph), a problem which had greatly hindered AMR1 at Le Mans.

However, with the announcement from the FIA that Group C engine regulations were to change to only allow 3.5 litre normally aspirated engines from 1991, There was not the budget available to develop a new engine and Protech was disbanded and closed in February 1990 before the chassis AMR2/06 could be completed. AMR2/06 was later built up from left over parts and fitted with an AMR1 body. Aesthetically AMR2/06 looks exactly the same as an AMR1 even with the same Mobil 1 livery.

=== AMR3 ===
Shortly before closure of Protech, plans for another racing car were put in place. For a 1991 Aston Martin AMR3, this time to be designed by Tony Southgate. But Aston Martin were forced to drop out of motor racing due to the economic instability of the company at the time. It would be the last racing car produced by Aston Martin for fifteen years until the launch of the DBR9 in 2005.

== Chassis ==
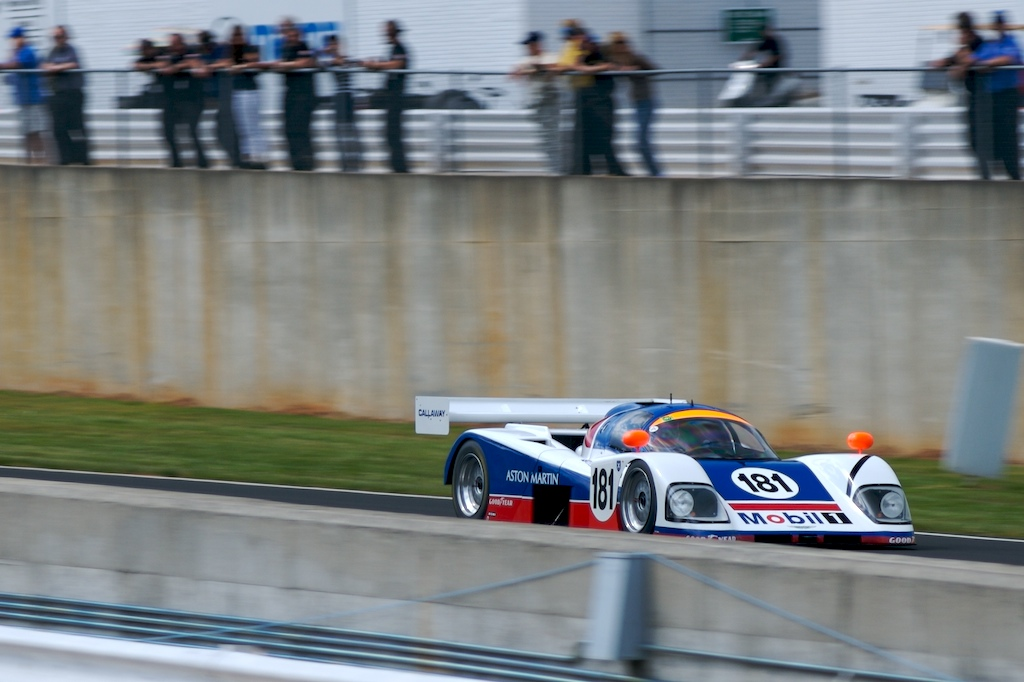
An Aston Martin AMR1 now used in Historic Sportscars Racing in North America

A total of five AMR1 chassis were built.

AMR1/01 is now owned by the Aston Martin Heritage Trust.

AMR1/03 had also been sold on the open market, selling for €294,250 ($359,987) at auction in 2004

AMR1/04 was the first AMR1 to reach auction, selling at a Brooks (now Bonhams)/Aston Martin Lagonda auction in 2000. The car sold for £133,500. Currently AMR1/04 is used in the Historic Sportscar Racing series in North America.

AMR1/05 is currently raced in Europe by owner Paul Whight.

=== Results ===
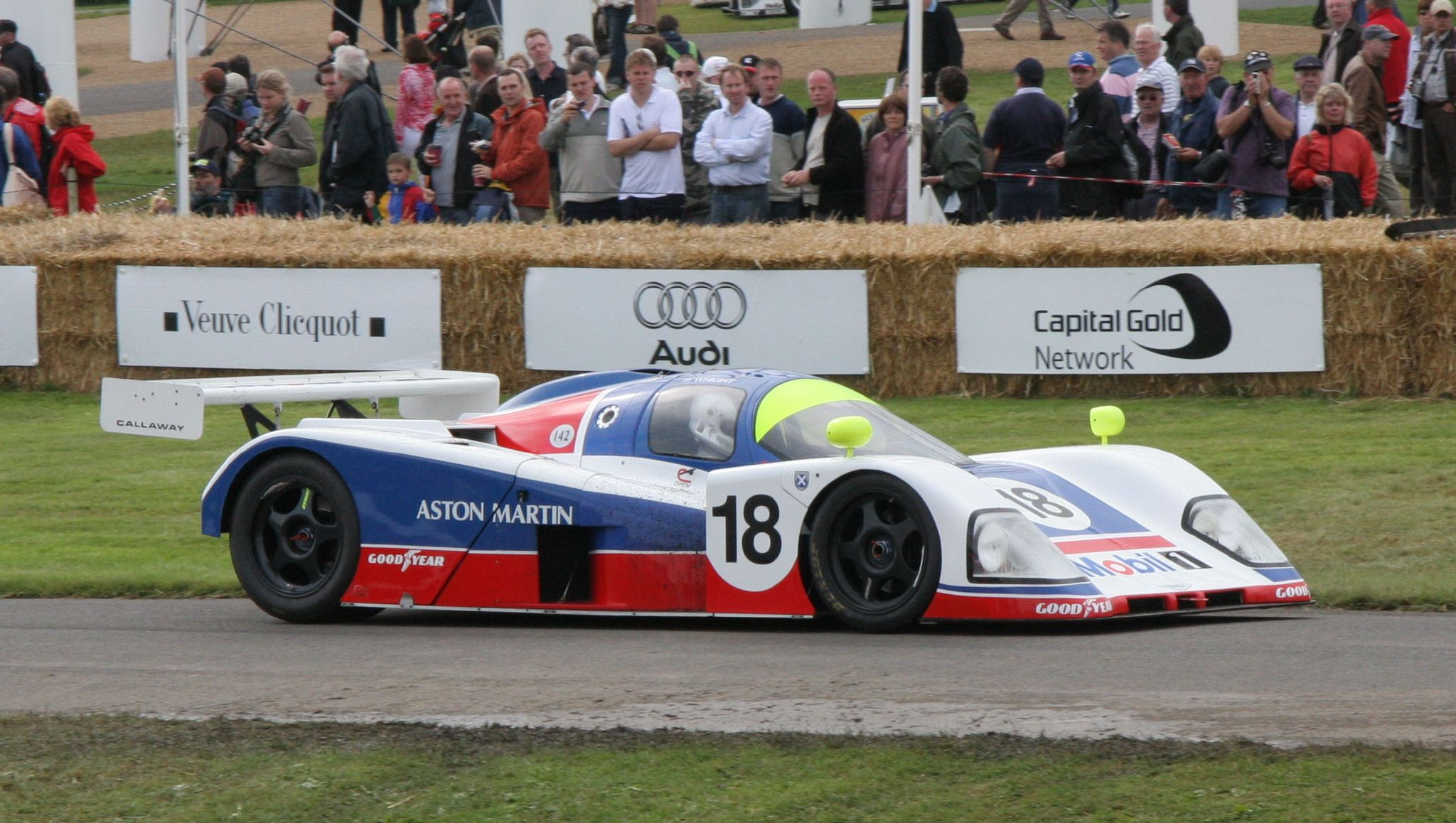
An Aston Martin AMR1 at Goodwood Festival of Speed 2007

Year	Race	Chassis	Drivers	Pos
1989	Dijon 480 km	AMR1/01	(United Kingdom) Brian Redman (United Kingdom) David Leslie	17th
1989	Le Mans	AMR1/01	(United Kingdom) Brian Redman (Republic of Ireland) Michael Roe (Greece) Costas Los	11th
1989	Le Mans	AMR1/03	(United Kingdom) David Leslie (United Kingdom) Ray Mallock (United Kingdom) David Sears	DNF
1989	Brands Hatch	AMR1/04	(United Kingdom) Brian Redman (United Kingdom) David Leslie	4th
1989	Nürburgring	AMR1/04	(United Kingdom) Brian Redman (United Kingdom) David Leslie	8th
1989	Donington	AMR1/04	(Republic of Ireland) Michael Roe (United Kingdom) David Leslie	6th
1989	Spa 480 km	AMR1/04	(Republic of Ireland) Michael Roe (United Kingdom) David Leslie	DNF
1989	Donington	AMR1/05	(United Kingdom) Brian Redman (United Kingdom) David Sears	7th
1989	Spa 480 km	AMR1/05	(United Kingdom) Brian Redman (Sweden) Stanley Dickens	7th
1989	Mexico 480 km	AMR1/05	(United Kingdom) Brian Redman (United Kingdom) David Leslie	8th
