= Kenny Acheson =

British racing driver (born 1957)

- Born: Kenneth Henry Acheson; 27 November 1957 (age 68); Cookstown, Northern Ireland, United Kingdom

Formula One World Championship career
- Nationality: (United Kingdom) British
- Active years: 1983, 1985
- Team: RAM
- Entries: 10 (3 starts)
- Championships: 0
- Wins: 0
- Podiums: 0
- Career points: 0
- Pole positions: 0
- Fastest laps: 0
- First entry: 1983 British Grand Prix
- Last entry: 1985 Italian Grand Prix

Kenneth Henry Acheson (born 27 November 1957) is a British former racing driver from Northern Ireland who competed for RAM Racing in the 1983 and 1985 Formula One seasons. He completed only one of his three race starts, finishing in 12th position in the 1983 South African Grand Prix. In 1985, he was a substitute for Manfred Winkelhock, who was killed in a sportscar race during the season.

== Career ==
=== Early career ===
Born in Cookstown, Acheson was the youngest of three siblings. His father, the owner of an Ulster brickworks, raced in the 1970s on motorcycles and in Formula Ford.

In 1976, Acheson had a test in his father's old Crosslé FF1600 at the local Kirkistown Circuit and in no time was lapping within three seconds of the lap record. He entered his first race later in the year, once again at Kirkistown driving his father's FF1600 Crosslé. He acquitted himself pretty well and his father agreed to buy a new Crosslé for the 1977 season if Kenny quit smoking.

So, equipped with new machinery, Acheson won the 1977 Northern Ireland FF1600 Championship.

=== Further success and Formula 1 ===
For 1978, Acheson moved to England to contest three of the Formula Ford series. Driving one of Alan Cornock's Royales with RMC sponsorship, he won 29 races and all three championships. He also picked up a Grovewood Award at the end of the year.

Moving up to Formula 3 in 1979, Acheson began with a second-hand Ralt but soon ordered a new March 793 in an effort to be more competitive. However he failed to take any Championship wins though he set the fastest lap at the F3 support race for the 1979 British Grand Prix and won three non-championship races.

For 1980, Acheson joined up with Murray Taylor Racing at Stone in Oxfordshire, to contest the Vandervell British F3 Championship. By mid-season, Acheson was leading the Championship from Stefan Johansson who was driving for Project Four Racing. But then Johansson acquired a new Ralt RT3 and closed the gap. At the last race of the Championship, Acheson made a small mistake and Johansson took the title.

Moving up to Formula 2 in 1981, Acheson joined Docking Spitzley Racing driving a Toleman TG280. However, his season ended prematurely with a big accident while racing for the lead with Michele Alboreto around the French street circuit at Pau. Running wheel to wheel, Alboreto left Acheson nowhere to go and he crashed heavily, his car ending up in a tree. With both his legs badly broken he was lucky to survive.

Nevertheless, Acheson returned in 1982 with the Ralt Honda team, finishing seventh in the European Championship.

Acheson was given a works F2 drive with Maurer Motorsport in 1983 and, later in the year, made his F1 debut in one of John McDonald's RAM March F1 cars with RMC sponsorship RAM March F1 car. In seven races, he failed to qualify the cumbersome car on every occasion before he finally made it onto the grid for the South African GP.

Without a drive in 1984, Acheson returned to the RAM team as to replace Manfred Winkelhock who had tragically been killed racing a Kremer Porsche 962C at Mosport Park. With the more competitive Hart-powered RAM 03, he qualified for both the Austrian and Italian GP but his funds dried up and that was the end of his F1 career.

=== Later career ===
Acheson also had a brief flirtation with CART that year. He was entered for the Indy 500 in a Lola T800 Cosworth but didn't drive. He then crashed his March 83C Cosworth at the Meadowlands before failing to qualify for Elkhart Lake and crashing in practice at Laguna Seca in the Skoal Bandit Lola T800 Cosworth.

For the next few years, Acheson made his living in Japan where he raced for Kunimitsu Takahashi's Advan-backed Alpha team in Formula 3000 and sports cars. He won the Japanese Sportscar Championship in 1987 and on the back of that, moved back to Europe in 1988 with Sauber-Mercedes and was due to drive at Le Mans, but the team pulled out in practice.

Acheson embarked on a full season with Sauber-Mercedes in 1989 and took a fine second at Le Mans that year driving with Mauro Baldi, the pair going on to win at Brands Hatch and Spa.

At the end of 1989, Acheson was dropped by Sauber despite his performances and instead moved to Nissan for 1990 for the WSPC season. At Le Mans, he retired the R90CK with a gearbox failure during the warm-up lap.

For Le Mans in 1991, Acheson was part of the Silk Cut Jaguar team, finishing third in the XJR12. In 1992, he was back at Le Mans, this time with Toyota driving the Tony Southgate designed TS010 and scoring another second, though the following year he failed to finish. When the sportscar World Championship ended, Acheson switched to GT racing in Japan with the SARD team. This led to a final visit to the Sarthe in 1995, when he drove the SARD MC8R, retiring after just 14 laps when the car suffered a total brake failure.

In 1996, Acheson went to the Daytona 24 Hours with the Newcastle United football team liveried Lister Storm, sharing the car with Geoff Lees and Tiff Needell. In the dying moments of the race, his Lister was destroyed in a violent crash when he was hit by a slower car. Luckily, he walked away from the scene, and he also decided to walk away from racing altogether.

== Racing record ==
=== Complete European Formula Two Championship results ===
(key) (Races in bold indicate pole position; races in italics indicate fastest lap)

Year	Entrant	Chassis	Engine	1	2	3	4	5	6	7	8	9	10	11	12	13	Pos.	Pts
1981	Docking Spitzley Team Toleman	Lola T850	Hart	SIL; 19	HOC; Ret	THR; Ret	NÜR; 6	VLL; 10	MUG; 15	PAU; Ret	PER	SPA	DON	MIS	MAN; 3		15th	5
1982	Ralt Racing Ltd.	Ralt RH6/82	Honda	SIL; Ret	HOC; 13	THR; 2	NÜR; 4	MUG; 6	VLL; 14	PAU; 5	SPA; 10	HOC; 11	DON; 10	MAN; Ret	PER; Ret	MIS; Ret	7th	12
1983	Maurer Motorsport	Maurer MM83	BMW	SIL; Ret	THR; 10	HOC; 10	NÜR; 9	VLL; 11	PAU; 2	JAR; Ret	DON; 8	MIS	PER	ZOL	MUG		10th	6

=== Japanese Top Formula Championship results ===
(key) (Races in bold indicate pole position; races in italics indicate fastest lap)

Year	Entrant	Chassis	Engine	1	2	3	4	5	6	7	8	9	10	11	Pos.	Pts
1981	Suzuki Racing	Toleman TG280	Hart	SUZ	SUZ	SUZ	SUZ	SUZ; Ret							NC	0
1982	Ralt Racing Ltd.	Ralt RH6/82	Honda	SUZ	FUJ	SUZ	SUZ	SUZ; 15	SUZ; 4						12th	10
1985	Advan Sports Nova	March 85J	Honda	SUZ; 4	FUJ; 3	MIN; 6	SUZ; Ret	SUZ; 5	FUJ; 1	SUZ; 4	SUZ; 8				3rd	66 (69)
1987	Advan Sports Tomei	March 87B	Cosworth	SUZ; 8	FUJ; 16	MIN	SUZ; 10	SUZ; 15	SUG; Ret	FUJ; 7	SUZ; Ret	SUZ; Ret			15th	8
1988	Team Kitamura	March 87B	Mugen-Honda	SUZ; 8	FUJ; Ret	MIN; 9	SUZ; 15	SUG; Ret	FUJ; 14	SUZ	SUZ				NC	0
1989	Team LeMans	Reynard 89D	Mugen-Honda	SUZ	FUJ	MIN	SUZ	SUG; Ret	FUJ; 14	SUZ	SUZ				NC	0
1991	Ad Racing Team	Reynard 91D	Mugen-Honda	SUZ; EX	AUT	FUJ	MIN	SUZ	SUG	FUJ	SUZ	FUJ	SUZ	FUJ	NC	0

=== Complete Formula One results ===
(key)

Year	Team	Chassis	Engine	1	2	3	4	5	6	7	8	9	10	11	12	13	14	15	16	WDC	Pts
1983	RAM Automotive Team March	RAM March 01	Ford Cosworth DFV 3.0 V8	BRA	USW	FRA	SMR	MON	BEL	DET	CAN	GBR; DNQ	GER; DNQ	AUT; DNQ	NED; DNQ	ITA; DNQ	EUR; DNQ	RSA; 12		NC	0
1985	Skoal Bandit Formula 1 Team	RAM 03	Hart 415T 1.5 L4t	BRA	POR	SMR	MON	CAN	DET	FRA	GBR	GER	AUT; Ret	NED; DNQ	ITA; Ret	BEL	EUR	RSA	AUS	NC	0

=== American Open-Wheel racing ===
(key) (Races in bold indicate pole position)

==== CART PPG Indy Car World Series ====
Year	Team	Car	Chassis	Engine	1	2	3	4	5	6	7	8	9	10	11	12	13	14	15	16	Pos.	Pts	Ref
1984	WIT Promotions	47	March 83C	Cosworth DFX V8t	LBH	PHX	INDY	MIL	POR	MEA; 28	CLE	MCH									40th	0	
1984	H&R Racing	82	March 84C	Cosworth DFX V8t									ROA; DNQ	POC	MDO	SAN	MCH	PHX			40th	0	
1984	Forsythe Racing	33	Lola T800	Cosworth DFX V8t															LAG; DNQ	CPL	40th	0	

=== Complete World Sportscar Championship results ===
(key) (Races in bold indicate pole position; races in italics indicate fastest lap)

Year	Entrant	Class	Car	Engine	1	2	3	4	5	6	7	8	9	10	11	Pos.	Pts
1985	John Fitzpatrick Racing	C1	Porsche 956B	Porsche Type 935 2.6 F6t	MUG	MNZ; Ret	SIL									NC	0
1985	John Fitzpatrick Racing	C1	Porsche 962C	Porsche Type 935 2.6 F6t				LMS; DNQ	HOC	MOS	SPA	BRH				NC	0
1985	Richard Lloyd Racing	C1	Porsche 956 Gti	Porsche Type 935 2.6 F6t									FUJ; Ret	SHA		NC	0
1986	Team Ikuzawa	C1	Tom's 86C	Toyota 4T-GT 2.1 L4t	MNZ	SIL	LMS	NOR	BRH	JER	NÜR	SPA	FUJ; Ret			NC	0
1987	Advan Alpha Nova	C1	Porsche 962C	Porsche Type 935 3.0 F6 t	JAR	JER	MNZ	SIL	LMS	NOR	BRH	NÜR	SPA	FUJ; 11		NC	0
1988	Team Sauber Mercedes	C1	Sauber C9	Mercedes-Benz M117 5.0 V8 t	JER	JAR	MNZ	SIL	LMS; DNS	BRN	BRH	NÜR	SPA	FUJ; 5	SAN	NC	0
1989	Team Sauber Mercedes	C1	Sauber C9	Mercedes-Benz M117 5.0 V8 t	SUZ; 2	DIJ; 3	JAR; 5	BRH; 1	NÜR; 2	DON; 2	SPA; 1	MEX; Ret				4th	97 (105)
1990	Nissan Motorsports International	C	Nissan R89C	Nissan VRH35Z 3.5 V8 t	SUZ; Ret											9th	11
1990	Nissan Motorsports International	C	Nissan R90CK	Nissan VRH35Z 3.5 V8 t		MNZ; 7	SIL; Ret	SPA; 3	DIJ; 21	NÜR; 9	DON; 4	CGV; 5	MEX; 4			9th	11
1991	Silk Cut Jaguar	C2	Jaguar XJR-12	Jaguar 7.4L V12	SUZ	MNZ	SIL	LMS; 3	NÜR	MAG	MEX	AUT				24th	12
1992	Toyota Team Tom's	C1	Toyota TS010	Toyota RV10 3.5 V10	MNZ	SIL	LMS; 2	DON	SUZ; Ret	MAG						16th	15

=== Complete 24 Hours of Le Mans results ===
Year	Team	Co-Drivers	Car	Class	Laps	Pos.	Class Pos.
1985	(United Kingdom) John Fitzpatrick Racing	(United Kingdom) Dudley Wood (France) Jean-Louis Schlesser	Porsche 962C	C1	-	DNQ	DNQ
1988	(Switzerland) Team Sauber Mercedes	(West Germany) Klaus Niedzwiedz	Sauber C9-Mercedes	C1	-	DNS	DNS
1989	(West Germany) Team Sauber Mercedes	(Italy) Mauro Baldi (Italy) Gianfranco Brancatelli	Sauber C9-Mercedes	C1	384	**2nd**	**2nd**
1990	(Japan) Nissan Motorsports International	(United Kingdom) Martin Donnelly (France) Olivier Grouillard	Nissan R90CK	C1	0	DNF	DNF
1991	(United Kingdom) Silk Cut Jaguar (United Kingdom) Tom Walkinshaw Racing	(Italy) Teo Fabi (France) Bob Wollek	Jaguar XJR-12	C2	358	**3rd**	**3rd**
1992	(Japan) Toyota Team Tom's	(France) Pierre-Henri Raphanel (Japan) Masanori Sekiya	Toyota TS010	C1	346	**2nd**	**2nd**
1993	(Japan) Toyota Team Tom's	(France) Pierre-Henri Raphanel (United Kingdom) Andy Wallace	Toyota TS010	C1	212	DNF	DNF
1995	(Japan) SARD Co. Ltd.	(France) Alain Ferté (Japan) Tomiko Yoshikawa	SARD MC8-R-Toyota	GT1	14	DNF	DNF

=== Complete International Formula 3000 results ===
(key)

Year	Entrant	Chassis	Engine	1	2	3	4	5	6	7	8	9	10	11	Pos.	Pts
1986	Eddie Jordan Racing	March 86B	Ford Cosworth	SIL	VLL	PAU	SPA	IMO	MUG	PER	ÖST; Ret	BIR	BUG	JAR	NC	0
