= David Sears (racing driver) =

British racing driver (born 1955)

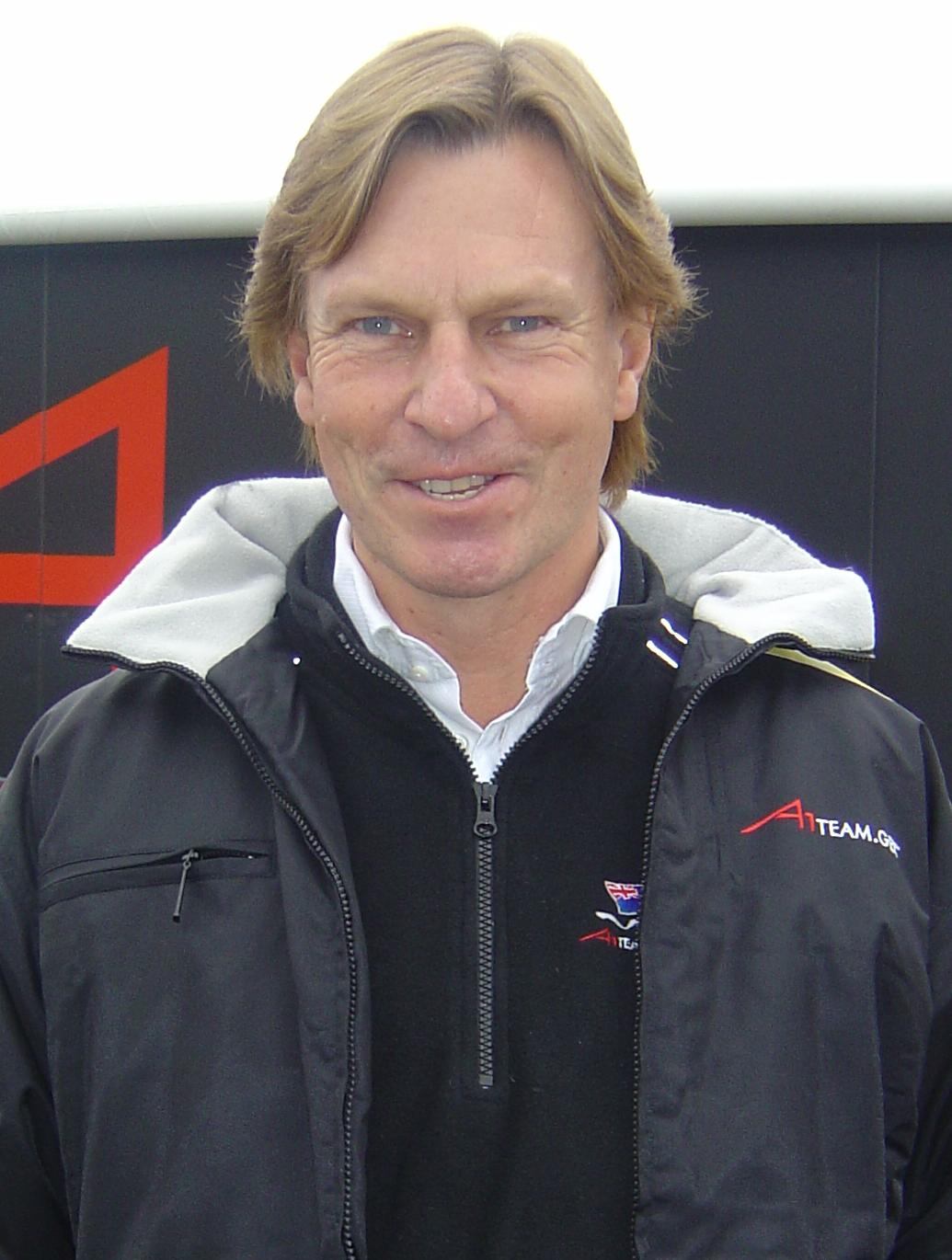
- Sears in 2007
- Nationality: (United Kingdom) British
- Born: David John Charles Sears; 9 December 1955 (age 70) Norwich, Norfolk, England

British Saloon / Touring Car Championship
- Years active: 1985–1986, 1988–1990
- Teams: Industrial Control Services Ltd; Hughes of Beaconsfield; Kaliber Racing; John Maguire Racing; ICS plc
- Starts: 8
- Wins: 2
- Poles: 0
- Fastest laps: 0 (1 in class)
- Best finish: 21st in 1985

Championship titles
- 1979 1979: British Formula Ford 1600; BARC Formula Ford 1600

David John Charles Sears (born 9 December 1955) is a British businessman and former racing driver. He is the son of touring car legend Jack Sears.

== Biography ==
The Sears dynasty has been involved in motor racing for nearly 100 years and four generations. David won two British Formula Ford Championships in 1979 and then raced in Formula 3 against Nigel Mansell and Stefan Johansson with much success. Sears was asked to test for Lotus in Formula One but ultimately Nigel Mansell got the drive and Sears switched to racing touring cars for Ford, Toyota and Jaguar in the European Touring Car Championship. He then raced for Toyota in Japan in Group C and Pontiac in the USA. In 1989, Sears raced for Aston Martin in the World Sports Car Championship and Le Mans. In 1990, Sears finished third at Le Mans in a Porsche 962 with Tiff Needell and Anthony Reid.

Sears had started his own racing team in 1987 and in 1992 he stopped racing to concentrate on his racing team and other business activities. His racing teams under David Sears Motorsport and Super Nova have won 16 Championships in 26 years and produced more than 20 Formula One drivers, including Jan Magnussen, Taki Inoue, Ricardo Zonta, Juan Pablo Montoya, Mark Webber and Sebastian Bourdais. Sears has also managed several of these drivers.

Sears is the great-grandson of John Sears who founded Sears Holdings, the boot and shoe empire in Northampton. John Sears was the first person to establish chain shops throughout Great Britain. He died aged 46 owning two shoe factories and over 900 freehold shops. With no tax planning and tax at 98% the family lost the business to Charles Clore in one of the biggest corporate takeovers at the time. The remnants of that empire and some of the best prime retail sites in Great Britain are now owned by Philip Green and his company Arcadia for Topshop and BHS.

Sears may have inherited some business acumen from his ancestors and helped Nova Group in Japan develop their language school business to be placed on the Tokyo Stock Exchange. In fact they were business partners for fourteen years with the Super Nova Racing Team.

Sears has also been involved as a director of Thunderball, a mining company in West Africa and more recently has helped Dr. Doug Linman create the MQ Corporation in the US and UK to launch Solar Liquid Power as a new form of green energy.

== Racing record ==
=== Complete British Saloon / Touring Car Championship results ===
(key) Races in bold indicate pole position. Races in italics indicate fastest lap (1 point awarded – 1987–1989 in class)

Year	Team	Car	Class	1	2	3	4	5	6	7	8	9	10	11	12	13	Overall Pos	Pts	Class Pos
1985	Industrial Control Services Ltd.	Ford Sierra XR4Ti	A	SIL	OUL	THR	DON	THR	SIL	DON	SIL	SNE	BRH	BRH ovr:2 cls:2	SIL		21st	6	8th
1986	Hughes of Beaconsfield	Toyota Celica Supra	A	SIL	THR	SIL	DON	BRH ovr:3 cls:3	SNE	BRH	DON	SIL					23rd	4	9th
1988	Kaliber Racing	Ford Sierra RS500	A	SIL	OUL	THR	DON ovr:1‡ cls:1‡	THR	SIL	SIL	BRH	SNE	BRH	BIR			25th	9	11th
1988	John Maguire Racing	BMW M3	B												DON; Ret	SIL; Ret	25th	9	NC
1989	Labatt's Team	Ford Sierra RS500	A	OUL	SIL	THR	DON ovr:3‡ cls:3‡	THR	SIL	SIL	BRH	SNE	BRH	BIR			33rd	7	11th
1989	Kaliber Racing	Ford Sierra RS500	A												DON ovr:4 cls:4	SIL	33rd	7	11th
1990	ICS plc	Ford Sierra RS500	A	OUL	DON ovr:1‡† cls:1‡†	THR	SIL	OUL	SIL	BRH	SNE	BRH	BIR	DON	THR	SIL	NC	0	NC

‡ Endurance driver

† Not eligible for points.

=== Complete World Touring Car Championship results ===
(key) (Races in bold indicate pole position) (Races in italics indicate fastest lap)

Year	Team	Car	1	2	3	4	5	6	7	8	9	10	11	DC	Pts
1987	(United Kingdom) Team Istel	Rover Vitesse	MNZ	JAR	DIJ	NÜR	SPA	BNO	SIL; Ret	BAT	CLD	WEL	FJI	NA	0

=== 24 Hours of Le Mans results ===
Year	Team	Co-Drivers	Car	Class	Laps	Pos.	Class Pos.
1989	(United Kingdom) Aston Martin (United Kingdom) Ecurie Ecosse	(United Kingdom) David Leslie (United Kingdom) Ray Mallock	Aston Martin AMR1	C1	153	DNF	DNF
1990	(Japan) Alpha Racing Team	(United Kingdom) Tiff Needell (United Kingdom) Anthony Reid	Porsche 962C	C1	352	**3rd**	**3rd**
