= Nick Adams (racing driver) =

British racing driver

Nick Adams (born 7 August 1948) is a British former racing driver.

Adams raced in British Formula Atlantic competition in 1980 and 1981. He began racing part-time in the World Sportscar Championship in 1985 and raced there until 1992. He made his 24 Hours of Le Mans debut for Chamberlain Engineering driving a Spice SE89C in 1989. He drove that car for Chamberlain until 1993. He made a single British F2 start in 1992 for Madgwick International. He made his last Le Mans drive in 1995 driving a GT2 Class Porsche 911 to sixth in class. Adams rounded out his career driving a Jaguar XJ220 for Chamberlain in one race of the Global GT Championship in 1996, then returning to racing in 2006 to make six starts in the FIA GT3 European Championship in an Ascari KZ1R to 24th in points.
