= Toyota 89C-V =

Racing automobile

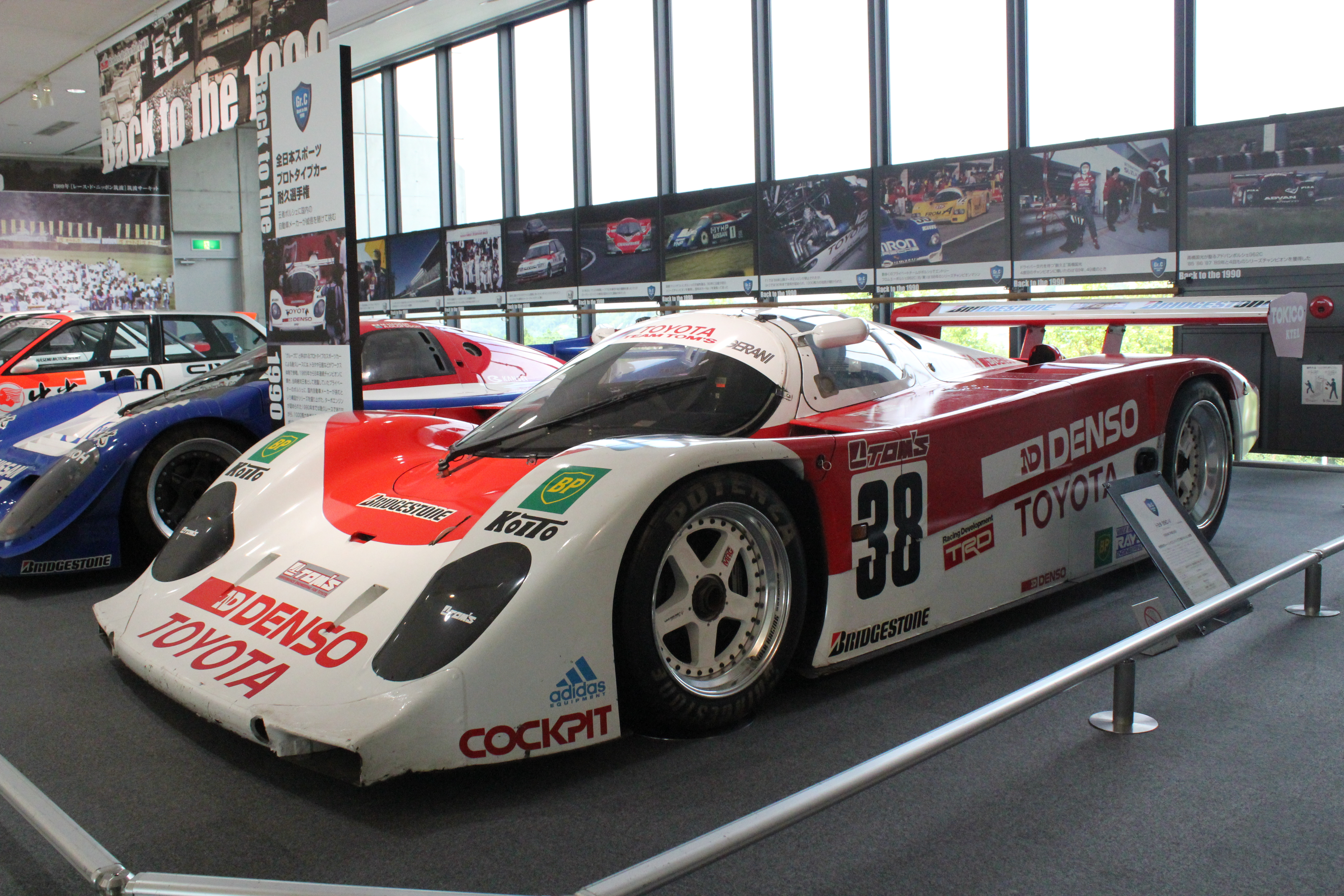
Toyota 89C-V

The Toyota 89C-V is a Group C sports prototype racing car, developed and built by Toyota intended to participate in the World Sportscar Championship, the 24 Hours of Le Mans, and the All-Japan Japanese Sports-Prototype Championship. The chassis is designed by Japanese company Dome. It is powered by a turbocharged 3.2 L (200 cu in) Toyota R32 V8 engine, producing 800 hp (600 kW). It won 2 races, scored 4 podium finishes, and clinched 3 pole positions.
