= Spice SE89C =

Sports prototype race car

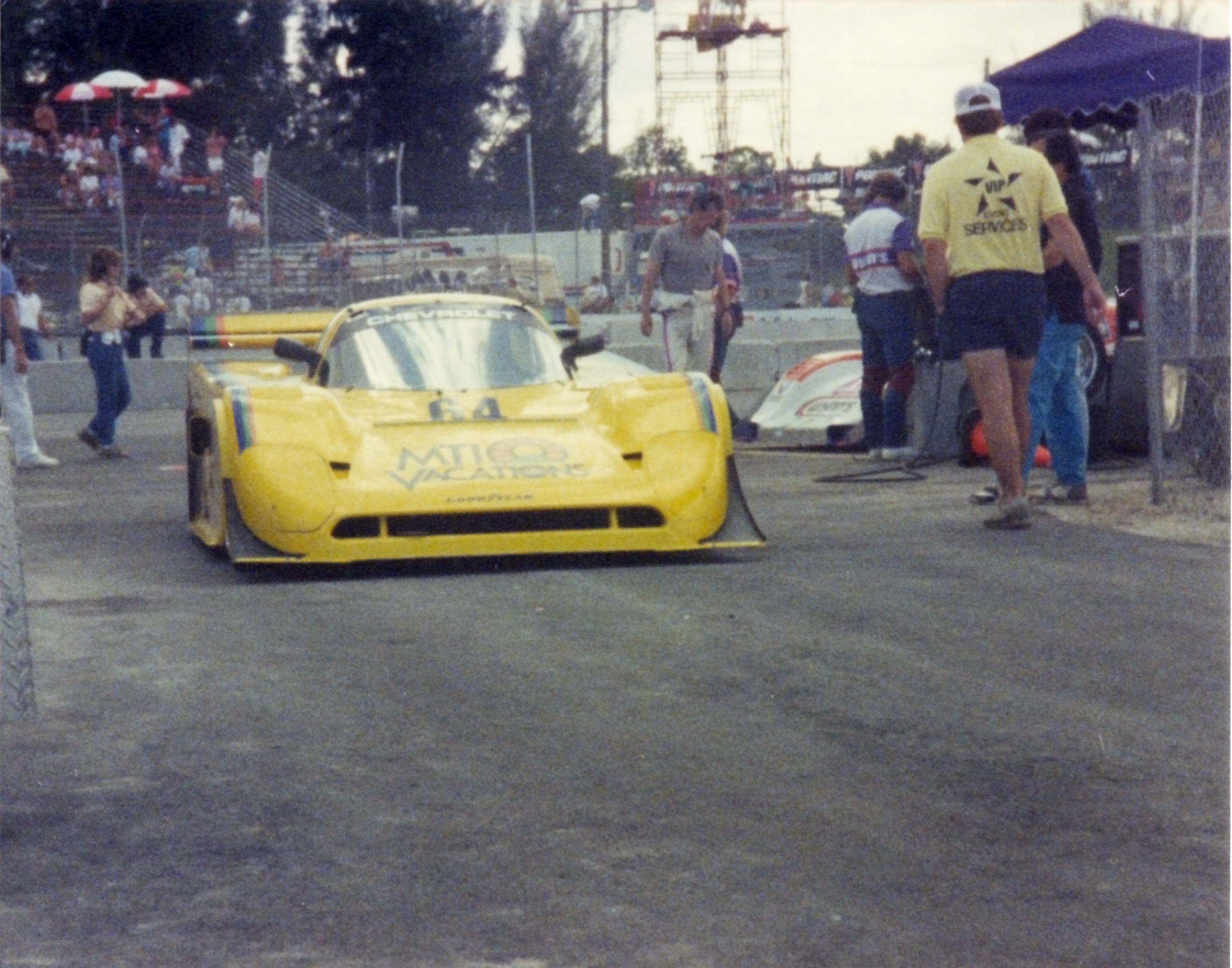
- Category: Group C1; Group C2
- Designer(s): Graham Humphrys

Technical specifications
- Chassis: Aluminum honeycomb monocoque covered in carbon fiber composite and kevlar body
- Suspension (front): double wishbones, coil springs over shock absorbers, anti-roll bar
- Suspension (rear): double wishbones, rocker-actuated coil springs over shock absorbers, anti-roll bar
- Length: 4,600 mm (181 in)
- Width: 1,830 mm (72 in)
- Height: 1,042 mm (41 in)
- Axle track: 1,480 mm (58 in) (front); 1,460 mm (57 in)
- Wheelbase: 2,670 mm (105 in)
- Engine: Ford-DFV/DFL/DFZ 3.3–3.9 L (201.4–238.0 cu in) 90° V8 DOHC naturally-aspirated mid-engined Chevrolet 6.3 L (384.4 cu in) 90° V8 OHV naturally-aspirated mid-engined Ferrari 3.0 L (183.1 cu in) 90° V8 DOHC twin-turbocharged mid-engined
- Transmission: Hewland DCB 5-speed manual
- Power: 465–700 hp (347–522 kW)
- Weight: 710–750 kg (1,565–1,653 lb) (Group C2); 900 kg (1,984 lb) (Group C1)
- Brakes: AP Racing brake discs
- Tires: Avon; Goodyear

Competition history
Entries	Wins	Podiums	Poles
97	8	15	9

The Spice SE89C is a Group C1 and Group C2 sports prototype race car, designed, developed, and built by British manufacturer, Spice Engineering, for sports car racing in the World Sportscar Championship and IMSA GTP Championship, in 1989.

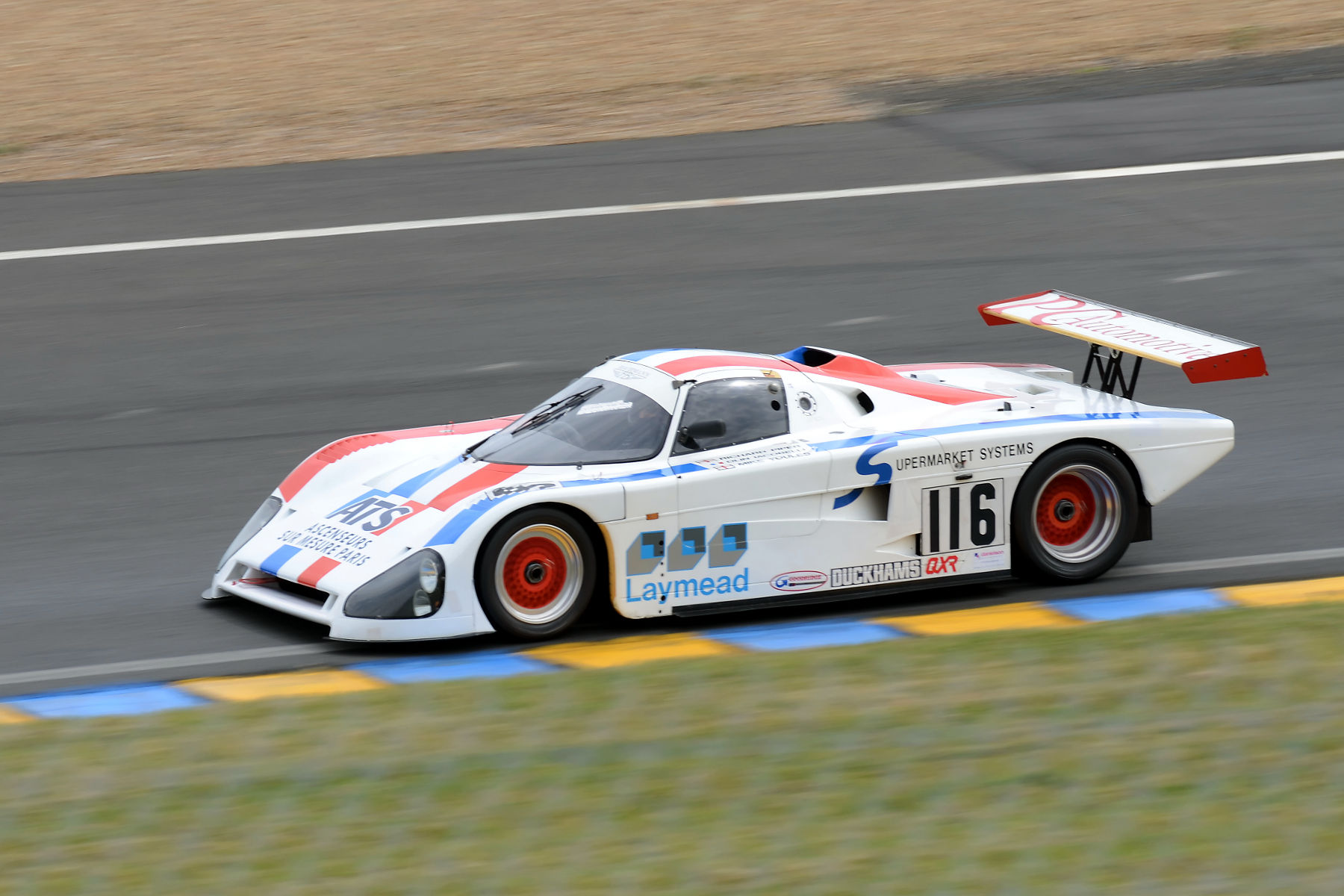
Spice SE89C 24 Hours of Le Mans 1990, photographed in 2013

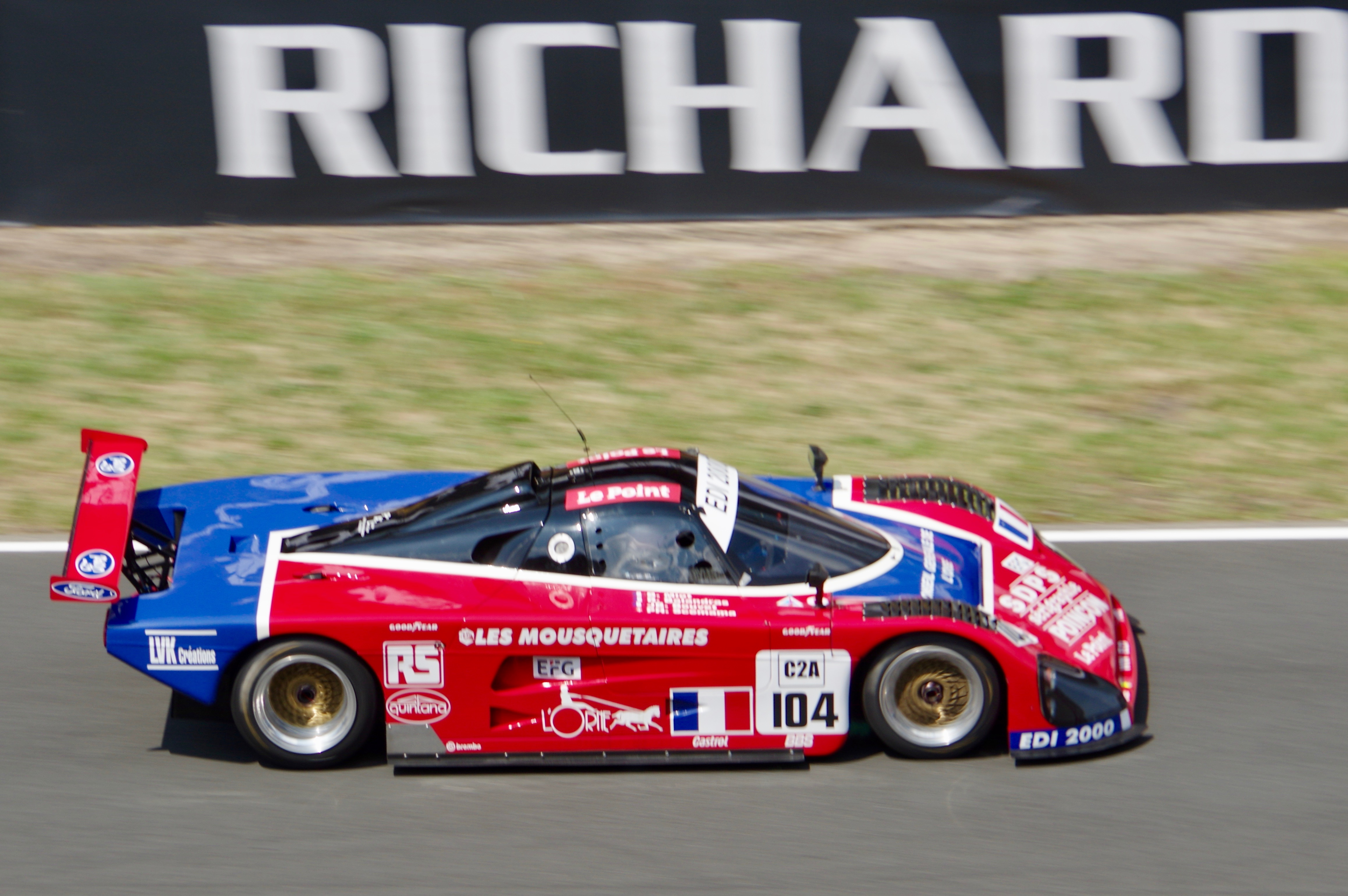
Spice SE89C at the Le Mans Classic in 2018

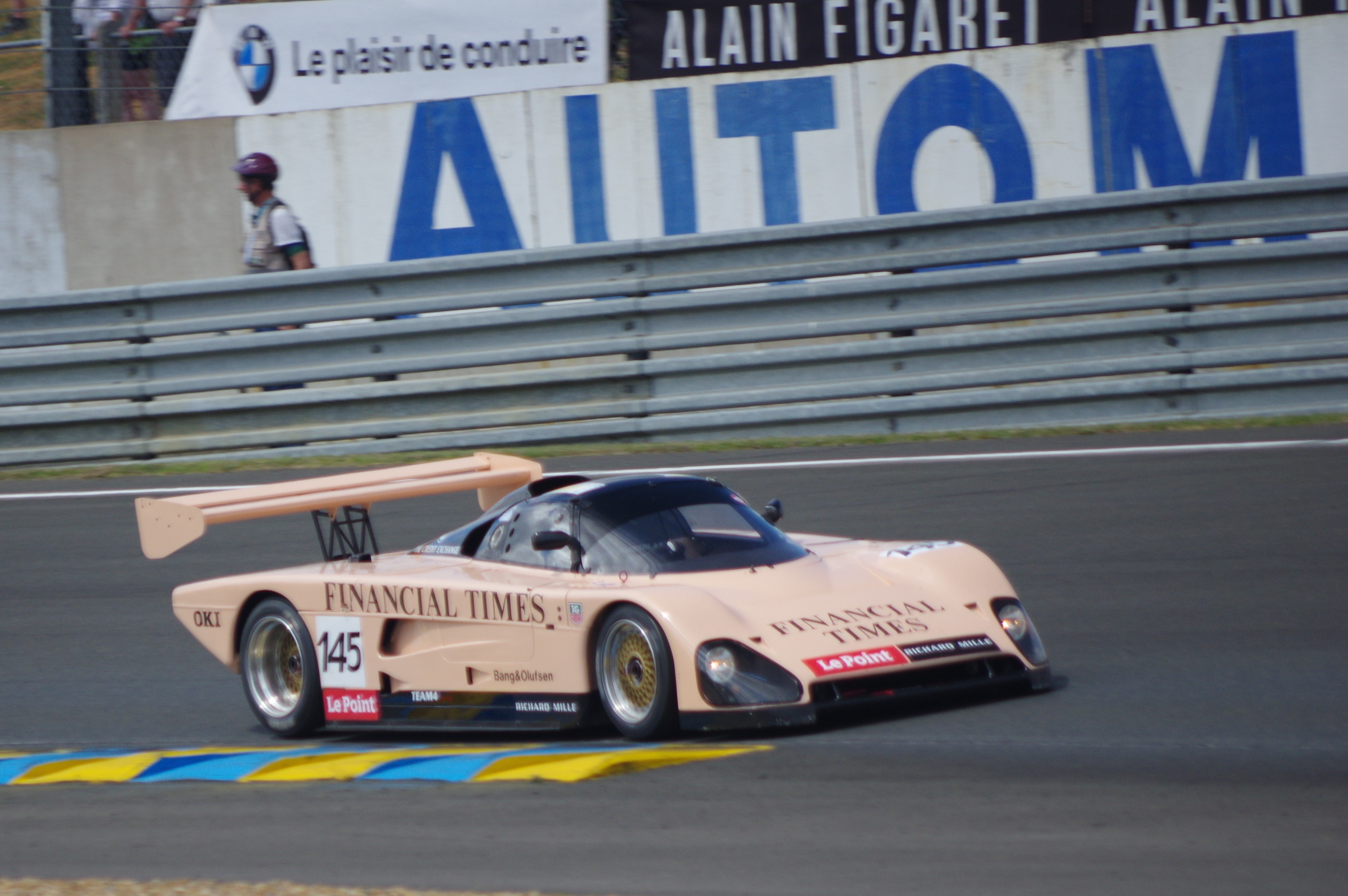
Spice SE89C at the Le Mans Classic in 2016

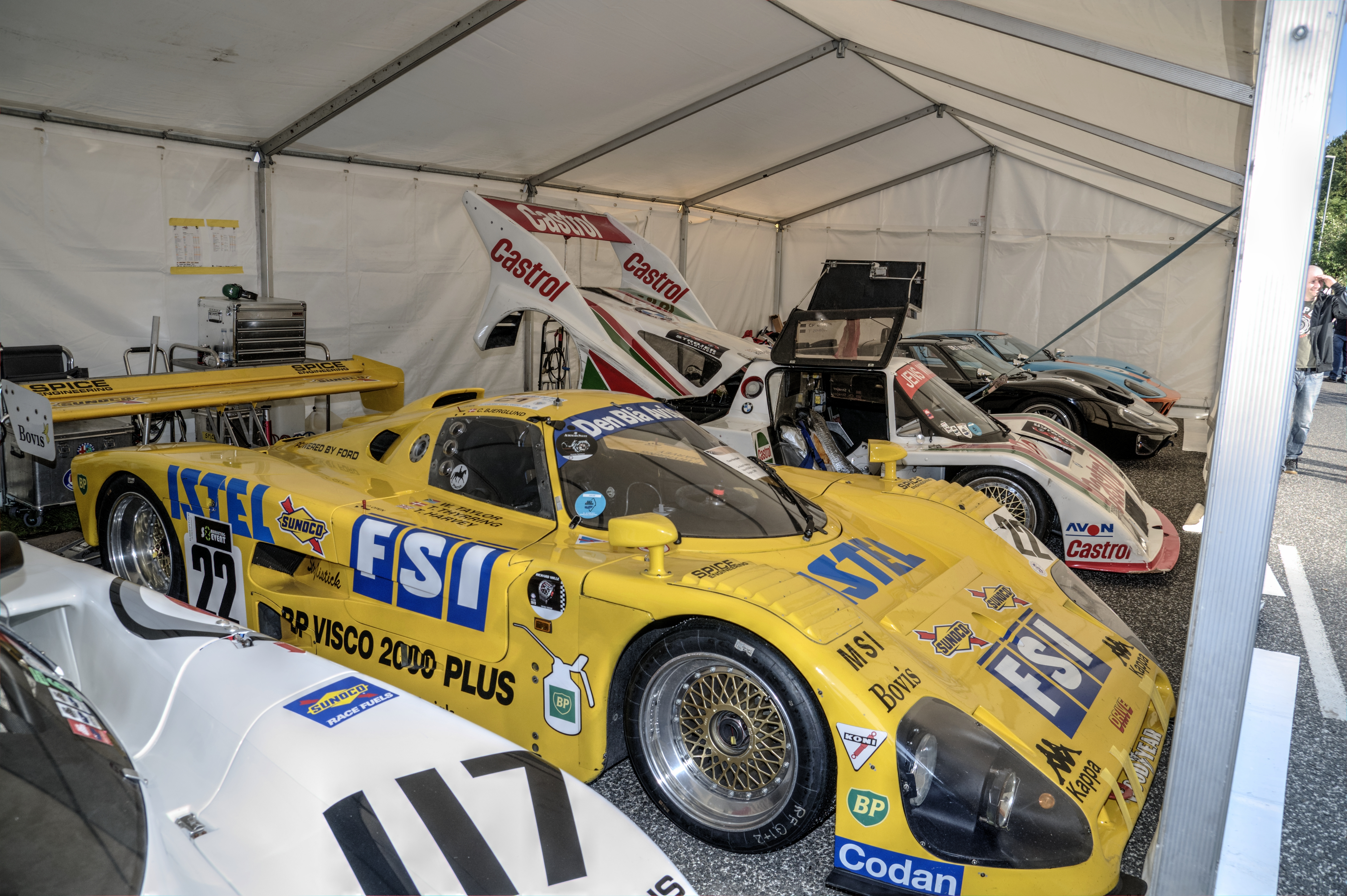
Spice SE89C, pictured in 2014

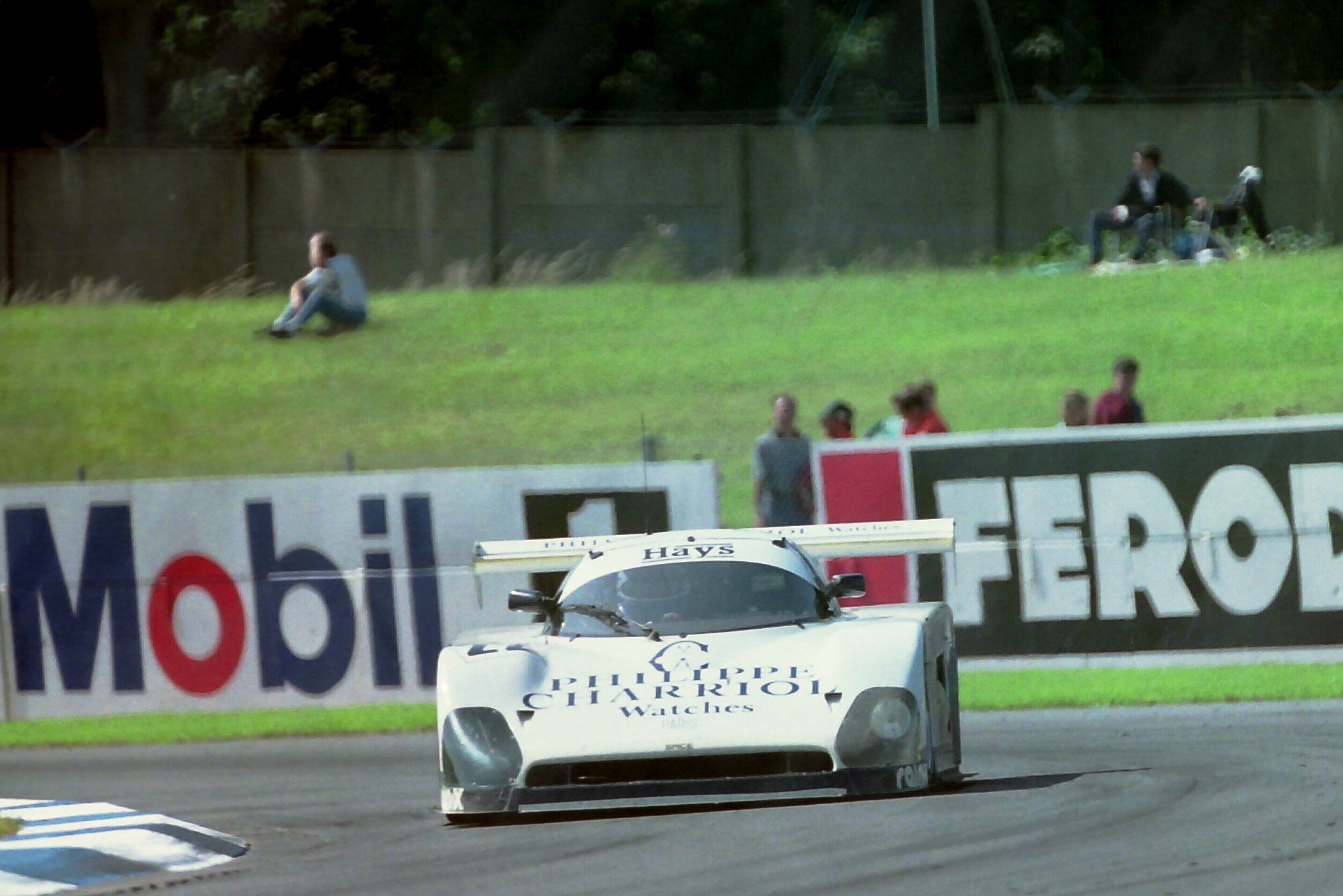
Spice SE89C at Donington Park in 1992

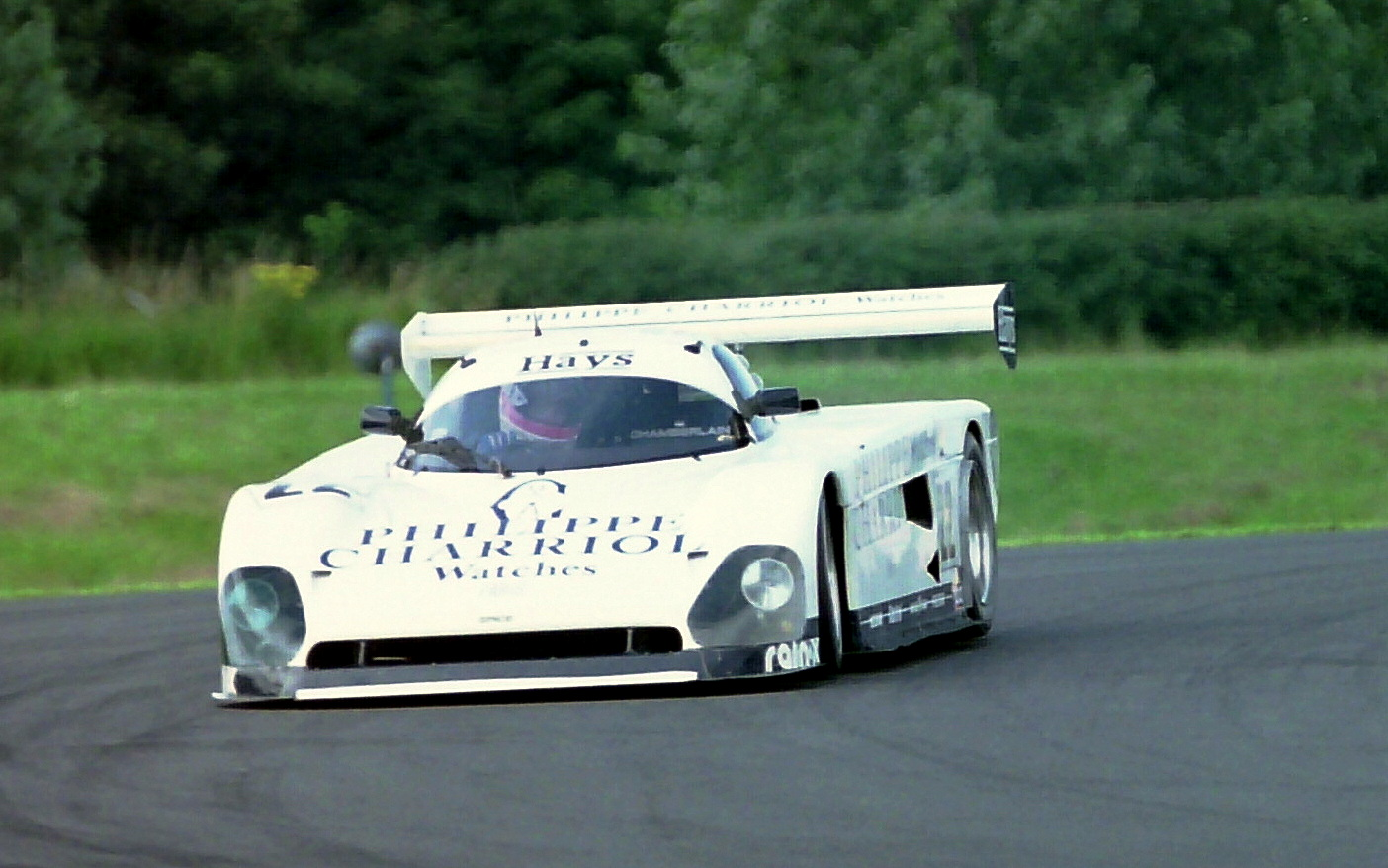
Spice SE89C at Donington Park in 1992
