= Michele Alboreto =

Italian racing driver (1956–2001)

- Alboreto at the 1986 Brazilian Grand Prix
- Born: 23 December 1956; Milan, Lombardy, Italy
- Died: 25 April 2001 (aged 44); Lausitzring, Brandenburg, Germany
- Cause of death: Single vehicle collision whilst testing the Audi R8
- Spouse: Nadia Astorri (m. 1982)
- Children: 2

Formula One World Championship career
- Nationality: (Italy) Italian
- Active years: 1981–1994
- Team(s): Tyrrell, Ferrari, Larrousse, Arrows, Footwork, Scuderia Italia, Minardi
- Entries: 215 (194 starts)
- Championships: 0
- Wins: 5
- Podiums: 23
- Career points: 186.5
- Pole positions: 2
- Fastest laps: 5
- First entry: 1981 San Marino Grand Prix
- First win: 1982 Caesars Palace Grand Prix
- Last win: 1985 German Grand Prix
- Last entry: 1994 Australian Grand Prix

24 Hours of Le Mans career
- Years: 1981–1983, 1996–2000
- Teams: Martini, Joest, Porsche, Audi
- Best finish: 1st (1997)
- Class wins: 1 (1997)

Michele Alboreto (Italian pronunciation: [miˈkɛːle alboˈreːto]; 23 December 1956 – 25 April 2001) was an Italian racing driver, who competed in Formula One from 1981 to 1994. Alboreto was runner-up in the Formula One World Drivers' Championship in 1985 with Ferrari, and won five Grands Prix across 14 seasons. In endurance racing, Alboreto won the 24 Hours of Le Mans in 1997 with Joest, as well as the 12 Hours of Sebring in 2001 with Audi.

Alboreto's career in motorsport began in 1976, racing a car he and a number of his friends had built in the Formula Monza series. The car, however, achieved very little success and two years later Alboreto moved up to Formula Three. Wins in the Italian Formula Three championship and a European Formula Three Championship crown in 1980 paved the way for his entrance into Formula One with the Tyrrell team.

Two wins, the first in the final round of the 1982 season in Las Vegas, and the second a year later in Detroit, earned Alboreto a place with the Ferrari team. Alboreto took three wins for the Italian team and challenged Alain Prost for the 1985 Championship, eventually losing out by twenty points. The following three seasons were less successful, however, and at the end of the 1988 season, the Italian left Ferrari and re-signed with his former employers Tyrrell, where he stayed until joining Larrousse midway through 1989.

Further seasons with Footwork, Scuderia Italia and Minardi followed during the tail end of his F1 career. In 1995, Alboreto moved on to sportscars and a year later the American IndyCar series. He took his final major victories, the 1997 Le Mans 24 Hours and 2001 Sebring 12 Hours, with German manufacturers Porsche and Audi, respectively. In 2001, a month after his Sebring victory, he was killed testing an Audi R8 at the Lausitzring in Germany.

== Career ==
=== 1976–1981: Junior formulae ===
Alboreto started his career in 1976 racing in Formula Monza with a car he and his friends built, known as the "CMR". The car itself proved to be uncompetitive and in 1978 Alboreto, now in a more competitive March, moved over to Formula Italia where he began to take race wins. Two years later Alboreto moved up to Formula Three, racing in a Euroracing-entered March-Toyota in both the European and Italian series. In his début Formula Three season, Alboreto finished 6th and 2nd respectively in the two championships, scoring three wins in the Italian series.

In 1980, Alboreto took the European crown and finished third in the Italian championship, taking five wins between the two series. An appearance in the British Championship was also made that year.

Alboreto's European title earned Alboreto a move into Formula Two, a feeder series for Formula One, with the Minardi team. He scored Minardi's only F2 victory, at Misano, during the 1981 season where he finished eighth in the championship.

=== 1980–1983: Sportscars ===
Despite his career in open wheel racing, Alboreto was chosen by Lancia to be part of their official squad in the World Championship for Makes, running in rounds which did not conflict with his other races. He shared the Group 5 category Lancia Beta Montecarlo with Walter Röhrl or Eddie Cheever on four occasions during the 1980 season, scoring three second-place finishes and a fourth.

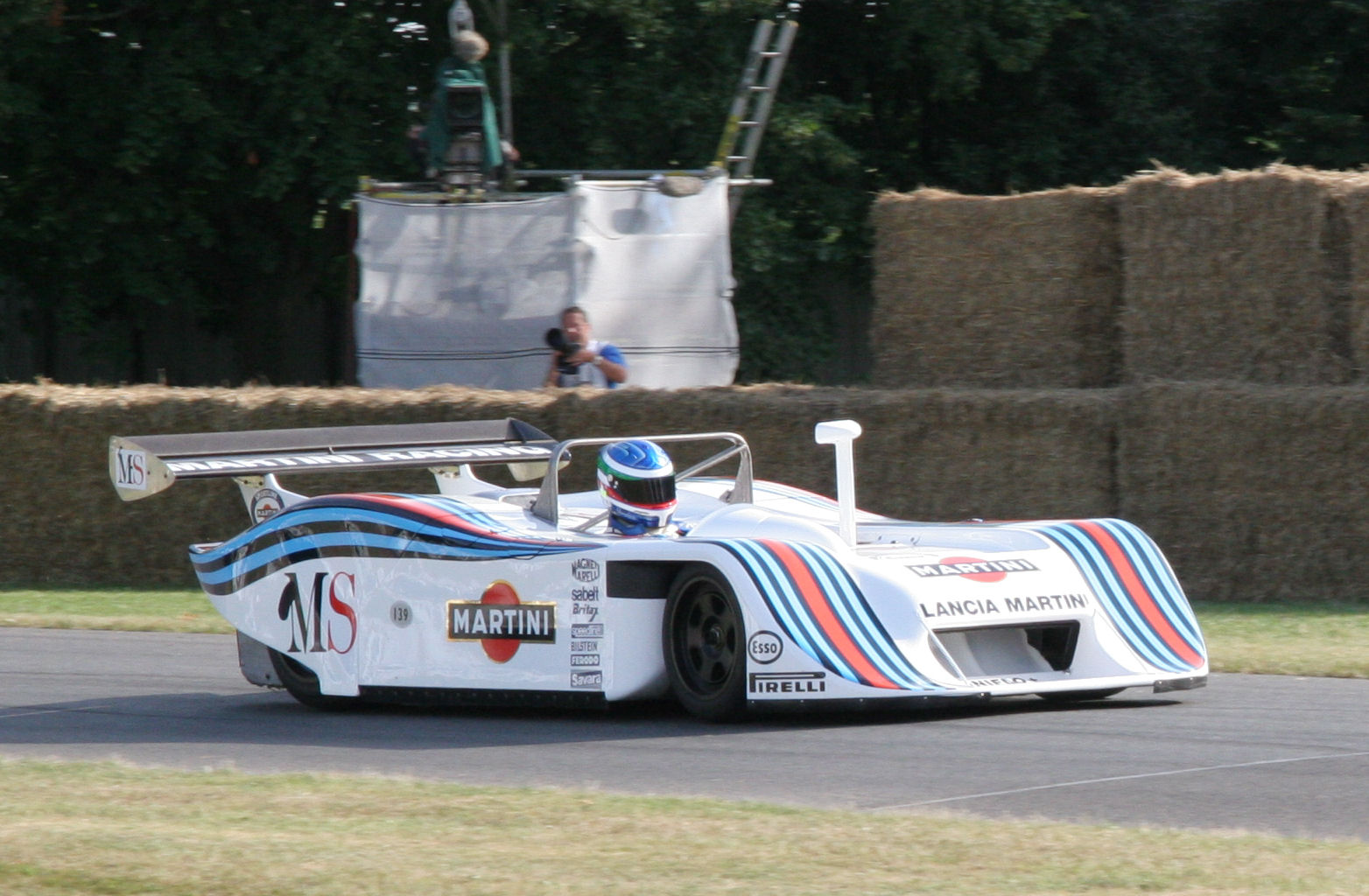
A Lancia LC1 which Alboreto drove to three victories during the 1982 World Endurance Championship.

Alboreto again ran a partial schedule in 1981 even though he was also running Formula Two and Formula One. This season included his first participation in the 24 Hours of Le Mans. He earned an eighth-place finish overall, second in class, and was the highest-finishing Lancia. He followed this with his first win in the championship, at the Six Hours of Watkins Glen with co-driver Riccardo Patrese. Alboreto finished the year 52nd in the Drivers' Championship, the highest-ranked Lancia driver.

When Lancia chose to move to a new class of competition with the Lancia LC1 as the championship concentrated solely on endurance races in 1982, further success came for Alboreto. A small schedule for the championship, as well as an emphasis on European circuits, allowed him to compete in every race that year. Although the LC1 suffered from mechanical problems on its debut, Alboreto and teammate Patrese were able to rebound to earn a victory at the 1000 km of Silverstone. Teo Fabi joined the duo for the 1000 km of the Nürburgring, where they once again earned a victory. He was not able to repeat his previous success at Le Mans when the LC1's engine failed, and was unable to complete an event at Spa when the car broke in the closing laps. A third victory was earned by Alboreto and new teammate Piercarlo Ghinzani at their home circuit, Mugello. The final two races of the World Championship season had Alboreto's car eliminated from contention due to accidents. At the end of the season, he had secured fifth in the Drivers' Championship.

Lancia changed classes and cars once again in 1983 World Sportscar Championship season, but Alboreto remained as one of the team's primary drivers. He brought the new Lancia LC2 to a ninth-place finish in its debut at the 1000 km of Monza, but the new car struggled to finish the next few races of the season. His entries would not finish another race until round five, where he earned eleventh. While Lancia chose to skip later rounds of the championship, he would not return to the team in order to concentrate fully on his commitments to Formula One. His troubles with the LC2 and early departure from the team earned him only two points in the championship.

=== Formula One ===
==== 1981–1983: Tyrrell ====
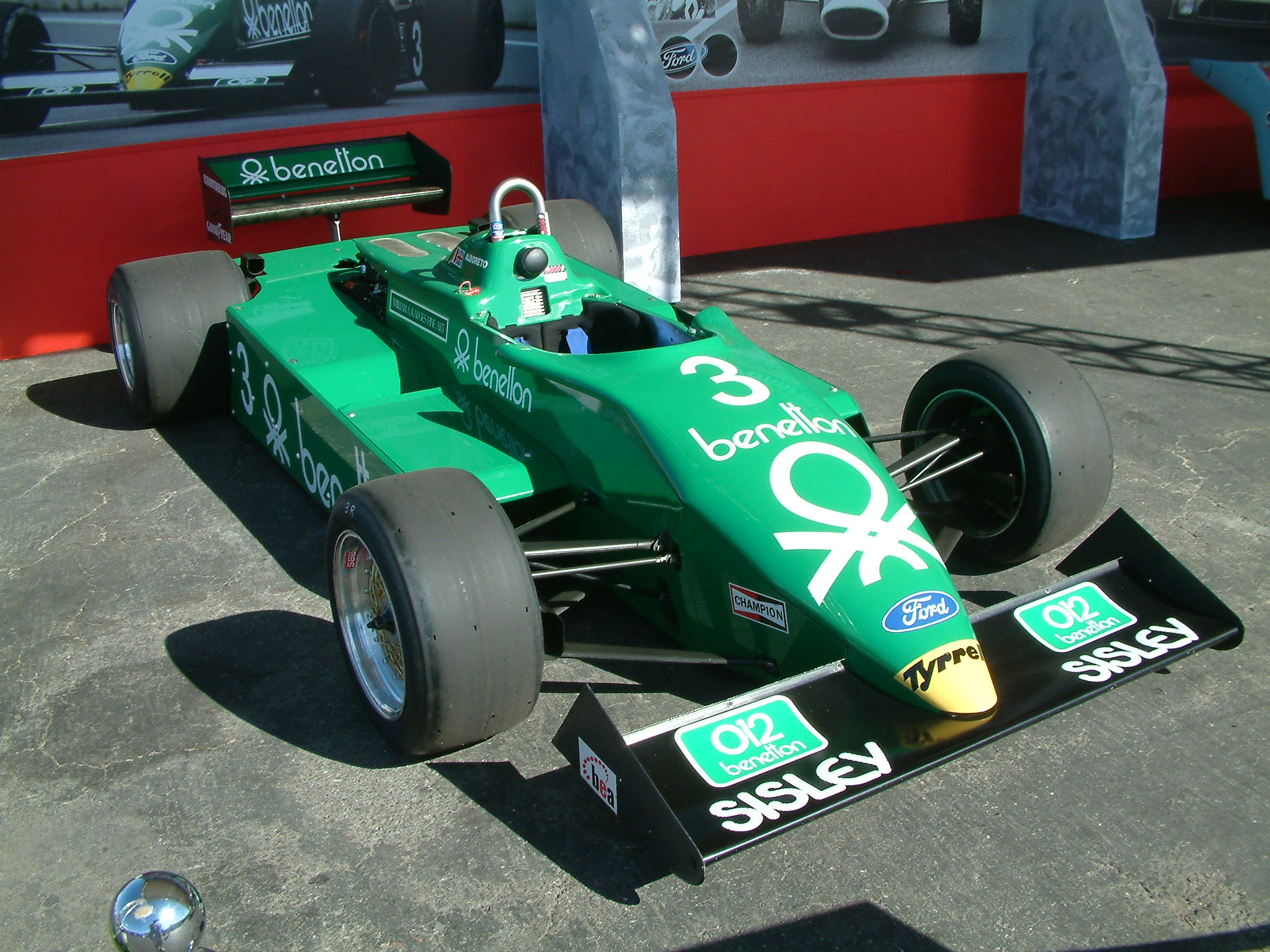
The Tyrrell 011 used by Alboreto during the 1982 and 1983 seasons, a car which helped the Italian win the 1982 Las Vegas Grand Prix and the 1983 Detroit Grand Prix. Seen here in its 1983 livery.

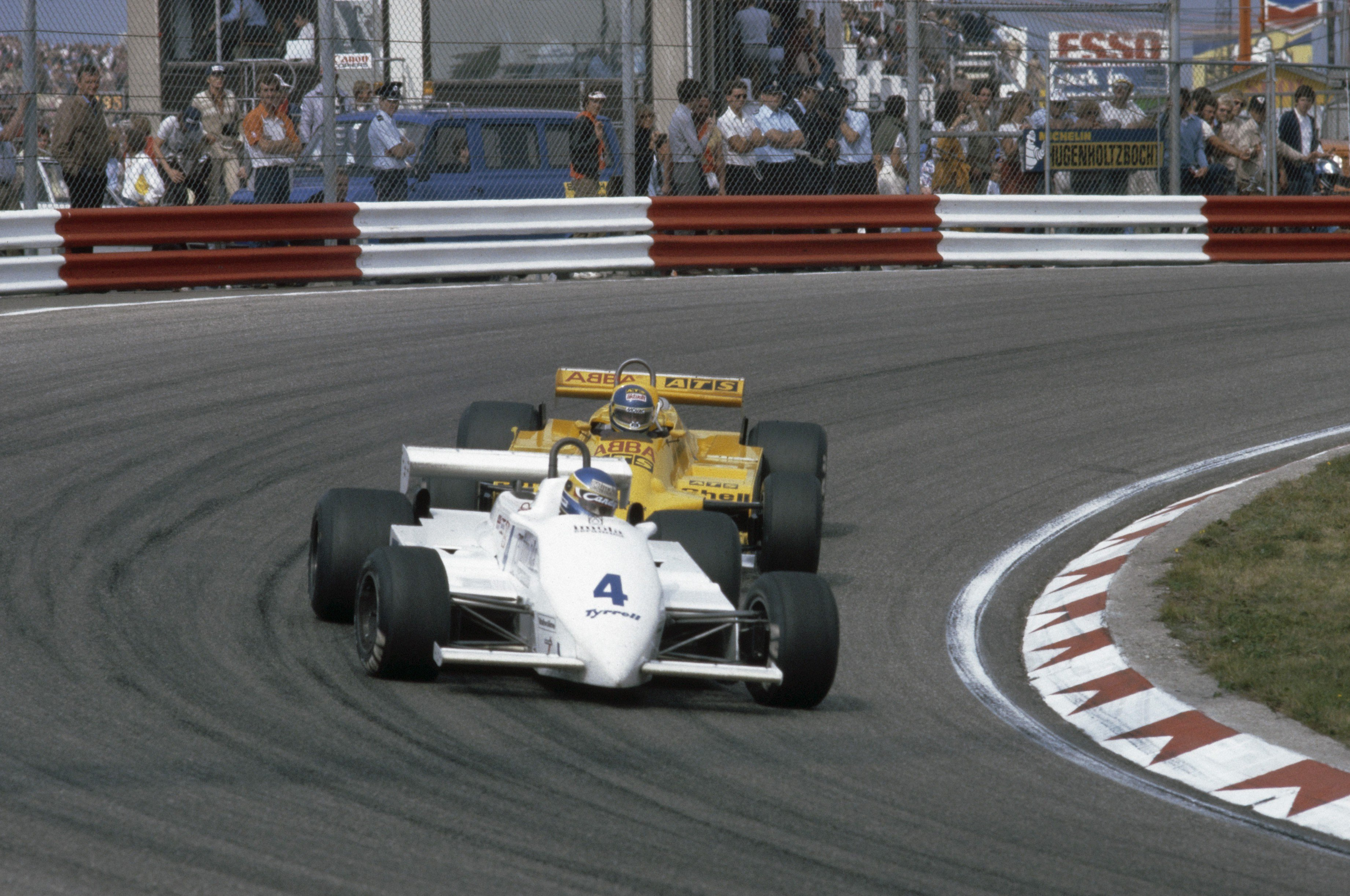
Alboreto driving for Tyrrell at the 1981 Dutch Grand Prix.

At the age of 24, Alboreto made his Formula One debut at the 1981 San Marino Grand Prix for the Cosworth-powered Tyrrell Racing team, replacing Ricardo Zunino after the Argentine failed to impress team boss Ken Tyrrell. Unfortunately for the Italian, a collision with fellow countryman Beppe Gabbiani put him out of the race after completing 31 of the 60 laps. Alboreto failed to score a single point during his debut year, his highest position being ninth at the Dutch Grand Prix.

In comparison to the previous season, Alboreto had a more successful 1982 campaign. The Italian took the first podium of his Grand Prix career at Imola and, at the final round in Las Vegas, Alboreto took his first Grand Prix win. He is the last winner of the Caesars Palace Grand Prix as the following year, the track was axed from the calendar. Alboreto scored a total of 25 points during his second season of F1, finishing as the top Italian in eighth place overall.

Despite a win in Detroit, registered as not only the last victory for a naturally aspirated car until the end of the turbo-era in 1989, but the 155th and last F1 victory for the Cosworth DFV (technically Alboreto's Tyrrell carried the DFV's 1983 development, the DFY), after Nelson Piquet's leading Brabham suffered a rear tyre deflation in the closing stages, Alboreto failed to finish in the points consistently and, with only one further points finish at Zandvoort, he finished the season with ten points and down in twelfth position. However, it was announced that the Italian would partner René Arnoux at Ferrari. Replacing Patrick Tambay, he became the first Italian driver to race for the marque since Arturo Merzario in 1973. Allegedly, by signing Alboreto, Enzo Ferrari broke his own personal rule about hiring an Italian driver for his Formula One team.

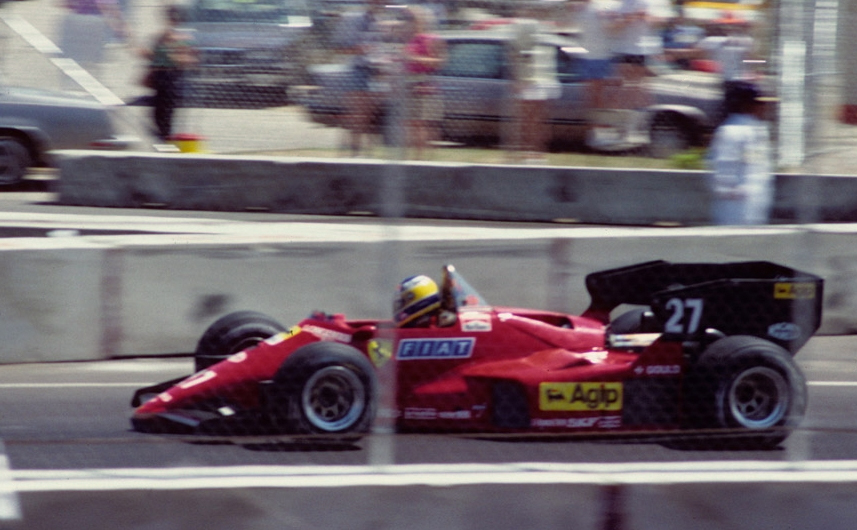
Alboreto at the 1984 Dallas Grand Prix. The Ferrari driver retired from the race after spinning off the track with 13 laps remaining.

==== 1984–1988: Ferrari ====
In his debut season for Ferrari, Alboreto took victory in the third round at Zolder becoming the first Italian driver to win an F1 Grand Prix for Ferrari since Ludovico Scarfiotti won the 1966 Italian Grand Prix. He finished on the podium a further three times: at the Österreichring where he finished third; Ferrari's home circuit of Monza where he finished second; and at the Nürburgring, where he also finished in second place despite running out of fuel going into the final turn (the close following Brabham-BMW of reigning World Champion Nelson Piquet also ran out of fuel at the final turn allowing Alboreto to keep his 2nd place). Alboreto finished the 1984 season in fourth with 30.5 points, the half point coming from his sixth place at the Monaco Grand Prix which was cut to under half its original race distance due to heavy rain, resulting in half points being awarded.

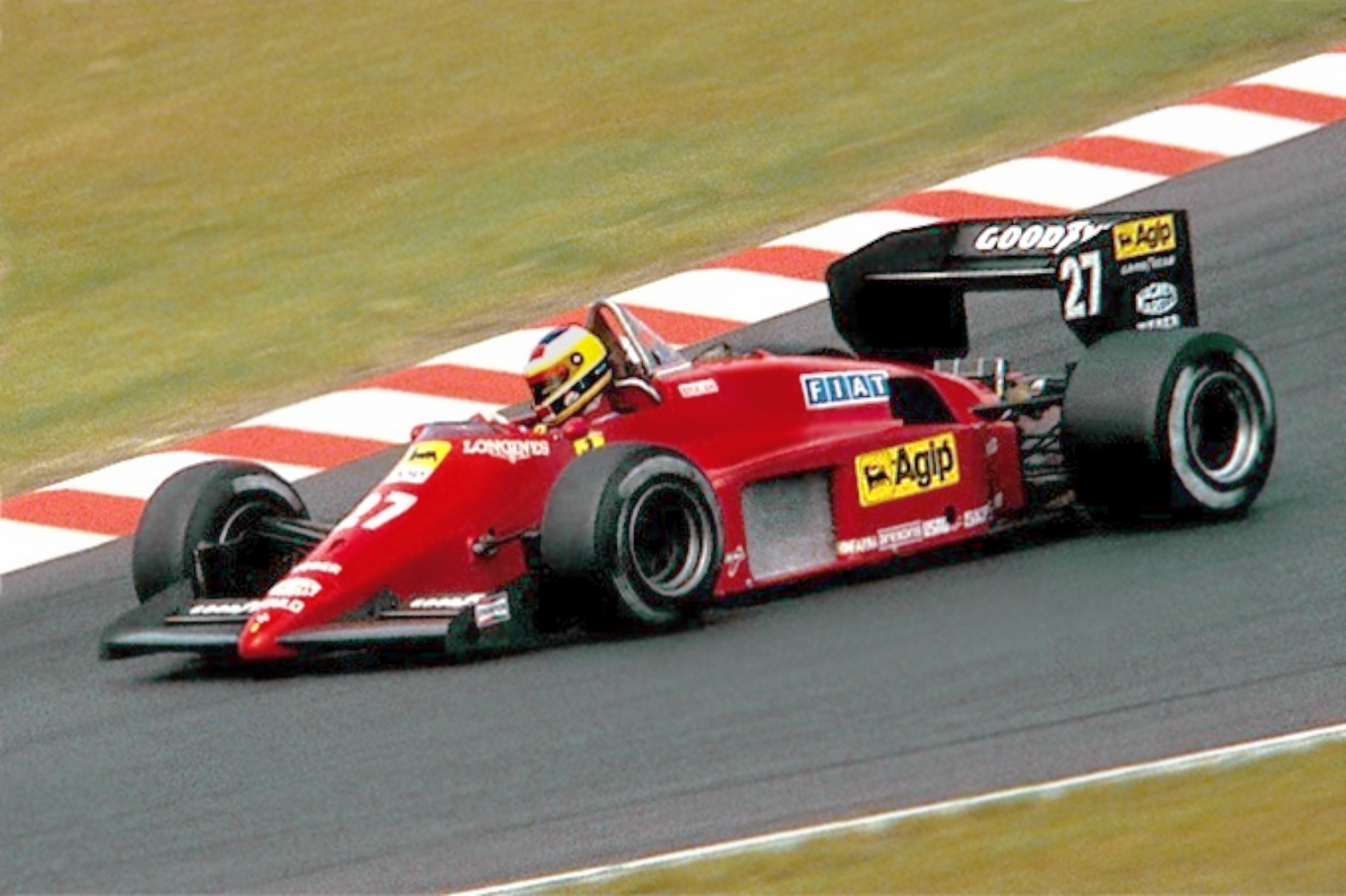
Alboreto at the 1985 German Grand Prix. The Italian took his 5th and last F1 race win, eleven seconds ahead of the World Champion-to-be Alain Prost.

"In the end he had to settle for runner-up, because the Ferrari wasn't as good a car as the McLaren – and also, truth be told, because neither was Michele as good as Alain. No disgrace in that."

— Nigel Roebuck, December 2007

1985 would prove to be Alboreto's most successful year in Formula One. He took two wins: the first a dominant win at the Canadian Grand Prix with new team mate Stefan Johansson finishing second, and the second at the German Grand Prix where he had a somewhat luckier time, twice being involved in incidents with other cars (once with Johansson at the very first corner of the race, giving his team mate a flat tyre) and with his car trailing oil smoke for much of the event, though a brake problem and a lack of power from the TAG-Porsche engine kept his main title rival Alain Prost from challenging. Alboreto led the points table until Round 11 at Zandvoort, but finished the season in second place with 53 points, 20 points behind new World Champion Prost. Formula One journalist Nigel Roebuck commented that "Alboreto was Prost's only real challenger for the World Championship". Ultimately it was Ferrari's unreliability which cost Alboreto his chance at the World Championship as he failed to finish the final five races of the season all due to mechanical failure, though he was classified 13th in Italy despite his engine blowing on lap 45 of 51. At the 1985 European Grand Prix at Brands Hatch, after stopping to replace a flat-spotted tyre on lap eleven, his Ferrari blew its turbo halfway through lap thirteen. Alboreto, frustrated that Ferrari's late-season reliability had cost him the World Championship, drove the car back to the pits with the rear of the car on fire. He drove the on-fire car into the pits and straight to his Ferrari pit. Many observers saw this as Alboreto's way of showing that the Ferrari's unreliability had cost him the World Championship, which Prost won by finishing fourth in the race.

In 1986, Ferrari's new car, the F1/86 designed by Harvey Postlethwaite, proved to be slower and less reliable than its predecessor as Alboreto retired from nine races, of which seven were mechanical failures. Alboreto only scored one podium, at the Austrian Grand Prix – even then both Williams cars of Nigel Mansell and Nelson Piquet had retired and Alboreto finished a full lap behind race winner Alain Prost. The Italian finished the season ninth in the Drivers' Championship with fourteen points. While the Ferrari V6 turbo was rated as one of the more powerful engines on the grid, both Alboreto and his teammate Stefan Johansson were hampered by the F1/86 which refused to handle on tracks which had a bumpy surface. Johansson finished 5th in the championship with 20 points despite being the #2 driver in the team, causing many to question why the team chose to re-sign Alboreto and let Johansson go.

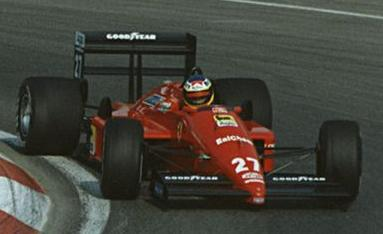
Alboreto driving for Ferrari in his last season with the team, at the 1988 Canadian Grand Prix.

Austrian Gerhard Berger joined Ferrari in 1987 which signalled the end of Alboreto's time as leader of the Ferrari team. Berger soon established himself as the team's number one driver thanks to his wins in Japan and Australia at the end of the season, while Alboreto could only manage a handful of podiums at Imola, Monaco and a second place at the final round in Australia to make it a Ferrari one-two and only then after the Lotus 99T-Honda of second on the road finisher Ayrton Senna had been disqualified post-race for having oversized brake ducts. The Italian finished the year in seventh overall with 17 points, 19 points behind his teammate.

The 1988 season would be Alboreto's final year with Ferrari. With the McLaren-Hondas of Ayrton Senna and Alain Prost dominating the season, the Ferrari team only managed a single win during the year at the Italian Grand Prix which Berger won from Alboreto in second place. Ferrari refused to offer the Italian a new contract so Alboreto looked elsewhere for a drive. This announcement came at the French Grand Prix in July and pit lane rumours had Michele re-joining Tyrrell for 1989 (in France, where Alboreto finished 3rd and Berger a distant 4th, was the only time in 1988 the Italian would finish in front of the Austrian in a race where both finished). After France he received an offer from Frank Williams, head of the Williams team who would have exclusive use of the new V10 Renault engine in 1989. Later that year before the Italian GP at Monza, Alboreto had not received any word from Williams and requested confirmation of his seat at the team. Williams replied by saying that "he wanted him" and "not to move". At Monza, however, Williams announced he had signed Belgian Thierry Boutsen instead while also confirming that the team's number 2 driver, Alboreto's former Lancia sportscar teammate Riccardo Patrese, would be staying with the team. As it was late in the season, Alboreto was left with few options for the coming season and arguably signalled the end of his time driving for one of the top teams.

Alboreto competed in eighty Grands Prix for Ferrari, which established a new record. It stood until the 1995 Argentine Grand Prix, when it was surpassed by Berger.

==== 1989: Tyrrell and Larrousse ====
A lack of a drive had left Alboreto in a difficult situation and he later said that he contemplated retirement – an option of which his family were very much in favour. However, he was offered a drive at his former employer Tyrrell, which he accepted. The relationship between Alboreto and team boss, Ken Tyrrell, soon turned sour. At the Monaco Grand Prix, Alboreto was told to drive the 1988 model Tyrrell 017, due to the newer 018 model not being completed. Teammate Jonathan Palmer was chosen to drive the new monoshock 018. Meanwhile, the Italian would have to wait until the following day for the 018 so he decided not to accept this. The result was Alboreto boycotting the Thursday practice session. Alboreto finished the race in fifth position while Palmer finished ninth. This was followed by a strong performance at the next race in Mexico, where Alboreto finished third – the only podium the team would achieve during the season.

By the French Grand Prix, Ken Tyrrell had found a new sponsor in Camel cigarettes for the season and told Alboreto that if he wanted to continue with the team he would need to end his personal sponsorship deal with Marlboro, a rival brand to Camel. Alboreto was disappointed, as thanks to his Marlboro backing, the team had managed to fund his wages. Following Alboreto's refusal to cut his ties with his sponsor, Tyrrell replaced him with the up-and-coming French Formula 3000 driver Jean Alesi. Alesi finished fourth in his first Grand Prix for the team at the French Grand Prix.

Ironically, Alboreto soon lost his Marlboro sponsorship as well after they refused to find him another drive for the rest of the 1989 season. He was, however, soon hired by the French Larrousse team, incidentally co-sponsored by Camel, for the German Grand Prix and the rest of the season. Although his new teammate Philippe Alliot showed that the Lola LC89 with its 600 bhp (447 kW; 608 PS) Lamborghini V12 engine could be a competitive car with high grid positions and challenging for points in various races, Alboreto failed to score a single point for the rest of the season, and twice he even failed to pre-qualify in Spain (where Alliot not only pre-qualified, but then qualified a season high fifth) and in the final round in Australia, while in between those two races the Italian also failed to qualify in Japan. During qualifying for the Hungarian Grand Prix, the Italian cut one of the chicanes and broke two of his ribs in the process. After competing the year for two teams, Alboreto finished the year eleventh in the Drivers' Championship with six points.

==== 1990–1992: Footwork ====
1990 saw Alboreto move to the Arrows team, which was in the process of being sold to sponsor Footwork. It was seen mainly as a "transition year" for him, as the chassis was in its second year and severe uncompetitiveness would be expected. Despite this, the 33-year-old finished in the top ten a number of times and only retired three times. Alboreto finished the season, however, as one of 21 drivers who failed to score a point.

Footwork secured Porsche works engines for 1991 and sponsorship from Japan, as the Footwork company completed its takeover of the team. The package did not, however, live up to its expectations as it failed to qualify a number of times. Soon the overweight and unreliable Porsche engines were replaced by Hart-supplied Cosworth engines for the rest of the season, the short-term fix not improving the team's competitiveness. This would be Alboreto's second season in succession that he failed to score a point.

Thanks to Footwork's Japanese connections the team received a supply of Mugen Honda V10 engines for 1992. The FA13 was reliable in comparison to its predecessor and Alboreto scored points four times, in addition to finishing in seventh place six times. With a season total of six points, the 35-year-old finished the year tenth overall.

==== 1993–1994: Scuderia Italia and Minardi ====
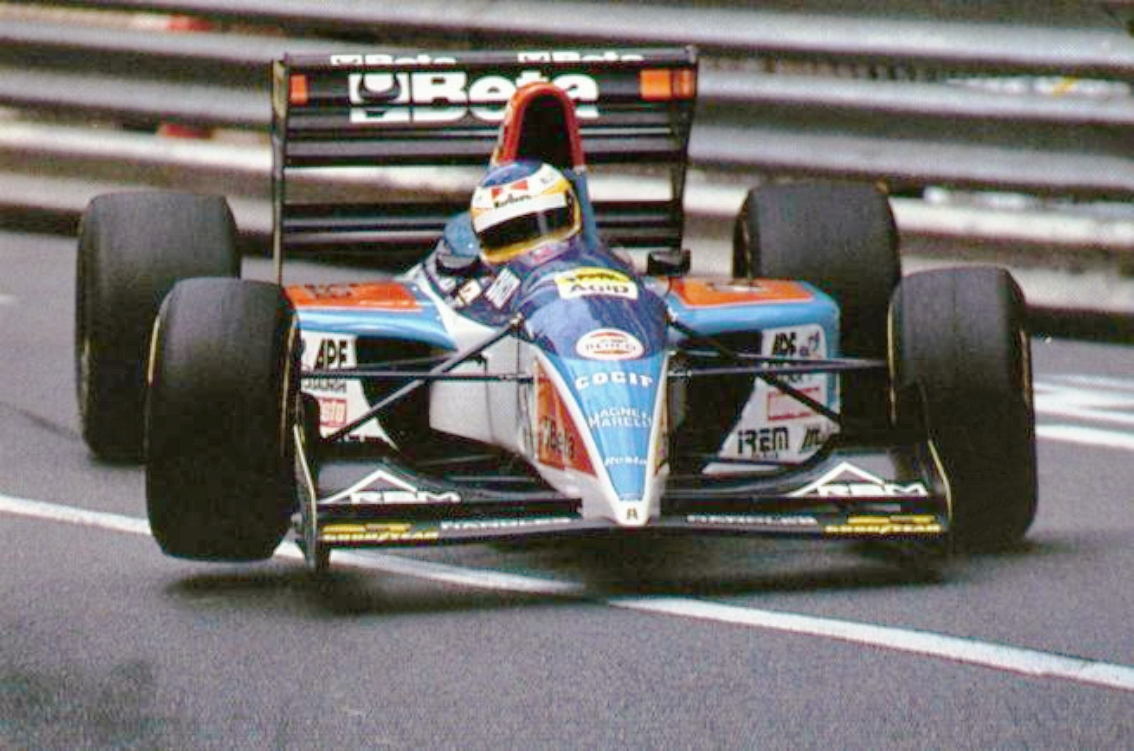
Alboreto driving for Minardi at the 1994 Monaco Grand Prix

Alboreto joined the Italian team Scuderia Italia, which had enjoyed a number of successes in its short history, most notably when Andrea de Cesaris and JJ Lehto had scored podium positions at the 1989 Canadian Grand Prix and 1991 San Marino Grand Prix respectively. At the start of 1993, however, the team moved away from its Dallara-built chassis and were instead supplied by Lola. The Italian failed to score any points over the year, and failed to qualify several times as the slowest runner in the 26-car field. Scuderia Italia withdrew before the end of the season, and merged with fellow Italian team Minardi for 1994.

The Minardi cars proved to be mostly uncompetitive and unreliable, with a total of nine retirements from sixteen rounds. A sixth position in Monaco was Alboreto's only points finish. At the 1994 San Marino Grand Prix, which was overshadowed by the deaths of Ayrton Senna and Roland Ratzenberger, whilst leaving the pitlane after a scheduled stop, Alboreto's car lost its loose right rear wheel which bounced through the Benetton, Ferrari, and Lotus pit areas and crews, injuring several mechanics. At the end of the season, he decided to retire from Grand Prix racing, with a record of 194 starts and five Grand Prix wins.

=== 1994–2001: Post-Formula One career ===
Following his departure from Formula One in 1995, Alboreto embarked on a career in the German Touring Car Championship, known as the Deutsche Tourenwagen Meisterschaft. Racing for Alfa Romeo's factory team, Alfa Corse, the Italian finished 22nd in the championship, scoring four points. Further entries in the International Touring Car Championship and World Sportscar Championship, the latter being with Ferrari, also proved to be fruitless ventures.

Alboreto returned to open-wheel racing in 1996, entering the newly formed Indy Racing League (IRL) with Scandia/Simon Racing. The then 39-year-old competed in all three rounds where he finished fourth on his debut at Walt Disney World Speedway; eighth at the Phoenix International Raceway; and retired, due to gearbox problems, at the 1996 Indianapolis 500, his sole entry into the race. Alboreto also ran sports prototypes for Scandia/Simon while in the United States, entering the IMSA World Sports Car Championship with a Ferrari 333 SP. He also entered the Le Mans 24 Hours in a Joest Racing-entered Porsche WSC-95 alongside fellow Italian and former F1 teammate Pierluigi Martini and Belgian Didier Theys, but retired due to an engine failure after completing 300 laps. The following year, Alboreto earned his first and only podium in the IRL at the "True Value 200" held in New Hampshire, where he finished third. A further fifth place at Las Vegas earned Alboreto 62 points during his 1997 campaign which resulted in a 32nd place overall in the drivers' championship.

Also in 1997, Alboreto was called to testify at the trial following Ayrton Senna's fatal accident in 1994. He told the tribunal that, in his opinion, Senna's accident was likely caused by a technical failure rather than a driver error.

Alboreto won the 1997 24 Hours of Le Mans with the same car as the previous year, but this time alongside Swede Stefan Johansson, another former F1 teammate, and Dane Tom Kristensen, who would later go onto beat Jacky Ickx's record for winning the most Le Mans 24 Hour races. The trio completed 361 laps, one more than second-placed Gulf Team Davidoff's BMW-powered McLaren F1 GTR. This would prove to be the peak of Alboreto's sportscar tenure as he failed to finish at Le Mans in 1998 with Porsche once again. However, he did find consistent success over the next few years. Notably, fourth place at the 1999 24 Hours of Le Mans with the newcomer Audi, third at the 2000 Le Mans 24 Hours, a victory at the 2000 Petit Le Mans and a win at the 2001 Sebring 12 Hours, which would prove to be the Italian's final race prior to his death a month later.

== Death ==
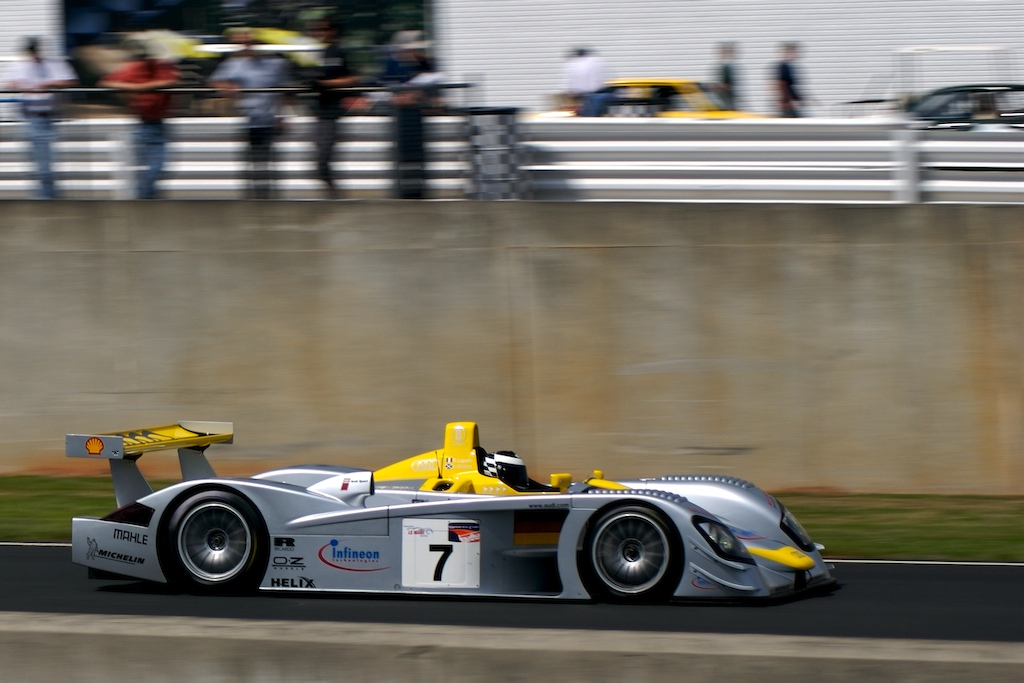
An Audi R8 as it appeared in 2001 when Alboreto was testing at the EuroSpeedway Lausitz.

In late April 2001, Alboreto and a small group of Audi engineers travelled to the EuroSpeedway Lausitz near Dresden in eastern Germany to perform a series of tests on an Audi R8 in preparation for their participation at the 24 Hours of Le Mans in June. Alboreto mainly drove the car in the area of the facility that is used for public racing events, using the tri-oval for quicker laps and the Grand Prix circuit for slower laps, but some testing also took place within the limits of the adjacent proving ground, which features an elongated oval track with two long straights.

Around 5.30 p.m. local time on 25 April 2001, Alboreto accelerated the R8 along one of the two long straights at the proving ground. When the car reached the speed of approximately 300 km/h (190 mph), its left rear tyre failed. The R8 was subsequently launched into the air, somersaulting over the Armco barrier and landing inverted. The car's landing caused Alboreto's head to strike the ground, killing him instantly. Initially, Audi gave no reason for the crash, stating the R8 had "already completed thousands of test kilometres on numerous circuits without any problems." Five days later, the conclusions of an investigation into the accident were reported. The tyre failure was attributed to a gradual loss of air pressure, caused by a loose screw that had found its way into the tyre. As there was no indication of a mechanical problem or driver error, the tyre failure was determined to be the sole cause of the crash. The finding motivated Audi to expedite the implementation of a new sensor-based TPMS in their racecars.

Alboreto's death brought much anguish among his family and friends who had longed for him to give up racing due to its dangerous nature. Michele's cousin Marisa told Italian news agency ANSA, "You can't imagine what we're going through as a family. We're really distraught."

=== Legacy ===
Fellow Italian Giancarlo Fisichella dedicated his podium finish at the 2005 Italian Grand Prix to Alboreto, "I know Alboreto was the last Italian on the podium at Monza before me. I was lucky enough to race together with him in touring cars, and he was a great person, really special. I want to dedicate the result to his memory."

On 28 August 2021, it was announced that the final corner at the Monza Circuit, the Curva Parabolica, would be officially renamed the Curva Alboreto during the 2021 Italian Grand Prix weekend to mark the 20th anniversary of Alboreto's death.

== Helmet ==
Alboreto's helmet was blue with a yellow stripe with white edges covering the centre of the helmet. The colours were a tribute to Swedish driver Ronnie Peterson, whose helmet design also used them to reflect the Swedish flag. Alboreto and Peterson first met in 1972 and were friends until the Swedish driver's death in 1978.

== Racing career results ==
=== Career summary ===
Season	Series	Team	Races	Wins	Poles	F/Laps	Podiums	Points	Position
1979	European Formula Three	Euroracing	6	0	2	1	2	19	6th
1979	Italian Formula Three	Euroracing	?	3	?	?	?	47	**2nd**
1980	European Formula Three	Euroracing	14	4	3	1	8	60	**1st**
1980	World Sportscar Championship	Lancia Corse	4	1	?	?	3	N/A	NC
1980	Italian Formula Three	Euroracing	2	0	1	0	2	25	**3rd**
1980	German Formula Three	Euroracing	2	1	1	0	2	0	NC
1980	Vandervell British Formula Three	Euroracing	?	?	?	?	?	4	13th
1981	Formula One	Tyrrell Racing Team	10	0	0	0	0	0	NC
1981	European Formula Two	Minardi	10	1	1	1	2	13	8th
1981	World Sportscar Championship	Martini Racing	4	1	0	1	1	37	52nd
1982	Formula One	Team Tyrrell	16	1	0	1	2	25	8th
1982	World Sportscar Championship	Martini Racing	8	3	1	1	3	63	5th
1983	Formula One	Benetton Tyrrell Team	15	1	0	0	1	10	12th
1983	World Sportscar Championship	Martini Racing	5	0	0	0	0	2	85th
1983	European Endurance Championship	Martini Racing	1	0	0	0	0	12	28th
1984	Formula One	Ferrari	16	1	1	1	4	30.5	4th
1985	Formula One	Ferrari	16	2	1	2	8	53	**2nd**
1986	Formula One	Ferrari	16	0	0	0	1	14	9th
1987	Formula One	Ferrari	16	0	0	0	3	17	7th
1988	Formula One	Ferrari	16	0	0	1	3	24	5th
1989	Formula One	Tyrrell Racing Organisation	5	0	0	0	1	6	13th
1989	Formula One	Team Larrousse	5	0	0	0	0	6	13th
1990	Formula One	Footwork Arrows Racing	13	0	0	0	0	0	NC
1991	Formula One	Footwork Porsche Footwork Ford	9	0	0	0	0	0	NC
1992	Formula One	Footwork Mugen-Honda	16	0	0	0	0	6	10th
1993	Formula One	Lola BMS Scuderia Italia	9	0	0	0	0	0	NC
1994	Formula One	Minardi Scuderia Italia	16	0	0	0	0	1	25th
1995	Deutsche Tourenwagen Meisterschaft	Schübel Engineering	13	0	0	0	0	4	22nd
1995	International Touring Car Championship	Schübel Engineering	7	0	0	0	0	0	28th
1995	IMSA GT Championship	Euromotorsport Racing	3	0	2	0	1	49	27th
1996	Indy Racing League	Scandia Racing	3	0	0	0	0	189	11th
1996	IMSA GT Championship	Scandia Racing	2	0	0	1	1	0	NC
1996	24 Hours of Le Mans	Joest Racing	1	0	0	0	0	N/A	DNF
1996–97	Indy Racing League	Scandia Racing	2	0	0	0	1	62	32nd
1997	24 Hours of Le Mans	Joest Racing	1	1	1	0	1	N/A	**1st**
1998	24 Hours of Le Mans	Porsche AG / Joest Racing	1	0	0	0	0	N/A	DNF
1999	American Le Mans Series	Audi Sport Team Joest	1	0	0	0	1	24	43rd
1999	24 Hours of Le Mans	Audi Sport Team Joest	1	0	0	0	1	N/A	4th
2000	American Le Mans Series	Audi Sport North America	3	1	0	0	2	44	27th
2000	24 Hours of Le Mans	Audi Sport Team Joest	1	0	0	0	1	N/A	**3rd**
2001	American Le Mans Series	Audi Sport North America	1	1	0	0	1	31	22nd
2001	European Le Mans Series	Audi Sport North America	1	1	0	0	1	N/A	NC

=== Complete World Sportscar Championship results ===
(key) (Races in bold indicate pole position) (Races in italics indicate fastest lap)

Year	Entrant	Class	Chassis	Engine	1	2	3	4	5	6	7	8	9	10	11	12	13	14	15	Pos.	Pts
1980	Lancia Corse	Gr.5	Lancia Beta Monte Carlo	Lancia 1.4 L4t	DAY	BRH; 2	MUG; 2	MNZ	SIL; 4	NÜR	LMS	GLN; 2	MOS	VAL	DIJ					(Note: No drivers' Championship.)	
1981	Martini Racing	Gr.5	Lancia Beta Monte Carlo	Lancia 1.4 L4t	DAY; Ret	SEB	MUG; DSQ	MNZ	RSD	SIL	NÜR	LMS; 8	PER	DAY	GLN; 1	SPA	MOS	ROA	BRH	52nd	37
1982	Martini Racing	Gr.6	Lancia LC1	Lancia 1.4 L4t	MNZ; Ret	SIL; 1	NÜR; 1	LMS; Ret	SPA; Ret	MUG; 1	**FUJ**; Ret	BRH; Ret								5th	63
1983	Martini Racing	C	Lancia LC2	Ferrari 268C 2.6 V8t	MNZ; 9	SIL; Ret	NÜR; Ret	LMS; Ret	SPA; 11	FUJ	KYA									86th	2

Footnotes

=== Complete 24 Hours of Le Mans results ===
Year	Team	Co-Drivers	Car	Class	Laps	Pos.	Class Pos.
1981	(Italy) Martini Racing	(United States) Eddie Cheever (Italy) Carlo Facetti	Lancia Beta Monte Carlo	Gr. 5	322	8th	**2nd**
1982	(Italy) Martini Racing	(Italy) Teo Fabi (Germany) Rolf Stommelen	Lancia LC1	Gr. 6	92	DNF	DNF
1983	(Italy) Martini Lancia	(Italy) Piercarlo Ghinzani (Germany) Hans Heyer	Lancia LC2	C	121	DNF	DNF
1996	(Germany) Joest Racing	(Italy) Pierluigi Martini (Belgium) Didier Theys	TWR Porsche WSC-95	LMP1	300	DNF	DNF
1997	(Germany) Joest Racing	(Sweden) Stefan Johansson (Denmark) Tom Kristensen	TWR Porsche WSC-95	LMP	361	**1st**	**1st**
1998	(Germany) Porsche AG (Germany) Joest Racing	(Sweden) Stefan Johansson (France) Yannick Dalmas	Porsche LMP1-98	LMP1	107	DNF	DNF
1999	(Germany) Audi Sport Team Joest	(Italy) Rinaldo Capello (France) Laurent Aïello	Audi R8R	LMP	346	4th	**3rd**
2000	(Germany) Audi Sport Team Joest	(Germany) Christian Abt (Italy) Rinaldo Capello	Audi R8	LMP900	365	**3rd**	**3rd**

=== Complete European Formula Two Championship results ===
(key) (Races in bold indicate pole position; races in italics indicate fastest lap)

Year	Entrant	Chassis	Engine	1	2	3	4	5	6	7	8	9	10	11	12	Pos.	Pts
1981	Minardi Team	Minardi Fly 281	BMW	SIL; 11	HOC; 8	THR; Ret	NÜR; 8	VAL; Ret	MUG; 14	**PAU**; Ret	PER; 3	SPA; 8	DON	MIS; 1	MAN	8th	13

=== Complete Formula One World Championship results ===
(key) (Races in bold indicate pole position; races in italics indicate fastest lap)

Year	Entrant	Chassis	Engine	1	2	3	4	5	6	7	8	9	10	11	12	13	14	15	16	WDC	Pts
1981	Tyrrell Racing Team	Tyrrell 010	Ford Cosworth DFV 3.0 V8	USW	BRA	ARG	SMR; Ret	BEL; 12	MON; Ret	ESP; DNQ	FRA; 16	GBR; Ret	GER; DNQ	AUT; Ret						NC	0
1981	Tyrrell Racing Team	Tyrrell 011	Ford Cosworth DFV 3.0 V8												NED; 9^{†}	ITA; Ret	CAN; 11	CPL; 13^{†}		NC	0
1982	Team Tyrrell	Tyrrell 011	Ford Cosworth DFV 3.0 V8	RSA; 7	BRA; 4	USW; 4	SMR; 3	BEL; Ret	MON; 10	DET; Ret	CAN; Ret	NED; 7	GBR; NC	FRA; 6	GER; 4	AUT; Ret	SUI; 7	ITA; 5	CPL; 1	8th	25
1983	Benetton Tyrrell Team	Tyrrell 011	Ford Cosworth DFV 3.0 V8	BRA; Ret	USW; 9	FRA; 8	SMR; Ret													12th	10
1983	Benetton Tyrrell Team	Tyrrell 011	Ford Cosworth DFY 3.0 V8					MON; Ret	BEL; 14	DET; 1	CAN; 8	GBR; 13	GER; Ret	AUT; Ret						12th	10
1983	Benetton Tyrrell Team	Tyrrell 012	Ford Cosworth DFY 3.0 V8												NED; 6	ITA; Ret	EUR; Ret	RSA; Ret		12th	10
1984	Ferrari	Ferrari 126C4	Ferrari 031 1.5 V6t	BRA; Ret	RSA; 11^{†}	**BEL**; 1	SMR; Ret	FRA; Ret	MON; 6^{‡}	CAN; Ret	DET; Ret	DAL; Ret	GBR; 5	GER; Ret	AUT; 3	NED; Ret	ITA; 2	EUR; 2	POR; 4	4th	30.5
1985	Ferrari	Ferrari 156/85	Ferrari 031 1.5 V6t	**BRA**; 2	POR; 2	SMR; Ret	MON; 2	CAN; 1	DET; 3	FRA; Ret	GBR; 2	GER; 1	AUT; 3	NED; 4	ITA; 13^{†}	BEL; Ret	EUR; Ret	RSA; Ret	AUS; Ret	**2nd**	**53**
1986	Ferrari	Ferrari F1/86	Ferrari 032 1.5 V6t	BRA; Ret	ESP; Ret	SMR; 10^{†}	MON; Ret	BEL; 4	CAN; 8	DET; 4	FRA; 8	GBR; Ret	GER; Ret	HUN; Ret	AUT; 2	ITA; Ret	POR; 5	MEX; Ret	AUS; Ret	9th	14
1987	Ferrari	Ferrari F1/87	Ferrari 033D 1.5 V6t	BRA; 8^{†}	SMR; 3	BEL; Ret	MON; 3	DET; Ret	FRA; Ret	GBR; Ret	GER; Ret	HUN; Ret	AUT; Ret	ITA; Ret	POR; Ret	ESP; 15^{†}	MEX; Ret	JPN; 4	AUS; 2	7th	17
1988	Ferrari	Ferrari F1/87/88C	Ferrari 033E 1.5 V6t	BRA; 5	SMR; 18^{†}	MON; 3	MEX; 4	CAN; Ret	DET; Ret	FRA; 3	GBR; 17^{†}	GER; 4	HUN; Ret	BEL; Ret	ITA; 2	POR; 5	ESP; Ret	JPN; 11	AUS; Ret	5th	24
1989	Tyrrell Racing Organisation	Tyrrell 017B	Ford Cosworth DFR 3.5 V8	BRA; 10																13th	6
1989	Tyrrell Racing Organisation	Tyrrell 018	Ford Cosworth DFR 3.5 V8		SMR; DNQ	MON; 5	MEX; 3	USA; Ret	CAN; Ret	FRA	GBR									13th	6
1989	Team Larrousse	Lola LC89	Lamborghini 3512 3.5 V12									GER; Ret	HUN; Ret	BEL; Ret	ITA; Ret	POR; 11	ESP; DNPQ	JPN; DNQ	AUS; DNPQ	13th	6
1990	Footwork Arrows Racing	Arrows A11B	Ford Cosworth DFR 3.5 V8	USA; 10	BRA; Ret	SMR; DNQ	MON; DNQ	CAN; Ret	MEX; 17	FRA; 10	GBR; Ret	GER; Ret	HUN; 12	BEL; 13	ITA; 12^{†}	POR; 9	ESP; 10	JPN; Ret	AUS; DNQ	NC	0
1991	Footwork Porsche	Footwork A11C	Porsche 3512 3.5 V12	USA; Ret	BRA; DNQ	SMR; DNQ														NC	0
1991	Footwork Porsche	Footwork FA12	Porsche 3512 3.5 V12				MON; Ret	CAN; Ret	MEX; Ret											NC	0
1991	Footwork Ford	Footwork FA12C	Ford Cosworth DFR 3.5 V8							FRA; Ret	GBR; Ret	GER; DNQ	HUN; DNQ	BEL; DNPQ	ITA; DNQ	POR; 15	ESP; Ret	JPN; DNQ	AUS; 13	NC	0
1992	Footwork Mugen-Honda	Footwork FA13	Mugen-Honda MF-351H 3.5 V10	RSA; 10	MEX; 13	BRA; 6	ESP; 5	SMR; 5	MON; 7	CAN; 7	FRA; 7	GBR; 7	GER; 9	HUN; 7	BEL; Ret	ITA; 7	POR; 6	JPN; 15	AUS; Ret	10th	6
1993	Lola BMS Scuderia Italia	Lola T93/30	Ferrari 040 3.5 V12	RSA; Ret	BRA; 11	EUR; 11	SMR; DNQ	ESP; DNQ	MON; Ret	CAN; DNQ	FRA; DNQ	GBR; DNQ	GER; 16	HUN; Ret	BEL; 14	ITA; Ret	POR; Ret	JPN	AUS	NC	0
1994	Minardi Scuderia Italia	Minardi M193B	Ford HBC7/8 3.5 V8	BRA; Ret	PAC; Ret	SMR; Ret	MON; 6	ESP; Ret												25th	1
1994	Minardi Scuderia Italia	Minardi M194	Ford HBC7/8 3.5 V8						CAN; 11	FRA; Ret	GBR; Ret	GER; Ret	HUN; 7	BEL; 9	ITA; Ret	POR; 13	EUR; 14	JPN; Ret	AUS; Ret	25th	1

^{†} Did not finish, but was classified as he had completed more than 90% of the race distance.
^{‡} Race was stopped with less than 75% of laps completed, half points awarded.

=== Complete Deutsche Tourenwagen Meisterschaft results ===
(key) (Races in bold indicate pole position) (Races in italics indicate fastest lap)

Year	Team	Car	1	2	3	4	5	6	7	8	9	10	11	12	13	14	Pos.	Pts
1995	Schübel Engineering	Alfa Romeo 155 V6 Ti	HOC; 1; 15	HOC; 2; 7	AVU; 1; 12	AVU; 2; 8	NOR; 1; 14	NOR; 2 Ret	DIE; 1; 11	DIE; 2; 11	NÜR; 1; 13	NÜR; 2 Ret	ALE; 1 Ret	ALE; 2 DNS	HOC; 1; 16	HOC; 2; 15	22nd	4

=== Complete International Touring Car Championship results ===
(key) (Races in bold indicate pole position) (Races in italics indicate fastest lap)

Year	Team	Car	1	2	3	4	5	6	7	8	9	10	Pos.	Pts
1995	Schübel Engineering	Alfa Romeo 155 V6 Ti	MUG; 1 Ret	MUG; 2 DNS	HEL; 1 Ret	HEL; 2 Ret	DON; 1 Ret	DON; 2; 17	EST; 1 Ret	EST; 2 DNS	MAG; 1 DNS	MAG; 2 Ret	28th	0

=== American open-wheel racing results ===
(key) (Races in bold indicate pole position)

==== Indy Racing League ====
Year	Team	Chassis	No.	Engine	1	2	3	4	5	6	7	8	9	10	Pos.	Pts	Ref
1996	Team Scandia	Lola T95/00	33	Ford XB V8t	WDW; 4	PHX; 8									**11th**	**189**	
1996	Team Scandia	Reynard 95i	33	Ford XB V8t			INDY; 30								**11th**	**189**	
1996–97	Team Scandia	Reynard 95i	33	Ford XB V8t	NHA; 3	LVS; 5	WDW	PHX	INDY	TXS	PPR	CLT	NHA	LVS	**32nd**	**62**	

Years	Teams	Races	Poles	Wins	Podiums (non-win)	Top 10s (non-podium)	Indianapolis 500 wins	Championships
2	1	5	0	0	1	3	0	0

==== Indianapolis 500 ====
Year	Chassis	Engine	Start	Finish	Team
1996	Reynard	Ford-Cosworth	12	30	Scandia

=== Complete American Le Mans Series results ===
(key) (Races in bold indicate pole position) (Races in italics indicate fastest lap)

Year	Entrant	Class	Chassis	Engine	1	2	3	4	5	6	7	8	9	10	11	12	Rank	Points	Ref
1999	Audi Sport Team Joest	LMP	Audi R8R	Audi 3.6 V8t	SEB; 3	ATL	MOS	SON	POR	PET	LAG	LVS					43rd	24	
2000	Audi Sport North America	LMP	Audi R8	Audi 3.6 V8t	SEB; 2								PET; 1	LAG	LVS	ADE	27th	44	
2000	Audi Sport North America	LMP	Audi R8R	Audi 3.6 V8t		CLT; 8	SIL	NÜR	SON	MOS	TEX	POR					27th	44	
2001	Audi Sport North America	LMP900	Audi R8	Audi 3.6 V8t	TEX	SEB; 1	DON	JAR	SON	POR	MOS	MOH	LAG	PET			22nd	31	

Sporting positions
Preceded by Alain Prost	European Formula 3 Championship; Champion; 1980	Succeeded by Mauro Baldi
Preceded by Hans-Joachim Stuck; Nelson Piquet	Winner of the 1000 km Nürburgring; 1982; With: Teo Fabi & Riccardo Patrese	Succeeded by Jochen Mass; Jacky Ickx
Preceded by Manuel Reuter; Davy Jones; Alexander Wurz	Winner of the 24 Hours of Le Mans; 1997; With: Stefan Johansson & Tom Kristensen	Succeeded by Laurent Aïello; Allan McNish; Stéphane Ortelli
Preceded by Frank Biela; Tom Kristensen; Emanuele Pirro	Winner of the 12 Hours of Sebring; 2001; With: Laurent Aïello & Rinaldo Capello	Succeeded by Rinaldo Capello; Christian Pescatori; Johnny Herbert
