= Tyrrell 019 =

Formula One racing car

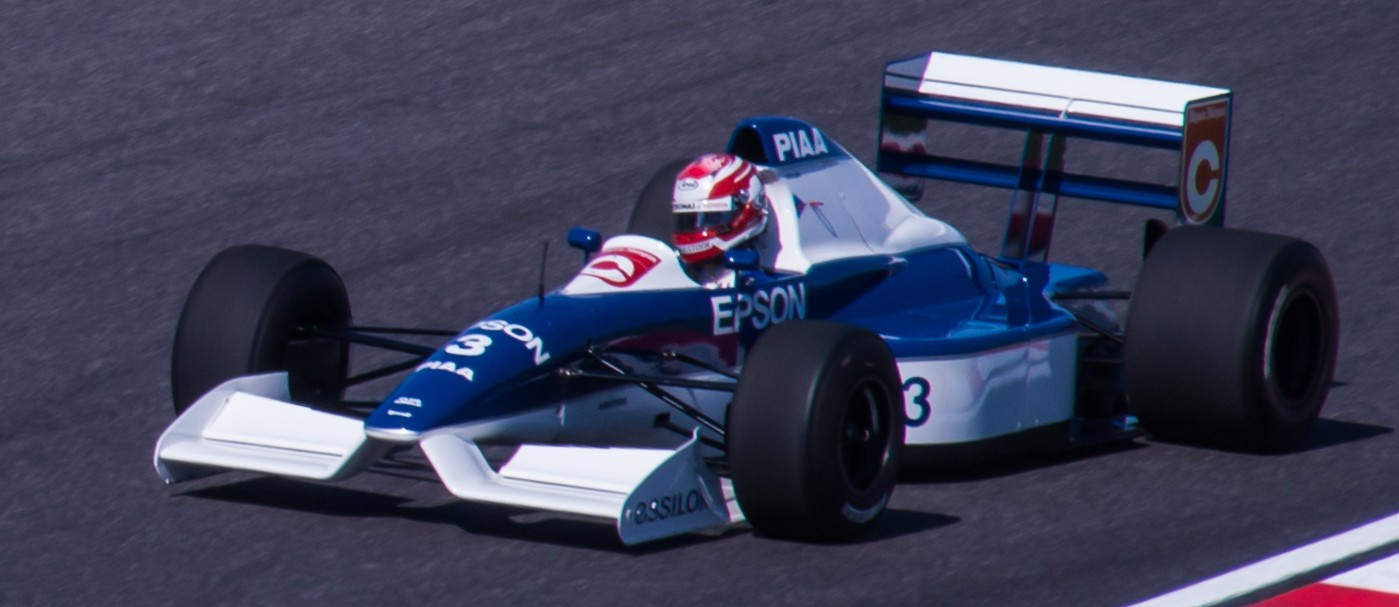
- Kazuki Nakajima driving his father's 019 during the 2013 Japanese Grand Prix
- Category: Formula One
- Constructor: Tyrrell Racing Organisation
- Designers: Harvey Postlethwaite (Technical Director); Jean-Claude Migeot (Chief Designer)
- Predecessor: Tyrrell 018
- Successor: Tyrrell 020

Technical specifications
- Chassis: Carbon fibre monocoque
- Suspension (front): Double wishbone, push-rod actuated coil springs over dampers
- Suspension (rear): Double wishbone, push-rod actuated coil springs over dampers
- Engine: Ford DFR, 3,493 cc (213.2 cu in), 90° V8, NA, mid-engine, longitudinally mounted
- Transmission: Tyrrell / Hewland 6-speed manual
- Fuel: Elf
- Tyres: Pirelli

Competition history
- Notable entrants: Tyrrell Racing Organisation
- Notable drivers: 3. (Japan) Satoru Nakajima; 4. (France) Jean Alesi
- Debut: 1990 San Marino Grand Prix
- Last event: 1990 Australian Grand Prix
Races	Wins	Poles	F/Laps
14	0	0	0

The Tyrrell 019 was a 1990 Formula One racing car, designed by a team led by Harvey Postlethwaite, and built by Tyrrell. It was an evolution of Postlethwaite's first design for Tyrrell, the Tyrrell 018.

The car was introduced two races into the 1990 Formula One season, scoring a point on its debut in the hands of Jean Alesi. The car was powered by the Ford DFR V8 engine - a descendant of the Cosworth DFV.

== Design ==
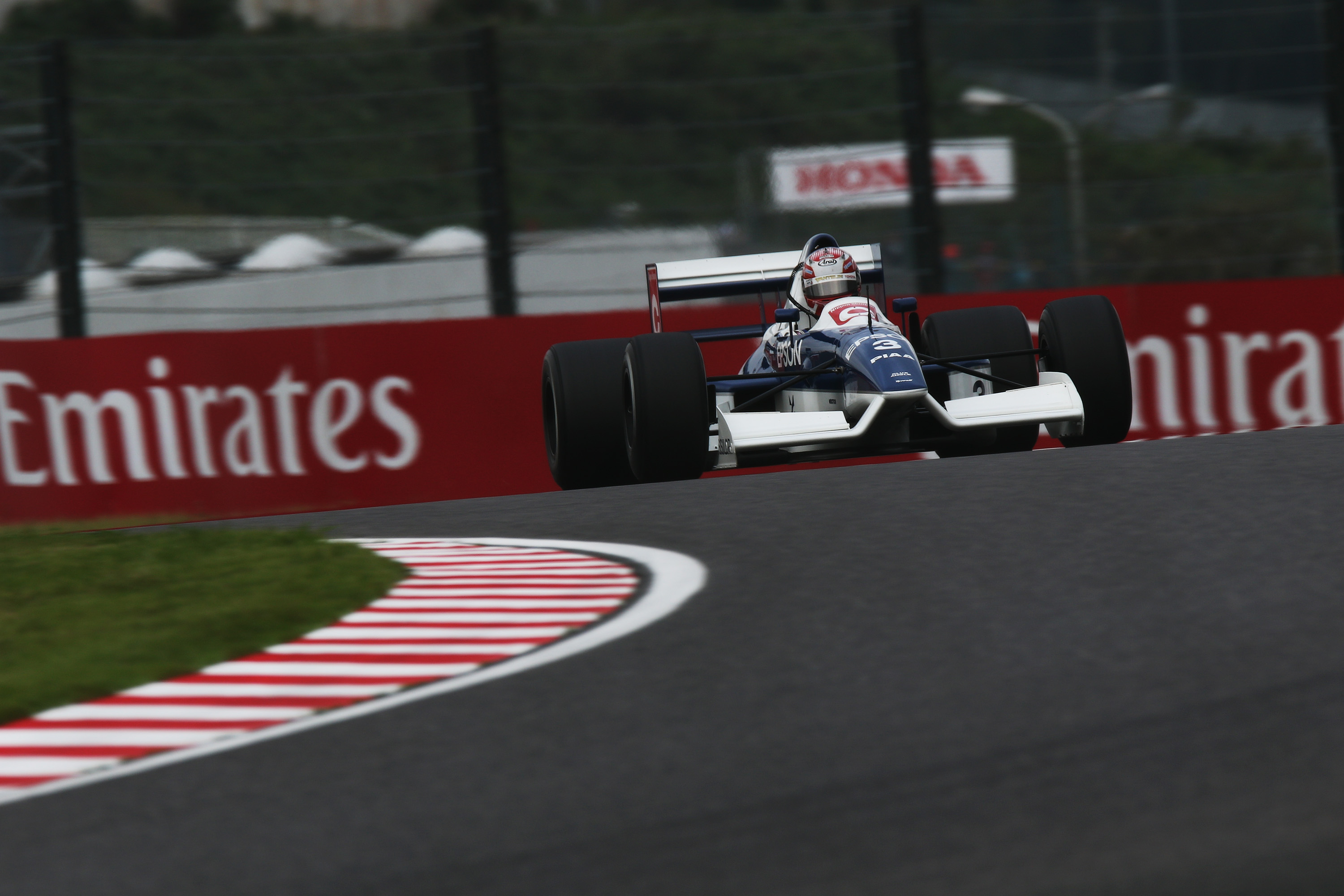
Kazuki Nakajima demonstrates his father's 019 at the 2018 Japanese Grand Prix.

Although the 018 had a modestly successful season in 1989, Harvey Postlethwaite did not rest on his laurels. Postlethwaite was an experienced F1 engineer, having previously built race-winning cars for Hesketh, Wolf and Ferrari, and so was well placed to spot the shortcomings of his own design. Taking the 018 as their base, Postlethwaite and Tyrrell Chief Designer Jean-Claude Migeot decided to try to improve the aerodynamic efficiency of the chassis. One area in particular attracted their attention: the underbody airflow. While true ground effect designs had been outlawed during the 1980s, the contemporary practice of coupling a flat, chassis undertray with a large rear diffuser meant that many cars still produced a significant proportion of their downforce through the generation of a low-pressure air mass underneath the car. What Postlethwaite and Migeot realised was that the efficiency of this low-pressure generating system was being seriously compromised by the low nose position at the front end of the car. These low nose cones effectively diverted air sideways and upwards around the cars' upper bodywork, and reduced the volume of air passing underneath the car. However, the generation of low pressures relies on increasing the speed of the air passing underneath the flat bottom of the car, in relation to that passing over and around it. In simple terms, the more air that can be drawn underneath a car, the faster that air will have to be moving, and the faster the air is moving, the lower the pressure. By raising the nose cone of the car, Postlethwaite and his team increased the volume of air that was able to pass underneath the car. Conversely, the efficiency of the front wing aerofoils are increased the closer they are to the ground. These conflicting requirements led to the design of the 019's distinctive inverted-V, anhedral front profile.

The car used the 3.5 litre Cosworth DFR V8 engine which developed approximately 620 bhp (462 kW; 629 PS). The engines were tuned for Tyrrell by Hart Racing Engines.

== Competition history ==
In practice the car did not have the same impact in terms of results as it had in technological advancement. Although Alesi qualified a strong seventh and took a point for a sixth-place finish at its first race in San Marino, and then both qualified and finished in second place in Monaco, the remainder of the season resulted in only two points finishes. Nevertheless, as other teams experimented with the principle it rapidly became the norm for Formula One cars to sport a high nose cone. The last truly successful low nose design was the Williams FW16, built only four years after the Tyrrell's unveiling. After this car, all Formula One Championship winning chassis have followed Tyrrell's lead.

The Tyrrell 019 was replaced at the end of the 1990 season by the Tyrrell 020, a further evolution of Postlethwaite's high nose principle.

== Legacy ==
The car won the Autosport Racing Car of the Year Award for 1990.

The car marked the significant point in the evolution of Formula One design in having an elevated nose cone. This was the first time that such an idea had been tried in Formula One racing, and set the template for aerodynamic design ever since. This type of nose cone was gradually adopted by other teams and became the de rigueur design by 1996.

== Complete Formula One World Championship results ==
(key)

Year	Entrant	Engine	Tyres	Drivers	1	2	3	4	5	6	7	8	9	10	11	12	13	14	15	16	Pts.	WCC
1990	Tyrrell Racing Organisation	Ford DFR; V8	P		USA	BRA	SMR	MON	CAN	MEX	FRA	GBR	GER	HUN	BEL	ITA	POR	ESP	JPN	AUS	16^{†}	5th
1990	Tyrrell Racing Organisation	Ford DFR; V8	P	Satoru Nakajima			Ret	Ret	11	Ret	Ret	Ret	Ret	Ret	Ret	6	DNS	Ret	6	Ret	16^{†}	5th
1990	Tyrrell Racing Organisation	Ford DFR; V8	P	Jean Alesi			6	2	Ret	7	Ret	8	11	Ret	8	Ret	8	Ret	DNS	8	16^{†}	5th

^{†} Seven points scored with the Tyrrell 018.

== Notes ==
Awards
Preceded by Sauber C9	Autosport; Racing Car Of The Year; 1990	Succeeded by Jordan 191
