= Tyrrell 017 =

Formula One racing car

Tyrrell 017 Tyrrell 017B
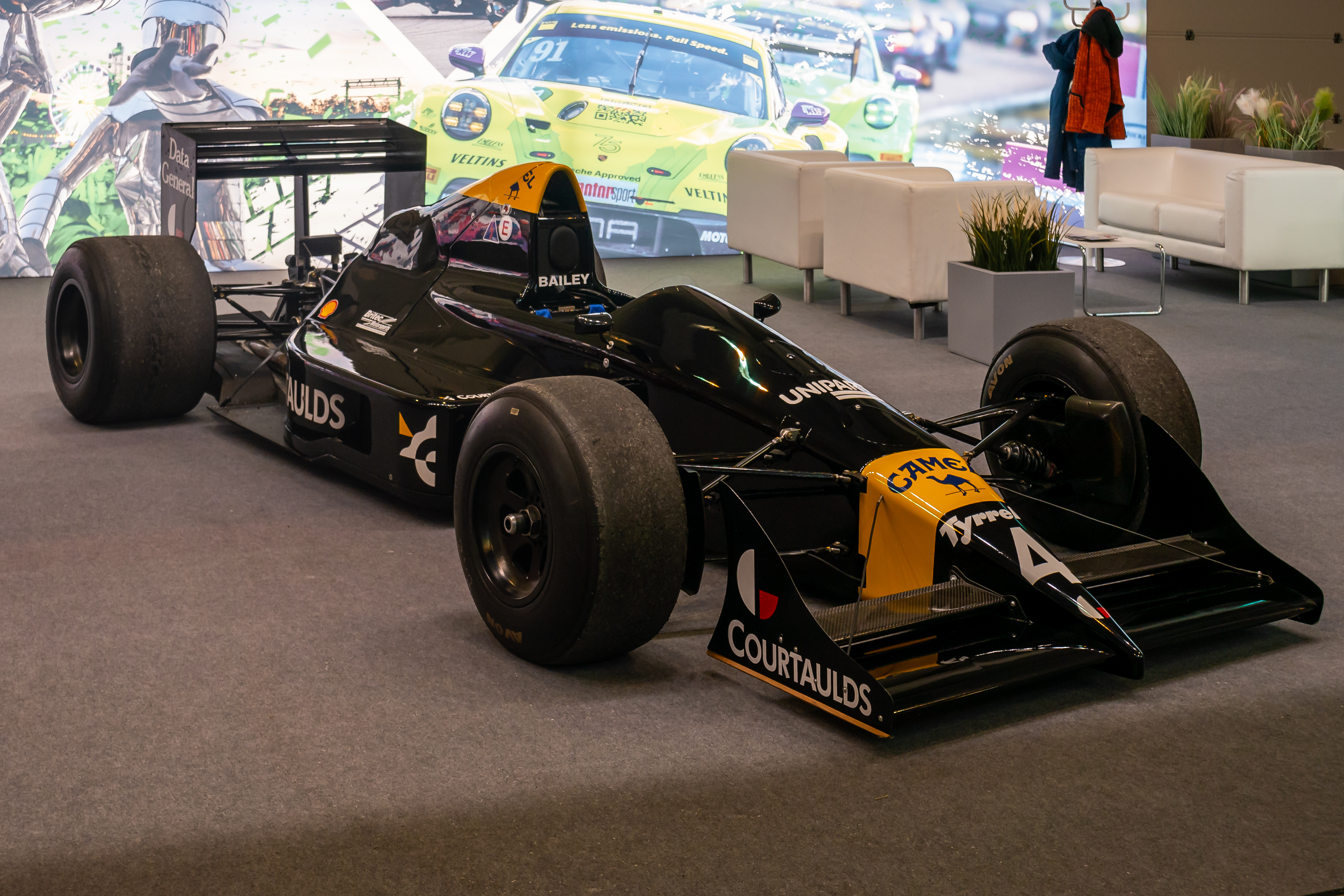
- The Tyrrell 017 in 1988 driven by Julian Bailey
- Category: Formula One
- Constructor: Tyrrell
- Designers: Maurice Philippe (Technical Director); Brian Lisles (Chief Designer); Graham Heard (Chief Engineer)
- Predecessor: Tyrrell DG016
- Successor: Tyrrell 018

Technical specifications
- Chassis: Aluminium and Carbon fibre monocoque
- Suspension (front): Double wishbones, pushrods
- Suspension (rear): Double wishbones, pushrods
- Engine: 1988: mid-engine, longitudinally mounted, 3,494 cc (213.2 cu in), Cosworth DFZ, 90° V8, NA; 1989: mid-engine, longitudinally mounted, 3,493 cc (213.2 cu in), Cosworth DFR, 90° V8, NA
- Transmission: Tyrrell 5/6-speed manual
- Fuel: Elf
- Tyres: Goodyear

Competition history
- Notable entrants: Tyrrell Racing Organisation
- Notable drivers: 3. (United Kingdom) Jonathan Palmer; 4. (United Kingdom) Julian Bailey; 4. (Italy) Michele Alboreto
- Debut: 1988 Brazilian Grand Prix
- Last event: 1989 Brazilian Grand Prix
Races	Wins	Poles	F/Laps
17	0	0	0
- Constructors' Championships: 0
- Drivers' Championships: 0

The Tyrrell 017 was a Formula One racing car designed by Maurice Philippe and Brian Lisles. It was built and raced by Tyrrell Racing in the 1988 season and also for the first race of the 1989 season. It used a customer Cosworth DFZ V8 engine as had its predecessor. The car was driven in 1988 by British pair Jonathan Palmer and Formula One rookie Julian Bailey. Bailey was replaced by Michele Alboreto in 1989 as was the Cosworth DFZ replaced by the more powerful 1988 motor the Cosworth DFR. It was the team's first car to use carbon fibre entirely in its construction, bringing the aluminum era in Formula 1 to an end.

The 017 was a development of the team's successful 1987 car, the Tyrrell DG016. However, as successful as the DG016 was in the naturally aspirated part of the championship (Tyrrell won the 'Colin Chapman Cup' as the leading atmospheric constructor while Jonathan Palmer won the 'Jim Clark Cup' as the atmo Drivers' Champion), the 017 was equally unsuccessful. Bailey failed to score a point and also failed to qualify for 10 races. Palmer scored all of the team's 5 points with Tyrrell finishing 8th in the Constructors' Championship.

For 1989 the car had minor upgrades for the first race of the season and was dubbed the 017B. The car was still uncompetitive and was replaced from the second race in San Marino with the Tyrrell 018.

== Complete Formula One results ==
(key)

Year	Team/Chassis	Engine	Tyres	Drivers	1	2	3	4	5	6	7	8	9	10	11	12	13	14	15	16	Pts.	WCC
1988	Tyrrell; 017	Cosworth DFZ; V8 NA	G		BRA	SMR	MON	MEX	CAN	DET	FRA	GBR	GER	HUN	BEL	ITA	POR	ESP	JPN	AUS	5	8th
1988	Tyrrell; 017	Cosworth DFZ; V8 NA	G	Jonathan Palmer	Ret	14	5	DNQ	6	5	Ret	Ret	11	Ret	12	DNQ	Ret	Ret	12	Ret	5	8th
1988	Tyrrell; 017	Cosworth DFZ; V8 NA	G	Julian Bailey	DNQ	Ret	DNQ	DNQ	Ret	9	DNQ	16	DNQ	DNQ	DNQ	12	DNQ	DNQ	14	DNQ	5	8th
1989	Tyrrell; 017B	Cosworth DFR; V8	G		BRA	SMR	MON	MEX	USA	CAN	FRA	GBR	GER	HUN	BEL	ITA	POR	ESP	JPN	AUS	16*	5th
1989	Tyrrell; 017B	Cosworth DFR; V8	G	Jonathan Palmer	7																16*	5th
1989	Tyrrell; 017B	Cosworth DFR; V8	G	Michele Alboreto	10																16*	5th

* All points in 1989 scored using the Tyrrell 018
