= 1989 San Marino Grand Prix =

F1 race

- Race 2 of 16 in the 1989 Formula One World Championship
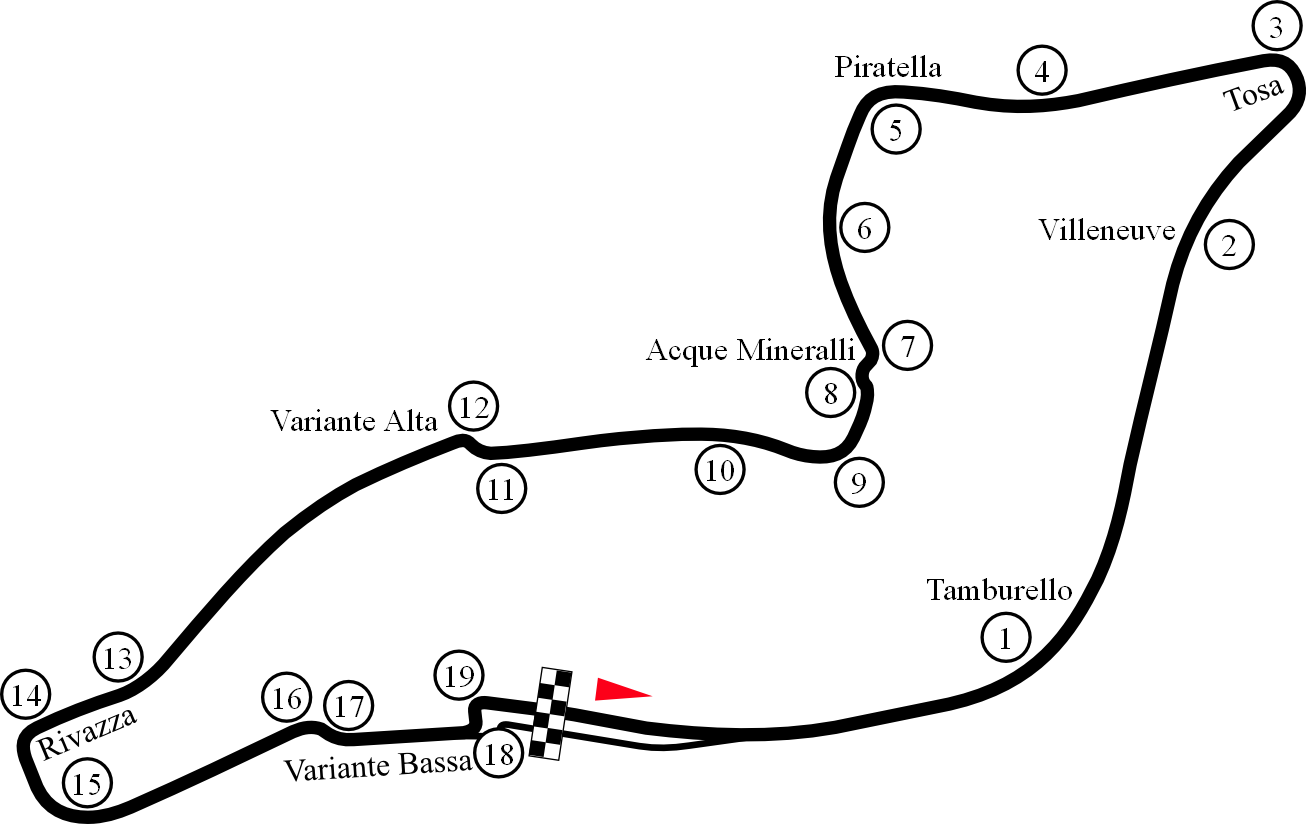

Race details
- Date: 23 April 1989
- Official name: IX Gran Premio Kronenbourg di San Marino
- Location: Autodromo Enzo e Dino Ferrari, Imola, Emilia-Romagna, Italy
- Course: Permanent racing facility
- Course length: 5.040 km (3.132 miles)
- Distance: 58 laps, 292.32 km (181.638 miles)
- Scheduled distance: 61 laps, 307.440 km (191.052 miles)
- Weather: Warm, dry, sunny

Pole position
| Driver | (Brazil) Ayrton Senna | McLaren-Honda |
- Time: 1:26.010

Fastest lap
| Driver | (France) Alain Prost | McLaren-Honda |
- Time: 1:26.795 on lap 45

Podium
| First | (Brazil) Ayrton Senna | McLaren-Honda |
| Second | (France) Alain Prost | McLaren-Honda |
| Third | (Italy) Alessandro Nannini | Benetton-Ford |

The 1989 San Marino Grand Prix (formally the IX Gran Premio Kronenbourg di San Marino) was a Formula One motor race held at the Imola circuit on 23 April 1989. It was the second race of the 1989 Formula One season. The race was overshadowed by Gerhard Berger's massive accident at Tamburello corner. The race was stopped for one hour and restarted. The race was won by Ayrton Senna who started from pole position. The Grand Prix had a total of 39 entrants, the largest amount in Formula One history. This record was equalled in the following 14 races of the season but, as of 2024, it has not been broken.

== Background ==
The event, officially titled the Gran Premio Kronenbourg di San Marino, was held at the Autodromo Enzo e Dino Ferrari in the Italian town of Imola, with free and qualifying practice sessions held on Friday 21 April and Saturday 22 April and a warm-up session and the main Grand Prix race held on Sunday 23 April 1989. Thirty-nine cars were entered for the event by twenty different constructors. Thirteen teams used Goodyear tyres whilst the other seven teams used Pirelli tyres. Larrousse introduced the Lola LC89 at this event and Tyrrell Racing introduced the 018, whilst Arrows, Brabham, Ligier, McLaren, Minardi, Onyx Grand Prix, Scuderia Ferrari, Scuderia Italia, Williams, and Zakspeed brought new modifications for their existing cars. Automobiles Gonfaronnaises Sportives (AGS) had built a new chassis to replace one destroyed in testing, whilst EuroBrun, Onyx Grand Prix, Williams, and Zakspeed had also built new chassis for spare cars. Osella had also repaired a chassis before this event. Starting from this event, Gabriele Tarquini replaced the paralysed Philippe Streiff at AGS.

== Qualifying ==
=== Pre-qualifying report ===
As at the previous race in Brazil, the Brabhams were easily the fastest cars in the Friday morning session. Stefano Modena was quickest on this occasion, with Martin Brundle in second. Alex Caffi pre-qualified his Dallara in third, with Nicola Larini's Osella in fourth. Only four cars went through from this session now that the injured Streiff had been replaced at AGS by Tarquini, who had left the abortive FIRST team.

Onyx improved on their showing in Brazil, with Bertrand Gachot just missing out on pre-qualification in fifth place. The EuroBrun of Gregor Foitek was sixth, ahead of the second Osella of Piercarlo Ghinzani. The other Onyx of Stefan Johansson was eighth, followed by the second AGS of Joachim Winkelhock. Tenth was the Coloni of Pierre-Henri Raphanel, just ahead of the two Zakspeeds of Aguri Suzuki and Bernd Schneider, the Japanese driver outpacing his more experienced team-mate. Nearly four seconds adrift at the bottom of the time sheets was the Rial of Volker Weidler, despite the German trying all three of the team's cars.

=== Pre-qualifying classification ===
| Pos | No | Driver | Constructor | Time | Gap |
|---|---|---|---|---|---|
| 1 | 8 | (Italy) Stefano Modena | Brabham-Judd | 1:27.350 | |
| 2 | 7 | (United Kingdom) Martin Brundle | Brabham-Judd | 1:28.197 | +0.747 |
| 3 | 21 | (Italy) Alex Caffi | Dallara-Ford | 1:29.346 | +1.996 |
| 4 | 17 | (Italy) Nicola Larini | Osella-Ford | 1:29.787 | +2.437 |
| 5 | 37 | (Belgium) Bertrand Gachot | Onyx-Ford | 1:30.384 | +3.034 |
| 6 | 33 | (Switzerland) Gregor Foitek | EuroBrun-Judd | 1:30.620 | +3.270 |
| 7 | 18 | (Italy) Piercarlo Ghinzani | Osella-Ford | 1:30.631 | +3.281 |
| 8 | 36 | (Sweden) Stefan Johansson | Onyx-Ford | 1:30.647 | +3.297 |
| 9 | 41 | (Germany) Joachim Winkelhock | AGS-Ford | 1:32.071 | +4.721 |
| 10 | 32 | (France) Pierre-Henri Raphanel | Coloni-Ford | 1:32.267 | +4.917 |
| 11 | 35 | (Japan) Aguri Suzuki | Zakspeed-Yamaha | 1:32.287 | +4.937 |
| 12 | 34 | (Germany) Bernd Schneider | Zakspeed-Yamaha | 1:32.855 | +5.485 |
| 13 | 39 | (Germany) Volker Weidler | Rial-Ford | 1:36.480 | +9.130 |

=== Qualifying report ===
The only change to the entry list for the San Marino Grand Prix was the arrival of Gabriele Tarquini in the second car of the small AGS team, which had only run one car in Brazil after Philippe Streiff had suffered career ending injuries in pre-season testing. A record 39 cars were entered for the Grand Prix, although only 26 were allowed to start the race.

After their defeat in Brazil, McLaren spent eight days testing at Imola prior to the San Marino Grand Prix. According to Ayrton Senna, they tested everything on the McLaren MP4/5, including aerodynamics, suspension, brakes and fuel consumption. It worked for Senna and Alain Prost, as they locked out the front row and were over 1.5 seconds faster than the Ferrari of Nigel Mansell. Riccardo Patrese showed his and Williams' revival with fourth on the grid followed by Gerhard Berger (Ferrari) with Thierry Boutsen rounding out the top six.

At Tyrrell, Michele Alboreto failed to qualify for a race for the first time since the 1981 German Grand Prix, in the new Tyrrell 018. Only one 018 was available, and although teammate Jonathan Palmer managed to sneak onto the grid in 25th in the older model 017, he raced the 018.

=== Qualifying classification ===
| Pos | No | Driver | Constructor | Q1 | Q2 | Gap |
|---|---|---|---|---|---|---|
| 1 | 1 | (Brazil) Ayrton Senna | McLaren-Honda | 1:42.939 | 1:26.010 | |
| 2 | 2 | (France) Alain Prost | McLaren-Honda | 1:44.538 | 1:26.235 | +0.225 |
| 3 | 27 | (United Kingdom) Nigel Mansell | Ferrari | 1:49.665 | 1:27.652 | +1.642 |
| 4 | 6 | (Italy) Riccardo Patrese | Williams-Renault | 1:47.486 | 1:27.920 | +1.910 |
| 5 | 28 | (Austria) Gerhard Berger | Ferrari | 1:42.781 | 1:28.089 | +2.079 |
| 6 | 5 | (Belgium) Thierry Boutsen | Williams-Renault | 1:49.451 | 1:28.308 | +2.298 |
| 7 | 19 | (Italy) Alessandro Nannini | Benetton-Ford | 1:45.536 | 1:28.854 | +2.844 |
| 8 | 11 | (Brazil) Nelson Piquet | Lotus-Judd | 1:48.124 | 1:29.057 | +3.047 |
| 9 | 21 | (Italy) Alex Caffi | Dallara-Ford | 1:48.868 | 1:29.069 | +3.059 |
| 10 | 26 | (France) Olivier Grouillard | Ligier-Ford | 1:47.371 | 1:29.104 | +3.094 |
| 11 | 23 | (Italy) Pierluigi Martini | Minardi-Ford | 1:47.321 | 1:29.152 | +3.142 |
| 12 | 9 | (United Kingdom) Derek Warwick | Arrows-Ford | 1:47.859 | 1:29.281 | +3.271 |
| 13 | 16 | (Italy) Ivan Capelli | March-Judd | 1:48.178 | 1:29.385 | +3.375 |
| 14 | 17 | (Italy) Nicola Larini | Osella-Ford | 1:47.577 | 1:29.485 | +3.475 |
| 15 | 24 | (Spain) Luis Pérez-Sala | Minardi-Ford | 1:46.800 | 1:29.503 | +3.493 |
| 16 | 22 | (Italy) Andrea de Cesaris | Dallara-Ford | 1:53.681 | 1:29.669 | +3.659 |
| 17 | 8 | (Italy) Stefano Modena | Brabham-Judd | 1:48.415 | 1:29.761 | +3.751 |
| 18 | 40 | (Italy) Gabriele Tarquini | AGS-Ford | 1:48.795 | 1:29.913 | +3.903 |
| 19 | 15 | (Brazil) Maurício Gugelmin | March-Judd | 1:52.119 | 1:30.163 | +4.153 |
| 20 | 30 | (France) Philippe Alliot | Lola-Lamborghini | 2:00.293 | 1:30.168 | +4.158 |
| 21 | 10 | (United States) Eddie Cheever | Arrows-Ford | 1:45.375 | 1:30.233 | +4.223 |
| 22 | 7 | (United Kingdom) Martin Brundle | Brabham-Judd | 1:46.279 | 1:30.271 | +4.261 |
| 23 | 20 | (United Kingdom) Johnny Herbert | Benetton-Ford | 2:05.126 | 1:30.347 | +4.337 |
| 24 | 12 | (Japan) Satoru Nakajima | Lotus-Judd | 1:46.483 | 1:30.697 | +4.687 |
| 25 | 3 | (United Kingdom) Jonathan Palmer | Tyrrell-Ford | 1:51.229 | 1:30.928 | +4.918 |
| 26 | 29 | (France) Yannick Dalmas | Lola-Lamborghini | 1:58.083 | 1:31.137 | +5.127 |
| 27 | 4 | (Italy) Michele Alboreto | Tyrrell-Ford | 1:51.329 | 1:31.206 | +5.196 |
| 28 | 25 | (France) René Arnoux | Ligier-Ford | 1:48.091 | 1:31.268 | +5.258 |
| 29 | 38 | (Germany) Christian Danner | Rial-Ford | 1:47.967 | 1:31.341 | +5.331 |
| 30 | 31 | (Brazil) Roberto Moreno | Coloni-Ford | 1:50.947 | 1:31.775 | +5.765 |

== Race ==
=== Start and lap 4 accident (red flag) ===
At the start, Ayrton Senna got away well but behind him Alain Prost found himself just ahead of Nigel Mansell's Ferrari but the Englishman could not find his way around Prost's McLaren. Mansell fell off a little after that and found himself battling with Riccardo Patrese while on the second lap Ivan Capelli had a nasty accident in his March. On lap four, fifth-placed Gerhard Berger's Ferrari speared off the track at the fast Tamburello corner due to a mechanical failure. Berger hit the wall at an estimated 180 mph and when his car came to a rest it was covered in fuel and it immediately burst into flames. Three fire marshalls (Bruno Miniati, Paolo Verdi and Gabriele Violi) arrived on foot sixteen seconds after impact and the fire was put out ten seconds later; the fuel had also burned up in the inferno. The race was red-flagged and Berger escaped with broken ribs and second-degree burns.

=== Race restart and conclusion ===
The race was restarted after half an hour and run a further 55 laps on aggregate timing. This time Prost got away much better and got past Senna while behind them Mansell made a poor start and fell behind Patrese and Alessandro Nannini. On the run-down to the Tosa hairpin Senna got alongside Prost into Villeneuve and out-braked him into Tosa. The McLarens proceeded to pull away from the competition while behind them there was more drama as Stefano Modena put his Brabham into the wall rather violently, escaping unhurt. Olivier Grouillard was disqualified on Lap 5 for his car being illegally worked on by his team during the one-hour delay.

As the McLarens pulled away Mansell, Patrese, and Nannini were busy fighting over third place. It was settled in the space of three laps as Patrese retired with a timing belt failure and Mansell followed shortly afterwards with a gearbox problem. This left Nannini in third while up front Senna cruised home to victory from Prost who, in his pursuit of Senna, had suffered a spin on lap 42 at Variante Bassa. Nannini led home Thierry Boutsen, Derek Warwick in the Arrows and Jonathan Palmer in the Tyrrell. Olivier Grouillard was disqualified because Ligier illegally repaired his car on the grid before the second start. Thierry Boutsen and Alex Caffi were initially disqualified after a protest from Ligier because they had changed tyres in the pitlane before the second start, but were reinstated following an appeal.

The Prost/Senna war began to build up speed after the Frenchman said that McLaren had a pre-race agreement that whoever led into the first turn should stay there, which was ironically suggested by Senna. In Prost's view, Senna had broken this agreement by passing him partway round the first lap after the restart.

=== Race classification ===
| Pos | No | Driver | Constructor | Laps | Time/Retired | Grid | Points |
|---|---|---|---|---|---|---|---|
| 1 | 1 | (Brazil) Ayrton Senna | McLaren-Honda | 58 | 1:26:51.245 | 1 | 9 |
| 2 | 2 | (France) Alain Prost | McLaren-Honda | 58 | + 40.225 | 2 | 6 |
| 3 | 19 | (Italy) Alessandro Nannini | Benetton-Ford | 57 | + 1 lap | 7 | 4 |
| 4 | 5 | (Belgium) Thierry Boutsen | Williams-Renault | 57 | + 1 lap | 6 | 3 |
| 5 | 9 | (United Kingdom) Derek Warwick | Arrows-Ford | 57 | + 1 lap | 12 | 2 |
| 6 | 3 | (United Kingdom) Jonathan Palmer | Tyrrell-Ford | 57 | + 1 lap | 25 | 1 |
| 7 | 21 | (Italy) Alex Caffi | Dallara-Ford | 57 | + 1 lap | 9 | |
| 8 | 40 | (Italy) Gabriele Tarquini | AGS-Ford | 57 | + 1 lap | 18 | |
| 9 | 10 | (United States) Eddie Cheever | Arrows-Ford | 56 | + 2 laps | 21 | |
| 10 | 22 | (Italy) Andrea de Cesaris | Dallara-Ford | 56 | + 2 laps | 16 | |
| 11 | 20 | (United Kingdom) Johnny Herbert | Benetton-Ford | 56 | + 2 laps | 23 | |
| 12 | 17 | (Italy) Nicola Larini | Osella-Ford | 52 | Spun off | 14 | |
| Ret | 7 | (United Kingdom) Martin Brundle | Brabham-Judd | 51 | Fuel system | 22 | |
| NC | 12 | (Japan) Satoru Nakajima | Lotus-Judd | 46 | + 12 laps | 24 | |
| Ret | 24 | (Spain) Luis Pérez-Sala | Minardi-Ford | 43 | Spun off | 15 | |
| Ret | 15 | (Brazil) Maurício Gugelmin | March-Judd | 39 | Transmission | 19 | |
| Ret | 11 | (Brazil) Nelson Piquet | Lotus-Judd | 29 | Engine | 8 | |
| Ret | 27 | (United Kingdom) Nigel Mansell | Ferrari | 23 | Gearbox | 3 | |
| Ret | 6 | (Italy) Riccardo Patrese | Williams-Renault | 21 | Engine | 4 | |
| Ret | 8 | (Italy) Stefano Modena | Brabham-Judd | 19 | Spun off | 17 | |
| Ret | 23 | (Italy) Pierluigi Martini | Minardi-Ford | 6 | Gearbox | 11 | |
| DSQ | 26 | (France) Olivier Grouillard | Ligier-Ford | 4 | Illegal car repairs | 10 | |
| Ret | 28 | (Austria) Gerhard Berger | Ferrari | 3 | Accident | 5 | |
| Ret | 16 | (Italy) Ivan Capelli | March-Judd | 1 | Spun off | 13 | |
| Ret | 30 | (France) Philippe Alliot | Lola-Lamborghini | 0 | Electrical | 20 | |
| DNS | 29 | (France) Yannick Dalmas | Lola-Lamborghini | 0 | Electrical | 26 | |
| DNQ | 4 | (Italy) Michele Alboreto | Tyrrell-Ford | | | | |
| DNQ | 25 | (France) René Arnoux | Ligier-Ford | | | | |
| DNQ | 38 | (Germany) Christian Danner | Rial-Ford | | | | |
| DNQ | 31 | (Brazil) Roberto Moreno | Coloni-Ford | | | | |
| DNPQ | 37 | (Belgium) Bertrand Gachot | Onyx-Ford | | | | |
| DNPQ | 33 | (Switzerland) Gregor Foitek | EuroBrun-Judd | | | | |
| DNPQ | 18 | (Italy) Piercarlo Ghinzani | Osella-Ford | | | | |
| DNPQ | 36 | (Sweden) Stefan Johansson | Onyx-Ford | | | | |
| DNPQ | 41 | (Germany) Joachim Winkelhock | AGS-Ford | | | | |
| DNPQ | 32 | (France) Pierre-Henri Raphanel | Coloni-Ford | | | | |
| DNPQ | 35 | (Japan) Aguri Suzuki | Zakspeed-Yamaha | | | | |
| DNPQ | 34 | (Germany) Bernd Schneider | Zakspeed-Yamaha | | | | |
| DNPQ | 39 | (Germany) Volker Weidler | Rial-Ford | | | | |

== Championship standings after the race ==
Drivers' Championship standings

| Pos | Driver | Points |
|---|---|---|
| 1 | (France) Alain Prost | 12 |
| 2 | (Brazil) Ayrton Senna | 9 |
| 3 | (United Kingdom) Nigel Mansell | 9 |
| 4 | (Italy) Alessandro Nannini | 5 |
| 5 | (Brazil) Maurício Gugelmin | 4 |

Constructors' Championship standings

| Pos | Constructor | Points |
|---|---|---|
| 1 | (United Kingdom) McLaren-Honda | 21 |
| 2 | (Italy) Ferrari | 9 |
| 3 | (United Kingdom) Benetton-Ford | 8 |
| 4 | (United Kingdom) March-Judd | 4 |
| 5 | (United Kingdom) Arrows-Ford | 4 |

- Note: Only the top five positions are included for both sets of standings.

| Previous race: 1989 Brazilian Grand Prix | FIA Formula One World Championship; 1989 season | Next race: 1989 Monaco Grand Prix |
| Previous race: 1988 San Marino Grand Prix | San Marino Grand Prix | Next race: 1990 San Marino Grand Prix |
