= Tyrrell 018 =

Formula One racing car

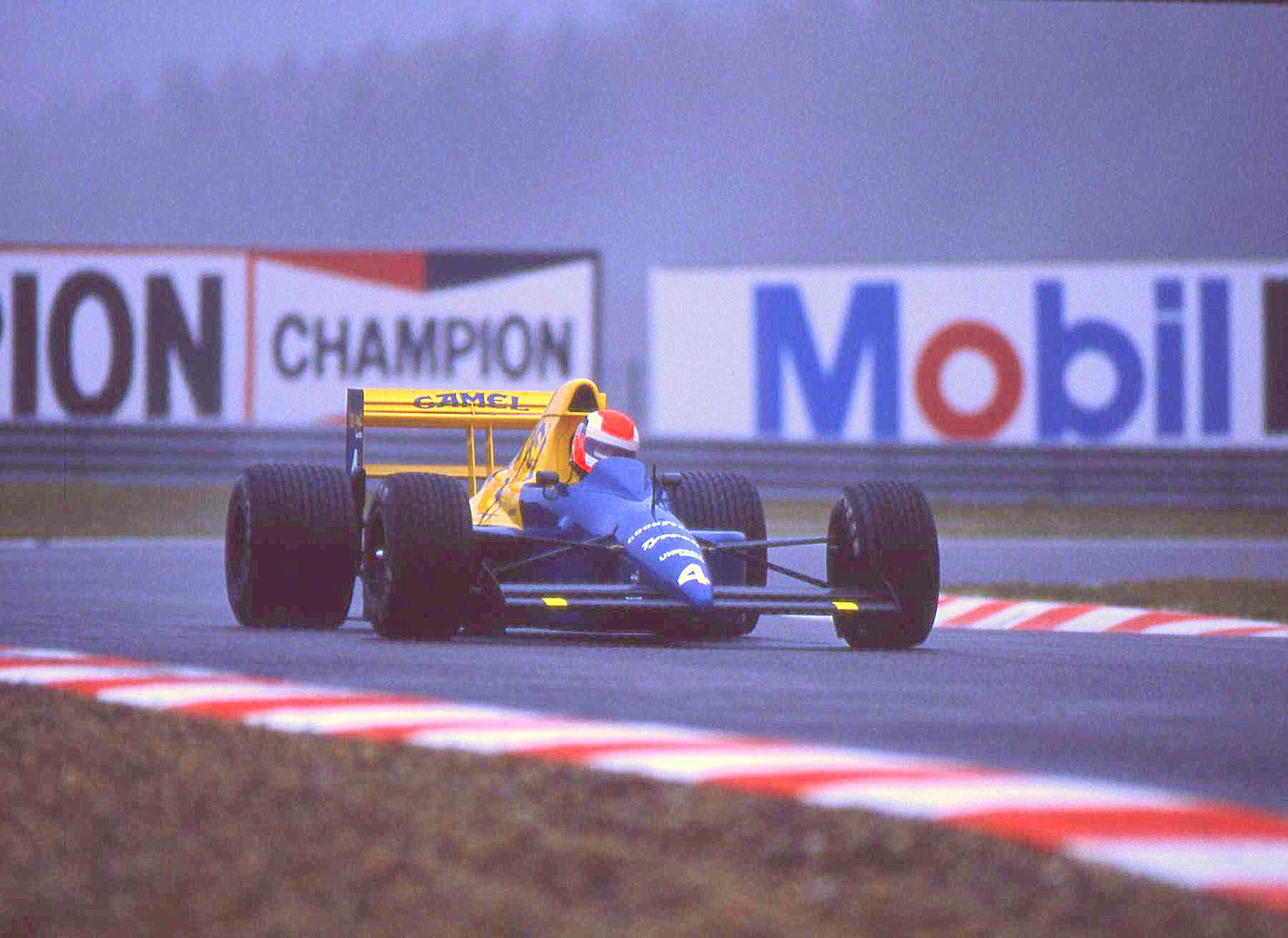
- Johnny Herbert driving the 018 at the 1989 Belgian Grand Prix
- Category: Formula One
- Constructor: Tyrrell
- Designers: Harvey Postlethwaite (Technical Director); Jean-Claude Migeot (Chief Designer)
- Predecessor: 017B
- Successor: 019

Technical specifications
- Chassis: Aluminium and Carbon fibre monocoque
- Engine: Ford DFR, 3,493 cc (213.2 cu in), 90° V8, NA, mid-engine, longitudinally mounted
- Transmission: Tyrrell 6-speed manual
- Fuel: Elf
- Tyres: 1989: Goodyear; 1990: Pirelli

Competition history
- Notable entrants: Tyrrell Racing Organisation
- Notable drivers: 3. (United Kingdom) Jonathan Palmer; 4. (Italy) Michele Alboreto; 4. (France) Jean Alesi; 4. (United Kingdom) Johnny Herbert; 3. (Japan) Satoru Nakajima
- Debut: 1989 San Marino Grand Prix
- Last event: 1990 Brazilian Grand Prix
Races	Wins	Poles	F/Laps
17	0	0	1
- Constructors' Championships: 0
- Drivers' Championships: 0

The Tyrrell 018 was a Formula One racing car designed by Harvey Postlethwaite and Jean-Claude Migeot. It was built and raced by Tyrrell Racing. It used a customer Ford DFR engine.

== History ==
=== 1989 ===
The 018 made its debut at the second race of the 1989 Formula One season, the San Marino Grand Prix. Michele Alboreto was given the car for qualifying, but had problems with the fuel pump and failed to qualify. Jonathan Palmer qualified the team's old 017B but raced the newer 018 instead, which he drove into the points with a sixth place. Two races later at the Mexican Grand Prix Alboreto took a third place behind reigning world champion Ayrton Senna and fellow Italian F1 veteran Riccardo Patrese.

It was generally believed in the F1 paddock at the time that the 018 with its sleek aerodynamics was one of the fastest of the new 3.5L cars in a straight line, despite running the underpowered customer DFR engine.

=== 1990 ===
The 018 was replaced after two races of the 1990 Formula One season by the first of the "high-nose" cars in Formula One, the Tyrrell 019.

The 018 was the first Tyrrell to lead a Grand Prix since Alboreto won the 1983 Detroit Grand Prix when Alesi jumped from fourth to first at the start of the 1990 United States Grand Prix and led the first 34 laps of the race before being passed by the McLaren-Honda of Ayrton Senna.

== Livery ==
=== 1989 ===
During its debut, the 018 was painted in a dark blue livery. Starting from the French Grand Prix, the yellow accents were added, courtesy of the cigarette brand Camel. The team gained several minor sponsors as the season progressed including Autobacs.

=== 1990 ===
For 1990, the livery was changed to a white and dark blue colour. The Camel sponsorship were eventually dropped. This livery would be carried over by its successor.

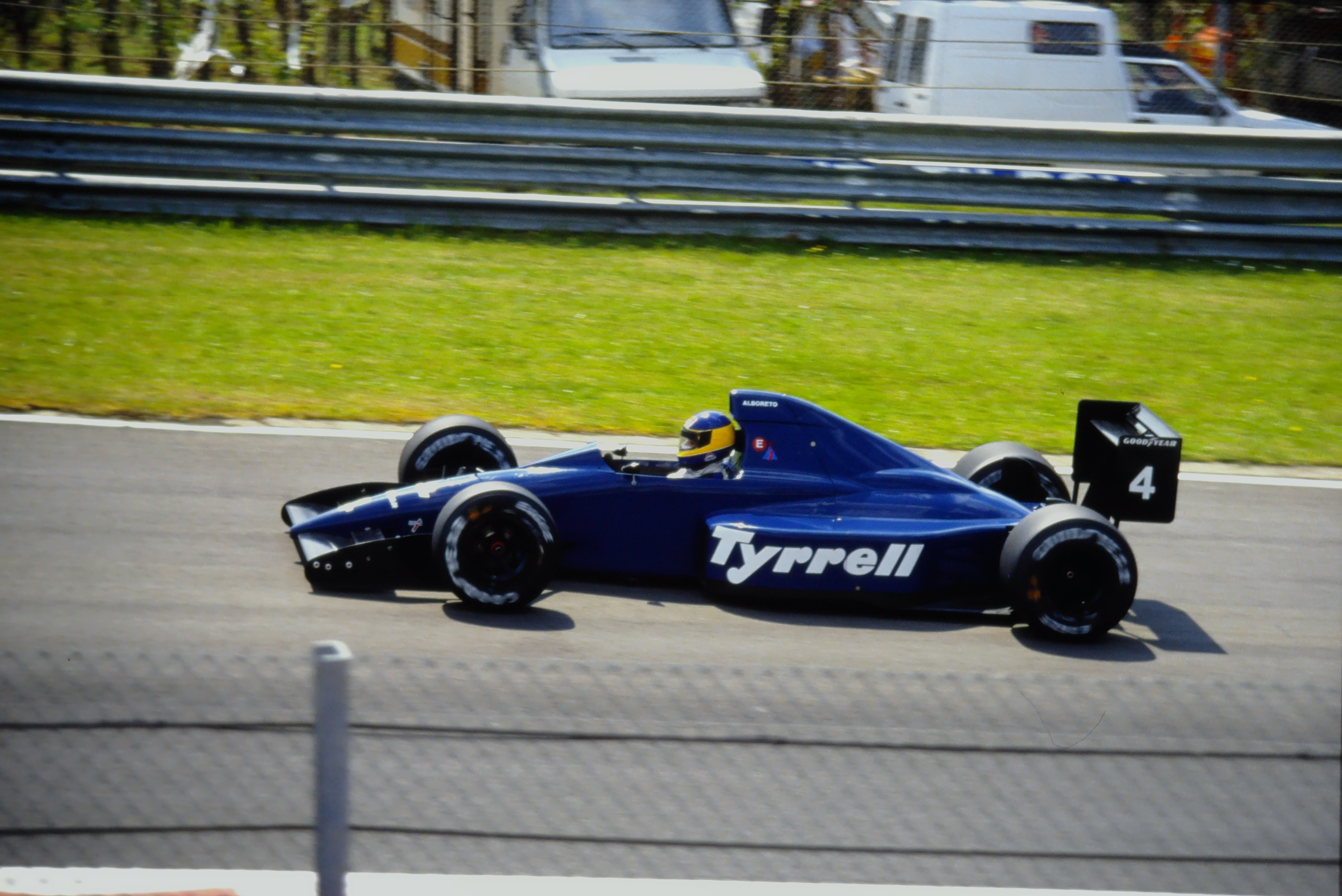
Michele Alboreto driving the Tyrrell 018 at Imola during its debut meeting

== Complete Formula One results ==
(key) (results in italics indicate fastest lap)

Year	Entrant	Engine	Tyres	Drivers	1	2	3	4	5	6	7	8	9	10	11	12	13	14	15	16	Pts.	WCC
1989	Tyrrell Racing Organisation	Ford DFR; V8	G		BRA	SMR	MON	MEX	USA	CAN	FRA	GBR	GER	HUN	BEL	ITA	POR	ESP	JPN	AUS	16	5th
1989	Tyrrell Racing Organisation	Ford DFR; V8	G	Jonathan Palmer		6	9	Ret	9	Ret	10	Ret	Ret	13	14	Ret	6	10	Ret	DNQ	16	5th
1989	Tyrrell Racing Organisation	Ford DFR; V8	G	Michele Alboreto		DNQ	5	3	Ret	Ret											16	5th
1989	Tyrrell Racing Organisation	Ford DFR; V8	G	Jean Alesi							4	Ret	10	9		5		4	Ret	Ret	16	5th
1989	Tyrrell Racing Organisation	Ford DFR; V8	G	Johnny Herbert											Ret		DNQ				16	5th
1990	Tyrrell Racing Organisation	Ford DFR; V8	P		USA	BRA	SMR	MON	CAN	MEX	FRA	GBR	GER	HUN	BEL	ITA	POR	ESP	JPN	AUS	16*	5th
1990	Tyrrell Racing Organisation	Ford DFR; V8	P	Satoru Nakajima	6	8															16*	5th
1990	Tyrrell Racing Organisation	Ford DFR; V8	P	Jean Alesi	2	7															16*	5th

* 9 points scored in 1990 using Tyrrell 019.
