= Jonathan Palmer =

British racing driver and motorsport executive (born 1956)

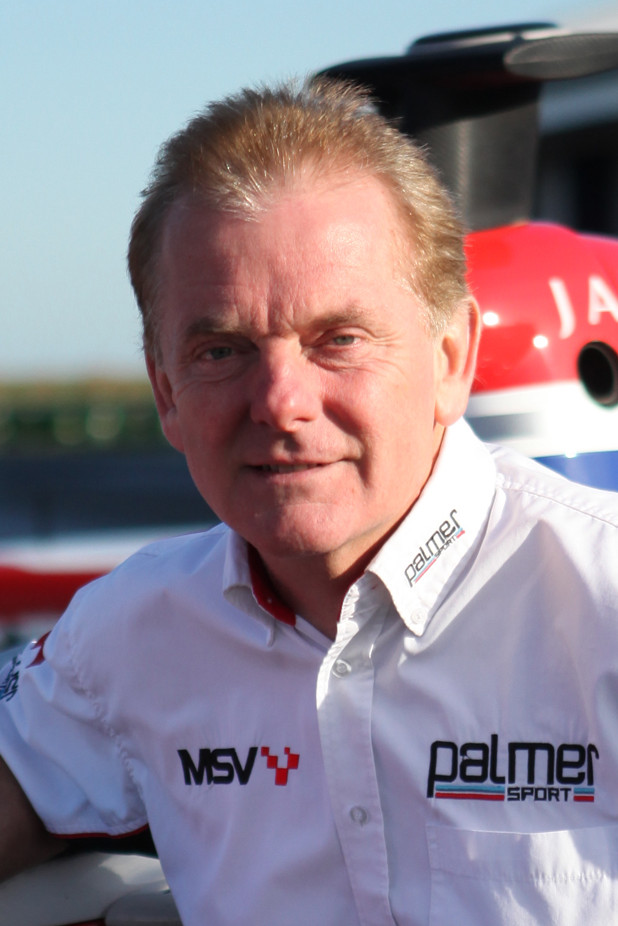
- Palmer in 2011
- Born: Jonathan Charles Palmer; 7 November 1956 (age 70); Lewisham, London, England
- Spouses: Gillian (m. 1988; div. 2011) Emma Collins (m. 2018)
- Children: 4, including Jolyon and Will

Formula One World Championship career
- Nationality: (United Kingdom) British
- Active years: 1983–1989
- Team(s): Williams, RAM, Zakspeed, Tyrrell
- Entries: 88 (83 starts)
- Championships: 0
- Wins: 0
- Podiums: 0
- Career points: 14
- Pole positions: 0
- Fastest laps: 1
- First entry: 1983 European Grand Prix
- Last entry: 1989 Australian Grand Prix

24 Hours of Le Mans career
- Years: 1983–1985, 1987, 1990–1991
- Teams: RLR, Porsche, Sauber
- Best finish: 2nd (1985)
- Class wins: 0

Jonathan Charles Palmer (born 7 November 1956) is a British former racing driver, motorsport executive, and broadcaster, who competed in Formula One from 1983 to 1989.

Before opting for a career in motor racing, Palmer trained as a physician at London's Guy's Hospital. He also worked as a junior physician at Cuckfield and Brighton hospitals. Palmer was active in Formula One between 1983 and 1989, and drove for Tyrrell, Williams, RAM, and Zakspeed. He won 14 Championship points from 83 starts, and was the winner of the Jim Clark Trophy, a competition for drivers of non-turbo cars which existed only for the 1987 season. He also raced a Group C Porsche in sports car events between 1983 and 1990, winning the 1984 1000 km of Brands Hatch with co-driver Jan Lammers and taking second place at the 1985 24 Hours of Le Mans with co-drivers James Weaver and Richard Lloyd.

Palmer helped develop the McLaren F1 road car, and drove one to a new speed record for production cars. He is the majority shareholder and Chief Executive of MotorSport Vision (MSV), a company that runs six UK motorsport circuits, the PalmerSport corporate driving event at Bedford Autodrome and several racing championships including British Superbikes and GB3 and GB4. His son, Jolyon, competed in Formula One from 2016 to 2017.

== Racing career ==
Jonathan Charles Palmer was born on 7 November 1956 in Lewisham, London, England.

=== Early career ===
Following his education at Brighton College, Palmer raced an Austin Healey Sprite and a Marcos in club events while he was a medical student at Guy's Hospital. He went on to work as a doctor at Cuckfield and Brighton hospitals, and opted for a professional driving career after he had participated in Formula Ford from 1978 to 1980. He won the British Formula 3 Championship in 1981, and landed a Williams Formula One test drive in 1982. The following year, he won the European Formula Two Championship, and the British Racing Drivers' Club awarded him their Gold Star.

=== Formula One ===
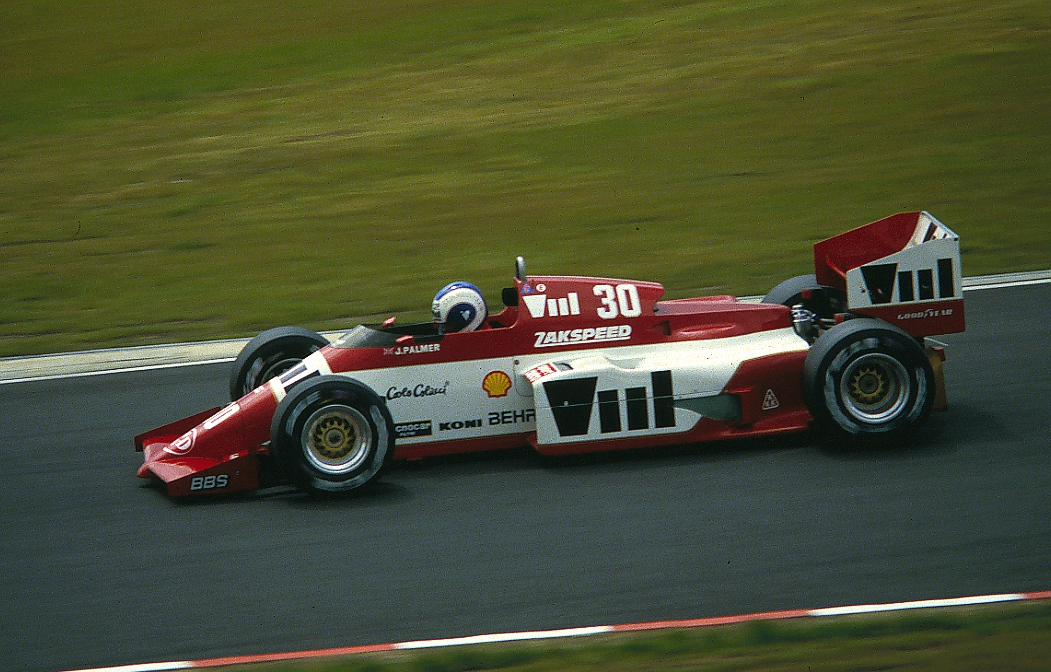
Palmer driving for Zakspeed at the 1985 German Grand Prix

Palmer joined Williams as a test driver for the 1982 and 1983 seasons whilst racing in F2, and made his Formula One debut at Brands Hatch on 25 September 1983, driving a Williams in the European Grand Prix. This drive was a 'thank you' from Frank Williams and Patrick Head. He finished 13th out of 26 starters. Moving to the Skoal Bandit RAM March team in 1984, his six finishes yielded one eighth place, three ninth places, one tenth place, and one 13th place. He joined Zakspeed in 1985, starting in eight races and retiring from all except the 1985 Detroit Grand Prix, where he finished 11th. Sixteen starts with the same team in 1986 resulted in eight retirements and a best finish of eighth in Detroit. At his home race at Brands Hatch that year, Palmer used his qualified general practitioner skills to assist the extrication of Ligier driver Jacques Laffite after Laffite suffered a career-ending crash on the opening lap.

In 1987, Palmer talked to McLaren team principal and co-owner Ron Dennis about becoming the team's No. 2 driver to double World Champion Alain Prost. Dennis ultimately signed Stefan Johansson, and Palmer joined Tyrrell a week before the season's opening race in Brazil. Although outpaced by its turbocharged competitors, Tyrrell's naturally-aspirated Cosworth-powered car proved reliable, and it was nimble on tighter circuits. Palmer won championship points in three races, and it was in Australia that he achieved his career-best fourth-place finish. He also won the Jim Clark Trophy, a championship for drivers of normally aspirated cars. He stayed with Tyrrell for the next two seasons, during which his best results were two fifth-place finishes and three sixth-place finishes. At the end of 1989, he signed as McLaren's test driver.

=== Sportscars ===
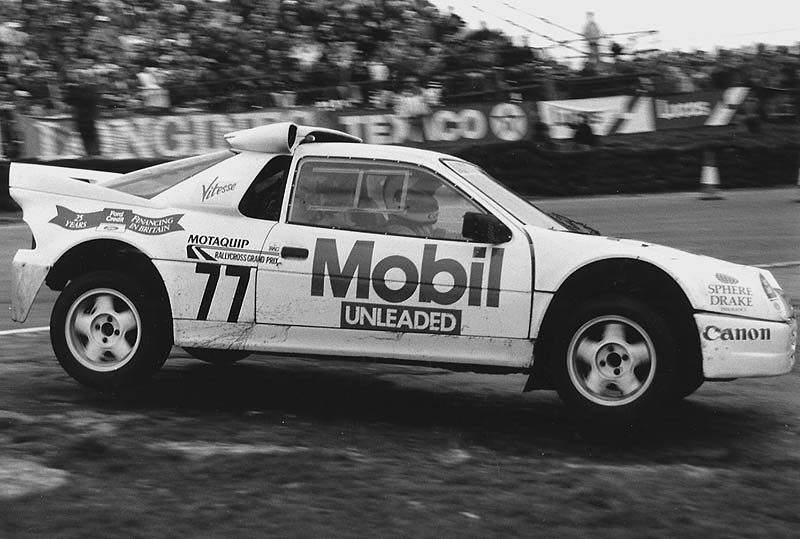
Palmer driving a Ford RS200 at Brands Hatch in 1990.

Between 1983 and 1990, Palmer competed in the World Sportscar Championship at the wheel of a Group C Porsche. With co-driver Jan Lammers he won the 1984 1000 km of Brands Hatch. At Le Mans, his best result from five starts was second place in 1985, with co-drivers James Weaver and Richard Lloyd.

=== Other racing ===
In 1987, Palmer took part in the Toyota Rallysprint at Brands Hatch, which he won overall.

In 1991, Palmer came seventh in the British Touring Car Championship, driving a Prodrive BMW. Also that year he became a pit lane reporter for the BBC F1 commentary team. Following James Hunt's death from a heart attack after the 1993 Canadian Grand Prix, Palmer joined the BBC commentary box alongside Murray Walker. At the end of 1996, the BBC lost the rights to broadcast Formula One, and in 1997 Palmer joined the CBC for its annual commentary on the Grand Prix of Canada.

In both 1995 and 1996, Palmer participated in the Goodwood Festival of Speed, setting the fastest time of the shootout.

=== Road car development ===
Palmer's work with McLaren included development of the McLaren F1 road car, and he drove one to a record-breaking 231 mph at the Nardo test track.

== Business career ==
PalmerSport was founded in 1991 to run corporate hospitality motorsport events. This was initially run from the Bruntingthorpe airfield in Leicestershire before the lease was acquired to develop the site now known as Bedford Autodrome.

Palmer opened the venue in 1999 as four separate circuits with a total of six miles of track, to become the permanent home for PalmerSport. The venue is also used for track days.

Palmer launched the Formula Palmer Audi Championship in 1998 as a less costly alternative to Formula 3. Inaugural champion Justin Wilson went on to win the Formula 3000 championship. With Palmer managing his career, an innovative share issue in Wilson helped him secure a Formula One drive with Minardi.

In 2004, Palmer, John Britten, and Sir Peter Ogden acquired the Brands Hatch, Oulton Park, Snetterton and Cadwell Park circuits from Octagon, under the umbrella of MotorSport Vision (MSV). The company has turned around the fortunes of each circuit, and implemented a programme of improvements at each venue to develop better facilities for spectators and circuit users. Snetterton in particular has been revitalised under MSV ownership, with the circuit undergoing a near total redesign in 2011, with several new corners allowing for three different circuit configurations, and the addition of large spectator viewing areas.

The company, with Palmer as Chief Executive, organised the Formula Palmer Audi Championship, acquired the commercial rights for the British Superbike Championship, and secured the right to operate the FIA Formula Two Championship from 2009 to 2012. It now runs the GB3 and GB4 Championships, as well as several other club series and championships under the MSVR banner.

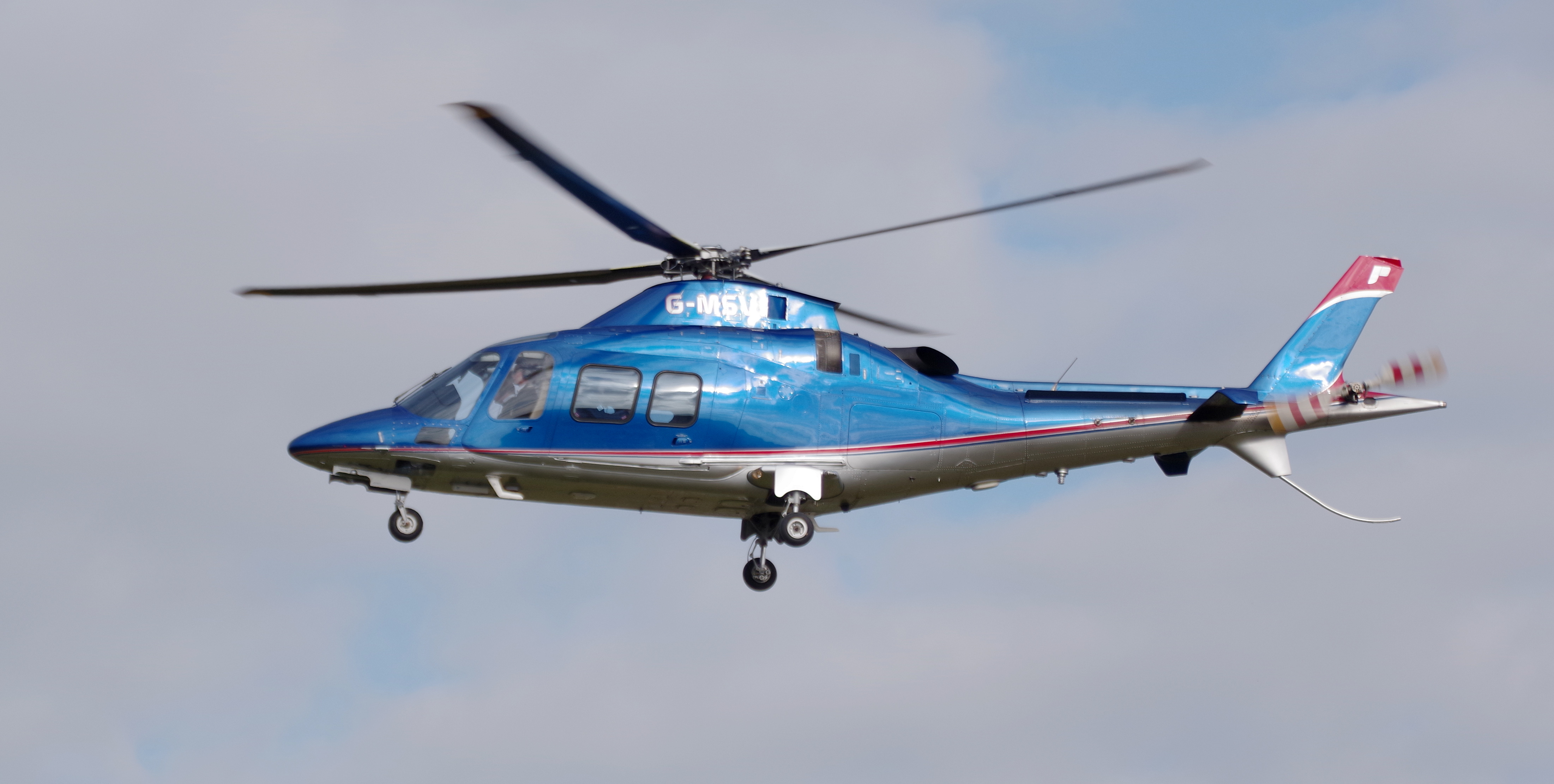
AgustaWestland AW109S G-MSVI owned by Palmer's company MSV flying above Brands Hatch for the 2018 British Touring Car Championship finale.

In 2009, MSV acquired the freehold of 800 acres of the Bedford Autodrome site and opened Bedford Aerodrome as a CAA licensed airfield in 2010.

MSV completed the freehold purchase of a substantial former military airbase near Laon in north-east France in 2015, which is planned to be developed into a major international motorsports complex.

In 2017, MSV acquired the Donington Park motor racing circuit, and implemented a multi-million pound program of improvements at the East Midlands track including a new bar, cafe and restaurant, a new circuit office, extensive resurfacing of paddock areas and internal roads and a new grandstand with views of the track.

On 30 September 2022, it was announced that MSV won the bid for purchasing Circuito de Navarra in northern Spain. MSV has since completed the first phase of its programme of improvements involving a complete overhaul of the race control complex. This included new screens and upgraded CCTV technology, along with a complete exterior redecoration of the race control tower and main pit buildings, including all the garage doors. This exterior aesthetic overhaul has extended beyond that area too, elevating the FIA Grade 1T and Grade 2 circuit's presentation to match its status as one of Spain's best motorsport venues.

== Personal life ==
Palmer's two sons have both had successful motor racing careers. Jolyon Palmer, the 2014 GP2 Series champion, drove for RenaultSport F1 Team during the 2016 and 2017 seasons and is now a commentator and columnist for BBC Sport F1. Jonathan's younger son Will Palmer won the BRDC F4 Championship and the prestigious McLaren Autosport BRDC Award in 2015, and finished second in Renault Eurocup in 2017.

Palmer also has two daughters: Emily, an accountant, and Alice, a professional equestrian showjumper.

== Racing record ==
=== Career summary ===
| Season | Series | Team | Races | Wins | Poles | F/Laps | Podiums | Points | Position |
|---|---|---|---|---|---|---|---|---|---|
| 1980 | Formula Ford 1600 | N/A | ? | ? | ? | ? | ? | 42 | 6th |
| 1981 | British Formula Three | West Surrey Racing | 19 | 7 | 6 | 9 | 14 | 126 | **1st** |
| 1981 | European Formula Three | West Surrey Racing | 1 | 0 | 0 | 0 | 1 | 4 | 13th |
| 1981 | European Touring Car Championship | GTI Engineering | 1 | 0 | 0 | 0 | 0 | 0 | NC |
| 1982 | European Formula Two | Ralt Racing | 11 | 0 | 1 | 0 | 1 | 10 | 9th |
| 1982 | World Sportscar Championship | Richard Lloyd Racing | 3 | 0 | 0 | 0 | 0 | 10 | 46th |
| 1982 | European Touring Car Championship | Bastos Juma Racing | 1 | 0 | 0 | 0 | 0 | 0 | NC |
| 1983 | European Formula Two | Ralt Racing | 12 | 6 | 4 | 3 | 10 | 68 | **1st** |
| 1983 | World Sportscar Championship | Richard Lloyd Racing | 3 | 0 | 0 | 0 | 1 | 23 | 16th |
| 1983 | European Endurance Championship | Richard Lloyd Racing | 3 | 0 | 1 | 0 | 1 | 39 | 13th |
| 1983 | IMSA GT Championship | Richard Lloyd Racing | 1 | 0 | 0 | 0 | 0 | 0 | NC |
| 1983 | Japanese Formula Two | Ralt Racing | 1 | 0 | 0 | 0 | 0 | 0 | NC |
| 1983 | British Saloon Car Championship | Cheylesmore BMW Motorsport | 1 | 0 | 0 | 0 | 0 | 2 | 29th |
| 1983 | European Touring Car Championship | Autosport & Design | 1 | 0 | 0 | 0 | 1 | 0 | NC |
| 1983 | Formula One | TAG Williams Team | 1 | 0 | 0 | 0 | 0 | 0 | NC |
| 1984 | Formula One | Skoal Bandit Formula 1 Team | 14 | 0 | 0 | 0 | 0 | 0 | NC |
| 1984 | World Sportscar Championship | GTI Engineering | 8 | 1 | 1 | 2 | 3 | 75 | 6th |
| 1984 | Deutsche Rennsport Meisterschaft | N/A | 3 | 1 | 1 | ? | 2 | 45 | 4th |
| 1985 | Formula One | West Zakspeed Racing | 7 | 0 | 0 | 0 | 0 | 0 | NC |
| 1985 | World Sportscar Championship | Richard Lloyd Racing | 4 | 0 | 0 | 1 | 1 | 39 | 12th |
| 1985 | 24 Hours of Le Mans | Richard Lloyd Racing | 1 | 0 | 0 | 0 | 1 | N/A | **2nd** |
| 1985 | IMSA GT Championship | Richard Lloyd Racing | 1 | 0 | 0 | 0 | 0 | N/A | NC |
| 1986 | Formula One | West Zakspeed Racing | 16 | 0 | 0 | 0 | 0 | 0 | NC |
| 1987 | Formula One | Data General Team Tyrrell | 15 | 0 | 0 | 0 | 0 | 7^{†} | 11th |
| 1987 | World Sportscar Championship | Richard Lloyd Racing | 7 | 1 | 0 | 0 | 1 | 31 | 19th |
| 1988 | Formula One | Tyrrell Racing Organisation | 14 | 0 | 0 | 0 | 0 | 5 | 14th |
| 1988 | European Touring Car Championship | Kaliber Racing | 1 | 0 | 0 | 0 | 0 | 0 | NC |
| 1989 | Formula One | Tyrrell Racing Organisation | 15 | 0 | 0 | 1 | 0 | 2 | 25th |
| 1990 | World Sportscar Championship | Joest Porsche Racing | 9 | 0 | 0 | 0 | 0 | 2 | 31st |
| 1991 | British Touring Car Championship | BMW Team Finance | 15 | 0 | 1 | ? | 2 | 66 | 7th |
| 1991 | World Sportscar Championship | Team Salamin Primagaz | 1 | 0 | 0 | 0 | 0 | 0 | NC |
| 1991 | World Sportscar Championship | Team Sauber-Mercedes | 1 | 0 | 0 | 0 | 0 | 0 | NC |
| 1991 | All-Japan Sports Prototype Championship | The Alpha Racing | 1 | 0 | 0 | 0 | 0 | 3 | 40th |

^{†} 1st place in the Jim Clark Trophy, for naturally aspirated cars.

=== Complete European Formula Two Championship results ===
(key) (Races in bold indicate pole position; races in italics indicate fastest lap)

| Year | Entrant | Chassis | Engine | 1 | 2 | 3 | 4 | 5 | 6 | 7 | 8 | 9 | 10 | 11 | 12 | 13 | Pos. | Pts |
|---|---|---|---|---|---|---|---|---|---|---|---|---|---|---|---|---|---|---|
| 1982 | Ralt Racing | Ralt RH6/82 | Honda | SIL; 15 | HOC; Ret | THR; 11 | NÜR; 14 | MUG; 5 | VAL; 5 | PAU; 6 | SPA; 6 | HOC; Ret | **DON**; 3 | MAN; Ret | PER; DNS | MIS | 9th | 10 |
| 1983 | Ralt Racing | Ralt RH6/83 | Honda | SIL; Ret | THR; 3 | HOC; 1 | NÜR; 4 | VAL; 2 | PAU; 3 | **JAR**; 3 | **DON**; 1 | MIS; 1 | PER; 1 | **ZOL**; 1 | **MUG**; 1 | | **1st** | **68** |

=== Complete Formula One results ===
(key) (Races in italics indicate fastest lap)

| Year | Entrant | Chassis | Engine | 1 | 2 | 3 | 4 | 5 | 6 | 7 | 8 | 9 | 10 | 11 | 12 | 13 | 14 | 15 | 16 | WDC | Pts |
|---|---|---|---|---|---|---|---|---|---|---|---|---|---|---|---|---|---|---|---|---|---|
| 1983 | TAG Williams Team | Williams FW08C | Ford Cosworth DFV 3.0 V8 | BRA | USW | FRA | SMR | MON | BEL | DET | CAN | GBR | GER | AUT | NED | ITA | EUR; 13 | RSA | | NC | 0 |
| 1984 | Skoal Bandit Formula 1 Team | RAM 01 | Hart 415T 1.5 L4 t | BRA; 8 | RSA; Ret | | | | | | | | | | | | | | | NC | 0 |
| 1984 | Skoal Bandit Formula 1 Team | RAM 02 | Hart 415T 1.5 L4 t | | | BEL; 10 | SMR; 9 | FRA; 13 | MON; DNQ | CAN | DET; Ret | DAL; Ret | GBR; Ret | GER; Ret | AUT; 9 | NED; 9 | ITA; Ret | EUR; Ret | POR; Ret | NC | 0 |
| 1985 | West Zakspeed Racing | Zakspeed 841 | Zakspeed 1500/4 1.5 L4 t | BRA | POR; Ret | SMR; DNS | MON; 11 | CAN | DET | FRA; Ret | GBR; Ret | GER; Ret | AUT; Ret | NED; Ret | ITA | BEL | EUR | RSA | AUS | NC | 0 |
| 1986 | West Zakspeed Racing | Zakspeed 861 | Zakspeed 1500/4 1.5 L4 t | BRA; Ret | ESP; Ret | SMR; Ret | MON; 12 | BEL; 13 | CAN; Ret | DET; 8 | FRA; Ret | GBR; 9 | GER; Ret | HUN; 10 | AUT; Ret | ITA; Ret | POR; 12 | MEX; 10 | AUS; 9 | NC | 0 |
| 1987 | Data General Team Tyrrell | Tyrrell DG016 | Ford Cosworth DFZ 3.5 V8 | BRA; 10 | SMR; Ret | BEL; Ret | MON; 5 | DET; 11 | FRA; 7 | GBR; 8 | GER; 5 | HUN; 7 | AUT; 14 | ITA; 14 | POR; 10 | ESP; Ret | MEX; 7 | JPN; 8 | AUS; 4 | 11th | 7^{†} |
| 1988 | Tyrrell Racing Organisation | Tyrrell 017 | Ford Cosworth DFZ 3.5 V8 | BRA; Ret | SMR; 14 | MON; 5 | MEX; DNQ | CAN; 6 | DET; 5 | FRA; Ret | GBR; Ret | GER; 11 | HUN; Ret | BEL; 12 | ITA; DNQ | POR; Ret | ESP; Ret | JPN; 12 | AUS; Ret | 14th | 5 |
| 1989 | Tyrrell Racing Organisation | Tyrrell 017B | Ford Cosworth DFR 3.5 V8 | BRA; 7 | | | | | | | | | | | | | | | | 25th | 2 |
| 1989 | Tyrrell Racing Organisation | Tyrrell 018 | Ford Cosworth DFR 3.5 V8 | | SMR; 6 | MON; 9 | MEX; Ret | USA; 9 | CAN; Ret | FRA; 10 | GBR; Ret | GER; Ret | HUN; 13 | BEL; 14 | ITA; Ret | POR; 6 | ESP; 10 | JPN; Ret | AUS; DNQ | 25th | 2 |

^{†} 1st place in the Jim Clark Trophy, for naturally aspirated cars.

=== Complete British Saloon / Touring Car Championship results ===
(key) (Races in bold indicate pole position – 1983 in class) (Races in italics indicate fastest lap – 1 point awarded 1983 all races, 1983 in class)

| Year | Team | Car | Class | 1 | 2 | 3 | 4 | 5 | 6 | 7 | 8 | 9 | 10 | 11 | 12 | 13 | 14 | 15 | DC | Pts | Class |
|---|---|---|---|---|---|---|---|---|---|---|---|---|---|---|---|---|---|---|---|---|---|
| 1983 | Cheylesmore BMW Motorsport | BMW 635CSi | A | SIL | OUL | THR | BRH | THR | SIL | DON | SIL | DON | BRH | SIL ovr:5 cls:5 | | | | | 30th | 2 | 14th |
| 1991 | BMW Team Finance | BMW M3 | | SIL; 7 | SNE; Ret | DON; Ret | THR; 6 | SIL; 11^{1} | BRH; 6 | SIL; 5 | DON; 4 | DON; 3 | OUL; 5 | BRH; 7 | BRH; 6 | DON; Ret | **THR**; 2 | SIL; 21 | 7th | 66 | |

1. – Race was stopped due to heavy rain. No points were awarded.

=== Complete European Touring Car Championship results ===
(key) (Races in bold indicate pole position) (Races in italics indicate fastest lap)

| Year | Team | Car | 1 | 2 | 3 | 4 | 5 | 6 | 7 | 8 | 9 | 10 | 11 | 12 | DC | Pts |
|---|---|---|---|---|---|---|---|---|---|---|---|---|---|---|---|---|
| 1981 | (United Kingdom) **GTI Engineering** | Audi 80 GTE | MNZ | VAL | DON | SAL | BRN | PER | SIL; 8† | ZOL | | | | | NC | 0 |
| 1982 | (Belgium) **Bastos Juma Racing** | BMW 528i | MNZ | VAL | DON | PER | MUG | BRN | SAL | NUR | SPA | SIL; 18 | ZOL | | NC | 0 |
| 1983 | (United Kingdom) **Autosport & Design** | BMW 635CSi | MNZ | VAL | DON | PER | MUG | BRN | ZEL | NUR | SAL | SPA | SIL; 2† | ZOL | NC | 0 |
| 1988 | (United Kingdom) **Kaliber Racing** | Ford Sierra RS500 | MNZ | DON | EST | JAR | DIJ | VAL | NÜR | SPA | ZOL | SIL; 6† | NOG | | NC | 0 |

† Not eligible for points.

=== Complete 24 Hours of Le Mans results ===
| Year | Team | Co-Drivers | Car | Class | Laps | Pos. | Class Pos. |
|---|---|---|---|---|---|---|---|
| 1983 | (United Kingdom) Canon Racing (United Kingdom) GTi Engineering | (Netherlands) Jan Lammers (United Kingdom) Richard Lloyd | Porsche 956 | C | 339 | 8th | 8th |
| 1984 | (United Kingdom) GTi Engineering | (Netherlands) Jan Lammers | Porsche 956 | C1 | 239 | DNF | DNF |
| 1985 | (United Kingdom) Richard Lloyd Racing | (United Kingdom) James Weaver (United Kingdom) Richard Lloyd | Porsche 956 GTi | C1 | 371 | **2nd** | **2nd** |
| 1987 | (United Kingdom) Liqui Moly Equipe | (United Kingdom) James Weaver (United States) Price Cobb | Porsche 962C GTi | C1 | 112 | DNF | DNF |
| 1990 | (Germany) Joest Porsche Racing | (France) Bob Wollek (France) Philippe Alliot | Porsche 962C | C1 | – | DNS | DNS |
| 1991 | (Germany) Team Sauber Mercedes | (Sweden) Stanley Dickens (Denmark) Kurt Thiim | Mercedes-Benz C11 | C1 | 223 | DNF | DNF |

Sporting positions
| Preceded by Stefan Johansson | British Formula Three Champion; 1981 | Succeeded by Tommy Byrne |
| Preceded by Corrado Fabi | European Formula Two; Champion; 1983 | Succeeded by Mike Thackwell |
Awards
| Preceded by John Watson | Autosport; British Competition Driver of the Year; 1983 | Succeeded by Derek Bell |
| Preceded by Nigel Mansell | Autosport; British Competition Driver of the Year; 1987 | Succeeded by Martin Brundle |
