= 1985 1000 km of Brands Hatch =

Layout of the Brands Hatch (1976-1987)

The 1985 1000 km Brands Hatch was the eighth round of the 1985 World Endurance Championship. It took place at Brands Hatch, United Kingdom on September 22, 1985.

As a non-points race for the Teams Championship, and amid concerns over the design of the Porsche 956 in the wake of the death of Stefan Bellof three weeks prior, every Porsche customer team chose not to enter the event, leaving just the factory Rothmans team as the only Porsche entrant

== Official results ==
Class winners in bold. Cars failing to complete 75% of the winner's distance marked as Not Classified (NC).

Pos	Class	No	Team	Drivers	Chassis	Tyre	Laps
Pos	Class	No	Team	Drivers	Engine	Tyre	Laps
1	**C1**	**2**	**(Germany) Rothmans Porsche**	**(Germany) Hans-Joachim Stuck (United Kingdom) Derek Bell**	**Porsche 962C**	D	**238**
1	**C1**	**2**	**(Germany) Rothmans Porsche**	**(Germany) Hans-Joachim Stuck (United Kingdom) Derek Bell**	**Porsche Type-935 2.6 L Turbo Flat-6**	D	**238**
2	C1	1	(Germany) Rothmans Porsche	(Germany) Jochen Mass (Belgium) Jacky Ickx	Porsche 962C	D	238
2	C1	1	(Germany) Rothmans Porsche	(Germany) Jochen Mass (Belgium) Jacky Ickx	Porsche Type-935 2.6 L Turbo Flat-6	D	238
3	C1	5	(Italy) Martini Racing	(Italy) Mauro Baldi (France) Bob Wollek (Italy) Andrea de Cesaris	Lancia LC2	MI	237
3	C1	5	(Italy) Martini Racing	(Italy) Mauro Baldi (France) Bob Wollek (Italy) Andrea de Cesaris	Ferrari 308C 3.0 L Turbo V8	MI	237
4	C1	4	(Italy) Martini Racing	(Italy) Riccardo Patrese (Italy) Alessandro Nannini	Lancia LC2	MI	233
4	C1	4	(Italy) Martini Racing	(Italy) Riccardo Patrese (Italy) Alessandro Nannini	Ferrari 308C 3.0 L Turbo V8	MI	233
5	C1	3	(Germany) Rothmans Porsche	(United States) Al Holbert (Australia) Vern Schuppan	Porsche 956 PDK	D	224
5	C1	3	(Germany) Rothmans Porsche	(United States) Al Holbert (Australia) Vern Schuppan	Porsche Type-935 2.6 L Turbo Flat-6	D	224
6	**C2**	**79**	**(United Kingdom) Ecurie Ecosse**	**(United Kingdom) Mike Wilds (United Kingdom) Ray Mallock**	**Ecosse C285**	A	**219**
6	**C2**	**79**	**(United Kingdom) Ecurie Ecosse**	**(United Kingdom) Mike Wilds (United Kingdom) Ray Mallock**	**Ford Cosworth DFL 3.3 L V8**	A	**219**
7	C1	34	(United Kingdom) Cosmik Racing	(United Kingdom) Divina Galica (Greece) Costas Los (Sweden) Anders Olofsson	March 84G	Y	211
7	C1	34	(United Kingdom) Cosmik Racing	(United Kingdom) Divina Galica (Greece) Costas Los (Sweden) Anders Olofsson	Porsche Type-956 2.6 L Turbo Flat-6	Y	211
8	C2	80	(Italy) Carma F.F.	(Italy) Carlo Facetti (Italy) Martino Finotto (Italy) Almo Coppelli	Alba AR6	A	208
8	C2	80	(Italy) Carma F.F.	(Italy) Carlo Facetti (Italy) Martino Finotto (Italy) Almo Coppelli	Carma FF 1.9 L Turbo I4	A	208
9	C2	93	(France) Automobiles Louis Descartes	(France) Louis Descartes (France) Jacques Heuclin	ALD 01	A	193
9	C2	93	(France) Automobiles Louis Descartes	(France) Louis Descartes (France) Jacques Heuclin	BMW M88 3.5 L I6	A	193
10	C2	75	(United Kingdom) ADA Engineering	(United Kingdom) Nick Adams (United Kingdom) Ian Harrower (United Kingdom) Ian Taylor	Gebhardt JC843	A	192
10	C2	75	(United Kingdom) ADA Engineering	(United Kingdom) Nick Adams (United Kingdom) Ian Harrower (United Kingdom) Ian Taylor	Ford Cosworth DFL 3.3 L V8	A	192
11	**B**	**151**	**(Germany) Helmut Gall**	**(Germany) Helmut Gall (Germany) Edgar Dören**	**BMW M1**	D	**191**
11	**B**	**151**	**(Germany) Helmut Gall**	**(Germany) Helmut Gall (Germany) Edgar Dören**	**BMW M88 3.5 L I6**	D	**191**
12 NC	C2	98	(United Kingdom) Roy Baker Promotions	(United Kingdom) Paul Smith (United Kingdom) Mike Kimpton (United Kingdom) Dudley Wood	Tiga GC285	A	149
12 NC	C2	98	(United Kingdom) Roy Baker Promotions	(United Kingdom) Paul Smith (United Kingdom) Mike Kimpton (United Kingdom) Dudley Wood	Ford Cosworth BDT 1.8 L Turbo I4	A	149
13 DNF	C2	95	(France) Roland Bassaler	(France) Roland Bassaler (France) Dominique Lacaud	Sauber SHS C6	A	156
13 DNF	C2	95	(France) Roland Bassaler	(France) Roland Bassaler (France) Dominique Lacaud	BMW M88 3.5 L I6	A	156
14 DNF	C2	107	(France) Jean-Claude Ferrarin	(France) Jean-Claude Ferrarin (France) Lucien Rossiaud	Isolia 001	A	137
14 DNF	C2	107	(France) Jean-Claude Ferrarin	(France) Jean-Claude Ferrarin (France) Lucien Rossiaud	BMW M12 2.0 L I4	A	137
15 DNF	C2	90	Jens Winther Denmark	(Denmark) Jens Winther (United Kingdom) David Mercer	URD C83	A	121
15 DNF	C2	90	Jens Winther Denmark	(Denmark) Jens Winther (United Kingdom) David Mercer	BMW M88 3.5 L I6	A	121
16 DNF	C2	82	(Italy) Grifo Autoracing	(Italy) Pasquale Barberio (Italy) Maurizio Gellini (Switzerland) Jean-Pierre Frey	Alba AR3	D	79
16 DNF	C2	82	(Italy) Grifo Autoracing	(Italy) Pasquale Barberio (Italy) Maurizio Gellini (Switzerland) Jean-Pierre Frey	Ford Cosworth DFL 3.3 L V8	D	79
17 DNF	C1	52	(United Kingdom) TWR Jaguar	(Germany) Hans Heyer (Netherlands) Jan Lammers	Jaguar XJR-6	D	77
17 DNF	C1	52	(United Kingdom) TWR Jaguar	(Germany) Hans Heyer (Netherlands) Jan Lammers	Jaguar 6.2 L V12	D	77
18 DNF	C2	88	(United Kingdom) Ark Racing	(United Kingdom) David Andrews (United Kingdom) Max Payne (United Kingdom) Chris Ashmore	Ceekar 83J	A	75
18 DNF	C2	88	(United Kingdom) Ark Racing	(United Kingdom) David Andrews (United Kingdom) Max Payne (United Kingdom) Chris Ashmore	Ford Cosworth BDX 2.0 L I4	A	75
19 DNF	C1	66	(United Kingdom) EMKA Productions Ltd.	(United Kingdom) Tiff Needell (United Kingdom) Steve O'Rourke (Republic of Ireland) Mark Galvin	EMKA C83	D	74
19 DNF	C1	66	(United Kingdom) EMKA Productions Ltd.	(United Kingdom) Tiff Needell (United Kingdom) Steve O'Rourke (Republic of Ireland) Mark Galvin	Aston Martin-Tickford 5.3 L V8	D	74
20 DNF	C1	23	Cheetah Automobiles Switzerland	(Belgium) Bernard de Dryver (United Kingdom) John Brindley (Belgium) Hervé Regout	Cheetah G604	D	71
20 DNF	C1	23	Cheetah Automobiles Switzerland	(Belgium) Bernard de Dryver (United Kingdom) John Brindley (Belgium) Hervé Regout	Aston Martin-Tickford 5.3 L V8	D	71
21 DNF	C2	99	(United Kingdom) Roy Baker Promotions	(United Kingdom) Will Hoy (United Kingdom) Duncan Bain (United Kingdom) Mike Catlow	Tiga GC284	A	70
21 DNF	C2	99	(United Kingdom) Roy Baker Promotions	(United Kingdom) Will Hoy (United Kingdom) Duncan Bain (United Kingdom) Mike Catlow	Ford Cosworth BDT 1.8 L Turbo I4	A	70
22 DNF	C1	16	(United Kingdom) RC Racing	(United Kingdom) David Leslie (United Kingdom) Richard Cleare	Kremer CK5	D	59
22 DNF	C1	16	(United Kingdom) RC Racing	(United Kingdom) David Leslie (United Kingdom) Richard Cleare	Porsche Type-935 2.6 L Turbo Flat-6	D	59
23 DNF	C2	54	(United Kingdom) Spice Engineering	(United Kingdom) Tim Lee-Davey (Australia) Neil Crang	Tiga GC84	D	57
23 DNF	C2	54	(United Kingdom) Spice Engineering	(United Kingdom) Tim Lee-Davey (Australia) Neil Crang	Ford Cosworth DFL 3.3 L V8	D	57
24 DNF	C2	100	(United Kingdom) Chevron Racing (United Kingdom) John Barlett Racing	(United Kingdom) John Sheldon (Sweden) Stanley Dickens (Morocco) Max Cohen-Olivar	Chevron B62	A	24
24 DNF	C2	100	(United Kingdom) Chevron Racing (United Kingdom) John Barlett Racing	(United Kingdom) John Sheldon (Sweden) Stanley Dickens (Morocco) Max Cohen-Olivar	Ford Cosworth DFL 3.3 L V8	A	24
25 DNF	C1	51	(United Kingdom) TWR Jaguar	(France) Jean-Louis Schlesser (Australia) Alan Jones	Jaguar XJR-6	D	20
25 DNF	C1	51	(United Kingdom) TWR Jaguar	(France) Jean-Louis Schlesser (Australia) Alan Jones	Jaguar 6.2 L V12	D	20
26 DNF	C2	70	(United Kingdom) Spice Engineering	(United Kingdom) Gordon Spice (United Kingdom) Ray Bellm	Spice-Tiga GC85	A	12
26 DNF	C2	70	(United Kingdom) Spice Engineering	(United Kingdom) Gordon Spice (United Kingdom) Ray Bellm	Ford Cosworth DFL 3.3 L V8	A	12

== Statistics ==
- Pole Position - #4 Martini Racing - 1:14.66
- Fastest Lap - #5 Martini Racing - 1:19.11
- Average Speed - 179.600 km/h

World Sportscar Championship
Previous race: 1985 1000 km of Spa	1985 season	Next race: 1985 1000 km of Fuji
