= 1985 1000 km of Hockenheim =

Layout of the Hockenheimring (1982-1991)

The 1985 duschfrisch Trophy ADAC 1000 km was the fifth round of the 1985 World Endurance Championship. It took place at the Hockenheimring, West Germany on July 14, 1985.

== Official results ==
Class winners are in bold. Cars failing to complete 75% of the winner's distance marked as Not Classified (NC).

Pos	Class	No	Team	Drivers	Chassis	Tyre	Laps
Pos	Class	No	Team	Drivers	Engine	Tyre	Laps
1	**C1**	**2**	**(Germany) Rothmans Porsche**	**(Germany) Hans-Joachim Stuck (United Kingdom) Derek Bell**	**Porsche 962C**	**D**	**147**
1	**C1**	**2**	**(Germany) Rothmans Porsche**	**(Germany) Hans-Joachim Stuck (United Kingdom) Derek Bell**	**Porsche Type-935 2.6 L Turbo Flat-6**	**D**	**147**
2	C1	18	(Switzerland) Brun Motorsport	(Argentina) Oscar Larrauri (Italy) Massimo Sigala	Porsche 956	**D**	147
2	C1	18	(Switzerland) Brun Motorsport	(Argentina) Oscar Larrauri (Italy) Massimo Sigala	Porsche Type-935 2.6 L Turbo Flat-6	**D**	147
3	C1	7	(Germany) Joest Racing	(Germany) Klaus Ludwig (Italy) Paolo Barilla	Porsche 956	**D**	145
3	C1	7	(Germany) Joest Racing	(Germany) Klaus Ludwig (Italy) Paolo Barilla	Porsche Type-935 2.6 L Turbo Flat-6	**D**	145
4	C1	5	(Italy) Martini Racing	(Italy) Mauro Baldi (France) Bob Wollek	Lancia LC2	**MI**	145
4	C1	5	(Italy) Martini Racing	(Italy) Mauro Baldi (France) Bob Wollek	Ferrari 308C 3.0 L Turbo V8	**MI**	145
5	C1	14	(United Kingdom) Richard Lloyd Racing	(United Kingdom) Jonathan Palmer (United Kingdom) David Hobbs	Porsche 956 GTi	**G**	143
5	C1	14	(United Kingdom) Richard Lloyd Racing	(United Kingdom) Jonathan Palmer (United Kingdom) David Hobbs	Porsche Type-935 2.6 L Turbo Flat-6	**G**	143
6	C1	20	(Switzerland) Brun Motorsport	(Switzerland) Walter Brun (Austria) Gerhard Berger	Porsche 956	**D**	142
6	C1	20	(Switzerland) Brun Motorsport	(Switzerland) Walter Brun (Austria) Gerhard Berger	Porsche Type-935 2.6 L Turbo Flat-6	**D**	142
7	C1	26	(Germany) Obermaier Racing Team	(Germany) Jürgen Lässig (Spain) Jesús Pareja (Belgium) Hervé Regout	Porsche 956	**G**	136
7	C1	26	(Germany) Obermaier Racing Team	(Germany) Jürgen Lässig (Spain) Jesús Pareja (Belgium) Hervé Regout	Porsche Type-935 2.6 L Turbo Flat-6	**G**	136
8	**C2**	**79**	**(United Kingdom) Ecurie Ecosse**	**(United Kingdom) Ray Mallock (United Kingdom) Mike Wilds (United Kingdom) David Leslie**	**Ecosse C285**	**A**	**134**
8	**C2**	**79**	**(United Kingdom) Ecurie Ecosse**	**(United Kingdom) Ray Mallock (United Kingdom) Mike Wilds (United Kingdom) David Leslie**	**Ford Cosworth DFV 3.0 L V8**	**A**	**134**
9	C2	70	(United Kingdom) Spice Engineering	(United Kingdom) Gordon Spice (United Kingdom) Ray Bellm	Spice-Tiga GC85	**A**	132
9	C2	70	(United Kingdom) Spice Engineering	(United Kingdom) Gordon Spice (United Kingdom) Ray Bellm	Ford Cosworth DFL 3.3 L V8	**A**	132
10	C2	80	(Italy) Carma F.F.	(Italy) Carlo Facetti (Italy) Martino Finotto (Italy) Lucio Cesario	Alba AR6	**A**	131
10	C2	80	(Italy) Carma F.F.	(Italy) Carlo Facetti (Italy) Martino Finotto (Italy) Lucio Cesario	Carma FF 1.9 L Turbo I4	**A**	131
11	**B**	**151**	**(Germany) Helmut Gall**	**(Germany) Helmut Gall (Germany) Uwe Reich (Germany) Edgar Dören**	**BMW M1**	**D**	**125**
11	**B**	**151**	**(Germany) Helmut Gall**	**(Germany) Helmut Gall (Germany) Uwe Reich (Germany) Edgar Dören**	**BMW M88 3.5 L I6**	**D**	**125**
12	B	153	(Germany) Bauerle Farben Team	(Germany) Rolf Göring (Germany) Michael Krankenberg (Switzerland) Claude Haldi	BMW M1	**D**	122
12	B	153	(Germany) Bauerle Farben Team	(Germany) Rolf Göring (Germany) Michael Krankenberg (Switzerland) Claude Haldi	BMW M88 3.5 L I6	**D**	122
13	C2	88	(United Kingdom) Ark Racing	(United Kingdom) David Andrews (United Kingdom) Max Payne	Ceekar 83J	**A**	119
13	C2	88	(United Kingdom) Ark Racing	(United Kingdom) David Andrews (United Kingdom) Max Payne	Ford Cosworth BDX 2.0 L I4	**A**	119
14	C2	90	Jens Winther Denmark	(Denmark) Jens Winther (United Kingdom) David Mercer (Republic of Ireland) Martin Birrane	URD C83	**A**	118
14	C2	90	Jens Winther Denmark	(Denmark) Jens Winther (United Kingdom) David Mercer (Republic of Ireland) Martin Birrane	BMW M88 3.5 L I6	**A**	118
15	B	158	(Switzerland) Vogelsung Automobile GmbH	(Germany) Harald Grohs (Germany) Kurt König	BMW M1	**A**	109
15	B	158	(Switzerland) Vogelsung Automobile GmbH	(Germany) Harald Grohs (Germany) Kurt König	BMW M88 3.5 L I6	**A**	109
16	C2	100	(United Kingdom) Chevron Racing (United Kingdom) John Barlett Racing	(United Kingdom) Richard Jones (United Kingdom) Robin Smith (Morocco) Max Cohen-Olivar	Chevron B62	**A**	96
16	C2	100	(United Kingdom) Chevron Racing (United Kingdom) John Barlett Racing	(United Kingdom) Richard Jones (United Kingdom) Robin Smith (Morocco) Max Cohen-Olivar	Ford Cosworth DFL 3.3 L V8	**A**	96
17 NC	C1	46	(Germany) Kumsan Tiger Team (Germany) Derichs Rennwagen	(Germany) Harald Becker (Germany) Jan Thoelke	Zakspeed C1/8	**G**	77
17 NC	C1	46	(Germany) Kumsan Tiger Team (Germany) Derichs Rennwagen	(Germany) Harald Becker (Germany) Jan Thoelke	Ford Cosworth DFL 4.0 L V8	**G**	77
18 NC	C2	99	(United Kingdom) Roy Baker Promotions	(United Kingdom) Mike Kimpton (United Kingdom) Roy Baker (United Kingdom) Paul Smith	Tiga GC284	**A**	72
18 NC	C2	99	(United Kingdom) Roy Baker Promotions	(United Kingdom) Mike Kimpton (United Kingdom) Roy Baker (United Kingdom) Paul Smith	Ford Cosworth BDT 1.8 L Turbo I4	**A**	72
19 DNF	C1	4	(Italy) Martini Racing	(Italy) Riccardo Patrese (Italy) Alessandro Nannini	Lancia LC2	**MI**	143
19 DNF	C1	4	(Italy) Martini Racing	(Italy) Riccardo Patrese (Italy) Alessandro Nannini	Ferrari 308C 3.0 L Turbo V8	**MI**	143
20 DNF	C1	1	(Germany) Rothmans Porsche	(Germany) Jochen Mass (Belgium) Jacky Ickx	Porsche 962C	**D**	122
20 DNF	C1	1	(Germany) Rothmans Porsche	(Germany) Jochen Mass (Belgium) Jacky Ickx	Porsche Type-935 2.6 L Turbo Flat-6	**D**	122
21 DNF	C1	34	(United Kingdom) Cosmik Racing	(Germany) Christian Danner (Greece) Costas Los (Sweden) Mikael Nabrink	March 84G	**Y**	118
21 DNF	C1	34	(United Kingdom) Cosmik Racing	(Germany) Christian Danner (Greece) Costas Los (Sweden) Mikael Nabrink	Porsche Type-956 2.6 L Turbo Flat-6	**Y**	118
22 DNF	C1	19	(Switzerland) Brun Motorsport	(Germany) Stefan Bellof (Belgium) Thierry Boutsen	Porsche 956B	**D**	99
22 DNF	C1	19	(Switzerland) Brun Motorsport	(Germany) Stefan Bellof (Belgium) Thierry Boutsen	Porsche Type-935 2.6 L Turbo Flat-6	**D**	99
23 DNF	C1	9	(Germany) Porsche Kremer Racing	(Germany) Manfred Winkelhock (Switzerland) Marc Surer	Porsche 962C	**G**	86
23 DNF	C1	9	(Germany) Porsche Kremer Racing	(Germany) Manfred Winkelhock (Switzerland) Marc Surer	Porsche Type-935 2.6 L Turbo Flat-6	**G**	86
24 DNF	C2	81	(Italy) Carma F.F.	(Switzerland) Marco Vanoli (Switzerland) Jean-Pierre Frey	Alba AR2	**A**	81
24 DNF	C2	81	(Italy) Carma F.F.	(Switzerland) Marco Vanoli (Switzerland) Jean-Pierre Frey	Carma FF 1.9 L Turbo I4	**A**	81
25 DNF	C2	72	(Germany) Gebhardt Motorsport	(Germany) Günter Gebhardt (Austria) Jo Gartner (Czechoslovakia) Miroslav Adámek	Gebhardt JC843	**A**	75
25 DNF	C2	72	(Germany) Gebhardt Motorsport	(Germany) Günter Gebhardt (Austria) Jo Gartner (Czechoslovakia) Miroslav Adámek	Ford Cosworth DFV 3.0 L V8	**A**	75
26 DNF	C2	105	(Denmark) Jens Nakjaer	(Denmark) Jens Nakjaer (Denmark) Holger Knudsen	Nakjaer	**A**	59
26 DNF	C2	105	(Denmark) Jens Nakjaer	(Denmark) Jens Nakjaer (Denmark) Holger Knudsen	BMW 3.2 L I6	**A**	59
27 DNF	C1	8	(Germany) Joest Racing	(Germany) Volker Weidler (Germany) "John Winter" (Austria) Walter Lechner	Porsche 956	**D**	55
27 DNF	C1	8	(Germany) Joest Racing	(Germany) Volker Weidler (Germany) "John Winter" (Austria) Walter Lechner	Porsche Type-935 2.6 L Turbo Flat-6	**D**	55
28 DNF	C1	10	(Germany) Porsche Kremer Racing	(Germany) Klaus Niedzwiedz (Netherlands) Kees Kroesemeijer	Porsche 956	**G**	55
28 DNF	C1	10	(Germany) Porsche Kremer Racing	(Germany) Klaus Niedzwiedz (Netherlands) Kees Kroesemeijer	Porsche Type-935 2.6 L Turbo Flat-6	**G**	55
29 DNF	C2	98	(United Kingdom) Roy Baker Promotions	(Denmark) Thorkild Thyrring (United Kingdom) Will Hoy	Tiga GC284	**A**	54
29 DNF	C2	98	(United Kingdom) Roy Baker Promotions	(Denmark) Thorkild Thyrring (United Kingdom) Will Hoy	Ford Cosworth BDT 1.8 L Turbo I4	**A**	54
30 DNF	C2	104	(France) Ecurie Blanchet Locatop	(France) Hubert Striebig (France) Michel Dubois (France) Noël del Bello	Rondeau M379C	**A**	38
30 DNF	C2	104	(France) Ecurie Blanchet Locatop	(France) Hubert Striebig (France) Michel Dubois (France) Noël del Bello	Ford Cosworth DFV 3.0 L V8	**A**	38
31 DNF	C2	82	(Italy) Grifo Autoracing	(Italy) Paolo Giangrossi (Italy) Pasquale Barberio (Italy) Maurizio Gellini	Alba AR3	**D**	36
31 DNF	C2	82	(Italy) Grifo Autoracing	(Italy) Paolo Giangrossi (Italy) Pasquale Barberio (Italy) Maurizio Gellini	Ford Cosworth DFL 3.3 L V8	**D**	36
32 DNF	GTX	171	(Italy) "Victor"	(Italy) "Victor" (Italy) Luigi Taverna (Switzerland) Angelo Pallavicini	Porsche 935	?	31
32 DNF	GTX	171	(Italy) "Victor"	(Italy) "Victor" (Italy) Luigi Taverna (Switzerland) Angelo Pallavicini	Porsche Type-930 3.2 L Turbo Flat-6	?	31
33 DNF	C2	74	(Germany) Gebhardt Motorsport	(Germany) Manuel Reuter (Germany) Frank Jelinski (Canada) John Graham	Gebhardt JC853	**A**	24
33 DNF	C2	74	(Germany) Gebhardt Motorsport	(Germany) Manuel Reuter (Germany) Frank Jelinski (Canada) John Graham	Ford Cosworth DFV 3.0 L V8	**A**	24
34 DNF	C2	93	(France) Automobiles Louis Descartes	(France) Louis Descartes (France) Jacques Heuclin	ALD 01	**A**	21
34 DNF	C2	93	(France) Automobiles Louis Descartes	(France) Louis Descartes (France) Jacques Heuclin	BMW M88 3.5 L I6	**A**	21
35 DNF	C1	23	Cheetah Automobiles Switzerland	(United Kingdom) John Cooper (United Kingdom) Tiff Needell	Cheetah G604	**D**	9
35 DNF	C1	23	Cheetah Automobiles Switzerland	(United Kingdom) John Cooper (United Kingdom) Tiff Needell	Aston Martin-Tickford 5.3 L V8	**D**	9
36 DNF	C2	102	(Germany) Motorsportclub Wassenburg	(Germany) Martin Wagenstetter (Germany) Kurt Hild	Lotec C302	**D**	9
36 DNF	C2	102	(Germany) Motorsportclub Wassenburg	(Germany) Martin Wagenstetter (Germany) Kurt Hild	Ford Cosworth DFV 3.0 L V8	**D**	9
DNQ	C2	97	(Sweden) Strandell Motors	(Sweden) Stanley Dickens (Norway) Martin Schanche	Strandell 85	**A**	-
DNQ	C2	97	(Sweden) Strandell Motors	(Sweden) Stanley Dickens (Norway) Martin Schanche	Porsche Type-934 3.3 L Turbo Flat-6	**A**	-

== Statistics ==
- Pole Position - #1 Rothmans Porsche - 1:55.18
- Fastest Lap - #19 Brun Motorsport - 2:00.66
- Average Speed - 185.607 km/h

World Sportscar Championship
Previous race: 1985 24 Hours of Le Mans	1985 season	Next race: 1985 1000 km of Mosport
