= 1985 1000 km of Silverstone =

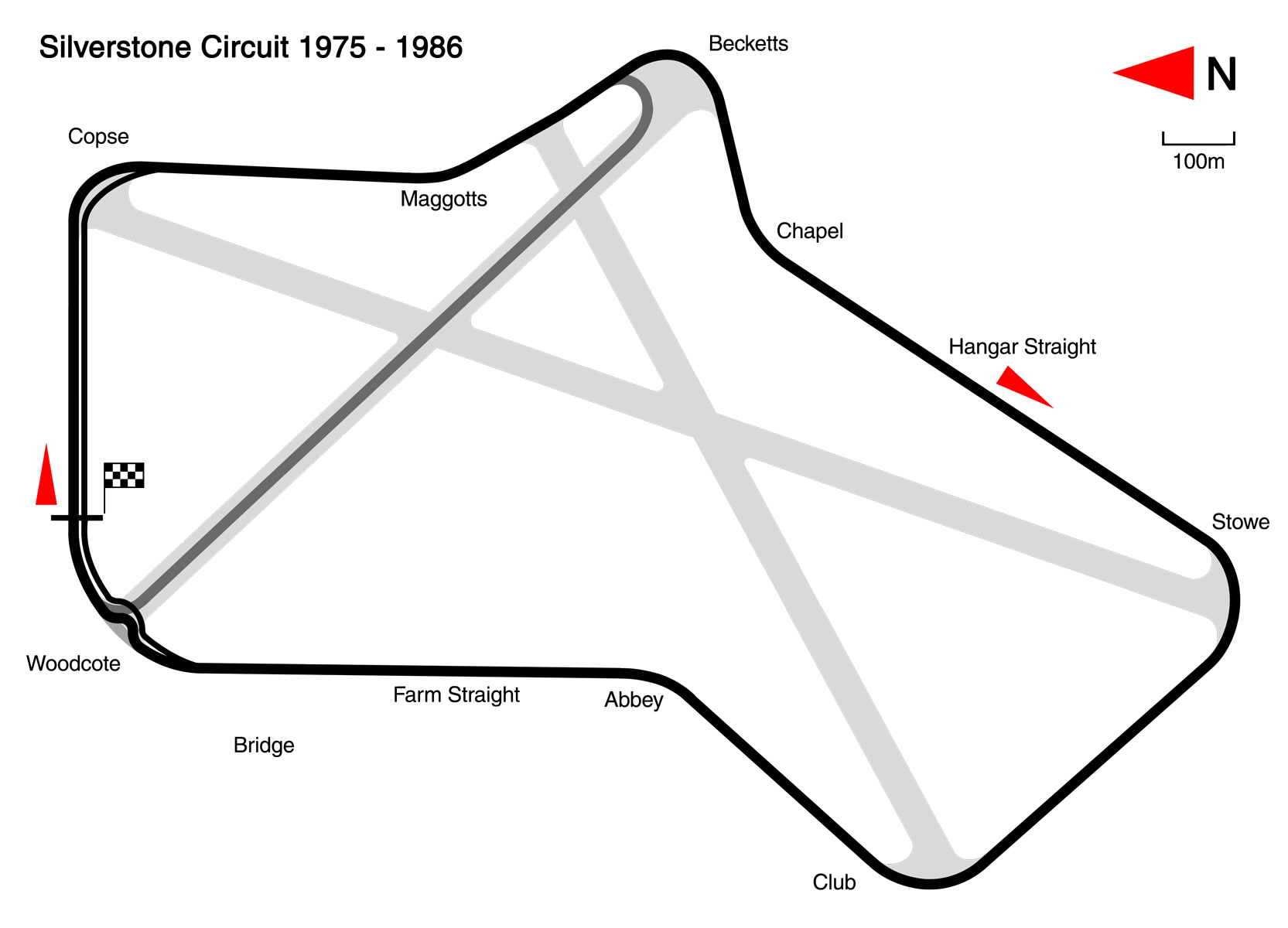
Map of the Silverstone Circuit (1975–1986)

The 1985 Silverstone 1000 km was the third round of the 1985 World Endurance Championship. It took place at the Silverstone Circuit, Great Britain on 12 May 1985.

== Official results ==
Class winners in bold. Cars failing to complete 75% of the winner's distance marked as Not Classified (NC).

Pos	Class	No	Team	Drivers	Chassis	Tyre	Laps
Pos	Class	No	Team	Drivers	Engine	Tyre	Laps
1	**C1**	**1**	**(Germany) Rothmans Porsche**	**(Germany) Jochen Mass (Belgium) Jacky Ickx**	**Porsche 962C**	D	**212**
1	**C1**	**1**	**(Germany) Rothmans Porsche**	**(Germany) Jochen Mass (Belgium) Jacky Ickx**	**Porsche Type-935 2.6 L Turbo Flat-6**	D	**212**
2	C1	2	(Germany) Rothmans Porsche	(Germany) Hans-Joachim Stuck (United Kingdom) Derek Bell	Porsche 956	D	211
2	C1	2	(Germany) Rothmans Porsche	(Germany) Hans-Joachim Stuck (United Kingdom) Derek Bell	Porsche Type-935 2.6 L Turbo Flat-6	D	211
3	C1	4	(Italy) Martini Racing	(Italy) Riccardo Patrese (Italy) Alessandro Nannini	Lancia LC2	MI	210
3	C1	4	(Italy) Martini Racing	(Italy) Riccardo Patrese (Italy) Alessandro Nannini	Ferrari 308C 3.0 L Turbo V8	MI	210
4	C1	10	(Germany) Porsche Kremer Racing	(Germany) Manfred Winkelhock (Switzerland) Marc Surer	Porsche 962C	G	210
4	C1	10	(Germany) Porsche Kremer Racing	(Germany) Manfred Winkelhock (Switzerland) Marc Surer	Porsche Type-935 2.6 L Turbo Flat-6	G	210
5	C1	14	(United Kingdom) Richard Lloyd Racing	(United Kingdom) Jonathan Palmer (Netherlands) Jan Lammers	Porsche 956 GTi	G	207
5	C1	14	(United Kingdom) Richard Lloyd Racing	(United Kingdom) Jonathan Palmer (Netherlands) Jan Lammers	Porsche Type-935 2.6 L Turbo Flat-6	G	207
6	C1	7	(Germany) New Man Joest Racing	(Germany) Klaus Ludwig (Italy) Paolo Barilla (France) Paul Belmondo	Porsche 956	D	206
6	C1	7	(Germany) New Man Joest Racing	(Germany) Klaus Ludwig (Italy) Paolo Barilla (France) Paul Belmondo	Porsche Type-935 2.6 L Turbo Flat-6	D	206
7	C1	26	(Germany) Obermaier Racing Team	(Germany) Jürgen Lässig (Spain) Jesús Pareja (Belgium) Hervé Regout	Porsche 956	G	204
7	C1	26	(Germany) Obermaier Racing Team	(Germany) Jürgen Lässig (Spain) Jesús Pareja (Belgium) Hervé Regout	Porsche Type-935 2.6 L Turbo Flat-6	G	204
8	C1	11	(Germany) Porsche Kremer Racing	(South Africa) Sarel van der Merwe (South Africa) George Fouché (Italy) Almo Coppelli	Porsche 956B	G	195
8	C1	11	(Germany) Porsche Kremer Racing	(South Africa) Sarel van der Merwe (South Africa) George Fouché (Italy) Almo Coppelli	Porsche Type-935 2.6 L Turbo Flat-6	G	195
9	**C2**	**79**	**(United Kingdom) Ecurie Ecosse**	**(United Kingdom) Ray Mallock (United Kingdom) Mike Wilds**	**Ecosse C285**	A	**193**
9	**C2**	**79**	**(United Kingdom) Ecurie Ecosse**	**(United Kingdom) Ray Mallock (United Kingdom) Mike Wilds**	**Ford Cosworth DFV 3.0 L V8**	A	**193**
10	C1	19	(Switzerland) Brun Motorsport	(Switzerland) Walter Brun (Belgium) Thierry Boutsen	Porsche 962C	D	193
10	C1	19	(Switzerland) Brun Motorsport	(Switzerland) Walter Brun (Belgium) Thierry Boutsen	Porsche Type-935 2.6 L Turbo Flat-6	D	193
11	C2	70	(United Kingdom) Spice Engineering	(United Kingdom) Gordon Spice (United Kingdom) Ray Bellm	Tiga-Spice GC85	A	189
11	C2	70	(United Kingdom) Spice Engineering	(United Kingdom) Gordon Spice (United Kingdom) Ray Bellm	Ford Cosworth DFL 3.3 L V8	A	189
12	C1	5	(Italy) Martini Racing	(Italy) Mauro Baldi (France) Bob Wollek	Lancia LC2	MI	188
12	C1	5	(Italy) Martini Racing	(Italy) Mauro Baldi (France) Bob Wollek	Ferrari 308C 3.0 L Turbo V8	MI	188
13	C2	97	(Sweden) Strandell Motors	(Sweden) Stanley Dickens (Norway) Martin Schanche	Strandell 85	A	176
13	C2	97	(Sweden) Strandell Motors	(Sweden) Stanley Dickens (Norway) Martin Schanche	Porsche Type-934 3.3 L Turbo Flat-6	A	176
14	C2	72	(Germany) Gebhardt Engineering	(United Kingdom) Nick Adams (Germany) Frank Jelinski (Canada) John Graham	Gebhardt JC853	A	174
14	C2	72	(Germany) Gebhardt Engineering	(United Kingdom) Nick Adams (Germany) Frank Jelinski (Canada) John Graham	Ford Cosworth DFV 3.0 L V8	A	174
15	C2	88	(United Kingdom) Arthur Hough Pressings (United Kingdom) Ark Racing	(United Kingdom) David Andrews (United Kingdom) Chris Ashmore (United Kingdom) Max Payne	Ceekar 83J	A	173
15	C2	88	(United Kingdom) Arthur Hough Pressings (United Kingdom) Ark Racing	(United Kingdom) David Andrews (United Kingdom) Chris Ashmore (United Kingdom) Max Payne	Ford Cosworth BDX 2.0 L I4	A	173
16	C2	86	(Japan) Mazdaspeed Co. Ltd.	(Japan) Yojiro Terada (Republic of Ireland) David Kennedy	Mazda 737C	D	173
16	C2	86	(Japan) Mazdaspeed Co. Ltd.	(Japan) Yojiro Terada (Republic of Ireland) David Kennedy	Mazda 13B 1.3 L 2-Rotor	D	173
17	C2	80	(Italy) Carma F.F.	(Italy) Carlo Facetti (Italy) Martino Finotto (Italy) Guido Daccò	Alba AR2	A	164
17	C2	80	(Italy) Carma F.F.	(Italy) Carlo Facetti (Italy) Martino Finotto (Italy) Guido Daccò	Carma FF 1.9 L Turbo I4	A	164
18	C2	81	(Italy) Carma F.F.	(Switzerland) Loris Kessel (Switzerland) Jean-Pierre Frey	Alba AR6	A	158
18	C2	81	(Italy) Carma F.F.	(Switzerland) Loris Kessel (Switzerland) Jean-Pierre Frey	Carma FF 1.9 L Turbo I4	A	158
19 DNF	C2	85	(Japan) Mazdaspeed Co. Ltd.	(Japan) Yoshimi Katayama (Japan) Takashi Yorino	Mazda 737C	D	174
19 DNF	C2	85	(Japan) Mazdaspeed Co. Ltd.	(Japan) Yoshimi Katayama (Japan) Takashi Yorino	Mazda 13B 1.3 L 2-Rotor	D	174
20 DNF	C1	18	(Switzerland) Brun Motorsport	(Argentina) Oscar Larrauri (Italy) Massimo Sigala	Porsche 956	D	172
20 DNF	C1	18	(Switzerland) Brun Motorsport	(Argentina) Oscar Larrauri (Italy) Massimo Sigala	Porsche Type-935 2.6 L Turbo Flat-6	D	172
21 DNF	C1	69	(United Kingdom) Richard Lloyd Racing	(United Kingdom) James Weaver (Australia) Vern Schuppan	Porsche 956	G	150
21 DNF	C1	69	(United Kingdom) Richard Lloyd Racing	(United Kingdom) James Weaver (Australia) Vern Schuppan	Porsche Type-935 2.6 L Turbo Flat-6	G	150
22 DNF	C2	75	(United Kingdom) ADA Engineering	(United Kingdom) Ian Harrower (Republic of Ireland) Mark Galvin (United States) Steve Earle	Gebhardt JC843	A	135
22 DNF	C2	75	(United Kingdom) ADA Engineering	(United Kingdom) Ian Harrower (Republic of Ireland) Mark Galvin (United States) Steve Earle	Ford Cosworth DFL 3.3 L V8	A	135
23 DNF	C1	33	(United Kingdom) John Fitzpatrick Racing	(Austria) Jo Gartner (United Kingdom) David Hobbs	Porsche 956B	Y	106
23 DNF	C1	33	(United Kingdom) John Fitzpatrick Racing	(Austria) Jo Gartner (United Kingdom) David Hobbs	Porsche Type-935 2.6 L Turbo Flat-6	Y	106
24 DNF	C2	90	Jens Winther Castrol Denmark	(Denmark) Jens Winther (United Kingdom) David Mercer	URD C83	A	75
24 DNF	C2	90	Jens Winther Castrol Denmark	(Denmark) Jens Winther (United Kingdom) David Mercer	BMW M88 3.5 L I6	A	75
25 DNF	C1	66	(United Kingdom) EMKA Productions Ltd.	(United Kingdom) Steve O'Rourke (United Kingdom) Tiff Needell (United Kingdom) Bob Evans	EMKA C84	D	70
25 DNF	C1	66	(United Kingdom) EMKA Productions Ltd.	(United Kingdom) Steve O'Rourke (United Kingdom) Tiff Needell (United Kingdom) Bob Evans	Aston Martin-Tickford 5.3 L V8	D	70
26 DNF	C1	55	(United Kingdom) John Fitzpatrick Racing	(United Kingdom) Dudley Wood (United Kingdom) Guy Edwards (Peru) Manuel López	Porsche 956	Y	37
26 DNF	C1	55	(United Kingdom) John Fitzpatrick Racing	(United Kingdom) Dudley Wood (United Kingdom) Guy Edwards (Peru) Manuel López	Porsche Type-935 2.6 L Turbo Flat-6	Y	37
27 DNF	C2	82	(Italy) Grifo Racing	(Italy) Paolo Giangrossi (Italy) Pasquale Barberio (Italy) Maurizio Gellini	Alba AR3	D	36
27 DNF	C2	82	(Italy) Grifo Racing	(Italy) Paolo Giangrossi (Italy) Pasquale Barberio (Italy) Maurizio Gellini	Ford Cosworth DFL 3.3 L V8	D	36
28 DNF	C1	23	Cheetah Automobiles Switzerland	(United Kingdom) John Cooper (United Kingdom) John Brindley	Cheetah G604	D	34
28 DNF	C1	23	Cheetah Automobiles Switzerland	(United Kingdom) John Cooper (United Kingdom) John Brindley	Aston Martin-Tickford 5.3 L V8	D	34
29 DNF	C2	67	(United Kingdom) Spice Engineering	(United Kingdom) Tim Lee-Davey (Australia) Neil Crang	Tiga GC84	A	28
29 DNF	C2	67	(United Kingdom) Spice Engineering	(United Kingdom) Tim Lee-Davey (Australia) Neil Crang	Ford Cosworth DFL 3.3 L V8	A	28
30 DNF	C2	98	(United Kingdom) Roy Baker Promotions	(Denmark) Thorkild Thyrring (United Kingdom) Will Hoy	Tiga GC284	A	14
30 DNF	C2	98	(United Kingdom) Roy Baker Promotions	(Denmark) Thorkild Thyrring (United Kingdom) Will Hoy	Ford Cosworth BDT 1.8 L Turbo I4	A	14
31 DNF	C1	31	(France) Primagaz Sovico	(France) Pierre-François Rousselot (France) Pierre Yver (France) Jean Rondeau	Rondeau M382	D	8
31 DNF	C1	31	(France) Primagaz Sovico	(France) Pierre-François Rousselot (France) Pierre Yver (France) Jean Rondeau	Ford Cosworth DFV 3.0 L V8	D	8

== Statistics ==
- Pole Position - #4 Martini Racing - 1:10.84
- Fastest Lap - #14 Richard Lloyd Racing - 1:15.96
- Average Speed - 204.115 km/h

World Sportscar Championship
Previous race: 1985 1000 km of Monza	1985 season	Next race: 1985 24 Hours of Le Mans
