= 1985 1000 km of Mugello =

Layout of the Mugello Circuit

The 1985 1000 km of Mugello was the opening round of the 1985 World Endurance Championship. It took place at the Mugello Circuit, Italy on April 14, 1985.

== Official results ==
Class winners in bold. Cars failing to complete 75% of the winner's distance marked as Not Classified (NC).

Pos	Class	No	Team	Drivers	Chassis	Tyre	Laps
Pos	Class	No	Team	Drivers	Engine	Tyre	Laps
1	**C1**	**1**	**(Germany) Rothmans Porsche**	**(Germany) Jochen Mass (Belgium) Jacky Ickx**	**Porsche 962C**	**D**	**190**
1	**C1**	**1**	**(Germany) Rothmans Porsche**	**(Germany) Jochen Mass (Belgium) Jacky Ickx**	**Porsche Type-935 2.6 L Turbo Flat-6**	**D**	**190**
2	C1	10	(Germany) Porsche Kremer Racing	(Germany) Manfred Winkelhock (Switzerland) Marc Surer	Porsche 962C	**G**	190
2	C1	10	(Germany) Porsche Kremer Racing	(Germany) Manfred Winkelhock (Switzerland) Marc Surer	Porsche Type-935 2.6 L Turbo Flat-6	**G**	190
3	C1	19	(Switzerland) Brun Motorsport	(Germany) Stefan Bellof (Belgium) Thierry Boutsen	Porsche 962C	**D**	189
3	C1	19	(Switzerland) Brun Motorsport	(Germany) Stefan Bellof (Belgium) Thierry Boutsen	Porsche Type-935 2.6 L Turbo Flat-6	**D**	189
4	C1	5	(Italy) Martini Racing	(Italy) Mauro Baldi (France) Bob Wollek	Lancia LC2	**MI**	186
4	C1	5	(Italy) Martini Racing	(Italy) Mauro Baldi (France) Bob Wollek	Ferrari 308C 3.0 L Turbo V8	**MI**	186
5	C1	11	(Germany) Porsche Kremer Racing	(Germany) Klaus Ludwig (South Africa) George Fouché (Italy) Gianni Mussato	Porsche 956B	**G**	184
5	C1	11	(Germany) Porsche Kremer Racing	(Germany) Klaus Ludwig (South Africa) George Fouché (Italy) Gianni Mussato	Porsche Type-935 2.6 L Turbo Flat-6	**G**	184
6	C1	26	(Germany) Obermaier Racing Team	(Germany) Jürgen Lässig (New Zealand) Mike Thackwell (Belgium) Hervé Regout	Porsche 956	**G**	179
6	C1	26	(Germany) Obermaier Racing Team	(Germany) Jürgen Lässig (New Zealand) Mike Thackwell (Belgium) Hervé Regout	Porsche Type-935 2.6 L Turbo Flat-6	**G**	179
7	**C2**	**70**	**(United Kingdom) Spice Engineering**	**(United Kingdom) Gordon Spice (United Kingdom) Ray Bellm**	**Tiga-Spice GC85**	**A**	**174**
7	**C2**	**70**	**(United Kingdom) Spice Engineering**	**(United Kingdom) Gordon Spice (United Kingdom) Ray Bellm**	**Ford Cosworth DFL 3.3 L V8**	**A**	**174**
8	C2	80	(Italy) Carma F.F.	(Italy) Carlo Facetti (Italy) Martino Finotto (Italy) Guido Daccò	Alba AR2	**A**	161
8	C2	80	(Italy) Carma F.F.	(Italy) Carlo Facetti (Italy) Martino Finotto (Italy) Guido Daccò	Carma FF 1.9 L Turbo I4	**A**	161
9	C2	90	Jens Winther Denmark	(Denmark) Jens Winther (Denmark) Lars-Viggo Jensen	URD C83	**A**	159
9	C2	90	Jens Winther Denmark	(Denmark) Jens Winther (Denmark) Lars-Viggo Jensen	BMW M88 3.5 L I6	**A**	159
10	**GTX**	**155**	**(Italy) "Victor"**	**(Italy) "Victor" (Italy) Livio Bertuzzi (Italy) Gianni Giudici**	**Porsche 935**	?	**158**
10	**GTX**	**155**	**(Italy) "Victor"**	**(Italy) "Victor" (Italy) Livio Bertuzzi (Italy) Gianni Giudici**	**Porsche Type-930 3.2 L Turbo Flat-6**	?	**158**
11	**B**	**151**	**(Germany) Helmut Gall**	**(Germany) Helmut Gall (Germany) Axel Felder**	**BMW M1**	**D**	**154**
11	**B**	**151**	**(Germany) Helmut Gall**	**(Germany) Helmut Gall (Germany) Axel Felder**	**BMW M88 3.5 L I6**	**D**	**154**
12	C2	88	(United Kingdom) Ark Racing	(United Kingdom) David Andrews (United Kingdom) Chris Ashmore (United Kingdom) Max Payne	Ceekar 83J	**A**	152
12	C2	88	(United Kingdom) Ark Racing	(United Kingdom) David Andrews (United Kingdom) Chris Ashmore (United Kingdom) Max Payne	Ford Cosworth BDX 2.0 L I4	**A**	152
13	C2	98	(United Kingdom) Roy Baker Promotions	(United Kingdom) Paul Smith (United Kingdom) Dudley Wood (United Kingdom) Jeremy Rossiter	Tiga GC284	**A**	135
13	C2	98	(United Kingdom) Roy Baker Promotions	(United Kingdom) Paul Smith (United Kingdom) Dudley Wood (United Kingdom) Jeremy Rossiter	Ford Cosworth BDT 1.8 L Turbo I4	**A**	135
14 DSQ^{†}	C1	2	(Germany) Rothmans Porsche	(Germany) Hans-Joachim Stuck (United Kingdom) Derek Bell	Porsche 962C	**D**	186
14 DSQ^{†}	C1	2	(Germany) Rothmans Porsche	(Germany) Hans-Joachim Stuck (United Kingdom) Derek Bell	Porsche Type-935 2.6 L Turbo Flat-6	**D**	186
15 DNF	C1	4	(Italy) Martini Racing	(Italy) Riccardo Patrese (Italy) Alessandro Nannini	Lancia LC2	**MI**	113
15 DNF	C1	4	(Italy) Martini Racing	(Italy) Riccardo Patrese (Italy) Alessandro Nannini	Ferrari 308C 3.0 L Turbo V8	**MI**	113
16 DNF	C1	18	(Switzerland) Brun Motorsport	(Argentina) Oscar Larrauri (Italy) Massimo Sigala	Porsche 956	**D**	101
16 DNF	C1	18	(Switzerland) Brun Motorsport	(Argentina) Oscar Larrauri (Italy) Massimo Sigala	Porsche Type-935 2.6 L Turbo Flat-6	**D**	101
17 DNF	C1	23	Cheetah Automobiles Switzerland	(Belgium) Bernard de Dryver (Italy) Gianfranco Brancatelli	Cheetah G604	**D**	20
17 DNF	C1	23	Cheetah Automobiles Switzerland	(Belgium) Bernard de Dryver (Italy) Gianfranco Brancatelli	Aston Martin-Tickford 5.3 L V8	**D**	20
DNS	C1	20	(Switzerland) Brun Motorsport	(Switzerland) Walter Brun (Germany) Leopold von Bayern	Porsche 956B	**D**	-
DNS	C1	20	(Switzerland) Brun Motorsport	(Switzerland) Walter Brun (Germany) Leopold von Bayern	Porsche Type-935 2.6 L Turbo Flat-6	**D**	-

† - #2 Rothmans Porsche was disqualified after it completed the final lap of the race too slowly.

== Statistics ==
- Pole Position - #4 Martini Racing - 1:39.07
- Fastest Lap - #4 Martini Racing - 1:45.79
- Average Speed - 166.152 km/h

World Sportscar Championship
Previous race: None	1985 season	Next race: 1985 1000 km of Monza
