= 1985 World Sportscar Championship =

Racing tournament

Seasons
- ← 1984 1986 →

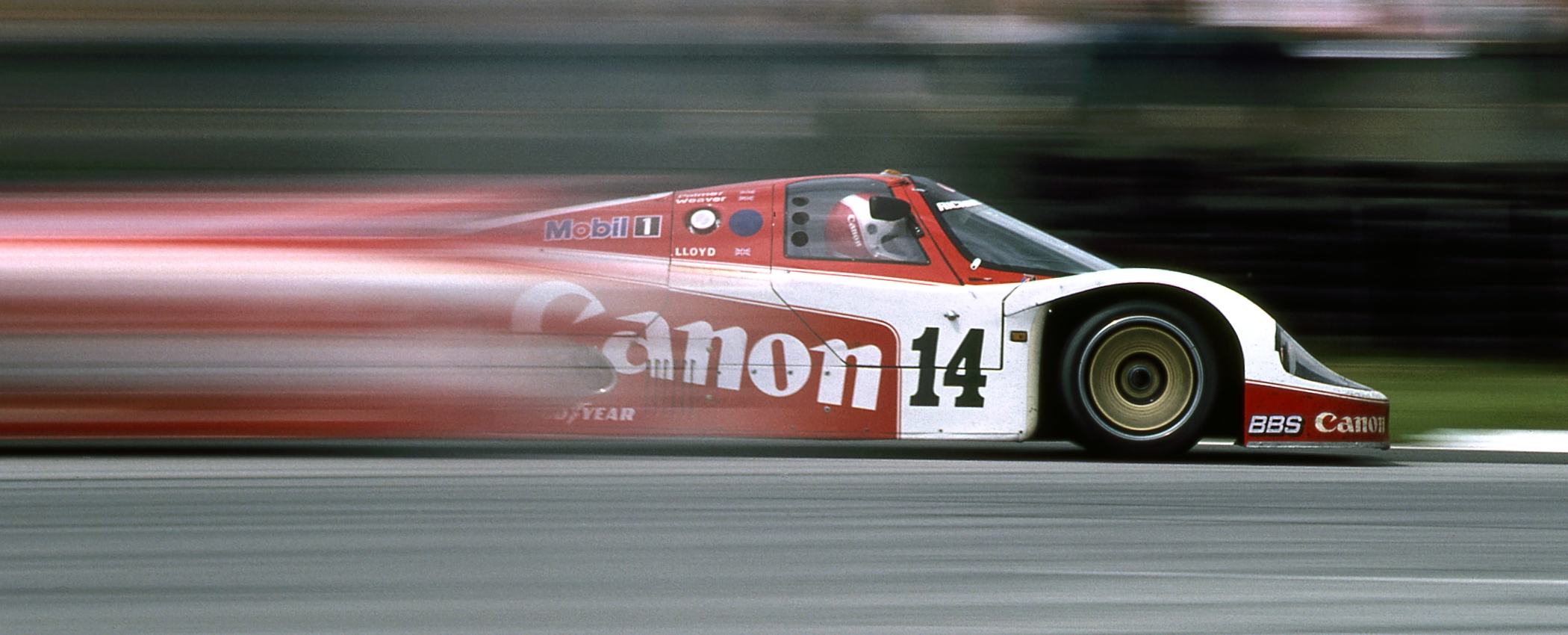
Richard Lloyd Racing Porsche 956 contesting the Le Mans round of the 1985 World Endurance Championship

The 1985 World Sportscar Championship season was the 33rd season of FIA World Sportscar Championship motor racing. It featured the 1985 World Endurance Championship which was contested over a series of races for Group C1 and Group C2 Prototypes, Group B GT Cars and IMSA GTP cars. The series ran from 14 April 1985 to 1 December 1985 and was composed of 10 races.

This year marked the introduction of Teams titles for outright, Group C2 and GT Cars, replacing the traditional Manufacturers awards. Outright and Group C2 Drivers titles were also awarded.

== Schedule ==
Rnd	Race	Circuit	Date
1	(Italy) 1000 km Mugello	Mugello Circuit	14 April
2	(Italy) Trofeo Filippo Caracciolo (1000km)^{†}	Autodromo Nazionale Monza	28 April
3	(United Kingdom) Silverstone 1000 Kilometres	Silverstone Circuit	12 May
4	(France) 24 Hours of Le Mans	Circuit de la Sarthe	15 June; 16 June
5	(Germany) Duschfrisch ADAC 1000 Kilometres	Hockenheimring	14 July
6	(Canada) Budweiser GT 1000 Kilometres	Mosport	11 August
7	(Belgium) 1000km of Spa	Circuit de Spa-Francorchamps	1 September
8	(United Kingdom) 1000 km of Brands Hatch^{†}	Brands Hatch	22 September
9	(Japan) Fuji 1000 Kilometres	Fuji Speedway	6 October
10	Malaysia 800 Selangor^{†}	Shah Alam Circuit	1 December

† - Non-points races for teams.

== Entries ==
=== Group C1 ===
Entrant	Car	Engine	Tyre	No.	Drivers	Rounds
(West Germany) Rothmans Porsche	Porsche 956; Porsche 962C	Porsche Type-935/76 2.6 L Turbo Flat-6	D	1	(Belgium) Jacky Ickx	All
(West Germany) Rothmans Porsche	Porsche 956; Porsche 962C	Porsche Type-935/76 2.6 L Turbo Flat-6	D	1	(West Germany) Jochen Mass	All
(West Germany) Rothmans Porsche	Porsche 956; Porsche 962C	Porsche Type-935/76 2.6 L Turbo Flat-6	D	2	(United Kingdom) Derek Bell	All
(West Germany) Rothmans Porsche	Porsche 956; Porsche 962C	Porsche Type-935/76 2.6 L Turbo Flat-6	D	2	(West Germany) Hans-Joachim Stuck	All
(West Germany) Rothmans Porsche	Porsche 956; Porsche 962C	Porsche Type-935/76 2.6 L Turbo Flat-6	D	3	(United Kingdom) Derek Bell	2
(West Germany) Rothmans Porsche	Porsche 956; Porsche 962C	Porsche Type-935/76 2.6 L Turbo Flat-6	D	3	(West Germany) Hans-Joachim Stuck	2
(West Germany) Rothmans Porsche	Porsche 956; Porsche 962C	Porsche Type-935/76 2.6 L Turbo Flat-6	D	3	(United States) Al Holbert	4, 8
(West Germany) Rothmans Porsche	Porsche 956; Porsche 962C	Porsche Type-935/76 2.6 L Turbo Flat-6	D	3	(Australia) Vern Schuppan	4, 8
(West Germany) Rothmans Porsche	Porsche 956; Porsche 962C	Porsche Type-935/76 2.6 L Turbo Flat-6	D	3	(United Kingdom) John Watson	4
(West Germany) Rothmans Porsche	Porsche 956; Porsche 962C	Porsche Type-935/76 2.6 L Turbo Flat-6	D	69	(Australia) Vern Schuppan	10
(West Germany) Rothmans Porsche	Porsche 956; Porsche 962C	Porsche Type-935/76 2.6 L Turbo Flat-6	D	69	(United Kingdom) James Weaver	10
(Italy) Martini Racing	Lancia LC2/85	Ferrari 308C 3.0 L Turbo V8	M	4	(Italy) Alessandro Nannini	1–5, 7–8
(Italy) Martini Racing	Lancia LC2/85	Ferrari 308C 3.0 L Turbo V8	M	4	(Italy) Riccardo Patrese	1–3, 5, 7–8
(Italy) Martini Racing	Lancia LC2/85	Ferrari 308C 3.0 L Turbo V8	M	4	(France) Bob Wollek	4
(Italy) Martini Racing	Lancia LC2/85	Ferrari 308C 3.0 L Turbo V8	M	4	(Australia) Lucio Cesario	4
(Italy) Martini Racing	Lancia LC2/85	Ferrari 308C 3.0 L Turbo V8	M	4	(Italy) Mauro Baldi	7
(Italy) Martini Racing	Lancia LC2/85	Ferrari 308C 3.0 L Turbo V8	M	5	(Italy) Mauro Baldi	1–5, 7–8
(Italy) Martini Racing	Lancia LC2/85	Ferrari 308C 3.0 L Turbo V8	M	5	(France) Bob Wollek	1–3, 5, 7–8
(Italy) Martini Racing	Lancia LC2/85	Ferrari 308C 3.0 L Turbo V8	M	5	(Australia) Lucio Cesario	1–2, 7
(Italy) Martini Racing	Lancia LC2/85	Ferrari 308C 3.0 L Turbo V8	M	5	(France) Henri Pescarolo	4
(Italy) Martini Racing	Lancia LC2/85	Ferrari 308C 3.0 L Turbo V8	M	5	(Italy) Riccardo Patrese	7
(Italy) Martini Racing	Lancia LC2/85	Ferrari 308C 3.0 L Turbo V8	M	5	(Italy) Andrea de Cesaris	8
(West Germany) New Man-Joest Racing	Porsche 956B	Porsche Type-935/76 2.6 L Turbo Flat-6	D	7	(Italy) Paolo Barilla	2–5, 7, 9
(West Germany) New Man-Joest Racing	Porsche 956B	Porsche Type-935/76 2.6 L Turbo Flat-6	D	7	(West Germany) Klaus Ludwig	2–5, 7
(West Germany) New Man-Joest Racing	Porsche 956B	Porsche Type-935/76 2.6 L Turbo Flat-6	D	7	(West Germany) Hans Heyer	2
(West Germany) New Man-Joest Racing	Porsche 956B	Porsche Type-935/76 2.6 L Turbo Flat-6	D	7	(France) Paul Belmondo	3
(West Germany) New Man-Joest Racing	Porsche 956B	Porsche Type-935/76 2.6 L Turbo Flat-6	D	7	(West Germany) "John Winter"	4, 9
(West Germany) New Man-Joest Racing	Porsche 956B	Porsche Type-935/76 2.6 L Turbo Flat-6	D	7	(Belgium) Marc Duez	9
(West Germany) New Man-Joest Racing	Porsche 956B	Porsche Type-935/76 2.6 L Turbo Flat-6	D	8	(Colombia) Mauricio DeNarvaez	4, 9
(West Germany) New Man-Joest Racing	Porsche 956B	Porsche Type-935/76 2.6 L Turbo Flat-6	D	8	(France) Paul Belmondo	4, 9
(West Germany) New Man-Joest Racing	Porsche 956B	Porsche Type-935/76 2.6 L Turbo Flat-6	D	8	(United States) Kenper Miller	4
(West Germany) New Man-Joest Racing	Porsche 956B	Porsche Type-935/76 2.6 L Turbo Flat-6	D	8	(West Germany) "John Winter"	5, 7, 9–10
(West Germany) New Man-Joest Racing	Porsche 956B	Porsche Type-935/76 2.6 L Turbo Flat-6	D	8	(West Germany) Volker Weidler	5, 7
(West Germany) New Man-Joest Racing	Porsche 956B	Porsche Type-935/76 2.6 L Turbo Flat-6	D	8	(Austria) Franz Konrad	5
(West Germany) New Man-Joest Racing	Porsche 956B	Porsche Type-935/76 2.6 L Turbo Flat-6	D	8	(Italy) Paolo Barilla	5, 10
(West Germany) New Man-Joest Racing	Porsche 956B	Porsche Type-935/76 2.6 L Turbo Flat-6	D	8	(Belgium) Marc Duez	7
(West Germany) Porsche Kremer Racing	Porsche 956B; Porsche 962C	Porsche Type-935/76 2.6 L Turbo Flat-6	G	9	(Switzerland) Marc Surer	5
(West Germany) Porsche Kremer Racing	Porsche 956B; Porsche 962C	Porsche Type-935/76 2.6 L Turbo Flat-6	G	9	(West Germany) Manfred Winkelhock	5
(West Germany) Porsche Kremer Racing	Porsche 956B; Porsche 962C	Porsche Type-935/76 2.6 L Turbo Flat-6	G	10	(Switzerland) Marc Surer	1–3, 6–7
(West Germany) Porsche Kremer Racing	Porsche 956B; Porsche 962C	Porsche Type-935/76 2.6 L Turbo Flat-6	G	10	(West Germany) Manfred Winkelhock	1–3, 6
(West Germany) Porsche Kremer Racing	Porsche 956B; Porsche 962C	Porsche Type-935/76 2.6 L Turbo Flat-6	G	10	(South Africa) Sarel van der Merwe	4
(West Germany) Porsche Kremer Racing	Porsche 956B; Porsche 962C	Porsche Type-935/76 2.6 L Turbo Flat-6	G	10	(South Africa) George Fouché	4
(West Germany) Porsche Kremer Racing	Porsche 956B; Porsche 962C	Porsche Type-935/76 2.6 L Turbo Flat-6	G	10	(Switzerland) Mario Hytten	4
(West Germany) Porsche Kremer Racing	Porsche 956B; Porsche 962C	Porsche Type-935/76 2.6 L Turbo Flat-6	G	10	(Netherlands) Kees Kroesemeijer	5, 7
(West Germany) Porsche Kremer Racing	Porsche 956B; Porsche 962C	Porsche Type-935/76 2.6 L Turbo Flat-6	G	10	(West Germany) Klaus Niedzwiedz	5
(West Germany) Porsche Kremer Racing	Porsche 956B; Porsche 962C	Porsche Type-935/76 2.6 L Turbo Flat-6	G	11	(South Africa) George Fouché	1–3
(West Germany) Porsche Kremer Racing	Porsche 956B; Porsche 962C	Porsche Type-935/76 2.6 L Turbo Flat-6	G	11	(West Germany) Klaus Ludwig	1
(West Germany) Porsche Kremer Racing	Porsche 956B; Porsche 962C	Porsche Type-935/76 2.6 L Turbo Flat-6	G	11	(Italy) Gianni Mussato	1
(West Germany) Porsche Kremer Racing	Porsche 956B; Porsche 962C	Porsche Type-935/76 2.6 L Turbo Flat-6	G	11	(South Africa) Sarel van der Merwe	2–3
(West Germany) Porsche Kremer Racing	Porsche 956B; Porsche 962C	Porsche Type-935/76 2.6 L Turbo Flat-6	G	11	(Italy) Bruno Giacomelli	2
(West Germany) Porsche Kremer Racing	Porsche 956B; Porsche 962C	Porsche Type-935/76 2.6 L Turbo Flat-6	G	11	(Italy) Almo Coppelli	3
(West Germany) Porsche Kremer Racing	Porsche 956B; Porsche 962C	Porsche Type-935/76 2.6 L Turbo Flat-6	G	11	(France) Jean-Pierre Jarier	4
(West Germany) Porsche Kremer Racing	Porsche 956B; Porsche 962C	Porsche Type-935/76 2.6 L Turbo Flat-6	G	11	(Austria) Franz Konrad	4
(West Germany) Porsche Kremer Racing	Porsche 956B; Porsche 962C	Porsche Type-935/76 2.6 L Turbo Flat-6	G	11	(New Zealand) Mike Thackwell	4
(West Germany) Porsche Kremer Racing	Porsche 956B; Porsche 962C	Porsche Type-935/76 2.6 L Turbo Flat-6	G	11	(Canada) Ludwig Heimrath	6
(West Germany) Porsche Kremer Racing	Porsche 956B; Porsche 962C	Porsche Type-935/76 2.6 L Turbo Flat-6	G	11	(Canada) Ludwig Heimrath Jr.	6
(West Germany) Porsche Kremer Racing	Porsche 956B; Porsche 962C	Porsche Type-935/76 2.6 L Turbo Flat-6	G	11	(Netherlands) Kees Kroesemeijer	6
Panasport Japan	LM 05C	Nissan FJ20 2.3 L Turbo I4	B	12	(Italy) Emanuele Pirro	9
Panasport Japan	LM 05C	Nissan FJ20 2.3 L Turbo I4	B	12	(Japan) Osamu Nakako	9
Panasport Japan	LM 05C	Nissan FJ20 2.3 L Turbo I4	B	12	(Japan) Akio Morimoto	9
(France) Cougar Primagaz	Cougar C12	Porsche Type-935/76 2.6 L Turbo Flat-6	M	13	(France) Yves Courage	4, 7
(France) Cougar Primagaz	Cougar C12	Porsche Type-935/76 2.6 L Turbo Flat-6	M	13	(France) Jean-François Yvon	4
(France) Cougar Primagaz	Cougar C12	Porsche Type-935/76 2.6 L Turbo Flat-6	M	13	(United Kingdom) Alain de Cadenet	4
(France) Cougar Primagaz	Cougar C12	Porsche Type-935/76 2.6 L Turbo Flat-6	M	13	(France) Henri Pescarolo	7
(United Kingdom) Richard Lloyd Racing with Porsche	Porsche 956	Porsche Type-935/76 2.6 L Turbo Flat-6	G	14	(United Kingdom) Jonathan Palmer	2–5, 7
(United Kingdom) Richard Lloyd Racing with Porsche	Porsche 956	Porsche Type-935/76 2.6 L Turbo Flat-6	G	14	(Netherlands) Jan Lammers	2–3
(United Kingdom) Richard Lloyd Racing with Porsche	Porsche 956	Porsche Type-935/76 2.6 L Turbo Flat-6	G	14	(United Kingdom) James Weaver	4
(United Kingdom) Richard Lloyd Racing with Porsche	Porsche 956	Porsche Type-935/76 2.6 L Turbo Flat-6	G	14	(United Kingdom) Richard Lloyd	4
(United Kingdom) Richard Lloyd Racing with Porsche	Porsche 956	Porsche Type-935/76 2.6 L Turbo Flat-6	G	14	(United Kingdom) David Hobbs	5, 7
(United Kingdom) Richard Lloyd Racing with Porsche	Porsche 956	Porsche Type-935/76 2.6 L Turbo Flat-6	G	14	(United Kingdom) Kenny Acheson	9
(United Kingdom) Richard Lloyd Racing with Porsche	Porsche 956	Porsche Type-935/76 2.6 L Turbo Flat-6	G	14	(United Kingdom) Johnny Dumfries	9
(United Kingdom) Richard Lloyd Racing with Porsche	Porsche 956	Porsche Type-935/76 2.6 L Turbo Flat-6	D	69	(Australia) Vern Schuppan	3
(United Kingdom) Richard Lloyd Racing with Porsche	Porsche 956	Porsche Type-935/76 2.6 L Turbo Flat-6	D	69	(United Kingdom) James Weaver	3
(United Kingdom) RC Racing	Kremer CK5	Porsche Type-935 3.0 L Turbo Flat-6	D	16	(United Kingdom) Richard Cleare	8
(United Kingdom) RC Racing	Kremer CK5	Porsche Type-935 3.0 L Turbo Flat-6	D	16	(United Kingdom) David Leslie	8
(Switzerland) Brun Motorsport	Porsche 956B; Porsche 962C	Porsche Type-935/76 2.6 L Turbo Flat-6	D	18	(Argentina) Oscar Larrauri	1, 3–5, 7, 10
(Switzerland) Brun Motorsport	Porsche 956B; Porsche 962C	Porsche Type-935/76 2.6 L Turbo Flat-6	D	18	(Italy) Massimo Sigala	1, 3–5, 7, 10
(Switzerland) Brun Motorsport	Porsche 956B; Porsche 962C	Porsche Type-935/76 2.6 L Turbo Flat-6	D	18	(Belgium) Thierry Boutsen	2
(Switzerland) Brun Motorsport	Porsche 956B; Porsche 962C	Porsche Type-935/76 2.6 L Turbo Flat-6	D	18	(West Germany) Stefan Bellof	2
(Switzerland) Brun Motorsport	Porsche 956B; Porsche 962C	Porsche Type-935/76 2.6 L Turbo Flat-6	D	18	(Italy) Gabriele Tarquini	4
(Switzerland) Brun Motorsport	Porsche 956B; Porsche 962C	Porsche Type-935/76 2.6 L Turbo Flat-6	D	18	(West Germany) Frank Jelinski	10
(Switzerland) Brun Motorsport	Porsche 956B; Porsche 962C	Porsche Type-935/76 2.6 L Turbo Flat-6	D	19	(Belgium) Thierry Boutsen	1, 3, 5, 7
(Switzerland) Brun Motorsport	Porsche 956B; Porsche 962C	Porsche Type-935/76 2.6 L Turbo Flat-6	D	19	(West Germany) Stefan Bellof	1, 5, 7
(Switzerland) Brun Motorsport	Porsche 956B; Porsche 962C	Porsche Type-935/76 2.6 L Turbo Flat-6	D	19	(Argentina) Oscar Larrauri	2
(Switzerland) Brun Motorsport	Porsche 956B; Porsche 962C	Porsche Type-935/76 2.6 L Turbo Flat-6	D	19	(Italy) Massimo Sigala	2
(Switzerland) Brun Motorsport	Porsche 956B; Porsche 962C	Porsche Type-935/76 2.6 L Turbo Flat-6	D	19	(Italy) Renzo Zorzi	2
(Switzerland) Brun Motorsport	Porsche 956B; Porsche 962C	Porsche Type-935/76 2.6 L Turbo Flat-6	D	19	(Switzerland) Walter Brun	3–4
(Switzerland) Brun Motorsport	Porsche 956B; Porsche 962C	Porsche Type-935/76 2.6 L Turbo Flat-6	D	19	(Belgium) Didier Theys	4
(Switzerland) Brun Motorsport	Porsche 956B; Porsche 962C	Porsche Type-935/76 2.6 L Turbo Flat-6	D	19	(France) Joël Gouhier	4
(Switzerland) Brun Motorsport	Porsche 956B; Porsche 962C	Porsche Type-935/76 2.6 L Turbo Flat-6	D	20	(Switzerland) Walter Brun	1, 5
(Switzerland) Brun Motorsport	Porsche 956B; Porsche 962C	Porsche Type-935/76 2.6 L Turbo Flat-6	D	20	(West Germany) Leopold von Bayern	1
(Switzerland) Brun Motorsport	Porsche 956B; Porsche 962C	Porsche Type-935/76 2.6 L Turbo Flat-6	D	20	(Austria) Gerhard Berger	5
(Canada) Bieri Racing	Sauber C7	Chevrolet 6.0 L V8	G	18	(Canada) Guy Bieri	6
(Canada) Bieri Racing	Sauber C7	Chevrolet 6.0 L V8	G	18	(Canada) Matt Gysler	6
(Canada) Bieri Racing	Sauber C7	Chevrolet 6.0 L V8	G	18	(El Salvador) "Fomfor"	6
Cheetah Automobiles Switzerland	Cheetah G604	Aston Martin 5.3 L V8	D	23; 24	(Belgium) Bernard de Dryver	1–2, 4, 7–9
Cheetah Automobiles Switzerland	Cheetah G604	Aston Martin 5.3 L V8	D	23; 24	(Italy) Gianfranco Brancatelli	1–2
Cheetah Automobiles Switzerland	Cheetah G604	Aston Martin 5.3 L V8	D	23; 24	(United Kingdom) John Cooper	3–5
Cheetah Automobiles Switzerland	Cheetah G604	Aston Martin 5.3 L V8	D	23; 24	(United Kingdom) John Brindley	3, 8
Cheetah Automobiles Switzerland	Cheetah G604	Aston Martin 5.3 L V8	D	23; 24	(Belgium) Claude Bourgoignie	4, 7
Cheetah Automobiles Switzerland	Cheetah G604	Aston Martin 5.3 L V8	D	23; 24	(United Kingdom) Tiff Needell	5
Cheetah Automobiles Switzerland	Cheetah G604	Aston Martin 5.3 L V8	D	23; 24	(Belgium) Pierre Dieudonné	7
Cheetah Automobiles Switzerland	Cheetah G604	Aston Martin 5.3 L V8	D	23; 24	(Belgium) Hervé Regout	8
Cheetah Automobiles Switzerland	Cheetah G604	Aston Martin 5.3 L V8	D	23; 24	(France) Laurent Ferrier	9
(Japan) Advan Sports Nova	Porsche 962C	Porsche Type-935/76 2.6 L Turbo Flat-6	Y	25	(Japan) Kunimitsu Takahashi	9
(Japan) Advan Sports Nova	Porsche 962C	Porsche Type-935/76 2.6 L Turbo Flat-6	Y	25	(Japan) Kenji Takahashi	9
(Japan) From A Racing	Porsche 956	Porsche Type-935/76 2.6 L Turbo Flat-6	D	27	(Japan) Jirou Yoneyama	9
(Japan) From A Racing	Porsche 956	Porsche Type-935/76 2.6 L Turbo Flat-6	D	27	(Japan) Hideki Okada	9
(West Germany) Obermaier Racing	Porsche 956	Porsche Type-935/76 2.6 L Turbo Flat-6	G	26	(West Germany) Jürgen Lässig	1–5, 7
(West Germany) Obermaier Racing	Porsche 956	Porsche Type-935/76 2.6 L Turbo Flat-6	G	26	(Belgium) Hervé Regout	1–5, 7
(West Germany) Obermaier Racing	Porsche 956	Porsche Type-935/76 2.6 L Turbo Flat-6	G	26	(New Zealand) Mike Thackwell	1
(West Germany) Obermaier Racing	Porsche 956	Porsche Type-935/76 2.6 L Turbo Flat-6	G	26	(Spain) Jesús Pareja	2–5, 7
(Japan) Hoshino Racing	March 85G	Nissan VG30ET 3.0 L Turbo V6	B	28	(Japan) Kazuyoshi Hoshino	9
(Japan) Hoshino Racing	March 85G	Nissan VG30ET 3.0 L Turbo V6	B	28	(Japan) Akira Hagiwara	9
(Japan) Hoshino Racing	March 85G	Nissan VG30ET 3.0 L Turbo V6	B	28	(Japan) Keiji Matsumoto	9
(Japan) Central 20 Racing Team	Lola T810	Nissan VG30ET 3.0 L Turbo V6	D	30	(Japan) Aguri Suzuki	9
(Japan) Central 20 Racing Team	Lola T810	Nissan VG30ET 3.0 L Turbo V6	D	30	(Japan) Haruhito Yanagida	9
(France) Primagaz	Rondeau M382	Ford Cosworth DFV 3.0 L V8	D	31	(France) Pierre Yver	3–4
(France) Primagaz	Rondeau M382	Ford Cosworth DFV 3.0 L V8	D	31	(France) Pierre-François Rousselot	3–4
(France) Primagaz	Rondeau M382	Ford Cosworth DFV 3.0 L V8	D	31	(France) Jean Rondeau	3
(France) Primagaz	Rondeau M382	Ford Cosworth DFV 3.0 L V8	D	31	(France) François Servanin	4
(United Kingdom) John Fitzpatrick Racing	Porsche 956B	Porsche Type-935/76 2.6 L Turbo Flat-6	Y	33	(Austria) Jo Gartner	2–4, 9
(United Kingdom) John Fitzpatrick Racing	Porsche 956B	Porsche Type-935/76 2.6 L Turbo Flat-6	Y	33	(United Kingdom) Kenny Acheson	2
(United Kingdom) John Fitzpatrick Racing	Porsche 956B	Porsche Type-935/76 2.6 L Turbo Flat-6	Y	33	(United Kingdom) David Hobbs	3–4
(United Kingdom) John Fitzpatrick Racing	Porsche 956B	Porsche Type-935/76 2.6 L Turbo Flat-6	Y	33	(United Kingdom) Guy Edwards	4
(United Kingdom) John Fitzpatrick Racing	Porsche 956B	Porsche Type-935/76 2.6 L Turbo Flat-6	Y	33	(Republic of Ireland) Michael Roe	9
(United Kingdom) John Fitzpatrick Racing	Porsche 956B	Porsche Type-935/76 2.6 L Turbo Flat-6	Y	33	(Austria) Franz Konrad	10
(United Kingdom) John Fitzpatrick Racing	Porsche 956B	Porsche Type-935/76 2.6 L Turbo Flat-6	Y	33	(Australia) Andrew Miedecke	10
(United Kingdom) John Fitzpatrick Racing	Porsche 956B	Porsche Type-935/76 2.6 L Turbo Flat-6	Y	55	(United Kingdom) Dudley Wood	2–4
(United Kingdom) John Fitzpatrick Racing	Porsche 956B	Porsche Type-935/76 2.6 L Turbo Flat-6	Y	55	(Peru) Manuel López	2–3
(United Kingdom) John Fitzpatrick Racing	Porsche 956B	Porsche Type-935/76 2.6 L Turbo Flat-6	Y	55	(West Germany) Klaus Niedzwiedz	2
(United Kingdom) John Fitzpatrick Racing	Porsche 956B	Porsche Type-935/76 2.6 L Turbo Flat-6	Y	55	(United Kingdom) Guy Edwards	3
(United Kingdom) John Fitzpatrick Racing	Porsche 956B	Porsche Type-935/76 2.6 L Turbo Flat-6	Y	55	(United Kingdom) Kenny Acheson	4
(South Africa) Kreepy Krauly Racing (United Kingdom) Cosmik Racing Promotions	March 84G	Porsche Type-935/76 2.6 L Turbo Flat-6	Y	34	(West Germany) Christian Danner	4–7, 10
(South Africa) Kreepy Krauly Racing (United Kingdom) Cosmik Racing Promotions	March 84G	Porsche Type-935/76 2.6 L Turbo Flat-6	Y	34	(South Africa) Graham Duxbury	4
(South Africa) Kreepy Krauly Racing (United Kingdom) Cosmik Racing Promotions	March 84G	Porsche Type-935/76 2.6 L Turbo Flat-6	Y	34	(Italy) Almo Coppelli	4
(South Africa) Kreepy Krauly Racing (United Kingdom) Cosmik Racing Promotions	March 84G	Porsche Type-935/76 2.6 L Turbo Flat-6	Y	34	(Greece) Costas Los	5–8, 9–10
(South Africa) Kreepy Krauly Racing (United Kingdom) Cosmik Racing Promotions	March 84G	Porsche Type-935/76 2.6 L Turbo Flat-6	Y	34	(Sweden) Mikael Nabrink	5–6
(South Africa) Kreepy Krauly Racing (United Kingdom) Cosmik Racing Promotions	March 84G	Porsche Type-935/76 2.6 L Turbo Flat-6	Y	34	(Belgium) Pascal Witmeur	7
(South Africa) Kreepy Krauly Racing (United Kingdom) Cosmik Racing Promotions	March 84G	Porsche Type-935/76 2.6 L Turbo Flat-6	Y	34	(Sweden) Anders Olofsson	8–9
(South Africa) Kreepy Krauly Racing (United Kingdom) Cosmik Racing Promotions	March 84G	Porsche Type-935/76 2.6 L Turbo Flat-6	Y	34	(Italy) Divina Galica	8
(South Africa) Kreepy Krauly Racing (United Kingdom) Cosmik Racing Promotions	March 84G	Porsche Type-935/76 2.6 L Turbo Flat-6	Y	34	(United Kingdom) Richard Cleare	9
(Japan) Misaki Speed	Tom's 85C	Toyota 4T-GT 2.1 L Turbo I4	B	35	(Japan) Kiyoshi Misaki	9
(Japan) Misaki Speed	Tom's 85C	Toyota 4T-GT 2.1 L Turbo I4	B	35	(Japan) Toshio Suzuki	9
(Japan) Misaki Speed	Tom's 85C	Toyota 4T-GT 2.1 L Turbo I4	B	35	(Japan) Kaoru Hoshino	9
(Japan) Tom's Team	Tom's 85C	Toyota 4T-GT 2.1 L Turbo I4	B	36	(Japan) Masanori Sekiya	4, 9
(Japan) Tom's Team	Tom's 85C	Toyota 4T-GT 2.1 L Turbo I4	B	36	(Japan) Satoru Nakajima	4, 9
(Japan) Tom's Team	Tom's 85C	Toyota 4T-GT 2.1 L Turbo I4	B	36	(Japan) Kaoru Hoshino	4
(Japan) Ikuzawa Racing	Tom's 85C	Toyota 4T-GT 2.1 L Turbo I4	D	37	(United Kingdom) Tiff Needell	9
(Japan) Ikuzawa Racing	Tom's 85C	Toyota 4T-GT 2.1 L Turbo I4	D	37	(United Kingdom) James Weaver	9
(Japan) Dome Motorsport	Dome 85C	Toyota 4T-GT 2.1 L Turbo I4	D	38	(Sweden) Eje Elgh	4, 9
(Japan) Dome Motorsport	Dome 85C	Toyota 4T-GT 2.1 L Turbo I4	D	38	(United Kingdom) Geoff Lees	4, 9
(Japan) Dome Motorsport	Dome 85C	Toyota 4T-GT 2.1 L Turbo I4	D	38	(Japan) Toshio Suzuki	4
(France) Bussi Racing	Rondeau M382	Ford Cosworth DFL 3.3 L V8	D	39	(France) Jean-Claude Justice	4
(France) Bussi Racing	Rondeau M382	Ford Cosworth DFL 3.3 L V8	D	39	(France) Bruno Sotty	4
(France) Bussi Racing	Rondeau M382	Ford Cosworth DFL 3.3 L V8	D	39	(France) Patrick Oudet	4
(France) Bussi Racing	Rondeau M482	Ford Cosworth DFL 3.3 L V8	M	46	(France) Christian Bussi	4
(France) Bussi Racing	Rondeau M482	Ford Cosworth DFL 3.3 L V8	M	46	(United States) Jack Griffin	4
(France) Bussi Racing	Rondeau M482	Ford Cosworth DFL 3.3 L V8	M	46	(United States) M. L. Speer	4
(France) WM-Peugeot	WM P83B	Peugeot ZNS4 2.6 L Turbo V6	M	41	(France) Pascal Pessiot	4
(France) WM-Peugeot	WM P83B	Peugeot ZNS4 2.6 L Turbo V6	M	41	(France) Patrick Gaillard	4
(France) WM-Peugeot	WM P83B	Peugeot ZNS4 2.6 L Turbo V6	M	41	(France) Dominique Fornage	4
(France) WM-Peugeot	WM P83B	Peugeot ZNS4 2.6 L Turbo V6	M	42	(France) Jean Rondeau	4
(France) WM-Peugeot	WM P83B	Peugeot ZNS4 2.6 L Turbo V6	M	42	(France) Michel Pignard	4
(France) WM-Peugeot	WM P83B	Peugeot ZNS4 2.6 L Turbo V6	M	42	(France) Jean-Daniel Raulet	4
(France) WM-Peugeot	WM P83B	Peugeot ZNS4 2.6 L Turbo V6	M	43	(France) Jean-Claude Andruet	4
(France) WM-Peugeot	WM P83B	Peugeot ZNS4 2.6 L Turbo V6	M	43	(France) Roger Dorchy	4
(France) WM-Peugeot	WM P83B	Peugeot ZNS4 2.6 L Turbo V6	M	43	(Switzerland) Claude Haldi	4
(Japan) Auto Beaurex Motorsport	Tom's 84C	Toyota 4T-GT 2.1 L Turbo I4	D	45	(Japan) Naoki Nagasaka	9
(Japan) Auto Beaurex Motorsport	Tom's 84C	Toyota 4T-GT 2.1 L Turbo I4	D	45	(Japan) Taku Akaike	9
(West Germany) Kumsan Tiger Team	Zakspeed C1/8	Ford Cosworth DFL 4.0 L V8	G	46	(West Germany) Harald Becker	5
(West Germany) Kumsan Tiger Team	Zakspeed C1/8	Ford Cosworth DFL 4.0 L V8	G	46	(West Germany) Jan Thoelke	5
(Japan) Garage Italya	Lancia LC2/84	Ferrari 308C 3.0 L Turbo V8	D	47	(France) Henri Pescarolo	9
(Japan) Garage Italya	Lancia LC2/84	Ferrari 308C 3.0 L Turbo V8	D	47	(Australia) Lucio Cesario	9
(Japan) Alpha Cubic Racing Team	Porsche 956B	Porsche Type-935/76 2.6 L Turbo Flat-6	B	48	(Japan) Noritake Takahara	9
(Japan) Alpha Cubic Racing Team	Porsche 956B	Porsche Type-935/76 2.6 L Turbo Flat-6	B	48	(Japan) Chiyomi Tatami	9
(Japan) Hasemi Motorsport	March 85G	Nissan VG30ET 3.0 L Turbo V6	D	50	(Japan) Masahiro Hasemi	9
(Japan) Hasemi Motorsport	March 85G	Nissan VG30ET 3.0 L Turbo V6	D	50	(Japan) Takao Wada	9
(United Kingdom) TWR Jaguar	Jaguar XJR-6	Jaguar 6.2 L V12	D	51	(New Zealand) Mike Thackwell	6–7, 9–10
(United Kingdom) TWR Jaguar	Jaguar XJR-6	Jaguar 6.2 L V12	D	51	(United Kingdom) Martin Brundle	6–7
(United Kingdom) TWR Jaguar	Jaguar XJR-6	Jaguar 6.2 L V12	D	51	(France) Jean-Louis Schlesser	8
(United Kingdom) TWR Jaguar	Jaguar XJR-6	Jaguar 6.2 L V12	D	51	(Australia) Alan Jones	8
(United Kingdom) TWR Jaguar	Jaguar XJR-6	Jaguar 6.2 L V12	D	51	(Denmark) John Nielsen	9–10
(United Kingdom) TWR Jaguar	Jaguar XJR-6	Jaguar 6.2 L V12	D	51	(West Germany) Hans Heyer	9
(United Kingdom) TWR Jaguar	Jaguar XJR-6	Jaguar 6.2 L V12	D	51	(Netherlands) Jan Lammers	10
(United Kingdom) TWR Jaguar	Jaguar XJR-6	Jaguar 6.2 L V12	D	52	(West Germany) Hans Heyer	6–9
(United Kingdom) TWR Jaguar	Jaguar XJR-6	Jaguar 6.2 L V12	D	52	(France) Jean-Louis Schlesser	6–7
(United Kingdom) TWR Jaguar	Jaguar XJR-6	Jaguar 6.2 L V12	D	52	(New Zealand) Mike Thackwell	6–7, 9
(United Kingdom) TWR Jaguar	Jaguar XJR-6	Jaguar 6.2 L V12	D	52	(United Kingdom) Martin Brundle	6
(United Kingdom) TWR Jaguar	Jaguar XJR-6	Jaguar 6.2 L V12	D	52	(Netherlands) Jan Lammers	8, 10
(United Kingdom) TWR Jaguar	Jaguar XJR-6	Jaguar 6.2 L V12	D	52	(United Kingdom) Steve Soper	9
(United Kingdom) TWR Jaguar	Jaguar XJR-6	Jaguar 6.2 L V12	D	52	(Italy) Gianfranco Brancatelli	10
(Japan) Rays Racing Division	Tom's 84C	Toyota 4T-GT 2.1 L Turbo I4	D	57	(Japan) Hitoshi Ogawa	9
(Japan) Rays Racing Division	Tom's 84C	Toyota 4T-GT 2.1 L Turbo I4	D	57	(Japan) Tsunehisa Asai	9
(Japan) Trust Racing Team	Porsche 956	Porsche Type-935/76 2.6 L Turbo Flat-6	D	60	(Australia) Vern Schuppan	9
(Japan) Trust Racing Team	Porsche 956	Porsche Type-935/76 2.6 L Turbo Flat-6	D	60	(South Africa) George Fouché	9
(Japan) Trust Racing Team	Porsche 956	Porsche Type-935/76 2.6 L Turbo Flat-6	D	60	(Japan) Keiichi Suzuki	9
(Switzerland) Sauber	Sauber C8	Mercedes-Benz M117 5.0 L Turbo V8	D	61	(Austria) Dieter Quester	4
(Switzerland) Sauber	Sauber C8	Mercedes-Benz M117 5.0 L Turbo V8	D	61	(Denmark) John Nielsen	4
(Switzerland) Sauber	Sauber C8	Mercedes-Benz M117 5.0 L Turbo V8	D	61	(Switzerland) Max Welti	4
(United Kingdom) EMKA Productions Ltd.	EMKA C84	Aston Martin 5.3 L V8	D	66	(United Kingdom) Tiff Needell	3–4, 7–8
(United Kingdom) EMKA Productions Ltd.	EMKA C84	Aston Martin 5.3 L V8	D	66	(United Kingdom) Steve O'Rourke	3–4, 7–8
(United Kingdom) EMKA Productions Ltd.	EMKA C84	Aston Martin 5.3 L V8	D	66	(United Kingdom) Bob Evans	3
(United Kingdom) EMKA Productions Ltd.	EMKA C84	Aston Martin 5.3 L V8	D	66	(United Kingdom) Nick Faure	4
(United Kingdom) EMKA Productions Ltd.	EMKA C84	Aston Martin 5.3 L V8	D	66	(United Kingdom) James Weaver	7
(United Kingdom) EMKA Productions Ltd.	EMKA C84	Aston Martin 5.3 L V8	D	66	(Republic of Ireland) Mark Galvin	8
(United Kingdom) Spice Engineering	Tiga GC84	Ford Cosworth DFL 4.0 L V8	D	67; 54	(United Kingdom) Tim Lee-Davey	3, 8
(United Kingdom) Spice Engineering	Tiga GC84	Ford Cosworth DFL 4.0 L V8	D	67; 54	(Australia) Neil Crang	3, 8
(France) Jean-Philippe Grand	Rondeau M482	Ford Cosworth DFL 3.3 L V8	M	67	(France) Patrick Gonin	4
(France) Jean-Philippe Grand	Rondeau M482	Ford Cosworth DFL 3.3 L V8	M	67	(France) Pierre de Thoisy	4
(France) Jean-Philippe Grand	Rondeau M482	Ford Cosworth DFL 3.3 L V8	M	67	(Belgium) Pascal Witmeur	4

=== Group C2 ===
Entrant	Car	Engine	Tyre	No.	Drivers	Rounds
(United Kingdom) Spice Engineering	Tiga GC85	Ford Cosworth DFL 3.3 L V8	A	70	(United Kingdom) Ray Bellm	1–8
(United Kingdom) Spice Engineering	Tiga GC85	Ford Cosworth DFL 3.3 L V8	A	70	(United Kingdom) Gordon Spice	1–8
(United Kingdom) Spice Engineering	Tiga GC85	Ford Cosworth DFL 3.3 L V8	A	70	(Republic of Ireland) Mark Galvin	4
(United Kingdom) Spice Engineering	Tiga GC84	Ford Cosworth DFV 3.0 L V8	D	77	(United Kingdom) Tom Lanfranchi	4
(United Kingdom) Spice Engineering	Tiga GC84	Ford Cosworth DFV 3.0 L V8	D	77	(United Kingdom) Tim Lee-Davey	4
(United Kingdom) Spice Engineering	Tiga GC84	Ford Cosworth DFV 3.0 L V8	D	77	(Australia) Neil Crang	4
(West Germany) Gebhardt Motorsport	Gebhardt JC842; Gebhardt JC843	BMW M12/7 2.0 L I4; Ford Cosworth DFV 3.0 L V8	A	72	(West Germany) Günther Gebhardt	2, 5
(West Germany) Gebhardt Motorsport	Gebhardt JC842; Gebhardt JC843	BMW M12/7 2.0 L I4; Ford Cosworth DFV 3.0 L V8	A	72	(Austria) Walter Lechner	2, 5
(West Germany) Gebhardt Motorsport	Gebhardt JC842; Gebhardt JC843	BMW M12/7 2.0 L I4; Ford Cosworth DFV 3.0 L V8	A	72	(West Germany) Frank Jelinski	2
(West Germany) Gebhardt Motorsport	Gebhardt JC842; Gebhardt JC843	BMW M12/7 2.0 L I4; Ford Cosworth DFV 3.0 L V8	A	72	(Czechoslovakia) Miroslav Adámek	5
(West Germany) Gebhardt Motorsport (Canada) Team Labatt	Gebhardt JC853	Ford Cosworth DFL 3.3 L V8	A	74	(West Germany) Frank Jelinski	3–7, 9–10
(West Germany) Gebhardt Motorsport (Canada) Team Labatt	Gebhardt JC853	Ford Cosworth DFL 3.3 L V8	A	74	(Canada) John Graham	3–7, 9
(West Germany) Gebhardt Motorsport (Canada) Team Labatt	Gebhardt JC853	Ford Cosworth DFL 3.3 L V8	A	74	(United Kingdom) Nick Adams	3–4
(West Germany) Gebhardt Motorsport (Canada) Team Labatt	Gebhardt JC853	Ford Cosworth DFL 3.3 L V8	A	74	(West Germany) Manuel Reuter	5
(West Germany) Gebhardt Motorsport (Canada) Team Labatt	Gebhardt JC853	Ford Cosworth DFL 3.3 L V8	A	74	(Sweden) Stanley Dickens	7, 9–10
(West Germany) Gebhardt Motorsport (Canada) Team Labatt	Gebhardt JC853	Ford Cosworth DFL 3.3 L V8	A	74	(Austria) Walter Lechner	10
(United Kingdom) ADA Engineering	Gebhardt JC843	Ford Cosworth DFL 3.3 L V8	A	75	(United Kingdom) Ian Harrower	2–4, 8, 10
(United Kingdom) ADA Engineering	Gebhardt JC843	Ford Cosworth DFL 3.3 L V8	A	75	(United Kingdom) Richard Jones	2
(United Kingdom) ADA Engineering	Gebhardt JC843	Ford Cosworth DFL 3.3 L V8	A	75	(United Kingdom) David Duffield	2
(United Kingdom) ADA Engineering	Gebhardt JC843	Ford Cosworth DFL 3.3 L V8	A	75	(United States) Steve Earle	3–4
(United Kingdom) ADA Engineering	Gebhardt JC843	Ford Cosworth DFL 3.3 L V8	A	75	(Republic of Ireland) Mark Galvin	3
(United Kingdom) ADA Engineering	Gebhardt JC843	Ford Cosworth DFL 3.3 L V8	A	75	(United Kingdom) John Sheldon	4
(United Kingdom) ADA Engineering	Gebhardt JC843	Ford Cosworth DFL 3.3 L V8	A	75	(United Kingdom) Nick Adams	8
(United Kingdom) ADA Engineering	Gebhardt JC843	Ford Cosworth DFL 3.3 L V8	A	75	(United Kingdom) Ian Taylor	8
(United Kingdom) ADA Engineering	Gebhardt JC843	Ford Cosworth DFL 3.3 L V8	A	75	(United Kingdom) Richard Piper	10
(United Kingdom) ADA Engineering	Gebhardt JC843	Ford Cosworth DFL 3.3 L V8	A	75	(United Kingdom) Evan Clements	10
(United Kingdom) Ecurie Ecosse	Ecosse C285	Ford Cosworth DFV 3.0 L V8; Ford Cosworth DFL 3.3 L V8	A	79	(United Kingdom) Mike Wilds	2–5, 7–8
(United Kingdom) Ecurie Ecosse	Ecosse C285	Ford Cosworth DFV 3.0 L V8; Ford Cosworth DFL 3.3 L V8	A	79	(United Kingdom) Ray Mallock	2–5, 7–8
(United Kingdom) Ecurie Ecosse	Ecosse C285	Ford Cosworth DFV 3.0 L V8; Ford Cosworth DFL 3.3 L V8	A	79	(United Kingdom) David Leslie	2–5, 7
(Italy) Carma FF	Alba AR6	Carma 1.9 L Turbo I4	A	80	(Italy) Martino Finotto	1–8
(Italy) Carma FF	Alba AR6	Carma 1.9 L Turbo I4	A	80	(Italy) Guido Daccò	1–4
(Italy) Carma FF	Alba AR6	Carma 1.9 L Turbo I4	A	80	(Italy) Carlo Facetti	1–3, 5–8
(Italy) Carma FF	Alba AR6	Carma 1.9 L Turbo I4	A	80	(Italy) Aldo Bertuzzi	4
(Italy) Carma FF	Alba AR6	Carma 1.9 L Turbo I4	A	80	(Australia) Lucio Cesario	5
(Italy) Carma FF	Alba AR6	Carma 1.9 L Turbo I4	A	80	(Switzerland) Jean-Pierre Frey	6
(Italy) Carma FF	Alba AR6	Carma 1.9 L Turbo I4	A	80	(Italy) Almo Coppelli	7–8
(Italy) Carma FF	Alba AR2	Carma 1.9 L Turbo I4	A	81	(Switzerland) Jean-Pierre Frey	2–5
(Italy) Carma FF	Alba AR2	Carma 1.9 L Turbo I4	A	81	(Switzerland) Loris Kessel	2–4
(Italy) Carma FF	Alba AR2	Carma 1.9 L Turbo I4	A	81	(Italy) Almo Coppelli	2
(Italy) Carma FF	Alba AR2	Carma 1.9 L Turbo I4	A	81	(Italy) Aldo Bertuzzi	4
(Italy) Carma FF	Alba AR2	Carma 1.9 L Turbo I4	A	81	(Italy) Ruggero Melgrati	4
(Italy) Carma FF	Alba AR2	Carma 1.9 L Turbo I4	A	81	(Switzerland) Marco Vanoli	5
(Italy) Grifo Autoracing	Alba AR3	Ford Cosworth DFL 3.3 L V8	D	82	(Italy) Pasquale Barberio	3–8, 10
(Italy) Grifo Autoracing	Alba AR3	Ford Cosworth DFL 3.3 L V8	D	82	(Italy) Paolo Giangrossi	3–5
(Italy) Grifo Autoracing	Alba AR3	Ford Cosworth DFL 3.3 L V8	D	82	(Italy) Maurizio Gellini	3, 5–8
(Italy) Grifo Autoracing	Alba AR3	Ford Cosworth DFL 3.3 L V8	D	82	(Italy) Mario Radicella	4
(Italy) Grifo Autoracing	Alba AR3	Ford Cosworth DFL 3.3 L V8	D	82	(Switzerland) Jean-Pierre Frey	8, 10
(Italy) Grifo Autoracing	Alba AR3	Ford Cosworth DFL 3.3 L V8	D	82	(New Zealand) John Nicholson	10
(Japan) Auto Beaurex Motorsport	Lotec M1C	BMW M88 3.5 L I6	Y	84	(Japan) Kozuo Mogi	9
(Japan) Auto Beaurex Motorsport	Lotec M1C	BMW M88 3.5 L I6	Y	84	(Japan) Toshio Motohashi	9
(Japan) Mazdaspeed Co. Ltd.	Mazda 737C	Mazda 13B 1.3 L 2-rotor	D	85	(Japan) Yoshimi Katayama	3–4, 9
(Japan) Mazdaspeed Co. Ltd.	Mazda 737C	Mazda 13B 1.3 L 2-rotor	D	85	(Japan) Takashi Yorino	3–4, 9
(Japan) Mazdaspeed Co. Ltd.	Mazda 737C	Mazda 13B 1.3 L 2-rotor	D	85	(Japan) Yojiro Terada	4
(Japan) Mazdaspeed Co. Ltd.	Mazda 737C	Mazda 13B 1.3 L 2-rotor	D	86	(Republic of Ireland) David Kennedy	3–4, 9
(Japan) Mazdaspeed Co. Ltd.	Mazda 737C	Mazda 13B 1.3 L 2-rotor	D	86	(Japan) Yojiro Terada	3, 9
(Japan) Mazdaspeed Co. Ltd.	Mazda 737C	Mazda 13B 1.3 L 2-rotor	D	86	(Belgium) Philippe Martin	4
(Japan) Mazdaspeed Co. Ltd.	Mazda 737C	Mazda 13B 1.3 L 2-rotor	D	86	(Belgium) Jean-Michel Martin	4
(United Kingdom) Ark Racing Arthur Hough Pressings	Ceekar 83J-1	Ford Cosworth BDX 2.0 L I4	A	88	(United Kingdom) Max Payne	1–3, 5–8, 10
(United Kingdom) Ark Racing Arthur Hough Pressings	Ceekar 83J-1	Ford Cosworth BDX 2.0 L I4	A	88	(United Kingdom) David Andrews	1–3, 5–8, 10
(United Kingdom) Ark Racing Arthur Hough Pressings	Ceekar 83J-1	Ford Cosworth BDX 2.0 L I4	A	88	(United Kingdom) Chris Ashmore	1–3, 5, 7–8
Jens Winther Castrol Denmark	URD C83	BMW M88 3.5 L I6	A	90	(Denmark) Jens Winther	1–5, 7–8
Jens Winther Castrol Denmark	URD C83	BMW M88 3.5 L I6	A	90	(Denmark) Lars-Viggo Jensen	1
Jens Winther Castrol Denmark	URD C83	BMW M88 3.5 L I6	A	90	(United Kingdom) David Mercer	2–5, 7–8
Jens Winther Castrol Denmark	URD C83	BMW M88 3.5 L I6	A	90	(United States) Margie Smith-Haas	4
Jens Winther Castrol Denmark	URD C83	BMW M88 3.5 L I6	A	90	(Republic of Ireland) Martin Birrane	5
(France) Automobiles Louis Descartes	ALD 01	BMW M88 3.5 L I6	A	93	(France) Louis Descartes	4–5, 7
(France) Automobiles Louis Descartes	ALD 01	BMW M88 3.5 L I6	A	93	(France) Jacques Heuclin	4–5, 7
(France) Automobiles Louis Descartes	ALD 01	BMW M88 3.5 L I6	A	93	(Belgium) Daniël Hubert	4
(France) Roland Bassaler	Sauber SHS C6	BMW M88 3.5 L I6	A	95	(France) Dominique Lacaud	4, 7–8
(France) Roland Bassaler	Sauber SHS C6	BMW M88 3.5 L I6	A	95	(France) Roland Bassaler	4, 7–8
(France) Roland Bassaler	Sauber SHS C6	BMW M88 3.5 L I6	A	95	(France) Yvon Tapy	4
(France) Roland Bassaler	Sauber SHS C6	BMW M88 3.5 L I6	A	95	(France) Gerard Brucelle	7
(France) Roland Bassaler	Sauber SHS C6	BMW M88 3.5 L I6	A	95	(France) Gérard Tremblay	7
(Japan) Mr S Racing Product	MCS Guppy	BMW M12 2.0 L I4	D	96	(Japan) Syuuji Fujii	9
(Japan) Mr S Racing Product	MCS Guppy	BMW M12 2.0 L I4	D	96	(Japan) Seiichi Sodeyama	9
(Japan) Mr S Racing Product	MCS Guppy	BMW M12 2.0 L I4	D	96	(Japan) Tooru Sawada	9
(Sweden) Strandell Motors	Strandell 85	Porsche 3.3 L Turbo Flat-6	A	97	(Sweden) Stanley Dickens	2–5
(Sweden) Strandell Motors	Strandell 85	Porsche 3.3 L Turbo Flat-6	A	97	(Norway) Martin Schanche	2–5
(Sweden) Strandell Motors	Strandell 85	Porsche 3.3 L Turbo Flat-6	A	97	(Sweden) Anders Olofsson	7
(Sweden) Strandell Motors	Strandell 85	Porsche 3.3 L Turbo Flat-6	A	97	(Sweden) Tryggve Gronvall	7
(United Kingdom) Roy Baker Promotions	Tiga GC284; Tiga GC285	Ford Cosworth BDT 1.8 L Turbo I4	A	98	(United Kingdom) Paul Smith	1–2, 5, 7–8
(United Kingdom) Roy Baker Promotions	Tiga GC284; Tiga GC285	Ford Cosworth BDT 1.8 L Turbo I4	A	98	(United Kingdom) Jeremy Rossiter	1
(United Kingdom) Roy Baker Promotions	Tiga GC284; Tiga GC285	Ford Cosworth BDT 1.8 L Turbo I4	A	98	(United Kingdom) Dudley Wood	1, 8
(United Kingdom) Roy Baker Promotions	Tiga GC284; Tiga GC285	Ford Cosworth BDT 1.8 L Turbo I4	A	98	(United Kingdom) Will Hoy	2–3, 5
(United Kingdom) Roy Baker Promotions	Tiga GC284; Tiga GC285	Ford Cosworth BDT 1.8 L Turbo I4	A	98	(United Kingdom) Roy Baker	2, 6, 9–10
(United Kingdom) Roy Baker Promotions	Tiga GC284; Tiga GC285	Ford Cosworth BDT 1.8 L Turbo I4	A	98	(Denmark) Thorkild Thyrring	3, 5
(United Kingdom) Roy Baker Promotions	Tiga GC284; Tiga GC285	Ford Cosworth BDT 1.8 L Turbo I4	A	98	(United Kingdom) David Andrews	4, 9
(United Kingdom) Roy Baker Promotions	Tiga GC284; Tiga GC285	Ford Cosworth BDT 1.8 L Turbo I4	A	98	(United Kingdom) Duncan Bain	4, 10
(United Kingdom) Roy Baker Promotions	Tiga GC284; Tiga GC285	Ford Cosworth BDT 1.8 L Turbo I4	A	98	(France) François Duret	4
(United Kingdom) Roy Baker Promotions	Tiga GC284; Tiga GC285	Ford Cosworth BDT 1.8 L Turbo I4	A	98	(United States) Chuck Grantham	6, 9
(United Kingdom) Roy Baker Promotions	Tiga GC284; Tiga GC285	Ford Cosworth BDT 1.8 L Turbo I4	A	98	(Canada) Joe DeMarco	6
(United Kingdom) Roy Baker Promotions	Tiga GC284; Tiga GC285	Ford Cosworth BDT 1.8 L Turbo I4	A	98	(United Kingdom) Mike Kimpton	7–8
(United Kingdom) Roy Baker Promotions	Tiga GC284; Tiga GC285	Ford Cosworth BDT 1.8 L Turbo I4	A	98	(United Kingdom) Andy Wallace	10
(United Kingdom) Roy Baker Promotions	Tiga GC284; Tiga GC285	Ford Cosworth BDT 1.8 L Turbo I4	A	99	(United Kingdom) Paul Smith	4–5
(United Kingdom) Roy Baker Promotions	Tiga GC284; Tiga GC285	Ford Cosworth BDT 1.8 L Turbo I4	A	99	(United Kingdom) Will Hoy	4, 8
(United Kingdom) Roy Baker Promotions	Tiga GC284; Tiga GC285	Ford Cosworth BDT 1.8 L Turbo I4	A	99	(United States) Nick Nicholson	4
(United Kingdom) Roy Baker Promotions	Tiga GC284; Tiga GC285	Ford Cosworth BDT 1.8 L Turbo I4	A	99	(United Kingdom) Roy Baker	5, 9–10
(United Kingdom) Roy Baker Promotions	Tiga GC284; Tiga GC285	Ford Cosworth BDT 1.8 L Turbo I4	A	99	(United Kingdom) Mike Kimpton	5
(United Kingdom) Roy Baker Promotions	Tiga GC284; Tiga GC285	Ford Cosworth BDT 1.8 L Turbo I4	A	99	(United Kingdom) James Rossiter	7
(United Kingdom) Roy Baker Promotions	Tiga GC284; Tiga GC285	Ford Cosworth BDT 1.8 L Turbo I4	A	99	(Denmark) Thorkild Thyrring	7
(United Kingdom) Roy Baker Promotions	Tiga GC284; Tiga GC285	Ford Cosworth BDT 1.8 L Turbo I4	A	99	(United Kingdom) Duncan Bain	8
(United Kingdom) Roy Baker Promotions	Tiga GC284; Tiga GC285	Ford Cosworth BDT 1.8 L Turbo I4	A	99	(United Kingdom) Mike Catlow	8
(United Kingdom) Roy Baker Promotions	Tiga GC284; Tiga GC285	Ford Cosworth BDT 1.8 L Turbo I4	A	99	(United States) Bill Bean	9
(United Kingdom) Roy Baker Promotions	Tiga GC284; Tiga GC285	Ford Cosworth BDT 1.8 L Turbo I4	A	99	(United Kingdom) David Palmer	10
(United Kingdom) Roy Baker Promotions	Tiga GC284; Tiga GC285	Ford Cosworth BDT 1.8 L Turbo I4	A	99	(Australia) Michael Hall	10
(United Kingdom) Bartlett Chevron Racing with Goodmans Sound	Chevron B62	Ford Cosworth DFL 3.3 L V8	A	100	(Morocco) Max Cohen-Olivar	4–8
(United Kingdom) Bartlett Chevron Racing with Goodmans Sound	Chevron B62	Ford Cosworth DFL 3.3 L V8	A	100	(United Kingdom) Robin Smith	4–6, 9–10
(United Kingdom) Bartlett Chevron Racing with Goodmans Sound	Chevron B62	Ford Cosworth DFL 3.3 L V8	A	100	(United Kingdom) Richard Jones	4–5, 7
(United Kingdom) Bartlett Chevron Racing with Goodmans Sound	Chevron B62	Ford Cosworth DFL 3.3 L V8	A	100	(Sweden) Stanley Dickens	6, 8
(United Kingdom) Bartlett Chevron Racing with Goodmans Sound	Chevron B62	Ford Cosworth DFL 3.3 L V8	A	100	(United Kingdom) John Bartlett	6
(United Kingdom) Bartlett Chevron Racing with Goodmans Sound	Chevron B62	Ford Cosworth DFL 3.3 L V8	A	100	(Sweden) Kenneth Leim	7, 9–10
(United Kingdom) Bartlett Chevron Racing with Goodmans Sound	Chevron B62	Ford Cosworth DFL 3.3 L V8	A	100	(United Kingdom) John Sheldon	8
(United Kingdom) Bartlett Chevron Racing with Goodmans Sound	Chevron B62	Ford Cosworth DFL 3.3 L V8	A	100	(Republic of Ireland) Martin Birrane	9
(United Kingdom) Bartlett Chevron Racing with Goodmans Sound	Chevron B62	Ford Cosworth DFL 3.3 L V8	A	100	(United Kingdom) Robin Donovan	10
(France) Ecurie Blanchet-Locatop	Rondeau M379C	Ford Cosworth DFV 3.0 L V8	A	104	(France) Michel Dubois	4–5
(France) Ecurie Blanchet-Locatop	Rondeau M379C	Ford Cosworth DFV 3.0 L V8	A	104	(France) Hubert Striebig	4–5
(France) Ecurie Blanchet-Locatop	Rondeau M379C	Ford Cosworth DFV 3.0 L V8	A	104	(France) Noël del Bello	4–5
(Denmark) Jens Nykjaer	Nykjaer	BMW 3.2 L I6	A	105	(Denmark) Jens Nykjaer	2, 5, 7
(Denmark) Jens Nykjaer	Nykjaer	BMW 3.2 L I6	A	105	(Denmark) Holger Knudsen	2, 5, 7
(Italy) Mario Fortina	Fortina	Lancia 1.4 L Turbo I4		106	(Italy) Mario Fortina	2
(Italy) Mario Fortina	Fortina	Lancia 1.4 L Turbo I4		106	(Italy) "Gimax"	2
(France) Bruno Sotty (West Germany) Motorsportclub Wasserburg	Lotec C302	Ford Cosworth DFV 3.0 L V8	D	106; 102	(West Germany) Kurt Hild	4–5
(France) Bruno Sotty (West Germany) Motorsportclub Wasserburg	Lotec C302	Ford Cosworth DFV 3.0 L V8	D	106; 102	(West Germany) Martin Wagenstetter	4–5
(France) Jean-Claude Ferrarin	Isolia 001	BMW M12/7 2.0 L I4	A	107	(France) Jean-Claude Ferrarin	7–8
(France) Jean-Claude Ferrarin	Isolia 001	BMW M12/7 2.0 L I4	A	107	(France) Lucien Rossiaud	7–8

== Season results ==
=== Races ===
Rnd	Circuit	C1 Winning Team	C2 Winning Team	Results
Rnd	Circuit	C1 Winning Drivers	C2 Winning Drivers	Results
1	Mugello	(Germany) Rothmans Porsche	(United Kingdom) Spice Engineering	Results
1	Mugello	(Belgium) Jacky Ickx (Germany) Jochen Mass	(United Kingdom) Gordon Spice (United Kingdom) Ray Bellm	Results
2	Monza	(Germany) Porsche Kremer Racing	(United Kingdom) Spice Engineering	Results
2	Monza	(Germany) Manfred Winkelhock (Switzerland) Marc Surer	(United Kingdom) Gordon Spice (United Kingdom) Ray Bellm	Results
3	Silverstone	(Germany) Rothmans Porsche	(United Kingdom) Ecurie Ecosse	Results
3	Silverstone	(Belgium) Jacky Ickx (Germany) Jochen Mass	(United Kingdom) Ray Mallock (United Kingdom) Mike Wilds	Results
4	La Sarthe	(Germany) Joest Racing	(United Kingdom) Spice Engineering	Results
4	La Sarthe	(Germany) Klaus Ludwig (Germany) "John Winter" (Italy) Paolo Barilla	(United Kingdom) Gordon Spice (United Kingdom) Ray Bellm (United Kingdom) Mark Galvin	Results
5	Hockenheimring	(Germany) Rothmans Porsche	(United Kingdom) Ecurie Ecosse	Results
5	Hockenheimring	(United Kingdom) Derek Bell (Germany) Hans-Joachim Stuck	(United Kingdom) Ray Mallock (United Kingdom) David Leslie (United Kingdom) Mike Wilds	Results
6	Mosport	(Germany) Rothmans Porsche	(United Kingdom) Spice Engineering	Results
6	Mosport	(United Kingdom) Derek Bell (Germany) Hans-Joachim Stuck	(United Kingdom) Gordon Spice (United Kingdom) Ray Bellm	Results
7	Spa-Francorchamps	(Italy) Martini Racing	(United Kingdom) Spice Engineering	Results
7	Spa-Francorchamps	(France) Bob Wollek (Italy) Mauro Baldi	(United Kingdom) Gordon Spice (United Kingdom) Ray Bellm	Results
8	Brands Hatch	(Germany) Rothmans Porsche	(United Kingdom) Ecurie Ecosse	Results
8	Brands Hatch	(United Kingdom) Derek Bell (Germany) Hans-Joachim Stuck	(United Kingdom) Ray Mallock (United Kingdom) Mike Wilds	Results
9	Fuji	(Japan) Hoshino Racing	(Japan) Auto Beaurex Motorsport	Results
9	Fuji	(Japan) Kazuyoshi Hoshino (Japan) Akira Hagiwara (Japan) Kenji Matsumoto	(Japan) Kazuo Mogi (Japan) Toshio Motohashi	Results
10	Shah Alam	(Germany) Rothmans Porsche	(United Kingdom) ADA Engineering	Results
10	Shah Alam	(Belgium) Jacky Ickx (Germany) Jochen Mass	(United Kingdom) Richard Piper (United Kingdom) Ian Harrower (United Kingdom) Evan Clements	Results

== Drivers Championship ==
Points were awarded to the drivers of the top 10 placed cars in the order of 20-15-12-10-8-6-4-3-2-1 and drivers of C2 cars were also awarded 2 bonus points if they finished in any of the top ten outright positions. However points were not awarded if a driver:

- drove more than one car in the race
- failed to drive the car for at least 30% of the distance
- drove a car which did not complete 90% of the winner's distance

All drivers were eligible to score points in the overall championship, but drivers of C2 class cars were also awarded points separately for their own title.

Only half points were awarded at Round 9 due to the race being stopped with less than 50% distance having been covered.

=== World Endurance Championship for Drivers ===
The 1985 FIA World Endurance Championship for Drivers was awarded jointly to Rothmans Porsche teammates Hans-Joachim Stuck and Derek Bell who shared a Porsche 962C throughout the season

=== Group C2 ===
The Group C2 title was awarded to Gordon Spice and Ray Bellm who shared a Tiga Ford entered by Spice Engineering.

== Teams Championship ==
Points were awarded to the top 10 finishers in the order of 20-15-12-10-8-6-4-3-2-1, however

- Teams were only given points for their highest finishing car; any other team cars were merely skipped in the points allocation
- Teams did not score points if the car did not complete 90% of the winner's distance.

All cars were eligible to score for their team in the overall championship, but C2 class cars were also awarded points separately for their own title.

Rounds 2, 8, and 10 were not part of the Teams Championship and counted only for the Drivers titles.

Only half points were awarded at Round 9 due to the race being stopped with less than 50% distance having been covered.

=== World Endurance Championship for Teams ===
Pos	Team	Chassis	Engine	Mug	Sil	LeM	Hoc	Mos	Spa	Fuj	Total
1	(Germany) Rothmans Porsche	Porsche 956B; Porsche 962C	Porsche 2.6L Turbo Flat-6	20	20	12	20	20	15		107
2	(Italy) Martini Lancia	Lancia LC2	Ferrari 308C 3.0L Turbo V8	10	12	6	10		20		58
3	(Germany) New-Man Joest Racing	Porsche 956B	Porsche 2.6L Turbo Flat-6		6	20	12		12		50
4	(Germany) Kremer Porsche Racing	Porsche 956B; Porsche 962C	Porsche 2.6L Turbo Flat-6	15	10	8		10			43
5	(United Kingdom) Richard Lloyd Racing with Porsche	Porsche 956B; Porsche 956B GTi	Porsche 2.6L Turbo Flat-6		8	15	8				31
6	(Switzerland) Brun Motorsport	Porsche 956B; Porsche 962C	Porsche 2.6L Turbo Flat-6	12	1		15				28
7	(United Kingdom) Jaguar	Jaguar XJR-6	Jaguar 6.2L V12					12	8		20
8	(Germany) Obermaier Racing Team	Porsche 956B	Porsche 2.6L Turbo Flat-6	6	4	3	4		3		20
9	(United Kingdom) Spice Engineering	Tiga GC84; Spice-Tiga GC85	Ford Cosworth DFV 3.0L V8; Ford Cosworth DFL 3.3L V8	4			2	8	2		16
10	(United Kingdom) John Fitzpatrick Racing	Porsche 956B	Porsche 2.6L Turbo Flat-6			10					10
10	(Japan) Hoshino Racing	March 85G	Nissan							10	10
12	(Japan) Panasport Nissan	LM 05C	Nissan							7.5	7.5
13	(Germany) Team Labatts	Gebhardt JC843; Gebhardt JC853	BMW 3.5L I6; Ford Cosworth DFL 3.3L V8					6			6
13	(Japan) Tom's Co Ltd	Tom's 85c	Toyota							6	6
15	Auto Beaurex Motor Sport	Tom's 85c	Toyota							5	5
16	(United Kingdom) Ecurie Ecosse	Ecosse C285	Ford Cosworth DFV 3.0L V8; Ford Cosworth DFL 3.3L V8			2		3			5
17	Bierl Racing	Sauber C7	Chevrolet					4			4
17	Cosmik Racing Promotion	March 84G	Porsche						4		4
17	Hasemi Motor Sport	March 85G	Nissan							4	4
20	(Italy) Carma F.F.	Alba AR2; Alba AR6	Carma FF 1.9L Turbo I4	3			1				4
21	(United Kingdom) Ark Racing / Arthur Houghs Pressing	Ceekar 83J	Ford Cosworth BDX 2.0L I4					3			3
21	(Japan) Trust Racing Team	Porsche 956	Porsche 2.6L Turbo Flat-6							3	3
23	(Denmark) Jens Winther Danmark	URD C83	BMW 3.5L I6	2							2
23	English Enterprises	Chevrolet Camaro	Chevrolet					2			2
23	Misaki Speed	Tom's 85B	Toyota							2	2
26	Central 20 Racing Team	Lola T810	Nissan							1.5	1.5
27	"Victor" / V Coggiola	Porsche 935	Porsche	1							1
27	Cheetah Automobiles	Cheetah G604	Aston Martin						1		1
27	Dome Co Ltd	Dome 85C	Toyota							1	1
30	Team Ikuzawa	Tom's 85C	Toyota							0.5	0.5

=== Group C2 Prototype FIA Cup ===
Pos	Team	Chassis	Engine	Mug	Sil	LeM	Hoc	Mos	Spa	Fuj	Total
1	(United Kingdom) Spice Engineering	Tiga GC84; Spice-Tiga GC85	Ford Cosworth DFV 3.0L V8; Ford Cosworth DFL 3.3L V8	20	15	20	15	20	20		110
2	(United Kingdom) Ecurie Ecosse	Ecosse C285	Ford Cosworth DFV 3.0L V8; Ford Cosworth DFL 3.3L V8		20		20		10		50
3	(United Kingdom) Ark Racing / Arthur Houghs Pressing	Ceekar 83J	Ford Cosworth BDX 2.0L I4	10	8		10	12	6		46
4	(Denmark) Jens Winther Danmark	URD C83	BMW 3.5L I6	12			8		12		32
5	(Italy) Carma F.F.	Alba AR2; Alba AR6	Carma FF 1.9L Turbo I4	15	4		12				31
6	(Germany) Team Labatts	Gebhardt JC843; Gebhardt JC853	BMW 3.5L I6; Ford Cosworth DFL 3.3L V8					15	15		30
7	(United Kingdom) Roy Baker Promotions Ford	Tiga GC284; Tiga GC285	Ford BDT 1.7L Turbo I4	8		10			2		20
8	(Japan) Mazdaspeed	Mazda 737C	Mazda 13B 1.3L 2-Rotor		6	12					18
9	(United Kingdom) ADA Engineering	Gebhardt JC843	Ford Cosworth DFL 3.3L V8			15					15
10	(Sweden) Strandell Motors	Standell 85	Porsche 3.3L Turbo Flat-6		12						12
11	Raymond Bassaler	Sauber SHS C6	BMW			8			4		12
12	Gebhardt Motorsport	Gebhardt JC853	Ford		10						10
12	Auto Beaurex Motor Sport	Lotec M1C	BMW							10	10
14	Grifo Autoracing	Alba AR3	Ford						8		8
15	MRS Racing Products	Mazda RX-7 254	Mazda						7.5		7.5
16	Bartlett Chevron Racing with Goodmans Sound	Chevron B62	Ford				6				6
17	Jens Nykjaer	Nykjaer	BMW						3		3

=== FIA Grand Touring Cup ===
Pos	Team	Chassis	Engine	Mug	Sil	LeM	Hoc	Mos	Spa	Fuj	Total
1	(Germany) Helmut Gall	BMW M1	BMW 3.5L I6	20		20	20				60
2	English Enterprises	Chevrolet Camaro	Chevrolet					20			20
3	Bauerle Farben Team	BMW M1	BMW 3.5L I6				15				15
=	Zwiren Racing	Mazda RX-7	Mazda					15			15
5	Vogelsang Autombil	BMW M1	BMW 3.5L I6				12				12
6	Trust Racing Team	Toyota Celica	Toyota							10	10
