= 1985 1000 km of Monza =

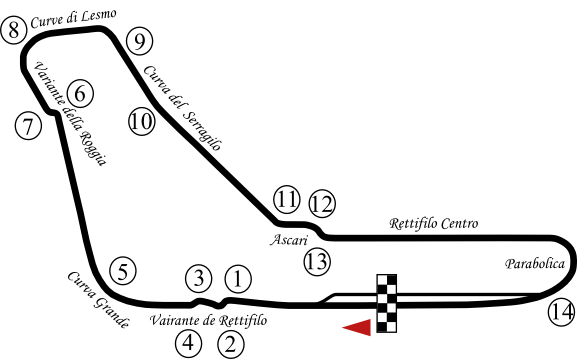
Layout of the Autodromo Nazionale di Monza (1976-1993)

The 1985 Trofeo Filippo Caracciolo was the second round of the 1985 World Endurance Championship. It took place at the Autodromo Nazionale Monza, Italy on April 28, 1985.

Although scheduled for 173 laps (1000 km), the race was stopped after 138 laps due to a tree falling and blocking the circuit.

== Official results ==
Class winners in bold. Cars failing to complete 75% of the winner's distance marked as Not Classified (NC).

Pos	Class	No	Team	Drivers	Chassis	Tyre	Laps
Pos	Class	No	Team	Drivers	Engine	Tyre	Laps
1	**C1**	**10**	**(Germany) Porsche Kremer Racing**	**(Germany) Manfred Winkelhock (Switzerland) Marc Surer**	**Porsche 962C**	**G**	**138**
1	**C1**	**10**	**(Germany) Porsche Kremer Racing**	**(Germany) Manfred Winkelhock (Switzerland) Marc Surer**	**Porsche Type-935 2.6 L Turbo Flat-6**	**G**	**138**
2	C1	3	(Germany) Rothmans Porsche	(Germany) Hans-Joachim Stuck (United Kingdom) Derek Bell	Porsche 962C	**D**	138
2	C1	3	(Germany) Rothmans Porsche	(Germany) Hans-Joachim Stuck (United Kingdom) Derek Bell	Porsche Type-935 2.6 L Turbo Flat-6	**D**	138
3	C1	4	(Italy) Martini Racing	(Italy) Riccardo Patrese (Italy) Alessandro Nannini	Lancia LC2	**MI**	138
3	C1	4	(Italy) Martini Racing	(Italy) Riccardo Patrese (Italy) Alessandro Nannini	Ferrari 308C 3.0 L Turbo V8	**MI**	138
4	C1	1	(Germany) Rothmans Porsche	(Germany) Jochen Mass (Belgium) Jacky Ickx	Porsche 962C	**D**	138
4	C1	1	(Germany) Rothmans Porsche	(Germany) Jochen Mass (Belgium) Jacky Ickx	Porsche Type-935 2.6 L Turbo Flat-6	**D**	138
5	C1	14	(United Kingdom) GTi Engineering	(United Kingdom) Jonathan Palmer (Netherlands) Jan Lammers	Porsche 956 GTi	**G**	132
5	C1	14	(United Kingdom) GTi Engineering	(United Kingdom) Jonathan Palmer (Netherlands) Jan Lammers	Porsche Type-935 2.6 L Turbo Flat-6	**G**	132
6	C1	19	(Switzerland) Brun Motorsport	(Argentina) Oscar Larrauri (Italy) Massimo Sigala (Italy) Renzo Zorzi	Porsche 956	**D**	129
6	C1	19	(Switzerland) Brun Motorsport	(Argentina) Oscar Larrauri (Italy) Massimo Sigala (Italy) Renzo Zorzi	Porsche Type-935 2.6 L Turbo Flat-6	**D**	129
7	**C2**	**70**	**(United Kingdom) Spice Engineering**	**(United Kingdom) Gordon Spice (United Kingdom) Ray Bellm**	**Tiga-Spice GC85**	**A**	**127**
7	**C2**	**70**	**(United Kingdom) Spice Engineering**	**(United Kingdom) Gordon Spice (United Kingdom) Ray Bellm**	**Ford Cosworth DFL 3.3 L V8**	**A**	**127**
8	C1	11	(Germany) Porsche Kremer Racing	(South Africa) Sarel van der Merwe (South Africa) George Fouché (Italy) Bruno Giacomelli	Porsche 956B	**G**	126
8	C1	11	(Germany) Porsche Kremer Racing	(South Africa) Sarel van der Merwe (South Africa) George Fouché (Italy) Bruno Giacomelli	Porsche Type-935 2.6 L Turbo Flat-6	**G**	126
9	C1	7	(Germany) Joest Racing	(Germany) Hans Heyer (Italy) Paolo Barilla	Porsche 956	**D**	125
9	C1	7	(Germany) Joest Racing	(Germany) Hans Heyer (Italy) Paolo Barilla	Porsche Type-935 2.6 L Turbo Flat-6	**D**	125
10	C2	79	(United Kingdom) Ecurie Ecosse	(United Kingdom) Ray Mallock (United Kingdom) Mike Wilds	Ecosse C285	**A**	124
10	C2	79	(United Kingdom) Ecurie Ecosse	(United Kingdom) Ray Mallock (United Kingdom) Mike Wilds	Ford Cosworth DFV 3.0 L V8	**A**	124
11	C1	55	(United Kingdom) John Fitzpatrick Racing	(United Kingdom) Dudley Wood (Germany) Klaus Niedzwiedz (Peru) Manuel López	Porsche 956	**Y**	123
11	C1	55	(United Kingdom) John Fitzpatrick Racing	(United Kingdom) Dudley Wood (Germany) Klaus Niedzwiedz (Peru) Manuel López	Porsche Type-935 2.6 L Turbo Flat-6	**Y**	123
12	C2	90	Jens Winther Denmark	(Denmark) Jens Winther (United Kingdom) David Mercer	URD C83	**A**	112
12	C2	90	Jens Winther Denmark	(Denmark) Jens Winther (United Kingdom) David Mercer	BMW M88 3.5 L I6	**A**	112
13	C2	72	(Germany) Gebhardt Motorsport	(Germany) Günther Gebhardt (Germany) Frank Jelinski (Austria) Walter Lechner	Gebhardt JC842	**A**	111
13	C2	72	(Germany) Gebhardt Motorsport	(Germany) Günther Gebhardt (Germany) Frank Jelinski (Austria) Walter Lechner	Ford Cosworth DFV 3.0 L V8	**A**	111
14	**GTX**	**171**	**(Italy) "Victor"**	**(Italy) "Victor" (Italy) Aldo Bertuzzi (Italy) Gianni Giudici**	**Porsche 935**	?	**111**
14	**GTX**	**171**	**(Italy) "Victor"**	**(Italy) "Victor" (Italy) Aldo Bertuzzi (Italy) Gianni Giudici**	**Porsche Type-930 3.2 L Turbo Flat-6**	?	**111**
15	C2	75	(United Kingdom) ADA Engineering	(United Kingdom) Richard Jones (United Kingdom) Ian Harrower (United Kingdom) David Duffield	Gebhardt JC843	**A**	110
15	C2	75	(United Kingdom) ADA Engineering	(United Kingdom) Richard Jones (United Kingdom) Ian Harrower (United Kingdom) David Duffield	Ford Cosworth DFL 3.3 L V8	**A**	110
16	C1	33	(United Kingdom) John Fitzpatrick Racing	(Austria) Jo Gartner (United Kingdom) Kenny Acheson	Porsche 956B	**Y**	104
16	C1	33	(United Kingdom) John Fitzpatrick Racing	(Austria) Jo Gartner (United Kingdom) Kenny Acheson	Porsche Type-935 2.6 L Turbo Flat-6	**Y**	104
17	C2	88	(United Kingdom) Ark Racing	(United Kingdom) David Andrews (United Kingdom) Chris Ashmore (United Kingdom) Max Payne	Ceekar 83J	**A**	96
17	C2	88	(United Kingdom) Ark Racing	(United Kingdom) David Andrews (United Kingdom) Chris Ashmore (United Kingdom) Max Payne	Ford Cosworth BDX 2.0 L I4	**A**	96
18 DSQ^{†}	C1	18	(Switzerland) Brun Motorsport	(Germany) Stefan Bellof (Belgium) Thierry Boutsen	Porsche 962C	**D**	138
18 DSQ^{†}	C1	18	(Switzerland) Brun Motorsport	(Germany) Stefan Bellof (Belgium) Thierry Boutsen	Porsche Type-935 2.6 L Turbo Flat-6	**D**	138
19 DNF	C2	98	(United Kingdom) Roy Baker Promotions	(United Kingdom) Paul Smith (United Kingdom) Will Hoy	Tiga GC284	**A**	82
19 DNF	C2	98	(United Kingdom) Roy Baker Promotions	(United Kingdom) Paul Smith (United Kingdom) Will Hoy	Ford Cosworth BDT 1.8 L Turbo I4	**A**	82
20 DNF	C1	26	(Germany) Obermaier Racing Team	(Germany) Jürgen Lässig (Spain) Jesús Pareja (Belgium) Hervé Regout	Porsche 956	**G**	78
20 DNF	C1	26	(Germany) Obermaier Racing Team	(Germany) Jürgen Lässig (Spain) Jesús Pareja (Belgium) Hervé Regout	Porsche Type-935 2.6 L Turbo Flat-6	**G**	78
21 DNF	C2	80	(Italy) Carma F.F.	(Italy) Carlo Facetti (Italy) Martino Finotto (Italy) Guido Daccò	Alba AR2	**A**	60
21 DNF	C2	80	(Italy) Carma F.F.	(Italy) Carlo Facetti (Italy) Martino Finotto (Italy) Guido Daccò	Carma FF 1.9 L Turbo I4	**A**	60
22 DNF	C1	5	(Italy) Martini Racing	(Italy) Mauro Baldi (France) Bob Wollek	Lancia LC2	**MI**	46
22 DNF	C1	5	(Italy) Martini Racing	(Italy) Mauro Baldi (France) Bob Wollek	Ferrari 308C 3.0 L Turbo V8	**MI**	46
23 DNF	C2	81	(Italy) Carma F.F.	(Italy) Almo Coppelli (Switzerland) Loris Kessel (Switzerland) Jean-Pierre Frey	Alba AR6	**A**	35
23 DNF	C2	81	(Italy) Carma F.F.	(Italy) Almo Coppelli (Switzerland) Loris Kessel (Switzerland) Jean-Pierre Frey	Carma FF 1.9 L Turbo I4	**A**	35
24 DNF	C1	23	Cheetah Automobiles Switzerland	(Belgium) Bernard de Dryver (Italy) Gianfranco Brancatelli	Cheetah G604	**D**	3
24 DNF	C1	23	Cheetah Automobiles Switzerland	(Belgium) Bernard de Dryver (Italy) Gianfranco Brancatelli	Aston Martin-Tickford 5.3 L V8	**D**	3
25 DNF	C2	97	(Sweden) Bo Strandell	(Sweden) Stanley Dickens (Norway) Martin Schanche	Strandell 85	**A**	3
25 DNF	C2	97	(Sweden) Bo Strandell	(Sweden) Stanley Dickens (Norway) Martin Schanche	Porsche Type-934 3.3 L Turbo Flat-6	**A**	3
DNS	C2	105	(Denmark) Jens Nakjaer	(Denmark) Jens Nakjaer (Denmark) Holger Knadsen	Nakjaer	**A**	-
DNS	C2	105	(Denmark) Jens Nakjaer	(Denmark) Jens Nakjaer (Denmark) Holger Knadsen	BMW 3.2 L I6	**A**	-
DNS	C2	106	(Italy) Mario Fortina	(Italy) Mario Fortina (Italy) "Gimax"	Fortina (Chevron)	?	-
DNS	C2	106	(Italy) Mario Fortina	(Italy) Mario Fortina (Italy) "Gimax"	Lancia	?	-

† - #18 Brun Motorsport was disqualified for having refueled the car during a pit stop quicker than the regulations allowed.

== Statistics ==
- Pole Position - #4 Martini Racing - 1:31.00
- Fastest Lap - #4 Martini Racing - 1:40.04
- Average Speed - 196.264 km/h

World Sportscar Championship
Previous race: 1985 1000 km of Mugello	1985 season	Next race: 1985 1000 km of Silverstone
