= 1985 1000 km of Mosport =

Mosport Park

The 1985 Budweiser GT was the sixth round of the 1985 World Endurance Championship. Several teams from the Camel GT Championship also participated, under the GTP, GTO, and GTU classes. It took place at Mosport Park, Canada on August 11, 1985.

== Winkelhock accident ==
In the early portions of the race, Manfred Winkelhock was driving the Kremer Racing Porsche 962C after taking over from teammate Marc Surer. At the beginning of the car's 69th lap, Winkelhock's Porsche went off course during the long downhill Turn 2. The car hit the concrete barrier at the bottom of the hill head-on. Caution came out immediately and lasted for 56 minutes as safety crews attempted to extract Winkelhock from the wreckage.

Winkelhock was flown by medical helicopter to Sunnybrook Medical Centre near Toronto suffering from severe head trauma while the race resumed. Winkelhock died the following day after failing to recover from surgery.

== Official results ==
Class winners in bold. Cars failing to complete 75% of the winner's distance marked as Not Classified (NC).

Pos	Class	No	Team	Drivers	Chassis	Tyre	Laps
Pos	Class	No	Team	Drivers	Engine	Tyre	Laps
1	**C1**	**2**	**(Germany) Rothmans Porsche**	**(Germany) Hans-Joachim Stuck (United Kingdom) Derek Bell**	**Porsche 962C**	**D**	**253**
1	**C1**	**2**	**(Germany) Rothmans Porsche**	**(Germany) Hans-Joachim Stuck (United Kingdom) Derek Bell**	**Porsche Type-935 2.6 L Turbo Flat-6**	**D**	**253**
2	C1	1	(Germany) Rothmans Porsche	(Germany) Jochen Mass (Belgium) Jacky Ickx	Porsche 962C	**D**	253
2	C1	1	(Germany) Rothmans Porsche	(Germany) Jochen Mass (Belgium) Jacky Ickx	Porsche Type-935 2.6 L Turbo Flat-6	**D**	253
3	C1	52	(United Kingdom) TWR Jaguar	(France) Jean-Louis Schlesser (New Zealand) Mike Thackwell (United Kingdom) Martin Brundle	Jaguar XJR-6	**D**	234
3	C1	52	(United Kingdom) TWR Jaguar	(France) Jean-Louis Schlesser (New Zealand) Mike Thackwell (United Kingdom) Martin Brundle	Jaguar 6.2 L V12	**D**	234
4	C1	11	(Germany) Porsche Kremer Racing	(Canada) Ludwig Heimrath Sr. (Canada) Ludwig Heimrath, Jr. (Netherlands) Kees Kroesemeijer	Porsche 956	**G**	234
4	C1	11	(Germany) Porsche Kremer Racing	(Canada) Ludwig Heimrath Sr. (Canada) Ludwig Heimrath, Jr. (Netherlands) Kees Kroesemeijer	Porsche Type-935 2.6 L Turbo Flat-6	**G**	234
5	**C2**	**70**	**(United Kingdom) Spice Engineering**	**(United Kingdom) Gordon Spice (United Kingdom) Ray Bellm**	**Spice-Tiga GC85**	**A**	**231**
5	**C2**	**70**	**(United Kingdom) Spice Engineering**	**(United Kingdom) Gordon Spice (United Kingdom) Ray Bellm**	**Ford Cosworth DFL 3.3 L V8**	**A**	**231**
6	C2	74	(Germany) Gebhardt Motorsport	(Germany) Frank Jelinski (Canada) John Graham	Gebhardt JC853	**A**	225
6	C2	74	(Germany) Gebhardt Motorsport	(Germany) Frank Jelinski (Canada) John Graham	Ford Cosworth DFV 3.0 L V8	**A**	225
7	**GTP**	**18**	**(Canada) Bieri Racing (El Salvador) Fomfor Racing**	**(El Salvador) "Fomfor" (Canada) Uli Bieri (Canada) Matt Gysler**	**Sauber C7**	**G**	**211**
7	**GTP**	**18**	**(Canada) Bieri Racing (El Salvador) Fomfor Racing**	**(El Salvador) "Fomfor" (Canada) Uli Bieri (Canada) Matt Gysler**	**Chevrolet 6.0 L V8**	**G**	**211**
8	C2	88	(United Kingdom) Ark Racing	(United Kingdom) David Andrews (United Kingdom) Max Payne	Ceekar 83J	**A**	203
8	C2	88	(United Kingdom) Ark Racing	(United Kingdom) David Andrews (United Kingdom) Max Payne	Ford Cosworth BDX 2.0 L I4	**A**	203
9	**GTO**	**165**	**(United States) Gerry English**	**(United States) Gerry English (United States) Jerry Thompson**	**Chevrolet Camaro**	**HO**	**199**
9	**GTO**	**165**	**(United States) Gerry English**	**(United States) Gerry English (United States) Jerry Thompson**	**Chevrolet 6.0 L V8**	**HO**	**199**
10	**GTU**	**154**	**(United States) Zwiren Racing**	**(United States) Steve Zwiren (United States) Peter Dawe (Canada) Robert Peters**	**Mazda RX-7**	**HO**	**184**
10	**GTU**	**154**	**(United States) Zwiren Racing**	**(United States) Steve Zwiren (United States) Peter Dawe (Canada) Robert Peters**	**Mazda 13B 1.3 L 2-Rotor**	**HO**	**184**
11 DSQ^{†}	C2	80	(Italy) Carma F.F.	(Italy) Carlo Facetti (Italy) Martino Finotto (Switzerland) Jean-Pierre Frey	Alba AR6	**A**	218
11 DSQ^{†}	C2	80	(Italy) Carma F.F.	(Italy) Carlo Facetti (Italy) Martino Finotto (Switzerland) Jean-Pierre Frey	Carma FF 1.9 L Turbo I4	**A**	218
12 NC	C2	82	(Italy) Grifo Autoracing	(Italy) Pasquale Barberio (Italy) Maurizio Gellini	Alba AR3	**D**	157
12 NC	C2	82	(Italy) Grifo Autoracing	(Italy) Pasquale Barberio (Italy) Maurizio Gellini	Ford Cosworth DFL 3.3 L V8	**D**	157
13 NC	C1	34	(United Kingdom) Cosmik Racing	(Germany) Christian Danner (Greece) Costas Los (Sweden) Mikael Nabrink	March 84G	**Y**	148
13 NC	C1	34	(United Kingdom) Cosmik Racing	(Germany) Christian Danner (Greece) Costas Los (Sweden) Mikael Nabrink	Porsche Type-956 2.6 L Turbo Flat-6	**Y**	148
14 NC	C2	98	(United Kingdom) Roy Baker Promotions	(Canada) Joe DeMarco (United States) Chuck Grantham	Tiga GC285	**A**	146
14 NC	C2	98	(United Kingdom) Roy Baker Promotions	(Canada) Joe DeMarco (United States) Chuck Grantham	Ford Cosworth BDT 1.8 L Turbo I4	**A**	146
15 DNF	GTO	153	(Canada) No Team Name	(Canada) Rudy Bartling (Canada) Fritz Hochreuter	Porsche Carrera RSR	?	125
15 DNF	GTO	153	(Canada) No Team Name	(Canada) Rudy Bartling (Canada) Fritz Hochreuter	Porsche 3.0 L Flat-6	?	125
16 DNF	GTO	139	(Canada) R & H Racing	(Canada) Rainer Brezinka (Canada) Jack Burnett (Canada) John Centano	Porsche Carrera RSR	?	103
16 DNF	GTO	139	(Canada) R & H Racing	(Canada) Rainer Brezinka (Canada) Jack Burnett (Canada) John Centano	Porsche 3.0 L Flat-6	?	103
17 DNF	C1	10	(Germany) Porsche Kremer Racing	(Germany) Manfred Winkelhock (Switzerland) Marc Surer	Porsche 962C	**G**	69
17 DNF	C1	10	(Germany) Porsche Kremer Racing	(Germany) Manfred Winkelhock (Switzerland) Marc Surer	Porsche Type-935 2.6 L Turbo Flat-6	**G**	69
18 DNF	C2	100	(United Kingdom) John Barlett Racing	(Sweden) Stanley Dickens (United Kingdom) Robin Smith (Morocco) Max Cohen-Olivar	Chevron B62	**A**	27
18 DNF	C2	100	(United Kingdom) John Barlett Racing	(Sweden) Stanley Dickens (United Kingdom) Robin Smith (Morocco) Max Cohen-Olivar	Ford Cosworth DFL 3.3 L V8	**A**	27
19 DNF	C1	51	(United Kingdom) TWR Jaguar	(United Kingdom) Martin Brundle (New Zealand) Mike Thackwell	Jaguar XJR-6	**D**	12
19 DNF	C1	51	(United Kingdom) TWR Jaguar	(United Kingdom) Martin Brundle (New Zealand) Mike Thackwell	Jaguar 6.2 L V12	**D**	12

† - #80 Carma F.F. was disqualified after completing the final lap of the race too slowly.

== Statistics ==
- Pole Position - #2 Rothmans Porsche - 1:09.775
- Fastest Lap - #2 Rothmans Porsche - 1:12.915
- Average Speed - 168.886 km/h

World Sportscar Championship
Previous race: 1985 1000 km of Hockenheim	1985 season	Next race: 1985 1000 km of Spa
