= Mark Galvin =

Irish racing driver

Mark Galvin (born 22 June 1955) is an Irish former racing driver.

Galvin drove in the British Formula Three Championship from 1984 to 1987 as well as several other Formula Three series during 1987. He also competed in the World Sportscar Championship, driving a Spice-Tiga GC85 in the 24 Hours of Le Mans for Spice Engineering in 1985 and for Mazdaspeed in 1987 driving a Mazda 757.
