= Paul Smith (racing driver) =

British former racing driver (born 1955)

Paul Andrew Smith (born 29 October 1955) is a British former racing driver.

Smith competed in the 1980 British Formula One Championship.

== Racing record ==
=== Complete British Saloon Car Championship results ===
(key) (Races in bold indicate pole position; races in italics indicate fastest lap.)

Year	Team	Car	Class	1	2	3	4	5	6	7	8	9	10	11	Pos.	Pts	Class
1984	Terry Drury Racing	Alfa Romeo Alfetta GTV6	B	DON; 17	SIL; 12	OUL; 17	THR; 14	THR; 14	SIL ?	SNE; 9	BRH; Ret	BRH; 10	DON; 12	SIL; 10	14th	25	5th
