= Alba AR6 =

Sports car prototype Group C

The Alba AR6 was a Group C2 sports car prototype, designed, developed and built by Italian manufacturer Alba Engineering in 1985, to compete in the World Sportscar Championship, and used in sports car racing until 1990. A variant of the car, called the Alba AR8, was used in the IMSA GTP Championship.

== Development history and technology ==
In the development history of Alba, the typology of racing cars is confusing. In the short period from 1983 to 1985, five vehicle types were created, beginning with the AR2. The fifth in this series was the AR6, which was built in the spring of 1985 according to Group C2 technical regulations. The order to build it came from Martino Finotto, who wanted to replace his two AR2s with another new design. The 4-cylinder turbo engine developed in Finotto's and Carlo Facetti's joint venture CARMA was again used as the engine, the displacement of which was increased to 1.9 liters.

In the AR6, which was driven in the North American IMSA GTP series from 1986, there was an interesting engine variant. In 1981, Facetti and Finotto drove a Group 5 Ferrari 308GTB in the World Sportscar Championship. The powerplant, a 3-liter V8, was revised and carried over by Alba designer Giorgio Stirano into the IMSA car, which also had a longer wheelbase. It was evolved in 1987, into the Alba AR8. Designed to Jim Mullen's commission, it was equipped with a Buick V6 twin-turbo powertrain, which made a good 700 hp (520 kW), and drove the rear wheels through a five-speed Hewland VGC manual gearbox.

== Racing history ==
=== 1985 ===
The Finotto/Facetti AR6 had its first racing use at the 1000 km race in Monza. Their long-term partner Guido Daccò joined Finotto and Facetti in the team. In practice, the trio achieved the 13th time with 1:42.220 minutes and thus the fastest of all C2 vehicles. Riccardo Patrese's pole position time in the Lancia LC2/85 was twelve seconds short. The race ended prematurely due to a defective turbocharger. The first finish was in May 1985 at the Silverstone 1000 km with 17th place overall. The trio Finotto/Facetti/Daccò was at the wheel again. That was just seventh in the C2 class, 29 laps behind class winners Ray Mallock and Mike Wilds in the Ecosse C285. Finotto was extremely dissatisfied with the new car, but teammates Loris Kessel, Almo Coppelli, and Jean-Pierre Frey in the three-year-old AR2 did not finish 18th either, so that one had to hope for further development of the car.

At the fifth race of the season, after extensive testing, there were signs of improvement. The 1000 km race at Hockenheim ended with tenth place overall and third place in class.

The team achieved its best placing of the season at the Brands Hatch 1000 km race with eighth place overall and second place in the class rankings.

=== 1986-1990 ===
In 1986, in addition to the sports car world championship, an AR6 used by Gaston Andrey Racing was also used in the IMSA GTP series. From 1987, the AR6 with chassis number 005 was the only car of this racing type to compete in sports car racing, and that exclusively in North America. Best finishes that year were fifth place in the 1986 Road America 500 (Finotto and Ruggero Melgrati), sixth place in the 1987 Watkins Glen 500 km (Finotto and Daccò), and seventh place in the West Palm Beach 3-hour race in 1986 (Facetti and Melgarti).

Between 1986 and 1990 the AR6 entered by the Gaston Andrey Racing team in the IMSA GTP Lights won several races including the Palm Beach 1'GP and the Road America 500 miles in 1986 and other significant ones such as the Miami GP in 1988.
