= Hervé Regout =

Belgian racing driver (born 1952)

Hervé Regout (born 4 November 1952) is a Belgian racing driver.

Regout competed in the 24 Hours of Le Mans nine times between 1980 and 1994 and also competed in the 1979 British Formula One Championship.

== Le Mans 24 hours results ==
Year	Team	Co-Drivers	Car	Class	Laps	Pos.	Class Pos.
1980	(France) JMS Racing (France) Charles Pozzi	(Belgium) Jean Xhenceval (Belgium) Pierre Dieudonné	Ferrari 512BB/LM	IMSA	312	10th	3rd
1981	(France) Charles Pozzi S.A.	(France) Jean-Claude Andruet (France) Claude Ballot-Léna	Ferrari 512BB/LM	IMSA; GTX	328	5th	1st
1985	(Germany) Obermaier Racing Team	(Germany) Jürgen Lässig (Spain) Jesús Pareja	Porsche 956	C1	357	8th	8th
1987	(France) Primagaz Competition	(France) Pierre-Henri Raphanel (France) Yves Courage	Cougar C20	C1	332	3rd	3rd
1988	(Japan) Mazdaspeed Co. Ltd.	(Japan) Takashi Yorino (United Kingdom) Will Hoy	Mazda 767	GTP	305	19th	2nd
1989	(Japan) Mazdaspeed Co. Ltd.	(Japan) Takashi Yorino (United States) Elliott Forbes-Robinson	Mazda 767B	GTP	365	9th	2nd
1990	(France) Courage Compétition	(France) Alain Cudini (Greece) Costas Los	Nissan R89C	C1	300	22nd	20th
1993	(United Kingdom) Chamberlain Engineering	(United States) Andy Petery (United Kingdom) Nick Adams	Spice SE89C	C2	137	DNF	DNF
1994	(France) Welter Racing	(France) Jean-François Yvon (France) Jean-Paul Libert	WR LM93	LMP2	86	DNF	DNF
