= Max Payne (racing driver) =

British former racing driver (born 1940)

Max Payne (11 September 1940 - 12 January 2017) was a British racing driver.

Payne drove in the World Sports-Prototype Championship from 1982 to 1988, primarily for Ark Racing driving a Cosworth powered Ceekar chassis.
