= David Andrews (racing driver) =

British former racing driver

David Andrews (born 23 October 1939) is a British former racing driver.

Andrews competed part-time in the World Sportscar Championship from 1985 to 1988 and the IMSA Camel GTP Championship in 1986 and 1987.

== Overall Stats ==
David Andrews has entered 26 races:

races entered	26
Wins	0
Podiums	0
Pole positions	0
Fastest laps	0
Race win percentage	0%
Podium percentage	0%
