= 1985 800 km of Selangor =

Shah Alam Circuit

The 1985 Malaysia 800 Selangor was the tenth and final round of the 1985 World Endurance Championship. It took place at the Shah Alam Circuit, Malaysia on December 1, 1985.

== Official results ==
Class winners in bold. Cars failing to complete 75% of the winner's distance marked as Not Classified (NC).

Pos	Class	No	Team	Drivers	Chassis	Tyre	Laps
Pos	Class	No	Team	Drivers	Engine	Tyre	Laps
1	**C1**	**1**	**(Germany) Rothmans Porsche**	**(Germany) Jochen Mass (Belgium) Jacky Ickx**	**Porsche 962C**	D	**217**
1	**C1**	**1**	**(Germany) Rothmans Porsche**	**(Germany) Jochen Mass (Belgium) Jacky Ickx**	**Porsche Type-935 2.6 L Turbo Flat-6**	D	**217**
2	C1	51	(United Kingdom) TWR Jaguar	(Denmark) John Nielsen (New Zealand) Mike Thackwell (Netherlands) Jan Lammers	Jaguar XJR-6	D	217
2	C1	51	(United Kingdom) TWR Jaguar	(Denmark) John Nielsen (New Zealand) Mike Thackwell (Netherlands) Jan Lammers	Jaguar 6.0 L V12	D	217
3	C1	69	(Germany) Rothmans Porsche	(Australia) Vern Schuppan (United Kingdom) James Weaver	Porsche 956	D	208
3	C1	69	(Germany) Rothmans Porsche	(Australia) Vern Schuppan (United Kingdom) James Weaver	Porsche Type-935 2.6 L Turbo Flat-6	D	208
4	C1	33	(United Kingdom) John Fitzpatrick Racing	(Austria) Franz Konrad (Australia) Andrew Miedecke	Porsche 956B	Y	205
4	C1	33	(United Kingdom) John Fitzpatrick Racing	(Austria) Franz Konrad (Australia) Andrew Miedecke	Porsche Type-935 2.6 L Turbo Flat-6	Y	205
5	C1	18	(Switzerland) Brun Motorsport	(Argentina) Oscar Larrauri (Italy) Massimo Sigala (Germany) Frank Jelinski	Porsche 956	D	195
5	C1	18	(Switzerland) Brun Motorsport	(Argentina) Oscar Larrauri (Italy) Massimo Sigala (Germany) Frank Jelinski	Porsche Type-935 2.6 L Turbo Flat-6	D	195
6	**C2**	**75**	**(United Kingdom) ADA Engineering**	**(United Kingdom) Evan Clements (United Kingdom) Richard Piper (United Kingdom) Ian Harrower**	**Gebhardt JC843**	A	**191**
6	**C2**	**75**	**(United Kingdom) ADA Engineering**	**(United Kingdom) Evan Clements (United Kingdom) Richard Piper (United Kingdom) Ian Harrower**	**Ford Cosworth DFL 3.3 L V8**	A	**191**
7	C2	82	(Italy) Grifo Autoracing	(Italy) Pasquale Barberio (Switzerland) Jean-Pierre Frey (New Zealand) John Nicholson	Alba AR3	D	189
7	C2	82	(Italy) Grifo Autoracing	(Italy) Pasquale Barberio (Switzerland) Jean-Pierre Frey (New Zealand) John Nicholson	Ford Cosworth DFL 3.3 L V8	D	189
8	C1	34	(United Kingdom) Cosmik Racing	(Germany) Christian Danner (Greece) Costas Los	March 84G	Y	187
8	C1	34	(United Kingdom) Cosmik Racing	(Germany) Christian Danner (Greece) Costas Los	Porsche Type-956 2.6 L Turbo Flat-6	Y	187
9	C2	99	(United Kingdom) Roy Baker Promotions	(United Kingdom) David Palmer (Australia) Michael Hall	Tiga GC284	A	182
9	C2	99	(United Kingdom) Roy Baker Promotions	(United Kingdom) David Palmer (Australia) Michael Hall	Ford Cosworth BDT 1.8 L Turbo I4	A	182
10	C2	88	(United Kingdom) Ark Racing	(United Kingdom) David Andrews (United Kingdom) Max Payne	Ceekar 83J	A	175
10	C2	88	(United Kingdom) Ark Racing	(United Kingdom) David Andrews (United Kingdom) Max Payne	Ford Cosworth BDX 2.0 L I4	A	175
11	C2	100	(United Kingdom) Barlett Chevron Racing	(United Kingdom) Robin Smith (United Kingdom) Robin Donovan (Sweden) Kenneth Leim	Chevron B62	A	146
11	C2	100	(United Kingdom) Barlett Chevron Racing	(United Kingdom) Robin Smith (United Kingdom) Robin Donovan (Sweden) Kenneth Leim	Ford Cosworth DFL 3.3 L V8	A	146
12 DNF	C1	2	(Germany) Rothmans Porsche	(Germany) Hans-Joachim Stuck (United Kingdom) Derek Bell	Porsche 956 PDK	D	183
12 DNF	C1	2	(Germany) Rothmans Porsche	(Germany) Hans-Joachim Stuck (United Kingdom) Derek Bell	Porsche Type-935 2.6 L Turbo Flat-6	D	183
13 DSQ^{†}	C2	98	(United Kingdom) Roy Baker Promotions	(United Kingdom) Roy Baker (United Kingdom) Duncan Bain (United Kingdom) Andy Wallace	Tiga GC285	A	106
13 DSQ^{†}	C2	98	(United Kingdom) Roy Baker Promotions	(United Kingdom) Roy Baker (United Kingdom) Duncan Bain (United Kingdom) Andy Wallace	Ford Cosworth BDT 1.8 L Turbo I4	A	106
14 DNF	C2	74	(Germany) Gebhardt Motorsport	(Sweden) Stanley Dickens (Austria) Walter Lechner	Gebhardt JC853	A	58
14 DNF	C2	74	(Germany) Gebhardt Motorsport	(Sweden) Stanley Dickens (Austria) Walter Lechner	Ford Cosworth DFV 3.0 L V8	A	58
15 DNF	C1	52	(United Kingdom) TWR Jaguar	(Netherlands) Jan Lammers (Italy) Gianfranco Brancatelli	Jaguar XJR-6	D	19
15 DNF	C1	52	(United Kingdom) TWR Jaguar	(Netherlands) Jan Lammers (Italy) Gianfranco Brancatelli	Jaguar 6.0 L V12	D	19
DNS	C1	8	(Germany) Joest Racing	(Italy) Paolo Barilla (Germany) "John Winter"	Porsche 956	D	-
DNS	C1	8	(Germany) Joest Racing	(Italy) Paolo Barilla (Germany) "John Winter"	Porsche Type-935 2.6 L Turbo Flat-6	D	-

== Statistics ==
- Pole Position - #1 Rothmans Porsche - 1:21.330
- Fastest Lap - #1 Rothmans Porsche - 1:24.52
- Average Speed - 144.804 km/h

World Sportscar Championship
Previous race: 1985 1000 km of Fuji	1985 season	Next race: Last race of season Next race: 1986 Monza 360km
