= 1986 1000 km of Silverstone =

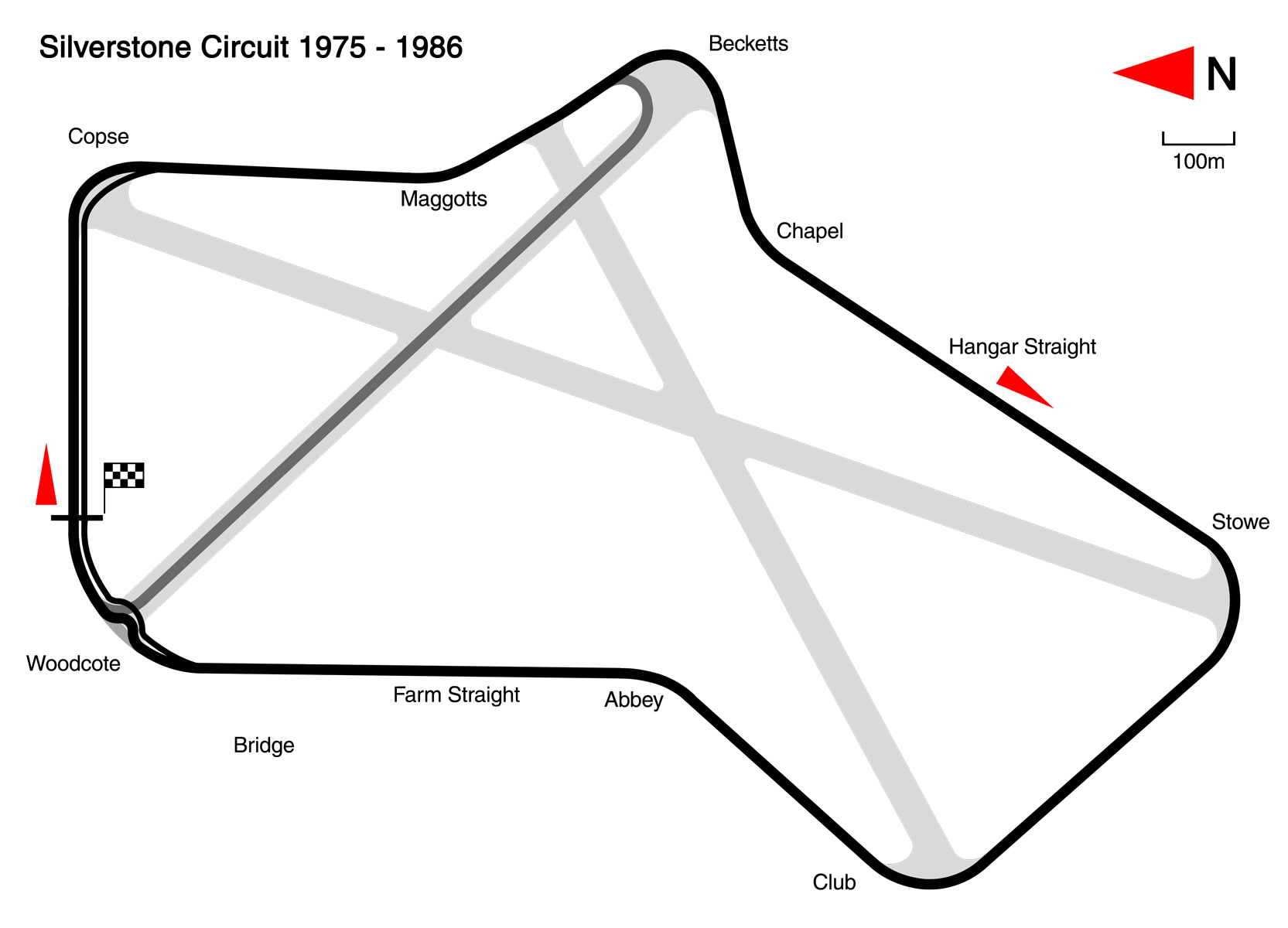
Map of the Silverstone Circuit (1975–1986)

The 1986 Kouros 1000 km was the second round of the 1986 World Sports-Prototype Championship. It took place at the Silverstone Circuit, Great Britain on 5 May 1986.

== Official results ==
Class winners in bold. Cars failing to complete 75% of the winner's distance marked as Not Classified (NC).

| Pos | Class | No | Team | Drivers | Chassis | Tyre | Laps |
| Pos | Class | No | Team | Drivers | Engine | Tyre | Laps |
|---|---|---|---|---|---|---|---|
| 1 | **C1** | **51** | **(United Kingdom) Silk Cut Jaguar** | **(United Kingdom) Derek Warwick (United States) Eddie Cheever** | **Jaguar XJR-6** | **D** | **212** |
| 1 | **C1** | **51** | **(United Kingdom) Silk Cut Jaguar** | **(United Kingdom) Derek Warwick (United States) Eddie Cheever** | **Jaguar 6.5L V12** | **D** | **212** |
| 2 | C1 | 1 | (Germany) Rothmans Porsche | (Germany) Hans-Joachim Stuck (United Kingdom) Derek Bell | Porsche 962C | **D** | 210 |
| 2 | C1 | 1 | (Germany) Rothmans Porsche | (Germany) Hans-Joachim Stuck (United Kingdom) Derek Bell | Porsche Type-935 2.6L Turbo Flat-6 | **D** | 210 |
| 3 | C1 | 10 | (Germany) Porsche Kremer Racing | (Austria) Jo Gartner (United Kingdom) Tiff Needell | Porsche 962C | **Y** | 207 |
| 3 | C1 | 10 | (Germany) Porsche Kremer Racing | (Austria) Jo Gartner (United Kingdom) Tiff Needell | Porsche Type-935 2.6L Turbo Flat-6 | **Y** | 207 |
| 4 | C1 | 14 | (United Kingdom) Liqui Moly Equipe | (United Kingdom) James Weaver (Germany) Klaus Niedzwiedz | Porsche 956 GTi | **G** | 206 |
| 4 | C1 | 14 | (United Kingdom) Liqui Moly Equipe | (United Kingdom) James Weaver (Germany) Klaus Niedzwiedz | Porsche Type-935 2.6L Turbo Flat-6 | **G** | 206 |
| 5 | C1 | 33 | (Spain) Danone Porsche España (United Kingdom) John Fitzpatrick Racing | (Spain) Emilio de Villota (Spain) Fermín Vélez | Porsche 956B | **G** | 206 |
| 5 | C1 | 33 | (Spain) Danone Porsche España (United Kingdom) John Fitzpatrick Racing | (Spain) Emilio de Villota (Spain) Fermín Vélez | Porsche Type-935 2.6L Turbo Flat-6 | **G** | 206 |
| 6 | C1 | 7 | (Germany) Joest Racing | (United States) George Follmer (United States) John Morton (Italy) Paolo Barilla | Porsche 956 | **G** | 205 |
| 6 | C1 | 7 | (Germany) Joest Racing | (United States) George Follmer (United States) John Morton (Italy) Paolo Barilla | Porsche Type-935 2.6L Turbo Flat-6 | **G** | 205 |
| 7 | C1 | 52 | (United Kingdom) Silk Cut Jaguar | (France) Jean-Louis Schlesser (Italy) Gianfranco Brancatelli | Jaguar XJR-6 | **D** | 204 |
| 7 | C1 | 52 | (United Kingdom) Silk Cut Jaguar | (France) Jean-Louis Schlesser (Italy) Gianfranco Brancatelli | Jaguar 6.5L V12 | **D** | 204 |
| 8 | C1 | 61 | (Switzerland) Kouros Racing Team | (France) Henri Pescarolo (Denmark) John Nielsen (New Zealand) Mike Thackwell | Sauber C8 | **G** | 203 |
| 8 | C1 | 61 | (Switzerland) Kouros Racing Team | (France) Henri Pescarolo (Denmark) John Nielsen (New Zealand) Mike Thackwell | Mercedes-Benz M117 5.0L Turbo V8 | **G** | 203 |
| 9 | C1 | 19 | (Switzerland) Brun Motorsport | (Switzerland) Walter Brun (Germany) Frank Jelinski | Porsche 956 | **MI** | 203 |
| 9 | C1 | 19 | (Switzerland) Brun Motorsport | (Switzerland) Walter Brun (Germany) Frank Jelinski | Porsche Type-935 2.6L Turbo Flat-6 | **MI** | 203 |
| 10 | C1 | 18 | (Switzerland) Brun Motorsport | (Argentina) Oscar Larrauri (Spain) Jesús Pareja | Porsche 962C | **MI** | 203 |
| 10 | C1 | 18 | (Switzerland) Brun Motorsport | (Argentina) Oscar Larrauri (Spain) Jesús Pareja | Porsche Type-935 2.6L Turbo Flat-6 | **MI** | 203 |
| 11 | C1 | 17 | (Switzerland) Brun Motorsport | (Italy) Massimo Sigala (Belgium) Thierry Boutsen | Porsche 962C | **MI** | 200 |
| 11 | C1 | 17 | (Switzerland) Brun Motorsport | (Italy) Massimo Sigala (Belgium) Thierry Boutsen | Porsche Type-935 2.6L Turbo Flat-6 | **MI** | 200 |
| 12 | C1 | 9 | (Germany) Obermaier Racing Team | (Germany) Jürgen Lässig (Italy) Fulvio Ballabio (United Kingdom) Dudley Wood | Porsche 956 | **G** | 195 |
| 12 | C1 | 9 | (Germany) Obermaier Racing Team | (Germany) Jürgen Lässig (Italy) Fulvio Ballabio (United Kingdom) Dudley Wood | Porsche Type-935 2.6L Turbo Flat-6 | **G** | 195 |
| 13 | **GTP** | **31** | **(Japan) Mazdaspeed Co. Ltd.** | **(Japan) Yoshimi Katayama (Japan) Yojiro Terada** | **Mazda 757** | **D** | **194** |
| 13 | **GTP** | **31** | **(Japan) Mazdaspeed Co. Ltd.** | **(Japan) Yoshimi Katayama (Japan) Yojiro Terada** | **Mazda 13G 2.0L 3-Rotor** | **D** | **194** |
| 14 | **C2** | **70** | **(United Kingdom) Spice Engineering** | **(United Kingdom) Gordon Spice (United Kingdom) Ray Bellm** | **Spice SE86C** | **A** | **192** |
| 14 | **C2** | **70** | **(United Kingdom) Spice Engineering** | **(United Kingdom) Gordon Spice (United Kingdom) Ray Bellm** | **Ford Cosworth DFL 3.3L V8** | **A** | **192** |
| 15 | C2 | 105 | (Italy) Kelmar Racing | (Italy) Pasquale Barberio (Italy) Maurizio Gellini (New Zealand) John Nicholson | Tiga GC85 | **A** | 187 |
| 15 | C2 | 105 | (Italy) Kelmar Racing | (Italy) Pasquale Barberio (Italy) Maurizio Gellini (New Zealand) John Nicholson | Ford Cosworth DFL 3.3L V8 | **A** | 187 |
| 16 | C2 | 75 | (United Kingdom) ADA Engineering | (United Kingdom) Evan Clements (United Kingdom) Ian Harrower | Gebhardt JC843 | **A** | 185 |
| 16 | C2 | 75 | (United Kingdom) ADA Engineering | (United Kingdom) Evan Clements (United Kingdom) Ian Harrower | Ford Cosworth DFL 3.3L V8 | **A** | 185 |
| 17 | C1 | 63 | (Germany) Ernst Schuster | (Germany) Ernst Schuster (Germany) Siegfried Brunn | Porsche 936C | **D** | 180 |
| 17 | C1 | 63 | (Germany) Ernst Schuster | (Germany) Ernst Schuster (Germany) Siegfried Brunn | Porsche Type-962 2.8L Turbo Flat-6 | **D** | 180 |
| 18 | C2 | 90 | (Denmark) Jens Winther | (Denmark) Jens Winther (United Kingdom) David Mercer | URD C83 | **A** | 177 |
| 18 | C2 | 90 | (Denmark) Jens Winther | (Denmark) Jens Winther (United Kingdom) David Mercer | BMW M88 3.5L I6 | **A** | 177 |
| 19 | GTP | 30 | (Japan) Mazdaspeed Co. Ltd. | (Japan) Takashi Yorino (Republic of Ireland) David Kennedy | Mazda 757 | **D** | 174 |
| 19 | GTP | 30 | (Japan) Mazdaspeed Co. Ltd. | (Japan) Takashi Yorino (Republic of Ireland) David Kennedy | Mazda 13G 2.0L 3-Rotor | **D** | 174 |
| 20 | C2 | 92 | (France) Automobiles Louis Descartes | (France) Louis Descartes (France) Jacques Heuclin | ALD 02 | **A** | 159 |
| 20 | C2 | 92 | (France) Automobiles Louis Descartes | (France) Louis Descartes (France) Jacques Heuclin | BMW M88 3.5L I6 | **A** | 159 |
| 21 NC | C2 | 84 | (United Kingdom) Simpson Engineering Ltd. | (United Kingdom) Richard Jones (United Kingdom) Robin Smith (Italy) Stefano Sebastiani | Simpson C286 | **A** | 136 |
| 21 NC | C2 | 84 | (United Kingdom) Simpson Engineering Ltd. | (United Kingdom) Richard Jones (United Kingdom) Robin Smith (Italy) Stefano Sebastiani | Ford Cosworth DFV 3.0L V8 | **A** | 136 |
| 22 DNF | C2 | 79 | (United Kingdom) Ecurie Ecosse | (United Kingdom) Ray Mallock (United Kingdom) Mike Wilds | Ecosse C286 | **A** | 159 |
| 22 DNF | C2 | 79 | (United Kingdom) Ecurie Ecosse | (United Kingdom) Ray Mallock (United Kingdom) Mike Wilds | Rover V64V 3.0L V6 | **A** | 159 |
| 23 DNF | C1 | 4 | (Italy) Martini Racing | (Italy) Andrea de Cesaris (Italy) Alessandro Nannini | Lancia LC2 | **MI** | 140 |
| 23 DNF | C1 | 4 | (Italy) Martini Racing | (Italy) Andrea de Cesaris (Italy) Alessandro Nannini | Ferrari 308C 3.0L Turbo V8 | **MI** | 140 |
| 24 DNF | C1 | 13 | (France) Primagaz | (France) Yves Courage (France) Pierre-François Rousselot | Cougar C12 | **MI** | 139 |
| 24 DNF | C1 | 13 | (France) Primagaz | (France) Yves Courage (France) Pierre-François Rousselot | Porsche Type-935 2.6L Turbo Flat-6 | **MI** | 139 |
| 25 DNF | C2 | 98 | (United Kingdom) Roy Baker Promotions | (United Kingdom) Duncan Bain (United Kingdom) David Andrews (Australia) Michael Hall | Tiga GC286 | **A** | 121 |
| 25 DNF | C2 | 98 | (United Kingdom) Roy Baker Promotions | (United Kingdom) Duncan Bain (United Kingdom) David Andrews (Australia) Michael Hall | Ford Cosworth BDT 1.7L Turbo I4 | **A** | 121 |
| 26 DNF | C2 | 74 | (Germany) Gebhardt Motorsport | (United Kingdom) Max Payne (Sweden) Stanley Dickens | Gebhardt JC853 | **A** | 113 |
| 26 DNF | C2 | 74 | (Germany) Gebhardt Motorsport | (United Kingdom) Max Payne (Sweden) Stanley Dickens | Ford Cosworth DFL 3.3L V8 | **A** | 113 |
| 27 DNF | C2 | 72 | (United Kingdom) John Bartlett Racing | (United Kingdom) Nick Adams (Morocco) Max Cohen-Olivar (Sweden) Kenneth Leim | Bardon DB1 | ? | 106 |
| 27 DNF | C2 | 72 | (United Kingdom) John Bartlett Racing | (United Kingdom) Nick Adams (Morocco) Max Cohen-Olivar (Sweden) Kenneth Leim | Ford Cosworth DFL 3.3L V8 | ? | 106 |
| 28 DNF | C1 | 2 | (Germany) Rothmans Porsche | (Germany) Jochen Mass (France) Bob Wollek | Porsche 962C | **D** | 81 |
| 28 DNF | C1 | 2 | (Germany) Rothmans Porsche | (Germany) Jochen Mass (France) Bob Wollek | Porsche Type-935 2.6L Turbo Flat-6 | **D** | 81 |
| 29 DNF | C2 | 88 | (United Kingdom) Arthur Hough Pressings (United Kingdom) Ark Racing | (United Kingdom) Chris Ashmore (United Kingdom) Mike Kimpton (France) Rudi Thomann | Ceekar 83J | **A** | 61 |
| 29 DNF | C2 | 88 | (United Kingdom) Arthur Hough Pressings (United Kingdom) Ark Racing | (United Kingdom) Chris Ashmore (United Kingdom) Mike Kimpton (France) Rudi Thomann | Ford Cosworth BDX 2.0L I4 | **A** | 61 |
| 30 DNF | C2 | 80 | (Italy) Carma F.F. SRL | (Italy) Carlo Facetti (Italy) Martino Finotto (Italy) Ruggero Melgrati | Alba AR6 | **A** | 60 |
| 30 DNF | C2 | 80 | (Italy) Carma F.F. SRL | (Italy) Carlo Facetti (Italy) Martino Finotto (Italy) Ruggero Melgrati | Carma FF 1.9L Turbo I4 | **A** | 60 |
| 31 DNF | GTP | 21 | (United Kingdom) Richard Cleare Racing | (United Kingdom) Richard Cleare (Austria) Franz Konrad | March 85G | ? | 40 |
| 31 DNF | GTP | 21 | (United Kingdom) Richard Cleare Racing | (United Kingdom) Richard Cleare (Austria) Franz Konrad | Porsche Type-962 3.2L Turbo Flat-6 | ? | 40 |
| 32 DNF | C1 | 66 | (United Kingdom) Cosmik Racing | (Greece) Costas Los (Canada) John Graham | March 84G | **A** | 24 |
| 32 DNF | C1 | 66 | (United Kingdom) Cosmik Racing | (Greece) Costas Los (Canada) John Graham | Porsche Type-935 2.6L Turbo Flat-6 | **A** | 24 |
| DNS | C2 | 77 | (United Kingdom) Chamberlain Engineering | (United Kingdom) Gareth Chapman (United Kingdom) Will Hoy (United States) Dan Murphy | Tiga TS85 | **A** | - |
| DNS | C2 | 77 | (United Kingdom) Chamberlain Engineering | (United Kingdom) Gareth Chapman (United Kingdom) Will Hoy (United States) Dan Murphy | Hart 418T 1.8L Turbo I4 | **A** | - |
| DNS | C2 | 78 | (United Kingdom) Ecurie Ecosse | (United Kingdom) Ray Mallock (United Kingdom) Mike Wilds | Ecosse C285 | **A** | - |
| DNS | C2 | 78 | (United Kingdom) Ecurie Ecosse | (United Kingdom) Ray Mallock (United Kingdom) Mike Wilds | Ford Cosworth DFL 3.3L V8 | **A** | - |
| DNS | C2 | 83 | (Italy) Techno Racing | (Italy) Luigi Taverna (Italy) Mario Sala (Switzerland) Marco Vanoli | Alba AR3 | **A** | - |
| DNS | C2 | 83 | (Italy) Techno Racing | (Italy) Luigi Taverna (Italy) Mario Sala (Switzerland) Marco Vanoli | Ford Cosworth DFL 3.3L V8 | **A** | - |
| DNS | C2 | 89 | (Norway) Martin Schanche Racing | (Norway) Martin Schanche (Norway) Birger Dyrstad (Norway) Torgye Kleppe | Argo JM19 | **G** | - |
| DNS | C2 | 89 | (Norway) Martin Schanche Racing | (Norway) Martin Schanche (Norway) Birger Dyrstad (Norway) Torgye Kleppe | Zakspeed 1.9L Turbo I4 | **G** | - |
| DNS | C2 | 99 | (United Kingdom) Roy Baker Promotions | (United Kingdom) John Sheldon (Denmark) Thorkild Thyrring | Tiga GC286 | **A** | - |
| DNS | C2 | 99 | (United Kingdom) Roy Baker Promotions | (United Kingdom) John Sheldon (Denmark) Thorkild Thyrring | Ford Cosworth BDT 1.7L Turbo I4 | **A** | - |
| DNQ | C2 | 91 | (United Kingdom) P.C. Automotive | (United Kingdom) Richard Piper (United Kingdom) David Brodie | Royale RP40 | ? | - |
| DNQ | C2 | 91 | (United Kingdom) P.C. Automotive | (United Kingdom) Richard Piper (United Kingdom) David Brodie | Mitsubishi 2.0L Turbo I4 | ? | - |

== Statistics ==
- Pole Position - Alessandro Nannini (#4 Martini Racing) - 1:10.810
- Fastest Lap - Andrea De Cesaris (#4 Martini Racing) - 1:13.950
- Average Speed - 207.739 km/h

World Sportscar Championship
| Previous race: 1986 360km of Monza | 1986 season | Next race: 1986 24 Hours of Le Mans |
