= 1986 1000 km of Brands Hatch =

Layout of the Brands Hatch (1976-1987)

The 1986 Shell Gemini 1000 km Brands Hatch was the fifth round of the 1986 World Sports-Prototype Championship, although it did not count towards the Teams' Championship. It took place at Brands Hatch, Great Britain on 20 July 1986.

== Official results ==
Class winners in bold. Cars failing to complete 75% of the winner's distance marked as Not Classified (NC).

Pos	Class	No	Team	Drivers	Chassis	Tyre	Laps
Pos	Class	No	Team	Drivers	Engine	Tyre	Laps
1	**C1**	**14**	**(United Kingdom) Liqui Moly Equipe**	**(France) Bob Wollek (Italy) Mauro Baldi**	**Porsche 956 GTi**	**G**	**236**
1	**C1**	**14**	**(United Kingdom) Liqui Moly Equipe**	**(France) Bob Wollek (Italy) Mauro Baldi**	**Porsche Type-935 2.6L Turbo Flat-6**	**G**	**236**
2	C1	7	(Germany) Joest Racing	(Germany) Klaus Ludwig (Germany) Hans-Joachim Stuck (United Kingdom) Derek Bell	Porsche 956B	**G**	232
2	C1	7	(Germany) Joest Racing	(Germany) Klaus Ludwig (Germany) Hans-Joachim Stuck (United Kingdom) Derek Bell	Porsche Type-935 2.6L Turbo Flat-6	**G**	232
3	C1	19	(Switzerland) Brun Motorsport	(Belgium) Thierry Boutsen (Germany) Frank Jelinski	Porsche 956	**MI**	231
3	C1	19	(Switzerland) Brun Motorsport	(Belgium) Thierry Boutsen (Germany) Frank Jelinski	Porsche Type-935 2.6L Turbo Flat-6	**MI**	231
4	C1	53	(United Kingdom) Silk Cut Jaguar	(France) Jean-Louis Schlesser (United Kingdom) Derek Warwick	Jaguar XJR-6	**D**	231
4	C1	53	(United Kingdom) Silk Cut Jaguar	(France) Jean-Louis Schlesser (United Kingdom) Derek Warwick	Jaguar 6.5L V12	**D**	231
5	C1	8	(Germany) Joest Racing	(Germany) Klaus Ludwig (Germany) "John Winter" (Italy) Paolo Barilla	Porsche 956	**G**	230
5	C1	8	(Germany) Joest Racing	(Germany) Klaus Ludwig (Germany) "John Winter" (Italy) Paolo Barilla	Porsche Type-935 2.6L Turbo Flat-6	**G**	230
6	C1	51	(United Kingdom) Silk Cut Jaguar	(Italy) Gianfranco Brancatelli (United States) Eddie Cheever	Jaguar XJR-6	**D**	230
6	C1	51	(United Kingdom) Silk Cut Jaguar	(Italy) Gianfranco Brancatelli (United States) Eddie Cheever	Jaguar 6.5L V12	**D**	230
7	**C2**	**79**	**(United Kingdom) Ecurie Ecosse**	**(United Kingdom) Ray Mallock (United Kingdom) David Leslie**	**Ecosse C286**	**A**	**22**
7	**C2**	**79**	**(United Kingdom) Ecurie Ecosse**	**(United Kingdom) Ray Mallock (United Kingdom) David Leslie**	**Rover V64V 3.0L V6**	**A**	**22**
8	C1	9	(Germany) Obermaier Racing Team	(Germany) Jürgen Lässig (Italy) Fulvio Ballabio (United Kingdom) Dudley Wood	Porsche 956	**G**	220
8	C1	9	(Germany) Obermaier Racing Team	(Germany) Jürgen Lässig (Italy) Fulvio Ballabio (United Kingdom) Dudley Wood	Porsche Type-935 2.6L Turbo Flat-6	**G**	220
9	C1	66	(United Kingdom) Cosmic Racing Promotions	(Greece) Costas Los (United Kingdom) Tiff Needell	March 84G	**A**	219
9	C1	66	(United Kingdom) Cosmic Racing Promotions	(Greece) Costas Los (United Kingdom) Tiff Needell	Porsche Type-935 2.6L Turbo Flat-6	**A**	219
10	C2	105	(Italy) Kelmar Racing	(Italy) Pasquale Barberio (Italy) Maurizio Gellini (New Zealand) John Nicholson	Tiga GC85	**A**	209
10	C2	105	(Italy) Kelmar Racing	(Italy) Pasquale Barberio (Italy) Maurizio Gellini (New Zealand) John Nicholson	Ford Cosworth DFL 3.3L V8	**A**	209
11	C2	70	(United Kingdom) Spice Engineering	(United Kingdom) Gordon Spice (United Kingdom) Ray Bellm	Spice SE86C	**A**	204
11	C2	70	(United Kingdom) Spice Engineering	(United Kingdom) Gordon Spice (United Kingdom) Ray Bellm	Ford Cosworth DFL 3.3L V8	**A**	204
12	C2	90	(Denmark) Jens Winther	(Denmark) Jens Winther (United Kingdom) David Mercer	URD C83	**A**	195
12	C2	90	(Denmark) Jens Winther	(Denmark) Jens Winther (United Kingdom) David Mercer	BMW M88 3.5L I6	**A**	195
13	C2	98	(United Kingdom) Roy Baker Racing Tiga	(United Kingdom) Duncan Bain (United Kingdom) David Andrews	Tiga GC286	**A**	191
13	C2	98	(United Kingdom) Roy Baker Racing Tiga	(United Kingdom) Duncan Bain (United Kingdom) David Andrews	Ford Cosworth BDT 1.7L Turbo I4	**A**	191
14	C2	83	(Italy) Techno Racing	(Italy) Luigi Taverna (Italy) Toni Palma (Switzerland) Daniele Gasparri	Alba AR3	**A**	176
14	C2	83	(Italy) Techno Racing	(Italy) Luigi Taverna (Italy) Toni Palma (Switzerland) Daniele Gasparri	Ford Cosworth DFL 3.3L V8	**A**	176
15	C2	97	(United Kingdom) Roy Baker Racing Tiga	(United Kingdom) Val Musetti (Denmark) David Palmer	Tiga GC285	**A**	168
15	C2	97	(United Kingdom) Roy Baker Racing Tiga	(United Kingdom) Val Musetti (Denmark) David Palmer	Ford Cosworth BDT 1.7L Turbo I4	**A**	168
16	C2	77	(United Kingdom) Chamberlain Engineering	(United Kingdom) Gareth Chapman (United Kingdom) Will Hoy (United States) Dan Murphy	Tiga TS85	**A**	168
16	C2	77	(United Kingdom) Chamberlain Engineering	(United Kingdom) Gareth Chapman (United Kingdom) Will Hoy (United States) Dan Murphy	Hart 418T 1.8L Turbo I4	**A**	168
17	C2	95	(France) Roland Bassaler	(France) Dominique Lacaud (France) Pascal Pessiot (France) Roland Bassaler	Sauber SHS C6	**A**	168
17	C2	95	(France) Roland Bassaler	(France) Dominique Lacaud (France) Pascal Pessiot (France) Roland Bassaler	BMW M88 3.5L I6	**A**	168
18	C2	72	(United Kingdom) John Bartlett Racing	(United Kingdom) Robin Donovan (Morocco) Max Cohen-Olivar (Sweden) Kenneth Leim	Bardon DB1	?	165
18	C2	72	(United Kingdom) John Bartlett Racing	(United Kingdom) Robin Donovan (Morocco) Max Cohen-Olivar (Sweden) Kenneth Leim	Ford Cosworth DFL 3.3L V8	?	165
19 DNF	C1	18	(Switzerland) Brun Motorsport	(Argentina) Oscar Larrauri (Spain) Jesús Pareja	Porsche 962C	**MI**	204
19 DNF	C1	18	(Switzerland) Brun Motorsport	(Argentina) Oscar Larrauri (Spain) Jesús Pareja	Porsche Type-935 2.6L Turbo Flat-6	**MI**	204
20 DNF	C1	6	(Italy) Sponsor Guest Team	(Italy) Andrea de Cesaris (Italy) Bruno Giacomelli	Lancia LC2	**D**	156
20 DNF	C1	6	(Italy) Sponsor Guest Team	(Italy) Andrea de Cesaris (Italy) Bruno Giacomelli	Ferrari 308C 3.0L Turbo V8	**D**	156
21 DNF	C2	74	(Germany) Gebhardt Motorsport	(United Kingdom) Max Payne (United Kingdom) Nick Adams (Sweden) Stanley Dickens	Gebhardt JC853	**A**	149
21 DNF	C2	74	(Germany) Gebhardt Motorsport	(United Kingdom) Max Payne (United Kingdom) Nick Adams (Sweden) Stanley Dickens	Ford Cosworth DFL 3.3L V8	**A**	149
22 DNF	C2	102	(France) Lucien Rossiaud	(France) Lucien Rossiaud (France) Bruno Sotty (France) Noël del Bello	Rondeau M379C	**A**	133
22 DNF	C2	102	(France) Lucien Rossiaud	(France) Lucien Rossiaud (France) Bruno Sotty (France) Noël del Bello	Ford Cosworth DFV 3.0L V8	**A**	133
23 DNF	C1	17	(Switzerland) Brun Motorsport	(Italy) Massimo Sigala (Switzerland) Walter Brun	Porsche 962C	**MI**	107
23 DNF	C1	17	(Switzerland) Brun Motorsport	(Italy) Massimo Sigala (Switzerland) Walter Brun	Porsche Type-935 2.6L Turbo Flat-6	**MI**	107
24 DNF	GTP	21	(United Kingdom) Richard Cleare Racing	(United Kingdom) Richard Cleare (United Kingdom) James Weaver (France) Lionel Robert	March 85G	**G**	46
24 DNF	GTP	21	(United Kingdom) Richard Cleare Racing	(United Kingdom) Richard Cleare (United Kingdom) James Weaver (France) Lionel Robert	Porsche Type-962 3.2L Turbo Flat-6	**G**	46
25 DNF	C1	20	(United Kingdom) Tiga Team	(United Kingdom) Tim Lee-Davey (Australia) Lee Crang	Tiga GC86	**D**	41
25 DNF	C1	20	(United Kingdom) Tiga Team	(United Kingdom) Tim Lee-Davey (Australia) Lee Crang	Ford Cosworth DFL 3.3L Turbo V8	**D**	41
26 DNF	C2	99	(United Kingdom) Roy Baker Racing Tiga	(United Kingdom) John Sheldon (Denmark) Thorkild Thyrring	Tiga GC286	**A**	35
26 DNF	C2	99	(United Kingdom) Roy Baker Racing Tiga	(United Kingdom) John Sheldon (Denmark) Thorkild Thyrring	Ford Cosworth BDT 1.7L Turbo I4	**A**	35
27 DNF	C2	75	(United Kingdom) ADA Engineering	(United Kingdom) Evan Clements (United Kingdom) Ian Harrower	Gebhardt JC843	**A**	28
27 DNF	C2	75	(United Kingdom) ADA Engineering	(United Kingdom) Evan Clements (United Kingdom) Ian Harrower	Ford Cosworth DFL 3.3L V8	**A**	28
28 DNF	C2	92	(France) Automobiles Louis Descartes	(France) Louis Descartes (France) Jacques Heuclin	ALD 02	**A**	28
28 DNF	C2	92	(France) Automobiles Louis Descartes	(France) Louis Descartes (France) Jacques Heuclin	BMW M88 3.5L I6	**A**	28
29 DNF	C2	89	(Norway) Martin Schanche Racing	(Norway) Martin Schanche (Norway) Torgye Kleppe	Argo JM19	**G**	20
29 DNF	C2	89	(Norway) Martin Schanche Racing	(Norway) Martin Schanche (Norway) Torgye Kleppe	Zakspeed 1.9L Turbo I4	**G**	20
30 DNF	C2	84	(United Kingdom) Simpson Engineering Ltd.	(Republic of Ireland) Vivian Candy (United Kingdom) Robin Smith (Italy) Stefano Sebastiani	Simpson C286	**A**	0
30 DNF	C2	84	(United Kingdom) Simpson Engineering Ltd.	(Republic of Ireland) Vivian Candy (United Kingdom) Robin Smith (Italy) Stefano Sebastiani	Ford Cosworth DFV 3.0L V8	**A**	0
DNS	C1	33	(Spain) Danone Porsche España (United Kingdom) John Fitzpatrick Racing	(Spain) Emilio de Villota (Spain) Fermín Vélez	Porsche 956B	**G**	-
DNS	C1	33	(Spain) Danone Porsche España (United Kingdom) John Fitzpatrick Racing	(Spain) Emilio de Villota (Spain) Fermín Vélez	Porsche Type-935 2.6L Turbo Flat-6	**G**	-
DNQ	C2	104	(France) Jean-Claude Ferrarin	(France) Jean-Claude Ferrarin (France) Philippe Mazué	Isolia 001	?	-
DNQ	C2	104	(France) Jean-Claude Ferrarin	(France) Jean-Claude Ferrarin (France) Philippe Mazué	Ford Cosworth DFV 3.0L V8	?	-

== Statistics ==
- Pole Position - #7 Joest Racing - 1:16.270
- Fastest Lap - #14 Liqui Moly Equipe - 1:18.680
- Average Speed - 168.371 km/h

World Sportscar Championship
Previous race: 1986 100 Miles of Norisring	1986 season	Next race: 1986 360 km of Jerez
