= 1986 100 Miles of Norisring =

Layout of the Norisring

The 1986 200 Meilen von Nürnberg was the fourth round of the 1986 World Sports-Prototype Championship as well as the fourth round of the 1986 German Supercup. It took place at the Norisring temporary street circuit, West Germany on June 29, 1986.

== Official results ==
Class winners in bold. Cars failing to complete 70% of the winner's distance are marked as Not Classified (NC).

Pos	Class	No	Team	Driver	Chassis – Engine	Tyre	Laps
1	**C1**	**7**	**(Germany) Blaupunkt Joest Racing**	**(Germany) Klaus Ludwig**	**Porsche 956B**	**G**	**79**
2	C1	51	(United Kingdom) Silk Cut Jaguar	(United States) Eddie Cheever	Jaguar XJR-6	**D**	79
3	C1	52	(United Kingdom) Silk Cut Jaguar	(United Kingdom) Derek Warwick	Jaguar XJR-6	**D**	79
4	C1	38	(Germany) Team Memorex (Brun)	(Germany) Frank Jelinski	Porsche 962C	**MI**	78
5	C1	10	(Germany) SAT Porsche Kremer Team	(United Kingdom) James Weaver	Porsche 962C	**Y**	78
6	C1	17	(Switzerland) Brun Motorsport	(Switzerland) Walter Brun	Porsche 962C	**MI**	78
7	C1	9	(Germany) Hans Obermaier	(Germany) Jürgen Lässig	Porsche 956	**G**	77
8	C1	8	(Germany) Sachs Joest Racing	(Germany) "John Winter"	Porsche 956	**G**	76
9	**GTP**	**0**	**(Germany) Blaupunkt Joest Racing**	**(United States) Danny Ongais**	**Porsche 962**	**G**	**76**
10	C1	18	(Switzerland) Brun Motorsport	(Belgium) Thierry Boutsen	Porsche 956	**MI**	76
11	C1	33	(United Kingdom) John Fitzpatrick Racing	(United Kingdom) Derek Bell	Porsche 956B	**G**	76
12	C1	11	(Germany) SAT Porsche Kremer Team	(Austria) Franz Konrad	Porsche 956	**Y**	73
13	**C2**	**74**	**(Germany) Gebhardt Racing Cars**	**(Sweden) Stanley Dickens**	**Gebhardt JC853 – Ford**	**A**	**73**
14	C1	63	(Germany) Ernst Schuster	(Germany) Ernst Schuster	Porsche 936C	**D**	71
15	C1	1	(Germany) Porsche AG	(Germany) Hans-Joachim Stuck	Porsche 962C	**D**	71
16	C2	99	(United Kingdom) Roy Baker Racing Tiga	(Denmark) Thorkild Thyrring	Tiga GC286 – Ford	**A**	70
17	C1	53	(United Kingdom) Silk Cut Jaguar	(France) Jean-Louis Schlesser	Jaguar XJR-6	**D**	67
18	C2	89	(Norway) Martin Schanche Racing	(Norway) Martin Schanche	Argo JM19 – Zakspeed	**G**	66
19	C2	97	(United Kingdom) Roy Baker Racing Tiga	(United Kingdom) John Sheldon	Tiga GC285 – Ford	**A**	58
DSQ^{†}	C1	14	(United Kingdom) Liqui Moly Equipe	(France) Bob Wollek	Porsche 956 GTi	**G**	60
DNF	C1	6	(Italy) Sponsor Guest Team	(Italy) Bruno Giacomelli	Lancia LC2 – Ferrari	**D**	59
DNF	C1	66	(United Kingdom) Cosmik Racing	(Greece) Costas Los	March 84G – Porsche	**A**	58
DNF	C1	56	(Germany) Victor Zakspeed Team	(Germany) Jochen Dauer	Zakspeed C1/8 – Ford	**G**	37
DNF	C1	46	(Germany) Derichs Rennwagenbau	(Germany) Jan Thoelke	Zakspeed C1/8 – Ford	?	5

† #14 Liqui Moly Equipe was disqualified and no longer timed during the race after ignoring a black flag shown to the car. The car was black flagged for loose bodywork.

== Statistics ==
- Pole Position - #1 Porsche AG - 0:46.540
- Fastest Lap - #1 Porsche AG - 0:48.280
- Average Speed - 162.702 km/h

World Sportscar Championship
Previous race: 1986 24 Hours of Le Mans	1986 season	Next race: 1986 1000km of Brands Hatch

ADAC Supercup
Previous race: 1986 Supercup Hockenheim	1986 season	Next race: 1986 Supercup Nürburgring Supersprint
