= Hans-Joachim Stuck =

German racing driver (born 1951)

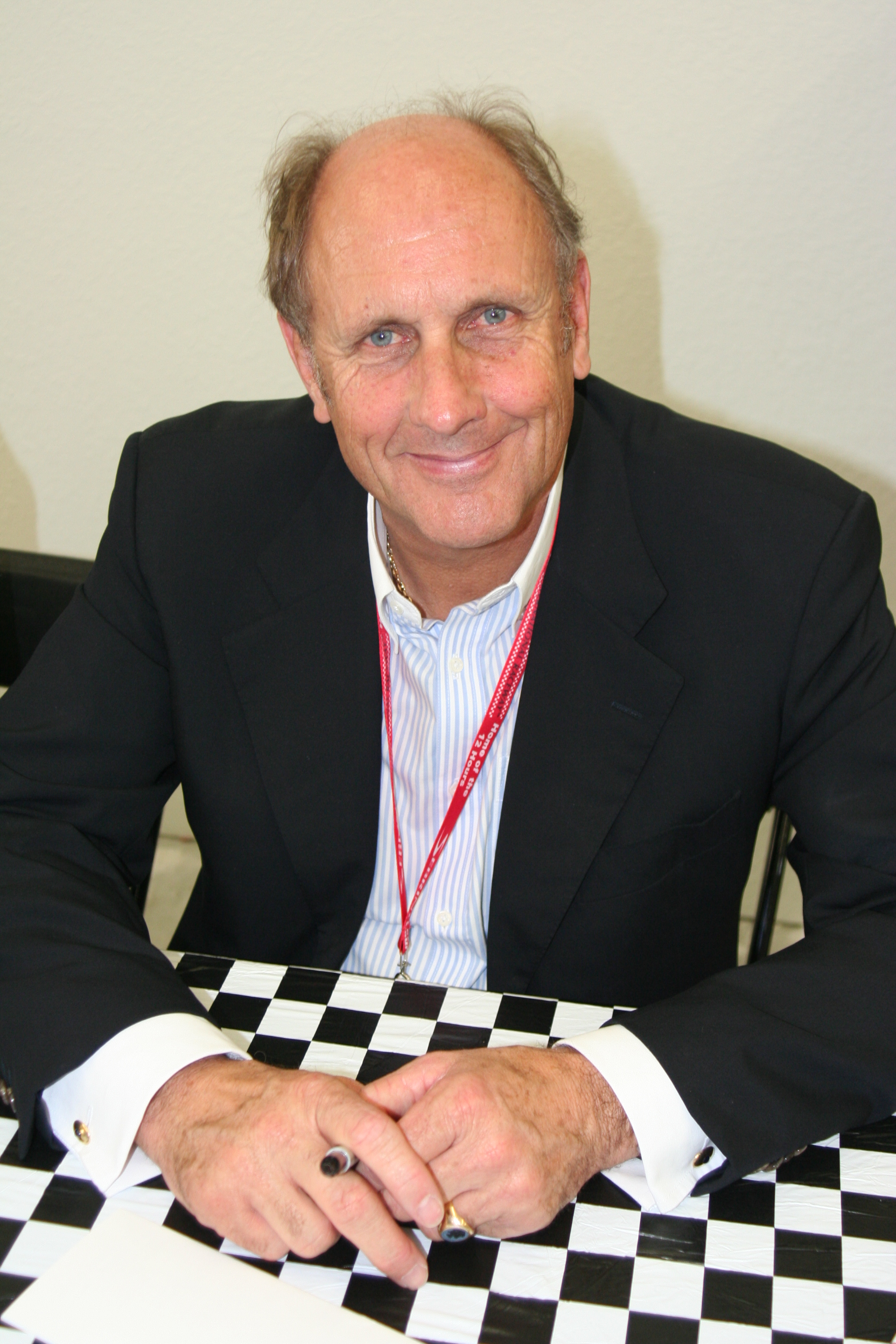
- Stuck in 2008
- Born: 1 January 1951 (age 75); Garmisch-Partenkirchen, Bavaria, West Germany
- Parent: Hans Stuck (father)

Formula One World Championship career
- Nationality: (West Germany) West German
- Active years: 1974–1979
- Team(s): March, Brabham, Shadow, ATS
- Entries: 81 (74 starts)
- Championships: 0
- Wins: 0
- Podiums: 2
- Career points: 29
- Pole positions: 0
- Fastest laps: 0
- First entry: 1974 Argentine Grand Prix
- Last entry: 1979 United States Grand Prix
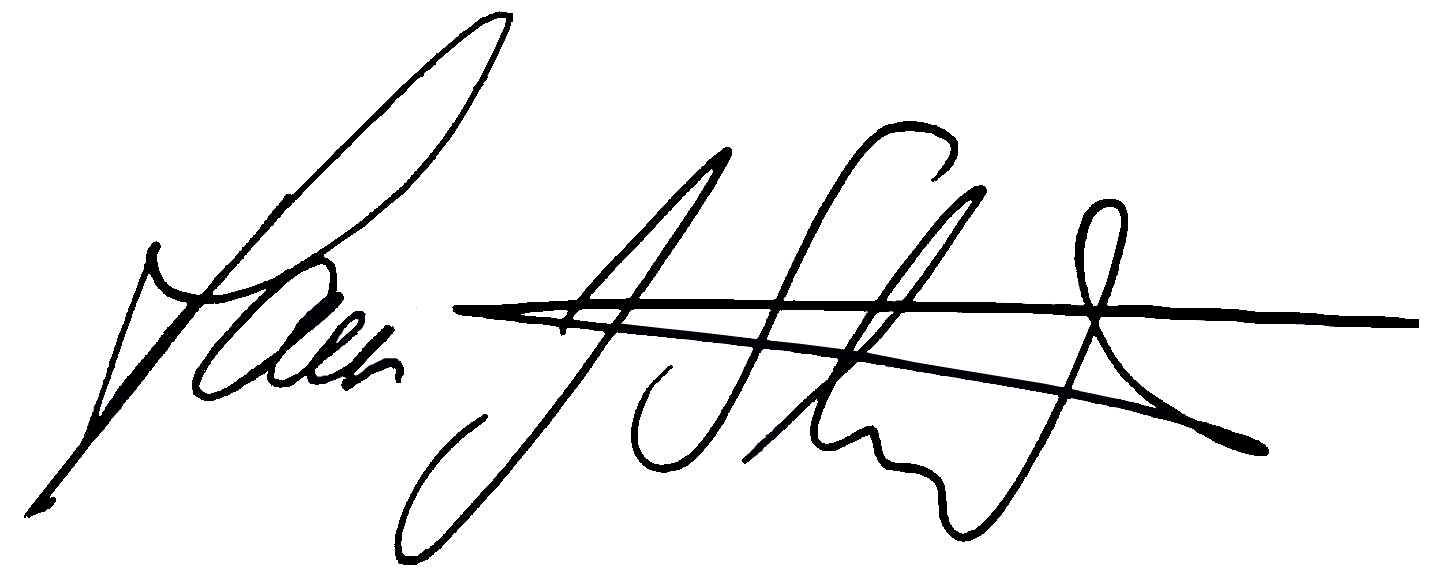
- Signature

World Sportscar Championship career
- Years active: 1970, 1972–1973, 1975, 1977–1978, 1980–1988, 1990–1991
- Teams: Ford, Alpina, BMW, Brun, BASF, Trust, Porsche, Joest
- Starts: 71
- Championships: 1 (1985) (Note: The World Endurance Championship for Drivers was only held from 1981 onwards.)
- Wins: 8
- Podiums: 24
- Poles: 9
- Fastest laps: 3

DTM career
- Years active: 1984, 1990–1992
- Teams: Brun, Schmidt
- Starts: 63
- Championships: 1 (1990)
- Wins: 11
- Podiums: 20
- Poles: 7
- Fastest laps: 8

24 Hours of Le Mans career
- Years: 1972–1973, 1980–1983, 1985–1991, 1993–1998
- Teams: Ford, BMW, BASF, Brun, Porsche, Joest, Konrad, Kremer
- Best finish: 1st (1986, 1987)
- Class wins: 3 (1986, 1987, 1996)

Hans-Joachim Stuck (German pronunciation: [hans ˈjoːaxɪm ʃtʊk]; born 1 January 1951) is a German former racing driver, who competed in Formula One from 1974 to 1979. Nicknamed "Strietzel", (Note: Stuck is nicknamed Strietzel after a local type of honey cake to Bavaria.) Stuck jointly won the World Endurance Championship for Drivers in 1985 and is a two-time winner of the 24 Hours of Le Mans in 1986 and 1987 with Porsche. In touring car racing, Stuck won the Deutsche Tourenwagen Meisterschaft in 1990.

Born in Bavaria, Stuck is the son of Grand Prix motor racing driver Hans Stuck, runner-up in the 1936 European Drivers' Championship. He began racing at the Nürburgring with his father throughout his childhood, winning the 24 Hours in 1970, aged 19. Stuck contested 81 Formula One Grands Prix between 1974 and 1979 for March, Brabham, Shadow, and ATS, achieving podium finishes at the German and Austrian Grands Prix in 1977 with Brabham.

Across a four-decade career in sportscar racing, Stuck took several major victories, including three at the Nürburgring 24 Hours, two at the 24 Hours of Le Mans, and one at the Spa 24 Hours. He took eight victories in the World Sportscar Championship for BMW and Porsche, winning the title in 1985 and finishing runner-up in 1986 with the latter, driving the 962C.

== Life and career ==
Stuck was born in Garmisch-Partenkirchen in Bavaria, and is the son of Christa Thielmann and the legendary 1930s Auto Union Grand Prix driver Hans Stuck. His father taught him to drive on the Nürburgring as a young boy. In 1969, he started his first ever motor race at the Nordschleife. Speaking about that day he said, "Getting to the grid was extremely exciting. All of a sudden, my wishes to become a racer came true. I just wanted to start the race and give everybody hell!" The following year, at just 19 years of age, he won his first 24 hours race at the wheel of a BMW 2002ti. He won there again in 1998 and 2004, too, each time with a BMW touring car.

In 1972, Stuck teamed up with Jochen Mass to drive a Ford Capri RS2600 to victory at the Spa 24 Hours endurance race in Belgium. His campaigns racing the BMW 3.0 CSL "Batmobile" were very successful in 1974 and 1975, in the German DRM as well as in the USA together with Ronnie Peterson. Later in the 1970s, he raced the turbo-charged BMW 320i.

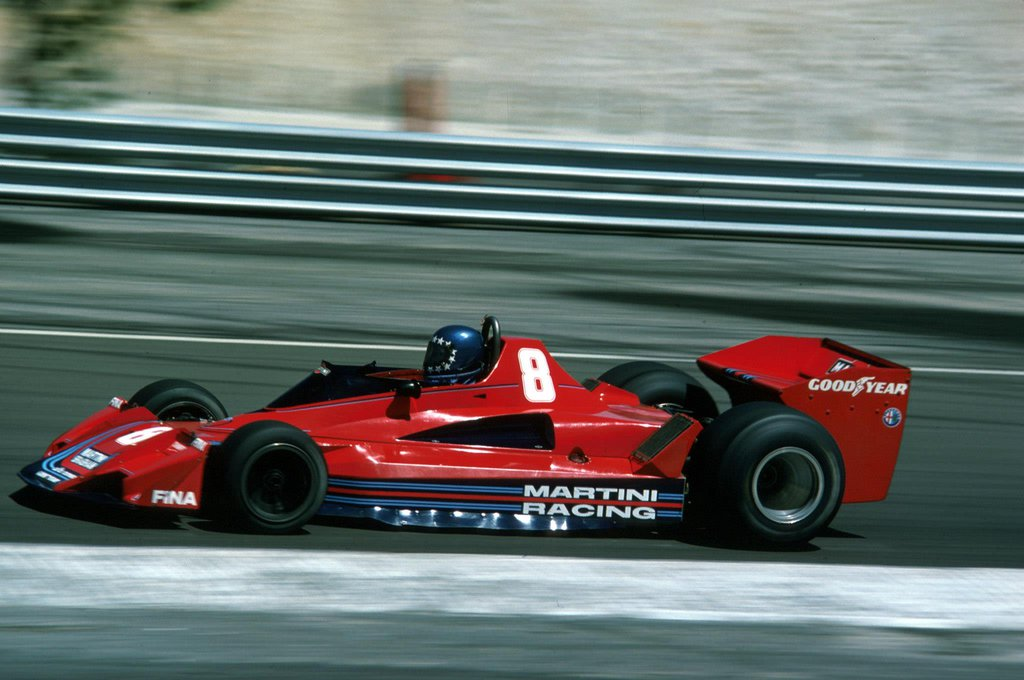
Stuck driving the Brabham BT45B at the 1977 French Grand Prix at Dijon-Prenois.

After some success in Formula 2 with a March-BMW, he also entered F1 with March. Overall, Stuck participated in 81 Grands Prix, debuting on 13 January 1974. He achieved two podiums and scored 29 championship points. Incidentally, Stuck was the first driver be born after the inaugural Grand Prix in 1950. Stuck was quite successful at Brabham-Alfa in 1977, leading the 1977 United States Grand Prix at Watkins Glen in the rain, but was replaced by Niki Lauda in 1978. Stuck missed an opportunity to join Williams F1 just before this team became successful.

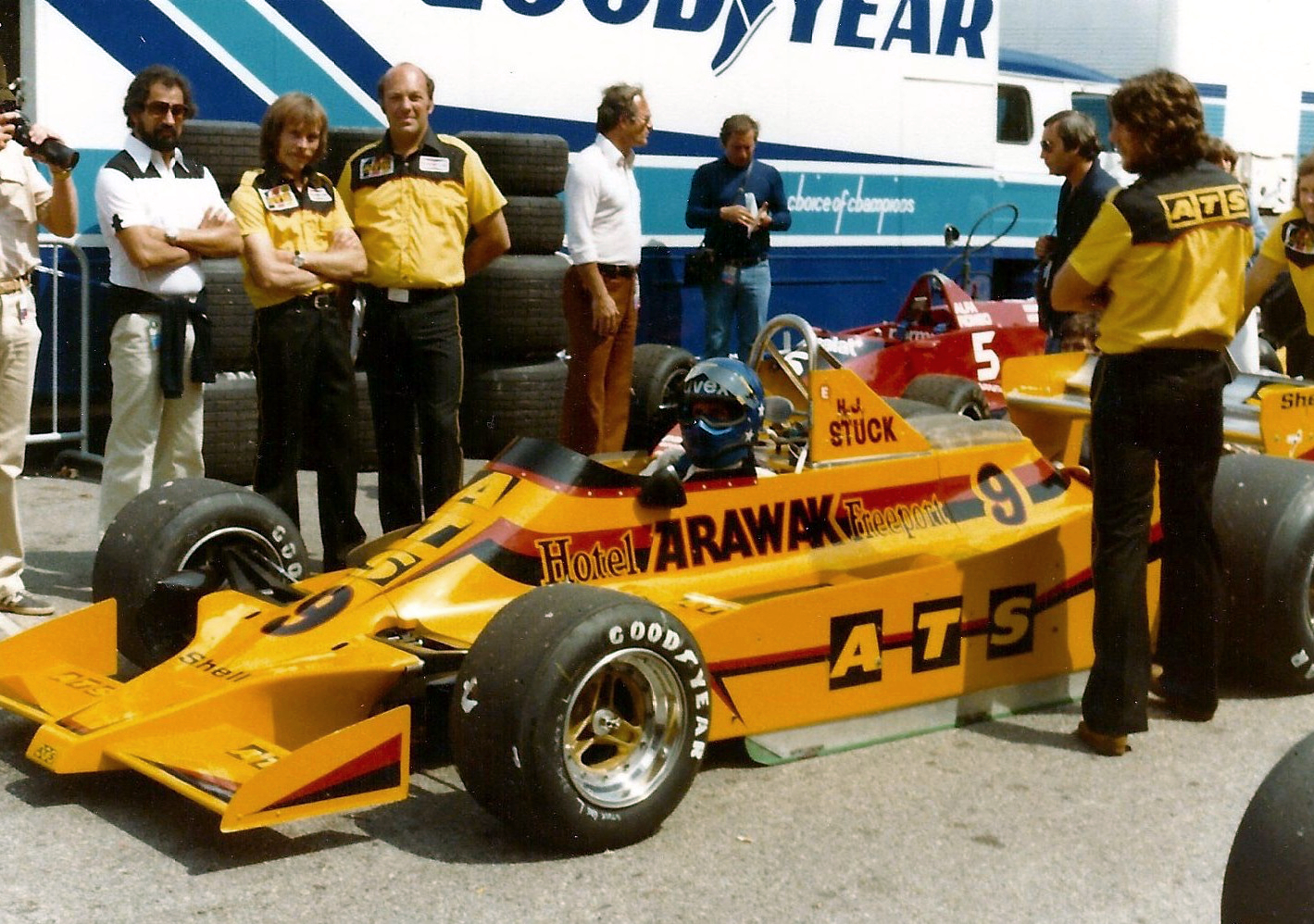
Stuck seated in an ATS D2 at the 1979 Monaco Grand Prix

Stuck continued racing touring and sports cars all over the world, winning the 24 Hours of Le Mans twice with a Porsche 962. Stuck says the 962 is the favourite racecar he has driven during his career, describing it as having the "perfect combination of power and downforce" and saying that he had "never sat in such a high-tech racing car as the Porsche 962C with the PDK semi-automatic transmission".

In the 1990s, Stuck tasted touring car success, winning the DTM Championship in 1990 with Audi, before returning to Porsche until the 24 Hours of Le Mans in 1998. He resumed an official role with BMW after that. In 2006, Stuck raced in the inaugural season of the Grand Prix Masters formula for retired Formula One drivers after scoring sixth in the first race event at the Kyalami circuit in South Africa on 11–13 November 2005.

January 2008 saw Stuck began his current position with Volkswagen Motorsport. This role has also seen him use his experience to help refine road cars, including the new Golf VI GTI.

Stuck announced the end of his 43 years active career as a race driver after the 2011 Nürburgring 24 Hours, in which he participated with a Reiter Engineering Lamborghini Gallardo LP600+ GT3 together with Dennis Rostek and his sons Ferdinand Stuck and Johannes Stuck. Team Stuck^{3} finished 15th overall following gearbox problems.

In April 2012, Stuck was elected President of the German Motorsport Association (Deutscher Motor Sport Bund).

== Racing record ==
=== Career summary ===
Season	Series	Team	Races	Wins	Poles	F/Laps	Podiums	Points	Position
1970	World Sportscar Championship	Oldenkott Pipe and Tobacco Racing	1	0	0	0	0	N/A	NC
1971	European Formula Two	Eifelland Wohnwagenbau	1	0	0	0	0	0	NC
1972	Deutsche Rennsport Meisterschaft	Zakspeed	8	7	?	7	8	201	**1st**
1972	European Touring Car Championship	Zakspeed	?	?	?	?	?	35	12th
1972	World Sportscar Championship	Ford Motorenwerke	2	0	0	0	0	0	NC
1972	24 Hours of Le Mans	Ford Motorenwerke	1	0	0	0	0	N/A	DNF
1973	European Touring Car Championship	BMW Motorsport	?	1	?	?	2	32	7th
1973	European Formula Two	March Racing Team	5	0	1	0	0	0	NC
1973	Deutsche Rennsport Meisterschaft	BMW Motorsport	5	1	?	3	1	40	10th
1973	World Sportscar Championship	BMW Alpina	3	0	0	0	0	0	NC
1973	World Sportscar Championship	BMW Motorsport GmbH	3	0	0	0	0	0	NC
1973	British Saloon Car Championship	BMW Motorsport	1	0	1	1	0	0	NC
1973	24 Hours of Le Mans	BMW Motorsport	1	0	0	0	0	N/A	DNF
1974	Formula One	March Engineering	12	0	0	0	0	5	16th
1974	European Formula Two	March Engineering	9	3	4	3	6	43	**2nd**
1974	Deutsche Rennsport Meisterschaft	BMW Motorsport	2	2	1	2	2	40	12th
1975	Formula One	Lavazza March	5	0	0	0	0	0	NC
1975	European Formula Two	March Engineering	4	0	0	1	1	0	NC‡
1975	World Sportscar Championship	BMW of America	2	0	0	0	0	0	NC
1975	World Sportscar Championship	BMW Motorsport	2	0	0	0	0	0	NC
1975	Deutsche Rennsport Meisterschaft	BMW Motorsport	1	0	1	0	0	0	NC
1976	Formula One	March EngineeringTheodore Racing	16	0	0	0	0	8	13th
1976	European Formula Two	March EngineeringTheodore Racing	4	2	2	1	2	0	NC‡
1977	Formula One	Lexington Racing	15	0	0	0	2	12	11th
1977	Formula One	Martini Racing	15	0	0	0	2	12	11th
1977	World Championship for Makes	BMW Faltz	3	0	0	0	0	0	NC
1977	World Championship for Makes	BMW Motorsport GmbH	3	0	0	0	0	0	NC
1977	Deutsche Rennsport Meisterschaft	BMW Faltz	3	3	0	1	3	60	8th
1977	European Formula Two	Project Four Racing	1	0	0	0	0	0	NC
1978	Formula One	Villiger Shadow	14	0	0	0	0	2	18th
1978	World Sportscar Championship	BMW Motorsport GmbH	4	0	0	0	1	0	NC
1978	World Sportscar Championship	BMW Alpina	4	0	0	0	1	0	NC
1978	Deutsche Rennsport Meisterschaft	McLaren North America	1	0	0	0	0	0	NC
1979	Formula One	ATS Wheels	12	0	0	0	0	2	20th
1979	BMW M1 Procar Championship	Manfred Cassani	9	2	5	0	3	73	**2nd**
1979	Deutsche Rennsport Meisterschaft	Manfred Cassani	2	0	0	0	0	9	28th
1979	European Formula Two	Polifac BMW Junior Team	1	0	0	0	0	0	NC
1980	Deutsche Rennsport Meisterschaft	Schnitzer Motorsport	13	4	2	2	8	145	**2nd**
1980	BMW M1 Procar Championship	Project Four Racing	9	2	1	1	4	71	**3rd**
1980	World Sportscar Championship	BMW Motorsport GmbH	3	0	0	0	1	0	NC
1980	World Sportscar Championship	BMW North America	3	0	0	0	1	0	NC
1980	24 Hours of Le Mans	BMW Motorsport GmbH	1	0	0	0	0	N/A	15th
1981	Deutsche Rennsport Meisterschaft	Schnitzer Motorsport	12	2	1	1	5	89	8th
1981	World Sportscar Championship	Bavarian Motors International	6	1	0	0	1	27.5	85th
1981	World Sportscar Championship	Team GS Sport	6	1	0	0	1	27.5	85th
1981	World Sportscar Championship	Gerhard Schneider	6	1	0	0	1	27.5	85th
1981	World Sportscar Championship	BMW Motorsport	6	1	0	0	1	27.5	85th
1981	24 Hours of Le Mans	BASF Cassetten Team GS Sport	1	0	0	0	0	N/A	DNF
1982	World Sportscar Championship	BASF Cassetten Team GS Sport	6	0	0	0	0	2	103rd
1982	Deutsche Rennsport Meisterschaft	Schnitzer Motorsport	2	0	0	0	0	0	NC
1982	24 Hours of Le Mans	BASF Cassetten Team GS Sport	1	0	0	0	0	N/A	DNF
1983	European Touring Car Championship	Schnitzer Motorsport	?	?	?	?	?	125	8th
1983	World Sportscar Championship	Brun Motorsport GmbH	4	0	0	0	0	10	32nd
1983	British Saloon Car Championship	Cheylesmore BMW Motorsport	3	0	1	0	2	12	6th
1983	24 Hours of Le Mans	Brun Motorsport GmbH	1	0	0	0	0	N/A	DNS
1984	World Sportscar Championship	Brun Motorsport GmbH	5	1	0	0	3	54	8th
1984	World Sportscar Championship	Trust Engineering	5	1	0	0	3	54	8th
1984	Deutsche Tourenwagen Meisterschaft	Jägermeister Brun Motorsport	5	0	0	0	1	37.5	16th
1984	European Touring Car Championship	Schnitzer Motorsport	?	?	?	?	?	147	6th
1984	All-Japan Sports Prototype Championship	Trust Engineering	?	0	0	0	0	12	15th
1984	IMSA GT Championship	Bob Akin Motor Racing	1	0	0	0	0	8	60th
1984	Interserie	Brun Motorsport	1	1	1	1	1	20	15th
1985	Interserie	Brun Motorsport	13	6	5	9	11	99	4th
1985	World Sportscar Championship	Rothmans Porsche	10	3	3	1	7	117	**1st**
1985	IMSA GT Championship	Bob Akin Motor Racing	4	0	2	0	0	12	34th
1985	24 Hours of Le Mans	Rothmans Porsche	1	0	1	0	1	N/A	**3rd**
1986	World Sportscar Championship	Rothmans Porsche	8	2	2	1	5	82	**2nd**
1986	World Sportscar Championship	Joest Racing	8	2	2	1	5	82	**2nd**
1986	IMSA GT Championship	Bob Akin Motor Racing	5	1	1	0	3	47	17th
1986	International Race of Champions		4	0	0	0	0	29	9th
1986	Supercup	Blaupunkt Joest Racing	?	?	?	?	?	62700	**1st**
1986	24 Hours of Le Mans	Rothmans Porsche	1	1	0	0	1	N/A	**1st**
1987	World Sportscar Championship	Rothmans Porsche	9	1	4	1	5	99	5th
1987	World Sportscar Championship	Porsche AG	9	1	4	1	5	99	5th
1987	World Sportscar Championship	Joest Racing	9	1	4	1	5	99	5th
1987	ADAC Supercup	Porsche AG	5	2	3	?	5	82	**1st**
1987	IMSA GT Championship	Bob Akin Motor Racing	1	0	0	0	0	11	35th
1987	24 Hours of Le Mans	Rothmans Porsche	1	1	0	0	1	N/A	**1st**
1988	ADAC Supercup	Porsche AG	5	1	?	?	3	32	**3rd**
1988	IMSA GT Championship	Bayside Disposal	3	1	0	0	1	48	16th
1988	24 Hours of Le Mans	Porsche AG	1	0	0	0	1	N/A	**2nd**
1989	IMSA GT Championship - GTO	Audi of America	13	7	4	5	9	170	**3rd**
1989	24 Hours of Le Mans	Joest Racing	1	0	0	0	1	N/A	**3rd**
1990	Deutsche Tourenwagen Meisterschaft	Schmidt Motorsport Technik	21	7	2	4	10	189	**1st**
1990	World Sportscar Championship	Joest Racing	3	0	0	0	0	2	31st
1990	IMSA GT Championship	Jochen Dauer Racing	2	0	0	0	0	27	22nd
1990	24 Hours of Le Mans	Joest Racing	1	0	0	0	0	N/A	4th
1991	Deutsche Tourenwagen Meisterschaft	Schmidt Motorsport Technik	20	4	1	4	8	158	**3rd**
1991	IMSA Bridgestone Supercar Championship		2	1	1	1	2	37	13th
1991	24 Hours of Le Mans	Konrad Motorsport	1	0	0	0	0	N/A	7th
1991	24 Hours of Le Mans	Joest Porsche Racing	1	0	0	0	0	N/A	7th
1992	Deutsche Tourenwagen Meisterschaft	Schmidt Motorsport Technik	12	0	0	0	1	21	18th
1992	IMSA Bridgestone Supercar Championship		5	2	3	0	4	91	7th
1992	IMSA GT Championship	Joest Racing	1	0	0	0	0	0	NC
1993	IMSA Bridgestone Supercar Championship		9	7	4	4	7	212	**1st**
1993	FIA Touring Car Challenge	ROC Competition	2	0	0	0	0	1	29th
1993	24 Hours of Le Mans	Le Mans Porsche Team	1	0	0	0	0	N/A	DNF
1994	Super Tourenwagen Cup	SMS Schmidt Motorsport	6	0	0	0	1	29	8th
1994	IMSA GT Championship – GTS		3	0	0	0	1	27	10th
1994	FIA Touring Car World Cup	ROC Competition	1	0	0	0	0	16	5th
1994	24 Hours of Le Mans	Le Mans Porsche Team	1	0	0	0	1	N/A	**3rd**
1994	24 Hours of Le Mans	Joest Racing	1	0	0	0	1	N/A	**3rd**
1995	Super Tourenwagen Cup	A.Z.K.-Team Schneider	16	0	0	0	4	354	4th
1995	FIA Touring Car World Cup	A.Z.K.-Team Schneider	2	0	0	0	0	16	9th
1995	IMSA GT Championship – GTS-1		?	?	?	?	?	66	8th
1995	24 Hours of Le Mans	Porsche Kremer Racing	1	0	0	0	0	N/A	6th
1996	International Touring Car Championship	Team Rosberg Opel	26	2	1	1	2	112	9th
1996	BPR Global GT Series	Porsche AG	2	2	0	1	2	0	NC
1996	24 Hours of Le Mans	Porsche AG	1	1	0	0	1	N/A	**2nd**
1996	IMSA GT Championship - GTS-1		?	?	?	?	?	49	10th
1997	FIA GT Championship	Porsche AG	7	0	0	0	0	10	17th
1997	24 Hours of Le Mans	Porsche AG	1	0	0	0	0	N/A	DNF
1998	International Sports Racing Series	BMW Team Rafanelli	3	0	0	0	1	15	22nd
1998	24 Hours of Le Mans	Team BMW Motorsport	1	0	0	0	0	N/A	DNF
1999	American Le Mans Series - GT	Prototype Technology Group	8	1	1	0	3	114	7th
2000	American Le Mans Series - GT	Prototype Technology Group	11	1	0	0	3	155	10th
2001	American Le Mans Series - GT	Prototype Technology Group	8	2	0	0	5	158	8th
2001	Rolex Sports Car Series - GT	JET Motorsports	1	0	0	0	0	12	68th
2002	24 Hours of Nürburgring - A6		1	0	0	0	0	N/A	?
2003	American Le Mans Series - GT	Prototype Technology Group	1	0	0	0	0	12	37th
2003	Speed World Challenge - GT	BMW Team PTG	10	0	0	1	3	194	4th
2003	24 Hours of Nürburgring - E1-XP	BMW Motorsport	1	0	?	?	0	N/A	?
2005	Grand Prix Masters	Team Phantom	1	0	0	0	0	0	NC
2005	24 Hours of Nürburgring - E1	Team Schnitzer	1	1	?	?	1	N/A	**1st**
2006	Grand Prix Masters	Team Phantom	2	0	0	0	0	3	5th
2007	24 Hours of Nürburgring - SP6	Motorsport Arena Oschersleben	1	1	1	?	1	N/A	**1st**
2008	24 Hours of Nürburgring - SP3T	Volkswagen Motorsport	1	1	0	0	1	N/A	**1st**
2009	VLN Series		8	?	?	?	?	44.21	108th
2009	24 Hours of Nürburgring - SP9	Phoenix Racing	1	0	0	0	0	N/A	7th
2010	VLN Series		?	?	?	?	?	25.61	264th
2011	Lamborghini Super Trofeo Europe - Pro	Bonaldi Motorsport	3	1	?	?	3	14	6th
2011	24 Hours of Nürburgring - SP9	Reiter Engineering	1	0	?	?	0	N/A	10th
2013	Volkswagen Scirocco R-Cup		1	0	0	0	0	0	NC†
2017	Audi TT Cup - Race of Legends		1	0	0	0	0	0	8th
2021	GT2 European Series - GT2 Am	True Racing by Reiter Engineering	10	0	2	2	9	156	**2nd**
2022	DTM Classic Cup - Class 3		2	0	0	0	1	11.5	6th

^{‡} Graded drivers not eligible for European Formula Two Championship points.
^{†} As Stuck was a guest driver, he was ineligible for championship points.

=== Complete 24 Hours of Nürburgring results ===
Year	Team	Co-Drivers	Car	Class	Laps	Pos.	Class Pos.	Notes
1970	(Germany) Koepchen BMW Tuning	(Germany) Clemens Schickentanz	BMW 2002 TI	T2.0	123	1st	1st	
1971	(Germany) BMW Alpina	(Germany) Günter Huber	BMW 2002 TI	T2.0		DNF	DNF	Engine
1972	(Germany) Fritzinger Tuning	(Germany) Klaus Fritzinger	Ford Capri RS 2600	T+2.0	144	2nd	2nd	
1981	(Germany) Yale Stapler Team	(Germany) Kurt Hens (Germany) Michael Middelhaufe	BMW 530i	Gr.1+2.5	124	11th	5th	
1982	(Germany) Auto Budde Team	(Germany) Michael Middelhaufe (Germany) Heiner Müller	BMW 528i	11	37	DNF	DNF	Accident
1984	(Germany) Brun Motorsport	(Germany) Harald Grohs (Austria) Dieter Quester	BMW 635 CSi	7	68	DNF	DNF	Accident
1992	(Germany) Manthey Racing	(Germany) Frank Biela (Germany) Olaf Manthey (Germany) Walter Röhrl	Porsche 911 Carrera	12	74	3rd	3rd	
1992	(Germany) Manthey Racing	(Germany) Uwe Alzen (Germany) Frank Biela (Germany) Frank Jelinski	Porsche 911 Carrera	12	65	43rd	10th	
1998	(Germany) BMW Motorsport	(Germany) Andreas Bovensiepen (Belgium) Marc Duez (Germany) Christian Menzel	BMW 320d	2	137	1st	1st	
2000	(Germany) Scuderia Augustusburg Brühl	(Germany) Johannes Scheid (Germany) Stefan Schlesack	BMW M3 GTRS	A6	95	DNF	DNF	
2002	(Germany) Scuderia Augustusburg Brühl	(Germany) Oliver Kainz (Germany) Mario Merten (Germany) Johannes Scheid	BMW M3 GTRS	A6	108	DNF	DNF	Gearbox
2003	(Germany) BMW Motorsport	(Belgium) Marc Duez (Denmark) John Nielsen (United States) Boris Said	BMW M3 GTR	E1	69	DNF	DNF	Accident
2004	(Germany) BMW Motorsport	(Portugal) Pedro Lamy (Germany) Dirk Müller (Germany) Jörg Müller	BMW M3 GTR	E1	143	1st	1st	
2004	(Germany) BMW Motorsport	(Netherlands) Duncan Huisman (Portugal) Pedro Lamy (United States) Boris Said	BMW M3 GTR	E1	142	2nd	2nd	
2005	(Germany) BMW Motorsport	(Portugal) Pedro Lamy (Germany) Dirk Müller (Germany) Jörg Müller	BMW M3 GTR	E1	134	2nd	2nd	
2006	(Austria) Duller Motorsport	(Germany) Artur Deutgen (Austria) Dieter Quester (Germany) Dirk Werner	BMW M3 GTR	SP6	53	DNF	DNF	Accident
2007	(Austria) Schubert Motorsport	(Sweden) Richard Göransson (Germany) Claudia Hürtgen (Austria) Johannes Stuck	BMW Z4 M Coupe	SP6	106	5th	1st	
2008	(Germany) Volkswagen Motorsport	(Germany) Florian Gruber (Sweden) Jimmy Johansson (Germany) Thomas Mutsch	VW Scirocco	SP3T	138	11th	1st	
2008	(Germany) Volkswagen Motorsport	(South Africa) Giniel De Villiers (Germany) Dieter Depping (Spain) Carlos Sainz	VW Scirocco	SP3T	136	15th	2nd	
2009	(Germany) Phoenix Racing	(Germany) Frank Biela (Switzerland) Marcel Fässler (Italy) Emanuele Pirro	Audi R8 LMS	SP9 GT3	144	12th	7th	
2010	(Germany) Phoenix Racing	(Germany) Marc Basseng (Germany) Mike Rockenfeller (Germany) Frank Stippler	Audi R8 LMS	SP9 GT3	41	DNF	DNF	
2011	(Germany) Team Stuck^{3}	(Germany) Dennis Rostek (Austria) Ferdinand Stuck (Austria) Johannes Stuck	Lamborghini Gallardo LP600+	SP9 GT3	148	15th	10th	

=== Complete European Formula Two Championship results ===
(key) (Races in bold indicate pole position; races in italics indicate fastest lap)

Year	Entrant	Chassis	Engine	1	2	3	4	5	6	7	8	9	10	11	12	13	14	15	16	17	Pos.	Pts
1971	Eifelland Wohnwagenbau	Brabham BT30	Cosworth	HOC	THR	NÜR; Ret	JAR	PAL	ROU	MAN	TUL	ALB	VLL	VLL							NC	0
1973	March Racing Team	March 732	BMW	MAL	HOC; DSQ	THR															NC	0
1973	STP March Engineering	March 732	BMW				**NÜR**; 16	PAU	KIN	NIV	HOC; Ret	ROU; Ret	MNZ	MAN	KAR	PER	SAL	NOR; Ret	ALB	VLL	NC	0
1974	March Racing Team	March 742	BMW	**BAR**; 1	**HOC**; 1	PAU; Ret	SAL; Ret	**HOC**; 3	MUG	KAR; 8	**PER**; 1	HOC; 2	VLL; 2								**2nd**	**43**
1975	March Engineering	March 752	BMW	EST	THR; Ret	HOC; 2	NÜR; 8	PAU	HOC; Ret	SAL	ROU	MUG	PER	SIL	ZOL	NOG	VLL				NC	0^{‡}
1976	March Engineering	March 762	BMW	**HOC**; 1	THR	VLL	SAL; Ret	PAU	**HOC**; 1	ROU	MUG	PER	EST	NOG	HOC; Ret						NC	0^{‡}
1977	Project Four Racing	Ralt RT1	BMW	SIL	THR	HOC; Ret	NÜR	VLL	PAU	MUG	ROU	NOG	PER	MIS	EST	DON					NC	0
1979	Polifac BMW Junior Team	March 792	BMW	SIL	HOC	THR	NÜR	VLL	MUG	PAU	HOC; Ret	ZAN	PER	MIS	DON						NC	0

^{‡} Graded drivers not eligible for European Formula Two Championship points

=== Complete World Sportscar Championship results ===
(key) (Races in bold indicate pole position) (Races in italics indicate fastest lap)

Year	Entrant	Class	Chassis	Engine	1	2	3	4	5	6	7	8	9	10	11	12	13	14	15	Pos.	Pts
1970	Oldenkott Pipe and Tobacco Racing	GT +2.0	Porsche 911 S	Porsche F6	DAY	SEB	BRH	MZA	TGA	SPA	NÜR; 16	LMS	GLN	ÖST						(Note: No drivers' Championship.)	
1972	Ford Motorenwerke	T 3.0	Ford Capri	Ford 4.0 V6	BUE	DAY	SEB	BRH	MZA	SPA	TGA	NÜR; 8	LMS; Ret	ÖST	GLN						
1973	B.M.W. Alpina	T	BMW 3.0 CSL	BMW 3.2 L6	DAY	VAL	DIJ	MZA	SPA; 7	TGA											
1973	BMW Motorsport GmbH	T	BMW 3.0 CSL	BMW 3.0 L6							NÜR; Ret	LMS; Ret	ÖST	GLN							
1975	BMW of America	T	BMW 3.0 CSL	BMW 3.5 L6	DAY; 33	MUG	DIJ	MZA	SPA	PER	NÜR	ÖST									
1975	BMW Motorsport	T	BMW 3.0 CSL	BMW 3.5 L6									GLN; 20								
1977	BMW Faltz	Gr.5	BMW 320i	BMW M12 2.0 L4	DAY	MUG	SIL	NÜR; Ret	GLN; 28	MOS										(Note: In 1976 and 1977 the World Championship was divided into two series that ran simultaneously but separately: The World Sportscar Championship and the World Championship for Makes.)	
1977	BMW Motorsport GmbH	Gr.5	BMW 320i	BMW 2.0 L4 t							BRH; Ret	HOC	VLL							(Note: In 1976 and 1977 the World Championship was divided into two series that ran simultaneously but separately: The World Sportscar Championship and the World Championship for Makes.)	
1978	BMW Motorsport GmbH	Gr.5	BMW 320i	BMW 2.0 L4 t	DAY	MUG	DIJ	SIL; Ret				VLL; Ret									
1978	B.M.W. Alpina	Gr.5	BMW 320i	BMW M12 2.0 L4					NÜR; 6	MIS	GLN; 3										
1980	BMW Motorsport GmbH	Gr.5	BMW M1	BMW M88 3.5 L6	DAY	BRH	MUG	MZA	SIL	NÜR; 3	LMS; 15										
1980	BMW North America	Gr.5	BMW M1	BMW M88 3.5 L6								GLN; 36	MOS	VAL	DIJ						
1981	Bavarian Motors International	Gr.5	BMW M1	BMW M88 3.5 L6	DAY; 6	SEB	MUG	MZA	RSD											85th	27.5
1981	Team GS Sport	Gr.5	BMW M1	BMW M88 3.5 L6						SIL; Ret		LMS; Ret	PER	DAY	GLN	SPA			BRH; Ret	85th	27.5
1981	Gerhard Schneider	Gr.5	BMW M1	BMW M88 3.5 L6							NÜR; 1									85th	27.5
1981	BMW Motorsport	Gr.5	BMW M1	BMW M88 3.5 L6													MOS; 14	ROA		85th	27.5
1982	BASF Cassetten Team GS Sport	C	Sauber SHS C6	Cosworth DFL 4.0 V8	MZA; Ret	SIL; Ret	NÜR; Ret	LMS; Ret	SPA; 9	MUG	FUJ									103rd	2
1982	BASF Cassetten Team GS Sport	C	Sauber SHS C6	BMW 1.7 L4 t								BRH; Ret								103rd	2
1983	Brun Motorsport GmbH	C	Sehcar C6	Cosworth DFL 4.0 V8	MZA	SIL; Ret														32nd	10
1983	Brun Motorsport GmbH	C	Sehcar C6	BMW M88/2 3.2 L6 t			NÜR; Ret													32nd	10
1983	Brun Motorsport GmbH	C	Sehcar C830	Porsche Type 935/76 2.6 F6 t				LMS; DNS												32nd	10
1983	Brun Motorsport GmbH	C	Porsche 956	Porsche Type 935/76 2.6 F6 t					SPA; 4	FUJ	KYA; Ret									32nd	10
1984	Brun Motorsport GmbH	C1	Porsche 956	Porsche Type 935 2.6 F6 t	MZA; 4	SIL	LMS													8th	54
1984	Brun Motorsport GmbH	C1	Porsche 956B	Porsche Type 935 2.6 F6 t				NÜR; Ret	BRH	MOS	SPA; 3	IMO; 1								8th	54
1984	Trust Engineering	C1	Porsche 956B	Porsche Type 935 2.6 F6 t									FUJ; 3	KYA	SAN					8th	54
1985	Rothmans Porsche	C1	Porsche 962C	Porsche Type 935 2.6 F6 t	MUG; DSQ			**LMS**; 3	HOC; 1	**MOS**; 1	SPA; 2	BRH; 1	**FUJ**; Ret							1st	117
1985	Rothmans Porsche	C1	Porsche 956	Porsche Type 935 2.6 F6 t		MZA; 2	SIL; 2							SHA; Ret						1st	117
1986	Rothmans Porsche	C1	Porsche 962C	Porsche Type 935 2.6 F6 t	MZA; 1	SIL; 2	LMS; 1	NOR; 15			NÜR; Ret	SPA; 3	FUJ; 25							2nd	82
1986	Joest Racing	C1	Porsche 956B	Porsche Type 935 2.6 F6 t					**BRH**; 2	JER										2nd	82
1987	Rothmans Porsche	C1	Porsche 962C	Porsche Type 935 3.0 F6 t	JAR; 2	**JER**; 3	**MZA**; 2		LMS; 1											5th	99
1987	Porsche AG	C1	Porsche 962C	Porsche Type 935 3.0 F6 t				**SIL**; 3		**NOR**; Ret										5th	99
1987	Joest Racing	C1	Porsche 962C	Porsche Type 935 3.0 F6 t							BRH; 4	NÜR; 2	SPA; 5	FUJ						5th	99
1988	Porsche AG	C1	Porsche 962C	Porsche Type 935 3.0 F6 t	JER	JAR	MZA	SIL	**LMS**; 2	BRN	BRH	NÜR	SPA	FUJ	SAN					22nd	45
1990	Joest Racing	C1	Porsche 962C	Porsche Type 935 3.2 F6 t	SUZ	MZA	SIL	SPA	DIJ	NÜR; Ret	DON	CGV; 8	MEX; 5							31st	2
1991	Joest Racing	C1	Porsche 962C	Porsche Type 935 3.2 F6 t	SUZ	MZA	SIL	LMS; 7	NÜR	MAG	MXC	AUT								43rd	4

Footnotes

=== Complete 24 Hours of Le Mans results ===
Year	Team	Co-Drivers	Car	Class	Laps	Pos.	Class Pos.
1972	(Germany) Ford Motor Company Deutschland	(Germany) Jochen Mass	Ford Capri 2600RS	T 3.0	152	DNF	DNF
1973	(Germany) BMW Motorsport	(New Zealand) Chris Amon	BMW 3.0 CSL	T 5.0	160	DNF	DNF
1980	(Germany) BMW Motorsport GmbH	(Germany) Hans-Georg Bürger (France) Dominique Lacaud	BMW M1	IMSA	283	15th	5th
1981	(Germany) BASF Cassetten Team GS Sport	(France) Jean-Pierre Jarier (Germany) Helmut Henzler	BMW M1	IMSA; GTX	57	DNF	DNF
1982	(Germany) BASF Cassetten Team GS Sport	(France) Jean-Louis Schlesser (Austria) Dieter Quester	Sauber SHS C6-Ford	C	76	DNF	DNF
1983	(Switzerland) Brun Motorsport GmbH	(Switzerland) Walter Brun (West Germany) Harald Grohs	Sehcar C830-Porsche	C	-	DNS	DNS
1985	(Germany) Rothmans Porsche	(United Kingdom) Derek Bell	Porsche 962C	C1	367	**3rd**	**3rd**
1986	(Germany) Rothmans Porsche	(United Kingdom) Derek Bell (United States) Al Holbert	Porsche 962C	C1	368	**1st**	**1st**
1987	(Germany) Rothmans Porsche AG	(United Kingdom) Derek Bell (United States) Al Holbert	Porsche 962C	C1	355	**1st**	**1st**
1988	(Germany) Porsche AG	(Germany) Klaus Ludwig (United Kingdom) Derek Bell	Porsche 962C	C1	394	**2nd**	**2nd**
1989	(Germany) Joest Racing	(France) Bob Wollek	Porsche 962C	C1	382	**3rd**	**3rd**
1990	(Germany) Joest Porsche Racing	(United Kingdom) Derek Bell (Germany) Frank Jelinski	Porsche 962C	C1	350	4th	4th
1991	(Austria) Konrad Motorsport (Germany) Joest Porsche Racing	(United Kingdom) Derek Bell (Germany) Frank Jelinski	Porsche 962C	C2	347	7th	7th
1993	(Germany) Le Mans Porsche Team	(Germany) Walter Röhrl (United States) Hurley Haywood	Porsche 911 Turbo S LM-GT	GT	79	DNF	DNF
1994	(Germany) Le Mans Porsche Team (Germany) Joest Racing	(Belgium) Thierry Boutsen (United States) Danny Sullivan	Dauer 962 Le Mans	GT1	343	**3rd**	**2nd**
1995	(Germany) Porsche Kremer Racing	(Belgium) Thierry Boutsen (France) Christophe Bouchut	Kremer K8 Spyder	WSC	289	6th	**2nd**
1996	(Germany) Porsche AG	(Belgium) Thierry Boutsen (France) Bob Wollek	Porsche 911 GT1	GT1	353	**2nd**	**1st**
1997	(Germany) Porsche AG	(Belgium) Thierry Boutsen (France) Bob Wollek	Porsche 911 GT1	GT1	238	DNF	DNF
1998	(Germany) Team BMW Motorsport	(United Kingdom) Steve Soper (Denmark) Tom Kristensen	BMW V12 LM	LMP1	60	DNF	DNF

=== Complete 24 Hours of Spa results ===
Year	Team	Co-Drivers	Car	Class	Laps	Pos.	Class Pos.
1971	(Germany) BMW Alpina	(Austria) Gerold Pankl	BMW 2002 TI	Div. 2		DNF	DNF
1972	(Germany) Ford Köln	(Germany) Jochen Mass	Ford Capri RS 2600	Div. 3	318	1st	1st
1973	(Germany) BMW Motorsport	(New Zealand) Chris Amon	BMW 3.0 CSL	Div. 2		DNF	DNF
1979	(Belgium) Kinley Luigi Racing	(Belgium) Patrick Nève (Belgium) Didier Theys	BMW 530i	T +2.5		DNF	DNF
1983	(Germany) Team Schnitzer Eterna	(Germany) Harald Grohs (Switzerland) Walter Brun	BMW 635 CSi	Div. 3		DNF	DNF
1984	(Italy) Schnitzer BMW Italia	(Austria) Dieter Quester (United Kingdom) James Weaver	BMW 635 CSi	Div. 3	449	3rd	3rd
2004	(Germany) BMW Motorsport	(Germany) Dirk Müller (Germany) Jörg Müller	BMW M3 GTR	G2	525	6th	1st

=== Complete Formula One World Championship results ===
(key) (Races in bold indicate pole position; races in italics indicate fastest lap)

Year	Entrant	Chassis	Engine	1	2	3	4	5	6	7	8	9	10	11	12	13	14	15	16	17	WDC	Pts
1974	March Engineering	March 741	Ford Cosworth DFV 3.0 V8	ARG; Ret	BRA; Ret	RSA; 5	ESP; 4	BEL; Ret	MON; Ret	SWE	NED; Ret	FRA; DNQ	GBR; Ret	GER; 7	AUT; 11	ITA; Ret	CAN; Ret	USA; DNQ			16th	5
1975	Lavazza March	March 751	Ford Cosworth DFV 3.0 V8	ARG	BRA	RSA	ESP	MON	BEL	SWE	NED	FRA	GBR; Ret	GER; Ret	AUT; Ret	ITA; Ret	USA; 8				NC	0
1976	March Racing	March 761	Ford Cosworth DFV 3.0 V8	BRA; 4	RSA; 12		ESP; Ret	BEL; Ret	MON; 4	SWE; Ret	FRA; 7	GBR; Ret	GER; Ret	AUT; Ret	NED; Ret	ITA; Ret	CAN; Ret	USA; 5	JPN; Ret		13th	8
1976	Theodore Racing	March 761	Ford Cosworth DFV 3.0 V8			USW; Ret															13th	8
1977	Lexington Racing	March 761B	Ford Cosworth DFV 3.0 V8	ARG	BRA	RSA; Ret															11th	12
1977	Martini Racing	Brabham BT45B	Alfa Romeo 115-12 3.0 F12				USW; Ret	ESP; 6	MON; Ret	BEL; 6	SWE; 10	FRA; Ret	GBR; 5	GER; 3	AUT; 3	NED; 7	ITA; Ret	USA; Ret	CAN; Ret	JPN; 7	11th	12
1978	Villiger Shadow	Shadow DN8	Ford Cosworth DFV 3.0 V8	ARG; 17	BRA; Ret	RSA; DNQ															18th	2
1978	Villiger Shadow	Shadow DN9	Ford Cosworth DFV 3.0 V8				USW; DNS	MON; Ret	BEL; Ret	ESP; Ret	SWE; 11	FRA; 11	GBR; 5	GER; Ret	AUT; Ret	NED; Ret	ITA; Ret	USA; Ret	CAN; Ret		18th	2
1979	ATS Wheels	ATS D2	Ford Cosworth DFV 3.0 V8	ARG; DNQ	BRA; Ret	RSA; Ret	USW; DSQ	ESP; 14	BEL; 8	MON; Ret	FRA; DNS	GBR; DNQ	GER; Ret								20th	2
1979	ATS Wheels	ATS D3	Ford Cosworth DFV 3.0 V8											AUT; Ret	NED; Ret	ITA; 11	CAN; Ret	USA; 5			20th	2

=== Complete British Saloon Car Championship results ===
(key) (Races in bold indicate pole position – 1983 in class) (Races in italics indicate fastest lap – 1 point awarded 1983 all races, 1983 in class)

Year	Team	Car	Class	1	2	3	4	5	6	7	8	9	10	11	DC	Pts	Class
1973	BMW Motorsport	BMW 3.0 CSL	D	BRH	SIL	THR	THR	SIL	ING	BRH	**SIL**; Ret	BRH			NC	0	NC
1983	Cheylesmore BMW Motorsport	BMW 635CSi	A	SIL	OUL	THR	BRH	THR	SIL	DON	SIL ovr:5 cls:5	**DON** ovr:2 cls:2	BRH ovr:3 cls:3	SIL	15th	12	6th

=== Complete Deutsche Tourenwagen Meisterschaft results ===
(key) (Races in bold indicate pole position) (Races in italics indicate fastest lap)

Year	Team	Car	1	2	3	4	5	6	7	8	9	10	11	12	13	14	15	16	17	18	19	20	21	22	23	24	Pos.	Pts
1984	Jägermeister Brun Motorsport	BMW 635 CSi	ZOL; 15	HOC	AVU	AVU	MFA; 10	WUN; 3	NÜR	NÜR	NOR	NÜR	DIE	HOC; 5	HOC; 24	ZOL	NÜR										16th	37.5
1990	Schmidt Motorsport Technik	Audi V8 Quattro	ZOL; 1; 14	ZOL; 2; 3	HOC; 1; 6	HOC; 2; 2	NÜR; 1 Ret	NÜR; 2; 16	**AVU**; **1**; 1	**AVU**; **2**; 1	MFA; 1; 15	MFA; 2; 20	**WUN**; **1**; 1	**WUN**; **2**; 1	NÜR; 1 Ret	NÜR; 2; 11	NOR; 1; 1	NOR; 2; 3	DIE; 1; 14	DIE; 2; 8	NÜR; 1; 11	NÜR; 2; 10	HOC; 1; 1	**HOC**; **2**; 1			1st	189
1991	Schmidt Motorsport Technik	Audi V8 Quattro Evo	ZOL; 1; 9	ZOL; 2; 2	HOC; 1; 11	HOC; 2; 26	NÜR; 1; 10	NÜR; 2 Ret	**AVU**; **1**; 1	**AVU**; **2**; 2	WUN; 1; 16	WUN; 2; 11	NOR; 1; 6	NOR; 2; 1	DIE; 1; 1	DIE; 2; 4	NÜR; 1; 9	NÜR; 2; 16	ALE; 1; 3	ALE; 2; 1	HOC; 1; 14	HOC; 2; 2	BRN; 1 Ret	BRN; 2 Ret	DON; 1 Ret	DON; 2; 8	3rd	158
1992	Schmidt Motorsport Technik	Audi V8 Quattro Evo	ZOL; 1 Ret	ZOL; 2 Ret	NÜR; 1; 2	NÜR; 2; 12	WUN; 1; 11	WUN; 2 Ret	AVU; 1; 6	AVU; 2 Ret	HOC; 1; 19	HOC; 2 Ret	NÜR; 1; 23	NÜR; 2 Ret	NOR; 1	NOR; 2	BRN; 1	BRN; 2	DIE; 1	DIE; 2	ALE; 1	ALE; 2	NÜR; 1	NÜR; 2	HOC; 1	HOC; 2	18th	21

=== Complete Super Tourenwagen Cup results ===
(key) (Races in bold indicate pole position) (Races in italics indicate fastest lap)

Year	Team	Car	1	2	3	4	5	6	7	8	9	10	11	12	13	14	15	16	Pos.	Pts
1994	SMS Schmidt Motorsport	Audi 80 Quattro Competition	AVU; 6	WUN; 2	ZOL; 5	ZAN; Ret	ÖST	SAL	SPA; 12	NÜR; Ret									8th	29
1995	A.Z.K.-Team Schneider	Audi A4 Quattro	ZOL; 1; 2	ZOL; 2; 6	SPA; 1; 4	SPA; 2; 2	ÖST; 1; 6	ÖST; 2 Ret	HOC; 1; 3	HOC; 2; 2	NÜR; 1; 4	NÜR; 2; 4	SAL; 1; 9	SAL; 2; 9	AVU; 1; 15	AVU; 2; 5	NÜR; 1; 5	NÜR; 2; 6	4th	354

=== Complete International Touring Car Championship results ===
(key) (Races in bold indicate pole position) (Races in italics indicate fastest lap)

Year	Team	Car	1	2	3	4	5	6	7	8	9	10	11	12	13	14	15	16	17	18	19	20	21	22	23	24	25	26	Pos.	Pts
1996	Team Rosberg Opel	Opel Calibra V6 4x4	HOC; 1; 5	HOC; 2; 7	NÜR; 1; 6	NÜR; 2; 14†	EST; 1 Ret	EST; 2; 7	**HEL**; **1**; 1	**HEL**; **2**; 1	NOR; 1; 7	NOR; 2; 4	DIE; 1; 5	DIE; 2; 4	SIL; 1; 12	SIL; 2; 15	NÜR; 1; 22†	NÜR; 2; 12	MAG; 1; 7	MAG; 2 Ret	MUG; 1; 5	MUG; 2; 16†	HOC; 1; 17†	HOC; 2; 9	INT; 1; 7	INT; 2 Ret	SUZ; 1; 18	SUZ; 2; 18†	9th	112

- † — Retired, but was classified as he completed 90% of the winner's race distance.

=== Complete Grand Prix Masters results ===
(key) Races in bold indicate pole position, races in italics indicate fastest lap.

Year	Team	Chassis	Engine	1	2	3	4	5
2005	Team Phantom	Delta Motorsport GPM	Nicholson McLaren 3.5 V8	RSA; 6				
2006	Team Phantom	Delta Motorsport GPM	Nicholson McLaren 3.5 V8	QAT; Ret	ITA; C	GBR; 4	MAL; C	RSA; C

== Notes ==
Sporting positions
Preceded by Inaugural	Deutsche Rennsport Meisterschaft; Champion; 1972	Succeeded by Dieter Glemser
Preceded by Herbert Adamzyck	Guia Race; Winner; 1980	Succeeded by Manfred Winkelhock
Preceded by Helmut Greiner	Guia Race; Winner; 1983	Succeeded by Tom Walkinshaw
Preceded by Stefan Bellof	World Sportscar Championship; Champion; 1985; With: Derek Bell	Succeeded by Derek Bell
Preceded by Klaus Ludwig; Paolo Barilla; Louis Krages	Winner of the 24 Hours of Le Mans; 1986-1987; With: Derek Bell & Al Holbert	Succeeded by Jan Lammers; Johnny Dumfries; Andy Wallace
Preceded by Roberto Ravaglia	Deutsche Tourenwagen Meisterschaft; Champion; 1990	Succeeded by Frank Biela
