= 1986 360 km of Jerez =

Layout of the Circuito de Jerez (1985-1992)

The 1986 Trofeo Silk Cut was the sixth round of the 1986 World Sports-Prototype Championship, although it did not count towards the Teams' Championship. It took place at Circuito Permanente de Jerez, Spain on August 3, 1986, marking the first running of the 360 km of Jerez and the first time that the World Championship featured an event in Spain.

== Official results ==
Class winners in bold. Cars failing to complete 75% of the winner's distance marked as Not Classified (NC).

Pos	Class	No	Team	Drivers	Chassis	Tyre	Laps
Pos	Class	No	Team	Drivers	Engine	Tyre	Laps
1	**C1**	**18**	**(Switzerland) Brun Motorsport**	**(Argentina) Oscar Larrauri (Spain) Jesús Pareja**	**Porsche 962C**	**MI**	**86**
1	**C1**	**18**	**(Switzerland) Brun Motorsport**	**(Argentina) Oscar Larrauri (Spain) Jesús Pareja**	**Porsche Type-935 2.6L Turbo Flat-6**	**MI**	**86**
2	C1	17	(Switzerland) Brun Motorsport	(Germany) Frank Jelinski (Switzerland) Walter Brun	Porsche 956	**MI**	86
2	C1	17	(Switzerland) Brun Motorsport	(Germany) Frank Jelinski (Switzerland) Walter Brun	Porsche Type-935 2.6L Turbo Flat-6	**MI**	86
3	C1	52	(United Kingdom) Silk Cut Jaguar	(Netherlands) Jan Lammers (United Kingdom) Derek Warwick	Jaguar XJR-6	**D**	84
3	C1	52	(United Kingdom) Silk Cut Jaguar	(Netherlands) Jan Lammers (United Kingdom) Derek Warwick	Jaguar 6.5L V12	**D**	84
4	C1	9	(Germany) Obermaier Racing Team	(Germany) Jürgen Lässig (Italy) Fulvio Ballabio (United Kingdom) Dudley Wood	Porsche 956	**G**	82
4	C1	9	(Germany) Obermaier Racing Team	(Germany) Jürgen Lässig (Italy) Fulvio Ballabio (United Kingdom) Dudley Wood	Porsche Type-935 2.6L Turbo Flat-6	**G**	82
5	**C2**	**70**	**(United Kingdom) Spice Engineering**	**(United Kingdom) Gordon Spice (United Kingdom) Ray Bellm**	**Spice SE86C**	**A**	**79**
5	**C2**	**70**	**(United Kingdom) Spice Engineering**	**(United Kingdom) Gordon Spice (United Kingdom) Ray Bellm**	**Ford Cosworth DFL 3.3L V8**	**A**	**79**
6	C2	75	(United Kingdom) ADA Engineering	(United Kingdom) Evan Clements (United Kingdom) Ian Harrower	Gebhardt JC843	**A**	78
6	C2	75	(United Kingdom) ADA Engineering	(United Kingdom) Evan Clements (United Kingdom) Ian Harrower	Ford Cosworth DFL 3.3L V8	**A**	78
7	C2	105	(Italy) Kelmar Racing	(Italy) Pasquale Barberio (Italy) Maurizio Gellini	Tiga GC85	**A**	77
7	C2	105	(Italy) Kelmar Racing	(Italy) Pasquale Barberio (Italy) Maurizio Gellini	Ford Cosworth DFL 3.3L V8	**A**	77
8	C1	33	(Spain) Danone Porsche España (United Kingdom) John Fitzpatrick Racing	(Spain) Emilio de Villota (Spain) Fermín Vélez	Porsche 956B	**G**	76
8	C1	33	(Spain) Danone Porsche España (United Kingdom) John Fitzpatrick Racing	(Spain) Emilio de Villota (Spain) Fermín Vélez	Porsche Type-935 2.6L Turbo Flat-6	**G**	76
9	C1	66	(United Kingdom) Cosmic Racing	(Greece) Costas Los (United Kingdom) Tiff Needell	March 84G	**A**	69
9	C1	66	(United Kingdom) Cosmic Racing	(Greece) Costas Los (United Kingdom) Tiff Needell	Porsche Type-935 2.6L Turbo Flat-6	**A**	69
10	C2	97	(United Kingdom) Roy Baker Racing Tiga	(Morocco) Max Cohen-Olivar (Denmark) David Palmer	Tiga GC285	**A**	64
10	C2	97	(United Kingdom) Roy Baker Racing Tiga	(Morocco) Max Cohen-Olivar (Denmark) David Palmer	Ford Cosworth BDT 1.7L Turbo I4	**A**	64
11 NC	C2	72	(United Kingdom) John Bartlett Racing	(United Kingdom) Robin Donovan (United Kingdom) Nick Adams	Bardon DB1	?	57
11 NC	C2	72	(United Kingdom) John Bartlett Racing	(United Kingdom) Robin Donovan (United Kingdom) Nick Adams	Ford Cosworth DFL 3.3L V8	?	57
12 DNF	C2	89	(Norway) Martin Schanche Racing	(Norway) Martin Schanche (Norway) Torgye Kleppe	Argo JM19	**G**	75
12 DNF	C2	89	(Norway) Martin Schanche Racing	(Norway) Martin Schanche (Norway) Torgye Kleppe	Zakspeed 1.9L Turbo I4	**G**	75
13 DNF	C2	98	(United Kingdom) Roy Baker Racing Tiga	(France) "Pierre Chauvet" (United Kingdom) David Andrews	Tiga GC286	**A**	73
13 DNF	C2	98	(United Kingdom) Roy Baker Racing Tiga	(France) "Pierre Chauvet" (United Kingdom) David Andrews	Ford Cosworth BDT 1.7L Turbo I4	**A**	73
14 DNF	C1	51	(United Kingdom) Silk Cut Jaguar	(United Kingdom) Martin Brundle (United States) Eddie Cheever	Jaguar XJR-6	**D**	40
14 DNF	C1	51	(United Kingdom) Silk Cut Jaguar	(United Kingdom) Martin Brundle (United States) Eddie Cheever	Jaguar 6.5L V12	**D**	40
15 DNF	C1	53	(United Kingdom) Silk Cut Jaguar	(Italy) Gianfranco Brancatelli (France) Jean-Louis Schlesser	Jaguar XJR-6	**D**	12
15 DNF	C1	53	(United Kingdom) Silk Cut Jaguar	(Italy) Gianfranco Brancatelli (France) Jean-Louis Schlesser	Jaguar 6.5L V12	**D**	12
16 DNF	C2	99	(United Kingdom) Roy Baker Racing Tiga	(United Kingdom) John Sheldon (Denmark) Thorkild Thyrring	Tiga GC286	**A**	12
16 DNF	C2	99	(United Kingdom) Roy Baker Racing Tiga	(United Kingdom) John Sheldon (Denmark) Thorkild Thyrring	Ford Cosworth BDT 1.7L Turbo I4	**A**	12
17 DNF	C1	55	(Spain) Danone Porsche España (United Kingdom) John Fitzpatrick Racing	(Spain) Adrián Campos (Spain) Paco Romero	Porsche 962C	**G**	7
17 DNF	C1	55	(Spain) Danone Porsche España (United Kingdom) John Fitzpatrick Racing	(Spain) Adrián Campos (Spain) Paco Romero	Porsche Type-935 2.6L Turbo Flat-6	**G**	7

== Statistics ==
- Pole Position - #17 Brun Motorsport - 1:33.480
- Fastest Lap - #18 Brun Motorsport - 1:38.090
- Average Speed - 147.270 km/h

World Sportscar Championship
Previous race: 1986 1000 km of Brands Hatch	1986 season	Next race: 1986 1000 km of Nürburgring
