= 1986 360 km of Monza =

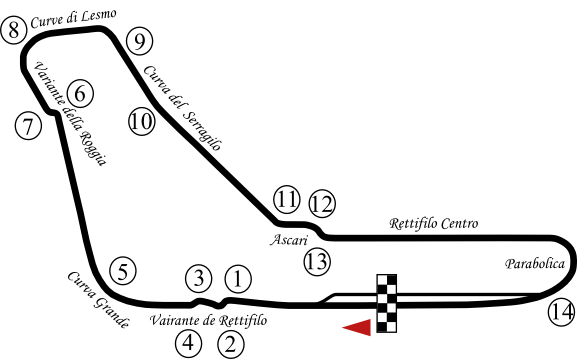
Layout of the Autodromo Nazionale di Monza (1976-1993)

The 1986 Coppa Kouros was the opening round of the 1986 World Sports-Prototype Championship. It took place at the Autodromo Nazionale Monza, Italy on April 20, 1986.

== Official results ==
Class winners in bold. Cars failing to complete 75% of the winner's distance marked as Not Classified (NC).

Pos	Class	No	Team	Drivers	Chassis	Tyre	Laps
Pos	Class	No	Team	Drivers	Engine	Tyre	Laps
1	**C1**	**1**	**(Germany) Rothmans Porsche**	**(Germany) Hans-Joachim Stuck (United Kingdom) Derek Bell**	**Porsche 962C**	**D**	**63**
1	**C1**	**1**	**(Germany) Rothmans Porsche**	**(Germany) Hans-Joachim Stuck (United Kingdom) Derek Bell**	**Porsche Type-935 2.6L Turbo Flat-6**	**D**	**63**
2	C1	4	(Italy) Martini Racing	(Italy) Andrea de Cesaris (Italy) Alessandro Nannini	Lancia LC2	**MI**	63
2	C1	4	(Italy) Martini Racing	(Italy) Andrea de Cesaris (Italy) Alessandro Nannini	Ferrari 308C 3.0L Turbo V8	**MI**	63
3	C1	19	(Switzerland) Brun Motorsport	(Switzerland) Walter Brun (Italy) Massimo Sigala	Porsche 956	**MI**	61
3	C1	19	(Switzerland) Brun Motorsport	(Switzerland) Walter Brun (Italy) Massimo Sigala	Porsche Type-935 2.6L Turbo Flat-6	**MI**	61
4	C1	18	(Switzerland) Brun Motorsport	(Argentina) Oscar Larrauri (Spain) Jesús Pareja	Porsche 962C	**MI**	61
4	C1	18	(Switzerland) Brun Motorsport	(Argentina) Oscar Larrauri (Spain) Jesús Pareja	Porsche Type-935 2.6L Turbo Flat-6	**MI**	61
5	C1	17	(Switzerland) Brun Motorsport	(United States) Drake Olson (Belgium) Thierry Boutsen	Porsche 962C	**MI**	61
5	C1	17	(Switzerland) Brun Motorsport	(United States) Drake Olson (Belgium) Thierry Boutsen	Porsche Type-935 2.6L Turbo Flat-6	**MI**	61
6	C1	2	(Germany) Rothmans Porsche	(Germany) Jochen Mass (France) Bob Wollek	Porsche 962C	**D**	61
6	C1	2	(Germany) Rothmans Porsche	(Germany) Jochen Mass (France) Bob Wollek	Porsche Type-935 2.6L Turbo Flat-6	**D**	61
7	C1	9	(Germany) Obermaier Racing	(Germany) Richard Hamann (Italy) Fulvio Ballabio	Porsche 956	**G**	61
7	C1	9	(Germany) Obermaier Racing	(Germany) Richard Hamann (Italy) Fulvio Ballabio	Porsche Type-935 2.6L Turbo Flat-6	**G**	61
8	C1	10	(Germany) Porsche Kremer Racing	(Austria) Jo Gartner (Germany) Klaus Niedzwiedz	Porsche 962C	**Y**	60
8	C1	10	(Germany) Porsche Kremer Racing	(Austria) Jo Gartner (Germany) Klaus Niedzwiedz	Porsche Type-935 2.6L Turbo Flat-6	**Y**	60
9	C1	61	(Switzerland) Kouros Racing Team	(France) Henri Pescarolo (Denmark) John Nielsen	Sauber C8	**G**	60
9	C1	61	(Switzerland) Kouros Racing Team	(France) Henri Pescarolo (Denmark) John Nielsen	Mercedes-Benz M117 5.0L Turbo V8	**G**	60
10	C1	33	(United Kingdom) John Fitzpatrick Racing	(Spain) Emilio de Villota (Spain) Fermín Vélez	Porsche 956B	**G**	59
10	C1	33	(United Kingdom) John Fitzpatrick Racing	(Spain) Emilio de Villota (Spain) Fermín Vélez	Porsche Type-935 2.6L Turbo Flat-6	**G**	59
11	**C2**	**74**	**(Germany) Gebhardt Motorsport**	**(Germany) Frank Jelinski (Sweden) Stanley Dickens**	**Gebhardt JC853**	**A**	**57**
11	**C2**	**74**	**(Germany) Gebhardt Motorsport**	**(Germany) Frank Jelinski (Sweden) Stanley Dickens**	**Ford Cosworth DFL 3.3L V8**	**A**	**57**
12	C1	63	(Germany) Ernst Schuster	(Germany) Ernst Schuster (Germany) Siegfried Brunn	Porsche 936C	**D**	56
12	C1	63	(Germany) Ernst Schuster	(Germany) Ernst Schuster (Germany) Siegfried Brunn	Porsche Type-962 2.8L Turbo Flat-6	**D**	56
13	C1	66	(United Kingdom) Cosmic Racing	(Greece) Costas Los	March 84G	**A**	56
13	C1	66	(United Kingdom) Cosmic Racing	(Greece) Costas Los	Porsche Type-935 2.6L Turbo Flat-6	**A**	56
14	C2	70	(United Kingdom) Spice Engineering	(United Kingdom) Gordon Spice (United Kingdom) Ray Bellm	Spice SE86C	**A**	55
14	C2	70	(United Kingdom) Spice Engineering	(United Kingdom) Gordon Spice (United Kingdom) Ray Bellm	Ford Cosworth DFL 3.3L V8	**A**	55
15	C2	89	(Norway) Martin Schanche Racing	(Norway) Martin Schanche (Norway) Birger Dyrstad	Argo JM19	**G**	55
15	C2	89	(Norway) Martin Schanche Racing	(Norway) Martin Schanche (Norway) Birger Dyrstad	Zakspeed 1.9L Turbo I4	**G**	55
16	**GTX**	**181**	**(Italy) "Victor"**	**(Italy) "Victor" (Italy) Toni Palma**	**Porsche 935**	?	**52**
16	**GTX**	**181**	**(Italy) "Victor"**	**(Italy) "Victor" (Italy) Toni Palma**	**Porsche Type-930 3.2L Turbo Flat-6**	?	**52**
17	C2	105	(Italy) Kelmar Racing	(Italy) Pasquale Barberio (Switzerland) Jean-Pierre Frey	Tiga GC85	**A**	49
17	C2	105	(Italy) Kelmar Racing	(Italy) Pasquale Barberio (Switzerland) Jean-Pierre Frey	Ford Cosworth DFL 3.3L V8	**A**	49
18 NC	C2	80	(Italy) Jolly Club (Italy) Carma F.F. SRL	(Italy) Carlo Facetti (Italy) Martino Finotto	Alba AR6	**A**	33
18 NC	C2	80	(Italy) Jolly Club (Italy) Carma F.F. SRL	(Italy) Carlo Facetti (Italy) Martino Finotto	Carma FF 1.9L Turbo I4	**A**	33
19 DNF	C1	52	(United Kingdom) Silk Cut Jaguar	(France) Jean-Louis Schlesser (Italy) Gianfranco Brancatelli	Jaguar XJR-6	**D**	61
19 DNF	C1	52	(United Kingdom) Silk Cut Jaguar	(France) Jean-Louis Schlesser (Italy) Gianfranco Brancatelli	Jaguar 6.5L V12	**D**	61
20 DNF	C1	8	(Germany) Joest Racing	(Germany) "John Winter" (Belgium) Marc Duez	Porsche 956	**G**	60
20 DNF	C1	8	(Germany) Joest Racing	(Germany) "John Winter" (Belgium) Marc Duez	Porsche Type-935 2.6L Turbo Flat-6	**G**	60
21 DNF	C2	75	(United Kingdom) ADA Engineering	(United Kingdom) Evan Clements (United Kingdom) Ian Harrower	Gebhardt JC843	**A**	55
21 DNF	C2	75	(United Kingdom) ADA Engineering	(United Kingdom) Evan Clements (United Kingdom) Ian Harrower	Ford Cosworth DFL 3.3L V8	**A**	55
22 DNF	C1	7	(Germany) Joest Racing	(Germany) Klaus Ludwig (Italy) Paolo Barilla	Porsche 956B	**G**	50
22 DNF	C1	7	(Germany) Joest Racing	(Germany) Klaus Ludwig (Italy) Paolo Barilla	Porsche Type-935 2.6L Turbo Flat-6	**G**	50
23 DNF	C1	51	(United Kingdom) Silk Cut Jaguar	(United Kingdom) Derek Warwick (United States) Eddie Cheever	Jaguar XJR-6	**D**	47
23 DNF	C1	51	(United Kingdom) Silk Cut Jaguar	(United Kingdom) Derek Warwick (United States) Eddie Cheever	Jaguar 6.5L V12	**D**	47
24 DNF	C2	77	(United Kingdom) Chamberlain Engineering	(United Kingdom) Gareth Chapman (United Kingdom) Will Hoy	Tiga TS85	**A**	44
24 DNF	C2	77	(United Kingdom) Chamberlain Engineering	(United Kingdom) Gareth Chapman (United Kingdom) Will Hoy	Hart 418T 1.8L Turbo I4	**A**	44
25 DNF	C2	99	(United Kingdom) Roy Baker Promotions	(United Kingdom) Dudley Wood (Denmark) Thorkild Thyrring	Tiga GC285	**A**	14
25 DNF	C2	99	(United Kingdom) Roy Baker Promotions	(United Kingdom) Dudley Wood (Denmark) Thorkild Thyrring	Ford Cosworth BDT 1.7L Turbo I4	**A**	14
26 DNF	C2	83	(Italy) Techno Racing	(Italy) Luigi Taverna (Italy) Mario Sala	Alba AR3	**A**	11
26 DNF	C2	83	(Italy) Techno Racing	(Italy) Luigi Taverna (Italy) Mario Sala	Ford Cosworth DFL 3.3L V8	**A**	11
27 DNF	C2	92	(France) Automobiles Louis Descartes	(France) Louis Descartes (France) Jacques Heuclin	ALD 02	**A**	4
27 DNF	C2	92	(France) Automobiles Louis Descartes	(France) Louis Descartes (France) Jacques Heuclin	BMW M88 3.5L I6	**A**	4
DNS	C2	72	(United Kingdom) Chevron Racing (United Kingdom) John Bartlett Racing	(United Kingdom) Roger Andreason (Morocco) Max Cohen-Olivar	Chevron B62	?	-
DNS	C2	72	(United Kingdom) Chevron Racing (United Kingdom) John Bartlett Racing	(United Kingdom) Roger Andreason (Morocco) Max Cohen-Olivar	Ford Cosworth DFV 3.0L V8	?	-

== Statistics ==
- Pole Position - #4 Martini Racing - 1:32.320
- Fastest Lap - #4 Martini Racing - 1:36.960
- Average Speed - 201.746 km/h

World Sportscar Championship
Previous race: None	1986 season	Next race: 1986 1000 km of Silverstone
