= Shah Alam Circuit =

Racing circuit in Shah Alam, Malaysia

- Location: Shah Alam, Selangor, Malaysia
- Coordinates: 03°04′34″N 101°32′38″E
- Opened: 8 September 1968; 57 years ago
- Closed: 2003
- Architect: John Hugenholtz
- Former names: Batu Tiga Speedway Circuit
- Major events: Malaysian Grand Prix (1968–1975, 1977–1982, 1995); Grand Prix motorcycle racing Malaysian motorcycle Grand Prix (1991–1997); World SBK (1990–1991); World Sportscar Championship (1985); Asia Road Racing Championship (1996, 2001–2002); Asian Touring Car Championship (2000–2001); Formula Asia (1996, 2000–2001); 1998 Commonwealth Games

Grand Prix Circuit (1985–2003)
- Length: 3.693 km (2.295 mi)
- Turns: 15
- Race lap record: 1:24.520 ( (West Germany) Jochen Mass, Porsche 962C, 1985, Group C)

Original Circuit (1968–1984)
- Length: 3.380 km (2.100 mi)
- Turns: 12
- Race lap record: 1:16.400 ( (United Kingdom) Tiff Needell, March 79B, 1980, Formula Pacific)

Shah Alam Circuit or Batu Tiga Speedway Circuit was a racing circuit in Shah Alam, Selangor, Malaysia. The circuit layout was designed by Dutchman John Hugenholtz.

== History ==
The circuit was opened in 1968. The 1968 Malaysian Grand Prix was held there on 8 September as a Formula Libre race and was won by Indonesian Hengkie Irawan driving an Elfin 600. The circuit was the venue for the Malaysian Grand Prix until 1982, with the starting field consisting alternately of vehicles from the Formula Atlantic, Formula Pacific or Formula 2.

The circuit was closed in 1977 after an accident that killed six children, although it later reopened after improvements of fences and guard rails around the track were carried out. In 1985 the track was lengthened from 3.380 km (2.100 mi) to 3.693 km (2.295 mi) with the addition of the curve 11. In the same year, the first international racing event was held. Titled as the 1985 800 km of Selangor, the race was the tenth and final round of the 1985 World Endurance Championship, and was won by Jacky Ickx and Jochen Mass driving a Porsche 962C.

The circuit hosted rounds of the Superbike World Championship in the 1990 and 1991, and from 1991 to 1997 it hosted the Malaysian motorcycle Grand Prix. Mick Doohan is the all-time leader in motorcycle Grand Prix victories at the venue, winning the event four times. The motorcycle Grand Prix was later moved to the Johor Circuit, and later to the Sepang International Circuit.

In 1998 the road cycling events for the 1998 Commonwealth Games was held at the circuit from 11 to 21 September.

In 2003 the circuit was sold by Selangor state government to a property developer, which then developed the area into a luxury housing project by the name D'Kayangan.

== Details ==
The Batu Tiga Speedway Circuit Track Details In Brief:

- Total Area: 143 acres (0.58 km^{2})
- No. of Pits: 57 units, 42 units concrete pit (22' x 17'), 15 units wooden pits (22' x 7')
- Spectator capacity: Covered grandstand - 8000, Uncovered grandstand - 18,000
- Track length: 3.380 km (2.100 mi) (1968–1984) / 3.693 km (2.295 mi) (1985–2003)
- No. of Turns: 14. Left -4, Right -10
- Straights: 3. The longest straight was 600 m (2,000 ft)
- Gate Entrances: 3

== Lap records ==
The fastest official race lap records at the Shah Alam Circuit are listed as:

Category	Time	Driver	Vehicle	Event
Grand Prix Circuit (1985–2003): 3.693 km (2.295 mi)
Group C	1:24.520	Jochen Mass	Porsche 962C	1985 800 km of Selangor
500cc	1:24.840	Mick Doohan	Honda NSR500 (NV0X)	1997 Malaysian motorcycle Grand Prix
250cc	1:25.994	Max Biaggi	Aprilia RSV 250	1996 Malaysian motorcycle Grand Prix
World SBK	1:28.690	Doug Polen	Ducati 888 SBK	1991 Shah Alam World SBK round
Asian Formula 2000	1:29.979	Parthiva Sureshwaren	Argo Formula Asia	2000 Shah Alam Formula Asia 2000 round
125cc	1:31.594	Emilio Alzamora	Honda RS125R	1996 Malaysian motorcycle Grand Prix
Supersport	1:32.590	Toshiyuki Hamaguchi	Suzuki GSX-R600	2002 Shah Alam ARRC round
Super 2000	1:38.820	Charles Kwan	BMW 320i	2000 Shah Alam ATCC round
Original Circuit (1968–1984): 3.380 km (2.100 mi)
Formula Pacific	1:16.400	Tiff Needell	March 79B	1980 Selangor Grand Prix
Formula Two	1:21.000	Ken Smith	March 782	1979 Malaysian Grand Prix
Formula Atlantic	1:22.700	John MacDonald	Brabham BT40	1973 Malaysian Grand Prix
Formula Libre	1:25.700	Max Stewart	Brabham BT11	1968 Malaysian Grand Prix
Tasman Formula	1:31.500	Tony Maw	Elfin Type 600	1969 Malaysian Grand Prix

== In popular culture ==
The track was used as one of the shooting locations for Jackie Chan's 1995 film Thunderbolt.

== See also ==
- Malaysian Grand Prix
- Mohamed Khir bin Toyo
