= Jaguar XJR-6 =

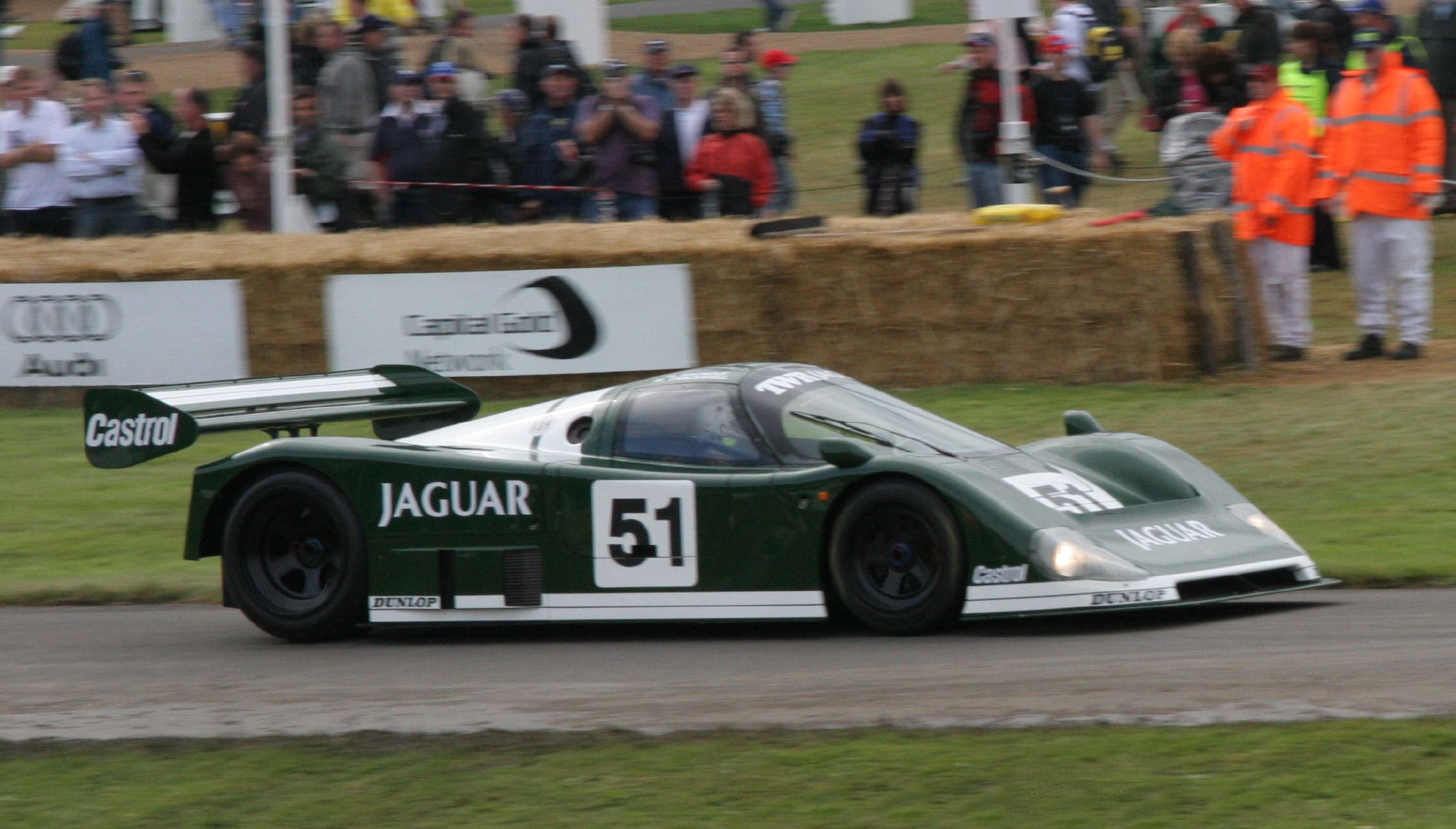
- Category: Group C1
- Constructor: Jaguar
- Designer: Tony Southgate
- Successor: Jaguar XJR-8

Technical specifications
- Chassis: Carbon fibre monocoque
- Suspension (front): double wishbones, pushrod-activated coil springs over dampers
- Suspension (rear): double wishbones, magnesium uprights, coil springs over dampers
- Engine: 6.2 litre (1985) / 6.3 litre (1986) Jaguar V12 Rear mid-engine, rear-wheel-drive layout
- Transmission: 5-speed March/TWR manual
- Tyres: Dunlop

Competition history
- Notable entrants: (United Kingdom) Jaguar (United Kingdom) Silk Cut Jaguar
- Debut: 1985 1000 km of Mosport

The Jaguar XJR-6 is a Group C sports prototype race car, designed, developed and built by TWR, with the aim of competing, from 1985, in the World Sportscar Championship. A total of six Jaguar XJR-6s were built and they contested in the World Sportscar Championship until 1986, before Jaguar replaced them with the Jaguar XJR-8.

== Development history ==
Following their success with the Jaguar XJS in the European Touring Car Championship, Tom Walkinshaw Racing were recruited by Jaguar to develop a Group C race car. Designer Tony Southgate drew on his work with the Ford C100 and came up with a revolutionary (for Group C) carbon-fibre monocoque incorporating ground-effect venturi. Power came from the Jaguar V12 engine, enlarged to 6.2 litres and fitted with a TWR/Zytec fuel-injection system which developed 660 bhp. Front and rear suspension was provided by double wishbones, with push-rod-activated coil springs over dampers at the front and magnesium uprights with coil springs over dampers at the rear. The car was named in the same style, and in numerical succession to Bob Tullius' Group 44 IMSA GTP Jaguars, although there was no connection between the two teams.

== Race history ==
The XJR-6 made its debut late in the 1985 season at the 1000 Kilometres of Mosport in Canada. Two cars were entered and qualified third and fifth. One car retired after 12 laps with a failed wheel bearing, but Martin Brundle, Mike Thackwell and Jean-Louis Schlesser brought the other car home in third place, albeit 19 laps down on the winning Porsche 962C. At Spa, Brundle and Thackwell finished fifth while Schlesser and Hans Heyer retired their ill-handling car. Both cars retired at Brands Hatch and were withdrawn at Fuji due to bad weather. At the final race of the season at Selangor, Thackwell and John Nielsen finished second.

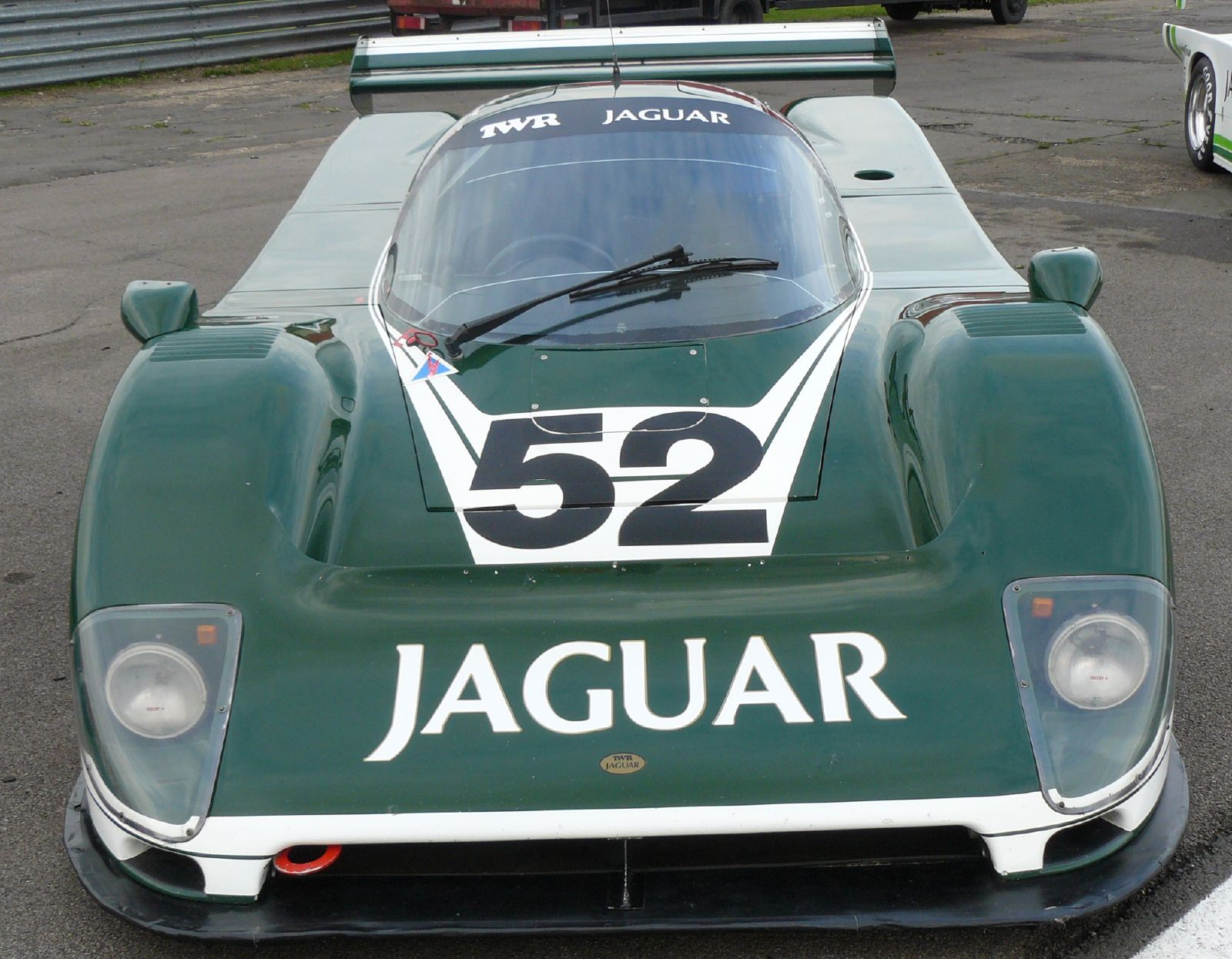
Jaguar XJR-6

In 1986, with the team now sponsored by Silk Cut cigarettes and having undergone a major weight loss programme, a full season's campaign was carried out, with the best result being a win at Silverstone for Eddie Cheever and Derek Warwick. All three cars retired at Le Mans. Cheever and Warwick were second and third at the Norisring and both shared third place at Fuji, while Warwick and Jan Lammers were second at Spa. The season ended with third place in the Teams Championship, and third place for Warwick in the Drivers Championship.

== See also ==
- Jaguar XJR Sportscars
