= March 84G =

Sports prototype race car

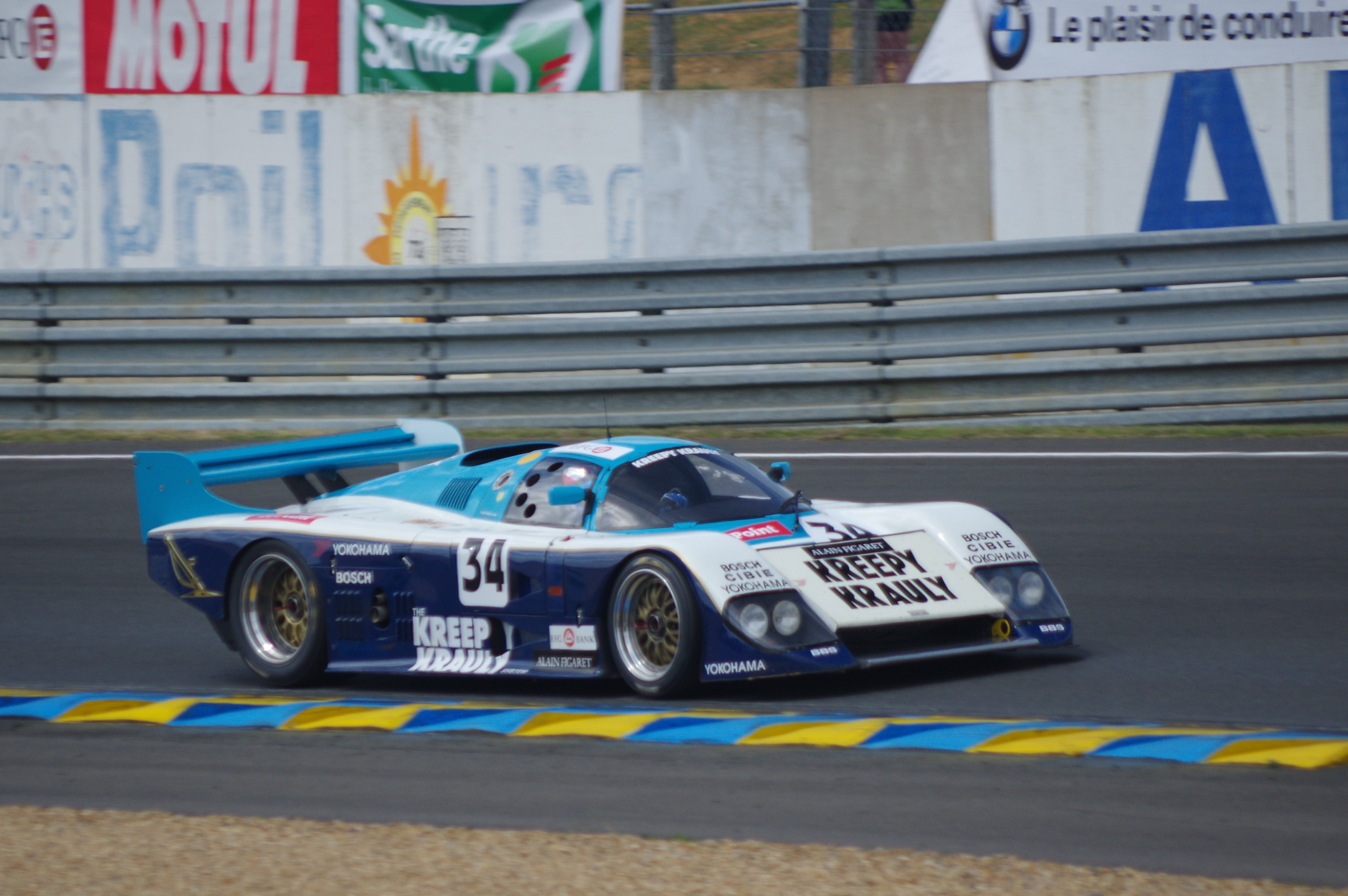
- Category: Group C/IMSA GTP
- Constructor: March Engineering
- Designer(s): Max Sardou; Adrian Newey; Robin Herd
- Successor: March 85G

Technical specifications
- Chassis: Honeycomb aluminium monocoque with semi-stressed engine, kevlar/carbon fiber body
- Suspension: Double wishbones, coil springs over dampers, anti-roll bar
- Axle track: 1,565 mm (61.6 in) (front); 1,539 mm (60.6 in) (rear)
- Wheelbase: 2,685 mm (105.7 in)
- Engine: Buick/Porsche/Chevrolet 3.0–5.7 L (183.1–347.8 cu in) V6/B6/V8 naturally-aspirated mid-engined
- Transmission: 5-speed manual
- Power: ~ 620 hp (460 kW)
- Weight: 900 kg (1,984.2 lb)

Competition history
- Debut: 1983 3 Hours of Daytona
Races	Wins	Podiums
110	5	10

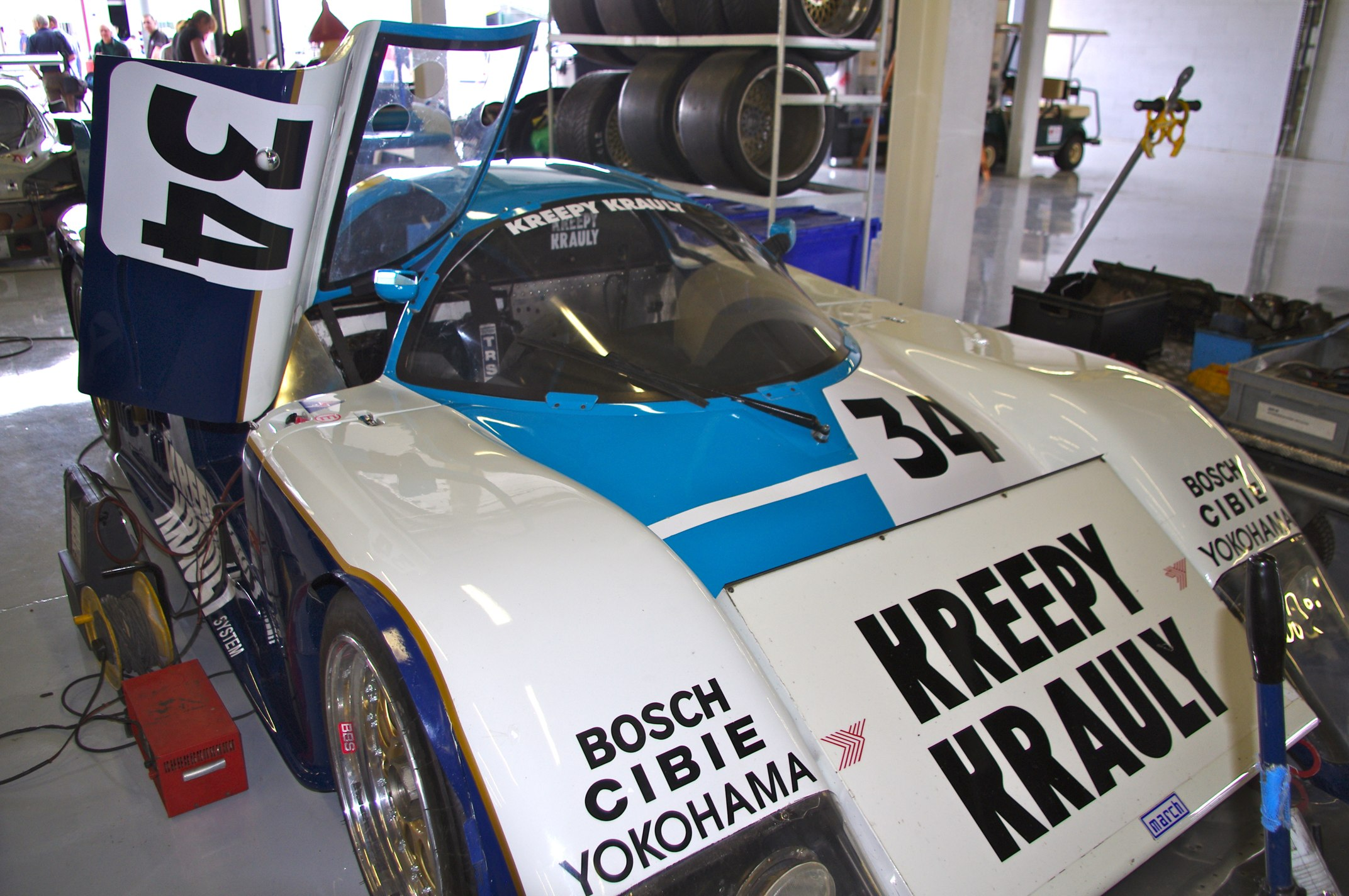
March 84G in pits with door open

The March 84G was a mid-engined Group C and IMSA racing sports prototype, designed and developed by March Engineering in late 1983 and used in sports car racing until 1989. It was powered by a number of different engines, including a Chevrolet small-block, a Buick V6, a Porsche flat-six, and even a Mazda 13B Wankel rotary engine. Power output was around 620 hp (460 kW). It only managed to score 5 wins, and clinch a total of 10 podium, over the course of 7 years and 119 race entries.
