= 1986 24 Hours of Le Mans =

54th 24 Hours of Le Mans endurance race

Previous: 1985	Next: 1987
Index: Races | Winners

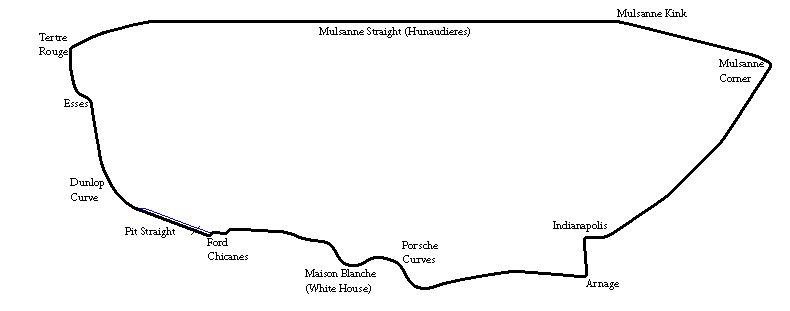
Le Mans in 1986

The 1986 24 Hours of Le Mans was the 54th Grand Prix of Endurance as well as the third round of the 1986 World Sports-Prototype Championship. It took place at the Circuit de la Sarthe, France, on 31 May and 1 June 1986. This year saw the return of a full Jaguar works team, to take on the strong Porsche works and customer teams. However, with the fuel regulations relaxed, the turbo-charged cars would be able to use more of their potential power to outrun the normally-aspirated 6-litre Jaguars.

Although the works Porsche team locked out the front row of the grid, the Joest car (victor in 1984 and 1985) took the challenge to them from the start of the race and holding the lead till nightfall. The Jaguar team was competitive but gradually fell behind, leading the rest of the field until forced out with transmission and suspension problems. Early on Sunday morning, third-placed Jochen Mass crashed out when he hit the C2 class-leading Ecosse of Mike Wilds who had spun on oil dropped in the Porsche Curves. Soon after however, there was a far worse incident when Jo Gartner was involved in a violent accident at very high speed as he accelerated onto the back straight. A transmission failure speared the Kremer Porsche into the barriers, and then got airborne hitting a telephone pole before ending upside down on fire, killing the driver instantly. The race was put behind pace cars for two hours to repair the damage.

While behind the pace-car the Joest car's engine failed, ending their chance for a third victory. From there, the works Porsche of Derek Bell and Hans-Joachim Stuck was untroubled and took a comfortable victory by a margin of 8 laps over the Brun Porsche of Oscar Larrauri, Jesús Pareja and Joël Gouhier. Bell joined an elite group of drivers with four Le Mans victories. Despite being the last classified finisher after a number of delays, the new Spice-Fiero won the Index of Thermal Efficiency prize.

== Regulations ==
The FIA (Fédération Internationale de l'Automobile) changed the championship format this year, introducing several shorter-length races among the longer, endurance events. The name was changed to the World Sports-Prototype Championship, to take the emphasis off endurance racing. They also relaxed the fuel-restrictions. The C1 and GTP classes now had 2550 litres, up from 2210 litres, while the Class C2 went up from 1430 to 1650 litres. The fuel-rigs had the fuel-flow adjusted from 50 to 60 litres per minute, trimming the time for a full refuel by about 20 seconds.

FISA was risking alienating the manufacturers, with little consultation, with rules changes notified with relatively short notice. The Sports-Prototype Commission had only a single manufacturer's representative with the majority being from the race-tracks.

The public roads section of the circuit got a small modification this year. The département installed a roundabout at the Mulsanne corner as it was an accident black-spot. This in turn necessitated a section be built bypassing the roundabout, shortening the racetrack by 98 metres (320 feet). After the serious accidents in the previous year's race, the ACO (Automobile Club de l'Ouest) started putting triple-tier Armco along the length of the Hunaudières straight. The ACO also re-initiated the pre-race test-day (last run in 1974), however only 17 cars availed themselves of the opportunity.

Finally, the hors course rule was reinstated, again given the number of cars running with mechanical unreliability posed a safety issue to the other cars running at full pace. This time it was modified to apply within the final four hours to disqualify any car that had run less than 60% of the distance of the leader.

== Entries ==
The biggest news was the full return of the works Jaguar team to the World Championship, and they had immediate success in the first two races in the series. This brought English fans to Le Mans in record numbers. Lancia had also run those first two races, but being outshone by Porsche and now Jaguar, chose to withdraw and focus on rallying. The increasing interest in Group C now saw Nissan join Toyota and Mazda from Japan in the top classes, to challenge the European manufacturers. For the first time since 1956 there were no American teams entered.

Class	Quantity	Turbo/Rotary engines
Group C1	34 / 29	26 / 24
IMSA-GTP	3 / 3	3 / 3
Group C2	26 / 16	9 / 5
Group B	2 / 1	1 / 0
IMSA-GTX	1 / 1	1 / 1
Total Entries	66 / 50	40 / 33

- Note: The first number is the number accepted, the second the number who started.

=== Group C1 and GTP ===
Once again, Porsche dominated the C1 entry-list with the mix of 962 and 956 models. The Rothmans Porsche works team arrived with the same four chassis that it had used in 1985, including the T-car. With the retirement of Jacky Ickx, the lead #1 car was now run by Derek Bell and Hans-Joachim Stuck, with 1983 winner Al Holbert brought in with them for this race. Bob Wollek had left Lancia at the end of last season. He was promptly picked up by the works team to run the #2 car with Jochen Mass. The third car, just running at Le Mans, and driven by Vern Schuppan and Drake Olson, was fitted with Porsche's experimental, new, dual-clutch PDK transmission that offered automatic electronic gearshifts (and an in-car camera).

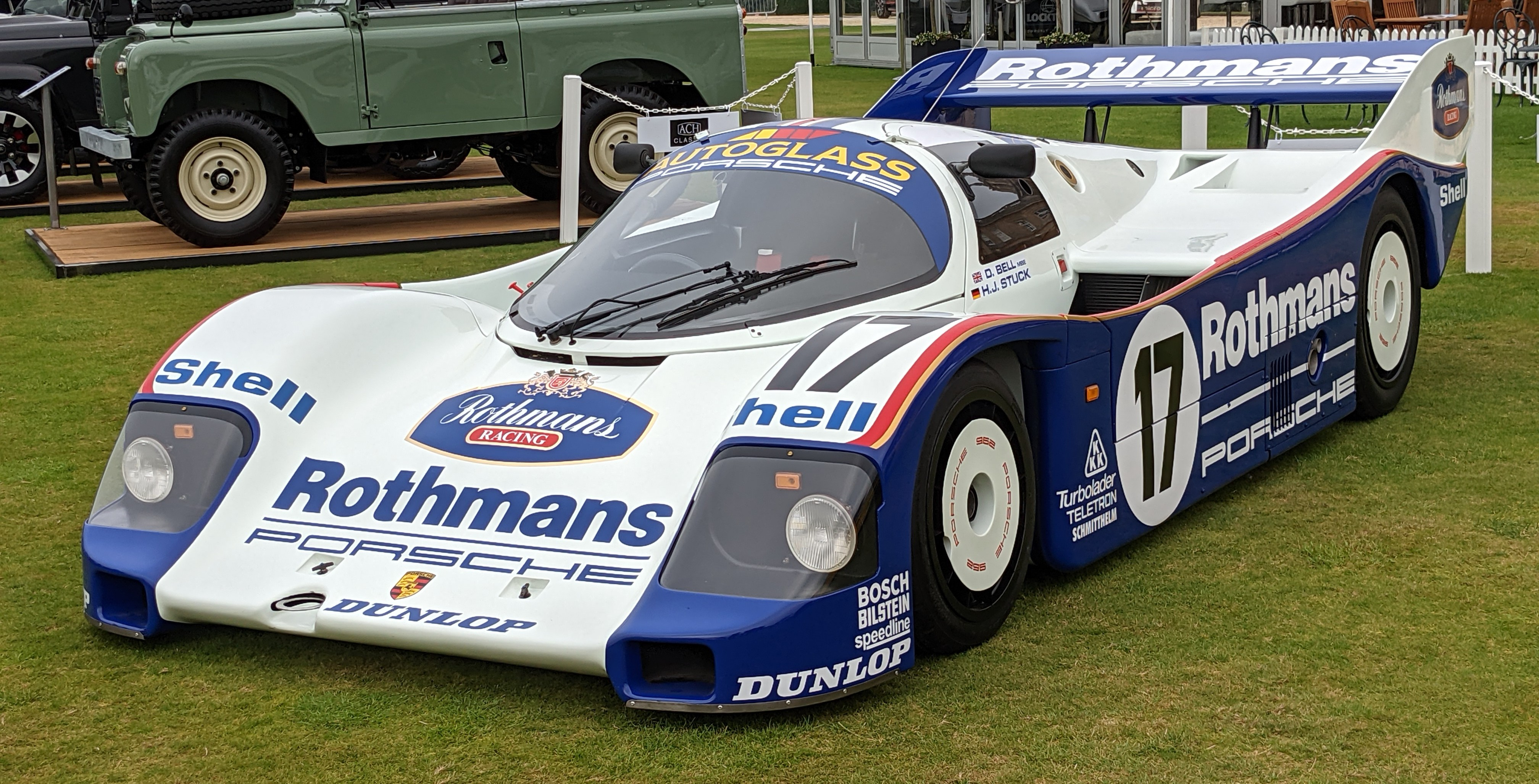
Porsche 962

The Porsche customer teams were again proving very competitive. Joest Racing had upheld Porsche honour, winning in 1983, and then beating the works team in 1984. This year, they brought that same lucky 956B chassis back with the same winning trio - Klaus Ludwig, Paolo Barilla and Louis Krages. In the absence of any American teams, Joest ran an all-American crew in their second car. Decked out in stars-and-stripes livery, Kenper Miller drove with former Can-Am champion George Follmer (20 years after his other Le Mans appearance) and John Morton. Getting racetime, the latter two had run with Barilla, the only Joest entry at the prior round at Silverstone where they finished sixth. Brun Motorsport had three cars in the championship this year, made up of a pair of 962Cs (built at their own workshop) and their 956 workhorse. Owner Walter Brun stepped up to the lead car for Le Mans with Massimo Sigala and Frank Jelinski, bought in as a replacement for Stefan Bellof, killed in 1985. The other regular drivers Oscar Larrauri and Jésus Pareja, joined by Joël Gouhier, had the second 962C; while the 956 was driven by Thierry Boutsen/Didier Theys/Alain Ferté. Kremer Racing were also regrouping after the death of their lead driver, Manfred Winkelhock. Austrian Jo Gartner came into the team, having won the Sebring 12 Hours earlier in the year with Stuck and Bob Akin. After a 3rd-place at Silverstone with Tiff Needell, he would race with Sarel van der Merwe and Kunimitsu Takahashi in the 962C. The team also brought out their 956 for Moroccan Max Cohen-Olivar and Frenchmen Pierre Yver and Hubert Striebig. The John Fitzpatrick Racing team, likewise entered their 962C and reliable 956B (in conjunction with the Spanish Danone Porsche team). In the 1985 race, Richard Lloyd's modified 956B had been the only car able to keep up with the Joest car. Now renamed the RLR Liqui Moly team, they had drivers Mauro Baldi, Rob Dyson and Price Cobb. Hans Obermeier's team again returned with their 956. An outlier entry was the ex-Joest Porsche 936CJ car. Last seen in 1983, it had been purchased by German Ernst Schuster and entered again. In total, Porsche would field an impressive armada of 15 cars in the top class. There was also an interesting internal Porsche tyre-battle brewing: Of the major teams, the works team had a long-standing relationship with Dunlop, Kremer had a new contract with Yokohama while Joest, JFR and Richard Lloyd ran with Goodyear. With Lancia's withdrawal, Michelin switched to support the Brun team.

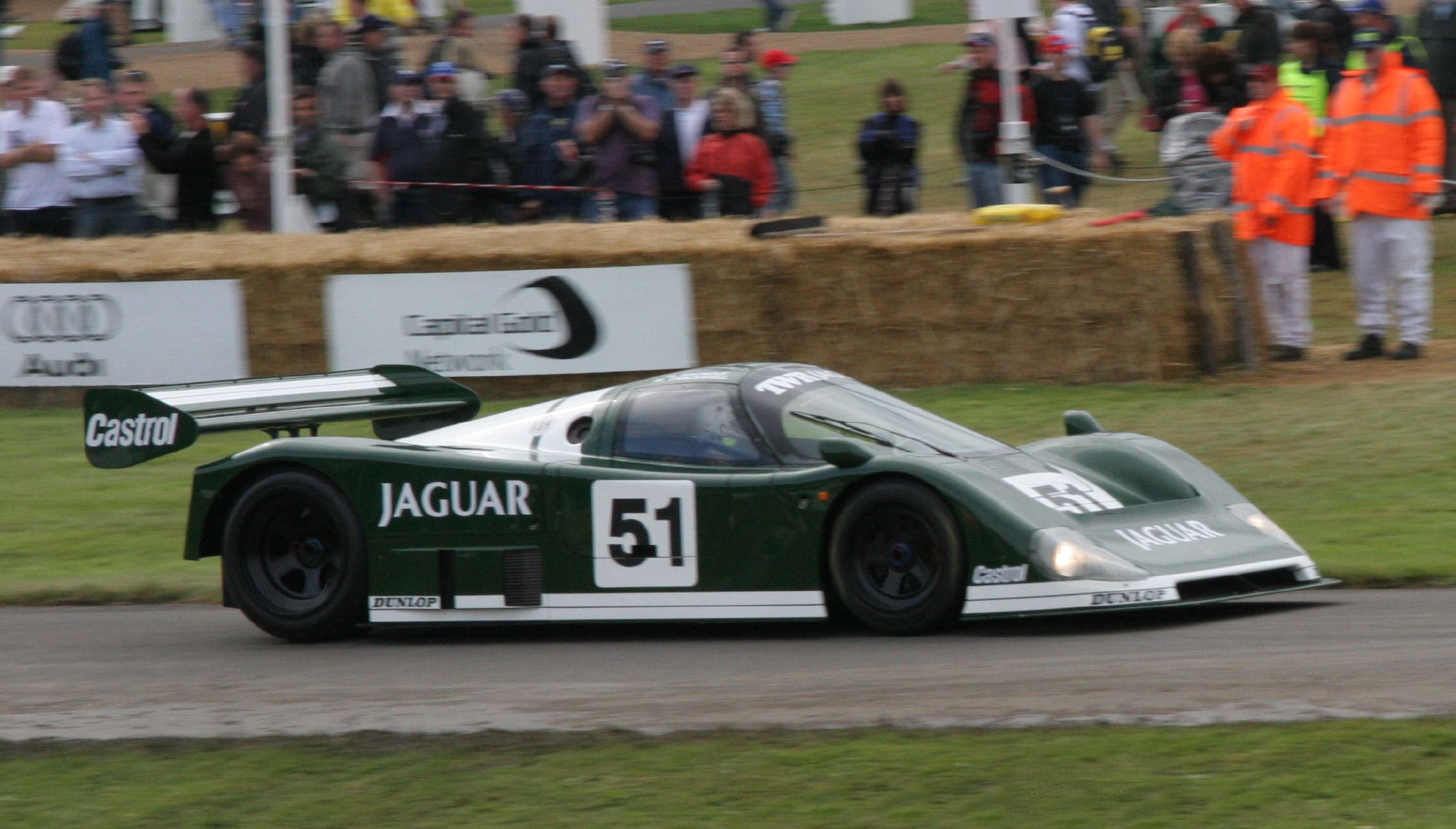
Jaguar XJR-6

Jaguar Cars had been impressed with the strong effort in the past seasons by the American Group 44 Racing team of Bob Tullius. The company thought a full works effort was viable, but instead chose to ally with Tom Walkinshaw Racing - who had latterly been running the Jaguar XJ-S in the ETCC (European Touring Car Championship). Designer Tony Southgate (who had worked with Shadow, Lotus and Theodore in F1) had produced the new XJR-6 model and it had run in the latter-half of last season. In the close-season, much work was done to simplify and lighten the key components. The twin-valve 6.0-litre V12 engine had a single-overhead camshaft, with a 60 degree cylinder angle. TWR's engine-specialist, Allan Scott, could tune the engine to 630 bhp, with a top speed of 370 kp/h (230 mph). It was fitted to a March-Hewland gearbox with the suspension running large 19" wheels, and the longtail body-styling gave it 70% more downforce than the Porsches. The season drivers were current F1 drivers Eddie Cheever/Derek Warwick, and Jean-Louis Schlesser/Gianfranco Brancatelli (current ETCC champion). For Le Mans, Schlesser joined the first car, and TWR driver Win Percy joined Brancatelli in the second. A third car had former Group 44 teammates Brian Redman and Hurley Haywood, with Hans Heyer. The team had an excellent lead-up, with Warwick and Cheever winning the Silverstone round, and then Cheever throwing down the gauntlet to Porsche with the fastest times at the test-day.

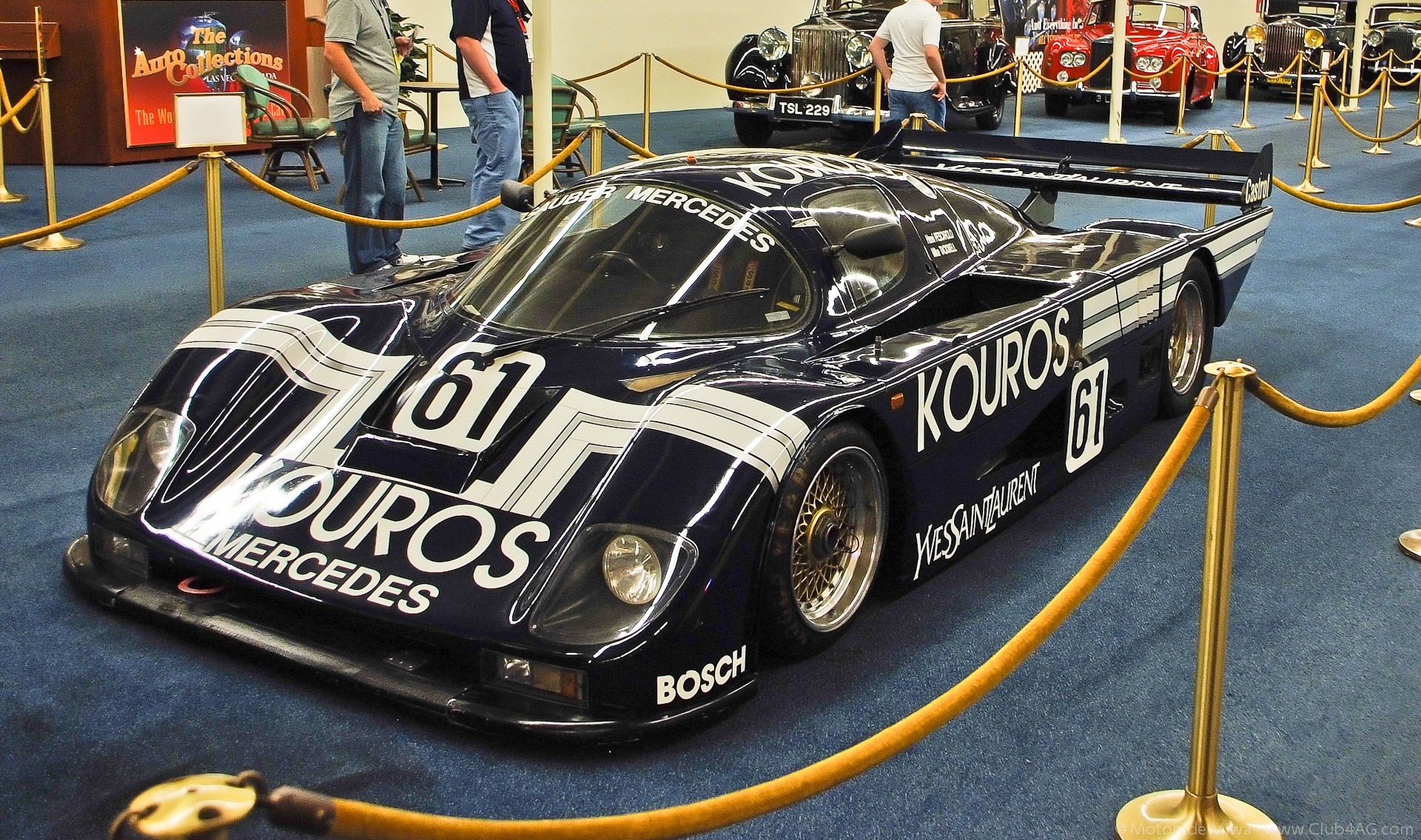
Sauber C8

Sauber had a difficult return to Le Mans in 1985. The C8 of John Nielsen had got airborne and flipped on the Mulsanne straight during practice, but subsequent analysis showed that it was due to mechanical failure not the fault of aerodynamic design. Development continued on the car, and engine, but downforce remained an issue and the top speed was limited to 330 kp/h (205 mph). Mercedes-Benz, however, stayed committed to the project, and was able to secure considerable sponsorship from Kouros cosmetics. This money could draw in experienced drivers and for Le Mans they had 4-time winner Henri Pescarolo, with F1 driver Christian Danner and Dieter Quester in one car and Nielsen co-driving Mike Thackwell in the other. There were concerns, though, regarding the fuel economy as the Silverstone entry had encountered issues toward the end of that race.

Both the Dome and TOM'S Racing teams returned to Le Mans, with the latest Dome-Toyota model. The 86C was built on a strengthened aluminium monocoque chassis. Adjustments were made to the Toyota 2.1-litre turbo engine to improve fuel economy, however its unsatisfactory power output meant it could not keep pace with the Porsches. For Le Mans, the two cars were fitted with longtail bodyshells. All the drivers returned, although the teams were rearranged – Geoff Lees/Satoru Nakajima/Masanori Sekiya ran the TOM'S car, while new man Beppe Gabbiani (ex-Lancia) joined Eje Elgh and Toshio Suzuki were in the Dome entry.

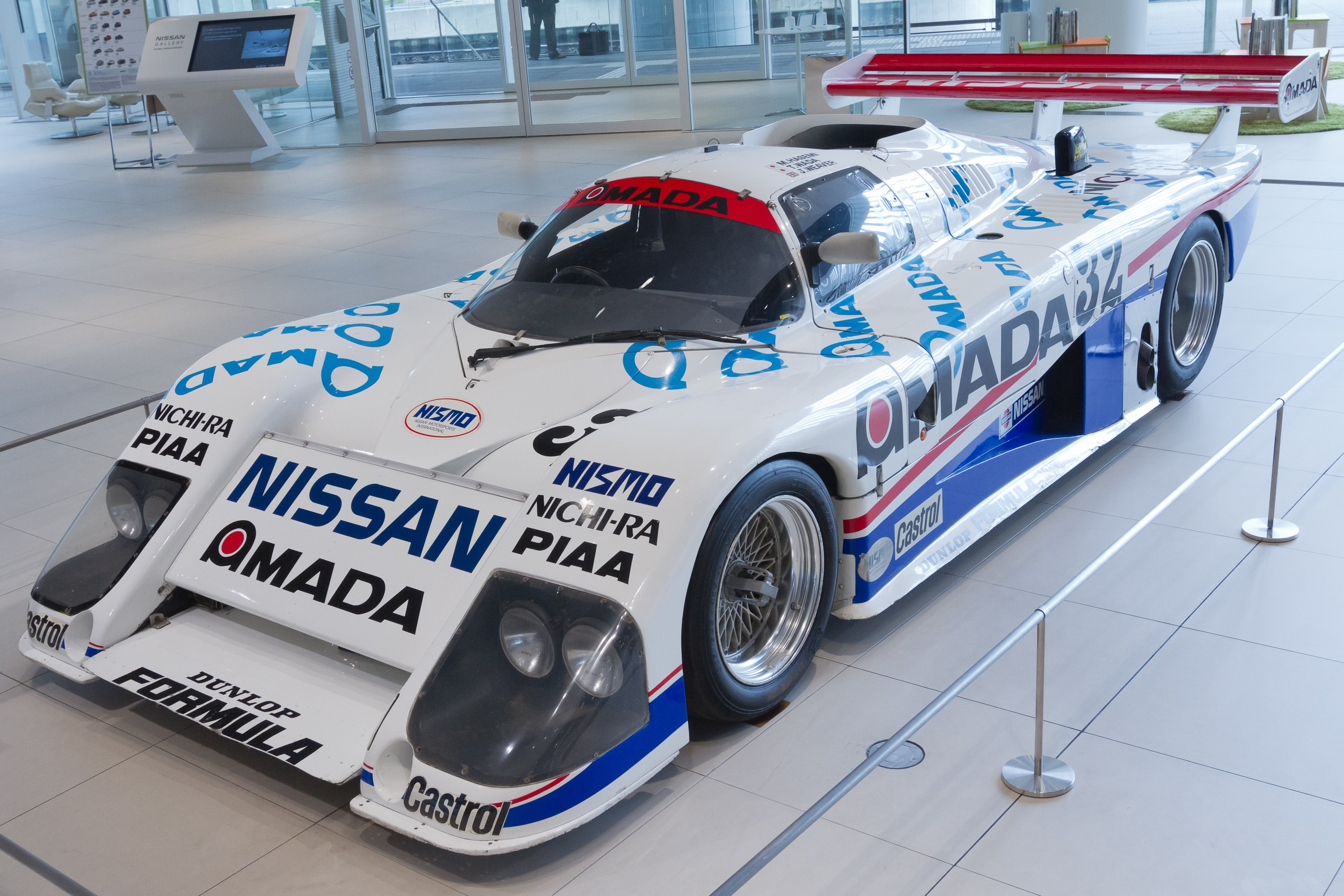
Nissan R85V

Nissan followed Mazda and Toyota into the broader Group C series. They had previously run cars in the home races at Fuji Speedway, and in September 1984 they set up NISMO, as a dedicated motorsport division in the company. Its initial thrust was into the IMSA competition with Nissan engines in March chassis. The VG30ET was a new development of the Nissan VG engine. A 3.0-litre V6 unit, with twin Garrett turbos, it could produce 700 bhp. In a torrential downpour, Kazuyoshi Hoshino had won the Fuji 1000 the previous October with a March-Nissan 85G, beating the international teams. In December, NISMO ordered three further March chassis and got Gordon Coppuck to design the new car – the Nissan R86V, with the VG30 engine. One R86V came to Le Mans, for Hoshino, with single-seater drivers Aguri Suzuki and Keiji Matsumoto. They also sent an older R85V, for veteran drivers Masahiro Hasemi and Takao Wada. NISMO President Yasuharu Nanba came with orders for the cars to finish at all costs. March brought in Keith Greene as team manager and James Weaver for the Le Mans expertise. With March now working with Nissan, it fell to privateers to represent the brand. English-based, Greek driver Costas Los had bought the March 84G from the Kreepy Krauly team, running it again in the C1 class. Meanwhile, Richard Cleare had bought an IMSA March 85G, fitted an older single-turbo Porsche engine, and entered it in the GTP class. Mazdaspeed stepped up its racing program this year, moving from C2 into the IMSA GTP class. The new Mazda 757 was designed by Nigel Stroud on a honeycomb monocoque chassis and covered with a carbon-fibre/Kevlar bodyshell. It was planned to have a turbo-charged rotary engine, but until that was built, it was fitted with the new 13G, the first triple-rotor Wankel rotary. The three 654cc chambers were given the FIA equivalent of 3924cc and put out 450 bhp. This could get the cars up to 310 kp/h (195 mph). They were much lighter than all the C1 cars, even 40 kg lighter than the little WMs. Two cars came to Le Mans, along with a T-car. The Japanese works drivers returned (Terada, Yorino and Katayama). David Kennedy led the second car, this time joined by Pierre Dieudonné and Mark Galvin.

Local engineer/driver Yves Courage continued development of the Cougar C12. Further wind-tunnel work tweaked the aerodynamics, while new 19" rear wheels needed a complete suspension redesign. Overall, the car was now 45 kg lighter. Courage once again had fellow garagista Alain de Cadenet as a co-driver along with F3000 talent Pierre-Henri Raphanel. With the new fuel regulations, the WM Secateva team split its entries with a W85 in each class. The C1 version kept the 2850cc twin-turbo Peugeot engine and could now get up to 370 kp/h (230 mph). Team regulars Pignard and Raulet were joined this year by F1, and Le Mans, veteran François Migault. The C2 car had a modified two-valve 2650cc engine and ZF gearbox, in place of the usual Hewland unit. Team principal Roger Dorchy raced this one, with Claude Haldi and Pascal Pessiot. Despite the recent death of the Rondeau founder, Jean Rondeau, there were two of the cars entered in C1. Graff Racing had heavily modified the bodyshell of their M482, and was fitted with the in-car camera for "La Cinq" TV Channel. The second car was an older M382 that Patrick Oudet had purchased off Christian Bussi. Tim Lee-Davey embarked on a program to modify one of his Tiga GC84 cars to C1 standard. The plan was to fit a turbocharged Cosworth DFL engine, linked to a Hewland transmission and with the Bosch Motronic engine-management system. Lee-Davey had co-owner Australian Neil Crang as co-driver along with John Gimbel.

=== Group C2 ===
Spice Engineering had won the inaugural C2 championship last year and was now building its own cars for the C2 class. They were also commissioned by Pontiac to build cars to compete in the IMSA series, fitted with its engine (as the Spice-Fiero). The benefit to Spice was that the team had access to the wind-tunnel at General Motors in Detroit to refine their aerodynamics. Three chassis were sent to IMSA, one sold to Hugh Chamberlain for a Hart engine, while one stayed with the team to race. Fitted with a 3.3-litre Cosworth DFL, tuned by John Nicholson, they had won the second round at Silverstone. Team principals Gordon Spice and Ray Bellm sequestered Jean-Michel Martin as their third driver for the race. With Spice now building their own cars, Tiga Race Cars targeted their new GC286 model for the IMSA Lights series. Two chassis were also sold to Roy Baker, fitted with the turbocharged Cosworth BDT rally engine, reduced from 1.8 to 1.7-litres.

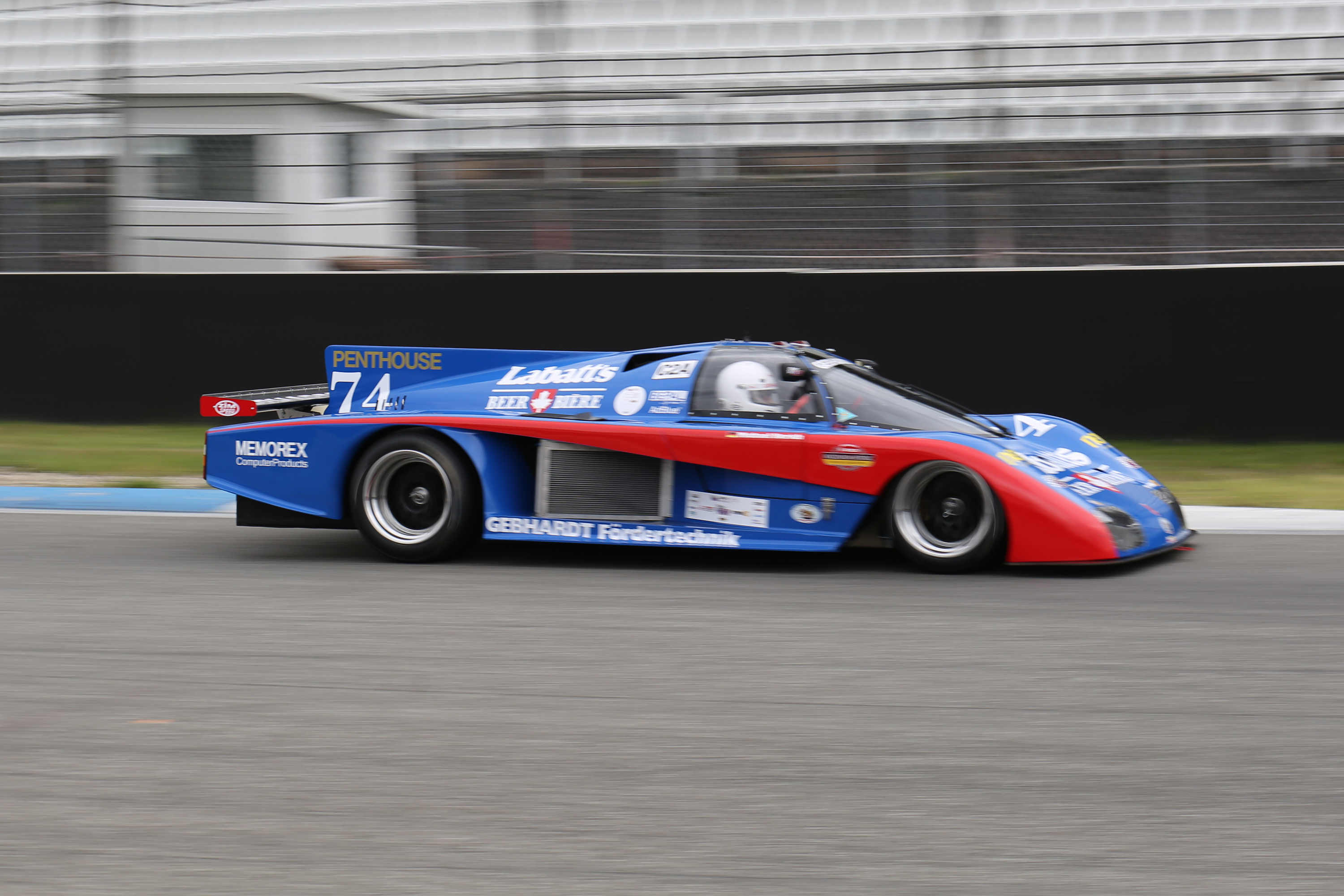
Gebhardt JC853 – works entry

The Ecurie Ecosse team brought two cars to Le Mans. The new C286 was built on a spare chassis, and now sported a 3-litre Rover V6 engine, as used in the MG Metro rally-car. It could put out 380 bhp. Once again, team-drivers Ray Mallock, David Leslie and Mike Wilds had the car. The team also entered their last season's car, the C285 with its 3.3-litre Cosworth DFL, for three American pay-drivers.

Gebhardt Motorsport had had a positive 1985 season and the new JC853 model stepped up fitting the Cosworth DFL, race-tuned by Heini Mader. The team had started the season with a class-win at the Monza "sprint-race", by Frank Jelinski and Stanley Dickens. Two cars were entered for Le Mans but when Jelinski was seconded to the Brun Motorsport team, only the one car arrived – to be driven by Dickens with Pierre de Thoisy and Jean-François Yvon. ADA Engineering returned with their 2-year old JC843, shedding 20 kg and improved suspension. It again had its Cosworth DFL prepared by John Nicholson. This year owner-driver, Ian Harrower, teamed up with Tom Dodd-Noble and Evan Clements.

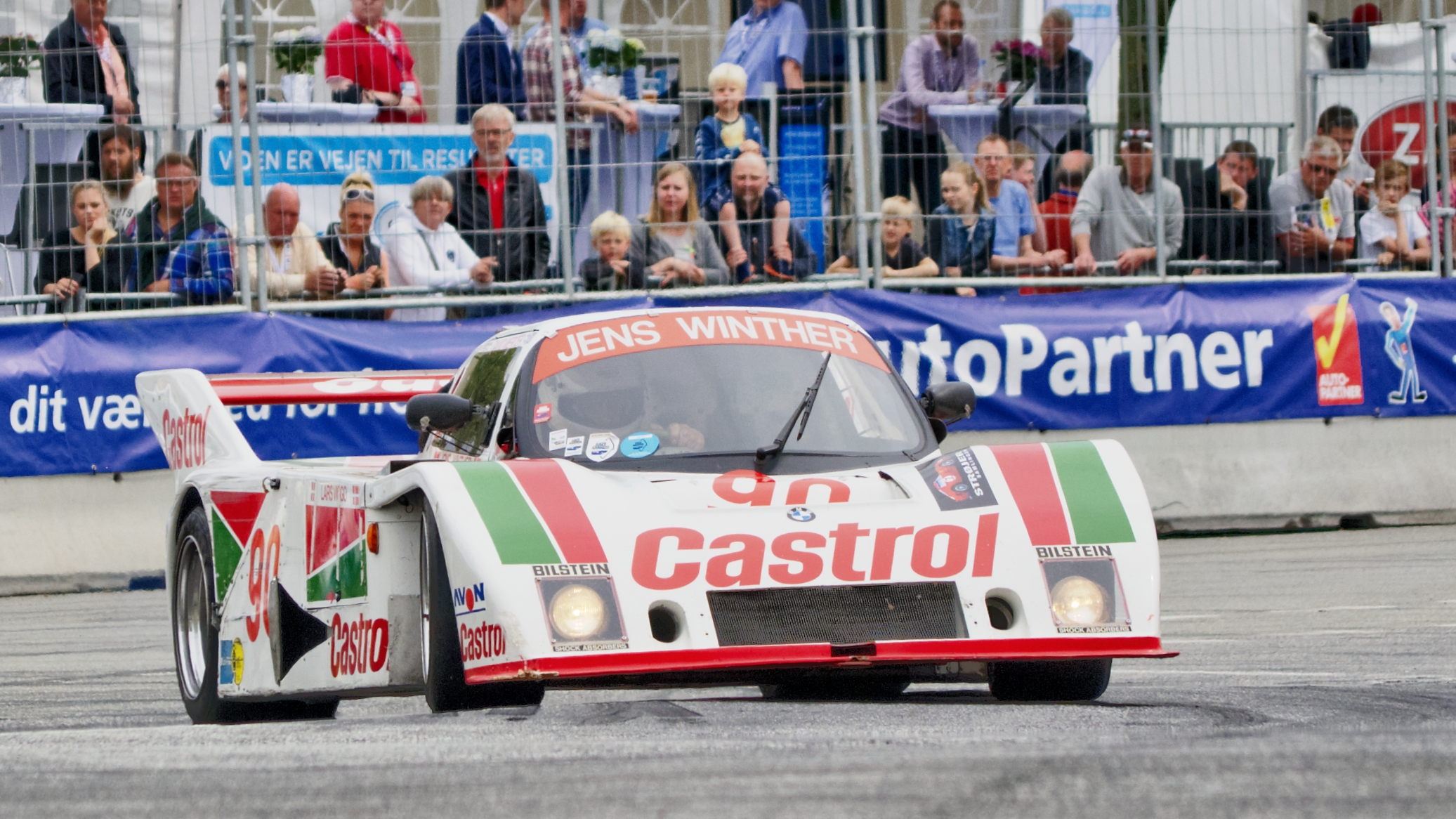
URD C83 of privateer Jens Winther

As the Alba works team, Carlo Facetti's Carma FF team had migrated to compete in the IMSA Lights season with the new Alba-Ferrari AR6. So, the only entrant this year was Luigi Taverna's Cosworth-powered AR3. This was the car run the previous year by Grifo Autoracing team, who were embarking on building their own car. After several successful seasons in Group B racing a BMW M1, Jens Winther had moved up to the C2 class with the German URD, fitted with the same BMW M88 engine. Last year's race had ended in retirement, but results through the season had been promising. Winther brought the car back again, with his regular drivers David Mercer and Lars-Viggo Jensen. In 1983, the Earl of Arundel had commissioned a C2 car from Anson Cars. After a brief few races, the project was shelved. This year, John Bartlett and Robin Donovan bought the car, modified it and rebadged it as the Bardon DB1. With the Cosworth DFL it was limited to 250 kp/h (160 mph). Donovan got Richard Jones and Nick Adams as co-drivers.

The British Argo Racing Cars had made the transition from single-seater cars to sports-cars, with considerable success in the IMSA series. Their first customer, Jim Downing won the inaugural Camel Lights championships in 1985 with the Mazda-powered Argo JM16. The successor JM19 model had several engine options. Norwegian Martin Schanche (a four-time European Rallycross champion) entered his JM19 with a Zakspeed 1720cc engine with a Garrett-turbocharger. With 550 bhp, the cars were often the fastest on the tracks. Gentleman-drivers Louis Descartes and Jacques Heuclin carried on working on their ALD. With the 02 version, they moved the cockpit forward to accommodate a 100-litre fuel cell. The improvements made it faster, now getting up to 290 kp/h (180 mph) and was able lap 20 seconds faster this year. Lucien Roussiaud returned with his 5-year old Rondeau M379C, again prepared by Heini Mader.

=== Group B and GTX ===
Porsche had been working on a four-wheel drive Group B car since 1983. This became the Porsche 959 "supercar", and the company wanted to produce the requisite 200 cars for homologation and customer sale. However, by 1986, the FIA had tweaked the regulations for rallying and the customer-car project was cancelled. A works racing-car version was continued with, as the Porsche 961. It would be the first 4-wheel drive car to race at Le Mans since the war. As an interesting technical exercise and without the necessary production numbers, it was put in the GTX class as its sole entry. The car was equipped with a 2847cc twin-turbo engine, making about 640 bhp and getting up to 330 kp/h (205 mph). Like the 956 and 962, it had mixed-cooling with air-cooled block and water-cooled heads. The four-wheel drive was set up to put more power on the back wheels, and composite bodyshell kept the overall weight down near the 1150 kg minimum for Group B. The drivers would be rally-driver René Metge and veteran Claude Ballot-Léna (in his 22nd consecutive Le Mans start). The Porsche 959 had a 1-2 result in this year's Paris - Dakar Rally, with Metge winning from Jacky Ickx. There was but a single entry in Group B GT, which would turn out to be the final appearance of the BMW M1. Michael Krankenberg's MK Motorsport engaged Helmut Gall (who had taken the class victory in the past two Le Mans) to prepare and race the car, alongside Jean-Paul Libert and Pascal Witmeur.

== Practice and Qualifying ==
Once again, the top Porsches were fitted with special 3-litre turbo engines for qualifying – not an option for the normally-aspirated Jaguar team. The variable weather made the circuit very crowded when conditions improved, which in turn made it difficult for the top cars to get clear laps to set their best time. It was Jochen Mass who got the best opportunity, at dusk on the first day, setting a pole time of 3:15.99, over a second slower than the previous year. Stuck put the team car beside him on the front row. The Joest and Brun Porsches (Ludwig and Boutsen respectively) were next with the best Jaguar (Warwick) in fifth (3:21.6). Ludwig had set the top speed on the Hunaudières Straight, clocking 375 kp/h (232 mph).

This year, the Saubers were suffering from too much downforce, and they could go no faster than clocking 330 kp/h (205 mph). The best of their cars was Christian Danner qualifying 9th (3:26.7), with de Cadenet putting the Cougar alongside it. The new aerodynamics dropped its top speed by 330 kp/h but improved its lap-time by 11 seconds from last year. This was a good recovery after Raphanel had crashed in the Porsche Curves on the first day. Many of the privateer Porsches had instability problems at high speed. After doing only two laps, Juan Fernandez in the second Fitzpatrick car, found the circuit too daunting and ceded his place to South African George Fouché. Another demoted driver was Philippe Dermagne, in the Cosmik March. Having gone off at Indianapolis on his first lap of the circuit, ripping off the oil-cooler, he then proceeded to return to the pits driving on the racing line, dropping oil all along the circuit. He was dismissed, and his seat taken by Neil Crang. Crang had only managed a handful of laps in the C1 Tiga, when the engine abruptly failed. Only replaced by Friday, there was no time to left for qualifying and the car was excluded by the ACO.

The Japanese cars were not even remotely on the pace of the other C1 cars. The GTP Mazdas were 25th and 29th. The two Dome-Toyotas were down in 30th (3:45.3) and 40th. Qualifying for the Nissan team was particularly shambolic, with team manager Greene at loggerheads with his lead drivers. Trying to get them to restrict the turbo-boost, he even resorted to removing the dashboard knobs, only for Hoshino and Hasemi to get the mechanics to wind up the turbos manually. That blew the engines on both cars, losing valuable qualifying time. Greene gave the management an ultimatum that he would walk out if his plan was not listened to. A grumpy James Weaver, sidelined by the team, qualified the older car a lowly 33rd, while the new R86V was 24th (3:41.5) – with a top speed fully 70 kp/h (45 mph) slower than the Porsches and Jaguars.

In the C2 class, despite three clutch failures, the new Spice-Fiero set the fastest time by quite a margin: 3:40.4 to be 23rd on the grid. The private Rondeau did well to qualify second, over four seconds behind (3:43.7), just ahead of the works Gebhardt (28th). The GTX Porsche 961 was 26th while the Group B BMW was the final car on the grid, 50th with a 4:08.7.

== Race ==
=== Start ===
The race start reverted to 4pm and this year the honorary starter was Sir John Egan, chairman of Jaguar Cars. At the start, both Ludwig and Boutsen tried to overtake the Rothmans Porsches and they raced four-wide down the main straight towards the Dunlop Curve. By the time they were at the Mulsanne corner, Ludwig and Warwick (in the Jaguar) were at the front. However, within three laps, the two works Porsches were up to speed and moved up to challenge the Joest car for the lead. An early casualty was Raphanel in the Cougar, losing a door on the first lap. It cost 20 minutes in the pits to replace, only for it to happen again after only 3 laps back on the track. With no more doors left, the crew spent four hours fashioning a substitute out of a sheet of aluminium. Another was Pescarolo in his Sauber, who stopped on the back straight. Debris had fallen off the sister-car he was following and holed the oil cooler. It took over an hour before he could limp back to the pits for repairs. Worse, just a few laps later, the other Sauber pitted with handling problems. This continued into the second hour, after the first pit-stops with the co-drivers taking up the pursuit. After that first hour, there were nine cars on the lead lap; after two, it was down to five: the Joest car was still less than 30 seconds ahead of two of the works Porsches, with the two Jaguars of Warwick/Cheever/Schlesser and Brancatelli/Percy/Hahne not far behind, looking solid. A lap down were the third works cars, the Larrauri and Boutsen Brun cars, and the Gartner/van der Merwe Kremer car in 10th. After initially leading in C2, the Spice-Fiero had slipped back when its clutch problems resurfaced. The class was now being led by Dickens' Gebhardt. They held the lead until 8pm when a collision with a C1 car forced a half-hour in the pits to repair the suspension, only to crash at the Ford Chicane soon after returning to the race. The ADA Gebhardt had a tyre blowout at Indianapolis that ripped up the rear bodywork, and required a new wing to be improvised and riveted into place. The leaders kept up their pace going into dusk, while the field behind had their issues. The first leader change was after six hours, as the Joest car slipped to third behind the Rothmans cars. Both works teams lost a car in the early hours. The experimental Porsche broke its gearbox after Olson had a big moment at Indianapolis while running 7th. The Jaguar of Hans Heyer stopped at Indianapolis, apparently out of fuel. He contrived to get back to the pits, swerving back and forth to pick up any remaining fuel, where it was found the fuel pump had failed. Schuppan, now at a loose end, was transferred to Mass' Porsche, and likewise Haywood moved to the Brancatelli car (that had inherited the sister car's fifth place) to help with the driving. Miller stopped the American Joest car at Mulsanne, also apparently out of fuel. Pushed behind the walls, it re-appeared five minutes later when he was able to switch it over to the reserve tank and get back to the pits. The time lost dropped them from tenth to 21st. The 7th hour was tough on the Brun team, with the team-owner at the wheel when his car lost a valve, while running 11th; and then Alain Ferté lost control of his at the Ford Chicane, slamming into the wall.

=== Night ===
The initial phase of the race had been an intriguing tactical match between the two Porsche teams, with the advantage narrowly in the Joest favour with its slightly better fuel economy. A fairly dismal Le Mans ended for Sauber at 11pm. The 'Pesca'/Danner/Quester was steadily working back up the field after their early delay, but a broken gearbox put them out. The other car was already out with engine issues. Around midnight, the remaining Brun car was delayed with suspension repairs. At 1.20am, Win Percy came in early in his stint to refuel. The pit crewman refuelling fell asleep at his job, and there was a sudden crack as the over-pressurised fuel cell buckled the bodyshell. Walkinshaw yelled at his driver to start up and drive out. Half an hour later, Percy had a big moment after Arnage when a driveshaft failed on the Jaguar at speed. Getting the car under control, he parked out on the circuit. It was only later that Percy was told the 100-litre fuel-cell had been overfilled to about 128 litres, making the car a dangerous bomb in a crowded pit-lane. Meanwhile, Bell and Ludwig had been trading fastest lap-times back and forth through the night, usually barely seconds apart, and the Rothmans Porsche finally got to the lead at 2am. Then soon after 3am, Jochen Mass, running third, wrote off his car when he came through the Porsche Curves and spun on spilt oil, to find the class-leading Ecosse of Mike Wilds in the middle of the road having just done the same thing. With suspension damage and three punctures, Mass could go no further. The nose of the Ecosse was sliced off but Wilds (having whipped his legs up out the way just in time) was able to get back to the pits. By excellent pitwork, the car was repaired within 50 minutes. Such was their lead, the Ecosse rejoined the race still two laps ahead of their nearest challenger and only dropping one place overall, down to 14th.

Just a short while later, a terrible accident happened on the Hunaudières Straight. The Kremer 962 had been as high as 7th before losing half an hour with suspension repairs just before midnight. Jo Gartner was pushing back up through the field and up to eighth when it suffered a transmission failure. The rear wheels immediately locked and the car hit the Armco at 260 kp/h. Breaking through, it hit a telephone pole and went up into the trees. Rebounding through the air across the track, it spread its debris over 200 metres before ending up on the guardrail opposite, upside-down and on fire. Gartner was killed instantly, and the devastated Kremer team withdrew their other car. The field was put behind the pace cars for two and a half hours while the safety barriers were repaired. However, along with a light drizzle cooling the night, the extended change of pace overheated the engine of Ludwig's leading Porsche. The motor ran its bearings and its race was run. This handed the lead to the Bell/Stuck/Holbert Porsche, with an unassailable nine-lap lead on the rest of the field and fuel consumption no longer an issue. In a mammoth quadruple-stint, Larrauri had driven through the night bringing the Brun Porsche back up to fourth, which became second with the demise of the cars ahead of him. After its fuel delay earlier in the race, the Joest 956 had run very reliably and was now in fifth.

=== Morning ===
An overcast day dawned reflecting the sombre mood of the paddock. Half the field had now retired. The stuffing had been knocked out of the race, and there was little notable activity on the racetrack. At 6am, the works car had done 210 laps, with the Brun car and the remaining Jaguar both nine laps back. The JFR Porsche of Velez/de Villota/Fouché was fourth (198) with the American Joest car a lap back. The Schuster privateer 936J had kept out of trouble, doing very well in 6th (192) ahead of the Obermeier and second JFR Porsches. The Elgh/Gabbiani/Suzuki Dome had been progressively moving up the field and was now 9th, with the Porsche 961 charging along in 10th. The Ecosse was 12th and still leading in C2, but at 6.30am, Leslie had a tyre explode coming out of the Mulsanne kink, doing a lot of chassis damage. He stopped at Mulsanne and found the radiator had been knocked off its frame. Tying it back with some string and refilling it with a number of trips with a drinks-bottle to a watertank he eventually made it back to the pits. But the team was then disqualified for filling liquids outside the pit area. Cheever took over second place at 7am in his Jaguar. Then at 8.30, in a repeat of the earlier event, Schlesser had the right-rear tyre go as he, in turn, went through the Mulsanne kink. While he brought the car under control and got back to the pits, the suspension was ruined and the car retired.

By following Greene's tight regimen, the Nissan of Wada/Hasemi/Weaver had got up to the top-10 soon after 9am. However, at the next pit-stop, Wada could not re-fire the engine and an hour was lost fixing the electrics. Either side of noon, another 90 minutes was spent repairing the ignition system. In a similar story, the remaining Dome had got up to 7th by 9am but then lost an hour, and four places, fixing a holed radiator.

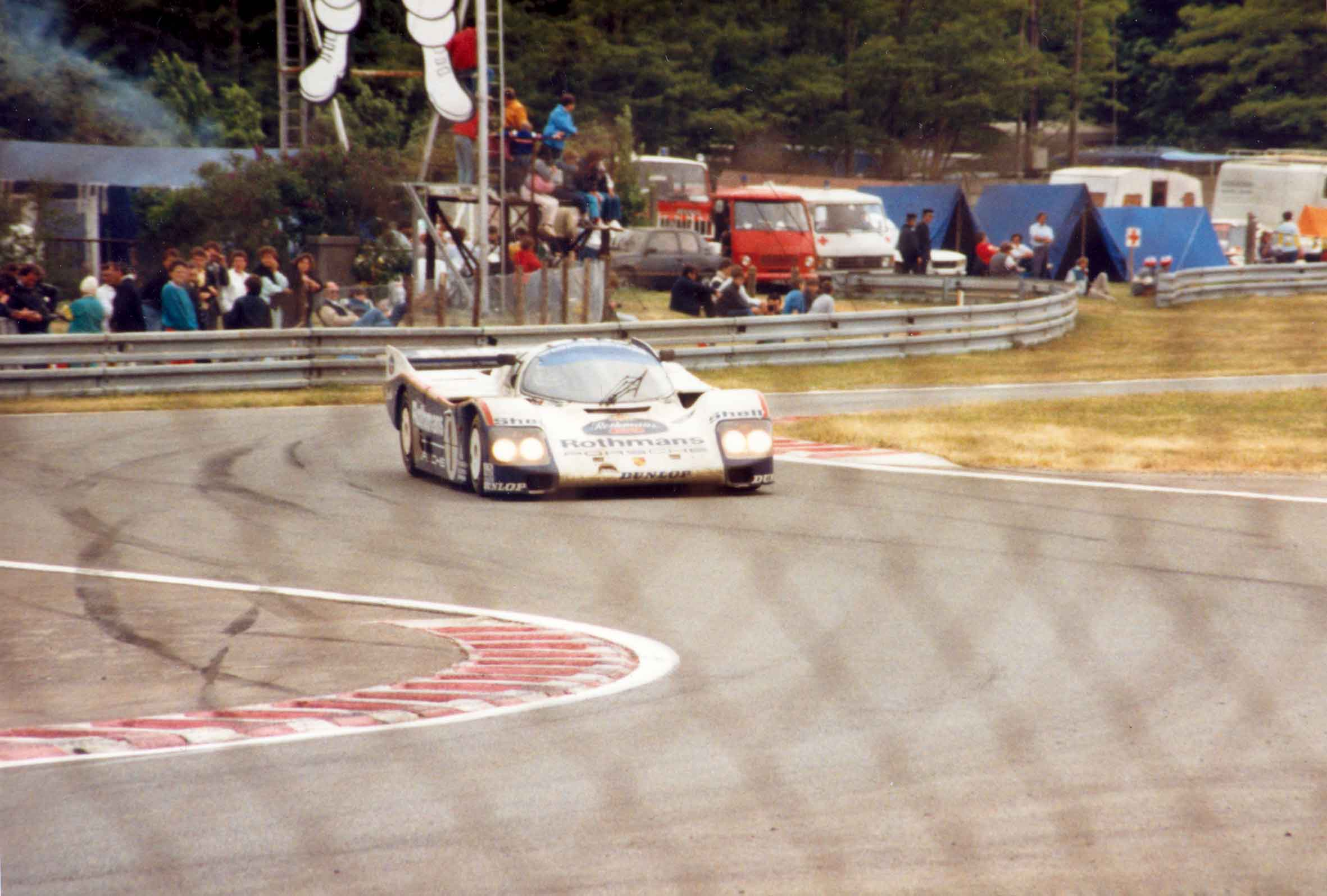
Derek Bell at the Ford chicane

=== Finish and post-race ===
The race drifted towards its conclusion through the afternoon. The only battle for position was between the Obermeier Porsche and the Schuster 936 for fifth place, swapping positions several times. Bell, Stuck and Holbert brought the works Porsche home to win by a comfortable margin. The Brun 962 took second place, eight laps back with the Joest Porsche third, a further five laps behind.

Fourth was the John Fitzpatrick's "old workhorse". The 956B had finished 3rd in 1984 and 4th in 1985. Spaniards Emilio de Villota and Fermín Velez, along with substitute George Fouché, had a trouble-free run. Their team-mates in the 962 copped all the bad luck, with delays from faulty lights, water leaks, a loose door and run-ins with backmarkers. They were thankful to make it to tenth. It was a similar story for the Richard Lloyd car, that ground its way up to an eventual 9th place after running last within the first half-hour of the race. It was a better story for the small Obermeier team and privateer Ernst Schuster, their cars running like clockwork to keep their 5th and 6th places, albeit over 20 laps behind the winner.

Among all the C1 Porsches in the top-10 was the 4WD Porsche 961, which finished 7th after a fairly untroubled run. The privateer Gebhardt of ADA Engineering finished 8th, winning the C2 class. A surprise second-in-class was the URD of Jens Winther. The Spice-Fiero had spent two and a half hours getting its clutch replaced early in the night. Despite that, they carried on and were the last classified finisher, and good enough to beat the lead Porsche to take the Index of Thermal Efficiency. Sole survivor in the GTP class was the Richard Cleare Racing March. It had been running 21st at midnight when 90 minutes was spent repairing the suspension. However, after that, it ran reliably and finished 14th. They were under no class pressure after the Mazdas were out before half-time, both stopping on track with broken transmission. Nissan came home 16th after its morning trials and, despite the lead car failing before nightfall, the management team were delighted confirming their commitment to sports-car racing. Not so were their compatriots at Dome – Gabbiani was still running 11th when the turbo caught fire on the last lap. He stopped at a marshals' station and got the fire put out, but by the time he limped around to the finish line time had lapsed and they car was not classified. The single entry in Group B was the BMW M1 of MK Motorsport. It would be the last M1 to race at Le Mans, and set a lap record for the class. The car ran smoothly through the race, getting into the top-20 by half-time. However, with 90minutes to go Witmeur brought it into the pits with the gearbox almost locked solid. With 20 minutes left, Libert took the ailing BMW out, crawling around in second gear, trying to get to the finish. With a final lap too slow though, the car was not classified.

For Bell, it was his fourth victory and Holbert's second. Together, Bell & Holbert had won both the premier 24-hour sports-car races (Daytona and Le Mans) in the same year, the first to do so. It was mixed emotions for Stuck, who had driven with Gartner to win the Sebring 12 Hours earlier in the year. Porsche took their sixth consecutive victory. Eight of the Porsches in the C1 class finished, and all of them in the top-10.

The season proved to be an interesting one with seven different winners in the nine races. Lancia officially withdrew from motor-racing just before the next event, after the death of their driver, Giacomo Maggi, while testing. This followed the recent deaths of Henri Toivonen and co-driver Sergio Cresto in a Group B Lancia at the Tour de Corse rally a month earlier. Brun Motorsport achieved their great ambition, when their consistency won them the inaugural Teams' Championship. With the Joest team coming second, the works teams of Porsche and Jaguar were beaten back to third equal. Kremer Racing was devastated by the loss of Gartner and had considered shutting up. Instead, however, they set about redesigning the 962 tub to what they considered a safer form.

Bell and Stuck did win a consecutive Drivers' Championship though. In C2, the Ecurie Ecosse won the Teams' Championship, while Spice and Bellm took out the C2 Drivers' title. However, the FIA's fixation with Formula 1 and the lack of rules stability was concerning the manufacturers and cracks in the series were starting to appear.

== Official results ==
=== Finishers ===
Results taken from Quentin Spurring's book, officially licensed by the ACO
Class Winners are in Bold text.

Pos	Class	No.	Team	Drivers	Chassis	Engine	Tyre	Laps
1	**Gr.C1**	**1**	**(West Germany) Rothmans Porsche**	**(United Kingdom) Derek Bell** **(West Germany) Hans-Joachim Stuck** **(United States) Al Holbert**	Porsche 962C	Porsche 935/76 2.6L F6 twin turbo	D	368
2	Gr.C1	17	(Switzerland) Brun Motorsport	(Argentina) Oscar Larrauri (Spain) Jesús Pareja (France) Joël Gouhier	Porsche 962C	Porsche 935/76 2.6L F6 twin turbo	MI	360
3	Gr.C1	8	(West Germany) Joest Racing	(United States) George Follmer (United States) John Morton (United States) Kenper Miller	Porsche 956B	Porsche 935/79 2.6L F6 twin turbo	G	355
4	Gr.C1	33	(United Kingdom) John Fitzpatrick Racing (Spain) Danone Porsche España	(Spain) Emilio de Villota (Spain) Fermín Velez (South Africa) George Fouché	Porsche 956B	Porsche 935/79 2.6L F6 twin turbo	G	349
5	Gr.C1	9	(West Germany) Obermaier Racing	(West Germany) Jürgen Lässig (United Kingdom) Dudley Wood (Italy) Fulvio Ballabio	Porsche 956	Porsche 935/79 2.6L F6 twin turbo	G	345
6	Gr.C1	63	(West Germany) E. Schuster (private entrant)	(West Germany) Ernst Schuster (West Germany) Siegfried Brunn (West Germany) Rudi Seher	Porsche 936C	Porsche Type-962/71 2.7L F6 twin turbo	D	344
7	**IMSA**; **GTX**	**180**	**(West Germany) Porsche AG**	**(France) René Metge** **(France) Claude Ballot-Léna**	Porsche 961	Porsche Type-935/82 2.9L F6 twin turbo	D	321
8	**Gr.C2**	**75**	**(United Kingdom) ADA Engineering**	**(United Kingdom) Ian Harrower** **(United Kingdom) Evan Clements** **(United Kingdom) Tom Dodd-Noble**	Gebhardt JC843	Cosworth DFL 3.3L V8	A	318
9	Gr.C1	14	(United Kingdom) Richard Lloyd Racing (United Kingdom) Liqui Moly Equipe	(Italy) Mauro Baldi (United States) Price Cobb (United States) Rob Dyson	Porsche 956 GTi	Porsche 935/79 2.6L F6 twin turbo	G	318
10	Gr.C1	55	(United Kingdom) John Fitzpatrick Racing	(France) Philippe Alliot (France) Michel Trollé (Spain) Paco Romero	Porsche 962C	Porsche 935/76 2.6L F6 twin turbo	G	312
11	Gr.C2	90	Jens Winther Denmark (private entrant)	(Denmark) Jens Winther (United Kingdom) David Mercer (Denmark) Lars Viggo Jensen	URD C83	BMW M88 3.5L S6	A	310
12	Gr.C2	100	(France) WM Secateva	(France) Roger Dorchy (Switzerland) Claude Haldi (France) Pascal Pessiot	WM P85	Peugeot PRV ZNS4 2.7L; V6 twin-turbo	MI	301
13	Gr.C1	47	(France) Graff Racing (France) J.-P. Grand (private entrant)	(France) Jean-Philippe Grand (France) Jacques Goudchaux (France) Marc Menant	Rondeau M482	Cosworth DFL 3.3 L V8	G	299
14	**IMSA**; **GTP**	**21**	(United Kingdom) Richard Cleare Racing (private entrant)	(United Kingdom) Richard Cleare (France) Lionel Robert (United States) Jack Newsum	March 85G	Porsche Type-962/70 2.9L F6 turbo	G	299
15	Gr.C2	78	(United Kingdom) Ecurie Ecosse	(United States) Les Delano (United States) John Hotchkis (United States) Andy Petery	Ecosse C285	Cosworth DFL 3.3 L V8	A	293
16	Gr.C1	32	(Japan) NISMO	(Japan) Takao Wada (Japan) Masahiro Hasemi (United Kingdom) James Weaver	Nissan R85V	Nissan VG30ET 3.0L V6 twin turbo	D	285
17	Gr.C2	102	(France) Écurie Blanchet Locatop (France) L. Rossiaud (private entrant)	(France) Lucien Rossiaud (France) Bruno Sotty (France) Noël del Bello	Rondeau M379C	Cosworth DFV 3.0L V8	A	278
18	Gr.C1	13	(France) Courage Compétition (France) Compagnie Primagaz	(France) Yves Courage (United Kingdom) Alain de Cadenet (France) Pierre-Henri Raphanel	Cougar C12	Porsche 935/76 2.6L F6 twin turbo	MI	267
19	Gr.C2	70	(United Kingdom) Spice Engineering	(United Kingdom) Gordon Spice (United Kingdom) Ray Bellm (Belgium) Jean-Michel Martin	Spice-Fiero SE86C	Cosworth DFL 3.3 L V8	A	258
N/C*	Gr.C1	38	(Japan) Dome Company	(Sweden) Eje Elgh (Italy) Beppe Gabbiani (Japan) Toshio Suzuki	Dome 86C-L	Toyota 4T-GT 2.1L S4 turbo	D	295
N/C*	Gr.B	111	(West Germany) MK-Motorsport (private entrant)	(West Germany) Michael Krankenberg (Belgium) Pascal Witmeur (Belgium) Jean-Paul Libert	BMW M1	BMW M88 3.5L S6	D	265
N/C**	Gr.C2	72	(United Kingdom) John Bartlett Racing (private entrant)	(United Kingdom) Robin Donovan (United Kingdom) Richard Jones (United Kingdom) Nick Adams	Bardon DB1	Cosworth DFL 3.3 L V8	A	211
N/C**	Gr.C2	95	(France) R. Bassaler (private entrant)	(France) Roland Bassaler (France) Dominique Lacaud (France) Yvon Tapy	Sauber SHS C6	BMW M88 3.5L S6	A	201

- Note *: Not Classified as their last lap was too slow to qualify
- Note **: Not Classified because did not cover sufficient distance (70% of the winner) by the race's end.

=== Did not finish ===
Pos	Class	No	Team	Drivers	Chassis	Engine	Tyre	Laps	Reason
DNF	Gr.C1	51	(United Kingdom) Silk Cut Jaguar (United Kingdom) Tom Walkinshaw Racing	(United Kingdom) Derek Warwick (United States) Eddie Cheever (France) Jean-Louis Schlesser	Jaguar XJR-6	Jaguar 6.0L V12	D	239	Suspension (17hr)
DNF	Gr.C1	7	(West Germany) Joest Racing	(West Germany) Klaus Ludwig (Italy) Paolo Barilla (West Germany) "John Winter" (Louis Krages)	Porsche 956B	Porsche 935/79 2.6L F6 twin turbo	G	196	Engine (13hr)
DSQ	Gr.C2	79	(United Kingdom) Ecurie Ecosse	(United Kingdom) David Leslie (United Kingdom) Mike Wilds (United Kingdom) Ray Mallock	Ecosse C286	Austin-Rover V64V 3.0L V6	A	181	Adding fluids outside pits (17hr)
DNF	Gr.C1	2	(West Germany) Rothmans Porsche	(West Germany) Jochen Mass (France) Bob Wollek (Australia) Vern Schuppan	Porsche 962C	Porsche 935/76 2.6L F6 twin turbo	D	180	Accident (12hr)
DNF	Gr.C1	10	(West Germany) Kremer Racing	(South Africa) Sarel van der Merwe (Austria) Jo Gartner (Japan) Kunimitsu Takahashi	Porsche 962C	Porsche 935/76 2.6L F6 twin turbo	Y	169	Fatal accident (Gartner driving) (12hr)
DSQ	Gr.C1	66	(United Kingdom) Cosmik Racing Promotions	(Greece) Costas Los (France) Raymond Touroul (Australia) Neil Crang	March 84G	Porsche 935/76 2.6L F6 twin turbo	A	169	Outside assistance (16hr)
DNF	Gr.C1	12	(West Germany) Kremer Racing	(France) Pierre Yver (France) Hubert Striebig (Morocco) Max Cohen-Olivar	Porsche 956	Porsche 935/79 2.6L F6 twin turbo	Y	160	Withdrawn after fatal accident of No. 10 car entered by team. (13hr)
DNF	Gr.C1	53	(United Kingdom) Silk Cut Jaguar (United Kingdom) Tom Walkinshaw Racing	(Italy) Gianfranco Brancatelli (United Kingdom) Win Percy (United States) Hurley Haywood	Jaguar XJR-6	Jaguar 6.0L V12	D	154	Transmission (11hr)
DNF	IMSA; GTP	170	(Japan) Mazdaspeed	(Belgium) Pierre Dieudonné (Republic of Ireland) David Kennedy (Republic of Ireland) Mark Galvin	Mazda 757	Mazda 13G 1962cc triple-rotary	D	137	Gearbox (11hr)
DNF	Gr.C1	41	(France) WM Secateva	(France) Jean-Daniel Raulet (France) Michel Pignard (France) François Migault	WM P85	Peugeot PRV ZNS4 2.8L; V6 twin-turbo	MI	132	Engine (12hr)
DNF	Gr.C2	99	(United Kingdom) Roy Baker Racing Tiga	(United Kingdom) John Sheldon (Denmark) Thorkild Thyrring (United States) Nick Nicholson	Tiga GC286	Cosworth BDT 1700cc S4 turbo	A	125	Engine (22hr)
DNF	Gr.C1	45	(France) P. Oudet (private entrant)	(France) Patrick Oudet (France) Jean-Claude Justice	Rondeau M382	Cosworth DFL 3.3 L V8	D	110	Engine (9hr)
DNF	Gr.C1	36	(Japan) TOM'S Team	(Japan) Satoru Nakajima (United Kingdom) Geoff Lees (Japan) Masanori Sekiya	Dome RC86C-L	Toyota 4T-GT 2.1L S4 turbo	B	105	Engine (8hr)
DNF	Gr.C2	97	(United Kingdom) Ray Baker Racing Tiga	(United States) Tom Frank (United Kingdom) Valentino Musetti (United States) Mike Allison	Tiga GC285	Cosworth BDT 1778cc S4 turbo	A	95	Engine (15hr)
DNF	Gr.C1	19	(Switzerland) Brun Motorsport	(Belgium) Thierry Boutsen (Belgium) Didier Theys (France) Alain Ferté	Porsche 956	Porsche 935/79 2.6L F6 twin turbo	MI	89	Accident (7hr)
DNF	Gr.C1	62	(Switzerland) Kouros Racing	(France) Henri Pescarolo (Germany) Christian Danner (Austria) Dieter Quester	Sauber C8	Mercedes-Benz M117; 5.0L V8 twin turbo	G	86	Gearbox (8hr)
DNF	Gr.C1	18	(Switzerland) Brun Motorsport	(Switzerland) Walter Brun (Italy) Massimo Sigala (West Germany) Frank Jelinski	Porsche 962C	Porsche 935/76 2.6L F6 twin turbo	MI	75	Engine (7hr)
DNF	Gr.C2	83	(Italy) Luigi Taverna; Techno Racing (private entrant)	(Italy) Luigi Taverna (Italy) Toni Palma (Switzerland) Marco Vanoli	Alba AR3	Cosworth DFL 3.3 L V8	A	74	Engine (9hr)
DNF	Gr.C2	74	(West Germany) Gebhardt Motorsport	(Sweden) Stanley Dickens (France) Pierre de Thoisy (France) Jean-François Yvon	Gebhardt JC853	Cosworth DFL 3.3 L V8	A	68	Accident (7hr)
DNF	Gr.C1	23	(Japan) NISMO	(Japan) Kazuyoshi Hoshino (Japan) Keiji Matsumoto (Japan) Aguri Suzuki	Nissan R86V	Nissan VG30ET 3.0L V6 twin turbo	B	64	Engine (6hr)
DNF	Gr.C1	61	(Switzerland) Kouros Racing	(Denmark) John Nielsen (New Zealand) Mike Thackwell	Sauber C8	Mercedes-Benz M117; 5.0L V8 twin turbo	G	61	Engine (6hr)
DNF	IMSA; GTP	171	(Japan) Mazdaspeed	(Japan) Yojiro Terada (Japan) Takashi Yorino (Japan) Yoshimi Katayama	Mazda 757	Mazda 13G 1962cc triple-rotary	D	59	Transmission (6hr)
DNF	Gr.C1	52	(United Kingdom) Silk Cut Jaguar (United Kingdom) Tom Walkinshaw Racing	(United Kingdom) Brian Redman (West Germany) Hans Heyer (United States) Hurley Haywood	Jaguar XJR-6	Jaguar 6.0L V12	D	53	Fuel pressure (5hr)
DNF	Gr.C1	3	(West Germany) Rothmans Porsche	(Australia) Vern Schuppan (United States) Drake Olson	Porsche 962C	Porsche 935/76 2.6L F6 twin turbo	D	41	Gearbox (4hr)
DNF	Gr.C2	92	(France) Automobiles; Louis Descartes (private entrant)	(France) Louis Descartes (France) Jacques Heuclin	ALD 02	BMW M88 3.5L S6	A	41	Accident (6hr)
DNF	Gr.C2	98	(United Kingdom) Ray Baker Racing Tiga	(United Kingdom) David Andrews (Australia) Mike Hall (United Kingdom) Duncan Bain	Tiga GC286	Cosworth BDT 1700cc S4 turbo	A	1	Engine (2hr)
DNF	Gr.C2	89	(Norway) Schanche Racing (private entrant)	(Norway) Martin Schanche (Republic of Ireland) Martin Birrane (Norway) Torgye Kleppe	Argo JM19	Zakspeed 1720cc S4 turbo	G	1	Transmission (2hr)

=== Did not start ===
Pos	Class	No	Team	Drivers	Chassis	Engine	Tyre	Reason
DNQ	Gr.C1	20	(United Kingdom) Tiga Team	(United Kingdom) Tim Lee-Davey (Australia) Neil Crang (Australia) John Gimbel	Tiga GC86	Cosworth DFL 3.3 L V8 turbo	D	Engine
DNQ	Gr.C2	106	(Sweden) Bo Strandell Engineering (private entrant)	(Sweden) Kenneth Leim (Sweden) Bo Hellberg (West Germany) Peter Fritsch	Strandell C85	Porsche Type-934 3.0L F6 turbo	A	Fuel pressure
DNA	Gr.C1	11	(West Germany) Kremer Racing	(South Africa) Sarel van der Merwe (Austria) Jo Gartner (France) Philippe Alliot	Porsche 956	Porsche 935/79 2.6L F6 twin turbo	Y	Did not arrive
DNA	Gr.C1	22	(United Kingdom) Portman Lamborghini	(Italy) Mauro Baldi (United Kingdom) Tiff Needell	Tiga-Lamborghini Countach QVX	Lamborghini 5.7L V12	G	Did not arrive
DNA	Gr.C1	46	(France) Bussi Racing (private entrant)	(France) Christian Bussi	Rondeau M482	Cosworth DFL 3.3 L V8		Did not arrive
DNA	Gr.C1	49	(France) X Racing (private entrant)	(France) Raymond Touroul (France) Philippe Dermagne (France) Thierry Perrier	Rondeau M382	Cosworth DFL 3.3L V8		Did not arrive
DNA	Gr.C1		(Italy) Martini Racing	(France) Henri Pescarolo (Italy) Mauro Baldi	Lancia LC2-85	Ferrari 308C 3.0L V8 twin turbo	MI	Withdrawn
DNA	Gr.C1		(Italy) Martini Racing	(France) Bob Wollek (Italy) Alessandro Nannini	Lancia LC2-85	Ferrari 308C 3.0L V8 twin turbo	MI	Withdrawn
DNA	Gr.C2	96	(France) R. Touroul (private entrant)	(France) Raymond Touroul (France) Philippe Dermagne (France) Thierry Perrier	GKW 862 SP	Porsche Type-962 3.0L F6 twin turbo		Did not arrive
DNF	Gr.C2	73	(West Germany) Gebhardt Motorsport	(West Germany) Frank Jelinski	Gebhardt JC853	Cosworth DFL 3.3 L V8	A	Did not arrive
DNA	Gr.C2	80	(Italy) Carma FF	(Italy) Martino Finotto (Italy) Carlo Facetti	Alba AR6	Carma FF 1915cc S4 turbo		Did not arrive
DNA	Gr.C2	82	(Italy) Grifo Autoracing	(Italy) Pasquale Barberio (Italy) Paolo Giangrossi	Grifo F862C	Cosworth DFL 3.3L V8		Did not arrive
DNA	Gr.C2	91	(United Kingdom) PC Automotive	(United Kingdom) Richard Piper (United Kingdom) David Brodie	Royale RP40	Mitsubishi Starion 1999cc S4 turbo		Did not arrive
DNA	Gr.C2	93	(France) M.-G. Baudoin	(France) Pierre Dupuy (France) Pierre de Thoisy (France) Lionel Robert	ALD 01	BMW M88 3.5L I6		Did not arrive
DNA	Gr.C2	95	(United Kingdom) Bartlett Chevron Racing (private entrant)	(United Kingdom) John Bartlett (United Kingdom) Roger Andreason (France) François Migault	Chevron B62	Cosworth DFL 3.3L V8	A	Did not arrive
DNA	Gr.C2	97	(United Kingdom) Ray Baker Racing Tiga		Tiga GC285	Cosworth BDT 1778cc S4 turbo	A	Did not arrive
DNA	Gr.C2	101	(France) Graff Racing (France) J.-P. Grand (private entrant)		Rondeau M482	Cosworth DFV 3.0L V8	G	Did not arrive
DNA	Gr.C2	104	(France) J.-C. Ferrarin	(France) Jean-Claude Ferrarin (France) Philippe Mazué (France) Gérard Tremblay (France) Hubert Striebig	Isolia 002	Cosworth DFV 3.0L V8		Did not arrive
DNA	Gr.C2	105	(Italy) Kelmar Racing	(Italy) Pasquale Barberio (Switzerland) Jean-Pierre Frey	Tiga GC85	Cosworth DFV 3.0L V8	A	Did not arrive
DNA	Gr.B		(Switzerland) C. Haldi (private entrant)	(Switzerland) Claude Haldi	Porsche 930	Porsche 930/60 3.3L F6 turbo		Did not arrive

=== Class winners ===
Class	Winning car	Winning drivers
Group C1	#1 Porsche 962C	Bell / Stuck / Holbert *
IMSA-GTP	#21 March 85G	Cleare / Robert / Newsum
Group C2	#75 Gebhardt JC843	Harrower / Clements / Dodd-Noble *
IMSA-GTX	#180 Porsche 961	Metge / Ballot-Léna
Group B		no classified finishers

- Note: all classes set new distance records for the new circuit configuration.

=== Index of Energy Efficiency ===
Pos	Class	No	Team	Drivers	Chassis	Score
1	Gr.C2	70	(United Kingdom) Spice Engineering	(United Kingdom) Gordon Spice (United Kingdom) Ray Bellm (Belgium) Jean-Michel Martin	Spice-Fiero SE86C	1.107
2	Gr.C1	1	(West Germany) Rothmans Porsche	(United Kingdom) Derek Bell (West Germany) Hans-Joachim Stuck (United States) Al Holbert	Porsche 962C	1.013
3	Gr.C2	78	(United Kingdom) Ecurie Ecosse	(United States) Les Delano (United States) John Hotchkis (United States) Andy Petery	Ecosse C285	0.988
4	Gr.C2	75	(United Kingdom) ADA Engineering	(United Kingdom) Ian Harrower (United Kingdom) Evan Clements (United Kingdom) Tom Dodd-Noble	Gebhardt JC843	0.945
5	Gr.C2	90	Jens Winther Denmark (private entrant)	(Denmark) Jens Winther (United Kingdom) David Mercer (Denmark) Lars Viggo Jensen	URD C83	0.915
6	Gr.C2	102	(France) L. Rossiaud (private entrant)	(France) Lucien Rossiaud (France) Bruno Sotty (France) Noël del Bello	Rondeau M379C	0.911
7	Gr.C1	17	(Switzerland) Brun Motorsport	(Argentina) Oscar Larrauri (Spain) Jesús Pareja (France) Joël Gouhier	Porsche 962C	0.899
8	Gr.C1	14	(United Kingdom) Richard Lloyd Racing (United Kingdom) Liqui Moly Equipe	(Italy) Mauro Baldi (United States) Price Cobb (United States) Rob Dyson	Porsche 956 GTi	0.895
9	Gr.C1	8	(West Germany) Joest Racing	(United States) George Follmer (United States) John Morton (United States) Kenper Miller	Porsche 956B	0.895
10	Gr.C1	33	(United Kingdom) John Fitzpatrick Racing (Spain) Danone Porsche España	(Spain) Emilio de Villota (Spain) Fermín Velez (South Africa) George Fouché	Porsche 956B	0.861

- Note: Only the top ten positions are included in this set of standings.

=== Statistics ===
Taken from Quentin Spurring's book, officially licensed by the ACO

- Pole Position – J. Mass, #2 Porsche 962C– 3:16.0secs; 248.5 km/h (154.4 mph)
- Fastest Lap – K. Ludwig, #7 Porsche 956B – 3:23.3secs; 239.6 km/h (148.9 mph)
- Winning Distance – 4,972.73 km (3,089.91 mi)
- Winner's Average Speed – 207.20 km/h (128.75 mph)
- Attendance – 150,000

== Notes ==
World Sportscar Championship
Previous race: 1986 1000 km of Silverstone	1986 season	Next race: 1986 100 Miles of Norisring
