= 1988 24 Hours of Daytona =

27th 24 Hours of Daytona race

Previous: 1987	Next: 1989
Index: Races | Winners

Track map of Daytona International Speedway

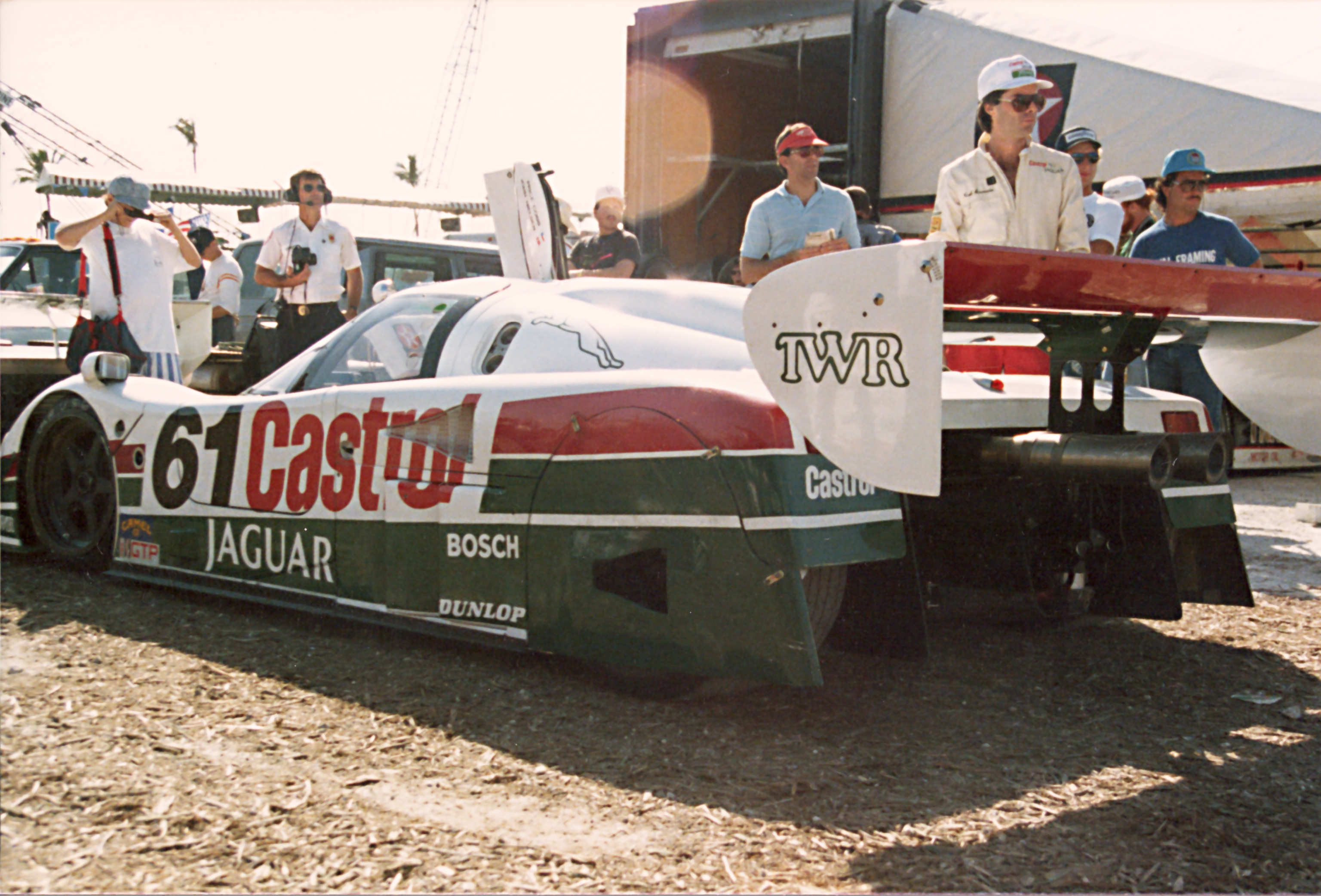
The sister car of the overall race winner.

The 26th Annual SunBank 24 at Daytona was a 24-hour endurance sports car race held on January 30–31, 1988 at the Daytona International Speedway road course. The race served as the opening round of the 1988 IMSA GT Championship.

Victory overall and in the GTP class went to the No. 60 Castrol Jaguar Racing Jaguar XJR-9 driven by Martin Brundle, Raul Boesel, and John Nielsen. Victory in the GTO Class went to the No. 11 Roush Racing Merkur XR4Ti driven by Scott Pruett, Paul Miller, Bob Akin, and Pete Halsmer. Victory in the Lights class went to the No. 9 Essex Racing Service Tiga GT286 driven by David Simpson, Tom Hessert Jr., and David Loring. Victory in the GTU class went to the No. 71 Team Highball Mazda RX-7 driven by Amos Johnson, Dennis Shaw, and Bob Lazier.

== Race results ==
Class winners in bold.

Pos	Class	No	Team	Drivers	Chassis	Laps
Pos	Class	No	Team	Drivers	Engine	Laps
1	**GTP**	**60**	(United Kingdom) **Castrol Jaguar Racing**	(United Kingdom) **Martin Brundle** (Brazil) **Raul Boesel** (Denmark) **John Nielsen**	**Jaguar XJR-9**	**728**
1	**GTP**	**60**	(United Kingdom) **Castrol Jaguar Racing**	(United Kingdom) **Martin Brundle** (Brazil) **Raul Boesel** (Denmark) **John Nielsen**	Jaguar 6.0L V12 N/A	**728**
2	GTP	67	(United States) Uniroyal Goodrich	(France) Bob Wollek (Italy) Mauro Baldi (United Kingdom) Brian Redman	Porsche 962	727
2	GTP	67	(United States) Uniroyal Goodrich	(France) Bob Wollek (Italy) Mauro Baldi (United Kingdom) Brian Redman	Porsche 3.0L Flat 6 Turbo	727
3	GTP	66	(United Kingdom) Castrol Jaguar Racing	(United States) Eddie Cheever (United Kingdom) John Watson (United Kingdom) Johnny Dumfries	Jaguar XJR-9	713
3	GTP	66	(United Kingdom) Castrol Jaguar Racing	(United States) Eddie Cheever (United Kingdom) John Watson (United Kingdom) Johnny Dumfries	Jaguar 6.0L V12 N/A	713
4	GTP	86	(United States) Bayside Motorsport	(Germany) Klaus Ludwig (Germany) Hans-Joachim Stuck (South Africa) Sarel van der Merwe	Porsche 962	694
4	GTP	86	(United States) Bayside Motorsport	(Germany) Klaus Ludwig (Germany) Hans-Joachim Stuck (South Africa) Sarel van der Merwe	Porsche 3.0L Flat 6 Turbo	694
5	GTP	15	(United States) Kalagian Racing	(United States) Jim Rothbarth (Mexico) Bernard Jourdain (Mexico) Michel Jourdain Sr. (United States) Rob Stevens	Porsche 962	680
5	GTP	15	(United States) Kalagian Racing	(United States) Jim Rothbarth (Mexico) Bernard Jourdain (Mexico) Michel Jourdain Sr. (United States) Rob Stevens	Porsche 3.0L Flat 6 Turbo	680
6	GTP	1	(United States) Copenhagen-A. J. Foyt Racing	(United States) A. J. Foyt (United States) Al Unser Jr. (United States) Elliott Forbes-Robinson	Porsche 962	675
6	GTP	1	(United States) Copenhagen-A. J. Foyt Racing	(United States) A. J. Foyt (United States) Al Unser Jr. (United States) Elliott Forbes-Robinson	Porsche 3.0L Flat 6 Turbo	675
7 DNF	GTP	14	(United States) Holbert Racing	(United States) Al Holbert (United States) Chip Robinson (United Kingdom) Derek Bell	Porsche 962	660
7 DNF	GTP	14	(United States) Holbert Racing	(United States) Al Holbert (United States) Chip Robinson (United Kingdom) Derek Bell	Porsche 3.0L Flat 6 Turbo	660
8 DNF	GTP	09	(United States) Jiffy Lube Firebird	(United States) Steve Durst (United States) Mike Brockman (United States) Bob Earl (United States) Gary Belcher	Spice SE86CL	651
8 DNF	GTP	09	(United States) Jiffy Lube Firebird	(United States) Steve Durst (United States) Mike Brockman (United States) Bob Earl (United States) Gary Belcher	Pontiac 4.5L V6 N/A	651
9	GTP	16	(United States) Dyson Racing	(United States) Price Cobb (United Kingdom) James Weaver (United States) Rob Dyson (Australia) Vern Schuppan	Porsche 962	638
9	GTP	16	(United States) Dyson Racing	(United States) Price Cobb (United Kingdom) James Weaver (United States) Rob Dyson (Australia) Vern Schuppan	Porsche 3.0L Flat 6 Turbo	638
10	**GTO**	**11**	(United States) **Roush Racing**	(United States) **Scott Pruett** (United States) **Paul Miller** (United States) **Bob Akin** (United States) **Pete Halsmer**	**Merkur XR4Ti**	**634**
10	**GTO**	**11**	(United States) **Roush Racing**	(United States) **Scott Pruett** (United States) **Paul Miller** (United States) **Bob Akin** (United States) **Pete Halsmer**	**Ford 5.9L V8 N/A**	**634**
11	GTO	03	(United States) Skoal Bandit Racing	(United States) Buz McCall (United States) Paul Dallenbach (United States) Max Jones (United States) Jack Baldwin	Chevrolet Camaro	634
11	GTO	03	(United States) Skoal Bandit Racing	(United States) Buz McCall (United States) Paul Dallenbach (United States) Max Jones (United States) Jack Baldwin	Chevrolet 5.7L V8 N/A	634
12	**Lights**	**9**	(United States) **Essex Racing Service**	(United States) **David Simpson** (United States) **Tom Hessert Jr.** (United States) **David Loring**	**Tiga GT286**	**617**
12	**Lights**	**9**	(United States) **Essex Racing Service**	(United States) **David Simpson** (United States) **Tom Hessert Jr.** (United States) **David Loring**	Buick 3.0L V6 N/A	**617**
13	Lights	63	(United States) Downing/Atlanta	(United States) Howard Katz (Japan) Hiro Matsushita (United States) Jim Downing	Argo JM19	615
13	Lights	63	(United States) Downing/Atlanta	(United States) Howard Katz (Japan) Hiro Matsushita (United States) Jim Downing	Mazda 1.3L 2 Rotor	615
14	Lights	55	(United States) Huffaker Racing	(United States) Terry Visger (United States) Paul Lewis (United States) Jon Woodner	Spice SE86CL	599
14	Lights	55	(United States) Huffaker Racing	(United States) Terry Visger (United States) Paul Lewis (United States) Jon Woodner	Pontiac Super Duty 3.0L I4 N/A	599
15	**GTU**	**71**	(United States) **Team Highball**	(United States) **Amos Johnson** (United States) **Dennis Shaw** (United States) **Buddy Lazier**	**Mazda RX-7**	**598**
15	**GTU**	**71**	(United States) **Team Highball**	(United States) **Amos Johnson** (United States) **Dennis Shaw** (United States) **Buddy Lazier**	**Mazda 1.3L 2 Rotor**	**598**
16	GTO	38	(United States) Mandeville Auto/Tech	(United States) Roger Mandeville (United States) Kelly Marsh (United States) Don Marsh	Mazda RX-7	597
16	GTO	38	(United States) Mandeville Auto/Tech	(United States) Roger Mandeville (United States) Kelly Marsh (United States) Don Marsh	Mazda 1.9L 3 Rotor	597
17	GTU	04	(United States) SP Racing	(United States) Gary Auberlen (United States) Adrian Gang (United States) Cary Eisenlohr (United States) Bill Auberlen	Porsche 911 Carrera	586
17	GTU	04	(United States) SP Racing	(United States) Gary Auberlen (United States) Adrian Gang (United States) Cary Eisenlohr (United States) Bill Auberlen	Porsche Flat 6 N/A	
18	GTU	89	(United States) 901 Racing	(United States) Peter Uria (United States) Jack Refenning (United States) Larry Figaro (United States) Rusty Scott	Porsche 911 Carrera RSR	577
18	GTU	89	(United States) 901 Racing	(United States) Peter Uria (United States) Jack Refenning (United States) Larry Figaro (United States) Rusty Scott	Porsche 3.2L Flat 6 N/A	577
19	GTU	47	(United States) Cumberland Valley Racing	(United States) Richard Oakley (United States) Matt Mnich (Canada) Doug Mills	Mazda RX-7	573
19	GTU	47	(United States) Cumberland Valley Racing	(United States) Richard Oakley (United States) Matt Mnich (Canada) Doug Mills	Mazda 1.3L 2 Rotor	573
20	GTO	33	(United States) Roush Racing	(United States) Andy Petery (United States) Les Delano (United States) Craig Carter	Mercury Capri	568
20	GTO	33	(United States) Roush Racing	(United States) Andy Petery (United States) Les Delano (United States) Craig Carter	Ford 5.9L V8 N/A	568
21 DNF	Lights	01	(United States) AT&T Spice Engineering	(United States) Don Bell (United States) Charles Morgan (Greece) Costas Los	Spice SE87L	566
21 DNF	Lights	01	(United States) AT&T Spice Engineering	(United States) Don Bell (United States) Charles Morgan (Greece) Costas Los	Pontiac Super Duty 3.0L I4 N/A	566
22	Lights	19	(United States) Essex Racing Service	(United States) Ron McKay (United States) Bill Jacobson (United States) Jim Brown	Tiga GT286	557
22	Lights	19	(United States) Essex Racing Service	(United States) Ron McKay (United States) Bill Jacobson (United States) Jim Brown	Mazda 1.3L 2 Rotor	557
23	Lights	42	(United States) Lamas Motor Racing	(United States) Jack Newsum (United States) Howard Cherry (United States) Tim McAdam (United States) John Higgins	Fabcar CL	554
23	Lights	42	(United States) Lamas Motor Racing	(United States) Jack Newsum (United States) Howard Cherry (United States) Tim McAdam (United States) John Higgins	Porsche 3.0L Flat 6 N/A	554
24	GTU	95	(United States) Leitzinger Racing	(United States) Bob Leitzinger (United States) Chuck Kurtz (United States) Butch Leitzinger	Nissan 300ZX Z32	541
24	GTU	95	(United States) Leitzinger Racing	(United States) Bob Leitzinger (United States) Chuck Kurtz (United States) Butch Leitzinger	Nissan VG30DE 3.0L V6 N/A	541
25	GTO	68	(United States) Greg Walker Racing	(United States) Greg Walker (United States) King Smith (United States) Scott Lagasse	Chevrolet Corvette C4	527
25	GTO	68	(United States) Greg Walker Racing	(United States) Greg Walker (United States) King Smith (United States) Scott Lagasse	Chevrolet 5.9L V8 N/A	527
26 DNF	GTP	61	(United Kingdom) Castrol Jaguar Racing	(United States) Davy Jones (United States) Danny Sullivan (Netherlands) Jan Lammers	Jaguar XJR-9	512
26 DNF	GTP	61	(United Kingdom) Castrol Jaguar Racing	(United States) Davy Jones (United States) Danny Sullivan (Netherlands) Jan Lammers	Jaguar 6.0L V12 N/A	512
27	Lights	80	(United States) Gaston Andrey Racing	(Italy) Martino Finotto (Italy) Pietro Silva (Italy) Guido Daccò	Alba AR6	506
27	Lights	80	(United States) Gaston Andrey Racing	(Italy) Martino Finotto (Italy) Pietro Silva (Italy) Guido Daccò	Ferrari 2.9L V8 N/A	506
28 DNF	GTO	99	(United States) All American Racers	(United States) Willy T. Ribbs (United States) Rocky Moran (Argentina) Juan Manuel Fangio II	Toyota Celica Turbo ST165	502
28 DNF	GTO	99	(United States) All American Racers	(United States) Willy T. Ribbs (United States) Rocky Moran (Argentina) Juan Manuel Fangio II	Toyota 4T-GTE 2.1L I4 Turbo	502
29 DNF	Lights	36	(United States) Erie Scientific	(United States) John Grooms (United States) Tom Bagley (United States) John Fergus (United States) Frank Jellinek	Argo JM16	496
29 DNF	Lights	36	(United States) Erie Scientific	(United States) John Grooms (United States) Tom Bagley (United States) John Fergus (United States) Frank Jellinek	Mazda 1.3L 2 Rotor	496
30 DNF	GTO	18	(United States) Jack Lewis Enterprises	(United States) Bob Beasley (United States) Steve Volk (United States) Jack Lewis	Porsche 911 Carrera RSR	490
30 DNF	GTO	18	(United States) Jack Lewis Enterprises	(United States) Bob Beasley (United States) Steve Volk (United States) Jack Lewis	Porsche Flat 6 N/A	490
31 DNF	GTO	84	(United States) Car Enterprises	(United States) Bill Wesel (United States) Craig Rubright (United States) Garrett Jenkins	Chevrolet Camaro	479
31 DNF	GTO	84	(United States) Car Enterprises	(United States) Bill Wesel (United States) Craig Rubright (United States) Garrett Jenkins	Chevrolet 5.7L V8 N/A	479
32 DNF	GTO	5	(United States) Polyvoltac/Protofab	(United States) Tommy Archer (United States) Chip Mead (Canada) Bill Adam	Chevrolet Corvette	467
32 DNF	GTO	5	(United States) Polyvoltac/Protofab	(United States) Tommy Archer (United States) Chip Mead (Canada) Bill Adam	Chevrolet 5.9L V8 N/A	467
33	GTU	56	(United States) Escort Porsche	(United States) Karl Durkheimer (United States) Monte Shelton (United States) Jim Torres (United States) Nort Northam	Porsche 911 Carrera	455
33	GTU	56	(United States) Escort Porsche	(United States) Karl Durkheimer (United States) Monte Shelton (United States) Jim Torres (United States) Nort Northam	Porsche Flat 6 N/A	455
34 DNF	GTU	75	(United States) CCR	(United States) Bart Kendall (United States) Johnny Unser (United States) Tom Frank	Mazda RX-7	446
34 DNF	GTU	75	(United States) CCR	(United States) Bart Kendall (United States) Johnny Unser (United States) Tom Frank	Mazda 1.3L 2 Rotor	446
35	GTU	17	(United States) Al Bacon Performance	(United States) Al Bacon (United States) Bob Reed (United States) John Hogdal	Mazda RX-7	445
35	GTU	17	(United States) Al Bacon Performance	(United States) Al Bacon (United States) Bob Reed (United States) John Hogdal	Mazda 1.3L 2 Rotor	445
36 DNF	GTP	7	(United States) Tom Milner Racing	(United States) Bruce Jenner (Canada) Scott Goodyear (Netherlands) Arie Luyendyk (United States) Tom Gloy (United Kingdom) Calvin Fish (United States) Thomas Schwietz	Ford Probe GTP	418
36 DNF	GTP	7	(United States) Tom Milner Racing	(United States) Bruce Jenner (Canada) Scott Goodyear (Netherlands) Arie Luyendyk (United States) Tom Gloy (United Kingdom) Calvin Fish (United States) Thomas Schwietz	Cosworth BDA 2.1L I4 Turbo	418
37 DNF	GTO	98	(United States) All American Racers	(United States) Chris Cord (United States) Dennis Aase (New Zealand) Steve Millen	Toyota Celica Turbo ST165	416
37 DNF	GTO	98	(United States) All American Racers	(United States) Chris Cord (United States) Dennis Aase (New Zealand) Steve Millen	Toyota 4T-GTE 2.1L I4 Turbo	416
38	GTO	92	(United States) Puleo Racing	(United States) Steve Zwiren (United States) Mark Montgomery (United States) Anthony Puleo	Pontiac Firebird	402
38	GTO	92	(United States) Puleo Racing	(United States) Steve Zwiren (United States) Mark Montgomery (United States) Anthony Puleo	Chevrolet 5.7L V8 N/A	402
39 DNF	GTO	2	(United States) Polyvoltac/Protofab	(United States) Greg Pickett (Canada) John Jones (United States) Tommy Riggins	Chevrolet Corvette C4	398
39 DNF	GTO	2	(United States) Polyvoltac/Protofab	(United States) Greg Pickett (Canada) John Jones (United States) Tommy Riggins	Chevrolet 5.9L V8 N/A	398
40 DNF	GTO	76	(United States) CCR	(United States) John Morton (United States) Parnelli Jones (United States) P. J. Jones	Mazda RX-7	389
40 DNF	GTO	76	(United States) CCR	(United States) John Morton (United States) Parnelli Jones (United States) P. J. Jones	Mazda 1.9L 3 Rotor	389
41 DNF	GTO	6	(United States) Roush Racing	(United States) Kenper Miller (United States) Bob Akin (United States) Paul Gentilozzi	Merkur XR4Ti	388
41 DNF	GTO	6	(United States) Roush Racing	(United States) Kenper Miller (United States) Bob Akin (United States) Paul Gentilozzi	Ford 2.5L I4 Turbo	388
42 DNF	Lights	23	(United States) Motion Promotion	(United States) George Petrilak (United States) Rex McDaniel (United States) Bruce MacInnes	Argo JM16	379
42 DNF	Lights	23	(United States) Motion Promotion	(United States) George Petrilak (United States) Rex McDaniel (United States) Bruce MacInnes	Buick 3.0L V6 N/A	379
43 DNF	Lights	4	(United States) S&L Racing	(United States) Jim Miller (United States) Linda Ludemann (United States) Scott Schubot	Spice SE88P	369
43 DNF	Lights	4	(United States) S&L Racing	(United States) Jim Miller (United States) Linda Ludemann (United States) Scott Schubot	Buick 3.0L V6 N/A	369
44 DNF	GTO	22	(United States) Roush Racing	(United States) Mark Martin (United States) Lyn St. James (United States) Deborah Gregg (United States) Pete Halsmer	Mercury Capri	349
44 DNF	GTO	22	(United States) Roush Racing	(United States) Mark Martin (United States) Lyn St. James (United States) Deborah Gregg (United States) Pete Halsmer	Ford 5.9L V8 N/A	349
45 DNF	GTO	81	(United States) Sentry Bank Equipment	(United States) Ken Bupp (United States) Jack Boxstrom (United States) Kent Painter (United States) Guy Church	Chevrolet Camaro	345
45 DNF	GTO	81	(United States) Sentry Bank Equipment	(United States) Ken Bupp (United States) Jack Boxstrom (United States) Kent Painter (United States) Guy Church	Chevrolet 5.7L V8 N/A	345
46 DNF	GTP	72	(United Kingdom) Roy Baker	(United States) Mike Allison (United States) Stephen Hynes (United Kingdom) Chris Ashmore	Tiga GC286	329
46 DNF	GTP	72	(United Kingdom) Roy Baker	(United States) Mike Allison (United States) Stephen Hynes (United Kingdom) Chris Ashmore	Cosworth DFL 3.3L V8 N/A	329
47 DNF	Lights	35	(United States) Diman Racing	(Puerto Rico) Mandy Gonzalez (United States) Skip Winfree (Puerto Rico) Manuel Villa (United States) John Schneider	Royale RP40	302
47 DNF	Lights	35	(United States) Diman Racing	(Puerto Rico) Mandy Gonzalez (United States) Skip Winfree (Puerto Rico) Manuel Villa (United States) John Schneider	Porsche 3.0L Flat 6 N/A	302
48 DNF	Lights	79	(United States) Winters/Whitehall	(United States) Skeeter McKitterick (United States) Bill Koll (United States) Tom Winters (France) Claude Ballot-Léna (Switzerland) Mario Hytten	Spice SE87L	297
48 DNF	Lights	79	(United States) Winters/Whitehall	(United States) Skeeter McKitterick (United States) Bill Koll (United States) Tom Winters (France) Claude Ballot-Léna (Switzerland) Mario Hytten	Pontiac Super Duty 3.0L I4 N/A	297
49	GTU	51	(United States) Mardi Gras Racing	(United Kingdom) Colin Richard (United States) Rene Azcona (United States) Bob Copeman	Porsche 911 Carrera RSR	278
49	GTU	51	(United States) Mardi Gras Racing	(United Kingdom) Colin Richard (United States) Rene Azcona (United States) Bob Copeman	Porsche Flat 6 N/A	278
50 DNF	GTP	3	(Switzerland) Brun Motorsport-Torno	(Italy) Gianfranco Brancatelli (Argentina) Oscar Larrauri (Italy) Massimo Sigala	Porsche 962	277
50 DNF	GTP	3	(Switzerland) Brun Motorsport-Torno	(Italy) Gianfranco Brancatelli (Argentina) Oscar Larrauri (Italy) Massimo Sigala	Porsche 3.0L Flat 6 Turbo	277
51	GTO	39	(United States) HRG Associates	(United States) Bob Hebert (United States) Paul Reisman (United States) Andy Strasser	Pontiac Firebird	269
52 DNF	GTU	82	(United States) Apenn Inn	(United States) Dick Greer (United States) Mike Mees (United States) John Finger	Mazda RX-7	243
53 DNF	GTP	31	(Italy) Buick Momo March	(United States) Steve Phillips (United States) Jeff Andretti (Republic of Ireland) Michael Roe	March 86G	213
54 DNF	Lights	06	(United States) Brown Racing	(United States) Ron Nelson (United States) Bobby Brown (United States) Billy Hagen (United States) Sterling Marlin	Tiga GT286	165
55 DNF	GTO	29	(United States) Overbagh Motor Racing	(United States) Oma Kimbrough (United States) Hoyt Overbagh (United States) Chris Gennone (United States) David Kicak	Chevrolet Camaro	165
56 DNF	Lights	58	(United States) Gary Wonzer	(United States) Jonathan Green (United States) Joseph Hamilton (United States) Bill Bean (United States) Gary Wonzer	Lola T616	151
57 DNF	GTU	28	(United States) Florida Fixtures	(United States) Russ Church (United States) Daniel Urrutia (United States) E. J. Generotti (United States) Dennis Vitolo	Mazda RX-7	150
58 DNF	Lights	27	(United States) MSB Racing	(United States) Dave Cowart (United States) Jim Fowells (United States) Ray Mummery (United States) Mike Meyer	Argo JM19	146
59 DNF	Lights	88	(United States) Transact, Inc.	(United States) Steve Johnson (United States) Bob Strait (Australia) Geoff Nicol	Argo JM19 B	132
60 DNF	Lights	40	(United States) Gaston Andrey Racing	(Switzerland) Angelo Pallavicini (Italy) Paolo Guatamacchia (Canada) Uli Bieri (United States) Tommy Johnson	Alba AR2	126
61 DNF	GTP	44	(United States) Group 44	(United States) Bob Tullius (United States) Whitney Ganz (United States) Hurley Haywood	Jaguar XJR-7	122
62 DNF	GTO	12	(United States) Bobby Allison Racing	(United States) Bobby Allison (United States) Clifford Allison (United States) Dick Danielson	Buick Somerset	104
63 DNF	GTP	10	(United States) Hotchkis Racing, Inc.	(United States) Jim Adams (United States) John Hotchkis (United States) John Hotchkis Jr.	Porsche 962	98
64 DNF	GTP	05	(United Kingdom) A.D.A. Engineering	(South Africa) Wayne Taylor (United Kingdom) Ian Harrower (United Kingdom) Ian Flux (Sweden) Stanley Dickens	ADA 03	88
65 DNF	GTU	08	(United States) Simms-Romano Enterprises	(United States) Steve Burgner (United States) Paul Romano (United States) Bill Colom (United States) Jeff Green	Mazda RX-7	87
66 DNF	Lights	48	(United States) Lamas Motor Racing	(Canada) Charles Monk (United States) Perry King (United States) Lorenzo Lamas	Fabcar CL	80
67	GTP	24	(United States) Briody Racing	(United States) John McComb (United States) Jim Briody (United States) Bob Nagel	March 84G	80
68 DNF	Lights	97	(United States) Winters/Whitehall	(France) Claude Ballot-Léna (France) Jean-Louis Ricci (United States) Olindo Iacobelli	Spice SE88P	77
69 DNF	GTP	21	(United States) John Wood Racing	(United States) Brent O'Neill (United States) John Wood (United States) David Rocha	Alba AR5	68
70 DNF	GTU	53	(United States) Team Shelby	(United States) Tim Evans (United States) Jack Broomall (United States) Garth Ullom (United States) Neil Hanneman	Dodge Daytona	66
71 DNF	GTU	00	(United States) Full-Time Racing	(United States) Kal Showket (United States) Dorsey Schroeder (United States) Phil Currin	Dodge Daytona	62
72 DNF	GTP	96	(United States) URD Junior Team	(United States) Phil Mahre (Germany) Hellmut Mundas (United States) Steve Mahre	URD C82	60
73 DNF	GTP	20	(United States) Data-Gas	(United States) Richard McDill (United States) Tom Juckette (United States) Bill McDill	March 84G	54
74 DNF	GTP	30	(Italy) Buick Momo March	(Republic of Ireland) Michael Roe (Italy) Giampiero Moretti (Italy) Paolo Barilla	March 86G	39
75 DNF	GTO	94	(United States) Ash Tisdelle	(United States) Rusty Bond (United States) Ash Tisdelle (United States) Lance van Every	Chevrolet Camaro	18
DNS	GTP	8	(United States) Fabcar American Racing	(United States) Chip Mead (United States) Tim McAdam (United States) Larry McDonough	Fabcar GTP	-
DNS	GTO	45	(United States) K&P Racing	(United States) Karl Keck (United States) Mark Kennedy (United States) Gary Wonzer (United States) Brian Cameron	Chevrolet Corvette	-
DNS	Lights	65	(United States) Gary English	(United States) Gary English (United States) Jerry Thompson (United States) Gene Felton (United States) Mike Laws	Royale RP40	-
DNS	GTP	77	(United States) Tom Milner Racing	(Netherlands) Arie Luyendyk (United States) Tom Gloy (United States) Tom Pumpelly	Ford Mustang Probe	-
