= 1988 1000 km of Monza =

Sports Car Race

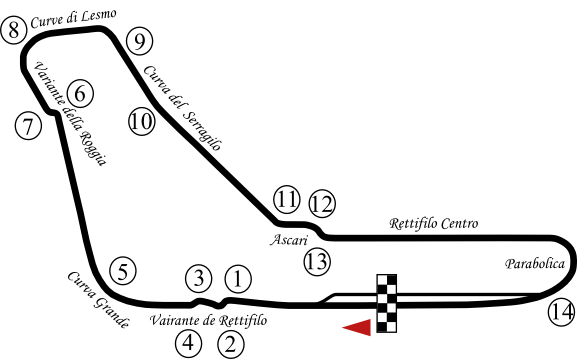
Layout of the Autodromo Nazionale di Monza (1976-1993)

The 1988 1000 km di Monza was the third round of the 1988 World Sportscar Championship season. It took place at the Autodromo Nazionale Monza, Italy on April 10, 1988.

== Official results ==
Class winners in bold. Cars failing to complete 75% of the winner's distance marked as Not Classified (NC).

Pos	Class	No	Team	Drivers	Chassis	Tyre	Laps
Pos	Class	No	Team	Drivers	Engine	Tyre	Laps
1	**C1**	**1**	**(United Kingdom) Silk Cut Jaguar**	**(United Kingdom) Martin Brundle (United States) Eddie Cheever**	**Jaguar XJR-9**	**D**	**173**
1	**C1**	**1**	**(United Kingdom) Silk Cut Jaguar**	**(United Kingdom) Martin Brundle (United States) Eddie Cheever**	**Jaguar 7.0L V12**	**D**	**173**
2	C1	61	(Switzerland) Team Sauber Mercedes	(France) Jean-Louis Schlesser (Italy) Mauro Baldi (Germany) Jochen Mass	Sauber C9	**MI**	172
2	C1	61	(Switzerland) Team Sauber Mercedes	(France) Jean-Louis Schlesser (Italy) Mauro Baldi (Germany) Jochen Mass	Mercedes-Benz M117 5.0L Turbo V8	**MI**	172
3	C1	6	(Switzerland) Brun Motorsport	(Argentina) Oscar Larrauri (Italy) Massimo Sigala	Porsche 962C	**MI**	171
3	C1	6	(Switzerland) Brun Motorsport	(Argentina) Oscar Larrauri (Italy) Massimo Sigala	Porsche Type-935 3.0L Turbo Flat-6	**MI**	171
4	C1	8	(Germany) Joest Racing	(Germany) Frank Jelinski (Germany) "John Winter"	Porsche 962C	**G**	168
4	C1	8	(Germany) Joest Racing	(Germany) Frank Jelinski (Germany) "John Winter"	Porsche Type-935 3.0L Turbo Flat-6	**G**	168
5	C1	7	(Germany) Joest Racing	(Germany) Klaus Ludwig (France) Bob Wollek	Porsche 962C	**G**	164
5	C1	7	(Germany) Joest Racing	(Germany) Klaus Ludwig (France) Bob Wollek	Porsche Type-935 3.0L Turbo Flat-6	**G**	164
6	C1	10	(Germany) Porsche Kremer Racing	(Germany) Volker Weidler (Italy) Bruno Giacomelli	Porsche 962C	**Y**	164
6	C1	10	(Germany) Porsche Kremer Racing	(Germany) Volker Weidler (Italy) Bruno Giacomelli	Porsche Type-935 3.0L Turbo Flat-6	**Y**	164
7	C1	13	(France) Primagaz Competition	(France) Pierre-Henri Raphanel (Italy) Roberto Ravaglia	Cougar C20B	**MI**	162
7	C1	13	(France) Primagaz Competition	(France) Pierre-Henri Raphanel (Italy) Roberto Ravaglia	Porsche Type-935 3.0L Turbo Flat-6	**MI**	162
8	**C2**	**111**	**(United Kingdom) Spice Engineering**	**(United Kingdom) Ray Bellm (United Kingdom) Gordon Spice**	**Spice SE88C**	**G**	**158**
8	**C2**	**111**	**(United Kingdom) Spice Engineering**	**(United Kingdom) Ray Bellm (United Kingdom) Gordon Spice**	**Ford Cosworth DFL 3.3L V8**	**G**	**158**
9	C1	40	(Switzerland) Swiss Team Salamin	(United Kingdom) Dudley Wood (Switzerland) Antoine Salamin	Porsche 962C	**G**	157
9	C1	40	(Switzerland) Swiss Team Salamin	(United Kingdom) Dudley Wood (Switzerland) Antoine Salamin	Porsche Type-935 3.0L Turbo Flat-6	**G**	157
10	C2	103	(United Kingdom) Spice Engineering	(Italy) Almo Coppelli (Denmark) Thorkild Thyrring	Spice SE88C	**G**	157
10	C2	103	(United Kingdom) Spice Engineering	(Italy) Almo Coppelli (Denmark) Thorkild Thyrring	Ford Cosworth DFL 3.3L V8	**G**	157
11	C2	107	(United Kingdom) Chamberlain Engineering	(France) Claude Ballot-Léna (France) Jean-Louis Ricci	Spice SE88C	**A**	143
11	C2	107	(United Kingdom) Chamberlain Engineering	(France) Claude Ballot-Léna (France) Jean-Louis Ricci	Ford Cosworth DFL 3.3L V8	**A**	143
12 DNF	C2	117	(Norway) Team Lucky Strike Schanche	(Norway) Martin Schanche (United Kingdom) Will Hoy	Argo JM19C	**G**	153
12 DNF	C2	117	(Norway) Team Lucky Strike Schanche	(Norway) Martin Schanche (United Kingdom) Will Hoy	Ford Cosworth DFL 3.3L V8	**G**	153
13 DNF	C1	5	(Switzerland) Brun Motorsport	(Germany) Manuel Reuter (Spain) Jesús Pareja	Porsche 962C	**MI**	143
13 DNF	C1	5	(Switzerland) Brun Motorsport	(Germany) Manuel Reuter (Spain) Jesús Pareja	Porsche Type-935 3.0L Turbo Flat-6	**MI**	143
14 DNF	C1	2	(United Kingdom) Silk Cut Jaguar	(Netherlands) Jan Lammers (United Kingdom) Johnny Dumfries	Jaguar XJR-9	**D**	114
14 DNF	C1	2	(United Kingdom) Silk Cut Jaguar	(Netherlands) Jan Lammers (United Kingdom) Johnny Dumfries	Jaguar 7.0L V12	**D**	114
15 DNF	C1	4	(Switzerland) Brun Motorsport	(Switzerland) Walter Brun (Germany) Uwe Schäfer	Porsche 962C	**MI**	114
15 DNF	C1	4	(Switzerland) Brun Motorsport	(Switzerland) Walter Brun (Germany) Uwe Schäfer	Porsche Type-935 3.0L Turbo Flat-6	**MI**	114
16 DNF	C2	177	(France) Automobiles Louis Descartes	(France) Dominique Lacaud (France) Jacques Heuclin (France) Gérard Tremblay	ALD C2	**A**	63
16 DNF	C2	177	(France) Automobiles Louis Descartes	(France) Dominique Lacaud (France) Jacques Heuclin (France) Gérard Tremblay	BMW M80 3.5L I6	**A**	63
17 DNF	C2	151	(Switzerland) Pierre-Alain Lombardi	(Switzerland) Pierre-Alain Lombardi (Switzerland) Silvio Vaglio (Switzerland) Rolando Vaglio	Rondeau M379C	**A**	53
17 DNF	C2	151	(Switzerland) Pierre-Alain Lombardi	(Switzerland) Pierre-Alain Lombardi (Switzerland) Silvio Vaglio (Switzerland) Rolando Vaglio	Ford Cosworth DFL 3.0L V8	**A**	53
18 DNF	C2	127	(United Kingdom) Chamberlain Engineering	(South Africa) Graham Duxbury (United Kingdom) Nick Adams	Spice SE86C	**A**	38
18 DNF	C2	127	(United Kingdom) Chamberlain Engineering	(South Africa) Graham Duxbury (United Kingdom) Nick Adams	Hart 418T 1.8L Turbo I4	**A**	38
19 DNF	C2	191	(United Kingdom) PC Automotive	(United Kingdom) Richard Piper (Republic of Ireland) Martin Birrane (United States) Olindo Iacobelli	Argo JM19C	**G**	24
19 DNF	C2	191	(United Kingdom) PC Automotive	(United Kingdom) Richard Piper (Republic of Ireland) Martin Birrane (United States) Olindo Iacobelli	Ford Cosworth DFL 3.3L V8	**G**	24
20 DNF	C2	109	(Italy) Kelmar Racing	(Italy) Ranieri Randaccio (Italy) Vito Veninata (Italy) Pasquale Barberio	Tiga GC85	**A**	23
20 DNF	C2	109	(Italy) Kelmar Racing	(Italy) Ranieri Randaccio (Italy) Vito Veninata (Italy) Pasquale Barberio	Ford Cosworth DFL 3.3L V8	**A**	23
21 DNF	C2	123	(United Kingdom) Charles Ivey Racing	(South Africa) Wayne Taylor (United Kingdom) Tim Harvey	Tiga GC287	**D**	17
21 DNF	C2	123	(United Kingdom) Charles Ivey Racing	(South Africa) Wayne Taylor (United Kingdom) Tim Harvey	Porsche Type-935 2.8L Turbo Flat-6	**D**	17
22 DNF	C1	24	(Italy) Mussato Action Car (Italy) Dollop Racing	(Italy) Andrea de Cesaris (Germany) Christian Danner	Lancia LC2	**D**	11
22 DNF	C1	24	(Italy) Mussato Action Car (Italy) Dollop Racing	(Italy) Andrea de Cesaris (Germany) Christian Danner	Ferrari 308C 3.0L Turbo V8	**D**	11
23 DNF	C2	101	(Italy) Dollop Racing	(Italy) Nicola Marozzo (Switzerland) Jean-Pierre Frey	Argo JM19B	**G**	9
23 DNF	C2	101	(Italy) Dollop Racing	(Italy) Nicola Marozzo (Switzerland) Jean-Pierre Frey	Ford Cosworth DFL 3.3L V8	**G**	9
24 DNF	C2	121	(United Kingdom) Cosmik GP Motorsport	(France) Philippe de Henning (Greece) Costas Los	Spice SE87C	**G**	6
24 DNF	C2	121	(United Kingdom) Cosmik GP Motorsport	(France) Philippe de Henning (Greece) Costas Los	Ford Cosworth DFL 3.3L V8	**G**	6
25 DNF	C2	172	(France) Automobiles Louis Descartes	(Morocco) Max Cohen-Olivar (France) Pierre Yver	ALD C2	**A**	6
25 DNF	C2	172	(France) Automobiles Louis Descartes	(Morocco) Max Cohen-Olivar (France) Pierre Yver	BMW M80 3.5L I6	**A**	6
26 DNF	C2	160	(Germany) Gebhardt Motorsport	(Germany) Hellmut Mundas (Germany) Günter Gebhardt (Germany) Rudi Seher	Gebhardt JC873	?	2
26 DNF	C2	160	(Germany) Gebhardt Motorsport	(Germany) Hellmut Mundas (Germany) Günter Gebhardt (Germany) Rudi Seher	Audi 1.9L Turbo I5	?	2
DNS	C1	42	(France) Noël del Bello	(France) Jacques Guillot (France) Roland Biancone (Switzerland) Bernard Santal	Sauber C8	**G**	-
DNS	C1	42	(France) Noël del Bello	(France) Jacques Guillot (France) Roland Biancone (Switzerland) Bernard Santal	Mercedes-Benz M117 5.0L Turbo V8	**G**	-
DNS	C2	181	(Italy) Techno Racing	(Italy) Giovanni Lavaggi (Italy) Luigi Taverna	Olmas GLT-200	**A**	-
DNS	C2	181	(Italy) Techno Racing	(Italy) Giovanni Lavaggi (Italy) Luigi Taverna	Ford Cosworth DFL 3.0L V8	**A**	-

== Statistics ==
- Pole Position - #61 Team Sauber Mercedes - 1:31.690
- Fastest Lap - #61 Team Sauber Mercedes - 1:35.750
- Average Speed - 206.019 km/h

World Sportscar Championship
Previous race: 1988 360km of Jarama	1988 season	Next race: 1988 1000km of Silverstone
