= Argo Racing Cars =

British racing team

(United Kingdom) Argo Racing Cars
- Argo JM20
- Founded: 1976
- Folded: 2009
- Team principal(s): Jo Marquart; Nick Jordan; David Sears
- Founder(s): Jo Marquart; Nick Jordan
- Former series: Formula 3 Formula Atlantic; Formula Super Vee; Formula Ford 2000; World Sportscar Championship; IMSA GT Championship; BRDC C2 Championship; Formula Asia; A1 Grand Prix
- Teams' Championships: IMSA GT Championship: 1985, 1986, 1987
- Drivers' Championships: SCCA Super Vee Gold Cup: 1978: Bill Alsup; USAC Mini-Indy Series: 1978: Bill Alsup; SCCA National Championship Runoffs: 1982: Terry McKenna; IMSA GT Championship: 1985: Jim Downing; 1986: Jim Downing; 1987: Jim Downing; British Formula Two Championship: 1993: Philippe Adams

Argo JM21 on display

Argo JM1 on display at the 2015 Pau Grand Prix

Argo Racing Cars Ltd. is a British racing constructor founded by Swiss designer Jo Marquart and British mechanic Nick Jordan as part of their Anglia Cars racing team in the 1980s. The company initially constructed a variety of open-wheel cars for national and international Formula Three, as well as the Formula Atlantic and Formula Super Vee series. The company later built sports prototypes for the World Sportscar Championship's C2 class and the North American IMSA GT Championship's IMSA Lights category, winning several championships.

Argo produced in excess of 100 chassis between 1983 and 1993. Production included 7 JM16 and 19 JM19 sports prototype chassis. Argo Racing Cars was later purchased by David Sears and the former headquarters now houses his Super Nova Racing team.

The Argo Racing Cars name was resurrected in later years for use in the A1 Grand Prix championship, where they supported A1 Team Lebanon and A1 Team India.

== Major titles ==
- 8 HSR Historic GTP Series titles with the JM19
- 3 IMSA GT Championship GTP Lights Class constructor titles
- 3 IMSA GT Championship GTP Lights Class driver titles with Jim Downing
- 3 24 Hours of Daytona GTP Lights Class wins
- 3 12 Hours of Sebring GTP Lights Class wins
- 1 SCCA National Championship Runoffs with Terry McKenna
- 1 USAC Mini-Indy Series with Bill Alsup
- 1 SCCA Super Vee Gold Cup with Bill Alsup

== Racecars ==
Year	Racing car	Racing category
1977	Argo JM1	Formula 3
1978	Argo JM2	Formula Super Vee
1979	Argo JM1X	Formula Atlantic
1979	Argo JM3	Formula 3
1979	Argo JM4	Formula Super Vee
1980	Argo JM5	Formula Atlantic
1980	Argo JM6	Formula 3
1980	Argo JM7	Formula Super Vee
1981	Argo JM8	Formula 3
1981	Argo JM9	Formula Atlantic
1981	Argo JM10	Formula Super Vee
1982	Argo JM11	Formula Super Vee later converted into Formula Atlantic
1983	Argo JM12	Formula 3 / Formula Super Vee
1983	Argo JM14	Formula Ford 2000
1983	Argo JM15	CART
1983-1986	Argo JM16	GTP
1985	Argo JM17	Formula Ford 2000
1989	Argo JM18	Formula 3
1985-1986	Argo JM19	GTP/C2
1991	Argo JM20	C1
1991	Argo JM21	CN
1997	Argo P	WSC

== Sources ==
A1 Team Lebanon moves technical team for new season of A1GP
