= Royale RP40 =

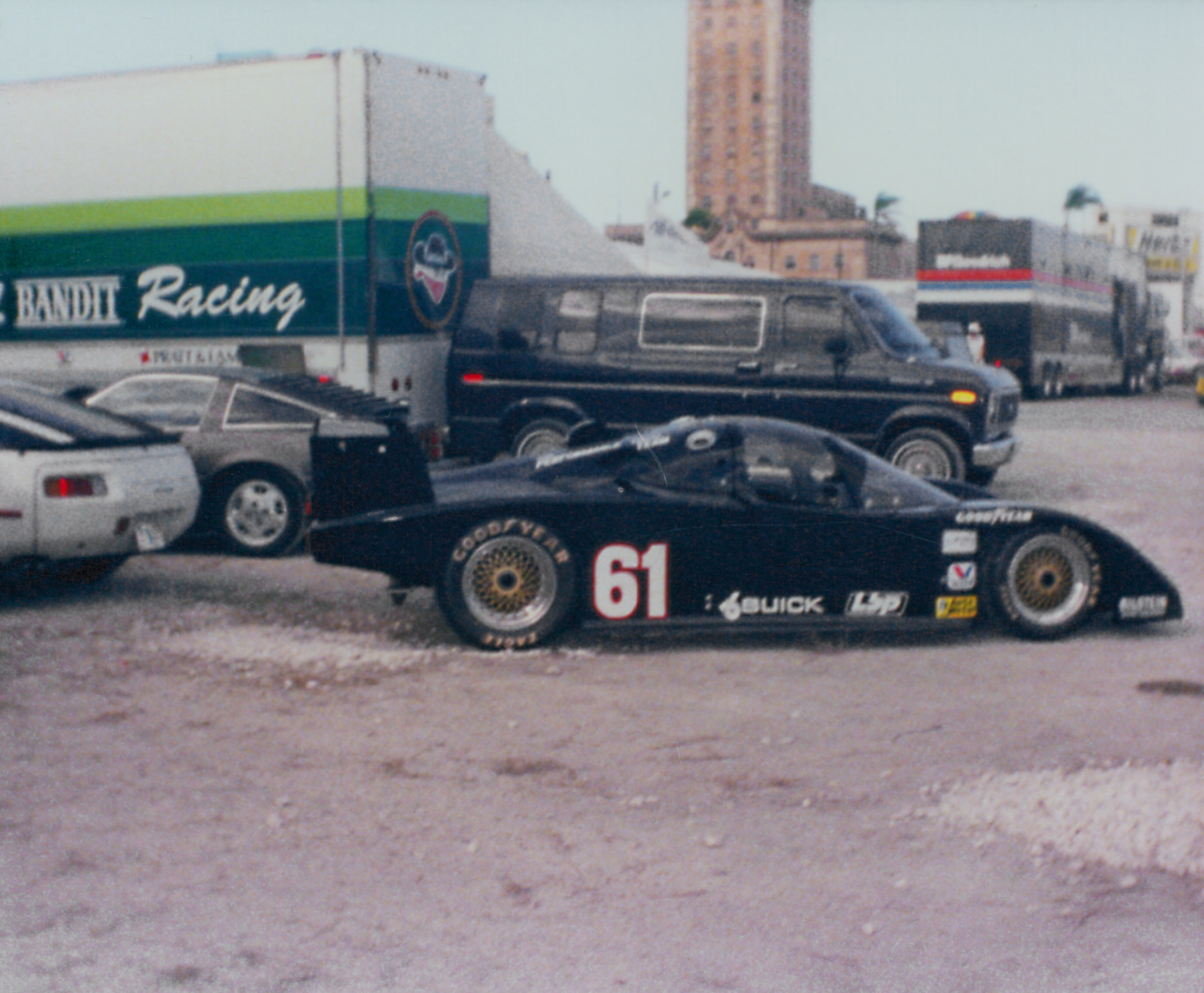
1987 Royal RP40-Buick

The Royale RP40 is an IMSA GTP Lights/Group C2 prototype race car, designed, developed and built by Royale Racing, for competition in the IMSA GT Championship, between 1985 and 1989. It one a single a race, at Miami, in 1986. Its powerplant was either a Buick V6 engine, or a Porsche flat-six engine. It also competed in the British Thundersports series, where it achieved a 3rd-place podium finish.
