= Argo JM16 =

Competition sports car

- Category: IMSA GTP Lights
- Constructor: Argo Racing Cars
- Designer: Jo Marquart

Technical specifications
- Chassis: Aluminum honeycomb monocoque covered in carbon fiber composite body
- Suspension: Double wishbones, pull-rod, coil springs over shock absorbers, anti-roll bar
- Axle track: 1,473 mm (58.0 in) (front); 1,372 mm (54.0 in) (rear)
- Wheelbase: 2,540 mm (100.0 in)
- Engine: Mazda/Buick/Ford-Cosworth 1.3–3.4 L (79.3–207.5 cu in) 2-rotor/V6/V8, naturally-aspirated, mid-engined
- Transmission: Hewland DGB 5-speed manual
- Power: 330–450 hp (250–340 kW)
- Weight: 750 kg (1,653.5 lb)

Competition history
Wins	Podiums
0 (11 class wins)	1

The Argo JM16 is an IMSA GTP Lights sports prototype race car, designed, developed and built by Argo Racing Cars, in 1984. It competed in the IMSA GT Championship sports car racing series between 1984 and 1993. It did not win any races; however, it did achieve 11 class victories, and one 3rd-place podium finish. It was powered by three different naturally aspirated engines; a Ford-Cosworth DFV Formula One engine, a Buick V6, and a Mazda 13B Wankel 2-rotor engine.
