= Argo JM19 =

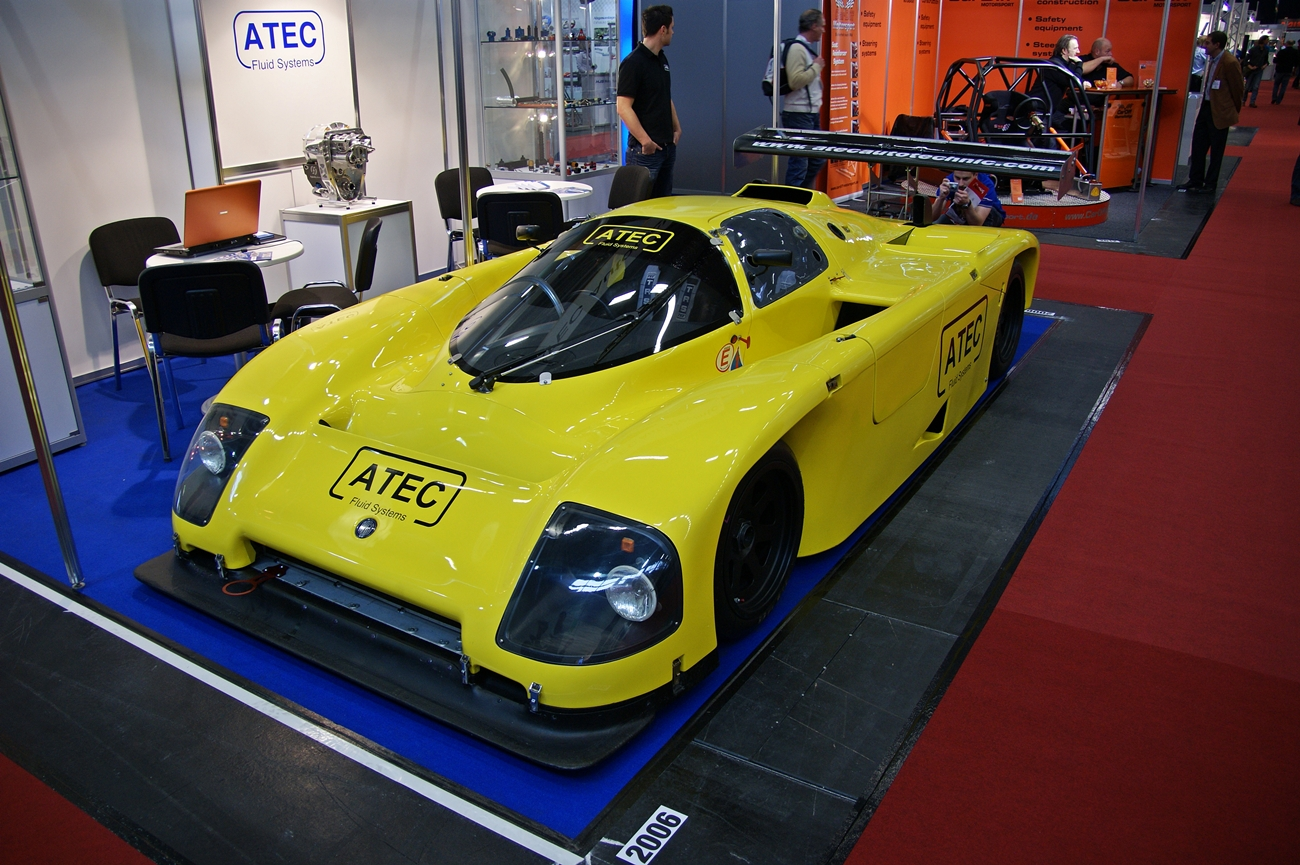
- JM19D
- Category: IMSA GTP Lights/Group C2
- Constructor: Argo Racing Cars
- Designers: Jo Marquart; Achim Storz

Technical specifications
- Chassis: Aluminum honeycomb monocoque covered in carbon fiber composite body
- Suspension: Double wishbones, coil springs over shock absorbers, anti-roll bar
- Length: 4,670 mm (183.9 in)
- Width: 1,920 mm (75.6 in)
- Height: 1,100 mm (43.3 in)
- Axle track: 1,480 mm (58.3 in) (front); 1,470 mm (57.9 in) (rear)
- Wheelbase: 2,670 mm (105.1 in)
- Engine: See table mid-engined
- Transmission: Hewland DGB 5-speed manual
- Weight: 700–707 kg (1,543.2–1,558.7 lb)

Competition history
Wins	Podiums
7	21

The Argo JM19, and its derivatives/evolutions, the Argo JM19C, and the Argo JM19D, are a series of IMSA GTP Lights/Group C2 sports prototype, designed, developed, and built by British constructor Argo Racing Cars, for the IMSA GT Championship, introduced in 1985.

Its use in sports car racing continued into the early 1990s. It won a total of 7 races, and scored a total of 21 podium finishes. It was powered by a number of different engines, including a Mazda 13B rotary engine, a Buick V6 turbo engine, a Ferrari V8 engine, and even a Ford-Cosworth DFL V8 Formula One-derived engine. It did, however, find most of its success when equipped with the Mazda-powered Wankel rotary engines.

== Gallery ==
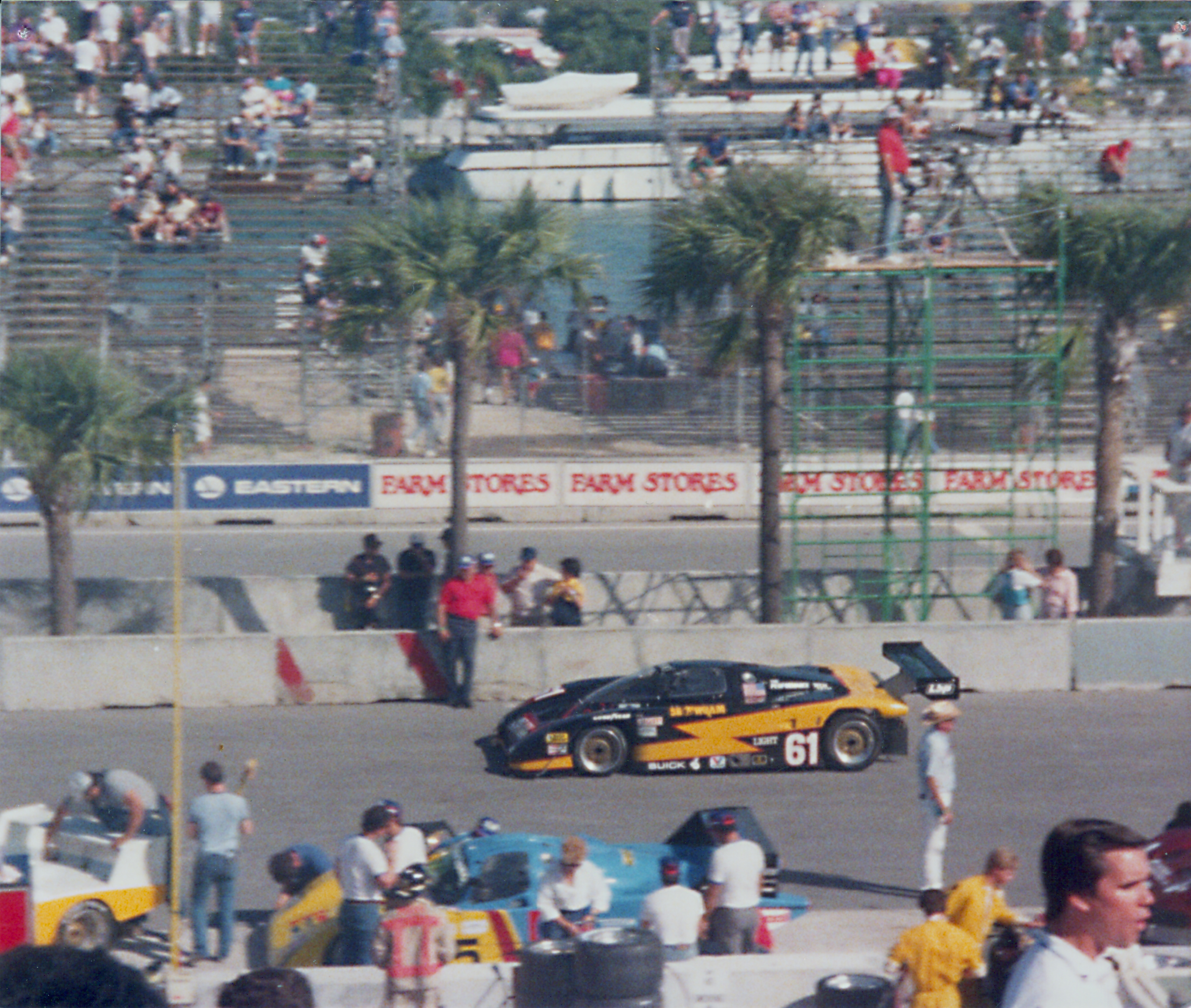
Argo JM19-Buick at the 1987 Miami Grand Prix

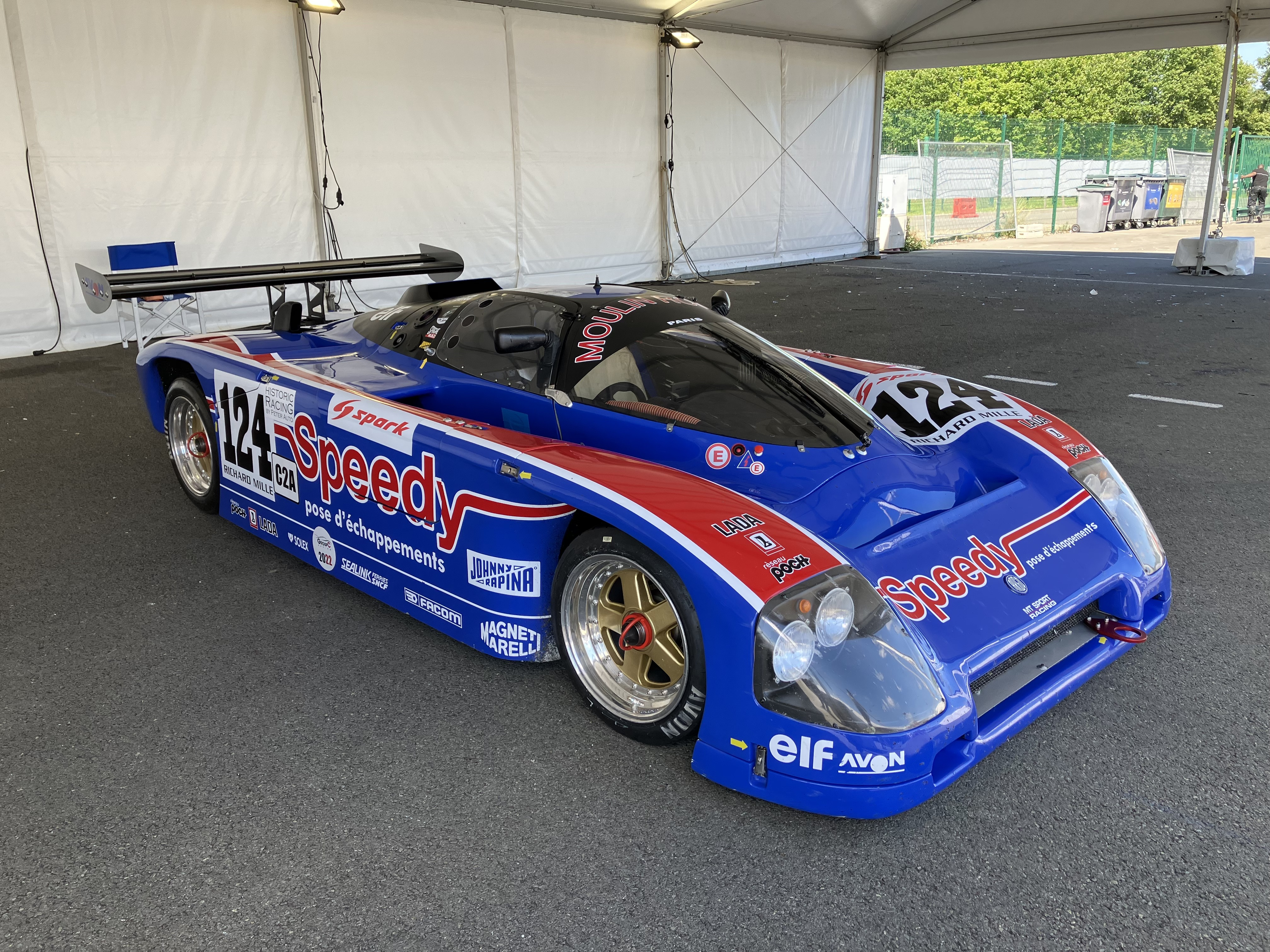
Argo JM19C at the 2022 Le Mans Classic

Argo JM19C at the 2026 Adelaide Motorsport Festival

== List of Engines used ==
Engine Make	Engine Model	Engine Type	Displacement	Horsepower	Torque	ref
Buick	Indy	V6	2,990 cubic centimetres (182.5 cubic inches)	420 horsepower (313 kilowatts)	500 newton-metres (369 pound-feet)	
Chevrolet	350	V8	5,733 cubic centimetres (349.8 cubic inches)	574 horsepower (428 kilowatts)	746 newton-metres (550 pound-feet)	
Ferrari	Dino 2.9	V8	2,927 cubic centimetres (178.6 cubic inches)	510 horsepower (380 kilowatts)	490 newton-metres (361 pound-feet)	
Ford-Cosworth	DFV	V8	2,993 cubic centimetres (182.6 cubic inches)	500 horsepower (373 kilowatts)	380 newton-metres (280 pound-feet)	
Ford-Cosworth	DFL	V8	3,955 cubic centimetres (241.3 cubic inches)	700 horsepower (522 kilowatts)	691 newton-metres (510 pound-feet)	
Judd	KV	V8	3,000 cubic centimetres (183.1 cubic inches)	520 horsepower (388 kilowatts)	410 newton-metres (302 pound-feet)	
Mazda	13J	2 Rotor	1,308 cubic centimetres (79.8 cubic inches)	325 horsepower (242 kilowatts)	375 newton-metres (277 pound-feet)	
Motori Moderni	615-90	V6	1,981 cubic centimetres (120.9 cubic inches)	780 horsepower (582 kilowatts)	710 newton-metres (524 pound-feet)	
Porsche	Type 930	F6	2,993 cubic centimetres (182.6 cubic inches)	465 horsepower (347 kilowatts)	400 newton-metres (295 pound-feet)	
Zakspeed	L4-1850	I4	1,850 cubic centimetres (112.9 cubic inches)	500 horsepower (373 kilowatts)	400 newton-metres (295 pound-feet)	
