= 1987 24 Hours of Le Mans =

55th 24 Hours of Le Mans endurance race

Previous: 1986	Next: 1988
Index: Races | Winners

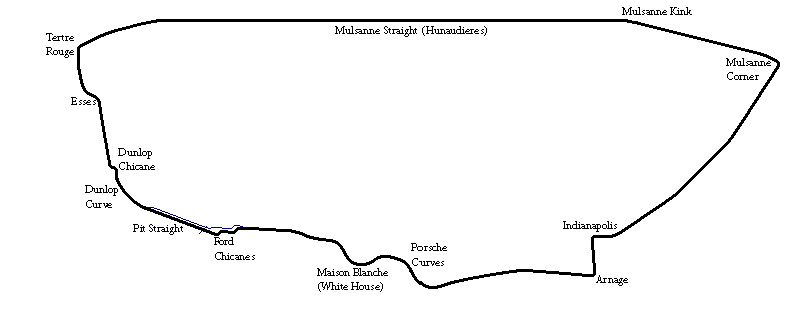
Le Mans in 1987

The 1987 24 Hours of Le Mans was the 55th Grand Prix of Endurance as well as the fifth round of the 1987 World Sports-Prototype Championship. It took place at the Circuit de la Sarthe, France, on the 13 and 14 June 1987. Jaguar was a strong contender, have won the four preceding rounds of the Championship. The Porsche works team had installed a new 3-litre engine into their 962s but their turbo engines would test their fuel economy.

Practice had been hampered by poor weather, and was notable for a big accident to Price Cobb who wrote off the third works Porsche. The rain continued into the race day and only eased as the race got underway. A chaotic first hour saw most teams diving into the pits to change off their rain-tyres. There was also a serious problem with the standard-grade fuel. Dropping from 105-octane, it played havoc with the engine-management systems of the Porsche turbo-engines, and the fancied teams from Joest and Kremer lost their cars with holed pistons. The second works Porsche was also afflicted, leaving just the single car hounded by the three Jaguars. Along with the Richard Lloyd car, these five cars jockeyed for position over the first quarter of the race, regularly swapping places. Rain returned as darkness fell, and a safety car came out when the Lloyd car caught fire at Mulsanne corner. Bell, Stuck and Holbert gradually pulled out a lead as the Jaguars had issues. Another safety came out when Win Percy had a huge accident on the Hunaudières straight. A tyre on his Jaguar blew out as he approached Mulsanne at over 350 kp/h. The car rolled and disintegrated, but Percy was able to walk away unhurt. The race resumed two hours later as dawn was breaking, removing any fuel concerns for the Porsches. The Jaguars both failed in the morning and suddenly the Porsche was out on its own, with a fifteen lap lead. From there it was a simple coast to the finish giving Bell, Holbert and Stuck consecutive victories. The small Obermaier Racing team had a reliable race and survived the attrition for a fine second place, with local owner-driver Yves Courage third in his Cougar. Gordon Spice had a similarly convincing victory in the C2 class in his Spice-Fiero, finishing sixth overall over the Ecurie Ecosse, who in turn won the Index for Energy Efficiency. The twelve classified finishers was the smallest number since 1970.

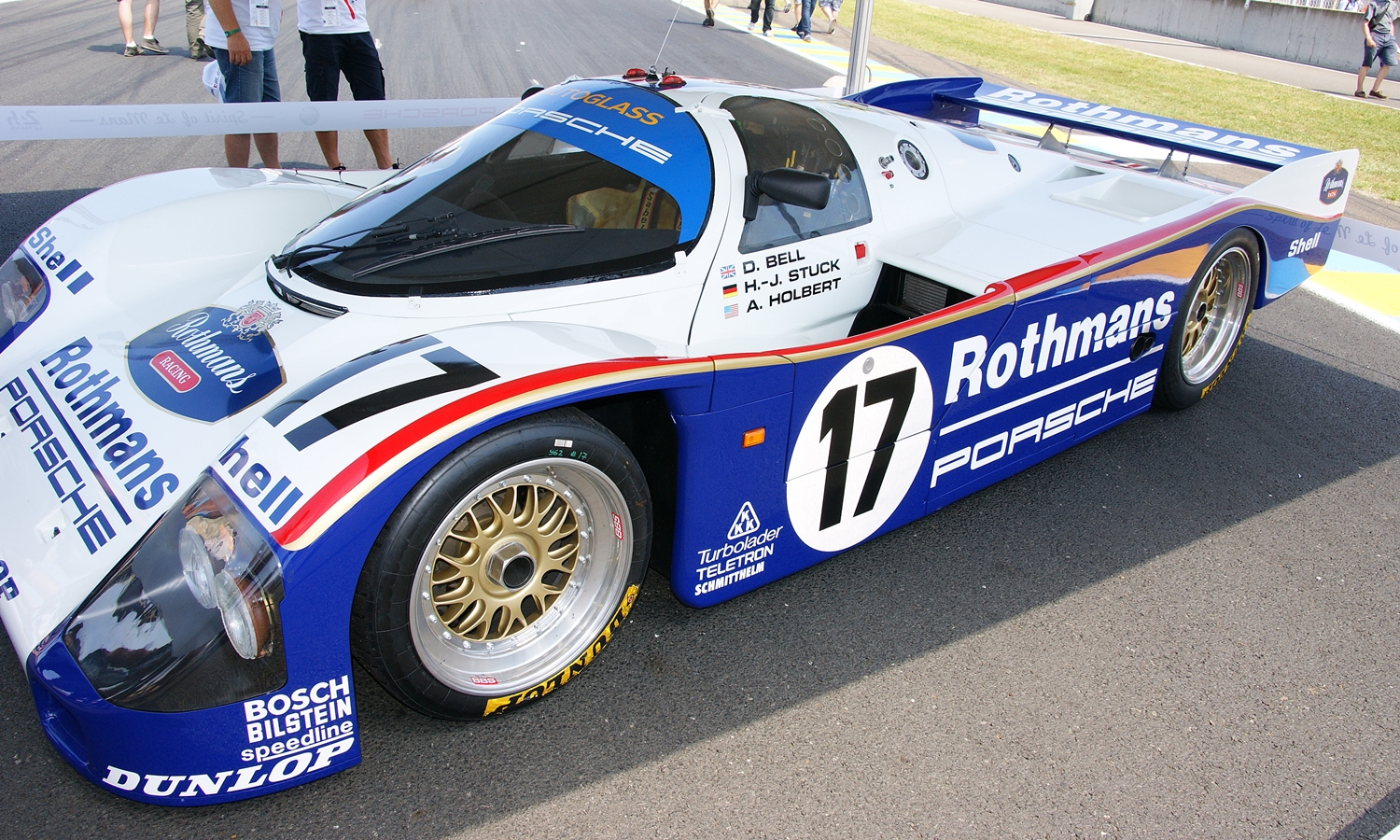
Winning works Porsche 962C of Bell/Stuck/Holbert

== Regulations ==
The FIA (Fédération Internationale de l'Automobile) aligned the Group C safety regulations with IMSA. The foot-pedals now had to be in a reinforced box and placed behind the front axle. Pushed by Jaguar and Walkinshaw, they also downgraded the fuel used from 105- to 98-octane and removing toluene and other special fuel additives. This would certainly impact the turbocharged Porsches to the level of around 20 bhp.

After the small adjustment to the Mulsanne corner last year, there was a much more significant change this year at the Dunlop Curve. The long right-hand bend was the first corner after the start-finish line and led up to the Esses section and Tertre Rouge. International motorcycle races used the shorter Bugatti Circuit. At the request of the FIM (Fédération Internationale de Motocyclisme) to reduce speeds approaching the Esses (where the Bugatti Circuit deviated away), the Dunlop Curve was tightened and a chicane installed just before the brow of the hill and the iconic Dunlop bridge. The net effect increased the overall circuit length by only 7 metres and increase lap-times by around 4–5 seconds. The département also resurfaced the section from the Indianapolis corner to the Porsche curves. Once again, the ACO (Automobile Club de l'Ouest) arranged a test day in mid-May. Of the prospective field of 50, only 23 cars arrived. Finally, the previous year's race had an English radio commentary broadcast locally on a limited basis. This year, Radio Le Mans was sponsored by the Silk Cut Jaguar team and Autosport magazine. It provided informed race-commentary for the legion of British fans onsite for the race, albeit not running right through the night, and would go on to become an established feature of the event.

== Entries ==
The five works manufacturers from the previous year returned to Le Mans, headlined by the showdown between Porsche and Jaguar. Indeed, Porsche could have been considered the underdogs after the dominant display by Jaguar, winning all four Championship races in the season to date. However, Porsche are masters of Le Mans and Jaguar still unproven over 24 hours of racing. The colloquial expression that "Le Mans is a British race held in France" was quite relevant, as 30-35000 British fans surged to the track for the big race, estimated to be around a quarter of the total spectators.

There were also three racing manufacturers each in C1 (WM, Sauber and Cougar) and C2 (Ecosse, Spice and ALD). The IMSA-GTP class would be a works contest between the Mazda rotaries and the Porsche four-wheel drive. With the dwindling field of GT interest and a full entry-list of prototypes, the ACO took no Group B entries. It was thus the first year with no cars homologated for production in the field since the class differentiation started in 1959.

Class	Quantity	Turbo/Rotary engines
Group C1	31 / 26	25 / 22
IMSA-GTP	4 / 3	4 / 3
Group C2	25 / 19	7 / 5
Total Entries	60 / 48	36 / 30

- Note: The first number is the number accepted, the second the number who started.

=== Group C1 ===
This year the Rothmans Porsche works team arrived with an improved car ahead, not yet released to their customer teams. Their 962 now sported a fully water-cooled 3-litre engine. The chassis also changed from a 16"/19" front-rear wheel diameter to 16" all round, to allow more air to the redesigned, and lower, rear-wing. Despite that, it was apparent that the width of the flat-six engine precluded optimal use of the air tunnels to create downforce, unlike the narrower V12 of the Jaguar. The newest chassis was assigned to team regulars Bob Wollek and Jochen Mass. Lead drivers Derek Bell and Hans-Joachim Stuck ("BEST"), along with Al Holbert (the team who had won the year before) had a 1-year old chassis after Stuck had wrecked their new car in pre-race testing. The third car, a 1985-chassis that had already done two Le Mans, was given to Vern Schuppan, American Price Cobb and Dutch-Canadian Kees Nierop.

Once again, Porsche was well-represented by strong, professional customer teams. With a dozen of the 75x 962s built in the field now, many teams were now making their own modifications to bodyshell, chassis and components. They still had the standard 2.85-litre engines, now capable of 640 bhp. Brun Motorsport, having won the 1986 Teams Championship carried the Number 1, and they had three 962s present. This year team principal Walter Brun stepped aside from driving duties, with his lead car with an all-French line-up led by Pierre de Thoisy. Season regulars Oscar Larrauri and Jésus Pareja, who had finished second last year, had the #2 car, while the third had the all-Canadian crew Bill Adam/Scott Goodyear/Richard Spenard, and was fitted with a TV camera.

With reduced support from the factory, four of the chassis (both Kremers, a Joest and a Brun car) were built in Britain by John Thomson's TC Prototypes, with a lightweight honeycomb composite frame. Both Joest and Kremer built their own engines. Kremer also fitted larger wheel-arches to accommodate their 19" Yokohama tyres. The 2.85-litre engines now put out 640 bhp. Kremer's lead drivers Volker Weidler and Kris Nissen had finished second at Jerez, and were joined by Kunimitsu Takahashi. In contrast, Joest Racing had two new crews for this race: regular team driver Stanley Dickens had veteran Hurley Haywood and Frank Jelinski (who had raced for Brun earlier in the season). Richard Lloyd's Liqui Moly team (now called Britten-Lloyd Racing) had done a lot of innovative work with their new chassis, designed by Nigel Stroud. So much so that it was renamed the 962C GTi, fitting adjustable suspension and moveable wings onto a honeycomb-composite chassis. Tyrrell F1 driver Dr Jonathon Palmer was the regular driver for the team and was joined by James Weaver and Pierre Petit. The other Porsche 962 was from the smaller Obermaier Racing team, now co-sponsored by Primagaz. It was the first event for Jürgen Lässig's brand-new 962C, and he was joined by Pierre Yver (who brought the Primagaz money) and Bernard de Dryver.

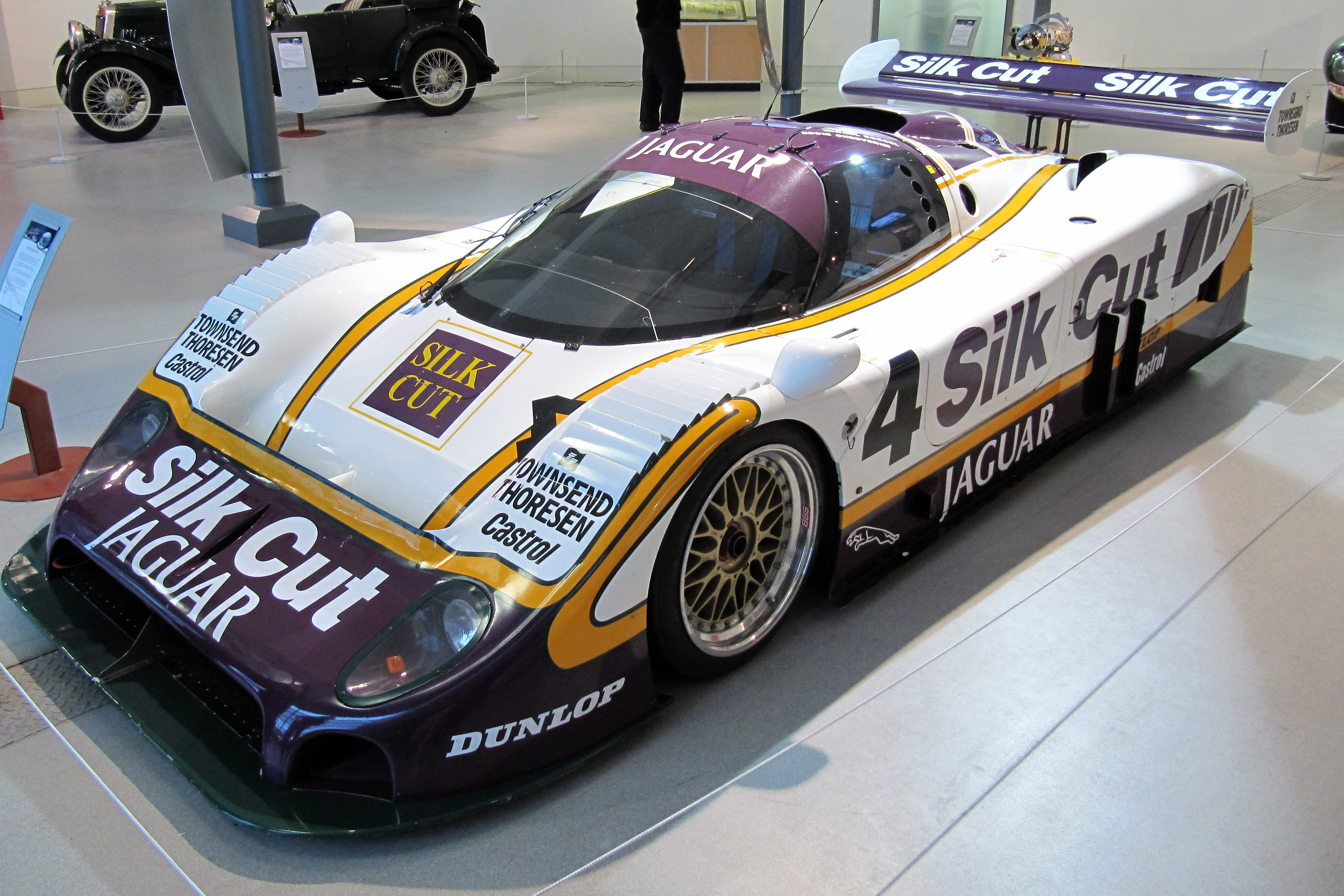
Jaguar XJR-8

Jaguar Cars arrived with Tony Southgate's new design: the XJR-8. The engineers at the workshops of Tom Walkinshaw Racing made over 60 modifications. The fuelling and cooling systems were overhauled. Revised aerodynamics gave greater downforce from the new undertray, and to take on the long straights the –LM version had a new nose and low rear wing. The cumulative effect was to make the cars far more reliable. They came in just a kilo over the 850 kg minimum weight. The V12 SOHC engine was increased to 7.0 litres and TWR's engine-specialist, Allan Scott, could tune it up to 720 bhp, giving a top speed of 355 kp/h (220 mph). To cope with the increasing downforce, their tyre-supplier Dunlop developed special tyres laced with kevlar to hold their shape under the loads. The regular season driver-combinations were Eddie Cheever/Raul Boesel and Jan Lammers/John Watson. The cars were completed in February and the team did extensive winter testing at Paul Ricard. In a dominant display, Jaguar had won all four rounds of the season to date, with the two driving pairs sharing them two apiece. The 1-2 finish at their home race at Silverstone cemented the belief in the minds of British fans that this would be the year of success. For Le Mans, TWR stalwart Win Percy joined the latter pair as a co-driver, while a third car was entered driven for Dane John Nielsen and F1 driver Martin Brundle.

After an indifferent year with the C8, Sauber returned with its new model, the C9. A new monocoque chassis and improved aerodynamics gave it almost twice as much downforce as before. With an improved engine-management system, the Mercedes-Benz M117 engine was now 20 kg lighter and put out 650 bhp, or 800 bhp in qualifying trim. Combined with a tougher Hewland gearbox, it was a far more competitive package, qualifying second on debut at Silverstone and leading for a time. Once again, they were led by 4-time winner Henri Pescarolo, with Mike Thackwell and Hideki Okada. Thackwell was also cross-entered with the second car, supporting Scottish F1 driver Johnny, Earl Dumfries and American Chip Ganassi. Peter Sauber also sold one of his C8 cars to French privateer Noël del Bello, who had stepped up from running his Tiga in the C2 class.

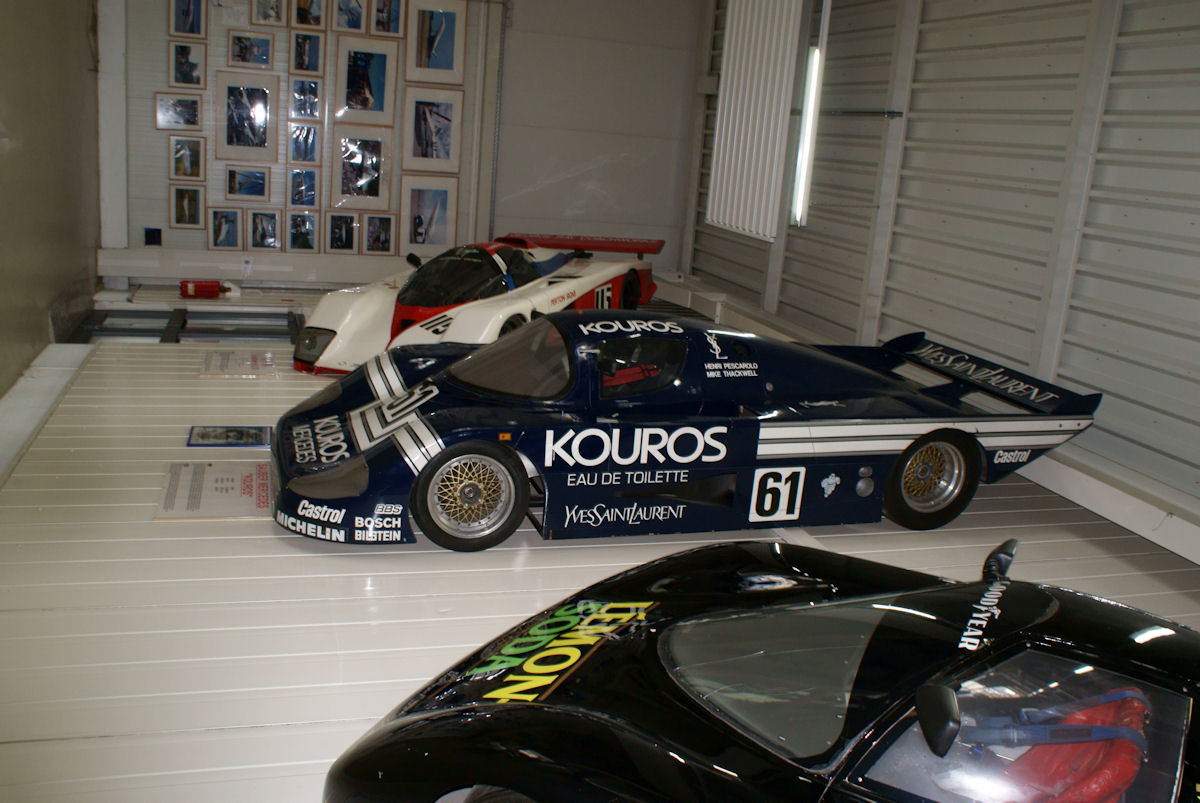
Sauber C9

After the debacle at the 1986 race, Nissan returned to Le Mans, its only race this year outside of the Japanese Championship. The new March 87G chassis (designed by Gordon Coppuck) was now fitted with a purpose-built racing Nissan engine. The 3.0-litre DOHC twin-turbo V8 could produce 700 bhp. The chassis was an aluminium honeycomb monocoque with a Kevlar/carbon-fibre bodyshell, the aerodynamic effect was to reduce drag by 20% over the R86V despite a weight-gain. This year, the two cars both had Japanese driving combinations: Hoshino and Matsumoto were together again, with Endurance Champion Kenji Takahashi. The second car had Masahiro Hasemi/Takao Wada/Aguri Suzuki. One of the older R86V cars was co-entered by two Japanese teams, Team LeMans and Italya Sport team, and fitted with a European line-up of Anders Olofsson/Alain Ferté/Patrick Gonin. In the close-season, Toyota were committed to sports-car racing and brought their racing division in-house, with TOM'S Racing designated the works team, with other staff brought in from Dome including chief designer Masahiro Ohkuni. The resultant Toyota 87C picked up the naming sequence from the Dome cars. The 2.1-litre turbo engine was derived from the 3S engine in the Toyota Celica. Although it could put out 680 bhp, the car lacked top-end speed, only reaching 335 kp/h (210 mph). At the test weekend its times only put it amongst the fastest C2 cars. Former F1 World Champion Alan Jones teamed up with Geoff Lees/Eje Elgh. Masanori Sekiya arrived with his fiancé and they got married during the race-week. He would be driving the second car with Kaoru Hoshino and Tiff Needell.

As always, the small WM Secateva team had its focus solely on Le Mans. The new P87 had been two years in gestation with a lower, wider body and a longer wheelbase. The shape was refined by testing in the St Cyr wind tunnel. The V6 Peugeot engine was developed further, with improved KKK (Kühnle, Kopp & Kausch) turbos, each with their own intercooler now. It raced at 600 bhp but could be wound up to 900 bhp for qualifying. The car was targeted to be the first to reach 400 kp/h on the Mulsanne straight. However, issues stopped it doing a full lap at the test weekend. Leading up to race-week they got special dispensation to use the new, unopened, section of the A26 autoroute where François Migault hit 415 kp/h (260 mph). Team principal Roger Dorchy would race the P87 with Philippe Gache/Dominique Delestre, while Migault raced the older P86 with team regulars Jean-Daniel Raulet/Pascal Pessiot.

As well as supporting Hans Obermaier's Porsche, Primagaz continued their support of Le Mans local constructor Yves Courage. With the new structure regulations, Courage rebuilt his C12 as the new C20. It was now fitted with the bigger Porsche 2.8-litre twin-turbo engine of the 962. It also had revised suspension, braking and cooling. Despite being 18 kg heavier, the Courage was the fastest car at the test-weekend, reaching 370 kp/h (230 mph) on the Mulsanne Straight. Once again, Courage drove himself alongside Pierre-Henri Raphanel and Hervé Regout. Jean-Philippe Grand's Graff Racing brought its Rondeau M482 to Le Mans for the fifth, and final, time as the sole representative of the marque. It was modified to meet the new safety regulations and Grand raced himself, along with Jacques Terrien and motocross champion Gaston Rahier.

=== Group C2 ===
Ecurie Ecosse had won a closely fought C2 Teams Championship in 1986. Expectations were high for the race, 30 years since the original team's last Le Mans victory. The team entered two cars, which were now fitted with Cosworth DFLs, after Rover withdrew its free engine-supply at the end of the last year. The new C287 won its class on debut at the Silverstone round. It was recorded as the fastest C2 on the Hunaudières Straight, reaching 345 kp/h (215 mph). Ray Mallock and David Leslie were joined by former teammate Marc Duez. The re-engined C286 had Mike Wilds driving with Americans Delano and Petery. Spice Engineering was developing their new lightweight SE87C for this, but after the test weekend, chose instead to carry on running the reliable SE86C with its DFL Cosworth prepared by John Nicholson. Together Gordon Spice and new co-driver Fermin Velez had won three of the four rounds of the season, including a fourth overall at Jerez. They were joined at Le Mans by Philippe de Henning who brought sponsorship from the Church of Scientology. Chamberlain Engineering had fitted their SE86C with a 1.9-litre Hart engine with its Holset turbo.

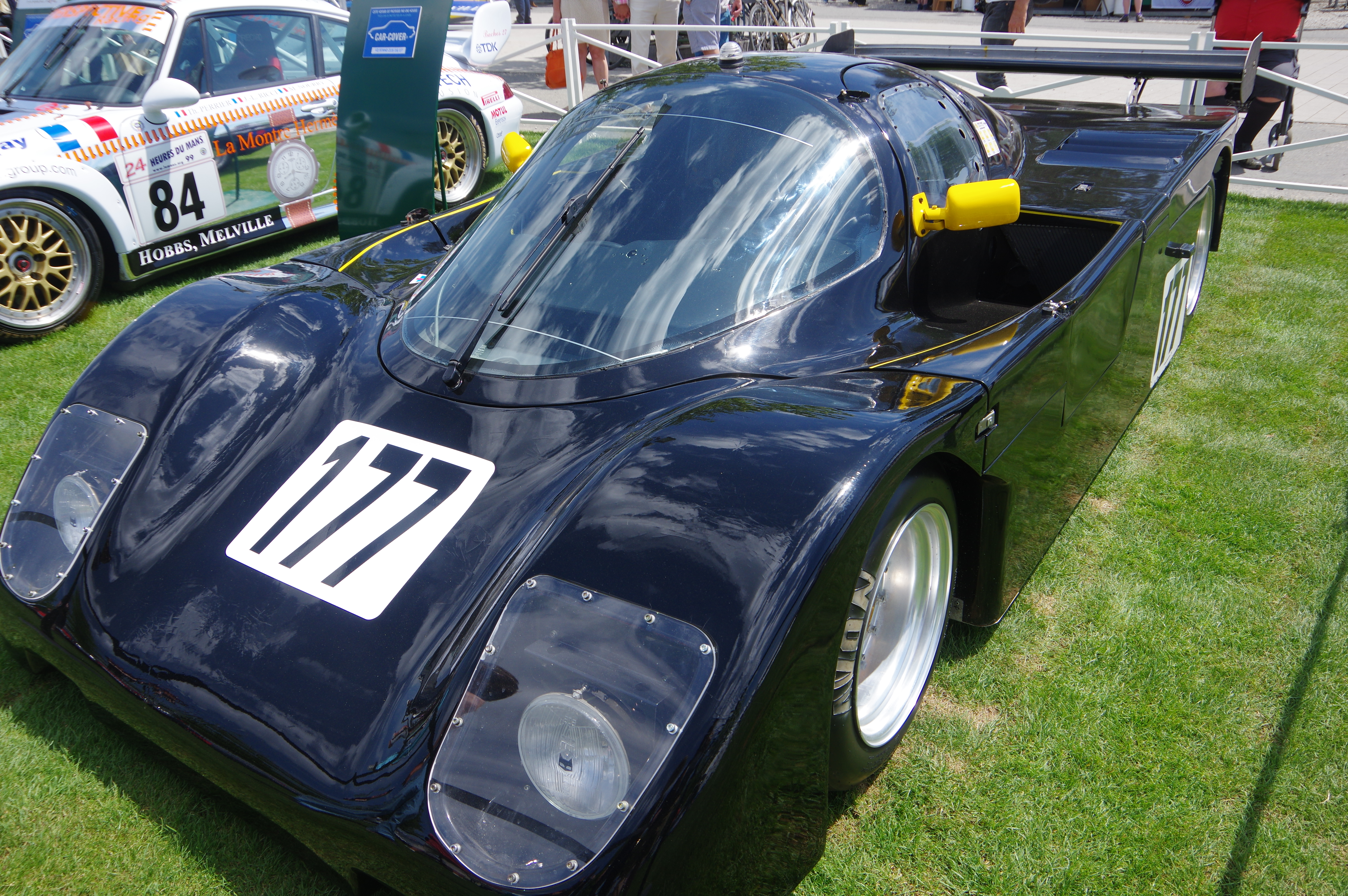
ALD 03

This year, the most numerous name in the C2 class was Tiga, which had seven cars on the grid, fitted with five different engines. Four were the new GC287 model. Fastest was that of the Charles Ivey team (who had previously run Porsche GTs at Le Mans). They had managed to squeeze the 2.65-litre twin-turbo engine of the Porsche 956 in the back. It was wound down to 0.8-bar of boost but still put out 500 bhp. It would be driven by Moroccan Max Cohen-Olivar with Brits John Cooper and Tom Dodd-Noble. Duncan Bain and Neil Crang had formed the Dune Motorsport team and fitted their GC287 with the 3-litre, 380 bhp, Rover V6 engine, from the MG rally-car. Dane Thorkild Thyrring used the turbocharged Cosworth BDT rally engine, tuned by Brian Hart to put out 600 bhp. Whereas, Roy Baker had swapped out his BDT to go with the more reliable Cosworth DFL, updating his GC286 to the new specs. After the unpleasant experience with Nissan the previous year, Keith Greene had formed a new team with Dave Prewitt. GP Motorsport ran in conjunction with Anglo-Greek Costas Los' team, Cosmik Racing, also running a G287 with the DFL.

The nature of the C2 class attracted privateers and keen amateurs and a number filled out the grids. French driver-constructors Louis Descartes and Jacques Heuclin had started the season with their ALD 02 but arrived at Le Mans with the new ALD 03 model. Originally to have a new, turbocharged 1.8-litre Audi S4 engine, they had swapped back to their regular BMW 3.5-litre after the Audi had proven troublesome. The older ALD 02 (with BMW engine) was also brought along. John Bartlett and Robin Donovan brought the Bardon DB1 back after not qualifying the previous year. It had a number of improvements to the rear that improved its top speed significantly up to 285 kp/h (175 mph). Donovan had pay-drivers Tim Lee-Davey and Raymond Boutinard with him.

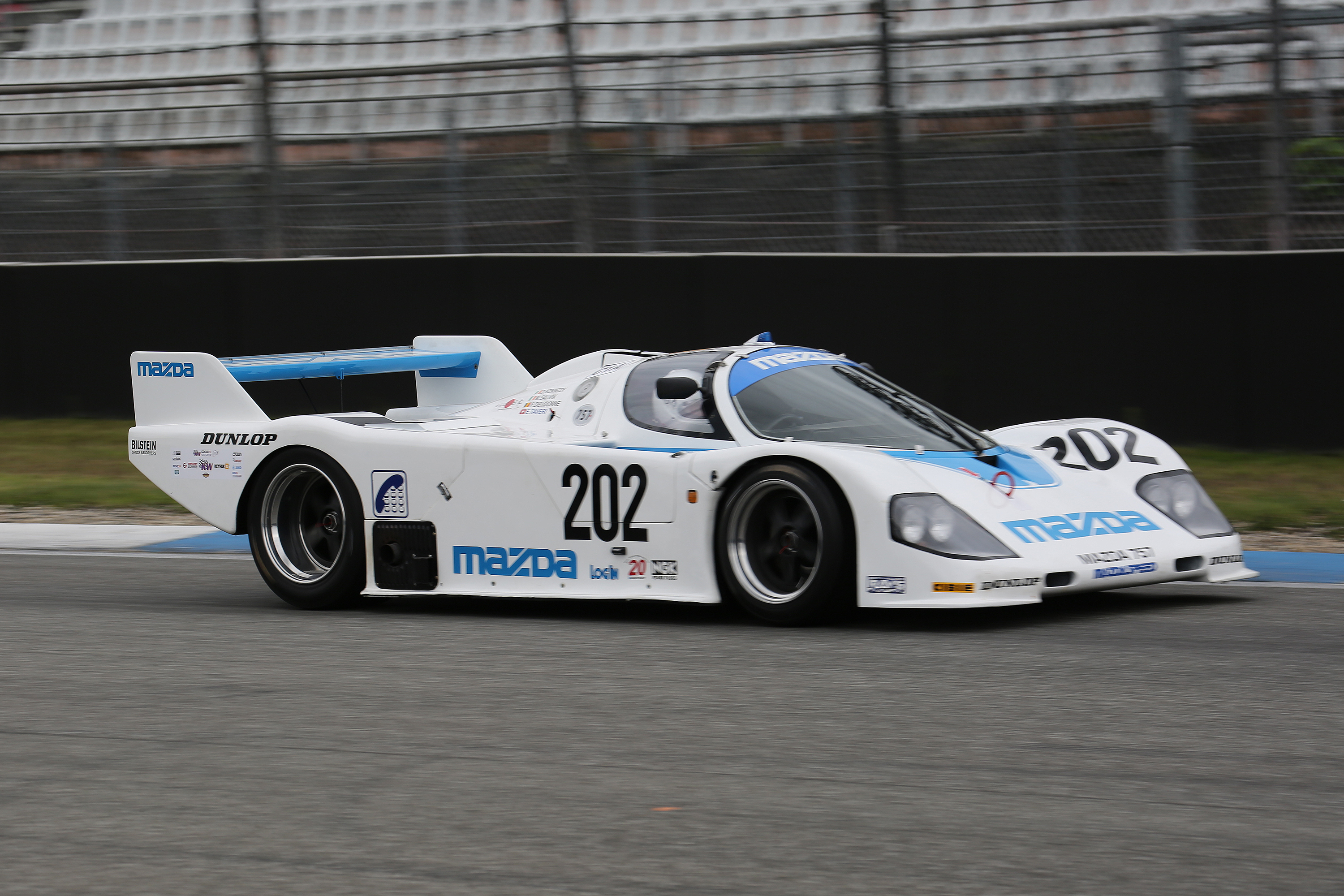
Mazda 757

Royale Racing had been successful in the lower levels of single-seater racing, before changing up to Sport Cars. They uprated Argo cars for the IMSA series then released one of their last cars, the RP40, for C2. Olindo Iacobelli raced it, supported by Chamberlain Engineering. Norwegian Rallycross champion Martin Schanche sold his JM19 to German Peter Fritsch who got Dahm Cars to fit a heavy Porsche GT-turbo engine. Schanche, meanwhile, had bought a new JM19 and put in a more powerful Zakspeed engine, now 1850cc and KKK-turbo. Very fast in the early-season races, he ran with regular teammate Will Hoy, as well as Robin Smith. Roland Bassaler had his SHS C6 at its fourth Le Mans; Luigi Taverna returned with his 3-year old Alba. Perhaps the most unusual entry was from José Thibault, who arrived with an old Chevron B36 fitted with enclosed bodyshell with a central fin, designed by the Sthemo team. With an equally old 2.1-litre ROC-Talbot turbo, it was so light it needed ballast to get it up to the 850 kg minimum.

=== IMSA-GTP ===
Mazdaspeed continued its program in the IMSA-GTP class. The Mazda 757 was further developed and improved, still lighter than all the C1 cars. They had the same six drivers as the previous year, with the Japanese works drivers Terada/Yorino/Katayama in one and Kennedy/Dieudonné/Galvin in the other. The FIA had closed the Group B category at the end of 1986. So this year, the Porsche works team entered their 4-wheel drive Porsche 961 in the IMSA-GTP Class, after it had already been raced at Daytona. Rally-driver René Metge would again drive the car, this time partnered by GT veteran Claude Haldi (in his 20th consecutive Le Mans start).

== Practice and Qualifying ==
The two days of qualifying were hampered by intermittent showers. It was the Porsche work team that, once again, judged its runs best. On the first day, Stuck put in a time 3:21.1 (over 6 seconds slower than his 1985 record time) only to be beaten minutes later by his teammate Wollek by four-hundredths of a second. However, the shine was taken their performance with a big accident to their third car. Price Cobb hit oil at the Porsche Curves and went into multiple spins. The car went over the guardrail and burst into flames. Price was unable to find the button for the onboard extinguisher in the fire, and was lucky to emerge with only singed eyebrows. The car was out and the drivers redistributed: Nierop joined the 961 crew, with whom he had raced at Daytona; Schuppan teamed up with the Wollek/Mass car. Cobb himself went to the Richard Lloyd car, substituting for the inexperienced Pierre Petit. After an average first day, the Jaguars were up to speed on the next, all in the 3:24s – collecting 3rd, 4th and 5th on the grid, led by the Cheever/Boesel car. The Cougar had also lost time on the first day (ignition problems) but Raphanel finally got a quick lap for 6th (3:26.1). The Saubers had been 3rd and 4th behind the Porsches on the first day, but ended up 7th and 8th. The top-10 was rounded out by the best of the customer Porsche teams: Joest #7 (3:27.5) and the Britten-Lloyd car. Palmer had tried to qualify with a special 3.2-litre engine but it blew up on the first lap so they had to change it back.

There were high expectations for the superfast WM, but fans were disappointed as the P87 suffered turbo-boost, and then ignition, problems. They only managed to qualify 21st (3:38.7), six seconds behind the sister car, in 13th. This year, the works Japanese cars were closer to the Porsches, all qualifying in the top-20. However, even the quickest (the Toyota of Jones/Less/Elgh) was thirteen seconds back, just behind the WM, in 14th (3:34.5). it was ten seconds faster than their times the year before, so the team remained hopeful. The three GTP cars qualified within three seconds of each other, with the Japanese-driven Mazda leading in 27th (3:45.6).

In C2, the Spice-Fieros set the pace with Nick Adams in the Chamberlain car comfortably setting the fastest time with a 3:40.0 (22nd). The works car was second 3:42.3 (25th) but had to rebuild the rear end after Velez spun on oil and crashed. They, in turn, were well ahead of the Tigas – the fastest being the Charles Ivey car with its Porsche turbo (3:50.3 for 30th). In GTP, the three cars qualified in the mid-field, with the European-Mazda 27th (3:45.6), the other just behind in 28th (3:47.5) with the Porsche 31st (3:50.9). The last car on the grid was the Chevron hybrid, with a distant 4:14.3.

== Race ==
=== Start ===
This year the honorary starter was Gerald Lascelles, chairman of the British Racing Drivers' Club. The day had started with occasional showers but by the time the cars set off on their pace-lap it had cleared and the circuit was drying. In a chaotic first hour, a number of cars were pitting. Aside from changing from wet or intermediate tyres to slicks as the track dried (Lammers & Palmer pitted after the first lap), the standard fuel mix was burning out their pistons as the Bosch engine-management computers ran the mixture too rich for the engines to cope with. Both the highly fancied Joest cars were in the pits and retired within 7 laps, as was Kris Nissen in his Kremer car. Even the works team was not immune, with the pole-sitting Wollek/Mass/Schuppan car out after 16 laps, right on the hour, with the same issue. This all contrived to blow the race wide open, as the other Porsche teams scrambled to correct their ECUs to compensate. The Rothmans Porsche team was now down to one car with 23 hours to go, and under pressure from all three Jaguars. As the sun came out, it was the Jaguar of Nielsen locked in a thrilling tussle with Stuck. It was briefly curtailed when the safety cars were brought after two separate accidents: when Schäfer somersaulted the Brun Porsche over the barriers at the Porsche Curves, and Heinrich beached the Chevron on the racing line at Arnage. Upon resumption of racing there was nothing between the top five and as twilight fell, the rain returned. Alan Jones did not make the first stop – a misunderstanding on the size the Toyota's reserve tank saw him run out of fuel. At the first fuel-stop, Hasemi's Nissan had a sudden flash-fire, costing 20 minutes in clean-up. They lost another 3 hours with electrical problems during the night, before finally retiring in the early morning. It was followed soon after by its stablemate, hobbled by engine issues.

The Sauber-Mercedes team had a dismal race: the Dumfries/Ganassi car had been running sixth after the second hour. Dumfries set the fastest lap of the race in the third hour. He had finally handed over to Ganassi, but then only ten minutes into his stint the gearbox packed up. The Pescarolo/Thackwell car had been delayed early on with an intermittent engine system, and then pushed hard making up the lost time. Pescarolo had just got back into the top-dozen in the 5th hour when the Sauber stopped out on the circuit with a seized universal joint. That would sink most drivers but Pescarolo, a veteran of 20 Le Mans, set to work with his on-board tools fashioning a repair. After two hours, he got mobile and limped back to the pits to find the crew were packing up. Soon after 11pm they were back in the race, but to no avail when a puncture at 4.30am shredded the rear bodywork and damaged the suspension irreparably. After three hours, the Porsche was leading the Brundle/Nielsen Jaguar by barely a car's length. This gradually stretched out, until the Jaguars fought back and both Brundle and Watson got past to lead for three hours. Not far behind was the other Jaguar and the Palmer/Weaver/Cobb BLR Porsche. These five pulled away from the rest of the field and at the 6-hour mark, the Obermaier Porsche was 6th, followed by the Mazda, the Cougar, the C2-leading Ecosse with the Porsche 961 rounding out the top-10.

The first to crack was the Jaguar of Cheever which had a puncture them a broken throttle-link as dusk fell. These contributed to dropping the car two laps off the lead. At the same time, the drizzle returned making it very difficult for the drivers with the setting sun and slick circuit. In C2, the very quick Chamberlain Spice had pitted with a water leak after only half an hour. It was only after several more stops costing an hour that the fault was traced to a fault in the cooling system. This left the Spice/Velez car duelling with the Ecosse. They had been running 11th and 12th after two hours and kept advancing. When the former was delayed by a water-leak, the Scottish team were able to build a lead over them.

=== Night ===
The Goodyears on the BLR Porsche were not as effective in the wet as the Jaguars' Dunlops and they slipped back, passed by the recovering Cheever. It was only when a second shower swept the track that Stuck was able to eke out a bit of a lead. The race then went under safety car a second time, when the BLR Porsche suffered a broken oil-line and caught fire at Mulsanne corner soon after midnight. Weaver was only on his second out-lap after a pit-stop and although the car was burnt out, he got out unscathed. By 1am, the works Porsche had built a 3-minute lead over of the Jaguars. Their order had been changed when the Watson/Lammers car lost time when its engine cover flew off going down Hunaudières, and dropping them to fourth. With the core of the customer Porsches now retired, it was the Obermaier Porsche now up in fifth, ahead of its co-sponsored cousin, the Primagaz Courage. The attrition was so severe that the C2-leading Ecosse was running smoothly in 8th overall, with the Spice/Velez car not far behind in 10th.

The World Champion Brun Motorsport team had a wretched race, losing all three cars before half-time. After Schäfer had planted his car in the barriers early on, de Thoisy also went off at midnight. Finally, two hours later the Canadian entry faltered with a water leak. With all the tribulations during the night, the Ecosse and Spice had got in the top-10 overall. The scrap continued throughout the night and into the morning, with the Spice finally catching up soon after 9am when the Ecosse had exhaust problems.

At 2.45am, Win Percy had a massive accident in his Jaguar. He had only been in the car for six laps when a tyre blew out on him at over 350 kp/h (220 mph), coming over the hump at the kink approaching Mulsanne. The Jaguar slammed in the right-hand barriers, did several somersaults scraping the roadside trees and disintegrated, ending up 300 metres beyond the corner. With his open-faced helmet, Percy was skating upside-down along the road. Amazingly, he got out the wreck unhurt. Car designer Tony Southgate was justifiably proud that the cockpit was left intact and not a drop of fuel from the nearly-full tank had been spilled. Torn-up barriers and debris strewn all over the track meant a third safety period for nearly two hours. The length of the safety period was sufficient to relieve any fuel-consumption concerns for the leading Porsche, negating the big advantage the Jaguars had over it. There was a scare when the Porsche's battery lost charge behind the pace-car and had to be changed. Less fortunate was Mike Wilds, whose Ecosse's battery failed behind the pace-car stranding him out on the circuit.

=== Morning ===
It was dawn before the green flags came out again. At this time, the works Porsche and the two Jaguars were still on the same lap. Around 7am, Boesel went off at Arnage and had to pit for a new nose-section. Then Brundle retired his car from second place at 7.45am with water dripping from a cracked cylinder-head. Around 9am, "BEST" were leading, having done 250 laps. The Obermaier Porsche was second (235), a lap ahead of Cheever/Boesel. With the Jaguar retirement, the Cougar inherited 4th (231 – though yet to overtake them on the track) with the Kremer Porsche next (230). The C2-class battle continued with the Ecosse 6th (222), a lap ahead of the Spice and the GTP-leading Mazda in 8th (218 laps). A wretched couple of hours for Jaguar continued with the Cheever/Boesel car: being delayed by fuel issues, loose rear bodywork and then a tired Cheever mistakenly grabbed reverse gear, stripping off teeth and firing them through the casing. Replacing the gearbox took forty minutes and dropped them down to fifth place. Later, Boesel coasted to a stop out on the circuit. He hooked up the auxiliary power and was able to get going. However, he did not affix the engine cover properly and it blew off on the return to the pits, damaging the rear-wing.

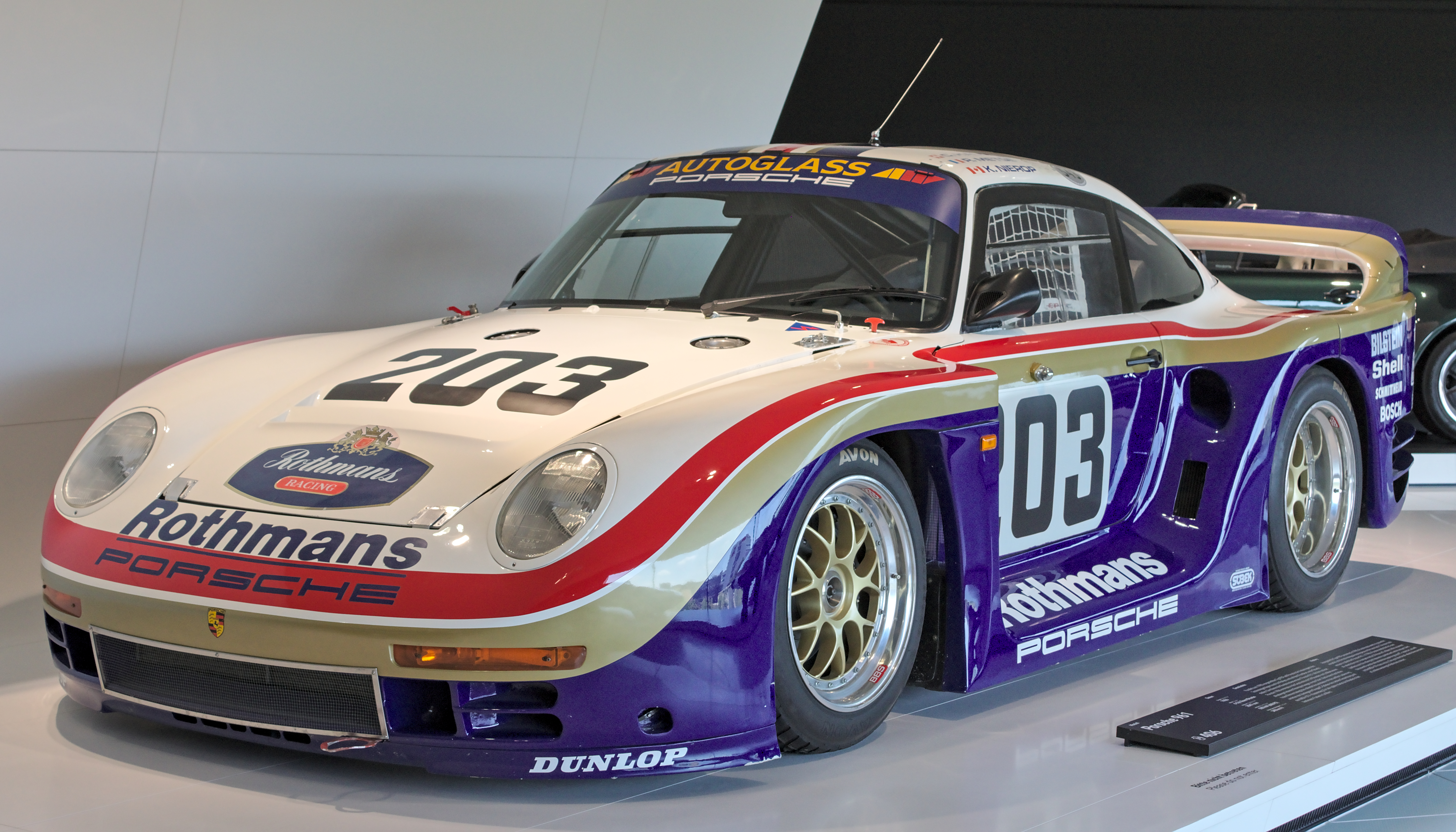
The restored Porsche 961

The quick demise of the Jaguar team left no-one else to seriously challenge the works Porsche. Over the next three hours, the lead built up to sixteen laps. The fancied customer Porsches had been decimated early on with their fuel issues. The Japanese teams were again a disappointment. Both of the Toyotas were out before nightfall. The Nissans fared a bit better, with the Takahashi/Matsumoto/Hoshino car getting into the top ten late in the night, until delayed and finally retired with a broken gearbox. The other two were already out with engine failures.

After a delay overnight, the Porsche 961 had climbed back into the top-dozen by morning, well behind the remaining Mazda running 9th. Then at 10am, Nierop crashed on the approach to Indianapolis when he mistakenly downshifted to second gear instead of fourth. The car spun and backed into the guardrail hard. He was able to get going again, until team manager Peter Falk radioed him to park and get out immediately. Unseen by the driver, but picked up by the TV coverage, the savaged rear bodywork had cut a turbo exhaust and started a serious fire. Nierop got out safely, but unfortunately had parked too far from fire posts and the car went up in flames. The car would later be recovered and fully restored for museum display.

=== Finish and post-race ===
The Rothmans Porsche won the race with the biggest winning margin of the decade, of 20 laps (260 km). It was Bell and Holbert's fourth consecutive 24-hour victory, having also achieved the rare double of both the Daytona and Le Mans in the same year. The small Obermaier team finished second, having held their position for six hours following the retirement of their last Jaguar. The Primagaz-sponsored Cougar team finished third, despite almost running out of fuel and getting a broken CV-joint within coasting distance of the pits. Yves Courage did his only driving-stint of the race to bring his car across the finish line.

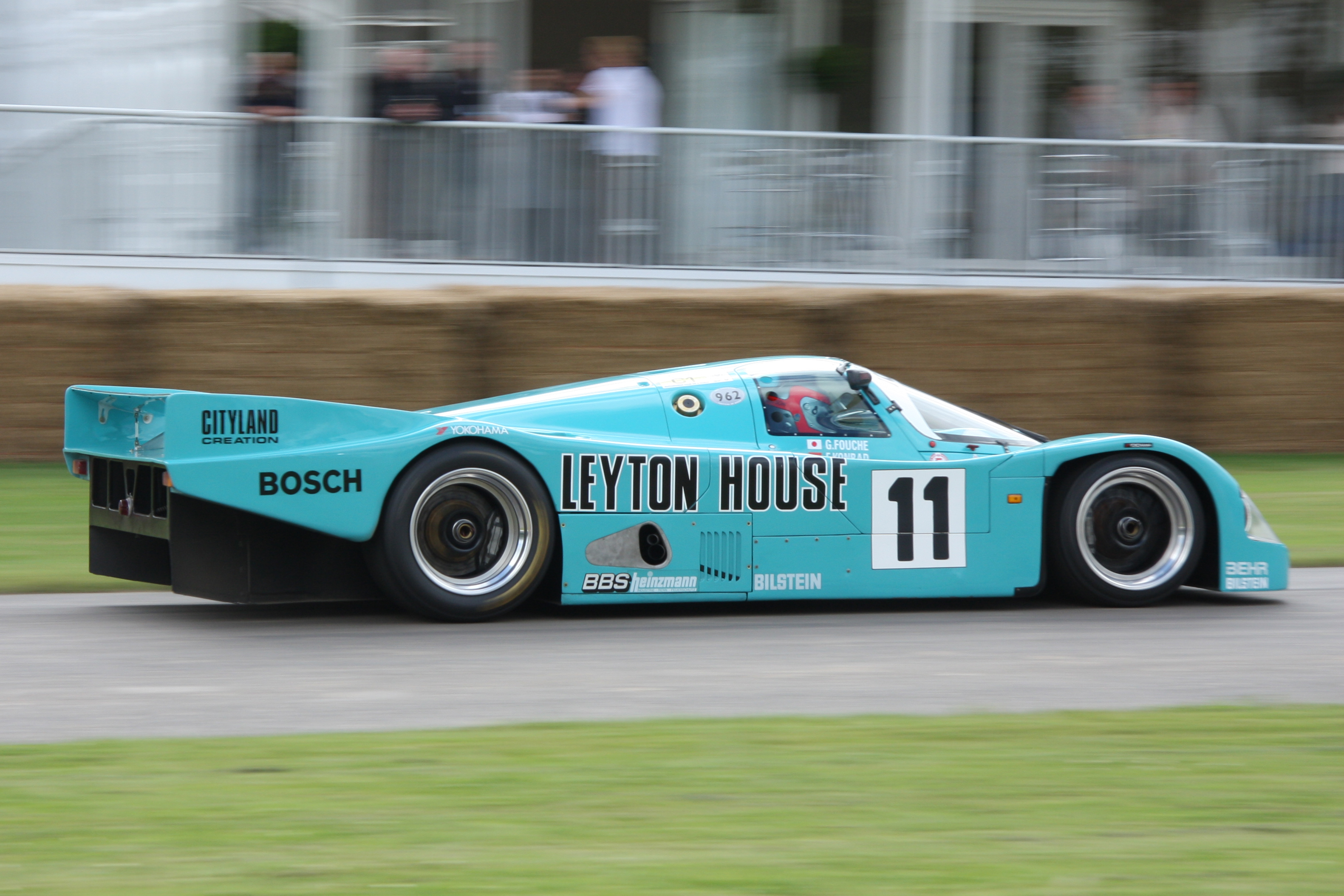
Kremer Porsche #11 finished 4th

Fourth was the Konrad/Fouché/Taylor Kremer Porsche. After getting its engine-unit reset in the first hour and dropping to 27th, they had driven back into the top-10 after four hours. Delayed by a brake-fluid leak at sundown, they were untroubled thereafter. The bedevilled Jaguar, once fighting for the lead, finally finished fifth, now 30 laps behind the winners.

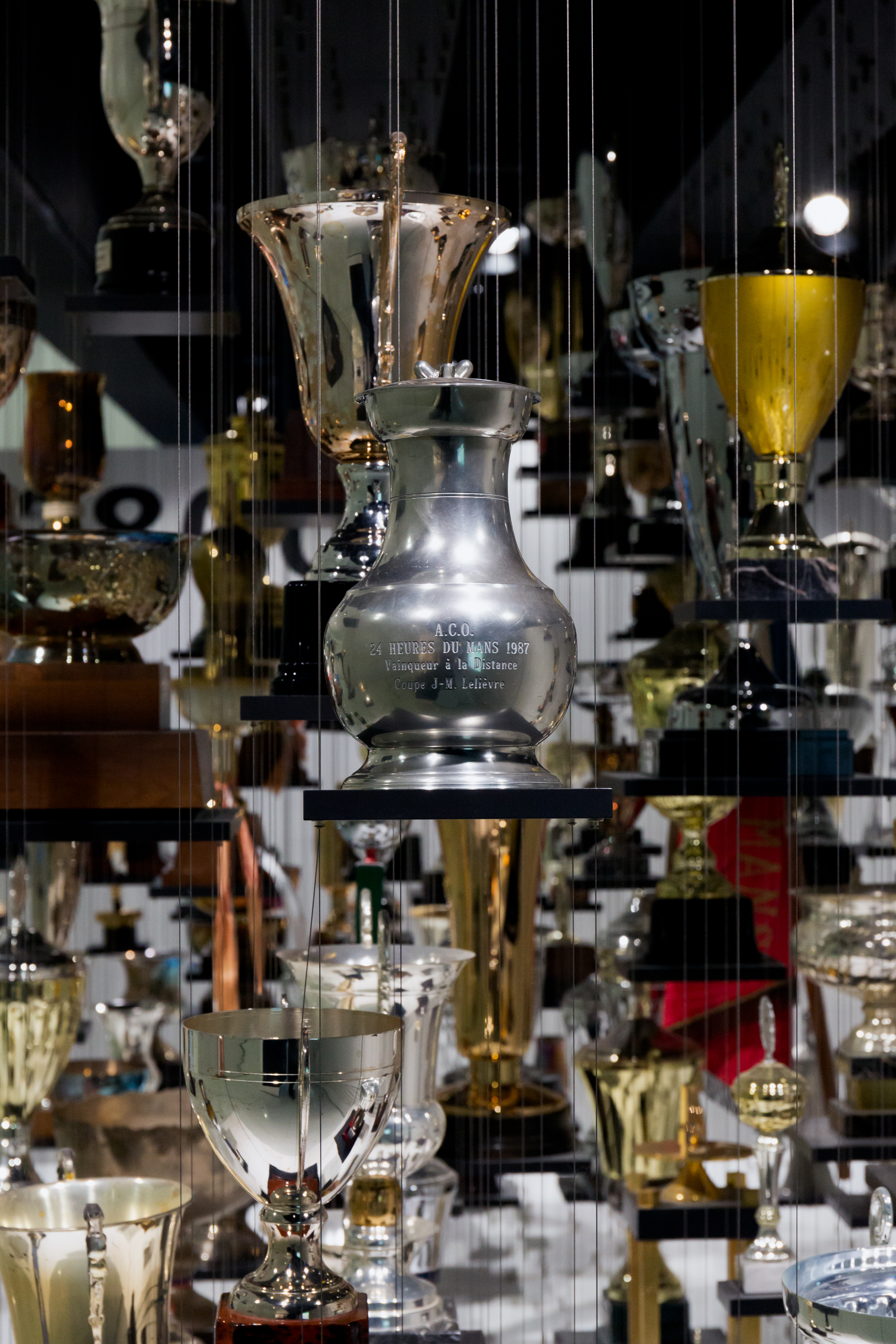
The 1987 Le Mans trophy, at the Porsche Museum

In the C2 class, having seen off the challenge from Ecurie Ecosse, Spice, Velez and de Henning romped to a class-victory. They had been running sixth overall since mid-morning, to finish 13 laps and over 160 km (100 miles) ahead of the Ecosse. After a broken exhaust had cost them a quarter-hour and the class-lead at 9am, Mallock, Leslie and Duez lost an hour at the middle of the day with clutch and transmission problems, eventually finishing 8th overall. Some consolation was had by them winning the Index of Energy Efficiency over the Spice team. The only Japanese car to finish was the European-driven Mazda – the only finisher in the GTP class and 7th overall. Louis Descartes had his most successful Le Mans, with both his cars finishing. The second car was not classified after too many delays in the pits, while Descartes own car was 11th overall, fifth in class. The hard-luck story of the race was the SHS C6 of Roland Bassaler. Clutch problems had struck almost immediately in the race, but thereafter had made quiet steady progress. In early Sunday afternoon they were into the top-10 overall, and then with an hour to go the clutch gave up. The team parked in the pits to go out with ten minutes to go for a last lap. However, it could not restart and Yvon never got out the pit-line. With just twelve classified finishers, this was the lowest number since the seven in 1970.

With this, his fifth victory, Derek Bell became the second-most successful driver at Le Mans, after his good friend Jacky Ickx (with 6 victories). Having achieved the unique double of winning both premier 24-hour sports-car races (Daytona and Le Mans) in the previous year, Holbert and Bell had repeated the achievement again this year, in a remarkable double-double. For the Porsche marque, this was their twelfth victory and 7th in a row.

Although Jaguar lost this battle, they won the war: with eight wins out of ten races this season, Jaguar would go on to take their first Manufacturer's World Title – a feat not accomplished even during the glory days of the D-Type in the 1950s. Raul Boesel would be crowned the Drivers' Champion, and it appeared there was a changing of the old order. The works Porsche team had quite a predicament – having dominated the Group C category to date, they essentially had a 7-year-old design to take on the more advanced Jaguar. Until now, their approach had been to develop their car within limits to not aggravate or alienate their customer teams. Those teams were now resorting to doing their own independent development to improve their cars. In fact, after the next round at the Norisring withdrew from the Championship, ostensibly to focus on its F1 TAG-engine program with McLaren.

The Spice and Ecurie Ecosse teams dominated the C2-class – the normally-aspirated Cosworths proving unbeatable, and together they won nine of the ten rounds (Tiga-Cosworth winning the other), while the turbo-charged teams were fast but suffered from chronic unreliability. Spice Engineering took the Teams' Championship, and Spice and Velez were the Drivers' Champions.

== Official results ==
=== Finishers ===
Results taken from Quentin Spurring's book, officially licensed by the ACO
Class Winners are in Bold text.

Pos	Class	No.	Team	Drivers	Chassis	Engine	Tyre	Laps
1	**Gr.C1**	**17**	**(West Germany) Rothmans Porsche**	**(United Kingdom) Derek Bell** **(West Germany) Hans-Joachim Stuck** **(United States) Al Holbert**	Porsche 962C	Porsche 935/82 3.0L F6 twin turbo	D	355
2	Gr.C1	72	(West Germany) Obermaier Racing (France) Primagaz Compétition	(West Germany) Jürgen Lässig (France) Pierre Yver (Belgium) Bernard de Dryver	Porsche 962C	Porsche 935/79 2.8L F6 twin turbo	G	335
3	Gr.C1	13	(France) Courage Compétition (France) Primagaz Compétition	(France) Yves Courage (France) Pierre-Henri Raphanel (Belgium) Hervé Regout	Cougar C20	Porsche 935/79 2.8L F6 twin turbo	MI	332
4	Gr.C1	11	(West Germany) Porsche Kremer Racing	(South Africa) George Fouché (Austria) Franz Konrad (South Africa) Wayne Taylor	Porsche 962C	Porsche 935/79 2.8L F6 twin turbo	Y	327
5	Gr.C1	4	(United Kingdom) Silk Cut Jaguar	(United States) Eddie Cheever (Brazil) Raul Boesel (Netherlands) Jan Lammers	Jaguar XJR-8LM	Jaguar 7.0L V12	D	239
6	**Gr.C2**	**111**	(United Kingdom) Spice Engineering	(United Kingdom) Gordon Spice (Spain) Fermín Velez (France) Philippe de Henning	Spice-Fiero SE86C	Cosworth DFL 3.3 L V8	A	321
7	**IMSA**; **GTP**	**202**	(Japan) Mazdaspeed	(Belgium) Pierre Dieudonné (Republic of Ireland) David Kennedy (Republic of Ireland) Mark Galvin	Mazda 757	Mazda 13G 1962cc triple-rotary	D	319
8	Gr.C2	102	(United Kingdom) Swiftair Ecurie Ecosse	(United Kingdom) David Leslie (United Kingdom) Ray Mallock (Belgium) Marc Duez	Ecosse C286	Cosworth DFL 3.3 L V8	Y	308
9	Gr.C2	121	(United Kingdom) Cosmik GP Motorsport	(United Kingdom) Dudley Wood (Greece) Costas Los (United States) Tom Hessert	Tiga GC287	Cosworth DFL 3.3 L V8	G	275
10	Gr.C2	114	Team Tiga Ford Denmark	(Denmark) Thorkild Thyrring (United Kingdom) John Sheldon (United Kingdom) Ian Harrower	Tiga GC287	Cosworth-Hart BDT-E 2.3L; S4 turbo	A	272
11	Gr.C2	177	(France) Automobiles; Louis Descartes (private entrant)	(France) Louis Descartes (France) Jacques Heuclin (France) Dominique Lacaud	ALD 03	BMW M88 3.5L S6	A	270
12	Gr.C1	40	(France) Graff Racing (France) J.-P. Grand (private entrant)	(France) Jean-Philippe Grand (Belgium) / (France) Gaston Rahier (France) Jacques Terrien	Rondeau M482	Cosworth DFL 3.3 L V8	G	260
N/C*	Gr.C2	127	(United Kingdom) Chamberlain Engineering	(United Kingdom) Nick Adams (South Africa) Graham Duxbury (United Kingdom) Richard Jones	Spice-Fiero SE86C	Hart 418T 1873cc S4 turbo	A	240
N/C*	Gr.C2	178	(France) Automobiles; Louis Descartes (private entrant)	(France) Michel Lateste (France) Gérard Tremblay (France) Sylvain Boulay	ALD 02	BMW M88 3.5L S6	A	236

- Note *: Not Classified because did not cover sufficient distance (70% of the winner) by the race's end.

=== Did not finish ===
Pos	Class	No	Team	Drivers	Chassis	Engine	Tyre	Laps	Reason
DNF	Gr.C2	181	(United Kingdom) Dune Motorsport (private entrant)	(Australia) Neil Crang (United Kingdom) Duncan Bain (Switzerland) Jean Krucker	Tiga GC287	Austin-Rover V64V 3.0L V6	A	260	Engine (23hr)
DNF	Gr.C2	108	(France) R. Bassaler (private entrant)	(France) Jean-François Yver (France) Yves Hervalet (France) Hervé Bourjade	Sauber SHS C6	BMW M88 3.5L S6	A	257	Clutch (24hr)
DNF	Gr.C1	6	(United Kingdom) Silk Cut Jaguar	(United Kingdom) Martin Brundle (Denmark) John Nielsen	Jaguar XJR-8LM	Jaguar 7.0L V12	D	231	Engine (17hr)
DNF	Gr.C2	123	(United Kingdom) Charles Ivey Racing	(United Kingdom) John Cooper (United Kingdom) Tom Dodd-Noble (Morocco) Max Cohen-Olivar	Tiga GC287	Porsche 935/76 2.6L F6 twin turbo	G	224	Engine (20hr)
DNF	Gr.C2	116	(Italy) Luigi Taverna; Techno Racing (private entrant)	(Italy) Luigi Taverna (United Kingdom) Evan Clements (France) Patrick Trucco	Alba AR3	Cosworth DFL 3.3 L V8	A	219	Gearbox (23hr)
DNF	IMSA; GTP	203	(West Germany) Porsche AG	(France) René Metge (Switzerland) Claude Haldi (Canada) Kees Nierop	Porsche 961	Porsche Type-935/82 2.8L F6 twin turbo	D	199	Accident (18hr)
DNF	Gr.C1	23	(Japan) Nissan Motorsports; International	(Japan) Kazuyoshi Hoshino (Japan) Kenji Takahashi (Japan) Keiji Matsumoto	Nissan R87E	Nissan VEJ30 3.0L V8 twin turbo	B	181	Engine (17hr)
DNF	Gr.C2	103	(United Kingdom) Bartlett Racing (private entrant) (United Kingdom) Goodmans Sound	(United Kingdom) Tim Lee-Davey (United Kingdom) Robin Donovan (France) Raymond Boutinaud	Bardon DB1	Cosworth DFV 3.0L V8	A	172	Gearbox (20hr)
DNF	Gr.C2	125	(France) Vetir Racing Team (private entrant)	(France) Jean-Claude Justice (France) Patrick Oudet (France) Bruno Sotty	Tiga GC84	Cosworth DFL 3.3 L V8	A	164	Engine (18hr)
DNF	Gr.C1	5	(United Kingdom) Silk Cut Jaguar	(Netherlands) Jan Lammers (United Kingdom) John Watson (United Kingdom) Win Percy	Jaguar XJR-8LM	Jaguar 7.0L V12	D	158	Accident (12hr)
DNF	Gr.C2	198	(United Kingdom) Roy Baker Racing (United Kingdom) Cosmik GP Motorsport	(United Kingdom) David Andrews (Canada) Robert Peters (United States) Mike Allison	Tiga GC286	Cosworth DFL 3.3 L V8	A	139	Gearbox (17hr)
DNF	Gr.C2	101	(United Kingdom) Swiftair Ecurie Ecosse	(United Kingdom) Mike Wilds (United States) Les Delano (United States) Andy Petery	Ecosse C286	Cosworth DFL 3.3 L V8	Y	135	Electrics (14hr)
DNF	Gr.C1	61	(Switzerland) Kouros Racing	(France) Henri Pescarolo (New Zealand) Mike Thackwell (Japan) Hideki Okada	Sauber C9	Mercedes-Benz M117; 5.0L V8 twin turbo	MI	123	Transmission (16hr)
DNF	Gr.C1	3	(Switzerland) Brun Motorsport	(United Kingdom) / (Canada) Bill Adam (Canada) Richard Spenard (Canada) Scott Goodyear	Porsche 962C	Porsche 935/79 2.8L F6 twin turbo	MI	120	Engine (10hr)
DNF	Gr.C1	32	(Japan) Nissan Motorsports; International	(Japan) Masahiro Hasemi (Japan) Takao Wada (Japan) Aguri Suzuki	Nissan R87E	Nissan VEJ30 3.0L V8 twin turbo	D	117	Transmission (17hr)
DNF	Gr.C1	15	(United Kingdom) Britten-Lloyd Racing (United Kingdom) Liqui Moly Equipe	(United Kingdom) Jonathan Palmer (United Kingdom) James Weaver (United States) Price Cobb	Porsche 962C GTi	Porsche 935/79 2.8L F6 twin turbo	G	112	Accident (9hr)
DNF	Gr.C1	1	(Switzerland) Brun Motorsport	(France) Michel Trollé (France) Paul Belmondo (France) Pierre de Thoisy	Porsche 962C	Porsche 935/79 2.8L F6 twin turbo	MI	88	Accident (8hr)
DNF	Gr.C1	29	(Japan) Italya Sports (Japan) Team LeMans	(Sweden) Anders Olofsson (France) Alain Ferté (France) Patrick Gonin	Nissan R86V	Nissan VG30ET 3.0L V6 twin turbo	Y	86	Accident (8hr)
DNF	Gr.C1	2	(Switzerland) Brun Motorsport	(Argentina) Oscar Larrauri (Spain) Jesús Pareja (West Germany) Uwe Schäfer	Porsche 962C	Porsche 935/79 2.8L F6 twin turbo	MI	40	Accident (4hr)
DNF	Gr.C1	37	(Japan) Toyota Team TOM's	(Japan) Masanori Sekiya (Japan) Kaoru Hoshino (United Kingdom) Tiff Needell	Toyota 87C-L	Toyota 3S-GTM 2.1L S4 turbo	B	39	Engine (6hr)
DNF	Gr.C1	62	(Switzerland) Kouros Racing	(United Kingdom) Johnny Dumfries (New Zealand) Mike Thackwell (United States) Chip Ganassi	Sauber C9	Mercedes-Benz M117; 5.0L V8 twin turbo	MI	37	Gearbox (4hr)
DNF	IMSA; GTP	201	(Japan) Mazdaspeed	(Japan) Yojiro Terada (Japan) Yoshimi Katayama (Japan) Takashi Yorino	Mazda 757	Mazda 13G 1962cc triple-rotary	D	34	Engine (4hr)
DNF	Gr.C1	36	(Japan) Toyota Team TOM's	(United Kingdom) Geoff Lees (Australia) Alan Jones (Sweden) Eje Elgh	Toyota 87C-L	Toyota 3S-GTM 2.1L S4 turbo	B	19	Fuel pump (2hr)
DNF	Gr.C2	113	(France) J. Thibault (private entrant)	(France) José Thibault (France) André Heinrich (France) Lionel Née	Chevron B36 Coupé	ROC-Talbot 2.1L S4 turbo	A	18	Accident (4hr)
DNF	Gr.C1	18	(West Germany) Rothmans Porsche	(West Germany) Jochen Mass (France) Bob Wollek (Australia) Vern Schuppan	Porsche 962C	Porsche 935/82 3.0L F6 twin turbo	D	16	Engine (2hr)
DNF	Gr.C1	51	(France) WM Secateva	(France) Jean-Daniel Raulet (France) François Migault (France) Pascal Pessiot	WM P86	Peugeot PRV ZNS4 2.9L; V6 twin-turbo	MI	14	Engine (2hr)
DNF	Gr.C1	52	(France) WM Secateva	(France) Roger Dorchy (France) Philippe Gache (France) Dominique Delestre	WM P87	Peugeot PRV ZNS4 2.9L; V6 twin-turbo	MI	13	Engine (5hr)
DNF	Gr.C2	118	(Italy) O. Iacobelli (private entrant); Chamberlain Engineering	(Italy) Olindo Iacobelli (France) Jean-Louis Ricci (France) Georges Tessier	Royale RP40	Cosworth DFL 3.3 L V8	MI	13	Engine (5hr)
DNF	Gr.C2	200	(West Germany) Dahm Cars Racing Team (private entrant)	(West Germany) Peter Fritsch (Belgium) Teddy Pilette (Belgium) Jean-Paul Libert	Argo JM19	Porsche Type-930 3.2L F6 twin turbo	G	12	Engine (2hr)
DNF	Gr.C1	8	(West Germany) Joest Racing	(Sweden) Stanley Dickens (West Germany) Frank Jelinski (United States) Hurley Haywood	Porsche 962C	Porsche 935/79 2.8L F6 twin turbo	G	7	Engine (1hr)
DNF	Gr.C1	10	(West Germany) Porsche Kremer Racing	(West Germany) Volker Weidler (Denmark) Kris Nissen (Japan) Kunimitsu Takahashi	Porsche 962C	Porsche 935/79 2.8L F6 twin turbo	Y	6	Engine (1hr)
DNF	Gr.C2	117	(Norway) Lucky Strike Schanche; Racing (private entrant)	(Norway) Martin Schanche (United Kingdom) Will Hoy (United Kingdom) Robin Smith	Argo JM19B	Zakspeed 1850cc S4 turbo	G	5	Accident (2hr)
DNF	Gr.C1	7	(West Germany) Joest Racing	(South Africa) Sarel van der Merwe (United Kingdom) David Hobbs (United States) Chip Robinson	Porsche 962C	Porsche 935/79 2.8L F6 twin turbo	G	4	Engine (1hr)
DNF	Gr.C1	42	(France) N. del Bello (private entrant)	(Switzerland) Pierre-Alain Lombardi (France) Gilles Lempereur (France) Jacques Guillot	Sauber C8	Mercedes-Benz M117; 5.0L V8 twin turbo	G	4	Transmission (2hr)

=== Did not start ===
Pos	Class	No	Team	Drivers	Chassis	Engine	Tyre	Reason
DNS	Gr.C1	19	(West Germany) Rothmans Porsche	(Australia) Vern Schuppan (United States) Price Cobb (Canada) Kees Nierop	Porsche 962C	Porsche 935/82 3.0L F6 twin turbo	D	Practice Accident
DNQ	Gr.C2	171	(Sweden) CEE Sport Racing (private entrant)	(Sweden) Slim Borgudd (Sweden) Tryggve Gronvall (United States) Ray Ratcliffe	Tiga GC286	Volvo 2.3L S4 turbo	A	
DNA	Gr.C1	9	(West Germany) Joest Racing	(Sweden) Stanley Dickens (West Germany) "John Winter" (Louis Krages) (United Kingdom) David Hobbs (South Africa) Sarel van der Merwe	Porsche 962C	Porsche 935/79 2.8L F6 twin turbo	G	Did not arrive
DNA	Gr.C1	20	(United Kingdom) Tiga Team	(Brazil) Chico Serra (United Kingdom) Tim Lee-Davey (United Kingdom) James Weaver	Tiga GC87	Cosworth DFL 3.3 L V8 turbo		Did not arrive
DNA	Gr.C1	22	(United Kingdom) Portman Lamborghini	(Italy) Mauro Baldi (United Kingdom) Tiff Needell	Tiga-Lamborghini Countach QVX	Lamborghini 5.7L V12	G	Did not arrive
DNA	Gr.C1	41	(France) Bussi Racing (private entrant)	(France) Christian Bussi	Rondeau M382	Cosworth DFL 3.3 L V8		Did not arrive
DNA	Gr.C2	107	(Italy) O. Iacobelli (private entrant)		Sauber SHS C6	BMW M88 3.5L S6		Did not arrive
DNA	Gr.C2	109	(Italy) G. Argenziano (private entrant)	(Italy) Pasquale Barberio (Greece) Costas Los	Tiga GC85	Cosworth DFL 3.3 L V8		Did not arrive
DNA	Gr.C2	110	(Italy) Carma FF	(Switzerland) Angelo Pallavicini (Switzerland) Marco Vanoli (Canada) Uli Bieri	Alba AR6	Ferrari 308C 3.0L V8 twin turbo		Did not arrive
DNA	Gr.C2	130	(Italy) Carma FF	(Italy) Martino Finotto (Italy) Carlo Facetti	Alba AR6	Carma FF 1915cc S4 turbo		Did not arrive
DNA	Gr.C2	115	(United Kingdom) ADA Engineering	(United Kingdom) Ian Harrower (United Kingdom) Evan Clements	ADA 02	Cosworth DFL 3.3 L V8	A	Did not arrive
DNA	Gr.C2	199	(United Kingdom) Roy Baker Racing Tiga	(United Kingdom) David Andrews (Australia) Mike Hall	Tiga GC286	Cosworth DFL 3.3 L V8	A	Did not arrive
DNA	IMSA; GTP	204	(United Kingdom) RC Racing (private entrant)	(United Kingdom) Richard Cleare	March 85G	Porsche Type-962/70 3.0L F6 turbo	G	Did not arrive

=== Class winners ===
Class	Winning car	Winning drivers
Group C1	#17 Porsche 962C	Bell / Stuck / Holbert *
Group C2	#111 Spice-Fiero SE86C	Spice / Velez / de Henning *
IMSA-GTP	#202 Mazda 757	Dieudonné / Kennedy / Galvin *

- Note: all classes set new distance records for the new circuit configuration.

=== Index of Energy Efficiency ===
Pos	Class	No	Team	Drivers	Chassis	Score
1	Gr.C2	102	(United Kingdom) Swiftair Ecurie Ecosse	(United Kingdom) David Leslie (United Kingdom) Ray Mallock (Belgium) Marc Duez	Ecosse C286	1.131
2	Gr.C2	111	(United Kingdom) Spice Engineering	(United Kingdom) Gordon Spice (Spain) Fermín Velez (France) Philippe de Henning	Spice-Fiero SE86C	1.016
3	Gr.C2	177	(France) Automobiles; Louis Descartes (private entrant)	(France) Louis Descartes (France) Jacques Heuclin (France) Dominique Lacaud	ALD 03	0.977
4	Gr.C2	121	(United Kingdom) Cosmik GP Motorsport	(United Kingdom) Dudley Wood (Greece) Costas Los (United States) Tom Hessert	Tiga GC287	0.930
5	Gr.C1	40	(France) Graff Racing (France) J.-P. Grand (private entrant)	(France) Jean-Philippe Grand (Belgium) / (France) Gaston Rahier (France) Jacques Terrien	Rondeau M482	0.887
6	Gr.C1	17	(West Germany) Rothmans Porsche	(United Kingdom) Derek Bell (West Germany) Hans-Joachim Stuck (United States) Al Holbert	Porsche 962C	0.862
7	Gr.C1	4	(United Kingdom) Silk Cut Jaguar	(United States) Eddie Cheever (Brazil) Raul Boesel (Netherlands) Jan Lammers	Jaguar XJR-8LM	0.852
8	IMSA; GTP	202	(Japan) Mazdaspeed	(Belgium) Pierre Dieudonné (Republic of Ireland) David Kennedy (Republic of Ireland) Mark Galvin	Mazda 757	0.771
9	Gr.C1	72	(West Germany) Obermaier Racing (France) Primagaz Compétition	(West Germany) Jürgen Lässig (France) Pierre Yver (Belgium) Bernard de Dryver	Porsche 962C	0.755
10	Gr.C1	13	(France) Courage Compétition (France) Primagaz Compétition	(France) Yves Courage (France) Pierre-Henri Raphanel (Belgium) Hervé Regout	Cougar C20	0.745

- Note: Only the top ten positions are included in this set of standings.

=== Statistics ===
Taken from Quentin Spurring's book, officially licensed by the ACO

- Pole Position – B. Wollek, #18 Porsche 962C– 3:21.1secs; 242.3 km/h (150.6 mph)
- Fastest Lap – J. Dumfries, #62 Sauber C9 – 3:25.4secs; 237.2 km/h (147.4 mph)
- Winning Distance – 4,791.70 km (2,977.42 mi)
- Winner's Average Speed – 199.66 km/h (124.06 mph)
- Attendance – 120,000+

== Notes ==
World Sportscar Championship
Previous race: 1987 1000km of Silverstone	1987 season	Next race: 1987 200 Miles of Norisring
