= WM P87 =

French prototype racing car, 1987–1988

- Category: Group C1
- Constructor: Welter-Meunier
- Designer(s): Gérard Welter; Michel Meunier
- Predecessor: WM P86
- Successor: WM P88

Technical specifications
- Chassis: Carbon kevlar
- Suspension (front): Double wishbone
- Suspension (rear): Same as front
- Engine: Peugeot ZNS4 2.9 L (2,850 cc) V6 twin turbocharged Mid-engined, longitudinally mounted
- Transmission: Hewland VG5200 5-speed manual
- Tyres: Michelin

Competition history
- Notable entrants: WM Secateva
- Notable drivers: (France) Roger Dorchy; (France) Philippe Gache; (France) Dominique Delestre; (France) Pascal Pessiot; (France) Jean-Daniel Raulet
- Debut: 1987 24 Hours of Le Mans
- Last season: 1988 24 Hours of Le Mans
Races	Wins	Poles	F/Laps
2	0	0	0
- Constructors' Championships: 0
- Drivers' Championships: 0

The Welter-Meunier P87 was a Group C sports prototype race car, designed, developed, and built by French motorsports team Welter Racing in 1987 and used in sports car racing until 1988. Only one model was produced.

== Background and "Project 400" ==
In 1976, Gérard Welter and Michel Meunier founded a racing team in order to start regularly with sports cars in the Le Mans 24-hour race. The small racing team developed surprisingly fast racing cars, which, however, often lacked stability. Finishing the 24-hour race in western France remained the exception. After the end of the race in 1986, which, in addition to a failure of the P86, ended with 12th place overall for the P83B, driven by Claude Haldi, Roger Dorchy, and Pascal Pessiot (67 laps behind the winners Hans-Joachim Stuck, Derek Bell and Al Holbert in the factory Porsche 962C), Welter decided to pool the limited resources in a new project.

The aim was now to surpass the 400 km/h hurdle at the fastest point of the course in the race in one of the next two years. A lot of preparatory work had to be done for this. First of all, Welter had to convince those responsible at the ACO of the sense and feasibility of the company. Above all, it was about getting the ACO to take official measurements so that any record would also be recognized. Then a tire manufacturer had to be found that would supply the necessary products. French tire manufacturer Michelin supplied tires with a special compound and guaranteed a speed of 410 km/h.

The drivers also had to be involved in advance, because such high speeds were and are the exception even in professional motorsport. Philippe Gache, Roger Dorchy, and Dominique Delestre agreed to drive a car capable of that top speed at Le Mans 1987.

== Development, design and technology ==
The basis of the project and the key to the long-term cooperation between Welter and Peugeot was the PRV engine. In the 1980s, many observers also saw a hidden Peugeot factory entry behind the World Championship racing cars. As a Peugeot designer, Welter had excellent contacts with the Peugeot board of directors, but the Welter team was never a works team. The PRV engine was a collaboration between Peugeot, Renault, and Volvo and intended for the series. Derivatives of this found their way into motorsport. In 1987, Welter was able to fall back on the most powerful example of this engine type to date. The 2.8-liter V6 engine was twin-turbocharged and produced 890 hp.

Welter was allowed to use the Peugeot wind tunnel in Sochaux every Sunday for five months. Almost all WM prototypes had hidden rear wheel arches; in the case of the P87, particular attention was paid to this component. The Welter aerodynamicists wanted to avoid even the smallest wind turbulence on the side flanks. The team also found a special solution for the air supply to the charge air coolers. Air was sucked in under the car through special pipes under the suspension. In order to be able to use the ground effect optimally, the P87 had an extended wheelbase compared to its predecessor models. The first attempts without a rear wing were abandoned again because the car had almost no balance in the curves.

== Racing history ==
During the Le Mans test days in May 1987, the team hardly got to drive. Roger Dorchy barely managed two laps in a row due to constant engine management problems. The fastest recorded speed on the Ligne Droite des Hunaudières was 356 km/h. A high speed, but not record-breaking. The problem with the engine management was solved in the Welter workshop and the car was tested again on a new and not yet opened section of the motorway. The measurement carried out by Welter showed 416 km/h: again Roger Dorchy at the wheel. Whether Welter's measurement was really precise remains open to this day.

The Le Mans race was short. In practice, the team only managed 21st place on the grid, which came as no surprise as the car lost a lot of time in the corners. In the race – Roger Dorchy drove the first stints – the turbochargers broke after 13 laps and the team had to give up. The ACO gave 387 km/h as the highest speed.

In 1988 Welter returned to Le Mans. The P88 differed from the P87 in having an even more powerful engine. Roger Dorchy officially broke the 400 km/h barrier at 405 km/h. The P87 was also used again. Pascal Pessiot and Jean-Daniel Raulet were stopped after 22 laps by a defective gearbox.
