= 1982 1000 km of Nürburgring =

Sports car endurance race in Germany

The Nürburgring (1967–1982)

The XXVIII. ADAC 1000 km Rennen Nürburgring was an endurance race held at the Nürburgring Nordschleife on May 30, 1982. It was Round 3 of the 1982 World Sportscar Championship. The event was won by the No. 50 Martini Racing Lancia LC1 driven by Michele Alboreto, Teo Fabi, and Riccardo Patrese.

== Results ==
Class winners are denoted in bold.

Pos	Class	No	Team	Drivers	Car	Laps
1	**Gr. 6**	**50**	**(Italy) Martini Racing**	**(Italy) Michele Alboreto (Italy) Teo Fabi (Italy) Riccardo Patrese**	**Lancia LC1**	**44**
2	**C**	**24**	**(France) Jean Rondeau**	**(France) Henri Pescarolo (Germany) Rolf Stommelen**	**Rondeau M382**	**43**
3	**Gr. 5**	**33**	**(Italy) BMW Italia**	**(Switzerland) Enzo Calderari (Italy) Umberto Grano (Germany) Helmut Kelleners**	**BMW M1**	**41**
4	Gr. 5	40	(Germany) Jägermeister Racing Team	(Germany) Mario Ketterer (Germany) Anton Fischhaber (Germany) Eckhard Schimpf	BMW 320	39
5	**IMSA GTO**	**58**	**(United Kingdom) Canon Cameras GTi Engineering**	**(United Kingdom) Richard Lloyd (United Kingdom) Tony Dron (Netherlands) Hans Volker**	**Porsche 924 Carrera GTR**	**39**
6	**IMSA GTU**	**71**	**(Germany) Mazda Rotary Racing - Autohaus Becker**	**(Germany) Armin Hahne (Germany) Heinz Becker**	**Mazda RX-7**	**39**
7	**GT**	**52**	**(Denmark) Team Castrol - Jens Winther**	**(Denmark) Jens Winther (Denmark) Lars-Viggo Jensen**	**BMW M1**	**38**
8	GT	61	(Germany) Mich Opel Tuning	(Germany) Karl-Heinz Gürthler (Germany) Karl-Heinz Schäfer	Opel Ascona	38
9	**B**	**38**	**(Germany) Müllerbräu Team**	**(Germany) Fritz Müller (Germany) Georg Memminger**	**Porsche 930**	**36**
10	**T**	**73**	**(Germany) Renngemeinschaft Bergisch-Gladbach e.V. im ADAC**	**(Germany) Michael Martini (Germany) Hans Weißgerber (Germany) Jürgen Möhle**	**BMW 525i**	**36**
11	T	98	(Germany) Brauneiser Renntechnik	(Germany) Franz-Josef Bröhling (Germany) Axel Felder	Ford Escort	36
12	T	113	(Germany) Renngemeinschaft Sieglar e.V. im ADAC	(Germany) Norbert Hoffman (Germany) Hermann-Josef Nett	Audi 80	36
13	T	95	(Germany) Eichberg Racing	(Germany) Peter Feldin (Germany) Günther Bochem (Germany) Wilfried Oetelshoven	Ford Escort	36
14	T	122	(Germany) Manfred Mohr	(Germany) Jürgen Zehra (Germany) Frank Meyer	Alfa Romeo Alfetta	35
15	T	101	(Germany) H.W.R.T. Auto Tuning GmbH	(Germany) Manfred Burkhard (Germany) Norbert Brenner (Germany) Wilhelm Kern	Ford Escort	35
16	Gr. 5	31	(Denmark) Team Castrol Danmark	(Denmark) Jörgen Poulsen (Denmark) Peter Hansen	Porsche 935 K3	35
17	T	109	(Germany) Brauneiser Renntechnik	(Germany) Joachim Scheefeldt (Germany) Olaf Manthey (Germany) Joachim Utsch	Ford Escort	35
18	T	103	(Germany) Mich Opel Tuning	(Germany) Friedrich Schütte (Germany) Altfrid Heger (Germany) Karl-Heinz Schäfer	Opel Kadett	34
19	**ser.GT**	**82**	**(Germany) Kannacher GT Racing**	**(Germany) Matthias Lörper (Germany) Franz-Richard Friebel (Germany) Karl-Josef Römer**	**Porsche 930**	**31**
20 DNF	C	7	(Germany) Ford Team Zakspeed	(Germany) Klaus Ludwig (Germany) Manfred Winkelhock	Ford C100	31
21	Gr. 6	45	(United Kingdom) Dorset Racing Associates	(United Kingdom) Roy Baker (United Kingdom) François Duret (United Kingdom) Nick Faure	Lola T298	31
22	GT	60	(Germany) Mantzel & Kissling Tuning	(Germany) Wolfgang Offermann (Germany) Christoph Esser	Opel Ascona	30
23	ser.GT	81	(Germany) Kannacher GT Racing	(Germany) Klaus Drees (Germany) Horst Hoier	Porsche 930	30
24 NC	Gr. 6	46	(United Kingdom) David Mercer Racing	(United Kingdom) David Mercer (United Kingdom) Mike Chittenden	Vogue SP2	27
25 NC	T	93	(Germany) Essen Werdener Automobil Club e.V. im ADAC	(Germany) Friedrich Burgmann (Germany) Harald ten Eicken (Germany) Artur Deutgen	BMW 320	22
26 DNF	T	94	(Germany) Constructa Racing Team	(Germany) Herbert Kummle (Germany) Karl Mauer	Ford Escort	21
27 DNF	T	99	(Germany) Brauneiser Renntechnik	(Germany) Peter Faubel (Germany) Jochen Felder (Germany) Heinz Gilges	Ford Escort	21
28 DNF	T	119		(Germany) Rudolf Dötsch (Germany) Bodo Jähn (Germany) Hans Ruch	Ford Escort	20
29 DNF	C	4	(Germany) Belga-Joest Racing Team	(France) Bob Wollek (Belgium) Philippe Martin (Belgium) Jean-Michel Martin	Porsche 936	19
30 DNF	T	90	(Germany) Jägermeister Racing Team	(Germany) Rick Köhler (Germany) Klaus Böhm (Germany) Jörg Denzel	BMW 320	19
31 DNF	T	110		(Germany) Herbert Asselborn (Germany) Wolfgang Boller (Germany) Wolfgang Braun	Ford Escort	18
32 DNF	GT	66	(Switzerland) Formel Rennsport Club der Schweiz - FRC	(Switzerland) Edi Kofel (Switzerland) Peter Zbinden (Switzerland) Marco Vanoli	Porsche 924 Carrera GTR	17
33 DNF	C	16	(United Kingdom) Ultramar Team Lola	(United Kingdom) Rupert Keegan (United Kingdom) Guy Edwards	Lola T610	15
34 DNF	T	100	(Germany) H.W.R.T. Auto Tuning GmbH	(Germany) Günther Braumüller (Germany) Andreas Schall (Germany) Dieter Selzer	Ford Escort	15
35 DNF	Gr. 5	63	(Italy) Scuderia Vesuvio	(Italy) Joe Castellano (Italy) Gianni Giudici	Lancia Beta Montecarlo	13
36 DNF	Gr. 5	36	(Switzerland) Claude Haldi	(Switzerland) Claude Haldi (France) Bernard Béguin (Germany) Harald Grohs	Porsche 935	12
37 DNF	GT	53	(Germany) Lässig-Obermaier Racing Team	(Germany) Hermann-Peter Duge (Germany) Kurt König (Germany) Jürgen Lässig	BMW M1	11
38 DNF	T	76	(Germany) Mendener Automobil Sport Club e.V.	(Germany) Walter Löffler (Germany) Herbert Hechler (Germany) Günter Filthaut	Opel Monza	10
39 DNF	T	96	(Germany) Eichberg Racing	(Germany) Hartmut Bauer (Germany) Hanno Schumacher (Germany) Frank Ossenberg	Ford Escort	8
40 DNF	C	20	(Germany) BASF-Cassetten Team GS-Sport	(Germany) Hans-Joachim Stuck (Germany) Hans Heyer	Sauber SHS C6	4
41 DNF	T	79	(Germany) Eichberg Racing	(Germany) Dieter Gartmann (Germany) Wolf-Dieter Feuerlein	Ford Capri	4
42 DNF	Gr. 6	51T	(Italy) Martini Racing	(Italy) Piercarlo Ghinzani (Italy) Riccardo Patrese	Lancia LC1	3
43 DNF	Gr. 6	48	(Germany) Roland Binder	(Germany) Roland Binder (Germany) Rolf Götz	Lola T296	3
44 DNF	Gr. 5	32	(United Kingdom) Charles Ivey Racing	(United Kingdom) John Cooper (United Kingdom) Paul Smith	Porsche 935	3
45 DNF	T	92	(Germany) Mendener Automobil Sport Club e.V.	(Germany) Peter Schumacher (Germany) Karl Helmich	BMW 320	2
46 DNF	Gr. 6	56	(Italy) Osella Mirabella Racing	(Italy) Giorgio Francia (Italy) Duilio Truffo	Osella PA9	1
47 DNF	Gr. 5	34	(Germany) Lässig-Obermaier Team	(Germany) Edgar Dören (Germany) Jürgen Lässig (Germany) Hermann-Peter Duge	Porsche 935 K3	1
48 DNF	C	9	(France) Peugeot-Talbot SA	(France) Michel Pignard (France) Jean-Daniel Raulet (France) Roger Dorchy	WM P82	1
49 DNF	C	21	(France) Societe Team	(France) Patrick Gaillard (France) Yves Courage (France) Jean-Philippe Grand	Cougar C01	1
50 DNF	C	22	(Germany) Kannacher GT Racing	(Germany) Jürgen Hamelmann (Germany) Harald Grohs (Germany) Helmut Gall	URD C81	0
51 DNF	T	91	(Germany) Renngemeinschaft Bergisch-Gladbach e.V. im ADAC	(Germany) Jürgen Möhle (Germany) Hans Weißgerber	BMW 320	0
DNS	Gr. 5	64	(Italy) Scuderia Vesuvio	(Italy) Gianni Giudici (Italy) Joe Castellano	Lancia Beta Montecarlo	0
DNS	T	121	(Germany) Krautol Farben	(Germany) Martin Wagenstetter (Germany) Kurt Hild	BMW 320	0
DNS	T	72	(Germany) Rhein-Ruhr Racing Team e.V. im ADAC	(Germany) Dieter Hegels (Germany) Peter Ernst	BMW 323i	0

== Notes ==
- Pole position: #7 Zakspeed Ford C100 (Manfred Winkelhock) - 7:16.570
