= Guy Fréquelin =

French rally driver (born 1945)

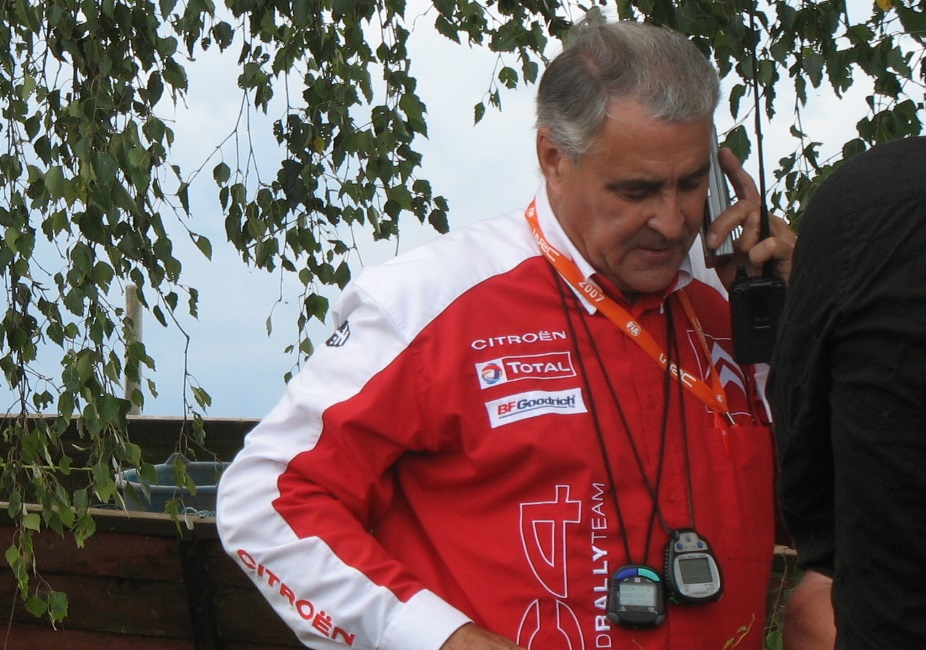
- Guy Fréquelin in 2007

Personal information
- Nationality: (France) French
- Born: 2 April 1945 (age 81); Langres

World Rally Championship record
- Years active: 1973–1985, 1987
- Co-driver: (France) Jean-Claude Marcoup (France) Jean Thimonier (Belgium) Christian Delferier (France) Jacques Delaval (France) Jean Todt (France) Jean-François Fauchille (Sweden) Bruno Berglund (Monaco) "Tilber" (France) Didier Breton
- Teams: Talbot, Opel
- Rallies: 35
- Championships: 0
- Rally wins: 1
- Podiums: 7
- Stage wins: 35
- Total points: 150
- First rally: 1973 Tour de Corse
- First win: 1981 Rally Argentina
- Last rally: 1987 San Remo Rally

Guy Fréquelin (born 2 April 1945 at Langres) is a French former rally and sports car driver.

== Biography ==
Perhaps Fréquelin's finest hour as a driver came when he finished runner-up only to Ari Vatanen, alongside then-navigator Jean Todt, at the wheel of a briefly competitive Sunbeam Lotus Talbot in the driver's classification of the 1981 World Rally Championship. It was during that year that he collected his only individual rally victory in the series, in Rally Argentina.

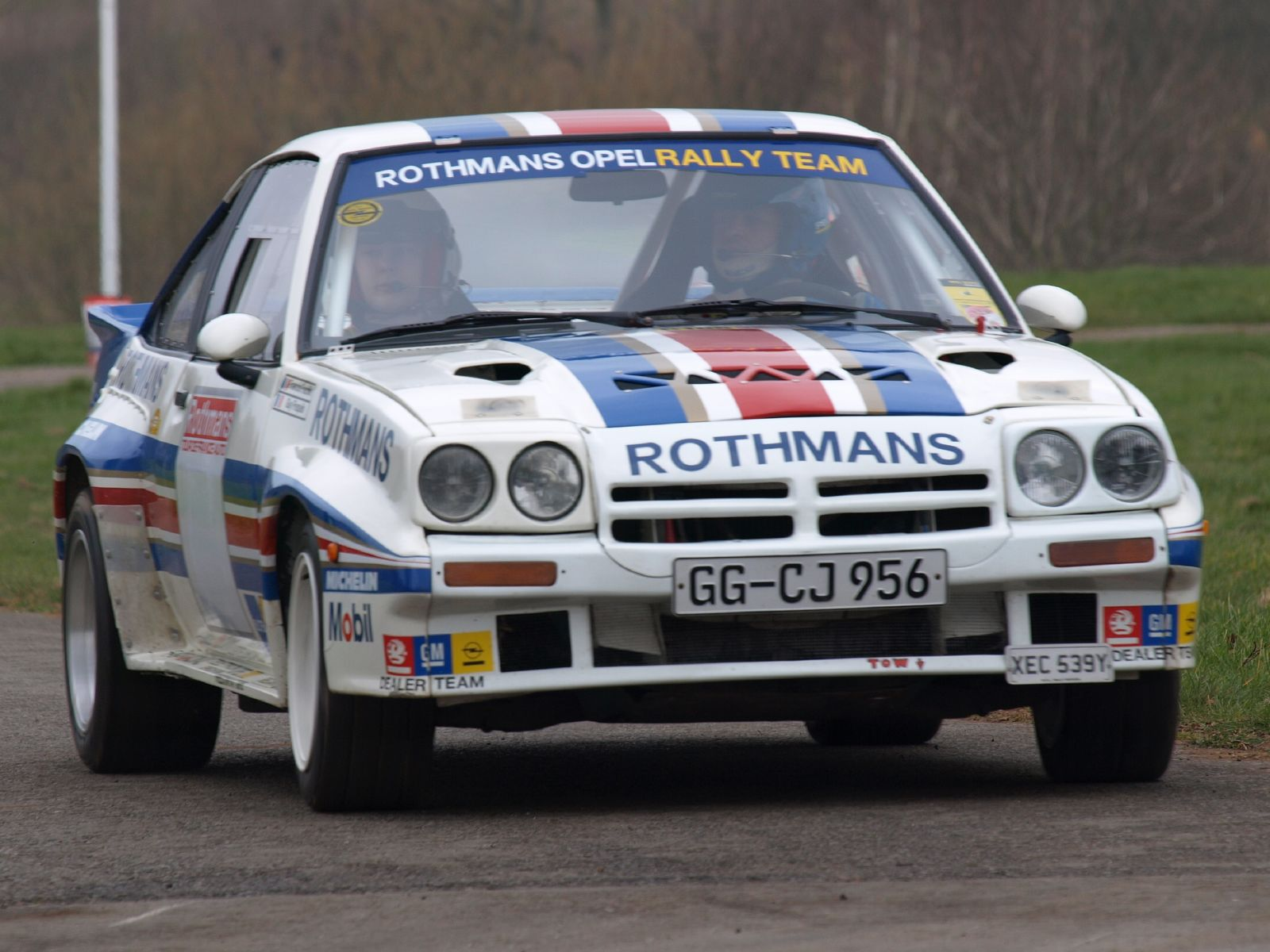
Fréquelin's Opel Manta 400 at the Race Retro 2008.

Fréquelin was also part of a four-car Renault assault on the 24 Hours of Le Mans in 1977 with their highly successful Alpine Renault A442B. As part of a team which included the French racing drivers, Jean-Pierre Jabouille, Jacques Laffite, Patrick Depailler, Patrick Tambay, Jean-Pierre Jaussaud, René Arnoux and Didier Pironi, as well as the English long distance expert Derek Bell, Fréquelin was named as the third driver for both the #7 Tambay/Jaussaud and the #16 Arnoux/Pironi machines. Neither cars were to finish the race. Tambay and Jaussaud eventually retired after just 158 laps with engine troubles to blame, while the sister #16 Arnoux/Pironi car was immediately out, with no laps registered to its name, after a turbo oil seal caused a fire. Fréquelin, though, was to return to the Sarthe circuit for the 1981 race, paired with countryman Roger Dorchy in the #5 WM P79/80 Peugeot. Again, though, he scored only a DNF after an engine fire forced the pair's exit after 46 laps.

In more recent years, Fréquelin has held a position as Team Principal at the Citroën Total World Rally Team. He retired at the end of 2007. In this position he oversaw the four consecutive world championship titles of Sébastien Loeb and an impressive number of victories in the Paris Dakar and in WRC, with cars such as the ZX, the Xsara and the C4.

In rallying circles, Fréquelin is nicknamed the Grizly.

== WRC victories ==
#	Event	Season	Co-driver	Car
1	(Argentina) 3º Rally Codasur	1981	Jean Todt	Talbot Sunbeam Lotus

== Racing record ==
=== Complete WRC results ===
Year	Entrant	Car	1	2	3	4	5	6	7	8	9	10	11	12	13	WDC	Pts
1973	Audi - NSU France	Audi 80	MON	SWE	POR	KEN	MOR	GRE	POL	FIN	AUT	ITA	USA	GBR	FRA; Ret	N/A	
1974	Guy Fréquelin	Alfa Romeo Alfetta	POR	KEN	FIN	ITA	CAN	USA	GBR	FRA; 10						N/A	
1975	Guy Fréquelin	Alfa Romeo 2000 GTV	MON; 8	SWE	KEN	GRE	MOR	POR	FIN	ITA	FRA	GBR				N/A	
1976	Guy Fréquelin	Porsche 911 Carrera	MON; 7	SWE	POR	KEN	GRE	MOR	FIN	ITA						N/A	
1976	Guy Fréquelin	Opel Kadett GT/E									FRA; Ret	GBR				N/A	
1977	Guy Fréquelin	Alpine A310 1800	MON; Ret	SWE	POR	KEN	NZL	GRE	FIN	CAN						NC	0
1977	Guy Fréquelin	Renault 5 Alpine									ITA; Ret	FRA	GBR			NC	0
1978	Guy Fréquelin	Renault 5 Alpine	MON; 3	SWE	KEN	POR	GRE	FIN	CAN	ITA						NC	0
1978	Renault Elf Gitanes	Renault 5 Alpine									CIV; 5	FRA	GBR			NC	0
1979	Guy Fréquelin	Renault 5 Alpine	MON; 8	SWE	POR	KEN	GRE	NZL	FIN	CAN	ITA	FRA	GBR	CIV		54th	3
1980	Talbot Sport	Talbot Sunbeam Lotus	MON; Ret	SWE												8th	34
1980	Talbot Cars GB	Talbot Sunbeam Lotus			POR; 3	KEN	GRE	ARG	FIN	NZL	ITA; 4		GBR; 3	CIV		8th	34
1980	Talbot Cars GB	Talbot Sunbeam Lotus										FRA; Ret				8th	34
1981	Talbot Sport	Talbot Sunbeam Lotus	MON; 2	SWE	POR; 6		FRA; 2	GRE; 4	ARG; 1	BRA; 2	FIN	ITA; Ret		GBR; Ret		2nd	89
1981	Marshalls (EA) Ltd.	Peugeot 504 Coupé V6				KEN; Ret										2nd	89
1981	SARI Peugeot	Peugeot 504 Coupé V6											CIV; 5			2nd	89
1982	Esso	Porsche 911 SC	MON; 4	SWE	POR	KEN										12th	16
1982	Alméras / Esso	Porsche 911 SC					FRA; 6	GRE	NZL	BRA	FIN	ITA	CIV			12th	16
1982	Peugeot Talbot Sport	Talbot Sunbeam Lotus												GBR; 11		12th	16
1983	Rothmans Opel Rally Team	Opel Ascona 400	MON; Ret	SWE	POR	KEN										NC	0
1983	Rothmans Opel Rally Team	Opel Manta 400					FRA; Ret	GRE	NZL	ARG	FIN	ITA	CIV	GBR		NC	0
1984	Opel Euro Team	Opel Manta 400	MON	SWE	POR	KEN; Ret	FRA; 9	GRE	NZL	ARG	FIN	ITA	CIV	GBR		53rd	2
1985	Opel Euro Team	Opel Manta 400	MON	SWE	POR	KEN	FRA; Ret	GRE	NZL	ARG	FIN	ITA	CIV	GBR		NC	0
1987	GM Euro Sport	Opel Kadett GSI 16V	MON	SWE	POR	KEN	FRA; Ret	GRE	USA	NZL	ARG	FIN	CIV	ITA; 6	GBR	36th	6

=== Complete 24 Hours of Le Mans results ===
Year	Team	Co-Drivers	Car	Class	Laps	Pos.	Class Pos.
1977	(France) J. Haran de Chaunac	(France) Didier Pironi (France) René Arnoux	Renault Alpine A442	S +2.0	0	DNF	DNF
1978	(France) Equipe Renault Elf Sport Calberson	(France) Jean Ragnotti (France) José Dolhem (France) Jean-Pierre Jabouille	Renault Alpine A442A	S +2.0	358	4th	4th
1980	(France) WM Esso	(France) Roger Dorchy	WM P79/80-Peugeot	GTP	316	4th	2nd
1981	(France) WM A.E.R.E.M.	(France) Roger Dorchy (France) Xavier Mathiot	WM P79/80-Peugeot	GTP +3.0	46	DNF	DNF
1982	(France) WM Esso	(France) Roger Dorchy (France) Alain Couderc	WM P82-Peugeot	C	112	DNF	DNF
