= WM P88 =

French sports prototype race car

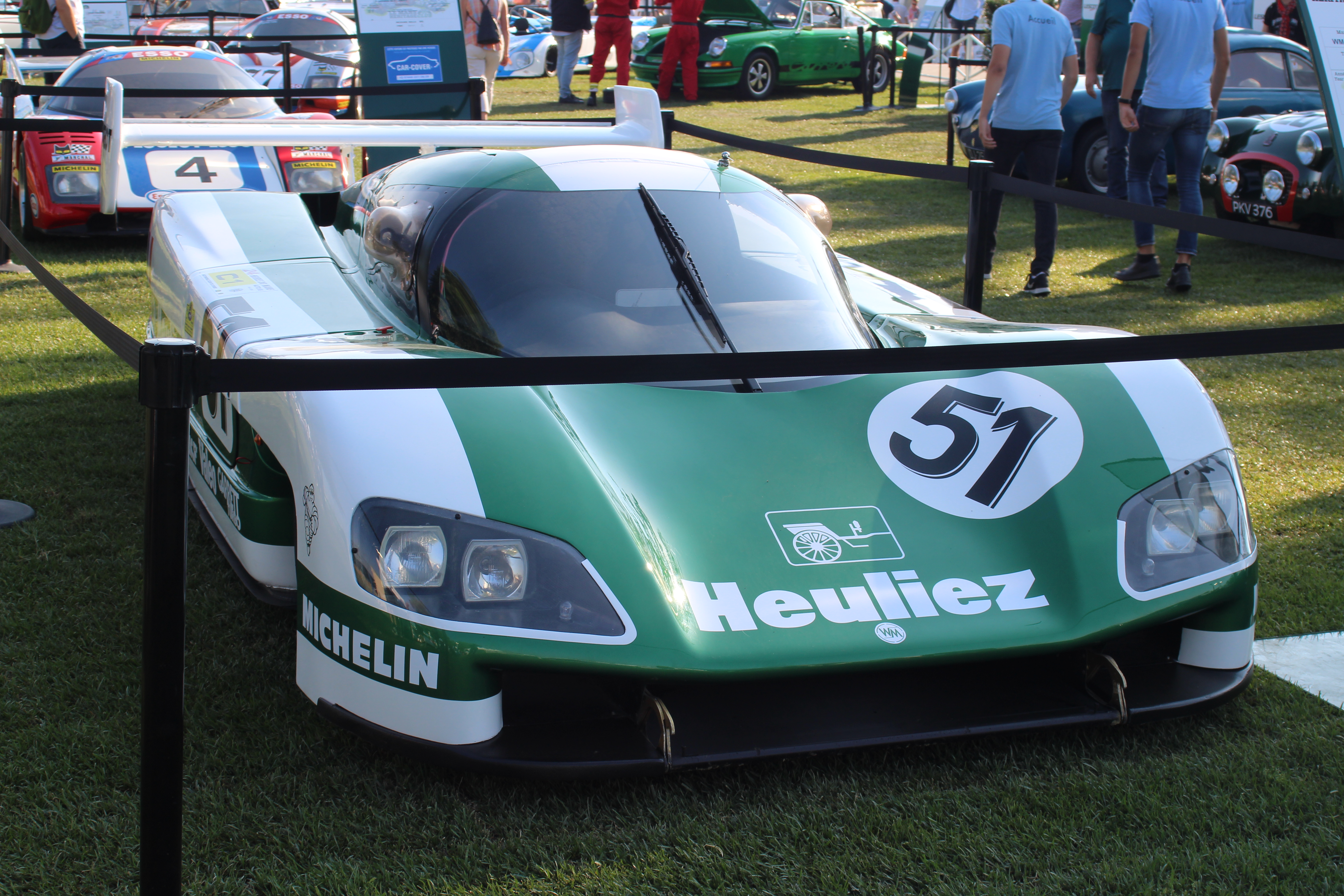
- Category: Group C1
- Constructor: Welter-Meunier
- Designers: Gérard Welter; Michel Meunier
- Predecessor: WM P87
- Successor: WM P489

Technical specifications
- Chassis: Aluminum
- Suspension (front): Double wishbone
- Suspension (rear): Same as front
- Engine: Peugeot ZNS5 3.0 L (2,974 cc) V6 twin turbocharged Mid-engined, longitudinally mounted
- Transmission: Hewland ZG400 5-speed manual
- Power: 910 hp
- Weight: 900 kg (1,984 lb)
- Fuel: Essence
- Tyres: Michelin

Competition history
- Notable entrants: WM Secateva
- Notable drivers: (France) Roger Dorchy; (Switzerland) Claude Haldi; (France) Jean-Daniel Raulet
- Debut: 1988 24 Hours of Le Mans
Races	Wins	Poles	F/Laps
1	0	0	0
- Constructors' Championships: 0
- Drivers' Championships: 0

The Welter-Meunier P88 is a Group C sports prototype race car, designed, developed, and built by the French racing team Welter Racing, specifically to compete in the 24 Hours of Le Mans that year. It was designed and constructed according to the FIA's technical and sporting regulations for sports car racing.

The car is notable for breaking the top speed record at the legendary Le Mans Circuit de la Sarthe, as it attained a maximum speed of 405 km/h (252 mph), which is still the fastest speed ever recorded at the Circuit.

== History ==
Gerard Welter and Michel Meunier, two Peugeot designers, in 1969 created their first racing car in their spare time by obtaining it from the chassis and mechanics of a Peugeot 204 convertible and baptizing it WM P69. Over time they became increasingly involved in this activity and in 1976 made their debut at Le Mans with a GTP car (a closed-body sports prototype) powered by an elaborate version of the Peugeot PRV. The car, built by a team of volunteers, achieved interesting results in subsequent editions but struggled to compare with the Group C cars that arrived on the track starting in 1982.

For this Welter and Meunier changed their programs after the 1986 edition of the French marathon, concentrating their efforts and their limited economic resources on a new and emblematic goal: to overcome the 400 km/h barrier on the Hunaudières straight. The car built for the Objectif 400 project was an evolution of the previous car, as had always been the tradition of the small French house in Thorigny Sur Marne.

== Design ==
Starting from the 1986 car, for the WM P87 the aluminium monocoque chassis with a central reinforcement beam, somewhat conventional, was modified, adding box-like structures in the nose and sides to be able to support the new bodywork, which was significantly wider than the previous one. The independent suspension on the four wheels was also quite conventional. The bodywork was modelled in the Peugeot wind tunnel, which also supplied the engine, where the team carried out tests on Sunday over a period of four months: the resulting shape had an increased width, which covered the wheels and greatly reduced the aerodynamic resistance and a better solution were found for the flow of fresh air to the intercoolers of the two turbochargers, by means of pipes that passed from the nose under the front suspension. As permitted by the Group C regulations, the car exploited the ground effect to generate downforce and the P87 saw the wheelbase and Venturi channels lengthened compared to the model that preceded it, in order to improve aerodynamic efficiency. While most of the downforce was produced from the bottom of the car, there was still a front splitter and a big rear wing, for aerodynamic balancing purposes.

As for the propulsion system, Welter-Meunier had a privileged relationship with Peugeot (Gérard Welter and Michel Meunier working on week days at Peugeot Style Centre – Welter becoming eventually the Director) and their cars had always been powered by highly elaborated versions of the PRV engine that fitted the French manufacturer's sedans. The P87 could count on a 2.8-liter version with double turbocharging of this 90° V6 engine, capable of producing up to 850 hp when the boost pressure was at maximum.

Based on the experience gained with the P87, the new car for 1988 was built with the help of the French coachbuilder Heuliez, called WM P88, refining and lightening the previous car (the weight saving was 65 kg ), equipping it with new rear suspensions that allowed the use of larger Venturi tunnels and creating an engine with a larger displacement and capable of delivering up to 900 hp.

== Racing history ==
The preparation of the P87 for the race was marred by engine management problems and the car was unable to make two consecutive laps during the pre-race tests, scoring a speed of 356 km/h (221 mph). Once the problems had been resolved, in the first days of June 1987, on the occasion of the inauguration of the new A26 motorway in the stretch from Saint-Quentin to Laon, the car present for an exhibition led by driver François Migault reached 416 km/h (258 mph), confirming the potential of the car.

In the race, the car was plagued, like many other competitors, by poor-quality fuel which damaged the engine and forced it to retire, while it had already been detected by the ACO speed detectors at 381 km/h, although the team claimed to have hit the target, on the basis of surveys made with their own means.

The following year the P88 did 387 km/h in qualifying, but once again the official reading was lower than the real speed of the car: A new tachometer radar was installed at the end of the straight. In the race, however, the P87 and P88 were plagued by problems, which prevented the achievement of the objective. The first had to retire after 13 laps with the transmission in pieces, and the second remained in the pits for more than three and a half hours with engine and bodywork problems before returning to the track with Roger Dorchy at the wheel. After a few laps, the green light came from the pits to raise the pressure turbos and so the French driver reached speeds of over 400 km/h for several laps, with the maximum recorded speed of 407 km/h, however Peugeot decided it was the perfect marketing opportunity, instead choosing to actually say the top speed was slower than the actual recorded top speed, choosing 405km/h as their official top speed as they were wanting to use it as marketing for their new 405 Sedan. However due to the stresses on the engine, combined with the previous problems, the car's engine became a 250mph hand grenade, which would force him to retire due to electrical problems, of cooling and turbo.

== Subsequent years ==
For the 1989 24 Hours of Le Mans, the French manufacturer fielded two cars: a P87 chassis and a P88 chassis; both equipped with minor technical updates and therefore renamed them the P489, recognizable on the outside by a different rear wing. The main objective of the team was not to reach new top speed records, aiming instead to finish the race, and in qualifying it still reached 388 km/h, however in the tests on one of the 2 prototypes (the #51) it developed a fire and was irreparably damaged, while on Pascal Pessiot's #52 a rear tire exploded while it was thrown on Mulsanne's bump at the end of the Hunaudières straight, but the driver managed to control the car. Only the #52 started, but it was forced to retire: Pascal Pessiot after having covered the Hunaudières at a very high speed broke the engine near the Mulsanne corner, then parked it in the escape route of the Indianapolis corner, and on the car, a fire broke out. It was the last year of Welter-Meunier: at the end of the season, the two partners dissolved the company.

After being withdrawn from racing, the WM P88 ended up in the Heuliez collection, which was auctioned in 2012 as part of a corporate restructuring. The P88 was sold without the engine that had allowed it to break the record and which is believed to still be in the hands of Gérard Welter.

The very high speeds achieved by the WMs and other prototypes prompted the FIA and the ACO to modify the Hunaudières straight at Le Mans, breaking it into three sections with two chicanes in 1990; as a result it is no longer possible to reach the 400 km/h barrier on the straight.
