= Claude Haldi =

Swiss racing driver

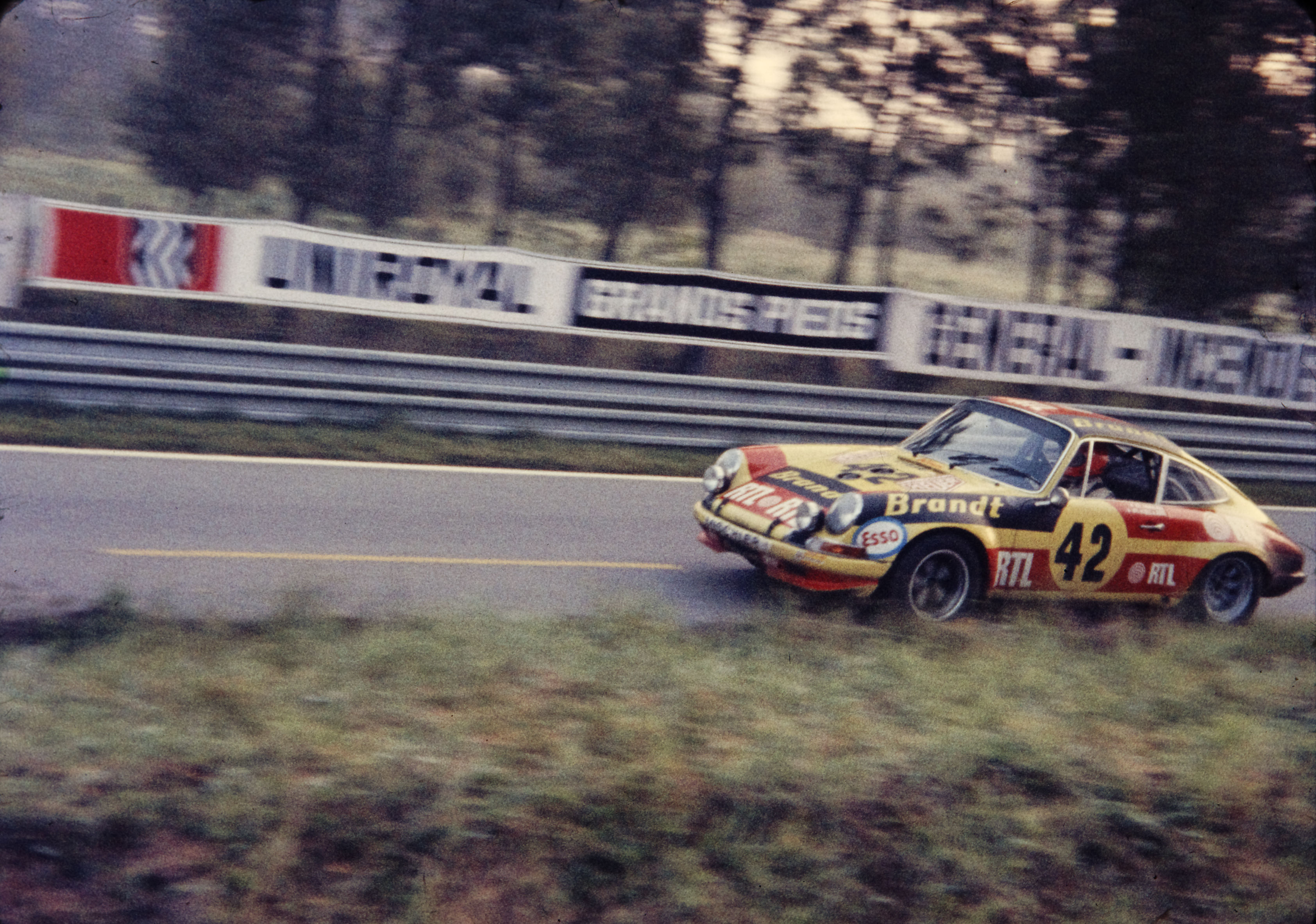
Porsche 911S of Claude Haldi and Paul Keller at the 1972 24 Hours of Le Mans

Claude Haldi (28 November 1942 – 25 December 2017) was a Swiss racing driver. He was known as a frequent competitor at the 24 Hours of Le Mans, entering the race 22 times between 1968 and 1993. His endurance racing career was associated with Porsche, with 14 of his Le Mans entries in various Porsche models. He drove for the Porsche factory works teams of Martini Racing in 1973 and Rothmans Porsche in 1987.

Haldi won the Porsche Cup, an annual award presented by Porsche AG to recognize the world's most successful privateer racing driver competing with Porsche machinery in a customer racing team, in 1975.

Beginning in 1985, Haldi drove for the WM Peugeot team. He was a co-driver of the WM P88 which broke the top speed record at Circuit de la Sarthe in 1988.

Haldi also participated in hill climbs and rallying. He won the Group 4 category of the European Hill Climb Championship in 1970 and the 1979 Swiss Rally Championship.

Following his retirement from racing, Haldi became president of the Vaud Automobile Club. In this position, he advocated against the Swiss ban on motorsport and proposed the creation of a Formula One circuit in Switzerland.

== Racing record ==
=== Complete 24 Hours of Le Mans results ===
Year	Team	Co-Drivers	Car	Class	Laps	Pos.	Class Pos.
1968	(Switzerland) Scuderia Filipinetti	(Switzerland) Jacques Rey	Ferrari 275 GTB/C	GT +2.0	78	DNF	DNF
1969	(Switzerland) Scuderia Filipinetti	(Switzerland) Jacques Rey	Ferrari 275 GTB/C	GT +2.0	39	DNF	DNF
1970	(Switzerland) Claude Haldi (Switzerland) Hart Ski Racing	(Switzerland) Arthur Blank	Porsche 911S	GT; 2.5	124	DNF	DNF
1971	(Switzerland) Claude Haldi	(Germany) Hans-Dieter Weigel	Porsche 908/2	P 3.0	18	DNF	DNF
1972	(Switzerland) Claude Haldi	(Switzerland) Paul Keller (France) "Gédéhem"	Porsche 911S	GT; 3.0	208	DNF	DNF
1973	(Germany) Martini Racing Team	(Germany) Reinhold Joest	Porsche 911 Carrera RSR	S 3.0	54	DNF	DNF
1974	(Spain) Escuderia Montjuich	(Spain) José-Maria Fernandez (France) Jean-Marc Seguin	Porsche 911 Carrera RSR	GT	41	DNF	DNF
1975	(Switzerland) Porsche Club Romand	(France) Bernard Béguin (Switzerland) Peter Zbinden	Porsche 911 Carrera Turbo	GTX	291	15th	1st
1976	(Switzerland) Schiller Racing Team	(Switzerland) Florian Vetsch	Porsche 934	GT	219	DNF	DNF
1977	(Switzerland) Schiller Racing Team	(Switzerland) Florian Vetsch (Switzerland) Angelo Pallavicini	Porsche 934	GT	123	DNF	DNF
1978	(Switzerland) Haberthur (Switzerland) Mecarillos-Cégécol Racing Team	(Switzerland) Herbert Müller (Switzerland) Nick McGranger	Porsche 935/76	Gr.5 +2.0	140	DNF	DNF
1979	(Switzerland) Claude Haldi	(Switzerland) Herbert Loewe (Panama) Rodrigo Terran	Porsche 935	Gr.5 +2.0	275	11th	4th
1980	(Switzerland) Meccarillos Racing	(France) Bernard Béguin (Germany) Volkert Merl	Porsche 935	Gr.5	37	DNF	DNF
1981	(Switzerland) Claude Haldi (United Kingdom) Charles Ivey Racing	(United Kingdom) Mark Thatcher (France) Hervé Poulain	Porsche 935	Gr.5	260	DNF	DNF
1982	(Switzerland) Claude Haldi	(Panama) Rodrigo Terran (France) François Hesnault	Porsche 935 K3	Gr.5	141	DNF	DNF
1983	(Switzerland) Claude Haldi	(Germany) Günther Steckkönig (Germany) Bernd Schiller	Porsche 930	B	217	DNF	DNF
1984	(Switzerland) Claude Haldi	(West Germany) Altfrid Heger (Switzerland) Jean Krucker	Porsche 930	B	285	16th	2nd
1985	(France) WM Peugeot	(France) Roger Dorchy (France) Jean-Claude Andruet	WM P83B-Peugeot	C1	73	DNF	DNF
1986	(France) WM Secateva	(France) Roger Dorchy (France) Pascal Pessiot	WM P83B-Peugeot	C2	301	12th	3rd
1987	(Germany) Rothmans Porsche	(France) René Metge (Canada) Kees Nierop	Porsche 961	GTX	199	DNF	DNF
1988	(France) WM Secateva	(France) Roger Dorchy (France) Jean-Daniel Raulet	WM P87-Peugeot	C1	59	DNF	DNF
1993	(Switzerland) Scuderia Chicco d'Oro	(Switzerland) Olivier Haberthur (Switzerland) Charles Margueron	Porsche 911 Carrera RSR	GT	299	18th	4th
