= Jean-Daniel Raulet =

French racing driver (born 1946)

Jean-Daniel Raulet (born 24 March 1946) is a French former racing driver.
