= Welter Racing =

French sports car maker

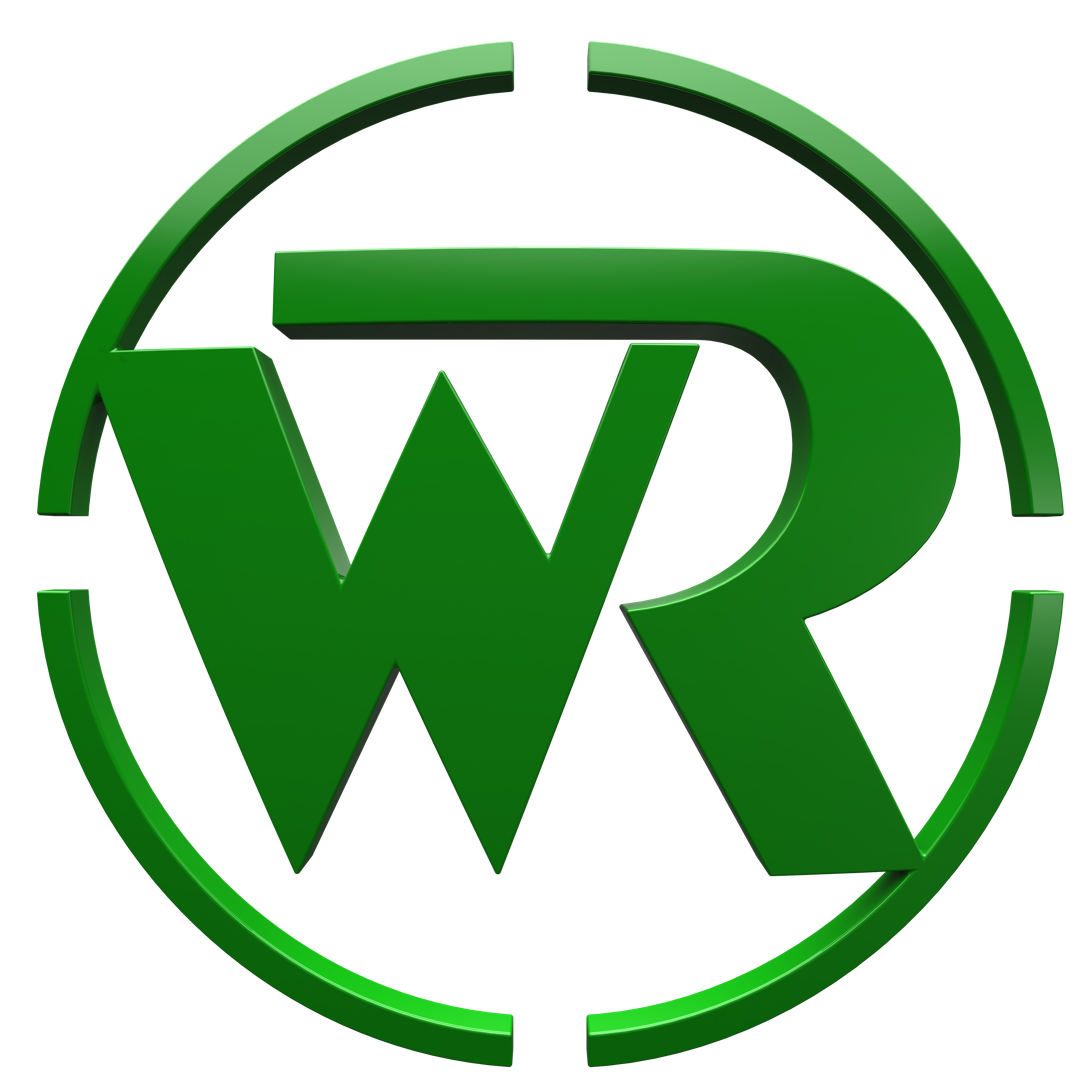
- Industry: Auto racing design and production
- Founded: 1990
- Founder: Gérard Welter
- Headquarters: France
- Website: www.welterracing.fr

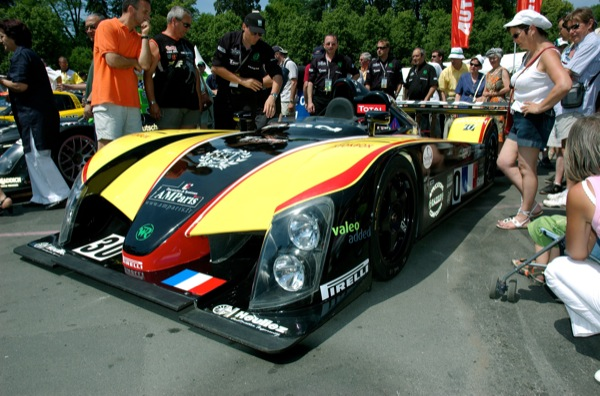
A Welter Racing prototype at the 2006 24 Hours of Le Mans.

Welter Racing is a French sports car maker that mainly enters in the 24 Hours of Le Mans, since 1990 under the name of Rachel and Gérard Welter, Peugeot's late head of design or Rachel Welter (his wife).

== History ==
Gérard Welter was well versed in endurance circuits, especially the 24 Hours of Le Mans. In 1993, Welter Racing claimed the Le Mans C3 class victory with its Peugeot 1.9 L turbocharged I4 powerplant entry that was driven by Patrick Gonin, Alain Lamouille and Bernard Santal. Aside from the 1993 class win, Welter Racing's career at La Sarthe also includes four second-place finishes and one third-place run as well as a sensational front row start in 1995 which led to a change of regulations for the following year.

The notable speed record was set in 1988 under the auspices of "Project 400". With that project, Welter set out to build the first car to do 400 km/h (249 mph) during the 24 Hours of Le Mans. That year, Welter's low-drag configuration WM Peugeot P88, including moving the radiators and intercoolers; combined with novel ducting, driven by Roger Dorchy, achieved 405 km/h (252 mph) on the Mulsanne Straight. Having struggled with reliability for the entire event, problems with the car for the whole weekend (turbocharger, cooling and electrical) finally ended their race.

The record was later protected with the addition of chicanes, which were built into the straight in 1990, which would prevent the ability of a car to easily reach 400 km/h (249 mph) again on the much shorter straights.

In 2008, WR unveiled a new LMP2 fitted with a Zytek engine, known as the WR2008.

Gérard Welter died on January 31, 2018, aged 75.
