= Roger Dorchy =

French racing driver (1944–2023)

Roger Albert Marcel Dorchy (15 September 1944 – 26 July 2023) was a French racing driver.

== Biography ==
Dorchy was born on 15 September 1944.

Dorchy was known for holding the top speed record at the 24 Hours of Le Mans, setting a top speed of 407 kilometres per hour (253 mph) with a WM-Peugeot at the end of the Mulsanne Straight at the 1988 24 Hours of Le Mans.

Dorchy died on 26 July 2023, at the age of 78.
