= 1992 Fuji 1000km =

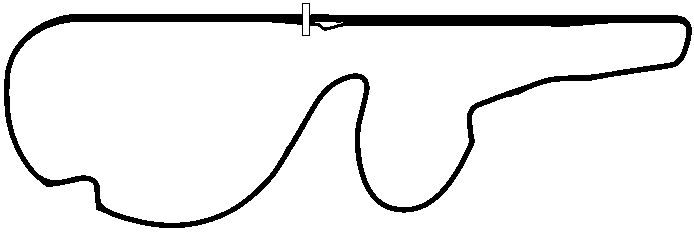
Layout of the Fuji Speedway (1987–2003)

The 1992 Fuji 1000 km was the fifth round of the 1992 All Japan Sports Prototype Car Endurance Championship season. It took place at Fuji Speedway, Japan on October 4, 1992. This race was the last 1000km race at the circuit until the 1999 Le Mans Fuji 1000km.

== Race results ==
Results are as follows:

Pos	Class	No	Team	Drivers	Chassis	Tyre	Laps
1	LD1	7	Toyota Team TOM'S	(United Kingdom) Geoff Lees (Netherlands) Jan Lammers	Toyota TS010	G	224
2	LD2	1	Nissan Motorsport	(Japan) Kazuyoshi Hoshino (Japan) Toshio Suzuki	Nissan R92CP	B	223
3	LD2	36	TOM'S	(France) Pierre-Henri Raphanel (Japan) Masanori Sekiya	Toyota 92C-V	B	222
4	LD2	39	Kitz Racing Team with SARD	(Austria) Roland Ratzenberger (United Kingdom) Eddie Irvine (Sweden) Eje Elgh	Toyota 92C-V	D	222
5	LD2	24	Nissan Motorsport	(Japan) Masahiro Hasemi (Japan) Masahiko Kageyama	Nissan R92CP	B	218
6	LD2	61	Team Take One	(Japan) Hideki Okada (Japan) Thomas Danielsson	Nissan R91CP	D	218
7	LD1	5	Mazdaspeed	(Japan) Takashi Yorino (Japan) Yojiro Terada	Mazda MXR-01	D	217
8	LD2	230	Pleasure Racing	(Japan) Tetsuji Shiratori (Japan) Masatomo Shimizu	Mazda 767B	D	158
DNF	LD2	27	From A Racing	(Italy) Mauro Martini (Japan) Katsutomo Kaneishi (Germany) Heinz-Harald Frentzen	Nissan R91CK	B	9
DNS	LD2	99	TOM'S	(South Africa) George Fouche (Sweden) Steven Andskar	Toyota 92C-V	B	

== Statistics ==
- Pole Position – #36 TOM'S 92C-V – 1:14.161
- Fastest Lap – #7 TOM'S TS010 – 1:18.487
- Winner's Race Time – 5:15:59.024
