= 1992 All Japan Sports Prototype Car Endurance Championship =

Seasons
- ← 1991 1993 (JGTC) →

The 1992 All Japan Sports Prototype Car Endurance Championship was the tenth and final season of the All Japan Sports Prototype Championship, which would be replaced by the All Japan Grand Touring Car Championship, as sportscar racing in the early 1990s changed drastically with the decline of prototypes. The C1 class champion was the #1 Nissan Motorsports Nissan R92CP driven by Kazuyoshi Hoshino and the C class champion was the #7 and #36 TOM'S Toyota TS010 driven by Geoff Lees.

== Schedule ==
All races were held in Japan.

Round	Race	Circuit	Date
1	International Suzuka 500 km	Suzuka Circuit	19 April
2	Fuji 1000 km	Fuji Speedway	4 May
3	Fuji 500 Miles	Fuji Speedway	26 July
4	SUGO International 500 km	Sportsland SUGO	13 September
5	Fuji 1000 km	Fuji Speedway	4 October
6	Inter-Challenge Cup Mine 500 km	Mine Circuit	1 November

== Entry list ==
Team	Make	Car	Engine	No.	Drivers	Tyre	Rounds
C1/LD2^{1}
Nissan Motorsports	Nissan	Nissan R92CP	Nissan VRH35Z 3.5 L Twin Turbo V8	1	(Japan) Kazuyoshi Hoshino	B	All
Nissan Motorsports	Nissan	Nissan R92CP	Nissan VRH35Z 3.5 L Twin Turbo V8	1	(Japan) Toshio Suzuki	B	1–5
Nissan Motorsports	Nissan	Nissan R92CP	Nissan VRH35Z 3.5 L Twin Turbo V8	1	(Japan) Takao Wada	B	6
Nissan Motorsports	Nissan	Nissan R92CP	Nissan VRH35Z 3.5 L Twin Turbo V8	24	(Japan) Masahiro Hasemi	B	All
Nissan Motorsports	Nissan	Nissan R92CP	Nissan VRH35Z 3.5 L Twin Turbo V8	24	(Japan) Masahiko Kageyama	B	All
Nissan Motorsports	Nissan	Nissan R92CP	Nissan VRH35Z 3.5 L Twin Turbo V8	24	(United States) Jeff Krosnoff	B	1–3
Mazdaspeed	Mazda	Mazda MXR-01	Mazda MV10 3.5 L V10	5	(Japan) Yojiro Terada	D	1
Mazdaspeed	Mazda	Mazda MXR-01	Mazda MV10 3.5 L V10	5	(Japan) Takashi Yorino	D	1
TOM'S	Toyota	Toyota 92C-V	Toyota R36V 3.6 L Turbo V8	8	(Japan) Masanori Sekiya	B	6
TOM'S	Toyota	Toyota 92C-V	Toyota R36V 3.6 L Turbo V8	8	(France) Pierre-Henri Raphanel	B	6
TOM'S	Toyota	Toyota 92C-V	Toyota R36V 3.6 L Turbo V8	36	(Japan) Masanori Sekiya	B	1–2, 4–5
TOM'S	Toyota	Toyota 92C-V	Toyota R36V 3.6 L Turbo V8	36	(France) Pierre-Henri Raphanel	B	1–2, 4–5
TOM'S	Toyota	Toyota 92C-V	Toyota R36V 3.6 L Turbo V8	99	(Sweden) Steven Andskär	B	All
TOM'S	Toyota	Toyota 92C-V	Toyota R36V 3.6 L Turbo V8	99	(South Africa) George Fouché	B	1–5
TOM'S	Toyota	Toyota 92C-V	Toyota R36V 3.6 L Turbo V8	99	(Brazil) Maurizio Sandro Sala	B	6
From A Racing	Nissan	Nissan R91CK	Nissan VRH35Z 3.5 L Twin Turbo V8	27	(Italy) Mauro Martini	B	All
From A Racing	Nissan	Nissan R91CK	Nissan VRH35Z 3.5 L Twin Turbo V8	27	(Germany) Volker Weidler	B	1–3
From A Racing	Nissan	Nissan R91CK	Nissan VRH35Z 3.5 L Twin Turbo V8	27	(Japan) Katsutomo Kaneishi	B	1–5
From A Racing	Nissan	Nissan R91CK	Nissan VRH35Z 3.5 L Twin Turbo V8	27	(Germany) Heinz-Harald Frentzen	B	5–6
Kitz Racing Team with SARD	Toyota	Toyota 92C-V	Toyota R36V 3.6 L Turbo V8	39	(Austria) Roland Ratzenberger	B	All
Kitz Racing Team with SARD	Toyota	Toyota 92C-V	Toyota R36V 3.6 L Turbo V8	39	(Sweden) Eje Elgh	B	All
Kitz Racing Team with SARD	Toyota	Toyota 92C-V	Toyota R36V 3.6 L Turbo V8	39	(United Kingdom) Eddie Irvine	B	2–3, 5–6
Team Take One	Nissan	Nissan R91CP	Nissan VRH35Z 3.5 L Twin Turbo V8	61	(Japan) Hideki Okada	D	All
Team Take One	Nissan	Nissan R91CP	Nissan VRH35Z 3.5 L Twin Turbo V8	61	(Sweden) Thomas Danielsson	D	All
Pleasure Racing	Mazda	Mazda 767B	Mazda RE13J 2.6 L 4-rotor	230	(Japan) Tetsuji Shiratori	D	1–5
Pleasure Racing	Mazda	Mazda 767B	Mazda RE13J 2.6 L 4-rotor	230	(Japan) Masatomo Shimizu	D	1–5
Pleasure Racing	Mazda	Mazda 767B	Mazda RE13J 2.6 L 4-rotor	230	(Japan) Seisaku Suzuki	D	2–3, 5
C/LD1^{1}
Navi Connection Racing	Alexel	Alexel Autorama C91	Ford DFR 3.5 L V8	3	(Japan) Kaoru Iida	D	2
Navi Connection Racing	Alexel	Alexel Autorama C91	Ford DFR 3.5 L V8	3	(Japan) Yoshiyasu Tachi	D	2
Mazdaspeed	Mazda	Mazda MXR-01	Mazda MV10 3.5 L V10	5	(Japan) Yojiro Terada	D	2–6
Mazdaspeed	Mazda	Mazda MXR-01	Mazda MV10 3.5 L V10	5	(Japan) Takashi Yorino	D	2–6
Mazdaspeed	Mazda	Mazda MXR-01	Mazda MV10 3.5 L V10	5	(Brazil) Maurizio Sandro Sala	D	2–3
Toyota Team TOM'S	Toyota	Toyota TS010	Toyota RV10 3.5 L V10	7	(United Kingdom) Geoff Lees	G	5
Toyota Team TOM'S	Toyota	Toyota TS010	Toyota RV10 3.5 L V10	7	(Netherlands) Jan Lammers	G	5
Toyota Team TOM'S	Toyota	Toyota TS010	Toyota RV10 3.5 L V10	7	(United Kingdom) Eddie Irvine	G	6
Toyota Team TOM'S	Toyota	Toyota TS010	Toyota RV10 3.5 L V10	7	(Canada) Jacques Villeneuve	G	6
Toyota Team TOM'S	Toyota	Toyota TS010	Toyota RV10 3.5 L V10	7	(Denmark) Tom Kristensen	G	6
Toyota Team TOM'S	Toyota	Toyota TS010	Toyota RV10 3.5 L V10	36	(United Kingdom) Geoff Lees	G	6
Toyota Team TOM'S	Toyota	Toyota TS010	Toyota RV10 3.5 L V10	36	(Netherlands) Jan Lammers	G	6
Nissan Motorsports	Nissan	Nissan NP35	Nissan VRT35 3.5 L V12	23	(Japan) Toshio Suzuki	G	6
Nissan Motorsports	Nissan	Nissan NP35	Nissan VRT35 3.5 L V12	23	(United States) Jeff Krosnoff	G	6

- ^1 – At Round 5 at Fuji Speedway, the C1 and C classes were renamed LD2 and LD1 respectively as the race was part of the Fuji Long Distance Series.

== Season results ==
Overall winner in bold. Season results as follows:

Round	Circuit	C1 Winning Team	C Winning Team
Round	Circuit	C1 Winning Drivers	C Winning Drivers
1	Suzuka Circuit	**#24 Nissan Motorsports Nissan R92CP**	Did Not Participate
1	Suzuka Circuit	**(Japan) Masahiro Hasemi** **(United States) Jeff Krosnoff** **(Japan) Masahiko Kageyama**	Did Not Participate
2	Mt. Fuji	**#1 Nissan Motorsports Nissan R92CP**	None
2	Mt. Fuji	**(Japan) Kazuyoshi Hoshino** **(Japan) Toshio Suzuki**	None
3	Mt. Fuji	**#1 Nissan Motorsports Nissan R92CP**	#5 Mazdaspeed Mazda MXR-01
3	Mt. Fuji	**(Japan) Kazuyoshi Hoshino** **(Japan) Toshio Suzuki**	(Japan) Yojiro Terada (Brazil) Maurizio Sandro Sala
4	Sportsland SUGO	**#1 Nissan Motorsports Nissan R92CP**	None
4	Sportsland SUGO	**(Japan) Kazuyoshi Hoshino** **(Japan) Toshio Suzuki**	None
5	Mt. Fuji; **Report**	#1 Nissan Motorsports Nissan R92CP	**#7 TOM'S Toyota TS010**
5	Mt. Fuji; **Report**	(Japan) Kazuyoshi Hoshino (Japan) Toshio Suzuki	**(United Kingdom) Geoff Lees** **(Netherlands) Jan Lammers**
6	Mine Circuit	#1 Nissan Motorsports Nissan R92CP	**#36 TOM'S Toyota TS010**
6	Mine Circuit	(Japan) Kazuyoshi Hoshino (Japan) Takao Wada	**(United Kingdom) Geoff Lees** **(Netherlands) Jan Lammers**

== Point Ranking ==
=== C1 Class (Top 5) ===
==== Drivers ====
Rank	Drivers	Number/Team	Points	Wins	Distance
1	(Japan) Kazuyoshi Hoshino	#1 Nissan Motorsports Nissan R92CP	103	5	2640.506 km
2	(Japan) Toshio Suzuki	#1 Nissan Motorsports Nissan R92CP	83	4	1696.02 km
3	(France) Pierre-Henri Raphanel	#8 TOM'S Toyota 92C-V #36 TOM'S Toyota 92C-V	73	0	2159.371 km
4	(Japan) Masanori Sekiya	#8 TOM'S Toyota 92C-V #36 TOM'S Toyota 92C-V	73	0	2033.509 km
5	(Japan) Masahiro Hasemi	#24 Nissan Motorsports Nissan R92CP	68	1	2054.971 km

=== C Class (Top 5) ===
==== Drivers ====
Rank	Drivers	Number/Team	Points	Wins	Distance
1	(United Kingdom) Geoff Lees	#7 TOM'S Toyota TS010 #36 TOM'S Toyota TS010	40	2	879.409 km
2	(Netherlands) Jan Lammers	#7 TOM'S Toyota TS010 #36 TOM'S Toyota TS010	40	2	623.913 km
3	(Japan) Takashi Yorino	#5 Mazdaspeed Mazda MXR-01	27	0	826.324 km
4	(Japan) Yojiro Terada	#5 Mazdaspeed Mazda MXR-01	27	1	613.288 km
5	(United Kingdom) Eddie Irvine	#7 TOM'S Toyota TS010	15	0	291.508 km
