= Eje Elgh =

Swedish racing driver and television reporter

Lars Eje Elgh (born 15 June 1953) is a Swedish racing driver and television reporter. He currently works as an expert commentator for Formula One in Sweden together with Janne Blomqvist. The two have worked together as Formula One commentators for a long time, first for TV4 and then for Viasat Motor when they took over the Formula One broadcasting in Sweden.

When he could get no further in Europe, Elgh tried his luck as a driver in Japan, racing both in Japanese Formula 2 / Formula 3000 and the Japanese Sports-Prototype Championship during its heyday in 1984–1988 and focusing on the latter from 1989, first with Team Schuppan Porsche 962, then with Tom's Toyota's 91CV/92CV. His racing record includes the European Formula Two Championship, the 24 Hours of Le Mans, and the Daytona 24 Hours.

== Career ==
In the 1970s, Elgh tried the classical way through the single-seater formulas from the Formula Super Vee towards Formula One. In the late 1970s he was regarded in Sweden as a great talent and was seen by Swedish motorsport journalists as a successor to the recently deceased Gunnar Nilsson and Ronnie Peterson. He was managed in the 1970s and 1980s by former racing driver Torsten Palm.

After the Formula Super Vee, Elgh came to England to race in the 1977 British Formula 3 Championships. Because most Formula 1 teams had their factories in England and because of the large concentration of talented drivers the British championship was regarded a stepping stone to Formula 1. During the 1977 season, Elgh raced for the Chevron Racing Team. He finished joint second in the BP Super Visco British F3 series and joint 5th in the Vandervell British F3 series.

By 1978, Elgh had stepped up to Formula 2 and went to Fred Opert Racing team at the start. The first season was quite successful for a rookie. In Pau, he was within second to Bruno Giacomelli and finished the races at Rouen-les-Essarts and Hockenheim in sixth. In the final standings of the championship, he was 11th.

In 1979, Elgh moved to Tiga Race Cars, winning his first F2 race at Enna-Pergusa. However, his best year in the Formula 2 Championship was the 1981 season. The year before he went to MM Mampe Team and had a disastrous first season, finishing only one race, in ninth. In 1981, he won in Vallelunga and finished second at Thruxton (behind team-mate Roberto Guerrero) and at the Nordschleife of Nürburgring (behind Thierry Boutsen) and third at Spa. He took third in the championship that year.

Despite these successes and a test drive for McLaren, he was not able to advance to the Formula 1 World Championship, so he sought new challenges in Asia. In the early 1980s, many European racers changed the Japanese motorsport scene. Elgh successfully drove there in the Japanese Formula 2 and Formula 3000 Championships and in the Japanese Endurance and Sports-Prototype Championships.

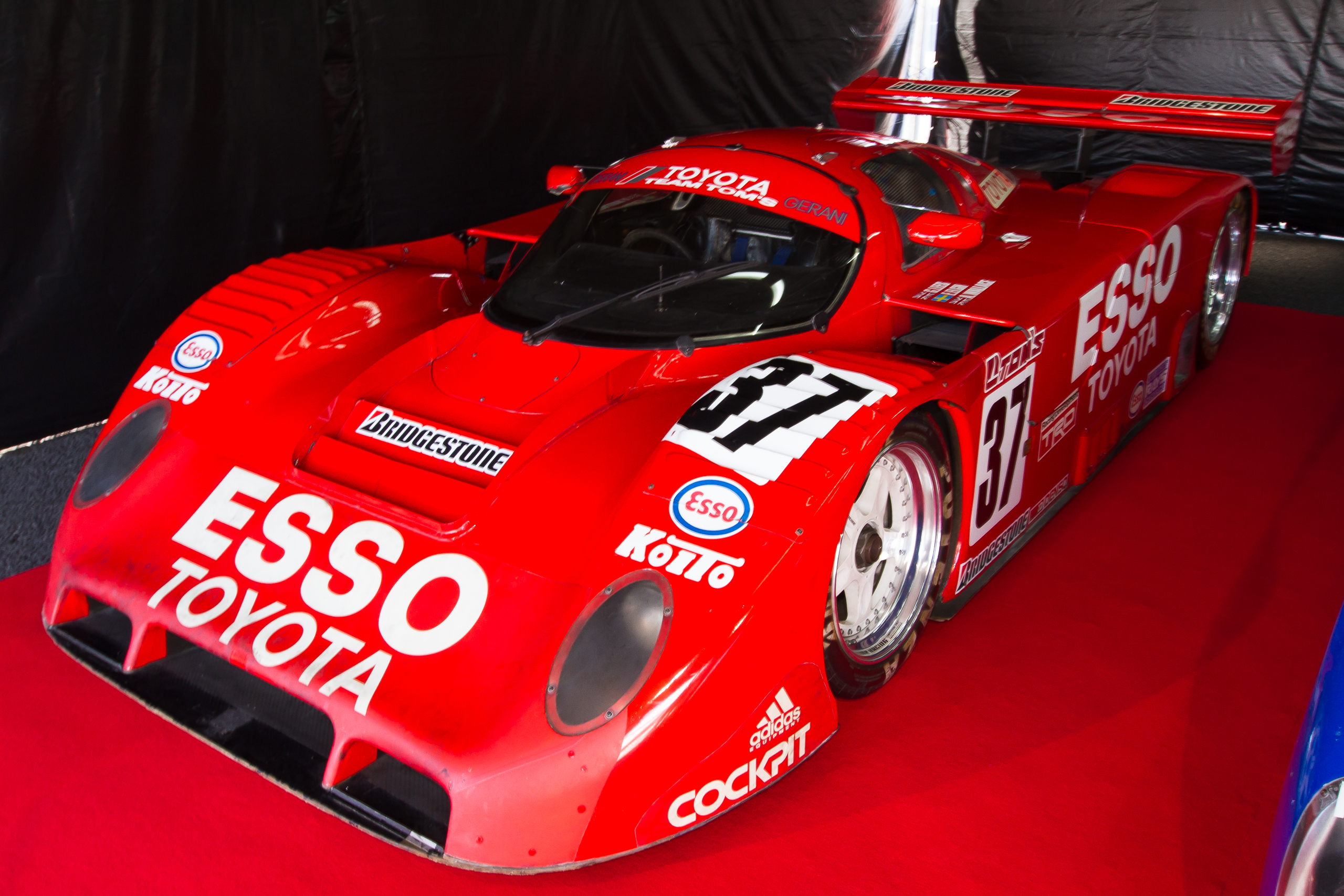
Elgh's Toyota 91C-V from 1991, being displayed FIA World Endurance Championship 2012 Rd.7 6 Hours of Fuji

In mid 80s, Elgh began touring and sports car career. He was works driver with Dome Motorsport and drove 1984 European Touring Car Championship races for the Volvo team of his compatriot Robert Kvist. Together with Ulf Granberg he was second in the 500 km race at Mugello.

By the end of his career in 1995, Elgh was closely associated with Domes and the sports car team of Toyota for which he was engaged almost continuously. Elgh was regarded as a strong development driver and a loyal team player who was at Toyota also at times when success eluded the team. He won his first long-distance race in 1985 with partner Geoff Lees at the 500-km race at Suzuka, a round of All Japan Sports Prototype Championship in a Dome 84C. His last of four successes in the Japanese Sports Car Championship was the overall win in the 500-km race from Sugo in 1991, again with Lees as a partner, this time in the Toyota 91C-V.

In 2006, Elgh shared a Motortecnica MAN 4x4 truck with Paolo Barilla and Matteo Marzotto in the Dakar rally.

Elgh also participated in the 2009 Dakar Rally where he was involved in a frightening crash. His Nissan Patrol GR Y61 fell down a 100-meter cliff and was completely destroyed, but Elgh and partner Paolo Barilla survived without any serious injuries.

In recent years, Elgh has competed in the Monaco Historique GP, in 2012 in a 1977 F3 Chevron B38-Toyota, the same car as he drove in British F3 in 1977. He was back in 2016 behind the wheel of a 1971 March 711-Cosworth Formula 1 car.

== Racing record ==
=== Career highlights ===
Season	Series	Position	Car	Team
1974	Formel Super Vau Gold Pokal	15th	Lola T252-Volkswagen	
1974	Formel Super Vau GTX Championship	21st	Lola T252-Volkswagen	
1975	Formel Super Vau Gold Pokal	3rd	Lola T320-Volkswagen; Lola T324-Volkswagen	
1976	Swedish Formula Three Championship	11th	Viking TH 1A-Toyota	Rotel Racing Team
1976	Formel Super Vau Gold Pokal	16th	Lola-Volkswagen	
1977	BARC British F3 Championship	2nd	Chevron B38-Toyota	Chevron Racing Team
1977	BRDC British F3 Championship	5th	Chevron B38-Toyota	Chevron Racing Team
1977	FIA European F3 Championship	12th	Chevron B40-Hart	Fred Opert Racing
1978	Swedish Formula Three Championship	9th		
1978	European Formula Two Championship	11th	Chevron B42-Hart	Fred Opert Racing
1978	FIA European F3 Championship	20th	Chevron B43-Toyota	Chevron Racing Team
1978–79	New Zealand Formula Pacific Championship	4th	March 782-Ford	Dick Bennetts Racing
1979	European Formula Two Championship	9th	March 792-BMW	Marlboro Team Tiga
1980	European Formula Two Championship	NC	Maurer MM80-BMW	MM Mampe Team
1981	European Formula Two Championship	3rd	Maurer MM81-BMW	Maurer Motorsport
1981	Japanese Formula 2 Championship	14th	Maurer MM81-BMW	Racing Mate Project Team; Team Equipe
1982	Japanese Formula 2 Championship	14th	March 802-BMW; AGS JH22-BMW	Tomei Jidousuya; Unico Racing
1983	Japanese Formula 2 Championship	9th	March 832-BMW	Team Le Mans
1983	All Japan Endurance Championship	14th	Dome RC83-Ford	Dome Motorsport
1984	Japanese Formula 2 Championship	4th	March 842-BMW	Autobacs Racing Team with Uchida
1984	All Japan Endurance Championship	41st	Dome RC83i-Ford; Dome 84C-Toyota	Dome Motorsport
1985	Japanese Formula 2 Championship	5th	March 85J-Mugen Honda	Speed Star Wheel Racing Team
1985	All Japan Endurance Championship	5th	Dome 84C-Toyota; Dome 85C-Toyota	Dome Company
1985	Fuji Grand Champion Series	4th	MCS 6-BMW	Speed Star Wheel Racing Team
1986	Japanese Formula 2 Championship	6th	March 86J-Yamaha	Speed Box Motor Sports
1986	All Japan Endurance Championship	20th	Dome RD84C-Toyota; Dome 86C-Toyota	Dome Company
1987	Japanese Formula 3000 Championship	11th	March 87B-Cosworth	Team Kitamura
1987	All Japan Endurance Championship	14th	Dome 87C-Toyota; Porsche 962C	Dome Company; Rothmans Porsche Team Schuppan
1987	Fuji Grand Champion Series	15th	MCS 7-Ford	Sundai Spilit Team
1987	All Japan Touring Car Championship	8th	Rover Vitesse; Toyota Supra Turbo	Sundai Spilit Team; TOM's Toyota
1988	Japanese Formula 3000 Championship	NC	Lola T88/50-Mugen Ogawa	Sundai Spilit Team
1988	All Japan Endurance Championship	7th	Porsche 962C	Rothmans Porsche Team Schuppan
1988	Fuji Long Distance Series	5th	Porsche 962C	Rothmans Porsche Team Schuppan
1988	FIA World Endurance Championship	58th	Porsche 962C	Takefuji Team Schuppan
1988	Fuji Grand Champion Series	10th	R&D 88Q-Mazda	Sundai Spilit Team
1989	All Japan Endurance Championship	5th	Porsche 962C	Omron Racing
1989	All Japan Grand Champion Series	8th	R&D 88Q-Mazda	Sundai Spilit Team
1990	FIA World Endurance Championship	NC	Porsche 962C	Team Davey; Brun Motorsport; Porsche Kremer Racing
1990	All Japan Endurance Championship	17th	Porsche 962C	Omron Racing
1991	FIA World Endurance Championship	47th	Porsche 962C	Courage Compétition; Porsche Kremer Racing; Team Salamin Primagaz
1991	All Japan Endurance Championship	12th	Toyota 91C-V	Toyota Team TOM'S
1992	All Japan Endurance Championship	15th	Toyota 92C-V	Kitz Racing Team with SARD
1992	IMSA Camel GTP Championship	17th	Porsche 962	Team 0123

=== Complete European Formula Two Championship results ===
(key) (Races in bold indicate pole position; races in italics indicate fastest lap)

Year	Entrant	Chassis	Engine	1	2	3	4	5	6	7	8	9	10	11	12	13	Pos.	Pts
1977	Fred Opert Racing	Chevron B40	Hart	SIL	THR	HOC	NÜR	VAL	PAU	MUG	ROU	NOG	PER	MIS	EST; 8	DON	NC	0
1978	Fred Opert Racing	Chevron B42	Hart	THR; DNQ	HOC; DNQ	NÜR; 9	PAU; 2	MUG; 13	VAL; DNQ	ROU; 6	DON; Ret	NOG; 13	PER; Ret	MIS; DNQ	HOC; 6		11th	8
1979	Marlboro Team Tiga	March 792	BMW	SIL; Ret	HOC; DSQ	THR; Ret	NÜR; 12	VAL; 9	MUG; 3	PAU; Ret	HOC; 10	ZAN; 6	PER; 1	MIS; Ret	DON; 5		9th	16
1980	MM Mampe Team	Maurer MM80	BMW	THR; Ret	HOC; Ret	NÜR; Ret	VAL; Ret	PAU	SIL	ZOL	MUG	ZAN	PER	MIS	HOC; Ret		NC	0
1981	Maurer Motorsport	Maurer MM81	BMW	SIL; 18	HOC; 4	THR; 2	NÜR; 2	**VAL**; 1	MUG; 4	PAU; 5	PER; 5	SPA; 3	DON; 7	MIS; Ret	MAN; 17		3rd	35
1982	Maurer Motorsport	Maurer MM82	BMW	SIL	HOC	THR	NÜR; 17	MUG	VAL	PAU	SPA	HOC	DON				NC	0
1982	Horag Racing	March 822	BMW											MAN; Ret	PER	MIS	NC	0

=== 24 Hours of Le Mans results ===
Year	Team	Co-Drivers	Car	Class	Laps	Pos.	Class Pos.
1982	(United Kingdom) March Racing	(United States) Jeff Wood (Belgium) Patrick Nève	March 82G-Chevrolet	C	78	DNF	DNF
1984	(Japan) Uchida Dome Racing Team	(Sweden) Stanley Dickens	Dome RC83-Ford Cosworth	C1	-	DNS	DNS
1985	(Japan) Dome Team	(United Kingdom) Geoff Lees (Japan) Toshio Suzuki	Dome Team 85C-L-Toyota	C1	141	DNF	DNF
1986	(Japan) Dome Co. Ltd.	(Italy) Beppe Gabbiani (Japan) Toshio Suzuki	Dome Team 86C-L-Toyota	C1	296	NC	NC
1987	(Japan) Toyota Team TOM'S	(Australia) Alan Jones (United Kingdom) Geoff Lees	Toyota 87C-L	C1	19	DNF	DNF
1988	(Australia) Takefuji Schuppan Racing Team	(United Kingdom) Brian Redman (France) Jean-Pierre Jarier	Porsche 962C	C1	359	10th	10th
1989	(Australia) Team Schuppan	(Australia) Vern Schuppan (Australia) Gary Brabham	Porsche 962C	C1	321	13th	10th
1990	(Australia) Team Schuppan	(Sweden) Thomas Danielsson (Australia) Tomas Mezera	Porsche TS962	C1	326	15th	15th
1991	(Switzerland) Team Salamin Primagaz (Australia) Team Schuppan	(Austria) Roland Ratzenberger (United Kingdom) Will Hoy	Porsche 962C	C2	202	DNF	DNF
1992	(Japan) Toyota Team TOM'S (Japan) Kitz Racing Team with SARD	(Austria) Roland Ratzenberger (United Kingdom) Eddie Irvine	Toyota 92C-V	C2	321	9th	**2nd**
1993	(Japan) Nisso Trust Racing Team	(South Africa) George Fouché (Sweden) Steven Andskär	Toyota 93C-V	C2	358	6th	**2nd**

=== Daytona 24 Hours results ===
Year	Team	Co-Drivers	Car	Class	Laps	Pos.	Class Pos.
1992	(Australia) Team 0123	(United States) Hurley Haywood (Austria) Roland Ratzenberger (United States) Scott Brayton	Porsche 962	GTP	749	**3rd**	**2nd**
