= Toyota 92C-V =

Toyota 92C-V Toyota 93C-V Toyota 94C-V
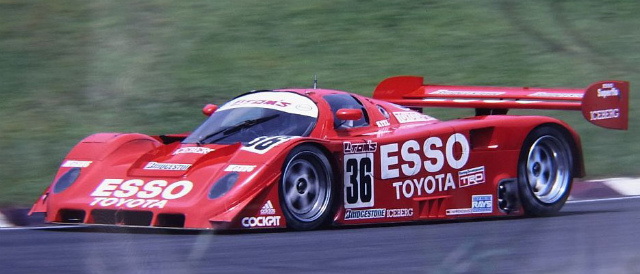
- The No. 36 92C-V campained by Team Tom's during the 1992 All Japan Sports Prototype Championship
- Category: Group C2, LMP1
- Constructor: Toyota

Technical specifications
- Chassis: Carbon fiber and aluminium monocoque
- Length: 4650 mm
- Width: 2000 mm
- Height: 1000 mm
- Engine: Toyota R36V 3.6 liter (3,576cc) 90° V8, twin turbocharged
- Transmission: 5-speed manual
- Fuel: Castrol; Esso
- Tyres: Bridgestone; Dunlop

Competition history
- Notable entrants: Toyota Team Tom's; SARD Co. Ltd. Trust Racing Team
- Debut: 1992 500 km of Suzuka

The Toyota 92C-V was a prototype racing car built by Toyota as a Group C car, and later as an LMP car. It raced in the 24 Hours of Le Mans for three years. It also took part in the final year of the All Japan Sports Prototype Championship during the 1992 season.

Although with different names, the same two cars were used at the 24 Hours of Le Mans for three years, and simply updated each year. A third chassis was used for the 1992 All Japan Sports Prototype Championship.

== 1992 ==
Three cars were entered into the 1992 All Japan Sports Prototype Championship. The cars took part in every race. The 92C-V managed 4 top-three finishes out of the 6 races, but could not manage a win.

Two cars were entered into the 1992 24 Hours of Le Mans, with the numbers #34 and #35. The cars qualified 11th and 15th overall, respectively. The 92C-Vs were the only cars in the Group C2 class to start the race. Both cars finished. The #34 car finished in 9th place overall. However, the #35 car managed to improve its position to 5th overall. It completed 346 laps, 6 laps behind the winner.

== 1993 ==
The two cars were entered into the 1993 race. The cars were updated and renamed the Toyota 93C-V. They had the numbers #22 and #25. Roland Ratzenberger driving the #22 car qualified 10th overall (4th in C2 category), while George Fouché driving the #25 car qualified 12th (6th in C2 category). Both cars completed the race, with Toyota again achieving a 1-2 finish in the C2 Category; 5th and 6th overall. The #22 car completed 363 laps, 12 laps behind the winning Peugeot 905. The #25 car was a further 5 laps behind.

== 1994 ==
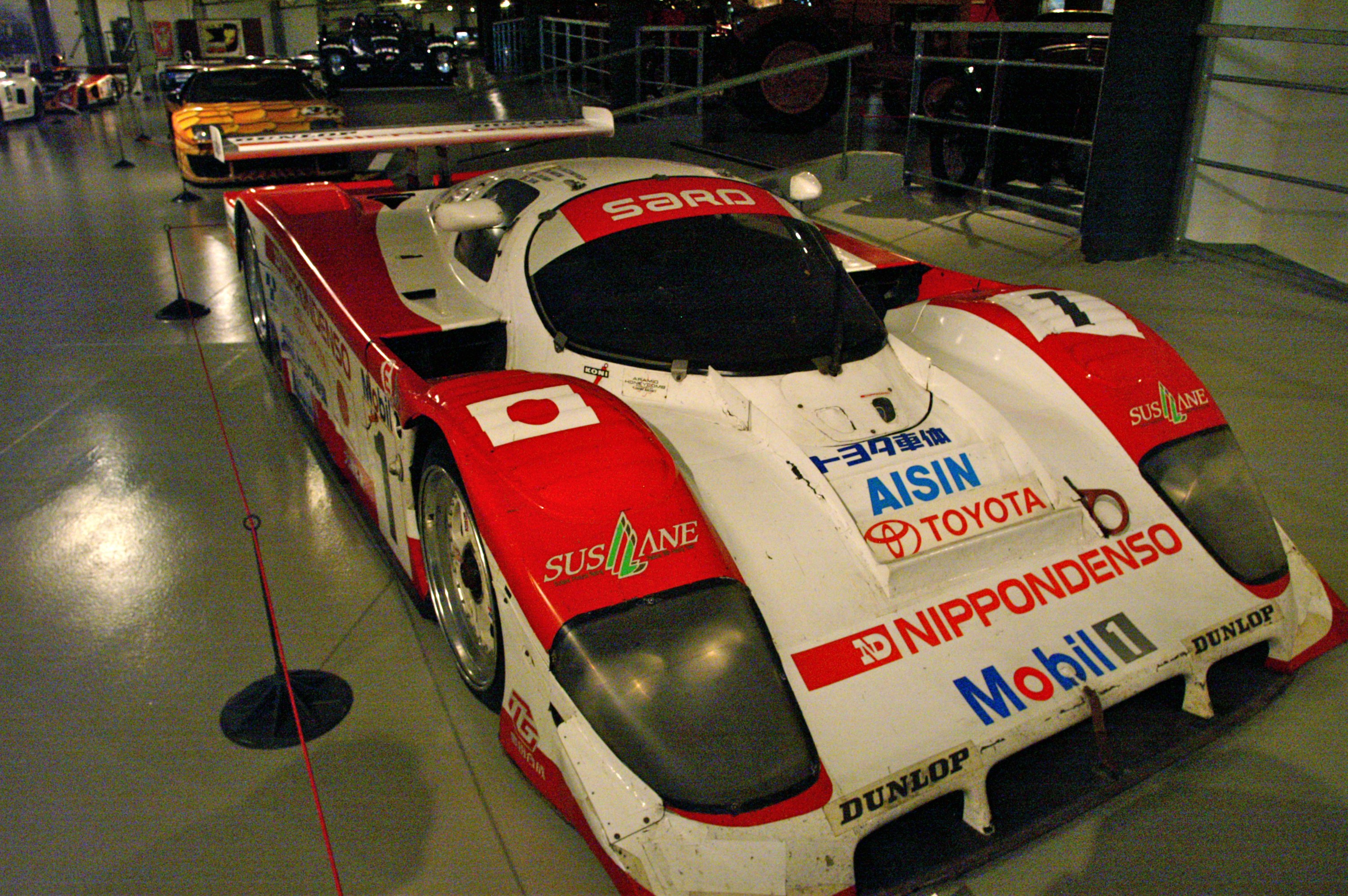
The 94C-V

With the demise of Group C, Toyota further updated the cars and ran them as the Toyota 94C-V under the new LMP1 class for 1994. The two cars were entered with the numbers #1 and #4. Roland Ratzenberger, Mauro Martini, and Jeff Krosnoff were intended to be the drivers for the #1 car. However, Roland had suffered a fatal accident during the 1994 San Marino Grand Prix weekend. Eddie Irvine substituted for Ratzenberger, but Ratzenberger's name was left on the car as a tribute. The Nisso-94C-V with starting number 4 was driven by Steven Andskär, George Fouché, and Bob Wollek, who made another attempt at overall victory.

In training, it became clear that Toyota had underestimated the opposition. The test day on May 8 was skipped and the well-prepared Courage C32 were equal in qualifying training. Nevertheless, the SARD-94C-V led the race for a long time and was in the lead by a lap with 90 minutes remaining in the race when transmission problems forced the car into the pits. This began a long series of late Toyota failures, which many experts have already called a curse. This failure series only ended in 2018, when Toyota clinched its first overall victory. In 1994 the transmission problems prevented the overall victory. Eddie Irvine was able to close the gap after the problem was fixed, but finished one lap behind the eventual winning Dauer 962 Le Mans. The second Toyota was classified in fourth place.

Mauro Martini's qualifying lap put the #1 car in 4th (3rd in the LMP1 class) on the starting grid, while George Fouché qualified the #4 car into 8th (5th in the LMP1 class). Both cars finished, and for the third consecutive year, achieved a 1-2 finish in their class. The #1 car finished 2nd overall, 1 lap behind the winner. The #4 car finished 4th overall, 16 laps behind the winner.

The 94C-V also participated in the 1994 1000 km of Suzuka, being driven by Mauro Martini and Jeff Krosnoff. It retired from the race due to damage caused by an accident.
