= Toyota RV10 engine =

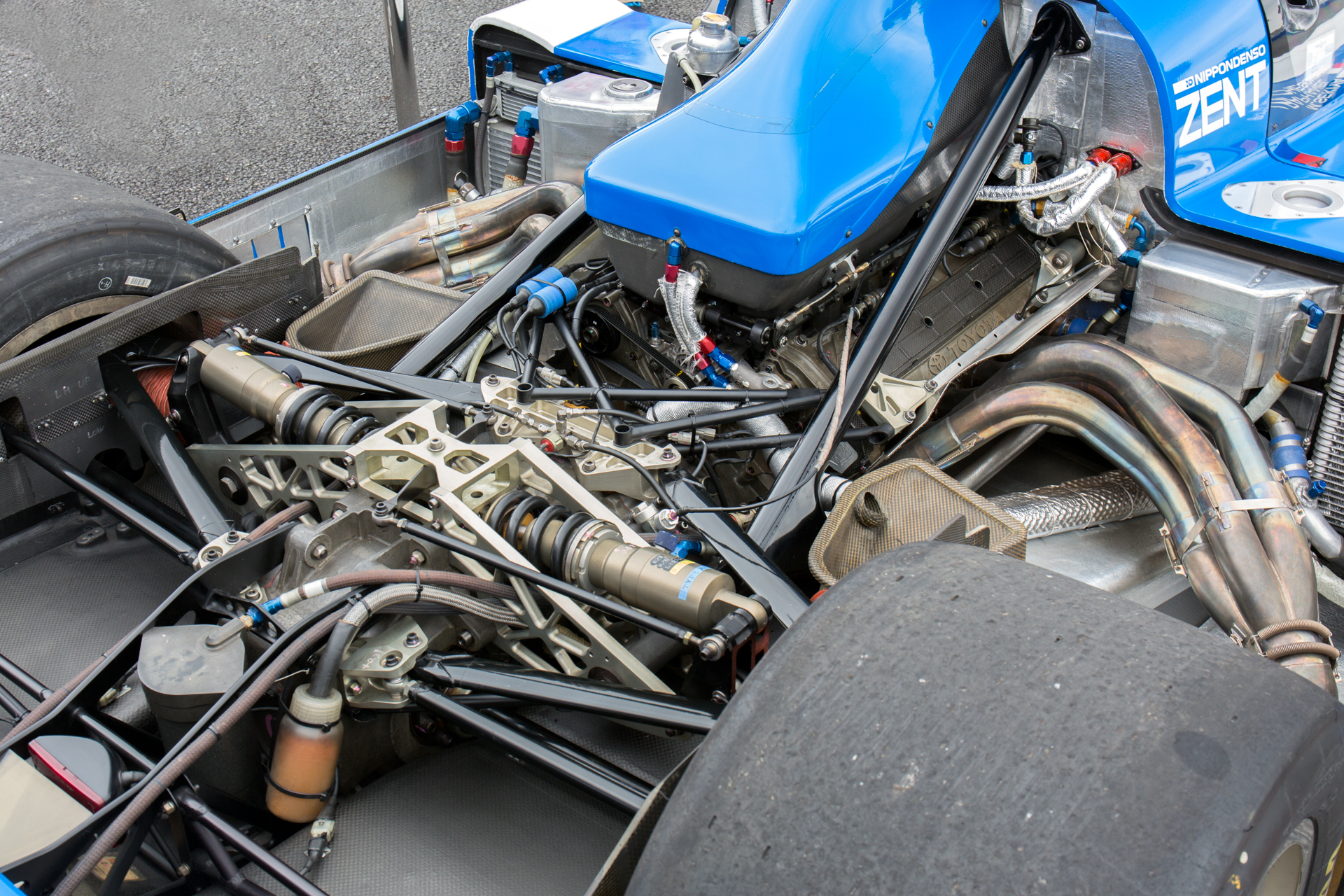

Overview
- Manufacturer: Toyota
- Production: 1991–1993

Layout
- Configuration: 72° V10
- Displacement: 3.5 L (3,495 cc)
- Cylinder bore: 86 mm (3.39 in)
- Piston stroke: 60.2 mm (2.37 in)
- Valvetrain: 50-valve (five-valves per cylinder), DOHC

Combustion
- Fuel system: Electronic fuel injection
- Fuel type: Gasoline
- Oil system: Dry sump
- Cooling system: Water-cooled

Output
- Power output: 600–750 hp (447–559 kW; 608–760 PS)
- Torque output: 330–400 lb⋅ft (447–542 N⋅m)

Chronology
- Successor: Toyota R32V/R36V engine

The Toyota RV10 engine is a 72-degree, four-stroke, naturally-aspirated, V10 racing engine, designed, developed and produced by Toyota, for their Toyota TS010 Group C sports prototype race car, between 1991 and 1993.

== Background ==
Due to rule changes in the World Sportscar Championship for 1992, Toyota was forced to replace their previous series of Group C engines, dubbed the R32-V and R36-V, which were 3.6L twin-turbocharged V8 engine units. The new rules required a 3.5L naturally aspirated engine to be used, similar to Formula One engine regulations at the time. Thus, in 1991, Toyota completed its RV10 engines and began early testing.

Due to the change in engines, a whole new chassis was also necessary in order to better handle the new V10. Former Tom Walkinshaw Racing designer Tony Southgate was in charge of designing the car that became the TS010, featuring a more aerodynamic and longer body than the C-V series of sportscars.

== Applications ==
- Toyota TS010
