= Toyota TS010 =

Group C racing car built by Toyota

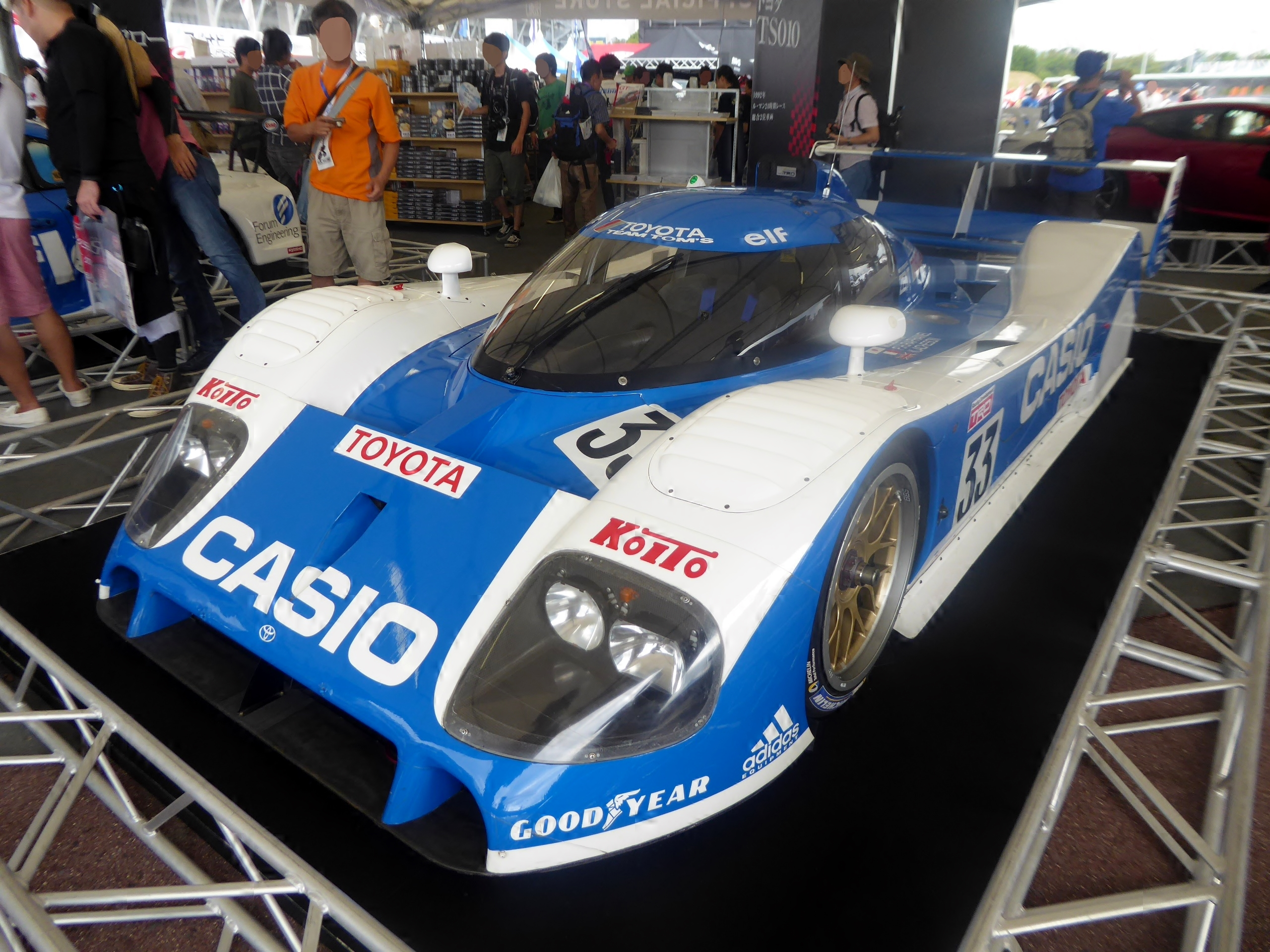
- Category: Group C sports prototype
- Constructor: Toyota (Tom's)
- Designer(s): Tony Southgate
- Successor: Toyota GT-One

Technical specifications
- Suspension (front): Double wishbone suspension, coil-spring over damper
- Suspension (rear): Double wishbone suspension, coil-spring over damper
- Engine: Toyota RV10 3500 cc V10. NA, mid-mounted.
- Transmission: Manual transmission
- Fuel: Elf
- Tyres: Goodyear (1992); Michelin (1993)

Competition history
- Notable entrants: (Japan) Toyota Team Tom's
- Notable drivers: (United Kingdom) Geoff Lees (United Kingdom) Andy Wallace (United Kingdom) Eddie Irvine (United Kingdom) Kenny Acheson (France) Pierre-Henri Raphanel (Japan) Hitoshi Ogawa (Japan) Masanori Sekiya (Japan) Toshio Suzuki (Netherlands) Jan Lammers (Italy) Teo Fabi (Australia) David Brabham (Denmark) Tom Kristensen (Canada) Jacques Villeneuve (Argentina) Juan Manuel Fangio II
- Debut: 1991 430 km of Autopolis
- Last season: 1993
Races	Wins	Poles	F/Laps
10	3	0	4
- Constructors' Championships: 1 (1992 JSPC C Class)
- Drivers' Championships: 1 (1992 JSPC C Class)

The Toyota TS010 was a Group C racing car built by Toyota for the Sportscar World Championship, All Japan Sports Prototype Championship, and the 24 Hours of Le Mans.

== History ==
Due to rule changes in the World Sportscar Championship for 1992, Toyota was forced to replace their previous series of Group C sportscars, known as C-V, which used the R36V 3.6L twin turbocharged V8. The new rules required a 3.5L naturally aspirated engine to be used. Thus in 1991 Toyota completed their RV10 engines and began early testing.

Due to the change in engines, a whole new chassis was also necessary in order to better handle the new V10. Former Tom Walkinshaw Racing designer Tony Southgate was in charge of designing the car that became the TS010, featuring a more aerodynamic and longer body than the C-V series of sportscars. TS010 #002 would be completed towards the end of 1991, and Toyota chose to debut the car at the final round of the 1991 WSC season at Autopolis. The car, driven by Britons Geoff Lees and Andy Wallace and run by half English, half Japanese squad Tom's, finished 6th overall, only three laps behind the winning Mercedes-Benz.

For the start of the 1992 season, Toyota's main competitors came in the form of the Peugeot 905, which had been launched late in 1990. At the start of the season in Monza, four chassis had been completed. Toyota chose to run two cars while a third spare car would run in practice only to help the team prepare for the races. At Monza, Toyota was able to secure its first victory after the leading Peugeot crashed out, with chassis #002 being among the few cars to finish the rain-soaked race in the hands of Geoff Lees and Hitoshi Ogawa. However, TS010 #004 was badly damaged in an accident early in the race.

At the second round of the season, both TS010's failed to finish due to problems. However at the 24 Hours of Le Mans, with the completion of fresh chassis #005 and #006, Toyota entered three cars in the event. Two were able to finish, with one taking 2nd place, 6 laps behind the winning Peugeot. The other finisher managed 8th overall.

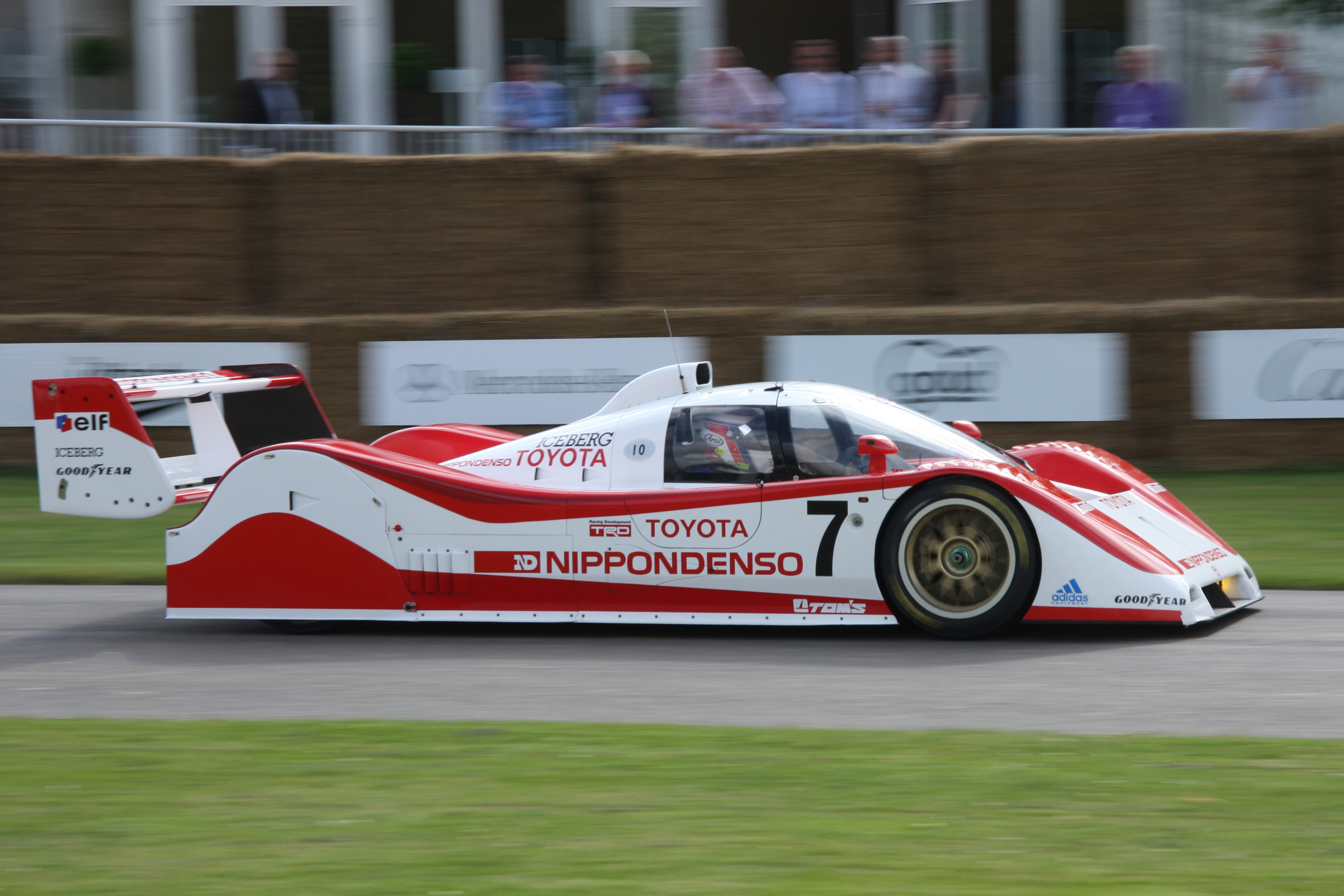
A TS010 at Goodwood

For the next two races at Donington Park and Toyota's home race at Suzuka Circuit, the TS010 was only able to finish behind the dominating Peugeots, each time having the second TS010 failing to finish. At the final round at Circuit de Nevers Magny-Cours, both TS010s would finish, taking 3rd and 4th behind Peugeot once again. With the season over, Toyota would take 2nd in the teams championship, although they only managed to earn approximately half the points that Peugeot won.

After the race at Suzuka, Toyota left a single TS010 in Japan to compete in the final two rounds of the All Japan Sports Prototype Championship. The TS010 took victory at Fuji Speedway, then was joined by a second TS010 after the World Sportscar Championship had ended. The team took 1st and 4th, defeating factory efforts from Nissan and Mazda. These two wins secured Toyota a manufacturer's championship in the Group C category in JSPC.

For 1993, both the World Sportscar Championship and All Japan Sports Prototype Championships were cancelled, leaving the TS010s with nowhere to race except at that year's 24 Hours of Le Mans. Another three chassis would be built specifically for this race, numbered #007, #008, and #009. Future Formula One driver Eddie Irvine, Masanori Sekiya, and Toshio Suzuki would bring a TS010 home in 4th overall, behind the trio of Peugeots. A second TS010 would take 8th, while the third car failed to finish. Following this race, with no place to compete, the TS010 was officially retired and Toyota concentrated on their IMSA efforts in the United States.
