= Mazda MXR-01 =

Mazda MXR-01 (MX-R01)
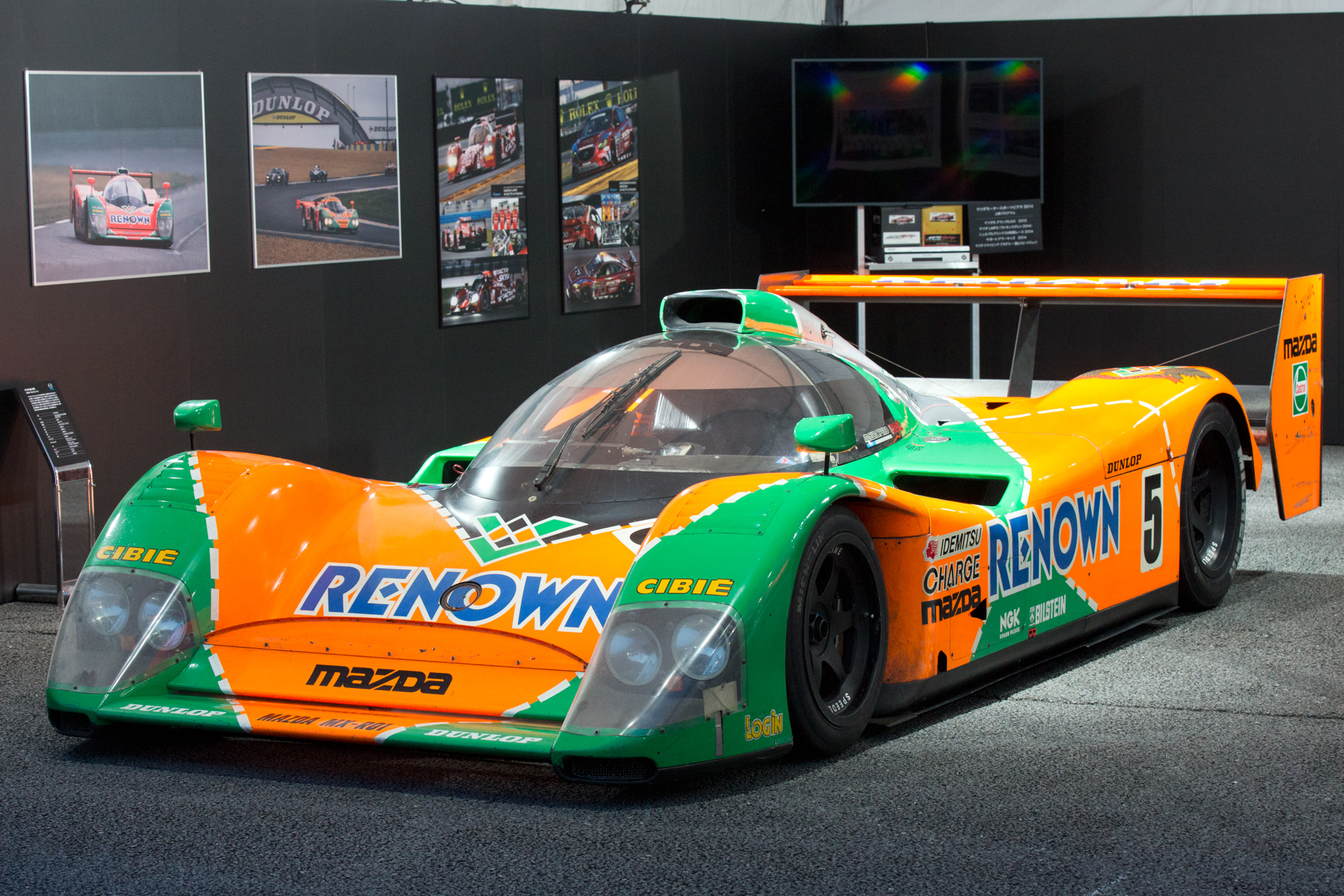

Overview
- Manufacturer: Mazda (Tom Walkinshaw Racing)
- Production: 1992
- Designer: Nigel Stroud

Body and chassis
- Class: Group C sports prototype
- Body style: 2-door Coupé
- Layout: RMR layout
- Related: Jaguar XJR-14

Powertrain
- Engine: Judd GV10 derived 3.5 L (214 cu in) Mazda MV10 V10
- Transmission: TWR 6-speed manual

Dimensions
- Curb weight: 750 kg (1,653.5 lb) or more

Chronology
- Predecessor: Mazda 787B

The Mazda MXR-01 is a Group C sports prototype that was used by Mazda's factory team Mazdaspeed in the 1992 World Sportscar Championship season. It would be the final Mazda entry in sports car racing since the inception of its Le Mans project in 1983. It was based on the Jaguar XJR-14.

== Development ==
Following Mazda's success in winning the 1991 24 Hours of Le Mans with its rotary powered 787B, Mazda had hoped to continue in sportscar racing and prove that its one win was not a fluke. However, with the reorganizing of the World Sportscar Championship in 1991 by the FIA, Mazda found itself with a problem in that its rotary engines were now ineligible. Instead, teams would be required to use technologically advanced 3.5L powerplants similar to those used in Formula One. Mazda, not having had many racing engines outside of its rotaries, decided that the cost of developing an entirely different engine was not worth it, especially with budgetary concerns within the company. At the same time, if Mazda was to use a V10 powerplant, it would be required to build an entirely different car, since the 787B could never hold a V10.

Thus, Mazda came to the decision of buying an existing V10 engine. The company turned to Judd (Engine Developments), who had developed the GV10 3.5L V10 for Formula One in 1991, and arranged a deal in which the Judd engines would be badged as Mazdas, carrying the name MV10.

For a new chassis, Mazda also turned to an existing design, this time going to Tom Walkinshaw Racing (TWR), who had worked with Jaguar until it dropped out of sportscar racing at the end of 1991. Jaguar's final entry, the XJR-14, was offered by TWR to customers for 1992, and Mazda jumped at the opportunity to use the car which helped win the 1991 championship for Jaguar. Again, the car would be rebadged and renamed as the Mazda MXR-01 carrying some minor modifications carried out by Nigel Stroud such as different side view mirrors and the addition of new headlamps.

Unfortunately, although the XJR-14 was the 1991 champion, it had not been updated since the end of that season, and Mazda had neither the technical understanding of the XJR-14 nor the cash flow to continually upgrade their rebadged MXR-01 on the same scale as Peugeot and Toyota were able to do in 1992. The Judd powerplant was also considerably underpowered in comparison to the other factory teams. As a result, the MXR-01 would race until the end of its career mostly unmodified.

== Racing history ==
With the MXR-01, Mazda was able to successfully finish third in the teams' championship of the 1992 World Sportscar Championship season, with a best result of second in the 500km of Silverstone. At Le Mans the team was able to briefly lead the race at various parts of the first hours in front of the dominant Peugeot squad before finishing an honourable 4th. Throughout the season the team ran only a single-car effort, with the exception being two cars for Le Mans.

In Japan, Mazdaspeed campaigned a single MXR-01 in the All Japan Sports Prototype Championship, which was not very successful. Mazda finished 2nd in the constructor's championship for the series, which is respectable considering the power disadvantage it had compared to Toyota and Nissan.

After the 1993 seasons of both the WSC and JSPC were cancelled, and with the RX-792P shutting down after the 1992 IMSA season, Mazda found itself out of sportscar racing altogether.

== Chassis ==
A total of five MXR-01s were built by Tom Walkinshaw Racing for use by Mazda.

- MXR-01 #001 - Raced exclusively in the JSPC
- MXR-01 #002 - Spare used as a test car at Le Mans
- MXR-01 #003 - Spare used as a test car at Le Mans
- MXR-01 #004 - Ran entire WSC schedule
- MXR-01 #005 - Second car for Le Mans only.
