= TOM'S =

Japanese racing team

TOM'S Inc.
- Industry: Automobile tuning & parts manufacturer for street and motorsports
- Founded: February 20, 1974; 52 years ago
- Founder: Nobuhide Tachi
- Headquarters: Setagaya, Tokyo, Japan
- Key people: Isao Tanimoto (President and Representative Director)
- Products: Automobile tuning and racing products
- Website: global.tomsracing.co.jp

TOM'S Inc. (株式会社トムス, Kabushiki-gaisha Tomusu) is an automotive aftermarket parts manufacturer and tuner of Toyota and Lexus vehicles, as well as a factory-backed racing team. The TOM'S head office is located in Tokyo, Japan.

TOM'S most prominently produces aftermarket parts for current Toyota vehicles, and has also created its own special edition of certain current Lexus models.

In motorsport, the company is currently heavily involved with Super GT, Super Formula and Super Formula Lights. TOM'S Racing has won the Japanese Formula 3 Championship 21 times, the Super GT series 11 times, the Super Formula Championship six times, and the Super Formula Lights series four times.

== History ==
The name stands for Tachi Oiwa Motor Sport, as the company was established in 1974 by Nobuhide Tachi and Kiyoshi Oiwa. Despite an oil crisis at the time, the two were able to show productive results and a healthy development of motorsports for Toyota. With the support of Toyota, TOM'S went into business in 1974.

In 1975 the Toyota Motor Corporation officially recognized TOM'S as an authorized tuning shop. In 1978, the firm opened a garage in the Tama area of Tokyo. TOM'S entered the Japanese Formula 3 discipline as an engine tuner in 1981.

In 1987, TOM'S expanded to Hingham in Norfolk, England, setting up as TOM'S GB LIMITED. The factory initially housed the TOM'S engine shops and Glenn Waters's Formula 3 team before expanding to running the Sportscar World Championship and BTCC programs. In 1992 TOM'S attempted to lure Toyota into F1 by embarking on a Formula 1 feasibility study which included the establishment of a 40,000 sq. ft. R&D center. The design of the R&D center was overseen by John Barnard and a TOM'S F1 car was designed (dubbed the 011F) but never built . After Toyota rejected the idea of a Formula 1 entry, TOM'S sold the Norfolk factory to Volkswagen in 1998 and left the European market .

In 1993, TOM'S produced vehicles for the Japanese Formula 3000. In 1994, the firm marked its 20th anniversary with "TOM'S Angel T01", a commemorative model. 1995 saw the lightweight sports car series T101, T082, and T020. In 2003, TOM'S modified vehicles entered the All Japan F3 Championship group of the All Japan GT Championship.

== List of complete cars ==
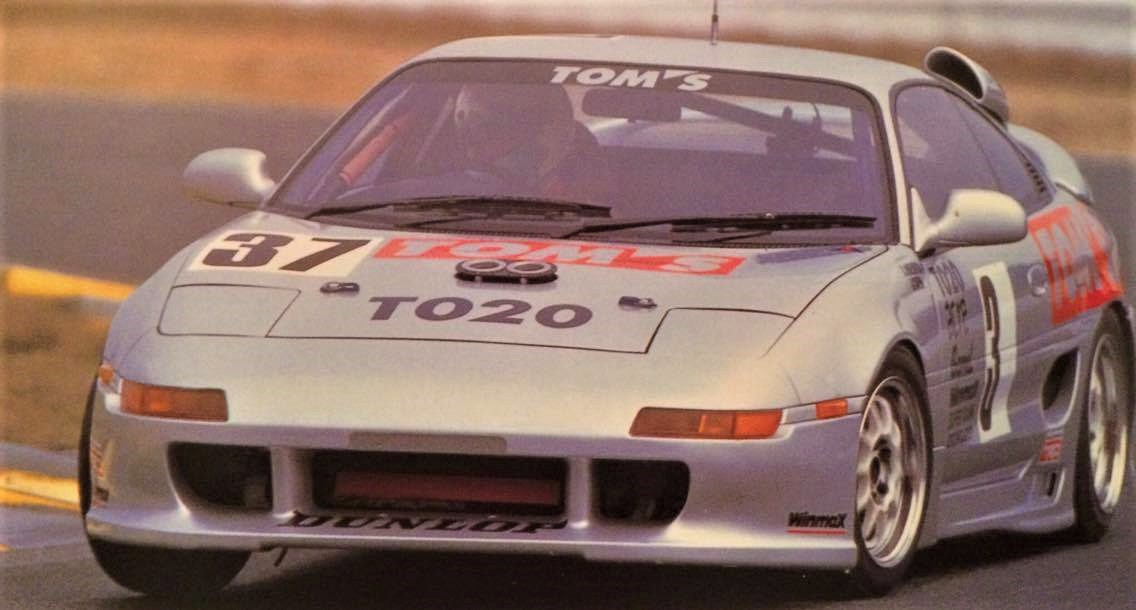
TOM'S T020 (MR2) complete car

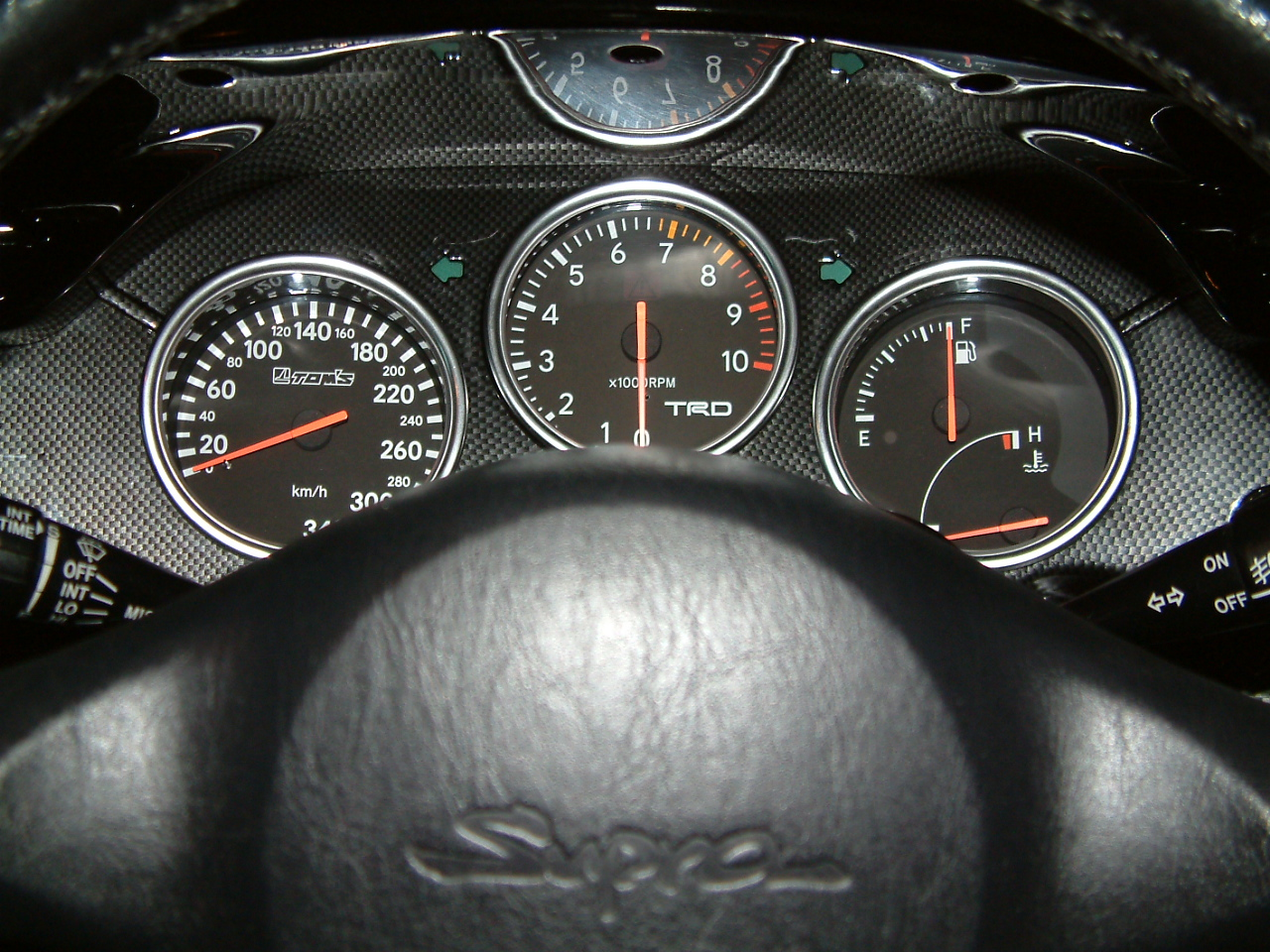
TOM'S Supra 340kmh speedometer

- Z20 Soarer 'C5'
- A70 Supra 'C5'
- F070M Celsior (Lexus LS 400/430)
- F070 Celsior (Lexus LS 400/430)
- Z382 Soarer (Lexus SC)
- S741 Majesta
- S630 Aristo
- S740 Athlete
- S970 Athlete
- Toyota Blade
- S972 Estate
- X540 Chaser
- E910 Altezza (Lexus IS 300)
- Toyota Altezza RS200
- Land Cruiser
- RX330/Harrier
- Prius
- H125 Alphard
- Isis
- W123 (MR-S)
- Angel T01
- T020 (MR-2)
- T111 (Corolla AE111 Trueno)
- T101
- T091
- T082
- P050 Vitz
- EP82 Starlet GT Turbo
- Lexus LC (URZ100/GWZ100)
- Century
- GR Supra
- Supra Tourer (J29/DB)
- Lexus LC500 Convertible
- Lexus GS-F prod.Kazuki Nakajima
- Lexus IS300
- GR Yaris
- GR86 Wide Body

Also the aero work done to the number 36 Castrol TOM'S SUPRA (1997 GTC 500 Champion with Michael Krumm and Pedro de la Rosa).

== Motorsport ==
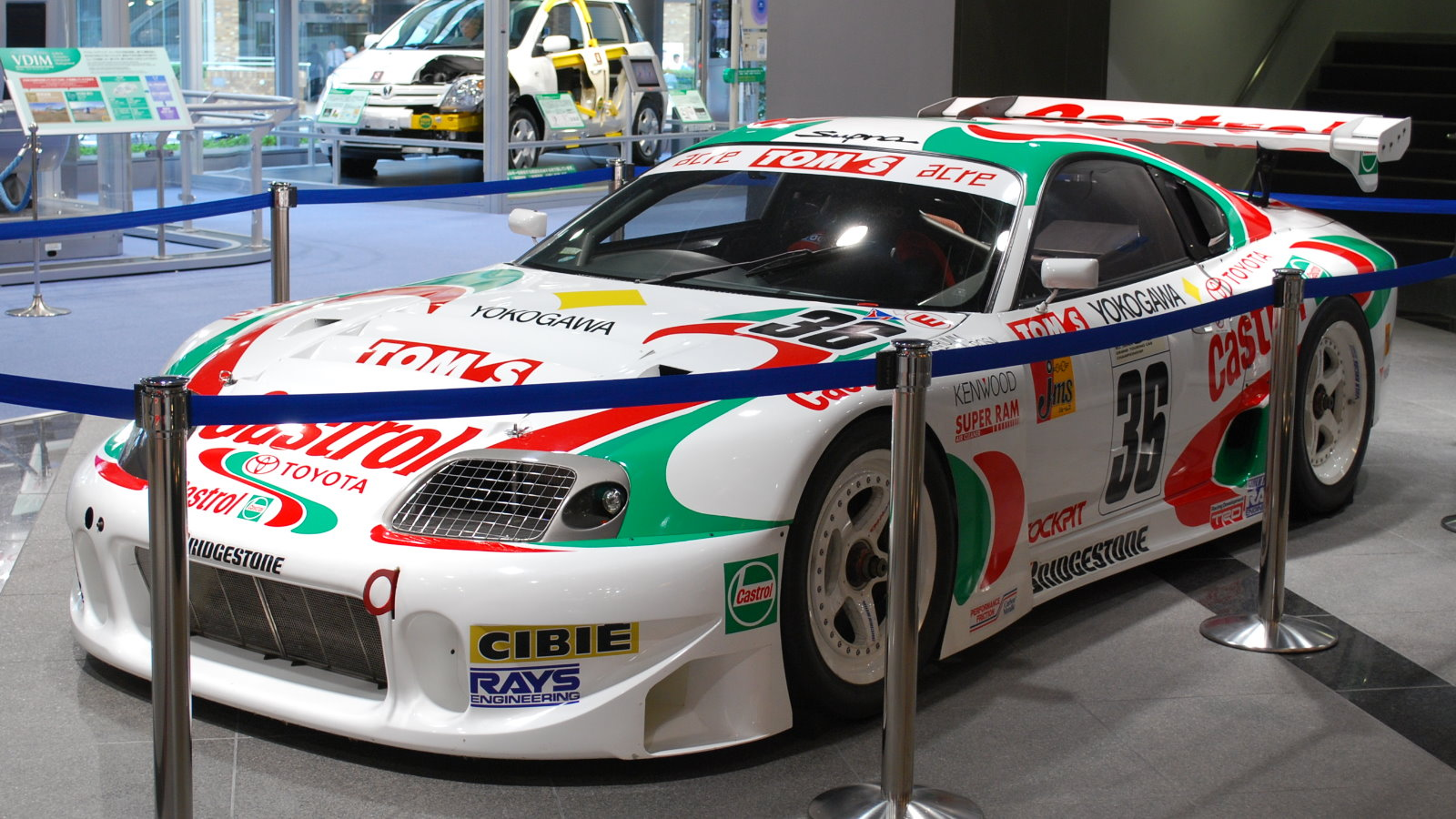
TOM'S JGTC Supra

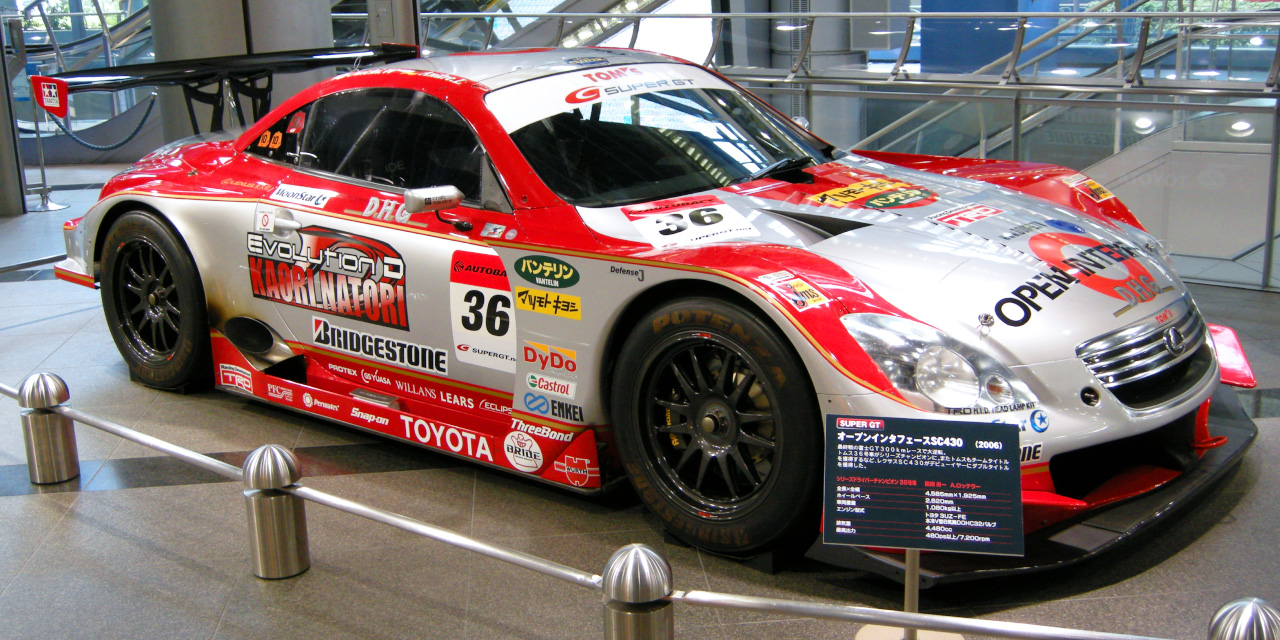
TOM'S SC 430 GT500

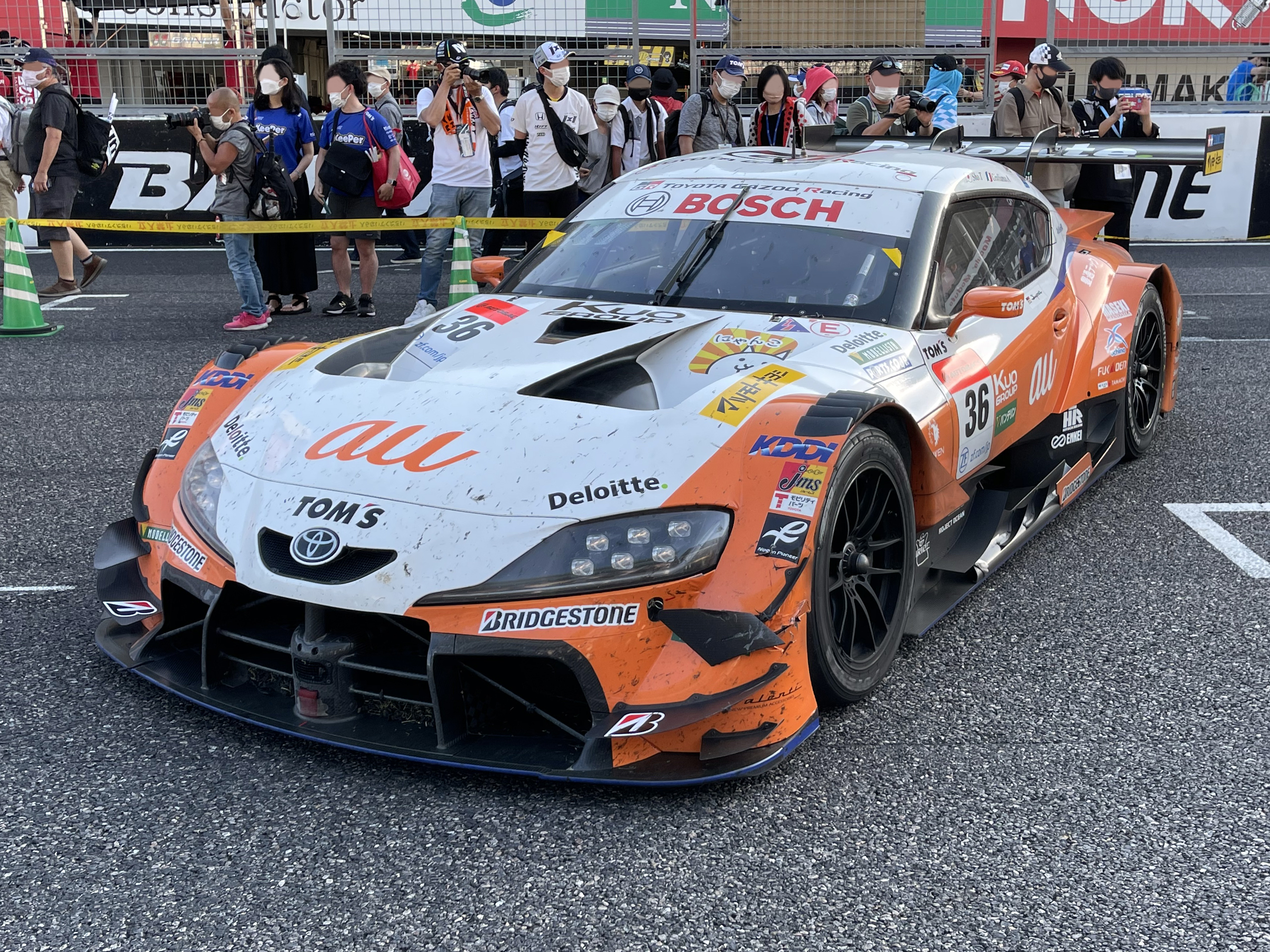
TOM'S GR Supra GT500

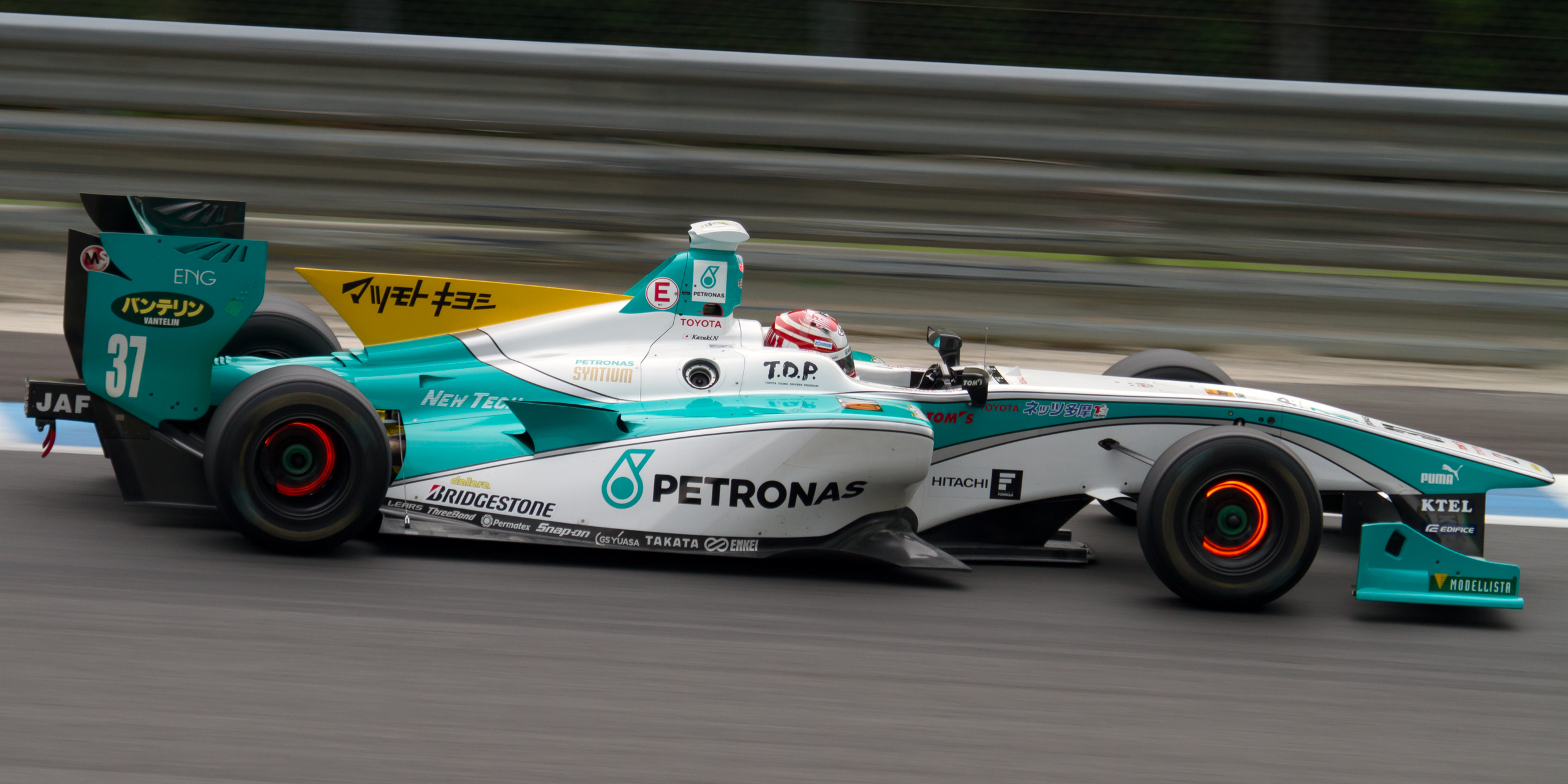
TOM'S Super Formula Dallara SF14 with Toyota RI4A power unit

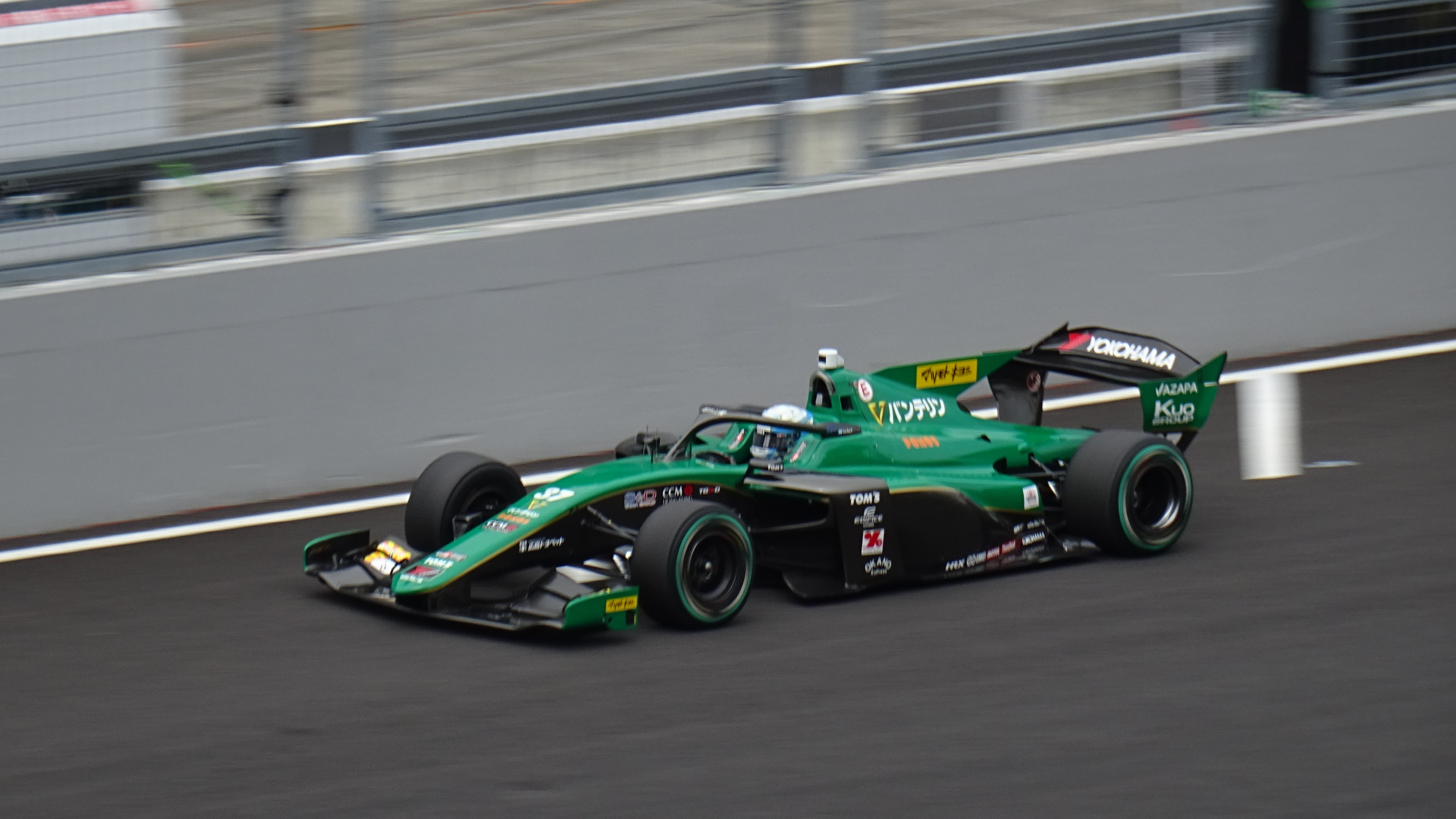
TOM's Super Formula Dallara SF23 in 2026

In addition to aftermarket tuning and parts, TOM'S Racing has a long history in motorsport. Since its founding in 1974, TOM'S has continuously stayed involved in automotive racing, as a tuning partner, engine supplier, or racing team, especially with Toyota factory-backed racing teams.

=== Super Formula Lights (aka Japanese F3) Championship ===
TOM'S Racing had a large involvement and repeated success in the Super Formula Lights (originally Japanese Formula 3 Championship; name changed after FIA nomenclature regulations and the promoters changed to Euroformula Open Championship standards).

They won the championship a record 25 times: in 1987, 1991, 1993, 1994, 1995, 1997, 1998, 1999, 2001, 2003, 2005, 2006, 2007, 2008, 2009, 2010, 2013, 2014, 2015, 2016, 2018, and after the FIA-mandated rebranding, in 2020, 2021, 2022 and 2024.

=== Super GT/JGTC ===
TOM'S Racing has been consistently involved in the Super GT racing series, the top level of Japanese sports car racing, since 1995 when it was called the All Japan Grand Touring Car Championship (JGTC). The team has raced both Toyota and Lexus silhouette cars.

TOM'S has won the GT500 Class Championship eleven times: in 1997, 1999, 2006, 2008, 2009, 2017, 2019, 2021, 2023, 2024 and 2025.

=== 24 Hours of LeMans ===
From 1985 until 1993, TOM'S competed in the 24 Hours of LeMans, with a best result of 2nd place in 1992 with a Toyota TS010.

=== All Japan Sports Prototype Championship ===
TOM'S raced in the All Japan Sports Prototype Championship in Group C, winning a championship in 1992.

=== Macau Grand Prix ===
With the second-most team wins in history, TOM'S has won the Macau Grand Prix five times: in 1992, 1998, 1999, 2007, and 2008.

=== Japanese Touring Car Championship ===
TOM'S won the Japanese Touring Car Championship in 1994 with a Toyota Corona E, and in 1997 with a Toyota Chaser.

=== Super Formula Championship ===
In the top level of Japanese single-seater racing, the Super Formula Championship, TOM'S has won the championship six times: in 2011, 2012, 2014, 2019, 2023, and 2024.

== Results ==
=== 24 Hours of Le Mans ===
Year	Entrant	No.	Tyres	Car	Drivers	Class	Laps	Pos.	Class Pos.
1985	(Japan) TOM'S	36	B	TOM'S 85C	(Japan) Satoru Nakajima (Japan) Masanori Sekiya (Japan) Kaoru Hoshino	C1	330	12th	12th
1986	(Japan) TOM'S Team	36	B	TOM'S 86C	(Japan) Satoru Nakajima (Japan) Masanori Sekiya (United Kingdom) Geoff Lees	C1	105	DNF	DNF
1987	(Japan) Toyota Team TOM'S	36	B	Toyota 87C-L	(United Kingdom) Geoff Lees (Australia) Alan Jones (Sweden) Eje Elgh	C1	19	DNF	DNF
1987	(Japan) Toyota Team TOM'S	37	B	Toyota 87C-L	(Japan) Masanori Sekiya (Japan) Kaoru Hoshino (United Kingdom) Tiff Needell	C1	39	DNF	DNF
1988	(Japan) Toyota Team TOM'S	36	B	Toyota 88C	(Japan) Masanori Sekiya (Japan) Kaoru Hoshino (United Kingdom) Geoff Lees	C1	351	12th	12th
1988	(Japan) Toyota Team TOM'S	37	B	Toyota 88C	(Japan) Hitoshi Ogawa (Italy) Paolo Barilla (United Kingdom) Tiff Needell	C1	283	24th	15th
1989	(Japan) Toyota Team TOM'S	36	B	Toyota 89C-V	(Japan) Hitoshi Ogawa (Italy) Paolo Barilla (United States) Ross Cheever	C1	45	DNF	DNF
1989	(Japan) Toyota Team TOM'S	37	B	Toyota 89C-V	(United Kingdom) Geoff Lees (United Kingdom) Johnny Dumfries (United Kingdom) John Watson	C1	58	DNF	DNF
1989	(Japan) Toyota Team TOM'S	38	B	Toyota 88C	(Japan) Kaoru Hoshino (France) Didier Artzet (Japan) Keiichi Suzuki	C1	20	DNF	DNF
1990	(Japan) Toyota Team TOM'S	36	B	Toyota 90C-V	(Japan) Masanori Sekiya (Japan) Hitoshi Ogawa (United Kingdom) Geoff Lees	C1	347	6th	6th
1990	(Japan) Toyota Team TOM'S	37	B	Toyota 90C-V	(Japan) Aguri Suzuki (United Kingdom) Johnny Dumfries (Italy) Roberto Ravaglia	C1	64	DNF	DNF
1992	(Japan) Toyota Team TOM'S GB	7	G	Toyota TS010	(United Kingdom) Geoff Lees (Australia) David Brabham (Japan) Ukyo Katayama	C1	192	DNF	DNF
1992	(Japan) Toyota Team TOM'S GB	8	G	Toyota TS010	(Netherlands) Jan Lammers (United Kingdom) Andy Wallace (Italy) Teo Fabi	C1	331	8th	5th
1992	(Japan) Toyota Team TOM'S GB	33	G	Toyota TS010	(Japan) Masanori Sekiya (France) Pierre-Henri Raphanel (United Kingdom) Kenny Acheson	C1	346	2nd	2nd
1993	Toyota Team TOM'S Japan	36	M	Toyota TS010	(Japan) Masanori Sekiya (Japan) Toshio Suzuki (United Kingdom) Eddie Irvine	C1	364	4th	4th
1993	Toyota Team TOM'S Japan	37	M	Toyota TS010	(United Kingdom) Kenny Acheson (United Kingdom) Andy Wallace (France) Pierre-Henri Raphanel	C1	212	DNF	DNF
1993	(Japan) Toyota Team TOM'S GB	38	M	Toyota TS010	(United Kingdom) Geoff Lees (Netherlands) Jan Lammers (Argentina) Juan Manuel Fangio II	C1	353	8th	5th

=== Japanese Grand Touring Championship (JGTC) ===
(key) (Races in bold indicate pole position) (Races in italics indicate fastest lap)

Year	Car	Tyres	Class	No.	Drivers	1	2	3	4	5	6	7	8	9	Pos	Pts
1995	Toyota Supra	B	GT1	36	(Japan) Masanori Sekiya (Germany) Michael Krumm	SUZ; 6	FUJ; 6	SEN; 1	FUJ; Ret	SUG; 7	MIN; 4				5th	46
1996	Toyota Supra	B	GT500	36	(Japan) Masanori Sekiya (Spain) Pedro de la Rosa (Japan) Ukyo Katayama	SUZ; 5	FUJ; 2	SEN; 3	FUJ; Ret	SUG; 8	MIN; Ret	NC1; 4			2nd*	68*
1997	Toyota Supra	B	GT500	36	(Germany) Michael Krumm (Spain) Pedro de la Rosa (Japan) Masanori Sekiya (Japan) Ukyo Katayama	SUZ; 13	**FUJ**; 3	SEN; 1	**FUJ**; 2	MIN; 1	SUG; 15	NC1; Ret	NC2; 5		1st*	79*
1997	Toyota Supra	B	GT500	37	(Japan) Toshio Suzuki (Japan) Masanori Sekiya (Japan) Shingo Tachi	**SUZ**; 3	FUJ; 6	**SEN**; 3	FUJ; 3	MIN; 3	SUG; 4	NC1; 3	NC2; 2		1st*	79*
1998	Toyota Supra	D	GT500	36	(Japan) Masanori Sekiya (Argentina) Norberto Fontana	SUZ; 6	FUJ; C	SEN; 3	FUJ; 8	MOT; 3	MIN; 16	SUG; Ret	NC1; Ret		3rd	49
1998	Toyota Supra	D	GT500	37	(Japan) Toshio Suzuki (United Kingdom) Kelvin Burt	SUZ; 7	FUJ; C	SEN; 6	FUJ; 11	MOT; Ret	MIN; 10	SUG; 2	NC1; 6		3rd	49
1999	Toyota Celica	Y	GT300	20	(Japan) Masahiro Matsunaga (Japan) Yasuhisa Fujiwara (Japan) Kumi Sato	SUZ	FUJ; 11	SUG	MIN; 6	FUJ; Ret	OKA; DNS	MOT; 14	NC1		15th	6
1999	Toyota Supra	M	GT500	35	(Japan) Shinichi Yamaji (France) Pierre-Henri Raphanel	SUZ; 13	FUJ; Ret	SUG; 2	MIN; 14	FUJ; 13	OKA; 6	MOT; 6	NC1		9th	27
1999	Toyota Supra	M	GT500	36	(Japan) Masanori Sekiya (Japan) Takuya Kurosawa	SUZ; 4	FUJ; 9	SUG; 1	MIN; 10	**FUJ**; 4	OKA; 4	**MOT**; 1	NC1; 6		1st	97
1999	Toyota Supra	M	GT500	37	(Japan) Toshio Suzuki (Japan) Ukyo Katayama (United Kingdom) Darren Manning	SUZ; 3	FUJ; 4	SUG; 11	**MIN**; 2	FUJ; 15	OKA; 15	MOT; 10	NC1; Ret		1st	97
2000	Toyota MR-S	Y	GT300	20	(Japan) Masahiro Matsunaga (Japan) Kumi Sato	MOT	FUJ	SUG	NC1	FUJ; Ret	OKA; 6	MIN; 9	SUZ; 7		11th	12
2000	Toyota Supra	M	GT500	35	(Japan) Shinichi Yamaji (France) Pierre-Henri Raphanel	MOT; 12	FUJ; Ret	SUG; 3	NC1	FUJ; 13	OKA; 9	MIN; Ret	SUZ; 7		9th	18
2000	Toyota Supra	M	GT500	36	(Japan) Masanori Sekiya (Japan) Takeshi Tsuchiya	MOT; Ret	FUJ; 12	SUG; 9	NC1; 4	FUJ; 5	OKA; 14	MIN; Ret	SUZ; 9		10th	17
2000	Toyota Supra	M	GT500	37	(Japan) Seiji Ara (Japan) Toshio Suzuki (Japan) Shinichi Yamaji	MOT; 9	FUJ; Ret	SUG; 8	NC1; 11	FUJ; 14	OKA; 12	MIN; 9	SUZ; 12		10th	17
2001	Toyota MR-S	Y	GT300	0	(Japan) Masahiro Matsunaga (Japan) Kumi Sato	OKA; 10	FUJ; 11	SUG; Ret	NC1	FUJ; Ret	MOT; 11	SUZ; 7	MIN; Ret		14th	5
2001	Toyota Supra	M	GT500	36	(Japan) Takeshi Tsuchiya (Japan) Takuya Kurosawa (Italy) Paolo Montin (Australia) Wayne Gardner	OKA; 11	FUJ; 10	SUG; 8	NC1; Ret	FUJ; 8	MOT; 5	SUZ; 5	MIN; 7		5th	55
2001	Toyota Supra	M	GT500	37	(Australia) Wayne Gardner (Japan) Shinichi Yamaji	OKA; 5	FUJ; 9	SUG; 1	NC1	FUJ; 10	MOT; 8	SUZ; 4	MIN; 9		5th	55
2002	Toyota MR-S	Y	GT300	17	(Japan) Masahiro Matsunaga (Japan) Ken Namekawa	OKA; 12	FUJ; 11	SUG; 14	SEP	FUJ; 23	MOT	MIN; Ret	SUZ; 11		-	0
2002	Toyota Supra	M	GT500	36	(Japan) Takeshi Tsuchiya (Australia) Wayne Gardner	OKA; 8	FUJ; 14	SUG; 10	SEP; 2	FUJ; 5	MOT; 6	MIN; 3	SUZ; 9		5th	65
2002	Toyota Supra	M	GT500	37	(Japan) Takuya Kurosawa (Italy) Paolo Montin (Japan) Hideki Noda	OKA; Ret	FUJ; 12	SUG; 5	SEP; 3	FUJ; 3	MOT; 7	MIN; Ret	SUZ; 16		5th	65
2003	Toyota MR-S (Rd. 1-6); Toyota Celica (Rd. 8)	Y	GT300	17	(Japan) Masahiro Matsunaga (Japan) Masaoki Nagashima	OKA; 18	FUJ; 18	SUG; 12	FUJ; 9	FUJ; Ret	MOT; 9	AUT	SUZ; 20		17th	4
2003	Toyota Supra	M	GT500	36	(France) Érik Comas (Japan) Takeshi Tsuchiya	OKA; 6	FUJ; 10	SUG; 2	FUJ; 7	FUJ; 5	**MOT**; 2	AUT; 8	SUZ; 8		4th	66
2003	Toyota Supra	M	GT500	37	(Italy) Marco Apicella (Japan) Takuya Kurosawa	OKA; Ret	FUJ; 8	SUG; 13	FUJ; 15	FUJ; 6	MOT; 10	AUT; 13	SUZ; 14		4th	66
2004	Toyota Celica	Y	GT300	17	(Japan) Masahiro Matsunaga (Japan) Masaoki Nagashima	OKA; Ret	SUG; 2	SEP; 12	TOK; 12	MOT; 16	AUT; 11	SUZ; 15	NC1	NC2	11th	15
2004	Toyota Supra	B	GT500	36	(Italy) Marco Apicella (Japan) Takeshi Tsuchiya	OKA; 7	SUG; 7	SEP; 10	TOK; 4	MOT; 5	AUT; 7	**SUZ**; 2	NC1	NC2	3rd	60
2004	Toyota Supra	B	GT500	37	(Australia) James Courtney (Japan) Tatsuya Kataoka	OKA; 11	SUG; 3	SEP; 5	TOK; 5	MOT; 4	AUT; 6	SUZ; 6	NC1; 5	NC2; 2	3rd	60

Note: in 1996 and 1997 Cerumo and TOM's entered the Team's Championship together under the Toyota Castrol Team banner.

=== Complete Super GT Results ===
(key) (Races in bold indicate pole position) (Races in italics indicate fastest lap)

Year	Car	Tyres	Class	No.	Drivers	1	2	3	4	5	6	7	8	9	10	Pos.	Points
2005	Toyota Supra	B	GT500	36	(Australia) James Courtney (Japan) Takeshi Tsuchiya	OKA; 2	FUJ; 10	SEP; 3	SUG; 3	MOT; 7	FUJ; 5	AUT; 8	SUZ; 5			3rd	73
2005	Toyota Supra	B	GT500	37	(Japan) Tatsuya Kataoka (Japan) Sakon Yamamoto	OKA; 6	FUJ; 6	SEP; 13	SUG; 1	MOT; 8	FUJ; 7	AUT; Ret	SUZ; 7			3rd	73
2006	Lexus SC430	B	GT500	36	(Germany) André Lotterer (Japan) Juichi Wakisaka (Germany) Adrian Sutil	SUZ; 1	OKA; 8	FUJ; 3	SEP; 15	SUG; 4	SUZ; 10	MOT; 2	AUT; 7	FUJ; 4		1st	75
2007	Lexus SC430	B	GT500	1	(Germany) André Lotterer (Japan) Juichi Wakisaka (United Kingdom) Oliver Jarvis	SUZ; 7	OKA; 5	FUJ; Ret	SEP; 8	SUG; 5	SUZ; 1	MOT; 6	AUT; 6	FUJ; 6		5th	78
2008	Lexus SC430	B	GT500	36	(Germany) André Lotterer (Japan) Juichi Wakisaka (Netherlands) Carlo van Dam	SUZ; 3	OKA; 4	FUJ; 2	SEP; 7	SUG; 10	SUZ; 3	MOT; 3	AUT; 8	FUJ; 7		1st	94
2009	Lexus SC430	B	GT500	36	(Germany) André Lotterer (Japan) Juichi Wakisaka	OKA; 11	SUZ; 2	FUJ; 2	SEP; 6	SUG; 7	SUZ; 8	FUJ; 3	AUT; 1	MOT; 2		1st	112
2010	Lexus SC430	B	GT500	1	(Germany) André Lotterer (Japan) Juichi Wakisaka	SUZ; 4	OKA; 3	FUJ; 2	SEP; 8	SUG; 7	SUZ; 10	FUJ; C	MOT; 1	NC1; 13	NC2; 7	2nd	82
2011	Lexus SC430	B	GT500	36	(Germany) André Lotterer (Japan) Kazuki Nakajima	OKA; 4	FUJ; 4	SEP; 6	SUG; 9	SUZ; 6	FUJ; 15	AUT; 4	MOT; 8	NC1; 4	NC2; 7	8th	60
2012	Lexus SC430	B	GT500	36	(Japan) Kazuki Nakajima (France) Loïc Duval (United Kingdom) Richard Lyons	OKA; 5	FUJ; 4	SEP; 13	SUG; 2	SUZ; Ret	FUJ; 4	AUT; 15	MOT; 8	NC1; 15	**NC2**; 2	8th	57
2013	Lexus SC430	B	GT500	36	(Japan) Kazuki Nakajima (United Kingdom) James Rossiter	OKA; 12	**FUJ**; 1	SEP; 11	SUG; 10	SUZ; 3	FUJ; 12	AUT; 1	MOT; 5	NC1; 5	NC2; 2	3rd	80
2013	Lexus SC430	B	GT500	37	(Japan) Daisuke Ito (Italy) Andrea Caldarelli	OKA; 15	FUJ; 6	SEP; 10	SUG; 2	SUZ; 5	FUJ; 3	AUT; 9	MOT; 6	NC1; Ret	NC2; 11	8th	69
2014	Lexus RC F	B	GT500	36	(United Kingdom) James Rossiter (Japan) Kazuki Nakajima (Japan) Ryo Hirakawa	OKA; 13	FUJ; 9	AUT; 5	**SUG**; 4	FUJ; 5	SUZ; 1	BUR; 1	MOT; 8			3rd	88
2014	Lexus RC F	B	GT500	37	(Japan) Daisuke Ito (Italy) Andrea Caldarelli	OKA; 1	FUJ; 5	AUT; 4	SUG; 2	FUJ; 9	SUZ; 7	BUR; 4	MOT; 2			2nd	101
2015	Lexus RC F	B	GT500	36	(Japan) Daisuke Ito (United Kingdom) James Rossiter	OKA; 14	FUJ; 3	CHA; 7	FUJ; 7	SUZ; 1	SUG; 13	AUT; 5	MOT; Ret			7th	66
2015	Lexus RC F	B	GT500	37	(Italy) Andrea Caldarelli (Japan) Ryo Hirakawa	**OKA**; 1	FUJ; 6	CHA; 6	FUJ; 12	SUZ; 8	SUG; 9	AUT; 12	**MOT**; 1			4th	75
2016	Lexus RC F	B	GT500	36	(New Zealand) Nick Cassidy (Japan) Daisuke Ito	OKA; 8	FUJ; 4	SUG; 11	FUJ; 5	SUZ; 2	CHA; 11	MOT; 3	MOT; 4			5th	78
2016	Lexus RC F	B	GT500	37	(Japan) Ryō Hirakawa (United Kingdom) James Rossiter	**OKA**; 2	FUJ; 3	SUG; 8	FUJ; 12	SUZ; Ret	CHA; 9	MOT; Ret	MOT; 5			10th	53
2017	Lexus LC500	B	GT500	36	(United Kingdom) James Rossiter (Japan) Kazuki Nakajima (Japan) Daisuke Ito	OKA; 5	FUJ; 5	AUT; 1	SUG; 7	FUJ; 4	SUZ; 9	CHA; 5	MOT; 14			5th	73
2017	Lexus LC500	B	GT500	37	(Japan) Ryō Hirakawa (New Zealand) Nick Cassidy	OKA; 1	FUJ; 3	AUT; 6	SUG; 10	FUJ; 6	SUZ; 6	**CHA**; 1	MOT; 2			1st	105
2018	Lexus LC500	B	GT500	1	(Japan) Ryō Hirakawa (New Zealand) Nick Cassidy	OKA; 3	FUJ; 7	SUZ; 3	CHA; 8	FUJ; 2	SUG; 14	AUT; 1	MOT; 4			2nd	97
2018	Lexus LC500	B	GT500	36	(Japan) Yuhi Sekiguchi (Japan) Kazuki Nakajima (United Kingdom) James Rossiter	OKA; 13	FUJ; 4	SUZ; 5	CHA; 10	FUJ; 1	SUG; 12	AUT; 2	MOT; 13			5th	78
2019	Lexus LC500	B	GT500	36	(Japan) Yuhi Sekiguchi (Japan) Kazuki Nakajima (Japan) Ritomo Miyata	OKA; 9	FUJ; Ret	**SUZ**; 1	BUR; 9	FUJ; Ret	AUT; 10	SUG; 10	**MOT**; 3	NC1; 7	NC2; 19	8th	53
2019	Lexus LC500	B	GT500	37	(Japan) Ryō Hirakawa (New Zealand) Nick Cassidy	OKA; 12	FUJ; 7	SUZ; 2	BUR; 2	FUJ; 4	AUT; 3	SUG; 4	MOT; 1	**NC1**; 1	NC2; 8	1st	107
2020	Toyota GR Supra	B	GT500	36	(Japan) Yuhi Sekiguchi (France) Sacha Fenestraz	FUJ; 2	FUJ; 2	SUZ; 3	MOT; 11	FUJ; 12	SUZ; 7	MOT; 13	FUJ; 3			4th	77
2020	Toyota GR Supra	B	GT500	37	(Japan) Ryō Hirakawa (New Zealand) Nick Cassidy (Japan) Kenta Yamashita	**FUJ**; 1	FUJ; 4	SUZ; 7	MOT; 6	FUJ; 4	SUZ; Ret	MOT; 6	**FUJ**; 2			2nd	86
2021	Toyota GR Supra	B	GT500	36	(Japan) Yuhi Sekiguchi (Japan) Sho Tsuboi	OKA; 2	FUJ; 13	MOT; 3	SUZ; 5	SUG; 4	AUT; 10	MOT; 8	FUJ; 1			1st	58
2021	Toyota GR Supra	B	GT500	37	(Japan) Ryō Hirakawa (Japan) Sena Sakaguchi (France) Sacha Fenestraz	**OKA**; 3	FUJ; 3	MOT; 7	SUZ; 10	SUG; 11	AUT; 9	MOT; 10	FUJ; 2			7th	67
2022	Toyota GR Supra	B	GT500	36	(France) Giuliano Alesi (Japan) Sho Tsuboi	OKA; 6	FUJ; 2	SUZ; 10	FUJ; 4	SUZ; 9	SUG; 10	AUT; 8	MOT; 9			9th	51
2022	Toyota GR Supra	B	GT500	37	(France) Sacha Fenestraz (Japan) Ritomo Miyata	OKA; 11	FUJ; 14	SUZ; 3	FUJ; 1	SUZ; 8	SUG; 9	AUT; 9	MOT; 6			6th	64.5
2023	Toyota GR Supra	B	GT500	36	(Japan) Sho Tsuboi (Japan) Ritomo Miyata	OKA; 15	FUJ; 1	**SUZ**; 2	FUJ; 4	SUZ; 10	SUG; 7	AUT; 1	MOT; 1			1st	109
2023	Toyota GR Supra	B	GT500	37	(France) Giuliano Alesi (Japan) Ukyo Sasahara	OKA; 13	FUJ; 6	SUZ; 11	FUJ; 8	SUZ; 11	SUG; 10	AUT; 7	MOT; 9			14th	36
2024	Toyota GR Supra	B	GT500	36	(Japan) Sho Tsuboi (Japan) Kenta Yamashita	**OKA**; 1	FUJ; 4	SUZ; 5	FUJ; 7	SUG; 4	AUT; 7	MOT; 1	**SUZ**; 1			1st	114
2024	Toyota GR Supra	B	GT500	37	(France) Giuliano Alesi (Japan) Ukyo Sasahara	OKA; 7	FUJ; 11	**SUZ**; 1	FUJ; 10	SUG; 1	AUT; 8	MOT; Ret	SUZ; 11			6th	68
2025	Toyota GR Supra	B	GT500	1	(Japan) Sho Tsuboi (Japan) Kenta Yamashita	OKA; 1	FUJ; 2	SEP; 7	FS1; 1	FS2; 2	SUZ; 9	SUG; 9	AUT; 13†	MOT; 1		1st	102.5
2025	Toyota GR Supra	B	GT500	37	(France) Giuliano Alesi (Japan) Ukyo Sasahara	OKA; 5	FUJ; 7	SEP; 1	FS1; 3	FS2; 7	SUZ; 12	SUG; 5	AUT; Ret	MOT; 5		7th	70.5

Note: Non-championship (NC1, NC2) races are major races that do not count towards the championship.

=== Complete Formula Nippon/Super Formula results ===
(key) (Races in bold indicate pole position) (Races in italics indicate fastest lap)

Year	Chassis	Engine	No.	Drivers	1	2	3	4	5	6	7	8	9	10	11	D.C.	Pts	T.C.	Pts
Formula Nippon
2006	Lola FN06	Toyota	36	(Germany) André Lotterer	FUJ; 8	SUZ; 5	MOT; 1	SUZ; 5	AUT; 8	FUJ; 2	SUG; Ret	MOT; Ret	SUZ; 1			3rd	30	2nd	32
2006	Lola FN06	Toyota	37	(Japan) Takeshi Tsuchiya	FUJ; 9	SUZ; 10	MOT; Ret	SUZ; 7	AUT; 9	FUJ; Ret	SUG; 8	MOT; 8	SUZ; 5			13th	2	2nd	32
2007	Lola FN06	Toyota	36	(Germany) André Lotterer	FUJ; Ret	SUZ; 5	MOT; 2	OKA; Ret	SUZ; 13	FUJ; 1	SUG; 7	MOT; 4	SUZ; 2			5th	37	4th	48
2007	Lola FN06	Toyota	37	(Japan) Seiji Ara	FUJ; 11	SUZ; Ret	MOT; 15	OKA; 7	SUZ; 10	FUJ; 4	SUG; Ret	MOT; 13	SUZ; 5			11th	11	4th	48
2008	Lola FN06	Toyota	36	(Germany) André Lotterer	FUJ; Ret	SUZ; 3	MOT; 2	OKA; 2	SUZ; 2	SUZ; 4	MOT; 11	MOT; 7	FUJ; 5	FUJ; 4	SUG; 12	3rd	49	3rd	58
2008	Lola FN06	Toyota	37	(Japan) Seiji Ara	FUJ; Ret	SUZ; 11	MOT; 10	OKA; 10	SUZ1; 13	SUZ2; 11	MOT1; 7	MOT2; 1	FUJ1; 10	FUJ2; 10	SUG; 16	14th	9	3rd	58
2009	Swift 017.n	Toyota	36	(Germany) André Lotterer	FUJ; 10	SUZ; 3	MOT; 5	FUJ; 8	SUZ; 7	MOT; 1	AUT; 2	SUG; 2				3rd	39	2nd	52
2009	Swift 017.n	Toyota	37	(Japan) Kazuya Oshima	FUJ; 7	SUZ; 10	MOT; Ret	FUJ; 2	SUZ; 10	MOT; 11	AUT; 9	SUG; 6				9th	13	2nd	52
2010	Swift 017.n	Toyota	36	(Germany) André Lotterer	SUZ; 3	MOT; 3	FUJ; 2	MOT; Ret	SUG; 3	AUT; 1	SUZ; 3	SUZ; 2				2nd	43	2nd	67
2010	Swift 017.n	Toyota	37	(Japan) Kazuya Oshima	SUZ; 12	MOT; 8	FUJ; 4	MOT; 5	SUG; 1	**AUT**; DNS	SUZ; 5	SUZ; 7				6th	24	2nd	67
2011	Swift 017.n	Toyota	36	(Germany) André Lotterer	SUZ; 1		FUJ; 1	MOT; 2	SUZ; C	SUG; 1	**MOT**; 1	**MOT**; 1				1st	56	1st	96
2011	Swift 017.n	Toyota	36	(Japan) Takuto Iguchi		AUT; 11										18th	0	1st	96
2011	Swift 017.n	Toyota	37	(Japan) Kazuki Nakajima	SUZ; 3	AUT; 1	FUJ; 3	MOT; 3	SUZ; C	SUG; 3	MOT; 2	MOT; 2				2nd	42	1st	96
2012	Swift 017.n	Toyota	1	(Germany) André Lotterer	SUZ; 5	**MOT**; 1	AUT; Ret	FUJ; 1	MOT; 2	SUG; 10	SUZ; 5	SUZ; 8				4th	35.5	2nd	76.5
2012	Swift 017.n	Toyota	2	(Japan) Kazuki Nakajima	SUZ; 1	MOT; 3	AUT; 5	**FUJ**; 2	MOT; 4	SUG; 5	SUZ; 12	SUZ; 1				1st	46	2nd	76.5
Super Formula
2013	Swift SF13	Toyota	1	(Japan) Kazuki Nakajima	SUZ; 5	AUT; 12	FUJ; 8	**MOT**; 1	SUG; Ret	SUZ; Ret	SUZ; 1					4th	24	1st	58.5
2013	Swift SF13	Toyota	2	(United Kingdom) James Rossiter	SUZ; 11					SUZ; 7	SUZ; 6					16th	2.5	1st	58.5
2013	Swift SF13	Toyota	2	(Germany) André Lotterer		**AUT**; 1	FUJ; 1	MOT; 2	SUG; 2							2nd	37	1st	58.5
2014	Dallara SF14	Toyota	36	(Germany) André Lotterer	**SUZ**; 6	FUJ; 4	**FUJ**; 1	FUJ; 6		AUT; 1	SUG; Ret	**SUZ**; 3	SUZ; 2			3rd	34.5	1st	79.5
2014	Dallara SF14	Toyota	36	(Italy) Andrea Caldarelli					MOT; 3							12th	7	1st	79.5
2014	Dallara SF14	Toyota	37	(Japan) Kazuki Nakajima	SUZ; 5	FUJ; 2	FUJ; 3	FUJ; 1	MOT; 7	AUT; 6	SUG; 2	SUZ; 2	**SUZ**; 1			1st	46	1st	79.5
2015	Dallara SF14	Toyota	1	(Japan) Kazuki Nakajima	SUZ; 2		FUJ; 2	MOT; 2	AUT; 1	SUG; 4	SUZ; 4	SUZ; 2				2nd	45.5	1st	80.5
2015	Dallara SF14	Toyota	1	(Japan) Kazuya Oshima		OKA; 15										20th	0	1st	80.5
2015	Dallara SF14	Toyota	2	(Germany) André Lotterer	SUZ; 1	OKA; 8	FUJ; 5	MOT; 4	AUT; 11	**SUG**; 1	**SUZ**; 1	SUZ; Ret				3rd	40	1st	80.5
2016	Dallara SF14	Toyota	36	(Germany) André Lotterer	SUZ; 7	OKA; 8	FUJ; 4	MOT; 2	OKA; 12	OKA; 4	SUG; 5	SUZ; 2	SUZ; 2			2nd	30	2nd	51
2016	Dallara SF14	Toyota	37	(Japan) Kazuki Nakajima	SUZ; 12	OKA; 17	FUJ; 2	MOT; 7	**OKA**; 19	OKA; 2	SUG; 4	SUZ; 5	SUZ; 16			6th	22	2nd	51
2017	Dallara SF14	Toyota	36	(Germany) André Lotterer	SUZ; 5	OKA; 1	OKA; 3	FUJ; 3	MOT; 7	AUT; Ret	SUG; 10	**SUZ**; C	SUZ; C			6th	21	3rd	41
2017	Dallara SF14	Toyota	37	(Japan) Kazuki Nakajima	**SUZ**; 1	OKA; 9	OKA; 18	FUJ; 7	MOT; 11	AUT; 6	SUG; 3	SUZ; C	SUZ; C			5th	22	3rd	41
2018	Dallara SF14	Toyota	36	(Japan) Kazuki Nakajima	SUZ; 8	AUT; C	SUG; 3	FUJ; 5		OKA; 17	SUZ; 5					6th	15	6th	15
2018	Dallara SF14	Toyota	36	(Brazil) João Paulo de Oliveira					MOT; 18							23rd	0	6th	15
2018	Dallara SF14	Toyota	37	(United Kingdom) James Rossiter	SUZ; 11	AUT; C	SUG; Ret	FUJ; 19	MOT; 9	OKA; 11	SUZ; Ret					17th	0	6th	15
2019	Dallara SF19	Toyota	36	(Japan) Kazuki Nakajima	SUZ; Ret	AUT; 13	SUG; 12	FUJ; 5	MOT; 16	OKA; 2	SUZ; 14					12th	12	2nd	48
2019	Dallara SF19	Toyota	37	(New Zealand) Nick Cassidy	SUZ; 11	AUT; 5	SUG; 5	FUJ; 9	MOT; 5	OKA; Ret	SUZ; 3					1st	36	2nd	48
2020	Dallara SF19	Toyota	1	(New Zealand) Nick Cassidy	MOT; 13	OKA; 6	SUG; 3	AUT; 2	**SUZ**; 1	SUZ; Ret	FUJ; 5					4th	50	1st	77
2020	Dallara SF19	Toyota	36	(Japan) Kazuki Nakajima	MOT; 4		SUG; 15		SUZ; 2	SUZ; 16	FUJ; 9					11th	25	1st	77
2020	Dallara SF19	Toyota	36	(Japan) Ritomo Miyata		OKA; 9		AUT; 8								17th	7	1st	77
2021	Dallara SF19	Toyota	36	(Japan) Kazuki Nakajima	FUJ; 11					MOT; 7						16th	4	6th	37
2021	Dallara SF19	Toyota	36	(France) Giuliano Alesi		SUZ; 9	**AUT**; 1‡	SUG; 9	MOT; 16		SUZ; 8					11th	20	6th	37
2021	Dallara SF19	Toyota	37	(Japan) Ritomo Miyata	FUJ; 7	SUZ; 6	AUT; 4‡	SUG; 7	MOT; 8	MOT; 9	SUZ; 14					10th	22	6th	37
2022	Dallara SF19	Toyota	36	(France) Giuliano Alesi	FUJ; 17	FUJ; 8	SUZ; 15	AUT; Ret	SUG; 13	FUJ; Ret	MOT; 13	MOT; Ret	SUZ; 21	SUZ; 16		20th	3	6th	59
2022	Dallara SF19	Toyota	37	(Japan) Ritomo Miyata	FUJ; 5	FUJ; 3	SUZ; 18	AUT; 5	SUG; 6	FUJ; 4	MOT; 8	MOT; 14	SUZ; 5	SUZ; 3		4th	64	6th	59
2023	Dallara SF23	Toyota	36	(France) Giuliano Alesi	FUJ; Ret	FUJ; Ret	SUZ; 8	AUT; 13	SUG; Ret							20th	3	2nd	109.5
2023	Dallara SF23	Toyota	36	(Japan) Ukyo Sasahara						FUJ; 19	MOT; 12	SUZ; 22	SUZ; WD			22nd	0	2nd	109.5
2023	Dallara SF23	Toyota	37	(Japan) Ritomo Miyata	FUJ; 5	FUJ; 4	SUZ; 1	AUT; 2	SUG; 1	FUJ; 3	MOT; 4	SUZ; 2‡	SUZ; 3			1st	114.5	2nd	109.5
2024	Dallara SF23	Toyota	36	(Japan) Sho Tsuboi	SUZ; 11	AUT; 3	SUG; 3‡	FUJ; 1	MOT; 5	FUJ; 1	FUJ; 1	SUZ; 2	SUZ; 2			1st	117.5	3rd	112.5
2024	Dallara SF23	Toyota	37	(Japan) Ukyo Sasahara	SUZ; 15	AUT; 12	SUG; 16	FUJ; 12	MOT; 16	FUJ; 12	FUJ; 14	SUZ; 15†	SUZ; 14			20th	0	3rd	112.5
