= Steven Andskär =

Swedish race car driver (born 1964)

Carl Steven Andskär (born 30 October 1964, in Stockholm) is a Swedish race car driver. His long career started out in the mid-1970s when he competed in karting. After that—in the early 1980s—he went from karting to driving several races in Formula 3. Later on he advanced to Formula 3000 which he raced in from 1986 until 1988. He continued after that with several sports car races and touring car races. Andskär has also participated in the famous Le Mans race seven times where he managed to finish second in 1994. He also drove in the 24 Hours of Daytona.

Andskär spent many years racing in the All Japan Sports Prototype Championship alongside George Fouché.

== Racing results ==
=== 24 Hours of Le Mans results ===
Year	Team	Co-Drivers	Car	Class	Laps	Pos.	Class Pos.
1989	(United Kingdom) Richard Lloyd Racing	(United Kingdom) Damon Hill (United Kingdom) David Hobbs	Porsche 962C GTi	C1	228	DNF	DNF
1990	(Japan) Trust Racing Team	(South Africa) George Fouché (Japan) Shunji Kasuya	Porsche 962C	C1	330	13th	13th
1991	(France) Courage Compétition (Japan) Trust Racing	(South Africa) George Fouché	Porsche 962C	C2	316	DNF	DNF
1992	(Japan) Trust Racing Team	(South Africa) George Fouché (Sweden) Stefan Johansson	Toyota 92C-V	C2	336	5th	1st
1993	(Japan) Nisso Trust Racing Team	(Sweden) Eje Elgh (South Africa) George Fouché	Toyota 93C-V	C2	358	6th	2nd
1994	(Japan) Nisso Trust Racing Team	(South Africa) George Fouché (France) Bob Wollek	Toyota 94C-V	LMP1/C90	328	4th	2nd
