= Toshio Suzuki (racing driver) =

Japanese racing driver (born 1955)

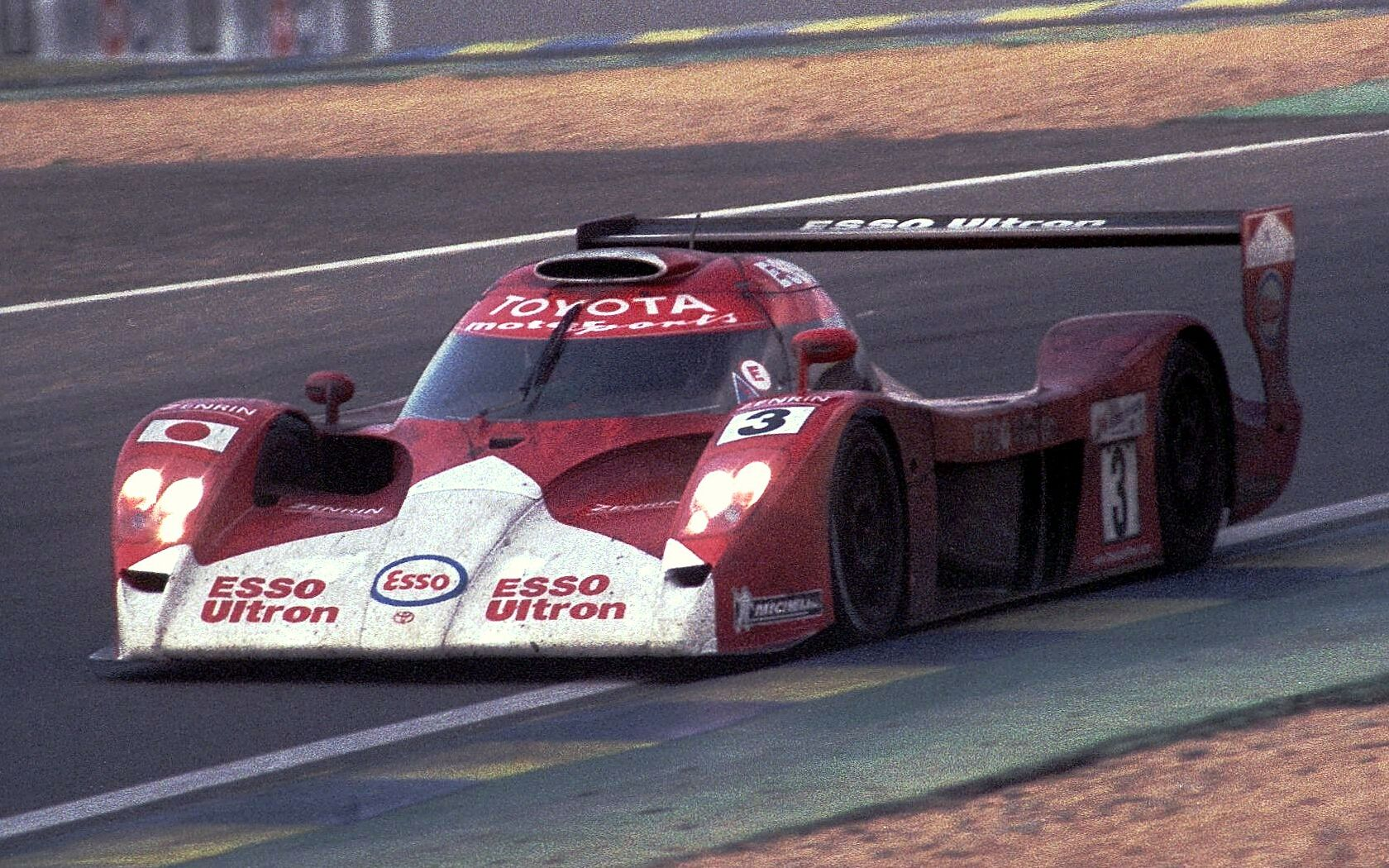
- The Toyota GT-One driven by Suzuki at the 1999 24 Hours of Le Mans.
- Born: 10 March 1955 (age 71)

Formula One World Championship career
- Nationality: (Japan) Japanese
- Active years: 1993
- Team: Larrousse
- Entries: 2
- Championships: 0
- Wins: 0
- Podiums: 0
- Career points: 0
- Pole positions: 0
- Fastest laps: 0
- First entry: 1993 Japanese Grand Prix
- Last entry: 1993 Australian Grand Prix

24 Hours of Le Mans career
- Years: 1985–1986, 1988–1990, 1993, 1995–1996, 1998–2000, 2008
- Teams: Dome, Team LeMans, Tom's, NISMO, TV Asahi Team Dragon, Tōkai University YGK
- Best finish: 2nd (1999)
- Class wins: 1 (1999)

NASCAR O'Reilly Auto Parts Series career
- 1 race run over 1 year
- Best finish: 96th (1996)
- First race: 1996 Meridian Advantage 200 (Nazareth Speedway)
Wins	Top tens	Poles
0	0	0

Toshio Suzuki (鈴木 利男, Suzuki Toshio; born 10 March 1955) is a former racing driver from Saitama Prefecture, Japan.

Suzuki is unrelated to fellow racing driver Aguri Suzuki despite sharing a last name.

== Racing career ==
As a youth, Suzuki won the All-Japan Kart Championships in 1975 and 1976. In 1979, he took the title of the first All-Japan Formula Three Championship.

In 1992, Suzuki won the 24 Hours of Daytona with Kazuyoshi Hoshino and Masahiro Hasemi. In the same year, he was runner-up in the Japanese F3000 championship.

=== Formula One ===
In 1993, Suzuki participated in two Formula One Grands Prix, standing in for Philippe Alliot at the Larrousse team. Though he scored no championship points, he finished both races.

=== After Formula One ===
Suzuki competed mainly in national championships, including the Japanese Formula 3000 Championship (later Formula Nippon), Japanese Touring Car Championship (JTCC) and All-Japan Grand Touring Car Championship (JGTC). He also participated into the 24 Hours of Le Mans. In 1996, he made a single start in the NASCAR Busch Series, driving for Joe Bessey at Nazareth Speedway; an accident during the race left him with a concussion.

In 2006, Suzuki became the director of the R&D SPORT in Super GT to continue the team that Direxiv abandoned.

== GT-R ==
Most recently, he worked for Nissan as a test driver to help in the development of the R35 Nissan GT-R.

== Motorsports career results ==
=== 24 Hours of Le Mans results ===
Year	Team	Co-Drivers	Car	Class	Laps	Pos.	Class Pos.
1985	(Japan) Dome Team	(Sweden) Eje Elgh (United Kingdom) Geoff Lees	Dome 85C-L-Toyota	C1	141	DNF	DNF
1986	(Japan) Dome Co. Ltd.	(Sweden) Eje Elgh (Italy) Beppe Gabbiani	Dome 86C-L-Toyota	C1	296	DNF	DNF
1988	(Japan) Italiya Sport (Japan) Team Le Mans	(France) Michel Trollé (United States) Danny Ongais	March 88S-Nissan	C1	74	DNF	DNF
1989	(Japan) Nissan Motorsports	(Japan) Masahiro Hasemi (Japan) Kazuyoshi Hoshino	Nissan R89C	C1	167	DNF	DNF
1990	(Japan) Nissan Motorsports International	(Japan) Masahiro Hasemi (Japan) Kazuyoshi Hoshino	Nissan R90CP	C1	348	5th	5th
1993	(Japan) Toyota Team Tom's	(United Kingdom) Eddie Irvine (Japan) Masanori Sekiya	Toyota TS010	C1	364	4th	4th
1995	(Japan) NISMO	(Japan) Kazuyoshi Hoshino (Japan) Masahiko Kageyama	Nissan Skyline GT-R LM	GT1	157	DNF	DNF
1996	(Japan) NISMO	(Japan) Kazuyoshi Hoshino (Japan) Masahiro Hasemi	Nissan Skyline GT-R LM	GT1	307	15th	10th
1998	(Japan) Toyota Motorsport (Germany) Toyota Team Europe	(Japan) Ukyo Katayama (Japan) Keiichi Tsuchiya	Toyota GT-One	GT1	326	9th	8th
1999	(Japan) Toyota Motorsport (Germany) Toyota Team Europe	(Japan) Ukyo Katayama (Japan) Keiichi Tsuchiya	Toyota GT-One	LMGTP	364	**2nd**	**1st**
2000	(Japan) TV Asahi Team Dragon	(Japan) Masami Kageyama (Japan) Masahiko Kageyama	Panoz LMP-1 Roadster-S-Élan	LMP900	340	6th	6th
2008	(Japan) Tōkai University (Japan) YGK Power	(Japan) Haruki Kurosawa (Japan) Masami Kageyama	Courage-Oreca LC70-YGK	LMP1	185	DNF	DNF

=== Japanese Formula Two/Formula 3000/Formula Nippon results ===
(key) (Races in bold indicate pole position; races in italics indicate fastest lap)

Year	Entrant	1	2	3	4	5	6	7	8	9	10	11	DC	Points
1980	Heroes Racing Corporation	SUZ	MIN	SUZ	SUZ	SUZ; Ret	SUZ						NC	0
1982	Heroes Racing Corporation	SUZ	FUJ	SUZ	SUZ	SUZ; 9	SUZ; 12						21st	2
1983	Kondou Racing	SUZ	FUJ	MIN	SUZ; Ret	SUZ; 6	FUJ; Ret	SUZ; 9	SUZ; 10				14th	9
1984	Team Le Mans	SUZ; 5	FUJ; 8	MIN; 3	SUZ; 7	SUZ; 9	FUJ; Ret	SUZ; 10	SUZ; Ret				8th	30
1987	Heroes Racing Corporation	SUZ; 3	FUJ; Ret	MIN; 1	SUZ; 5	SUZ; 6	SUG; 8	FUJ; 2	SUZ; Ret	SUZ; 5			5th	72
1989	Cabin Racing Heroes	SUZ; 7	FUJ; Ret	MIN; 12	SUZ; 13	SUG; 8	FUJ; 20	SUZ; 17	SUZ; 6				19th	1
1990	Super Evolution Racing	SUZ; 20	FUJ	MIN; 14	SUZ; 11	SUG; 8	FUJ; 11	FUJ; Ret	SUZ; 22	FUJ; 11	SUZ; 12		NC	0
1991	Universal Racing	SUZ; 11	AUT; DNS	FUJ; 8	MIN; 5	SUZ; 5	SUG; 9	FUJ; DNQ	SUZ; 11	FUJ; C	SUZ; 12	FUJ; 11	15th	4
1992	Universal Racing	SUZ; Ret	FUJ; Ret	MIN; Ret	SUZ; 7	AUT; Ret	SUG; 2	FUJ; 2	FUJ; 1	SUZ; 17	FUJ; 1	SUZ; Ret	**2nd**	**30**
1993	Universal Racing	SUZ; 6	FUJ; 4	MIN; Ret	SUZ; Ret	AUT; C	SUG; 4	FUJ; C	FUJ; 1	SUZ; 3	FUJ; 5	SUZ; Ret	5th	22
1994	Mirai Corporation	SUZ; 7	FUJ; 6	MIN	SUZ	SUG	FUJ	SUZ	FUJ	FUJ	SUZ		16th	1
1995	Hoshino Racing	SUZ; 5	FUJ; C	MIN; 2	SUZ; 1	SUG; Ret	**FUJ**; 3	TOK; 6	FUJ; 3	SUZ; 1			**1st**	**34**
1996	Team Impul	SUZ; 18	MIN; Ret	FUJ; 12	TOK; 11	SUZ; 9	SUG; 10	FUJ; 7	**MIN**; 4	SUZ; 3	FUJ; Ret		12th	7
1997	Mirai	SUZ; 8	MIN; 5	FUJ; 7	SUZ; Ret	SUG; 4	FUJ; 16	MIN; 9	MOT; 8	FUJ; Ret	SUZ; 9		13th	5

=== Complete Japanese Touring Car Championship results ===
(key) (Races in bold indicate pole position) (Races in italics indicate fastest lap)

Year	Team	Car	Class	1	2	3	4	5	6	7	8	9	10	11	12	13	14	15	16	DC	Pts
1990	Impul	Nissan Skyline GT-R	JTC-1	NIS; 1	SUG; 1	SUZ; 2	TSU; 1	SEN; 1	FUJ; 1											1st	230
1991	Impul	Nissan Skyline GT-R	JTC-1	SUG; 1	SUZ; Ret	TSU; 3	SEN; 1	AUT; 2	FUJ; 1											3rd	174
1993	Nismo	Nissan Skyline GT-R	JTC-1	MIN; 14	AUT; 5	SUG; 3	SUZ; 5	AID; 2	TSU; 1	TOK; 2	SEN; 18	FUJ; 3								3rd	106
1995	Nismo	Nissan Sunny		FUJ; 1	FUJ; 2	SUG; 1; 23	SUG; 2 Ret	TOK; 1; 11	TOK; 2; 6	SUZ; 1; 7	SUZ; 2; 21	MIN; 1 Ret	MIN; 2 Ret	AID; 1; 21	AID; 2; 14	SEN; 1; 8	SEN; 2; 7	FUJ; 1 NC	FUJ; 2 Ret	17th	16

=== Complete JGTC results ===
(key) (Races in bold indicate pole position) (Races in italics indicate fastest lap)

Year	Team	Car	Class	1	2	3	4	5	6	7	DC	Pts
1994	Team Zexel	Nissan Skyline GT-R	GT1	FUJ; Ret	SEN; 6	FUJ; 6	SUG; 2	MIN; Ret			10th	27
1995	Nismo	Nissan Skyline GT-R	GT1	SUZ; 2	FUJ; 4	SEN; 6	FUJ; 2	SUG; 5	MIN; 7		**3rd**	**58**
1996	Nismo	Nissan Skyline GT-R	GT500	SUZ; 6	FUJ; Ret	SEN; 17	FUJ; 5	SUG; 3	MIN; 10		11th	27
1997	TOYOTA Castrol TEAM	Toyota Supra	GT500	**SUZ**; 3	FUJ; 6	**SEN**; 3	FUJ; 3	MIN; 3	SUG; 4		**3rd**	**64**
1998	Toyota Castrol Team TOM'S	Toyota Supra	GT500	SUZ; 7	FUJ*; C	SEN; 6	FUJ; 11	MOT; Ret	MIN; 10	SUG; 2	9th	26
1999	Toyota Castrol Team TOM'S	Toyota Supra	GT500	SUZ; 3	FUJ; 4	SUG; 11	**MIN**; 2	FUJ; 15	TAI; 15	MOT; 10	9th	38
2000	Toyota Castrol Team TOM'S	Toyota Supra	GT500	MOT; 9	FUJ; Ret	SUG; 8	FUJ; 14	TAI; 12	MIN; 9	SUZ; 12	21st	7

*The race at Fuji Speedway was cancelled due to a large crash on the first lap and heavy fog afterwards.

=== Complete Formula One results ===
(key)

Year	Entrant	Chassis	Engine	1	2	3	4	5	6	7	8	9	10	11	12	13	14	15	16	WDC	Points
1993	Larrousse F1	Larrousse LH93	Lamborghini V12	RSA	BRA	EUR	SMR	ESP	MON	CAN	FRA	GBR	GER	HUN	BEL	ITA	POR	JPN; 12	AUS; 14	NC	0

=== NASCAR ===
(key) (Bold – Pole position awarded by qualifying time. Italics – Pole position earned by points standings or practice time. * – Most laps led.)

==== Busch Series ====
NASCAR Busch Series results
Year	Team	No.	Make	1	2	3	4	5	6	7	8	9	10	11	12	13	14	15	16	17	18	19	20	21	22	23	24	25	26	NBGNC	Pts	Ref
1996	Joe Bessey Motorsports	9	Chevy	DAY	CAR	RCH	ATL	NSV	DAR	BRI	HCY	NZH; 33	CLT	DOV	SBO	MYB	GLN	MLW	NHA	TAL	IRP	MCH	BRI	DAR	RCH	DOV	CLT	CAR	HOM	96th	64	

Sporting positions
Preceded by Inaugural	All-Japan Formula Three Champion; 1979	Succeeded by Shuroku Sasaki
Preceded by Marco Apicella	Japanese Formula 3000 Champion; 1995	Succeeded by Ralf Schumacher (Formula Nippon)
