= George Fouché =

South African racing driver (1965–2023)

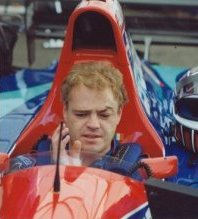
- Fouché in 1994
- Nationality: South African
- Born: George Robert Fouché; 15 May 1965 Pretoria, South Africa
- Died: 5 May 2023 (aged 57) Pretoria, South Africa

Awards
- 1989 The Hero Award from the Japanese Automobile Federation (see Fuji); 1984 Springbok Colours; 1984 Young South African Sportsman of the Year (nominated)

George Robert Fouché (nicknamed Fast Fouché; 15 May 1965 – 5 May 2023) was a South African international motorsport race car driver, Le Mans 24 Hour winner and South African Formula 1 Powerboat pilot. He retired from competition in 2005.

Fouché grew up on his father's brick factory, and by the age of six, he was able to drive a bulldozer. His passion for motorsport began when he started driving go-karts in races at the age of eight. This continued until he was able to race cars at the age of 16.

At the age of 16, Fouché got his first competition licence from Motorsport South Africa and started competing in motorsport while he was still not allowed to drive on public roads.

Fouché had a very large scar over his left eye that many believe is a result of a motorsport accident. In fact, he got the scar when on his 8th birthday - he was teaching someone to drive a tractor. While teaching him, the tractor accidentally jerked and George fell off and the tyre rode over the side of his head, causing a massive cut that went halfway around his head.

Due to his extensive travels between Japan and South Africa, Fouché was actually booked on the ill-fated South African Airways Flight 295, The Helderberg, which crashed off Mauritius on 28 November 1987 en route from Taiwan to South Africa, but missed the flight when his connecting flight from Japan to Taiwan was cancelled due to a typhoon.

On 2 April 2007, Fouché suffered a perforated ulcer which was misdiagnosed as pancreatitis. He spent 63 days in intensive care in Montana Hospital, Pretoria, South Africa and was released on 6 June 2007.

Fouché died following complications from a fall in Pretoria, on 5 May 2023, at the age of 57. According to his brother Pete, George had an accidental fall during load shedding in February 2023 and suffered a cut to the head and significant blood loss. The hospital managed to stop the bleeding and stitch the wound but did not give him a blood transfusion. Over the next two months, his health deteriorated and was admitted to Pretoria West Hospital on 1 May 2023.

== International racing career ==
At the age of 17, Fouché raced in the Kyalami World Sportscar Championship 1000 km on 10 December 1983 in a Kremer Racing Porsche CK5 with co-drivers Franz Konrad and Kees Kroesemeijer, but was disqualified for a push start.

While racing in round three of the 1989 Fuji Long Distance Series, Fouché came across the burning car of Oscar Larrauri that had just crashed. Oscar was still in the car, and noticing that the marshals were not equipped to deal with the fire, Fouché stopped his car and pulled Oscar out. Fouché eventually finished second in the race, which would eventually cost him the championship. Fouché received an impromptu "The Hero Award" from the Japanese Automobile Federation while on the podium.

While qualifying for the Fuji 1000 km race in October 1992, one of his car's tyres burst, sending him head-on into a concrete wall at 280 km/h. Fouché's foot was crushed and he spent seven months on crutches.

In 1993, Fouché test drove the Sasol Jordan Grand Prix Formula 1 car at the Silverstone Circuit in England.

=== 24 Hours of Le Mans ===
| Year | Co-Driver | Result |
|---|---|---|
| 1984 | Jürgen Lässig, (Germany); John Graham, (Canada) | DNF |
| 1985 | Mario Hytten, (Switzerland); Sarel van der Merwe, (South Africa) | 5th |
| 1986 | Emilio de Villota, (Spain); Fermín Vélez, (Spain) | 4th |
| 1987 | Franz Konrad, (Austria); Wayne Taylor, (South Africa) | 4th |
| 1988 | Kris Nissen, (Denmark); Harald Grohs, (Germany) | 8th |
| 1989 | Hideki Okada, (Japan); Masanori Sekiya, (Japan) | DNF |
| 1990 | Steven Andskär, (Sweden); Shunji Kasuya, (Japan) | 13th |
| 1991 | Steven Andskär, (Sweden) | DNF |
| 1992 | Stefan Johansson, (Sweden); Steven Andskär, (Sweden) | Category 2 winner |
| 1993 | Eje Elgh, (Sweden); Steven Andskär, (Sweden) | 6th |
| 1994 | Steven Andskär, (Sweden); Bob Wollek, (France) | 4th |
| 1995 | Steven Andskär, (Sweden); Thomas Danielsson, (Sweden) | DNA |
| 1996 | Steve Fossett, (United States); Stanley Dickens, (Sweden) | DNF |
| 1997 | Geoff Lees, (United Kingdom); Tiff Needell, (United Kingdom) | DNF |

=== World Sportscar Championship (Europe) ===
| . | 1983 | 1984 | 1985 | 1986 | 1987 | 1988 | 1989 | 1990 | 1991 |
| Points | 0 | 0 | 0 | 16 | 10 | 0 | 17 | 0 | 12 |
| Championship rank | N/A | N/A | N/A | 29th | 34th | N/A | 25th | N/A | 27th |

=== All Japan Sports Prototype Championship (Japan) ===
| . | 1985 | 1986 | 1987 | 1988 | 1989 | 1990 | 1991 |
|---|---|---|---|---|---|---|---|
| Points | 6 | N/A | N/A | 17 | 55 | 47 | 52 |
| Championship rank | 29th | N/A | N/A | 20th | 3rd | 5th | 8th |

=== Fuji Long Distance Series ===
| 1985 | Round 1 | Round 2 | Round 3 | Round 4 |
|---|---|---|---|---|
| Co-driver | N/A | N/A | Vern Schuppan, (Australia); Keiichi Suzuki, (Japan) | Vern Schuppan, (Australia); Keiichi Suzuki, (Japan) |
| Position | N/A | N/A | 6th | 6th |

| 1986 | Round 1 | Round 2 | Round 3 | Round 4 |
|---|---|---|---|---|
| Co-driver | Vern Schuppan, (Australia); Keiichi Suzuki, (Japan) | Vern Schuppan, (Australia); Keiichi Suzuki, (Japan) | Vern Schuppan, (Australia); Keiichi Suzuki, (Japan) | N/A |
| Position | DNF / Engine | 1st | 6th | N/A |

| 1987 | Round 1 | Round 2 | Round 3 | Round 4 |
|---|---|---|---|---|
| Co-driver | N/A | N/A | Franz Konrad, (Austria) | N/A |
| Position | N/A | N/A | 12 | N/A |

| 1988 | Round 1 | Round 2 | Round 3 | Round 4 |
|---|---|---|---|---|
| Co-driver | Vern Schuppan, (Australia) | Vern Schuppan, (Australia) | Vern Schuppan, (Australia) | Vern Schuppan, (Australia) |
| Position | DNF / Electrics | DNF / Engine; Fastest Lap | DNF / Engine | 10 |

| 1989 | Round 1 | Round 2 | Round 3 | Round 4 |
|---|---|---|---|---|
| Co-driver | Steven Andskär, (Sweden) | Steven Andskär, (Sweden) | Steven Andskär, (Sweden) | Steven Andskär, (Sweden) |
| Position | DNF / hub bearing | 2nd | 2nd | 2nd |

| 1990 | Round 1 | Round 2 | Round 3 | Round 4 |
|---|---|---|---|---|
| Co-driver | Steven Andskär, (Sweden) | Steven Andskär, (Sweden) , Shunji Kasuya (Japan) | Steven Andskär, (Sweden) | Steven Andskär, (Sweden) |
| Position | 3rd | Unknown | 2nd | DNF / engine |

=== IMSA ===
Fouché competed in the second round of the 1993 Imsa series in Miami alongside Wayne Taylor in an Intrepid RM1 Chevrolet GTP. They finished fifth.

Fouché also competed in the 1994 24 Hours of Daytona alongside fellow South Africans Hilton Cowie and Stephen Watson driving a Lotus Esprit S300 in the GTU class. On the 354th lap, the car suffered engine failure.

== South African racing career ==
- F1 Powerboat (South Africa)
- Sascar
  2000 Champion
- Wesbank V8
- Formula Atlantic

Fouché competed in the South African Formula Atlantic Championship in 1983 before starting his international career in the World Sportscar Championship in Europe in 1984.

- Group One Racing
- Group N
- Formula Ford
- Rally

== Post racing career ==
Fouché owned Dermalamp South Africa, a company that manufactures and sells phototherapy equipment for the management of Psoriasis and Eczema.
