= 1991 All Japan Sports Prototype Car Endurance Championship =

Seasons
- ← 1990 1992 →

The 1991 All Japan Sports Prototype Car Endurance Championship was the ninth season of the All Japan Sports Prototype Championship. The 1991 champion was the #23 Nissan Motorsports Nissan R91CP driven by Kazuyoshi Hoshino and Toshio Suzuki.

== Schedule ==
All races were held in Japan.

Round	Race	Circuit	Date
1	All Japan Fuji 500 km	Fuji Speedway	10 March
2	All Japan Fuji 1000 km	Fuji Speedway	5 May
3	All Japan Fuji 500 Miles	Fuji Speedway	21 July
4	International Suzuka 1000 km	Suzuka Circuit	25 August
5	SUGO Inter 500 km	Sportsland SUGO	16 September
6	Interchallenge Fuji 1000 km	Fuji Speedway	6 October
7	SUGO Inter 500 Miles	Sportsland SUGO	3 November

== Entry list ==
Team	Make	Car	Engine	No.	Drivers	Tyre	Rounds
Nissan Motorsports	Nissan	Nissan R90CP; Nissan R91CP	Nissan VRH35Z 3.5 L Twin Turbo V8	1	(Japan) Masahiro Hasemi	B	All
Nissan Motorsports	Nissan	Nissan R90CP; Nissan R91CP	Nissan VRH35Z 3.5 L Twin Turbo V8	1	(Sweden) Anders Olofsson	B	All
Nissan Motorsports	Nissan	Nissan R90CP; Nissan R91CP	Nissan VRH35Z 3.5 L Twin Turbo V8	23	(Japan) Kazuyoshi Hoshino	B	All
Nissan Motorsports	Nissan	Nissan R90CP; Nissan R91CP	Nissan VRH35Z 3.5 L Twin Turbo V8	23	(Japan) Toshio Suzuki	B	All
Team Taisan	Porsche	Porsche 962C	Porsche 935/82 3.0 L Twin Turbo F6	2	(Japan) Kunimitsu Takahashi	Y	1–2
Team Taisan	Porsche	Porsche 962C	Porsche 935/82 3.0 L Twin Turbo F6	2	(Sweden) Stanley Dickens	Y	1–2
Team Taisan	Porsche	Porsche 962C	Porsche 935/82 3.0 L Twin Turbo F6	2	(United Kingdom) Will Hoy	Y	2
Team Taisan	Porsche	Porsche 962C	Porsche 962/83 3.2 L Twin Turbo F6	3	(United Kingdom) Will Hoy	Y	1
Team Taisan	Porsche	Porsche 962C	Porsche 962/83 3.2 L Twin Turbo F6	3	(Norway) Harald Huysman	Y	1
Navi Connection Racing	Alexel	Alexel Autorama C91	Ford DFR 3.5 L V8	3	(Japan) Kaoru Iida	D	5–7
Navi Connection Racing	Alexel	Alexel Autorama C91	Ford DFR 3.5 L V8	3	(Japan) Taku Akaike	D	5–7
The Alpha Racing	Porsche	Porsche 962C	Porsche 962/83 3.2 L Twin Turbo F6	7	(United Kingdom) Tiff Needell	Y	1–3
The Alpha Racing	Porsche	Porsche 962C	Porsche 962/83 3.2 L Twin Turbo F6	7	(United Kingdom) Anthony Reid	Y	1–3
The Alpha Racing	Porsche	Porsche 962C	Porsche 962/83 3.2 L Twin Turbo F6	7	(Brazil) Raul Boesel	Y	6
The Alpha Racing	Porsche	Porsche 962C	Porsche 962/83 3.2 L Twin Turbo F6	7	(France) Bob Wollek	Y	6
The Alpha Racing	Porsche	Porsche 962C	Porsche 962/83 3.2 L Twin Turbo F6	7	(United Kingdom) Jonathan Palmer	Y	7
The Alpha Racing	Porsche	Porsche 962C	Porsche 962/83 3.2 L Twin Turbo F6	7	(Argentina) Oscar Larrauri	Y	7
TWR Suntec Jaguar	Jaguar	Jaguar XJR-11	Rover V64V 3.5 L Twin Turbo V6	18	(Italy) Mauro Martini	G	2–6
TWR Suntec Jaguar	Jaguar	Jaguar XJR-11	Rover V64V 3.5 L Twin Turbo V6	18	(United States) Jeff Krosnoff	G	2–6
TWR Suntec Jaguar	Jaguar	Jaguar XJR-11	Rover V64V 3.5 L Twin Turbo V6	18	(Denmark) John Nielsen	G	3–4
TWR Suntec Jaguar	Jaguar	Jaguar XJR-14	Cosworth HB 3.5 L V8	18	(Italy) Mauro Martini	G	7
TWR Suntec Jaguar	Jaguar	Jaguar XJR-14	Cosworth HB 3.5 L V8	18	(United States) Jeff Krosnoff	G	7
TWR Suntec Jaguar	Jaguar	Jaguar XJR-14	Cosworth HB 3.5 L V8	17	(Australia) David Brabham	G	7
TWR Suntec Jaguar	Jaguar	Jaguar XJR-14	Cosworth HB 3.5 L V8	17	(Italy) Teo Fabi	G	7
Ao Racing	Spice	Spice SE90C	Ford DFZ 3.5 L V8	21	(Japan) Hideshi Matsuda	D	5–6
Ao Racing	Spice	Spice SE90C	Ford DFZ 3.5 L V8	21	(Japan) Hideo Fukuyama	D	5–6
Ao Racing	Spice	Spice SE90C	Ford DFZ 3.5 L V8	21	(Japan) Tomiko Yoshikawa	D	6
Team LeMans	Nissan	Nissan R90C; Nissan R91CP	Nissan VRH35Z 3.5 L Twin Turbo V8	25	(Japan) Hideki Okada	Y	All
Team LeMans	Nissan	Nissan R90C; Nissan R91CP	Nissan VRH35Z 3.5 L Twin Turbo V8	25	(Japan) Takao Wada	Y	1–4
Team LeMans	Nissan	Nissan R90C; Nissan R91CP	Nissan VRH35Z 3.5 L Twin Turbo V8	25	(Japan) Masahiko Kageyama	Y	3–7
Team LeMans	Nissan	Nissan R90C; Nissan R91CP	Nissan VRH35Z 3.5 L Twin Turbo V8	25	(Brazil) Maurizio Sandro Sala	Y	4
From A Racing	Nissan	Nissan R90CK	Nissan VRH35Z 3.5 L Twin Turbo V8	27	(Japan) Akihiko Nakaya	B	All
From A Racing	Nissan	Nissan R90CK	Nissan VRH35Z 3.5 L Twin Turbo V8	27	(Germany) Volker Weidler	B	All
From A Racing	Nissan	Nissan R90CK	Nissan VRH35Z 3.5 L Twin Turbo V8	27	(Sweden) Thomas Danielsson	B	2
Toyota Team TOM'S	Toyota	Toyota 90C-V; Toyota 91C-V	Toyota R36V 3.6 L Turbo V8	36	(Japan) Masanori Sekiya	B	All
Toyota Team TOM'S	Toyota	Toyota 90C-V; Toyota 91C-V	Toyota R36V 3.6 L Turbo V8	36	(Japan) Hitoshi Ogawa	B	All
Toyota Team TOM'S	Toyota	Toyota 90C-V; Toyota 91C-V	Toyota R36V 3.6 L Turbo V8	36	(United Kingdom) Andy Wallace	B	2, 4
Toyota Team TOM'S	Toyota	Toyota 90C-V; Toyota 91C-V	Toyota R36V 3.6 L Turbo V8	37	(United Kingdom) Geoff Lees	B	All
Toyota Team TOM'S	Toyota	Toyota 90C-V; Toyota 91C-V	Toyota R36V 3.6 L Turbo V8	37	(Sweden) Eje Elgh	B	2–7
Toyota Team TOM'S	Toyota	Toyota 90C-V; Toyota 91C-V	Toyota R36V 3.6 L Turbo V8	37	(France) Pierre-Henri Raphanel	B	1
Toyota Team TOM'S	Toyota	Toyota 90C-V; Toyota 91C-V	Toyota R36V 3.6 L Turbo V8	37	(United Kingdom) Andy Wallace	B	4, 6
Toyota Team SARD	Toyota	Toyota 90C-V; Toyota 91C-V	Toyota R36V 3.6 L Turbo V8	38	(Austria) Roland Ratzenberger	D	All
Toyota Team SARD	Toyota	Toyota 90C-V; Toyota 91C-V	Toyota R36V 3.6 L Turbo V8	38	(Japan) Naoki Nagasaka	D	1–4
Toyota Team SARD	Toyota	Toyota 90C-V; Toyota 91C-V	Toyota R36V 3.6 L Turbo V8	38	(France) Pierre-Henri Raphanel	D	3–7
Team Fedco	Spice	Spice SE91C	Ford DFZ 3.5 L V8	77	(Japan) Hisashi Yokoshima	G	2–3
Team Fedco	Spice	Spice SE91C	Ford DFZ 3.5 L V8	77	(Japan) Kiyoshi Misaki	G	2–3
Team Schuppan	Porsche	Porsche 962C	Porsche 962/83 3.0 L Twin Turbo F6	91	(United States) Hurley Haywood	D	1
Team Schuppan	Porsche	Porsche 962C	Porsche 962/83 3.0 L Twin Turbo F6	91	(United Kingdom) James Weaver	D	1
Team 0123	Porsche	Porsche 962C	Porsche 935/83 3.0 L Twin Turbo F6	91	(United Kingdom) Julian Bailey	D	4
Team 0123	Porsche	Porsche 962C	Porsche 935/83 3.0 L Twin Turbo F6	91	(United Kingdom) Kenny Acheson	D	4, 6
Team 0123	Porsche	Porsche 962C	Porsche 935/83 3.0 L Twin Turbo F6	91	(United Kingdom) James Weaver	D	6
Trust Racing	Porsche	Porsche 962C	Porsche 935/83 3.0 L Twin Turbo F6	100	(South Africa) George Fouché	D	All
Trust Racing	Porsche	Porsche 962C	Porsche 935/83 3.0 L Twin Turbo F6	100	(Sweden) Steven Andskär	D	All
Mazdaspeed	Mazda	Mazda 787; Mazda 787B	Mazda R26B 2.6 L 4-rotor	201	(Japan) Tetsuya Ota	D	1
Mazdaspeed	Mazda	Mazda 787; Mazda 787B	Mazda R26B 2.6 L 4-rotor	201	(Belgium) Pierre Dieudonné	D	1, 7
Mazdaspeed	Mazda	Mazda 787; Mazda 787B	Mazda R26B 2.6 L 4-rotor	201	(Republic of Ireland) David Kennedy	D	1–2, 4–5
Mazdaspeed	Mazda	Mazda 787; Mazda 787B	Mazda R26B 2.6 L 4-rotor	201	(United Kingdom) Johnny Herbert	D	3, 6
Mazdaspeed	Mazda	Mazda 787; Mazda 787B	Mazda R26B 2.6 L 4-rotor	201	(Belgium) Bertrand Gachot	D	3
Mazdaspeed	Mazda	Mazda 787; Mazda 787B	Mazda R26B 2.6 L 4-rotor	201	(Japan) Yojiro Terada	D	4–5, 7
Mazdaspeed	Mazda	Mazda 787; Mazda 787B	Mazda R26B 2.6 L 4-rotor	201	(Japan) Takashi Yorino	D	4
Mazdaspeed	Mazda	Mazda 787; Mazda 787B	Mazda R26B 2.6 L 4-rotor	201	(Brazil) Maurizio Sandro Sala	D	6
Mazdaspeed	Mazda	Mazda 787; Mazda 787B	Mazda R26B 2.6 L 4-rotor	202	(Japan) Takashi Yorino	D	1–3, 5–7
Mazdaspeed	Mazda	Mazda 787; Mazda 787B	Mazda R26B 2.6 L 4-rotor	202	(Japan) Yojiro Terada	D	1–3
Mazdaspeed	Mazda	Mazda 787; Mazda 787B	Mazda R26B 2.6 L 4-rotor	202	(Japan) Tetsuya Ota	D	2, 5
Mazdaspeed	Mazda	Mazda 787; Mazda 787B	Mazda R26B 2.6 L 4-rotor	202	(Republic of Ireland) David Kennedy	D	6–7
Pleasure Racing	Mazda	Mazda 767B	Mazda RE13J 2.6 L 4-rotor	230	(Japan) Tetsuji Shiratori	D	All
Pleasure Racing	Mazda	Mazda 767B	Mazda RE13J 2.6 L 4-rotor	230	(Japan) Shuji Fujii	D	All
Pleasure Racing	Mazda	Mazda 767B	Mazda RE13J 2.6 L 4-rotor	230	(Japan) Masatomo Shimizu	D	1–6

== Season results ==
Season results as follows:

Round	Circuit	Winning team
Round	Circuit	Winning drivers
1	Mt. Fuji	#23 Nissan Motorsports Nissan R91CP
1	Mt. Fuji	(Japan) Kazuyoshi Hoshino (Japan) Toshio Suzuki
2	Mt. Fuji; Report	#23 Nissan Motorsports Nissan R91CP
2	Mt. Fuji; Report	(Japan) Kazuyoshi Hoshino (Japan) Toshio Suzuki
3	Mt. Fuji	#36 Toyota Team TOM'S Toyota 91C-V
3	Mt. Fuji	(Japan) Hitoshi Ogawa (Japan) Masanori Sekiya
4	Suzuka Circuit; Report	#38 Toyota Team SARD Toyota 91C-V
4	Suzuka Circuit; Report	(Austria) Roland Ratzenberger (France) Pierre-Henri Raphanel (Japan) Naoki Nagasaka
5	Sportsland SUGO; Report	#37 Toyota Team TOM'S Toyota 91C-V
5	Sportsland SUGO; Report	(United Kingdom) Geoff Lees (Sweden) Eje Elgh
6	Mt. Fuji	#23 Nissan Motorsports Nissan R91CP
6	Mt. Fuji	(Japan) Kazuyoshi Hoshino (Japan) Toshio Suzuki
7	Sportsland SUGO	#17 TWR Suntech Jaguar XJR-14
7	Sportsland SUGO	(Australia) David Brabham (Italy) Teo Fabi

== Point Ranking ==
=== Drivers ===
Rank	Drivers	Number/Team	Points	Wins
1	(Japan) Kazuyoshi Hoshino (Japan) Toshio Suzuki	#23 Nissan Motorsports Nissan R91CP	87	3
2	(Japan) Hitoshi Ogawa (Japan) Masanori Sekiya	#36 Toyota Team TOM'S Toyota 91C-V	85	1
3	(United Kingdom) Geoff Lees	#37 Toyota Team TOM'S Toyota 91C-V	54	1
4	(Germany) Volker Weidler (Japan) Akihiko Nakaya	#27 From A Racing Nissan R90CK	52	0
5	(South Africa) George Fouché (Sweden) Steven Andskär	#100 Trust Racing Porsche 962C	52	0
