= 1990 All Japan Sports Prototype Car Endurance Championship =

Seasons
- ← 1989 1991 →

The 1990 All Japan Sports Prototype Car Endurance Championship was the eighth season of the All Japan Sports Prototype Championship. The 1990 champion was the #24 Nissan Motorsports Nissan R91CP driven by Masahiro Hasemi and Anders Olofsson.

== Schedule ==
All races were held in Japan.

Round	Race	Circuit	Date
1	JAF Grand Prix All Japan Fuji 500 km	Fuji Speedway	11 March
2	Interchallenge Fuji 1000 km	Fuji Speedway	5 May
3	All Japan Fuji 500 Miles	Fuji Speedway	22 July
4	International Suzuka 1000 km	Suzuka Circuit	26 August
5	SUGO International 500 km	Sportsland SUGO	16 September
6	All Japan Fuji 1000 km	Fuji Speedway	7 October

== Entry list ==
Team	Make	Car	No.	Engine	Drivers	Tyre	Rounds
Alpha Nova Racing	Porsche	Porsche 962C	Porsche 956/82 3.2 L Twin Turbo F6	1	(Japan) Kunimitsu Takahashi	Y	All
Alpha Nova Racing	Porsche	Porsche 962C	Porsche 956/82 3.2 L Twin Turbo F6	1	(Japan) Kazuo Mogi	Y	All
Alpha Nova Racing	Porsche	Porsche 962C	Porsche 935/82 3.0 L Twin Turbo F6	2	(United Kingdom) Will Hoy	B	All
Alpha Nova Racing	Porsche	Porsche 962C	Porsche 935/82 3.0 L Twin Turbo F6	2	(Sweden) Stanley Dickens	B	1–2, 4–6
Alpha Nova Racing	Porsche	Porsche 962C	Porsche 935/82 3.0 L Twin Turbo F6	2	(Japan) Kenji Takahashi	B	2
Alpha Nova Racing	Porsche	Porsche 962C	Porsche 935/82 3.0 L Twin Turbo F6	2	(United Kingdom) David Sears	B	3
Alpha Nova Racing	Porsche	Porsche 962C	Porsche 935/83 3.0 L Twin Turbo F6	7	(United Kingdom) Tiff Needell	Y	All
Alpha Nova Racing	Porsche	Porsche 962C	Porsche 935/83 3.0 L Twin Turbo F6	7	(Greece) Costas Los	Y	1–2
Alpha Nova Racing	Porsche	Porsche 962C	Porsche 935/83 3.0 L Twin Turbo F6	7	(United Kingdom) Derek Bell	Y	2–6
Alpha Nova Racing	Porsche	Porsche 962C	Porsche 935/83 3.0 L Twin Turbo F6	7	(United Kingdom) Anthony Reid	Y	4, 6
Alpha Nova Racing	Porsche	Porsche 962C	Porsche 935/82 3.0 L Twin Turbo F6	20	(Japan) Chiyomi Totani	D	1, 3–4
Alpha Nova Racing	Porsche	Porsche 962C	Porsche 935/82 3.0 L Twin Turbo F6	20	(Spain) Luis Pérez-Sala	D	1
Alpha Nova Racing	Porsche	Porsche 962C	Porsche 935/82 3.0 L Twin Turbo F6	20	(Germany) Manuel Reuter	D	1–2, 4
Alpha Nova Racing	Porsche	Porsche 962C	Porsche 935/82 3.0 L Twin Turbo F6	20	(Brazil) Maurizio Sandro Sala	D	2
Alpha Nova Racing	Porsche	Porsche 962C	Porsche 935/82 3.0 L Twin Turbo F6	20	(Canada) Allen Berg	D	3
Davey Racing	Porsche	Porsche 962C	Porsche 935/82 3.0 L Twin Turbo F6	19	(United Kingdom) Tim Lee-Davey	D	1
Davey Racing	Porsche	Porsche 962C	Porsche 935/82 3.0 L Twin Turbo F6	19	(Italy) Bruno Giacomelli	D	1
Ao Racing	Spice	Spice SE90C	Ford DFZ 3.5 L V8	21	(Greece) Costas Los	D	3–5
Ao Racing	Spice	Spice SE90C	Ford DFZ 3.5 L V8	21	(Japan) Katsutomo Kaneishi	D	3–5
Ao Racing	Spice	Spice SE90C	Ford DFZ 3.5 L V8	21	(Japan) Kazuhiko Oda	D	3
Ao Racing	Spice	Spice SE90C	Ford DFZ 3.5 L V8	21	(Japan) Hideshi Matsuda	D	4–5
Nissan Motorsports	Nissan	Nissan R90CP	Nissan VRH35Z 3.5 L Twin Turbo V8	23	(Japan) Kazuyoshi Hoshino	D B	All
Nissan Motorsports	Nissan	Nissan R90CP	Nissan VRH35Z 3.5 L Twin Turbo V8	23	(Japan) Toshio Suzuki	D B	All
Nissan Motorsports	Nissan	Nissan R90CP	Nissan VRH35Z 3.5 L Twin Turbo V8	24	(Japan) Masahiro Hasemi	D	All
Nissan Motorsports	Nissan	Nissan R90CP	Nissan VRH35Z 3.5 L Twin Turbo V8	24	(Sweden) Anders Olofsson	D	All
From A Racing	Porsche	Porsche 962C	Porsche 956/82 3.2 L Twin Turbo F6	27	(Japan) Akihiko Nakaya	B	All
From A Racing	Porsche	Porsche 962C	Porsche 956/82 3.2 L Twin Turbo F6	27	(Germany) Volker Weidler	B	All
From A Racing	Porsche	Porsche 962C	Porsche 956/82 3.2 L Twin Turbo F6	27	(Japan) Yukihiro Hane	B	All
Takefuji Racing Team	Porsche	Porsche 962C	Porsche 935/83 3.0 L Twin Turbo F6	33	(United Kingdom) Johnny Herbert	D	All
Takefuji Racing Team	Porsche	Porsche 962C	Porsche 935/83 3.0 L Twin Turbo F6	33	(France) Bob Wollek	D	1, 4–5
Takefuji Racing Team	Porsche	Porsche 962C	Porsche 935/83 3.0 L Twin Turbo F6	33	(Sweden) Rickard Rydell	D	2–4, 6
Takefuji Racing Team	Porsche	Porsche 962C	Porsche 935/83 3.0 L Twin Turbo F6	33	(United Kingdom) Eddie Irvine	D	2
Toyota Team TOM'S	Toyota	Toyota 90C-V	Toyota R32V 3.2 L Turbo V8 (Rd. 1–2); Toyota R36V 3.6 L Turbo V8 (Rd. 3–6)	36	(Japan) Hitoshi Ogawa	B	All
Toyota Team TOM'S	Toyota	Toyota 90C-V	Toyota R32V 3.2 L Turbo V8 (Rd. 1–2); Toyota R36V 3.6 L Turbo V8 (Rd. 3–6)	36	(Japan) Masanori Sekiya	B	1–5
Toyota Team TOM'S	Toyota	Toyota 90C-V	Toyota R32V 3.2 L Turbo V8 (Rd. 1–2); Toyota R36V 3.6 L Turbo V8 (Rd. 3–6)	36	(Japan) Keiichi Suzuki	B	4, 6
Toyota Team TOM'S	Toyota	Toyota 90C-V	Toyota R32V 3.2 L Turbo V8 (Rd. 1–2); Toyota R36V 3.6 L Turbo V8 (Rd. 3–6)	36	(Japan) Takuya Kurosawa	B	6
Toyota Team TOM'S	Toyota	Toyota 90C-V	Toyota R32V 3.2 L Turbo V8 (Rd. 1–2); Toyota R36V 3.6 L Turbo V8 (Rd. 3–6)	37	(United Kingdom) Geoff Lees	B	4–5
Toyota Team TOM'S	Toyota	Toyota 90C-V	Toyota R32V 3.2 L Turbo V8 (Rd. 1–2); Toyota R36V 3.6 L Turbo V8 (Rd. 3–6)	37	(France) Pierre-Henri Raphanel	B	4–6
Toyota Team TOM'S	Toyota	Toyota 90C-V	Toyota R32V 3.2 L Turbo V8 (Rd. 1–2); Toyota R36V 3.6 L Turbo V8 (Rd. 3–6)	37	(Japan) Hitoshi Ogawa	B	6
Toyota Team TOM'S	Toyota	Toyota 90C-V	Toyota R32V 3.2 L Turbo V8 (Rd. 1–2); Toyota R36V 3.6 L Turbo V8 (Rd. 3–6)	37	(Japan) Masanori Sekiya	B	6
Toyota Team SARD	Toyota	Toyota 89C-V	Toyota R32V 3.2 L Turbo V8	39	(Austria) Roland Ratzenberger	D	1–2
Toyota Team SARD	Toyota	Toyota 89C-V	Toyota R32V 3.2 L Turbo V8	39	(Japan) Naoki Nagasaka	D	1–2
Toyota Team SARD	Toyota	Toyota 89C-V	Toyota R32V 3.2 L Turbo V8	39	(France) Pierre-Henri Raphanel	D	1–2
Toyota Team SARD	Toyota	Toyota 90C-V	Toyota R36V 3.6 L Turbo V8	39	(Austria) Roland Ratzenberger	D	All
Toyota Team SARD	Toyota	Toyota 90C-V	Toyota R36V 3.6 L Turbo V8	39	(Japan) Naoki Nagasaka	D	All
Omron Racing	Porsche	Porsche 962C	Porsche 935/83 3.0 L Twin Turbo F6	55	(Sweden) Eje Elgh	D	All
Omron Racing	Porsche	Porsche 962C	Porsche 935/83 3.0 L Twin Turbo F6	55	(Australia) Vern Schuppan	D	1–4
Omron Racing	Porsche	Porsche 962C	Porsche 935/83 3.0 L Twin Turbo F6	55	(Australia) Tomas Mezera	D	2–6
Team LeMans	Nissan	Nissan R89C	Nissan VRH35 3.5 L Twin Turbo V8	85	(Japan) Osamu Nakako	Y	All
Team LeMans	Nissan	Nissan R89C	Nissan VRH35 3.5 L Twin Turbo V8	85	(Japan) Takao Wada	Y	All
Team LeMans	Nissan	Nissan R89C	Nissan VRH35 3.5 L Twin Turbo V8	85	(Brazil) Maurizio Sandro Sala	Y	4
British Barn Racing	British Barn	British Barn BB90R	Ford DFZ 3.5 L V8	88	(Japan) Jiro Yoneyama	D	4–6
British Barn Racing	British Barn	British Barn BB90R	Ford DFZ 3.5 L V8	88	(Japan) Hideo Fukuyama	D	4, 6
British Barn Racing	British Barn	British Barn BB90R	Ford DFZ 3.5 L V8	88	(Japan) Tsunehisa Asai	D	4–5
British Barn Racing	British Barn	British Barn BB90R	Ford DFZ 3.5 L V8	88	(Japan) Hisatoyo Goto	D	5–6
Trust Racing	Porsche	Porsche 962C	Porsche 935/83 3.0 L Twin Turbo F6	100	(South Africa) George Fouché	D	All
Trust Racing	Porsche	Porsche 962C	Porsche 935/83 3.0 L Twin Turbo F6	100	(Sweden) Steven Andskär	D	All
Mazdaspeed	Mazda	Mazda 767; Mazda 767B	Mazda RE13J 2.6 L 4-rotor	201	(Republic of Ireland) David Kennedy	D	1, 3–6
Mazdaspeed	Mazda	Mazda 767; Mazda 767B	Mazda RE13J 2.6 L 4-rotor	201	(Japan) Takashi Yorino	D	1–2
Mazdaspeed	Mazda	Mazda 767; Mazda 767B	Mazda RE13J 2.6 L 4-rotor	201	(Japan) Yojiro Terada	D	2, 4
Mazdaspeed	Mazda	Mazda 767; Mazda 767B	Mazda RE13J 2.6 L 4-rotor	201	(Belgium) Pierre Dieudonné	D	3–6
Mazdaspeed	Mazda	Mazda 767; Mazda 767B	Mazda RE13J 2.6 L 4-rotor	202	(Japan) Yoshimi Katayama	D	1–5
Mazdaspeed	Mazda	Mazda 767; Mazda 767B	Mazda RE13J 2.6 L 4-rotor	202	(Belgium) Pierre Dieudonné	D	1–2
Mazdaspeed	Mazda	Mazda 767; Mazda 767B	Mazda RE13J 2.6 L 4-rotor	202	(Japan) Yojiro Terada	D	1, 3, 5–6
Mazdaspeed	Mazda	Mazda 767; Mazda 767B	Mazda RE13J 2.6 L 4-rotor	202	(Republic of Ireland) David Kennedy	D	2
Mazdaspeed	Mazda	Mazda 767; Mazda 767B	Mazda RE13J 2.6 L 4-rotor	202	(Japan) Takashi Yorino	D	3–6
Mazdaspeed	Mazda	Mazda 767; Mazda 767B	Mazda RE13J 2.6 L 4-rotor	202	(Japan) Tetsuya Ota	D	4
Mazdaspeed	Mazda	Mazda 767; Mazda 767B	Mazda RE13J 2.6 L 4-rotor	203	(Japan) Yoshimi Katayama	D	6
Mazdaspeed	Mazda	Mazda 767; Mazda 767B	Mazda RE13J 2.6 L 4-rotor	203	(Brazil) Maurizio Sandro Sala	D	6
Mazdaspeed	Mazda	Mazda 767; Mazda 767B	Mazda RE13J 2.6 L 4-rotor	203	(Japan) Tetsuya Ota	D	6
Pleasure Racing	Mazda	Mazda 757	Mazda RE13G 2.0 L 3-rotor	230	(Japan) Tetsuji Shiratori	D	All
Pleasure Racing	Mazda	Mazda 757	Mazda RE13G 2.0 L 3-rotor	230	(Japan) Shuji Fujii	D	All
Pleasure Racing	Mazda	Mazda 757	Mazda RE13G 2.0 L 3-rotor	230	(Japan) Keiichi Mizutani	D	4, 6
Pleasure Racing	Mazda	Mazda 757	Mazda RE13G 2.0 L 3-rotor	230	(Japan) Seisaku Suzuki	D	2–3, 5
Lenox Racing	Mazda	Mazda 757	Mazda RE13G 2.0 L 3-rotor	240	(Japan) Kazuhiko Oda	D	1–2, 6
Lenox Racing	Mazda	Mazda 757	Mazda RE13G 2.0 L 3-rotor	240	(Japan) Keiichi Mizutani	D	1–2
Lenox Racing	Mazda	Mazda 757	Mazda RE13G 2.0 L 3-rotor	240	(Japan) Toshihiko Nogami	D	2, 6

== Season results ==
Overall winner in bold. Season results as follows:

Round	Circuit	Winning team
Round	Circuit	Winning drivers
1	Mt. Fuji	#36 Toyota Team TOM'S Toyota 90C-V
1	Mt. Fuji	(Japan) Hitoshi Ogawa (Japan) Masanori Sekiya
2	Mt. Fuji	**Race Cancelled**
3	Mt. Fuji	#24 Nissan Motorsports Nissan R90CP
3	Mt. Fuji	(Japan) Masahiro Hasemi (Sweden) Anders Olofsson
4	Suzuka Circuit; **Report**	#23 Nissan Motorsports Nissan R90CP
4	Suzuka Circuit; **Report**	(Japan) Kazuyoshi Hoshino (Japan) Toshio Suzuki
5	Sportsland SUGO	#24 Nissan Motorsports Nissan R90CP
5	Sportsland SUGO	(Japan) Masahiro Hasemi (Sweden) Anders Olofsson
6	Mt. Fuji; **Report**	#38 Toyota Team SARD Toyota 89C-V
6	Mt. Fuji; **Report**	(Austria) Roland Ratzenberger (Japan) Naoki Nagasaka

== Point Ranking ==
=== Drivers ===
Rank	Drivers	Number/Team	Points	Wins	Distance
1	(Japan) **Masahiro Hasemi**	#24 Nissan Motorsports Nissan R90CP	67	2	2171.329 km
2	(Sweden) Anders Olofsson	#24 Nissan Motorsports Nissan R90CP	67	2	1570.479 km
3	(Japan) Kazuyoshi Hoshino	#23 Nissan Motorsports Nissan R90CP	67	1	2094.272 km
4	(Japan) Toshio Suzuki	#23 Nissan Motorsports Nissan R90CP	67	1	1696.405 km
5	(South Africa) George Fouché	#100 Trust Racing Porsche 962C	47	0	1669.178 km
6	(Sweden) Steven Andskär	#100 Trust Racing Porsche 962C	47	0	1112.97 km
7	(Sweden) Stanley Dickens	#2 Alpha Nova Racing Porsche 962C	43	0	1859.862 km
8	(United Kingdom) Will Hoy	#2 Alpha Nova Racing Porsche 962C	43	0	1105.556 km

=== Makes ===
Rank	Make	Points	Wins
1	Nissan	90	3
2	Porsche	69	0
3	Toyota	64	2
4	Mazda	12	0
5	Spice	1	0
