= 1990 Suzuka 1000km =

1990 1000 km Suzuka

Seasons
- ← 1989 1991 →

Layout of the Suzuka International Racing Course (1987-2002)

The 1990 1000 km of Suzuka was the fourth race of the 1990 All Japan Sports Prototype Car Endurance Championship. It was run on August 26, 1990.

== Official results ==
Class winners in bold. Results are as follows:

Pos	Class	No	Team	Drivers	Chassis	Tyre	Laps
1	**C1**	**23**	**Nissan Motorsports**	**(Japan) Kazuyoshi Hoshino (Japan) Masahiro Hasemi**	**Nissan R90CP**	B	**171**
2	C1	27	From A Racing	(Japan) Akihiko Nakaya (Germany) Volker Weidler (Japan) Yukihiro Hane	Porsche 962C	B	171
3	C1	37	Toyota Team TOM'S	(United Kingdom) Geoff Lees (France) Pierre-Henri Raphanel	Toyota 90C-V	B	170
4	C1	2	Alpha Nova Racing	(United Kingdom) Stanley Dickens (United Kingdom) Will Hoy	Porsche 962C	B	169
5	C1	100	Trust Racing	(South Africa) George Fouche (Sweden) Steven Andskar	Porsche 962C	D	169
6	C1	1	Alpha Nova Racing	(Japan) Kunimitsu Takahashi (Japan) Kazuo Mogi	Porsche 962C	Y	169
7	C1	24	Nissan Motorsport	(Japan) Masahiro Hasemi (Sweden) Anders Olofsson	Nissan R90CP	D	168
8	C1	7	Alpha Nova Racing	(United Kingdom) Tiff Needell (United Kingdom) Derek Bell (United Kingdom) Anthony Reid	Porsche 962C	Y	168
9	C1	39	Toyota Team SARD	(Austria) Roland Ratzenberger (Japan) Naoki Nagasaka	Toyota 90C-V	D	165
10	**GTP**	**201**	**Mazdaspeed**	**(Belgium) Pierre Dieudonné (Japan) Yojiro Terada (Republic of Ireland) David Kennedy**	**Mazda 787**	D	**164**
11	C1	55	Omron Racing	(Australia) Vern Schuppan (Sweden) Eje Elgh (Australia) Tomas Mezera	Porsche 962C	Y	160
12	C1	88	British Barn Racing	(Japan) Jiro Yoneyama (Japan) Tsunehisa Asai (Japan) Hideo Fukuyama	British Barn BB90R-Ford	D	156
13	C1	21	Ao Racing	(Greece) Costas Los (Japan) Katsutomo Kaneishi (Japan) Hideshi Matsuda	Spice SE90C-Ford	D	151
14	GTP	230	Pleasure Racing	(Japan) Tetsuji Shiratori (Japan) Keiichi Mizutani (Japan) Shuji Fujii	Mazda 757	D	130
DSQ	C1	36	Toyota Team TOM'S	(Japan) Hitoshi Ogawa (Japan) Masanori Sekiya (Japan) Keiichi Suzuki	Toyota 91C-V	B	169
Ret	GTP	202	Mazdaspeed	(Japan) Takashi Yorino (Japan) Yoshimi Katayama (Republic of Ireland) Tetsuya Ota	Mazda 787B	D	22
Ret	C1	85	Team LeMans	(Japan) Takao Wada (Japan) Osamu Nakako (Brazil) Maurizio Sandro Sala	Nissan R90V	Y	14
Ret	C1	33	Takefuji Racing Team	(France) Bob Wollek (Sweden) Rickard Rydell (United Kingdom) Johnny Herbert	Porsche 962C	D	2

== Statistics ==
- Pole Position - #37 TOM'S 90C-V - 1:49.674
- Fastest Lap - #37 TOM'S 90C-V - 1:56.352
- Winner's Race Time - 5:51:40.225
