= 1989 All Japan Sports Prototype Car Endurance Championship =

Seasons
- ← 1988 1990 →

The 1989 All Japan Sports Prototype Car Endurance Championship was the seventh season of the All Japan Sports Prototype Championship. The 1989 champion was the #25 Advan Alpha Nova Porsche 962C driven by Kunimitsu Takahashi.

== Schedule ==
All races were held in Japan.

Round	Race	Circuit	Date
1	All Japan Fuji 500 km	Fuji Speedway	12 March
2	JAF Grand Prix All Japan Fuji 1000 km	Fuji Speedway	30 April
3	All Japan Fuji 500 Miles	Fuji Speedway	23 July
4^{1}	International Suzuka 1000 km	Suzuka Circuit	3 December
5	Interchallenge Fuji 1000 km	Fuji Speedway	8 October

- ^1 – Round 4 at the Suzuka Circuit was originally scheduled for 27 August; however, due to a typhoon the race was rescheduled for 3 December.

== Entry list ==
=== C/GTP ===
Team	Make	Car	Engine	No.	Drivers	Tyre	Rounds
Alpha Nova Racing (Note: No. 26 competed under Ba-Tsu ADVAN Alpha Tomei name)	Porsche	Porsche 962C	Porsche 935/82 3.0 L Twin Turbo F6	6	(Spain) Jesús Pareja	Y	5
Alpha Nova Racing	Porsche	Porsche 962C	Porsche 935/82 3.0 L Twin Turbo F6	6	(Switzerland) Walter Brun	Y	5
Alpha Nova Racing	Porsche	Porsche 962C	Porsche 935/82 3.0 L Twin Turbo F6	6	(Greece) Costas Los	Y	5
Alpha Nova Racing	Porsche	Porsche 962C	Porsche 935/82 3.0 L Twin Turbo F6	7	(Argentina) Oscar Larrauri	Y	All
Alpha Nova Racing	Porsche	Porsche 962C	Porsche 935/82 3.0 L Twin Turbo F6	7	(Brazil) Maurizio Sandro Sala	Y	All
Alpha Nova Racing	Porsche	Porsche 962C	Porsche 935/82 3.0 L Twin Turbo F6	7	(Switzerland) Walter Brun	Y	1
Alpha Nova Racing	Porsche	Porsche 962C	Porsche 935/82 3.0 L Twin Turbo F6	22	(Japan) Naoki Nagasaka	B	All
Alpha Nova Racing	Porsche	Porsche 962C	Porsche 935/82 3.0 L Twin Turbo F6	22	(Japan) Chiyomi Totani	B	All
Alpha Nova Racing	Porsche	Porsche 962C	Porsche 935/82 3.0 L Twin Turbo F6	25	(Japan) Kunimitsu Takahashi	Y	All
Alpha Nova Racing	Porsche	Porsche 962C	Porsche 935/82 3.0 L Twin Turbo F6	25	(Sweden) Stanley Dickens	Y	All
Alpha Nova Racing	Porsche	Porsche 962C	Porsche 935/82 3.0 L Twin Turbo F6	26	(Japan) Kenji Takahashi	Y	All
Alpha Nova Racing	Porsche	Porsche 962C	Porsche 935/82 3.0 L Twin Turbo F6	26	(Japan) Kazuo Mogi	Y	All
Alpha Nova Racing	Porsche	Porsche 962C	Porsche 935/82 3.0 L Twin Turbo F6	26	(Italy) Giovanni Lavaggi	Y	4–5
Joest Racing	Porsche	Porsche 962C	Porsche 935/82 3.0 L Twin Turbo F6	8	(France) Henri Pescarolo	G	5
Joest Racing	Porsche	Porsche 962C	Porsche 935/82 3.0 L Twin Turbo F6	8	(France) Jean-Louis Ricci	G	5
Joest Racing	Porsche	Porsche 962C	Porsche 935/82 3.0 L Twin Turbo F6	9	(France) Bob Wollek	G	5
Joest Racing	Porsche	Porsche 962C	Porsche 935/82 3.0 L Twin Turbo F6	9	(Germany) Frank Jelinski	G	5
Leyton House Racing	Porsche	Porsche 962C	Porsche 935/82 3.0 L Twin Turbo F6	16	(Japan) Masanori Sekiya	B	All
Leyton House Racing	Porsche	Porsche 962C	Porsche 935/82 3.0 L Twin Turbo F6	16	(Japan) Hideki Okada	B	All
Team Davey	Porsche	Porsche 962C	Porsche 935/82 3.0 L Twin Turbo F6	19	(United Kingdom) Tim Lee-Davey	D	5
Team Davey	Porsche	Porsche 962C	Porsche 935/82 3.0 L Twin Turbo F6	19	(South Africa) Desiré Wilson	D	5
Nissan Motorsports	Nissan	Nissan R88C (Rd. 1–2); Nissan R89C (Rd. 3–5)	Nissan VRH30T 3.0 L Twin Turbo V8 (Rd. 1–2); Nissan VRH35Z 3.5 L Twin Turbo V8 (Rd. 3–5)	23	(Japan) Kazuyoshi Hoshino	D B	All
Nissan Motorsports	Nissan	Nissan R88C (Rd. 1–2); Nissan R89C (Rd. 3–5)	Nissan VRH30T 3.0 L Twin Turbo V8 (Rd. 1–2); Nissan VRH35Z 3.5 L Twin Turbo V8 (Rd. 3–5)	23	(Japan) Toshio Suzuki	D B	All
Nissan Motorsports	Nissan	Nissan R88C (Rd. 1–2); Nissan R89C (Rd. 3–5)	Nissan VRH30T 3.0 L Twin Turbo V8 (Rd. 1–2); Nissan VRH35Z 3.5 L Twin Turbo V8 (Rd. 3–5)	24	(Japan) Masahiro Hasemi	D B	All
Nissan Motorsports	Nissan	Nissan R88C (Rd. 1–2); Nissan R89C (Rd. 3–5)	Nissan VRH30T 3.0 L Twin Turbo V8 (Rd. 1–2); Nissan VRH35Z 3.5 L Twin Turbo V8 (Rd. 3–5)	24	(Sweden) Anders Olofsson	D B	All
From A Racing	Porsche	Porsche 962C	Porsche 935/82 3.0 L Twin Turbo F6	27	(Japan) Akihiko Nakaya	D B	All
From A Racing	Porsche	Porsche 962C	Porsche 935/82 3.0 L Twin Turbo F6	27	(Germany) Harald Grohs	D B	All
Takefuji Racing Team	Porsche	Porsche 962C	Porsche 935/82 3.0 L Twin Turbo F6	33	(United Kingdom) Johnny Herbert	D	5
Takefuji Racing Team	Porsche	Porsche 962C	Porsche 935/82 3.0 L Twin Turbo F6	33	(United Kingdom) Martin Donnelly	D	5
Toyota Team TOM'S	Toyota	Toyota 89C-V	Toyota R32V 3.2 L Turbo V8	36	(United Kingdom) Geoff Lees	B	All
Toyota Team TOM'S	Toyota	Toyota 89C-V	Toyota R32V 3.2 L Turbo V8	36	(Japan) Hitoshi Ogawa	B	1–2, 4
Toyota Team TOM'S	Toyota	Toyota 89C-V	Toyota R32V 3.2 L Turbo V8	36	(United States) Ross Cheever	B	3–5
Toyota Team TOM'S	Toyota	Toyota 89C-V	Toyota R32V 3.2 L Turbo V8	38	(Italy) Paolo Barilla	B	3–5
Toyota Team TOM'S	Toyota	Toyota 89C-V	Toyota R32V 3.2 L Turbo V8	38	(Japan) Hitoshi Ogawa	B	3, 5
Toyota Team TOM'S	Toyota	Toyota 89C-V	Toyota R32V 3.2 L Turbo V8	38	(United Kingdom) Johnny Dumfries	B	4
Toyota Team SARD	Toyota	Toyota 89C-V	Toyota R32V 3.2 L Turbo V8	50	(Austria) Roland Ratzenberger	D	All
Toyota Team SARD	Toyota	Toyota 89C-V	Toyota R32V 3.2 L Turbo V8	50	(Japan) Keiichi Suzuki	D	All
Toyota Team SARD	Toyota	Toyota 89C-V	Toyota R32V 3.2 L Turbo V8	50	(United Kingdom) David Sears	D	1
Toyota Team SARD	Toyota	Toyota 89C-V	Toyota R32V 3.2 L Turbo V8	50	(Japan) Koji Sato	D	2
Toyota Team SARD	Toyota	Toyota 89C-V	Toyota R32V 3.2 L Turbo V8	50	(France) Jean-Pierre Jabouille	D	5
Omron Racing	Porsche	Porsche 962C	Porsche 935/83 3.0 L Twin Turbo F6	55	(Sweden) Eje Elgh	D	All
Omron Racing	Porsche	Porsche 962C	Porsche 935/83 3.0 L Twin Turbo F6	55	(Australia) Vern Schuppan	D	All
Omron Racing	Porsche	Porsche 962C	Porsche 935/83 3.0 L Twin Turbo F6	55	(Japan) Keiji Matsumoto	D	1–4
Team LeMans	March	March 88G	Nissan VG30DETT 3.0 L Twin Turbo V6	85	(Japan) Takao Wada	Y	All
Team LeMans	March	March 88G	Nissan VG30DETT 3.0 L Twin Turbo V6	85	(Japan) Akio Morimoto	Y	All
Team LeMans	March	March 88G	Nissan VG30DETT 3.0 L Twin Turbo V6	85	(Japan) Koji Sato	Y	3
British Barn Racing	British Barn Racing	British Barn BB89R	Ford DFZ 3.5 L V8	88	(Japan) Jiro Yoneyama	D	All
British Barn Racing	British Barn Racing	British Barn BB89R	Ford DFZ 3.5 L V8	88	(Japan) Kiyoshi Misaki	D	1–2, 4–5
British Barn Racing	British Barn Racing	British Barn BB89R	Ford DFZ 3.5 L V8	88	(Japan) Hideo Fukuyama	D	2–5
Trust Racing	Porsche	Porsche 962C	Porsche 935/83 3.0 L Twin Turbo F6	100	(South Africa) George Fouché	D	All
Trust Racing	Porsche	Porsche 962C	Porsche 935/83 3.0 L Twin Turbo F6	100	(Sweden) Steven Andskär	D	All
Mazdaspeed	Mazda	Mazda 767; Mazda 767B	Mazda RE13J 2.6 L 4-rotor	201	(Japan) Takashi Yorino	D	1
Mazdaspeed	Mazda	Mazda 767; Mazda 767B	Mazda RE13J 2.6 L 4-rotor	201	(Japan) Tetsuya Ota	D	1
Mazdaspeed	Mazda	Mazda 767; Mazda 767B	Mazda RE13J 2.6 L 4-rotor	201	(Japan) Yojiro Terada	D	5
Mazdaspeed	Mazda	Mazda 767; Mazda 767B	Mazda RE13J 2.6 L 4-rotor	201	(Belgium) Pierre Dieudonné	D	5
Mazdaspeed	Mazda	Mazda 767; Mazda 767B	Mazda RE13J 2.6 L 4-rotor	201	(Japan) Yoshimi Katayama	D	5
Mazdaspeed	Mazda	Mazda 767; Mazda 767B	Mazda RE13J 2.6 L 4-rotor	202	(Japan) Yoshimi Katayama	D	1–4
Mazdaspeed	Mazda	Mazda 767; Mazda 767B	Mazda RE13J 2.6 L 4-rotor	202	(Japan) Yojiro Terada	D	1–4
Mazdaspeed	Mazda	Mazda 767; Mazda 767B	Mazda RE13J 2.6 L 4-rotor	202	(Japan) Takashi Yorino	D	2–5
Mazdaspeed	Mazda	Mazda 767; Mazda 767B	Mazda RE13J 2.6 L 4-rotor	202	(Republic of Ireland) David Kennedy	D	5
Shizumatsu Racing	Mazda	Mazda 757	Mazda RE13G 2.0 L 3-rotor	230	(Japan) Tetsuji Shiratori	D	All
Shizumatsu Racing	Mazda	Mazda 757	Mazda RE13G 2.0 L 3-rotor	230	(Japan) Shuji Fujii	D	All
Shizumatsu Racing	Mazda	Mazda 757	Mazda RE13G 2.0 L 3-rotor	230	(Japan) Seisaku Suzuki	D	All
Katayama Racing	Mazda	Mazda 757	Mazda RE13G 2.0 L 3-rotor	240	(Japan) Kazuhiko Oda	D	1, 5
Katayama Racing	Mazda	Mazda 757	Mazda RE13G 2.0 L 3-rotor	240	(Japan) Toshihiko Nogami	D	1–2
Katayama Racing	Mazda	Mazda 757	Mazda RE13G 2.0 L 3-rotor	240	(Japan) Shunji Kasuya	D	2
Katayama Racing	Mazda	Mazda 757	Mazda RE13G 2.0 L 3-rotor	240	(Japan) Yoshiyuki Ogura	D	2
Katayama Racing	Mazda	Mazda 757	Mazda RE13G 2.0 L 3-rotor	240	(Japan) Keiichi Mizutani	D	5
Katayama Racing	Mazda	Mazda 757	Mazda RE13G 2.0 L 3-rotor	240	(Japan) Tomiko Yoshikawa	D	5

=== A ===
Team	Make	Car	Engine	No.	Drivers	Tyre	Rounds
Hatena Racing Team	West	West 89S	Mazda RE13B 1.3 L 2-rotor	5	(Japan) Zenkichi Maruko	Y	4
Hatena Racing Team	West	West 89S	Mazda RE13B 1.3 L 2-rotor	5	(Japan) Ryosuke Nozaki	Y	4
Hatena Racing Team	West	West 89S	Mazda RE13B 1.3 L 2-rotor	5	(Japan) Masami Miyoshi	Y	4
Yoshifumi Yamazaki	West	West 89S	Mazda RE13B 1.3 L 2-rotor	8	(Japan) Yoshifumi Yamazaki	Y	4
Yoshifumi Yamazaki	West	West 89S	Mazda RE13B 1.3 L 2-rotor	8	(Japan) Masaki Ohashi	Y	4
Yoshifumi Yamazaki	West	West 89S	Mazda RE13B 1.3 L 2-rotor	8	(Japan) Naoto Chikada	Y	4
Moditt Racing Team	West	West 89S	Mazda RE13B 1.3 L 2-rotor	17	(Japan) Ryuichi Natsukawa	D	4
Moditt Racing Team	West	West 89S	Mazda RE13B 1.3 L 2-rotor	17	(Japan) Junichi Ikura	D	4
Moditt Racing Team	West	West 89S	Mazda RE13B 1.3 L 2-rotor	17	(Japan) Naoki Hattori	D	4
Keiichi Mizutani	West	West 89S	Mazda RE13B 1.3 L 2-rotor	21	(Japan) Keiichi Mizutani	D	4
Keiichi Mizutani	West	West 89S	Mazda RE13B 1.3 L 2-rotor	21	(Japan) Kenichi Kaneko	D	4
Keiichi Mizutani	West	West 89S	Mazda RE13B 1.3 L 2-rotor	21	(Japan) Masaki Furuhashi	D	4
Something Good Racing Team	West	West 87S	Mazda RE13B 1.3 L 2-rotor	56	(Japan) Keiichi Sakamoto	D	4
Something Good Racing Team	West	West 87S	Mazda RE13B 1.3 L 2-rotor	56	(Japan) Eiichi Tajima	D	4
Something Good Racing Team	West	West 87S	Mazda RE13B 1.3 L 2-rotor	56	(Japan) Tomoyuki Hosono	D	4
Joy Sport	Oscar	Oscar SK90	Mazda RE13B 1.3 L 2-rotor	67	(Japan) Tsuguaki Ogura	D	4
Joy Sport	Oscar	Oscar SK90	Mazda RE13B 1.3 L 2-rotor	67	(Japan) Yoshiyuki Ogura	D	4
Joy Sport	Oscar	Oscar SK90	Mazda RE13B 1.3 L 2-rotor	67	(Japan) Hiromi Nishizawa	D	4
Yoichiro Suzuki	West	West 87S	Mazda RE13B 1.3 L 2-rotor	73	(Japan) Yoichiro Suzuki	D	4
Yoichiro Suzuki	West	West 87S	Mazda RE13B 1.3 L 2-rotor	73	(Japan) Toshihiko Mochizuki	D	4
Yoichiro Suzuki	West	West 87S	Mazda RE13B 1.3 L 2-rotor	73	(Japan) Hajime Oshiro	D	4
Susai Racing Magic	Oscar	Oscar SK90	Mazda RE13B 1.3 L 2-rotor	77	(Japan) Yasuhiro Susai	D	4
Susai Racing Magic	Oscar	Oscar SK90	Mazda RE13B 1.3 L 2-rotor	77	(Japan) Hiroshi Yonetani	D	4
Susai Racing Magic	Oscar	Oscar SK90	Mazda RE13B 1.3 L 2-rotor	77	(Japan) Hidetoshi Okamoto	D	4
Team Jikanwari	Oscar	Oscar SK85	Mazda RE13B 1.3 L 2-rotor	99	(Japan) Michiko Hashimoto	Y	4
Team Jikanwari	Oscar	Oscar SK85	Mazda RE13B 1.3 L 2-rotor	99	(Japan) Soichiro Tanaka	Y	4
Team Jikanwari	Oscar	Oscar SK85	Mazda RE13B 1.3 L 2-rotor	99	(Japan) Hiroaki Ishii	Y	4

== Season results ==
Season results as follows:

Round	Circuit	Winning team
Round	Circuit	Winning drivers
1	Mt. Fuji	#27 From A Racing Porsche 962C
1	Mt. Fuji	(Germany) Harald Grohs (Japan) Akihiko Nakaya
2	Mt. Fuji; Report	#55 Omron Racing Porsche 962C
2	Mt. Fuji; Report	(Australia) Vern Schuppan (Sweden) Eje Elgh (Japan) Keiji Matsumoto
3	Mt. Fuji	#16 Leyton House Racing Porsche 962C
3	Mt. Fuji	(Japan) Hideki Okada (Japan) Masanori Sekiya
4	Suzuka Circuit; Report	#25 Alpha Nova Porsche 962C
4	Suzuka Circuit; Report	(Japan) Kunimitsu Takahashi (Sweden) Stanley Dickens
5	Mt. Fuji	#38 Toyota Team TOM'S Toyota 89C-V
5	Mt. Fuji	(Japan) Hitoshi Ogawa (Italy) Paolo Barilla

== Point Ranking ==
=== Drivers ===
Rank	Drivers	Number/Team	Points	Wins	Distance
1	(Japan) Kunimitsu Takahashi	#25 Alpha Nova Porsche 962C	56	1	2077.617 km
2	(Sweden) Stanley Dickens	#25 Alpha Nova Porsche 962C	56	1	1794.012 km
3	(United Kingdom) Geoff Lees	#36 Toyota Team TOM'S Toyota 89C-V	55	0	1945.209 km
4	(Sweden) Steven Andskär	#100 Trust Racing Porsche 962C	55	0	1379.514 km
5	(Sweden) Eje Elgh	#55 Omron Racing Porsche 962C	47	1	1215.84 km
6	(Australia) Vern Schuppan	#55 Omron Racing Porsche 962C	47	1	701.79 km

=== Makes ===
Rank	Make	Points	Wins
1	Porsche	95	4
2	Toyota	43	1
3	Nissan	24	0
4	March-Nissan	18	0
5	Mazda	18	0
6	TOM'S-British Barn-Ford	3	0
