= 1991 Long Distance Series season =

1991 Fuji Long Distance Series

Seasons
- ← 1990 1992 →

The 1991 Long Distance Series was the 15th season of this series, with half the races being held at the Fuji International Speedway. This is the first season where races were held away from Fuji, hence the dropping of “Fuji” from the title.

== Long Distance ==
=== Results ===
| Date | Round | | Circuit | Winning drivers | Winning team | Winning car |
|---|---|---|---|---|---|---|
| 10/03/91 | Rd.1 | All Japan Fuji 500km | Fuji | (Japan) Kazuyoshi Hoshino (Japan) Toshio Suzuki | (Japan) Nissan Motorsport | Nissan R91CP |
| 05/05/91 | Rd.2 | All Japan Fuji 1000km | Fuji | (Japan) Kazuyoshi Hoshino (Japan) Toshio Suzuki | (Japan) Nissan Motorsport | Nissan R91CP |
| 21/07/91 | Rd.3 | All Japan Fuji 500 miles | Fuji | (Japan) Hitoshi Ogawa (Japan) Masanori Sekiya | (Japan) Toyota Team TOM’S | Toyota 91C-V |
| 25/08/91 | Rd.4 | International Suzuka 1000km | Suzuka | (Austria) Roland Ratzenberger (France) Pierre-Henri Raphanel (Japan) Naoki Nagasaka | (Japan) Toyota Team SARD | Toyota 91C-V |
| 15/09/91 | Rd.5 | SUGO Inter 500km | Sugo | (Sweden) Eje Elgh (United Kingdom) Geoff Lees | (Japan) Toyota Team TOM’S | Toyota 91C-V |
| 06/10/91 | Rd.6 | Interchallenge Fuji 1000km | Fuji | (Japan) Kazuyoshi Hoshino (Japan) Toshio Suzuki | (Japan) Nissan Motorsport | Nissan R91CP |
| 03/11/91 | Rd.7 | SUGO Inter 500 miles | Sugo | (Italy) Teo Fabi (Australia) David Brabham | (United Kingdom) TWR Suntec Jaguar | Jaguar XJR-14 |
