= 1991 Suzuka 1000km =

1991 1000 km Suzuka

Seasons
- ← 1990 1992 →

Layout of the Suzuka International Racing Course (1987-2002)

The 1991 Suzuka 1000 km was the fourth round of the 1991 All Japan Sports Prototype Car Endurance Championship season and the 20th running of the 1000 km Suzuka. It took place at Suzuka Circuit, Japan on August 25, 1991.

== Race results ==
Results are as follows:

Pos	Class	No	Team	Drivers	Chassis	Tyre	Laps
1	C1	38	Toyota Team SARD	(Austria) Roland Ratzenberger (France) Pierre-Henri Raphanel (Japan) Naoki Nagasaka	Toyota 91C-V	D	171
2	C1	27	From A Racing	(Germany) Volker Weidler (Japan) Akihiko Nakaya	Nissan R91CK	B	171
3	C1	1	Nissan Motorsport	(Japan) Masahiro Hasemi (Sweden) Anders Olofsson	Nissan R91CP	B	167
4	C1	36	TOM'S	(Japan) Hitoshi Ogawa (Japan) Masanori Sekiya (United Kingdom) Andy Wallace	Toyota 91C-V	B	166
5	C1	100	Trust Racing	(South Africa) George Fouche (Sweden) Steven Andskar	Porsche 962C	D	166
6	GTP	201	Mazdaspeed	(Japan) Takashi Yorino (Japan) Yojiro Terada (Republic of Ireland) David Kennedy	Mazda 787B	D	165
7	GTP	230	Pleasure Racing	(Japan) Tetsuji Shiratori (Japan) Masatomo Shimizu (Japan) Shuji Fujii	Mazda 767	D	147
DNF	C1	23	Nissan Motorsport	(Japan) Kazuyoshi Hoshino (Japan) Toshio Suzuki	Nissan R91CP	B	162
DNF	C1	25	Team LeMans	(Japan) Hideki Okada (Brazil) Maurizio Sandro Sala (Japan) Takao Wada	Nissan R90CP	Y	68
DNF	C1	91	Team 0123	(United Kingdom) Julian Bailey (United Kingdom) Kenny Acheson	Porsche 962C	D	54
DNF	C1	18	TWR Suntech	(Denmark) John Nielsen (Italy) Mauro Martini (United States) Jeff Krosnoff	Jaguar XJR-11	G	46
DNF	C1	37	Toyota Team TOM'S	(United Kingdom) Geoff Lees (Sweden) Eje Elgh (United Kingdom) Andy Wallace	Toyota 91C-V	B	34

== Statistics ==
- Pole Position – #37 TOM'S 92C-V – 1:47.376
- Fastest Lap – #36 TOM'S 91C-V – 1:53.755
- Winner's Race Time – 5:44:52.513
