= 1991 Fuji 1000km =

Endurance racing event in Japan (1991)

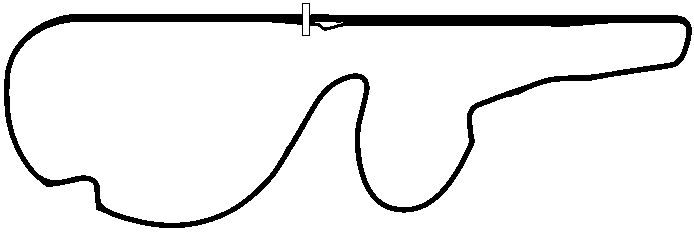
Layout of the Fuji Speedway (1987–2003)

The 1991 Fuji 1000 km was the second round of the 1991 All Japan Sports Prototype Car Endurance Championship season. It took place at Fuji Speedway, Japan on May 5, 1991.

== Race results ==
Results are as follows:

Pos	Class	No	Team	Drivers	Chassis	Tyre	Laps
1	C1	23	Nissan Motorsport	(Japan) Kazuyoshi Hoshino (Japan) Toshio Suzuki	Nissan R91CP	B	224
2	C1	1	Nissan Motorsport	(Japan) Masahiro Hasemi (Sweden) Anders Olofsson	Nissan R91CP	B	224
3	C1	36	TOM'S	(Japan) Hitoshi Ogawa (Japan) Masanori Sekiya (United Kingdom) Andy Wallace	Toyota 91C-V	B	223
4	C1	100	Trust Racing	(South Africa) George Fouche (Sweden) Steven Andskar	Porsche 962C	D	223
5	C1	37	Toyota Team TOM'S	(United Kingdom) Geoff Lees (Sweden) Eje Elgh (France) Pierre-Henri Raphanel	Toyota 90C-V	B	222
6	GTP	202	Mazdaspeed	(Japan) Takashi Yorino (Japan) Yojiro Terada	Mazda 787B	D	222
7	C1	7	The Alpha Racing	(United Kingdom) Tiff Needell (France) Bob Wollek	Porsche 962C	Y	218
8	C1	38	Toyota Team SARD	(Austria) Roland Ratzenberger (Japan) Naoki Nagasaka	Toyota 91C-V	D	216
9	GTP	201	Mazdaspeed	(Japan) Tetsuya Ota (Republic of Ireland) David Kennedy	Mazda 787B	D	191
10	GTP	230	Pleasure Racing	(Japan) Tetsuji Shiratori (Japan) Masatomo Shimizu (Japan) Shuji Fujii	Mazda 767	D	179
DNF	C1	2	Team Taisan	(United Kingdom) Will Hoy (Sweden) Stanley Dickens (Japan) Kunimitsu Takahashi	Porsche 962C	Y	151
DNF	C1	77	Team Fedco	(Japan) Kiyoshi Misaki (Japan) Hisashi Yokoshima	Spice SE90C-Ford	G	137
DNF	C1	27	From A Racing	(Germany) Volker Weidler (Japan) Akihiko Nakaya (Sweden) Thomas Danielsson	Nissan R91CK	B	103
DNF	C1	18	TWR Suntech	(Italy) Mauro Martini (United States) Jeff Krosnoff	Jaguar XJR-11	G	83
DNF	C1	25	Team LeMans	(Japan) Hideki Okada (Japan) Takao Wada	Nissan R90CP	Y	81

== Statistics ==
- Pole Position – #1 Nissan R91CP – 1:15.188
- Winner's Race Time – 5:28:38.962
