= 1991 Sugo 500km =

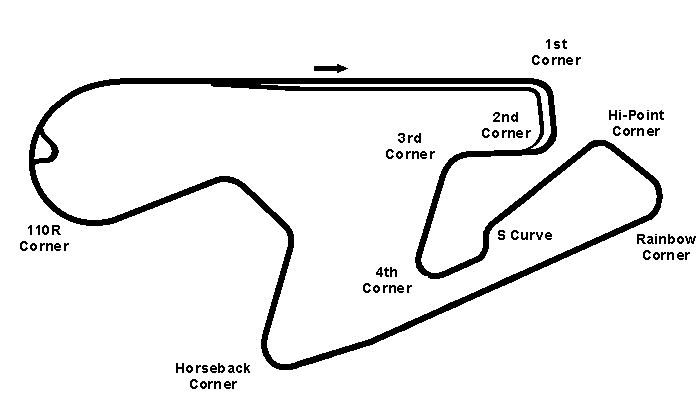
Layout of the Sugo

The Sugo Inter 500 km, was the fifth round of both the 1991 All Japan Sports Prototype Championship and the 1991 Long Distance Series, held at the Sugo on 15 September, in front of a crowd of approximately 45,000.

== Report ==
=== Entry ===
A total of 14 cars were entered for the event, in two classes, one for cars running to Group C1 specification and the other to IMSA GTP regulations.

=== Qualifying ===
The Nisseki Racing Team of George Fouché and Steven Andskär took pole position, in their Porsche 962GTi ahead of the Toyota Team SARD's Toyota 91C-V of Roland Ratzenberger and Pierre-Henri Raphanel, by only 0.047secs.

=== Race ===
The race was held over 135 laps of the Sportsland Sugo circuit, a distance of 500 km (actual distance was 500.075 km). Eje Elgh and Geoff Lees took the winner spoils for the Toyota Team Tom's, driving their Toyota 91C-V. The European duo won in a time of 2hr 57:30.838mins., averaging a speed of 105.641 mph. Second place went to Akihiko Nakaya and Volker Weidler in the From A Racing's Nissan R91CK who finished about 6.5 seconds adrift. Also on the lead lap, in third place was the Nissan Motorsport of Anders Olofsson and Masahiro Hasemi.

== Classification ==
=== Result ===
Class Winners are in Bold text.

Pos.	No.	Class	Drivers			Entrant	Car — Engine	Time, Laps	Reason Out
1st	**37**	**C1**	**(Sweden) Eje Elgh**	**(United Kingdom) Geoff Lees**		**Toyota Team Tom's**	**Toyota 91C-V**	2:57:30.838	
2nd	27	C1	(Japan) Akihiko Nakaya	(Germany) Volker Weidler		From A Racing	Nissan R91CK	2:57:37.020	
3rd	1	C1	(Japan) Masahiro Hasemi	(Sweden) Anders Olofsson		Nissan Motorsport	Nissan R91CP	2:58:55.982	
4th	100	C1	(South Africa) George Fouché	(Sweden) Steven Andskär		Nisseki Racing Team	Porsche 962GTi	132	
5th	25	C1	(Japan) Hideki Okada	(Japan) Masahiko Kageyama		Team Le Mans	Nissam R90VP	132	
6th	18	C1	(Italy) Mauro Martini	(United States) Jeff Krosnoff		TWR Suntec Jaguar	Jaguar XJR-11	129	
7th	38	C1	(Austria) Roland Ratzenberger	(France) Pierre-Henri Raphanel		Toyota Team SARD	Toyota 91C-V	127	
8th	21	C1	(Japan) Hideo Fukuyama	(Japan) Hideshi Matsuda		Aoshima Tsunemasa	Spice-Ford SE90C	127	
9th	**202**	**GTP**	**(Japan) Tetsuya Ota**	**(Japan) Takashi Yorino**		**Mazdaspeed**	**Mazda 787B**	126	
10th	36	C1	(Japan) Masanori Sekiya	(Japan) Hitoshi Ogawa		Toyota Team Tom's	Toyota 91C-V	126	
11th	119	C1	(Japan) Kazuyoshi Hoshino	(Japan) Toshio Suzuki		Nissan Motorsport	Nissan R91CP	119	
DNF	201	GTP	(Republic of Ireland) David Kennedy	(Japan) Yojiro Terada		Mazdaspeed	Mazda 787B	23	Course Out
DNF	230	GTP	(Japan) Tetsuji Shiratori	(Japan) Masatomo Shimizu	(Japan) Syuuji Fujii	Pleasure Racing	Mazda 767	3	Differential
DNQ	3	C1	(Japan) Taku Akaike	(Japan) Karou Iida		Navi Connection Racing	Mazda-Ford 767B		

- Fastest lap: Masanori Sekiya/Hitoshi Ogawa, 1:14.593secs. (111.74 mph)
