= Tomiko Yoshikawa =

Japanese racing driver

Tomiko Yoshikawa (吉川とみ子, Yoshikawa Tomiko; born 10 May 1954) is a Japanese racing driver who competed in junior open-wheel racing and sports car categories. She entered the 24 Hours of Le Mans four times, the 24 Hours of Daytona once and also raced in her native Japan in such series as the All-Japan Formula Three Championship and the Fuji Grand Champion Series. In 1991 she was part of the first all-female LeMans driving team, driving with Lyn St. James and Desiré Wilson.

== Biography ==
Yoshikawa was born in Nagoya, Aichi Prefecture, Japan on 10 May 1954; her family owned a fruit and vegetable shop. She played softball until she became frustrated with her pitching methodology and is a high school dropout. Aged 20, Yoshikawa received an invitation from the brother-in-law of a motor racing driver to participate in an amateur event at the Suzuka Circuit in Mie Prefecture and went on to visit the track every weekend.

Yoshikawa obtained domestic Class A license in 1977 and she began her full-time racing career two years later. In 1980, Yoshikawa began racing in open-wheel racing cars. She participated in the All-Japan Formula Three Championship, driving an Oscar T1-Toyota car in one race and finishing the season 20th overall with a single point scored during the 1980 Japanese Formula 3 Championship. Yoshikawa did one race in 1981 at Suzuka (part of the 1981 Japanese Formula 3 Championship) and finished 16th in a Team Equip-fielded Oscar T3B-Toyota vehicle and went unclassified in that year's points standings. The following year, she finished 16th in the 1982 Japanese Formula 3 Championship with five points scored over six races that she entered driving a March 783-Toyota car. Yoshikawa achieved a career-high finish in the series with tenth place and eight points acculmated in the 1983 Japanese Formula 3 Championship over four races in a Hayashi 320-Toyota entry. Her final season in the series was the 1984 Japanese Formula 3 Championship and she again drove a Hayashi 320-Toyota, finishing 11th overall with 21 points.

During 1985 and 1986, Yoshkiawa entered three endurance sports car races that formed the Fuji Grand Champion Series in a MCS 5-BMW that was fielded by Maribu Motorsport. She placed 16th in the Fuji 300 km, 19th in the Fuji 250 km, failed to start the Fuji 200 Mile due to an accident and retired from the Fuji GC (Grand Champion) after a major crash during the practice session. She had become the first woman to participate in the GC Fuji event. Yoshikawa did not finish the 1988 Suzuka 1000km (part of the All Japan Sports Prototype Championship in a Hiro HRS3-Mazda car she shared with fellow Japanese Kouzou Okumura due to an accident. She entered but was not classified for the 1989 Fuji 1000km that she partook in Katayama Racing's GTP-class Mazda 757 shared with fellow Japanese Keiichi Mizutani and Kazuhiko Oda. In 1991, Yoshikawa raced both the 1991 Sugo 500km and the 1991 Fuji 1000km in a Spice SE90C with Hideo Fukuyama and Hideshi Matsuda, finishing eighth overall (first in the C1 category) and retiring, respectively. That year, she joined with Lyn St. James and Desiré Wilson to establish the first all-female team at LeMans.

In 1992, Yoshikawa became the first Japanese women to race at the 24 Hours of Le Mans by obtaining a FIA Super S license, and she received media coverage in Japan as a result. Driving a Category 1-category Chamberlain Engineering Spice SE89C-Ford Cosworth with Jun Harada and Kenta Shimamura, Yoshikawa and her co-drivers were classified 15th overall and eighth in class. That same year, she, Divina Galica and Harada came seventh overall at the 1992 1000 km of Suzuka (part of the World Sportscar Championship). Yoshikawa went on to race the 1993 24 Hours of Daytona for the Tom Gloy Racing team. Sharing a Ford Mustang with Canadians Pieter Baljet and Ron Fellows as well as South Africa's Desiré Wilson, she placed 47th following a crash. She then failed to finish the 1993 24 Hours of Le Mans in Courage Compétition's C30LM-Porsche entry alongside Alessandro Gini and Carlos Moran due to an tyre failure that caused an accident. Yoshikawa, Gordon Kellett and Matsuda retired from the Suzuka 1000 km due to their Lotus Esprit Sport 300 overheating.

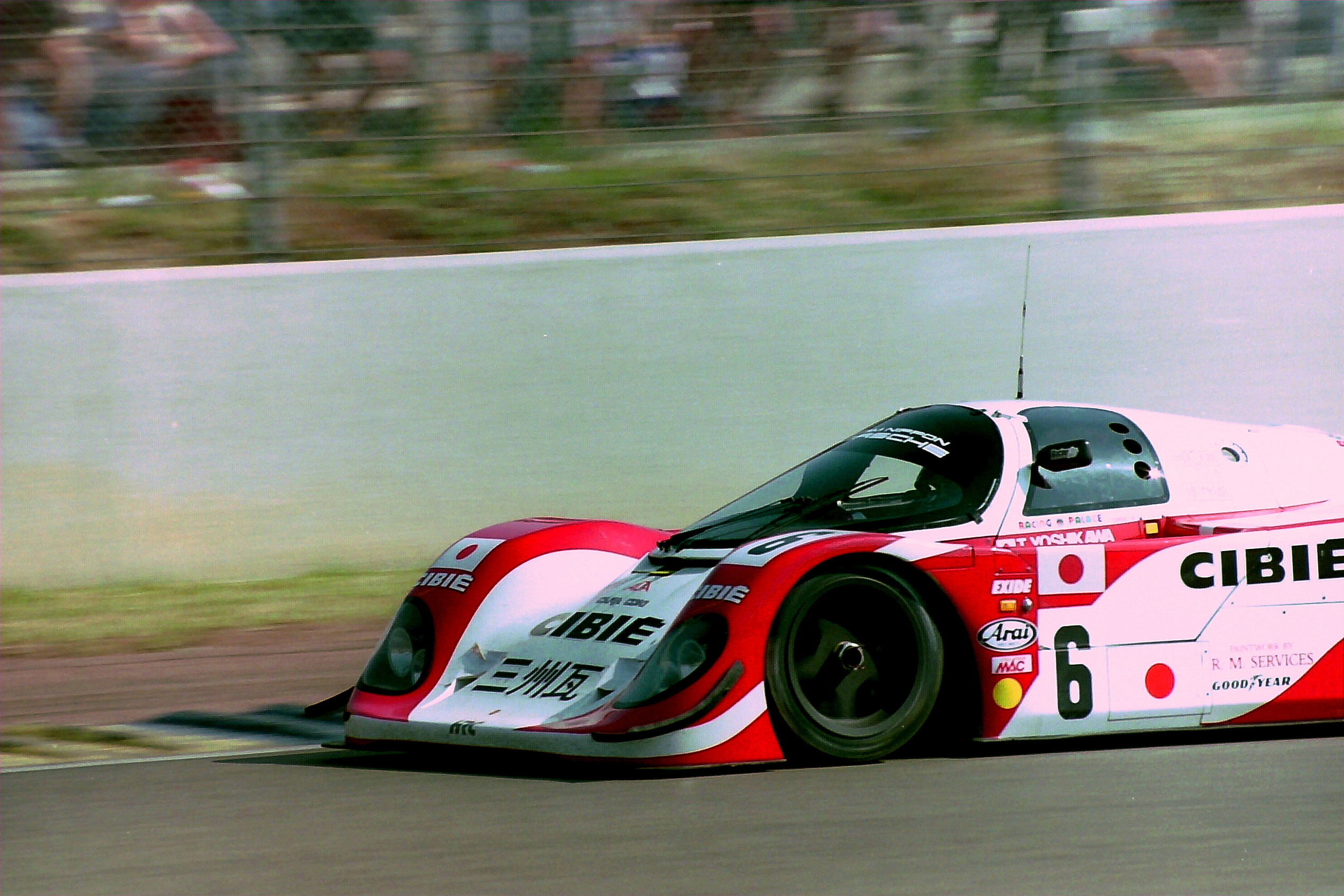
Jun Harada, Tomiko Yoshikawa, and Masahiko Kondou at the 1994 Le Mans in a Porsche 962C.

At the 1994 24 Hours of Le Mans, Yoshikawa, Hurada and Masahiko Kondō did not reach enough distance to be classified in their LMP1/C90-category ADA Team Nippon-entered Porsche 962C GTi. Yoshikawa, Luciano Della Noce and Anders Olofsson's Strandell Motorsport Ferrari F40 was disqualified from the 1994 Suzuka 1000 km due to an illegal overtake. Her final appearance at Le Mans came in 1995 when she, Kenny Acheson and Alain Ferté's LMGT1-category SARD-entered SARD MC8-R-Toyota failed due to clutch trouble. Yoshikawa spent the following ten years racing solely in Japan without much success. She became a motorsport advisor to Bridgestone and cared for stray cats in a rented home.

== Career results ==
=== Complete 24 Hours of Le Mans results ===
Year	Team	Co-Drivers	Car	Class	Laps	Pos.	Class Pos.
1992	(United Kingdom) Chamberlain Engineering	(Japan) Jun Harada (Japan) Kenta Shimamura	Spice SE89C-Ford Cosworth	C1	160	NC	NC
1993	(France) Courage Compétition	(Italy) Alessandro Gini (Spain) Carlos Moran	Courage C30LM-Porsche	C2	108	DNF	DNF
1994	(Japan) ADA Team Nippon	(Japan) Jun Harada (Japan) Masahiko Kondō	Porsche 962C GTi	LMP1/C90	189	NC	NC
1995	(Japan) Sard Co. Ltd	(United Kingdom) Kenny Acheson (France) Alain Ferté	Sard MC8-R-Toyota	LMGT1	14	DNF	DNF
