= Toyota R32V/R36V engine =

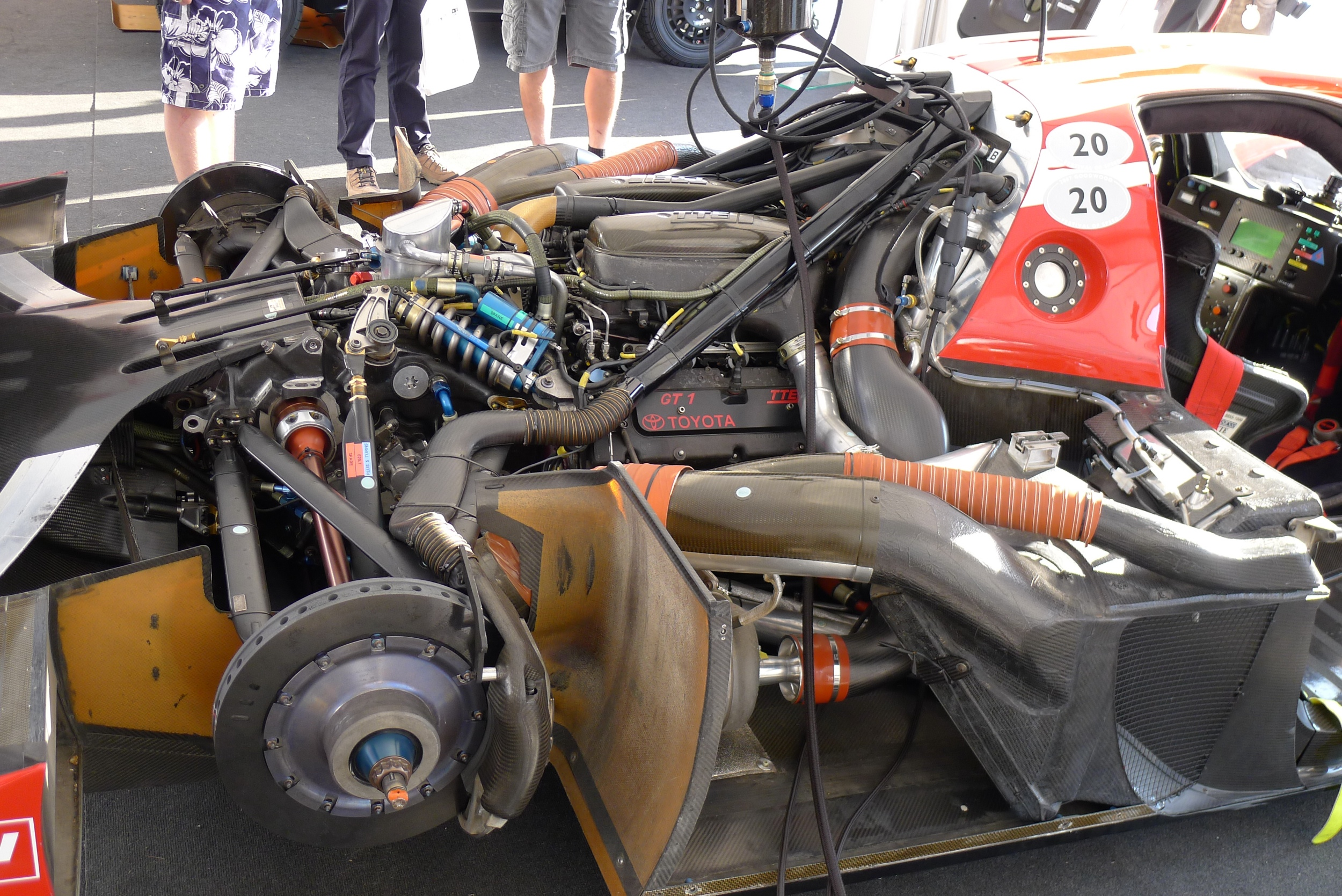

Overview
- Manufacturer: (Japan) Toyota
- Production: 1988–1999

Layout
- Configuration: 90° V8
- Displacement: 3.2 L (3,169 cc); 3.6 L (3,578 cc)
- Cylinder bore: 82 mm (3.23 in); 86 mm (3.39 in)
- Piston stroke: 75 mm (2.95 in); 77 mm (3.03 in)
- Valvetrain: DOHC, 32-valve (four-valves per cylinder)

Combustion
- Turbocharger: Twin-turbocharged
- Fuel system: Electronic fuel injection
- Fuel type: Gasoline
- Oil system: Dry sump
- Cooling system: Water-cooled

Output
- Power output: 590–1,000 hp (440–746 kW; 598–1,014 PS)
- Torque output: 479–660 lb⋅ft (649–895 N⋅m)

Chronology
- Predecessor: Toyota RV10 engine
- Successor: Toyota RV8 engine

The Toyota R32V and R36V engine family are a series of turbocharged 3.2- and 3.6-liter, 90-degree, four-stroke, V-8 gasoline racing engines designed, developed and produced by Toyota for sports car racing between 1988 and 1999. The engines were used in various Toyota sports prototype race cars.

== Applications ==
- Toyota 88C-V
- Toyota 89C-V
- Toyota 90C-V
- Toyota 91C-V
- Toyota 92C-V
- Toyota 93C-V
- Toyota 94C-V
- Toyota GT-One
