= All-Japan Sports Prototype Championship =

Auto racing series in Japan

- Category: Sportscar
- Country: Japan
- Inaugural season: 1983
- Folded: 1992

The All Japan Sports Prototype Championship (全日本スポーツプロトタイプ選手権), abbreviated as JSPC, formed by the Japan Automobile Federation, was a domestic championship which took place in Japan for Group C and IMSA GTP prototype cars and also featured cars that were eligible for touring car racing in its earlier years. Class A and Class B for production cars which were defined by the FIA (Group A and Group B) and the lead category, Class C would be for cars that are similar to IMSA's Camel Lights and the WEC's C2, whereas Class D was for C1/GTP cars.

The series began in 1983 as All Japan Endurance Championship, an endurance championship with an intention to replace its domestic touring car championship and started out as a three-round event, including one which as it was part of the WEC round which meant drivers competing in the national series was counted into the world championship. In 1987, the championship would be broken up into two as production cars from the lower categories would be moved into the All Japan Touring Car Championship (now Super GT) formed two years earlier to become a dedicated championship and was renamed the All Japan Sports Prototype Car Endurance Championship.

The series was noted throughout its ten-year run for battles between the various Porsche 956/962C and Japanese manufacturers presented by works teams of Toyota, Nissan and Mazda. Due to waning popularity and seeking to prevent the spiraling budgets and the disappearance of Gr. C and IMSA GTP, the JAF would dissolve the series at the end of 1992 and for the following year replace the series with the All Japan Grand Touring Car Championship, using GT cars such as those in secondary classes as major international sportscar series worldwide favoured the grand tourers (similar to IMSA's lower GTS and GTU classes). This was not to be the end for Group C cars as they would be allowed to compete in the newly formed series for two more years before being banished altogether.

Major sportscar racing in Japan would return again in 2006 with the short-lived Japan Le Mans Challenge.

== Champions ==
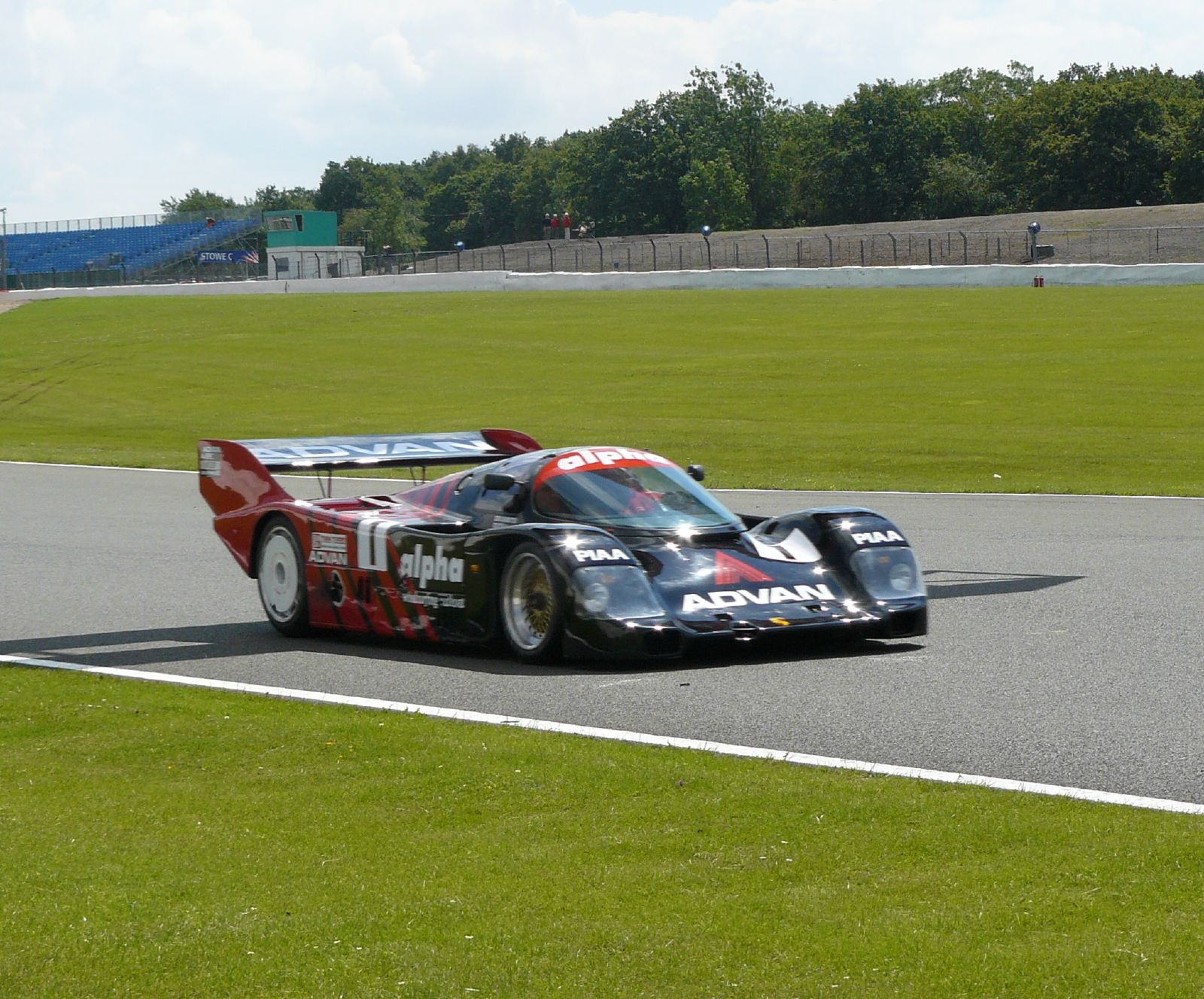
The Yokohama Advan Porsche 962C which won the championship three times.

	Winning Driver(s)	
Winning Manufacturer
1983	(Australia) Vern Schuppan	
1983	(Germany) Porsche	
1984	(Japan) Naoki Nagasaka	
1984	(Germany) Lotec-BMW	
1985	(Japan) Kunimitsu Takahashi	
1985	(Germany) Porsche	
1986	(Japan) Kunimitsu Takahashi	
1986	(Germany) Porsche	
1987	(Japan) Kunimitsu Takahashi	
1987	(Germany) Porsche	
1988	(Japan) Hideki Okada	
1988	(Germany) Porsche	
1989	(Japan) Kunimitsu Takahashi	
1989	(Germany) Porsche	
1990	(Japan) Masahiro Hasemi	
1990	(Japan) Nissan	
1991	(Japan) Kazuyoshi Hoshino	
1991	(Japan) Nissan	
1992	C Class	C1 Class
1992	(United Kingdom) Geoff Lees	(Japan) Kazuyoshi Hoshino
1992	(Japan) Toyota	(Japan) Nissan
