= Toyota 90C-V =

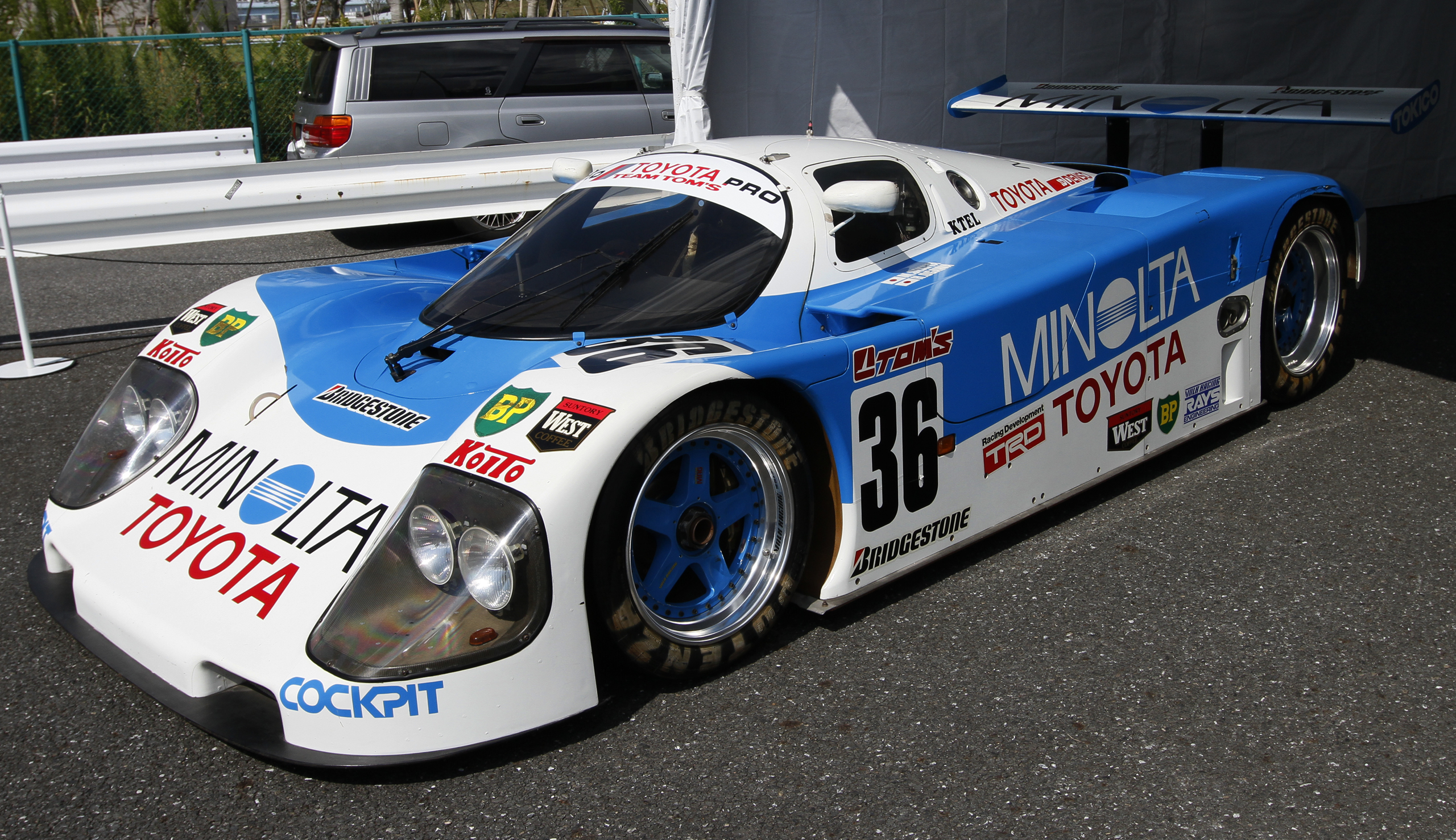
- Category: Group C1
- Constructor: Toyota

Technical specifications
- Chassis: Carbon fiber monocoque
- Length: 4670 mm
- Width: 1990 mm
- Height: 1000 mm
- Engine: Toyota R32V and R36V; 3.2 liter or 3.6 liter V8 Twin-turbo
- Transmission: 5-speed manual
- Tyres: Bridgestone; Dunlop

Competition history
- Notable entrants: Toyota Team TOM's; Toyota Team SARD
- Notable drivers: (United Kingdom) Geoff Lees (Japan) Hitoshi Ogawa (United Kingdom) Johnny Dumfries (France) Pierre-Henri Raphanel (Austria) Roland Ratzenberger
- Debut: 1990 500 km of Fuji
- Last season: 1991
Races	Wins	Poles
18	1	4
- Constructors' Championships: 0
- Drivers' Championships: 0

The Toyota 90C-V was a racing car built by Toyota, developed as a Group C1 car. It took part in the All Japan Sports Prototype Championship, the World Sportscar Championship, and at the 24 Hours of Le Mans.

== All Japan Sports Prototype Championship ==
The 90C-V raced in the 1990 All Japan Sports Prototype Championship (JSPC). It raced alongside the 89C-V for the first two races at Fuji. The 90C-V achieved its only victory at its debut race at the Fuji 500 km. The car achieved moderate results for the remainder of the season, finishing in the top 10 in most races.

The 90C-V also took part in the first two races of the 1991 season. It finished third and fifth in those races, before it was replaced by the 91C-V for the remainder of the season.

== World Sportscar Championship ==
The 90C-V participated in the 1990 World Sportscar Championship season. It did not produce the same results as it had in the JSPC. Its best finish came at season opener, where it finished fourth at the 480 km of Suzuka. However, it finished outside the top 10 in every other race.

== 24 Hours of Le Mans ==
Toyota entered three cars into the 1990 24 Hours of Le Mans, with the numbers #36, #37, and #38. The best in qualifying of the three cars was the #36 car driven by Geoff Lees, which qualified 10th for the race. The #37 and #38 cars managed 14th and 16th in qualifying, respectively.

The #37 car retired about four hours into the race due to an accident, with Aguri Suzuki driving at the time. Then, during the 18th hour, the #38 car suffered an engine failure, leaving the #36 car the only 90C-V still in the race. It eventually finished in sixth position (both overall, and in class), 12 laps behind the leader.
