= Stanley Dickens =

Swedish racing driver

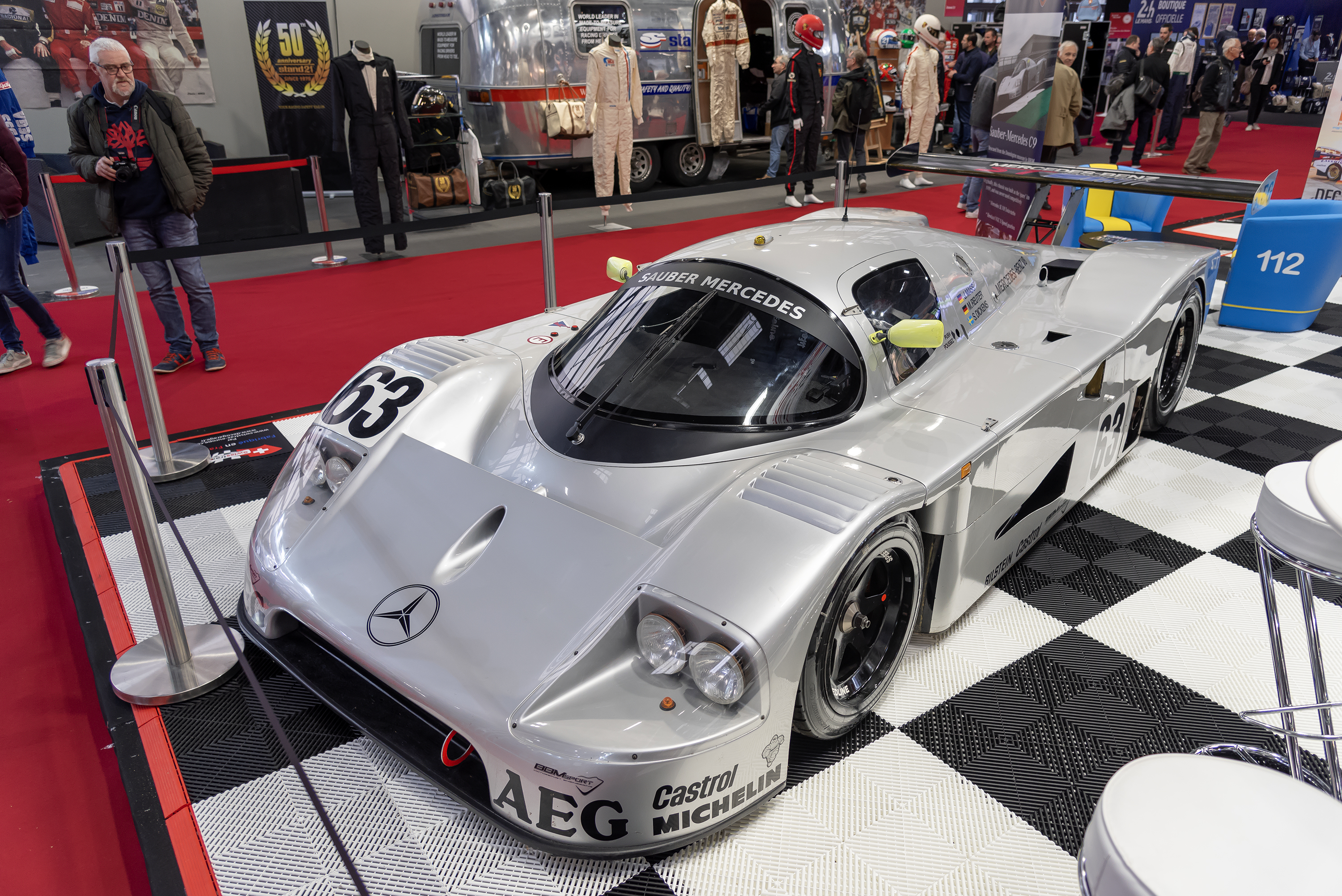
- Dickens' 1989 24 Hours of Le Mans–winning Sauber Mercedes C9.
- Nationality: (Sweden) Swedish
- Born: 7 May 1952 (age 74) Färila, Sweden

24 Hours of Le Mans career
- Years: 1986 – 1991, 1996
- Teams: Gebhardt Motorsport; Joest Racing; Team Sauber Mercedes; Kremer Racing
- Best finish: 1st (1989)
- Class wins: 1 (1985)

Stanley Dickens (born 7 May 1952) is a Swedish racing driver who won the Le Mans 24 hours in 1989 driving a Sauber C9-Mercedes. He was born in Färila.

== Notable results ==
- 1000 km of Suzuka: 1st,1989
- 500 km of Fuji: 1st,1988, 2nd,1986, 3e,1990
- 500 km of Mid-Ohio: 3e,1989
- Interserie Nürburgring: 1st (class win),1984
- 200 mile of Norisring: 3e:1987,
- 1000 km of Spa Franchorchamps: 2nd, (class) 1985,

== Complete 24 Hours of Le Mans results ==
Year	Team	Co-drivers	Car	Class	Laps	Pos.	Class pos.
1986	(Germany) Gebhardt Motorsport	(France) Pierre de Thoisy (France) Jean-François Yvon	Gebhardt JC853	C2	68	DNF	DNF
1987	(Germany) Joest Racing	(United States) Hurley Haywood (Germany) Frank Jelinski (South Africa) Sarel van der Merwe	Porche 962C	C1	7	DNF	DNF
1988	(Germany) Blaupunkt Joest Racing	(Germany) Frank Jelinski (Germany) Louis Krages	Porsche 962C	C1	385	3rd	3rd
1989	(Germany) Team Sauber Mercedes	(Germany) Jochen Mass (Germany) Manuel Reuter	Sauber Mercedes C9	C1	389	1st	1st
1990	(Germany) Joest Porsche Racing	(Germany) Louis Krages (France) Bob Wollek	Porsche 962C	C1	346	8th	8th
1991	(Germany) Team Sauber Mercedes	(United Kingdom) Jonathan Palmer (Denmark) Kurt Thiim	Mercedes-Benz C11	C2	223	DNF	DNF
1996	(Germany) Kremer Racing	(United States) Steve Fossett (South Africa) George Fouché	Kremer K8 Spyder	LMP1	58	DNF	DNF

Sporting positions
Preceded by Jan Lammers; Johnny Dumfries; Andy Wallace	Winner of the 24 Hours of Le Mans; 1989 with: Jochen Mass; Manuel Reuter	Succeeded by John Nielsen; Price Cobb; Martin Brundle
