= Toyota 91C-V =

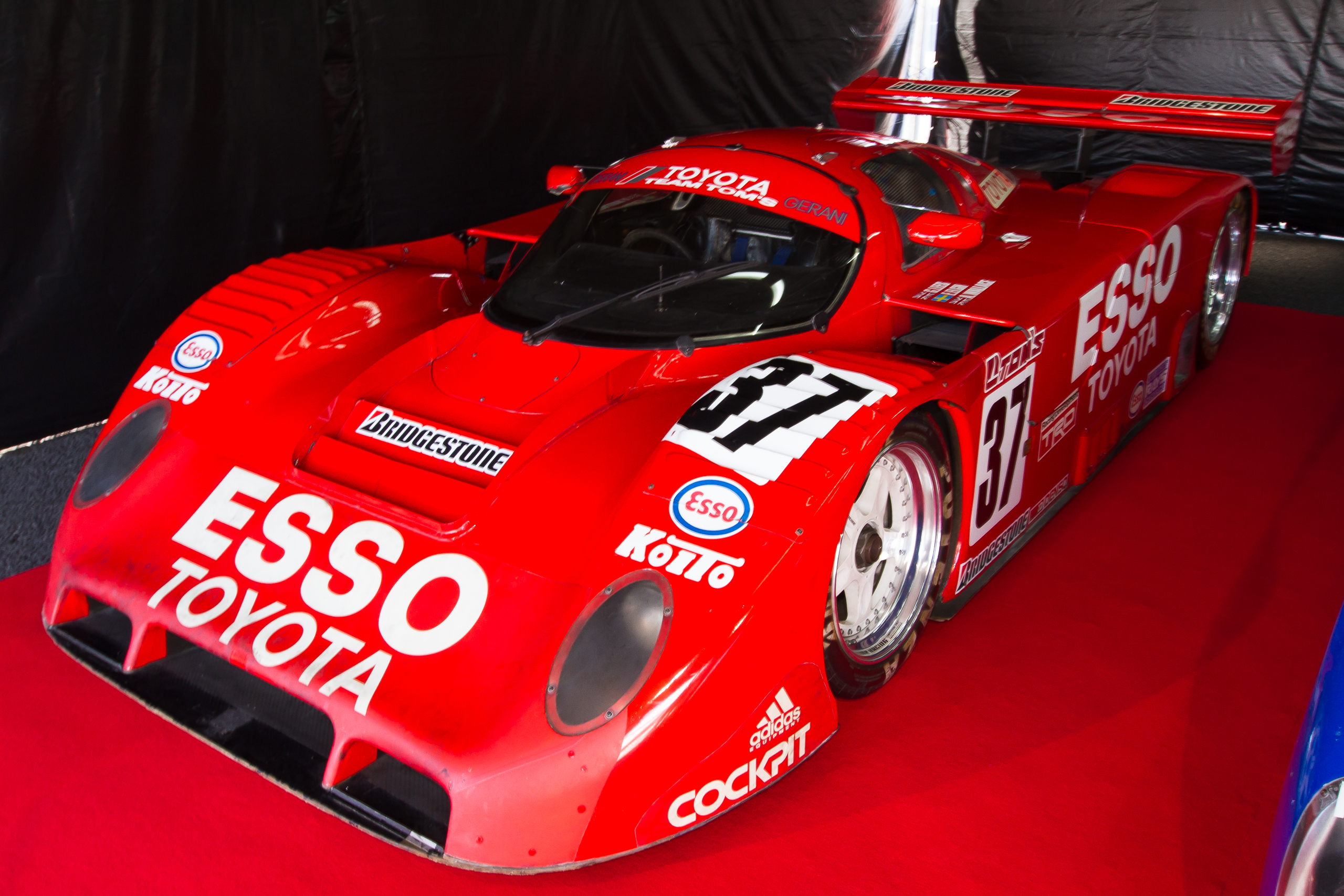
Toyota 91C-V

The Toyota 91C-V is a Group C sports prototype racing car, developed and built by Toyota intended to participate in the World Sportscar Championship, the 24 Hours of Le Mans, and the All-Japan Japanese Sports-Prototype Championship. It is an evolution of the previous 90C-V. Its powerplant is a turbocharged 3.2–3.6 L (200–220 cu in) Toyota V8 engine, producing 800 hp (600 kW). It won 3 races (including 1 class win), achieved 6 podium finishes, and scored 3 pole positions. At a speed of 200 mph (320 km/h), it is capable of producing over 5,000 lbf (22,000 N) of downforce.
