= Nissan R90C =

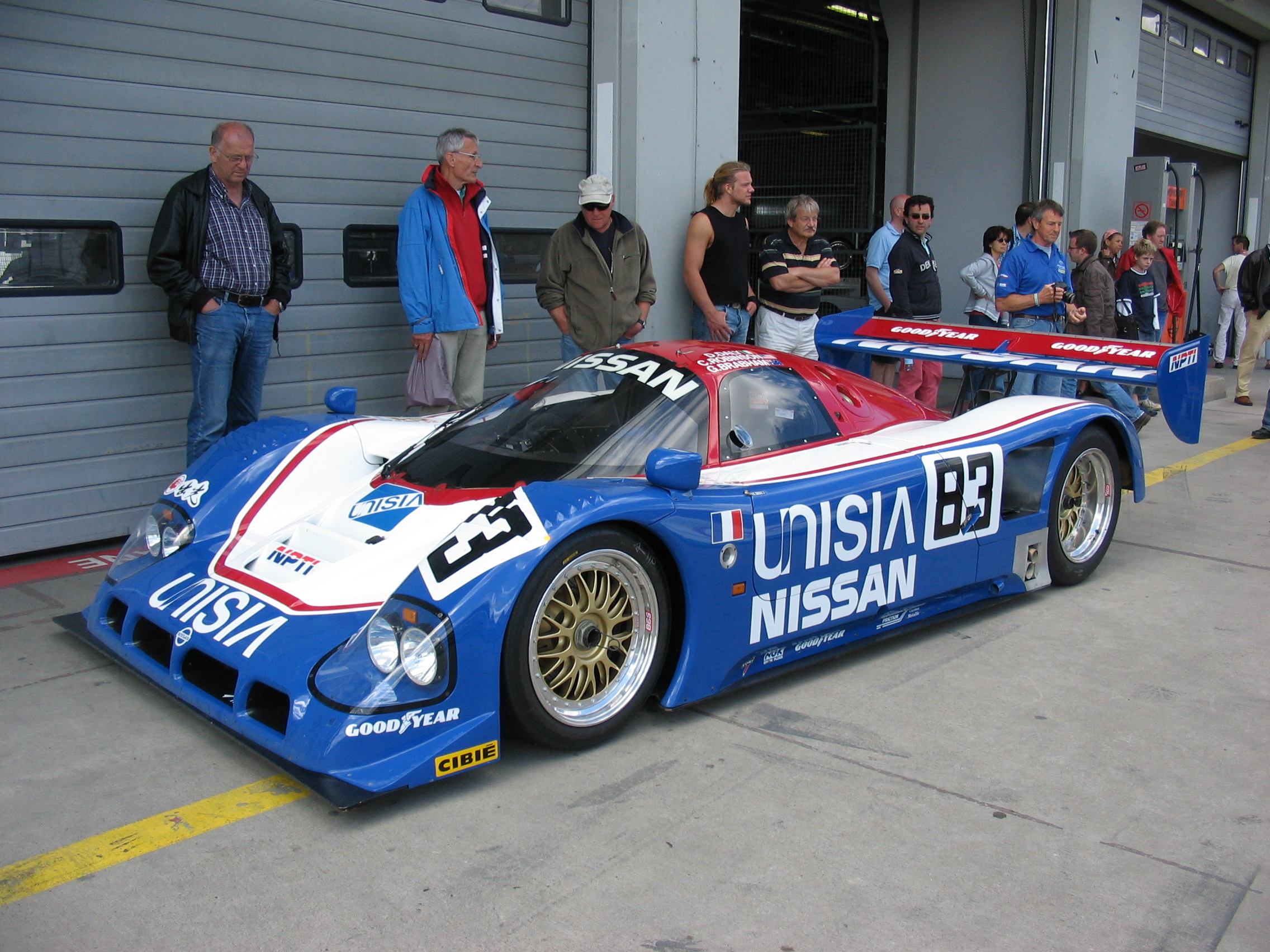
- A Nissan R90CK at DAMC 05 Oldtimer Festival Nürburgring in June 2007.

Overview
- Manufacturer: Nissan
- Production: 1990–1991
- Assembly: Japan
- Designer: Eric Broadley, Andy Scriven

Body and chassis
- Class: Group C
- Body style: closed
- Layout: Rear mid-engine, rear-wheel-drive

Powertrain
- Engine: VRH35Z twin-turbocharged DOHC 32-valve V8

Dimensions
- Wheelbase: 2,800 mm (110.2 in)
- Length: 4,800 mm (189.0 in)
- Width: 1,990 mm (78.3 in)
- Height: 1,100 mm (43.3 in)
- Curb weight: 900 kg (1,984 lb)

Chronology
- Predecessor: Nissan R89C

The Nissan R90C was a platform used for Group C racing cars built in 1990 by Nissan Motors for competition in World Sportscar Championship (WSC) based in Europe and the All Japan Sports Prototype Championship (JSPC). The cars based on the basic R90C platform would compete until 1993 before Nissan chose to withdraw from sports car racing, not returning until 1997. It won three JSPC championships and several significant endurance races during its career.

== Development ==
Mechanically, the R90Cs shared much with their predecessor, the R89C. Most of the chassis construction was the same, as well as the mechanical layout. The Nissan VRH35Z 3.5 litre twin-turbo V8 that debuted in the R89C was successful and kept as part of the R90C's design. Although mechanically similar, the cars were nearly all new constructions. Chassis builder Lola Cars International termed the cars T90/10, succeeding the T89/10.

Unlike the R89C, Nissan felt the car was a compromise. This led Nissan to develop two different cars. Although Lola built the basic chassis, Nissan Motorsports Europe constructed the R90CK in its shops evolving the R89C design. At the same time, the R90CP was built at Nismo's headquarters in Japan in a lower downforce, high speed layout. This gave the two cars a noticeably different design.

=== R90CK ===
The R90CK was an evolution of the R89C's design, borrowing many stylistic elements. The front end of the car was low, with two deep channels on either side of a slanted nose leading to radiator inlets on the sides of the cockpit. Small slated inlets were placed on the leading edge of the car, partially feeding brake cooling ducts. The cockpit featured a longer raked windshield than the R89C, yet the areas around the cockpit remained nearly identical, including the sides of the car. At the rear, the rear wing was mounted high on exposed struts for better downforce.

The design and development of NPTI's R90CK was conducted in association with Ray Mallock Limited and the cars were prepared and run out of RML's workshop in 1990, before being shipped to the United States to take part in the 1991 24 Hours of Daytona. In a week long test session booked by tyre supplier Dunlop, pre-season testing for the R90CK (alongside the older R89C) was conducted in part at the Phillip Island Grand Prix Circuit in Australia, which just happened to also be just a 90 km drive from the Melbourne home of Nissan Europe's British born Australian team manager, Howard Marsden who explained that the conditions in the Australian summer at Phillip Island were comparable to what they would experience in Europe and that the flowing, 4.448 km (2.764 mi) circuit was as close to the usual characteristics of most traditional European or British circuits as they'd find. It was reported at the time that the cars were lapping the circuit in the 1:18's which even in 2025 would make the Nissan's around 6 seconds faster than the current outright lap record.

=== R90CP ===
The R90CP ("P" referring to the Oppama Nissan plant where Nismo is based) had a low downforce design. The front of the car featured a higher nose, with the narrow channels eliminated and replaced with large ducts on the inside of the fender. The fenders themselves were also redesigned, with headlights placed vertically instead of the horizontal design on the R89C and R90CK. The cockpit of the R90CK was identical to its R90CP sibling, yet the sides of the bodywork were changed. Most notably, the rear-view mirrors were integrated into the bodywork on the fender, instead of small exposed mirrors on the side of the windshield. The turbo inlet was placed on the front edge of the rear fender, instead of on top of the engine cover on the R90CK. The rear wing was placed much lower on the car, with the rear wheel fender bodywork extending to connect with the rear wing endplates, similar to a style used on the Nissan GTP ZX-Turbo in North America.

=== Later versions ===
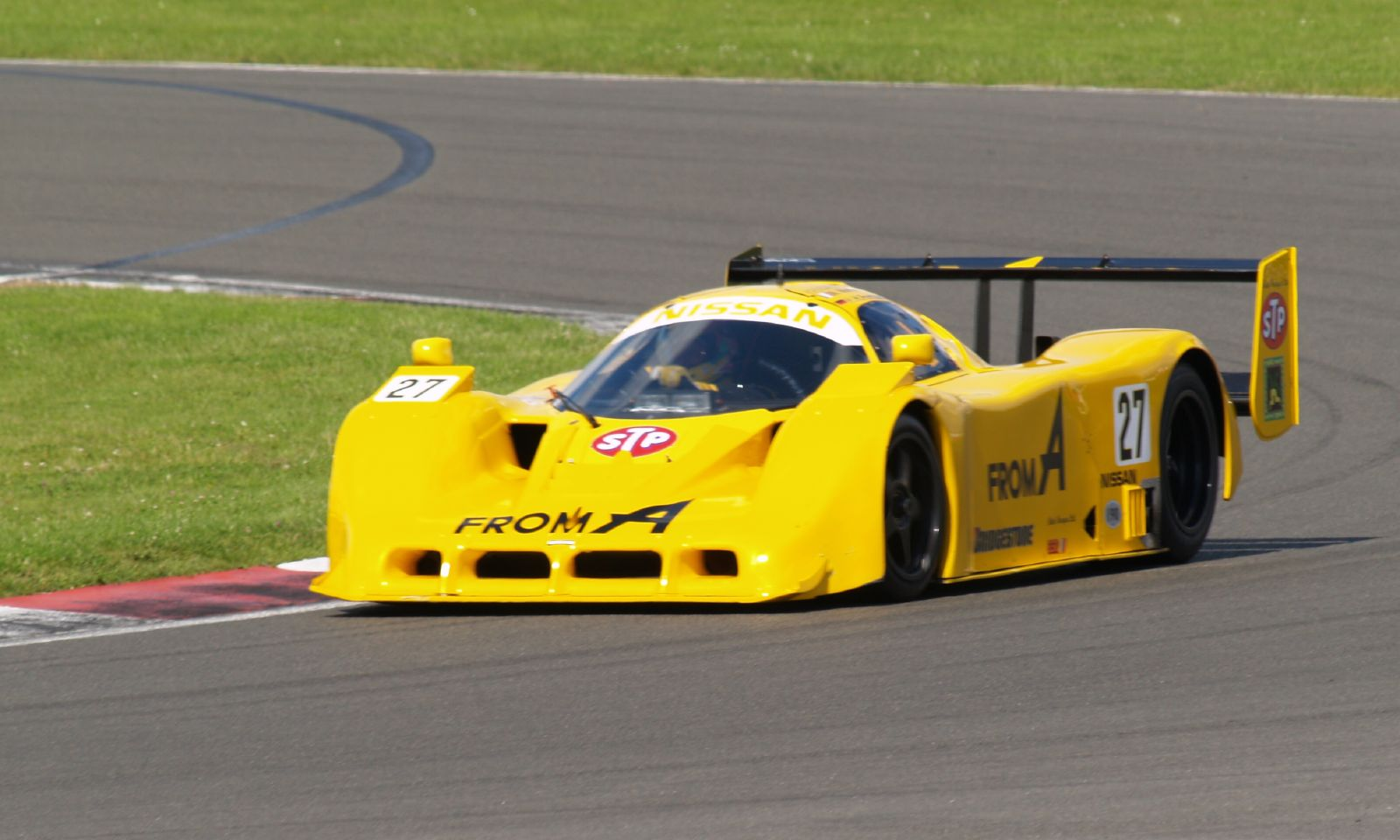
Nova Engineering's unique From-A Racing R91CK.

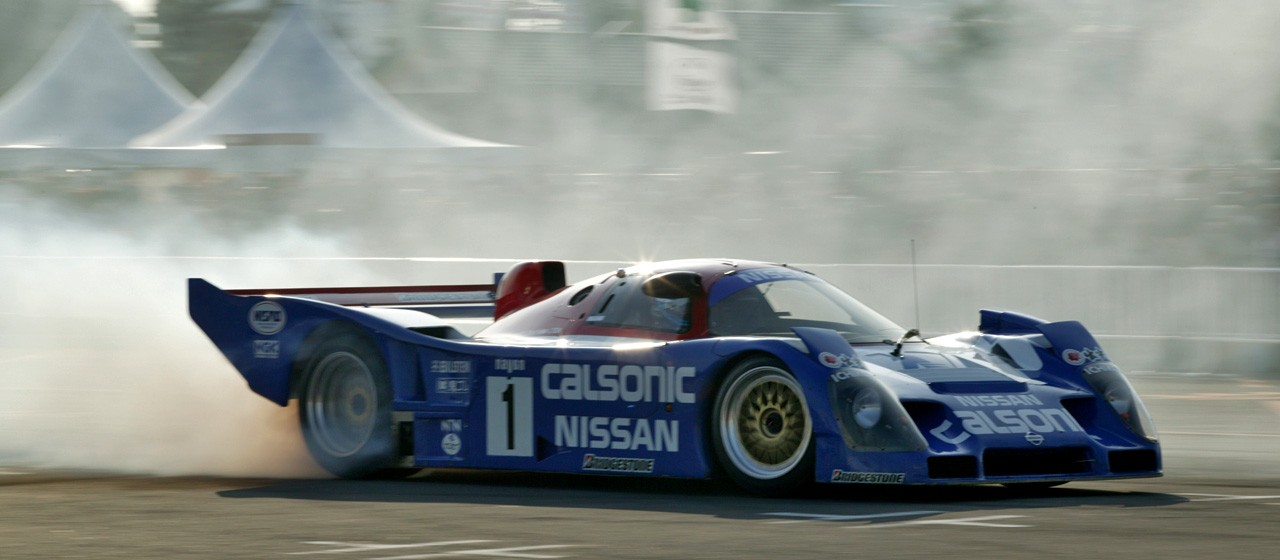
A Nissan R92CP, one of the cars based on the R90C platform.

For 1991, Nissan officially withdrew from the World Sportscar Championship. Nismo continued competition in the All Japan Sports Prototype Championship, and decided to upgrade the R90CPs to better compete with Toyota and Mazda. The new cars, known as R91CP and R91VP, had slight modifications over the previous car. Most notably, the boxy turbo inlets placed on the rear fenders of the R90CP were made into smaller slits, while a large snorkel was added to the top of the engine cover to cool the rear brakes in place of the previous twin brake ducts. The cars were further modified for 1992 with an upgraded VRH35Z twin-turbo V8, while the cars were renamed R92CP.

Nissan ran the R90CKs at the 24 Hours of Daytona following their retirement from the World Sportscar Championship at the end of 1990. For the 1992 running of Daytona, the R90CK's VRH35Z engines were replaced with smaller 3.0L twin-turbo V8s. They were not as successful as the race-winning R91CP.

There were three additional unique R90Cs. One was a R89C upgraded to become a R90CP, originally used by Nissan in the JSPC before all cars were completed. Nova Engineering purchased chassis #07 from Lola and initiated their own upgrades to the chassis, calling the car a R91CK. The final modified car was a R90CP bought by Team Le Mans and modified into the R91VP. The cars featured minor aerodynamic differences from the other R90CKs and R90CPs.

== Racing history ==
=== World Sportscar Championship ===
The opening round of the 1990 World Sportscar Championship season was held at Suzuka Circuit in Japan, but the new R90CKs intended for the series would not be completed in time for the event. The previous Nissan R89Cs were run by the European team. A lone JSPC R90CP was run by the Japanese team but did not finish. By the second round of the season at Monza, the first three R90CK chassis were completed with Northern Ireland's Kenny Acheson and Brits Julian Bailey and Mark Blundell joining Italian Gianfranco Brancatelli in the driving line-up. Although both cars ran well, one car would not have enough fuel to reach the end of the race. The second car would finish seventh.

Both cars ran towards the top of the field at Silverstone before a suspension failure and fuel problems eliminated both cars in the final few laps. The team would finally see some success at Circuit de Spa-Francorchamps, with both cars finishing and the Acheson-Bailey car taking third place, two minutes behind the winning Mercedes-Benz. The driver line-ups were switched for Dijon, and the new Bailey-Blundell duo took a podium.

Although the Nissans would not win podiums at the Nürburgring, the team finished both cars in the top ten for the first time. As the season went on, the team continued to improve. At Donington Park, both cars finish in the top six, with Acheson and Brancatelli finishing fourth following the post-race disqualification of both Jaguars.

At the fly-away round at Montreal, the R90CKs would take their best finish so far that season with a second-place finish. The race was stopped early due to dangerous conditions, but Bailey and Blundell were running only six seconds behind the leading Mercedes-Benz when the red flag was shown, with the second car Nissan finishing fifth. The good results for the team continued into the final round of the season at Mexico City with Bailey and Blundell taking second place once again, although this time two laps behind the winning Mercedes-Benz. Acheson and Brancatelli finished fourth place. In the team championship, Nissan finished third, four points behind Jaguar. Bailey was the highest ranking Nissan driver in the driver's championship, finishing in ninth place.

Following the season, Nissan chose to leave the World Sportscar Championship and concentrate on the JSPC and its efforts in the IMSA GT Championship in North America. Nissans only competed one other time before the World Sportscar Championship was abandoned after 1992, with Nova Engineering's R91CK running in an invitational class at the 1992 1000km of Suzuka, finishing in fourth place.

=== All Japan Sports Prototype Championship ===
==== 1990 ====
Differing from the WSC R90CKs, Nissan used its R90CPs for the All Japan Sports Prototype Championship. Japanese drivers Masahiro Hasemi, Toshio Suzuki, and Kazuyoshi Hoshino joined Swedish driver Anders Olofsson in the lineup. The cars debuted at the 500 km of Fuji and finished in second and fourth, behind Toyota's new 90C-V.

Following the cancellation of the second round at Fuji, a third race was scheduled at the track, and Nissan was able to score its first win. Hasemi and Olofsson drove their car to a two lap victory over a Porsche 962C, while the second car finished off the podium. Hoshino and Suzuki then took the next race win at the 1000km Suzuka, followed by Hasemi and Olofsson taking their second victory at Sugo. The final race of the JSPC season, once again at Fuji, broke Nissan's three race streak, with Toyota taking victory by just over a minute. Nissan won the manufacturer's championship, with all four Nissan drivers tying for the drivers championship.

==== 1991 ====
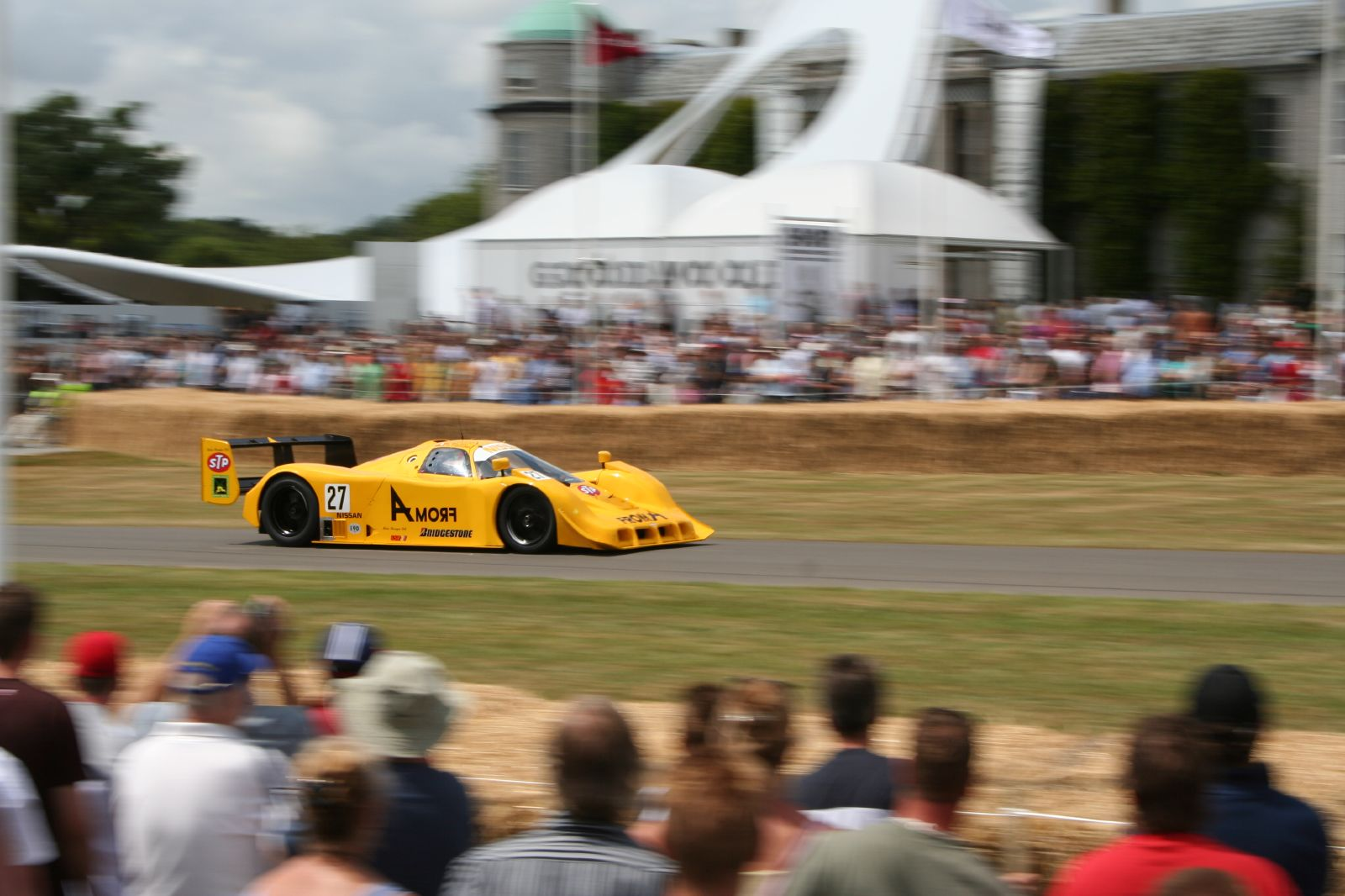
The JSPC From-A Racing R91CK during an exhibition at the 2006 Goodwood Festival of Speed.

For the 1991 season, Nissan upgraded its cars into the R91CPs, with some older cars sold off to privateers. Nova Engineering upgraded its R90C to R91CK specification utilizing the Yatabe (Japan Automobile Research Institute—JARI) wind tunnel, while Team Le Mans bought a R90CP and modified it into its own R91VP. Keeping the same driver line-up as the previous season, the factory Nissan team won the opening round at Fuji, while the Nova Engineering entry took second, and Team Le Mans fourth. At the second race at Fuji, Toyota debut its new 91C-V, but it could not fight the R91CPs. Nissan took the top two positions with its factory cars, a lap ahead of the new 91C-V.

By the third race at Fuji, Toyota was able to improve its new car and take its first overall victory of the season, with Nissan finishing second place, ten seconds behind. The second team car was taken out in an accident. The 1000 km Suzuka saw further problems for the team as the Nova Engineering entry took second place ahead of the factory entry in third, several laps behind. Nova was ahead of Nissan again at the next round, but all cars managed to finish on the same lap as the winning Toyota.

Nissan beat Toyota at the 1000 km Fuji, winning by a minute, though three of the Nissans were unable to finish. Jaguar won at the final race of the year, wit Toyota in second and Nissan in third and fourth, several laps behind. Nissan beat Toyota in the points championship by three points. Kazuyoshi Hoshino and Toshio Suzuki won the drivers championship by just two points over Toyota's leading pair.

==== 1992 ====
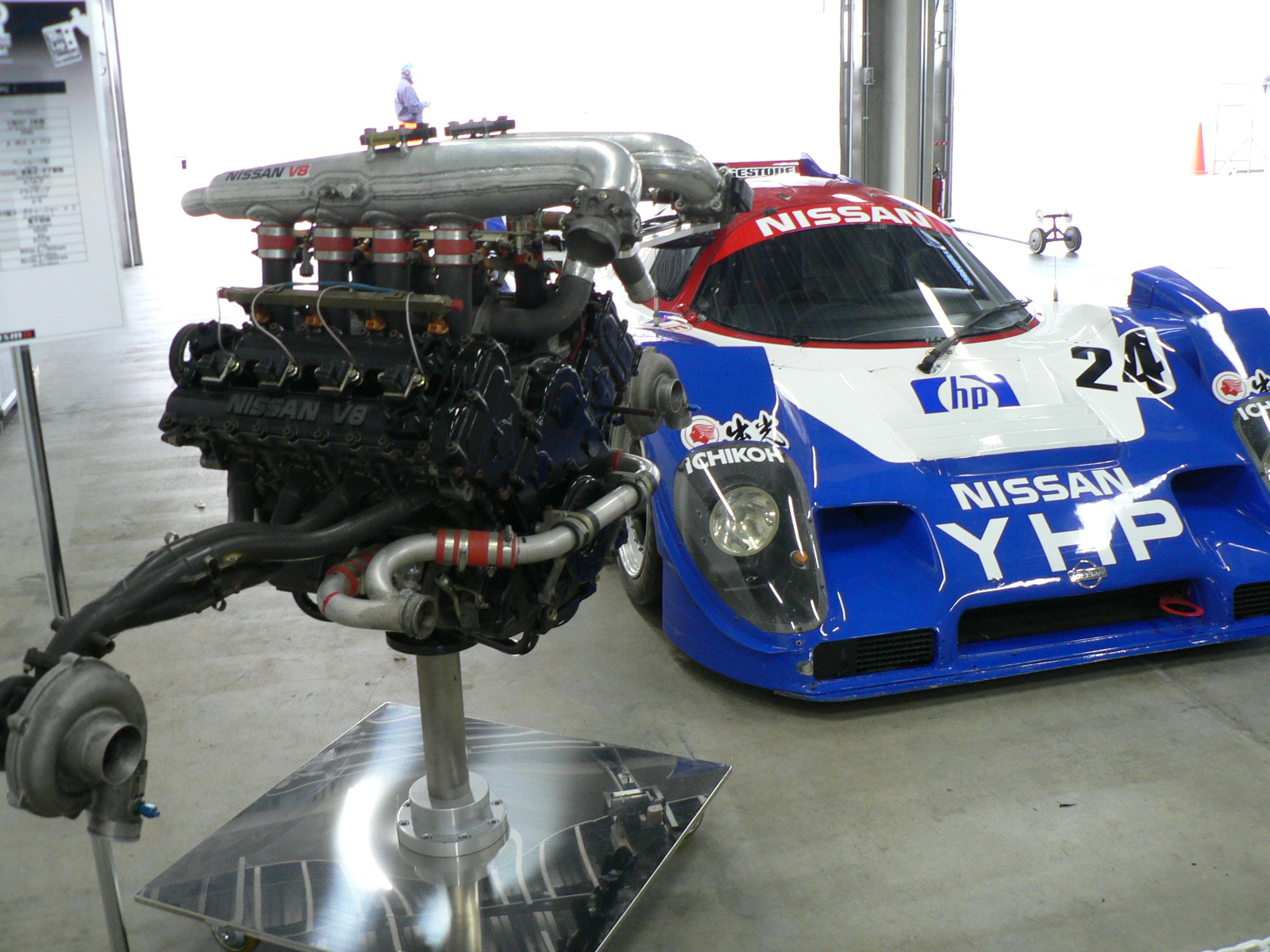
A R92CP with its VRH35Z engine shown at Nismo Festival in 2006.

In what would become the final season of JSPC, Nissan upgraded the R91CPs into the R92CPs. Nova Engineering retained its R91CK, and Team Le Mans left the series. Team Take One joined with a former factory R91CP. For the season, the championship was divided into two classes, with the older Nissans and the R92CPs running in class C1, while cars conformed with the 1992 World Sportscar Championship 3.5L engine specifications ran in class C.

At the opening round at Suzuka, no C class cars would compete. Nissan won in the R92CP's debut, with Jeff Krosnoff and Masahiko Kageyama replacing Anders Olofsson on the winning car's driver line-up. Nova's R91CK took second, ahead of a trio of new Toyota 92C-Vs. At the next round, the 1000 km Fuji, Mazda's Mazda MXR-01 C class car would suffer reliability problems. Problems for Toyota allowed Nissan to take the top four spots.

Nissan won the next race at Fuji, where Hoshino and Suzuki beat the fastest Toyota by over a minute. At Sugo, Nissan won and beat Toyota by just three seconds. Toyota brought its C class competitor, the TS010, to the second 1000 km Fuji and easily took the win over the second place R92CP. A second TS010 joined the final round at Mine, and Nissan brought its C class NP35. Even with five cars, Nissan could not defeat Toyota, as the TS010 won leaving Nissans in second and third. Nissan still won the C1 championship, even though Toyota won the separate C class. Kazuyoshi Hoshino won the solo drivers championship.

=== Other races ===
==== 24 Hours of Le Mans ====
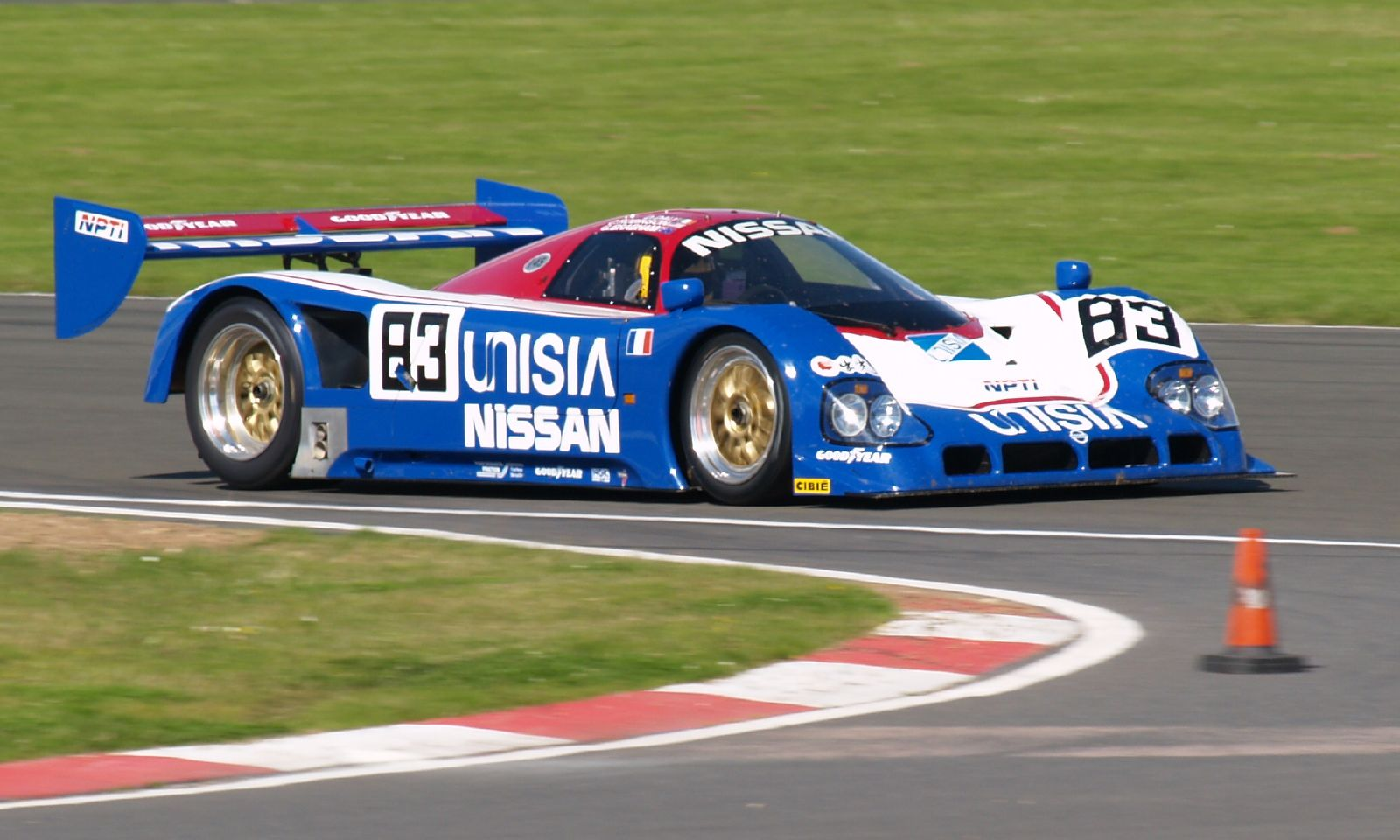
One of the R90CKs used by NPTI at the 24 Hours of Le Mans.

Beyond the World Sportscar Championship and All Japan Sports Prototype Championship, Nissan's R90Cs competed in other events around the world. Most notably, at the 1990 24 Hours of Le Mans, where four R90CKs and one R90CP were joined by two older privateer R89Cs. The JSPC Nissan Motorsport team entered a lone R90CP, while the WSC Nissan Motorsports team entered two new R90CKs. The American Nissan Performance Technology Inc. (NPTI) from the IMSA GT Championship team entered two R90CKs. Courage Compétition and Team Le Mans entered older R89Cs. Only three Nissans would finish. The lone R90CP of Masahiro Hasemi, Kazuyoshi Hoshino, and Toshio Suzuki finished fifth place, 11 laps behind the winning Jaguar. The American R90CK finished 17th place, while Courage's older R89C finished 22nd.

The R90CK was notable for achieving the highest straight line speed on the Mulsanne Straight at the Le Mans circuit following the installation of chicanes. Mark Blundell reached 366 km/h (226.9 mph) on his pole position lap — 24.2 mph less than the previous record trap speed without the chicanes in place. The qualifying engine, normally capable of up to 1000 bhp, had a mechanical issues causing the wastegate being jammed. The engine produced well over 1100 bhp. Bob Earl took the fastest lap during the race in the NPTI car at 3:40.030. The trap speed record still stands to this day. Nissan would not return to Le Mans with its prototypes until the Nissan R391 in 1999.

==== 24 Hours of Daytona ====
Nissan had a notable presence at the 24 Hours of Daytona. Although part of the IMSA GT Championship which was contested by Nissan's GTP ZX-Turbo, it was decided that the R90Cs were better suited for Daytona. Three R90CKs were entered in 1991 by NPTI under an invitational class for Group C cars. Although two failed to finish, the R90CK of Bob Earl, Derek Daly, Chip Robinson, and Geoff Brabham finished first in class and in second place overall, 18 laps behind the winning Joest Racing Porsche 962C.

Nissan returned in 1992 with even more cars. Two R90CKs were modified with motors that allowed them to run the IMSA GTP class. The factory team brought a R91CP from Japan, which competed in the invitational class. Nova Engineering Racing from Japan competed with their R91CK, also in the invitational class. While the R90CKs suffered, the R91CP won by nine laps.

==== Final appearance ====
The R90C platform made its final appearance at the 1993 1000km Suzuka, part of the new All Japan GT Championship (JGTC) which replaced the JSPC. Team Le Mans entered a former factory R92CP, while Nova Engineering entered its R91CK. The two cars easily took victory, with Team Le Mans ahead of Nova Engineering, both ahead of only other prototype, the Spice-Acura.
