= Takashi Yorino =

Japanese racing driver

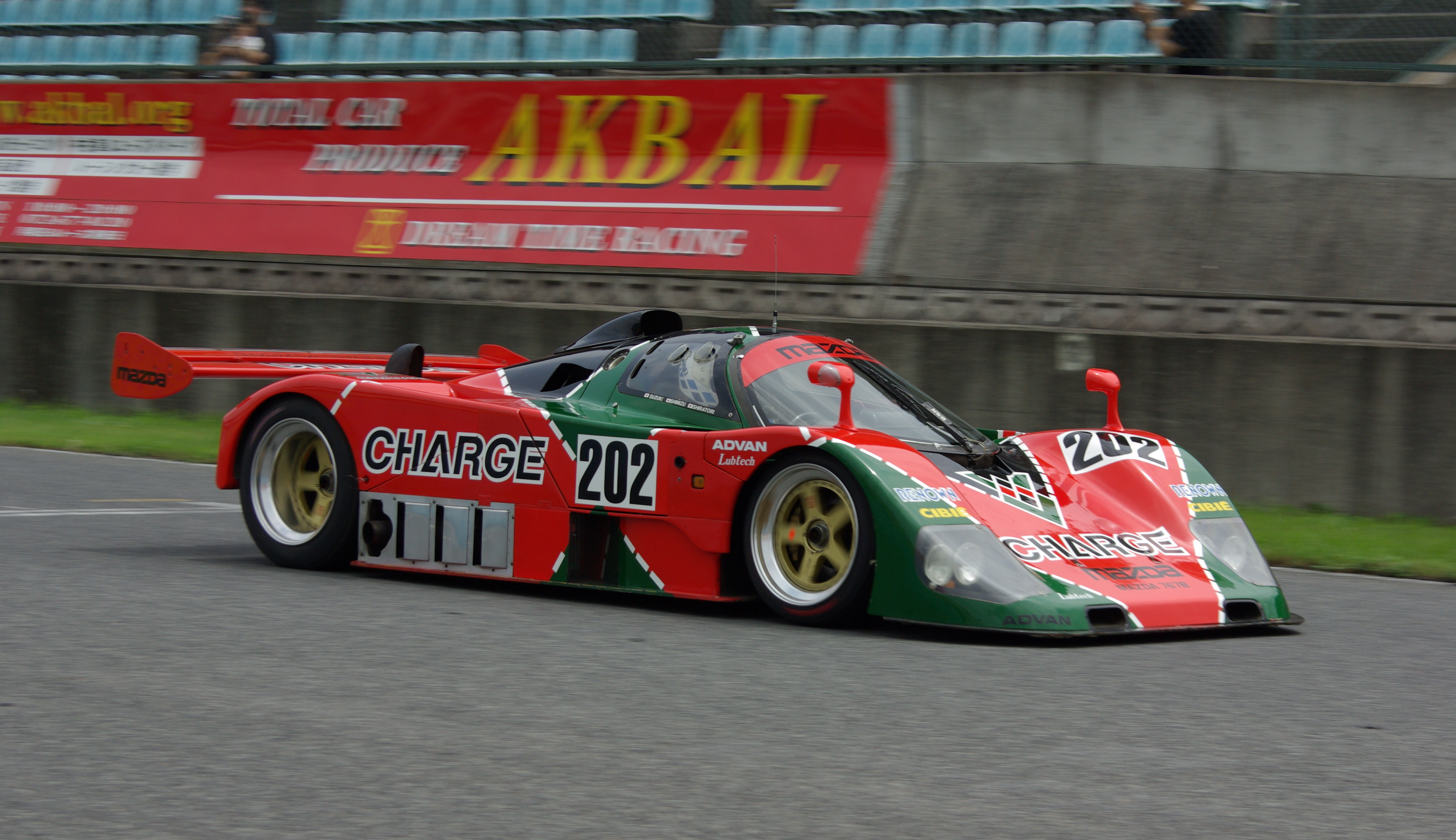
Mazda 767B

Takashi Yorino (born 10 October 1950) is a Japanese former racing driver who placed 20th overall and won the GTP class in the 1990 24 Hours of Le Mans driving a Mazda 767.

== Racing record ==
=== 24 Hours of Le Mans results ===
Year	Team	Co-Drivers	Car	Class	Laps	Pos.	Class Pos.
1982	(Japan) Mazdaspeed Co. Ltd.	(Japan) Yojiro Terada (Australia) Allan Moffat	Mazda RX-7	IMSA; GTX	282	14th	6th
1983	(Japan) Mazdaspeed Co. Ltd.	(Japan) Yojiro Terada (Japan) Yoshimi Katayama	Mazda 717C	C Jr	302	12th	1st
1984	(Japan) Mazdaspeed Co. Ltd.	(Japan) Pierre Dieudonné (Japan) Yojiro Terada	Mazda 727C	C2	261	20th	6th
1985	(Japan) Mazdaspeed Co. Ltd.	(Japan) Yoshimi Katayama (Japan) Yojiro Terada	Mazda 737C	C2	263	24th	6th
1986	(Japan) Mazdaspeed Co. Ltd.	(Japan) Yojiro Terada (Japan) Yoshimi Katayama	Mazda 757	GTP	59	DNF.	DNF.
1987	(Japan) Mazdaspeed Co. Ltd.	(Japan) Yoshimi Katayama (Japan) Yojiro Terada	Mazda 757	GTP	34	DNF.	DNF.
1988	(Japan) Mazdaspeed Co. Ltd.	(Belgium) Hervé Regout (United Kingdom) Will Hoy	Mazda 767	GTP	305	19th	3rd
1989	(Japan) Mazdaspeed Co. Ltd.	(Belgium) Hervé Regout (United States) Elliott Forbes-Robinson	Mazda 767B	GTP	365	9th	2nd
1990	(Japan) Mazdaspeed Co. Ltd.	(Japan) Yoshimi Katayama (Japan) Yojiro Terada	Mazda 787	GTP	304	20th	1st
1991	(Japan) Mazdaspeed Co. Ltd.	(Belgium) Pierre Dieudonné (Japan) Yojiro Terada	Mazda 787	C2	346	8th	8th
1992	(Japan) Mazdaspeed Co. Ltd.	(Brazil) Maurizio Sandro Sala (Japan) Yojiro Terada	Mazda MXR-01	C1	124	DNF.	DNF.
