= Maurizio Sandro Sala =

Brazilian former racing driver (born 1958)

- Born: August 27, 1958 (age 68) São Paulo, Brazil

Previous series
- 1983 1984 1986 1987–1988 1989–1991 1989–1992 and 1995–1996: Formula Ford 1600 BRDC; Formula Ford 2000, Great Britain; Formula Three, Great Britain; Formula Three, Japan; Formula 3000, Japan; 24 Hours of Le Mans

Championship titles
- 1983 1984: Formula Ford 1600 BRDC; Formula Ford 2000 Great Britain

Maurizio Sandro Sala (born 27 August 1958 in São Paulo) is a Brazilian former racing driver. He drove in multiple classes of racing in a career lasting from 1978 to 2004.

== Racing record ==
=== Complete British Formula 3 results ===
(key) (Races in bold indicate pole position) (Races in italics indicate fastest lap)

Year	Entrant	Engine	1	2	3	4	5	6	7	8	9	10	11	12	13	14	15	16	17	18	DC	Pts
1985	Maurizio Sandro Sala	Saab	SIL; 12	THR; Ret	SIL; 7	THR; 6	DON; 4	**ZOL**; 6	THR; 8	THR; Ret	SIL; Ret	BRH; 7	SIL; Ret	DON; Ret	SNE; Ret	OUL	SIL; 12	SPA	ZAN; 9	SIL; 8	13th	5
1986	Eddie Jordan Racing	VW	THR; 1	SIL; 2	**THR**; 1	**SIL**; 1	BRH; 22	THR; 5	DON; 2	SIL; 1	SIL; 3	OUL; 3	ZAN; 2	DON; 5	SNE; 1	SIL; Ret	BRH; 21	SPA; Ret	ZOL; 7	SIL; 3	2nd	83

=== Complete Japanese Formula 3 results ===
(key) (Races in bold indicate pole position) (Races in italics indicate fastest lap)

Year	Team	Engine	1	2	3	4	5	6	7	8	9	10	DC	Pts
1987	Team LeMans	Nissan	SUZ; 5	TSU; 5	FUJ; Ret	SUZ; 4	SUG; 9	SEN; 8	MIN; 4	TSU; DNS	SUZ	SUZ; 9	7th	43
1988	DHL Oronamin C Ralt	Nissan	SUZ; 4	**TSU**; 1	FUJ; 4	SUZ; 15	SUG; 3	TSU; 3	**SEN**; 1	SUZ; 10	MIN; 3	SUZ; 3	3rd	40

=== Complete International Formula 3000 results ===
(key) (Races in bold indicate pole position; races in italics indicate fastest lap.)

Year	Entrant	1	2	3	4	5	6	7	8	9	10	11	Pos.	Pts
1988	Madgwick International	JER	VAL	PAU	SIL	MNZ	PER	BRH	BIR	BUG	ZOL; 8	DIJ	32nd	0

=== Complete Japanese Formula 3000 Championship results ===
(key) (Races in bold indicate pole position) (Races in italics indicate fastest lap)

Year	Team	Engine	1	2	3	4	5	6	7	8	9	10	11	DC	Pts
1989	Funaki Racing	Mugen Honda	SUZ; 13	FUJ; 7	MIN; 10	SUZ; 7	SUG; 9	FUJ; 18	SUZ; 11	SUZ; Ret				NC	0
1990	Funaki Racing	Mugen Honda	SUZ; 16	FUJ; DNQ	MIN; Ret	SUZ; 8	SUG; 9	FUJ; 19	FUJ; 15	SUZ; 21	FUJ; 7	SUZ; DNQ		NC	0
1991	Super Evolution Racing Team	Mugen Honda	SUZ	AUT	FUJ	MIN	SUZ; DNQ	SUG; Ret	FUJ; 14	SUZ; 16	FUJ; C	SUZ; Ret	FUJ; 4	19th	3

=== Complete 24 Hours of Le Mans results ===
Year	Team	Co-drivers	Car	Class	Laps	Pos.	Class Pos.
1989	(Switzerland) Brun Motorsport (Japan) Alpha Racing Team	(Austria) Roland Ratzenberger (Austria) Walter Lechner	Porsche 962C	C1	58	DNF	DNF
1990	(Japan) Team Le Mans	(Japan) Takao Wada (Sweden) Anders Olofsson	Nissan R89C	C1	182	DNF	DNF
1991	(Japan) Mazdaspeed Co. Ltd. (France) Oreca	(Republic of Ireland) David Kennedy (Sweden) Stefan Johansson	Mazda 787B	C2	355	6th	6th
1992	(Japan) Mazdaspeed (France) Oreca	(Germany) Volker Weidler (Belgium) Bertrand Gachot (United Kingdom) Johnny Herbert	Mazda MXR-01	C1	336	4th	4th
1995	(United Kingdom) GTC Gulf Racing	(United Kingdom) Mark Blundell (United Kingdom) Ray Bellm	McLaren F1 GTR	GT1	291	4th	**3rd**
1996	(United Kingdom) Kokusai Kaihatsu Racing (France) Giroix Racing Team	(Switzerland) Jean-Denis Délétraz (France) Fabien Giroix	McLaren F1 GTR	GT1	146	DNF	DNF
