= Nismo =

Nissan motorsports division

Nissan Motorsport
- Trade name: Nismo
- Type: Division
- Industry: Automotive
- Founded: 17 September 1984; 42 years ago (as a company); 1 April 2022; 4 years ago (as a division)
- Headquarters: Yokohama, Kanagawa Prefecture, Japan
- Products: Cars, auto parts
- Services: Tuning and racing
- Parent: Nissan
- Website: www.nismo.com

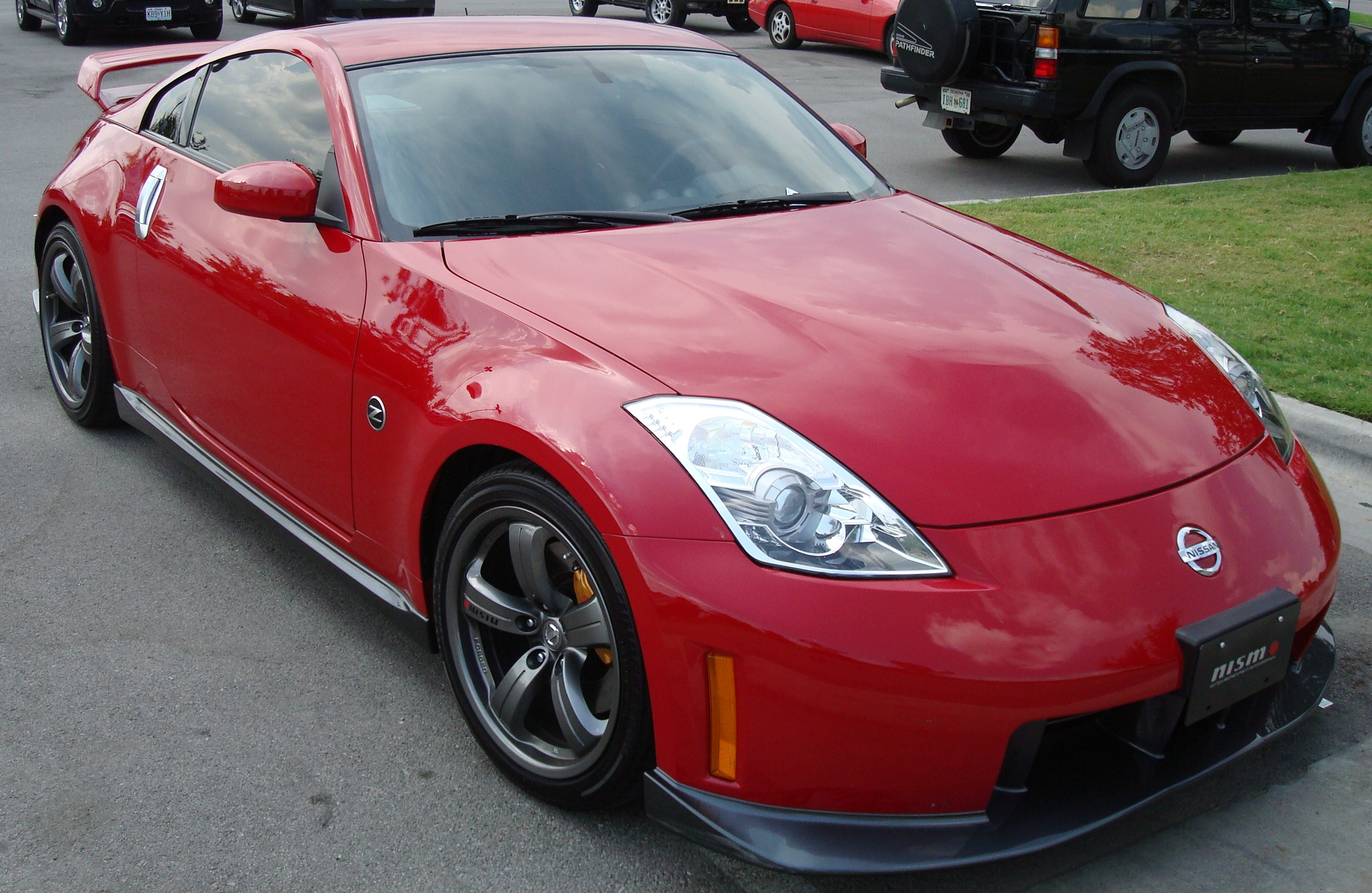
2007 Nismo 350Z

Nissan Motorsport (ニッサン・モータースポーツ, Nissan Mōtāsupōtsu), abbreviated as Nismo, is the performance and car tuning division of Nissan. Nismo was initially a company, Nissan Motorsports International Co., Ltd. (ニッサン・モータースポーツ・インターナショナル株式会社, Nissan Mōtā Supōtsu Intānashonaru Kabushiki-gaisha), formed in September 1984 as a result of a merger of two motorsport departments, being the in-house tuning, motorsports and performance subsidiary of Nissan. It has competed in JSPC, JTCC, the 24 Hours of Le Mans and the 24 Hours of Daytona. As of 2025, they participate in Super GT in Japan and in Formula E internationally. Nismo ceased to be a company in April 2022 by being merged with sister company Autech into a new Nissan subsidiary, Nissan Motorsport & Customizing.

== History ==
The Nismo story began in 1964 when a local company called Prince Motor Company realized that they could boost their sales by going into the competitive motorsport business. Nismo's competitive motorsport debut was on May 3, 1964, with the Prince Skyline 2000GT (S54) taking all positions from 2nd to 6th, behind only the Porsche 904 in 1st.

In 1984, Nissan merged its two motorsport divisions, originally founded in the 1960s: Oppama Works (known as Publication Division 3), based in its Oppama factory, which was responsible for the needs of privateer teams and Ōmori Works (Special Car Testing Division), based in the Ōmori plant, responsible for factory operations. The company's intention following the merger was to specialize in sportscar racing, but it also provided support for teams competing in the domestic F3 series.

In 1988 the first dedicated race car by Nissan debuted, and saw incredible performance in circuit races. This vehicle was the iconic Nissan Skyline R32, sporting the GT-R badge.

In 1988, Nismo built its first car, the Saurus for motorsport use for its one-make series. The following year they developed the Skyline GT-R for racing as well as building the 500 evolution editions for road use. The R34, the R32's generational grandchild was the first car to be produced with a V-Spec.

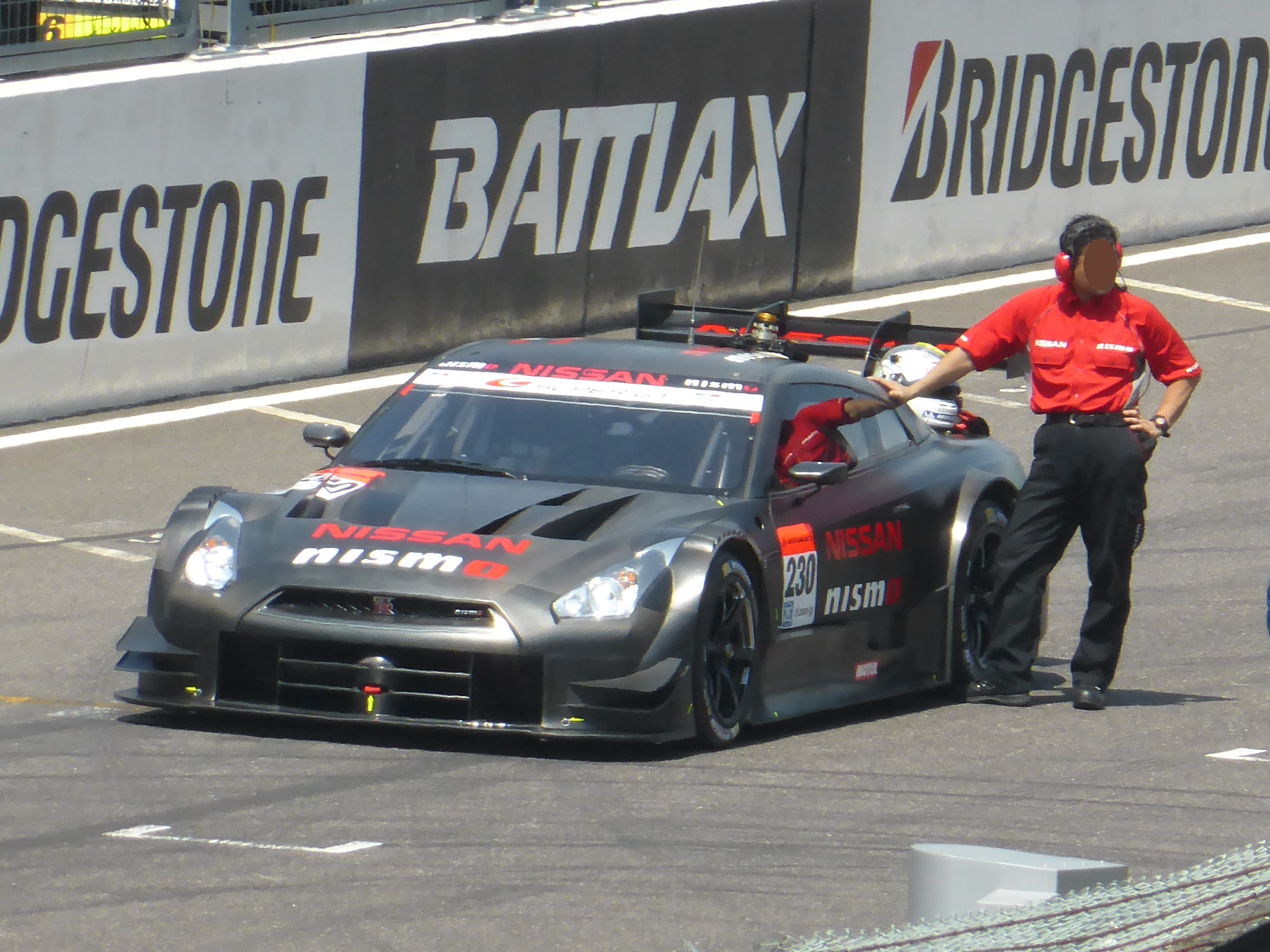
The second facelift Nissan GT-R at its first public presentation at the 2013 42nd International Pokka Sapporo 1000km.

In December 2021, Nissan said it would merge Nismo and sister company Autech (a tuning and conversion operation) into a new company called Nissan Motorsports & Customizing Co., Ltd.. The merge was completed on April 1, 2022.

In October 2026 Nismo opened its first performance centre outside of Japan in Melbourne, Australia.

== Products ==
Products include the GT-R, 370Z, Sentra, Frontier, and the Juke Nismo. Soon to be added to the range is the hatchback Nissan Pulsar Nismo and the electric Nissan Leaf

=== Tuning kits ===
Nismo designs and manufactures a range of aftermarket performance parts for Nissan cars including aerodynamics parts such as spoilers and diffusers, alloy wheels, engine and suspension parts. The 2017 Infiniti Q60, being much criticized for its mild exhaust sound, about six months after its introduction had a specially tuned Nismo muffler made available through Infiniti dealers as an aftermarket item.

Most Datsun, Nissan, and Infiniti branded cars have performance parts available from Nismo, either in production or as old stock. For example, Nismo sells parts such as unground cam billets, performance cams, pistons, etc. for the KA24E engine, which was used in the Nissan small pickup truck for several years and also used for the 1989 and 1990 model years of 240SX, a popular car among Import scene enthusiasts (especially Drifters) in North America.

In Japan, the V35 Skyline and Z33 Fairlady have both received several levels of Nismo tuning packages (E-Type, S-Tune, R-Tune, and S1 packages), with a full track spec Fairlady Z debuted at the 2005 Nismo Festival of Speed held at (formerly) Fuji International Raceway.

In January 2007, Nismo announced the launch of the Nismo 380RS. The Nismo 380RS is a factory modified version of the Nissan Z33 Fairlady Z tuned by both Nismo and Autech. Two versions were released, the first was a track-only model called the 380RS-C (C for competition), the second is a street model being sold at Nissan dealers. Both versions use a Nissan VQ series V6 engine, bored and stroked to 3.8L. The track-only 380RS-C makes 400 hp (298 kW), and the street version makes approximately 350 hp (261 kW). The Nismo 380RS was only sold in Japan.

=== Production cars ===
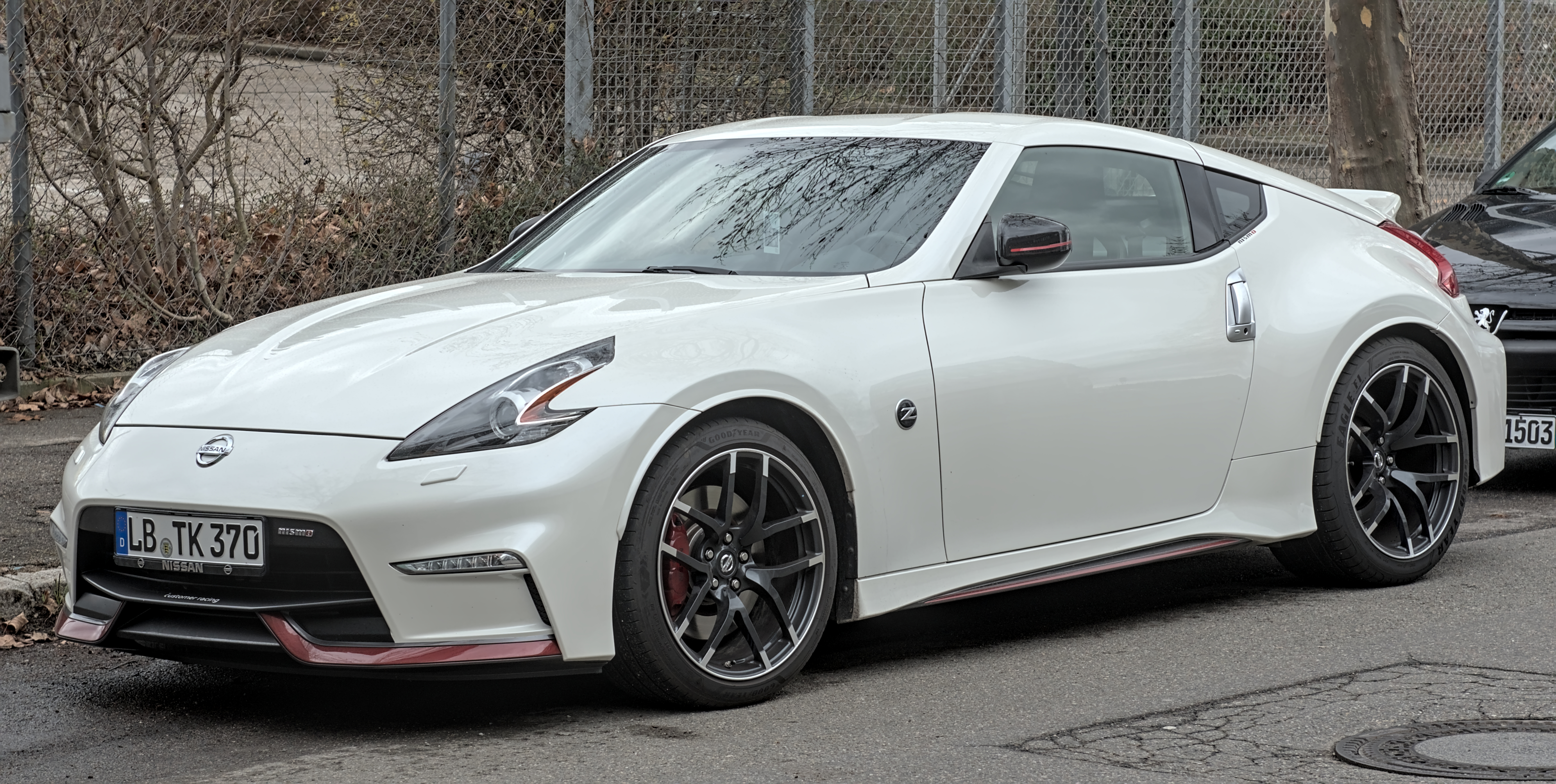
A 2016 Nismo 370Z

The first Nismo-branded car was the 1987 Skyline R31 GTS-R Group A evolution special limited to 823 examples. This was followed by the 1990 Skyline GT-R Nismo of which only 560 were produced. Both cars featured weight-saving, aerodynamic, performance and reliability improvements necessary for the rigours of Group A competition.

The next Nismo release was the Skyline GT-R R34 'Z-Tune'. Intended to celebrate the 2005 20th anniversary of Nismo, the 2003 cancellation of R34 production meant that Nismo was only able to create 20 cars, all based on second-hand V.spec units purchased back from customers with less than 30,000 km on the odometer. The Z Tune sold for ¥17,745,000 (US$146,600, as of December 7, 2005) in Japan. However, the parts-conversion version, where the customer's Skyline GT-R's become the base car, sells for ¥13,125,000 (US$108,500, as of December 7, 2005). Due to rarity the GT-R Z-tune can exceed US$500,000 in the car market. The engine is an RB28DETT Z2 (a normal GT-R engine with a stroked displacement of 2.8 liters & Nismo parts designed specifically for the Z2). The car weighs 1,600 kg (3,527 lb).

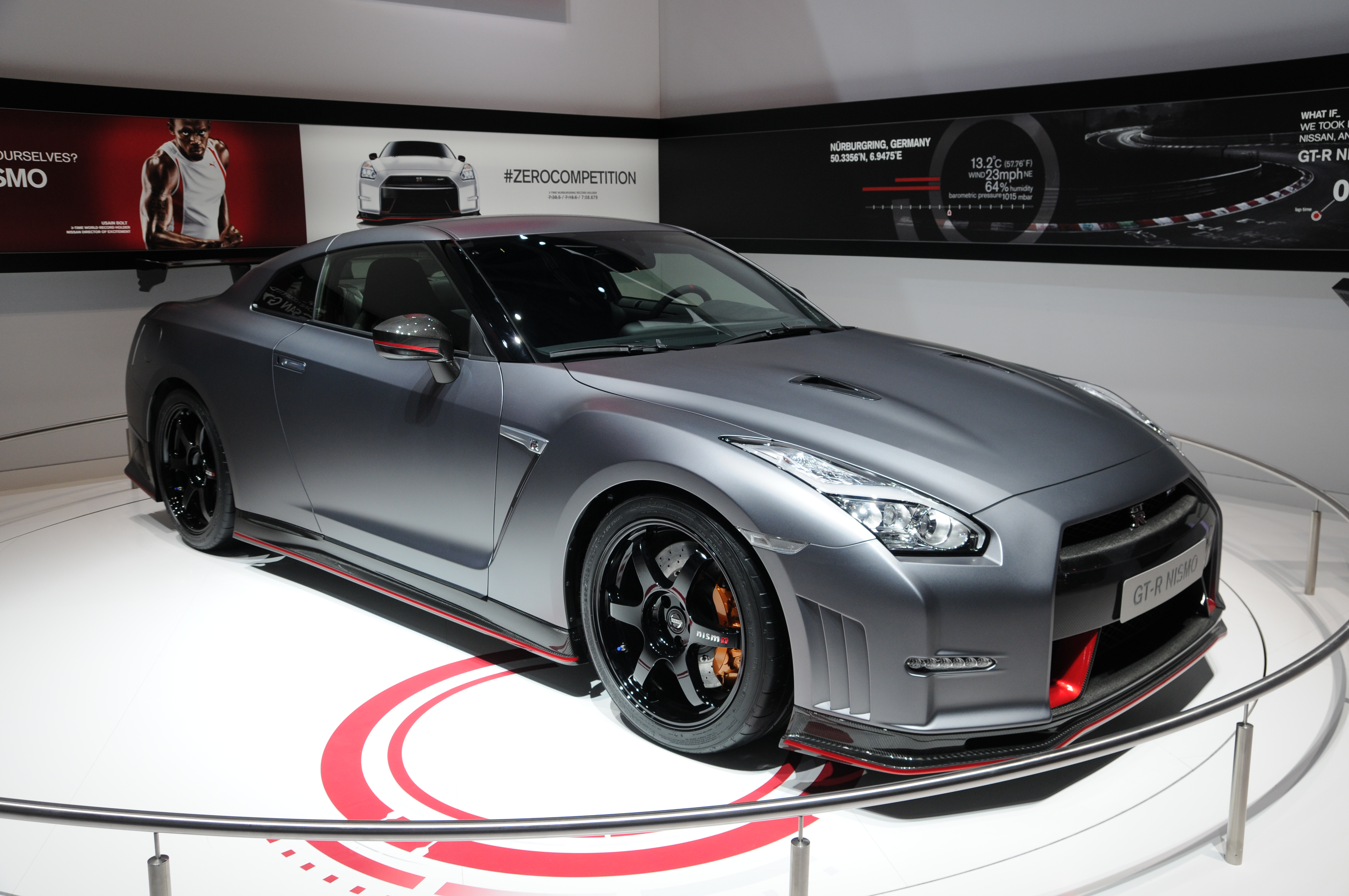
A 2015 Nismo GT-R

Nismo was also responsible for the R33 Skyline 400R and S14 Silvia 270R models. Both featured comprehensive modifications to the drivetrain, suspension, brakes, chassis, and aero work. Very limited numbers of both models were sold in 1997, and both command high resale prices even today. These models stressed Nismo's link to street car tuning, and were developed (as was the Z-Tune GT-R) at their Chiba City tuning garage. Nismo street tuned vehicles have been sold at Nissan dealerships for years, and come with full warranties. Nismo also produced 21 versions of the Pulsar GTi-R, essentially these cars contained all of the NISMO Group N parts available at the time in a fully built car.

==== List of Nismo-branded consumer vehicles ====
Base Model	Nismo Model	Production Years	Markets
350Z	Nismo 350Z	2004–2008	Japan
370Z	Nismo 370Z	2009–2020	Japan, Middle East and North America
Armada	Armada Nismo	2025–present	United States and Canada
Ariya	Ariya Nismo	2024–present	Europe
GT-R	GT-R Nismo	2014–2025	Japan
Juke	Juke Nismo	2013–2017	Europe
Micra	March Nismo	2013–present	Europe
Note	Note Aura Nismo	2014–present	Japan
Patrol	Patrol Nismo	2015–present	Middle East
Sentra	Sentra Nismo	2017–2019	North America
Silvia	Nismo 270R	1994	Japan
Skyline GT-R	Skyline GT-R Nismo	1989–1994	Japan
Skyline	Skyline Nismo	2023–present	Japan
X-Trail	X-Trail Nismo	2025–present	Japan
Z	Z Nismo	2024–present	Japan, United States, Canada and Middle East
Leaf	Leaf Nismo	2020–present	Japan

== Japanese Grand Prix ==
In the 1960s, Nissan competed in the Japanese Grand Prix sports car race.

== IMSA GT Championship ==
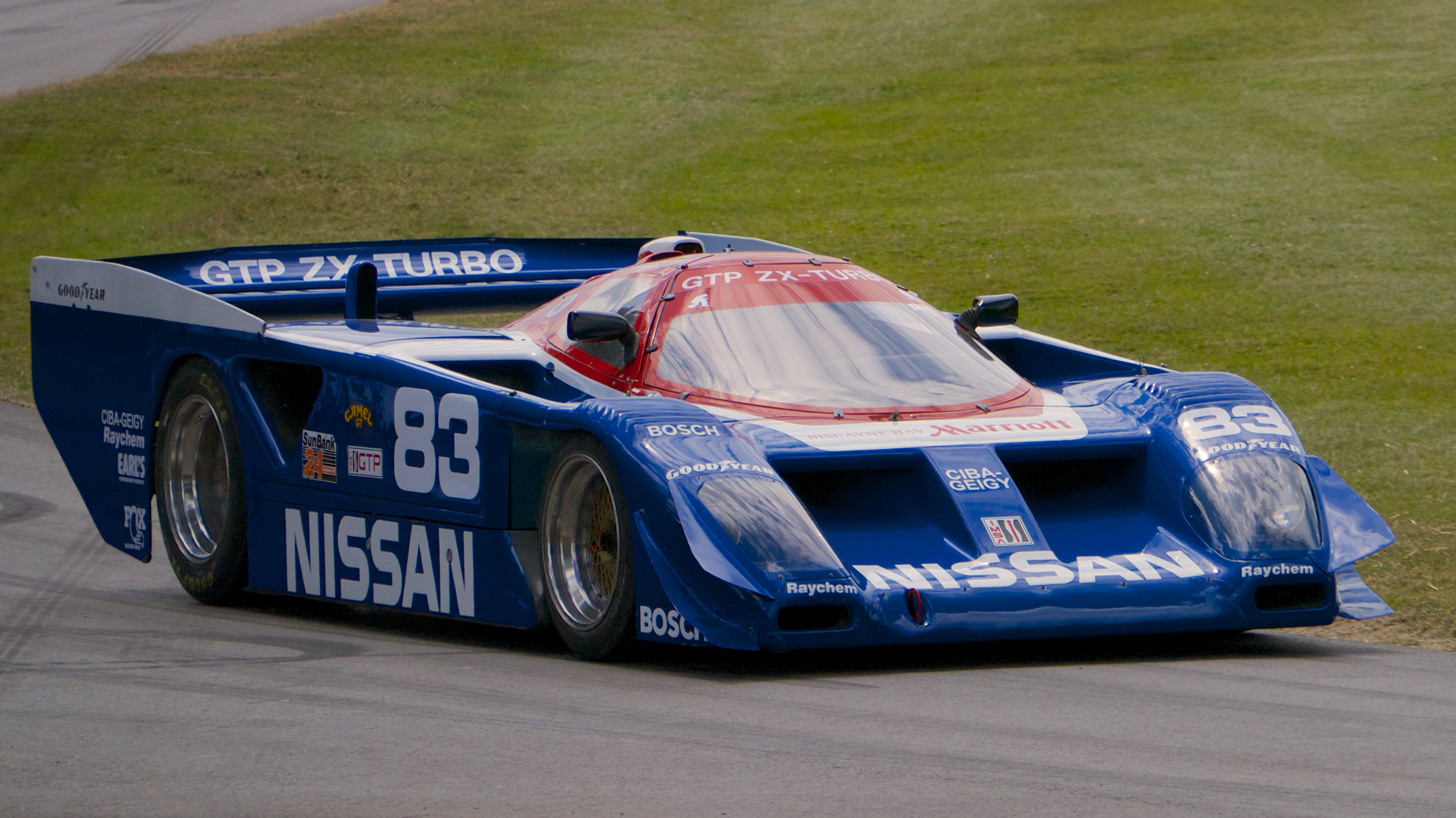
A Nissan GTP ZX-Turbo at the 2014 Goodwood Festival of Speed

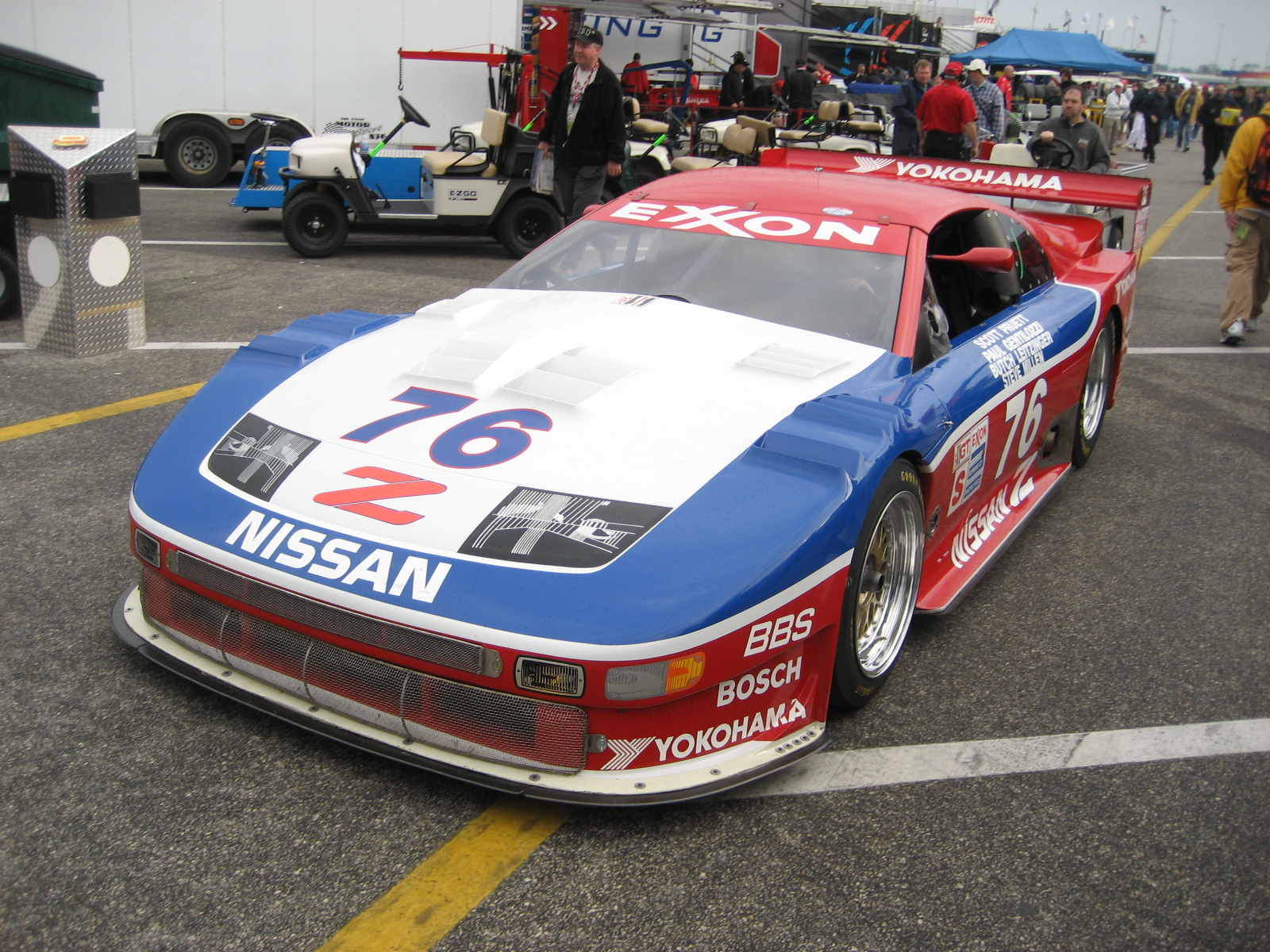
The Clayton Cunningham Racing 300ZX which won the 1994 24 Hours of Daytona.

Nissan joined the IMSA GT Championship in 1979, where it competed in the GT classes with the 240SX, 280ZX and 300ZX. From 1985 to 1993, they entered the main GTP class with the GTP ZX-Turbo and NPT-90. Geoff Brabham won four GTP drivers championships with Nissan from 1988 to 1991, and the manufacturer won the 1992 24 Hours of Daytona and the 1989, 1990 and 1991 12 Hours of Sebring.

== World Sports Prototype Championship ==
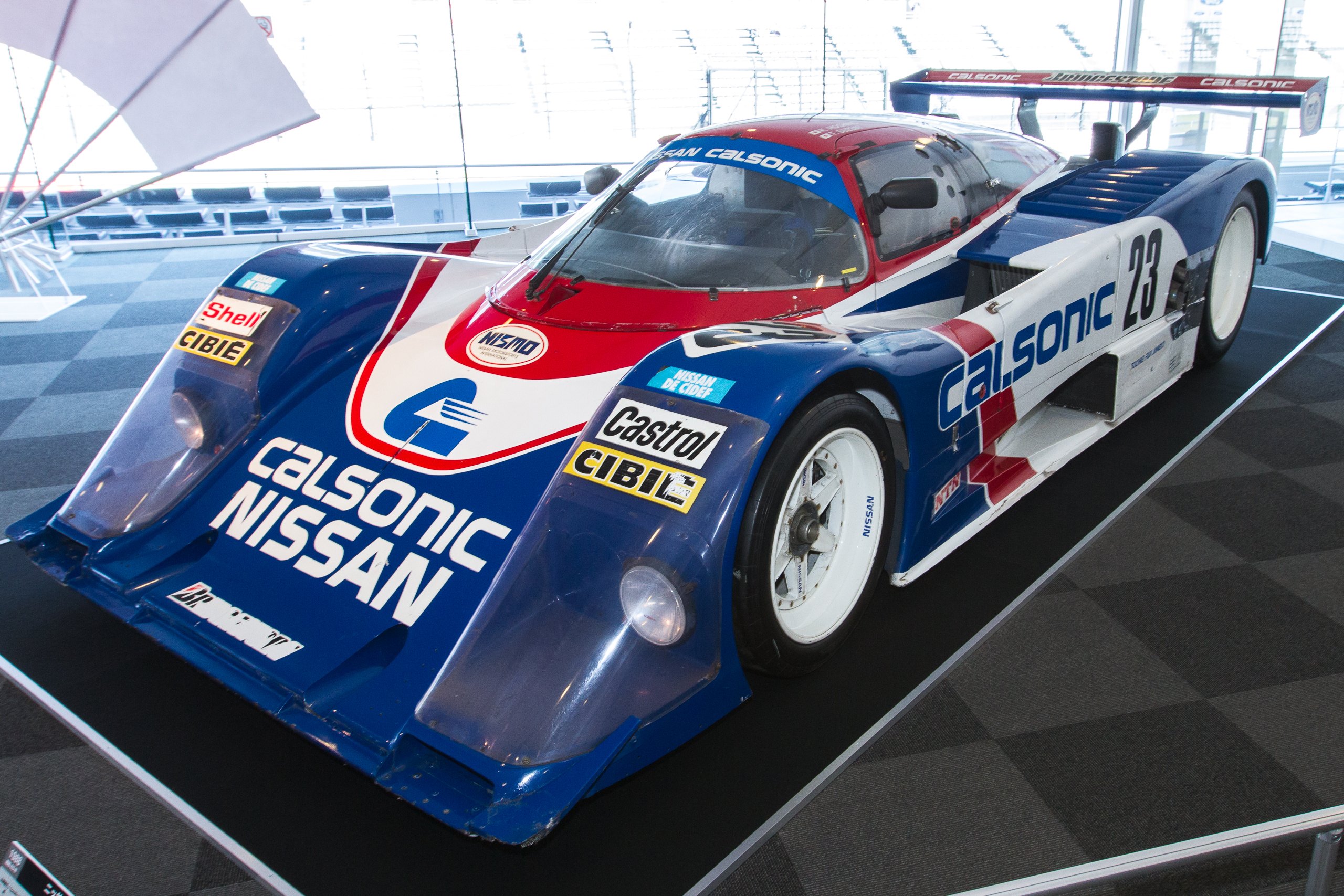
The Nissan R88C being displayed at the Nismo Motorsport Facility at the Suzuka International Racing Course in 2012.

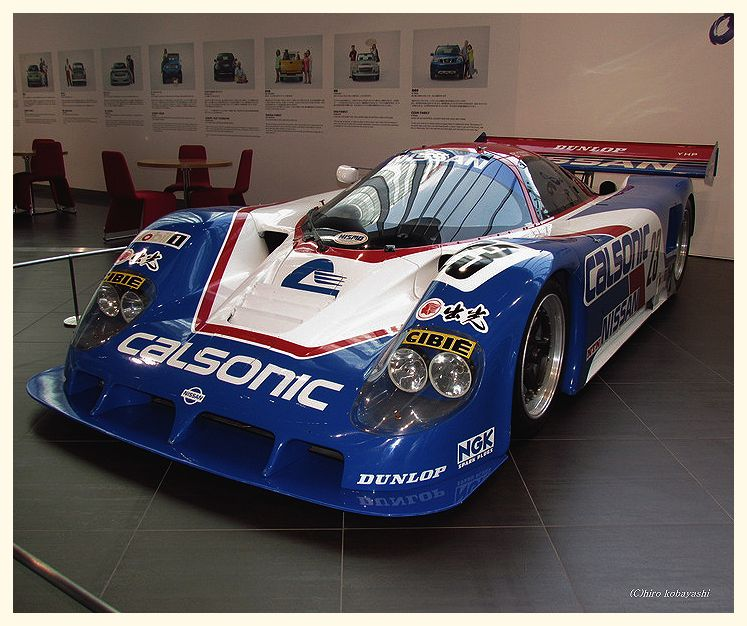
The Nissan R89C which won the 1989 24 Hours of Fuji and is displayed at Nissan's Omori Factory

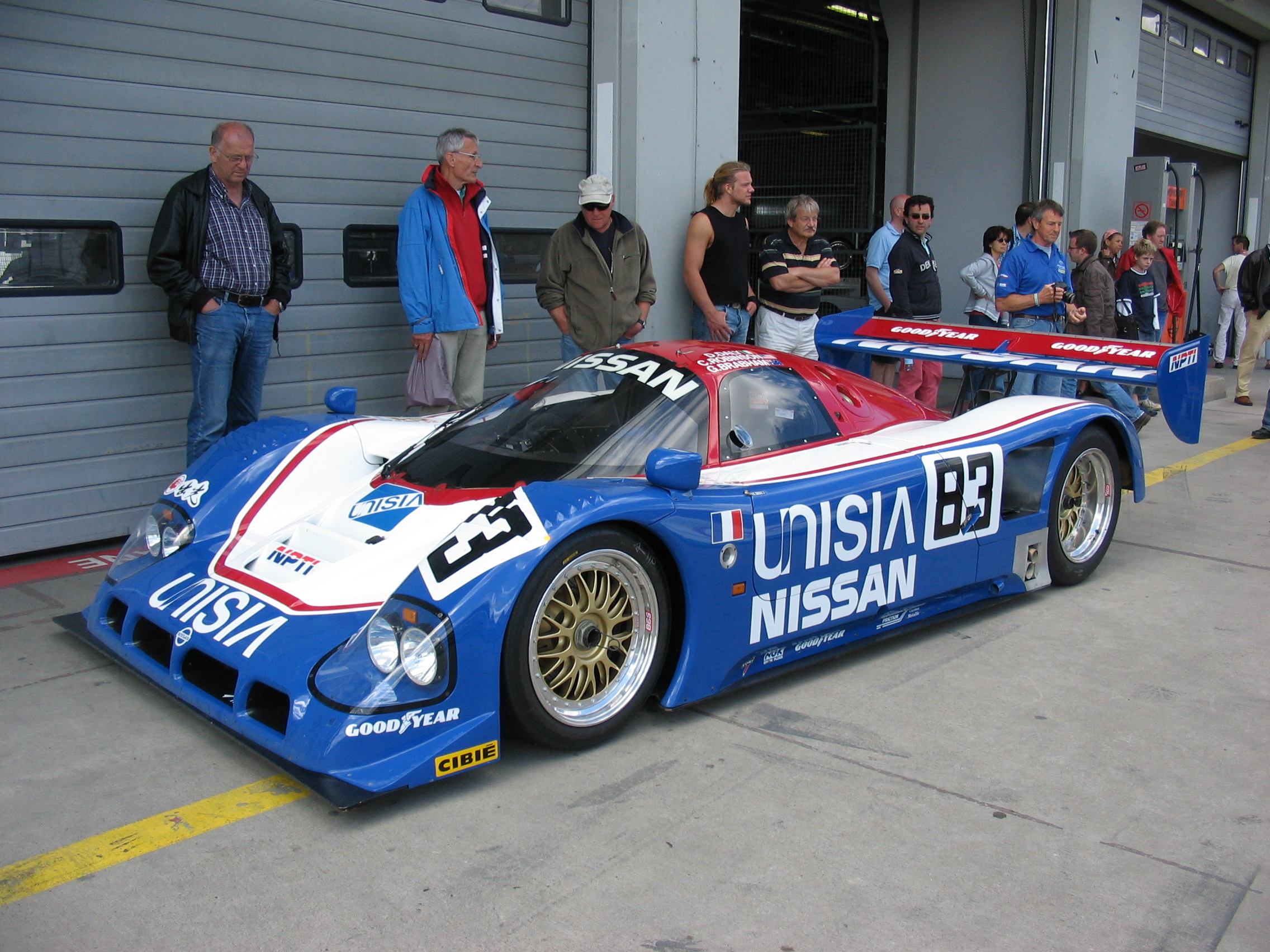
A Nissan R90CK at DAMC 05 Oldtimer Festival Nürburgring in June 2007.

In the 1980s and 1990s, Nissan raced at the All Japan Sports Prototype Championship and 24 Hours of Le Mans with sports prototypes such as the R88C, R89C, R90C and R391. They claimed the 1990, 1991 and 1992 JSPC titles, but they never won at Le Mans. Notable Nissan drivers in this era include Masahiro Hasemi, Kazuyoshi Hoshino, Masahiko Kageyama and Toshio Suzuki.

== Touring Car Racing ==
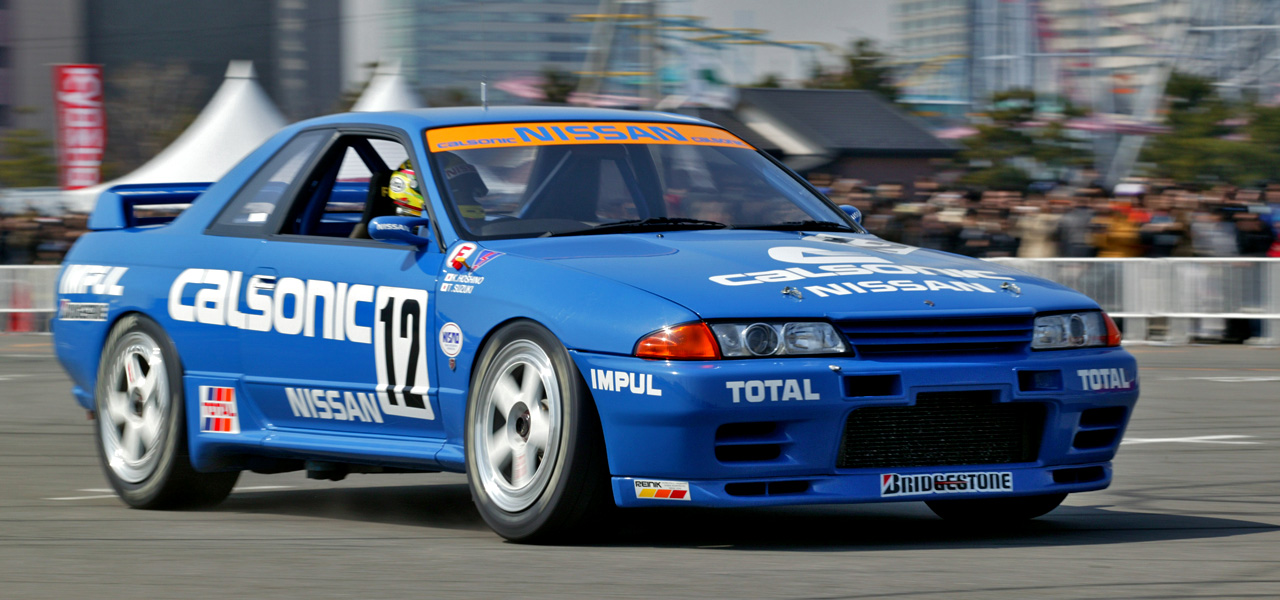
The CALSONIC R32 GT-R from the Group A series

In the 1980s, the manufacturer entered the Fuji Grand Champion Series with Group 5 Bluebird, Skyline and Silvia silhouettes and the Japanese Touring Car Championship with production Skyline models. In the 1990s, Nissan competed in Supertouring championships around the world with the Nissan Primera, winning the 1999 British Touring Car Championship with Laurent Aïello.

== Supercars Championship ==
From 2013 onwards Nissan competed in the Supercars Championship with Kelly Racing fielding four Nissan Altimas. The factory backing concluded at the end of 2018, although the Altimas continued to be privately entered in 2019.

== International GT Racing ==
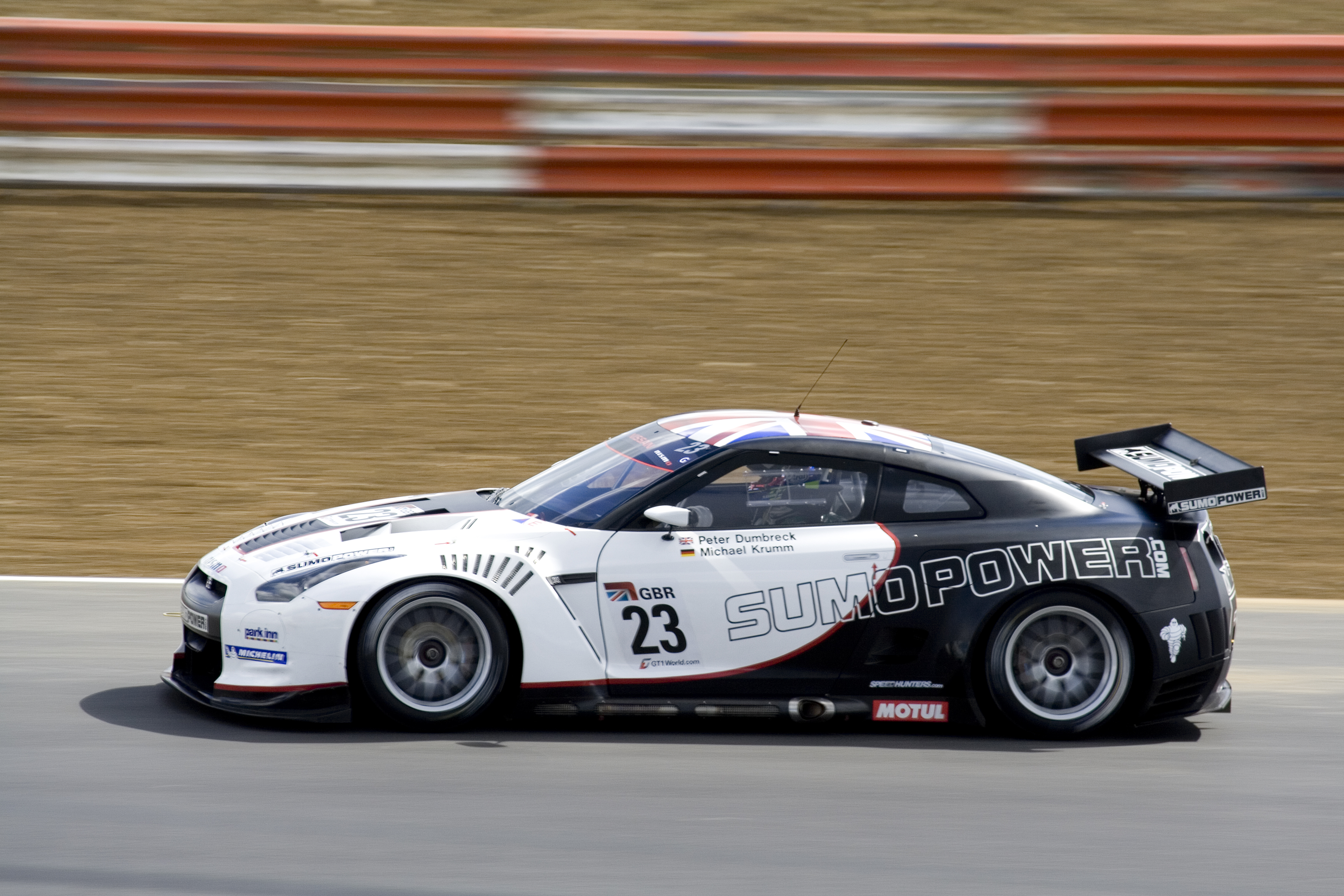
A Nissan GT-R entered by Sumo Power GT in the FIA GT1 World Championship

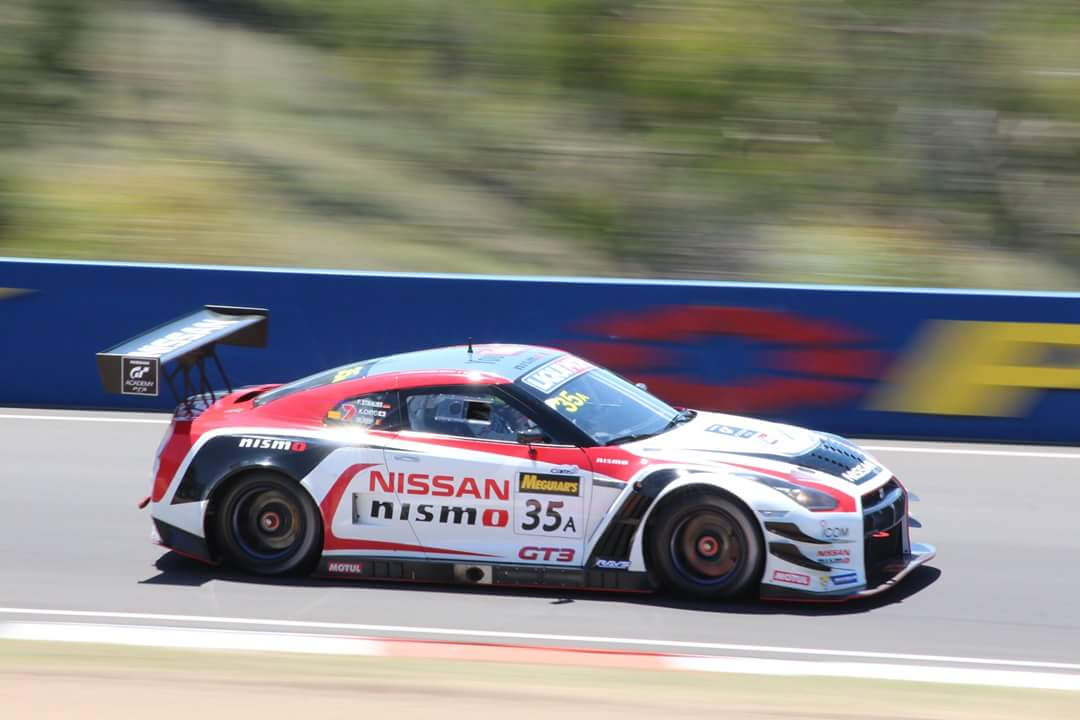
Alex Buncombe, Katsumasa Chiyo and Wolfgang Reip won the Series Championship in a Nissan GT-R Nismo GT3.

In 2009, Nissan entered the FIA GT1 World Championship with a Nismo-developed Nissan GT-R. Krumm and Lucas Luhr were 2011 drivers champions. Since 2011, Nismo has produced the GT-R GT3, which has competed in the Blancpain Endurance Series. Nismo has also developed production class Nissan GT-R cars for the 24 Hours of Nürburgring.

They also have a pool of drivers, known as the Nismo Global Driver Exchange. This allows factory drivers the chance to race in big events such as the Le Mans 24 Hours, the 24 Hours of Dubai and the Bathurst 12 Hour.

== Prototype racing ==
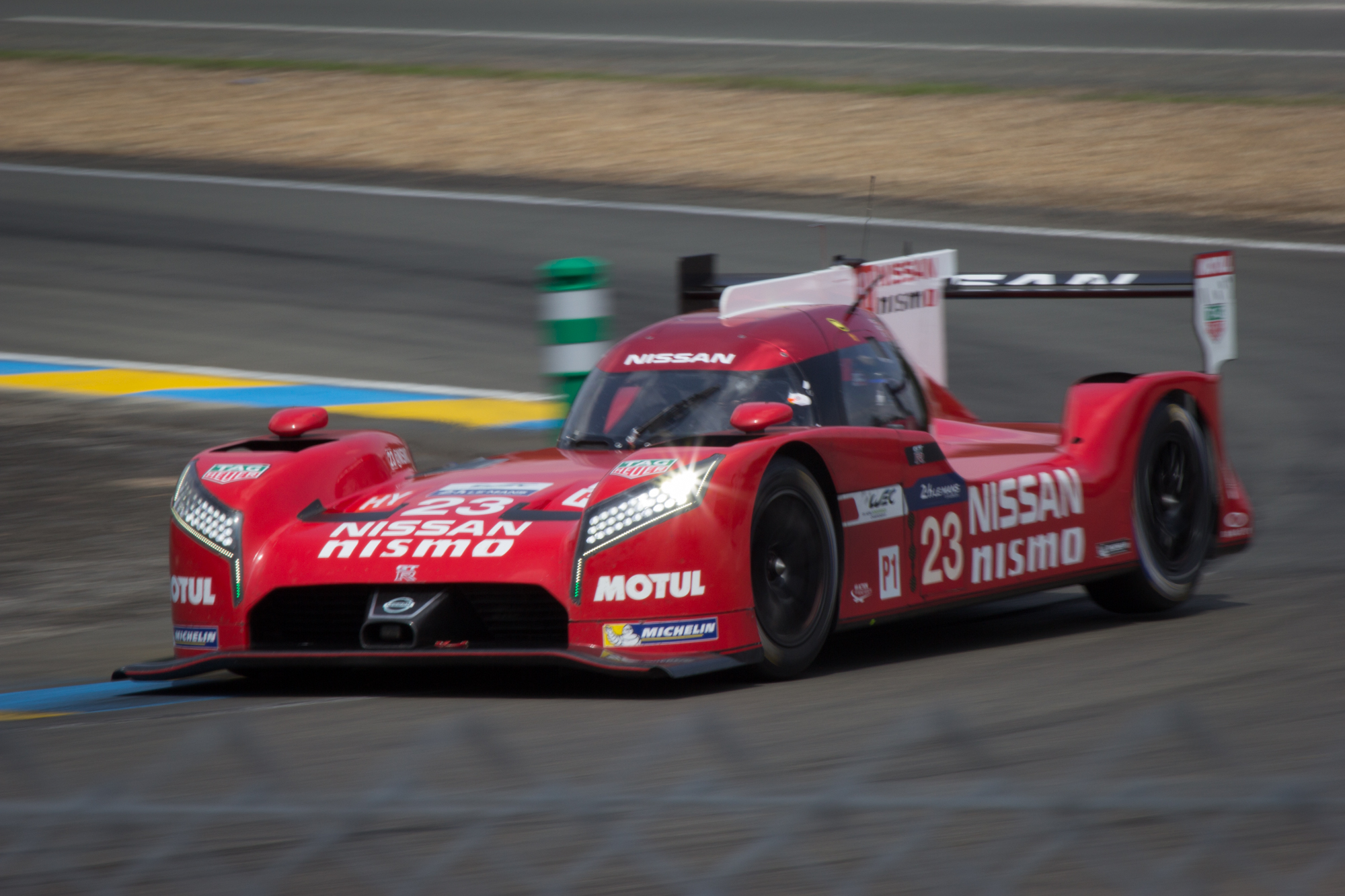
The No. 23 Nissan GT-R LM Nismo at the 2015 24 Hours of Le Mans

Nissan's first LMP1 Hybrid was unsuccessful and caused Nissan and Nismo to withdraw from Le Mans entirely.

From 2011 to 2016, Nissan was involved in the FIA World Endurance Championship and European Le Mans Series as a LMP2 engine supplier. They have had success with Greaves Motorsport, Signature Team, OAK Racing, TDS Racing, G-Drive Racing and SMP Racing. In 2017, Nissan entered the DPi class of the WeatherTech SportsCar Championship with Extreme Speed Motorsports.

Nissan announced in June 2014, that Nismo will enter the LMP1 category to fight for the FIA World Endurance Championship against Audi, Toyota and Porsche. Following a disappointing performance in the 2015 24 Hours of Le Mans, the program's remaining schedule in 2015 was pushed back, with the team intending a regular rebut in the 2016 season; however on 22 December 2015, Nissan announced that it was shuttering the program altogether.

== Formula E ==
In the inaugural season of Formula E, DAMS (as e.dams) partnered with sister company Renault to form Team e.dams Renault, where they became the first Formula E Team's Champion. At the end of the 2017–18 season, Renault decided to focus on Formula One with Nissan taking over Renault's place in the partnership with e.dams to form Nissan e.dams for the 2018–19 season. In April 2022, Nissan announced the acquisition of the e.dams race team and entered the 2022–23 season as Nissan Formula E Team. As of 2026, it is the only international racing series where Nissan and Nismo are competing. The Team won the Drivers' Championship in the 2024–25 season with Oliver Rowland. The current drivers for the Nissan Formula E Team are race drivers Oliver Rowland and Norman Nato and test drivers Abbi Pulling and Sam Bird.

== Current teams ==
=== Super GT ===
==== GT500 ====
- Nismo
- Impul
- Kondo Racing

==== GT300 ====
- HELM Motorsports
- Kondo Racing
- NILZZ Racing
- Tomei Sports
- Gainer

=== FIA Formula E ===
- Nissan Formula E Team

== Current factory drivers ==
- (Japan) Katsumasa Chiyo
- (Japan) Tsugio Matsuda
- (Japan) Ryuichiro Tomita
- (Japan) Masataka Yanagida
- (Japan) Mitsunori Takaboshi
- (Japan) Kohei Hirate
- (Japan) Keishi Ishikawa
- (Belgium) Bertrand Baguette
- (Japan) Daiki Sasaki
- (Japan) Atsushi Miyake
- (United Kingdom) Oliver Rowland
- (France) Norman Nato

== Racecars ==
Year	Car	Category
1968	Nissan R381	Group 7
1969	Nissan R382	Group 7
1970	Nissan R383	Group 7
1983	Nissan LM03C	Group C
1983	Nissan Skyline Turbo C	Group C
1984	Nissan LM04C	Group C
1985	Nissan GTP ZX-Turbo	IMSA GTP
1986	Nissan R86V	Group C
1987	Nissan 300ZX	IMSA GTU
1987	Nissan R87E	Group C
1988	Nissan R88C	Group C
1989	Nissan R89C	Group C
1990	Nissan NPT-90	IMSA GTP
1990	Nissan R90CK/CP	Group C
1991	Nissan R91CK/CP/VP	Group C
1992	Nissan P35	Group C
1992	Nissan R92CP	Group C
1995	Nissan Primera HP10	Super Touring
1995	Nissan Pulsar FN14	Super Touring
1995	Nissan Sunny FB14	Super Touring
1996	Nissan Primera HP11	Super Touring
1997	Nissan R390 GT1	Group GT1
1999	Nissan R391	LMP900
2000	Nissan Sunny P11	Super Touring
2005	Nissan Fairlady Z GT500 (Z33)	GT500
2007	Nissan 350Z RJN	SRO GT4
2007	Nissan Navara Double Cab D40	Group T2
2008	Nissan Fairlady Z (Z33)	GT300
2008	Nissan GT-R GT500	GT500
2008	Nissan Pathfinder R51	Group T2
2009	Nissan 370Z Nismo GT4	SRO GT4
2009	Nissan GT-R GT1	Group GT1
2012	DeltaWing LM12	Experimental
2012	Nissan GT-R Nismo GT3	Group GT3
2014	Nissan GT-R NISMO GT500	GT500
2014	Nissan Patrol Y62	Group T2
2014	Nissan ZEOD RC	Experimental
2015	Nissan GT-R LM Nismo	LMP1
2017	Ligier Nissan DPi	DPi
2018	Nissan GT-R Nismo GT3	Group GT3
2018	Nissan IM01	Formula E
2019	Nissan IM02	Formula E
2021	Nissan IM03	Formula E
2022	Nissan e-4ORCE 04	Formula E
2022	Nissan Fairlady Z NISMO GT500	GT500
2024	Nissan e-4ORCE 05	Formula E
2024	Nissan Fairlady Z (RZ34)	GT300
2024	Nissan Z Nismo GT4	SRO GT4

== Racing results ==
=== 24 Hours of Le Mans results ===
Year	Entrant	No.	Tyres	Car	Drivers	Class	Laps	Pos.	Class Pos.
1986	(Japan) Nissan Motorsport	23	B	Nissan R86V	(Japan) Kazuyoshi Hoshino (Japan) Keiji Matsumoto (Japan) Aguri Suzuki	C1	64	DNF	DNF
1986	(Japan) Nissan Motorsport	32	D	Nissan R85V	(Japan) Masahiro Hasemi (Japan) Takao Wada (United Kingdom) James Weaver	C1	285	16th	10th
1987	(Japan) Nissan Motorsports	23	B	Nissan R87E	(Japan) Kazuyoshi Hoshino (Japan) Keiji Matsumoto (Japan) Kenji Takahashi	C1	181	DNF	DNF
1987	(Japan) Nissan Motorsports	32	D	Nissan R87E	(Japan) Masahiro Hasemi (Japan) Takao Wada (Japan) Aguri Suzuki	C1	117	DNF	DNF
1988	(Japan) Nissan Motorsports	23	B	Nissan R88C	(Japan) Kazuyoshi Hoshino (Japan) Takao Wada (Japan) Aguri Suzuki	C1	286	DNF	DNF
1988	(Japan) Nissan Motorsports	32	B	Nissan R88C	(United Kingdom) Win Percy (Australia) Allan Grice (United Kingdom) Mike Wilds	C1	344	14th	13th
1989	(Japan) Nissan Motorsport	23	D	Nissan R89C	(Japan) Masahiro Hasemi (Japan) Kazuyoshi Hoshino (Japan) Toshio Suzuki	C1	167	DNF	DNF
1989	(Japan) Nissan Motorsport	24	D	Nissan R89C	(United Kingdom) Julian Bailey (United Kingdom) Mark Blundell (United Kingdom) Martin Donnelly	C1	5	DNF	DNF
1989	(Japan) Nissan Motorsport	25	D	Nissan R89C	(Australia) Geoff Brabham (United States) Chip Robinson (Netherlands) Arie Luyendyk	C1	250	DNF	DNF
1990	(Japan) Nissan Motorsports	23	D	Nissan R90CP	(Japan) Masahiro Hasemi (Japan) Kazuyoshi Hoshino (Japan) Toshio Suzuki	C1	348	5th	5th
1990	(United Kingdom) Nissan Motorsports Europe	24	D	Nissan R90CK	(United Kingdom) Julian Bailey (United Kingdom) Mark Blundell (Italy) Gianfranco Brancatelli	C1	142	DNF	DNF
1990	(United Kingdom) Nissan Motorsports Europe	25	D	Nissan R90CK	(United Kingdom) Kenny Acheson (United Kingdom) Martin Donnelly (France) Olivier Grouillard	C1	0	DNS	DNS
1990	(United States) Nissan Performance Technology	83	G	Nissan R90CK	(Australia) Geoff Brabham (United States) Chip Robinson (Republic of Ireland) Derek Daly	C1	251	DNF	DNF
1990	(United States) Nissan Performance Technology	84	G	Nissan R90CK	(New Zealand) Steve Millen (Republic of Ireland) Michael Roe (United States) Bob Earl	C1	311	17th	17th
1995	(Japan) NISMO	22	B	Nissan Skyline GT-R LM	(Japan) Hideo Fukuyama (Japan) Masahiko Kondo (Japan) Shunji Kasuya	GT1	271	10th	4th
1995	(Japan) NISMO	23	B	Nissan Skyline GT-R LM	(Japan) Kazuyoshi Hoshino (Japan) Toshio Suzuki (Japan) Masahiko Kageyama	GT1	157	DNF	DNF
1996	(Japan) NISMO	22	B	Nissan Skyline GT-R LM	(Japan) Aguri Suzuki (Japan) Masahiko Kageyama (Japan) Masahiko Kondo	GT1	209	DNF	DNF
1996	(Japan) NISMO	23	B	Nissan Skyline GT-R LM	(Japan) Kazuyoshi Hoshino (Japan) Toshio Suzuki (Japan) Masahiro Hasemi	GT1	307	15th	10th
1997	(Japan) Nissan Motorsports (United Kingdom) Tom Walkinshaw Racing	21	B	Nissan R390 GT1	(United Kingdom) Martin Brundle (Germany) Jörg Müller (South Africa) Wayne Taylor	GT1	139	DNF	DNF
1997	(Japan) Nissan Motorsports (United Kingdom) Tom Walkinshaw Racing	22	B	Nissan R390 GT1	(Italy) Riccardo Patrese (Belgium) Eric van de Poele (Japan) Aguri Suzuki	GT1	121	DNF	DNF
1997	(Japan) Nissan Motorsports (United Kingdom) Tom Walkinshaw Racing	23	B	Nissan R390 GT1	(Japan) Kazuyoshi Hoshino (Japan) Masahiko Kageyama (France) Érik Comas	GT1	294	12th	5th
1998	(Japan) Nissan Motorsports (United Kingdom) Tom Walkinshaw Racing	30	B	Nissan R390 GT1	(Denmark) John Nielsen (Germany) Michael Krumm (France) Franck Lagorce	GT1	342	5th	5th
1998	(Japan) Nissan Motorsports (United Kingdom) Tom Walkinshaw Racing	31	B	Nissan R390 GT1	(Netherlands) Jan Lammers (France) Érik Comas (Italy) Andrea Montermini	GT1	342	6th	6th
1998	(Japan) Nissan Motorsports (United Kingdom) Tom Walkinshaw Racing	32	B	Nissan R390 GT1	(Japan) Kazuyoshi Hoshino (Japan) Masahiko Kageyama (Japan) Aguri Suzuki	GT1	348	3rd	3rd
1998	(Japan) Nissan Motorsports (United Kingdom) Tom Walkinshaw Racing	33	B	Nissan R390 GT1	(Japan) Satoshi Motoyama (Japan) Takuya Kurosawa (Japan) Masami Kageyama	GT1	319	10th	9th
1999	(Japan) Nissan Motorsports (France) Courage Compétition	21	B	Courage C52	(France) Didier Cottaz (Belgium) Marc Goossens (Sweden) Fredrik Ekblom	LMP	335	8th	7th
1999	(Japan) Nissan Motorsports	22	B	Nissan R391	(Germany) Michael Krumm (Japan) Satoshi Motoyama (France) Érik Comas	LMP	110	DNF	DNF
1999	(Japan) Nissan Motorsports	23	B	Nissan R391	(Japan) Aguri Suzuki (Japan) Masami Kageyama (Belgium) Eric van de Poele	LMP	0	DNS	DNS
2015	(Japan) Nissan Motorsports	21	M	Nissan GT-R LM Nismo	(Japan) Tsugio Matsuda (Spain) Lucas Ordóñez (Russia) Mark Shulzhitskiy	LMP1	115	DNF	DNF
2015	(Japan) Nissan Motorsports	22	M	Nissan GT-R LM Nismo	(United Kingdom) Harry Tincknell (United Kingdom) Alex Buncombe (Germany) Michael Krumm	LMP1	242	NC	NC
2015	(Japan) Nissan Motorsports	23	M	Nissan GT-R LM Nismo	(United Kingdom) Max Chilton (United Kingdom) Jann Mardenborough (France) Olivier Pla	LMP1	234	DNF	DNF

=== Complete All-Japan Sports Prototype Championship (JSPC) results ===
(key) (Races in bold indicate pole position) (Races in italics indicate fastest lap)

Year	Car	Tyres	Class	No.	Drivers	1	2	3	4	5	6	7	Man.	Pts
1987	Nissan R86V; Nissan R87E	**D** **B**	C LD1	23	(Japan) Kazuyoshi Hoshino (Japan) Kenji Takahashi (United Kingdom) Dave Scott	SUZ; Ret	FUJ; 8	FUJ; Ret	SUZ; 6	FUJ; 12	FUJ; Ret		4th	22
1987	Nissan R86V; Nissan R87E	**D** **B**	C LD1	32	(Japan) Masahiro Hasemi (Japan) Aguri Suzuki	SUZ; 8	**FUJ**; Ret	FUJ; Ret	SUZ; 11	FUJ; Ret	FUJ; 8		4th	22
1988	Nissan R88C	**B**	C LD1	23	(Japan) Kazuyoshi Hoshino (Japan) Kenji Takahashi (United Kingdom) Win Percy (Japan) Toshio Suzuki (Australia) Allan Grice	FUJ; Ret	SUZ; 6	FUJ; 7	FUJ; 5	SUZ; Ret	FUJ; 9		2nd	36
1988	Nissan R88C	**B**	C LD1	32	(Japan) Masahiro Hasemi (Japan) Aguri Suzuki (Australia) Allan Grice	FUJ; Ret	SUZ; 8	FUJ; 8	**FUJ**; 3	SUZ; 3	FUJ; 11		2nd	36
1989	Nissan R88C; Nissan R89C	**D** **B**	C1	23	(Japan) Kazuyoshi Hoshino (Japan) Toshio Suzuki	FUJ; Ret	FUJ; 6	FUJ; Ret	SUZ; DNS	FUJ; Ret			3rd	24
1989	Nissan R88C; Nissan R89C	**D** **B**	C1	24	(Japan) Masahiro Hasemi (Sweden) Anders Olofsson	FUJ; 8	**FUJ**; 3	**FUJ**; Ret	SUZ; 10	FUJ; 8			3rd	24
1990	Nissan R90CP	**D** **B**	C1	23	(Japan) Kazuyoshi Hoshino (Japan) Toshio Suzuki	FUJ; 4	FUJ; C	FUJ; 3	SUZ; 1	SUG; 4	FUJ; 2		1st	90
1990	Nissan R90CP	**D** **B**	C1	24	(Japan) Masahiro Hasemi (Sweden) Anders Olofsson	FUJ; 2	FUJ; C	**FUJ**; 1	SUZ; 7	SUG; 1	**FUJ**; 5		1st	90
1991	Nissan R90CP; Nissan R91CP	**B**	C1	1	(Japan) Masahiro Hasemi (Sweden) Anders Olofsson	FUJ; 9	**FUJ**; 2	FUJ; Ret	SUZ; 3	SUG; 3	FUJ; Ret	SUG; 4	1st	117
1991	Nissan R90CP; Nissan R91CP	**B**	C1	23	(Japan) Kazuyoshi Hoshino (Japan) Toshio Suzuki	**FUJ**; 1	FUJ; 1	FUJ; 2	SUZ; Ret	SUG; 11	FUJ; 1	SUG; 3	1st	117
1992	Nissan R92CP	**B**	C1; LD2	1	(Japan) Kazuyoshi Hoshino (Japan) Toshio Suzuki (Japan) Takao Wada	SUZ; 9	**FUJ**; 1	FUJ; 1	SUG; 1	FUJ; 1	**MIN**; 1		1st	120
1992	Nissan R92CP	**B**	C1; LD2	24	(Japan) Masahiro Hasemi (Japan) Masahiko Kageyama (United States) Jeff Krosnoff	**SUZ**; 1	FUJ; 4	**FUJ**; 5	**SUG**; 4	FUJ; 4	MIN; 4		1st	120
1992	Nissan NP35	**G**	C LD1	23	(Japan) Toshio Suzuki (United States) Jeff Krosnoff	SUZ	FUJ	FUJ	SUG	FUJ	MIN; 4		3rd	10

=== Japanese Grand Touring Championship (JGTC) ===
(key) (Races in bold indicate pole position) (Races in italics indicate fastest lap)

Year	Car	Tyres	Class	No.	Drivers	1	2	3	4	5	6	7	8	9	Pos	Pts
1993	Nissan Skyline GT-R (R32)	B	GT1; GT; GT-N3	2	(Japan) Masahiko Kageyama (United States) Jeff Krosnoff	FUJ; 1	**FUJ**; 1	**SUZ**; 1	**FUJ**; 1						N/A	N/A
1993	Nissan Silvia (S13)	Y	GT2; GT	3	(Japan) Takayuki Kinoshita (Japan) Hideo Fukuyama	FUJ; 2	FUJ; 2	SUZ	**FUJ**; 1						N/A	N/A
1994	Nissan Skyline GT-R (R32)	B	GT1	2	(Japan) Toshio Suzuki	FUJ; Ret	SEN; 6	FUJ; 6	SUG; 2	MIN; Ret					5th	27
1994	Nissan Skyline GT-R (R32)	B	GT1	10	(Japan) Akira Iida (Japan) Eiji Yamada	FUJ; Ret	SEN; 5	FUJ; 8	SUG; 6	MIN; 9					6th	19
1995	Nissan Skyline GT-R (R33)	B	GT1	10	(Japan) Akira Iida (Japan) Toshio Suzuki	SUZ	FUJ	SEN	FUJ; 3	SUG; 9	MIN; Ret				4th	58
1995	Nissan Skyline GT-R (R33)	B	GT1	55	(Japan) Toshio Suzuki (Japan) Akira Iida	SUZ; 2	FUJ; 4	SEN; 6	FUJ; 2	SUG; 5	MIN; 7				4th	58
1996	Nissan Skyline GT-R (R33)	B	GT500	2	(Japan) Aguri Suzuki (Japan) Hideo Fukuyama	SUZ; 4	FUJ; Ret	SEN; 7	FUJ; 3	SUG; 5	MIN; 3	NC1; 3			4th	50
1996	Nissan Skyline GT-R (R33)	B	GT500	556	(Japan) Toshio Suzuki (Japan) Masahiko Kondo	SUZ; 6	FUJ; Ret	SEN; 17	FUJ; 5	SUG; 3	MIN; 10	**NC1**; 10			4th	50
1997	Nissan Skyline GT-R (R33)	B	GT500	2	(Japan) Aguri Suzuki (France) Érik Comas (Italy) Marco Apicella	SUZ; 1	FUJ; 4	SEN; 2	FUJ; 10	MIN; 9	SUG; 3	**NC1**; 1	NC2; 1		3rd	61
1997	Nissan Skyline GT-R (R33)	B	GT500	556	(Japan) Masahiko Kageyama (Japan) Masahiko Kondo	SUZ; 5	FUJ; Ret	SEN; 14	FUJ; 9	MIN; Ret	SUG; Ret	NC1; Ret	NC2; 7		3rd	61
1998	Nissan Skyline GT-R (R33)	B	GT500	2	(Japan) Masahiko Kageyama (Japan) Aguri Suzuki (Spain) Pedro de la Rosa	SUZ; Ret	FUJ; C	SEN; 2	FUJ; 7	MOT; 11	MIN; 5	SUG; 9	NC1; Ret		1st	70
1998	Nissan Skyline GT-R (R33)	B	GT500	23	(Japan) Masami Kageyama (France) Érik Comas (Republic of Ireland) Ralph Firman	SUZ; 1	FUJ; C	SEN; 1	FUJ; 10	MOT; 4	MIN; 4	SUG; 6	NC1; 10		1st	70
1998	Nissan Silvia (S14)	B	GT300	15	(Japan) Masahiko Kondo (Japan) Takayuki Aoki	SUZ; 4	FUJ; C	**SEN**; 2	FUJ; NC	MOT; 14	MIN; Ret	SUG; 4	NC1; 3		6th	35
1999	Nissan Skyline GT-R (R34)	B	GT500	1	(France) Érik Comas (Japan) Satoshi Motoyama (Sweden) Anders Olofsson	SUZ; 2	FUJ; 5	SUG; 6	MIN; 1	FUJ; 3	OKA; 7	MOT; 3	NC1; 4		2nd	91
1999	Nissan Skyline GT-R (R34)	B	GT500	2	(Japan) Aguri Suzuki (Germany) Michael Krumm (Germany) Armin Hahne	SUZ; 5	FUJ; 11	SUG; 9	MIN; 12	FUJ; 12	OKA; 2	MOT; 2	NC1; 3		2nd	91
1999	Nissan Silvia (S15)	Y	GT300	15	(Japan) Takeshi Tsuchiya (Japan) Yuji Ide	SUZ; 9	**FUJ**; Ret	**SUG**; 1	MIN; 1	FUJ; NC	**OKA**; 1	MOT; 4	NC1; 3		2nd	72
2000	Nissan Skyline GT-R (R34)	B	GT500	1	(France) Érik Comas (Japan) Masami Kageyama	MOT; 1	FUJ; 6	SUG; Ret	NC1; 7	FUJ; 4	OKA; 3	MIN; 3	SUZ; 5		2nd	79
2000	Nissan Skyline GT-R (R34)	B	GT500	2	(Germany) Michael Krumm (Japan) Yuji Ide (Japan) Ukyo Katayama	MOT; 6	FUJ; 2	SUG; 11	NC1; 1	FUJ; 6	OKA; 11	MIN; Ret	SUZ; 4		2nd	79
2001	Nissan Skyline GT-R (R34)	B	GT500	22	(Germany) Michael Krumm (Japan) Tetsuya Tanaka	OKA; 4	FUJ; 3	SUG; Ret	NC1; 3	FUJ; 1	MOT; 10	SUZ; 8	MIN; 6		1st	71
2001	Nissan Skyline GT-R (R34)	B	GT500	23	(France) Érik Comas (Japan) Masami Kageyama	OKA; 13	FUJ; 4	SUG; 10	NC1; 4	FUJ; 2	MOT; Ret	SUZ; 3	MIN; 2		1st	71
2002	Nissan Skyline GT-R (R34)	B	GT500	22	(Germany) Michael Krumm (Japan) Satoshi Motoyama	OKA; 11	FUJ; 7	SUG; 7	SEP; 4	FUJ; 2	MOT; 10	MIN; 2	SUZ; Ret		7th	62
2002	Nissan Skyline GT-R (R34)	B	GT500	23	(France) Érik Comas (Japan) Masami Kageyama	OKA; 12	FUJ; 6	SUG; 4	SEP; 15	FUJ; 14	MOT; 17	MIN; Ret	SUZ; 8		7th	62
2003	Nissan Skyline GT-R (R34)	B	GT500	22	(Japan) Masami Kageyama (United Kingdom) Richard Lyons	OKA; 8	FUJ; 1	SUG; 5	FUJ; 2	FUJ; 11	MOT; 13	AUT; 6	SUZ; 6		1st	106
2003	Nissan Skyline GT-R (R34)	B	GT500	23	(Germany) Michael Krumm (Japan) Satoshi Motoyama	**OKA**; 2	FUJ; 4	SUG; 3	FUJ; 5	FUJ; 2	MOT; 11	AUT; 5	SUZ; 3		1st	106
2004	Nissan Fairlady Z	B	GT500	1	(United Kingdom) Richard Lyons (Japan) Satoshi Motoyama	OKA; 1	SUG; DNS	SEP; 3	TOK; Ret	MOT; 3	AUT; 1	SUZ; 7	**NC1**; Ret	**NC2**; DNS	1st	98
2004	Nissan Fairlady Z	B	GT500	22	(Germany) Michael Krumm (Japan) Masami Kageyama	**OKA**; 9	SUG; Ret	SEP; 6	TOK; 1	MOT; 8	AUT; 9	SUZ; Ret	NC1; Ret	NC2; DNS	1st	98

=== Complete Super GT Results ===
(key) (Races in bold indicate pole position) (Races in italics indicate fastest lap)

Year	Car	Tyres	Class	No.	Drivers	1	2	3	4	5	6	7	8	9	10	Pos	Points
2005	Nissan Fairlady Z	B	GT500	1	(United Kingdom) Richard Lyons (Japan) Satoshi Motoyama	OKA; Ret	FUJ; 4	SEP; 1	SUG; 8	MOT; 6	FUJ; 10	AUT; 6	SUZ; 2			1st	86
2005	Nissan Fairlady Z	B	GT500	22	(Germany) Michael Krumm (Japan) Masataka Yanagida	**OKA**; 12	FUJ; 2	SEP; 6	SUG; 7	MOT; 4	FUJ; 9	AUT; 2	SUZ; 8			1st	86
2006	Nissan Fairlady Z	B	GT500	22	(Germany) Michael Krumm (Japan) Sakon Yamamoto (United Kingdom) Richard Lyons (Brazil) Fabio Carbone	SUZ; 12	OKA; 3	FUJ; 9	SEP; 2	SUG; 3	SUZ; 2	MOT; 10	AUT; 6	FUJ; 6		2nd	70
2006	Nissan Fairlady Z	B	GT500	23	(Japan) Tsugio Matsuda (Japan) Satoshi Motoyama (Japan) Yuji Ide	SUZ; 2	OKA; Ret	FUJ; 4	SEP; 5	SUG; 2	SUZ; DSQ	MOT; 14	AUT; 1	FUJ; 11		4th	64
2007	Nissan Fairlady Z	B	GT500	22	(Germany) Michael Krumm (Japan) Tsugio Matsuda	SUZ; 5	OKA; 3	FUJ; 2	SEP; 10	SUG; Ret	SUZ; 6	MOT; 2	AUT; 4	FUJ; 9		2nd	85
2007	Nissan Fairlady Z	B	GT500	23	(Japan) Satoshi Motoyama (United Kingdom) Richard Lyons (Japan) Hironobu Yasuda	SUZ; 2	OKA; Ret	FUJ; 1	SEP; 14	SUG; Ret	SUZ; 3	MOT; 13	AUT; 11	FUJ; 14		8th	60
2008	Nissan GT-R GT500	B	GT500	22	(Germany) Michael Krumm (Japan) Masataka Yanagida (Germany) Dominik Schwager	**SUZ**; 2	OKA; 15	FUJ; 12	**SEP**; 2	SUG; 13	SUZ; 4	MOT; 7	AUT; 5	FUJ; 11		6th	69
2008	Nissan GT-R GT500	B	GT500	23	(Japan) Satoshi Motoyama (France) Benoît Tréluyer (Brazil) Fabio Carbone	SUZ; 1	**OKA**; 1	FUJ; 14	SEP; 13	SUG; 14	SUZ; 8	MOT; 12	**AUT**; 1	FUJ; 9		3rd	86
2009	Nissan GT-R GT500	B	GT500	1	(Japan) Satoshi Motoyama (France) Benoît Tréluyer (Germany) Michael Krumm	OKA; 13	**SUZ**; 11	**FUJ**; 1	**SEP**; 8	SUG; 1	SUZ; 6	FUJ; 2	AUT; 2	MOT; 14		3rd	101
2010	Nissan GT-R GT500	M	GT500	23	(Japan) Satoshi Motoyama (France) Benoît Tréluyer	SUZ; 8	OKA; Ret	FUJ; Ret	SEP; 2	**SUG**; 6	SUZ; 2	FUJ; C	MOT; 8	NC1; 5	NC2; 6	8th	56
2011	Nissan GT-R GT500	B	GT500	23	(Japan) Satoshi Motoyama (France) Benoît Tréluyer	OKA; 5	FUJ; 1	SEP; 14	SUG; 12	SUZ; 4	FUJ; 6	AUT; 1	MOT; 1	NC1; 12	NC2; 11	2nd	102
2012	Nissan GT-R GT3	Y	GT300	3	(Japan) Yuhi Sekiguchi (Japan) Katsumasa Chiyo (Japan) Daiki Sasaki	OKA; 19	FUJ; 18	SEP; 4	SUG; 1	SUZ; 2	FUJ; 9	**AUT**; 19	MOT; 6	NC1; 4	NC2; 19	5th	71
2012	Nissan GT-R GT500	B	GT500	23	(Japan) Satoshi Motoyama (Germany) Michael Krumm	OKA; 4	FUJ; 3	SEP; 8	SUG; Ret	SUZ; 5	FUJ; 11	AUT; 6	MOT; 6	NC1; 4	NC2; 4	6th	61
2013	Nissan GT-R GT3	Y	GT300	3	(Japan) Kazuki Hoshino (Japan) Daiki Sasaki (Spain) Lucas Ordóñez	OKA; Ret	FUJ; Ret	SEP; 10	SUG; 9	SUZ; 9	FUJ; 5	**AUT**; Ret	MOT; 9	**NC1**; 1	**NC2**; 7	14th	23
2013	Nissan GT-R GT3	Y	GT300	35	(United Kingdom) Alex Buncombe (Spain) Lucas Ordóñez	OKA	FUJ	SEP	SUG	SUZ	FUJ	AUT	MOT	NC1; 19	NC2; 18	NC	0
2013	Nissan GT-R GT500	M	GT500	23	(Japan) Masataka Yanagida (Italy) Ronnie Quintarelli	**OKA**; 3	FUJ; Ret	SEP; 9	SUG; 3	**SUZ**; 2	FUJ; 9	AUT; 8	MOT; 8	NC1; 7	NC2; 14	6th	71
2014	Nissan GT-R GT3	Y	GT300	3	(Japan) Kazuki Hoshino (Spain) Lucas Ordóñez (Belgium) Wolfgang Reip	OKA; 4	**FUJ**; 5	AUT; 4	SUG; 9	FUJ; 10	SUZ; 19	BUR; 1	MOT; 8			4th	68
2014	Nissan GT-R GT500	M	GT500	23	(Japan) Tsugio Matsuda (Italy) Ronnie Quintarelli	OKA; 7	FUJ; 8	**AUT**; 1	SUG; 14	FUJ; 2	SUZ; 2	BUR; 10	**MOT**; 1			1st	102
2015	Nissan GT-R GT500	M	GT500	1	(Japan) Tsugio Matsuda (Italy) Ronnie Quintarelli	OKA; 13	**FUJ**; 1	CHA; 5	FUJ; 4	**SUZ**; 7	SUG; 6	AUT; 1	MOT; 2			1st	100
2015	Nissan GT-R GT3	Y	GT300	3	(Japan) Kazuki Hoshino (Japan) Mitsunori Takaboshi (Belgium) Wolfgang Reip	OKA; 8	FUJ; 2	CHA; 1	FUJ; Ret	SUZ; 14	SUG; 8	AUT; 1	MOT; Ret			3rd	75
2016	Nissan GT-R GT500	M	GT500	1	(Japan) Tsugio Matsuda (Italy) Ronnie Quintarelli	OKA; 1	FUJ; 1	SUG; 9	FUJ; 4	SUZ; 6	CHA; 14	MOT; 9	MOT; 7			3rd	83
2016	Nissan GT-R GT3	Y	GT300	3	(Japan) Kazuki Hoshino (United Kingdom) Jann Mardenborough	OKA; 10	FUJ; 1	SUG; 5	FUJ; 6	SUZ; 10	CHA; 2	MOT; 13	MOT; 6			4th	76
2017	Nissan GT-R GT3	Y	GT300	3	(Japan) Kazuki Hoshino (Japan) Mitsunori Takaboshi	OKA; 7	FUJ; 6	AUT; 9	SUG; 8	FUJ; Ret	SUZ; 14	CHA; 9	MOT; 10			14th	36
2017	Nissan GT-R GT500	M	GT500	23	(Japan) Tsugio Matsuda (Italy) Ronnie Quintarelli	OKA; 7	FUJ; 4	AUT; 5	SUG; 4	FUJ; 2	SUZ; 2	CHA; 9	**MOT**; 1			2nd	103
2018	Nissan GT-R GT500	M	GT500	3	(Japan) Satoshi Motoyama (Japan) Katsumasa Chiyo	OKA; 7	FUJ; 10	SUZ; 7	CHA; 13	FUJ; 15	**SUG**; 8	AUT; 13	MOT; 9			13th	34
2018	Nissan GT-R GT500	M	GT500	23	(Japan) Tsugio Matsuda (Italy) Ronnie Quintarelli	OKA; 5	FUJ; 1	SUZ; 6	CHA; 12	**FUJ**; 9	SUG; 7	AUT; 15	MOT; 7			8th	64
2019	Nissan GT-R GT500	M	GT500	3	(Japan) Kōhei Hirate (France) Frederic Makowiecki	OKA; 4	FUJ; 6	SUZ; 9	BUR; 6	FUJ; 11	AUT; 11	SUG; 1	MOT; DNS	NC1; 11	NC2; 18	6th	54
2019	Nissan GT-R GT500	M	GT500	23	(Japan) Tsugio Matsuda (Italy) Ronnie Quintarelli	**OKA**; 2	**FUJ**; 2	SUZ; Ret	BUR; 11	**FUJ**; 3	AUT; 13	SUG; 3	MOT; 8	NC1; 12	NC2; 11	3rd	69.5
2020	Nissan GT-R GT500	M	GT500	3	(Japan) Kōhei Hirate (Japan) Katsumasa Chiyo	FUJ; 7	FUJ; 8	SUZ; 6	MOT; 7	FUJ; Ret	SUZ; 4	MOT; 15	FUJ; 6			6th	48
2020	Nissan GT-R GT500	M	GT500	23	(Japan) Tsugio Matsuda (Italy) Ronnie Quintarelli	FUJ; 11	FUJ; 9	SUZ; 1	MOT; 8	FUJ; 11	SUZ; 1	MOT; 7	FUJ; 9			5th	72
2021	Nissan GT-R GT500	M	GT500	3	(Japan) Kōhei Hirate (Japan) Katsumasa Chiyo	OKA; 9	FUJ; 5	MOT; 6	SUZ; 2	SUG; Ret	AUT; 4	MOT; 14	FUJ; 8			8th	58
2021	Nissan GT-R GT500	M	GT500	23	(Japan) Tsugio Matsuda (Italy) Ronnie Quintarelli	OKA; Ret	FUJ; Ret	MOT; 9	SUZ; 1	SUG; 7	AUT; 3	MOT; 15	FUJ; 7			10th	57
2022	Nissan Z GT500	M	GT500	3	(Japan) Kōhei Hirate (Japan) Katsumasa Chiyo	OKA; 5	FUJ; 15	SUZ; 1	FUJ; 12	SUZ; 4	SUG; 1	AUT; 7	MOT; 4			2nd	86.5
2022	Nissan Z GT500	M	GT500	23	(Japan) Tsugio Matsuda (Italy) Ronnie Quintarelli	OKA; 3	FUJ; 4	SUZ; 12	FUJ; 14	**SUZ**; 5	SUG; 2	AUT; 14	MOT; 13			7th	52.5
2023	Nissan Z GT500	M	GT500	3	(Japan) Katsumasa Chiyo (Japan) Mitsunori Takaboshi	OKA; 2	FUJ; 5	SUZ; 4	FUJ; 1	SUZ; 12	SUG; 9	AUT; 3	**MOT**; 13			2nd	85
2023	Nissan Z GT500	M	GT500	23	(Japan) Tsugio Matsuda (Italy) Ronnie Quintarelli	**OKA**; 1	FUJ; 7	SUZ; 13	FUJ; 13	SUZ; DSQ	SUG; 2	AUT; 10	MOT; 2			3rd	74
2024	Nissan Z GT500	B	GT500	3	(Japan) Mitsunori Takaboshi (Japan) Atsushi Miyake	OKA; 6	FUJ; 1	SUZ; 8	FUJ; 12	SUG; 6	AUT; 3	MOT; 7	SUZ; 7			3rd	76
2024	Nissan Z GT500	B	GT500	23	(Japan) Katsumasa Chiyo (Italy) Ronnie Quintarelli	OKA; 5	FUJ; 2	SUZ; 10	FUJ; 13	SUG; 12	AUT; 2	MOT; 9	SUZ; 8			8th	64
2025	Nissan Z GT500	B	GT500	3	(Japan) Daiki Sasaki (Japan) Atsushi Miyake	OKA; 10	FUJ; 10	SEP; 11	FS1; 8	FS2; 6	SUZ; 3	SUG; 12	**AUT**; 7	MOT; 9		11th	45
2025	Nissan Z GT500	B	GT500	23	(Japan) Katsumasa Chiyo (Japan) Mitsunori Takaboshi	OKA; 6	FUJ; 8	SEP; 13	FS1; 11	FS2; 9	SUZ; 1	SUG; 13	AUT; 6	MOT; 2		6th	73

Note: Non-championship (NC1, NC2) races are major races that do not count towards the championship.

=== World Endurance Championship ===
(Races in bold indicate pole position; races in italics indicate fastest lap)

Year	Entrant	Class	Drivers	No.	Rounds								Pts.	Pos.
Year	Entrant	Class	Drivers	No.	SIL (United Kingdom)	SPA (Belgium)	LMS (France)	NÜR (Germany)	COA (United States)	FUJ (Japan)	SHA (China)	BHR (Bahrain)	Pts.	Pos.
2015	Nissan Motorsports	LMP1	(Japan) Tsugio Matsuda (Spain) Lucas Ordóñez (Russia) Mark Shulzhitskiy	21			Ret						0	NC
2015	Nissan Motorsports	LMP1	(United Kingdom) Harry Tincknell (United Kingdom) Alex Buncombe (Germany) Michael Krumm	22			NC						0	NC
2015	Nissan Motorsports	LMP1	(United Kingdom) Max Chilton (United Kingdom) Jann Mardenborough (France) Olivier Pla	23			Ret						0	NC

== In popular culture ==
Team Nismo featured heavily in the Gran Turismo movie, centered around real-life racing driver Jann Mardenborough. The movie portrays a dramatized version of Jann's career under the team, and features many Nismo-related racecars, including the Nissan GT-R and its Nismo and GT3 versions, as well as the Ligier JS PX prototype.

== See also ==
- Infiniti Performance Line
- Mazdaspeed
- Toyota Racing Development
- Subaru Tecnica International
