= Nissan VRH engine =

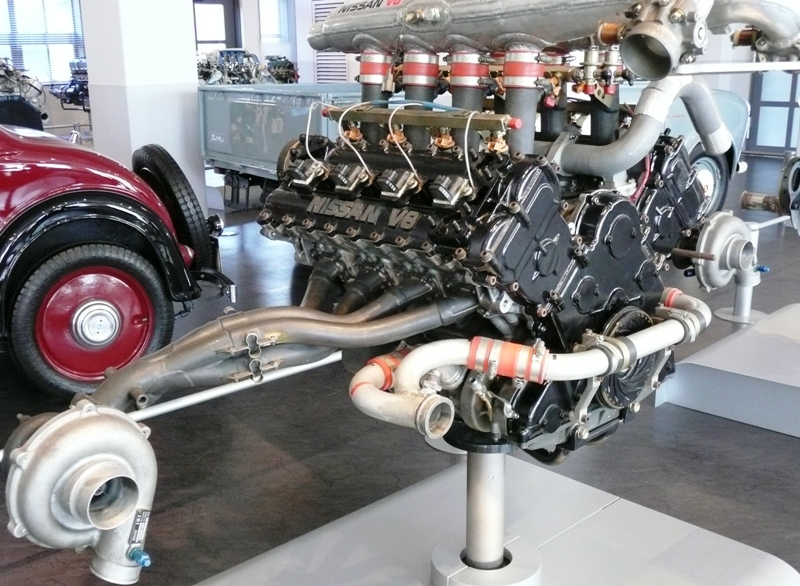

Overview
- Manufacturer: Nissan
- Designer: Yoshimasa Hayashi
- Production: 1988–2002

Layout
- Configuration: 90° V8
- Displacement: 3.0 L (2,996 cc); 3.5 L (3,495 cc); 3.5 L (3,499 cc); 4.0 L (3,999 cc); 3.4 L (3,396 cc); 5.0 L (4,997 cc)
- Cylinder bore: 85 mm (3.35 in); 93 mm (3.66 in); 96 mm (3.8 in)
- Piston stroke: 66 mm (2.60 in); 77 mm (3.03 in); 64.39 mm (2.54 in); 73.6 mm (2.90 in); 62.5 mm (2.46 in); 86.3 mm (3.40 in)
- Cylinder block material: Aluminium
- Cylinder head material: Aluminium
- Valvetrain: DOHC 4 valves x cyl.
- Compression ratio: 8.5:1, 9.0:1, 13.8:1, 14.0:1

Combustion
- Turbocharger: IHI (some versions)
- Fuel system: Fuel injection
- Management: ECCS-R-NDIS or Nissan Electronics/Hitachi HN-1
- Fuel type: Gasoline/Methanol
- Oil system: Multi-stage dry sump
- Cooling system: Water-cooled

Output
- Power output: 450 PS (331 kW; 444 bhp); 500 PS (368 kW; 493 bhp); 530 PS (390 kW; 523 bhp); 650 PS (478 kW; 641 bhp); 750 PS (552 kW; 740 bhp); 800 PS (588 kW; 789 bhp); 960 PS (706 kW; 947 bhp)
- Torque output: 290 lb⋅ft (393 N⋅m); 320 lb⋅ft (434 N⋅m); 325 lb⋅ft (441 N⋅m); 470 lb⋅ft (637 N⋅m); 542 lb⋅ft (735 N⋅m); 520 lb⋅ft (705 N⋅m); 578 lb⋅ft (784 N⋅m); 591 lb⋅ft (801 N⋅m)

Dimensions
- Dry weight: 120 kg (265 lb)?; 150 kg (331 lb); 170 kg (375 lb); 185 kg (408 lb)

Chronology
- Predecessor: Nissan VEJ30 engine

The Nissan VRH engine family consists of several racing engines built by Nissan Motor Company beginning in the late 1980s. All VRH engines are in a V8 configuration, with either natural aspiration or forced induction. Some VRH engines are loosely based on Nissan's production V8 engine blocks, including the VH and VK engines, while others were designed from the ground up for racing and share no components with production blocks.

The name "VRH" comes from the engines' V configuration ("V"), their purpose as racing engines ("R"), and the fact that all of them have eight cylinders (with "H" being the eighth letter of the Latin alphabet).

== History ==
In 1987, Nissan began work on an engine exclusively for race use; the result was the VEJ30 engine, developed by Yoshikazu Ishikawa. This engine was based on old technology, and was not a success. For 1988, the VEJ30 was improved by Yoshimasa Hayashi and renamed the VRH30. Changes included increasing the displacement to 3.4 L (3,396 cc).

This engine was, however, still based on the obsolete VEJ30, and development of the all-new VRH35 was started in parallel with the VRH30. In 1989, the VRH35 appeared as a new development engine and was used in the Nissan R89C.

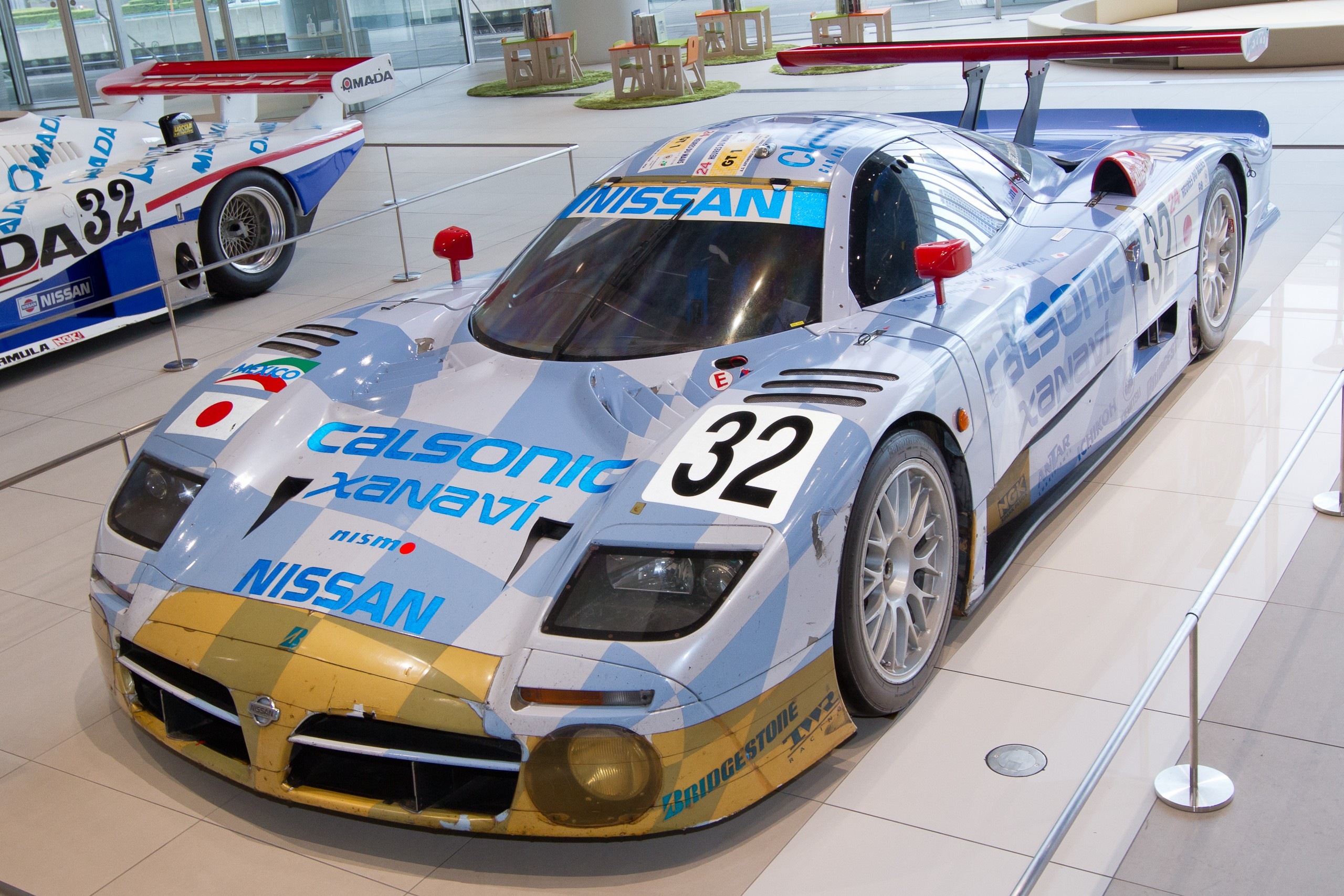
A Nissan R390 GT1 that was powered by the VRH35L engine

A 3.0-litre variant of the VRH35Z was also used in the 1998 Courage-Nissan C51 at the 1998 24 Hours of Le Mans. Both C51s failed to finish.

The design of the engine was later sold to McLaren, where it served as the basis of their M838T and M840T engines (which were used in all of McLaren's line-up since the McLaren MP4-12C).

== VRH30T ==
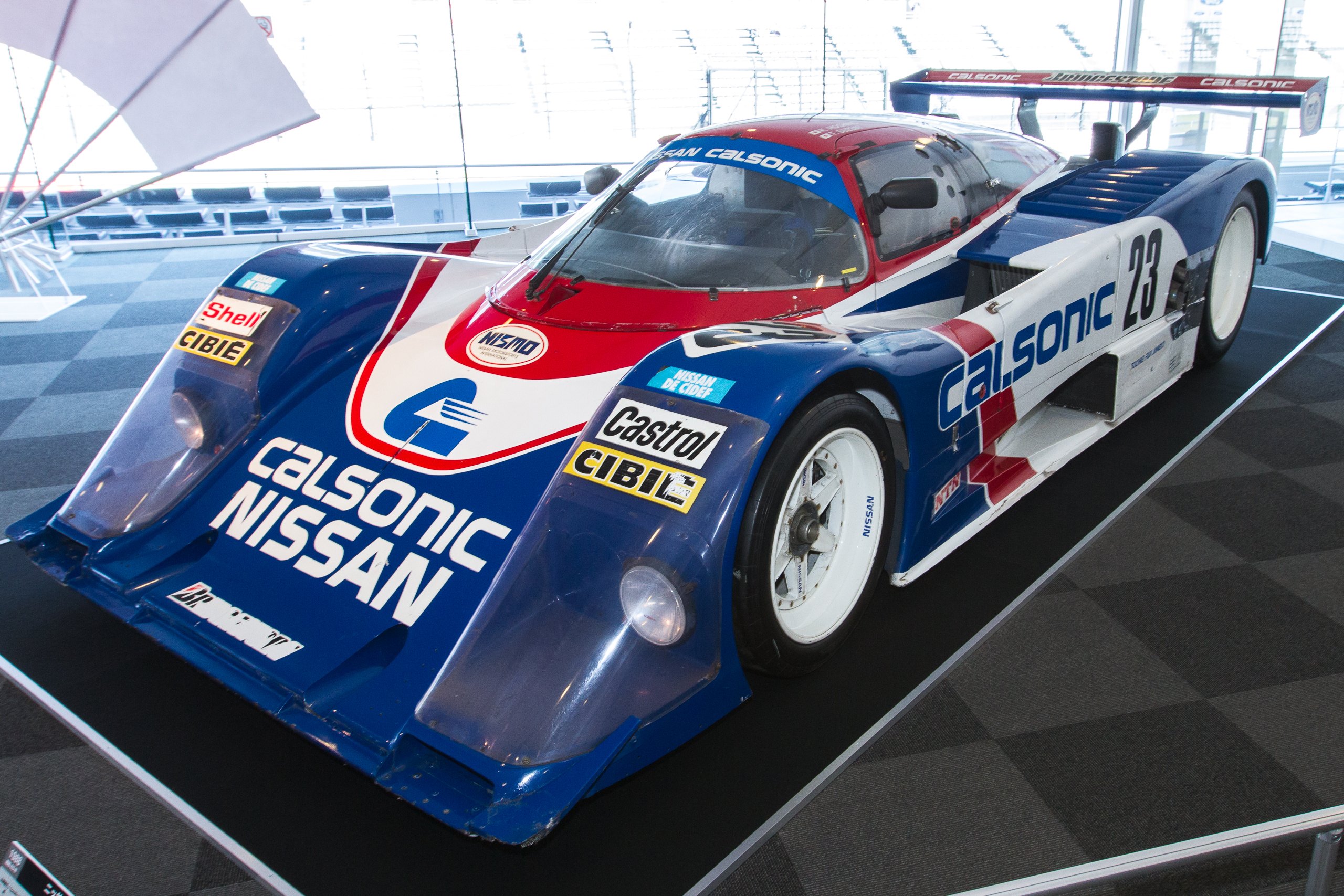
A Nissan R88C that was powered by the VRH30T engine

The VRH30T was used in the R88C.

- Cylinder Block: Aluminum 90° V8
- Aspiration: Twin-Turbo (IHI)
- Valvetrain: DOHC, 4 Valves per Cylinder
- Displacement: 3.0 L (2,996 cc)
- Bore x Stroke: 85 mm × 66 mm (3.35 in × 2.60 in)
- Power: 750 PS (552 kW; 740 bhp) at 8000 rpm
- Torque: 542 lb⋅ft (735 N⋅m) at 5500 rpm

== VRH35Z ==
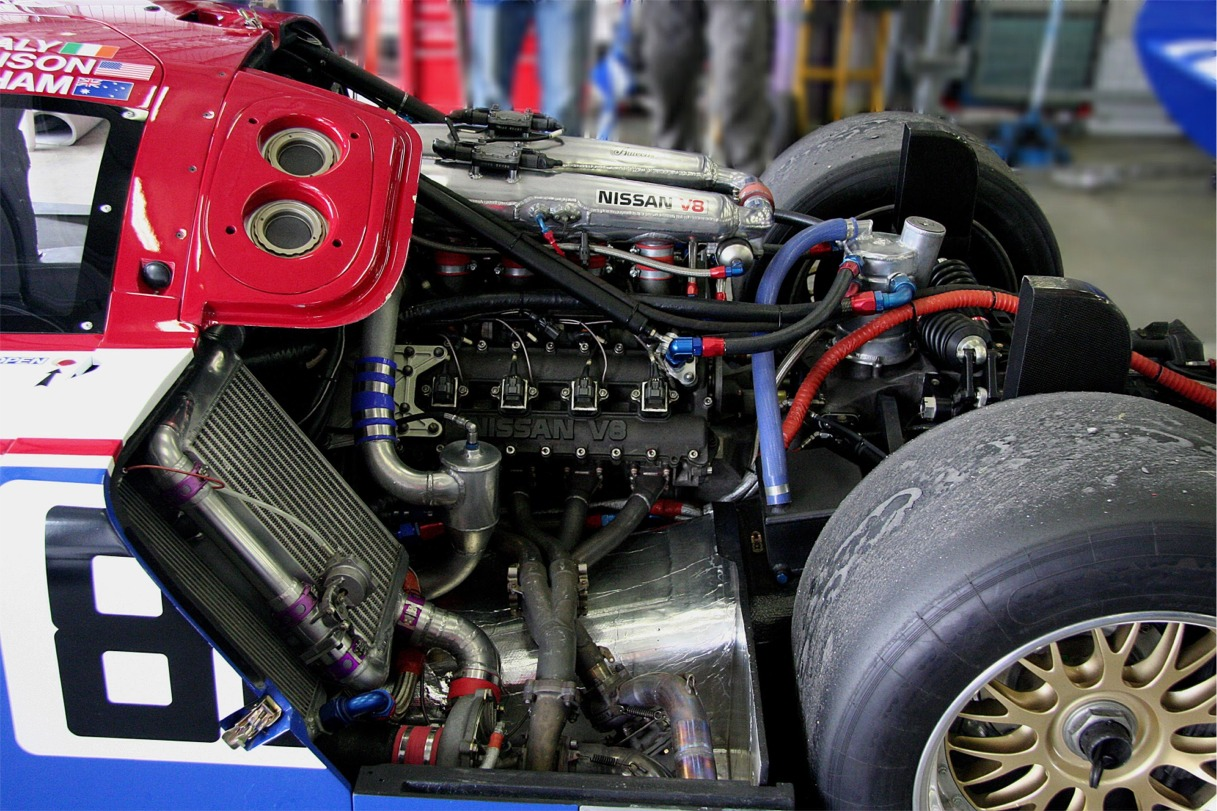
VRH35Z engine in a Nissan R90CK race car

The VRH35Z first appeared in 1990 in the R90C.

- Cylinder Block: Aluminum
- Aspiration: Twin-Turbo (IHI)
- Valvetrain: DOHC, 4 Valves per Cylinder

Displacement: 3.5 L (3,495 cc)

- Bore x Stroke: 3.35 in × 3.03 in (85 mm × 77 mm)
- Compression Ratio: 8.5:1
- Power: 800 PS (588 kW; 789 bhp) at 7600 rpm
- Torque: 578 lb⋅ft (784 N⋅m) at 5600 rpm
- Engine Management: ECCS-R-NDIS
- Weight: 185 kg (408 lb)

== VRH35L ==
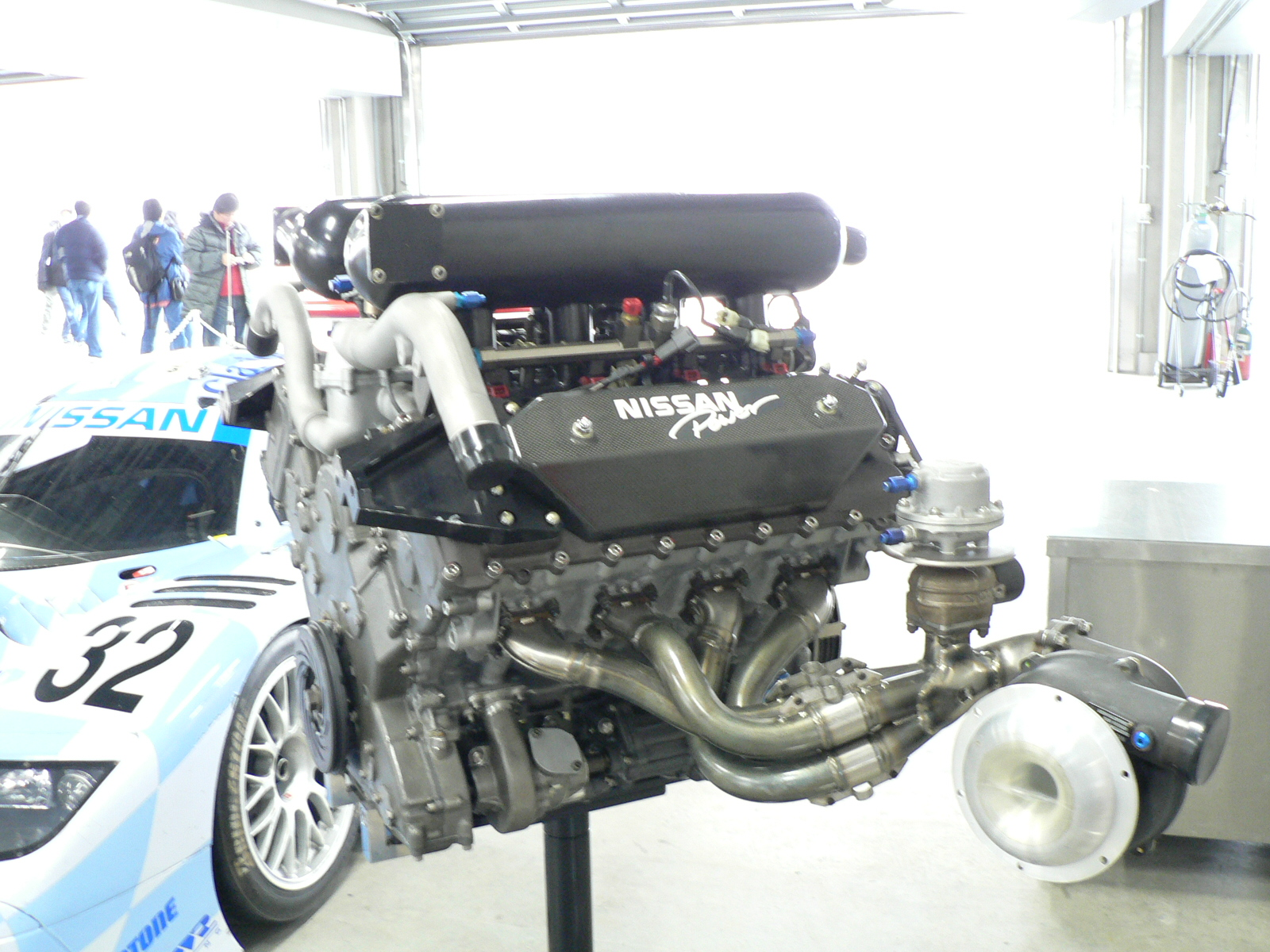
VRH35L engine from the R390 GT1

In 1997, Nissan, working in partnership with Tom Walkinshaw Racing, fielded a VRH35L in the R390 GT1.

- Cylinder Block: Aluminum
- Aspiration: Twin-Turbo (IHI)
- Valvetrain: DOHC, 4 Valves per Cylinder
- Displacement: 3.5 L (3,495 cc)
- Bore x Stroke: 85 mm × 77 mm (3.35 in × 3.03 in)
- Compression Ratio: 9.0:1
- Power: 650 PS (478 kW; 641 bhp) at 6800 rpm
- Torque: 520 lb⋅ft (705 N⋅m) at 4400 rpm
- Dry weight: 170 kg (370 lb)

== VRH35ADE ==
The VRH35ADE was used by Infiniti in their Indy race car.

- Cylinder Block: Aluminum-alloy block and heads; molybdenum-coated pistons
- Aspiration: Naturally Aspirated
- Valvetrain: DOHC, 4 Valves per Cylinder
- Displacement: 3.5 L (3,499 cc)
- Bore x Stroke: 93 mm × 64.39 mm (3.661 in × 2.535 in)
- Compression Ratio: 13.8:1
- Lubrication System: Multi-stage dry sump
- Oil Capacity: 12 US qt (11 L)
- Power: 650 PS (478 kW; 641 bhp) at 10700 rpm
- Torque: 320 lb⋅ft (434 N⋅m) at 10400 rpm

== VRH40ADE ==
The VRH40ADE was used by Infiniti in their Indy race car.

- Cylinder Block: Aluminum-alloy block and heads; molybdenum-coated pistons
- Aspiration: Naturally Aspirated
- Valvetrain: DOHC, 4 Valves per Cylinder
- Displacement: 4.0 L (3,999 cc)
- Bore x Stroke: 93 mm × 73.6 mm (3.66 in × 2.90 in)
- Compression Ratio: 14.5:1
- Lubrication System: Multi-stage dry sump
- Oil Capacity: 12 US qt (11 L)
- Power: 740 PS (544 kW; 730 bhp) at 10700 rpm
- Torque: 385 lb⋅ft (522 N⋅m) at 8500 rpm

== VRH34A ==
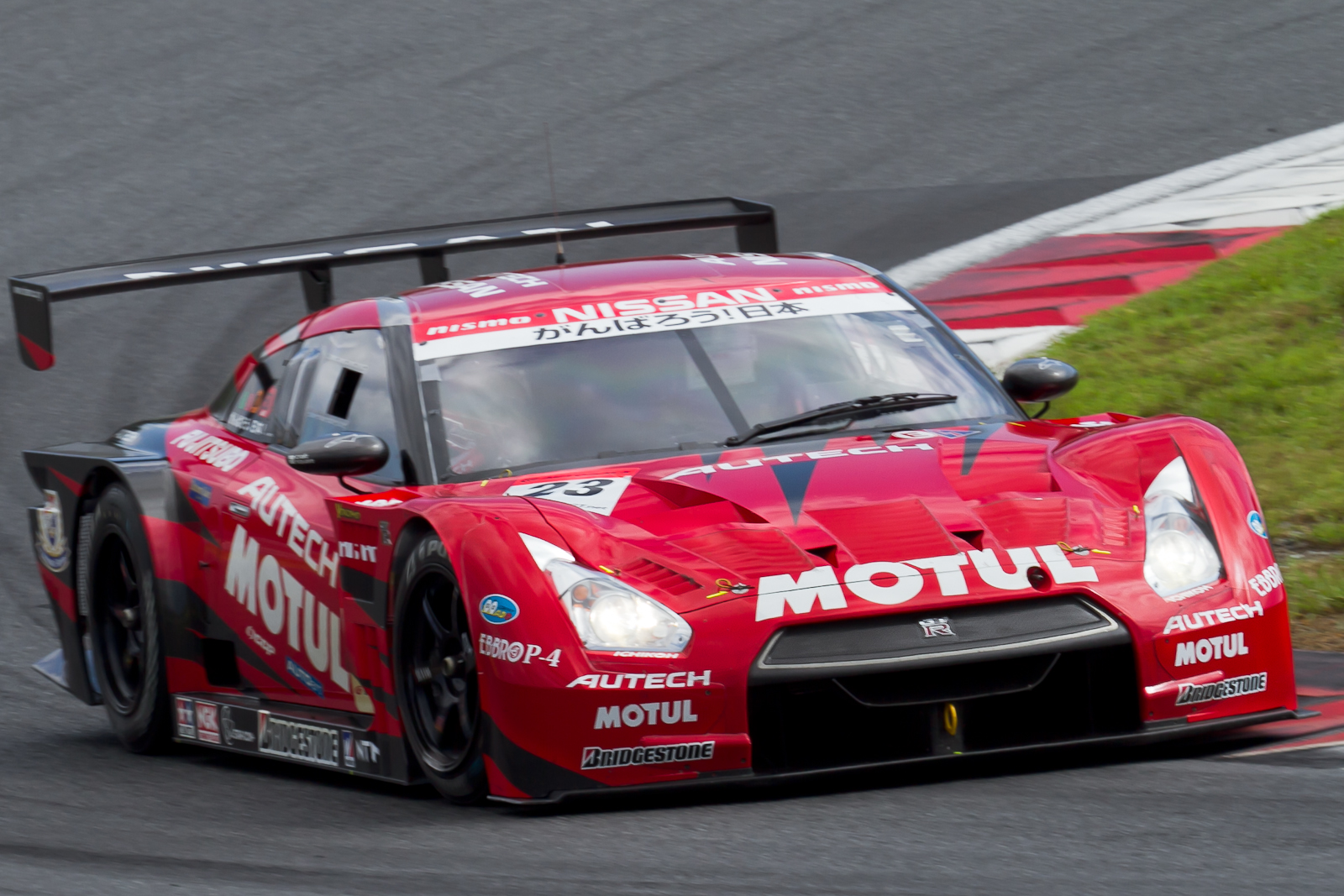
A VRH34A-powered Nissan GT-R that competed in the Super GT500 class

The VRH34A is one of two engines used in Nissan's GT500-spec GT-R.

- Cylinder Block: Aluminum
- Aspiration: Naturally Aspirated
- Valvetrain: DOHC, 4 Valves per Cylinder
- Displacement: 3.4 L (3,396 cc)
- Bore x Stroke: 93 mm × 62.5 mm (3.66 in × 2.46 in)
- Power: 450–500 PS (331–368 kW; 444–493 bhp)
- Torque: Over 290 lb⋅ft (393 N⋅m)
- Dry weight: 120 kg (260 lb) ?

== VRH50A ==
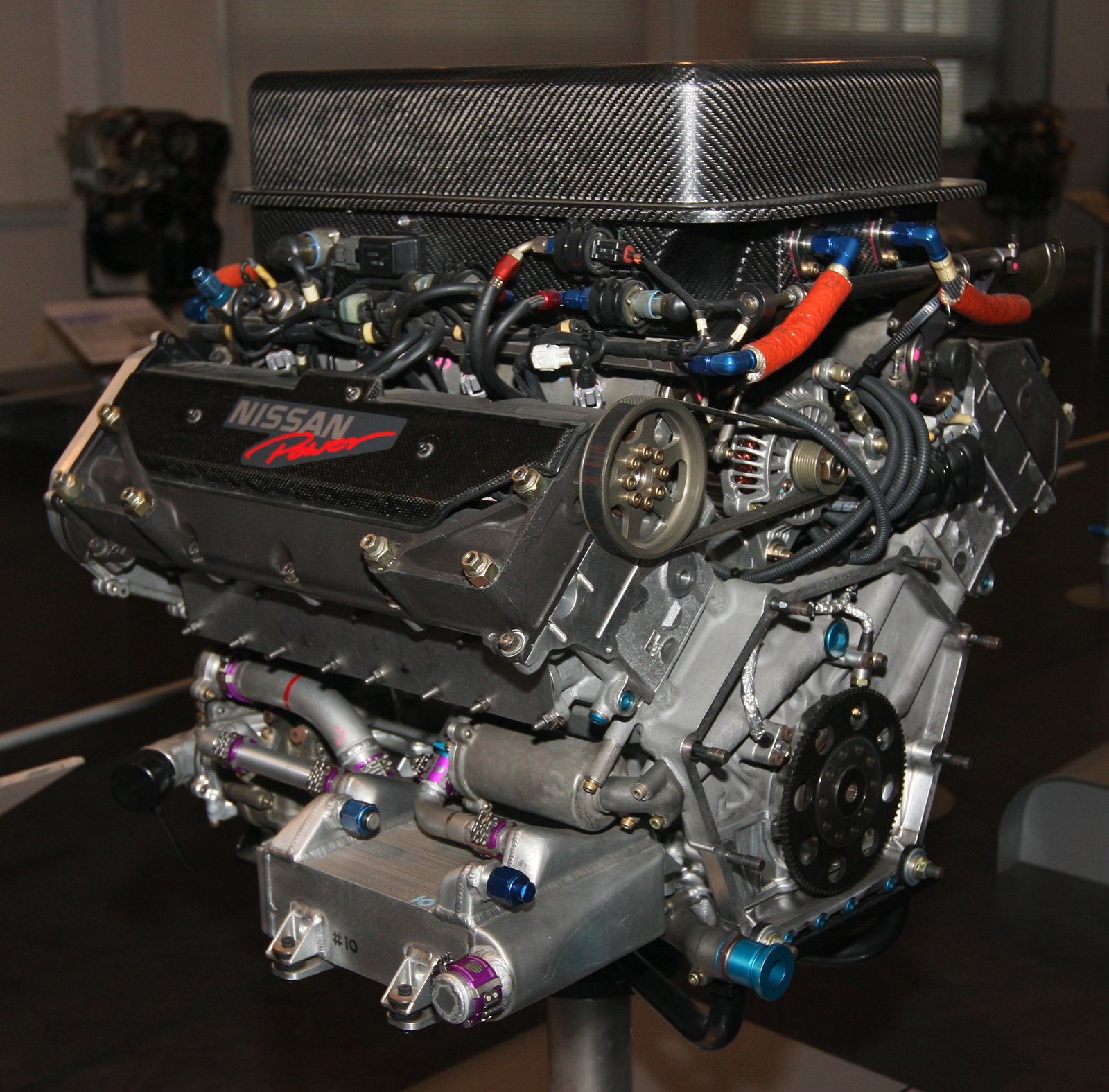
Nissan VRH50A engine at the Nissan Engine Museum

The VRH50A was used in the Nissan R391.

- Cylinder Block: Aluminum, Closed Deck
- Aspiration: Naturally Aspirated
- Valvetrain: DOHC, 4 Valves per Cylinder
- Displacement: 5.0 L (4,997 cc)
- Bore x Stroke: 96 mm × 86.3 mm (3.78 in × 3.40 in)
- Compression ratio: 14.0:1 (estimated)
- Redline: 8000 rpm
- Power: 650 PS (478 kW; 641 bhp) at 7200 rpm
- Torque: 470 lb⋅ft (637 N⋅m) at 6000 rpm
- Engine Management: Nissan Electronics/Hitachi HN-1
- Weight: 150 kg (330 lb)

== Caparo T1 ==
Caparo T1 engine

Overview
- Manufacturer: Menard Competition Technologies / Nissan
- Also called: MCT V8
- Production: 2006–2015

Layout
- Configuration: Naturally-aspirated 90° V8
- Displacement: 3,494 cc (213.2 cu in)
- Cylinder bore: 93 mm (3.66 in)
- Piston stroke: 64.3 mm (2.53 in)
- Cylinder block material: Aluminium
- Cylinder head material: Aluminium
- Valvetrain: DOHC, four valves × cylinder

RPM range
- Max. engine speed: 12,000 rpm

Combustion
- Fuel system: Sequential Fuel Injection
- Management: Pectel SQ6 ECU
- Fuel type: Petrol / Methanol
- Oil system: Dry sump
- Cooling system: Water

Output
- Power output: 575–700 hp (429–522 kW)
- Torque output: 310–350 lb⋅ft (420–475 N⋅m)

Dimensions
- Dry weight: 256 lb (116 kg)

Chronology
- Predecessor: Nissan VRH35ADE

The Caparo T1 engine is a high-performance automobile engine originally developed by Tom Walkinshaw Racing (TWR), and later produced by Menard Competition Technologies (MCT). It was used in the Caparo T1 sports car from 2006 to 2015. The engine is derived from the Nissan VRH35ADE IndyCar engine. Originally called the Freestream T1, the Caparo T1 roadcar was intended to be powered by a supercharged 2.4-litre V8 that produced 480 bhp (358 kW).

After the project was taken over by Caparo, that engine was abandoned in favour of a naturally-aspirated, 32-valve, 3,494 cc (213.2 cu in) V-8, with cylinder banks at 90°, and a dry-sump oil system. It weighs 116 kg (256 lb). The engine's block and cylinder heads are made of aluminium alloy, and its cylinder liners are of Nikasil-coated aluminium. The crankshaft is machined from steel billet, and is a flat-plane design. The injection system is sequential, with two injectors per cylinder. Each cylinder also has its own throttle butterfly. Actuation of the titanium valves is by finger-follower. The MCT V8 is managed by a fully tunable Pectel SQ6 engine control unit, and uses a throttle-by-wire system.

The production engine generates a maximum power of 575 hp (429 kW; 583 PS) at 10,500 rpm and a maximum torque of 310 lb⋅ft (420 N⋅m) at 9,000 rpm, giving the car a power-to-weight ratio of 1,223 horsepower per tonne (912.8 kW/t). An engine converted to methanol fuel is reported to have produced 700 hp (522 kW; 710 PS).

In 2009, Caparo announced a high-performance version of the T1 called the Race Extreme, which seemed to retain the 3.5-litre engine base, but which was tuned to produce 625 bhp (466 kW). An even higher output version of the car announced in 2014 was called the Caparo T1 Evolution, with an engine with a claimed output of 700 bhp (522 kW). It is unclear what model engine this version is based on.

== Other VRH engines ==
The VRH34A and VRH34B are naturally aspirated engines used by Nissan in their GT-R Super GT race car from 2010.

The VRH34A is 3.4 L (3,396 cc) and produces 450–500 PS (331–368 kW; 444–493 bhp) and over 290 lb⋅ft (393 N⋅m) of torque.

The VRH34B is 3.4 L (3,396 cc) and produces 500–530 PS (368–390 kW; 493–523 bhp) and over 325 lb⋅ft (441 N⋅m) of torque.

== See also ==
- List of Nissan engines
- Nissan VEJ30 engine
- Nissan VH engine
- Nissan VK engine
- Nissan
