= Nissan R87E =

Overview
- Manufacturer: Nissan
- Production: 1987
- Designer: Gordon Coppuck

Body and chassis
- Class: race car
- Layout: rear drive

Powertrain
- Engine: Nissan VEJ30, 4 stroke, petrol Twin-Turbocharged DOHC 32-valve V8
- Transmission: March 87T 5-Speed

Dimensions
- Wheelbase: 2,800 mm (110.2 in)
- Length: 4,780 mm (188.2 in)
- Width: 1,990 mm (78.3 in)
- Height: 965 mm (38.0 in)
- Curb weight: 850 kg (1,874 lb)

Chronology
- Predecessor: Nissan R86V
- Successor: Nissan R88C

The Nissan R87E was developed as a replacement to the R86V and featured a newly designed twin-turbo V8 engine dubbed the VEJ30 to compete in the 1987 Group C class.

== Racing history ==
Nissan received three 87G chassis from March that had minor improvements over the R86V chassis, and with the newly designed VEJ30 engine Nissan dubbed this new platform the R87E. For the 1987 racing season Le Mans was the sole objective, with only a single entry in the Fuji 500 km race as preparation for the event. Unfortunately, Nissan did not perform well at Le Mans that year, with each car failing to complete the race due to engine difficulties. Nissan blamed the poor results on the engine, and Nissan's engineers developed an entirely new engine dubbed the VRH30 as a replacement. With the newly improved engine, chassis modifications, and a new body developed in a wind-tunnel for better aerodynamics, the new cars would be renamed the R88C and compete in the 1988 and 1989 racing seasons.

== Specifications ==
Nissan VEJ30, V8 (90o) cyl, 4 stroke, petrol engine 2996cc, 85 x 66 mm 800 hp Aluminum-alloy block and head forged steel crankshaft with 5 main bearings DOHC, 4 Valves/cylinder - 32 valves total aspiration, 2 x IHI turbochargers with multipoint electronic fuel injection firing order 1 - 8 - 7 - 3 - 6 - 5 - 4 - 2 dry sump March 87T, 5 speed Manual gearbox aluminum monocoque chassis suspension (fr/r) double wishbones, coil springs over dampers, anti-roll bar rack and pinion ventilated disks 356mm disk diameter with 4 piston calipers all around Length 4780 mm (188.2 in) Width 1990 mm (78.3 in) Height 965 mm (38 in) Wheelbase 2800 mm (110.2 in) Track (fr/r) 1600 mm (63 in) / 1550 mm (61 in) wheels, front 13x17", rear 14x19" tires, front 320/30R17", rear 350/40R19" 850 kg

== See also ==
- Nissan
- Nismo
- Nissan R88C
