= Nissan VEJ30 engine =

Overview
- Manufacturer: Nissan
- Designer: Yoshikazu Ishikawa
- Production: 1987

Layout
- Configuration: 90° V8
- Displacement: 3.0 L (2,996 cc)
- Cylinder bore: 85 mm (3.35 in)
- Piston stroke: 66 mm (2.60 in)
- Cylinder block material: Aluminium
- Cylinder head material: Aluminium
- Valvetrain: DOHC 4 valves x cyl.
- Compression ratio: 8.5:1-9.0:1

Combustion
- Turbocharger: IHI (some versions)
- Fuel system: Fuel injection
- Management: ECCS-R-NDIS or Nissan Electronics/Hitachi HN-1
- Fuel type: Gasoline
- Oil system: Multi-stage dry sump
- Cooling system: Water-cooled

Output
- Power output: 760–811 PS (559–596 kW; 750–800 bhp)
- Torque output: 492–553 lb⋅ft (667–750 N⋅m)

Dimensions
- Dry weight: 120 kg (265 lb)

Chronology
- Successor: Nissan VRH engine

The Nissan VEJ30 is a 90-degree, turbocharged, four-stroke, gasoline-powered, sports car racing engines, built by Nissan Motor Company, in the 1980s. All VEJ30 engines are in a V8 configuration, and use forced induction turbocharging.

== Overview ==
In 1987, Nissan began work on an engine exclusively for race use; the result was the VEJ30 engine, developed by Yoshikazu Ishikawa. This engine was based on old technology, and was not a success. For 1988, the VEJ30 was improved by Yoshimasa Hayashi and renamed the VRH30. Changes included increasing the displacement to 3.4 L (3,396 cc).

=== Specifications ===
- Nissan VEJ30, V8 (90°) cyl, 4-stroke, gasoline engine
- 2996cc, 85 × 66 mm (bore x stroke)
- 750-800 hp
- Aluminum-alloy block and head
- forged steel crankshaft with 5 main bearings
- DOHC, 4 Valves/cylinder - 32 valves total
- aspiration, 2 x IHI turbochargers with multipoint electronic fuel injection
- firing order 1 - 8 - 7 - 3 - 6 - 5 - 4 - 2
- dry sump
- March 87T, 5 speed Manual gearbox

== Applications ==
- Nissan R87E

== See also ==
- List of Nissan engines
- Nissan VRH engine
- Nissan VH engine
- Nissan VK engine
- Nissan
