= Nissan R88C =

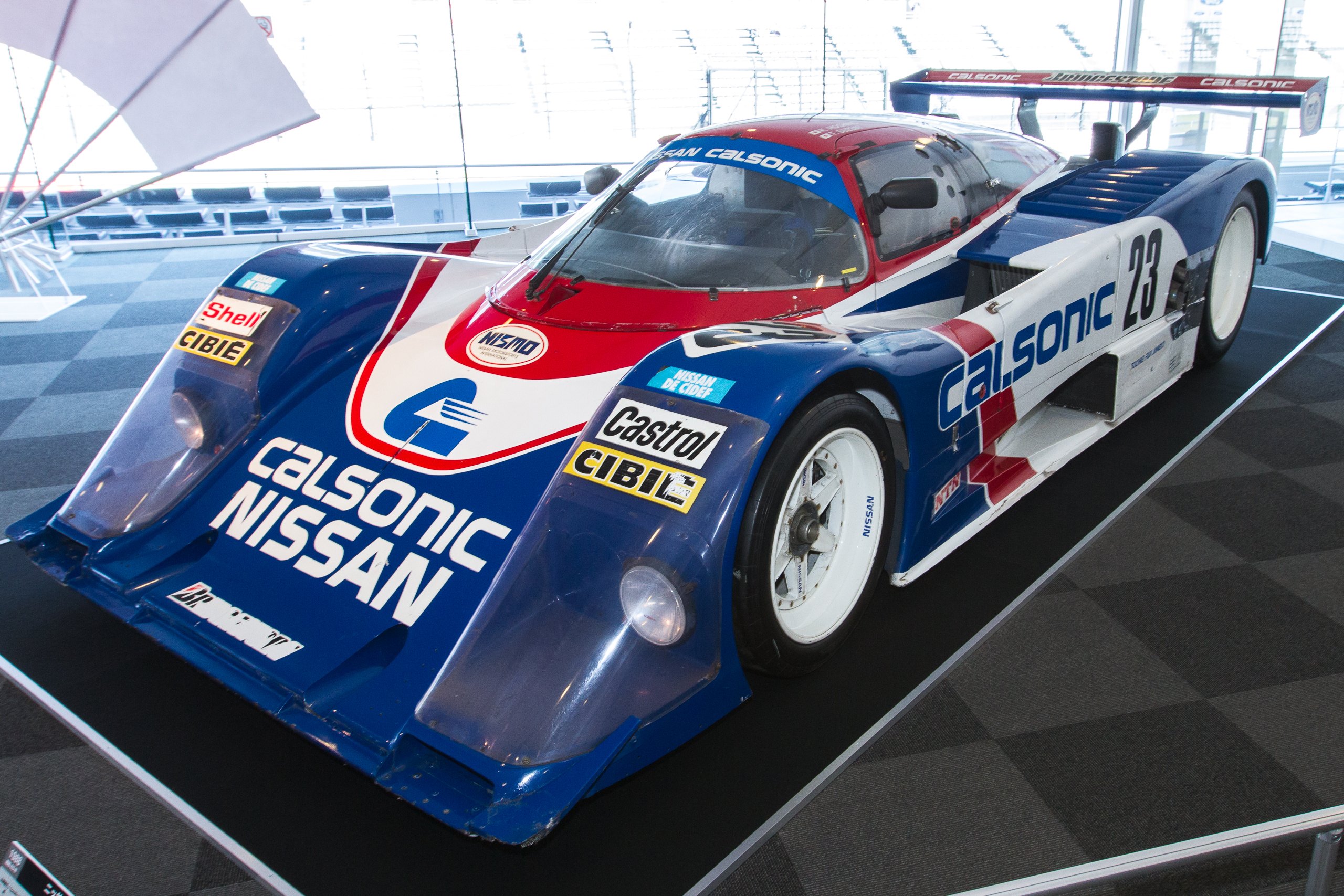
- Category: Group C
- Constructor: Nissan/Lola
- Designer(s): Trevor Harris
- Predecessor: Nissan R87E
- Successor: Nissan R89C

Technical specifications
- Suspension (front): Double wishbone
- Suspension (rear): Double wishbone
- Length: 4,780 mm (188 in)
- Width: 1,990 mm (78 in)
- Height: 965 mm (38.0 in)
- Wheelbase: 2,800 mm (110 in)
- Engine: Nissan VRH30T 3.0 L (183 cu in) twin-turbocharged V8 engine in mid-mounted longitudinal configuration
- Transmission: March 87T 5-speed manual gearbox
- Weight: 850 kg (1,870 lb); (minimum curb weight)
- Tires: 320/30R17 (13x17) (front); 350/40R19 (14x19) (rear)

Competition history
- Notable drivers: Masahiro Hasemi; Allan Grice; Win Percy; Mike Wilds; Kazuyoshi Hoshino; Takao Wada; Aguri Suzuki

The Nissan R88C is a sports prototype race car developed by Nissan and Lola for the 24 Hours of Le Mans.

== Design ==
A distinguishing feature of the R88C compared to its predecessors was that it was powered by a new engine, the VRH30, developed specifically for racing. The car itself had evolved considerably as well, featuring a longer wheelbase (to both improve aerodynamics and make room for the longer engine) and new cowl design. While the engine normally produced over 551 kW (749 PS; 739 hp) at 8,000 rpm, it could make approximately 950 hp (710 kW; 960 PS) during qualifying.

== History ==
Driven by Masahiro Hasemi, the #24 car took part in the 1988 and 1989 All-Japan Sports Prototype Championship races (up to the 2nd round in 1989). In the 1988 season, it placed 3rd in the 1st round at Fuji and the 5th round at Suzuka. In 1989, the R88C placed 3rd in the 2nd JSPC round at Fuji, and 4th in the 1st World Sportscar Championship round at Suzuka.

Two cars participated in the 1988 24 Hours of Le Mans; one was driven by Allan Grice, Win Percy, and Mike Wilds, and the other was driven by Kazuyoshi Hoshino, Takao Wada, and Aguri Suzuki. The former finished 15th overall, and the latter did not finish after its engine failed.
