= Nissan R89C =

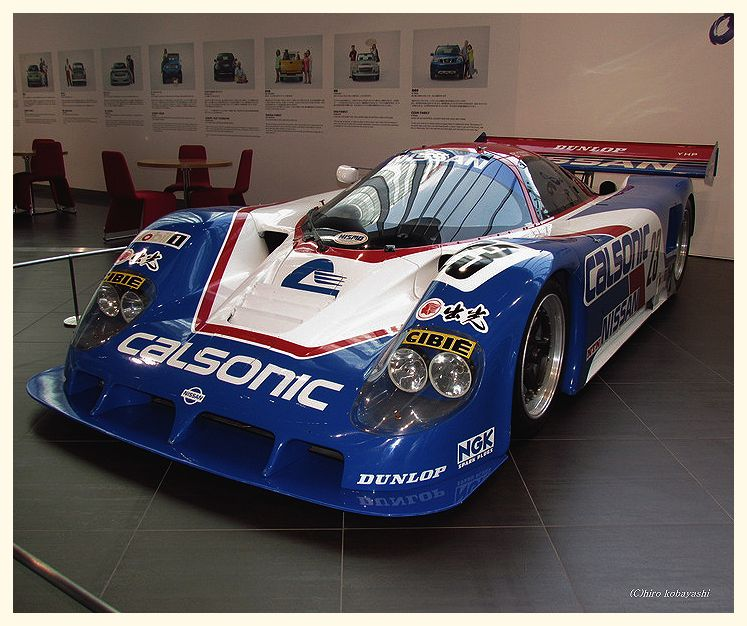

Overview
- Manufacturer: Nissan
- Production: 1989
- Designer: Eric Broadley (design concept); Andy Scriven; Clive Lark; Clive Cooper

Body and chassis
- Class: Group C race car
- Layout: MR layout

Powertrain
- Engine: 3.5L VRH35 DOHC twin-turbo V8; 950 hp

Chronology
- Predecessor: Nissan R88C
- Successor: Nissan R90C

The Nissan R89C was a Group C sports prototype developed by Lola Cars for Nissan.

== Development ==
Replacing the original March built series of prototypes that Nissan had used, the R89C was part of Nissan's increased involvement in the project. Developed in conjunction with the Lola firm, the R89C featured a Kevlar and carbon-fibre based monocoque chassis (named T89/10 internally at Lola). Nissan's new twin-turbo VRH35 3.5L V8 DOHC engine was mounted in a stressed installation for better chassis rigidity and produced up to 950bhp.

Four chassis were built by Lola, two being entered in the 1989 World Sportscar Championship season by Nissan Motorsport Europe (chassis #01 and #04) and two in the All Japan Sports Prototype Championship by Nissan Motorsport Japan (chassis #02 and #03).

== Racing history ==
In the 1989 World Sportscar Championship season, Nissan struggled to solve not only reliability problems, but also to find pace from the new chassis and engine. As a result, the R89C was only able to score points in three races. Even though, it finished the season fifth in the team's championship. In the All Japan Sports Prototype Championship, the R89C suffered the same fate, unable to compete with its developed Porsche and Toyota opponents, leaving Nissan to finish the season third in the championship. Meanwhile, at the 24 Hours of Le Mans, three R89Cs were entered into the race. However, all three failed to finish the race due to mechanical problems.

For 1990, the R89C was campaigned by Nissan for the first race of the World Sportscar Championship until it was replaced by both the R90CK and R90CP. 2 R89Cs would be passed on to privateer teams, with Courage Compétition managing to finish 22nd in the 1990 24 Hours of Le Mans with an ex-factory R89C (chassis #01). Chassis #03 was modified by Team Le Mans to become known as R90V. It ran JSPC with a best result of sixth before being retired. It also ran at Le Mans in 1990 retiring at about 7.00 AM.

R89C chassis #02 and #04 were rebuilt by Nissan Performance Technology Inc. as R90CP for use by Nismo at Le Mans and in the All-Japan Sports-Prototype Championship in 1990.
