= 1992 24 Hours of Le Mans =

60th 24 Hours of Le Mans endurance race

Previous: 1991	Next: 1993
Index: Races | Winners

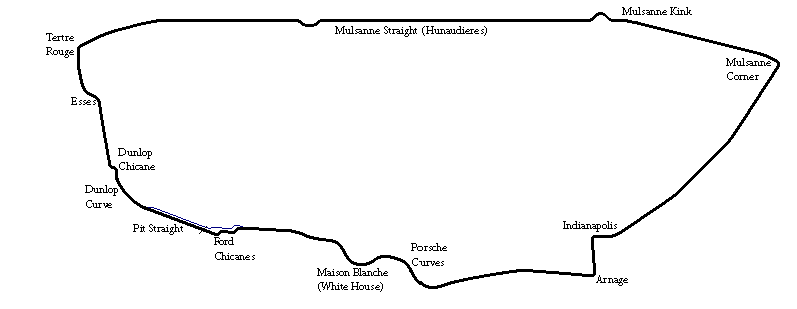
Le Mans in 1992

The 1992 24 Hours of Le Mans was the 60th Grand Prix of Endurance, taking place at the Circuit de la Sarthe, France, on the 20 and 21 June 1992. It was also the third round of the 1992 FIA Sportscar World Championship season. The FIA was struggling to assemble sufficient cars for the race, and so the entry-list was extended to include the older Group C cars and national trophy cars. The 28 starters was the lowest since the 1932 race. With the withdrawal of the Jaguar and Mercedes-Benz teams, it looked to be a Peugeot vs Toyota contest, each with very strong driver combinations, with the new Mazdas there waiting for any slip-ups. There were still considerable concerns that the 3.5-litre engines derived from Formula 1 could not last the distance. It was Philippe Alliot who took pole position for Peugeot, in a blistering lap fully five seconds faster than the lap record, with teammate Dalmas second.

The race started in wet conditions, making visibility hard. These two Peugeots set the initial pace until overhauled by 1991-winner, Volker Weidler in the new Jaguar-derived Mazda. It was soon apparent the wet-weather Michelin tyres of the Peugeots and Mazdas were handling the conditions far better than the Goodyears on the Toyotas, as they pulled out a gap. Despite a better weight-allowance for the Group C cars, the tighter fuel quantity meant they were never a factor for outright honours. Weidler led for the first hour, but a slow fuel-stop let the Peugeot of Derek Warwick, Yannick Dalmas and Mark Blundell into the lead. The rain eased off in the early evening, allowing the Toyotas to show their full potential until the drizzle returned again at 9pm. Through the night most cars suffered from mechanical issues or slid off the track in the treacherous conditions. However, the leading Peugeot remained trouble-free, building up a significant lead coming into the new day as the rain finally passed. The only hiccup for the leader was at 8.45am when Warwick came to a stop on the back straight with the engine cutting out. Three times he tried to get it started and eventually was able to limp back to the pits. Such was their lead though, he was able to limp back to the pits, get the electronics replaced for a quarter-hour and still come out with a 3-lap lead.

After that, they were unhindered and took a 6-lap victory over the Toyota of Kenny Acheson/Masanori Sekiya/Pierre-Henri Raphanel that was misfiring and losing power. The race for the podium places kept changing as the Toyotas, Mazda and other Peugeot kept having their charges thwarted by delays and issues. Third, barely a lap behind and closing quickly, was the other Peugeot team car, of Mauro Baldi/Philippe Alliot/Jean-Pierre Jabouille. After running a strong second through most of the night, the Mazda MXR-01 driven by 1991 winners Volker Weidler, Johnny Herbert and Bertrand Gachot had been waylaid by gearbox issues, but made it home in fourth, albeit running with half its gears missing.

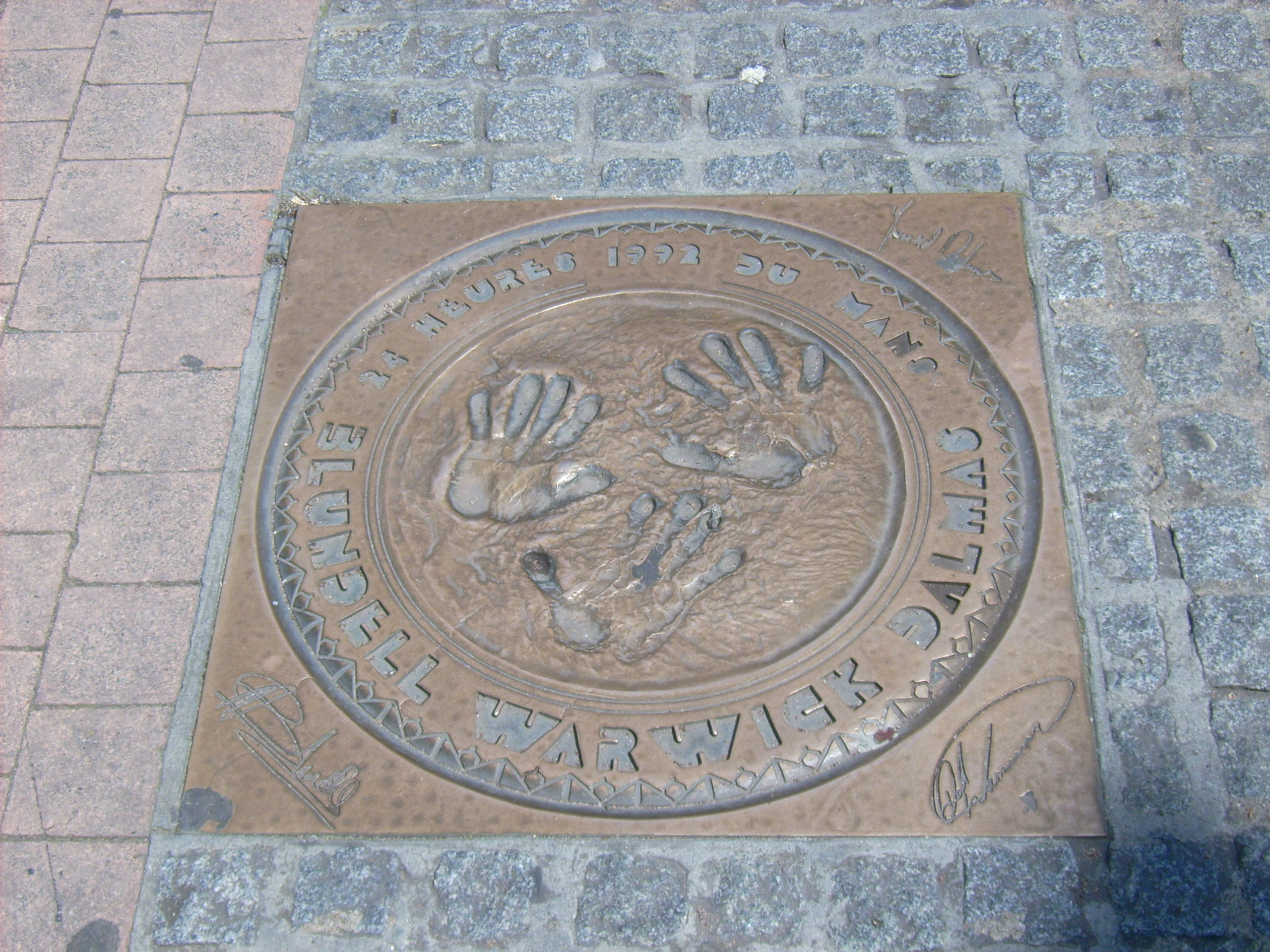
1992 Le Mans Victory plaque for Blundell/Warwick/Dalmas

== Regulations ==
The advent of the new regulations for the Sportscar World Championship in 1991 had been underwhelming. Indeed, in the close-season, the FISA (Fédération Internationale du Sport Automobile) Commission had recommended the cancellation of the series as the entries had been desultory and event promoters were put off by the exorbitant fees the body demanded. However, some crisis meetings were held and sufficient compromises were reached to see the Championship return in 1992. In March Peugeot, Mazda and Toyota each paid $3 million to FISA to convince them to keep the Championship running. The main regulations remain unchanged, however as an incentive for further entries, a new class called the FIA-Cup was initiated as a cheaper option. Set up for the former Group C2 cars had their Cosworth 3.5-litre engines limited to 9500 revs and would have steel-based brakes rather than the latest carbon brake systems. They would only score points in the European rounds, taking away the expense of the long-haul rounds elsewhere.

As the deadline approached, the premier race had a feeble 21 cars entered from those two classes so once again, the ACO (Automobile Club de l'Ouest) was forced to improvise. They opened the entry-list to the former Group C cars, with the return of Category 2 used in 1991. FISA gave their grudging approval of the reality but stipulated that the cars could only come from marques in the SWC past or present – which allowed Jaguar, Toyota, Spice and rotary Mazdas but excluded the Porsche 962. Therefore, a further dispensation was made for Porsche (and the Porsche-engined Cougars) in a new Category 3 – which FISA magnanimously stated was because “of the contribution made by this make to the World Championships and to Le Mans over many years.” Even so, FISA also put their limits on them – although they could race back at their original design-weight of 900 kg, they were only given 2140 litres, down almost 20% from the previous 2550 litres. TWR Jaguar led the requests for reconsideration, but Peugeot and Toyota vetoed the motion.

Entries were still lacking, so the deadline was extended again, and a final effort was made, opening up a fourth class to the low-cost, low-powered sports cars that ran in national European series – including the French Peugeot 905 Spider, Italian Coupe Alfa Romeo and British Pro-Sport 3000. To ensure a degree of safety between the disparate classes, the ACO required the average qualification time of the four best laps of all entrants be within 130%. 1992 also the formation of a specifically trained “extraction team” to rescue an injured driver safely from a crashed car. Finally, given the variation in classes and the previous inability to match fuel-consumption parity, the ACO also cancelled the Index of Energy Efficiency.

== Entries ==
At the end of 1991, both Jaguar and Mercedes-Benz had withdrawn from the World Championship, potentially ripping the competitive heart out of it. Only three major companies remained committed to the Championship: Peugeot, Mazda and Toyota with their five new SWC entries bolstered by extra works cars for Le Mans. The FIA Cup had only provided another six cars from privateer teams at the opening two rounds, and as mentioned, the extended list for SWC-class cars only came to 21 cars.

Those in Category 2 numbered just four, from Jaguar, Toyota, and ALD. The Porsche “class” of Category 3 provided 8 entries while the Category 4 promised nine cars but only delivered three. This all rustled up a medium-sized field of 44 entries but come race-week only 30 arrived for scrutineering – another disappointing race-low matching those of the entry low of 1932. It was noted that it resembled a non-championship Formula One race of the 1960s when a few factory cars would be up against a group of keen privateers.

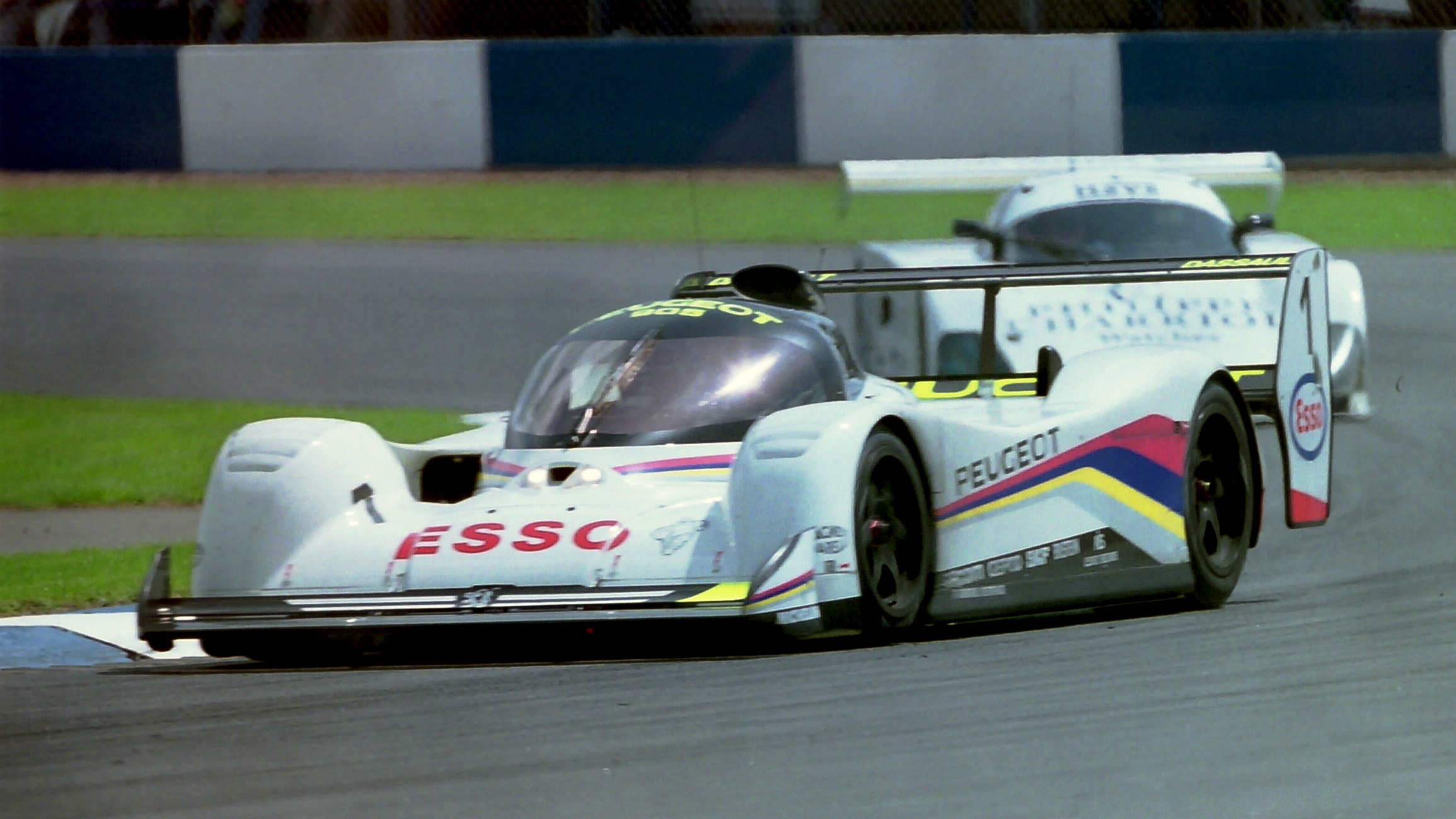
Peugeot 905B Evo 1-bis

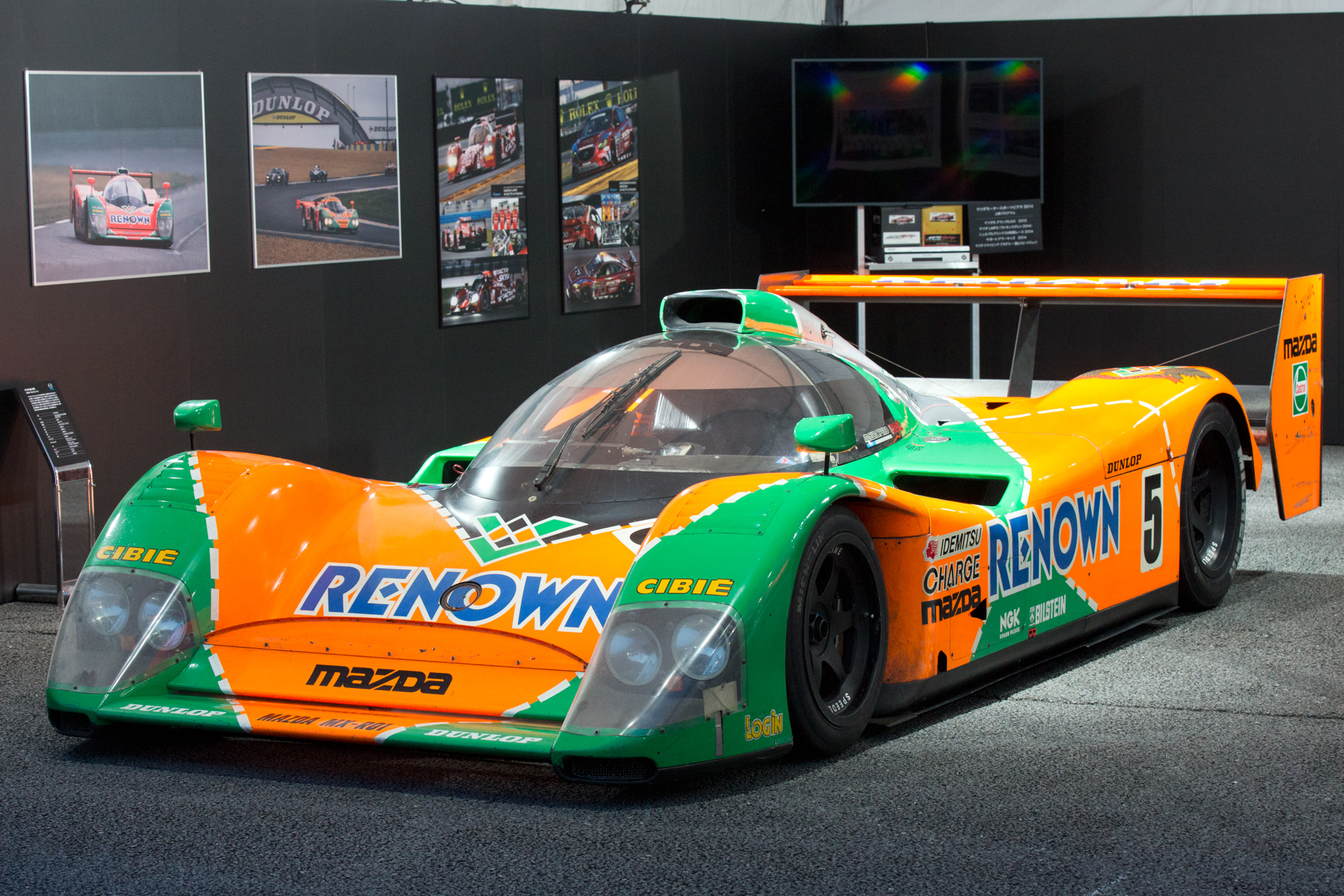
Mazda MXR-01

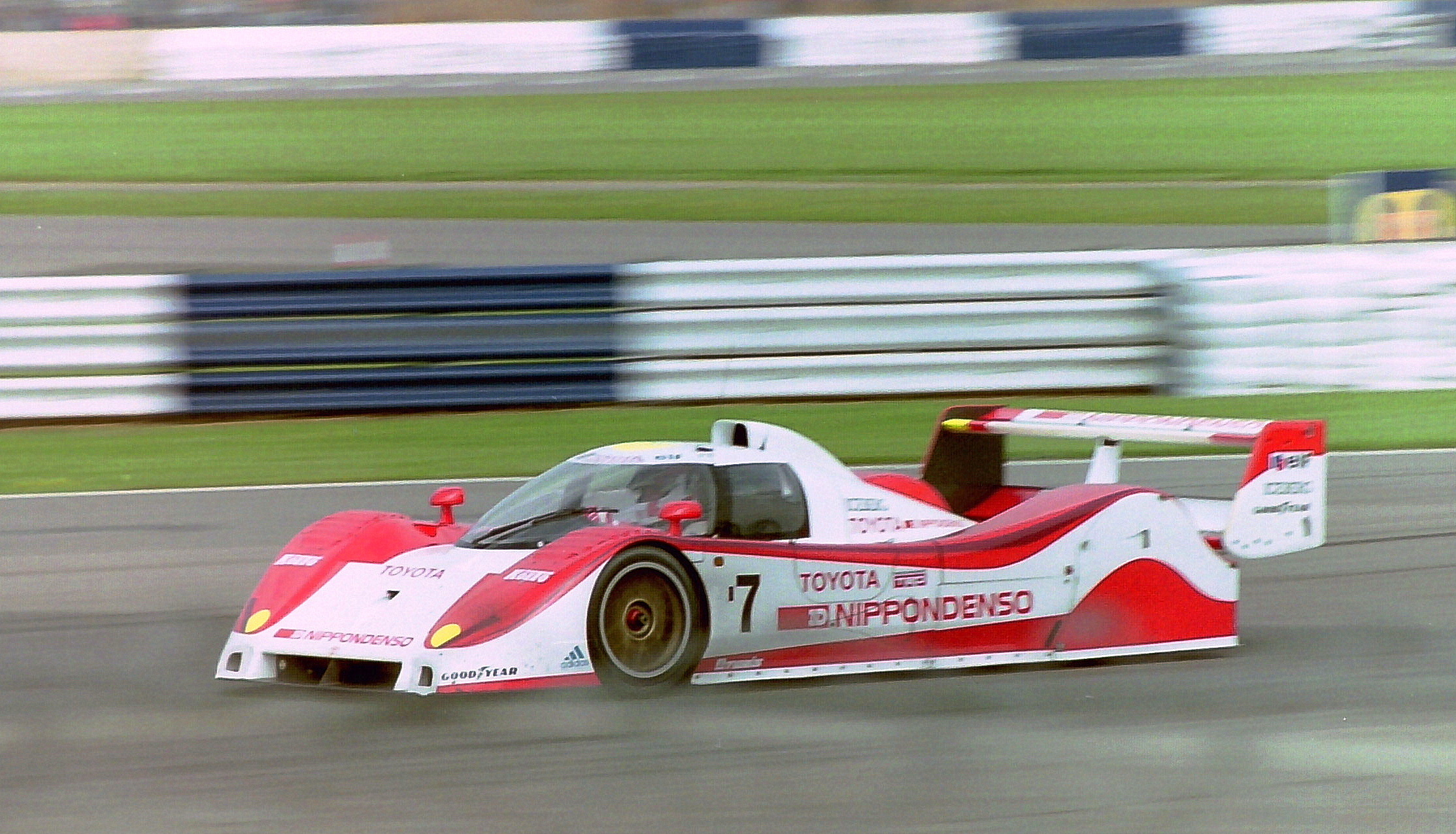
Toyota TS010

Class	Quantity	Turbo engines
FIA Category 1 SWC prototypes	15 / 11	0 / 0
FIA Category 1 FIA Cup	8 / 4	0 / 0
ACO Category 2 Group C SWC	4 / 2	2 / 2
ACO Category 3 Group C Porsche	8 / 8	8 / 8
ACO Category 4 Invitational	9 / 3	0 / 0
Total Entries	44 / 28	10 / 10

- Note: The first number is the number accepted, the second the number who started.

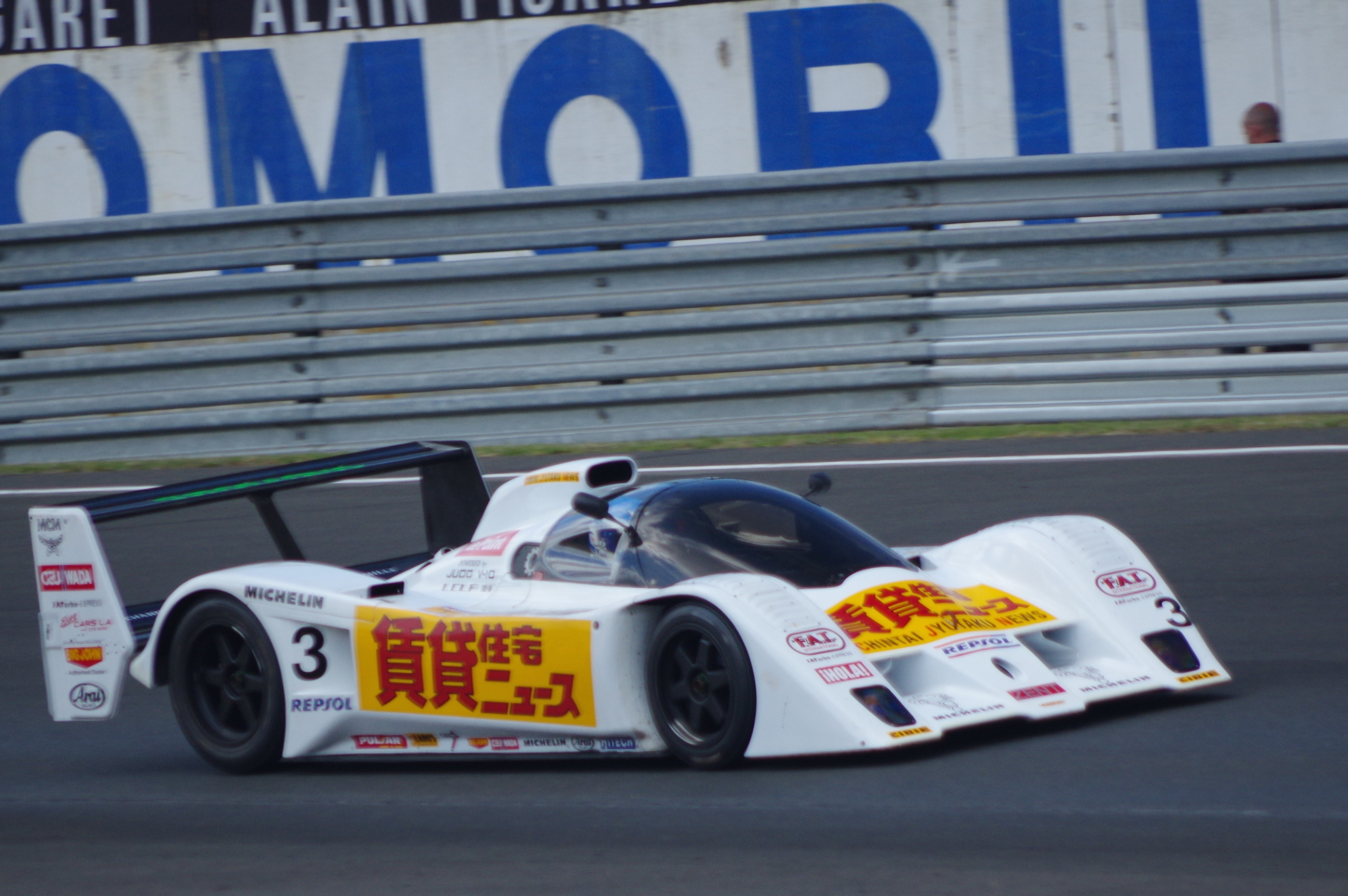
Lola T92/10

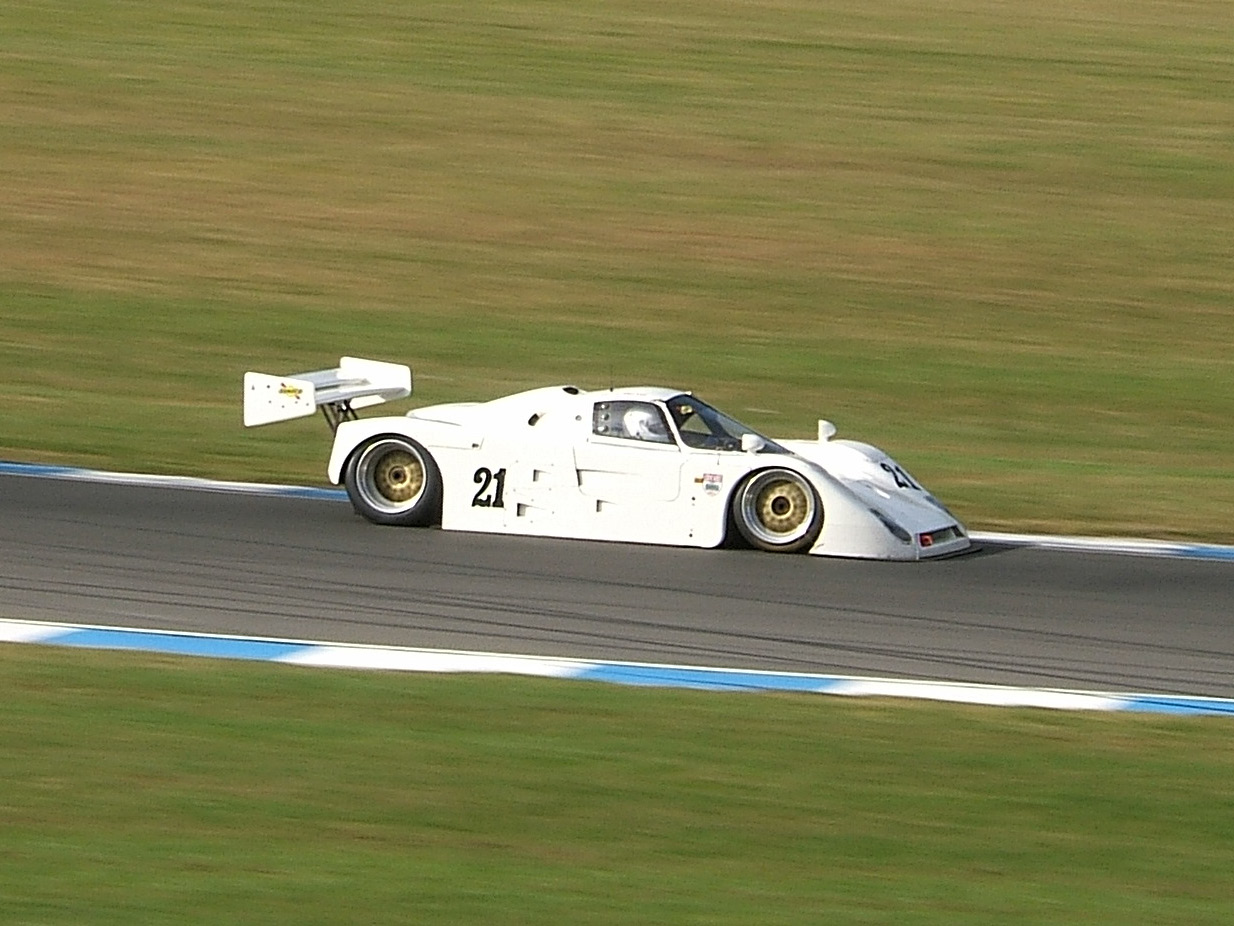
The Spice SE90C of Action Formula

=== Category 1 ===
Defending champions, Jaguar withdrew at the end of the 1991 season, as did Sauber-Mercedes leaving Peugeot as the only factory team remaining. Their updated model, the Peugeot 905 Evo 1-bis, had debuted at the Nürburgring round following the Le Mans race. Although it used the same hull, it had a full makeover above with a stubby nose and lowered shell with new vents by the cockpit to cool the relocated radiators in the side-pods. A large new twin-plane rear wing off the back of the chassis improved downforce. It was calculated these low, wide-bodied cars could generate more downforce than any other sports car, able to pull 4G in the corners. The Peugeots were also the first cars to race with xenon headlights, using an electric arc rather than a metal filament giving a very bright, pure-white beam that could extend over 300 metres. Jean-Pierre Boudy extracted an extra 20 bhp from the 3.5-litre V10 engine which was now a sturdier steel construction built for endurance rather than lightness, as was the transmission. The team ran six 24-hour tests, mostly at the Circuit Paul Ricard, even getting chicanes set up on its Mistral straight for a better simulation. Two cars were running in the SWC, again managed by team director Jean Todt, with a team of ex-Formula 1 drivers: Derek Warwick had been released by Jaguar and partnered Yannick Dalmas. They had finished second in the opening round and won the next at Silverstone, and for this race were joined by Mark Blundell. Mauro Baldi and Philippe Alliot raced the second car, as they did the previous year, with veteran Jean-Pierre Jabouille as their co-driver. A third car, driven by Alain Ferté, Eric van der Poele and ex-Mercedes driver Karl Wendlinger was also entered for this race only.

Mazda had known their race-winning Mazda 787B was being rendered obsolete under the new regulations, so started investigating a potential 3.5-litre car. Mazdaspeed used their connection to sister-company Jaguar, through their parent Ford company, to order their XJR-14 composite monocoques. They were fitted with Judd V10 Formula 1 engines, badged as Mazdas. Overseen by their successful racing engineer, Nigel Stroud, adjustments were needed to fit in the longer engine. The model, called the MXR-01, needed much work to upgrade it from a sprint-car to an endurance racer. The biggest work was put into the engine, strengthening both it and its Hewland transmission. However, with an output of 600 bhp and a top speed of only 325 kp/h, the performance was underwhelming, giving away around 20 kp/h to their Peugeot and Toyota rivals. Five chassis were purchased, four of them came to Le Mans with two as test-cars. The winning team of 1991, Volker Weidler, Johnny Herbert and Bertrand Gachot, had one car, again decked out in the same orange-&-green Renown livery as their previous steed. The second car would be driven by their Japanese veterans Yojiro Terada and Takashi Yorino, with Brazilian Maurizio Sandro Sala.

Having taken a year out from the championship, Toyota returned with a new SWC car, the TS010. This was the first racing Toyota not designed by a Japanese engineer, but instead came out of the TOMS-Europe facility. Tony Southgate, designer of Jaguar's Le Mans-winning XJR-12, was brought on board as project co-ordinator. The car was built around the completely new 3.5-litre RV10 engine. The all-aluminium block had a 72° V10 with two valves per cylinder and could develop 660 and was fitted to a 6-speed gearbox. The chassis was a carbon/kevlar composite, with a very low profile and, like Peugeot, developed strong downforce with a large twin-plane rear wing. The car was unveiled for the last race of the ’91 season and had a good start to the new season by winning the opening round at Monza by default, albeit as the sole classified finisher. Drivers Geoff Lees and Hitoshi Ogawa had raced for the team for a number of years, however Ogawa was tragically killed in May in an All-Japan Formula 3000 race. His place was taken by Australian David Brabham (ex-Jaguar) with Ukyo Katayama as the third driver. The second car had also pulled in drivers from the TWR team, with Jan Lammers and Andy Wallace who had reigning Drivers Champion Teo Fabi as their drop-in third driver. The third car would be driven by Kenny Acheson/Masanori Sekiya/Pierre-Henri Raphanel.

Lola Cars had tried making a Group C/IMSA car (the T600), but it was not success. Instead, Eric Broadley's company achieved more when they built the custom-chassis for Nissan's Group C program. However, with the end of the turbo-era, Lola was left without a contract and so looked to develop a ‘customer’ car for the new formula. Developed by former Spice technical director Graham Humphrys, the Lola T92/10 had a modern honeycomb/Carbon monocoque and carbon-fibre chassis. Like Mazda, it was fitted with the Formula 1 Judd engine although not with the modifications that Mazda put in. The first two orders went to Dutchman Charles Zwolsman and his Euro Racing team, replacing his uncompetitive Spices. After failing to finish in the opening races, the team strengthened the Lola gearbox and reworked the rear suspension. Now under the team management of Brit Roy Baker, they entered both cars for the race. Zwolsman raced with his regular co-driver, Cor Euser, and Jesús Pareja. The owner also entered himself in the second car, along with Heinz-Harald Frentzen and Shunji Kasuya.

A marque making a surprise return to motor-racing was BRM, last seen in Formula 1 fifteen years ago. They were no strangers to Le Mans however, having worked with Rover for the unique Rover-BRM turbine car in the mid-1960s. Entrepreneur John Mangoletsi approached the Rubery Owen company in 1989 about the idea of making a road-going supercar and racing sportscar. Engineer Paul Brown, who had worked at Zakspeed, March and Chevron, designed the new P351 with Chris Norris. The tub was fashioned from advanced composites. Terry Hoyle built the 3.5-litre V12 based on the style of the old Formula 1 Weslake V12 engine. The lead drivers hired for the season were South African Wayne Taylor and former rally-driver Harri Toivonen. Due to mechanical problems, they were unable to start at the Silverstone round and so arrived at le Mans with not even two hours of track-time to shake down the new car. Richard Jones was the third driver.

In the days of the C2 class, Spice Engineering had dominated as a builder of customer cars. The advent of the FIA Cup as a cheaper option for privateers perfectly suited these aging Category 1 cars. The division had five entries, four of them being Spices. Hugh Chamberlain entered both of his SE89C cars from last year, once again in conjunction with Euro Racing. His team driver, Ferdinand de Lesseps, was joined by Richard Piper and Olindo Iacobelli who had latterly run in Piper's PC Automotive team. Iacobelli was the sole American in the race this year. The second car had a crew of three Japanese drivers, all racing in Formula 3: Jun Harada, Kenta Shimamura and Tomiko Yoshikawa (who had now got her racing licence sorted that had her excluded from the race last year). Belgian Bernard de Dryver's new team, Action Formula, brought an SE90C with a DFR Cosworth engine. His championship drivers were Italians “Gigi” Taverna and Alessandro Gini, with veteran John Sheldon as their third driver. Tim Lee-Davey gave away running a Porsche and this year brought a Spice SE90C, which he ran in Category 1. Perennially short of funding, he arrived without a confirmed driver line-up and sold the three seats in the paddock upon arrival – to Chris Hodgetts, French veteran François Migault and Thierry Lecerf. Ranieri Randaccio was running a Spice in the World Championship and a Tiga in the Interserie. However, the Spice was giving the team a number of gearbox problems, so he chose to bring the Tiga to Le Mans. Originally bought as a GC288, it had been upgraded in 1989 to the GC289 standard with a semi-carbon monocoque. It was fitted with a 3.3-Cosworth DFL tuned by John Nicholson. Lack of funding in the end precluded the arrival of a proposed privateer Jaguar effort, just days before scrutineering.

=== Category 2 ===
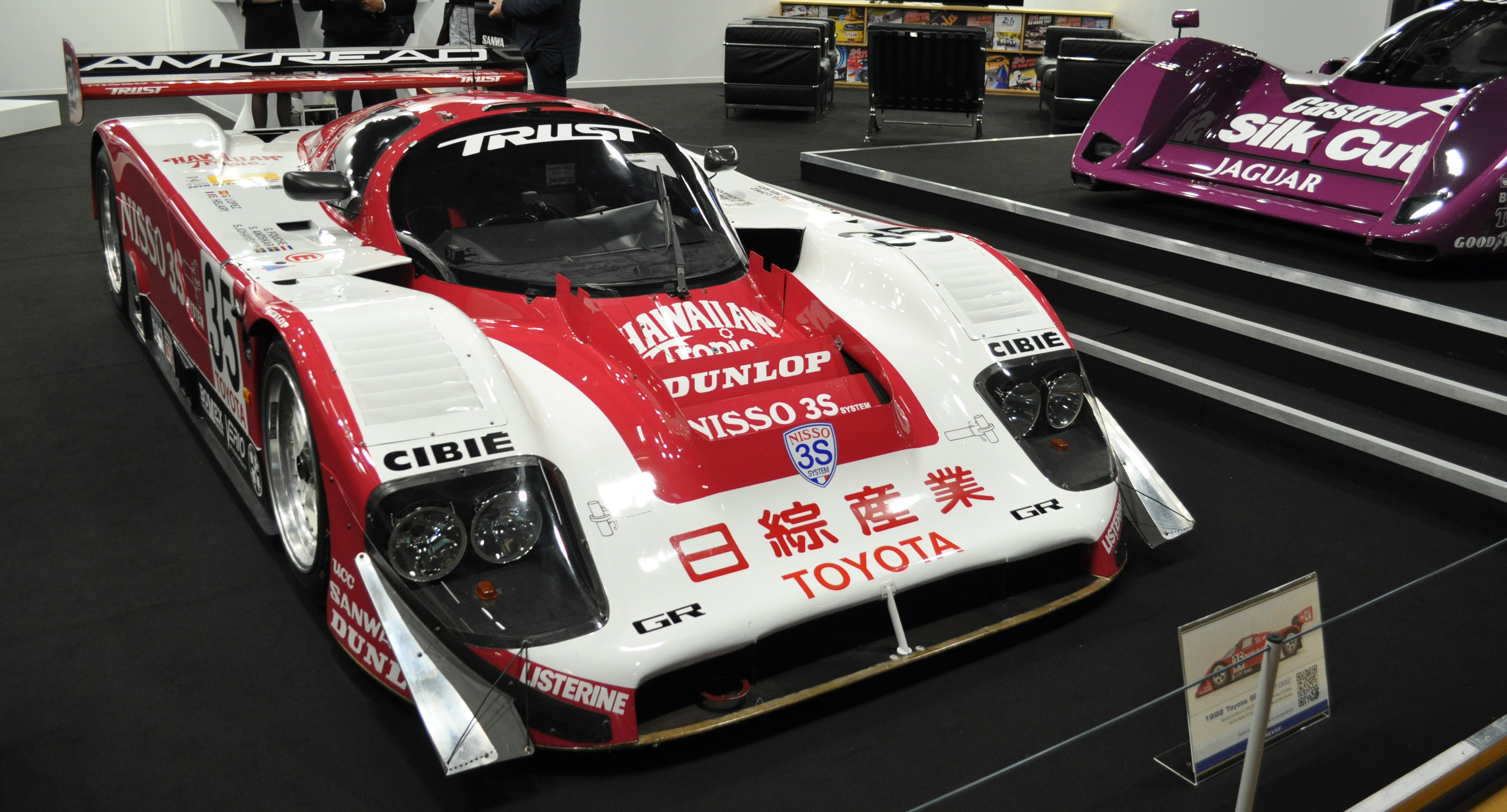
Toyota 92C-V

In 1991, the Category 2 was used to admit the turbocharged Group C cars. The FISA restrictions this year left the class only open to those manufacturers that had Category 1 cars in 1991 or 1992. This could have allowed Jaguar, Mercedes entries and even the rotary Mazdas would be eligible. However, it was only Toyota that took up this option, with two customer teams supported by the works department. They fielded the 92C-V, the latest iteration of the Group C model run in the All-Japan championship. The 3.6-litre twin-turbo V8 had 4 valves per cylinder and designer Southgate did further aero improvements. Shin Kato's SARD team had been a stalwart customer over the years, and the drivers were the regular trio running in the Japanese championship: Eddie Irvine, Roland Ratzenberger and Eje Elgh. The other team was Trust Racing, that had been running Porsches in its six years. Team owner Yasuo Toyota hired a team of Le Mans veterans for his car: Stefan Johansson/George Fouché/Steven Andskär.

ALD had been a regular entrant at Le Mans over the past decade, however the tragic death of team principal Louis Descartes in a road-accident in December spelled the end for the small French team. Marc Pachot Racing brought one of the last chassis made, a C289, to Le Mans – eligible for Category 2 as ALD had run the full championship in 1991. They took out the Cosworth engine and swapped it with a 300 bhp Peugeot 3-litre V6, although it was well down in power on their Toyota rivals. Veteran Raymond Touroul came in to provide Pachot and his fellow rookie Didier Cadarec with some experience.

=== Category 3 ===
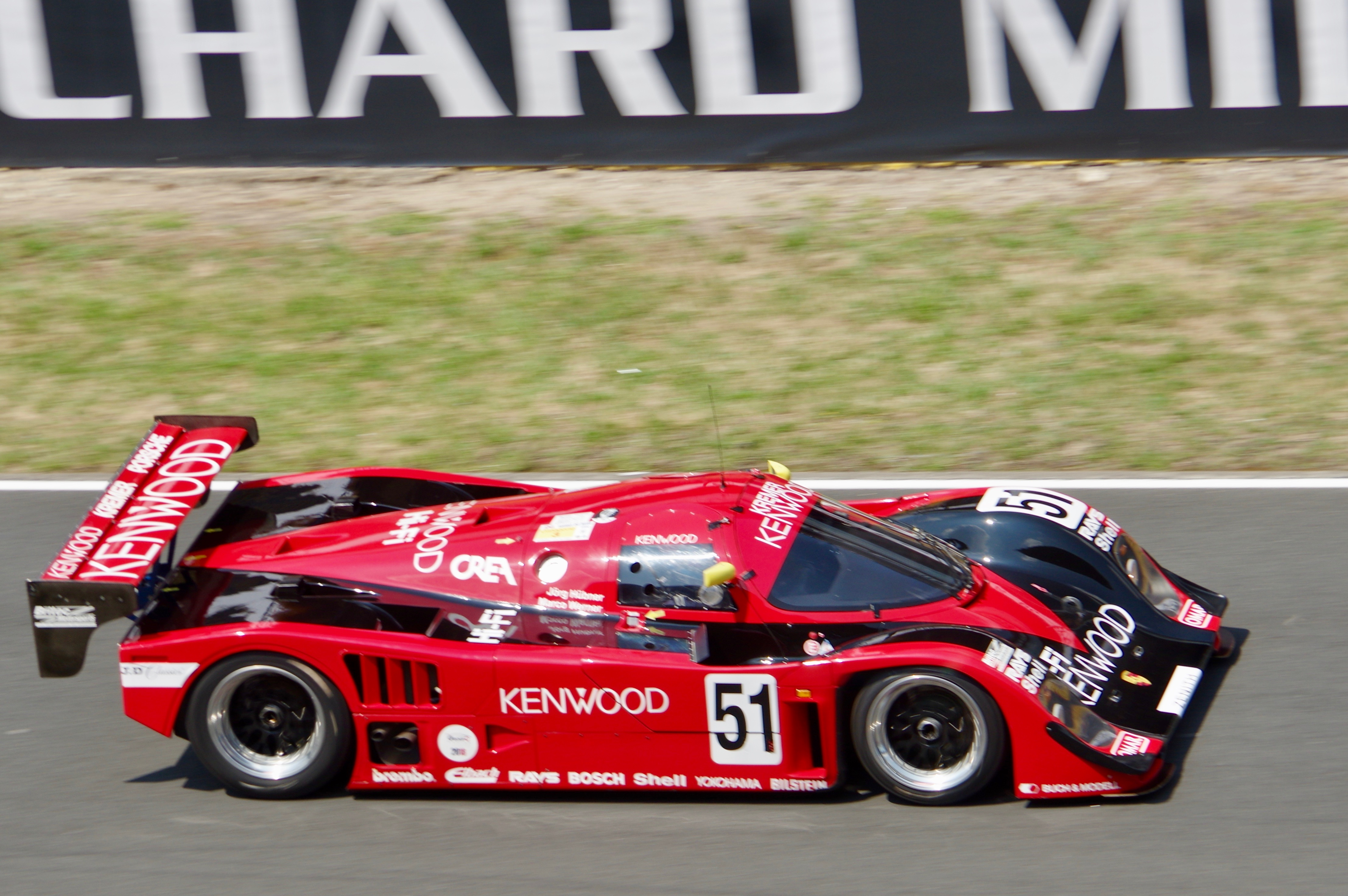
Kremer Brothers Porsche 962C-K6

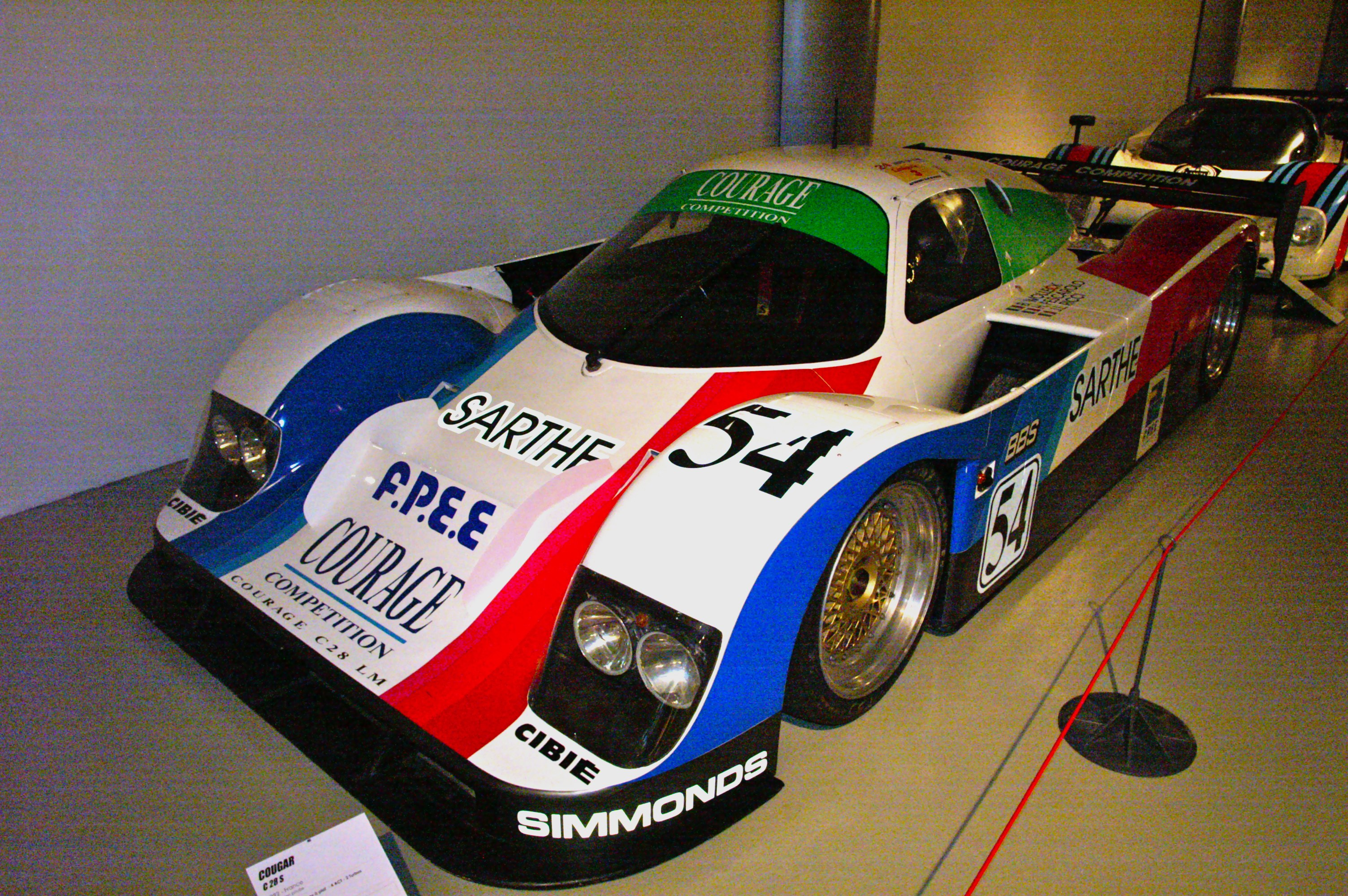
Cougar C28LM

To help pad out the field, FISA allowed the old turbo Group C cars (i.e. Porsches) to be entered under this Category 3. They were allowed a minimum weight back up to 900 kg, but their fuel allowance was slashed to only 2140 litres, effectively 4 hours of racing and neutering the challenge they could provide. FISA was adamant they would not upstage their Category 1 cars. Five Porsches accepted the challenge, all fitted with the 3.0-litre Porsche turbo engine to better manage their fuel consumption. The Kremer brothers had stayed loyal to the Sportscar Championship in 1991, when many teams walked away. This year they were competing in the German Interserie. They brought three cars of their CK6 variant, including a spare, to Le Mans this year. Their lead car had an experienced line-up: Le Mans winners John Nielsen (1990) and Manuel Reuter (1989) were joined by Giovanni Lavaggi. While the second car had Brits Robin Donovan and Charles Rickett with Italian Almo Coppelli. Hans Obermaier was also running in the Interserie but brought his composite-shell Porsche to Le Mans. At 1039 kg, it was the heaviest car in the field. The driver line-up was the same as the past two years, with co-owner Jürgen Lässig joined by Otto Altenbach and Primagaz concessionaire Pierre Yver.

The ADA Engineering team of Ian Harrower and Chris Crawford had previously competed in the junior C2 class. This year, they purchased a brand-new honeycomb-hull 962-GTi from the British conversion specialist company of Richard Lloyd's GTi Engineering, incorporating engineer Chris Crawford's personal improvements. The owners chose not to race themselves this time but put together a very strong British team of drivers. Derek Bell was enticed out of retirement to have the opportunity to race with his son Justin and they were joined by racer/TV presenter Tiff Needell. The other Porsche was that of the French Alméras brothers. A late entry, they had repaired their car after two crashes in last year's race and were boosted by a last-minute sponsorship package. Their co-driver was Moroccan Max Cohen-Olivar.

With their turbo-charged 3.0-litre Porsche engines, Courage Compétition was also eligible to be entered in Category 3. Yves Courage had three cars of his new C28LM model. Marcel Hubert had done further aerodynamic refinement on the honeycomb chassis, with a lower rear aerofoil behind a longer engine cover. The lead car had an all-French crew of incredible experience, with Henri Pescarolo (26th start) and Bob Wollek (22nd start) along with Jean-Louis Ricci, heir to the Nina Ricci fashion house.

=== Category 4 ===
The national trophy cars were only loosely Sports Cars, fitted as they were with a single, centre-mounted seat. Welter Racing was the successor to the small French WM-Peugeot team that had achieved Le Mans immortality in 1988 when they had broken the 400 kp/h mark on the Hunaudières straight. It was run by husband and wife, Gérard and Rachel Welter out of the former WM garages east of Paris, once WM co-owner Michel Meunier returned to Peugeot Talbot Sport. They had built an open-top racecar, the 905 Spyder, for a one-marque series in France. The simple aluminium space-frame chassis had a spec Peugeot engine – the 1.9-litre 4-cylinder motor taken from the Peugeot 405 Mi16, that could be tuned to put out 220 bhp. Modifications were required to make them suitable for endurance racing, including adding headlights, an alternator and a 70-litre fuel-tank. Another entry from the French local series was Eric Bellefroid in a modified Orion spyder. Updated by former Oreca engineer Jacky Renaud, and Jacky Carmignon, they styled their design the “RenCar”. The carbon-fibre chassis received a similar ‘makeover’ given to the WR. A concern was that of Bellefroid's drivers – Marc Alexander / Franck de Vita / Walter Breuer – only Alexander had actual racing experience, but the ACO was prepared to overlook that. With the British Pro-Car entries not making it Le Mans, the only other Category 4 entry was from Didier Bonnet. His Debora SP92 (a phonic abbreviation of Didier Bonnet Racing) was built with an aluminium hull, with pushrod suspension and a fibreglass bodyshell. Racing in the French Coupe Alfa Romeo series, it had the 3-litre V6 from the Alfa Romeo 164 Quadrifoglio Verde. With a Bosch Motronic engine-management system, it put out 220 bhp. Bonnet was co-driven by Gérard Tremblay and racing politician Jacques Heuclin.

== Practice and Qualifying ==
The absence of the British TWR Jaguars made for a notably smaller number of spectators for qualifying, particularly among the British. The France v Denmark football match in Euro’92 also keep the audience at home. With the smaller field, scrutineering was also quieter and it all meant the whole paddock area was that bit more subdued than usual. Peugeot had three T-cars, one for each squad to practice with. On the first morning, despite traffic Alliot was able to put in a blistering lap to set a time of 3:23.6, three seconds faster than Mark Blundell's 1990 pole lap in the super-turbo Nissan. Toyota took the hint and concentrated on their race set-up. In the cooler 10pm session, Peugeot gave Alliot a tweaked test-car on soft rubber and he was able to go even faster, setting an unbeatable 3:21.2. Just before midnight, Warwick took his Peugeot out and going for a hot-lap tried to undercut a Porsche but ended up in the gravel damaging its suspension.

Clear weather on Thursday allowed more quick times, but the nearest they could come to Alliot was Dalmas with a 3:22.8. Wendlinger in the third car was thwarted by electrical gremlins stopping him out on-track, then skated off the track in the night session to settle for 6th with a 3:31.3 from the first day. In contrast, the TOMs team had only a single T-car and bamboozled the stewards constantly changing its race-number as each driver-squad (legally) took a turn to set their race-times. With a #8, Lammers managed a 3:27.7, then a quick swap to #7 allowed Lees to pip his teammate with a 3:26.4 for third on the grid. As #33, Raphanel posted a 3:29.3 for 5th place. The Mazda team had a solid qualification, with Weidler setting the 7th best time with 3:34.3. The quickest turbo car was the Kremer Porsche in 8th, just ahead of Cor Euser in the Lola. The company had supplied a new, uprated transmission to Euro Racing, and Frentzen posted the fasted time in the Saturday warm-up session. The BRM had a difficult practice – losing the whole first day because a new differential arrived with no fitting-bolts, and then Taylor only got 6 laps on Thursday before a bearing failed. Toivonen and Jones did not get a chance to put any laps in at all. This meant, in theory, that Taylor would have to driver the whole race himself.

In the FIA Cup, it was the Spice of Bernard de Dryver that.was fastest, with a 3:58.6 getting them 21st on the grid, just ahead of the Chamberlain Spice. The Spice of Tim Lee-Davey sat in the garage all Wednesday as insurance was organised. Some lap-times were set by the drivers before Migault's sponsors “pulled the plug” and cancelled their funding. The team had no choice but to withdraw. Plagued by electrical problems, the ALD was packed up by Friday and never made it to the start-line. Alliot's Peugeot and Reuter's Kremer Porsche were both clocked at almost 350 kp/h, while the Toyota was doing 345 kp/h. This compared to 380 kp/h from Blundell's 1000+ bhp Nissan, showing the dramatic improvement in aerodynamics and downforce. The Category 4 WM and Debora were dangerously slower, at less than 250 kp/h, which caused quite some consternation among the leading cars, particularly when coming up behind them in the corners.

=== Qualifying results ===
Class leaders are in bold. The fastest time set by each entry is denoted in gray.

Pos.	Class	No.	Team	Qualifying 1	Qualifying 2	Gap
1	Category 1	2	**(France) Peugeot Talbot Sport**	**3:21.209**	3:33.585	
2	Category 1	1	(France) Peugeot Talbot Sport	3:29.166	3:22.512	+1.303
3	Category 1	7	(Japan) Toyota Team Tom's	3:30.950	3:26.411	+5.202
4	Category 1	8	(Japan) Toyota Team Tom's	3:40.163	3:27.711	+6.502
5	Category 1	33	(Japan) Toyota Team Tom's	3:35.528	3:29.300	+8,091
6	Category 1	31	(France) Peugeot Talbot Sport	3:31.250	3:35.539	+10.041
7	Category 1	5	(Japan) Mazdaspeed	3:36.856	3:34.329	+13.120
8	Category 3	51	**(Germany) Porsche Kremer Racing**	3:37.729	**3:36.317**	+15.108
9	Category 1	3	(Netherlands) Euro Racing	3:43.486	3:37.109	+15.900
10	Category 1	6	(Japan) Mazdaspeed	3:41.757	3:38.930	+17.721
11	Category 2	34	**(Japan) Kitz Racing Team with SARD**	**3:39.850**	3:50.566	+18.641
12	Category 1	4	(Netherlands) Euro Racing	3:56.886	3:40.207	+18.998
13	Category 3	54	(France) Courage Compétition	3:45.542	3:44.248	+23.039
14	Category 3	55	(France) Courage Compétition	3:54.029	3:44.888	+23.679
15	Category 2	35	(Japan) Trust Racing	3:45.086	3:44.984	+23.775
16	Category 3	67	(Germany) Obermaier Racing/ (France) Primagaz Compétition	3:51.283	3:47.723	+26.514
17	Category 3	53	(United Kingdom) ADA Engineering	3:55.436	3:51.150	+29.941
18	Category 3	52	(Germany) Porsche Kremer Racing	3:55.319	3:52.538	+31.329
19	Category 3	56	(France) Courage Compétition	4:02.674	3:55.765	+34.556
20	Category 3	68	(France) Team Alméras-Chotard	3:57.455	4:10.608	+36.246
21	Category 1 FIA Cup	21	(Italy) Action Formula	3:59.867	3:58.595	+37.386
22	Category 1 FIA Cup	22	(United Kingdom) Chamberlain Engineering/ (Netherlands) Euro Racing	4:00.014	4:04.827	+38.805
23	Category 1	9	(United Kingdom) BRM Motorsport	No Time	4:03.186	+41.977
24	Category 1 FIA Cup	36	(United Kingdom) Chamberlain Engineering/ (Netherlands) Euro Racing	4:44.302	4:05.538	+44.329
25	Category 1	30	(United Kingdom) Team TDR	No Time	4:09.296	+48.087
26	Category 1 FIA Cup	29	(Italy) Team S.C.I.	4:17.466	4:12.665	+51.456
27	Category 4	58	**(France) Welter Racing**	No Time	**4:28.693**	+1:07.484
28	Category 4	66	(France) Éric Bellefroid	5:13.392	4:46.715	+1:25.506
29	Category 4	61	(France) Didier Bonnet Racing	5:19.715	4:49.010	+1:27.801
30	Category 4	60	(France) Team MP Racing	5:47.453	5:06.789	+1:45.580

== Race ==
=== Start ===
The sunny weather over the week gave way to a miserable race-day. It drizzled all morning, during the warm-up session, but eased by the time the cars were eased onto the grid. However, it returned just as the cars were about to start their pace laps, causing confusion as several teams changed tyres at the last minute. Caught out still in the pits was the BRM. Honorary starter this year, was Prince Albert of Monaco, himself a well-known racing enthusiast. At the start, the two Peugeots scared their pit-crews as both cars dived toward the Dunlop Curve, neither giving way. Dalmas finally yielded to Alliot at the Esses. The cars all created big rooster-tails of spray down the Hunaudières straight making visibility very difficult. The early mover up the field was Volker Weidler – the Mazda was up to fourth by lap two, passed Lees for third on lap three. He then caught Dalmas on lap five, about 20 minutes into the race, when the latter ran wide at Mulsanne. The Peugeot repassed on the drag-race down to Indianapolis, but the Mazda's better performance in the curves in the wet retook the place at the Ford Chicane. Then, with a huge cheer from the grandstands, he did a bold pass for the lead at Tertre Rouge. Once again, the Peugeot blasted past on the straight but, once again, Weidler was able to pass at the Ford Chicane and hold onto the top place this time. Meanwhile, the Toyotas of Lees and Lammers were 4th and 5th, with Ferté and Raphanel next in the third of the Peugeots and Toyotas respectively. Raphanel stopped on lap 9, and Weidler came in on lap 11 with a 12-second lead. The SARD Toyota was the leading turbo, in 7th. The turbocharged cars were able to stay out a few laps longer than the atmos, and the wet weather helped on their fuel consumption. After starting from the pitlane, Taylor had got the BRM up to 17th position, but then the troublesome gearbox jammed spinning him off at the Ford Chicane costing many minutes trying to find a gear to limp across to the pits. Going into the second hour, Weidler and Dalmas were able to put a bit of a gap on the rest of the field. Baldi had swapped with Alliot and was closely pursued by teammate Ferté, and Lees. The treacherous conditions finally claimed a prize at 5.30pm. Lees had got past the third Peugeot, but lifted as he approached slower traffic at Tertre Rouge. Unsighted, Ferté ran straight into the back of him, sending both cars off into the barriers. Although badly damaged, amazingly both cars were able to crawl back to the pits. Lees had lost his engine cover and had wrecked rear suspension, while Ferté had a windscreen smashed by the Toyota's rear wing, and a broken front suspension. A quicker second refuel, and driver-change, got the Dalmas/Warwick Peugeot back into the lead over the Weidler/Herbert Mazda. Jabouille was third in the other Peugeot while the two Toyotas, now driven by Fabi and Acheson were fourth and fifth, about to go a lap down. It was apparent the Michelin wet-weather tyres of the Peugeots and Mazdas were handling the condition far better than the Goodyears on the Toyotas. Extraordinary pitwork got the two damaged cars back on the track in less than an hour, albeit a dozen laps down or so, driven by van der Poele and Brabham.

The track started drying as the rain eased in the third hour, and the cars switched over to intermediate tyres. However, it was still damp in patches and Brabham was caught out on oil, sliding into the tyre-barrier at Indianapolis necessitating another three-quarter hour of repairs. In the fourth hour, the track was completely dry and World Champion Teo Fabi started putting in very fast times as the Toyotas were finally able to get onto slicks and show their potential. Just before 9pm, the drizzle returned. All the new drivers lost time as they got into their cars and acclimatised to the difficult driving conditions. Jabouille passed Gachot in the Mazda for second as he settled into his race-pace. As darkness fell around the 6-hour mark the race-order was pretty stable. The slower lap-times were also putting less stress on the engines. The two Peugeots were about 2 minutes apart, ahead of the Mazda (all 87 laps) and the two Toyotas (85). The SARD Toyota was the best of the turbos, in sixth, chased hard by Wollek in the Cougar (84). The second Mazda was eighth (83) with its alternative, lower-slung rear wing making handling very tricky in the wet. The Kremer Porsche and Trust Toyota rounded out the top-10 (82 laps). The Euro Racing Lola-Judds were having issues with gear-selection. Pareja was left stranded at Indianapolis when his car's gearbox seized up, while Frentzen was being very quick when he wasn’t being delayed in the pits. Gearbox issues were also the bane of the BRM, although it was a pit-fire that finally ended its race at 9.45pm.

In the minor classes, the de Dryver Spice took an early lead, as the two Chamberlain cars were delayed. Iacobelli had gone off track at 6pm and wrecked the rear end. After the gearbox needed to be replaced later in the evening, they were 10 laps behind. The second car had repeated electronics issues and then a broken seat-mounting. The drivers also had episodes in the gravel that exasperated the team principal.

=== Night ===
The rain got heavier during the night and mist also came down as the temperature dropped. Visibility was low and cars sliding off the track were leaving gravel and oil on the track, making driving conditions treacherous. Andy Wallace, driving a Toyota, noted:

"I was following someone onto the straight. And he lifted. I was following his lights, so I came past and as I got alongside him, I could see nothing! So, we both went along at half speed in fourth gear. Then I thought I saw something, so I carried on. With the lights you just see the spray even more intensely."

With everyone driving carefully, it meant little action on the race-track as the leading cars just strove to get through the night and aim to pick up the pace in the morning. By the halfway point, at 4am, Dalmas/Warwick/Blundell had built a 2-lap, 10-minute, lead over their teammates. Alliot had had a power-steering failure that slid him off into the gravel at Indianapolis, losing a few minutes as he got pulled out. Twice, Herbert had to pit to get the windscreen replaced as it was fogging up so badly.

"It was very difficult. I had the screen totally gone, and the fog at the same time. I couldn’t actually see a thing. I was going down the straight zig-zagging, trying to find lines, and barriers and reflective bits. At the kinks I was going straight on and turning in at the last minute. I didn’t enjoy that at all."

However, back in the pack, other cars were having problems: at 12.20am Max Cohen-Olivar crashed the Alméras Frères Porsche at the second chicane on the back straight, ending their race. Five minutes later, the Trust Toyota of Stefan Johansson came to a stop on the track with a broken gear linkage. He was finally able to jam it into a gear and made it back to the pits, without the engine cover. Worse luck was for the second Mazda, that had made its way past the turbo cars up to sixth. At 1:15 Yojiro Terada had a major accident when he aquaplaned off at the Porsche Curves, damaging the front suspension. Breaking the starter motor, he was unable to get going again and was out, having also suffered a mild concussion. At half distance, nothing had changed at the front of the field, however Irvine pitted the SARD Toyota with clutch problems. The time taken to replace the master cylinder moved the Pescarolo/Wollek/Ricci Courage up to be the leading turbo.

=== Morning ===
As dawn approached, the rain finally eased again, and the track began to dry. Getting back onto slicks, the pace of the Toyotas picked up again. They were making progress when their leading car, running fourth, pitted at 5:40am with its engine sounding rough. Three-quarters of an hour later, Alliot pitted the second Peugeot with more engine issues. The door was also giving trouble and was removed. Alliot drove out without a replacement, but when Toyota protested the safety of that to officials, he had to pit again to fix it. Alliot was having a difficult stint, having slid off the track twice, doing damage to the car that delayed them with more repairs. When the Mazda was held up investigating gearbox issues, the Toyota of Raphanel/Acheson/Sekiya nipped into second. The three Japanese cars were now on the same lap together as the day warmed up at breakfast-time, all were putting in very fast laps in the drying conditions. The de Dryver Spice had built a huge 24-lap lead over their opposition through the night, running as high as 13th overall. However, as the sun came up, they were thwarted by an ignition failure. At the time, both the Chamberlain cars were stationery in the pits, but the class win fell into the lap of their lap with them being the only two cars left running.

At 7:42am, a big cloud of smoke at Tertre Rouge indicated major engine problems for the recovering Toyota. Katayama had to crawl slowly back to the pits, and by a strange co-incidence, passed the #31 Peugeot that Lees had been shunted by the evening before. Van der Poele was stopped on track, with the engine cover off. But for both cars the damage was terminal and they retired from 10th and 11th within minutes of each other. Half an hour later, Andy Wallace brought the third-placed Toyota in with a puncture. He had had a huge moment approaching the Indianapolis kink when the right rear let go at over 300 kp/h. Fabi took over the driving but after a short stint had to pit with a broken clutch, necessitating a full rear-end change.

Through all this mayhem, Warwick/Blundell/Dalmas had been sailing on serenely, building up a 25-minute lead. Then, suddenly at 8:45am, Warwick coasted to a stop on the Hunaudières straight. The ignition cut out three times, but by flicking the master-switch he managed to get back to his alarmed crew. The time spent in the pits swapping out the electronics packs dropped the lead down to 14 minutes (3 laps). In the improving weather, the leading cars were pushing hard, but that in turn led to mistakes being made: Herbert had several episodes with loose bodywork then lost 20 minutes replacing a holed radiator. Alliot had already slid the second-placed Peugeot off the track several times, and when Baldi went off at Indianapolis, yet another nose-section was required to be fitted. At 10am, with 6 hours to go, the Warwick/Blundell/Dalmas Peugeot (260 laps) had a 16-minute, 4-lap lead over the Toyota (256), with the second Peugeot in third, two laps back. The Mazda was fourth (247), but stationary in the pits, and about to be passed by the Cougar and the Kremer Porsche, all on the same lap. The Trust turbo-Toyota was leading Category 2 in 7th (244) with a good 6-lap margin over the SARD Toyota (9th – 238). Splitting them was the second works Toyota (242) of Lammers/Wallace/Fabi. There was a big gap back to the second Kremer car in 10th (219 laps).

=== Finish and post-race ===
This pattern continued on toward midday, with periodic misfires, gearbox and engine problems thwarting the attempts of the leading cars to string together a reliable driving stint. So, what would normally be expected to be a gentle run to the finish was instead replaced by nervous, anxious pit-crews, just waiting for the next problem to afflict them. After the second car's demise, Sandro Sala was swapped into the remaining Mazda, with the tall Gachot having found the cramped cockpit a very uncomfortable experience. Lammers was flying in the oft-delayed Toyota, setting the fastest lap of the race. Yet his great work was undone when, successively, Wallace and Fabi could not get the car to re-start after their pit-stops. Slipping down the order they eventually finished 8th, 21 laps behind the winner. Derek Warwick was given the honour to bring the leading Peugeot home. Yet again, the unruly crowd surged over the barriers and blocked the track so he could not officially take the chequered flag, as the cars got diverted to the park fermé instead. Kenny Acheson nursed his overheating Toyota to second, keeping the rapidly closing Peugeot of Mauro Baldi at arm's length to get home by half a lap. His co-driver, Masanori Sekiya, became the first Japanese to claim a Le Mans outright podium. Sandro Sala brought the Mazda home to finish fourth, after battling gear-selection problems in the latter part of the race. Finishing without first, third and sixth gear, they were 16 laps behind the winners, but their competitive driving during the majority of the race proved their victory the year before was no fluke. The race to be the first turbocharged car home, went right down to the wire. After a reliable run in the second half of the race, Fouché, in the Trust Toyota, pushed really hard and caught Bob Wollek's Courage with just 15 minutes to go, to take fifth place, and finished only a minute behind the Mazda. The Kremer Porsche was 7th, just a lap behind after having to ease off to conserve fuel. Hugh Chamberlain's cars had only finished once previously at Le Mans, so having both cars come home was a great reward. Granted, the Japanese-driven car had only completed 160 laps and could not be classified. Piper's car, by dint of being the last car running was the class winner. Of the three Category 4 national trophy cars, only one was still running at the end. The Debora was out early after several spins and the clutch packed up; the WR fell as night fell with broken suspension. It was only Orion spyder that endured – after needing an engine rebuild from a blown gasket, and rear suspension repair, it was always trailing at the back of the field. Although running after 24 hours, it had completed barely a thousand kilometres (78 laps) and could not be classified.

This was the first victory for a V10 car and it was also the first for a French manufacturer since the very popular win for Le Mans local Jean Rondeau in 1980. They had led since the second hour and were trouble-free aside from a short electrical issue. Despite the small field, and absence of the big European works teams, the race had been full of drama and interest. Reliability was far better than many expected and the rain had reduced the maximum speeds, which helped the “atmo” engines survive, as well as easing the fuel economy of the turbos. The Mazda pitcrew got a special prize from the ACO for changing out a broken gear lever, holed radiator and faulty hub in less than an hour for Johnny Herbert. However, at the end of season Mazda cancelled the MRX project. It was the end of the road for Charles Zwolsman. Already convicted of drug-smuggling, eight days later he was picked up for speeding by Dutch police. As a bail violation, he was sent back to prison. The team was wound up in September and the assets sold off, effectively scuttling Lola's plan as a customer-car builder.

The ACO had lost a lot of money on this running of the race and 48 hours after its end, Michel Cosson, head of the ACO, announced their intention not to apply to be in the World Championship and its prohibitive restrictions in 1993. The promised TV coverage had been minimal on the mainstream channels. With the limited interest in the series, the FIA abbreviated the 1992 SWC season – from an international series of 10 rounds it was slashed back to just five European rounds and a sole “flyaway” event at Suzuka. Critics were scathing of the handling of World Sportscars by the FIA and sceptical about the future of the Sportscar World Championship. With minimal regular opposition, Ferdinand de Lesseps and his Chamberlain Engineering Spice won every round and was crowned the one, and only, FIA Cup Champion. As the abbreviated series wound down, it was patently obvious that this was the end of organised sports-car racing for the foreseeable future.

== Official results ==
=== Finishers ===
Results taken from Quentin Spurring's book, officially licensed by the ACO
Class Winners are in Bold text.

Pos	Class	No.	Team	Drivers	Chassis	Engine	Tyre	Laps
1	**Category 1**	**1**	**(France) Peugeot Talbot Sport**	**(United Kingdom) Derek Warwick** **(France) Yannick Dalmas** **(United Kingdom) Mark Blundell**	Peugeot 905B Evo 1-bis	Peugeot SA35-A2 3.5L V10	M	352
2	Category 1	33	(Japan) Toyota Team TOM'S GB	(Japan) Masanori Sekiya (France) Pierre-Henri Raphanel (United Kingdom) Kenny Acheson	Toyota TS010	Toyota RV10 3.5L V10	G	346
3	Category 1	2	(France) Peugeot Talbot Sport	(Italy) Mauro Baldi (France) Philippe Alliot (France) Jean-Pierre Jabouille	Peugeot 905B Evo 1-bis	Peugeot SA35-A2 3.5L V10	M	345
4	Category 1	5	(Japan) Mazdaspeed	(United Kingdom) Johnny Herbert (West Germany) Volker Weidler (Belgium) Bertrand Gachot (Brazil) Maurizio Sandro Sala	Mazda MXR-01	Mazda-Judd MV10 3.5L V10	M	336
5	**Category 2**	**35**	**(Japan) Trust Racing Team** **(Japan) Toyota Kitz Racing**	**(Sweden) Stefan Johansson** **(South Africa) George Fouché** **(Sweden) Steven Andskär**	Toyota 92C-V	Toyota R36V 3.6L V8 turbo	D	336
6	**Category 3**	**54**	**(France) Courage Compétition**	**(France) Bob Wollek** **(France) Henri Pescarolo** **(France) Jean-Louis Ricci**	Courage C28LM	Porsche 935 3.0L F6 twin turbo	G	335
7	Category 3	51	(Germany) Porsche Kremer Racing	(West Germany) Manuel Reuter (Denmark) John Nielsen (Italy) Giovanni Lavaggi	Porsche 962C-K6	Porsche 935 3.0L F6 twin turbo	Y	334
8	Category 1	8	(Japan) Toyota Team TOM'S GB	(Netherlands) Jan Lammers (United Kingdom) Andy Wallace (Italy) Teo Fabi	Toyota TS010	Toyota RV10 3.5L V10	G	331
9	Category 2	34	(Japan) SARD (Japan) Toyota Kitz Racing	(Austria) Roland Ratzenberger (Sweden) Eje Elgh (United Kingdom) Eddie Irvine	Toyota 92C-V	Toyota R36V 3.6L V8 turbo	B	321
10	Category 3	67	(West Germany) Obermaier Racing (France) Primagaz Compétition	(West Germany) Otto Altenbach (West Germany) Jürgen Lässig (France) Pierre Yver	Porsche 962C	Porsche 935 3.0L F6 twin turbo	G	297
11	Category 3	52	(West Germany) Porsche Kremer Racing	(Italy) Almo Coppelli (United Kingdom) Robin Donovan (United Kingdom) Charles Rickett	Porsche 962C-K6	Porsche 935 3.0L F6 twin turbo	Y	297
12	Category 3	53	(United Kingdom) ADA Engineering (private entrant)	(United Kingdom) Derek Bell (United Kingdom) Justin Bell (United Kingdom) Tiff Needell	Porsche 962C GTi	Porsche 935/83 3.0L F6 twin turbo	G	284
13	Category 1	4	(Netherlands) Euro Racing	(Netherlands) Charles Zwolsman (West Germany) Heinz-Harald Frentzen (Japan) Shunji Kasuya	Lola T92/10	Judd GV10 3.5L V10	M	271
14	Category 1 FIA Cup	22	(United Kingdom) Chamberlain Engineering (Netherlands) Euro Racing	(France) Ferdinand de Lesseps (United Kingdom) Richard Piper (France) Olindo Iacobelli	Spice SE89C	Cosworth DFZ 3.5L V8	G	258
NC*	Category 1 FIA Cup	36	(United Kingdom) Chamberlain Engineering (Netherlands) Euro Racing	(Japan) Jun Harada (Japan) Kenta Shimamura (Japan) Tomiko Yoshikawa	Spice SE89C	Cosworth DFZ 3.5L V8	G	160
NC*	Category 4	66	(France) Éric Bellefroid (private entrant)	(France) Walter Breuer (France) Marc Alexandre (France) Frank de Vita	Orion 905 Spyder	Peugeot MI16 1930cc S4	M	78

- Note *: Not Classified for failing to cover sufficient distance (70% of the winner) by the race's end.

=== Did not finish ===
Pos	Class	No	Team	Drivers	Chassis	Engine	Tyre	Laps	Reason
DNF	Category 1	31	(France) Peugeot Talbot Sport	(Austria) Karl Wendlinger (Belgium) Eric van de Poele (France) Alain Ferté	Peugeot 905B Evo 1-bis	Peugeot SA35-A2 3.5L V10	M	208	Engine (17hr)
DNF	Category 1	7	(Japan) Toyota Team TOM'S GB	(United Kingdom) Geoff Lees (Australia) David Brabham (Japan) Ukyo Katayama	Toyota TS010	Toyota RV10 3.5L V10	G	192	Engine (16hr)
DNF	Category 1 FIA Cup	21	(Italy) Action Formula (private entrant)	(Italy) Luigi Taverna (Italy) Alessandro Gini (United Kingdom) John Sheldon	Spice SE90C	Cosworth DFR 3.5L V8	G	150	Electrics (15hr)
DNF	Category 3	56	(France) Courage Compétition	(Spain) Tomás Saldaña (France) Denis Morin (France) Jean-François Yvon	Courage C28LM	Porsche 935 3.0L F6 twin turbo	G	142	Engine (12hr)
DNF	Category 1	6	(Japan) Mazdaspeed	(Brazil) Maurizio Sandro Sala (Japan) Takashi Yorino (Japan) Yojiro Terada	Mazda MXR-01	Mazda-Judd MV10 3.5L V10	M	124	Accident (11hr)
DNF	Category 1 FIA Cup	29	(Italy) Team S.C.I. (private entrant)	(Italy) Ranieri Randaccio (Italy) Vito Veninata (Italy) "Stingbrace" (Stefano Sebastiani)	Tiga GC288/9	Cosworth DFL 3.3L V8	G	101	Gearbox (13hr)
DNF	Category 3	68	(France) Team Alméras-Chotard (private entrant)	(France) Jean-Marie Alméras (France) Jacques Alméras (Morocco) Max Cohen-Olivar	Porsche 962C	Porsche 935 3.0L F6 twin turbo	G	85	Accident (9hr)
DNF	Category 3	55	(France) Courage Compétition	(France) Pascal Fabre (France) Lionel Robert (Italy) Marco Brand	Cougar C28LM	Porsche 935 3.0L F6 twin turbo	G	77	Accident (6hr)
DNF	Category 1	3	(Netherlands) Euro Racing	(Netherlands) Charles Zwolsman (Netherlands) Cor Euser (Spain) Jesús Pareja	Lola T92/10	Judd GV10 3.5L V10	M	50	Gearbox (7hr)
DNF	Category 4	58	(France) Welter Racing	(France) Patrick Gonin (France) Didier Artzet (France) Pierre Petit	WR 905 Spyder	Peugeot MI16 1930cc S4	M	42	Suspension (7hr)
DNF	Category 4	61	(France) Didier Bonnet Racing (private entrant)	(France) Didier Bonnet (France) Gérard Tremblay (France) Jacques Heuclin	Debora SP92	Alfa Romeo 164QF 3.0L V6	P	25	Transmission (3hr)
DNF	Category 1	9	(United Kingdom) BRM Motorsport	(South Africa) Wayne Taylor (Finland) Harri Toivonen (United Kingdom) Richard Jones	BRM P351	BRM-Weslake 290 3.5L V12	G	20	Fire (6hr)

=== Did not start ===
Pos	Class	No	Team	Drivers	Chassis	Engine	Tyre	Reason
DNS	Category 1	30	(United Kingdom) Team TDR (private entrant)	(United Kingdom) Chris Hodgetts (France) François Migault (France) Thierry Lecerf	Spice SE90C	Cosworth DFR 3.5L V8	**D**	Failed scrutineering
DNQ	Category 2	60	(France) Team MP Racing (private entrant)	(France) Marc Pachot (France) Raymond Touroul (France) Didier Cadarec	ALD C289/90	Peugeot PRV 3.0L V6	**M**	Failed scrutineering underweight
DNA	Category 1	10	(United Kingdom) BRM Motorsport		BRM P351	BRM-Weslake 290 3.5L V12	**G**	Did not arrive
DNA	Category 1	11	(Austria) Konrad Motorsport	(Austria) Franz Konrad	Konrad KM-011	Lamborghini LE3512 3.5L V12		Did not arrive
DNA	Category 1	12	(United Kingdom) RM Motorsport		Jaguar XJR-14	Ford-Cosworth HB 3.5L V8		Did not arrive
DNA	Category 1	14	(United Kingdom) RM Motorsport		Jaguar XJR-14	Ford-Cosworth HB 3.5L V8		Did not arrive
DNA	Category 1 FIA Cup	27	(United Kingdom) RM Motorsport		Spice SE90C	Cosworth DFZ 3.5L V8		Did not arrive
DNA	Category 1 FIA Cup	28	(United Kingdom) RM Motorsport		Jaguar XJR-17	Jaguar JRV-6 3.5L V6		Did not arrive
DNA	Category 1 FIA Cup	38	(United Kingdom) Chamberlain Engineering (Switzerland) Gee Pee Motorsport	(Italy) Ranieri Randaccio (Italy) Pasquale Barberio	Jaguar XJR-17	Jaguar JRV-6 3.5L V6		Did not arrive
DNA	Category 2	23	(Switzerland) Gee Pee Motorsport	(United Kingdom) Dave Coyne (Switzerland) Georg Paulin (Italy) "Stingbrace" (Stefano Sebastiani)	Jaguar XJR-12LM	Jaguar HE 7.4L V12		Did not arrive
DNA	Category 4	57	(France) Welter Racing	(France) Patrick Gonin	WR 905 Spyder	Peugeot M16 1930cc S4	**M**	Did not arrive
DNA	Category 4	59	(France) Del Bello Racing (private entrant)	(France) Noël del Bello (France) Theirry Lecerf	Norma M7	Alfa Romeo 164QF 3.0L V6		Did not arrive
DNA	Category 4	64	(United Kingdom) Pro-Sport Engineering	(United Kingdom) Ian Ashley (United Kingdom) John Morrison (United Kingdom) Tony Trimmer	ProSport LM3000	Cosworth FBA 3.0L V6		Did not arrive
DNA	Category 4	65	(United Kingdom) Pro-Sport Engineering	(United Kingdom) Nick Adams (United Kingdom) John Sheldon (United Kingdom) Rob Murrells	ProSport LM3000	Cosworth FBA 3.0L V6		Did not arrive
DNA	Category 4	62	(United Kingdom) Martin Crass Racing (private entrant)	(United Kingdom) Chris Hodgetts	ProSport LM3000	Cosworth FBA 3.0L V6		Did not arrive
DNA	Category 4	63	(United Kingdom) Don Farthing Racing (private entrant)		ProSport LM3000	Cosworth FBA 3.0L V6		Did not arrive

=== Class winners ===
Class	Winning car	Winning drivers
Category 1	#1 Peugeot 905 Evo 1-bis	Warwick / Blundell / Dalmas
Category 2	#35 Toyota 92C-V	Johansson / Fouché / Andskär
Category 3	#54 Cougar C28LM	Wollek / Pescarolo / Ricci
Category 4		no classified finishers
Note *: setting a new class distance record for the circuit.

=== Statistics ===
Taken from Quentin Spurring's book, officially licensed by the ACO

- Pole Position – P. Alliot, #2 Peugeot 905 Evo 1-bis - 3:21.2secs; 243.3 km/h (151.2 mph)
- Fastest Lap – J. Lammers, #8 Toyota TS010 - 3:32.3secs; 230.6 km/h (143.3 mph)
- Winning Distance – 4,787.20 km (2,974.63 mi)
- Winner's Average Speed – 199.3 km/h (123.8 mph)
- Attendance – 176,000

== Notes ==
World Sportscar Championship
Previous race: 1992 500km of Silverstone	1992 season	Next race: 1992 500km of Donington
