= Andros Sport 01 =

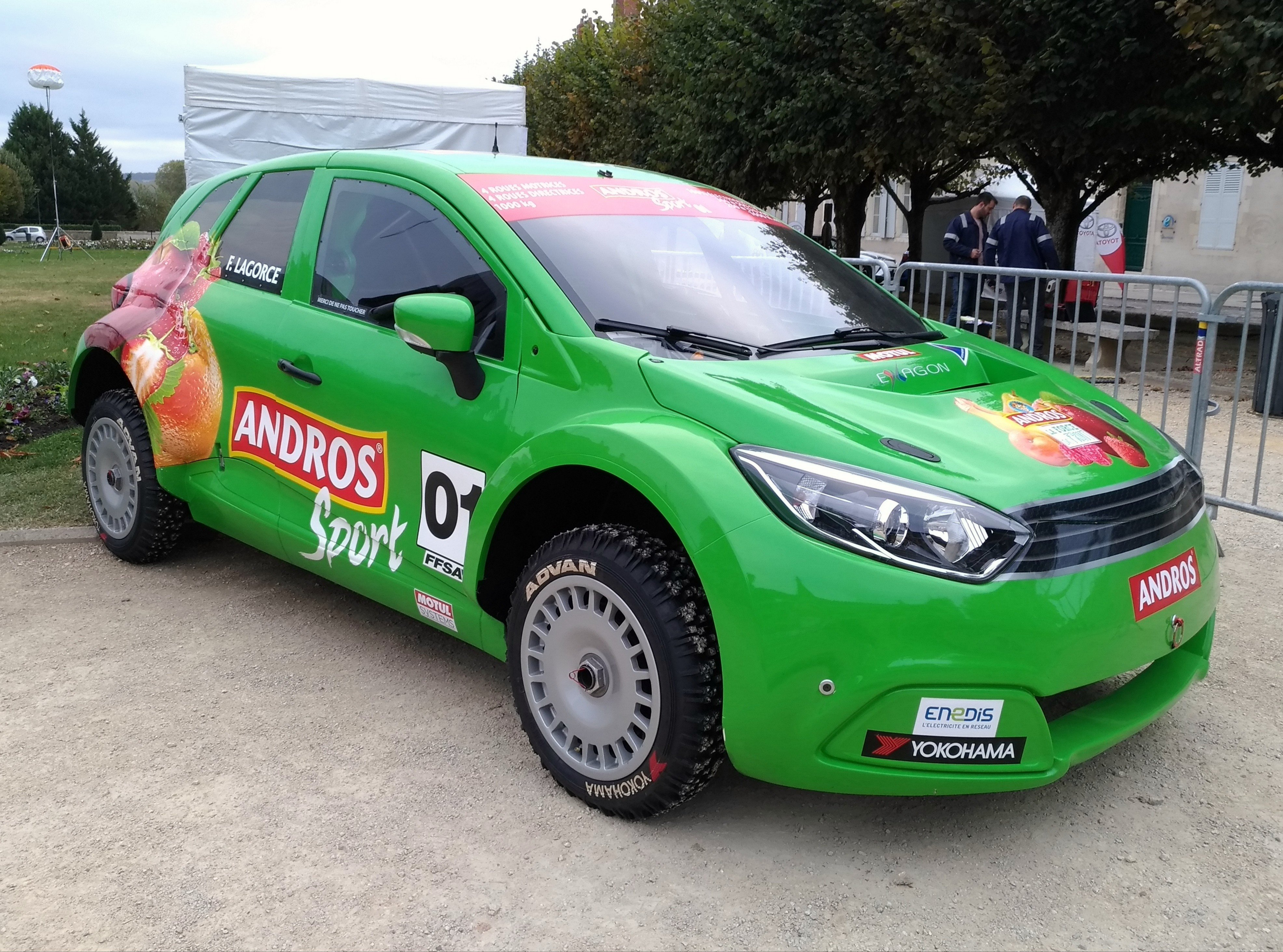

Overview
- Manufacturer: Exagon Engineering

Body and chassis
- Layout: Tubular spaceframe with four-wheel drive and four-wheel steering

Powertrain
- Transmission: Single-speed gearbox; no clutch
- Hybrid drivetrain: Twin‑motor setup producing ~300–340 hp (some versions capped by FFSA at 300 hp, with potential up to 500 hp) and 1,600 Nm of torque from 0–2,500 rpm

Dimensions
- Curb weight: Approximately 1,000 kg dry

The Andros Sport 01 EV was conceived as the first 100% electric car for the Andros Trophy ice‑racing championship in France. Its debut marked a pivotal moment as electric prototypes were finally allowed to compete directly alongside traditional combustion-powered cars in the Elite Pro category starting 2018.

== Overview ==
The battery pack uses a liquid‐immersion cooling system with non‑conductive coolant developed by Motul. This design improves thermal management and power delivery. The coolant team pioneered one of only four welders worldwide capable of assembling such packs.

== Racing ==
- January 2018: First test laps at Serre‑Chevalier, with drivers including Nicolas Prost, Franck Lagorce, and Aurélien Panis. The prototype was soon confirmed for full competition.
- December 2018: In the opening Ice‑Racing round at Val Thorens, Aurélien Panis won the event driving an electric car against ICE competitors.
- 2019 Season: Electric Sport 01s raced directly with thermal cars, with Lagorce setting new lap records in testing.

== Legacy ==
By 2020, the Andros Trophy became fully electric in its Elite Pro category, owing much to the success of the Sport 01. Beyond racing, the project served as a live testing ground for EV technology (power delivery, battery cooling, lightweight materials, and electric drivetrain behavior in extreme conditions).
