= Michel Cosson =

French businessman (1931–2022)

- Born: 4 August 1931
- Died: 11 June 2022 (aged 90)
- Education: Supélec
- Occupation: Businessman

Michel Cosson (4 August 1931 – 11 June 2022) was a French businessman. He was Director-General of Les Mutuelles du Mans Assurances from 1986 to 1992 and President of the Automobile Club de l'Ouest (ACO) from 1992 to 2003. A prominent figure in motor racing, he was known for aiding the financial recovery of the 24 Hours of Le Mans in the 1990s and the creation of similar competitions abroad.

== Biography ==
Cosson graduated from Supélec in 1955 with a degree in economics. He began his career with ONERA before becoming President of the Club des Nageurs du Mans from 1965 to 1975. He was Director-General of Défense Automobile et Sportive from 1981 to 1993 and of Mutuelles du Mans from 1986 to 1992.

When Cosson became President of ACO in 1992, it was facing major difficulties. As an association under the French law of 1901, ACO required a debt moratorium due to the installation of the Circuit de la Sarthe, which led the club to accumulate debts of 85 million francs. He collaborated with local and regional authorities to implement agreements on the repayment of debt. In 2001, a Syndicat Mixte took over the circuit's installations, therefore saving the 24 Hours of Le Mans event.

In the early 1990s, the Fédération Internationale de l'Automobile (FIA) decided to end the World Sportscar Championship. This led the ACO to require its own recruitment of car manufacturers. After great pressure, the FIA and the ACO created the FIA World Endurance Championship in 2012.

After discussions with Don Panoz, Cosson created the Petit Le Mans in 1998. This race was the starting point for the American Le Mans Series, which was followed by the birth of the European Le Mans Series and the Asian Le Mans Series. After discussions with Claude Michy, the French motorcycle Grand Prix was raced at Le Mans beginning in 2000. After further discussions with Peter Auto, the Le Mans Classic was started in 2002. At a local level, Michel Cosson created the departmental commissions of the ACO.

Michel Cosson died on 11 June 2022 at the age of 90.

== Distinctions ==
- Knight of the Ordre national du Mérite
- Knight of the Ordre des Palmes académiques
