= BRM P351 =

Prototype racing automobile

- Category: Sports car racing
- Constructor: British Racing Motors; Mangoletsi Enterprises
- Designer: (United Kingdom) Paul Brown

Technical specifications
- Chassis: Carbon monocoque
- Suspension (front): Unequal length double wishbone
- Suspension (rear): Unequal length double wishbone
- Engine: BRM (Weslake) 3500cc V12. Naturally aspirated mid-mounted
- Transmission: BRM 6-speed manual transmission
- Tyres: Goodyear

Competition history
- Notable entrants: (United Kingdom) British Racing Motors
- Notable drivers: (South Africa) Wayne Taylor (Finland) Harri Toivonen (United Kingdom) Richard Jones
- Debut: 1992 500km of Silverstone
- Last season: 1992
Races	Wins	Poles	F/Laps
3	0	0	0
- Constructors' Championships: 0
- Drivers' Championships: 0

The BRM P351 was originally a Group C sports-prototype built for the 1992 World Sportscar Championship season in an attempt to resurrect the British Racing Motors marque. The car later reappeared in a heavily modified form in 1997 as a Le Mans Prototype known as the BRM P301 before retiring completely in 1998.

Only one chassis was ever built.

The project was also connected to the failed BRM P401 sports car which would have shared some elements of the P351 race car. BRM P351 designer Paul Brown completed the drawings and a full-size cockpit was manufactured by Motor Panels. However, with the ending of the race programme, the P401 project was shelved.

== Development ==
In 1990, an agreement was reached between entrepreneur John Mangoletsi and the family of British Racing Motors (BRM) founder Alfred Owen, who had retained the naming rights to the company even after it had ceased to exist. The use of the BRM name would help Mangoletsi's project gain sponsorship and funding by appearing as a manufacturer entry against the likes of Toyota, Peugeot and Mazda in the World Sportscar Championship.

With the backing of BRM, Mangoletsi turned to former Zakspeed chief engineer Paul Brown to design the car. Brown was employed at the time by Airflow Management and had extensive experience of state-of-the-art sportscar design, having previously been involved with update work on the Porsche 962 for Porsche Motorsport North America and a sportscar project for General Motors that did not come to fruition. Brown produced a conventional carbon composite monocoque Group C chassis, which although technically unremarkable was well regarded by those who drove it for its excellent handling. The composite chassis of the car was constructed for the team by the engineering firm Courtaulds and finished in a metallic british racing green with BRM's traditional orange nose. The engine was designed by Graham Dale-Jones and built by Terry Hoyle's JHS company using a block derived from the Weslake V12 Grand Prix unit. It was branded as a 'BRM'. Claimed output was 626 hp (467 kW) at 11300 rpm but it proved to be uncompetitive and unreliable. Dale-Jones virtually redesigned the V12 which actually exceeded its performance targets and further validation work on the engine was carried out by Ricardo Engineering.

A model of the BRM P351 was exhibited at the Autosport Racing Car Show in January 1991 and the complete car was unveiled in London’s Science Museum in November of 1991.

A second chassis was planned to be completed in order to start the 1992 season but was never built.

== Racing history ==
The car had a brief test at Snetterton, where no more than 30 laps were completed.

The BRM P351 debuted at the 1992 500km of Silverstone, the second round of the World Sportscar Championship. The drivers assigned were Wayne Taylor and Harri Toivonen. After problems in qualifying with a battery, the car was forced to take the last qualifying position. Unfortunately, the car suffered more problems on Sunday when during pre-race warm-up the oil pump failed and the car never took the race start.

The team moved next to the 24 Hours of Le Mans, where Richard Jones was added to the driver line-up. On both days of qualifying the car suffered transmission difficulties, with Wayne Taylor being the only driver to set a time. This was however good enough for 23rd place in the field of 29. However yet again problems struck early for the P351. Although the car did make the start, it suffered transmission failure after a mere twenty laps, the first car out of the race.

In an attempt to find sponsorship elsewhere, the team transferred the P351 to the United States to participate in an IMSA Camel GT round at Watkins Glen International. Although the team had checked in advance that the chassis was compliant with IMSA regulations, the track at Watkins Glen was not as smooth as the European tracks it had previously raced on and BRM were forced to raise the ride height. This made the car taller than IMSA regulations allowed, causing a crisis with only an hour left until scrutineering. At the suggestion of designer Paul Brown, the car's tall roof-mounted intake was removed with a Sawzall, split down the middle and remounted with the two halves of the intake on their sides, forming a new intake with the same cross-section and lowering the car enough to meet the regulations. Unfortunately the car still suffered from its poor reliability record, succumbing to electrical failure after a mere five laps.

After these three failed race attempts, money for the project was beginning to run out as sponsorship was not forthcoming. The team returned the P351 to Europe and entered the next World Sportscar Championship round at Donington Park, but never appeared. After this, the team pulled out of the World Sportscar Championship for good and the team folded.

To satisfy the team and all the industry supporters, team manager Ian Dawson carried out a 1,000-mile test to prove the true capabilities of the P351. A new camshaft profile was developed to address the only observation in all of Ricardo’s tests that valve spring surge could occur between 10,500 and 11,000 rpm. By this time all the relatively minor problems that had been encountered, primarily with bought-in ancillary components, had been resolved and the car ran faultlessly.

The BRM was returned to Rubery Owen who kept it in storage for three years.

== P301 ==
BRM P301
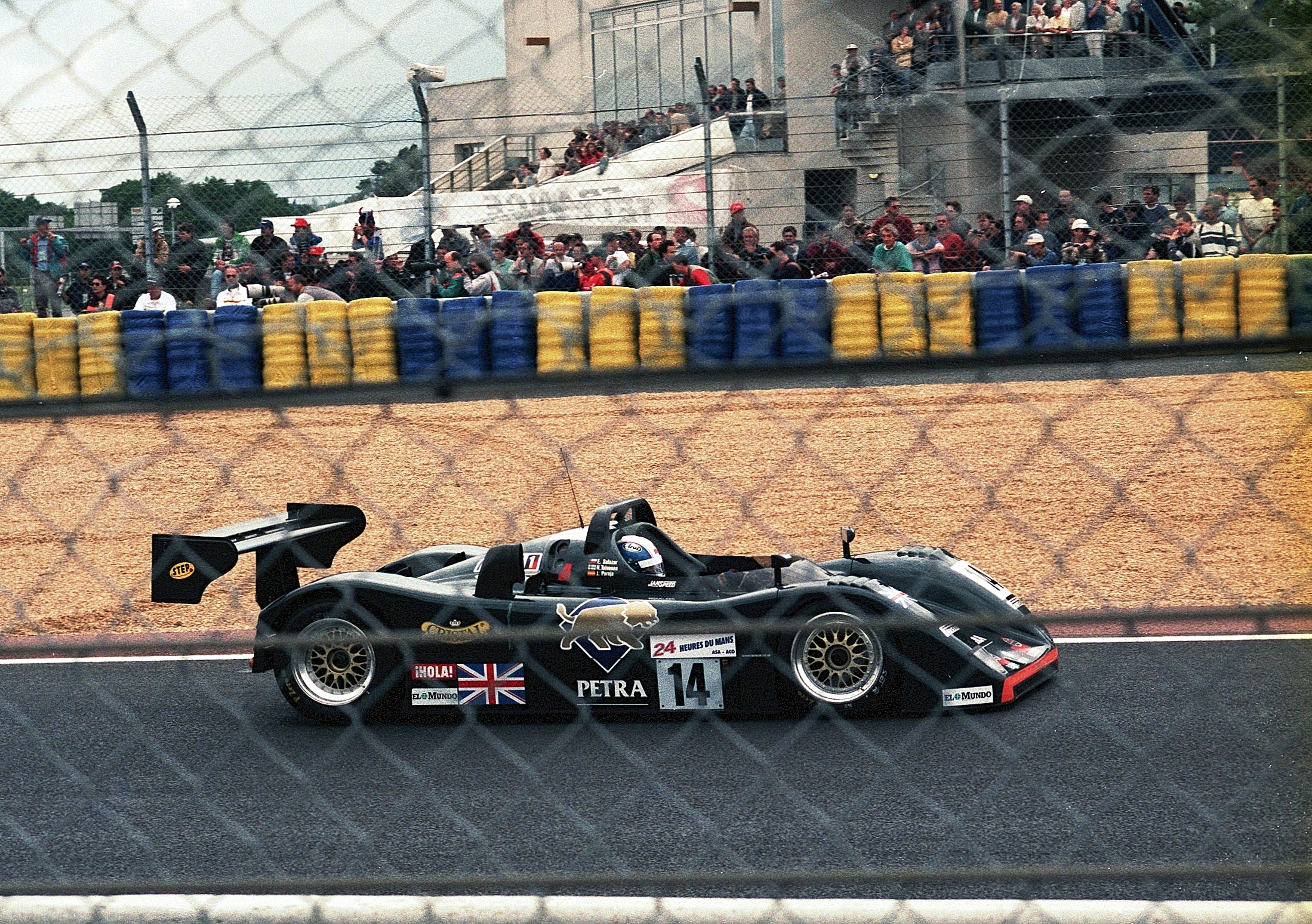
- Category: Sports car racing
- Constructor: British Racing Motors; Pilbeam Racing Designs

Technical specifications
- Chassis: Carbon monocoque
- Suspension (front): Unequal length double wishbone
- Suspension (rear): Unequal length double wishbone
- Engine: Nissan 3000cc V6. twin-turbocharged mid-mounted
- Transmission: 6-speed manual transmission
- Tyres: Pirelli (1997); Dunlop (1998)

Competition history
- Notable entrants: (United Kingdom) Pacific Racing
- Notable drivers: (Austria) Franz Konrad (1997) (United Kingdom) Richard Dean (1997) (Germany) Wido Rössler (1997) (Chile) Eliseo Salazar (1997) (Spain) Jésus Pareja (1997) (Finland) Harri Toivonen (1997) (United Kingdom) Tim Sugden (1998) (South Africa) Grant Orbell (1998) (United Kingdom) William Hewland (1998)
- Debut: 1997 FIA Sportscar Championship Donington
- Last season: 1998
Races	Wins	Poles	F/Laps
4	0	0	0
- Constructors' Championships: 0
- Drivers' Championships: 0

=== Development ===
In 1996, the stored P351 chassis was bought by Keith Wiggins, founder of Pacific Racing. Following Pacific's failed attempts at Formula One and Formula 3000, Wiggins decided to enter the team in sports car racing, planning on the new International Sportscar Racing Series that would debut in 1997.

In order to conform to new sports prototype rules which had been developed since the demise of Group C in 1994, the car was heavily modified from its original form with the help of Pilbeam Racing Designs. First and foremost the car's roof was removed in order to create a true two-seater open cockpit design. This required the installation of a rollbar in order to not only allow for driver safety, but also make up for the loss of chassis rigidity. The car's Weslake V12 was also no longer legal, requiring Pacific to turn to a twin-turbocharged Nissan 3.0L V6 used in IMSA. The unit required the addition of two inlets to the upper bodywork to serve as air intakes for the turbochargers. The car was completed and began testing at Snetterton in the hands of driver William Hewland.

Although the car was not connected with British Racing Motors anymore, the car would retain the BRM name as that is the company considered to have constructed the original chassis. Pacific could have renamed the chassis after its extensive modifications but decided instead to keep the BRM name alive.

=== Racing history ===
The car made its competition debuted at the opening ISRS round at Donington Park, being driven by Franz Konrad, Richard Dean and Wido Rössler. The car successfully qualified in 6th place out of the nine entries, but like the P351 it failed to start the race due to electrical problems. With this setback, the team decided to concentrate solely on the 24 Hours of Le Mans and not participate in any more ISRS races. The driver lineup was completely changed from Donington, now consisting of Eliseo Salazar, Jésus Pareja and former P351 driver Harri Toivonen. The P301 set the 34th fastest time out of 48 entries, although it actually placed 19th on the grid. Unfortunately like BRM's Le Mans race in 1992, the P301 would suffer engine problems and drop out after 6 laps, again the first car out of the race.

After a dismal debut in 1997, the P301 would return in 1998, entering the third ISRS round at Misano with yet another new driver line-up of Tim Sugden and Grant Orbell. The car successfully qualified 9th out of the 24 entries, its best qualifying effort ever. This would however be the most success the car would ever have, as it yet again failed to finish after a mere 4 laps. This would be followed by the next round, returning again to Donington, where the car would fail to even take the green flag, and becoming the final race ever for the P301 chassis. The BRM 301 would thus end its career in the same way as the P351 had begun.

Money for the project would run out, and eventually Pacific Racing itself would close, ending the run of the BRM.
