= ProSport LM3000 =

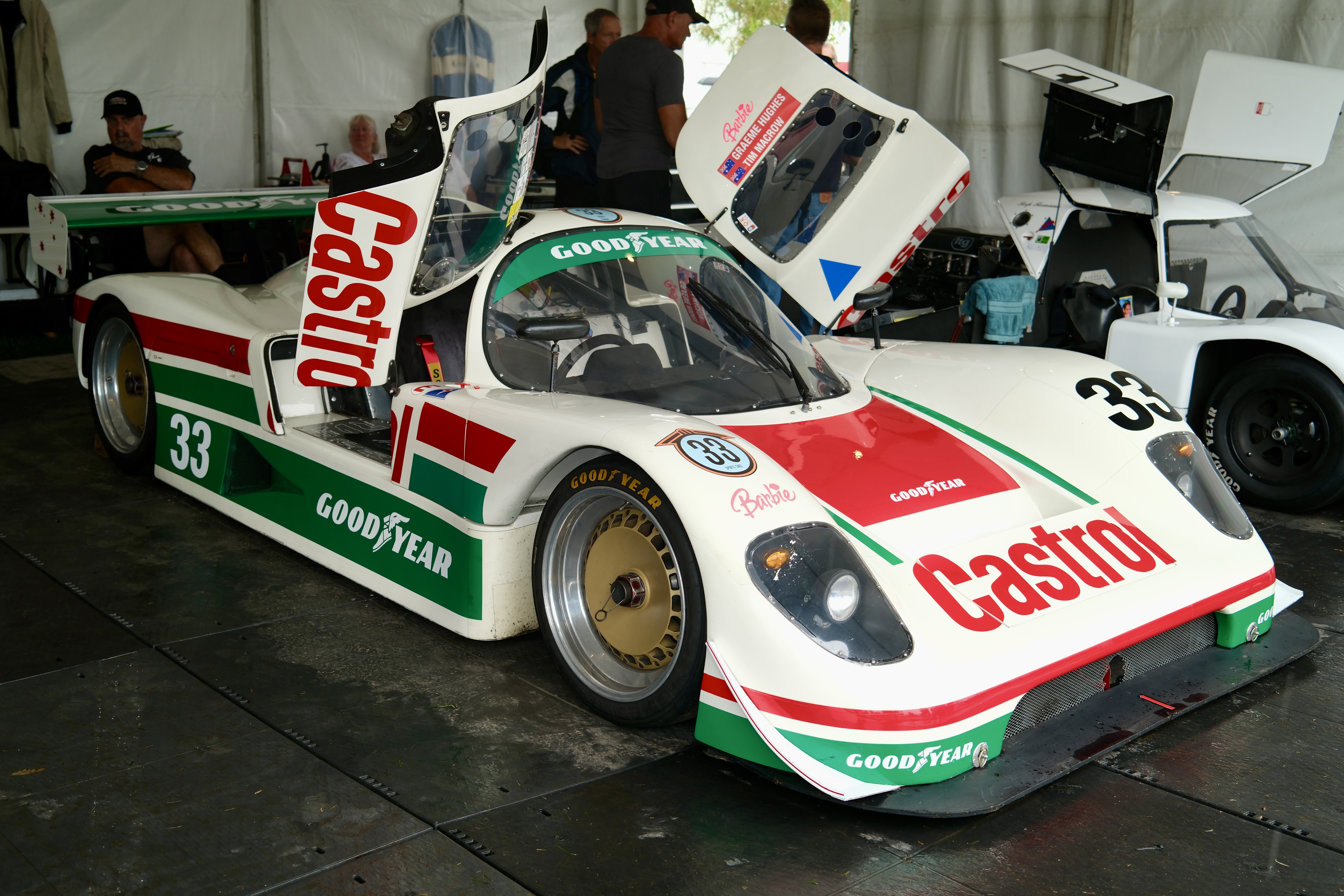
- Category: LM3000 prototype (originally); WSC; GT2/GT3 (British GT Championship only)
- Designer: Arthur Griffin
- Production: 1991-1997

Technical specifications
- Chassis: Aluminium spaceframe
- Suspension: Double wishbones, coil springs over shock absorbers, anti-roll bars
- Engine: Ford-Cosworth FBA 3.0 L (183.1 cu in) 60° V6 DOHC naturally aspirated, mid engined Ferrari 3.5 L (213.6 cu in) 90° V8 DOHC naturally aspirated, mid engined Toyota 1UZ-FE 4.0 L (244.1 cu in) 90° V8 DOHC naturally aspirated, mid engined
- Transmission: Hewland FT200 5-speed manual
- Power: 300–450 hp (220–340 kW)
- Tyres: Dunlop

Competition history
- Notable drivers: Mike Millard; Ian Heward; Steven Brady; Nigel Rata; Ian Stinton
Races	Wins	Podiums	Poles	F/Laps
21	0	2	0	1
- Teams' Championships: 0
- Constructors' Championships: 0
- Drivers' Championships: 0

The ProSport LM3000, also known as the ProSport 3000 Spyder, is a sports prototype race car, first built in 1991. It was later adapted into GT-style racing, and competed in the GT2/Group GT3 classes of the British GT Championship. It also notably entered and competed in the 1997 24 Hours of Daytona, finishing 33rd-place overall, being driven by Kevin Sherwood, Mike Millard, Peter Hardman, and Nigel Greensall.
