= Weslake V12 engine =

Reciprocating internal combustion engine

Overview
- Manufacturer: Weslake (Type 58, WRP-190); All American Racers (Mark-1A); JHS Engines Ltd. (BRM Type 290)
- Production: 1966–1992

Layout
- Configuration: 60° V12
- Displacement: 2,997 cc (182.9 cu in) (Type 58); 2,995 cc (182.8 cu in) (WRP-190, Mark-1A); 3,494 cc (213.2 cu in) (BRM Type 290)
- Cylinder bore: 72.8 mm (2.87 in) (TYPE 58); 75 mm (2.95 in) (WRP-190, Mark-1A); 81 mm (3.19 in) (BRM Type 290)
- Piston stroke: 60 mm (2.36 in) (TYPE 58); 56.5 mm (2.22 in) (WRP-190, Mark-1A); 56.5 mm (2.22 in) (BRM Type 290)
- Valvetrain: Gear-driven DOHC, four-valves per cylinder
- Compression ratio: 11.5:1-12.5:1

Combustion
- Fuel system: Lucas fuel injection
- Fuel type: Gasoline
- Oil system: Dry sump

Output
- Power output: 364–630 hp (271–470 kW)
- Torque output: 243–300 lb⋅ft (329–407 N⋅m)

Dimensions
- Length: 737 mm (29.0 in) (Type 58, Mark-1A); 805 mm (31.7 in) (WRP-190)
- Width: 483 mm (19.0 in) (Type 58, Mark-1A); 485 mm (19.1 in) (WRP-190)
- Height: 546 mm (21.5 in) (Type 58, Mark-1A); 559 mm (22 in) (WRP-190)
- Dry weight: 177 kg (390 lb) (Type 58); 175 kg (386 lb) (WRP-190); 150 kg (331 lb) (Mark-1A)

Weslake V12 engine refers to two families of naturally-aspirated, four-stroke, 60° V12 racing engines, both initially designed by Weslake and produced and developed by Weslake and others between 1966 and 1992. The engines were raced in Formula One (F1) and sports car endurance racing, while various plans for Weslake V12-powered road cars all came to nothing.

== History ==
Weslake was an engineering firm founded by Harry Weslake, and was based in Rye, East Sussex. It became well known for its work on airflow and combustion chamber shape in internal combustion engines. After doing several projects with British Racing Motors (BRM), including work on the 1.5-litre F1 V8 engine which powered BRM and driver Graham Hill to the manufacturers and drivers World Championships respectively in 1962, BRM owner Rubery Owen acquired 20% of the shares of Weslake. BRM sent former chief engineer Peter Berthon and design engineer Frank Aubrey Woods to Weslake, making it BRM's research division for advanced projects. Weslake's role as research centre also resulted in a close cooperation with Shell and the Shell Technology Centre.

F1's governing body, the Fédération Internationale de l'Automobile (FIA), announced a new displacement limit of 3.0-litres for F1 cars with naturally aspirated engines beginning with the 1966 season. Proposals for a new 3.0-litre BRM F1 engine came both from Weslake in Rye, and BRM's base in Bourne, Lincolnshire. Peter Berthon and Harry Weslake proposed a new V12 engine with four valves per cylinder, while BRM's technical director, Tony Rudd, resisted the idea of a multi-valve engine. BRM compromised by committing to a new H16 engine with two valves per cylinder, while allowing Weslake to pursue their V12 design. Single-cylinder test engines for each design were built by Shell and tested at Rye. The test engine for the Weslake design produced 158 bhp (118 kW) per litre, and a subsequent Shell twin cylinder test engine was built. When Weslake's three-year contract with BRM expired, the partnership was dissolved and the V12 was shelved. BRM focused development on the complicated H16, which proved to be too unreliable to be competitive, leading them to later embark on development of a new BRM V12 engine.

== Gurney-Weslake ==
=== Weslake WRP 58 ===
American racing driver Dan Gurney drove for BRM in 1960, and maintained contact with engineer Aubrey Woods, through whom he learned about the outputs obtained from the Shell twin-cylinder test engine, which had produced 160 bhp (120 kW) per litre. Gurney had been following similar work done by Cosworth, so after reconnecting with Aubrey Woods, he took some of his own ideas for improving airflow in the cylinder heads of the Ford Windsor V8s in his race cars to Weslake, who began producing aluminium heads for him based on his input and their own research starting in 1965.

In October 1965, Gurney's company, All American Racers (AAR), commissioned Weslake Engineering to build a series of six V12 F1 engines, numbered 5801 to 5806, based on the Shell research test engines, for his Eagle Mk1. Work on the engine had started in August of that year. The engine was initially named the Weslake WRP 58, and later was generally known as the Gurney-Weslake Type 58. Gurney's F1 cars would be built in a facility close to Weslake's, by a division known as Anglo-American Racers.

The design effort was led by Aubrey Woods, and resulted in a naturally aspirated 3.0-litre DOHC 12-cylinder engine with a 60° angle between cylinder banks. Aubrey Woods' previous work at BRM with their 1.5-litre and 2.0-litre V8 engines was clearly seen in the new Weslake V12. The V12's crankcase was very similar, apart from being extended to seven main bearings to carry the four extra pistons. The case sides reach below the centreline of the steel crankshaft by Laystall, and are ribbed. The titanium connecting rods are actually BRM parts. And like the BRM, the Weslake's pistons run in thin-wall, centrifugally-cast iron wet liners in the block. The compression ratio is 12:1. Bore x stroke are 72.8 mm × 60 mm (2.87 in × 2.36 in), for a total displacement of 2,997 cc (182.9 cu in). The cylinder heads have four valves per cylinder with an included angle of just 30° between intake and exhaust. A one-piece cover spans both of the closely-spaced camshafts on each bank, which are driven by a BRM-style geartrain. Unusually, the engine uses the same cylinder head casting for both the left and right piston banks. It was also discovered that the straight inlet path that was characteristic of the Shell test engines had been lost, with the Weslake having a kink in the intake port. Dimensions and weight for early Type 58 engines are 737 mm (29.0 in) long, 483 mm (19.0 in) wide, and 546 mm (21.5 in) high, and 177 kg (390.2 lb). That makes it longer, considerably narrower, and just under 10 kilograms heavier than the early Cosworth DFVs, whose corresponding measurements are 544 mm (21.4 in) long, 686 mm (27 in), and 167.8 kg (370 lb).

In its debut race at the 1966 Italian Grand Prix, 364 bhp (271 kW) was available. This was raised to 390 bhp (290 kW) during the winter. At the 1967 Race of Champions at Brands Hatch, Gurney's engine gave 413 bhp (308 kW) and Richie Ginther's engine gave 409 bhp (305 kW). On test, up to 422 bhp (315 kW) had been achieved. At Monaco, Gurney had 411 bhp (306 kW), and Ginther 417 bhp (311 kW). Later in the 1967 season quotes of 416 bhp (310 kW) were made. The engines peaked at around 10,000 rpm. A figure of 442 bhp (330 kW) was mentioned at the start of 1968, but after money ran out, a test at the BRM factory recorded only 378 bhp. Weslake's ultimate goal was reported to have been 500 bhp (370 kW) at 12,000 rpm.

The machine tools used by Weslake to produce the engine's major components were Royal Navy surplus, some of which dated back to the first World War. Reliability problems were often caused by failures of ancillaries rather than the engine's main components.

Among the more serious ongoing problems with the engine were overheating, and inadequate oil scavenging.

At one point famous British engineer Beatrice Shilling consulted with Weslake on some of the problems they encountered with the engine.

Gurney won the 1967 Race of Champions, a non-championship event, and the 1967 Belgian Grand Prix with the Eagle-Weslake V12 engine.

==== Applications ====
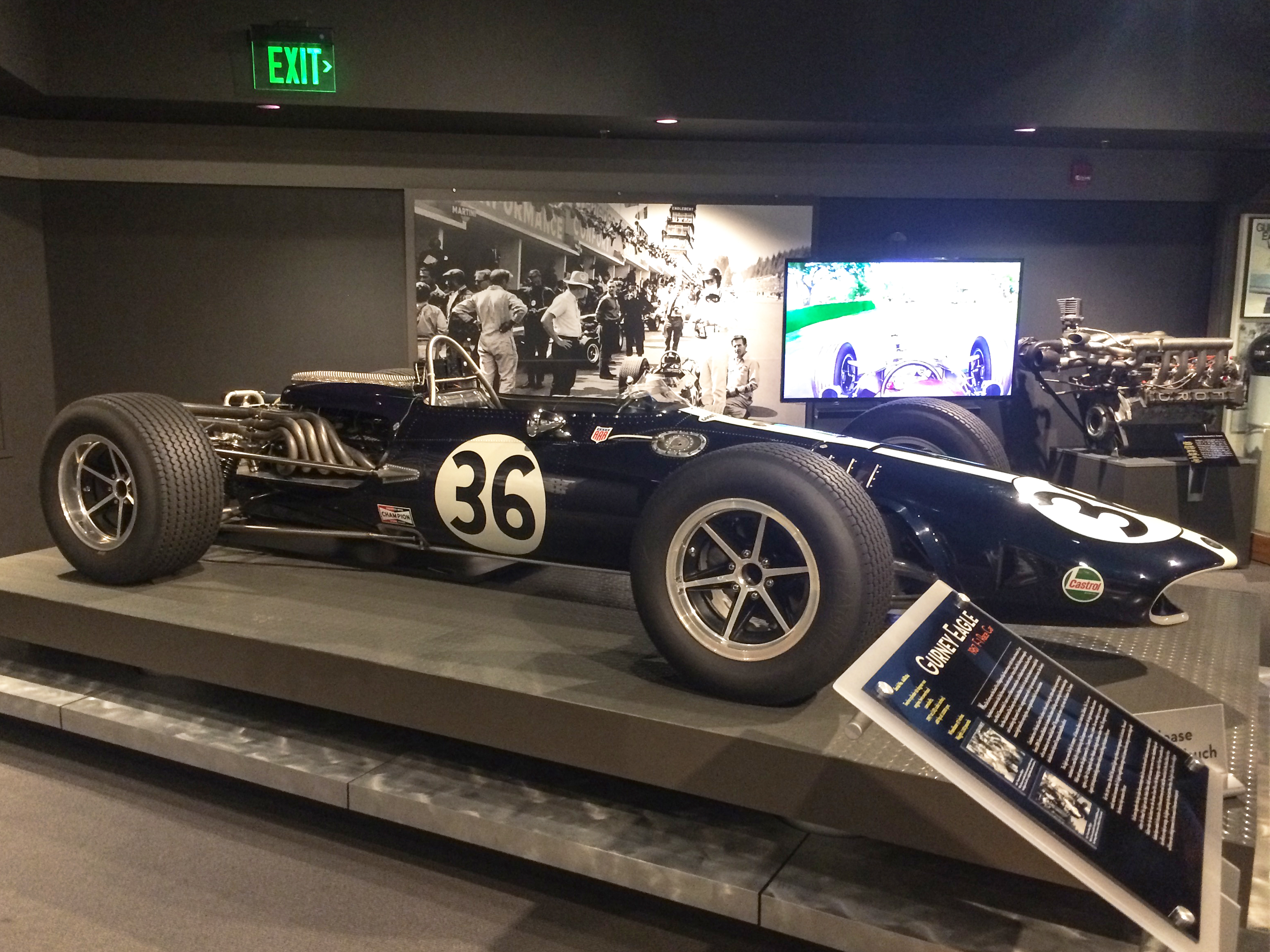
AAR Eagle with Type 58 V12

- Eagle Mk1 (Gurney-Weslake Type 58)

=== Gurney Eagle Mark-1A ===
Gurney and AAR became increasingly concerned about the quality and consistency of the engines Weslake were delivering. In October 1967 they entered into a new contract, renewable on a monthly basis, for Weslake to become a parts supplier only, with AAR taking over responsibility for engine assembly. This arrangement only lasted a few months before AAR, having suffered a series of engine failures at the South African Grand Prix in January 1968, decided to bring production of the engine entirely in-house. The company began to build and staff their own engine assembly group. They hired Doug Orchard from Vanwall as chief engine fitter, and former Cosworth employee Robert Richards to assist Orchard. Bill Dunne leased a building in Ashford, Kent, 24 km (15 mi) northeast of Rye, to serve as the new division's premises, and began looking for companies able to produce cast and machined parts to AAR's specifications. Aubrey Woods left Weslake to become AAR's chief engineer, and Peter French, previously of Coventry-Climax, joined as head of research and development. Work continued on the engine at Weslake under this new arrangement. Changes were made to the combustion chamber shape, along with an increase in intake valve diameter, and a reduction in exhaust valve size.

AAR's engine group took up residence in their new facility in May of 1968. Without a dynamometer of their own, they took Tony Rudd of BRM up on an offer of their dyno. When the results were in, the Weslake V12 only developed 385–390 bhp (287–291 kW), 42 bhp (31 kW) less than the lowest ever reported by Weslake.

AAR undertook changes to reduce the weight of the engine. Some parts were recast in magnesium. A plan to produce the crankcase in magnesium-zirconium does not appear to have happened. The result of these weight reduction efforts was an engine that weighed 150 kg (331 lb). The cause of the engine's crankcase pressurisation and poor oil scavenging was traced to effects of thermal expansion of the engine block and the use of only two piston rings, allowing excess oil to pass the rings, and adding stress to the connection rods that led to their failure. New deep-skirted pistons were designed, using three piston rings, along with new, shorter, connecting rods of titanium and a new crankshaft.

The text on the engine's cam covers was changed from "Gurney-Weslake" to "Eagle Mark-1A".

An Eagle with the new Mark-1A first appeared at Monaco in 1968. Problems with the engine continued, and the last race that a Gurney-Weslake appeared in was the 1968 Italian Grand Prix.

==== Applications ====
- Eagle Mk1 (Gurney Eagle Mark-1A)

=== Complete Formula One World Championship results ===
(key) (results in bold indicate pole position; results in italics indicate fastest lap)

Year	Entrants	Chassis	Engine	Tyres	Drivers	1	2	3	4	5	6	7	8	9	10	11	12	Points	WCC
1966	Anglo American Racers	Eagle Mk1	Weslake Type 58 V12	G		MON	BEL	FRA	GBR	NED	GER	ITA	USA	MEX				0	13th
1966	Anglo American Racers	Eagle Mk1	Weslake Type 58 V12	G	(United States) Dan Gurney							Ret	Ret					0	13th
1966	Anglo American Racers	Eagle Mk1	Weslake Type 58 V12	G	(United States) Bob Bondurant									Ret				0	13th
1967	Anglo American Racers	Eagle Mk1	Weslake Type 58 V12	G		RSA	MON	NED	BEL	FRA	GBR	GER	CAN	ITA	USA	MEX		13	7th
1967	Anglo American Racers	Eagle Mk1	Weslake Type 58 V12	G	(United States) Dan Gurney		Ret	Ret	1	Ret	Ret	Ret	3	Ret	Ret	Ret		13	7th
1967	Anglo American Racers	Eagle Mk1	Weslake Type 58 V12	G	(United States) Richie Ginther		DNQ											13	7th
1967	Anglo American Racers	Eagle Mk1	Weslake Type 58 V12	G	(United States) Bruce McLaren					Ret	Ret	Ret						13	7th
1967	Anglo American Racers	Eagle Mk1	Weslake Type 58 V12	G	(Italy) Ludovico Scarfiotti									Ret				13	7th
1968	Anglo American Racers	Eagle Mk1	Weslake Type 58 V12	G		RSA	ESP	MON	BEL	NED	FRA	GBR	GER	ITA	CAN	USA	MEX	0	NC
1968	Anglo American Racers	Eagle Mk1	Weslake Type 58 V12	G	(United States) Dan Gurney	Ret												0	NC
1968	Anglo American Racers	Eagle Mk1	Eagle Mark-1A V12	G	(United States) Dan Gurney			Ret				Ret	9	Ret				0	NC

=== Complete Non-Championship results ===
(key) (results in bold indicate pole position; results in italics indicate fastest lap)

Year	Entrants	Chassis	Engine	Tyres	Drivers	1	2	3	4	5	6
1967	Anglo American Racers	Eagle Mk1	Weslake Type 58 V12	**G**		ROC	SPC	INT	SYR	OUL	ESP
1967	Anglo American Racers	Eagle Mk1	Weslake Type 58 V12	**G**	(United States) Dan Gurney	**1**					
1967	Anglo American Racers	Eagle Mk1	Weslake Type 58 V12	**G**	(United States) Richie Ginther	10					

== Ford-Weslake ==
=== Weslake WRP-190 ===
After the 1970 British Grand Prix, Harry Weslake, Ford director of motorsport Stuart Turner, and GT40 designer Len Bailey discussed Ford's need for a sports car engine to do for Ford in endurance racing what the Cosworth DFV had done for them in F1. In 1970, Walter Hayes visited Weslake's works on behalf of Ford, and pledged £30,000 towards development of a new V12 engine to be used in the John Wyer Automotive Engineering (JWAE) Gulf endurance racers.

At Weslake, Harry's son-in-law Michael Daniel headed the design effort, which resulted in a 3.0-litre 60° V12 with double overhead camshafts, four valves per cylinder and, in a departure from the earlier Type 58, dry cylinder liners. Weslake called it the WRP-190, while it was generally known as the Ford-Weslake V12.

The liners are installed in an aluminium block with a cast magnesium sump contributing to its stiffness. The cylinder dimensions of this engine made it even more oversquare than Weslake's previous V12. Bore x stroke are 75 mm × 56.5 mm (3.0 in × 2.2 in), while the total displacement is 2,995 cc (182.8 cu in), differing only minutely from that of the Type 58. Each aluminium cylinder head held two camshafts which were driven by a gear train on the front of the engine. Each pent-roof combustion chamber held four valves, with an included angle of 22° between intake and exhaust. The compression ratio is 12:1.

Engine dimensions are 805 mm (31.7 in) long, 485 mm (19.1 in) wide and 559 mm (22 in) high and weight was 175 kg (386 lb), including the integral clutch housing and with the flywheel and starter mounted.

Development sponsor Ford pulled out of the project when Gulf rejected the engine after a series of tests with the Ford-Weslake in a Mirage M6 at Goodwood and Silverstone, which led Weslake to sue JWAE. The Brabham F1 team also evaluated and rejected the engine. Weslake then offered to sell the design rights to Ford, who declined. Weslake was eventually able to sell the rights to the engine.

==== Applications ====
- Mirage M6 Chassis #603 barquette and coupé (Weslake WRP-190)
- Brabham BT39 (Weslake WRP-190)

=== Lynx Engineering ===
While one reference reports that the WRP-190 was first acquired by Aston Martin Lagonda, others report that Lynx Engineering first bought the rights to the engine from Weslake for £10,000. Lynx, which specialised in customised Jaguars, was owned by Guy Black, a former Weslake engineer. They planned to field a car powered by the V12 at the 24 Hours of Le Mans, but were unable to secure adequate sponsorship. Lynx sold the engine after installing the only Lynx-built V12 in a Jaguar D-Type replica.

=== Aston Martin Lagonda Project DP1080 ===
Rights to Weslake's V12 were also briefly owned by Aston Martin Lagonda, who envisioned it as the basis of a road car engine. Aston started Project DP1080 to develop the engine for their purposes, but when they were unable to reach either their horsepower target or their 4.0-litre displacement goal, they sold the design.

=== BRM Type 290 ===
Rights to the engine were finally acquired by JHS Engines Ltd., whose three principals were former Cosworth employees Graham Dale-Jones and Terry Hoyle, along with Robert Sutherland, a Colorado businessman who operated a chain of lumber yards and was a vintage car collector and amateur racing driver.

JHS undertook an extensive redesign of the engine that included eliminating the dry liners and running the pistons in Nikasil-coated cylinder bores, which allowed the bore to be increased to 81 mm (3.19 in) and displacement to 3,494 cc. Changes were made to the engine's valves, camshaft drives, and location of various pumps. Ricardo Engineering assisted JHS with development. John Mangoletsi agreed to build a Group C car for the engine. Mangoletsi also convinced Rubery Owen to sponsor the effort, and to revive the BRM name for the engine as the BRM Type 290, even though it was unrelated to BRM's own earlier V12 engine. The car was similarly named the BRM P351. Five engines were built, each reportedly able to produce 625 bhp (466 kW) at 11,500 rpm. The P351 raced at Silverstone and Le Mans in 1992, but did poorly. The last appearance of the Type 290 on a track was in an Arrows chassis in the 1998 and 1999 BOSS GP series.

In addition to the BRM P351 race car, work began on a road car called the BRM P401 to be powered by an enlarged V12 with forced induction. Power was to come from a 4.0-litre version of the Type 290 with two superchargers. This project progressed to the clay model stage.

==== Applications ====
- BRM P351 (BRM Type 290)
