= Claude Michy =

French sports executive

Claude Michy, born 3 April 1949 in Clermont-Ferrand (Puy-de-Dôme), is the President of the Clermontois football club Clermont Foot Auvergne 63, since 2005. He is also the creator and president of PHA Claude Michy Manager since 1994, and organises numerous sporting events, including motor races such as the French motorcycle Grand Prix.

== Football ==
He has been the president of Clermont Foot Auvergne 63 since June 2005. Since his return to the club, he has also benefitted from the help of his friend Francis Graille, former President of LOSC and Paris-Saint-Germain.

When he arrived, the club had been relegated to the National, but was returned to Ligue 2 due to the financial failure of ASOA Valence. Claude Michy appointed Dominique Bijotat to take over the first team, but after only a few days, he moved on to FC Sochaux. Marc Collat was named as his replacement as coach for the 2005/2006 season, but the club was relegated again to the National.

Didier Ollé-Nicolle was appointed by Claude Michy to rescue the club, and did well. The relationship between Claude Michy and Didier Ollé-Nicolle meant that the club were National champions in 2007, and beat all records, leading to their best season in Ligue 2 in the 2007/2008 season (5th place). After the departure of Didier Ollé-Nicolle to l'OGC Nice, Claude Michy appointed his third manager in Michel Der Zakarian.

Under his presidency, Claude Michy regularly organised dinner-debates for teachers and club partners, led by television presenter Hervé Mathoux. Gérard Houllier, Guy Roux and Raymond Domenech were among the first guests.

== Motor sport ==
He has a passion for motor sport. He was a driver from the age of 20 in rally, circuit and hill climbing, and finished 4th in the France Formula Renault Championship in 1973. Therefore, he quickly became an organiser of motor sports events, and in 1976, organised the first racing team from Clermont-Ferrand with Patrick Depailler, former Formula 1 driver. He dealt with public relations for stunt driver Alain Prieur from 1978 to 1984, and was manager of Formula 1 driver Patrick Tambay, for the 1981/1982 season at Ferrari. He took part in the organisation of the Paris-Dakar for TSO (Thierry Sabine Organisation) from 1982 to 1992. He helped organise the prologue of Paris Dakar from Clermont in 1991 and 2004. In 1994, he founded the PHA society. Since 1994, he has been the promoter-organiser of the French motorcycle Grand Prix. He is co-organiser of 6 runnings of the Andros Trophy at the Stade de France between 1998 and 2004. He still organises the stage of the Andros Trophy at Super-Besse. In 2002, he organised the Motocross World Championship to Saint-Jean d'Angély and the Motocross World Championship in 2005. He co-organised the Mondial du deux roues de Paris with Thierry Hesse in 2009.

== Other sports ==
Claude Michy organised his first major competition in Clermont-Ferrand in 1992 with the European Boxing Championships. He repeated the experience by organising the World Boxing Championships Salim Medjkoune/Mahyar Monshipour in Clermont-Ferrand in 2003 and 2004.

He is also General Manager of the European Ice Skating Championships in Lyon and organiser of the festivities of the inauguration of Vulcania in 2006.

== Sources ==
- Official site of Clermont Foot Auvergne 63
- Official site of the French motorcycle Grand Prix
