= Nissan R390 GT1 =

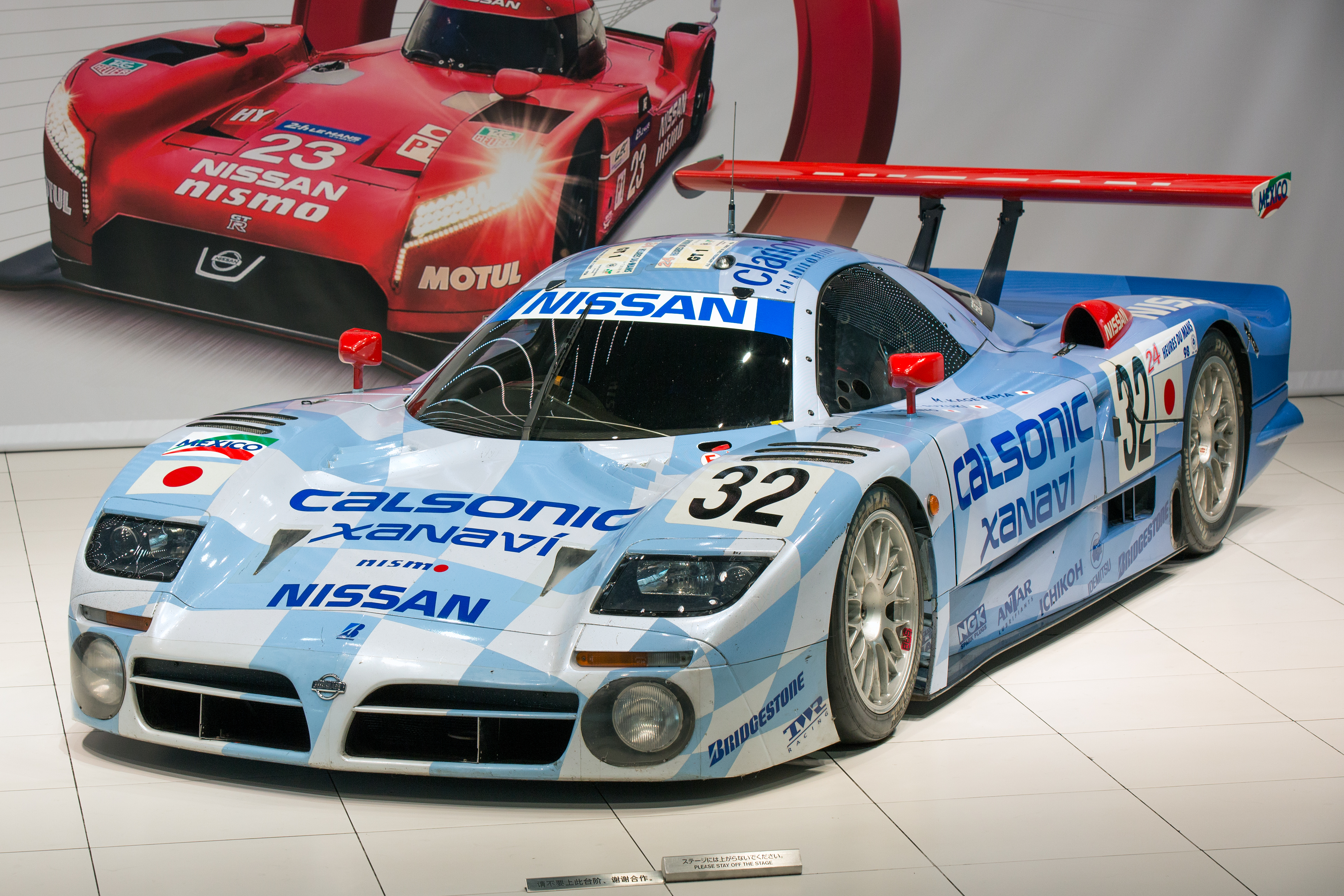
- Category: LMGT1
- Constructor: Nissan Motorsports Ltd.
- Designers: Tony Southgate; Ian Callum; Yutaka Hagiwara
- Predecessor: Nissan R383
- Successor: Nissan R391

Technical specifications
- Chassis: Carbon fibre monocoque chassis
- Suspension (front): Double wishbone pushrod system
- Suspension (rear): Double wishbone pushrod system
- Length: 4,580 mm (180.3 in)
- Width: 2,000 mm (78.7 in)
- Height: 1,090 mm (42.9 in)
- Wheelbase: 2,720 mm (107.1 in)
- Engine: Nissan VRH35L 3,495 cc (213.3 cu in) 90° V8 twin-turbocharged rear mid-engine, rear-wheel-drive, longitudinally mounted
- Transmission: Xtrac 6-speed sequential manual
- Weight: 1,098 kilograms (2,421 lb)
- Tyres: Bridgestone

Competition history
- Notable entrants: Nismo; Tom Walkinshaw Racing
- Notable drivers: (Japan) Kazuyoshi Hoshino (Japan) Masahiko Kageyama (Japan) Aguri Suzuki (Japan) Satoshi Motoyama (Japan) Takuya Kurosawa (Japan) Masami Kageyama (United Kingdom) Martin Brundle (Germany) Michael Krumm (Germany) Jörg Müller (Netherlands) Jan Lammers (South Africa) Wayne Taylor (Belgium) Eric van de Poele (Italy) Riccardo Patrese (Italy) Andrea Montermini (France) Érik Comas (France) Franck Lagorce (Denmark) John Nielsen
- Debut: 1997 24 Hours of Le Mans
Races	Wins	Poles	F/Laps
2	0	0	0

The Nissan R390 GT1 was a racing car built in Atsugi, Japan. It was designed primarily to gain a suitable racing entry in the 24 Hours of Le Mans in 1997 and 1998. It was built to race under the grand touring style rules, requiring a homologated road version to be built. Therefore, the R390 was built originally as road car, then a racing version of the car was developed afterwards. Only one R390 road car was ever built and is stored at Nissan's Zama facility, although one of the race cars was later modified for road use. The road car was claimed to be capable of attaining a top speed of 354 km/h (220 mph). However, this claim has never been proven.

== History ==
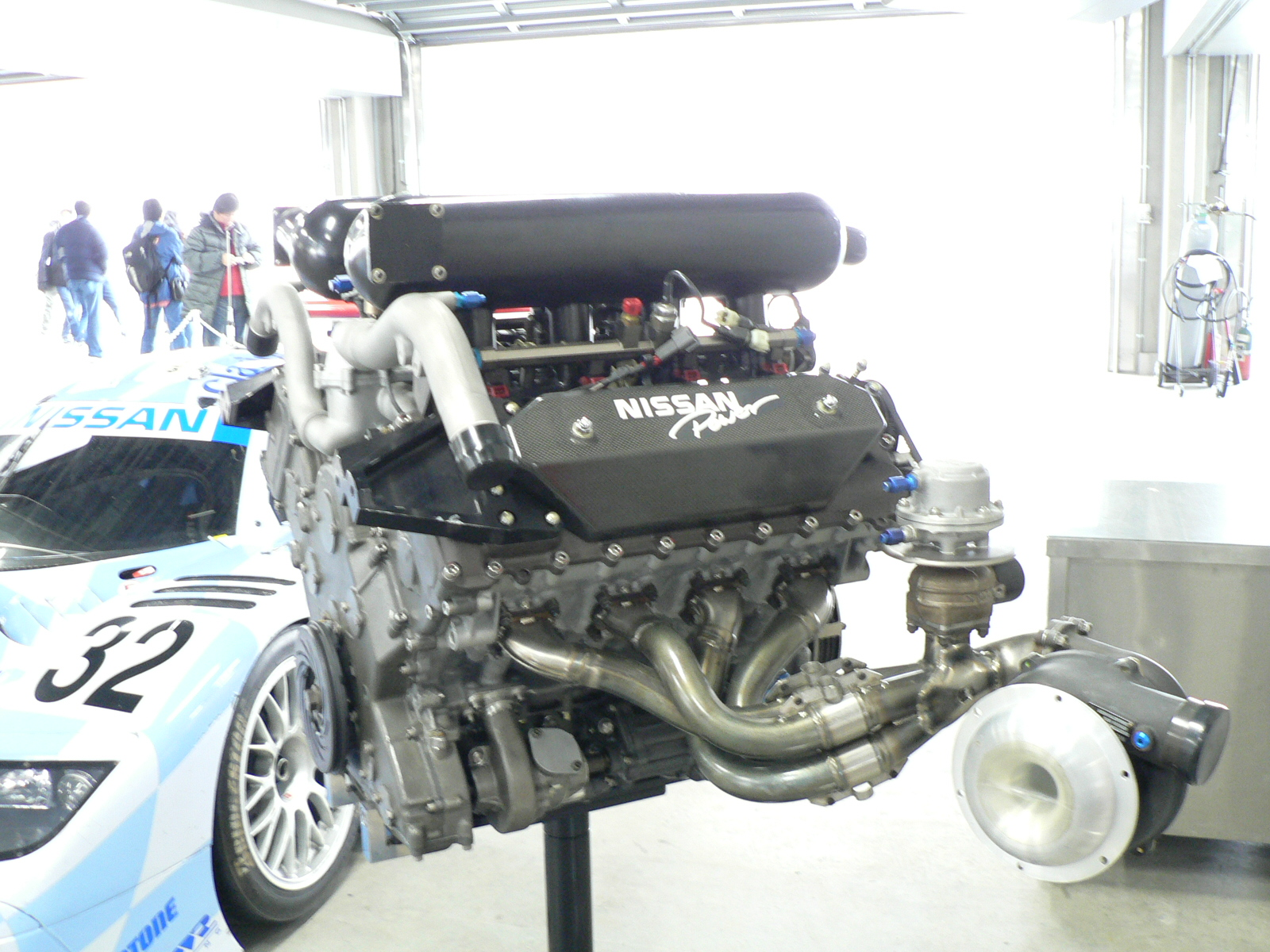
The VRH35L twin-turbocharged V8 engine used in the R390 GT1

After returning to sports car racing in 1995, Nismo (Nissan motorsport) had some measure of success with their Skyline GT-R LM which had competed in the GT1 class. However, these cars were quickly outpaced by the influx of new manufacturers who were using loopholes in the GT regulations to build racing cars that bore little resemblance to their GT1 class competitors, examples being the Mercedes-Benz CLK GTR and the Porsche 911 GT1. Nismo's Skyline GT-R therefore needed to be replaced with a purpose built racing car.

Turning to Tom Walkinshaw Racing (TWR), Nismo began developing a prototype of the R390 GT1, named to follow in the tradition started in the 1960s with Nissan's R380. The first decision for Nismo and TWR was the choice of engine. The previous Skyline GT-R LM had used the trusted RB26DETT Inline-six engine, but the design was old for a racing car, employing an iron block which added weight and had a high center of gravity. Nismo instead chose to resurrect an engine from the Nissan R89C, a racing car from the Group C era. Its powerplant, the VRH35Z, was a 3.5 L (3,495 cc) V8 engine which used an aluminium block, as well as having a lower center of gravity and a better ability to be used as a stressed member over the RB26. Thus the engine was modified and designated VRH35L and would produce approximately 650 PS (478 kW; 641 hp) at 7,000 rpm. For the road going version, the engine was detuned to 558 PS (410 kW; 550 hp).

The car's styling group was led by Ian Callum of TWR. The mechanical and aerodynamic design was led both by Tony Southgate, also of TWR, and Yutaka Hagiwara of Nismo. Southgate was the designer of the Jaguar XJR-9 amongst other TWR sports cars, which had won at Le Mans. Due to this, the R390 GT1 bears a resemblance to the Jaguar XJR-15, which was also developed by TWR and based on the XJR-9, and in fact used a cockpit - including the tub, greenhouse and roof line - from the very same tooling as the XJR-15, with some custom tooling blocks added to the XJR15 chassis mold, although for the R390, the rear and front ends, and suspension were completely different and were designed to meet GT1 specifications, the R390's chassis was lower and wider, but slightly shorter in length than the Jaguar, making the R390 larger overall. Development of the car was achieved in a small amount of time, especially due to the use of an existing engine. Nismo and TWR also had to build a road legal version of the R390 GT1 in order to meet homologation requirements. A red R390 prototype underwent wind tunnel testing and aerodynamic improvements in England, however, the final car was built and tested in Atsugi, Japan. Only one road legal R390 was built, which is currently in storage at Nissan's Zama, Kanagawa facility.

After all three cars failed scrutineering at the 1997 event, they had to be modified in order to be allowed to race. This subsequently led to overheating problems for the gearbox, and ultimately led to their failure during the race. That is why for 1998, the R390 was modified, most notably in the extension of its rear bodywork to create increased "luggage space" in order to satisfy the ACO, a new rear wing for racing models (the road legal version had no wing), and a rear diffuser for improved downforce were added.

== Racing results ==
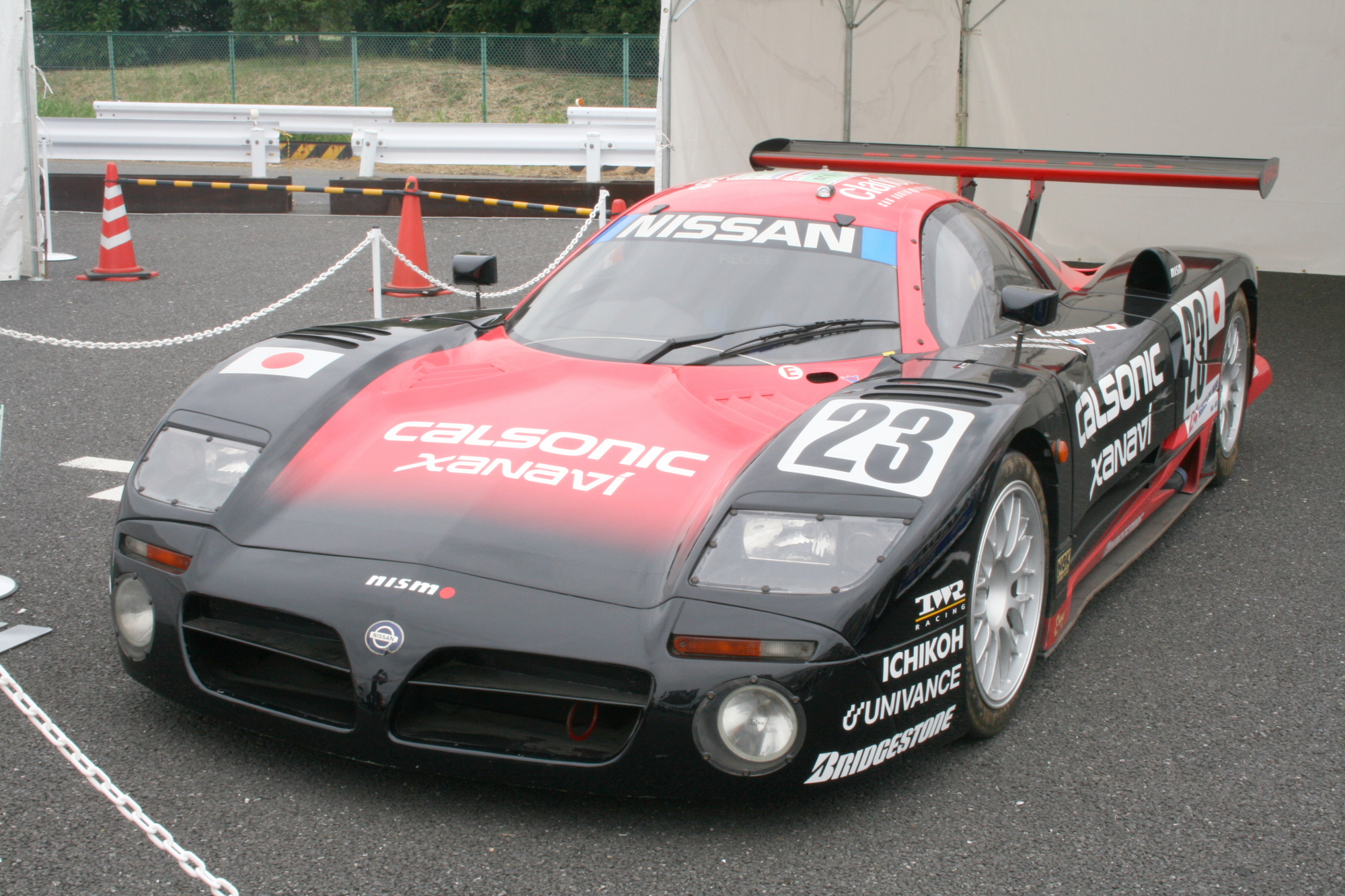
The #23 1997 R390 GT1, the only one to finish at Le Mans '97.

Completed in time for the 1997 24 Hours of Le Mans, the three cars were painted in a black and red livery. In their first outing, pre-qualifying in May, Martin Brundle achieved the fastest time of the field with 3.43.15. At the race itself, the best R390 GT1 (#22) was able to qualify in 4th on the grid and 2nd in its class behind a Porsche 911 GT1, while the other two cars qualified 12th (#21) and 21st (#23). During the race the cars were competitive, but soon began to struggle with gearbox problems and, around halfway through the race, two of the three cars (#21 & #22) finally succumbed to mechanical failure and were withdrawn. The third R390 survived the rest of the race (albeit with two complete gearbox changes along the way) finishing 12th overall and 5th in class, although many laps down from the race winners.

For the 1998 Le Mans 24h, Nissan returned, this time with four R390s. The cars were upgraded, with more downforce generated by a longer rear tail and a new rear diffuser. The racing versions received a new rear wing placement for less drag. Although Nissan was easily beaten in qualifying by Mercedes-Benz CLK-LM, Toyota GT-One, Porsche 911 GT1-98 and BMW V12 LM for places 10, 13, 14, and 19, Nissan was able to achieve considerable success in the race after the retirement of all Mercedes' and BMWs early in the race. All four R390 were able to finish in the Top 10: at 3rd, 5th, 6th, and 10th overall, being beaten only by two Porsche 911 GT1.

Following the 1998 24 Hours of Le Mans, rules for the GT classes were changed, mostly to end the number of manufacturers attempting to use loopholes. Instead of LMGT1, an LMGTP prototype class for closed cockpit cars was introduced for the 1999 Le Mans 24h that allowed more race specific construction without any road-going considerations. With Mercedes and Toyota going to improve their already faster GTs, Nissan was forced to either modify the R390 to a prototype GT, or abandon it like Porsche did with the GT1. Nissan instead turned to the open cockpit LMP classes, developing the R391 prototype for 1999 with European collaboration. After mixed results, that included a win over Toyota in Fuji, this program would also be short lived. Nissan discontinued Le Mans style racing at the end of 1999.

A total of eight R390 GT1 race chassis were built over the two years of the program.

== Road car ==
Nissan R390 GT1
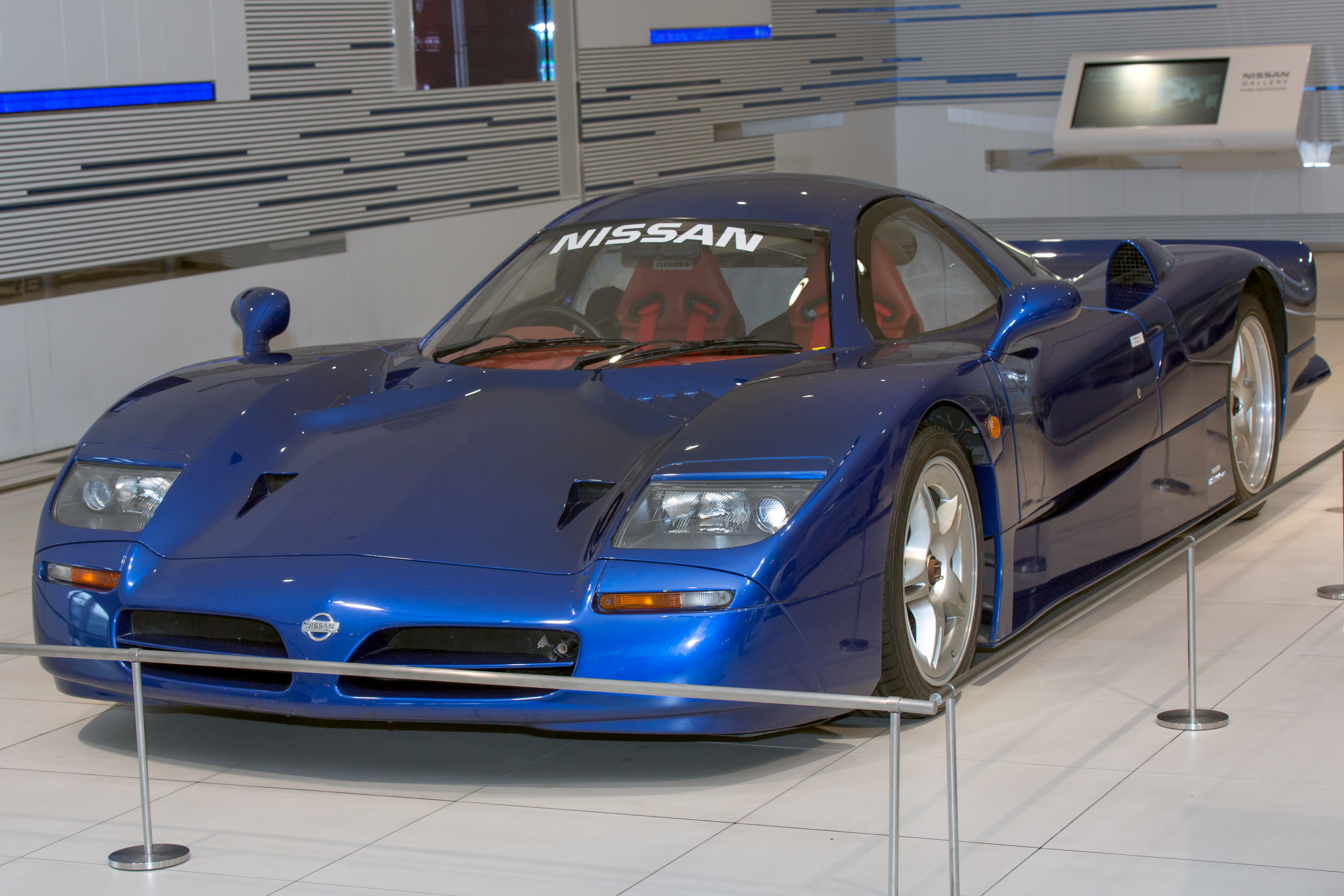
- The Nissan R390 GT1 road car on display at the Nissan Global Headquarters

Overview
- Manufacturer: Nissan
- Production: 1997
- Assembly: Atsugi, Japan

Body and chassis
- Class: Sports car (S)
- Body style: 2-door coupé
- Layout: Rear mid-engine, rear-wheel-drive

Powertrain
- Engine: VRH35L (V8, DOHC), 3,495cc
- Power output: 558 PS (410 kW; 550 hp); 637 N⋅m (470 lbf⋅ft) of torque
- Transmission: 6-speed sequential manual

Dimensions
- Wheelbase: 2,720 mm (107.1 in)
- Length: 4,580 mm (180.3 in)
- Width: 2,000 mm (78.7 in)
- Height: 1,090 mm (42.9 in)
- Curb weight: 1,440 kg (3,175 lb)

Chronology
- Predecessor: Nissan R383
- Successor: Nissan R391

Only one R390 road car was ever produced by Nissan as a prototype for the development of the race-cars and was never intended for sale, although Nissan did offer to build further versions at a value of US$1 million. The lone R390 GT1 is currently stored at Nissan Heritage Collection, along with the #32 R390 GT1 race car from 1998.

The vehicle is powered by the same 3.5 L (3,495 cc) twin-turbocharged VRH35L V8 engine as the race car, generating a power output of 558 PS (410 kW; 550 hp) at 6,800 rpm and 470 lb⋅ft (637 N⋅m) of torque at 4,400 rpm (although Nissan claimed lower figures of "over 350 PS (257 kW; 345 hp)" at 5,200rpm and "over 490 N⋅m (361 lbf⋅ft)" of torque at 4,000 rpm). All of this power is sent to the rear wheels via a six-speed sequential manual transmission. The car is able to accelerate from 0–97 km/h (0–60 mph) in 3.9 seconds and complete the quarter-mile in 11.9 seconds. The top speed is rated at 354 km/h (220 mph) by the manufacturer; however, none of the road tests featuring this car have been carried out for the purpose of top speed.

Initially built in 1997 with a red paint scheme and given the UK registration number "P835 GUD", the car was displayed at the 1997 24 Hours of Le Mans race. It was rebuilt in 1998 with a new front end and side vents, longer tail and a ducktail spoiler instead of a wing, and repainted blue. This car was given the fake registration number "R390 NIS" for photos and magazine articles (not a genuine UK number) and became known as the long tail version. These modifications were also incorporated on the race cars albeit with the addition of a fixed rear wing instead of a ducktail spoiler.

A second R390 GT1 was later registered for road use by Érik Comas. Unlike the original R390 GT1 road car, this example was modified from chassis VIN780009 after Comas purchased it from Nissan. The modification was done by Andrea Chiavenuto, who led a two year long restoration and street conversion project on the car. The car was claimed to retain 95% of its original racing car parts, but several parts such as door panels, glass windshield, cooling system and upholstery had to be installed in order to meet road regulations.

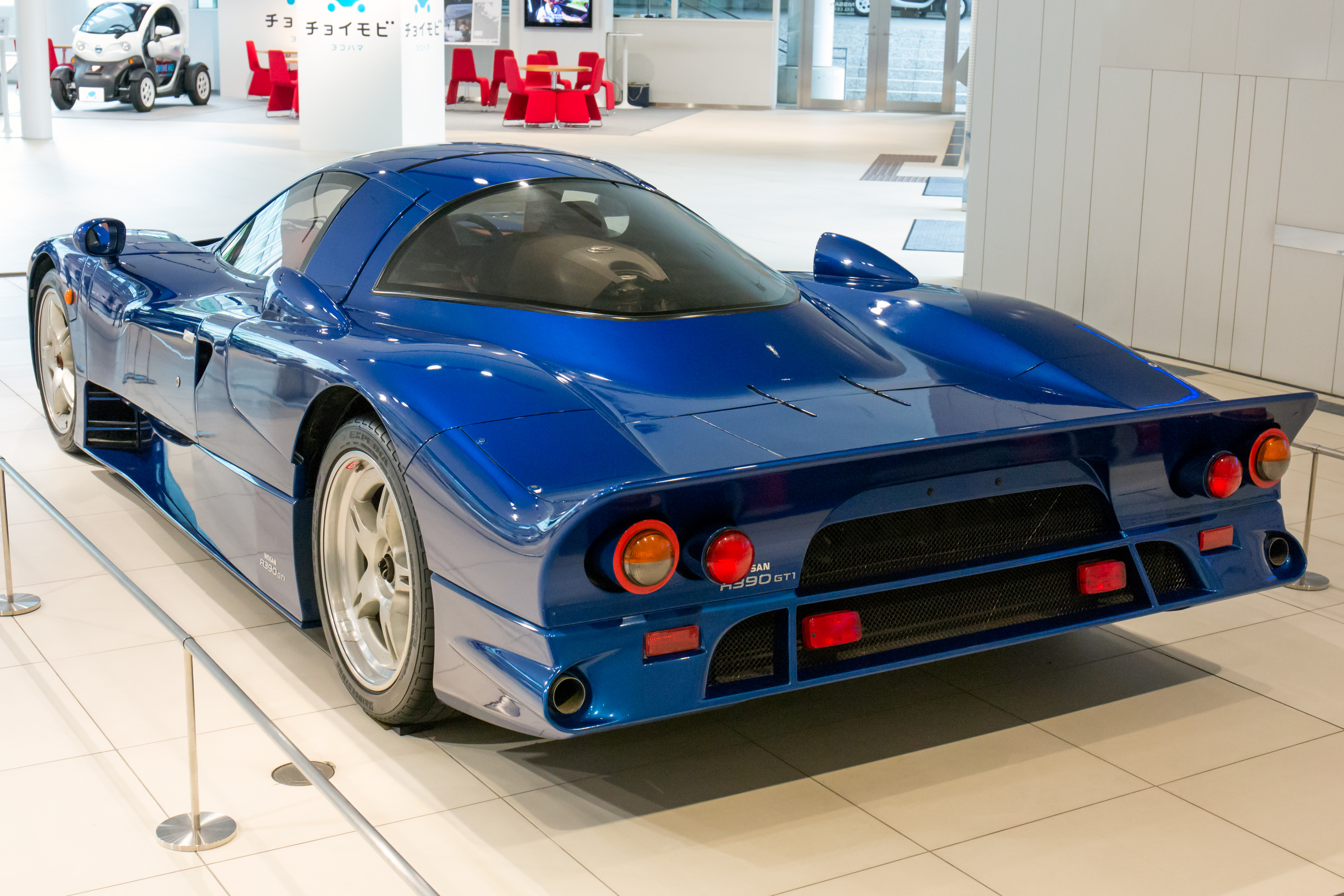
A quarter rear view of the R390 GT1 Road car.

== Appearances ==
Both R390 GT1 race and road cars were featured as a playable vehicle in multiple video games such as Gran Turismo, Forza, Enthusia Professional Racing, GRID, The Crew 2, Project Gotham Racing, Real Racing 3, and Asphalt Legends.
