= 1999 Le Mans Fuji 1000 km =

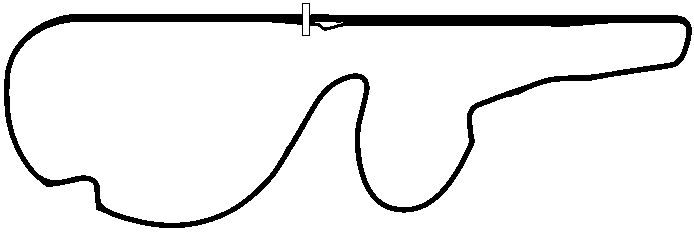
Layout of the Fuji Speedway (1987–2003)

The 1999 Le Mans Fuji 1000 km was an endurance race held on November 7, 1999 at the Fuji Speedway. It was organized by the Automobile Club de l'Ouest (ACO), who ran the 24 Hours of Le Mans, and the Japan Automobile Federation (JAF), who ran the JGTC race series.

== Pre-race ==
Since the mid-1990s, a large number of Japanese automobile manufacturers had begun to compete at the 24 Hours of Le Mans, including Honda, Toyota, and Nissan. Japanese constructors and engine builders were also competing as well, such as Dome, Tom's, and Mugen Motorsports. The ACO therefore was interested in the idea of creating a new sportscar series in Japan similar to the one that had recently been created in the United States, the American Le Mans Series. Thus, the Fuji 1000 km would serve as a one-off experiment to see how well a series would perform in Japan in the future, similar to the one-off 1998 Petit Le Mans for the ALMS.

With an agreement between the ACO and JAF, the race was agreed to take place at Fuji Speedway, and to combine the ACO's LMP, LMGTP, GTS, and GT class with the JAF's JGTC series GT500 and GT300 classes. The addition of JGTC machinery was done not only to entice Japanese teams into possibly moving into the ACO's sportscars, but also to help fill the field and to bring a crowd. However, the race did not count as part of the JGTC season, thus a full JGTC field was not expected since the race was optional. For the ACO classes, an incentive to bring competitors not only from Japan but also internationally was added in that, like Petit Le Mans, the winners in each class would earn automatic entry to the 2000 24 Hours of Le Mans.

== Official results ==
Class winners in bold. Cars failing to complete 70% of winner's distance marked as Not Classified (NC).

Pos	Class	No	Team	Drivers	Chassis	Tyres	Laps	Time/Retired
Pos	Class	No	Team	Drivers	Engine	Tyres	Laps	Time/Retired
1	**LMP**	**23**	**(Japan) Nissan Motorsports**	**(France) Érik Comas (Japan) Satoshi Motoyama (Japan) Masami Kageyama**	**Nissan R391**	B	**228**	**5:32:56.125**
1	**LMP**	**23**	**(Japan) Nissan Motorsports**	**(France) Érik Comas (Japan) Satoshi Motoyama (Japan) Masami Kageyama**	**Nissan VRH50A 5.0 L V8**	B	**228**	**5:32:56.125**
2	**LMGTP**	**1**	**(Japan) Toyota Motorsport (Germany) Toyota Team Europe**	**(Japan) Ukyo Katayama (Japan) Toshio Suzuki (Japan) Keiichi Tsuchiya**	**Toyota TS020**	M	**227**	**+ 1 Lap**
2	**LMGTP**	**1**	**(Japan) Toyota Motorsport (Germany) Toyota Team Europe**	**(Japan) Ukyo Katayama (Japan) Toshio Suzuki (Japan) Keiichi Tsuchiya**	**Toyota R36V 3.6 L Turbo V8**	M	**227**	**+ 1 Lap**
3	LMP	61	(Japan) Team Goh (Japan) Dome Co. Ltd.	(Japan) Hiroki Katoh (Japan) Juichi Wakisaka	Dome-BMW V12 LM	M	222	+ 6 Laps
3	LMP	61	(Japan) Team Goh (Japan) Dome Co. Ltd.	(Japan) Hiroki Katoh (Japan) Juichi Wakisaka	BMW S70 6.0 L V12	M	222	+ 6 Laps
4	**GT500**	**35**	**(Japan) Matsumoto-Kiyoshi Team Tom's**	**(France) Pierre-Henri Raphanel (Japan) Shinichi Yamaji (Japan) Takeshi Tsuchiya**	**Toyota Supra**	M	**211**	**+ 17 Laps**
4	**GT500**	**35**	**(Japan) Matsumoto-Kiyoshi Team Tom's**	**(France) Pierre-Henri Raphanel (Japan) Shinichi Yamaji (Japan) Takeshi Tsuchiya**	**Toyota 3S-GTE 2.1 L Turbo I4**	M	**211**	**+ 17 Laps**
5	GT500	6	(Japan) Team Le Mans	(Japan) Hideki Noda (Australia) Wayne Gardner	Toyota Supra	B	209	+ 19 Laps
5	GT500	6	(Japan) Team Le Mans	(Japan) Hideki Noda (Australia) Wayne Gardner	Toyota 3S-GTE 2.1 L Turbo I4	B	209	+ 19 Laps
6	GT500	32	(Japan) cdmaOne Toyota Team Cerumo	(Japan) Takayuki Kinoshita (Japan) Masahiko Kondo (Japan) Hironori Takeuchi	Toyota Supra	B	208	+ 20 Laps
6	GT500	32	(Japan) cdmaOne Toyota Team Cerumo	(Japan) Takayuki Kinoshita (Japan) Masahiko Kondo (Japan) Hironori Takeuchi	Toyota 3S-GTE 2.1 L Turbo I4	B	208	+ 20 Laps
7	**GTS**	**60**	**(Japan) Team Goh (United Kingdom) Chamberlain Engineering**	**(Japan) Seiji Ara (Japan) Hideki Okada**	**Chrysler Viper GTS-R**	M	**203**	**+ 25 Laps**
7	**GTS**	**60**	**(Japan) Team Goh (United Kingdom) Chamberlain Engineering**	**(Japan) Seiji Ara (Japan) Hideki Okada**	**Chrysler 8.0 L V10**	M	**203**	**+ 25 Laps**
8	GT500	11	(Japan) Endless Sports	(Japan) Takao Wada (Japan) Mitsuhiro Kinoshita (Japan) Yasushi Kikuchi	Nissan Skyline GT-R	Y	200	+ 28 Laps
8	GT500	11	(Japan) Endless Sports	(Japan) Takao Wada (Japan) Mitsuhiro Kinoshita (Japan) Yasushi Kikuchi	Nissan RB26DETT 2.8 L Turbo I6	Y	200	+ 28 Laps
9	GTS	16	(Germany) Freisinger Motorsport	(Germany) Ernst Palmberger (Japan) Yukihiro Hane	Porsche 911 GT2	D	198	+ 30 Laps
9	GTS	16	(Germany) Freisinger Motorsport	(Germany) Ernst Palmberger (Japan) Yukihiro Hane	Porsche 3.6 L Turbo Flat-6	D	198	+ 30 Laps
10	**GT**	**81**	**(Japan) Team Taisan Advan**	**(Japan) Hideshi Matsuda (Germany) Dominik Schwager**	**Porsche 911 GT3-R**	Y	**197**	**+ 31 Laps**
10	**GT**	**81**	**(Japan) Team Taisan Advan**	**(Japan) Hideshi Matsuda (Germany) Dominik Schwager**	**Porsche 3.6 L Flat-6**	Y	**197**	**+ 31 Laps**
11	GTS	69	(Germany) Proton Competition	(Germany) Gerold Ried (Germany) Christian Ried (Austria) Manfred Jurasz	Porsche 911 GT2	Y	185	+ 43 laps
11	GTS	69	(Germany) Proton Competition	(Germany) Gerold Ried (Germany) Christian Ried (Austria) Manfred Jurasz	Porsche 3.6 L Turbo Flat-6	Y	185	+ 43 laps
12	GTS	15	(Germany) Freisinger Motorsport	(Germany) Wolfgang Kaufmann (France) Bob Wollek	Porsche 911 GT2	D	180	+ 48 laps
12	GTS	15	(Germany) Freisinger Motorsport	(Germany) Wolfgang Kaufmann (France) Bob Wollek	Porsche 3.6 L Turbo Flat-6	D	180	+ 48 laps
13	**GT300**	**91**	**(Japan) 910 Racing**	**(Japan) Masamitsu Ishihara (Japan) Keiichi Takahashi (Japan) Tomohiko Sunako**	**Porsche 911 3.8 RSR**	Y	**178**	**+ 50 Laps**
13	**GT300**	**91**	**(Japan) 910 Racing**	**(Japan) Masamitsu Ishihara (Japan) Keiichi Takahashi (Japan) Tomohiko Sunako**	**Porsche 3.8 L Flat-6**	Y	**178**	**+ 50 Laps**
14	GT	65	Roock Sport System Japan	(Japan) Manabu Orido (Japan) Takashi Suzuki (Japan) Tomiko Yoshikawa	Porsche 911 3.8 RSR	Y	176	+ 52 Laps
14	GT	65	Roock Sport System Japan	(Japan) Manabu Orido (Japan) Takashi Suzuki (Japan) Tomiko Yoshikawa	Porsche 3.8 L Flat-6	Y	176	+ 52 Laps
15	GT	17	(Germany) Freisinger Motorsport	(Japan) Katsunori Iketani (Japan) Hiroyuki Nodi	Porsche 911 GT2	D	167	+ 61 Laps
15	GT	17	(Germany) Freisinger Motorsport	(Japan) Katsunori Iketani (Japan) Hiroyuki Nodi	Porsche 3.6 L Turbo Flat-6	D	167	+ 61 Laps
16 NC	GT300	70	(Japan) Team Gaikokuya	(Japan) Yoshimi Ishibashi (Belgium) Patrick van Schoote (Japan) Jun Harada	Porsche 911 GT2	Y	157	+ 71 Laps
16 NC	GT300	70	(Japan) Team Gaikokuya	(Japan) Yoshimi Ishibashi (Belgium) Patrick van Schoote (Japan) Jun Harada	Porsche 3.6 L Turbo Flat-6	Y	157	+ 71 Laps
17 NC	GT	80	(Japan) Team Taisan Advan	(Japan) Eiichi Tajima (Japan) Hiroaki Suga (Japan) Morio Nitta	Porsche 911 3.8 RSR	Y	155	+ 73 Laps
17 NC	GT	80	(Japan) Team Taisan Advan	(Japan) Eiichi Tajima (Japan) Hiroaki Suga (Japan) Morio Nitta	Porsche 3.8 L Flat-6	Y	155	+ 73 Laps
18 NC	GT500	28	(Japan) Tomei Sport	(Japan) Kazuyuki Nishizawa (Japan) Takuya Kurosawa (United Kingdom) Peter Dumbreck	Porsche 911 3.8 RSR	Y	115	+ 113 Laps
18 NC	GT500	28	(Japan) Tomei Sport	(Japan) Kazuyuki Nishizawa (Japan) Takuya Kurosawa (United Kingdom) Peter Dumbreck	Porsche 3.8 L Flat-6	Y	115	+ 113 Laps
19 DNF	LMP	24	(Japan) Autoexe Motorsports	(Japan) Yojiro Terada (Japan) Keichi Satou (France) Franck Fréon	Autoexe LMP99	Y	158	out of fuel
19 DNF	LMP	24	(Japan) Autoexe Motorsports	(Japan) Yojiro Terada (Japan) Keichi Satou (France) Franck Fréon	Ford (Roush) 6.0 L V8	Y	158	out of fuel
20 DNF	LMGTP	21	(Japan) Hitotsuyama Racing	(Japan) Akira Iida (Japan) Yasushi Hitotsuyama (Japan) Mikio Hitotsuyama	McLaren F1 GTR	D	147	rear hub
20 DNF	LMGTP	21	(Japan) Hitotsuyama Racing	(Japan) Akira Iida (Japan) Yasushi Hitotsuyama (Japan) Mikio Hitotsuyama	BMW S70 6.0 L V12	D	147	rear hub
21 DNF	GTS	10	(Japan) Ability Motorsports	(Japan) Hidehiko Asou (Japan) Yasutaka Hinoi (Japan) Atsushi Yogou	Porsche 911 GT2	Y	74	transmission
21 DNF	GTS	10	(Japan) Ability Motorsports	(Japan) Hidehiko Asou (Japan) Yasutaka Hinoi (Japan) Atsushi Yogou	Porsche 3.6 L Turbo Flat-6	Y	74	transmission
22 DNF	GTS	56	(United Kingdom) Chamberlain Engineering	(Belgium) Vincent Vosse (France) Xavier Pompidou	Chrysler Viper GTS-R	M	40	clutch
22 DNF	GTS	56	(United Kingdom) Chamberlain Engineering	(Belgium) Vincent Vosse (France) Xavier Pompidou	Chrysler 8.0 L V10	M	40	clutch
23 DNF	GTS	64	Roock Racing System Japan	(Japan) Hisashi Wada (France) Stéphane Ortelli	Porsche 911 GT2	Y	40	mechanical
23 DNF	GTS	64	Roock Racing System Japan	(Japan) Hisashi Wada (France) Stéphane Ortelli	Porsche 3.6 L Turbo Flat-6	Y	40	mechanical

=== Statistics ===
- Pole Position – #1 Toyota Motorsport – 1:16.349
- Fastest Lap – #1 Toyota Motorsport – 1:18.806
- Average Speed – 180.792 km/h

== Post-race ==
Although the race was very competitive for Japanese manufacturer's Nissan and Toyota, the event was not considered a major success. Only twenty three entrants showed in total, with just sixteen being in the ACO's classes. Although Nissan and Toyota both had more cars they could have entered, each chose only to compete with a single car. A large number of European teams which had been on the entry list also failed to show up, most notably BMW Motorsport with their V12 LMR prototypes.

Toyota and Nissan had both decided to abandon their sportscar efforts after 1999, meaning neither team took their automatic entries for Le Mans in 2000. European interest in the series was also lacking, especially since teams like BMW and Audi seemed more interested in competing in the American Le Mans Series. This left the proposed series with no major manufacturer involvement to help bring in fans as well as other competition.

Consideration for a Japanese series was revived once again in late 2000 when Don Panoz and the International Motor Sports Association (IMSA) announced their intentions to expand upon their American Le Mans Series, a series endorsed by the ACO. Panoz would plan an Asian-Pacific Le Mans Series (APLMS), competing throughout the entire Pacific rim. An exhibition event, the Race of a Thousand Years, was held in Australia at the end of 2000 with mixed success, with another event played for Malaysia in 2001. However Panoz's other expansion outside the United States, the European Le Mans Series, would suffer from small fields and lack of competition throughout 2001. With a continued lack of interest from major manufacturers in teams in the ELMS as well as the APLMS, both series would be cancelled.

In 2006, the ACO was finally able to create a new sports car series in Japan with the launch of the Japan Le Mans Challenge. However, the series suffered from poor number of entries and was replaced by Asian Le Mans Series in 2009, but that series did not run another race again until 2013, by which time Toyota had returned to Le Mans with the TS030 Hybrid.

== See also ==
- Fuji Grand Champion Series
- Fuji Long Distance Series
- Japan Le Mans Challenge
