= SARD MC8-R =

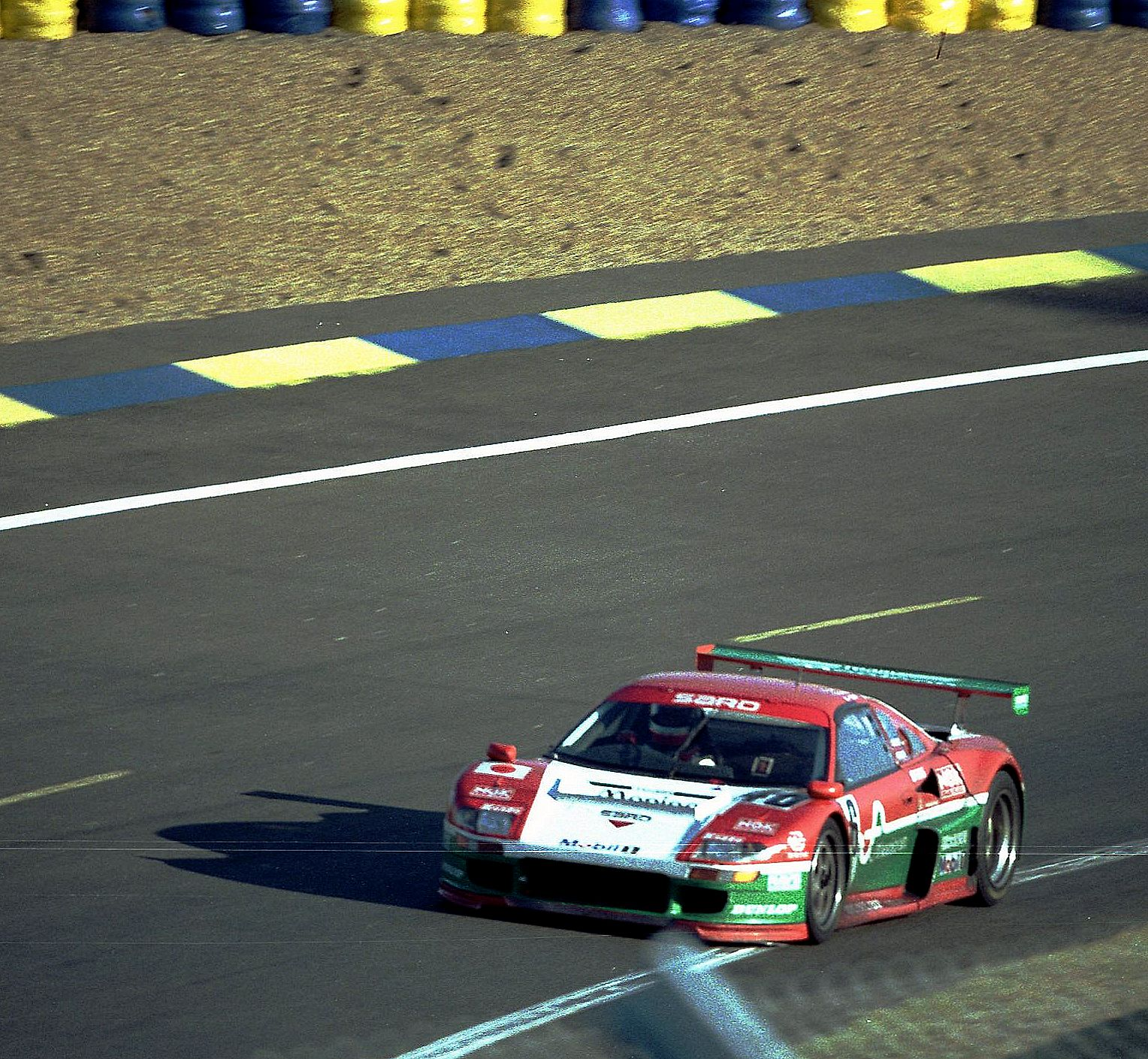
- Category: FIA GT1
- Constructor: SARD

Technical specifications
- Chassis: Hybrid steel aluminum
- Suspension (front): Double wishbone
- Suspension (rear): Same as front
- Length: 4,540 mm (178.7 in)
- Width: 1,920 mm (75.6 in)
- Height: 1,132 mm (44.6 in)
- Engine: Toyota 1UZ-FE 4,000 cc V8 Twin turbocharged Mid-engined, longitudinally mounted
- Transmission: Hewland 6-speed manual (1995, 1997); March 5-speed manual (1996)
- Power: 580 ps @ 6,100 rpm (1995); 580 ps @ 7,000 rpm (1996); 664 ps @ 7,000 rpm (1997)
- Weight: 1,273 kg (2,806 lb) (1995); 1,061 kg (2,339 lb) (1996); 1,000 kg (2,205 lb) (1997)
- Tyres: Dunlop, Yokohama, Michelin

Competition history
- Notable entrants: SARD
- Notable drivers: (France) Alain Ferté; (United Kingdom) Kenny Acheson; (Italy) Mauro Martini; (United States) Jeff Krosnoff; (France) Pascal Fabre; (Japan) Naoki Nagasaka
- Debut: 1995 24 Hours of Le Mans
- Last season: 1997
Races	Wins	Poles	F/Laps
6	0	0	0
- Constructors' Championships: 0
- Drivers' Championships: 0

The Sard MC8-R was a modified and lengthened version of the Toyota MR2 (SW20) built for GT racing by Toyota's SARD (Sigma Advanced Research Development) works team.

SARD heavily modified the front half of the MR2s chassis and completely replaced the rear with a custom setup in order to fit a twin-turbo version of the 4.0-liter 1UZ-FE V8 producing 600 bhp (447 kW). This is the first car which only used the frontal chassis of production and was effectively a purpose-built semi-sports-prototype that successfully got GT1 homologation. The MC8-R lacked pace and was very unreliable which made it often finish at the bottom of the race. Competitors such as the McLaren F1 GTR and Ferrari F40 LM outperformed it along with the GT1 Toyota Supra that was also constructed under Toyota Team SARD.

== SARD MC8 road cars ==
Since the custom rear chassis and numerous dedicated components will lead to significant differences from the original MR2, a homologation road car was to be constructed. SARD built two MC8 road cars in order to meet homologation requirements, a white car for 1995 and a black car for 1997. Both cars came with a detuned 1UZ-FE engine and featured a few differences such as a relocated exhaust pipe and modified road legal tires. For 1997, further aero changes were required, hence the construction of the black-colored road car that year. While sporting different bodywork, it was mechanically similar to that of the 1995 car.

The 1995 car disappeared from the public eye within a year of its construction, but then resurfaced again on the Japanese collector car website SEiyaa in 2015, two decades after its disappearance. The car is currently in possession of a private collector as the listing has since been removed from SEiyaa, who has registered the car for road use in Japan. After being seen at a few JGTC races in 1997 and 1998 as well as being featured in a few Japanese magazines, the 1997 car disappeared from the public eye not long afterwards and was last seen at a garage yard seemingly abandoned, with the car being mostly intact minus the powertrain.

== 1995 and 1996 ==
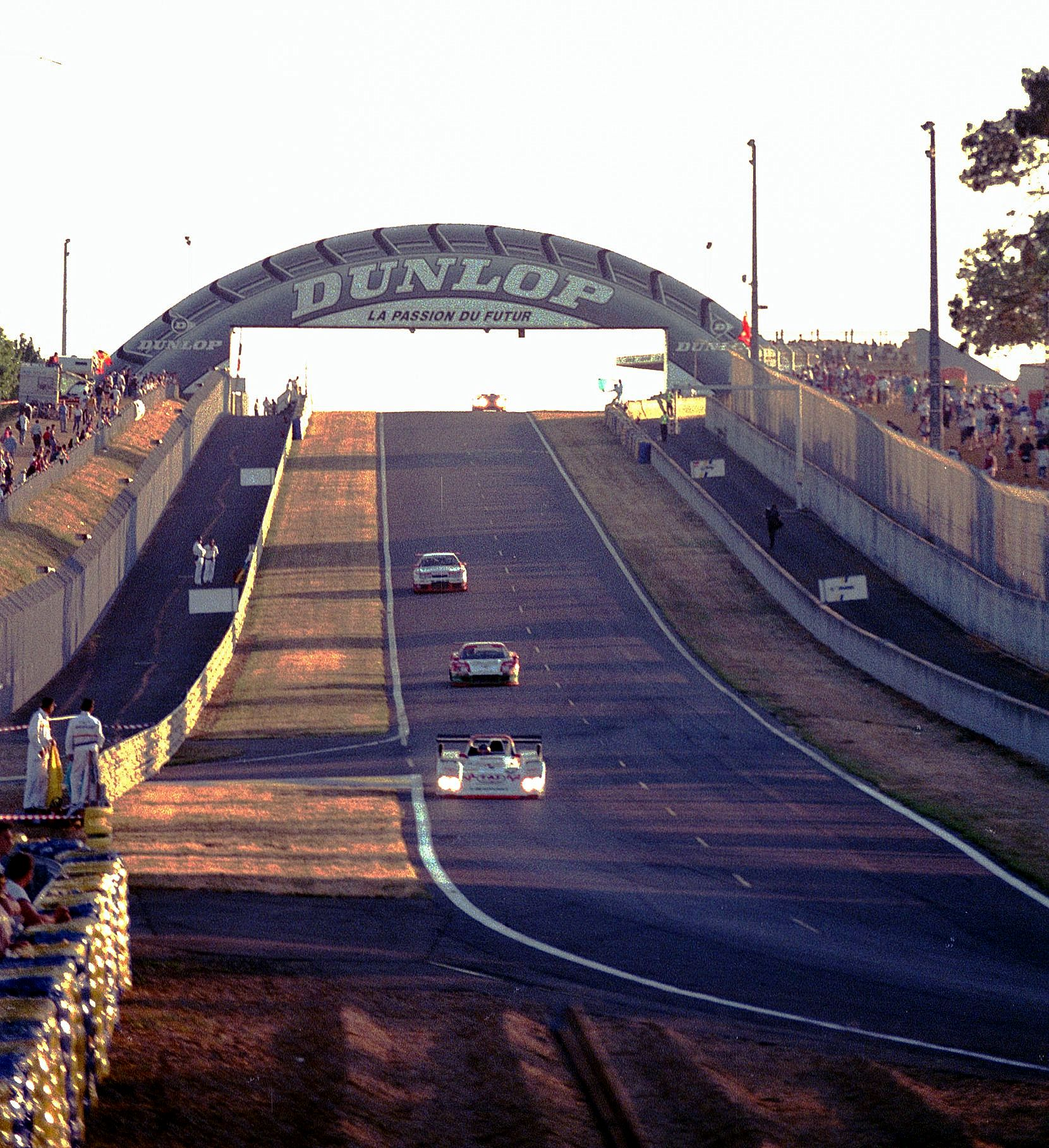
SARD MC8-R - Alain Ferte, Pascal Fabre & Mauro Martini on the run down from Dunlop Bridge to the Esses behind TWR WSC-95 Porsche - Michele Alboreto, Didier Theys & Pierluigi Martini at the 1996 Le Mans

- The MC8-R participated 1995 BPR Global GT Series which is the first purpose-built semi-sports-prototype that successfully got GT1 homologation which inspired 911 GT1 that kind of homologation specialists which planted a foreshadowing for the cancellation of GT1.
- The MC8-R made its first outing in the 1995 24 Hours of Le Mans piloted by Alain Ferté, Kenny Acheson, and Tomiko Yoshikawa. It retired after 14 laps. Later that year the car attempted the 1000km Suzuka, this time managing to finish 26th overall.
- One MC8-R was entered in the 1996 24 Hours of Le Mans, piloted by Masanori Sekiya, Hidetoshi Mitsusada, and Masami Kageyama. The team qualified 37th and finished 24th, the second-to-last team of those who had finished.

== 1997 ==
- The team also entered the 1997 24 Hours of Le Mans, but driver Olivier Grouillard failed to make it past pre-qualifying. Two cars were also entered in the FIA GT Championship round at the 1997 Suzuka 1000km (one by Team Menicon SARD and one entered by IDC Otsuka Kagu SARD), but neither car managed to finish. It was replaced the following year with the Toyota GT-One.

== See also ==
- Toyota MR2
