= Alain Ferté =

French racing driver (born 1955)

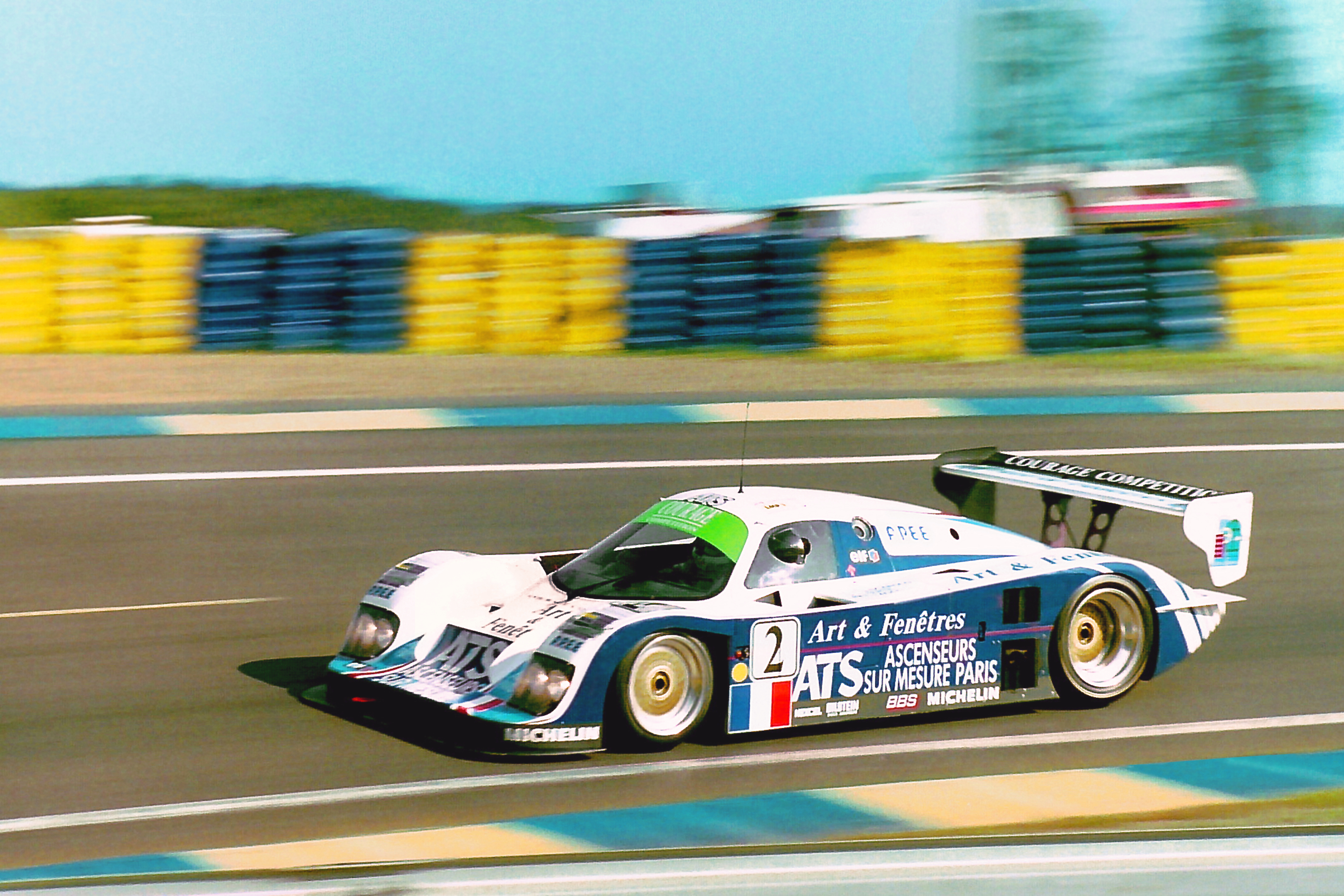
- Ferté in 1994
- Nationality: French
- Born: Alain Serge Léon Ferté; 8 October 1955 (age 71) Falaise, France
- Relatives: Michel Ferté (brother)

International Formula 3000
- Categorisation: FIA Gold (until 2014); FIA Silver (2015); FIA Bronze (2016–)
- Years active: 1985–1989
- Teams: Lola, non-works March, non-works AGS, non-works Reynard
- Starts: 25
- Wins: 0
- Best finish: 2nd in 1985 (Spa)

Previous series
- ?–1979 1980–? 1982–1984: Championnat de France Formule Renault; French Formula Three Championship; European Formula Two Championship

Championship titles
- 1979 1980: Championnat de France Formule Renault; French Formula Three Championship

24 Hours of Le Mans career
- Years: 1983–2012
- Teams: Ford France-Rondeau, Brun Motorsport-Porsche, non-works Nissan, Tom Walkinshaw Racing-Jaguar, Sauber-Mercedes, Peugeot, Courage, SARD-Toyota, non-works Ferrari, non-works Porsche, non-works Rondeau
- Best finish: 8th (1989)
- Class wins: 0

Alain Serge Léon Ferté (born 8 October 1955 in Falaise, Calvados) is a French professional racing driver. He is the elder brother of Michel Ferté, who was also a professional racing driver.

Ferté competed five seasons in Formula 3000 (1985–1989). He won the 1979 French Formula Renault Championship and the 1980 French F3 championship.

In 1993 and 1994, Ferté raced in the Spanish Touring Car Championship driving a BMW M3 and then a BMW 318iS. He finished the 1993 on the third place in the final standings with one victory and three podiums, while the following year, finished second with four victories and four podium. In 1994, he also competed in the 24h of Spa arriving second always driving a BMW 318iS.

Ferté has also competed in prototype and GT racing for many years, driving cars such as the Porsche 911 GT1, Toyota MR2-based SARD MC8-R and Maserati MC12 GT1, and entering the 24 Hours of Le Mans fourteen times. He set pole position at the 1994 edition driving a Courage C32.

In 2013, Ferté was named by Autosport as one of the top 50 drivers who never raced in Formula One.

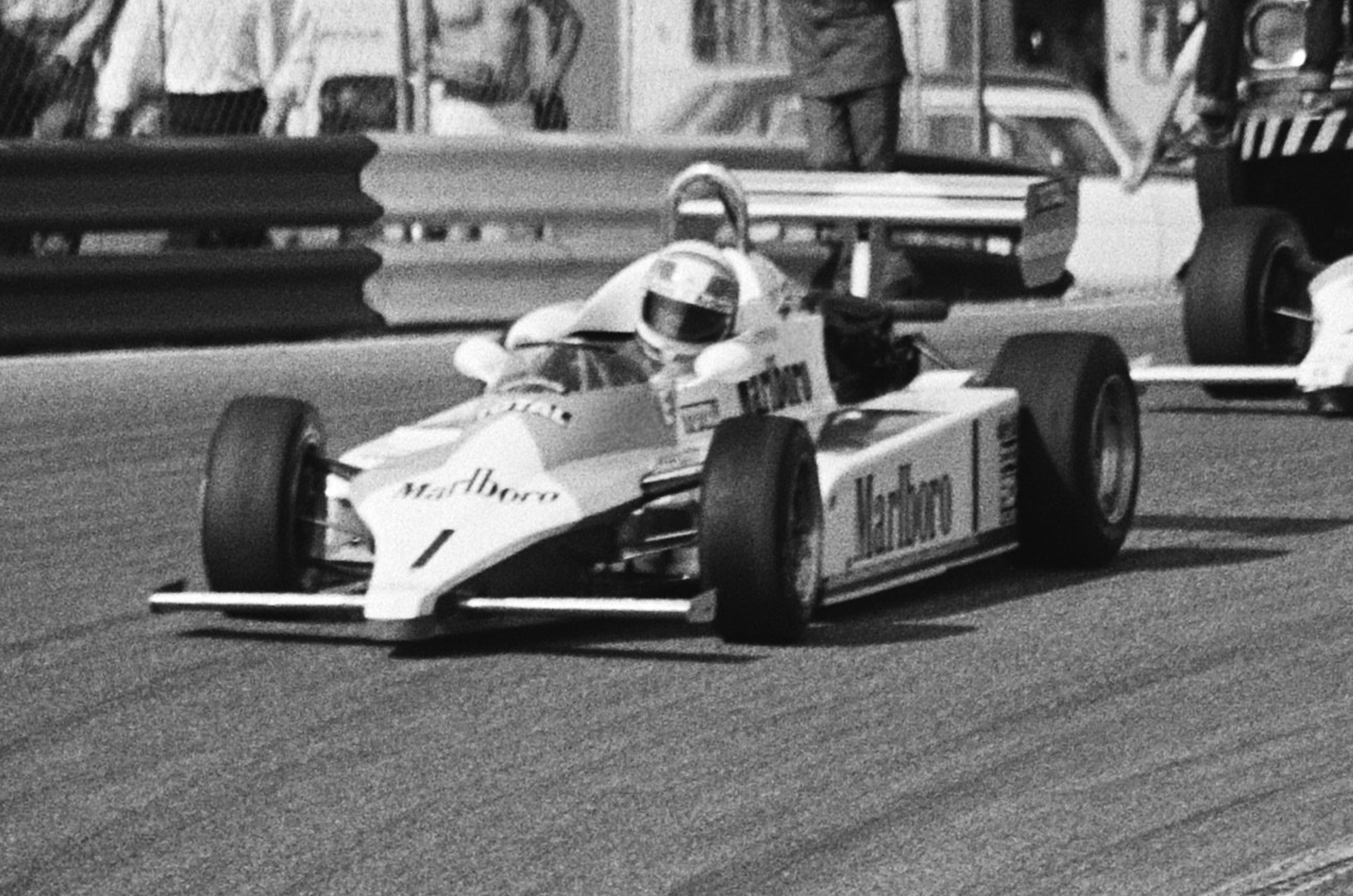
Ferté racing in Formula 3 at Zandvoort in 1982.

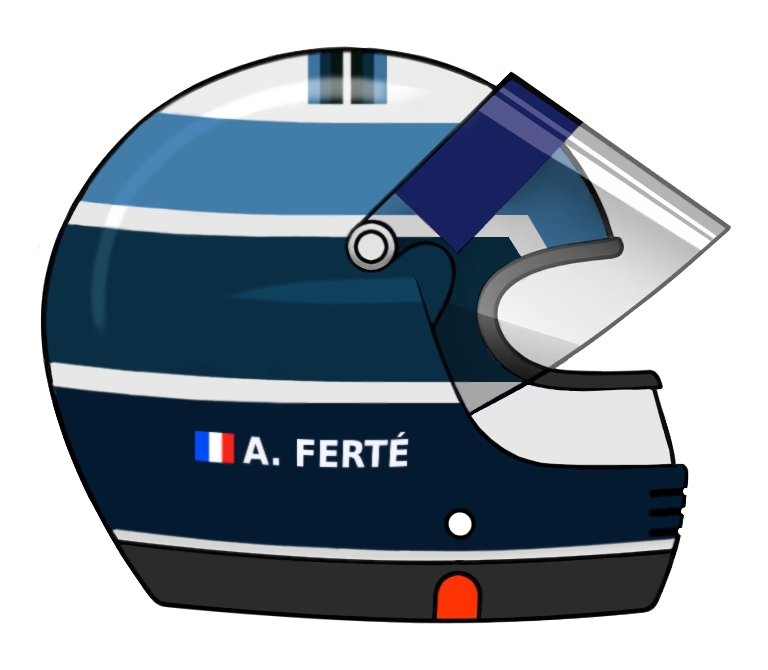
Alain Ferté's helmet.

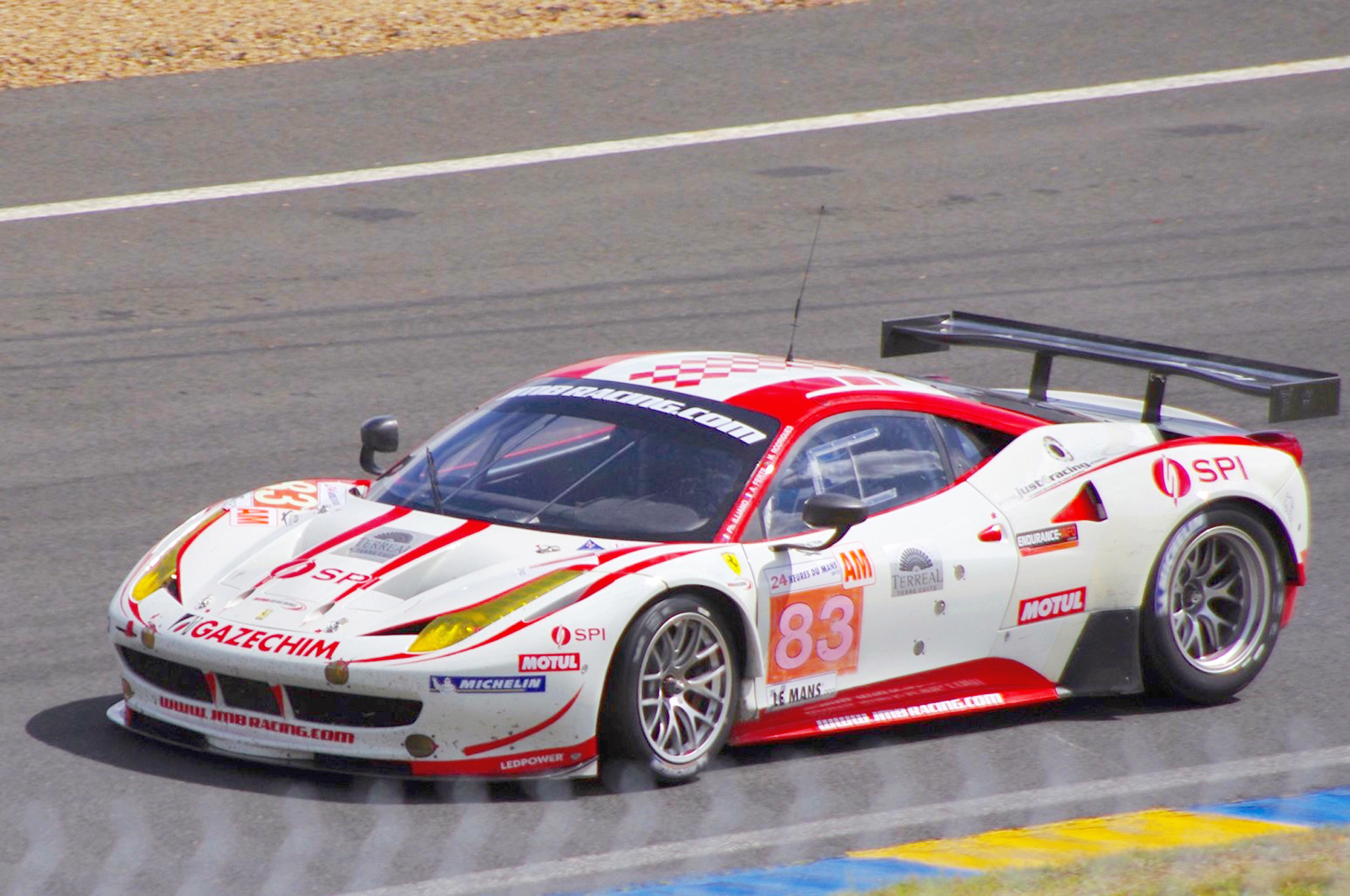
The JMB Ferrari 458 in which Ferté made his final Le Mans start in 2012.

== Racing record ==
=== Complete European Formula Two Championship results ===
(key)

Year	Entrant	Chassis	Engine	1	2	3	4	5	6	7	8	9	10	11	12	13	Pos	Pts
1982	Maurer Motorsport	Maurer MM82	BMW	SIL	HOC	THR	NÜR	MUG	VAL	PAU	SPA	HOC; Ret	DON	MAN	PER	MIS	NC	0
1983	Maurer Motorsport	Maurer MM83	BMW	SIL; Ret	THR; 14	HOC; 12	NÜR; 5	VAL; 14	PAU; DSQ	JAR; 5	DON; Ret	MIS	PER	ZOL	MUG		14th	4
1984	Martini Racing	Martini 002	BMW	SIL	HOC	THR	VAL	MUG	PAU; 5	HOC	MIS	PER	DON	BRH			14th	2

=== Complete International Formula 3000 results ===
(key)

Year	Entrant	Chassis	Engine	1	2	3	4	5	6	7	8	9	10	11	12	Pos.	Pts
1985	Lola Motorsport	Lola T950	Cosworth	SIL; 8	THR; 12	EST; 7	NÜR; C	VAL; Ret								9th	10
1985	Corbari Italia	March 85B	Cosworth						PAU; Ret	SPA; 2	DIJ; 4	PER	ÖST	ZAN		9th	10
1985	Equipe Oreca	March 85B	Cosworth												DON; 6	9th	10
1986	ITI 3000	March 86B	Cosworth	SIL; 13	VAL; Ret	PAU; Ret	SPA; 14	IMO; 3	MUG; 7	PER; 18	ÖST					14th	4
1986	Oreca Motorsport	March 86B	Cosworth									BIR; Ret				14th	4
1986	Equipe Danielson	AGS JH20B	Cosworth										BUG; Ret	JAR; Ret		14th	4
1987	First Racing	March 87B	Cosworth	SIL	VAL	SPA	PAU	DON	PER	BRH	BIR	IMO	BUG; Ret	JAR		NC	0
1988	First Racing	March 88B	Judd	JER	VAL	PAU	SIL	MNZ	PER	BRH	BIR	BUG; 12	ZOL	DIJ		NC	0
1989	CoBRa Motorsport	Reynard 89D	Cosworth	SIL	VAL; 6	PAU; 5	JER	PER	BRH	BIR	SPA; Ret	BUG; Ret	DIJ; 13			16th	3

=== 24 Hours of Le Mans results ===
Year	Team	Co-Drivers	Car	Class	Laps	Pos.	Class Pos.
1983	Ford France	(France) Jean Rondeau (France) Michel Ferté	Rondeau M482-Ford Cosworth	C	90	DNF	DNF
1984	(United States) McCormack and Dodge	(United States) Jim Mullen (United States) Walt Bohren	Rondeau M482-Ford Cosworth	C1	293	13th	10th
1986	(Switzerland) Brun Motorsport	(Belgium) Thierry Boutsen (Belgium) Didier Theys	Porsche 956	C1	89	DNF	DNF
1987	(Japan) Italya Sports	(Sweden) Anders Olofsson (France) Patrick Gonin	Nissan R86V	C1	86	DNF	DNF
1989	(United Kingdom) Silk Cut Jaguar (United Kingdom) Tom Walkinshaw Racing	(France) Michel Ferté (Chile) Eliseo Salazar	Jaguar XJR-9LM	C1	368	8th	7th
1990	(United Kingdom) Silk Cut Jaguar (United Kingdom) Tom Walkinshaw Racing	(United Kingdom) Martin Brundle (United Kingdom) David Leslie	Jaguar XJR-12	C1	220	DNF	DNF
1991	(Germany) Team Sauber Mercedes	(France) Jean-Louis Schlesser (Germany) Jochen Mass	Mercedes-Benz C11	C2	319	DNF	DNF
1992	(France) Peugeot Talbot Sport	(Austria) Karl Wendlinger (Belgium) Eric van de Poele	Peugeot 905 Evo 1B	C1	208	DNF	DNF
1994	(France) Courage Compétition	(France) Henri Pescarolo (France) Franck Lagorce	Courage C32LM-Porsche	LMP1; C90	142	DNF	DNF
1995	(Japan) SARD Co. Ltd.	(United Kingdom) Kenny Acheson (Japan) Tomiko Yoshikawa	SARD MC8-R-Toyota	GT1	14	DNF	DNF
1996	(Japan) Team Menicon SARD Co. Ltd.	(Italy) Mauro Martini (France) Pascal Fabre	SARD MC8-R-Toyota	GT1	256	24th	15th
1997	(France) JB Racing	(Germany) Jürgen von Gartzen (France) Olivier Thévenin	Porsche 911 GT1	GT1	236	DNF	DNF
2008	(Monaco) JMB Racing (United Kingdom) Aucott Racing	(United Kingdom) Ben Aucott (France) Stéphane Daoudi	Ferrari F430 GT2	GT2	312	25th	4th
2012	(Monaco) JMB Racing	(France) Philippe Illiano (Portugal) Manuel Rodrigues	Ferrari 458 Italia GTC	GTE; Am	292	32nd	7th

=== Complete Bathurst 1000 results ===
Year	Team	Co-drivers	Car	Class	Laps	Overall position	Class position
1989	(Australia) Glenn Seton Racing	(Australia) Tony Noske (Australia) Glenn Seton	Ford Sierra RS500	1	92	DNF	DNF

=== Complete JGTC results ===
(key) (Races in bold indicate pole position) (Races in italics indicate fastest lap)

Year	Team	Car	Class	1	2	3	4	5	6	DC	Pts
1996	Toyota Team SARD	Toyota Supra	GT500	SUZ; 17	FUJ; 3	SEN; 4	FUJ; 9	SUG; 7	MIN	9th	28

Sporting positions
Preceded by Philippe Alliot	Championnat de France Formule Renault Champion; 1979	Succeeded by Denis Morin
Preceded by Alain Prost	French Formula Three; Champion; 1980	Succeeded by Philippe Streiff
