= Nissan R391 =

Le Mans prototype race car (1999)

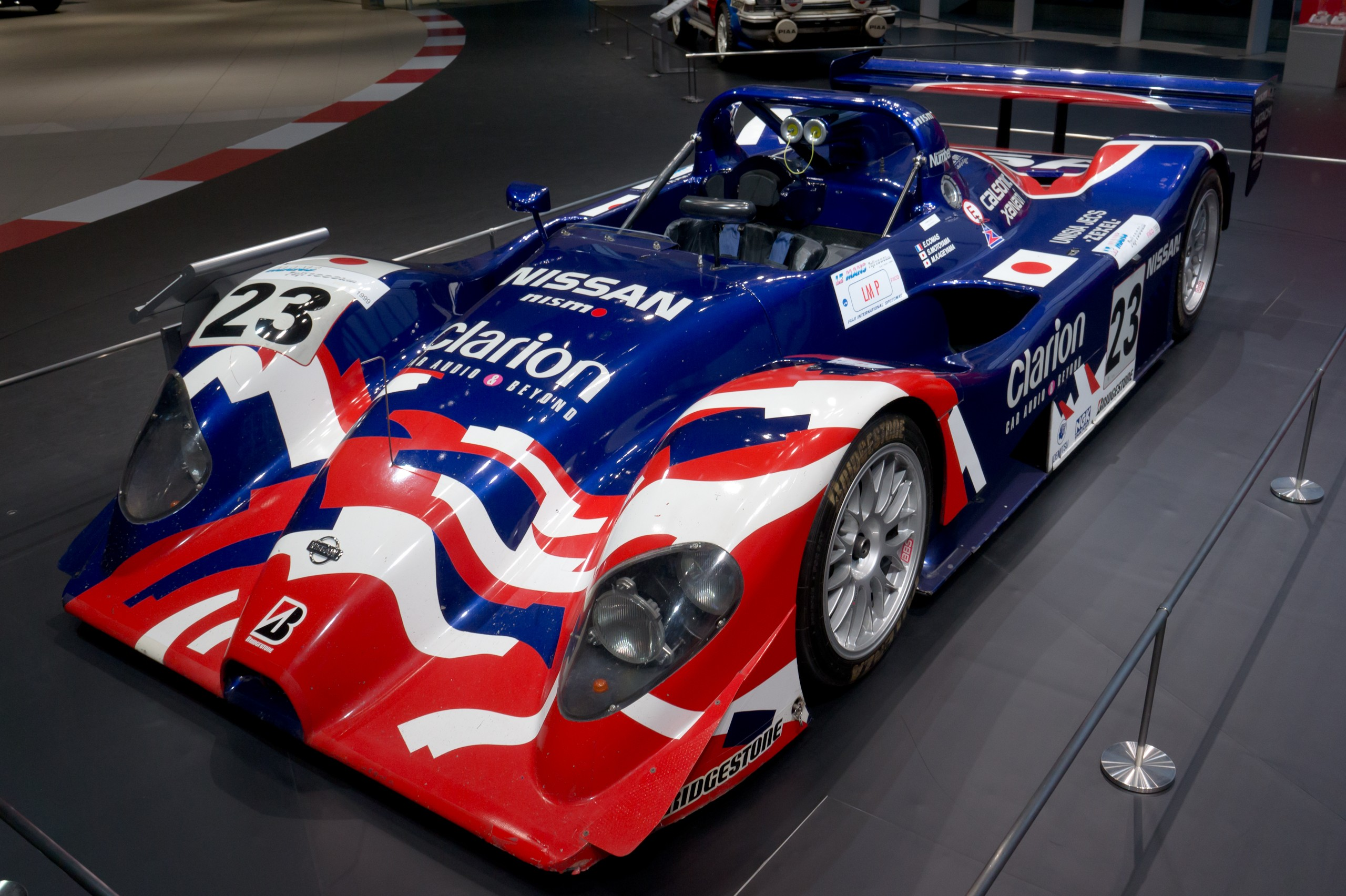
- Category: Le Mans Prototype
- Designers: Nigel Stroud; Doug Skinner
- Predecessor: Nissan R390 GT1
- Successor: Nissan GT-R LM Nismo

Technical specifications
- Engine: Nissan VRH50A 5.0L V8 Naturally Aspirated
- Power: 650 hp (478 kW)
- Tires: Bridgestone

Competition history
- Notable entrants: (Japan) Nissan Motorsports
- Notable drivers: (France) Érik Comas (Japan) Satoshi Motoyama (Germany) Michael Krumm (Belgium) Eric van de Poele
- Debut: 1999 24 Hours of Le Mans
- First win: 1999 Le Mans Fuji 1000km
- Last win: 1999 Le Mans Fuji 1000km
- Last event: 1999 Le Mans Fuji 1000km
Races	Wins	Podiums	Poles	F/Laps
2	1	1	0	0

The Nissan R391 is a prototype racing car built by Nissan and their motorsports counterpart Nismo for competition at the 1999 24 Hours of Le Mans. It was a replacement for the R390 GT1, which was no longer legal in its production-based class.

== History ==
Following Nissan's return to sportscar racing in 1995, motorsports division Nismo had been slowly climbing its way up the competition ladder to finally reach the top Le Mans prototype class. Starting with Skyline GT-R LMs in 1995, Nismo turned to developing the advanced R390 GT1 in 1997, which was effectively as close to a prototype as possible while still remaining street legal.

With major rule changes in the GT in 1999, major manufacturers were no longer able to build homologation specials which resembled prototypes more than true GT cars. Thus Mercedes-Benz, Toyota, Panoz, BMW, and Audi turned to the prototypes class, either using open cockpit prototypes or closed cockpit cars which were actually evolutions of their former GT cars. Nissan, believing that a purpose built prototype would be superior to an evolved GT car, decided to go the route of an open cockpit.

Nissan turned to the UK based firm G-Force Technologies to design and build the R391. Nigel Stroud would head up the car's design alongside Doug Skinner as the chief designer and Glenn Elgood as the race team fabricator. Nissan also formed a partnership with a longtime customer of its second hand sportscars, Courage Compétition. As part of a deal between the two, Nissan would give VRH35L 3.5L turbocharged V8 motors (left over from the R390 GT1) to Courage for use on their own prototype, while Nissan would in return gain expertise from Courage for use on the R391. Nissan would also buy a Courage C52 chassis to run under their own team in order to have reliability in case the R391s suffered from mechanical gremlins, with the 1999 24 Hours of Le Mans being their first race with the C52.

For the R391, Nissan would decide to use a new version of the VH engine, opting to no longer use turbocharging as they had on the VRH35L. Instead, a modified naturally aspirated version would be constructed, named the VRH50A. At a larger 5.0 liters, the engine was able to overcome the loss of its turbocharging while still maintaining the benefits of the original VRH35L design.

== Race results ==
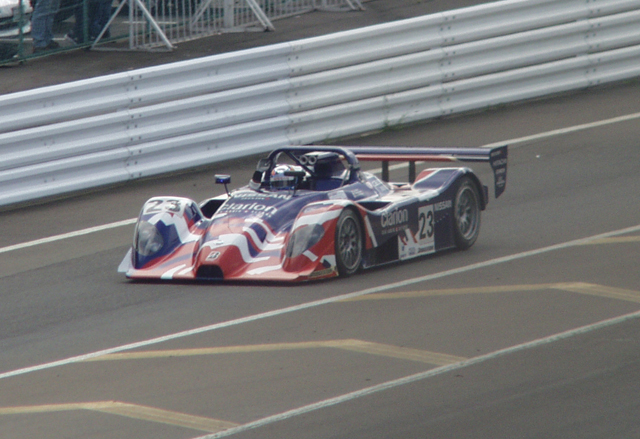
One of the Nissan R391s.

At the 1999 24 Hours of Le Mans, Nissan planned to enter two R391s along with a third Courage C52 with the older VRH35L motor. In official testing for Le Mans in May, the R391s were able to set the 10th and 13th fastest times, beating some entries from Mercedes-Benz, Audi, and BMW, although they were not able to beat Panoz or their main rival, Toyota.

Come the actual race, Nissan was again quick, with one entry able to qualify 12th. Unfortunately, the other R391, while being driven by Eric van de Poele, crashed during the first qualifying session, damaging the car beyond repair. Van de Poele also suffered a broken vertebra in the accident, but would be able to recover. Thus Nissan would be forced to race with only a single R391.

During the race, the remaining R391 was able to climb its way up the field, running as high as 4th overall before an electrical problem in the engine caused the car to be retired after it had completed only 110 laps. Nissan's remaining entrant, their Courage chassis with the older Nissan turbo V8, was able to survive the race and finish a respectable 8th overall. However even this would be bested as Courage Compétition's entry, also using the older Nissan turbo V8, was able to finish 6th overall, eight laps ahead of Nissan's factory effort.

Later in 1999 the R391 would race again, this time at the invitational Fuji 1000km event which was backed by the Le Mans ruling body, the Automobile Club de l'Ouest (ACO). The winners of this race would be able to earn automatic entries to the following year's 24 Hours of Le Mans. Although the event was mostly made up of Japanese teams and thus lacked most major manufacturer teams, Nissan did still have competition from Toyota, who brought out their Toyota GT-One which had beaten the R391 at Le Mans. Both teams entered a single car, but Nissan was able to come out on top, with the R391 defeating the GT-One by a single lap, earning Nissan bragging rights in sportscar racing in Japan.

== Demise ==
Although Nissan was able to gain automatic entry to the 2000 24 Hours of Le Mans with their win at Fuji, Nissan officials decided that the motorsports program was no longer worth the cost, especially with Nissan attempting to restructure itself under new leader Carlos Ghosn. With only a single victory for their sportscar program since 1995, it was decided that Nissan would immediately end the R391 project in early 2000, leaving Nissan's only motorsports program to be in JGTC. Nissan would therefore turn down its automatic entry to the 24 Hours of Le Mans.
