= Toyota GT-One =

Racing car

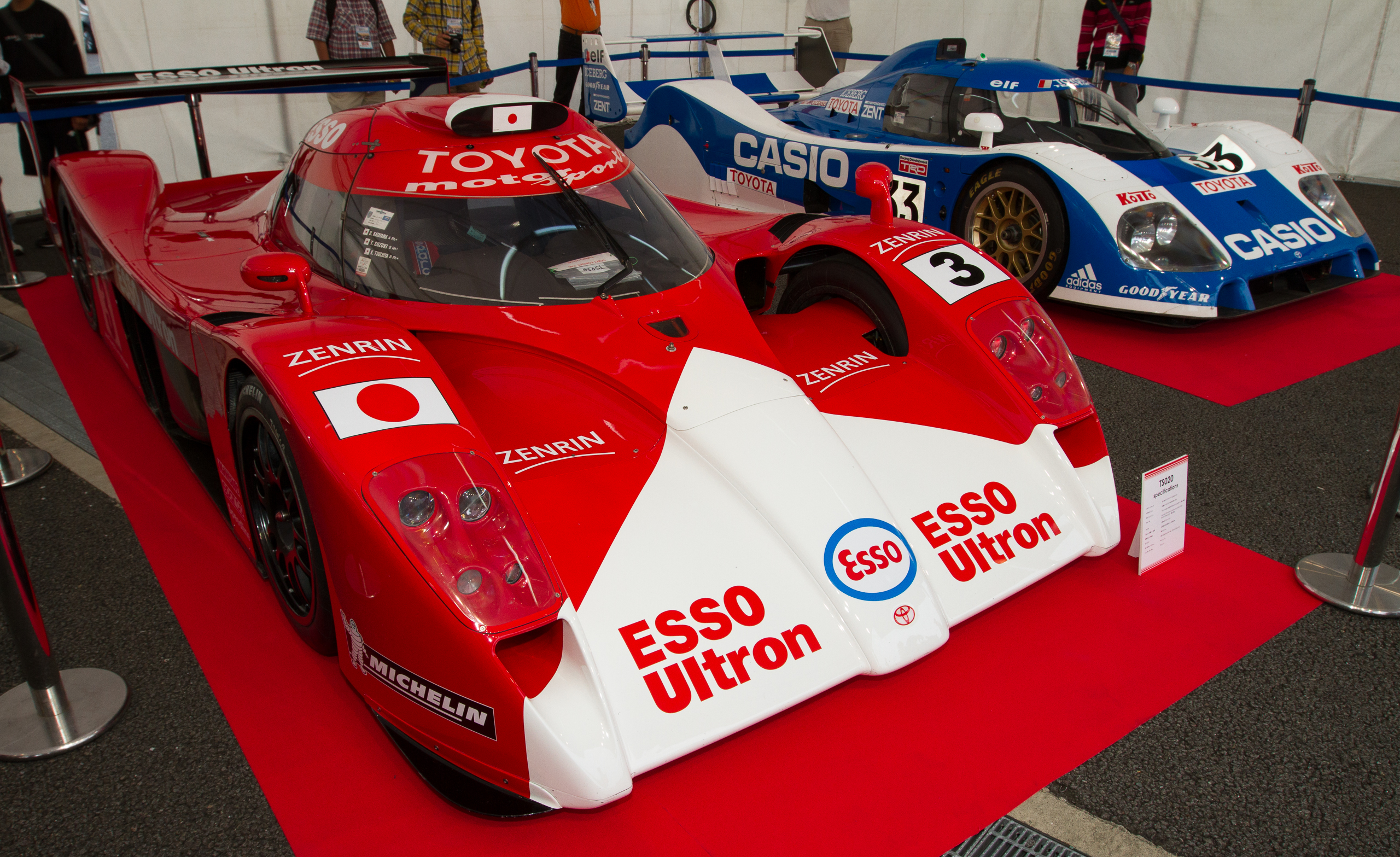
- The No. 3 GT-One on display at the 2012 6 Hours of Fuji
- Category: LMGTP (originally GT1)
- Constructor: Toyota (Dallara)
- Designer: André de Cortanze
- Predecessor: Toyota TS010
- Successor: Toyota TS030 Hybrid

Technical specifications
- Chassis: Carbon fibre and aluminum honeycomb monocoque
- Suspension (front): Independent double wishbone pushrod system
- Suspension (rear): Independent double wishbone pushrod system
- Length: 4,840 mm (190.6 in)
- Width: 2,000 mm (78.7 in)
- Height: 1,125 mm (44.3 in)
- Axle track: 1,600 mm (63.0 in) (front); 1,644 mm (64.7 in) (rear)
- Wheelbase: 2,850 mm (112.2 in)
- Engine: Toyota T836-9 3.6 L (3,578 cc) 90-degree V8, twin-turbocharged, longitudinally mid-mounted
- Torque: 479 lb⋅ft (649.4 N⋅m) @ 6000 rpm
- Transmission: TTE 6-speed sequential
- Power: 600 hp (447.4 kW) @ 6000 rpm
- Fuel: Esso
- Tires: Michelin radial
- Clutch: Sachs quad-plate carbon

Competition history
- Notable entrants: (Japan) Toyota
- Notable drivers: (Japan) Ukyo Katayama (Japan) Toshio Suzuki (Japan) Keiichi Tsuchiya (Belgium) Thierry Boutsen (Germany) Ralf Kelleners (United Kingdom) Geoff Lees (United Kingdom) Martin Brundle (France) Emmanuel Collard (United Kingdom) Allan McNish (France) Éric Hélary (Italy) Vincenzo Sospiri
- Debut: 1998 24 Hours of Le Mans
- Last event: 1999 Le Mans Fuji 1000 km
Races	Wins	Podiums	Poles	F/Laps
3	0 (overall); 2 (class)	2	2	3
- Constructors' Championships: 0
- Drivers' Championships: 0

The Toyota GT-One (model code TS020) is a racing car initially developed for Group GT1 rules, but later adapted into an LMGTP car. It raced in the 1998 and 1999 24 Hours of Le Mans.

== History ==
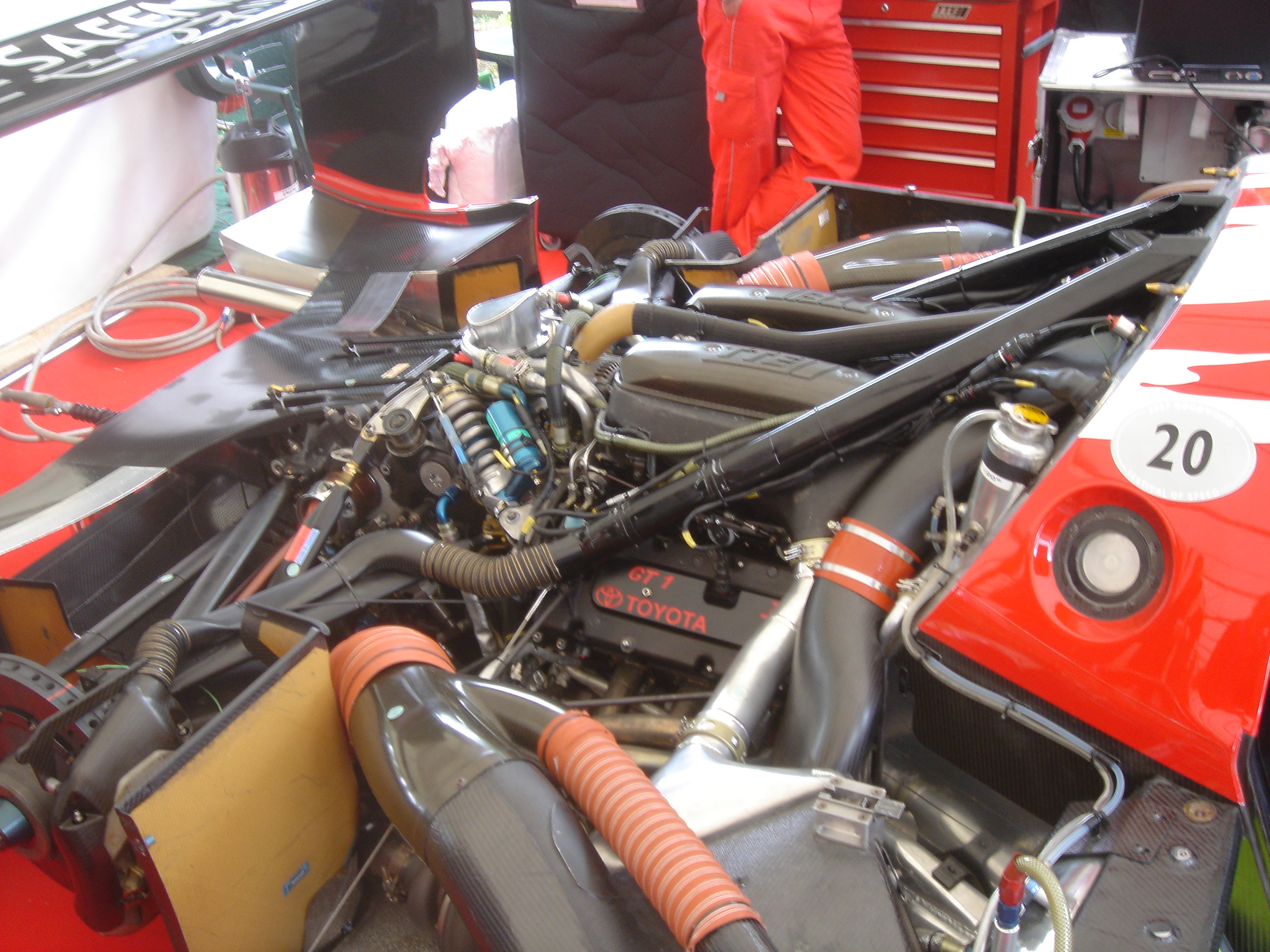
Toyota GT-One engine bay

=== Background ===
Following the end of the Group C era around 1994, Toyota decided to alter its plans in sports car racing by moving to the production-based grand touring (GT) classes for 1995. Toyota decided to use a two-pronged approach with two different competition car models. The first was a heavily modified Toyota Supra, referred to as the Supra LM, which would use a turbocharged Toyota 503E inline-4. The second entry was a purpose-built racing car, with a small number of production cars built to meet homologation regulations. Powered by a turbocharged Toyota 1UZ V8, this car was modified heavily from the Toyota MR2, and became known as the SARD MC8-R. The overall design of the Porsche 911 GT1 was also imitated by the MC8R (wherein the front chassis parts are modified from the original road car, and the rear uses a custom racing structure).

While the Supra performed admirably in 1995, the MC8-R would appear superior in 1996. With its development of high-powered GT race cars, Toyota decided that a car similar to the MC8-R, designed as a race car first and foremost, would be better suited to continue Toyota's GT racing efforts. Thus, Toyota announced they would skip the 1997 24 Hours of Le Mans to be able to develop a new GT car for 1998. (A MC8-R was entered for the 1997 race, but failed to qualify.)

=== Development ===
Turning to Toyota's European arm based in Cologne, Germany, Toyota Team Europe (TTE) and Dallara were tasked with development of the new GT car. With the one-year hiatus, TTE was able to observe what the competition was developing for the GT class, and exploit it to their benefit. In 1997, both the Mercedes-Benz CLK GTR and the Porsche 911 GT1 were dominant cars in their class that exploited loopholes in the rules. Each car was a custom-built supercar, and only a handful of production cars were built to homologate them. TTE realized that they would actually only need to build a single production car in order to meet homologation requirements; since the resulting car would never be sold to a customer, typical driver luxuries could be left out.

Toyota also learned about a loophole which Mercedes-Benz had exploited. All GT-class cars were required to have storage space capable of holding a standard-size suitcase in order for the car to be considered not only production-based, but usable by the public. Mercedes exploited this by putting a small cubby hole into an unused area underneath the rear bodywork, although it was not as easy to access as a normal trunk. Toyota, in their interpretation of the rules, were able to convince Automobile Club de l'Ouest (ACO) officials that the car's fuel tank, normally empty when the car is scrutineered before the race, qualified as trunk space since it could theoretically hold a suitcase.

With these loopholes in place, TTE was able to set out in developing the GT-One. TTE designed and manufactured the car's carbon fibre chassis and bodywork in-house, while Toyota supplied a heavily upgraded version of the engine they originally used on their Group C cars, the twin-turbocharged 3.6 L (220 cu in) R36V V8.

TTE also developed the only two GT-One road cars built, required in order for the race car to qualify as a road car-based grand tourer. They were painted red and fitted with a basic interior. One was put into a museum in Japan, and the other is displayed at Toyota Motorsport GmbH headquarters in Cologne.

== Racing results ==
=== 1998 ===
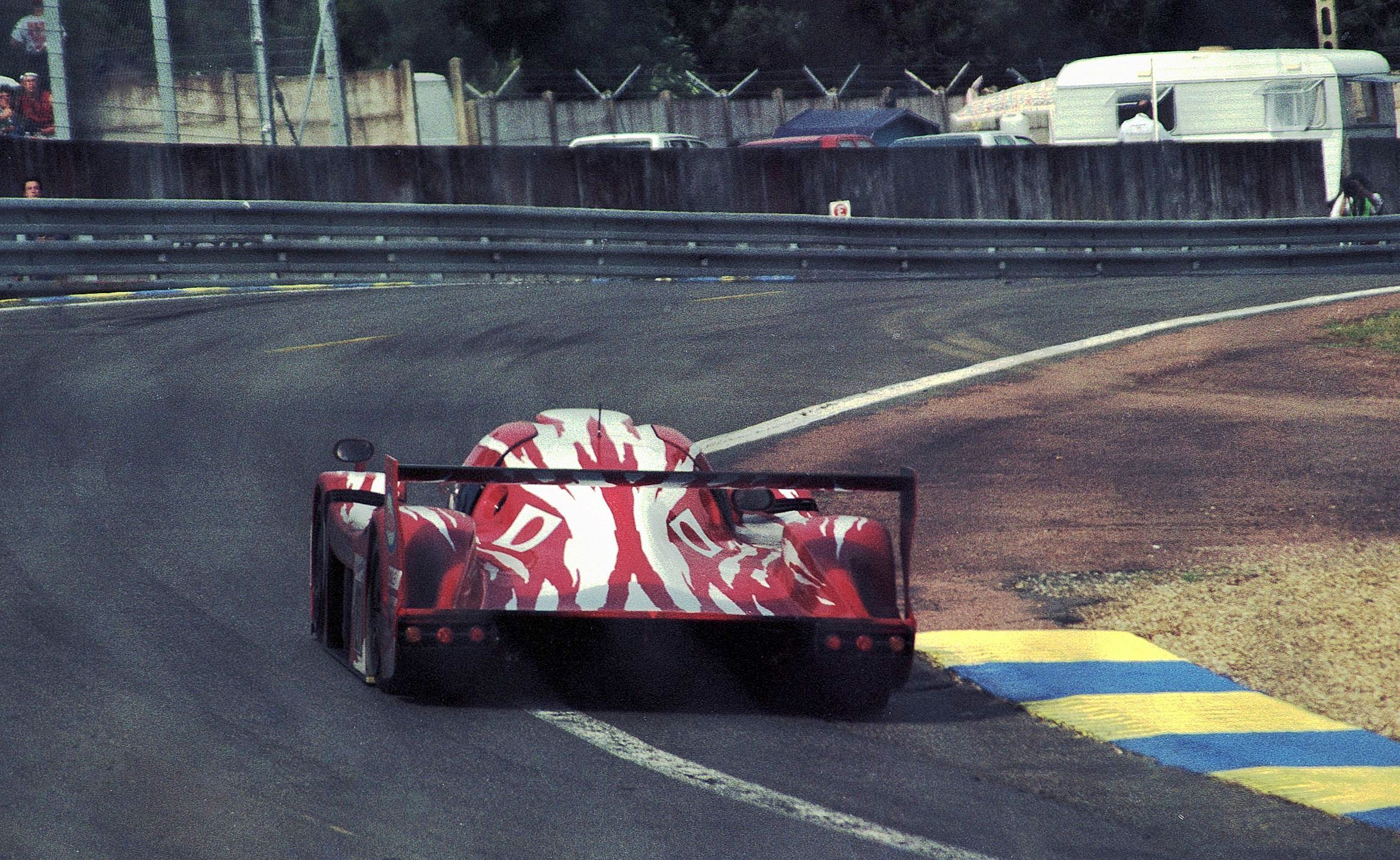
The GT-One during the 1998 24 Hours of Le Mans

Introduced in time for the 1998 24 Hours of Le Mans, the GT-One first appeared during the official testing period for the race held in May. Three GT-Ones appeared, setting the 2nd, 5th, and 10th best times and easily beating out dedicated Le Mans Prototypes (LMPs), which were meant to be the superior class. For the race week itself, all three cars performed admirably in qualifying by continuing their quick pace, qualifying 2nd, 7th, and 8th, and being beaten only by GT class competitor Mercedes-Benz.

During the race itself, the #28 GT-One suffered from a high-speed accident halfway through the race, taking it out of competition. The two other entrants continued to race, both remaining in the top 10. However, within the closing hours, the higher-ranked #29 GT-One suffered a gearbox failure in competition for the win, leaving Toyota to take 9th place in the race with the remaining #27 entry, which ended the race 25 laps behind the winning Porsche 911 GT1.

=== 1999 ===
Following the success of the GT1 class as a whole over the LMP class, the ACO and FIA moved to change the regulations for the GT classes, requiring a large amount of production vehicles for the GT classes and eliminating the original loopholes in the system. Toyota were thus forced to make changes to the GT-One, as were all their competitors in the class. Mercedes-Benz opted to evolve their CLK LM into the CLR in the closed cockpit LMGTP prototype class, while Nissan and Panoz opted for open-cockpit LMPs. Porsche dropped out of competition altogether. Newcomer Audi decided to build cars for both the GTP and LMP classes, while BMW continued in the LMP class as before. Toyota decided to follow the route of Mercedes and evolve the GT-One into a GTP class prototype. Although the CLK-LM required extensive modifications to become the CLR, the GT-One was already close enough to a prototype that an extensive redesign was not needed.

Toyota began an extensive testing program, including a long distance test at Circuit de Spa-Francorchamps in Belgium soon after a snowfall. In the official testing session at Le Mans, the GT-Ones were again fast, taking the 1st, 3rd, and 5th fastest lap times. This pace continued in qualifying for the race, as the three GT-Ones took 1st, 2nd, and 8th positions.

Throughout the race, the GT-Ones battled for the lead with BMW and Mercedes. Unfortunately, the GT-One was hampered by higher fuel consumption (1 or 2 laps less per stint than BMW) and by failures of its Michelin tires throughout the race, mostly caused by sharp gravel which had been accidentally brought onto the racing surface by other cars. The design of the GT-One's wheel wells allowed for a blown tire to cause extensive damage to the mechanical linkages inside; after only 90 laps, the #1 GT-One driven by Martin Brundle was lost when it suffered an explosive tire puncture and was damaged beyond repair, unable to return to the pits and being abandoned on the track. Halfway into the event, the #2 GT-One driven by Thierry Boutsen was involved in a high-speed accident while lapping a slower car, destroying the car and ending Boutsen's racing career. This left the team with only car #3, which was still running at the top of the field. At this point, a large amount of the competition had been eliminated, with all Mercedes cars out of the race due to their famous accident and withdrawal. Audi had also lost two of their four cars, and Nissan had lost their factory-backed R391, although an older Courage C52 campaigned by the team was still active. BMW and Panoz were the only teams continuing without major problems.

During the final hour of the race, the lone GT-One driven by Ukyo Katayama was chasing the remaining BMW for the lead, but suffered a tire failure while lapping traffic. Having lost the chance to challenge for the lead, it was forced to slowly continue along the track to return to the pits for a new set. The lone GT-One would finish 2nd overall, one lap behind the winning BMW. As a consolation prize, the GT-One would win the GTP class, although it was the only car in the class to actually finish.

The GT-One would race once more, a single entrant appearing in the 1999 Le Mans Fuji 1000 km. Although the race mostly consisted of Japanese teams, thus leaving out most of the manufacturers that had competed at Le Mans, Toyota still had to compete against rival Nissan, who entered an R391. In the end, the GT-One would fall short once again, finishing 2nd and only one lap behind the winning R391. However, Toyota won the LMGTP class (the R391 being an LMP), which would have granted them automatic entry to 2000 24 Hours of Le Mans had they continued the GT-One program.

The GT-One program would not be continued into 2000, Toyota instead turning TTE into the leaders of the new Toyota F1 team. This would mark the end of Toyota's attempts at Le Mans, which had started in 1985, until its return in 2012 with the TS030 Hybrid closed-cockpit LMP1 prototype in the FIA World Endurance Championship. With Mercedes-Benz pulling out and Audi discontinuing their LMGTP competitor, the Audi R8C, no LMGTP entrants appeared in the next year's race; only Bentley continued to compete in the class until it was abolished as a result of an LMP class restructuring in 2006.

== Sponsorship ==
Marlboro was the Toyota GT-One sponsor in 1999 (hence the white chevron with red body livery), though an anti-tobacco law in France meant that no Marlboro logos appeared anywhere on the car. In pictures of practice sessions, Marlboro barcodes across the front of the car (which also appeared on Ferrari Formula One cars during tobacco legislated races) were seen, although these barcodes did not appear on the final race car. The logos were also absent during the Fuji 1000 km race, which was held in Japan, a country with no tobacco sponsorship restrictions at the time.

Other sponsors included Zent (#1), Venture Safenet (#2) and Esso (#3 and Fuji 1000 km).

== Chassis ==
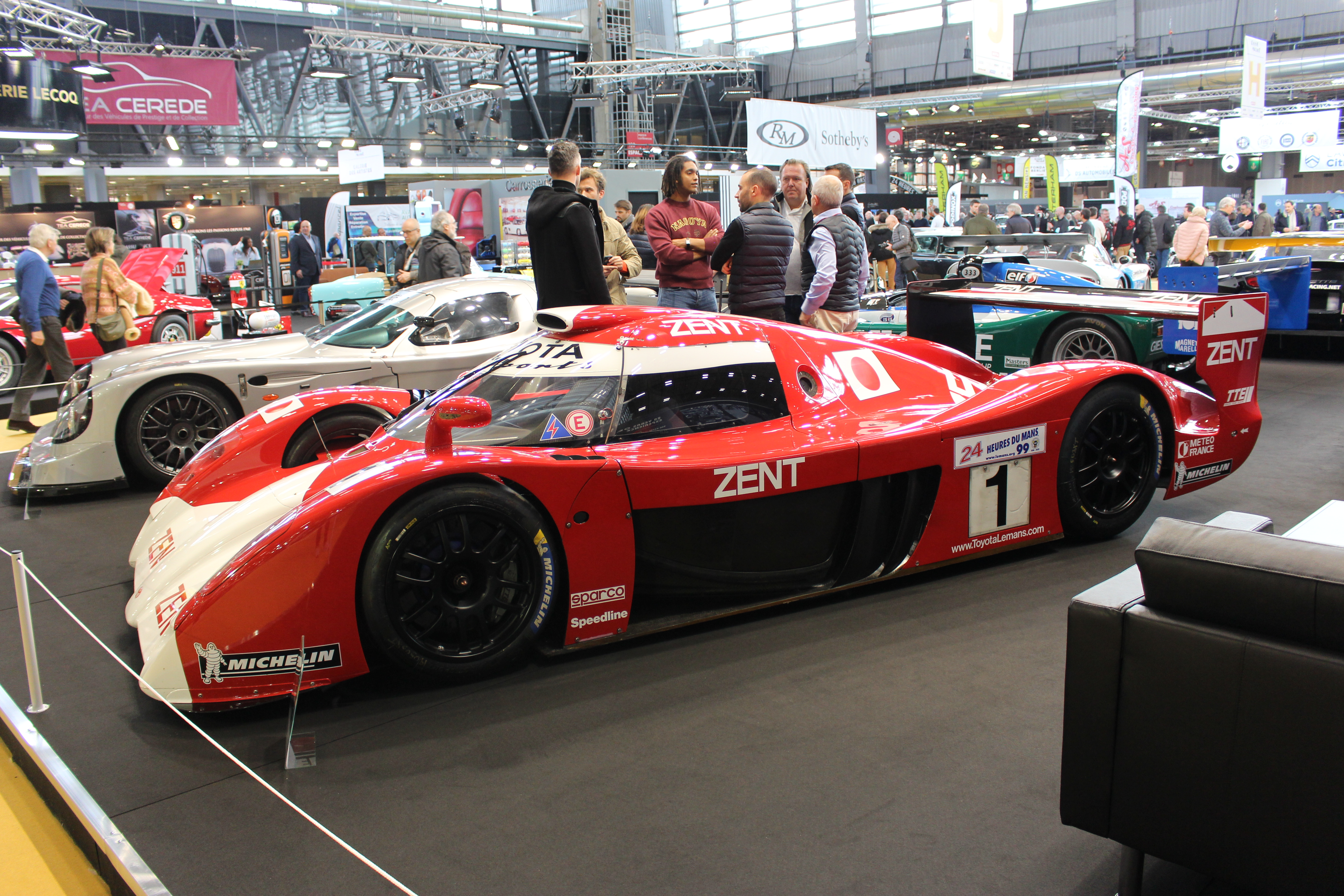
The only privately owned Toyota GT-One on display at Rétromobile 2023 in Paris

A total of seven GT-Ones were built over the two years of the program. The first six were built in 1998, while the final chassis was built in 1999.

- LM801 - Development prototype, never raced.
- LM802 - 1998 24 Hours of Le Mans #29, later a test car.
- LM803 - Road-legal version of the GT-One, on display in Europe. Licensed "K-LM-1998".
- LM804 - 1998 24 Hours of Le Mans #28, 1999 24 Hours of Le Mans #3, later on display in Japan.
- LM805 - 1998 24 Hours of Le Mans #27, later a test car.
- LM806 - 1999 24 Hours of Le Mans #2.
- LM907 - 1999 24 Hours of Le Mans #1.

LM804 was the only car to race in both 24 Hours of Le Mans. LM804 and LM805 were the only cars to finish the 24 Hours of Le Mans, the former as car #3 in 1999 and the latter as car #27 in 1998.

== 24 Hours of Le Mans results ==
Races in bold indicate pole position; races in italics indicate fastest lap.

Year	Entrant	#	Drivers	Class	Laps	Pos.	Class Pos.
1998	(Japan) Toyota Motorsports (Germany) Toyota Team Europe	27	(Japan) Ukyo Katayama (Japan) Toshio Suzuki (Japan) Keiichi Tsuchiya	GT1	326	9th	8th
1998	(Japan) Toyota Motorsports (Germany) Toyota Team Europe	28	(United Kingdom) Martin Brundle (France) Emmanuel Collard (France) Éric Hélary	GT1	191	Ret	Ret
1998	(Japan) Toyota Motorsports (Germany) Toyota Team Europe	29	(Belgium) Thierry Boutsen (Germany) Ralf Kelleners (United Kingdom) Geoff Lees	GT1	330	Ret	Ret
1999	(Japan) Toyota Motorsports (Germany) Toyota Team Europe	1	(United Kingdom) Martin Brundle (France) Emmanuel Collard (Italy) Vincenzo Sospiri	LMGTP	90	**Ret**	**Ret**
1999	(Japan) Toyota Motorsports (Germany) Toyota Team Europe	2	(Belgium) Thierry Boutsen (Germany) Ralf Kelleners (United Kingdom) Allan McNish	LMGTP	173	Ret	Ret
1999	(Japan) Toyota Motorsports (Germany) Toyota Team Europe	3	(Japan) Ukyo Katayama (Japan) Toshio Suzuki (Japan) Keiichi Tsuchiya	LMGTP	364	2nd	1st
