= SARD =

Japanese tuning company and racing team

SARD Corporation

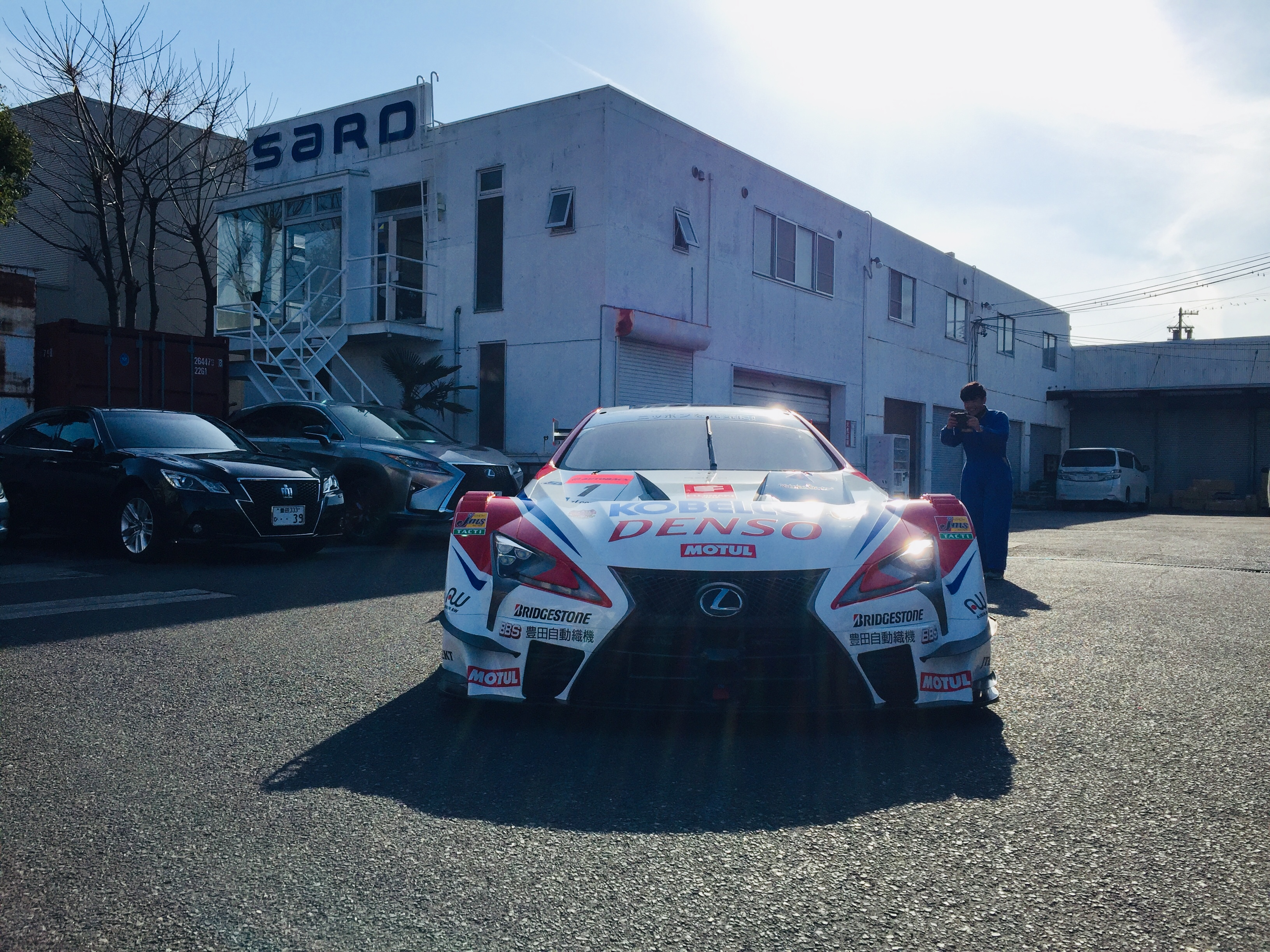
- SARD Headquarters in Toyota, Aichi
- Type: Limited
- Industry: Motorsport and car tuning
- Founded: 1985
- Headquarters: Higashimachi, Toyota, Aichi, Japan
- Key people: Shin Kato, President
- Products: Racing team, aftermarket tuning component
- Owner: Shin Kato
- Website: https://www.sard.co.jp

SARD Corporation (株式会社サード, Kabushiki gaisha Sādo; abbreviated as Sigma Advanced Racing Development) is a Japanese tuning company and racing team from Toyota, Aichi, mainly competing in the Super GT series and specializing in Toyota tuning parts.

== History ==
The company was formed in 1972 as Sigma Automotive Co., Ltd by Shin Kato to develop and produce motorsport related parts and accessories as well as operating their own racing team.

In 1985, the racing division of Sigma Automotive became an independent company, Kato established a company called Sigma Advanced Racing Development (SARD) specializing in motorsport as well as producing aftermarket parts for Toyota automobiles.

== Products ==
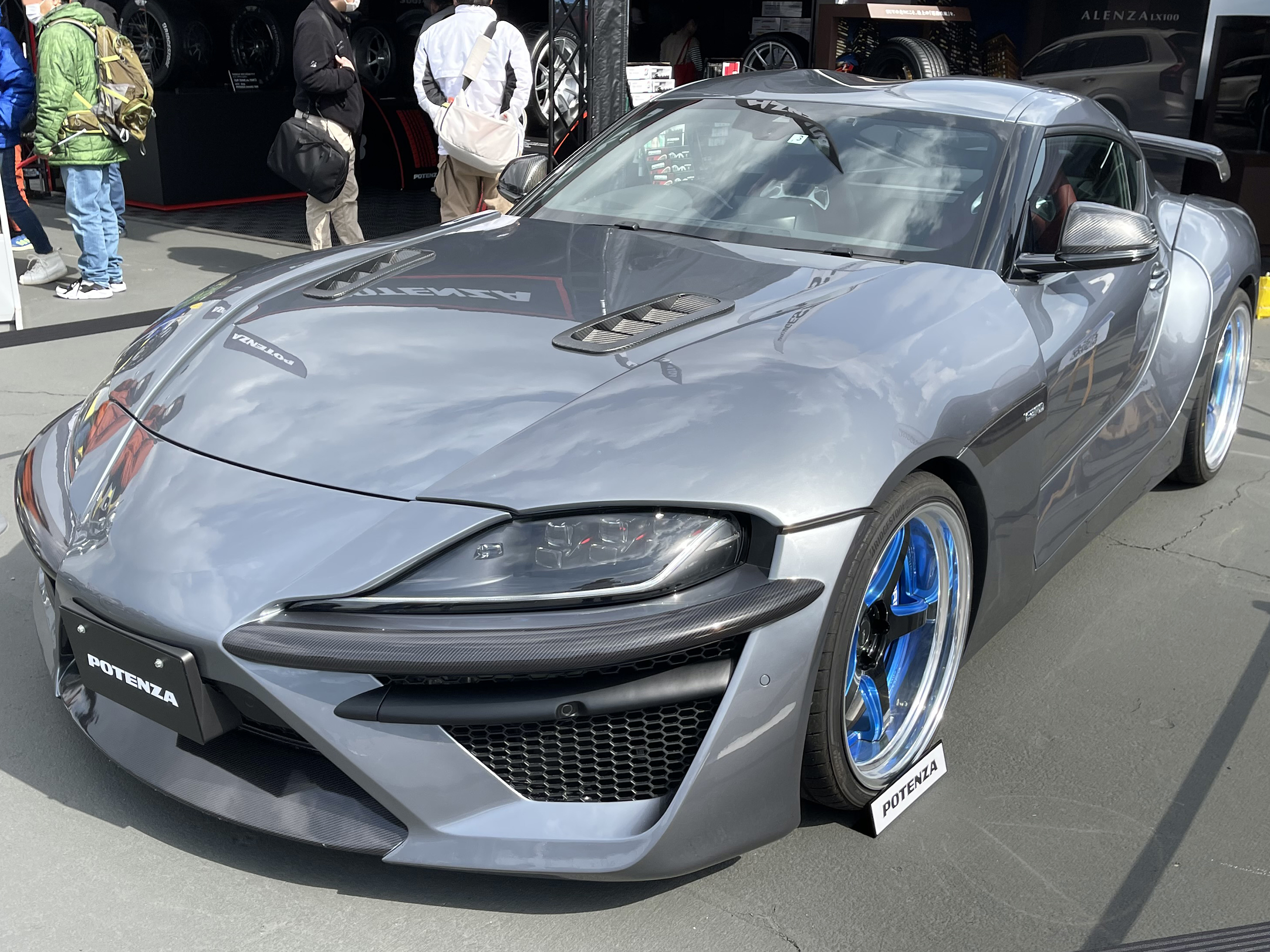
SARD Supra 90 Complete at Suzuka Fan Thanksgiving Day 2022

Sigma Advanced Racing Development (SARD) develops and manufactures tuning parts mainly for Toyota cars, namely turbochargers, redesigned fuel systems and cooling systems, suspension parts and aerodynamic kits. The company is not restricted to Toyotas as they are well known within the aftermarket tuning market for their fueling components used by numerous tuning companies.

=== Current Product Lines ===
- Complete Car
- Aero
- Wing
- Dry Carbon
- Interior
- Exhaust
- Intake & Suction
- Fuel
- Oil
- Chemical
- Cooling
- Footwork
- Body Build
- Powertrain
- Engine Parts
- Turbo
- Electronics
- Sub Parts
- Goods & Apparel

Also, under the SARD Marine Project, a separate project to its car works, it builds and sell its Toyota powered motorboats.

== Motorsport ==
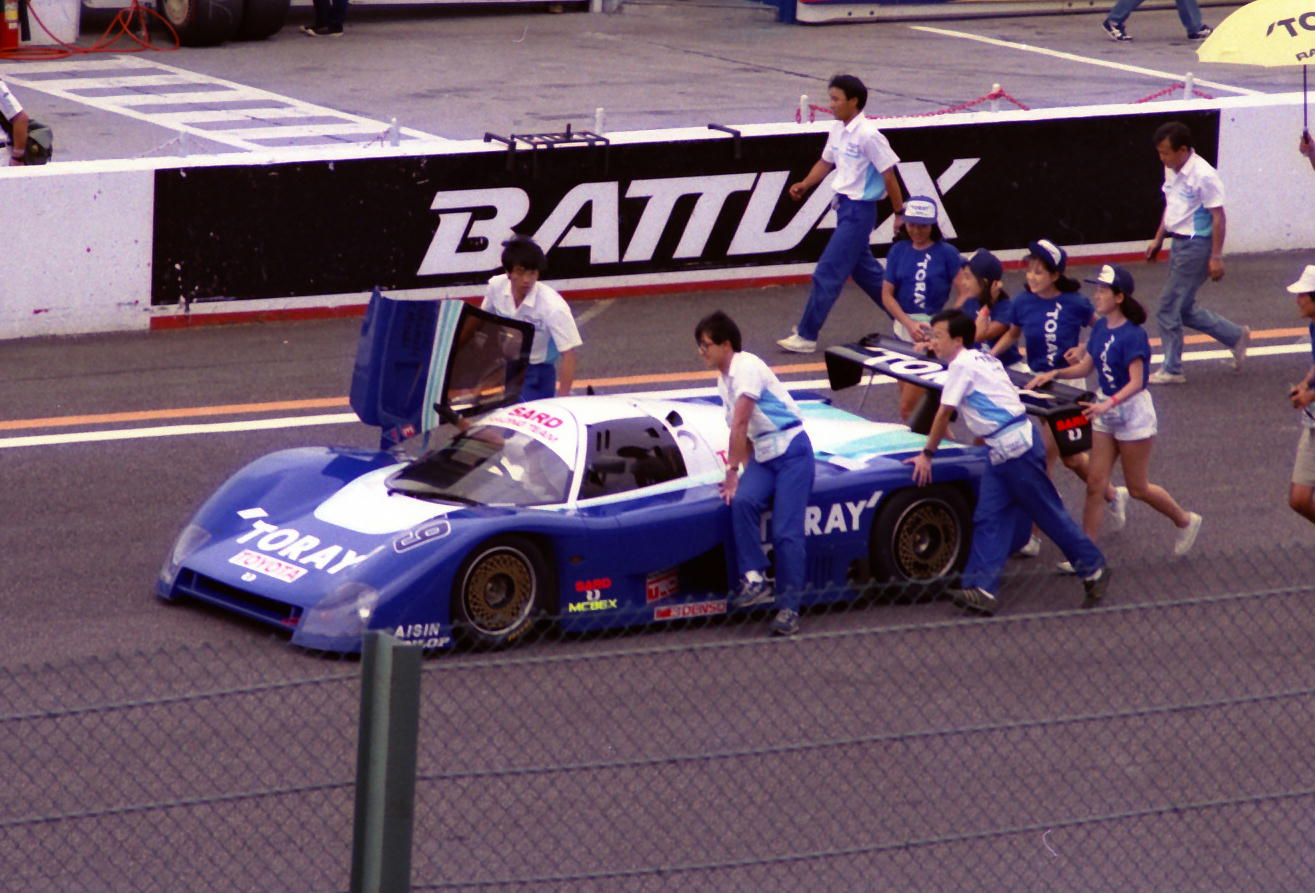
SARD MC86X Toyota of Sasaki / Okamoto / Misaki at the Suzuka 1000 Kilometres (1986 All Japan Endurance Championship, Round 4)

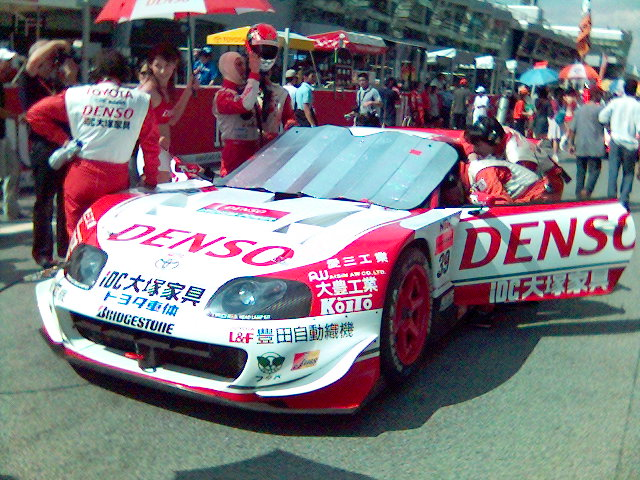
SARD Supra

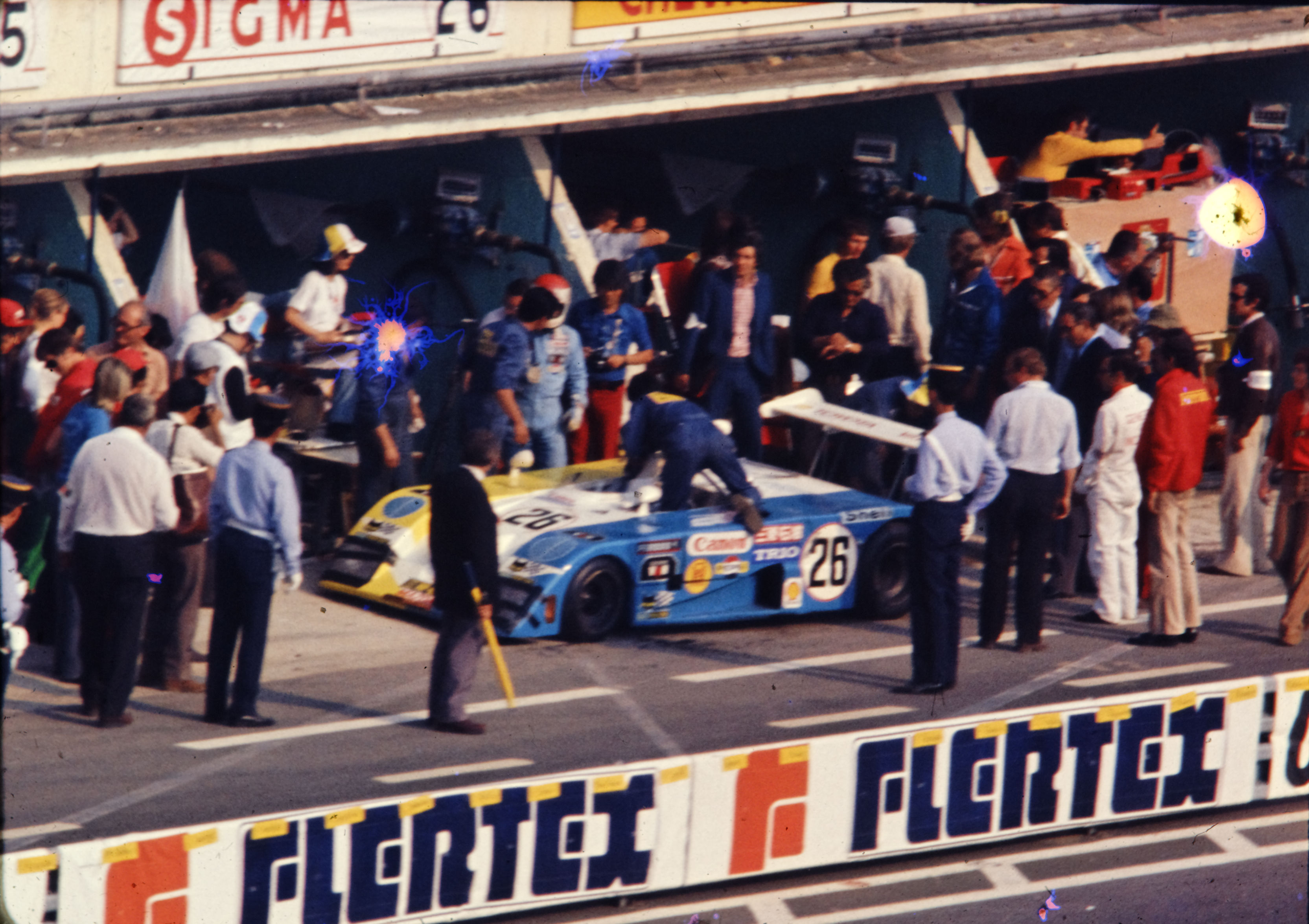
Mazda Sigma MC73 at the 1973 24 Hours of Le Mans

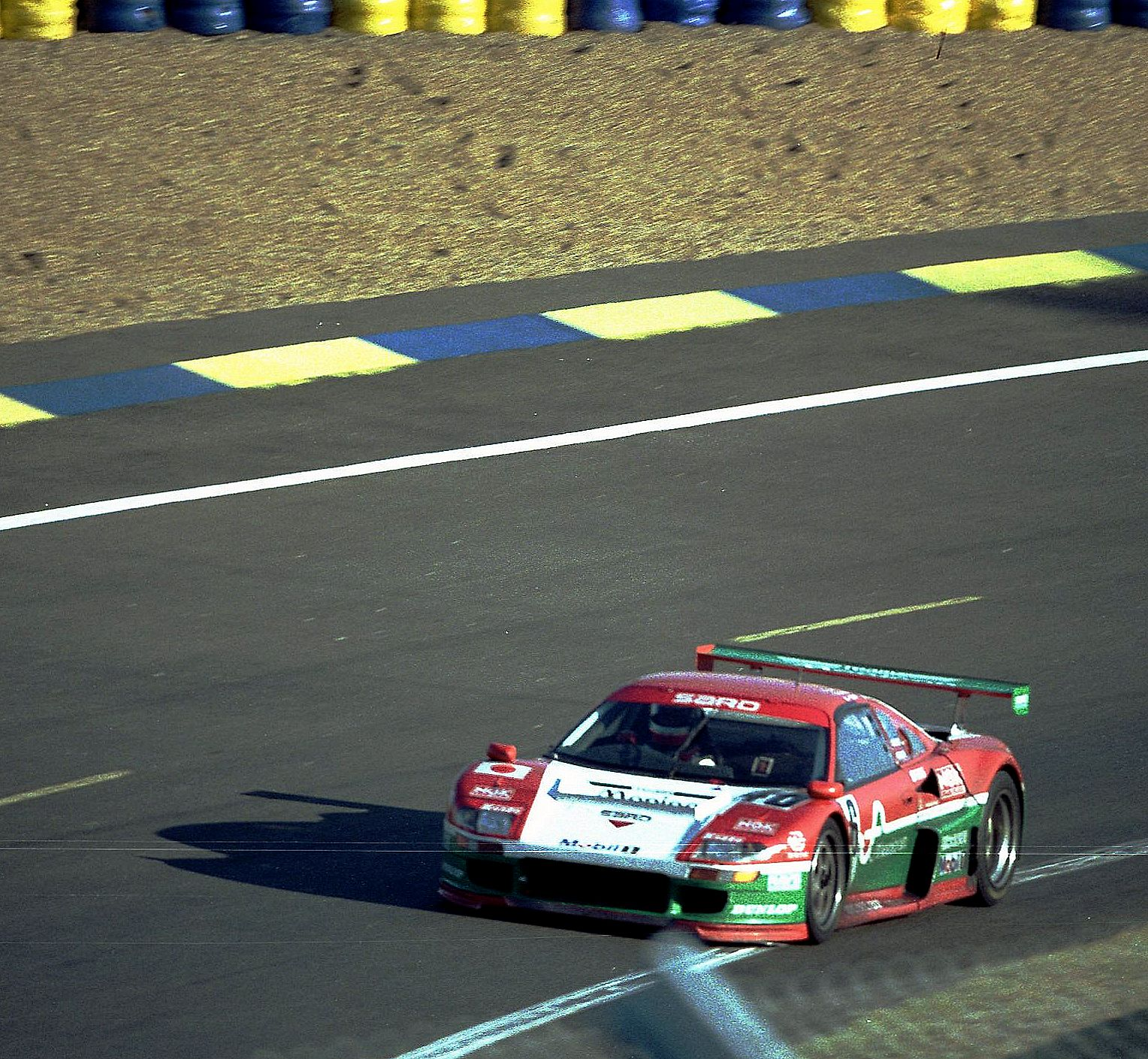
SARD MC8-R at the 1996 24 Hours of Le Mans

Sigma Automotive began its racing career in the Fuji Grand Champion Series and in 1973 participated for the first time in the 24 Hours of Le Mans with their Sigma MC73, powered by a Mazda Wankel engine, becoming the first Japanese car to qualify for Le Mans, before retiring early in the race with electrical problems. The team returned for the following year with a Mazda backed MC74, finishing but not making enough laps to be classified. In 1975 the team switched to a Toyota powerplant in the MC75, only to suffer from another early retirement. After transitioning out of international motorsports, Sigma Automotive would continue to compete in numerous domestic series.

SARD returned to international motorsports in 1989, debuting as a Toyota backed team named Toyota Team SARD in the first round of World Sports Prototype Championship held in Suzuka, using a Toyota 89C-V, also competing in the All Japan Sports Prototype Championship. With the demise of Group C in 1993, SARD switched to the newly formed JGTC series and also return to Le Mans with a V8 powered MR2 known as the MC8-R, having the same spell of misfortune as they had during the 1970s, competing in 1995 and 1996, only to fail to pre-qualify in the face of the newer generations of GT1 cars in the following year. SARD also entered a Toyota Supra in first two years of the MC8-R program where it faced against fellow Japanese GT machines in form of Nissan Skyline GT-R and Honda NSX, the latter which also raced in and won the GT2 class in 1995. The JGTC-specification Supra was entered in the 1995 24 Hours of Le Mans where it finished 14th, the team returned again in 1996 but did not finish.

SARD continued to compete in the JGTC and Super GT series with works-backed Toyotas and Lexuses; the team currently fields a Toyota GR Supra under the Toyota Team SARD name. In the 2016 Super GT Championship, SARD won its first-ever Super GT championship with a Lexus RC F driven by Heikki Kovalainen and Kohei Hirate.

In 2006, SARD competed in the 24 Hours of Tokachi, a Super Taikyu race, with a hybrid powered Lexus GS450h finishing 4th in class and 17th overall. For the following year, SARD took their Super GT specification Supra out of retirement, installed a hybrid version of its Super GT 3UZ-FE engine, giving out 480 bhp (358 kW) and 376 lb⋅ft (510 N⋅m) of torque. The Supra, rechristened as the Denso SARD Supra HV-R and driven by series regulars André Couto, Akira Iida, Katsuyuki Hiranaka and Tatsuya Kataoka started on pole and effortlessly dominated the entire race, completing 616 laps, 19 laps ahead of the runner-up. It became the first hybrid-powered car to win a race.

SARD planned to take part in the 2015 FIA World Endurance Championship season with a LMP2-class prototype in association with Morand Racing, with plans for a future LMP1 entry. However, SARD was forced to reduce its participation after a loss of backers before the season started; it was unable to come up with half of the season's budget, as agreed with Morand. Nevertheless, Morand continued to compete under the Team SARD Morand name during the 2015 season.

== Complete race Results ==
=== Complete JGTC Results ===
(key) (Races in bold indicate pole position) (Races in italics indicate fastest lap)

Year	Car	Tyres	Class	No.	Drivers	1	2	3	4	5	6	7	8	9	Pos	Pts
1994	Toyota Supra	M	GT1	39	(United States) Jeff Krosnoff	FUJ	SEN	FUJ	SUG; Ret	**MIN**; 10					NC	1
1995	Toyota Supra	D	GT1	39	(United States) Jeff Krosnoff	SUZ; 3	FUJ; 12	SEN; 5	FUJ; 16	**SUG**; 3	MIN; 11				6th	32
1996	Toyota Supra	D	GT500	39	(Australia) Wayne Gardner (France) Alain Ferté (Japan) Naoki Nagasaka (Italy) Giampiero Simoni (France) Olivier Grouillard (France) David Dussau	SUZ; 17	FUJ; 3	SEN; 4	FUJ; 9	SUG; 7	MIN; 8	NC1; 7			6th	31
1997	Toyota Supra	Y	GT500	39	(Japan) Masami Kageyama (Japan) Tatsuya Tanigawa (France) Olivier Grouillard	SUZ; 2	FUJ; 1	SEN; 5	FUJ; 1	MIN; 13	SUG; 7	NC1; Ret	NC2; Ret		2nd	67
1998	Toyota Supra	Y	GT500	39	(Japan) Keiichi Tsuchiya (Japan) Tatsuya Tanigawa	SUZ; 3	FUJ; C	SEN; 4	FUJ; 9	MOT; Ret	MIN; 3	SUG; Ret	NC1; 3		7th	36
1999	Toyota Supra	Y	GT500	39	(Japan) Keiichi Tsuchiya (Japan) Masahiko Kageyama	SUZ; 16	FUJ; 15	SUG; Ret	MIN; 7	FUJ; 10	OKA; 13	MOT; Ret	NC1; 13		12th	5
2000	Toyota Supra	Y	GT500	39	(Japan) Masahiko Kageyama (Republic of Ireland) Ralph Firman	MOT; 10	FUJ; Ret	SUG; 6	NC1; 13	FUJ; 2	OKA; Ret	MIN; 8	SUZ; 16		7th	25
2001	Toyota Supra	Y	GT500	39	(France) Jérémie Dufour (Japan) Masahiko Kageyama (France) Romain Dumas	OKA; 7	FUJ; 7	SUG; 9	NC1	FUJ; 13	MOT; Ret	SUZ; 9	MIN; 4		11th	22
2002	Toyota Supra	Y	GT500	39	(France) Jérémie Dufour (Japan) Manabu Orido	OKA; 3	FUJ; Ret	SUG; 12	SEP; DSQ	FUJ; 15	MOT; 5	MIN; 7	SUZ; 5		9th	33
2003	Toyota Supra	Y	GT500	39	(Japan) Manabu Orido (Germany) Dominik Schwager	OKA; 14	FUJ; 3	SUG; 14	FUJ; 3	FUJ; 7	MOT; 7	AUT; 1	SUZ; 9		6th	57
2004	Toyota Supra	B	GT500	39	(France) Jérémie Dufour (Portugal) André Couto	OKA; 3	SUG; NC	SEP; 1	TOK; 7	MOT; 6	AUT; 2	SUZ; 8	NC1	NC2	2nd	61

=== Complete Super GT Results ===
(key) (Races in bold indicate pole position) (Races in italics indicate fastest lap)

Year	Car	Tyres	Class	No.	Drivers	1	2	3	4	5	6	7	8	9	10	Pos	Points
2005	Toyota Supra	B	GT500	39	(Portugal) André Couto (Italy) Ronnie Quintarelli	OKA; 8	FUJ; Ret	SEP; 9	SUG; 2	MOT; 14	FUJ; 12	AUT; 11	SUZ; 11			12th	21
2006	Toyota Supra	B	GT500	66	(Portugal) André Couto (Japan) Katsuyuki Hiranaka (France) Soheil Ayari	SUZ; 11	OKA; 13	FUJ; 11	SEP; 13	SUG; Ret	SUZ; 11	MOT; 9	AUT; 10	FUJ; 10		15th	9
2007	Lexus SC430	B	GT500	39	(Portugal) André Couto (Japan) Katsuyuki Hiranaka	SUZ; Ret	OKA; 12	FUJ; 8	SEP; 13	SUG; 6	SUZ; 11	MOT; 10	AUT; 3	FUJ; 13		15th	37
2008	Lexus SC430	D	GT500	39	(Portugal) André Couto (Japan) Toranosuke Takagi (Japan) Koki Saga	SUZ; 12	OKA; 14	FUJ; 13	SEP; 12	SUG; 6	SUZ; 15	MOT; 13	AUT; 13	FUJ; 5		16th	29
2009	Lexus SC430	D	GT500	39	(Portugal) André Couto (Japan) Kohei Hirate	OKA; 15	SUZ; 10	FUJ; 10	SEP; 13	SUG; 2	SUZ; 7	FUJ; 11	AUT; 12	MOT; 5		13th	48
2010	Lexus SC430	D	GT500	39	(Portugal) André Couto (Japan) Kohei Hirate (Netherlands) Carlo van Dam	SUZ; 5	OKA; 10	FUJ; Ret	SEP; 10	SUG; 10	SUZ; 8	FUJ; C	MOT; 11	NC1; 10	NC2; 8	12th	26
2011	Lexus SC430	M	GT500	39	(Japan) Hiroaki Ishiura (Japan) Takuto Iguchi	OKA; 13	**FUJ**; 6	SEP; 13	SUG; 2	SUZ; 5	**FUJ**; 8	**AUT**; 15	MOT; 3	NC1; 9	NC2; 8	7th	61
2012	Lexus SC430	M	GT500	39	(Japan) Hiroaki Ishiura (Japan) Juichi Wakisaka	OKA; 9	FUJ; 1	SEP; 4	SUG; 4	SUZ; Ret	FUJ; 6	AUT; 5	MOT; 5	NC1; 11	NC2; 8	3rd	78
2013	Lexus SC430	B	GT500	39	(Japan) Hiroaki Ishiura (Japan) Juichi Wakisaka	OKA; 8	FUJ; 4	SEP; 2	SUG; 4	SUZ; 9	FUJ; 11	AUT; 7	MOT; 4	NC1; 9	NC2; 7	7th	70
2014	Lexus RC F	B	GT500	39	(Japan) Hiroaki Ishiura (United Kingdom) Oliver Jarvis	OKA; 4	FUJ; 6	AUT; 11	SUG; 6	FUJ; 12	SUZ; 11	BUR; 7	MOT; 9			10th	43
2015	Lexus RC F	B	GT500	39	(Finland) Heikki Kovalainen (Japan) Kohei Hirate (Austria) Christian Klien	OKA; 5	FUJ; 5	CHA; 7	FUJ; 9	SUZ; 11	SUG; Ret	AUT; 13	MOT; 6			13th	40
2016	Audi R8 LMS	Y	GT300	26	(Japan) Shogo Mitsuyama (Japan) Yuya Motojima (Japan) Tsubasa Kondo	OKA; 20	FUJ; 15	SUG; 19	FUJ; 8	SUZ; 20	CHA	MOT; 6	MOT; 7			16th	27
2016	Lexus RC F	B	GT500	39	(Finland) Heikki Kovalainen (Japan) Kohei Hirate	OKA; 7	FUJ; 2	SUG; 2	FUJ; 8	SUZ; 8	CHA; 7	**MOT**; 2	**MOT**; 1			1st	103
2017	Lexus LC500 GT500	B	GT500	1	(Finland) Heikki Kovalainen (Japan) Kohei Hirate	OKA; 3	FUJ; 7	AUT; 14	SUG; 1	FUJ; 10	SUZ; 13	CHA; 6	MOT; 8			6th	64
2017	Audi R8 LMS	Y	GT300	26	(Japan) Shinnosuke Yamada (Australia) Jake Parsons (Austria) Christian Klien	OKA; 21	FUJ; 21	AUT; 14	SUG; 18	FUJ; 19	SUZ; Ret	CHA; 19	MOT; 14			24th	11
2018	Lexus LC500 GT500	B	GT500	39	(Finland) Heikki Kovalainen (Japan) Kamui Kobayashi (Japan) Sho Tsuboi	OKA; 12	FUJ; 2	SUZ; Ret	CHA; 1	FUJ; 11	SUG; 10	AUT; 8	MOT; 8			9th	62
2019	Lexus LC500 GT500	B	GT500	39	(Finland) Heikki Kovalainen (Japan) Yuichi Nakayama	OKA; 11	FUJ; 4	SUZ; 5	BUR; 5	FUJ; Ret	AUT; 1	SUG; 7	MOT; 11	NC1; 16	NC2; 14	5th	64
2020	Toyota GR Supra GT500	B	GT500	39	(Japan) Yuichi Nakayama (Finland) Heikki Kovalainen (Japan) Kenta Yamashita (Japan) Sena Sakaguchi	FUJ; 5	FUJ; 6	SUZ; 5	MOT; 9	FUJ; 1	SUZ; 11	MOT; 8	FUJ; 14			8th	64
2021	Toyota GR Supra GT500	B	GT500	39	(Finland) Heikki Kovalainen (Japan) Yuichi Nakayama	OKA; 4	FUJ; 6	MOT; 10	SUZ; 14	SUG; 5	AUT; 5	MOT; 11	FUJ; 4			9th	58
2022	Toyota GR Supra GT500	B	GT500	39	(Japan) Yuichi Nakayama (Japan) Yuhi Sekiguchi	OKA; 8	FUJ; 13	SUZ; 4	FUJ; 6	SUZ; 3	SUG; 6	AUT; 10	MOT; Ret			8th	51.5
2023	Toyota GR Supra GT500	B	GT500	39	(Japan) Yuichi Nakayama (Japan) Yuhi Sekiguchi	OKA; 8	FUJ; 8	SUZ; 15	FUJ; 9	SUZ; 2	SUG; 3	AUT; 14	MOT; 7			8th	58
2024	Toyota GR Supra GT500	B	GT500	39	(Japan) Yuichi Nakayama (Japan) Yuhi Sekiguchi	OKA; 2	FUJ; 9	SUZ; 11	FUJ; 15	SUG; 11	AUT; 1	MOT; 5	SUZ; 10			7th	64
2025	Toyota GR Supra GT500	B	GT500	39	(Japan) Yuhi Sekiguchi (Argentina) Sacha Fenestraz	OKA; 3	FUJ; 5	SEP; 14	FS1; 5	FS2; 4	SUZ; 6	SUG; 2	AUT; 12	MOT; 4		3rd	76

^{‡} Half points awarded as less than 75% of race distance was completed. * Season still in progress.

=== 24 Hours of Le Mans results ===
Year	Entrant	No.	Tyres	Car	Drivers	Class	Laps	Pos.	Class Pos.
1973	(Japan) Sigma Automotive Co.	26	B	Sigma MC73	(Japan) Tetsu Ikuzawa (Japan) Hiroshi Fushida (France) Patrick Dal Bo	S 2.5	79	DNF	DNF
1974	(Japan) Mazda Automotive	25	D	Sigma MC74	(Japan) Harukuni Takahashi (Japan) Yasuhiro Okamoto (Japan) Yojiro Terada	S 3.0	156	NC	NC
1975	(Japan) Sigma Automotive Co.	18	D	Sigma MC75	(Japan) Harukuni Takahashi (Japan) Hiroshi Fushida	S 3.0	37	DNF	DNF
1990	(Japan) Toyota Team SARD	38	D	Toyota 90C-V	(Austria) Roland Ratzenberger (France) Pierre-Henri Raphanel (Japan) Naoki Nagasaka	C1	241	DNF	DNF
1992	(Japan) KITZ Racing Team with SARD	34	B	Toyota 92C-V	(Austria) Roland Ratzenberger (United Kingdom) Eddie Irvine (Sweden) Eje Elgh	C2	321	9th	2nd
1993	(Japan) SARD Co. Ltd.	22	D	Toyota 93C-V	(Austria) Roland Ratzenberger (Italy) Mauro Martini (Japan) Naoki Nagasaka	C2	363	1st	5th
1994	(Japan) SARD Company Ltd.	1	D	Toyota 94C-V	(Italy) Mauro Martini (United States) Jeff Krosnoff (United Kingdom) Eddie Irvine	LMP1/ C90	343	1st	2nd
1995	(Japan) SARD Co. Ltd.	26	D	SARD MC8-R	(France) Alain Ferté (United Kingdom) Kenny Acheson (Japan) Tomiko Yoshikawa	GT1	14	DNF	DNF
1995	(Japan) SARD Co. Ltd.	27	D	Toyota Supra GT-LM	(United States) Jeff Krosnoff (Italy) Marco Apicella (Italy) Mauro Martini	GT1	264	14th	7th
1996	(Japan) Team Menicon SARD	46	D	SARD MC8-R	(France) Alain Ferté (France) Pascal Fabre (Italy) Mauro Martini	LM-GT1	256	24th	15th
1996	(Japan) Toyota Team SARD	57	D	Toyota Supra LM	(Japan) Masanori Sekiya (Japan) Masami Kageyama (Japan) Hidetoshi Mitsusada	LM-GT1	205	DNF	DNF
1997	(Japan) Team Menicon SARD	34	Y	SARD MC8-R	(France) Olivier Grouillard (France) Christophe Tinseau	GT1	0	DNQ	DNQ
1997	(Japan) Team Menicon SARD	35	M	SARD MC8-R	(Spain) Oriol Servia (France) Cathy Muller (France) Alexandre Debanne	GT1	0	DNQ	DNQ
2015	(Switzerland) Team SARD Morand	43	D	Morgan LMP2 Evo	(France) Pierre Ragues (United Kingdom) Oliver Webb (Switzerland) Zoël Amberg	LMP2	162	DNF	DNF
