= 1996 BPR 4 Hours of Zhuhai =

Layout of the Zhuhai International Circuit

The 1996 BPR 4 Hours of Zhuhai was the eleventh and final round of the 1996 BPR Global GT Series season. It was run at the Zhuhai International Circuit on 3 November 1996.

== Official results ==
Class winners in bold. Cars failing to complete 75% of winner's distance marked as Not Classified (NC).

Pos	Class	No	Team	Drivers	Chassis	Tyre	Laps
Pos	Class	No	Team	Drivers	Engine	Tyre	Laps
1	**GT1**	**36**	**(Germany) Porsche AG**	**(France) Emmanuel Collard** **(Germany) Ralf Kelleners**	**Porsche 911 GT1**	**MI**	**149**
1	**GT1**	**36**	**(Germany) Porsche AG**	**(France) Emmanuel Collard** **(Germany) Ralf Kelleners**	**Porsche 3.2 L Turbo Flat-6**	**MI**	**149**
2	GT1	28	(Italy) Ennea Igol	(France) Jean-Marc Gounon (France) Éric Bernard (France) Paul Belmondo	Ferrari F40 GTE	**P**	147
2	GT1	28	(Italy) Ennea Igol	(France) Jean-Marc Gounon (France) Éric Bernard (France) Paul Belmondo	Ferrari F120B 3.5L Turbo V8	**P**	147
3	GT1	2	(United Kingdom) Marlboro McLaren Team GTC	(United Kingdom) James Weaver (United Kingdom) Ray Bellm (Finland) JJ Lehto	McLaren F1 GTR	**MI**	147
3	GT1	2	(United Kingdom) Marlboro McLaren Team GTC	(United Kingdom) James Weaver (United Kingdom) Ray Bellm (Finland) JJ Lehto	BMW S70 6.1L V12	**MI**	147
4	GT1	6	(United Kingdom) Marlboro McLaren Team GTC	(France) Pierre-Henri Raphanel (Australia) David Brabham	McLaren F1 GTR	**MI**	147
4	GT1	6	(United Kingdom) Marlboro McLaren Team GTC	(France) Pierre-Henri Raphanel (Australia) David Brabham	BMW S70 6.1L V12	**MI**	147
5	GT1	35	(Germany) Porsche AG	(France) Bob Wollek (France) Yannick Dalmas	Porsche 911 GT1	**MI**	147
5	GT1	35	(Germany) Porsche AG	(France) Bob Wollek (France) Yannick Dalmas	Porsche 3.2 L Turbo Flat-6	**MI**	147
6	GT1	1	(United Kingdom) West Competition (United Kingdom) David Price Racing	(Denmark) John Nielsen (Germany) Thomas Bscher	McLaren F1 GTR	**MI**	146
6	GT1	1	(United Kingdom) West Competition (United Kingdom) David Price Racing	(Denmark) John Nielsen (Germany) Thomas Bscher	BMW S70 6.1L V12	**MI**	146
7	GT1	9	(France) Franck Muller Watch	(France) Fabien Giroix (Switzerland) Jean-Denis Délétraz (Thailand) Ratanakul Prutirat	McLaren F1 GTR	**MI**	144
7	GT1	9	(France) Franck Muller Watch	(France) Fabien Giroix (Switzerland) Jean-Denis Délétraz (Thailand) Ratanakul Prutirat	BMW S70 6.1L V12	**MI**	144
8	GT1	27	(Italy) Ennea Igol	(Sweden) Anders Olofsson (Italy) Luciano della Noce (Italy) Max Angelelli	Ferrari F40 GTE	**P**	143
8	GT1	27	(Italy) Ennea Igol	(Sweden) Anders Olofsson (Italy) Luciano della Noce (Italy) Max Angelelli	Ferrari F120B 3.5L Turbo V8	**P**	143
9	**GT2**	**83**	**(Netherlands) Marcos Racing International**	**(Netherlands) Cor Euser** **(Netherlands) Hans Tepas** **(Indonesia) Chandra Alim**	**Marcos LM600**	**D**	**139**
9	**GT2**	**83**	**(Netherlands) Marcos Racing International**	**(Netherlands) Cor Euser** **(Netherlands) Hans Tepas** **(Indonesia) Chandra Alim**	**Chevrolet 6.0L V8**	**D**	**139**
10	GT2	106	(Germany) Roock Racing	(United States) Andy Pilgrim (Germany) Claudia Hürtgen (France) Michel Ligonnet	Porsche 911 GT2	**MI**	138
10	GT2	106	(Germany) Roock Racing	(United States) Andy Pilgrim (Germany) Claudia Hürtgen (France) Michel Ligonnet	Porsche 3.6L Turbo Flat-6	**MI**	138
11	GT2	55	(Switzerland) Stadler Motorsport	(Switzerland) Lilian Bryner (Switzerland) Enzo Calderari (Germany) Ulli Richter	Porsche 911 GT2	**P**	138
11	GT2	55	(Switzerland) Stadler Motorsport	(Switzerland) Lilian Bryner (Switzerland) Enzo Calderari (Germany) Ulli Richter	Porsche 3.6L Turbo Flat-6	**P**	138
12	GT2	65	(Germany) Roock Racing	(France) Jean-Marc Smadja (France) Guy Martinolle (France) Jean-Claude Lagniez	Porsche 911 GT2	**MI**	137
12	GT2	65	(Germany) Roock Racing	(France) Jean-Marc Smadja (France) Guy Martinolle (France) Jean-Claude Lagniez	Porsche 3.6L Turbo Flat-6	**MI**	137
13	GT2	96	(France) Larbre Compétition	(France) Patrice Goueslard (Germany) André Ahrlé	Porsche 911 GT2	**MI**	136
13	GT2	96	(France) Larbre Compétition	(France) Patrice Goueslard (Germany) André Ahrlé	Porsche 3.6 L Turbo Flat-6	**MI**	136
14	GT1	5	(France) Graham	(France) Éric Graham (France) Michel Faraut	Venturi 600LM	**D**	132
14	GT1	5	(France) Graham	(France) Éric Graham (France) Michel Faraut	Renault PRV 3.0 L Turbo V6	**D**	132
15	GT1	16	(Austria) Karl Augustin	(Austria) Karl Augustin (Germany) Ernst Gschwender (Austria) Horst Felbermayr	Porsche 911 Carrera Cup	**P**	131
15	GT1	16	(Austria) Karl Augustin	(Austria) Karl Augustin (Germany) Ernst Gschwender (Austria) Horst Felbermayr	Porsche 3.6L Turbo Flat-6	**P**	131
16	GT2	50	(Switzerland) Stadler Motorsport	(Switzerland) Uwe Sick (Italy) Renato Mastropietro (Italy) Ruggero Grassi	Porsche 911 GT2	**P**	130
16	GT2	50	(Switzerland) Stadler Motorsport	(Switzerland) Uwe Sick (Italy) Renato Mastropietro (Italy) Ruggero Grassi	Porsche 3.6L Turbo Flat-6	**P**	130
17	GT2	56	(Germany) Roock Racing	(Germany) Gerd Ruch (Switzerland) Bruno Eichmann (Monaco) Stéphane Ortelli	Porsche 911 GT2	**MI**	123
17	GT2	56	(Germany) Roock Racing	(Germany) Gerd Ruch (Switzerland) Bruno Eichmann (Monaco) Stéphane Ortelli	Porsche 3.6L Turbo Flat-6	**MI**	123
18	GT2	109	(China) Dentro Team Megaspeed	(Hong Kong) Alex Li (United Kingdom) Brian Whillock (United Kingdom) Michael Pickup	Porsche 911 Carrera RS	?	121
18	GT2	109	(China) Dentro Team Megaspeed	(Hong Kong) Alex Li (United Kingdom) Brian Whillock (United Kingdom) Michael Pickup	Porsche 3.8 L Flat-6	?	121
19	GT2	112	(Hong Kong) Samson Chan	(Hong Kong) Samson Chan (Hong Kong) Keith Wong (United Kingdom) Eric Chan	Porsche 911 Carrera RS	?	118
19	GT2	112	(Hong Kong) Samson Chan	(Hong Kong) Samson Chan (Hong Kong) Keith Wong (United Kingdom) Eric Chan	Porsche 3.8 L Flat-6	?	118
20	GT2	113	(United Kingdom) Corona Team	(Sweden) Tony Ring (Germany) Peter Worm (United Kingdom) Ian Ross Geekie	Ferrari F355 Challenge	?	113
20	GT2	113	(United Kingdom) Corona Team	(Sweden) Tony Ring (Germany) Peter Worm (United Kingdom) Ian Ross Geekie	Ferrari F129B 3.5 L V8	?	113
21 DNF	GT1	11	(Germany) Konrad Motorsport	(Czech Republic) Karel Dolejší (France) Henri Pescarolo (Australia) Mark Williamson	Porsche 911 GT2 Evo	**MI**	91
21 DNF	GT1	11	(Germany) Konrad Motorsport	(Czech Republic) Karel Dolejší (France) Henri Pescarolo (Australia) Mark Williamson	Porsche 3.6 L Turbo Flat-6	**MI**	91
22 DNF	GT2	99	(Switzerland) Elf Haberthur Racing	(France) Ferdinand de Lesseps (France) Philippe Charriol (Singapore) Georges Ong	Porsche 911 GT2	**P**	85
22 DNF	GT2	99	(Switzerland) Elf Haberthur Racing	(France) Ferdinand de Lesseps (France) Philippe Charriol (Singapore) Georges Ong	Porsche 3.6L Turbo Flat-6	**P**	85
23 DNF	GT2	57	(Germany) Freisinger Motorsport	(Japan) Yukihiro Hane (France) Emmanuel Clérico	Porsche 911 GT2 Evo	**G**	73
23 DNF	GT2	57	(Germany) Freisinger Motorsport	(Japan) Yukihiro Hane (France) Emmanuel Clérico	Porsche 3.6 L Turbo Flat-6	**G**	73
24 DNF	GT2	51	(Germany) Proton Competition	(Germany) Gerold Ried (France) Patrick Vuillaume	Porsche 911 GT2	**P**	52
24 DNF	GT2	51	(Germany) Proton Competition	(Germany) Gerold Ried (France) Patrick Vuillaume	Porsche 3.6L Turbo Flat-6	**P**	52
25 DNF	GT1	49	(Germany) Freisinger Motorsport	(Germany) Wolfgang Kaufmann (France) Jean-Pierre Jarier	Porsche 911 GT2 Evo	**G**	44
25 DNF	GT1	49	(Germany) Freisinger Motorsport	(Germany) Wolfgang Kaufmann (France) Jean-Pierre Jarier	Porsche 3.6 L Turbo Flat-6	**G**	44
26 DNF	GT2	95	(France) European Luigi Racing	(Portugal) Manuel Monteiro (France) Michel Arnaud (Ethiopia) Mohammed Al Sakkaf	Dodge Viper RT/10	**D**	38
26 DNF	GT2	95	(France) European Luigi Racing	(Portugal) Manuel Monteiro (France) Michel Arnaud (Ethiopia) Mohammed Al Sakkaf	Dodge 8.0 L V10	**D**	38
27 DNF	GT2	88	(Austria) Konrad Motorsport	(Germany) Wido Rössler (Austria) Franz Konrad (Sweden) Carl Rosenblad	Porsche 911 GT2	**MI**	30
27 DNF	GT2	88	(Austria) Konrad Motorsport	(Germany) Wido Rössler (Austria) Franz Konrad (Sweden) Carl Rosenblad	Porsche 3.6 L Turbo Flat-6	**MI**	30
28 DNF	GT2	89	(United Kingdom) Team Marcos	(United Kingdom) Robert Schirle (United Kingdom) Phil Andrews (United Kingdom) Adam Topping	Marcos LM600	**D**	18
28 DNF	GT2	89	(United Kingdom) Team Marcos	(United Kingdom) Robert Schirle (United Kingdom) Phil Andrews (United Kingdom) Adam Topping	Chevrolet 6.1 L V8	**D**	18
DNS	GT2	108	(China) Dentro Team Megaspeed	(Hong Kong) Philip Ma (South Africa) Mark Goddard	Porsche 911 GT2	?	0
DNS	GT2	108	(China) Dentro Team Megaspeed	(Hong Kong) Philip Ma (South Africa) Mark Goddard	Porsche 3.6 L Turbo Flat-6	?	0

== Statistics ==
- Pole Position - #36 Porsche AG - 1:30.401
- Fastest Lap - (France) Yannick Dalmas (#35 Porsche AG) - 1:31.749

BPR Global GT Series
Previous race: Nogaro	1996 season	Next race: none
