= 1996 BPR Global GT Series =

Sports car racing season

Seasons
- ← 1995 1997 (FIA GT) →

The 1996 BPR International Endurance GT Series was the third and final season of BPR Global GT Series. It is a series for Grand Touring style cars broken into two classes based on power and manufacturer involvement, called GT1 and GT2. It began on 3 March 1996 and ended 3 November 1996 after 11 races. After the end of the season, two promotional races were held in Brazil, in the circuits of Curitiba (8 December 1996) and Brasília (16 December 1996).

This was the final season of the BPR series before it came under the control of the FIA to become the FIA GT Championship in 1997. This was also the first year that the classes of competitors were trimmed to just GT1 and GT2.

== Schedule ==
1996 BPR Kärcher Global Endurance GT Series Calendar
Rnd	Race	Circuit	Date
1	(France) 4 Hours of Le Castellet	Circuit Paul Ricard	3 March
2	(Italy) 4 Hour GT of Monza	Autodromo Nazionale Monza	24 March
3	(Spain) 4 Hours of Jarama	Circuito Permanente Del Jarama	14 April
4	(United Kingdom) 4 Hours of Silverstone (British Empire Trophy)	Silverstone Circuit	12 May
5	(Germany) 4 Hours of Nürburgring	Nürburgring	30 June
6	(Sweden) 4 Hours of Anderstorp	Scandinavian Raceway	14 July
7	(Japan) The Pokka International Suzuka 1000km	Suzuka Circuit	25 August
8	(United Kingdom) Gulf Oil Global GT Endurance (4 Hours)	Brands Hatch	8 September
9	(Belgium) 4 Hours of Spa	Circuit de Spa-Francorchamps	22 September
10	(France) 4 Hours of Nogaro	Circuit Paul Armagnac	6 October
11	(China) 4 Hours of Zhuhai	Zhuhai International Circuit	3 November

== Entries ==
=== GT1 ===
Entrant	Car	Engine	Tyre	No.	Drivers	Rounds
(United Kingdom) West Competition	McLaren F1 GTR	BMW S70/2 6.1 L V12	G	1	(Germany) Thomas Bscher	All
(United Kingdom) West Competition	McLaren F1 GTR	BMW S70/2 6.1 L V12	G	1	(Denmark) John Nielsen	1–4, 6–9, 11
(United Kingdom) West Competition	McLaren F1 GTR	BMW S70/2 6.1 L V12	G	1	(Netherlands) Peter Kox	5, 10
(United Kingdom) Harrods Mach One Racing	McLaren F1 GTR	BMW S70/2 6.1 L V12	G	3	(France) Olivier Grouillard	1–8
(United Kingdom) Harrods Mach One Racing	McLaren F1 GTR	BMW S70/2 6.1 L V12	G	3	(United Kingdom) Andy Wallace	1–8
(United Kingdom) Gulf Racing/GTC Motorsport (United Kingdom) Marlboro McLaren Team GTC (Note: Gulf Racing/GTC Motorsport was rebranded as Marlboro McLaren Team GTC for the Zhuhai round only.)	McLaren F1 GTR	BMW S70/2 6.1 L V12	M	2	(United Kingdom) Ray Bellm	All
(United Kingdom) Gulf Racing/GTC Motorsport (United Kingdom) Marlboro McLaren Team GTC	McLaren F1 GTR	BMW S70/2 6.1 L V12	M	2	(United Kingdom) James Weaver	All
(United Kingdom) Gulf Racing/GTC Motorsport (United Kingdom) Marlboro McLaren Team GTC	McLaren F1 GTR	BMW S70/2 6.1 L V12	M	2	(Finland) JJ Lehto	7, 11
(United Kingdom) Gulf Racing/GTC Motorsport (United Kingdom) Marlboro McLaren Team GTC	McLaren F1 GTR	BMW S70/2 6.1 L V12	M	6	(France) Pierre-Henri Raphanel	All
(United Kingdom) Gulf Racing/GTC Motorsport (United Kingdom) Marlboro McLaren Team GTC	McLaren F1 GTR	BMW S70/2 6.1 L V12	M	6	(United Kingdom) Lindsay Owen-Jones	1–10
(United Kingdom) Gulf Racing/GTC Motorsport (United Kingdom) Marlboro McLaren Team GTC	McLaren F1 GTR	BMW S70/2 6.1 L V12	M	6	(Australia) David Brabham	7, 11
(Germany) Roock Racing	Porsche 911 GT2 Evo	Porsche 3.6 L Turbo Flat-6	M	4	(France) Jean-Pierre Jarier	1–6
(Germany) Roock Racing	Porsche 911 GT2 Evo	Porsche 3.6 L Turbo Flat-6	M	4	(Germany) Altfrid Heger	1–4
(Germany) Roock Racing	Porsche 911 GT2 Evo	Porsche 3.6 L Turbo Flat-6	M	4	(Germany) Ralf Kelleners	2, 4–6
(France) Graham	Venturi 600LM	Renault PRV 3.0 L Turbo V6	D	5	(France) Éric Graham	1–5, 7, 11
(France) Graham	Venturi 600LM	Renault PRV 3.0 L Turbo V6	D	5	(France) Michel Faraut	1–5, 7, 11
(France) Graham	Venturi 600LM	Renault PRV 3.0 L Turbo V6	D	5	(France) David Velay	1–5
(United Kingdom) John Greasley	Porsche 911 GT2 Evo	Porsche 3.6 L Turbo Flat-6	P	7	(United Kingdom) John Greasley	1, 3
(United Kingdom) John Greasley	Porsche 911 GT2 Evo	Porsche 3.6 L Turbo Flat-6	P	7	(United Kingdom) John Morrison	1, 3
(France) BBA Compétition	McLaren F1 GTR	BMW S70/2 6.1 L V12	D	8	(France) Jean-Luc Maury-Laribière	1–7, 9–10
(France) BBA Compétition	McLaren F1 GTR	BMW S70/2 6.1 L V12	D	8	(Netherlands) Hans Hugenholtz Jr.	1–5
(France) BBA Compétition	McLaren F1 GTR	BMW S70/2 6.1 L V12	D	8	(France) Marc Sourd	1
(France) BBA Compétition	McLaren F1 GTR	BMW S70/2 6.1 L V12	D	8	(Belgium) Jean-Paul Libert	2, 7, 9
(France) BBA Compétition	McLaren F1 GTR	BMW S70/2 6.1 L V12	D	8	(Spain) Javier Camp	3
(France) BBA Compétition	McLaren F1 GTR	BMW S70/2 6.1 L V12	D	8	(Belgium) Vincent Vosse	4
(France) BBA Compétition	McLaren F1 GTR	BMW S70/2 6.1 L V12	D	8	(France) Emmanuel Clérico	6–7, 9
(France) BBA Compétition	McLaren F1 GTR	BMW S70/2 6.1 L V12	D	8	(France) Marcel Tarrès	10
(France) BBA Compétition	McLaren F1 GTR	BMW S70/2 6.1 L V12	D	8	(France) Olivier Grouillard	10
(France) Franck Muller Watch	McLaren F1 GTR	BMW S70/2 6.1 L V12	M	9	(France) Fabien Giroix	1–4, 7, 11
(France) Franck Muller Watch	McLaren F1 GTR	BMW S70/2 6.1 L V12	M	9	(Switzerland) Jean-Denis Délétraz	1–4, 7, 11
(France) Franck Muller Watch	McLaren F1 GTR	BMW S70/2 6.1 L V12	M	9	(France) Didier Cottaz	1–4
(France) Franck Muller Watch	McLaren F1 GTR	BMW S70/2 6.1 L V12	M	9	(Thailand) Ratanakul Prutirat	7, 11
(Germany) Konrad Motorsport	Porsche 911 GT2 Evo	Porsche 3.6 L Turbo Flat-6	M	11	(Austria) Franz Konrad	1–7
(Germany) Konrad Motorsport	Porsche 911 GT2 Evo	Porsche 3.6 L Turbo Flat-6	M	11	(France) Bob Wollek	1–6
(Germany) Konrad Motorsport	Porsche 911 GT2 Evo	Porsche 3.6 L Turbo Flat-6	M	11	(United Kingdom) Robert Nearn	7
(Germany) Konrad Motorsport	Porsche 911 GT2 Evo	Porsche 3.6 L Turbo Flat-6	M	11	(Japan) Taki Inoue	7
(Germany) Konrad Motorsport	Porsche 911 GT2 Evo	Porsche 3.6 L Turbo Flat-6	M	11	(Czech Republic) Karel Dolejší	11
(Germany) Konrad Motorsport	Porsche 911 GT2 Evo	Porsche 3.6 L Turbo Flat-6	M	11	(France) Henri Pescarolo	11
(Germany) Konrad Motorsport	Porsche 911 GT2 Evo	Porsche 3.6 L Turbo Flat-6	M	11	(Australia) Mark Williamson	11
(France) Chardon des Dunes	Porsche 911 GT2 Evo	Porsche 3.6 L Turbo Flat-6		12	(France) Patrick Vuillaume	2, 4
(France) Chardon des Dunes	Porsche 911 GT2 Evo	Porsche 3.6 L Turbo Flat-6		12	(France) Christian Pellieux	2
(France) Chardon des Dunes	Porsche 911 GT2 Evo	Porsche 3.6 L Turbo Flat-6		12	(Germany) Andy Bovensiepen	2
(France) Chardon des Dunes	Porsche 911 GT2 Evo	Porsche 3.6 L Turbo Flat-6		12	(Italy) Olindo Iacobelli	4
(Germany) Repsol Kremer	Porsche 911 GT2 Evo	Porsche 3.6 L Turbo Flat-6	G	14	(France) Christophe Bouchut	2–3, 5, 8
(Germany) Repsol Kremer	Porsche 911 GT2 Evo	Porsche 3.6 L Turbo Flat-6	G	14	(Spain) Tomás Saldaña	2–3, 5, 8
(Germany) Repsol Kremer	Porsche 911 GT2 Evo	Porsche 3.6 L Turbo Flat-6	G	14	(Spain) Alfonso de Orléans-Borbón	2–3
(Austria) Karl Augustin	Porsche 911 GT2 Evo	Porsche 3.6 L Turbo Flat-6	G	16	(Austria) Karl Augustin	3–6, 8–11
(Austria) Karl Augustin	Porsche 911 GT2 Evo	Porsche 3.6 L Turbo Flat-6	G	16	(Germany) Ernst Gschwender	3–6, 9–11
(Austria) Karl Augustin	Porsche 911 GT2 Evo	Porsche 3.6 L Turbo Flat-6	G	16	(Austria) Alfrid Gramsel	4
(Austria) Karl Augustin	Porsche 911 GT2 Evo	Porsche 3.6 L Turbo Flat-6	G	16	(Germany) Stefan Roitmayer	8
(Austria) Karl Augustin	Porsche 911 GT2 Evo	Porsche 3.6 L Turbo Flat-6	G	16	(Austria) Johannes Huber	8
(Austria) Karl Augustin	Porsche 911 GT2 Evo	Porsche 3.6 L Turbo Flat-6	G	16	(Austria) Horst Felbermayr	9–11
(France) Viper Team Oreca	Chrysler Viper GTS-R	Chrysler 356-T6 8.0 L V10	M	17	(France) Philippe Gache	3, 8–10
(France) Viper Team Oreca	Chrysler Viper GTS-R	Chrysler 356-T6 8.0 L V10	M	17	(France) Eric Hélary	3, 8–10
(France) Viper Team Oreca	Chrysler Viper GTS-R	Chrysler 356-T6 8.0 L V10	M	32	(Monaco) Olivier Beretta	7–10
(France) Viper Team Oreca	Chrysler Viper GTS-R	Chrysler 356-T6 8.0 L V10	M	32	(France) Philippe Gache	7
(France) Viper Team Oreca	Chrysler Viper GTS-R	Chrysler 356-T6 8.0 L V10	M	32	(France) Eric Hélary	7
(France) Viper Team Oreca	Chrysler Viper GTS-R	Chrysler 356-T6 8.0 L V10	M	32	(United Kingdom) Justin Bell	8
(France) Viper Team Oreca	Chrysler Viper GTS-R	Chrysler 356-T6 8.0 L V10	M	32	(France) Alain Ferté	9
(France) Viper Team Oreca	Chrysler Viper GTS-R	Chrysler 356-T6 8.0 L V10	M	32	(France) Dominique Dupuy	10
(Switzerland) Venturi Team Lécuyer	Venturi 600SLM	Renault PRV 2.8 L Turbo V6	M	20	(Switzerland) Laurent Lécuyer	1–3
(Switzerland) Venturi Team Lécuyer	Venturi 600SLM	Renault PRV 2.8 L Turbo V6	M	20	(Switzerland) Philippe Favre	1–3
(Switzerland) Venturi Team Lécuyer	Venturi 600SLM	Renault PRV 2.8 L Turbo V6	M	20	(France) Christophe Bouchut	1
(Switzerland) Venturi Team Lécuyer	Venturi 600SLM	Renault PRV 2.8 L Turbo V6	M	20	(France) Emmanuel Clérico	2
(Switzerland) Venturi Team Lécuyer	Venturi 600SLM	Renault PRV 2.8 L Turbo V6	M	20	(France) Bernard Chauvin	3
(United Kingdom) Lotus Racing Team	Lotus Esprit GT1	Lotus Type-918 3.5 L Turbo V8	M	21	(United Kingdom) Alex Portman	1–10
(United Kingdom) Lotus Racing Team	Lotus Esprit GT1	Lotus Type-918 3.5 L Turbo V8	M	21	(Netherlands) Jan Lammers	1, 7
(United Kingdom) Lotus Racing Team	Lotus Esprit GT1	Lotus Type-918 3.5 L Turbo V8	M	21	(Netherlands) Mike Hezemans	2–10
(United Kingdom) Lotus Racing Team	Lotus Esprit GT1	Lotus Type-918 3.5 L Turbo V8	M	22	(Netherlands) Jan Lammers	2–6, 8–10
(United Kingdom) Lotus Racing Team	Lotus Esprit GT1	Lotus Type-918 3.5 L Turbo V8	M	22	(United Kingdom) Perry McCarthy	2–4
(United Kingdom) Lotus Racing Team	Lotus Esprit GT1	Lotus Type-918 3.5 L Turbo V8	M	22	(United Kingdom) Chris Goodwin	5–6, 8
(United Kingdom) Lotus Racing Team	Lotus Esprit GT1	Lotus Type-918 3.5 L Turbo V8	M	22	(United Kingdom) Andy Wallace	9
(United Kingdom) Lotus Racing Team	Lotus Esprit GT1	Lotus Type-918 3.5 L Turbo V8	M	22	(France) Fabien Giroix	10
(United Kingdom) Hugh Chamberlain (United Kingdom) Geoff Lister (Note: The No. 22 Jaguar was entered under the name of Hugh Chamberlain for Round 4, then entered under the name of Geoff Lister for Round 8.)	Jaguar XJ220	Jaguar JV6 3.5 L Turbo V6	G	23	(United Kingdom) Geoff Lister	4, 8
(United Kingdom) Hugh Chamberlain (United Kingdom) Geoff Lister	Jaguar XJ220	Jaguar JV6 3.5 L Turbo V6	G	23	(United Kingdom) Nick Adams	4
(United Kingdom) Hugh Chamberlain (United Kingdom) Geoff Lister	Jaguar XJ220	Jaguar JV6 3.5 L Turbo V6	G	23	(United Kingdom) Win Percy	8
(United Kingdom) Hugh Chamberlain (United Kingdom) Geoff Lister	Jaguar XJ220	Jaguar JV6 3.5 L Turbo V6	G	23	(United Kingdom) John Williams	8
(Italy) Bigazzi Team SRL	McLaren F1 GTR	BMW S70/2 6.1 L V12	M	24	(United Kingdom) Steve Soper	4
(Italy) Bigazzi Team SRL	McLaren F1 GTR	BMW S70/2 6.1 L V12	M	24	(Brazil) Nelson Piquet	4
(Italy) Bigazzi Team SRL	McLaren F1 GTR	BMW S70/2 6.1 L V12	M	25	(France) Jacques Lafitte	4
(Italy) Bigazzi Team SRL	McLaren F1 GTR	BMW S70/2 6.1 L V12	M	25	(Belgium) Marc Duez	4
(United Kingdom) Lister Storm	Lister Storm GTS	Jaguar 7.0 L V12	M	26	(United Kingdom) Tiff Needell	5, 7–9
(United Kingdom) Lister Storm	Lister Storm GTS	Jaguar 7.0 L V12	M	26	(United Kingdom) Geoff Lees	5, 7–9
(United Kingdom) Lister Storm	Lister Storm GTS	Jaguar 7.0 L V12	M	26	(France) Christophe Bouchut	7
(Italy) Ennea/Igol	Ferrari F40 GTE	Ferrari F120B 3.6 L Turbo V8	P	27	(Sweden) Anders Olofsson	All
(Italy) Ennea/Igol	Ferrari F40 GTE	Ferrari F120B 3.6 L Turbo V8	P	27	(Italy) Luciano Della Noce	All
(Italy) Ennea/Igol	Ferrari F40 GTE	Ferrari F120B 3.6 L Turbo V8	P	27	(Italy) Max Angelelli	9–11
(Italy) Ennea/Igol	Ferrari F40 GTE	Ferrari F120B 3.6 L Turbo V8	P	28	(France) Jean-Marc Gounon	1–7, 9–11
(Italy) Ennea/Igol	Ferrari F40 GTE	Ferrari F120B 3.6 L Turbo V8	P	28	(France) Éric Bernard	1–7, 9–11
(Italy) Ennea/Igol	Ferrari F40 GTE	Ferrari F120B 3.6 L Turbo V8	P	28	(France) Paul Belmondo	1–7, 9–11
(Italy) Ennea/Ferrari Club Italia	Ferrari F40 GTE	Ferrari F120B 3.6 L Turbo V8	P	29	(Italy) Piero Nappi	2–6
(Italy) Ennea/Ferrari Club Italia	Ferrari F40 GTE	Ferrari F120B 3.6 L Turbo V8	P	29	(Italy) Mauro Martini	2–3
(Italy) Ennea/Ferrari Club Italia	Ferrari F40 GTE	Ferrari F120B 3.6 L Turbo V8	P	29	(Italy) Luca Drudi	2–3
(Italy) Ennea/Ferrari Club Italia	Ferrari F40 GTE	Ferrari F120B 3.6 L Turbo V8	P	29	(Italy) Max Angelelli	4–7
(Italy) Ennea/Ferrari Club Italia	Ferrari F40 GTE	Ferrari F120B 3.6 L Turbo V8	P	29	(Austria) Helmut König	5
(Italy) Ennea/Ferrari Club Italia	Ferrari F40 GTE	Ferrari F120B 3.6 L Turbo V8	P	29	(Japan) Tetsuya Ota	7
(France) Piquienot/Quattro	Porsche 911 Bi-Turbo	Porsche 3.6 L Turbo Flat-6		30	(France) Patrice Pelissier	1–2
(France) Piquienot/Quattro	Porsche 911 Bi-Turbo	Porsche 3.6 L Turbo Flat-6		30	(France) Thiérry Guiod	1–2
(France) Piquienot/Quattro	Porsche 911 Bi-Turbo	Porsche 3.6 L Turbo Flat-6		30	(France) Guy Martinolle	1
(Germany) Hartmann Motorsport	Ferrari F40	Ferrari F120B 3.0 L Turbo V8	G	31	(Germany) Helmut Pfiefer	5, 9
(Germany) Hartmann Motorsport	Ferrari F40	Ferrari F120B 3.0 L Turbo V8	G	31	(Germany) Bernhard Holz	5
(Germany) Hartmann Motorsport	Ferrari F40	Ferrari F120B 3.0 L Turbo V8	G	31	(Germany) Horst Stäbler	5
(Germany) Hartmann Motorsport	Ferrari F40	Ferrari F120B 3.0 L Turbo V8	G	31	(Germany) Thomas Fritsch	9
(United Kingdom) Superpower Engineering	De Tomaso Pantera	Ford 5.0 L V8		33	(Denmark) Thorkild Thyrring	5
(United Kingdom) Superpower Engineering	De Tomaso Pantera	Ford 5.0 L V8		33	(United Kingdom) Phil Andrews	5
(United Kingdom) Superpower Engineering	De Tomaso Pantera	Ford 5.0 L V8		33	(France) Jérôme Policand	5
(Germany) Scheer Motorsport	Porsche 911 Bi-Turbo	Porsche 3.6 L Turbo Flat-6		34	(Germany) Klaus Scheer	5
(Germany) Scheer Motorsport	Porsche 911 Bi-Turbo	Porsche 3.6 L Turbo Flat-6		34	(Germany) Norbert Graf	5
(Germany) Scheer Motorsport	Porsche 911 Bi-Turbo	Porsche 3.6 L Turbo Flat-6		34	(Germany) Edgar Dören	5
(Sweden) JTI Motorsport	Porsche 911 Bi-Turbo	Porsche 3.6 L Flat-6		35	(Sweden) Örnulf Wirdheim	6
(Sweden) JTI Motorsport	Porsche 911 Bi-Turbo	Porsche 3.6 L Flat-6		35	(Sweden) Koit Veertee	6
(Germany) Porsche AG	Porsche 911 GT1	Porsche 3.2 L Turbo Flat-6	M	35	(Germany) Hans-Joachim Stuck	8–9
(Germany) Porsche AG	Porsche 911 GT1	Porsche 3.2 L Turbo Flat-6	M	35	(Belgium) Thierry Boutsen	8–9
(Germany) Porsche AG	Porsche 911 GT1	Porsche 3.2 L Turbo Flat-6	M	35	(France) Bob Wollek	11
(Germany) Porsche AG	Porsche 911 GT1	Porsche 3.2 L Turbo Flat-6	M	35	(France) Yannick Dalmas	11
(Germany) Porsche AG	Porsche 911 GT1	Porsche 3.2 L Turbo Flat-6	M	36	(France) Emmanuel Collard	11
(Germany) Porsche AG	Porsche 911 GT1	Porsche 3.2 L Turbo Flat-6	M	36	(Germany) Ralf Kelleners	11
(France) RJ Racing	Renault Sport Spider V6	Renault PRV 3.0 L Turbo V6	P	39	(France) Stéphane Daoudi	10
(France) RJ Racing	Renault Sport Spider V6	Renault PRV 3.0 L Turbo V6	P	39	(France) Marc Sourd	10
(France) Pilot Racing	Ferrari F40 LM	Ferrari F120B 3.0 L Turbo V8	M	40	(France) Michel Ferté	1, 3–5, 7, 10
(France) Pilot Racing	Ferrari F40 LM	Ferrari F120B 3.0 L Turbo V8	M	40	(France) Olivier Thévenin	1, 3–5, 7, 10
Porsche Club of Belgium	Porsche 911 GT2 Evo	Porsche 3.6 L Turbo Flat-6		42	(Belgium) Léo Van Sande	9
Porsche Club of Belgium	Porsche 911 GT2 Evo	Porsche 3.6 L Turbo Flat-6		42	(Belgium) Eddy Van der Pluym	9
(France) JCB Racing	Venturi 600LM	Renault PRV 3.0 L Turbo V6	D	43	(France) Jean-Claude Basso	1, 3–4, 10
(France) JCB Racing	Venturi 600LM	Renault PRV 3.0 L Turbo V6	D	43	(France) Henri Pescarolo	1, 3–4, 10
(France) JCB Racing	Venturi 600LM	Renault PRV 3.0 L Turbo V6	D	43	(France) Jean-Louis Ricci	10
(Japan) Team Menicon SARD	SARD MC8-R	Toyota 1UZ-FE 4.0 L Turbo V8		46	(France) Alain Ferté	7
(Japan) Team Menicon SARD	SARD MC8-R	Toyota 1UZ-FE 4.0 L Turbo V8		46	(Italy) Mauro Martini	7
(Japan) Team Menicon SARD	SARD MC8-R	Toyota 1UZ-FE 4.0 L Turbo V8		46	(Japan) Naoki Nagasaka	7
(France) Larbre Compétition	Porsche 911 GT2 Evo	Porsche 3.6 L Turbo Flat-6	M	47	(France) Jack Leconte	3
(France) Larbre Compétition	Porsche 911 GT2 Evo	Porsche 3.6 L Turbo Flat-6	M	47	(France) Jean-Luc Chéreau	3
(France) Larbre Compétition	Porsche 911 GT2 Evo	Porsche 3.6 L Turbo Flat-6	M	47	(Spain) Jésus Pareja	3
(Germany) Freisinger Motorsport	Porsche 911 GT2 Evo	Porsche 3.6 L Turbo Flat-6	G	48	(France) Guy Broissiat	1
(Germany) Freisinger Motorsport	Porsche 911 GT2 Evo	Porsche 3.6 L Turbo Flat-6	G	48	(France) Michel Mora	1
(Germany) Freisinger Motorsport	Porsche 911 GT2 Evo	Porsche 3.6 L Turbo Flat-6	G	48	(France) Jean-Pierre Castel	1
(Germany) Freisinger Motorsport	Porsche 911 GT2 Evo	Porsche 3.6 L Turbo Flat-6	G	48	(Italy) Fulvio Ballabio	2–3, 5
(Germany) Freisinger Motorsport	Porsche 911 GT2 Evo	Porsche 3.6 L Turbo Flat-6	G	48	(Switzerland) Clay Regazzoni	2, 5
(Germany) Freisinger Motorsport	Porsche 911 GT2 Evo	Porsche 3.6 L Turbo Flat-6	G	48	(France) Henri Pescarolo	2
(Germany) Freisinger Motorsport	Porsche 911 GT2 Evo	Porsche 3.6 L Turbo Flat-6	G	48	(Spain) Emilio de Villota	3
(Germany) Freisinger Motorsport	Porsche 911 GT2 Evo	Porsche 3.6 L Turbo Flat-6	G	48	(Germany) Hans-Joachim Stuck	5
(Germany) Freisinger Motorsport	Porsche 911 GT2 Evo	Porsche 3.6 L Turbo Flat-6	G	49	(Germany) Wolfgang Kaufmann	1–7, 9, 11
(Germany) Freisinger Motorsport	Porsche 911 GT2 Evo	Porsche 3.6 L Turbo Flat-6	G	49	(Netherlands) Mike Hezemans	1
(Germany) Freisinger Motorsport	Porsche 911 GT2 Evo	Porsche 3.6 L Turbo Flat-6	G	49	(France) Stéphane Grégoire	1
(Germany) Freisinger Motorsport	Porsche 911 GT2 Evo	Porsche 3.6 L Turbo Flat-6	G	49	(Italy) Pietro Ferrero	2
(Germany) Freisinger Motorsport	Porsche 911 GT2 Evo	Porsche 3.6 L Turbo Flat-6	G	49	(France) Richard Flammang	3
(Germany) Freisinger Motorsport	Porsche 911 GT2 Evo	Porsche 3.6 L Turbo Flat-6	G	49	(United Kingdom) Derek Bell	4
(Germany) Freisinger Motorsport	Porsche 911 GT2 Evo	Porsche 3.6 L Turbo Flat-6	G	49	(United Kingdom) Richard Dean	4
(Germany) Freisinger Motorsport	Porsche 911 GT2 Evo	Porsche 3.6 L Turbo Flat-6	G	49	(Japan) Yukihiro Hane	5
(Germany) Freisinger Motorsport	Porsche 911 GT2 Evo	Porsche 3.6 L Turbo Flat-6	G	49	(France) Patrick Vuillaume	5
(Germany) Freisinger Motorsport	Porsche 911 GT2 Evo	Porsche 3.6 L Turbo Flat-6	G	49	(Germany) Jürgen Barth	6
(Germany) Freisinger Motorsport	Porsche 911 GT2 Evo	Porsche 3.6 L Turbo Flat-6	G	49	(Belgium) Thierry Boutsen	7
(Germany) Freisinger Motorsport	Porsche 911 GT2 Evo	Porsche 3.6 L Turbo Flat-6	G	49	(France) Olivier Grouillard	9
(Germany) Freisinger Motorsport	Porsche 911 GT2 Evo	Porsche 3.6 L Turbo Flat-6	G	49	(France) Jean-Pierre Jarier	11
(Japan) Ken Wolf with JLOC Corsa	Lamborghini Diablo Jota	Lamborghini 5.5 L V12		188	(Japan) Takao Wada	7
(Japan) Ken Wolf with JLOC Corsa	Lamborghini Diablo Jota	Lamborghini 5.5 L V12		188	(Japan) Hideo Fukuyama	7
(Japan) Ken Wolf with JLOC Corsa	Lamborghini Diablo Jota	Lamborghini 5.5 L V12		188	(Italy) Luigi Moccia	7

=== GT2 ===
Entrant	Car	Engine	Tyre	No.	Drivers	Rounds
(Japan) Prova Motorsport	Porsche 911 GT2	Porsche 3.6 L Turbo Flat-6	D	16	(Japan) Tetsuhumi Toda	7
(Japan) Prova Motorsport	Porsche 911 GT2	Porsche 3.6 L Turbo Flat-6	D	16	(Japan) Akio Tomita	7
(Japan) Prova Motorsport	Porsche 911 GT2	Porsche 3.6 L Turbo Flat-6	D	16	(Japan) Eiji Yamada	7
(Japan) Team Nicos	Porsche 911 GT2	Porsche 3.6 L Turbo Flat-6	B	30	(Japan) Youji Yamada	7
(Japan) Team Nicos	Porsche 911 GT2	Porsche 3.6 L Turbo Flat-6	B	30	(Japan) Eiichi Tajima	7
(Japan) Team Nicos	Porsche 911 GT2	Porsche 3.6 L Turbo Flat-6	B	30	(Japan) Kazuo Mogi	7
(Switzerland) Stadler Motorsport	Porsche 911 GT2	Porsche 3.6 L Turbo Flat-6	P	50	(Switzerland) Uwe Sick	1–6, 8–9, 11
(Switzerland) Stadler Motorsport	Porsche 911 GT2	Porsche 3.6 L Turbo Flat-6	P	50	(Switzerland) Charles Margueron	1–5
(Switzerland) Stadler Motorsport	Porsche 911 GT2	Porsche 3.6 L Turbo Flat-6	P	50	(Italy) Renato Mastropietro	4, 8, 11
(Switzerland) Stadler Motorsport	Porsche 911 GT2	Porsche 3.6 L Turbo Flat-6	P	50	(Italy) Luigino Pagotto	6, 9
(Switzerland) Stadler Motorsport	Porsche 911 GT2	Porsche 3.6 L Turbo Flat-6	P	50	(Italy) Ruggero Grassi	11
(Switzerland) Stadler Motorsport	Porsche 911 GT2	Porsche 3.6 L Turbo Flat-6	P	55	(Switzerland) Enzo Calderari	All
(Switzerland) Stadler Motorsport	Porsche 911 GT2	Porsche 3.6 L Turbo Flat-6	P	55	(Switzerland) Lilian Bryner	All
(Switzerland) Stadler Motorsport	Porsche 911 GT2	Porsche 3.6 L Turbo Flat-6	P	55	(Germany) Ulli Richter	5, 7, 9, 11
(Germany) Proton Competition	Porsche 911 GT2	Porsche 3.6 L Turbo Flat-6	P	51	(Germany) Gerold Ried	1–2, 4, 7, 11
(Germany) Proton Competition	Porsche 911 GT2	Porsche 3.6 L Turbo Flat-6	P	51	(Germany) Peter Erl	1–2, 4
(Germany) Proton Competition	Porsche 911 GT2	Porsche 3.6 L Turbo Flat-6	P	51	(France) Patrick Vuillaume	3, 7, 11
(Germany) Proton Competition	Porsche 911 GT2	Porsche 3.6 L Turbo Flat-6	P	51	(France) Christian Pellieux	3, 7
(Germany) Proton Competition	Porsche 911 GT2	Porsche 3.6 L Turbo Flat-6	P	69	(Germany) Gerold Ried	3–6, 8–10
(Germany) Proton Competition	Porsche 911 GT2	Porsche 3.6 L Turbo Flat-6	P	69	(Germany) Peter Erl	3–6
(Germany) Proton Competition	Porsche 911 GT2	Porsche 3.6 L Turbo Flat-6	P	69	(Germany) Andy Bovensiepen	3
(Germany) Proton Competition	Porsche 911 GT2	Porsche 3.6 L Turbo Flat-6	P	69	(France) Patrick Vuillaume	6, 8–10
(Germany) Proton Competition	Porsche 911 GT2	Porsche 3.6 L Turbo Flat-6	P	69	(Netherlands) Harm Lagaay	9
(Germany) Krauß Rennsporttechnik	Porsche 911 GT2	Porsche 3.6 L Turbo Flat-6	P	52	(Germany) Bernhard Müller	1–6, 8–10
(Germany) Krauß Rennsporttechnik	Porsche 911 GT2	Porsche 3.6 L Turbo Flat-6	P	52	(Germany) Michael Trunk	1–6, 8–10
(France) Yellow Racing	Ferrari F355	Ferrari F129B 3.5 L V8	M	53	(France) Christian Heinkélé	1–6, 8
(France) Yellow Racing	Ferrari F355	Ferrari F129B 3.5 L V8	M	53	(Sweden) Tony Ring	1–6
(France) Yellow Racing	Ferrari F355	Ferrari F129B 3.5 L V8	M	53	(Switzerland) Jean Gay	1, 3, 6
(France) Yellow Racing	Ferrari F355	Ferrari F129B 3.5 L V8	M	53	(Switzerland) Henri-Louis Maunoir	2, 4, 8
(France) Yellow Racing	Ferrari F355	Ferrari F129B 3.5 L V8	M	53	(France) François O'Born	5, 8
(Netherlands) Bert Ploeg	Porsche 911 GT2	Porsche 3.6 L Turbo Flat-6		54	(Netherlands) Bert Ploeg	1–2
(Netherlands) Bert Ploeg	Porsche 911 GT2	Porsche 3.6 L Turbo Flat-6		54	(Netherlands) Tom Langeberg	1
(Netherlands) Bert Ploeg	Porsche 911 GT2	Porsche 3.6 L Turbo Flat-6		54	(France) François Birbeau	1
(Netherlands) Bert Ploeg	Porsche 911 GT2	Porsche 3.6 L Turbo Flat-6		54	(Netherlands) Kris Nissen	2
(Germany) Roock Racing	Porsche 911 GT2	Porsche 3.6 L Turbo Flat-6	M	56	(Germany) Gerd Ruch	All
(Germany) Roock Racing	Porsche 911 GT2	Porsche 3.6 L Turbo Flat-6	M	56	(Switzerland) Bruno Eichmann	All
(Germany) Roock Racing	Porsche 911 GT2	Porsche 3.6 L Turbo Flat-6	M	56	(Germany) Ralf Kelleners	1–3, 7–10
(Germany) Roock Racing	Porsche 911 GT2	Porsche 3.6 L Turbo Flat-6	M	56	(Belgium) Michel Neugarten	4–6
(Germany) Roock Racing	Porsche 911 GT2	Porsche 3.6 L Turbo Flat-6	M	56	(Monaco) Stéphane Ortelli	11
(Germany) Roock Racing	Porsche 911 GT2	Porsche 3.6 L Turbo Flat-6	M	65	(France) Jean-Marc Smadja	1, 3–5, 11
(Germany) Roock Racing	Porsche 911 GT2	Porsche 3.6 L Turbo Flat-6	M	65	(France) François Lafon	1, 3–5
(Germany) Roock Racing	Porsche 911 GT2	Porsche 3.6 L Turbo Flat-6	M	65	(France) Lucien Guitteny	1, 3–5
(Germany) Roock Racing	Porsche 911 GT2	Porsche 3.6 L Turbo Flat-6	M	65	(France) Guy Martinolle	2, 7–9, 11
(Germany) Roock Racing	Porsche 911 GT2	Porsche 3.6 L Turbo Flat-6	M	65	(France) Jean-Claude Lagniez	2, 7–9, 11
(Germany) Roock Racing	Porsche 911 GT2	Porsche 3.6 L Turbo Flat-6	M	65	(France) Philippe Albera	2
(Germany) Roock Racing	Porsche 911 GT2	Porsche 3.6 L Turbo Flat-6	M	65	(Italy) Stefano Buttiero	6, 9–10
(Germany) Roock Racing	Porsche 911 GT2	Porsche 3.6 L Turbo Flat-6	M	65	(Netherlands) Hans Hugenholtz Jr.	6
(Germany) Roock Racing	Porsche 911 GT2	Porsche 3.6 L Turbo Flat-6	M	65	(Japan) Tomiko Yoshikawa	7
(Germany) Roock Racing	Porsche 911 GT2	Porsche 3.6 L Turbo Flat-6	M	65	(United States) Andy Pilgrim	8
(Germany) Roock Racing	Porsche 911 GT2	Porsche 3.6 L Turbo Flat-6	M	65	(Germany) Claudia Hürtgen	10
(Germany) Roock Racing	Porsche 911 GT2	Porsche 3.6 L Turbo Flat-6	M	65	(Italy) Gabriele Marotta	10
(Germany) Roock Racing	Porsche 911 GT2	Porsche 3.6 L Turbo Flat-6	M	106	(France) Jean-Marc Smadja	8–10
(Germany) Roock Racing	Porsche 911 GT2	Porsche 3.6 L Turbo Flat-6	M	106	(France) François Lafon	8–10
(Germany) Roock Racing	Porsche 911 GT2	Porsche 3.6 L Turbo Flat-6	M	106	(France) Jean-Pierre Jarier	8, 10
(Germany) Roock Racing	Porsche 911 GT2	Porsche 3.6 L Turbo Flat-6	M	106	(France) Jean-Pierre Jabouille	9
(Germany) Roock Racing	Porsche 911 GT2	Porsche 3.6 L Turbo Flat-6	M	106	(United States) Andy Pilgrim	11
(Germany) Roock Racing	Porsche 911 GT2	Porsche 3.6 L Turbo Flat-6	M	106	(Germany) Claudia Hürtgen	11
(Germany) Roock Racing	Porsche 911 GT2	Porsche 3.6 L Turbo Flat-6	M	106	(France) Michel Ligonnet	11
(Germany) Freisinger Motorsport	Porsche 911 GT2	Porsche 3.6 L Turbo Flat-6	G	57	(France) Michel Quiniou	1, 7
(Germany) Freisinger Motorsport	Porsche 911 GT2	Porsche 3.6 L Turbo Flat-6	G	57	(France) Richard Flammang	1, 7
(Germany) Freisinger Motorsport	Porsche 911 GT2	Porsche 3.6 L Turbo Flat-6	G	57	(France) Michel Ligonnet	1
(Germany) Freisinger Motorsport	Porsche 911 GT2	Porsche 3.6 L Turbo Flat-6	G	57	(Austria) Manfred Jurasz	3
(Germany) Freisinger Motorsport	Porsche 911 GT2	Porsche 3.6 L Turbo Flat-6	G	57	(Belgium) Marc Schoonbroodt	3
(Germany) Freisinger Motorsport	Porsche 911 GT2	Porsche 3.6 L Turbo Flat-6	G	57	(Japan) Yukihiro Hane	11
(Germany) Freisinger Motorsport	Porsche 911 GT2	Porsche 3.6 L Turbo Flat-6	G	57	(France) Emmanuel Clérico	11
(Italy) MC Motorsport	Ferrari F355	Ferrari F129B 3.5 L V8		58	(Italy) Luca Canni-Ferrari	2
(Italy) MC Motorsport	Ferrari F355	Ferrari F129B 3.5 L V8		58	(Italy) Massimo Monti	2
(France) Raymond Touroul	Porsche 911 Cup	Porsche 3.8 L Flat-6	M	59	(France) Didier Ortion	1–5, 9–10
(France) Raymond Touroul	Porsche 911 Cup	Porsche 3.8 L Flat-6	M	59	(France) Raymond Touroul	1–5, 10
(France) Raymond Touroul	Porsche 911 Cup	Porsche 3.8 L Flat-6	M	59	(France) Jean-Louis Ricci	2–3, 9
(France) Raymond Touroul	Porsche 911 Cup	Porsche 3.8 L Flat-6	M	59	(France) Jean-Claude Lagniez	4
(France) Raymond Touroul	Porsche 911 Cup	Porsche 3.8 L Flat-6	M	59	(France) Therry Perrier	5
(France) Raymond Touroul	Porsche 911 Cup	Porsche 3.8 L Flat-6	M	59	(France) Jean-Claude Barthe	9
(France) Raymond Touroul	Porsche 911 Cup	Porsche 3.8 L Flat-6	M	59	(France) François Jakubowski	10
(Germany) Oberbayern Motorsport	Porsche 911 GT2	Porsche 3.6 L Turbo Flat-6	P	60	(Germany) Jürgen von Gartzen	1–4, 8
(Germany) Oberbayern Motorsport	Porsche 911 GT2	Porsche 3.6 L Turbo Flat-6	P	60	(Germany) Detlef Hübner	1–2, 8
(Germany) Oberbayern Motorsport	Porsche 911 GT2	Porsche 3.6 L Turbo Flat-6	P	60	(Netherlands) Patrick Huisman	3–4, 8
(Italy) Luca Cattaneo	Porsche 911 Cup	Porsche 3.6 L Flat-6		62	(Italy) Luca Cattaneo	1–2
(Italy) Luca Cattaneo	Porsche 911 Cup	Porsche 3.6 L Flat-6		62	(Italy) Alberto Mondinelli	1–2
(Italy) Luca Cattaneo	Porsche 911 Cup	Porsche 3.6 L Flat-6		62	(Italy) Lino Bardelli	1
(Italy) Roger Racing	Porsche 911 Cup	Porsche 3.8 L Flat-6	P	63	(Italy) Ruggero Grassi	1–2
(Italy) Roger Racing	Porsche 911 Cup	Porsche 3.8 L Flat-6	P	63	(Italy) Mario Passerini	1
(Italy) Roger Racing	Porsche 911 Cup	Porsche 3.8 L Flat-6	P	63	(Italy) Ermanno Colombo	2
(United Kingdom) Lanzante Motorsport	Porsche 911 GT2	Porsche 3.6 L Turbo Flat-6	M D	64	(United Kingdom) Soames Langton	1–10
(United Kingdom) Lanzante Motorsport	Porsche 911 GT2	Porsche 3.6 L Turbo Flat-6	M D	64	(United States) Paul Burdell	1–10
(United Kingdom) Lanzante Motorsport	Porsche 911 GT2	Porsche 3.6 L Turbo Flat-6	M D	64	(Sweden) Stanley Dickens	1–4
(United Kingdom) Lanzante Motorsport	Porsche 911 GT2	Porsche 3.6 L Turbo Flat-6	M D	64	(France) Yannick Dalmas	7
(United Kingdom) Lanzante Motorsport	Porsche 911 GT2	Porsche 3.6 L Turbo Flat-6	M D	64	(United Kingdom) Mark Hales	10
(United Kingdom) Steve O'Rourke	Porsche 911 GT2	Porsche 3.6 L Turbo Flat-6	D	66	(United Kingdom) Steve O'Rourke	1–2, 4–6, 8
(United Kingdom) Steve O'Rourke	Porsche 911 GT2	Porsche 3.6 L Turbo Flat-6	D	66	(United Kingdom) Guy Holmes	1–2, 4–6, 8
(United Kingdom) Steve O'Rourke	Porsche 911 GT2	Porsche 3.6 L Turbo Flat-6	D	66	(United Kingdom) Nick Mason	4
(United Kingdom) Simpson Engineering	Porsche 911 Bi-Turbo	Porsche 3.6 L Turbo Flat-6		67	(Italy) Raffaele Sangiuolo	1–2
(United Kingdom) Simpson Engineering	Porsche 911 Bi-Turbo	Porsche 3.6 L Turbo Flat-6		67	(Italy) Renato Mastropietro	1
(United Kingdom) Simpson Engineering	Porsche 911 Bi-Turbo	Porsche 3.6 L Turbo Flat-6		67	(Italy) Vincenzo Polli	1
(United Kingdom) Simpson Engineering	Porsche 911 Bi-Turbo	Porsche 3.6 L Turbo Flat-6		67	(Italy) Maurizio Lusuardi	2
(United Kingdom) Simpson Engineering	Porsche 911 Bi-Turbo	Porsche 3.6 L Turbo Flat-6		67	(Austria) Hans-Jörg Hofer	2
(France) Jean-François Metz	VBM 4000 GTC	Renault PRV 3.0 L Turbo V6		68	(France) Jean-François Metz	1
(France) Jean-François Metz	VBM 4000 GTC	Renault PRV 3.0 L Turbo V6		68	(France) Patrick Bornhauser	1
(France) Jean-François Véroux	Porsche 911 GT2	Porsche 3.6 L Turbo Flat-6	G	70	(France) Jean-François Véroux	1–2, 4
(France) Jean-François Véroux	Porsche 911 GT2	Porsche 3.6 L Turbo Flat-6	G	70	(France) Jean-Yves Moine	1–2, 4
(France) Jean-François Véroux	Porsche 911 GT2	Porsche 3.6 L Turbo Flat-6	G	70	(France) Stéphane Leloup	1–2, 4
(France) Lotus Equipe	Lotus Esprit Sport 300	Lotus Type-910S 2.2 L Turbo I4		71	(France) Pascal Dro	2
(France) Lotus Equipe	Lotus Esprit Sport 300	Lotus Type-910S 2.2 L Turbo I4		71	(France) Jean-Yves Pezant	2
(France) Lotus Equipe	Lotus Esprit Sport 300	Lotus Type-910S 2.2 L Turbo I4		71	(Italy) Guido Daccò	2
(France) Legeay Sports	Alpine A610	Renault PRV 3.0 L Turbo V6		72	(France) Patrick Legeay	1
(France) Legeay Sports	Alpine A610	Renault PRV 3.0 L Turbo V6		72	(France) Benjamin Roy	1
(United Kingdom) Charles Morgan	Morgan Plus 8 GTR	Rover 5.0 L V8	D	73	(United Kingdom) William Wykeham	1–6, 8–10
(United Kingdom) Charles Morgan	Morgan Plus 8 GTR	Rover 5.0 L V8	D	73	(United Kingdom) Charles Morgan	1–6, 9–10
(United Kingdom) Charles Morgan	Morgan Plus 8 GTR	Rover 5.0 L V8	D	73	(United Kingdom) Steve Lawrence	8–9
(United Kingdom) Charles Morgan	Morgan Plus 8 GTR	Rover 5.0 L V8	D	73	(United Kingdom) Joel Wykeham	8
(Switzerland) Callaway Schweiz	Callaway Corvette LM600	Chevrolet 6.2 L V8	Y	74	(Switzerland) Kurt Huber	1–2, 5, 7
(Switzerland) Callaway Schweiz	Callaway Corvette LM600	Chevrolet 6.2 L V8	Y	74	(Switzerland) Hans Hauser	1–2, 5, 7
(Switzerland) Callaway Schweiz	Callaway Corvette LM600	Chevrolet 6.2 L V8	Y	74	(Germany) Seppi Wendlinger	2
(Switzerland) Callaway Schweiz	Callaway Corvette LM600	Chevrolet 6.2 L V8	Y	74	(Switzerland) Andrea Chiesa	5, 7
(United Kingdom) Agusta Racing Team	Callaway Corvette LM600	Chevrolet 6.2 L V8	D	75	(Italy) Almo Coppelli	1–2, 5–6, 8
(United Kingdom) Agusta Racing Team	Callaway Corvette LM600	Chevrolet 6.2 L V8	D	75	(Italy) Marco Spinelli	1, 5–6
(United Kingdom) Agusta Racing Team	Callaway Corvette LM600	Chevrolet 6.2 L V8	D	75	(Italy) Sandro Munari	1
(United Kingdom) Agusta Racing Team	Callaway Corvette LM600	Chevrolet 6.2 L V8	D	75	(Italy) Rocky Agusta	2–3, 5, 8
(United Kingdom) Agusta Racing Team	Callaway Corvette LM600	Chevrolet 6.2 L V8	D	75	(Italy) Bruno Corradi	2
(United Kingdom) Agusta Racing Team	Callaway Corvette LM600	Chevrolet 6.2 L V8	D	75	(France) Philippe Smaniotto	3
(United Kingdom) Agusta Racing Team	Callaway Corvette LM600	Chevrolet 6.2 L V8	D	76	(Italy) Marco Spinelli	1–3
(United Kingdom) Agusta Racing Team	Callaway Corvette LM600	Chevrolet 6.2 L V8	D	76	(Italy) Rocky Agusta	1, 4
(United Kingdom) Agusta Racing Team	Callaway Corvette LM600	Chevrolet 6.2 L V8	D	76	(France) Patrick Camus	1
(United Kingdom) Agusta Racing Team	Callaway Corvette LM600	Chevrolet 6.2 L V8	D	76	(Italy) Sandro Munari	2
(United Kingdom) Agusta Racing Team	Callaway Corvette LM600	Chevrolet 6.2 L V8	D	76	(Italy) Almo Coppelli	3–4
(Germany) Seikel Motorsport	Porsche 911 GT2	Porsche 3.6 L Turbo Flat-6	P	77	(Austria) Manfred Jurasz	1–2, 4–5, 7, 9–10
(Germany) Seikel Motorsport	Porsche 911 GT2	Porsche 3.6 L Turbo Flat-6	P	77	(Italy) Giuseppe Quargentan	1–2, 4–5, 7
(Germany) Seikel Motorsport	Porsche 911 GT2	Porsche 3.6 L Turbo Flat-6	P	77	(France) Pascal Dro	1
(Germany) Seikel Motorsport	Porsche 911 GT2	Porsche 3.6 L Turbo Flat-6	P	77	(Germany) Peter Seikel	2, 5–6, 8–10
(Germany) Seikel Motorsport	Porsche 911 GT2	Porsche 3.6 L Turbo Flat-6	P	77	(Germany) Hermann Bilz	4, 6
(Germany) Seikel Motorsport	Porsche 911 GT2	Porsche 3.6 L Turbo Flat-6	P	77	(France) Jacques Corbet	6, 10
(Germany) Seikel Motorsport	Porsche 911 GT2	Porsche 3.6 L Turbo Flat-6	P	77	(Japan) Takashi Suzuki	7
(Germany) Seikel Motorsport	Porsche 911 GT2	Porsche 3.6 L Turbo Flat-6	P	77	(Czech Republic) Karel Dolejší	8
(Germany) Seikel Motorsport	Porsche 911 GT2	Porsche 3.6 L Turbo Flat-6	P	77	(United Kingdom) Peter Chambers	8
(Germany) Seikel Motorsport	Porsche 911 GT2	Porsche 3.6 L Turbo Flat-6	P	77	(Germany) Fred Rosterg	9
(Germany) Seikel Motorsport	Porsche 911 GT2	Porsche 3.6 L Turbo Flat-6	P	78	(Austria) Helmut König	3–4, 8–9
(Germany) Seikel Motorsport	Porsche 911 GT2	Porsche 3.6 L Turbo Flat-6	P	78	(Austria) Hermann Duller	3–4
(Germany) Seikel Motorsport	Porsche 911 GT2	Porsche 3.6 L Turbo Flat-6	P	78	(Germany) Harald Becker	8–9
(Portugal) Jumbo Pão de Açúcar	Porsche 911 GT2	Porsche 3.6 L Turbo Flat-6	P	79	(Portugal) Manuel Mello-Breyner	3
(Portugal) Jumbo Pão de Açúcar	Porsche 911 GT2	Porsche 3.6 L Turbo Flat-6	P	79	(Portugal) Thomaz Mello-Breyner	3
(Portugal) Jumbo Pão de Açúcar	Porsche 911 GT2	Porsche 3.6 L Turbo Flat-6	P	79	(Portugal) Pedro Mello-Breyner	3
Porsche Club of Belgium	Porsche 911 GT2	Porsche 3.6 L Turbo Flat-6	P	80	(Belgium) Thierry van Dalen	3–4
Porsche Club of Belgium	Porsche 911 GT2	Porsche 3.6 L Turbo Flat-6	P	80	(Belgium) Léo Sande	3–4
Porsche Club of Belgium	Porsche 911 GT2	Porsche 3.6 L Turbo Flat-6	P	81	(Belgium) Eddy Van der Pluym	3–4
Porsche Club of Belgium	Porsche 911 GT2	Porsche 3.6 L Turbo Flat-6	P	81	(Belgium) Guy Grammet	3–4
(Netherlands) Marcos Racing International	Marcos LM600	Chevrolet 6.1 L V8	D	83	(Netherlands) Cor Euser	All
(Netherlands) Marcos Racing International	Marcos LM600	Chevrolet 6.1 L V8	D	83	(Brazil) Thomas Erdos	1–6, 8–10
(Netherlands) Marcos Racing International	Marcos LM600	Chevrolet 6.1 L V8	D	83	(France) Gérard Bacle	1
(Netherlands) Marcos Racing International	Marcos LM600	Chevrolet 6.1 L V8	D	83	(France) Ferdinand de Lesseps	6, 8–9
(Netherlands) Marcos Racing International	Marcos LM600	Chevrolet 6.1 L V8	D	83	(Japan) Hisashi Wada	7
(Netherlands) Marcos Racing International	Marcos LM600	Chevrolet 6.1 L V8	D	83	(Japan) Naohiro Furuya	7
(Netherlands) Marcos Racing International	Marcos LM600	Chevrolet 6.1 L V8	D	83	(Netherlands) Hans Tepas	11
(Netherlands) Marcos Racing International	Marcos LM600	Chevrolet 6.1 L V8	D	83	(Indonesia) Chandra Alim	11
(Italy) Promosport Italia	Porsche 911 GT2	Porsche 3.6 L Turbo Flat-6	P	84	(Italy) Renato Mastropietro	2–3, 5, 9
(Italy) Promosport Italia	Porsche 911 GT2	Porsche 3.6 L Turbo Flat-6	P	84	(Italy) Vincenzo Polli	2–3, 5, 9
(Italy) Promosport Italia	Porsche 911 GT2	Porsche 3.6 L Turbo Flat-6	P	84	(Italy) Giovanni Lavaggi	2, 5
(Italy) Promosport Italia	Porsche 911 GT2	Porsche 3.6 L Turbo Flat-6	P	84	(Italy) Andrea Barenghi	3, 9
(Italy) Gian Luigi Locatelli	Porsche 911 Cup	Porsche 3.8 L Flat-6	P	85	(Italy) Gian Luigi Locatelli	2, 4–6, 8–9
(Italy) Gian Luigi Locatelli	Porsche 911 Cup	Porsche 3.8 L Flat-6	P	85	(Italy) Leonardo Maddalena	2, 4–6, 8–9
(Germany) RWS-Brun Motorsport	Porsche 911 GT2	Porsche 3.6 L Turbo Flat-6	P	87	(Italy) Raffaele Sangiuolo	3–6, 8, 10
(Germany) RWS-Brun Motorsport	Porsche 911 GT2	Porsche 3.6 L Turbo Flat-6	P	87	(Netherlands) Patrick Huisman	3
(Germany) RWS-Brun Motorsport	Porsche 911 GT2	Porsche 3.6 L Turbo Flat-6	P	87	(Austria) Hans-Jörg Hofer	4, 6, 10
(Germany) RWS-Brun Motorsport	Porsche 911 GT2	Porsche 3.6 L Turbo Flat-6	P	87	(Germany) Harald Becker	4
(Germany) RWS-Brun Motorsport	Porsche 911 GT2	Porsche 3.6 L Turbo Flat-6	P	87	(Germany) Gottfried Rampl	5–6, 8, 10
(Germany) RWS-Brun Motorsport	Porsche 911 GT2	Porsche 3.6 L Turbo Flat-6	P	87	(France) Michel Ligonnet	5
(Germany) RWS-Brun Motorsport	Porsche 911 GT2	Porsche 3.6 L Turbo Flat-6	P	87	(United Kingdom) Jonathan Baker	8
(Germany) Konrad Motorsport	Porsche 911 GT2	Porsche 3.6 L Turbo Flat-6	M	88	(Switzerland) Toni Seiler	1–3, 5–6
(Germany) Konrad Motorsport	Porsche 911 GT2	Porsche 3.6 L Turbo Flat-6	M	88	(Brazil) André Lara-Resende	1, 3–4
(Germany) Konrad Motorsport	Porsche 911 GT2	Porsche 3.6 L Turbo Flat-6	M	88	(France) Michel Ligonnet	2
(Germany) Konrad Motorsport	Porsche 911 GT2	Porsche 3.6 L Turbo Flat-6	M	88	(Austria) Helmut König	2
(Germany) Konrad Motorsport	Porsche 911 GT2	Porsche 3.6 L Turbo Flat-6	M	88	(Brazil) Gualter Salles	4
(Germany) Konrad Motorsport	Porsche 911 GT2	Porsche 3.6 L Turbo Flat-6	M	88	(Brazil) Roberto Aranha	4
(Germany) Konrad Motorsport	Porsche 911 GT2	Porsche 3.6 L Turbo Flat-6	M	88	(Austria) Franz Konrad	5, 7–11
(Germany) Konrad Motorsport	Porsche 911 GT2	Porsche 3.6 L Turbo Flat-6	M	88	(Germany) Wido Rössler	5, 11
(Germany) Konrad Motorsport	Porsche 911 GT2	Porsche 3.6 L Turbo Flat-6	M	88	(Monaco) Stéphane Ortelli	6–9
(Germany) Konrad Motorsport	Porsche 911 GT2	Porsche 3.6 L Turbo Flat-6	M	88	(France) Bob Wollek	7–10
(Germany) Konrad Motorsport	Porsche 911 GT2	Porsche 3.6 L Turbo Flat-6	M	88	(Sweden) Carl Rosenblad	11
(Germany) Konrad Motorsport	Porsche 911 GT2	Porsche 3.6 L Turbo Flat-6	M	107	(Switzerland) Toni Seiler	8–9
(Germany) Konrad Motorsport	Porsche 911 GT2	Porsche 3.6 L Turbo Flat-6	M	107	(United Kingdom) Robert Nearn	8
(Germany) Konrad Motorsport	Porsche 911 GT2	Porsche 3.6 L Turbo Flat-6	M	107	(Netherlands) Bert Ploeg	8
(Germany) Konrad Motorsport	Porsche 911 GT2	Porsche 3.6 L Turbo Flat-6	M	107	(Germany) Wido Rössler	9
(Germany) Konrad Motorsport	Porsche 911 GT2	Porsche 3.6 L Turbo Flat-6	M	107	(Brazil) André Lara-Resende	10
(Germany) Konrad Motorsport	Porsche 911 GT2	Porsche 3.6 L Turbo Flat-6	M	107	(Brazil) Roberto Aranha	10
(Germany) Konrad Motorsport	Porsche 911 GT2	Porsche 3.6 L Turbo Flat-6	M	107	(Czech Republic) Karel Dolejší	10
(United Kingdom) Team Marcos	Marcos LM600	Chevrolet 6.1 L V8	D	89	(United Kingdom) Robert Schirle	4, 8, 11
(United Kingdom) Team Marcos	Marcos LM600	Chevrolet 6.1 L V8	D	89	(United Kingdom) David Warnock	4, 8
(United Kingdom) Team Marcos	Marcos LM600	Chevrolet 6.1 L V8	D	89	(United Kingdom) Andy Purvis	4, 8
(United Kingdom) Team Marcos	Marcos LM600	Chevrolet 6.1 L V8	D	89	(United Kingdom) Phil Andrews	11
(United Kingdom) Team Marcos	Marcos LM600	Chevrolet 6.1 L V8	D	89	(United Kingdom) Adam Topping	11
(Italy) Robert Sikkens Racing	Porsche 911 GT2	Porsche 3.6 L Turbo Flat-6	G	90	(Italy) Angelo Zadra	1–2, 4–5, 8–9
(Italy) Robert Sikkens Racing	Porsche 911 GT2	Porsche 3.6 L Turbo Flat-6	G	90	(Italy) Maurizio Monforte	1–2, 4–5, 8–9
(Italy) Robert Sikkens Racing	Porsche 911 GT2	Porsche 3.6 L Turbo Flat-6	G	90	(Italy) Luca Drudi	4, 8
(France) V de V Racing Team	Gillet Vertigo V de V	Ford Cosworth 2.0 L Turbo I4	M	91	(France) Eric van de Vyver	3–5, 10
(France) V de V Racing Team	Gillet Vertigo V de V	Ford Cosworth 2.0 L Turbo I4	M	91	(Belgium) Philippe Adams	3–4
(France) V de V Racing Team	Gillet Vertigo V de V	Ford Cosworth 2.0 L Turbo I4	M	91	(France) Erick Rumpler	5
(France) V de V Racing Team	Gillet Vertigo V de V	Ford Cosworth 2.0 L Turbo I4	M	91	(France) Jérôme Policand	10
(New Zealand) Parr Motorsport/New Hardware	Porsche 911 GT2	Porsche 3.6 L Turbo Flat-6	P	92	(Monaco) Stéphane Ortelli	2–4
(New Zealand) Parr Motorsport/New Hardware	Porsche 911 GT2	Porsche 3.6 L Turbo Flat-6	P	92	(United Kingdom) Robert Nearn	2–4
(New Zealand) Parr Motorsport/New Hardware	Porsche 911 GT2	Porsche 3.6 L Turbo Flat-6	P	92	(New Zealand) Bill Farmer	3
(New Zealand) Parr Motorsport/New Hardware	Porsche 911 GT2	Porsche 3.6 L Turbo Flat-6	P	92	(United States) Andy Pilgrim	4
(New Zealand) Parr Motorsport/New Hardware	Porsche 911 GT2	Porsche 3.6 L Turbo Flat-6	P	92	(Italy) Steffano Buttiero	8
(New Zealand) Parr Motorsport/New Hardware	Porsche 911 GT2	Porsche 3.6 L Turbo Flat-6	P	92	(France) Michel Ligonnet	8
(New Zealand) Parr Motorsport/New Hardware	Porsche 911 GT2	Porsche 3.6 L Turbo Flat-6	P	92	(United Kingdom) David Saunders	8
(New Zealand) Parr Motorsport/New Hardware	Porsche 911 GT2	Porsche 3.6 L Turbo Flat-6	P	93	(United Kingdom) Peter Owen	2, 4–5, 8–10
(New Zealand) Parr Motorsport/New Hardware	Porsche 911 GT2	Porsche 3.6 L Turbo Flat-6	P	93	(United Kingdom) Hugh Price	2, 4–5, 8–10
(New Zealand) Parr Motorsport/New Hardware	Porsche 911 GT2	Porsche 3.6 L Turbo Flat-6	P	93	(United Kingdom) John Robinson	2, 4–5, 8–10
(United Kingdom) TVR	TVR Cerbera	TVR Speed Six 4.5 L I6	D	94	(United Kingdom) Mark Hales	4, 8
(United Kingdom) TVR	TVR Cerbera	TVR Speed Six 4.5 L I6	D	94	(United Kingdom) Phil Andrews	4, 8
(United Kingdom) TVR	TVR Cerbera	TVR Speed Six 4.5 L I6	D	94	(United Kingdom) Dave Loudoun	4
(France) European Luigi Racing	Dodge Viper RT/10	Dodge EWB 8.0 L V10	D	95	(France) Philippe Smaniotto	8–9
(France) European Luigi Racing	Dodge Viper RT/10	Dodge EWB 8.0 L V10	D	95	(Belgium) José Close	8–9
(France) European Luigi Racing	Dodge Viper RT/10	Dodge EWB 8.0 L V10	D	95	(Germany) Wolfgang Haugg	8
(France) European Luigi Racing	Dodge Viper RT/10	Dodge EWB 8.0 L V10	D	95	(Portugal) Manuel Monteiro	11
(France) European Luigi Racing	Dodge Viper RT/10	Dodge EWB 8.0 L V10	D	95	(France) Michel Arnaud	11
(France) European Luigi Racing	Dodge Viper RT/10	Dodge EWB 8.0 L V10	D	95	(Ethiopia) Mohammed Al Sakkaf	11
(France) Larbre Compétition	Porsche 911 GT2	Porsche 3.6 L Turbo Flat-6	M	96	(France) Patrice Goueslard	1–8, 10–11
(France) Larbre Compétition	Porsche 911 GT2	Porsche 3.6 L Turbo Flat-6	M	96	(Germany) André Ahrlé	1–8, 10–11
(France) Larbre Compétition	Porsche 911 GT2	Porsche 3.6 L Turbo Flat-6	M	96	(Monaco) Stéphane Ortelli	1
(France) Larbre Compétition	Porsche 911 GT2	Porsche 3.6 L Turbo Flat-6	M	96	(France) Jack Leconte	2, 10
(France) Larbre Compétition	Porsche 911 GT2	Porsche 3.6 L Turbo Flat-6	M	96	(Belgium) Michel Neugarten	3
(France) Larbre Compétition	Porsche 911 GT2	Porsche 3.6 L Turbo Flat-6	M	96	(France) Jean-Pierre Malcher	4
(France) Larbre Compétition	Porsche 911 GT2	Porsche 3.6 L Turbo Flat-6	M	96	(France) Jean-Luc Chéreau	7
(France) Larbre Compétition	Porsche 911 GT2	Porsche 3.6 L Turbo Flat-6	M	97	(France) Pierre Yver	1
(France) Larbre Compétition	Porsche 911 GT2	Porsche 3.6 L Turbo Flat-6	M	97	(France) Jack Leconte	1
(France) Larbre Compétition	Porsche 911 GT2	Porsche 3.6 L Turbo Flat-6	M	97	(France) Jean-Luc Chéreau	1
(United Kingdom) John Greasley	Porsche 911 GT2	Porsche 3.6 L Turbo Flat-6	P	97; 101	(United Kingdom) John Greasley	4, 8
(United Kingdom) John Greasley	Porsche 911 GT2	Porsche 3.6 L Turbo Flat-6	P	97; 101	(United Kingdom) John Morrison	4, 8
(France) Michel Cottot	Venturi 400GTR	Renault PRV 3.0 L Turbo V6		98	(France) Michel Cottot	1
(France) Michel Cottot	Venturi 400GTR	Renault PRV 3.0 L Turbo V6		98	(France) Philippe Smaniotto	1
(France) Michel Cottot	Venturi 400GTR	Renault PRV 3.0 L Turbo V6		98	(France) Jean-Claude Barthe	1
(France) Jérôme Brarda	Porsche 911 Carrera RS	Porsche 3.8 L Flat-6	P	98; 100	(France) Jérôme Brarda	4, 8
(France) Jérôme Brarda	Porsche 911 Carrera RS	Porsche 3.8 L Flat-6	P	98; 100	(Norway) Erik Henriksen	4, 8
(France) Jérôme Brarda	Porsche 911 Carrera RS	Porsche 3.8 L Flat-6	P	98; 100	(France) Thiérry Guiod	4
(France) Jérôme Brarda	Porsche 911 Carrera RS	Porsche 3.8 L Flat-6	P	98; 100	(France) Gérard Paillet	8
(Switzerland) Elf Haberthur Racing	Porsche 911 GT2	Porsche 3.6 L Turbo Flat-6	P	99	(France) Philippe Charriol	1–4, 11
(Switzerland) Elf Haberthur Racing	Porsche 911 GT2	Porsche 3.6 L Turbo Flat-6	P	99	(France) Ferdinand de Lesseps	1–3, 5–6, 10–11
(Switzerland) Elf Haberthur Racing	Porsche 911 GT2	Porsche 3.6 L Turbo Flat-6	P	99	(France) Richard Balandras	1, 4–6
(Switzerland) Elf Haberthur Racing	Porsche 911 GT2	Porsche 3.6 L Turbo Flat-6	P	99	(Belgium) Michel Neugarten	2, 9–10
(Switzerland) Elf Haberthur Racing	Porsche 911 GT2	Porsche 3.6 L Turbo Flat-6	P	99	(France) Bruno Ilien	3
(Switzerland) Elf Haberthur Racing	Porsche 911 GT2	Porsche 3.6 L Turbo Flat-6	P	99	(France) Stéphane Ratel	7
(Switzerland) Elf Haberthur Racing	Porsche 911 GT2	Porsche 3.6 L Turbo Flat-6	P	99	(France) Michel Ligonnet	7, 10
(Switzerland) Elf Haberthur Racing	Porsche 911 GT2	Porsche 3.6 L Turbo Flat-6	P	99	(Japan) Masahiro Kimoto	7
(Switzerland) Elf Haberthur Racing	Porsche 911 GT2	Porsche 3.6 L Turbo Flat-6	P	99	(Belgium) Frédéric Bouvy	9
(Switzerland) Elf Haberthur Racing	Porsche 911 GT2	Porsche 3.6 L Turbo Flat-6	P	99	(Switzerland) Loris Kessel	9
(Switzerland) Elf Haberthur Racing	Porsche 911 GT2	Porsche 3.6 L Turbo Flat-6	P	99	(Singapore) Georges Ong	11
(Japan) Team Kunimitsu	Honda NSX	Honda C30A 3.0 L V6	Y	100	(Japan) Kunimitsu Takahashi	7
(Japan) Team Kunimitsu	Honda NSX	Honda C30A 3.0 L V6	Y	100	(Japan) Keiichi Tsuchiya	7
(Japan) Team Kunimitsu	Honda NSX	Honda C30A 3.0 L V6	Y	100	(Japan) Ryo Michigami	7
(Belgium) Excelsior	Porsche 911 GT2	Porsche 3.6 L Turbo Flat-6		102	(Belgium) Albert Vanierschot	5
(Belgium) Excelsior	Porsche 911 GT2	Porsche 3.6 L Turbo Flat-6		102	(Belgium) Paul Kumpen	5
(Belgium) Excelsior	Porsche 911 GT2	Porsche 3.6 L Turbo Flat-6		102	(Belgium) Franco La Rosa	5
(Germany) Repsol Kremer	Porsche 911 GT2	Porsche 3.6 L Turbo Flat-6	G	105	(Spain) Alfonso de Orléans-Borbón	5, 8
(Germany) Repsol Kremer	Porsche 911 GT2	Porsche 3.6 L Turbo Flat-6	G	105	(Spain) Andrés Vilariño	5
(Germany) Repsol Kremer	Porsche 911 GT2	Porsche 3.6 L Turbo Flat-6	G	105	(Spain) Joaquin Folch	8
(China) Dentro Team Megaspeed	Porsche 911 GT2	Porsche 3.6 L Turbo Flat-6		108	(Hong Kong) Philip Ma	11
(China) Dentro Team Megaspeed	Porsche 911 GT2	Porsche 3.6 L Turbo Flat-6		108	(South Africa) Mark Goddard	11
(China) Dentro Team Megaspeed	Porsche 911 Carrera RS	Porsche 3.8 L Flat-6		109	(Hong Kong) Alex Li	11
(China) Dentro Team Megaspeed	Porsche 911 Carrera RS	Porsche 3.8 L Flat-6		109	(United Kingdom) Brian Whillock	11
(China) Dentro Team Megaspeed	Porsche 911 Carrera RS	Porsche 3.8 L Flat-6		109	(United Kingdom) Michael Pickup	11
(France) Jacques Alméras	Porsche 911 Carrera RSR	Porsche 3.8 L Flat-6		110	(France) Jacques Alméras	10
(France) Jacques Alméras	Porsche 911 Carrera RSR	Porsche 3.8 L Flat-6		110	(France) Jean-Marie Alméras	10
(France) Jacques Alméras	Porsche 911 Carrera RSR	Porsche 3.8 L Flat-6		110	(France) Roland Bervillé	10
(United Kingdom) Chamberlain	Porsche 911 GT2	Porsche 3.6 L Turbo Flat-6		111	(United Kingdom) Gérard MacQuillan	9
(United Kingdom) Chamberlain	Porsche 911 GT2	Porsche 3.6 L Turbo Flat-6		111	(United Kingdom) Geoff Lister	9
(United Kingdom) Chamberlain	Porsche 911 GT2	Porsche 3.6 L Turbo Flat-6		111	(United Kingdom) John Greasley	9
(Hong Kong) Samson Chan	Porsche 911 Carrera RS	Porsche 3.8 L Flat-6		112	(Hong Kong) Samson Chan	11
(Hong Kong) Samson Chan	Porsche 911 Carrera RS	Porsche 3.8 L Flat-6		112	(Hong Kong) Keith Wong	11
(Hong Kong) Samson Chan	Porsche 911 Carrera RS	Porsche 3.8 L Flat-6		112	(United Kingdom) Eric Chan	11
(United Kingdom) Corona Team	Ferrari F355 Challenge	Ferrari F129B 3.5 L V8		113	(Sweden) Tony Ring	11
(United Kingdom) Corona Team	Ferrari F355 Challenge	Ferrari F129B 3.5 L V8		113	(Germany) Peter Worm	11
(United Kingdom) Corona Team	Ferrari F355 Challenge	Ferrari F129B 3.5 L V8		113	(United Kingdom) Ian Ross Geekie	11
(Japan) Nakajima Honda	Honda NSX	Honda 3.0 L V6	B	164	(Japan) Takuya Kurosawa	7
(Japan) Nakajima Honda	Honda NSX	Honda 3.0 L V6	B	164	(Japan) Kouji Satou	7
(Japan) Nakajima Honda	Honda NSX	Honda 3.0 L V6	B	164	(Japan) Toranosuke Takagi	7
(Japan) Keep The Dream Alive Racing Team	Porsche 911 GT2	Porsche 3.6 L Turbo Flat-6	D	911	(Japan) Kenji Kawagoe	7
(Japan) Keep The Dream Alive Racing Team	Porsche 911 GT2	Porsche 3.6 L Turbo Flat-6	D	911	(Japan) Syunji Kasuya	7
(Japan) Keep The Dream Alive Racing Team	Porsche 911 GT2	Porsche 3.6 L Turbo Flat-6	D	911	(Hong Kong) Keith Wong	7

== Season results ==
1996 BPR Kärcher Global Endurance GT Series Results
Rnd	Circuit	GT1 Winning Team	GT2 Winning Team	Results
Rnd	Circuit	GT1 Winning Drivers	GT2 Winning Drivers	Results
1	Paul Ricard	(United Kingdom) #2 Gulf Racing GTC	(Germany) #56 Roock Racing	Results
1	Paul Ricard	(United Kingdom) Ray Bellm (United Kingdom) James Weaver	(Switzerland) Bruno Eichmann (Germany) Ralf Kelleners (Germany) Gerd Ruch	Results
2	Monza	(United Kingdom) #1 West Racing	(Germany) #56 Roock Racing	Results
2	Monza	(Germany) Thomas Bscher (Denmark) John Nielsen	(Switzerland) Bruno Eichmann (Germany) Ralf Kelleners (Germany) Gerd Ruch	Results
3	Jarama	(United Kingdom) #2 Gulf Racing GTC	(Netherlands) #83 Marcos Racing Intl.	Results
3	Jarama	(United Kingdom) Ray Bellm (United Kingdom) James Weaver	(Netherlands) Cor Euser (Brazil) Thomas Erdos	Results
4	Silverstone	(United Kingdom) #3 Harrods Mach One Racing	(Netherlands) #83 Marcos Racing Intl.	Results
4	Silverstone	(United Kingdom) Andy Wallace (France) Olivier Grouillard	(Netherlands) Cor Euser (Brazil) Thomas Erdos	Results
5	Nürburgring	(United Kingdom) #1 West Racing	(Germany) #56 Roock Racing	Results
5	Nürburgring	(Germany) Thomas Bscher (Netherlands) Peter Kox	(Switzerland) Bruno Eichmann (Germany) Gerd Ruch (Belgium) Michel Neugarten	Results
6	Anderstorp	(Italy) #27 Ennea SRL Igol	(Germany) #56 Roock Racing	Results
6	Anderstorp	(Sweden) Anders Olofsson (Italy) Luciano della Noce	(Switzerland) Bruno Eichmann (Germany) Gerd Ruch (Belgium) Michel Neugarten	Results
7	Suzuka	(United Kingdom) #2 Gulf Racing GTC	(Germany) #56 Roock Racing	Results
7	Suzuka	(United Kingdom) Ray Bellm (United Kingdom) James Weaver (Finland) JJ Lehto	(Switzerland) Bruno Eichmann (Germany) Ralf Kelleners (Germany) Gerd Ruch	Results
8	Brands Hatch	(Germany) #35 Porsche AG	(Austria) #88 Konrad Motorsport	Results
8	Brands Hatch	(Germany) Hans-Joachim Stuck (Belgium) Thierry Boutsen	(Austria) Franz Konrad (France) Bob Wollek (France) Stéphane Ortelli	Results
9	Spa-Francorchamps	(Germany) #35 Porsche AG	(Germany) #56 Roock Racing	Results
9	Spa-Francorchamps	(Germany) Hans-Joachim Stuck (Belgium) Thierry Boutsen	(Switzerland) Bruno Eichmann (Germany) Ralf Kelleners (Germany) Gerd Ruch	Results
10	Nogaro	(United Kingdom) #2 Gulf Racing GTC	(Austria) #88 Konrad Motorsport	Results
10	Nogaro	(United Kingdom) Ray Bellm (United Kingdom) James Weaver	(Austria) Franz Konrad (France) Bob Wollek	Results
11	Zhuhai	(Germany) #36 Porsche AG	(Netherlands) #83 Marcos Racing Intl.	Results
11	Zhuhai	(Germany) Ralf Kelleners (France) Emmanuel Collard	(Netherlands) Cor Euser (Netherlands) Hans Tepas (Indonesia) Chandra Alim	Results

=== Non-Championship events ===
Following the conclusion of the season in November, two exhibition races were held in Brazil for BPR competitors.

Date	Event	Circuit	GT1 Winning Team	GT2 Winning Team	Results
Date	Event	Circuit	GT1 Winning Drivers	GT2 Winning Drivers	Results
8 December	2 Hours Curitiba	Curitiba	(Germany) #01 BMW Motorsport	(France) #96 Larbre Compétition	Results
8 December	2 Hours Curitiba	Curitiba	(Brazil) Nelson Piquet (Venezuela) Johnny Cecotto	(France) Patrice Goueslard (France) Christophe Bouchut	Results
16 December	2 Hours of Brasília	Brasília	(Germany) #01 BMW Motorsport	(Germany) #106 Roock Racing	Results
16 December	2 Hours of Brasília	Brasília	(Brazil) Nelson Piquet (Venezuela) Johnny Cecotto	(France) Michel Ligonnet (United States) Andy Pilgrim	Results

== Bibliography ==
- Jean-Marc Teissèdre & Michael Cotton (1997). GT Endurance 1996. IHM Publishing. ISBN 978-2930120119.
