= 2000 1000 km of Nürburgring =

Sports car endurance race in Germany

Nürburgring (1995–2001)

The 2000 Bitburger / AvD 1000 km of Nürburgring was the fourth round of the 2000 American Le Mans Series season. It took place at the Nürburgring, Germany, on July 9, 2000.

This was the second European round of the American Le Mans Series season. It, along with the Silverstone 500, served as a precursor to the creation of the European Le Mans Series. It gauged the willingness of European teams from the FIA Sportscar Championship and FIA GT Championship to participate in a series identical to the American Le Mans Series.

This was the first planned 1000 km event at the Nürburgring since 1988, although the World Sportscar Championship had run shorter events until 1991.

== Race results ==
Class winners in bold.

Pos	Class	No	Team	Drivers	Chassis	Tyre	Laps
Pos	Class	No	Team	Drivers	Engine	Tyre	Laps
1	**LMP**	**1**	**(United States) Panoz Motor Sports**	**(Australia) David Brabham (Denmark) Jan Magnussen**	**Panoz LMP-1 Roadster-S**	MI	**185**
1	**LMP**	**1**	**(United States) Panoz Motor Sports**	**(Australia) David Brabham (Denmark) Jan Magnussen**	**Élan 6L8 6.0 L V8**	MI	**185**
2	LMP	42	(Germany) BMW Motorsport (Germany) Schnitzer Motorsport	(Germany) Jörg Müller (Finland) JJ Lehto	BMW V12 LMR	MI	185
2	LMP	42	(Germany) BMW Motorsport (Germany) Schnitzer Motorsport	(Germany) Jörg Müller (Finland) JJ Lehto	BMW S70 6.0 L V12	MI	185
3	LMP	78	(Germany) Audi Sport North America	(Germany) Frank Biela (Italy) Emanuele Pirro	Audi R8	MI	182
3	LMP	78	(Germany) Audi Sport North America	(Germany) Frank Biela (Italy) Emanuele Pirro	Audi 3.6 L Turbo V8	MI	182
4	LMP	2	(United States) Panoz Motor Sports	(United States) Johnny O'Connell (Japan) Hiroki Katou (Germany) Klaus Graf	Panoz LMP-1 Roadster-S	MI	181
4	LMP	2	(United States) Panoz Motor Sports	(United States) Johnny O'Connell (Japan) Hiroki Katou (Germany) Klaus Graf	Élan 6L8 6.0 L V8	MI	181
5	LMP	32	(France) Motorola DAMS	(Belgium) Marc Goossens (France) Franck Montagny	Cadillac Northstar LMP	P	181
5	LMP	32	(France) Motorola DAMS	(Belgium) Marc Goossens (France) Franck Montagny	Cadillac Northstar 4.0 L Turbo V8	P	181
6	LMP	53	(France) Racing Organisation Course	(Germany) Ralf Kelleners (France) Jérôme Policand	Reynard 2KQ-LM	MI	180
6	LMP	53	(France) Racing Organisation Course	(Germany) Ralf Kelleners (France) Jérôme Policand	Volkswagen 2.0 L Turbo I4	MI	180
7	LMP	18	(Monaco) GLV Racing	(Italy) Giovanni Lavaggi (Argentina) Nicolás Filiberti	Ferrari 333 SP	G	177
7	LMP	18	(Monaco) GLV Racing	(Italy) Giovanni Lavaggi (Argentina) Nicolás Filiberti	Ferrari F310E 4.0 L V12	G	177
8	**GTS**	**91**	**(France) Viper Team Oreca**	**(Monaco) Olivier Beretta (Austria) Karl Wendlinger (Belgium) Marc Duez**	**Dodge Viper GTS-R**	MI	**175**
8	**GTS**	**91**	**(France) Viper Team Oreca**	**(Monaco) Olivier Beretta (Austria) Karl Wendlinger (Belgium) Marc Duez**	**Dodge 8.0 L V10**	MI	**175**
9	LMP	54	(France) Racing Organisation Course	(France) Jean-Christophe Boullion (Spain) Jordi Gené	Reynard 2KQ-LM	MI	174
9	LMP	54	(France) Racing Organisation Course	(France) Jean-Christophe Boullion (Spain) Jordi Gené	Volkswagen 2.0 L Turbo I4	MI	174
10	LMP	43	(Germany) BMW Motorsport (Germany) Schnitzer Motorsport	(France) Jean-Marc Gounon (United States) Bill Auberlen	BMW V12 LMR	MI	170
10	LMP	43	(Germany) BMW Motorsport (Germany) Schnitzer Motorsport	(France) Jean-Marc Gounon (United States) Bill Auberlen	BMW S70 6.0 L V12	MI	170
11	**GT**	**5**	**(United States) Dick Barbour Racing**	**(Germany) Dirk Müller (Germany) Lucas Luhr**	**Porsche 911 GT3-R**	MI	**169**
11	**GT**	**5**	**(United States) Dick Barbour Racing**	**(Germany) Dirk Müller (Germany) Lucas Luhr**	**Porsche 3.6 L Flat-6**	MI	**169**
12	GT	70	(Australia) Skea Racing International	(United Kingdom) Johnny Mowlem (United States) David Murry	Porsche 911 GT3-R	P	167
12	GT	70	(Australia) Skea Racing International	(United Kingdom) Johnny Mowlem (United States) David Murry	Porsche 3.6 L Flat-6	P	167
13	GT	21	(United States) MCR/Aspen Knolls	(United States) Shane Lewis (United States) Cort Wagner	Porsche 911 GT3-R	P	164
13	GT	21	(United States) MCR/Aspen Knolls	(United States) Shane Lewis (United States) Cort Wagner	Porsche 3.6 L Flat-6	P	164
14	LMP	99	(France) PiR Competition	(France) Pierre Bruneau (France) Marc Rostan	Debora LMP299	A	164
14	LMP	99	(France) PiR Competition	(France) Pierre Bruneau (France) Marc Rostan	BMW 3.0L I6	A	164
15	GT	10	(United States) Prototype Technology Group	(United States) Peter Cunningham (United States) Brian Cunningham (Sweden) Niclas Jönsson	BMW M3	Y	163
15	GT	10	(United States) Prototype Technology Group	(United States) Peter Cunningham (United States) Brian Cunningham (Sweden) Niclas Jönsson	BMW 3.2 L I6	Y	163
16 DNF	LMP	31	(France) Motorola DAMS	(France) Emmanuel Collard (France) Éric Bernard	Cadillac Northstar LMP	P	161
16 DNF	LMP	31	(France) Motorola DAMS	(France) Emmanuel Collard (France) Éric Bernard	Cadillac Northstar 4.0 L Turbo V8	P	161
17	GTS	61	(United Kingdom) Chamberlain Motorsport	(France) Xavier Pompidou (Brazil) Thomas Erdos (South Africa) Stephen Watson	Chrysler Viper GTS-R	MI	160
17	GTS	61	(United Kingdom) Chamberlain Motorsport	(France) Xavier Pompidou (Brazil) Thomas Erdos (South Africa) Stephen Watson	Chrysler 8.0 L V10	MI	160
18	GT	22	(United States) Alex Job Racing	(United States) Mike Fitzgerald (United States) Bob Nagel (United States) Peter Argetsinger	Porsche 911 GT3-R	MI	160
18	GT	22	(United States) Alex Job Racing	(United States) Mike Fitzgerald (United States) Bob Nagel (United States) Peter Argetsinger	Porsche 3.6 L Flat-6	MI	160
19	GT	6	(United States) Prototype Technology Group	(United States) Johannes van Overbeek (United States) Boris Said (Germany) Hans-Joachim Stuck	BMW M3	Y	160
19	GT	6	(United States) Prototype Technology Group	(United States) Johannes van Overbeek (United States) Boris Said (Germany) Hans-Joachim Stuck	BMW 3.2 L I6	Y	160
20	GT	52	(Germany) Seikel Motorsport	(Canada) Tony Burgess (Italy) Gabrio Rosa (Italy) Stefano Buttiero	Porsche 911 GT3-R	D	160
20	GT	52	(Germany) Seikel Motorsport	(Canada) Tony Burgess (Italy) Gabrio Rosa (Italy) Stefano Buttiero	Porsche 3.6 L Flat-6	D	160
21	GTS	08	(United States) Roock Motorsport North America	(United States) Zak Brown (United States) Vic Rice (Germany) Hubert Haupt	Porsche 911 GT2	Y	158
21	GTS	08	(United States) Roock Motorsport North America	(United States) Zak Brown (United States) Vic Rice (Germany) Hubert Haupt	Porsche 3.8 L Turbo Flat-6	Y	158
22	GT	71	(Australia) Skea Racing International	(Australia) Rohan Skea (United States) Doc Bundy (United States) Grady Willingham	Porsche 911 GT3-R	P	154
22	GT	71	(Australia) Skea Racing International	(Australia) Rohan Skea (United States) Doc Bundy (United States) Grady Willingham	Porsche 3.6 L Flat-6	P	154
23	GTS	35	(Germany) Proton Competition	(Germany) Gerold Ried (Germany) Christian Ried	Porsche 911 GT2	Y	152
23	GTS	35	(Germany) Proton Competition	(Germany) Gerold Ried (Germany) Christian Ried	Porsche 3.6 L Turbo Flat-6	Y	152
24	LMP	36	(United States) Johansson-Matthews Racing	(Sweden) Stefan Johansson (United Kingdom) Guy Smith	Reynard 2KQ-LM	Y	150
24	LMP	36	(United States) Johansson-Matthews Racing	(Sweden) Stefan Johansson (United Kingdom) Guy Smith	Judd GV4 4.0 L V10	Y	150
25	GT	69	(Canada) Kyser Racing	(Canada) Kye Wankum (Canada) Greg Doff (Germany) Georg Silbermayr	Porsche 911 GT3-R	P	147
25	GT	69	(Canada) Kyser Racing	(Canada) Kye Wankum (Canada) Greg Doff (Germany) Georg Silbermayr	Porsche 3.6 L Flat-6	P	147
26	GT	9	(Germany) Roock Motorsport North America (United Kingdom) Cirtek Motorsport	(Germany) André Ahrlé (Germany) Michael Eschmann (Germany) Jürgen Lorenz	Porsche 911 GT3-R	D	116
26	GT	9	(Germany) Roock Motorsport North America (United Kingdom) Cirtek Motorsport	(Germany) André Ahrlé (Germany) Michael Eschmann (Germany) Jürgen Lorenz	Porsche 3.6 L Flat-6	D	116
27 DNF	GTS	92	(France) Viper Team Oreca	(United States) David Donohue (United States) Tommy Archer (France) Jean-Philippe Belloc	Dodge Viper GTS-R	MI	91
27 DNF	GTS	92	(France) Viper Team Oreca	(United States) David Donohue (United States) Tommy Archer (France) Jean-Philippe Belloc	Dodge 8.0 L V10	MI	91
28 DNF	LMP	02	(Germany) Pole Team	(Germany) Norman Simon (Germany) Günther Blieninger (United States) Mark Simo	Riley & Scott Mk III	MI	90
28 DNF	LMP	02	(Germany) Pole Team	(Germany) Norman Simon (Germany) Günther Blieninger (United States) Mark Simo	Judd GV4 4.0 L V10	MI	90
29 DNF	GT	23	(United States) Alex Job Racing	(United States) Randy Pobst (Belgium) Bruno Lambert	Porsche 911 GT3-R	MI	87
29 DNF	GT	23	(United States) Alex Job Racing	(United States) Randy Pobst (Belgium) Bruno Lambert	Porsche 3.6 L Flat-6	MI	87
30 DNF	LMP	77	(Germany) Audi Sport North America	(Italy) Rinaldo Capello (United Kingdom) Allan McNish	Audi R8	MI	84
30 DNF	LMP	77	(Germany) Audi Sport North America	(Italy) Rinaldo Capello (United Kingdom) Allan McNish	Audi 3.6 L Turbo V8	MI	84
31 DNF	GT	56	(France) Noël del Bello Racing	(France) Noël del Bello (France) Marc Sourd (France) Roland Bervillé	Porsche 911 GT3-R	D	78
31 DNF	GT	56	(France) Noël del Bello Racing	(France) Noël del Bello (France) Marc Sourd (France) Roland Bervillé	Porsche 3.6 L Flat-6	D	78
32 DNF	LMP	25	(Italy) Conrero	(Italy) Beppe Gabbiani (Italy) Angelo Lancelotti (Bolivia) Felipe Ortiz	Riley & Scott Mk III	G	71
32 DNF	LMP	25	(Italy) Conrero	(Italy) Beppe Gabbiani (Italy) Angelo Lancelotti (Bolivia) Felipe Ortiz	Ford Cosworth 4.0 L V8	G	71
33 DNF	GT	51	(United States) Dick Barbour Racing	(Germany) Sascha Maassen (France) Bob Wollek	Porsche 911 GT3-R	MI	52
33 DNF	GT	51	(United States) Dick Barbour Racing	(Germany) Sascha Maassen (France) Bob Wollek	Porsche 3.6 L Flat-6	MI	52
34 DNF	LMP	17	(France) SMG	(France) Philippe Gache (France) Didier Cottaz	Courage C60	P	44
34 DNF	LMP	17	(France) SMG	(France) Philippe Gache (France) Didier Cottaz	Judd GV4 4.0 L V10	P	44
35 DNF	LMP	24	(United Kingdom) Team Ascari	(Netherlands) Klaas Zwart (South Africa) Werner Lupberger (Belgium) Jeffrey van Hooydonck	Ascari A410	P	41
35 DNF	LMP	24	(United Kingdom) Team Ascari	(Netherlands) Klaas Zwart (South Africa) Werner Lupberger (Belgium) Jeffrey van Hooydonck	Judd GV4 4.0 L V10	P	41
36 DNF	GTS	33	(Germany) Konrad Motorsport	(Austria) Manfred Jurasz (Belgium) Michel Neugarten (United States) Charles Slater	Porsche 911 GT2	D	40
36 DNF	GTS	33	(Germany) Konrad Motorsport	(Austria) Manfred Jurasz (Belgium) Michel Neugarten (United States) Charles Slater	Porsche 3.8 L Turbo Flat-6	D	40
37 DNF	LMP	20	(Germany) Kremer Racing	(France) Christophe Bouchut (Germany) Christian Gläsel	Lola B98/K2000	G	23
37 DNF	LMP	20	(Germany) Kremer Racing	(France) Christophe Bouchut (Germany) Christian Gläsel	Ford (Roush) 6.0 L V8	G	23
38 DNF	LMP	28	(Germany) Konrad Motorsport	(Austria) Franz Konrad (Switzerland) Enzo Calderari (Switzerland) Lilian Bryner	Lola B2K/10	D	2
38 DNF	LMP	28	(Germany) Konrad Motorsport	(Austria) Franz Konrad (Switzerland) Enzo Calderari (Switzerland) Lilian Bryner	Ford (Roush) 6.0 L V8	D	2

== Statistics ==
- Pole Position - #77 Audi Sport North America - 1:27.938
- Fastest Lap - #78 Audi Sport North America - 1:30.418
- Distance - 842.860 km
- Average Speed - 146.190 km/h

American Le Mans Series
Previous race: 2000 Silverstone 500 USA Challenge	2000 season	Next race: 2000 Grand Prix of Sonoma
