= 1996 BPR 4 Hours of Nogaro =

Layout of the Circuit Paul Armagnac Nogaro

The 1996 BPR 4 Hours of Nogaro was the tenth round of the 1996 BPR Global GT Series season. It was run at the Circuit Paul Armagnac Nogaro on 6 October 1996.

== Official results ==
Class winners in bold. Cars failing to complete 75% of winner's distance marked as Not Classified (NC).

Pos	Class	No	Team	Drivers	Chassis	Tyre	Laps
Pos	Class	No	Team	Drivers	Engine	Tyre	Laps
1	**GT1**	**2**	**(United Kingdom) Gulf Racing** **(United Kingdom) GTC Competition**	**(United Kingdom) James Weaver** **(United Kingdom) Ray Bellm**	**McLaren F1 GTR**	**MI**	**154**
1	**GT1**	**2**	**(United Kingdom) Gulf Racing** **(United Kingdom) GTC Competition**	**(United Kingdom) James Weaver** **(United Kingdom) Ray Bellm**	**BMW S70 6.1L V12**	**MI**	**154**
2	GT1	6	(United Kingdom) Gulf Racing (United Kingdom) GTC Competition	(France) Pierre-Henri Raphanel (United Kingdom) Lindsay Owen-Jones	McLaren F1 GTR	**MI**	154
2	GT1	6	(United Kingdom) Gulf Racing (United Kingdom) GTC Competition	(France) Pierre-Henri Raphanel (United Kingdom) Lindsay Owen-Jones	BMW S70 6.1L V12	**MI**	154
3	GT1	40	(France) Pilot Racing	(France) Michel Ferté (France) Olivier Thévenin	Ferrari F40 LM	**MI**	153
3	GT1	40	(France) Pilot Racing	(France) Michel Ferté (France) Olivier Thévenin	Ferrari F120B 3.0 L Turbo V8	**MI**	153
4	GT1	27	(Italy) Ennea Igol	(Sweden) Anders Olofsson (Italy) Luciano della Noce (Italy) Max Angelelli	Ferrari F40 GTE	**P**	153
4	GT1	27	(Italy) Ennea Igol	(Sweden) Anders Olofsson (Italy) Luciano della Noce (Italy) Max Angelelli	Ferrari F120B 3.5L Turbo V8	**P**	153
5	**GT2**	**88**	**(Austria) Konrad Motorsport**	**(France) Bob Wollek** **(Austria) Franz Konrad**	**Porsche 911 GT2**	**MI**	**151**
5	**GT2**	**88**	**(Austria) Konrad Motorsport**	**(France) Bob Wollek** **(Austria) Franz Konrad**	**Porsche 3.6 L Turbo Flat-6**	**MI**	**151**
6	GT1	17	(France) Viper Team Oreca	(France) Philippe Gache (France) Éric Hélary	Chrysler Viper GTS-R	**MI**	151
6	GT1	17	(France) Viper Team Oreca	(France) Philippe Gache (France) Éric Hélary	Chrysler 8.0L V10	**MI**	151
7	GT2	56	(Germany) Roock Racing	(Germany) Gerd Ruch (Switzerland) Bruno Eichmann (Germany) Ralf Kelleners	Porsche 911 GT2	**MI**	151
7	GT2	56	(Germany) Roock Racing	(Germany) Gerd Ruch (Switzerland) Bruno Eichmann (Germany) Ralf Kelleners	Porsche 3.6L Turbo Flat-6	**MI**	151
8	GT1	32	(France) Viper Team Oreca	(Monaco) Olivier Beretta (France) Dominique Dupuy	Chrysler Viper GTS-R	**MI**	151
8	GT1	32	(France) Viper Team Oreca	(Monaco) Olivier Beretta (France) Dominique Dupuy	Chrysler 8.0L V10	**MI**	151
9	GT2	96	(France) Larbre Compétition	(France) Patrice Goueslard (Germany) André Ahrlé (France) Jack Leconte	Porsche 911 GT2	**MI**	148
9	GT2	96	(France) Larbre Compétition	(France) Patrice Goueslard (Germany) André Ahrlé (France) Jack Leconte	Porsche 3.6 L Turbo Flat-6	**MI**	148
10	GT1	21	(United Kingdom) Lotus Racing Team	(Netherlands) Mike Hezemans (United Kingdom) Alex Portman	Lotus Esprit V8	**MI**	147
10	GT1	21	(United Kingdom) Lotus Racing Team	(Netherlands) Mike Hezemans (United Kingdom) Alex Portman	Lotus 3.5L Turbo V8	**MI**	147
11	GT2	55	(Switzerland) Stadler Motorsport	(Switzerland) Lilian Bryner (Switzerland) Enzo Calderari	Porsche 911 GT2	**P**	145
11	GT2	55	(Switzerland) Stadler Motorsport	(Switzerland) Lilian Bryner (Switzerland) Enzo Calderari	Porsche 3.6L Turbo Flat-6	**P**	145
12	GT2	52	(Germany) Krauß Rennsporttechnik	(Germany) Bernhard Müller (Germany) Michael Trunk	Porsche 911 GT2	**P**	145
12	GT2	52	(Germany) Krauß Rennsporttechnik	(Germany) Bernhard Müller (Germany) Michael Trunk	Porsche 3.6L Turbo Flat-6	**P**	145
13	GT2	99	(Switzerland) Elf Haberthur Racing	(France) Ferdinand de Lesseps (France) Michel Ligonnet (Belgium) Michel Neugarten	Porsche 911 GT2	**P**	145
13	GT2	99	(Switzerland) Elf Haberthur Racing	(France) Ferdinand de Lesseps (France) Michel Ligonnet (Belgium) Michel Neugarten	Porsche 3.6L Turbo Flat-6	**P**	145
14	GT2	93	(United Kingdom) Parr Motorsport (United Kingdom) New Hardware	(United Kingdom) Hugh Price (Germany) John Robinson (United Kingdom) Peter Owen	Porsche 911 GT2	**P**	144
14	GT2	93	(United Kingdom) Parr Motorsport (United Kingdom) New Hardware	(United Kingdom) Hugh Price (Germany) John Robinson (United Kingdom) Peter Owen	Porsche 3.6L Turbo Flat-6	**P**	144
15	GT2	69	(Germany) Proton Competition	(France) Patrick Vuillaume (Germany) Gerold Ried	Porsche 911 GT2	**P**	143
15	GT2	69	(Germany) Proton Competition	(France) Patrick Vuillaume (Germany) Gerold Ried	Porsche 3.6L Turbo Flat-6	**P**	143
16	GT1	43	(France) JCB Racing	(France) Jean-Claude Basso (France) Henri Pescarolo (France) Jean-Louis Ricci	Venturi 600LM	**D**	139
16	GT1	43	(France) JCB Racing	(France) Jean-Claude Basso (France) Henri Pescarolo (France) Jean-Louis Ricci	Renault PRV 3.0 L Turbo V6	**D**	139
17	GT2	110	(France) Jacques Alméras	(France) Jacques Alméras (France) Jean-Marie Alméras (France) Roland Bervillé	Porsche 911 Carrera RSR	?	138
17	GT2	110	(France) Jacques Alméras	(France) Jacques Alméras (France) Jean-Marie Alméras (France) Roland Bervillé	Porsche 3.8 L Flat-6	?	138
18	GT2	73	(United Kingdom) Charles Morgan	(United Kingdom) Charles Morgan (United Kingdom) William Wykeham	Morgan Plus 8 GTR	**D**	136
18	GT2	73	(United Kingdom) Charles Morgan	(United Kingdom) Charles Morgan (United Kingdom) William Wykeham	Rover 5.0L V8	**D**	136
19	GT1	16	(Austria) Karl Augustin	(Austria) Karl Augustin (Germany) Ernst Gschwender (Austria) Horst Felbermayr	Porsche 911 Carrera Cup	**P**	132
19	GT1	16	(Austria) Karl Augustin	(Austria) Karl Augustin (Germany) Ernst Gschwender (Austria) Horst Felbermayr	Porsche 3.6L Turbo Flat-6	**P**	132
20 DNF	GT1	39	(France) RJ Racing	(France) Stéphane Daoudi (France) Marc Sourd	Renault Sport Spider V6	**P**	104
20 DNF	GT1	39	(France) RJ Racing	(France) Stéphane Daoudi (France) Marc Sourd	Renault PRV 3.0 L Turbo V6	**P**	104
21 DNF	GT2	65	(Germany) Roock Racing	(Italy) Stefano Buttiero (Germany) Claudia Hürtgen (Italy) Gabriele Marotta	Porsche 911 GT2	**MI**	84
21 DNF	GT2	65	(Germany) Roock Racing	(Italy) Stefano Buttiero (Germany) Claudia Hürtgen (Italy) Gabriele Marotta	Porsche 3.6L Turbo Flat-6	**MI**	84
22 DNF	GT2	107	(Austria) Konrad Motorsport	(Switzerland) Toni Seiler (Germany) Wido Rössler	Porsche 911 GT2	**MI**	69
22 DNF	GT2	107	(Austria) Konrad Motorsport	(Switzerland) Toni Seiler (Germany) Wido Rössler	Porsche 3.6L Turbo Flat-6	**MI**	69
23 DNF	GT1	22	(United Kingdom) Lotus Racing Team	(Netherlands) Jan Lammers (France) Fabien Giroix	Lotus Esprit V8	**MI**	52
23 DNF	GT1	22	(United Kingdom) Lotus Racing Team	(Netherlands) Jan Lammers (France) Fabien Giroix	Lotus Type-918 3.5L Turbo V8	**MI**	52
24 DNF	GT2	87	(Germany) RWS-Brun Motorsport	(Italy) Raffaele Sangiuolo (Austria) Hans-Jörg Hofer (Germany) Gottfried Rampl	Porsche 911 GT2	**P**	43
24 DNF	GT2	87	(Germany) RWS-Brun Motorsport	(Italy) Raffaele Sangiuolo (Austria) Hans-Jörg Hofer (Germany) Gottfried Rampl	Porsche 3.6 L Turbo Flat-6	**P**	43
25 DNF	GT2	91	(France) V de V Racing Team	(France) Eric van de Vyver (France) Jérôme Policand	Gillet Vertigo V de V	**MI**	34
25 DNF	GT2	91	(France) V de V Racing Team	(France) Eric van de Vyver (France) Jérôme Policand	Ford Cosworth 2.0 L Turbo I4	**MI**	34
26 DNF	GT2	64	(United Kingdom) Lanzante Motorsport	(United Kingdom) Soames Langton (United States) Paul Burdell (United Kingdom) Mark Hales	Porsche 911 GT2	**MI**	33
26 DNF	GT2	64	(United Kingdom) Lanzante Motorsport	(United Kingdom) Soames Langton (United States) Paul Burdell (United Kingdom) Mark Hales	Porsche 3.6L Turbo Flat-6	**MI**	33
27 DNF	GT2	106	(Germany) Roock Racing	(France) Jean-Pierre Jarier (France) François Lafon (France) Jean-Marc Smadja	Porsche 911 GT2	**MI**	23
27 DNF	GT2	106	(Germany) Roock Racing	(France) Jean-Pierre Jarier (France) François Lafon (France) Jean-Marc Smadja	Porsche 3.6L Turbo Flat-6	**MI**	23
28 DNF	GT2	59	(France) Raymond Touroul	(France) Didier Ortion (France) Raymond Touroul (France) François Jakubowski	Porsche 993 Carrera Cup	**MI**	19
28 DNF	GT2	59	(France) Raymond Touroul	(France) Didier Ortion (France) Raymond Touroul (France) François Jakubowski	Porsche 3.8L Flat-6	**MI**	19
29 DNF	GT1	8	(France) BBA Compétition	(France) Jean-Luc Maury-Laribière (France) Marcel Tarrès (France) Olivier Grouillard	McLaren F1 GTR	**D**	10
29 DNF	GT1	8	(France) BBA Compétition	(France) Jean-Luc Maury-Laribière (France) Marcel Tarrès (France) Olivier Grouillard	BMW S70 6.1L V12	**D**	10
30 DNF	GT1	28	(Italy) Ennea Igol	(France) Jean-Marc Gounon (France) Éric Bernard (France) Paul Belmondo	Ferrari F40 GTE	**P**	145
30 DNF	GT1	28	(Italy) Ennea Igol	(France) Jean-Marc Gounon (France) Éric Bernard (France) Paul Belmondo	Ferrari F120B 3.5L Turbo V8	**P**	145
31 DNF	GT2	83	(Netherlands) Marcos Racing International	(Netherlands) Cor Euser (Brazil) Thomas Erdos	Marcos LM600	**D**	137
31 DNF	GT2	83	(Netherlands) Marcos Racing International	(Netherlands) Cor Euser (Brazil) Thomas Erdos	Chevrolet 6.0L V8	**D**	137
32 DNF	GT1	1	(United Kingdom) West Competition (United Kingdom) David Price Racing	(Netherlands) Peter Kox (Germany) Thomas Bscher	McLaren F1 GTR	**MI**	0
32 DNF	GT1	1	(United Kingdom) West Competition (United Kingdom) David Price Racing	(Netherlands) Peter Kox (Germany) Thomas Bscher	BMW S70 6.1L V12	**MI**	0
DNS	GT2	77	(Germany) Seikel Motorsport	(Austria) Manfred Jurasz (Germany) Peter Seikel (France) Jacques Corbet	Porsche 911 GT2	**P**	0
DNS	GT2	77	(Germany) Seikel Motorsport	(Austria) Manfred Jurasz (Germany) Peter Seikel (France) Jacques Corbet	Porsche 3.6L Turbo Flat-6	**P**	0

== Statistics ==
- Pole Position - (France) Jean-Marc Gounon (#28 Ennea Igol) - 1:27.535
- Fastest Lap - (France) Jean-Marc Gounon (#28 Ennea Igol) - 1:28.218

BPR Global GT Series
Previous race: Spa	1996 season	Next race: Zhuhai
