= Tony Ring =

Swedish politician (born 1964)

Chairman of the municipal board
- Incumbent
- Assumed office 1 January 2019
- Preceded by: Sven-Olov Axelsson

Personal details
- Born: 3 March 1964 (age 62) Karlskoga, Sweden
- Party: Moderate Party
- Occupation: Politician

Nils Tony Ring (Swedish pronunciation: [toːnyː riːŋ]; born 3 March 1964), is a Swedish politician and former racing driver who is serving as the chairman of the municipal board in Karlskoga Municipality. He is a member of the Moderate Party.

Between 2014 and 2018 he was the leader of the opposition in Karlskoga. He was elected chairman of the municipal board following the 2018 election.

In 2020, Ring was listed by Fokus magazine as one of the most powerful people outside of Stockholm.
