= Charriol =

Swiss watch manufacturer

- Type: Privately held
- Industry: Retail
- Founded: 1983; 43 years ago
- Founder: Philippe Charriol
- Headquarters: Geneva, Switzerland
- Key people: Coralie Charriol
- Products: Watches; Jewellery
- Website: www.charriol.com

Charriol is a Swiss watch and jewellery company based in Geneva, Switzerland. It was founded in 1983 by French entrepreneur Philippe Charriol. The company is led by Coralie Charriol.

Charriol produces Swiss-made watches and jewellery, as well as accessories including leather goods and writing instruments, and licenses its brand name.

== History ==
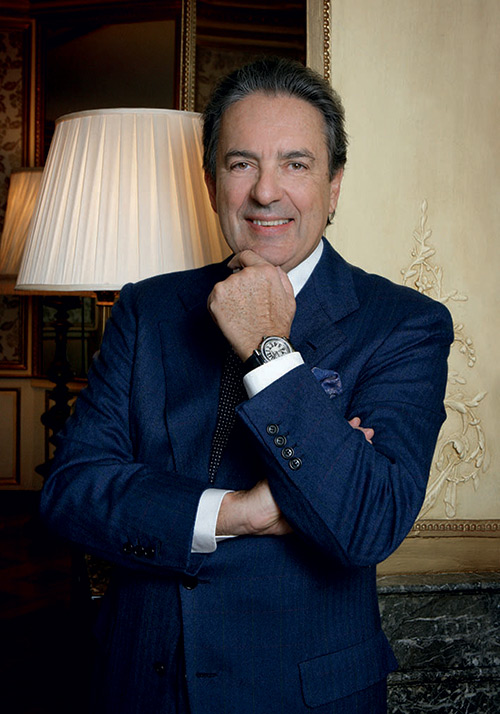
Philippe Charriol

In 1983, Philippe Charriol left his position at Cartier to establish his own watch and jewellery company in Geneva. The company's first collection, introduced the same year, featured a cable motif that later became associated with the brand.

Philippe Charriol died in February 2019 in a racing accident at Circuit Paul Ricard in Le Castellet, France. Later that year, his daughter Coralie Charriol became chairman of the board, and she was appointed CEO in 2020. At the 2023 Watches and Wonders exhibition, she unveiled her first watch collection, the St-Tropez Navigator.

The Philippe Charriol Foundation provides scholarships supporting artists based in Hong Kong.

== Sports sponsorship ==
In 2001, Charriol was the official time-keeper of Lamborghini Super Trofeo. Charriol sponsored World Superbike rider Loris Baz. In 2002, the brand was the official time-keeper of the Andros Trophy. Charriol sponsored driver Christophe Bouchut in 2005. From 2007 to 2008, Charriol was the official sponsor of the Phoenix Suns of the National Basketball Association.

== See also ==
- List of watch manufacturers
- List of Swiss companies
