= Roock Racing =

Roock Racing GmbH
- Company type: Private
- Industry: Automotive
- Founded: 1984
- Headquarters: Leverkusen, Germany
- Key people: Michael Roock, Fabian Roock
- Products: Automobiles
- Website: Roocksport.com

Roock Racing is an auto racing team based in Leverkusen, Germany that was highly successful in numerous sports car and endurance racing series during the 1990s. The team was founded in 1984 by brothers Fabian and Michael Roock.

== 24 Hours of Le Mans ==
Roock Racing's Porsche 911 won the GT2 class at the 1996 24 Hours of Le Mans. The team's winning drivers were Ralf Kelleners, Guy Martinolle and Bruno Eichmann.

At the 1997 24 Hours of Le Mans, Roock's Porsche 911 GT2 driven by André Ahrlé, Andy Pilgrim and Bruno Eichmann finished second in its class, only one lap behind Elf Haberthur Racing's Porsche 911. At the 1998 24 Hours of Le Mans, Roock Racing finished third in the GT2 class. That year's 911 GT2 was driven by Claudia Hürtgen, Michel Ligonnet and Robert Nearn. In 1999, the Roock

Roock Racing's Porsches differed greatly from factory GT2s in order to keep their cars competitive. The cars were developed in-house by Mike Gramke. By 1998, Roock's 911 GT2 sported a 600 HP 3.8 engine, sequential Gemini gearbox, Thielert engine management, repositioned radiators and fuel tank, tracks increased by 7 cm, a lightened and reinforced Matter tub and revised air circulation with specific floors. They are the lightest 993 GT2s ever built and at the 1998 Le Mans race they weighed only 1060 kg.

=== GT2 Racing ===
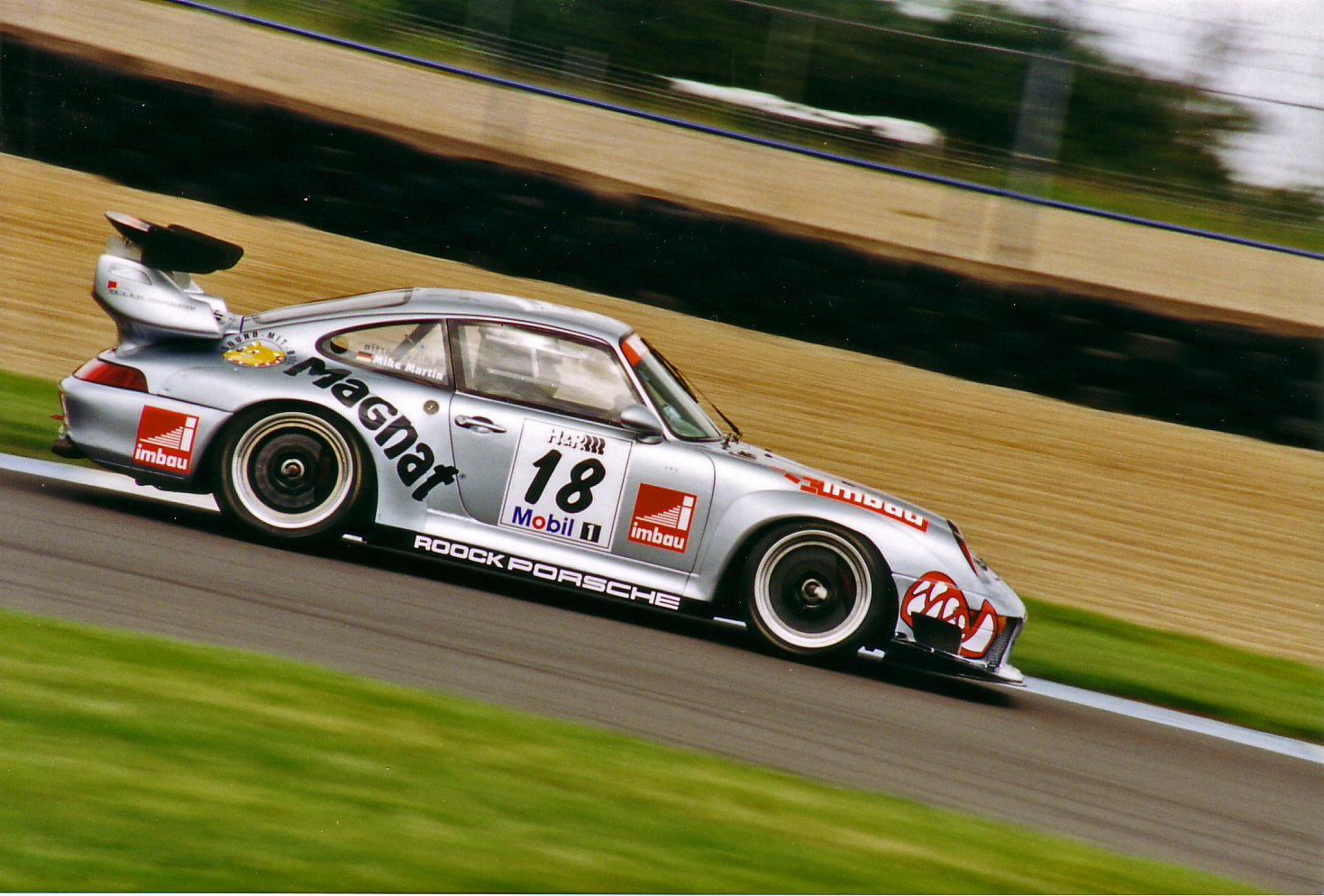
Roock Racing Porsche 911 GT2 at Donington in 1997

Beginning in 1996, Roock Racing joined the BPR Global GT Series and scored several GT2 class wins. That same year was the team's first participation in the 24-hour race at Le Mans, where it won its class.

In 1997, the inaugural season of the FIA GT Championship, Roock's Porsches finished in second and third place in their class at Le Mans. During the 1997 season, the team celebrated four class wins and shared the championship in the GT2 class. In 1998, Roock Racing faced the increasing dominance of the Chrysler Viper GTS-R but could still won a share of the championship.

=== American Le Mans Series ===
In 2000, Roock entered its Porsche GT 2 in the American Le Mans Series, a new race league. In the 2001 season, the team debuted with a Roock Racing Lola B2K/40 in the LMP675 class. There, the team narrowly missed the championship and again finished second in the team standings. Roock Racing ceased its motorsports activities after the 2001 season. Michael Roock formed Roock Sport System GmbH in Germany while Fabian Roock opened Roock Autosport in the U.S.

=== Porsche Carrera Cup ===
Roock began by racing in the Porsche Carrera Cup. In 1993, the team had its first major success as drivers Christian Fittipaldi, Uwe Alzen and Jean-Pierre Jarier won the 24-hour race at Spa-Francorchamps and also won the team title in the Porsche Carrera Cup. In 1994, Roock Racing's Alzen won the 1994 Porsche Supercup. Alzen and Ralf Kelleners also drove for Roock in the ADAC GT Cup. Kelleners secured the championship in 1994 and won the title again in 1995.

== Roock Autosport ==
In 1999, Fabian Roock created Roock Autosport, a tuning company specializing in water-cooled Porsches located in Atlanta, Georgia, North America.

In 2004, Roock Autosport released its Porsche RST 650, a custom Porsche 911. The RST's modified engine produced 650 hp at 6560 rpm and 620 lb.-ft of torque at 4960 rpm. Car and Driver reviewed the RST 650 in its April 2004 issue and gave the car high marks, saying "it's the kind of explosive ferocity you expect 650 horsepower to feel like. And in this case, the high-performance feel translated directly to the test track, where the Roock Porsche posted world-class supercar numbers."

=== Roock RST 650 LM ===
In 2008, Roock announced its newest limited edition tuner Porsche models, the RST 600 LM and RST 650. The 600 LM was designed to commemorate Roock Racing's win at the 1996 24 Hours of Le Mans.

The RST 600 LM and RST 650 included upgraded turbochargers, titanium exhaust systems, and an upgraded ECU good for over 600 horsepower and at least 611 lb-ft torque. Performance numbers were a claimed 3.1 second acceleration to 60 mph and a top speed of 211 mph. Roock also added a carbon fiber clutch, tuned suspension, and massive 380mm drilled and vented brakes. Inside, the RST's Roock RST got carbon fiber trim, oil and temperature gauges, and custom seats with four point harnesses. Finally, subtle exterior modifications were added including a new front splitter, rear diffuser, rear spoiler, and lightweight aluminum racing wheels.
