= Ralf Kelleners =

German racing driver (born 1968)

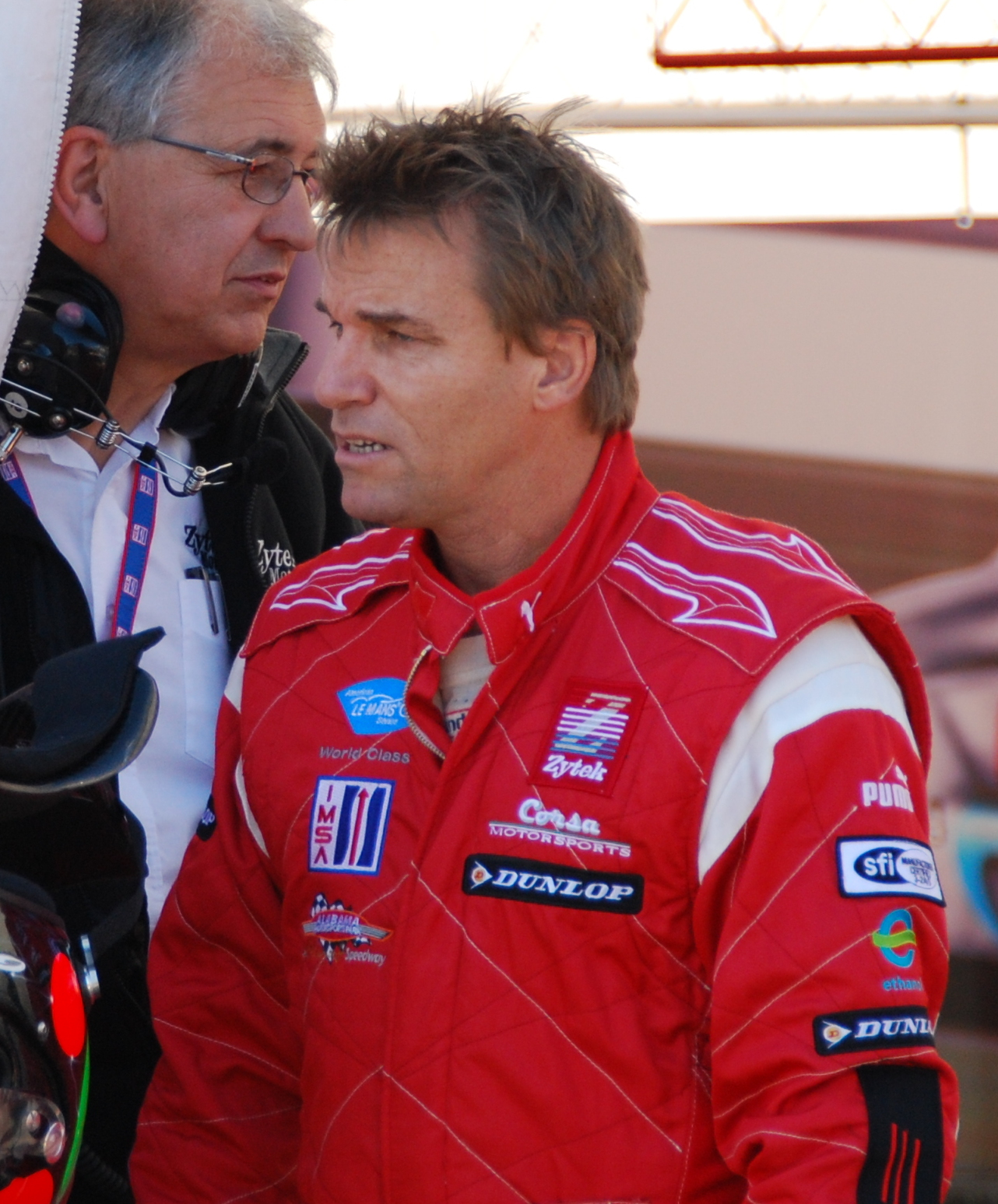
- Kelleners during the 2008 Petit Le Mans
- Nationality: (Germany) German
- Born: 18 May 1968 (age 58) Dinslaken, Germany
- Categorisation: FIA Gold (until 2015); FIA Silver (2016–)

Ralf Kelleners (born 18 May 1968 in Dinslaken) is a racing driver from Germany. Kelleners won the 1996 24 Hours of Le Mans in class alongside Guy Martinoelle and Bruno Eichmann.

His father Helmut Kelleners was also a racing driver, winning the Spa 24 Hours and the 24 Hours Nürburgring.

== Racing career ==
=== 24 Hours of Le Mans ===
Kelleners began racing at Le Mans in 1996 in a Porsche 911 GT2. He ended up winning that race.

=== ALMS and Grand-Am (1999-2008) ===
In 1999, Kelleners went to the U.S. to compete regularly in the U.S. sports car series. He competed in the American Le Mans Series with Champion Racing on a part time basis. In 2000, he began to race simultaneously in the Grand-Am Sports Car Series.

== Racing record ==
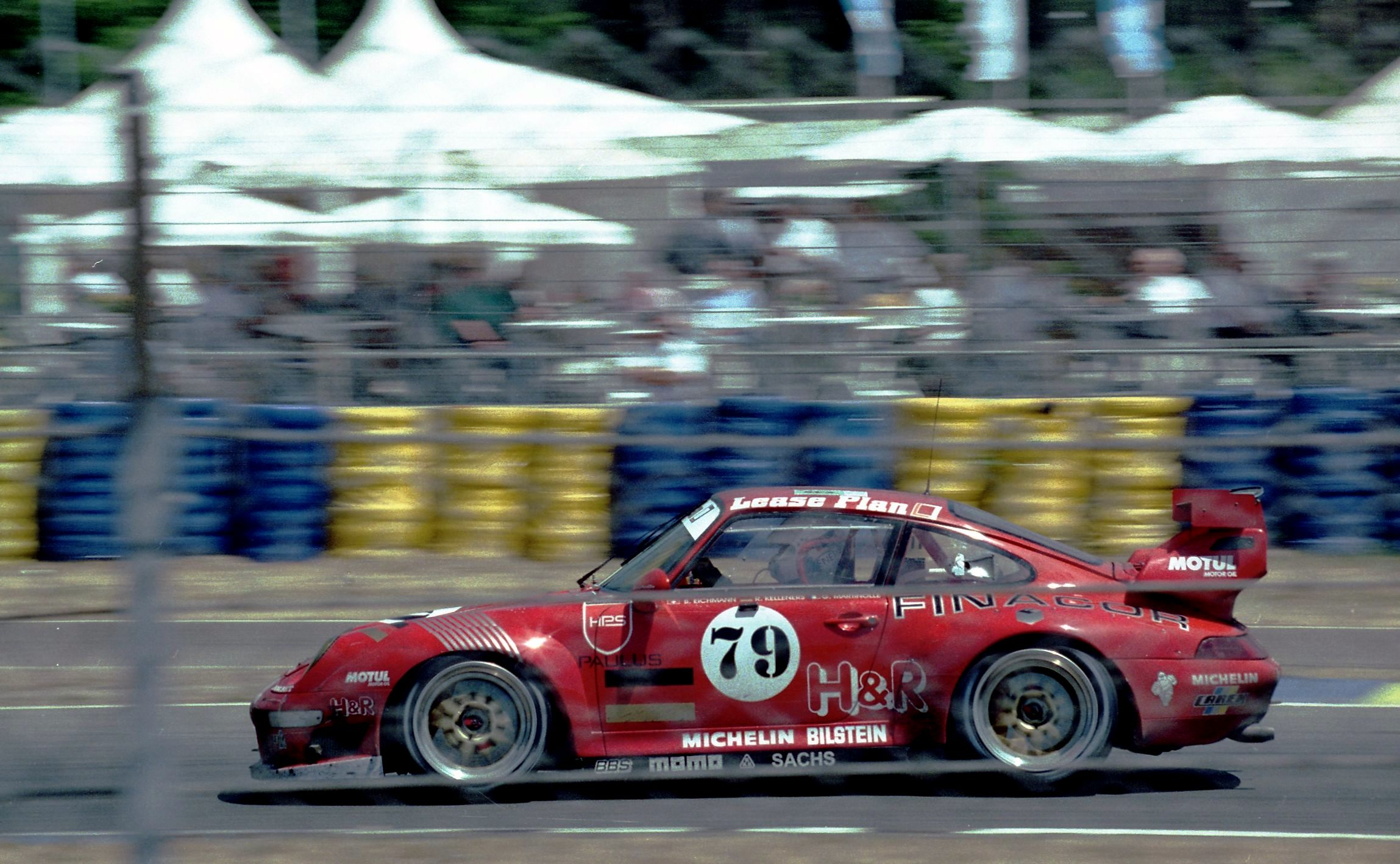
Kelleners' class-winning Porsche at the 1996 Le Mans 24 Hours.

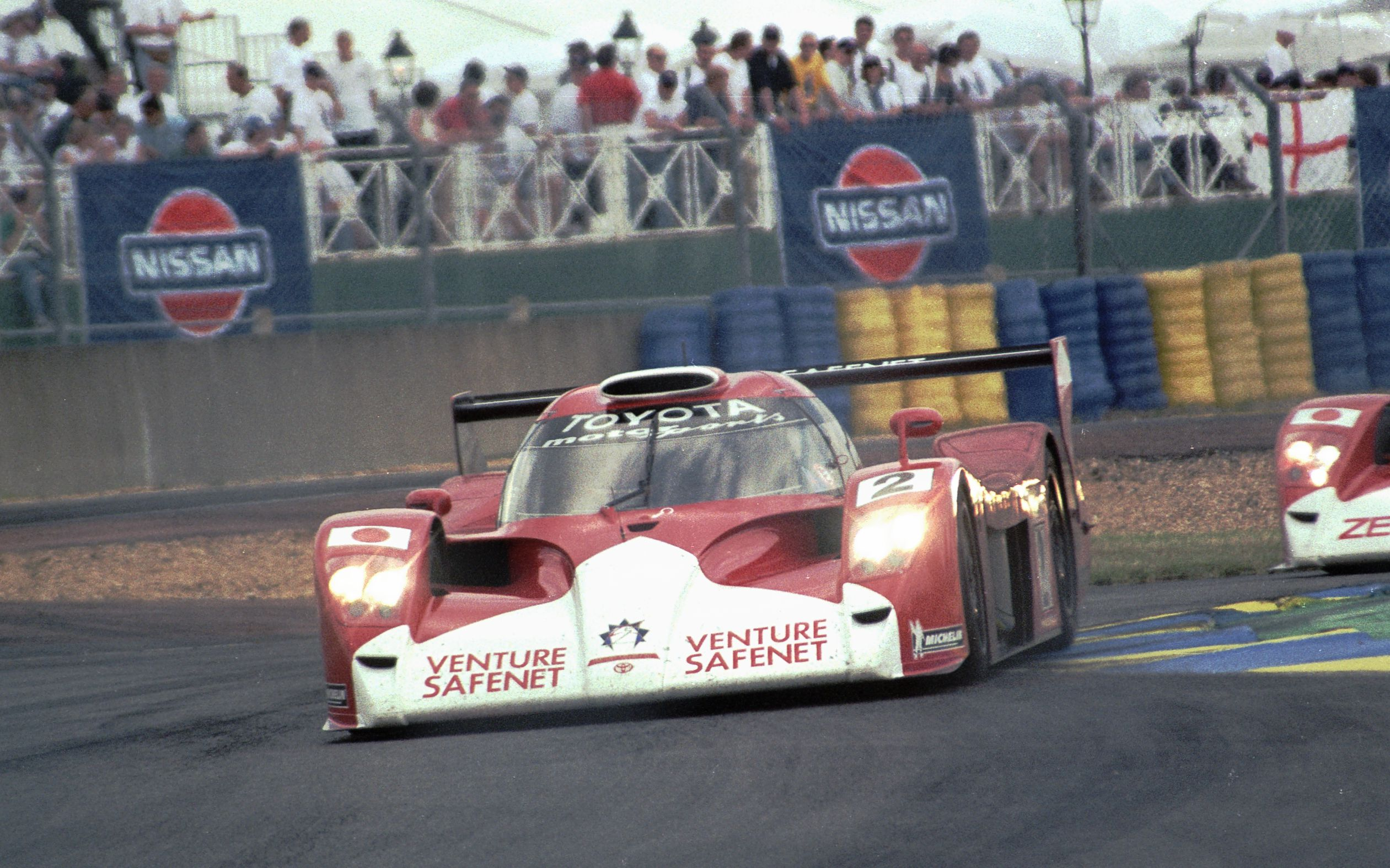
Kelleners was a factory driver for Toyota in 1998 and 1999.

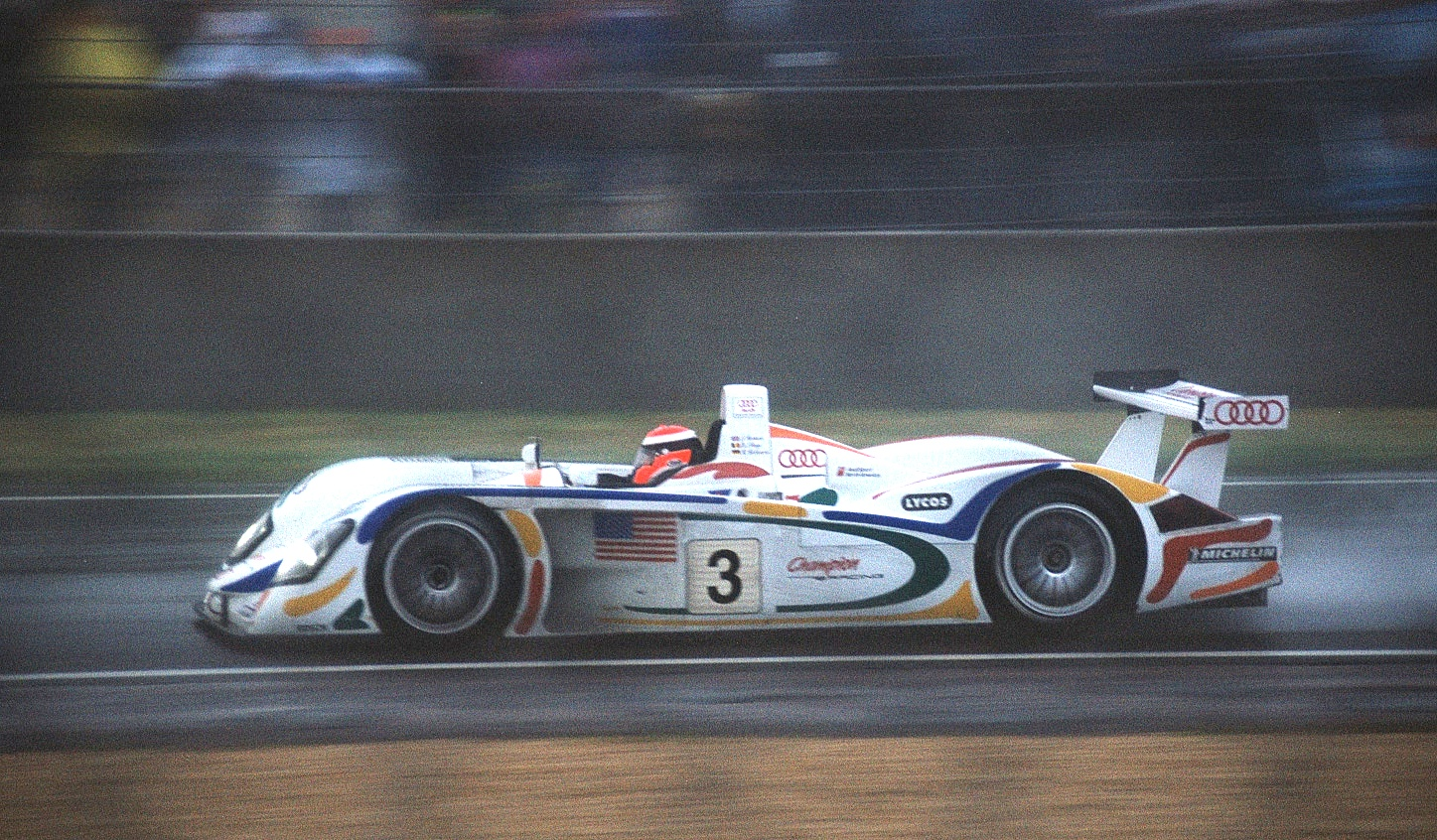
Kelleners racing an Audi R8 for Champion Racing in 2001.

=== Complete 24 Hours of Le Mans results ===
Year	Team	Co-Drivers	Car	Class	Laps	Pos.	Class Pos.
1996	(Germany) Roock Racing Team	(France) Guy Martinolle (Switzerland) Bruno Eichmann	Porsche 911 GT2	GT2	317	12th	**1st**
1997	(Germany) Porsche AG	(France) Emmanuel Collard (France) Yannick Dalmas	Porsche 911 GT1	GT1	327	DNF	DNF
1998	(Japan) Toyota Motorsport (Germany) Toyota Team Europe	(Belgium) Thierry Boutsen (United Kingdom) Geoff Lees	Toyota GT-One	GT1	330	DNF	DNF
1999	(Japan) Toyota Motorsport (Germany) Toyota Team Europe	(Belgium) Thierry Boutsen (United Kingdom) Allan McNish	Toyota GT-One	LMGTP	173	DNF	DNF
2000	(France) Racing Organisation Course	(France) David Terrien (Switzerland) Jean-Denis Délétraz	Reynard 2KQ-LM-Volkswagen	LMP675	44	DNF	DNF
2001	(United States) Champion Racing	(United Kingdom) Johnny Herbert (Belgium) Didier Theys	Audi R8	LMP900	81	DNF	DNF
2003	(United States) Risi Competizione	(United States) Anthony Lazzaro (United States) Terry Borcheller	Ferrari 360 Modena GT	GT	269	26th	8th
2004	(Germany) Freisinger Motorsport	(Monaco) Stéphane Ortelli (France) Romain Dumas	Porsche 911 GT3-RSR	GT	321	13th	**3rd**
2008	(Netherlands) Snoras Spyker Squadron	(Russia) Alexey Vasilyev (United Kingdom) Peter Dumbreck	Spyker C8 Laviolette GT2-R	GT2	43	DNF	DNF

=== Complete Le Mans Cup results ===
(key) (Races in bold indicate pole position; results in italics indicate fastest lap)

Year	Entrant	Class	Chassis	1	2	3	4	5	6	7	Rank	Points
2023	Racing Spirit of Léman	LMP3	Ligier JS P320	CAT; 19	LMS; 1 Ret	LMS; 2; 16	LEC; 14	ARA	SPA; 12	ALG; 19	33rd	0
2025	Racing Spirit of Léman	LMP3 Pro-Am	Ligier JS P325	CAT	LEC	LMS; 1	LMS; 2	SPA; 5	SIL; 9	ALG; 11	19th	13

Sporting positions
Preceded by Harald Grohs	Porsche Carrera Cup Germany champion 1996	Succeeded by Wolfgang Land
