= 1996 BPR 4 Hours of Nürburgring =

Nürburgring (1995–2001)

The 1996 BPR 4 Hours of Nürburgring, also known as the DMC/ADAC Rundstrecken Rennen, was the fifth race of the 1996 BPR Global GT Series. It was run at the Nürburgring on 30 June 1996.

== Official results ==
Class winners in bold. Cars failing to complete 75% of winner's distance marked as Not Classified (NC).

| Pos | Class | No | Team | Drivers | Chassis | Tyre | Laps |
| Pos | Class | No | Team | Drivers | Engine | Tyre | Laps |
|---|---|---|---|---|---|---|---|
| 1 | GT1 | 1 | (United Kingdom) West Competition (United Kingdom) David Price Racing | (Germany) Thomas Bscher (Netherlands) Peter Kox | McLaren F1 GTR | **G** | 138 |
| 1 | GT1 | 1 | (United Kingdom) West Competition (United Kingdom) David Price Racing | (Germany) Thomas Bscher (Netherlands) Peter Kox | BMW S70 6.1L V12 | **G** | 138 |
| 2 | GT1 | 2 | (United Kingdom) Gulf Racing (United Kingdom) GTC Motorsport | (United Kingdom) Ray Bellm (United Kingdom) James Weaver | McLaren F1 GTR | **MI** | 138 |
| 2 | GT1 | 2 | (United Kingdom) Gulf Racing (United Kingdom) GTC Motorsport | (United Kingdom) Ray Bellm (United Kingdom) James Weaver | BMW S70 6.1L V12 | **MI** | 138 |
| 3 | GT1 | 6 | (United Kingdom) Gulf Racing (United Kingdom) GTC Motorsport | (United Kingdom) Lindsay Owen-Jones (France) Pierre-Henri Raphanel | McLaren F1 GTR | **MI** | 136 |
| 3 | GT1 | 6 | (United Kingdom) Gulf Racing (United Kingdom) GTC Motorsport | (United Kingdom) Lindsay Owen-Jones (France) Pierre-Henri Raphanel | BMW S70 6.1L V12 | **MI** | 136 |
| 4 | GT1 | 28 | (Italy) Ennea Igol | (France) Jean-Marc Gounon (France) Éric Bernard (France) Paul Belmondo | Ferrari F40 GTE | **P** | 135 |
| 4 | GT1 | 28 | (Italy) Ennea Igol | (France) Jean-Marc Gounon (France) Éric Bernard (France) Paul Belmondo | Ferrari 3.5L Turbo V8 | **P** | 135 |
| 5 | GT1 | 29 | (Italy) Ferrari Club Italia (Italy) Ennea SRL | (Italy) Max Angelelli (Italy) Piero Nappi (Austria) Helmut König | Ferrari F40 GTE | **P** | 133 |
| 5 | GT1 | 29 | (Italy) Ferrari Club Italia (Italy) Ennea SRL | (Italy) Max Angelelli (Italy) Piero Nappi (Austria) Helmut König | Ferrari 3.5L Turbo V8 | **P** | 133 |
| 6 | GT1 | 40 | (France) Pilot Pen Racing | (France) Michel Ferté (France) Olivier Thévenin | Ferrari F40 LM | **MI** | 133 |
| 6 | GT1 | 40 | (France) Pilot Pen Racing | (France) Michel Ferté (France) Olivier Thévenin | Ferrari 3.0L Turbo V8 | **MI** | 133 |
| 7 | GT2 | 56 | (Germany) Roock Racing | (Switzerland) Bruno Eichmann (Germany) Gerd Ruch (Belgium) Michel Neugarten | Porsche 911 GT2 | **MI** | 132 |
| 7 | GT2 | 56 | (Germany) Roock Racing | (Switzerland) Bruno Eichmann (Germany) Gerd Ruch (Belgium) Michel Neugarten | Porsche 3.6L Turbo Flat-6 | **MI** | 132 |
| 8 | GT2 | 64 | (United Kingdom) Lanzante Motorsport | (United States) Paul Burdell (United Kingdom) Soames Langton | Porsche 911 GT2 | **MI** | 131 |
| 8 | GT2 | 64 | (United Kingdom) Lanzante Motorsport | (United States) Paul Burdell (United Kingdom) Soames Langton | Porsche 3.6L Turbo Flat-6 | **MI** | 131 |
| 9 | GT2 | 52 | (Germany) Krauss Rennsporttechnik | (Germany) Bernhard Müller (Germany) Michael Trunk | Porsche 911 GT2 | | 130 |
| 9 | GT2 | 52 | (Germany) Krauss Rennsporttechnik | (Germany) Bernhard Müller (Germany) Michael Trunk | Porsche 3.6L Turbo Flat-6 | | 130 |
| 10 | GT1 | 16 | (Austria) Karl Augustin | (Austria) Karl Augustin (Germany) Ernst Gschwender | Porsche 911 GT2 Cetoni | **P** | 130 |
| 10 | GT1 | 16 | (Austria) Karl Augustin | (Austria) Karl Augustin (Germany) Ernst Gschwender | Porsche 3.6L Turbo Flat-6 | **P** | 130 |
| 11 | GT1 | 8 | (France) BBA Compétition | (France) Jean-Luc Maury-Laribière (Netherlands) Hans Hugenholtz | McLaren F1 GTR | **D** | 130 |
| 11 | GT1 | 8 | (France) BBA Compétition | (France) Jean-Luc Maury-Laribière (Netherlands) Hans Hugenholtz | BMW S70 6.1L V12 | **D** | 130 |
| 12 | GT2 | 55 | (Switzerland) Stadler Motorsport | (Germany) Ulli Richter (Switzerland) Lilian Bryner (Switzerland) Enzo Calderari | Porsche 911 GT2 | **P** | 130 |
| 12 | GT2 | 55 | (Switzerland) Stadler Motorsport | (Germany) Ulli Richter (Switzerland) Lilian Bryner (Switzerland) Enzo Calderari | Porsche 3.6L Turbo Flat-6 | **P** | 130 |
| 13 | GT2 | 88 | (Germany) Konrad Motorsport | (Germany) Wido Rössler (Switzerland) Toni Seiler (Austria) Franz Konrad | Porsche 911 GT2 | **MI** | 130 |
| 13 | GT2 | 88 | (Germany) Konrad Motorsport | (Germany) Wido Rössler (Switzerland) Toni Seiler (Austria) Franz Konrad | Porsche 3.6L Turbo Flat-6 | **MI** | 130 |
| 14 | GT2 | 65 | (Germany) Roock Racing | (France) François Lafon (France) Lucien Guitteny (France) Jean-Marc Smadja | Porsche 911 GT2 | **MI** | 129 |
| 14 | GT2 | 65 | (Germany) Roock Racing | (France) François Lafon (France) Lucien Guitteny (France) Jean-Marc Smadja | Porsche 3.6L Turbo Flat-6 | **MI** | 129 |
| 15 | GT2 | 99 | (Switzerland) Elf Haberthur Racing | (France) Ferdinand de Lesseps (France) Richard Balandras (Belgium) Kurt Thiers | Porsche 911 GT2 | **P** | 128 |
| 15 | GT2 | 99 | (Switzerland) Elf Haberthur Racing | (France) Ferdinand de Lesseps (France) Richard Balandras (Belgium) Kurt Thiers | Porsche 3.6L Turbo Flat-6 | **P** | 128 |
| 16 | GT2 | 93 | (United Kingdom) New Hardware Parr Motorsport | (United Kingdom) Hugh Price (United Kingdom) John Robinson (United Kingdom) Peter Owen | Porsche 911 GT2 | **P** | 127 |
| 16 | GT2 | 93 | (United Kingdom) New Hardware Parr Motorsport | (United Kingdom) Hugh Price (United Kingdom) John Robinson (United Kingdom) Peter Owen | Porsche 3.6L Turbo Flat-6 | **P** | 127 |
| 17 | GT2 | 87 | (Germany) RWS Brun Motorsport | (Italy) Raffaele Sangiuolo (Germany) Gottfried Rampl (France) Michel Ligonnet | Porsche 911 GT2 | **P** | 126 |
| 17 | GT2 | 87 | (Germany) RWS Brun Motorsport | (Italy) Raffaele Sangiuolo (Germany) Gottfried Rampl (France) Michel Ligonnet | Porsche 3.6L Turbo Flat-6 | **P** | 126 |
| 18 | GT2 | 77 | (Germany) Seikel Motorsport | (Austria) Manfred Jurasz (Italy) Giuseppe Quargentan (Germany) Peter Seikel | Porsche 911 GT2 | **P** | 126 |
| 18 | GT2 | 77 | (Germany) Seikel Motorsport | (Austria) Manfred Jurasz (Italy) Giuseppe Quargentan (Germany) Peter Seikel | Porsche 3.6L Turbo Flat-6 | **P** | 126 |
| 19 | GT2 | 102 | (Belgium) Excelsior (Belgium) GLPK Racing | (Belgium) Albert Vanierschot (Belgium) Paul Kumpen (Italy) Franco La Rosa | Porsche 911 GT2 | ? | 126 |
| 19 | GT2 | 102 | (Belgium) Excelsior (Belgium) GLPK Racing | (Belgium) Albert Vanierschot (Belgium) Paul Kumpen (Italy) Franco La Rosa | Porsche 3.6L Turbo Flat-6 | ? | 126 |
| 20 | GT2 | 105 | (Germany) Repsol Kremer Racing | (Spain) Alfonso de Orléans-Bourbon (Spain) Andres Vilariño | Porsche 911 GT2 | **G** | 125 |
| 20 | GT2 | 105 | (Germany) Repsol Kremer Racing | (Spain) Alfonso de Orléans-Bourbon (Spain) Andres Vilariño | Porsche 3.6L Turbo Flat-6 | **G** | 125 |
| 21 | GT2 | 84 | (Italy) Promosport Italia | (Italy) Renato Mastropietro (Italy) Vincenzo Polli (Italy) Giovanni Lavaggi | Porsche 911 GT2 | **P** | 125 |
| 21 | GT2 | 84 | (Italy) Promosport Italia | (Italy) Renato Mastropietro (Italy) Vincenzo Polli (Italy) Giovanni Lavaggi | Porsche 3.6L Turbo Flat-6 | **P** | 125 |
| 22 | GT2 | 50 | (Switzerland) Stadler Motorsport | (Switzerland) Uwe Sick (Switzerland) Charles Margueon | Porsche 911 GT2 | **P** | 124 |
| 22 | GT2 | 50 | (Switzerland) Stadler Motorsport | (Switzerland) Uwe Sick (Switzerland) Charles Margueon | Porsche 3.6L Turbo Flat-6 | **P** | 124 |
| 23 | GT2 | 69 | (Germany) Proton Competition | (Germany) Peter Erl (Germany) Gerold Ried (Germany) Andy Bovensiepen | Porsche 911 GT2 | **P** | 123 |
| 23 | GT2 | 69 | (Germany) Proton Competition | (Germany) Peter Erl (Germany) Gerold Ried (Germany) Andy Bovensiepen | Porsche 3.6L Turbo Flat-6 | **P** | 123 |
| 24 | GT1 | 11 | (Germany) Konrad Motorsport | (Austria) Franz Konrad (France) Bob Wollek | Porsche 911 GT2 Evo | **MI** | 123 |
| 24 | GT1 | 11 | (Germany) Konrad Motorsport | (Austria) Franz Konrad (France) Bob Wollek | Porsche 3.6L Turbo Flat-6 | **MI** | 123 |
| 25 | GT2 | 59 | (France) Raymond Touroul | (France) Raymond Touroul (France) Thierry Perrier (France) Didier Ortion | Porsche 993 RSR | ? | 122 |
| 25 | GT2 | 59 | (France) Raymond Touroul | (France) Raymond Touroul (France) Thierry Perrier (France) Didier Ortion | Porsche 3.8 Flat-6 | ? | 122 |
| 26 | GT2 | 85 | (Italy) Gianluigi Locatelli | (Italy) Gianluigi Locatelli (Italy) Leonardo Maddalena | Porsche 993 Supercup | ? | 122 |
| 26 | GT2 | 85 | (Italy) Gianluigi Locatelli | (Italy) Gianluigi Locatelli (Italy) Leonardo Maddalena | Porsche 3.8 Flat-6 | ? | 122 |
| 27 | GT2 | 73 | (United Kingdom) Morgan Motor Company | (United Kingdom) Charles Morgan (United Kingdom) Bill Wykeham | Morgan Plus 8 GTR | **D** | 120 |
| 27 | GT2 | 73 | (United Kingdom) Morgan Motor Company | (United Kingdom) Charles Morgan (United Kingdom) Bill Wykeham | Rover V8 5.0L V8 | **D** | 120 |
| 28 DNF | GT1 | 26 | (United Kingdom) Lister Storm Racing | (United Kingdom) Geoff Lees (United Kingdom) Tiff Needell | Lister Storm GTS | **MI** | 117 |
| 28 DNF | GT1 | 26 | (United Kingdom) Lister Storm Racing | (United Kingdom) Geoff Lees (United Kingdom) Tiff Needell | Jaguar 7.0L V12 | **MI** | 117 |
| 29 DNF | GT1 | 27 | (Italy) Ennea Igol | (Italy) Luciano Della Noce (Sweden) Anders Olofsson | Ferrari F40 GTE | **P** | 115 |
| 29 DNF | GT1 | 27 | (Italy) Ennea Igol | (Italy) Luciano Della Noce (Sweden) Anders Olofsson | Ferrari 3.5L Turbo V8 | **P** | 115 |
| 30 DNF | GT2 | 66 | (United Kingdom) EMKA Racing | (United Kingdom) Steve O'Rourke (United Kingdom) Guy Holmes | Porsche 911 GT2 | **D** | 105 |
| 30 DNF | GT2 | 66 | (United Kingdom) EMKA Racing | (United Kingdom) Steve O'Rourke (United Kingdom) Guy Holmes | Porsche 3.6L Turbo Flat-6 | **D** | 105 |
| 31 DNF | GT1 | 3 | (United Kingdom) Harrods Mach One Racing (United Kingdom) David Price Racing | (United Kingdom) Andy Wallace (France) Olivier Grouillard | McLaren F1 GTR | **G** | 84 |
| 31 DNF | GT1 | 3 | (United Kingdom) Harrods Mach One Racing (United Kingdom) David Price Racing | (United Kingdom) Andy Wallace (France) Olivier Grouillard | BMW S70 6.1L V12 | **G** | 84 |
| 32 DNF | GT2 | 96 | (France) Larbre Compétition | (France) Patrice Goueslard (Germany) André Ahrlé | Porsche 911 GT2 | **P** | 79 |
| 32 DNF | GT2 | 96 | (France) Larbre Compétition | (France) Patrice Goueslard (Germany) André Ahrlé | Porsche 3.6L Turbo Flat-6 | **P** | 79 |
| 33 DNF | GT2 | 75 | (United Kingdom) Agusta Racing Team | (Italy) Almo Coppelli (Italy) Rocky Agusta (Italy) Marco Spinelli | Callaway Corvette LM-GT | **D** | 71 |
| 33 DNF | GT2 | 75 | (United Kingdom) Agusta Racing Team | (Italy) Almo Coppelli (Italy) Rocky Agusta (Italy) Marco Spinelli | Chevrolet LT1 6.2L V8 | **D** | 71 |
| 34 DNF | GT2 | 83 | (Netherlands) Marcos Racing International | (Netherlands) Cor Euser (Brazil) Thomas Erdos | Marcos LM600 | **D** | 61 |
| 34 DNF | GT2 | 83 | (Netherlands) Marcos Racing International | (Netherlands) Cor Euser (Brazil) Thomas Erdos | Chevrolet 6.0L V8 | **D** | 61 |
| 35 DNF | GT1 | 5 | (France) Eric Graham | (France) Eric Graham (France) Michel Faraut (France) David Velay | Venturi 600 LM | **D** | 60 |
| 35 DNF | GT1 | 5 | (France) Eric Graham | (France) Eric Graham (France) Michel Faraut (France) David Velay | Renault PRV 3.0L Turbo V6 | **D** | 60 |
| 36 DNF | GT1 | 49 | (Germany) Freisinger Motorsport | (Germany) Wolfgang Kaufmann (France) Patrick Vuillaume (Japan) Yukihiro Hane | Porsche 911 GT2 Evo | **G** | 53 |
| 36 DNF | GT1 | 49 | (Germany) Freisinger Motorsport | (Germany) Wolfgang Kaufmann (France) Patrick Vuillaume (Japan) Yukihiro Hane | Porsche 3.6L Turbo Flat-6 | **G** | 53 |
| 37 DNF | GT1 | 34 | (Germany) Scheer Motorsport | (Germany) Klaus Scheer (Germany) Norbert Graf (Germany) Edgar Dören | Porsche 911 Bi-Turbo | ? | 52 |
| 37 DNF | GT1 | 34 | (Germany) Scheer Motorsport | (Germany) Klaus Scheer (Germany) Norbert Graf (Germany) Edgar Dören | Porsche 3.8L Turbo Flat-6 | ? | 52 |
| 38 DNF | GT1 | 22 | (United Kingdom) Lotus Racing Team | (Netherlands) Jan Lammers (United Kingdom) Chris Goodwin | Lotus Esprit V8 Turbo | **MI** | 40 |
| 38 DNF | GT1 | 22 | (United Kingdom) Lotus Racing Team | (Netherlands) Jan Lammers (United Kingdom) Chris Goodwin | Lotus 3.5L Turbo V8 | **MI** | 40 |
| 39 DNF | GT2 | 53 | (Switzerland) Yellow Racing | (France) Christian Heinkelé (Sweden) Tony Ring (France) François O'Born | Ferrari F355 GT | **MI** | 37 |
| 39 DNF | GT2 | 53 | (Switzerland) Yellow Racing | (France) Christian Heinkelé (Sweden) Tony Ring (France) François O'Born | Ferrari 3.5L V8 | **MI** | 37 |
| 40 DNF | GT1 | 31 | (Germany) Hartmann Motorsport | (Germany) Bernhard Holz (Germany) Helmut Pfeifer (Germany) Horst Stäbler | Ferrari F40 | ? | 37 |
| 40 DNF | GT1 | 31 | (Germany) Hartmann Motorsport | (Germany) Bernhard Holz (Germany) Helmut Pfeifer (Germany) Horst Stäbler | Ferrari 3.0L Turbo V8 | ? | 37 |
| 41 DNF | GT2 | 91 | (France) V de V Racing Team | (Belgium) Eric van de Vyver (France) Erick Rumpler | Gillet Vertigo | **MI** | 25 |
| 41 DNF | GT2 | 91 | (France) V de V Racing Team | (Belgium) Eric van de Vyver (France) Erick Rumpler | Ford Cosworth YB 2.0L Turbo I4 | **MI** | 25 |
| 42 DNF | GT1 | 33 | (United Kingdom) Superpower Engineering | (Denmark) Thorkild Thyrring (United Kingdom) Phil Andrews (France) Jérôme Policand | De Tomaso Pantera | **G** | 24 |
| 42 DNF | GT1 | 33 | (United Kingdom) Superpower Engineering | (Denmark) Thorkild Thyrring (United Kingdom) Phil Andrews (France) Jérôme Policand | Ford (Lozano) 5.0L V8 | **G** | 24 |
| 43 DNF | GT1 | 4 | (Germany) Roock Racing | (France) Jean-Pierre Jarier (Germany) Ralf Kelleners | Porsche 911 GT2 Evo | **MI** | 21 |
| 43 DNF | GT1 | 4 | (Germany) Roock Racing | (France) Jean-Pierre Jarier (Germany) Ralf Kelleners | Porsche 3.6L Turbo Flat-6 | **MI** | 21 |
| 44 DNF | GT1 | 21 | (United Kingdom) Lotus Racing Team | (United Kingdom) Alex Portman (Netherlands) Mike Hezemans | Lotus Esprit V8 Turbo | **MI** | 10 |
| 44 DNF | GT1 | 21 | (United Kingdom) Lotus Racing Team | (United Kingdom) Alex Portman (Netherlands) Mike Hezemans | Lotus 3.5L Turbo V8 | **MI** | 10 |
| 45 DNF | GT1 | 14 | (Germany) Repsol Kremer Racing | (Spain) Tomas Saldaña (France) Christophe Bouchut | Porsche 911 GT2 Evo | **G** | 5 |
| 45 DNF | GT1 | 14 | (Germany) Repsol Kremer Racing | (Spain) Tomas Saldaña (France) Christophe Bouchut | Porsche 3.6L Turbo Flat-6 | **G** | 5 |
| 46 DNF | GT2 | 90 | (Italy) Robert Sikkens Racing | (Italy) Angelo Zadra (Italy) Maurizio Monforte | Porsche 911 GT2 | **G** | 1 |
| 46 DNF | GT2 | 90 | (Italy) Robert Sikkens Racing | (Italy) Angelo Zadra (Italy) Maurizio Monforte | Porsche 3.6L Turbo Flat-6 | **G** | 1 |
| DNS | GT1 | 48 | (Germany) Freisinger Motorsport | (Switzerland) Clay Regazzoni | Porsche 911 GT2 Evo | **G** | - |
| DNS | GT1 | 48 | (Germany) Freisinger Motorsport | (Switzerland) Clay Regazzoni | Porsche 3.6L Turbo Flat-6 | **G** | - |
| DNS | GT2 | 74 | (Switzerland) Callaway Schweiz | (Switzerland) Kurt Huber (Switzerland) Hans Hauser (Switzerland) Andrea Chiesa | Callaway Corvette LM-GT | ? | - |
| DNS | GT2 | 74 | (Switzerland) Callaway Schweiz | (Switzerland) Kurt Huber (Switzerland) Hans Hauser (Switzerland) Andrea Chiesa | Chevrolet LT1 6.2L V8 | ? | - |

== Statistics ==
- Pole Position – (Netherlands) Jan Lammers (#22 Lotus Racing Team) – 1:37.070
- Fastest Lap – (France) Jean-Marc Gounon (#28 Ennea Igol) – 1:38.270

BPR Global GT Series
| Previous race: 1996 BPR 4 Hours of Silverstone | 1996 season | Next race: 1996 BPR 4 Hours of Anderstorp |
