= 1996 BPR 4 Hours of Silverstone =

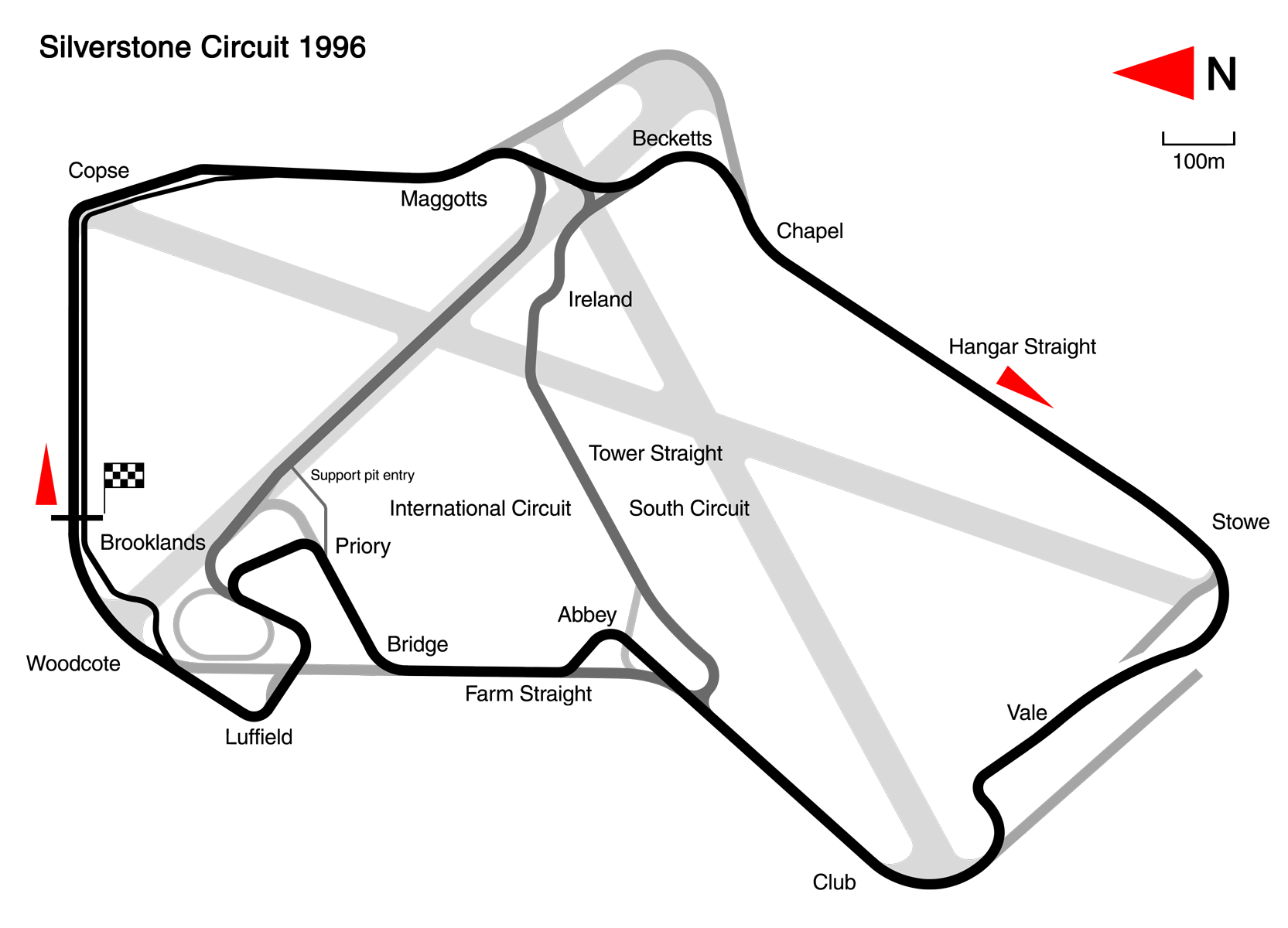
Map of the Silverstone Circuit (1996)

The 1996 BPR 4 Hours of Silverstone was the fourth race of the 1996 BPR Global GT Series. It was run at the Silverstone Circuit on 12 May 1996. The race was also appointed the British Empire Trophy.

== Official results ==
Class winners in bold. Cars failing to complete 75% of winner's distance marked as Not Classified (NC).

Pos	Class	No	Team	Drivers	Chassis	Tyre	Laps
Pos	Class	No	Team	Drivers	Engine	Tyre	Laps
1	**GT1**	**3**	**(United Kingdom) Harrods Mach One Racing (United Kingdom) David Price Racing**	**(United Kingdom) Andy Wallace (France) Olivier Grouillard**	**McLaren F1 GTR**	**G**	**125**
1	**GT1**	**3**	**(United Kingdom) Harrods Mach One Racing (United Kingdom) David Price Racing**	**(United Kingdom) Andy Wallace (France) Olivier Grouillard**	**BMW S70 6.1L V12**	**G**	**125**
2	GT1	22	(United Kingdom) Lotus Racing Team	(Netherlands) Jan Lammers (United Kingdom) Perry McCarthy	Lotus Esprit V8 Turbo	**MI**	125
2	GT1	22	(United Kingdom) Lotus Racing Team	(Netherlands) Jan Lammers (United Kingdom) Perry McCarthy	Lotus 3.5L Turbo V8	**MI**	125
3	GT1	2	(United Kingdom) Gulf Racing (United Kingdom) GTC Motorsport	(United Kingdom) James Weaver (United Kingdom) Ray Bellm	McLaren F1 GTR	**MI**	125
3	GT1	2	(United Kingdom) Gulf Racing (United Kingdom) GTC Motorsport	(United Kingdom) James Weaver (United Kingdom) Ray Bellm	BMW S70 6.1L V12	**MI**	125
4	GT1	24	(Italy) Bigazzi Team SRL (Germany) BMW Motorsport	(United Kingdom) Steve Soper (Brazil) Nelson Piquet	McLaren F1 GTR	**MI**	125
4	GT1	24	(Italy) Bigazzi Team SRL (Germany) BMW Motorsport	(United Kingdom) Steve Soper (Brazil) Nelson Piquet	BMW S70 6.1L V12	**MI**	125
5	GT1	28	(Italy) Ennea Igol	(France) Jean-Marc Gounon (France) Éric Bernard (France) Paul Belmondo	Ferrari F40 GTE	**P**	125
5	GT1	28	(Italy) Ennea Igol	(France) Jean-Marc Gounon (France) Éric Bernard (France) Paul Belmondo	Ferrari 3.5L Turbo V8	**P**	125
6	GT1	1	(United Kingdom) West Competition (United Kingdom) David Price Racing	(Denmark) John Nielsen (Germany) Thomas Bscher	McLaren F1 GTR	**G**	124
6	GT1	1	(United Kingdom) West Competition (United Kingdom) David Price Racing	(Denmark) John Nielsen (Germany) Thomas Bscher	BMW S70 6.1L V12	**G**	124
7	GT1	27	(Italy) Ennea Igol	(Sweden) Anders Olofsson (Italy) Luciano della Noce	Ferrari F40 GTE	**P**	123
7	GT1	27	(Italy) Ennea Igol	(Sweden) Anders Olofsson (Italy) Luciano della Noce	Ferrari 3.5L Turbo V8	**P**	123
8	GT1	40	(France) Pilot Pen Racing	(France) Michel Ferté (France) Olivier Thévenin	Ferrari F40 LM	**MI**	122
8	GT1	40	(France) Pilot Pen Racing	(France) Michel Ferté (France) Olivier Thévenin	Ferrari 3.0L Turbo V8	**MI**	122
9	GT1	11	(Germany) Konrad Motorsport	(France) Bob Wollek (Austria) Franz Konrad	Porsche 911 GT2 Evo	**MI**	121
9	GT1	11	(Germany) Konrad Motorsport	(France) Bob Wollek (Austria) Franz Konrad	Porsche 3.6L Turbo Flat-6	**MI**	121
10	**GT2**	**83**	**(Netherlands) Marcos Racing International**	**(Netherlands) Cor Euser (Brazil) Thomas Erdos**	**Marcos LM600**	**D**	**119**
10	**GT2**	**83**	**(Netherlands) Marcos Racing International**	**(Netherlands) Cor Euser (Brazil) Thomas Erdos**	**Chevrolet 6.0L V8**	**D**	**119**
11	GT1	25	(Italy) Bigazzi Team SRL (Germany) BMW Motorsport	(France) Jacques Laffite (Belgium) Marc Duez	McLaren F1 GTR	**MI**	118
11	GT1	25	(Italy) Bigazzi Team SRL (Germany) BMW Motorsport	(France) Jacques Laffite (Belgium) Marc Duez	BMW S70 6.1L V12	**MI**	118
12	GT2	60	(Germany) Oberbayern Motorsport	(Germany) Jürgen von Gartzen (Netherlands) Patrick Huisman	Porsche 911 GT2	**P**	118
12	GT2	60	(Germany) Oberbayern Motorsport	(Germany) Jürgen von Gartzen (Netherlands) Patrick Huisman	Porsche 3.6L Turbo Flat-6	**P**	118
13	GT2	92	(United Kingdom) New Hardware Parr Motorsport	(France) Stéphane Ortelli (United Kingdom) Robert Nearn (United States) Andy Pilgrim	Porsche 911 GT2	**P**	118
13	GT2	92	(United Kingdom) New Hardware Parr Motorsport	(France) Stéphane Ortelli (United Kingdom) Robert Nearn (United States) Andy Pilgrim	Porsche 3.6L Turbo Flat-6	**P**	118
14	GT2	55	(Switzerland) Stadler Motorsport	(Switzerland) Lilian Bryner (Switzerland) Enzo Calderari	Porsche 911 GT2	**P**	118
14	GT2	55	(Switzerland) Stadler Motorsport	(Switzerland) Lilian Bryner (Switzerland) Enzo Calderari	Porsche 3.6L Turbo Flat-6	**P**	118
15	GT2	96	(France) Larbre Compétition	(France) Patrice Goueslard (Germany) André Ahrlé (France) Jean-Pierre Malcher	Porsche 911 GT2	**P**	117
15	GT2	96	(France) Larbre Compétition	(France) Patrice Goueslard (Germany) André Ahrlé (France) Jean-Pierre Malcher	Porsche 3.6L Turbo Flat-6	**P**	117
16	GT1	8	(France) BBA Compétition	(France) Jean-Luc Maury-Laribière (Netherlands) Hans Hugenholtz (Belgium) Vincent Vosse	McLaren F1 GTR	**D**	117
16	GT1	8	(France) BBA Compétition	(France) Jean-Luc Maury-Laribière (Netherlands) Hans Hugenholtz (Belgium) Vincent Vosse	BMW S70 6.1L V12	**D**	117
17	GT2	64	(United Kingdom) Lanzante Motorsport	(United States) Paul Burdell (United Kingdom) Soames Langton (Sweden) Stanley Dickens	Porsche 911 GT2	**MI**	116
17	GT2	64	(United Kingdom) Lanzante Motorsport	(United States) Paul Burdell (United Kingdom) Soames Langton (Sweden) Stanley Dickens	Porsche 3.6L Turbo Flat-6	**MI**	116
18	GT2	52	(Germany) Krauss Rennsporttechnik	(Germany) Bernhard Müller (Germany) Michael Trunk	Porsche 911 GT2	**P**	116
18	GT2	52	(Germany) Krauss Rennsporttechnik	(Germany) Bernhard Müller (Germany) Michael Trunk	Porsche 3.6L Turbo Flat-6	**P**	116
19	GT2	78	(Germany) Seikel Motorsport	(Austria) Hermann Duller (Austria) Helmut König	Porsche 911 GT2	**P**	115
19	GT2	78	(Germany) Seikel Motorsport	(Austria) Hermann Duller (Austria) Helmut König	Porsche 3.6L Turbo Flat-6	**P**	115
20	GT2	87	(Germany) RWS Brun Motorsport	(Italy) Raffaele Sangiuolo (Austria) Hans-Jörg Hofer (Germany) Harald Becker	Porsche 911 GT2	**P**	115
20	GT2	87	(Germany) RWS Brun Motorsport	(Italy) Raffaele Sangiuolo (Austria) Hans-Jörg Hofer (Germany) Harald Becker	Porsche 3.6L Turbo Flat-6	**P**	115
21	GT2	76	(United Kingdom) Agusta Racing Team	(Italy) Rocky Agusta (Italy) Almo Coppelli	Callaway Corvette LM-GT	**D**	115
21	GT2	76	(United Kingdom) Agusta Racing Team	(Italy) Rocky Agusta (Italy) Almo Coppelli	Chevrolet LT1 6.2L V8	**D**	115
22	GT1	43	(France) JCB Racing (France) Raymond Touroul	(France) Jean-Claude Basso (France) Henri Pescarolo	Venturi 600 LM	**D**	114
22	GT1	43	(France) JCB Racing (France) Raymond Touroul	(France) Jean-Claude Basso (France) Henri Pescarolo	Renault PRV 3.0L Turbo V6	**D**	114
23	GT2	90	(Italy) Robert Sikkens Racing	(Italy) Angelo Zadra (Italy) Maurizio Monforte (Italy) Luca Drudi	Porsche 911 GT2	**G**	114
23	GT2	90	(Italy) Robert Sikkens Racing	(Italy) Angelo Zadra (Italy) Maurizio Monforte (Italy) Luca Drudi	Porsche 3.6L Turbo Flat-6	**G**	114
24	GT2	50	(Switzerland) Stadler Motorsport	(Switzerland) Uwe Sick (Switzerland) Charles Margueron (Italy) Renato Mastropietro	Porsche 911 GT2	**P**	114
24	GT2	50	(Switzerland) Stadler Motorsport	(Switzerland) Uwe Sick (Switzerland) Charles Margueron (Italy) Renato Mastropietro	Porsche 3.6L Turbo Flat-6	**P**	114
25	GT1	16	(Austria) Karl Augustin	(Austria) Karl Augustin (Austria) Alfred Gramsel (Germany) Ernest Gschwender	Porsche 911 GT2 Cetoni	**G**	113
25	GT1	16	(Austria) Karl Augustin	(Austria) Karl Augustin (Austria) Alfred Gramsel (Germany) Ernest Gschwender	Porsche 3.6L Turbo Flat-6	**G**	113
26	GT2	80	M2 Team; Porsche Club Belgium	(Belgium) Thierry van Dalen (Belgium) Leo van Sande	Porsche 911 GT2	**P**	113
26	GT2	80	M2 Team; Porsche Club Belgium	(Belgium) Thierry van Dalen (Belgium) Leo van Sande	Porsche 3.6L Turbo Flat-6	**P**	113
27	GT2	66	(United Kingdom) EMKA Racing	(United Kingdom) Steve O'Rourke (United Kingdom) Guy Holmes (United Kingdom) Nick Mason	Porsche 911 GT2	**D**	111
27	GT2	66	(United Kingdom) EMKA Racing	(United Kingdom) Steve O'Rourke (United Kingdom) Guy Holmes (United Kingdom) Nick Mason	Porsche 3.6L Turbo Flat-6	**D**	111
28	GT2	99	(Switzerland) Elf Haberthur Racing	(France) Philippe Charriol (France) Richard Balandras	Porsche 911 GT2	**P**	111
28	GT2	99	(Switzerland) Elf Haberthur Racing	(France) Philippe Charriol (France) Richard Balandras	Porsche 3.6L Turbo Flat-6	**P**	111
29	GT1	5	(France) Eric Graham	(France) Eric Graham (France) Michel Faraut (France) David Velay	Venturi 600 LM	**D**	110
29	GT1	5	(France) Eric Graham	(France) Eric Graham (France) Michel Faraut (France) David Velay	Renault PRV 3.0L Turbo V6	**D**	110
30	GT2	85	(Italy) Gianluigi Locatelli	(Italy) Gianluigi Locatelli (Italy) Leonardo Maddalena	Porsche 993 Supercup	?	109
30	GT2	85	(Italy) Gianluigi Locatelli	(Italy) Gianluigi Locatelli (Italy) Leonardo Maddalena	Porsche 3.8L Flat-6	?	109
31	GT2	53	(Switzerland) Yellow Racing	(France) Christian Heinkelé (Sweden) Tony Ring (Switzerland) Henri-Louis Maunoir	Ferrari F355 GT	**MI**	108
31	GT2	53	(Switzerland) Yellow Racing	(France) Christian Heinkelé (Sweden) Tony Ring (Switzerland) Henri-Louis Maunoir	Ferrari 3.5L V8	**MI**	108
32	GT2	51	(Germany) Proton Competition	(Germany) Peter Erl (Germany) Gerold Ried	Porsche 911 GT2	**P**	106
32	GT2	51	(Germany) Proton Competition	(Germany) Peter Erl (Germany) Gerold Ried	Porsche 3.6L Turbo Flat-6	**P**	106
33	GT1	12	(France) Chardon des Dunes	(France) Patrick Vuillaume (Belgium) Philippe De Craene	Porsche 911 GT2 Evo	?	102
33	GT1	12	(France) Chardon des Dunes	(France) Patrick Vuillaume (Belgium) Philippe De Craene	Porsche 3.6L Turbo Flat-6	?	102
34	GT2	98	(France) Jérôme Brarda	(France) Jérôme Brarda (Norway) Erik Henriksen	Porsche 911 GT2	?	102
34	GT2	98	(France) Jérôme Brarda	(France) Jérôme Brarda (Norway) Erik Henriksen	Porsche 3.6L Turbo Flat-6	?	102
35	GT2	89	(United Kingdom) Team Marcos (United Kingdom) Cirtek Motorsport	(United Kingdom) Dave Warnock (United Kingdom) Robert Schirle (United Kingdom) Andy Purvis	Marcos LM600	**D**	98
35	GT2	89	(United Kingdom) Team Marcos (United Kingdom) Cirtek Motorsport	(United Kingdom) Dave Warnock (United Kingdom) Robert Schirle (United Kingdom) Andy Purvis	Chevrolet 6.0L V8	**D**	98
36	GT1	29	(Italy) Ferrari Club Italia (Italy) Ennea SRL	(Italy) Piero Nappi (Italy) Max Angelelli	Ferrari F40 GTE	**P**	95
36	GT1	29	(Italy) Ferrari Club Italia (Italy) Ennea SRL	(Italy) Piero Nappi (Italy) Max Angelelli	Ferrari 3.5L Turbo V8	**P**	95
37	GT2	94	(United Kingdom) TVR Engineering Ltd	(United Kingdom) Mark Hales (United Kingdom) Phil Andrews (United Kingdom) Dave Loudoun	TVR Cerbera GT	**D**	86
37	GT2	94	(United Kingdom) TVR Engineering Ltd	(United Kingdom) Mark Hales (United Kingdom) Phil Andrews (United Kingdom) Dave Loudoun	TVR Speed Six 4.5L I6	**D**	86
38 DNF	GT2	70	(France) Jean-François Véroux	(France) Jean-François Véroux (France) Jean-Yves Moine (France) Stéphane Leloup	Porsche 911 GT2	?	109
38 DNF	GT2	70	(France) Jean-François Véroux	(France) Jean-François Véroux (France) Jean-Yves Moine (France) Stéphane Leloup	Porsche 3.6L Turbo Flat-6	?	109
39 DNF	GT2	81	M2 Team; Porsche Club Belgium	(Belgium) Eddy van der Pluym (Belgium) Guy Grammet	Porsche 911 GT2	**P**	108
39 DNF	GT2	81	M2 Team; Porsche Club Belgium	(Belgium) Eddy van der Pluym (Belgium) Guy Grammet	Porsche 3.6L Turbo Flat-6	**P**	108
40 DNF	GT2	88	(Germany) Konrad Motorsport	(Brazil) André Lara Resende (Brazil) Gualter Salles (Brazil) Roberto Aranha	Porsche 911 GT2	**MI**	108
40 DNF	GT2	88	(Germany) Konrad Motorsport	(Brazil) André Lara Resende (Brazil) Gualter Salles (Brazil) Roberto Aranha	Porsche 3.6L Turbo Flat-6	**MI**	108
41 DNF	GT1	4	(France) Larbre Compétition	(France) Jean-Pierre Jarier (Germany) Altfrid Heger (Germany) Ralf Kelleners	Porsche 911 GT2 Evo	**P**	103
41 DNF	GT1	4	(France) Larbre Compétition	(France) Jean-Pierre Jarier (Germany) Altfrid Heger (Germany) Ralf Kelleners	Porsche 3.6L Turbo Flat-6	**P**	103
42 DNF	GT2	65	(Germany) Roock Racing	(France) François Lafon (France) Lucien Guitteny (France) Jean-Marc Smadja	Porsche 911 GT2	**MI**	96
42 DNF	GT2	65	(Germany) Roock Racing	(France) François Lafon (France) Lucien Guitteny (France) Jean-Marc Smadja	Porsche 3.6L Turbo Flat-6	**MI**	96
43 DNF	GT2	77	(Germany) Seikel Motorsport	(Austria) Manfred Jurasz (Italy) Giuseppe Quargentan (Germany) Hermann Bilz	Porsche 911 GT2	**P**	94
43 DNF	GT2	77	(Germany) Seikel Motorsport	(Austria) Manfred Jurasz (Italy) Giuseppe Quargentan (Germany) Hermann Bilz	Porsche 3.6L Turbo Flat-6	**P**	94
44 DNF	GT2	56	(Germany) Roock Racing	(Switzerland) Bruno Eichmann (Germany) Gerd Ruch (Belgium) Michel Neugarten	Porsche 911 GT2	**MI**	77
44 DNF	GT2	56	(Germany) Roock Racing	(Switzerland) Bruno Eichmann (Germany) Gerd Ruch (Belgium) Michel Neugarten	Porsche 3.6L Turbo Flat-6	**MI**	77
45 DNF	GT1	23	(United Kingdom) Chamberlain Engineering	(United Kingdom) Geoff Lister (United Kingdom) Nick Adams	Jaguar XJ220	**G**	72
45 DNF	GT1	23	(United Kingdom) Chamberlain Engineering	(United Kingdom) Geoff Lister (United Kingdom) Nick Adams	Jaguar JV6 3.5L Turbo V6	**G**	72
46 DNF	GT1	6	(United Kingdom) Gulf Racing (United Kingdom) GTC Motorsport	(United Kingdom) Lindsay Owen-Jones (France) Pierre-Henri Raphanel	McLaren F1 GTR	**MI**	71
46 DNF	GT1	6	(United Kingdom) Gulf Racing (United Kingdom) GTC Motorsport	(United Kingdom) Lindsay Owen-Jones (France) Pierre-Henri Raphanel	BMW S70 6.1L V12	**MI**	71
47 DNF	GT1	49	(Germany) Freisinger Motorsport	(Germany) Wolfgang Kaufmann (United Kingdom) Richard Dean (United Kingdom) Derek Bell	Porsche 911 GT2 Evo	**G**	61
47 DNF	GT1	49	(Germany) Freisinger Motorsport	(Germany) Wolfgang Kaufmann (United Kingdom) Richard Dean (United Kingdom) Derek Bell	Porsche 3.6L Turbo Flat-6	**G**	61
48 DNF	GT2	97	(United Kingdom) G-Force Racing	(United Kingdom) John Greasley (United Kingdom) John Morrison	Porsche 911 GT2	?	47
48 DNF	GT2	97	(United Kingdom) G-Force Racing	(United Kingdom) John Greasley (United Kingdom) John Morrison	Porsche 3.6L Turbo Flat-6	?	47
49 DNF	GT1	9	(France) Franck Muller Watches (France) Giroix Racing Team	(Switzerland) Jean-Denis Délétraz (France) Fabien Giroix (France) Didier Cottaz	McLaren F1 GTR	**MI**	45
49 DNF	GT1	9	(France) Franck Muller Watches (France) Giroix Racing Team	(Switzerland) Jean-Denis Délétraz (France) Fabien Giroix (France) Didier Cottaz	BMW S70 6.1L V12	**MI**	45
50 DNF	GT2	59	(France) Raymond Touroul	(France) Raymond Touroul (France) Didier Ortion (France) Jean-Claude Lagniez	Porsche 911 GT2	?	37
50 DNF	GT2	59	(France) Raymond Touroul	(France) Raymond Touroul (France) Didier Ortion (France) Jean-Claude Lagniez	Porsche 3.6L Turbo Flat-6	?	37
51 DNF	GT2	93	(United Kingdom) New Hardware Parr Motorsport	(United Kingdom) Hugh Price (United Kingdom) John Robinson (United Kingdom) Peter Owen	Porsche 911 GT2	**P**	28
51 DNF	GT2	93	(United Kingdom) New Hardware Parr Motorsport	(United Kingdom) Hugh Price (United Kingdom) John Robinson (United Kingdom) Peter Owen	Porsche 3.6L Turbo Flat-6	**P**	28
52 DNF	GT2	91	(France) V de V Racing Team	(Belgium) Eric van de Vyver (Belgium) Philippe Adams	Gillet Vertigo	**MI**	15
52 DNF	GT2	91	(France) V de V Racing Team	(Belgium) Eric van de Vyver (Belgium) Philippe Adams	Ford Cosworth YB 2.0L Turbo I4	**MI**	15
53 DNF	GT1	21	(United Kingdom) Lotus Racing Team	(Netherlands) Mike Hezemans (United Kingdom) Alex Portman	Lotus Esprit V8 Turbo	**MI**	15
53 DNF	GT1	21	(United Kingdom) Lotus Racing Team	(Netherlands) Mike Hezemans (United Kingdom) Alex Portman	Lotus 3.5L Turbo V8	**MI**	15
54 DNF	GT2	73	(United Kingdom) Morgan Motor Company	(United Kingdom) Charles Morgan (United Kingdom) William Wykeham	Morgan Plus 8 GTR	**D**	1
54 DNF	GT2	73	(United Kingdom) Morgan Motor Company	(United Kingdom) Charles Morgan (United Kingdom) William Wykeham	Rover V8 5.0L V8	**D**	1

== Statistics ==
- Pole Position - (United Kingdom) Steve Soper (#24 Bigazzi Team SRL) - 1:47.044
- Fastest Lap - (France) Jean-Marc Gounon (#28 Ennea Igol) - 1:49.780

BPR Global GT Series
Previous race: 1996 BPR 4 Hours of Jarama	1996 season	Next race: 1996 BPR 4 Hours of Nürburgring
