= 1996 BPR 4 Hours of Jarama =

Motorsport race

Layout of the Jarama circuit

The 1996 BPR 4 Hours of Jarama was the third race of the 1996 BPR Global GT Series. It was run at the Circuito Permanente Del Jarama on 14 April 1996.

== Official results ==
Class winners in bold. Cars failing to complete 75% of winner's distance marked as Not Classified (NC).

Pos	Class	No	Team	Drivers	Chassis	Tyre	Laps
Pos	Class	No	Team	Drivers	Engine	Tyre	Laps
1	**GT1**	**2**	**(United Kingdom) Gulf Racing (United Kingdom) GTC Motorsport**	**(United Kingdom) Ray Bellm (United Kingdom) James Weaver**	**McLaren F1 GTR**	**MI**	**147**
1	**GT1**	**2**	**(United Kingdom) Gulf Racing (United Kingdom) GTC Motorsport**	**(United Kingdom) Ray Bellm (United Kingdom) James Weaver**	**BMW S70 6.1L V12**	**MI**	**147**
2	GT1	6	(United Kingdom) Gulf Racing (United Kingdom) GTC Motorsport	(United Kingdom) Lindsay Owen-Jones (France) Pierre-Henri Raphanel	McLaren F1 GTR	**MI**	146
2	GT1	6	(United Kingdom) Gulf Racing (United Kingdom) GTC Motorsport	(United Kingdom) Lindsay Owen-Jones (France) Pierre-Henri Raphanel	BMW S70 6.1L V12	**MI**	146
3	GT1	28	(Italy) Ennea Igol	(France) Jean-Marc Gounon (France) Éric Bernard (France) Paul Belmondo	Ferrari F40 GTE	**P**	146
3	GT1	28	(Italy) Ennea Igol	(France) Jean-Marc Gounon (France) Éric Bernard (France) Paul Belmondo	Ferrari 3.5L Turbo V8	**P**	146
4	GT1	9	(France) Franck Muller Watches (France) Giroix Racing Team	(France) Fabien Giroix (Switzerland) Jean-Denis Délétraz (France) Didier Cottaz	McLaren F1 GTR	**MI**	145
4	GT1	9	(France) Franck Muller Watches (France) Giroix Racing Team	(France) Fabien Giroix (Switzerland) Jean-Denis Délétraz (France) Didier Cottaz	BMW S70 6.1L V12	**MI**	145
5	GT1	40	(France) Pilot Pen Racing	(France) Michel Ferté (France) Olivier Thévenin	Ferrari F40 LM	**MI**	144
5	GT1	40	(France) Pilot Pen Racing	(France) Michel Ferté (France) Olivier Thévenin	Ferrari 3.0L Turbo V8	**MI**	144
6	GT1	11	(Germany) Konrad Motorsport	(Austria) Franz Konrad (France) Bob Wollek	Porsche 911 GT2 Evo	**MI**	143
6	GT1	11	(Germany) Konrad Motorsport	(Austria) Franz Konrad (France) Bob Wollek	Porsche 3.6L Turbo Flat-6	**MI**	143
7	**GT2**	**83**	**(Netherlands) Marcos Racing International**	**(Netherlands) Cor Euser (Brazil) Thomas Erdos**	**Marcos LM600**	**D**	**142**
7	**GT2**	**83**	**(Netherlands) Marcos Racing International**	**(Netherlands) Cor Euser (Brazil) Thomas Erdos**	**Chevrolet 6.0L V8**	**D**	**142**
8	GT2	60	(Germany) Oberbayern Motorsport	(Germany) Jürgen von Gartzen (Netherlands) Patrick Huisman	Porsche 911 GT2	**P**	141
8	GT2	60	(Germany) Oberbayern Motorsport	(Germany) Jürgen von Gartzen (Netherlands) Patrick Huisman	Porsche 3.6L Turbo Flat-6	**P**	141
9	GT2	96	(France) Larbre Compétition	(France) Patrice Goueslard (Germany) André Ahrlé (Belgium) Michel Neugarten	Porsche 911 GT2	**MI**	140
9	GT2	96	(France) Larbre Compétition	(France) Patrice Goueslard (Germany) André Ahrlé (Belgium) Michel Neugarten	Porsche 3.6L Turbo Flat-6	**MI**	140
10	GT1	49	(Germany) Freisinger Motorsport	(Germany) Wolfgang Kaufmann (France) Richard Flammang	Porsche 911 GT2 Evo	**G**	140
10	GT1	49	(Germany) Freisinger Motorsport	(Germany) Wolfgang Kaufmann (France) Richard Flammang	Porsche 3.6L Turbo Flat-6	**G**	140
11	GT2	92	(United Kingdom) New Hardware Parr Motorsport	(New Zealand) Bill Farmer (United Kingdom) Robert Nearn (France) Stéphane Ortelli	Porsche 911 GT2	**P**	139
11	GT2	92	(United Kingdom) New Hardware Parr Motorsport	(New Zealand) Bill Farmer (United Kingdom) Robert Nearn (France) Stéphane Ortelli	Porsche 3.6L Turbo Flat-6	**P**	139
12	GT2	64	(United Kingdom) Lanzante Motorsport	(United Kingdom) Soames Langton (United States) Paul Burdell (Sweden) Stanley Dickens	Porsche 911 GT2	**MI**	139
12	GT2	64	(United Kingdom) Lanzante Motorsport	(United Kingdom) Soames Langton (United States) Paul Burdell (Sweden) Stanley Dickens	Porsche 3.6L Turbo Flat-6	**MI**	139
13	GT2	78	(Germany) Seikel Motorsport	(Austria) Helmut König (Austria) Hermann Duller	Porsche 911 GT2	**P**	138
13	GT2	78	(Germany) Seikel Motorsport	(Austria) Helmut König (Austria) Hermann Duller	Porsche 3.6L Turbo Flat-6	**P**	138
14	GT2	56	(Germany) Roock Racing	(Switzerland) Bruno Eichmann (Germany) Gerd Ruch	Porsche 911 GT2	**MI**	138
14	GT2	56	(Germany) Roock Racing	(Switzerland) Bruno Eichmann (Germany) Gerd Ruch	Porsche 3.6L Turbo Flat-6	**MI**	138
15	GT2	52	(Germany) Krauss Rennsporttechnik	(Germany) Bernhard Müller (Germany) Michael Trunk	Porsche 911 GT2	**P**	137
15	GT2	52	(Germany) Krauss Rennsporttechnik	(Germany) Bernhard Müller (Germany) Michael Trunk	Porsche 3.6L Turbo Flat-6	**P**	137
16	GT2	99	(Switzerland) Elf Haberthur Racing	(France) Ferdinand de Lesseps (France) Philippe Charriol (France) Bruno Ilien	Porsche 911 GT2	**P**	136
16	GT2	99	(Switzerland) Elf Haberthur Racing	(France) Ferdinand de Lesseps (France) Philippe Charriol (France) Bruno Ilien	Porsche 3.6L Turbo Flat-6	**P**	136
17	GT1	5	(France) Éric Graham	(France) Éric Graham (France) Michel Faraut (France) David Velay	Venturi 600 LM	**D**	136
17	GT1	5	(France) Éric Graham	(France) Éric Graham (France) Michel Faraut (France) David Velay	Renault PRV 3.0L V6 Turbo	**D**	136
18	GT2	84	(Italy) Promosport Italia	(Italy) Renato Mastropietro (Italy) Vincenzo Polli (Italy) Andrea Barenghi	Porsche 911 GT2	**P**	136
18	GT2	84	(Italy) Promosport Italia	(Italy) Renato Mastropietro (Italy) Vincenzo Polli (Italy) Andrea Barenghi	Porsche 3.6L Turbo Flat-6	**P**	136
19	GT2	79	(Portugal) Team Jumbo Pão de Açúcar (Germany) Seikel Motorsport	(Portugal) Pedro Mello Breyner (Portugal) Manuel Mello Breyner (Portugal) Tomaz Mello Breyner	Porsche 911 GT2	**P**	136
19	GT2	79	(Portugal) Team Jumbo Pão de Açúcar (Germany) Seikel Motorsport	(Portugal) Pedro Mello Breyner (Portugal) Manuel Mello Breyner (Portugal) Tomaz Mello Breyner	Porsche 3.6L Turbo Flat-6	**P**	136
20	GT2	50	(Switzerland) Stadler Motorsport	(Switzerland) Uwe Sick (Switzerland) Charles Margueron	Porsche 911 GT2	**P**	135
20	GT2	50	(Switzerland) Stadler Motorsport	(Switzerland) Uwe Sick (Switzerland) Charles Margueron	Porsche 3.6L Turbo Flat-6	**P**	135
21	GT1	1	(United Kingdom) West Competition (United Kingdom) David Price Racing	(Denmark) John Nielsen (Germany) Thomas Bscher	McLaren F1 GTR	**G**	135
21	GT1	1	(United Kingdom) West Competition (United Kingdom) David Price Racing	(Denmark) John Nielsen (Germany) Thomas Bscher	BMW S70 6.1L V12	**G**	135
22	GT1	8	(France) BBA Compétition	(Spain) Javier Camp (Netherlands) Hans Hugenholtz (France) Jean-Luc Maury-Laribière	McLaren F1 GTR	**D**	134
22	GT1	8	(France) BBA Compétition	(Spain) Javier Camp (Netherlands) Hans Hugenholtz (France) Jean-Luc Maury-Laribière	BMW S70 6.1L V12	**D**	134
23	GT1	16	(Austria) Karl Augustin	(Austria) Karl Augustin (Germany) Ernst Gschwender	Porsche 911 GT2 Cetoni	**G**	133
23	GT1	16	(Austria) Karl Augustin	(Austria) Karl Augustin (Germany) Ernst Gschwender	Porsche 3.6L Turbo Flat-6	**G**	133
24	GT2	65	(Germany) Roock Racing	(France) François Lafon (France) Lucien Guitteny (France) Jean-Marc Smadja	Porsche 911 GT2	**MI**	133
24	GT2	65	(Germany) Roock Racing	(France) François Lafon (France) Lucien Guitteny (France) Jean-Marc Smadja	Porsche 3.6L Turbo Flat-6	**MI**	133
25	GT2	80	M2 Team; Porsche Club Belgium	(Belgium) Thierry van Dalen (Belgium) Leo van Sande	Porsche 911 GT2	**P**	130
25	GT2	80	M2 Team; Porsche Club Belgium	(Belgium) Thierry van Dalen (Belgium) Leo van Sande	Porsche 3.6L Turbo Flat-6	**P**	130
26	GT2	51	(Germany) Proton Competition	(France) Patrick Vuillaume (France) Christian Pellieux	Porsche 911 GT2	**P**	130
26	GT2	51	(Germany) Proton Competition	(France) Patrick Vuillaume (France) Christian Pellieux	Porsche 3.6L Turbo Flat-6	**P**	130
27	GT2	81	M2 Team; Porsche Club Belgium	(Belgium) Eddy van der Pluym (Belgium) Guy Grammet	Porsche 911 GT2	**P**	129
27	GT2	81	M2 Team; Porsche Club Belgium	(Belgium) Eddy van der Pluym (Belgium) Guy Grammet	Porsche 3.6L Turbo Flat-6	**P**	129
28	GT2	53	(Switzerland) Yellow Racing	(France) Christian Heinkelé (Sweden) Tony Ring (Switzerland) Jean Gay	Ferrari F355 GT	**MI**	128
28	GT2	53	(Switzerland) Yellow Racing	(France) Christian Heinkelé (Sweden) Tony Ring (Switzerland) Jean Gay	Ferrari F131 3.5L V8	**MI**	128
29	GT2	59	(France) Raymond Touroul	(France) Didier Ortion (France) Jean-Louis Ricci (France) Raymond Touroul	Porsche 911 GT2	?	127
29	GT2	59	(France) Raymond Touroul	(France) Didier Ortion (France) Jean-Louis Ricci (France) Raymond Touroul	Porsche 3.6L Turbo Flat-6	?	127
30	GT2	75	(United Kingdom) Agusta Racing Team	(Italy) Rocky Agusta (France) Philippe Smaniotto	Callaway Corvette Supernatural	**D**	124
30	GT2	75	(United Kingdom) Agusta Racing Team	(Italy) Rocky Agusta (France) Philippe Smaniotto	Chevrolet LT1 6.2L V8	**D**	124
31 DNF	GT1	3	(United Kingdom) Harrods Mach One Racing (United Kingdom) David Price Racing	(United Kingdom) Andy Wallace (France) Olivier Grouillard	McLaren F1 GTR	**G**	141
31 DNF	GT1	3	(United Kingdom) Harrods Mach One Racing (United Kingdom) David Price Racing	(United Kingdom) Andy Wallace (France) Olivier Grouillard	BMW S70 6.1L V12	**G**	141
32 DNF	GT1	27	(Italy) Ennea Igol	(Italy) Luciano Della Noce (Sweden) Anders Olofsson	Ferrari F40 GTE	**P**	134
32 DNF	GT1	27	(Italy) Ennea Igol	(Italy) Luciano Della Noce (Sweden) Anders Olofsson	Ferrari 3.5L Turbo V8	**P**	134
33 DNF	GT1	47	(France) Larbre Compétition	(France) Jean-Luc Chéreau (Spain) Jesús Pareja (France) Jack Leconte	Porsche 911 GT2 Evo	**P**	131
33 DNF	GT1	47	(France) Larbre Compétition	(France) Jean-Luc Chéreau (Spain) Jesús Pareja (France) Jack Leconte	Porsche 3.6L Turbo Flat-6	**P**	131
34 DNF	GT2	69	(Germany) Proton Competition	(Germany) Peter Erl (Germany) Gerold Ried (Germany) Andy Bovensiepen	Porsche 911 GT2	**P**	127
34 DNF	GT2	69	(Germany) Proton Competition	(Germany) Peter Erl (Germany) Gerold Ried (Germany) Andy Bovensiepen	Porsche 3.6L Turbo Flat-6	**P**	127
35 DNF	GT2	87	(Germany) RWS Brun Motorsport	(Italy) Raffaele Sangiuolo (Netherlands) Duncan Huisman	Porsche 911 GT2	**P**	122
35 DNF	GT2	87	(Germany) RWS Brun Motorsport	(Italy) Raffaele Sangiuolo (Netherlands) Duncan Huisman	Porsche 3.6L Turbo Flat-6	**P**	122
36 DNF	GT1	7	(United Kingdom) G-Force Racing	(United Kingdom) John Greasley (United Kingdom) John Morrison	Porsche 911 GT2 Evo	**P**	117
36 DNF	GT1	7	(United Kingdom) G-Force Racing	(United Kingdom) John Greasley (United Kingdom) John Morrison	Porsche 3.6L Turbo Flat-6	**P**	117
37 DNF	GT2	55	(Switzerland) Stadler Motorsport	(Switzerland) Lilian Bryner (Switzerland) Enzo Calderari	Porsche 911 GT2	**P**	101
37 DNF	GT2	55	(Switzerland) Stadler Motorsport	(Switzerland) Lilian Bryner (Switzerland) Enzo Calderari	Porsche 3.6L Turbo Flat-6	**P**	101
38 DNF	GT2	57	(Germany) Freisinger Motorsport	(Austria) Manfred Jurasz (Belgium) Marc Schoonbroodt	Porsche 911 GT2	**G**	97
38 DNF	GT2	57	(Germany) Freisinger Motorsport	(Austria) Manfred Jurasz (Belgium) Marc Schoonbroodt	Porsche 3.6L Turbo Flat-6	**G**	97
39 DNF	GT1	4	(Germany) Roock Racing	(France) Jean-Pierre Jarier (Germany) Altfrid Heger	Porsche 911 GT2 Evo	**MI**	97
39 DNF	GT1	4	(Germany) Roock Racing	(France) Jean-Pierre Jarier (Germany) Altfrid Heger	Porsche 3.6L Turbo Flat-6	**MI**	97
40 DNF	GT1	43	(France) JCB Racing (France) Raymond Touroul	(France) Jean-Claude Basso (France) Henri Pescarolo	Venturi 600 LM	**D**	97
40 DNF	GT1	43	(France) JCB Racing (France) Raymond Touroul	(France) Jean-Claude Basso (France) Henri Pescarolo	Renault PRV 3.0L V6 Turbo	**D**	97
41 DNF	GT1	17	(France) Viper Team Oreca	(France) Philippe Gache (France) Éric Hélary	Chrysler Viper GTS-R	**MI**	77
41 DNF	GT1	17	(France) Viper Team Oreca	(France) Philippe Gache (France) Éric Hélary	Chrysler 8.0L V10	**MI**	77
42 DNF	GT2	91	(France) V de V Racing Team	(France) Eric van de Vyver (Belgium) Philippe Adams	Gillet Vertigo	**MI**	60
42 DNF	GT2	91	(France) V de V Racing Team	(France) Eric van de Vyver (Belgium) Philippe Adams	Ford Cosworth YB 2.0L Turbo I4	**MI**	60
43 DNF	GT2	88	(Germany) Konrad Motorsport	(Switzerland) Toni Seiler (Brazil) André Lara Resende	Porsche 911 GT2	**MI**	54
43 DNF	GT2	88	(Germany) Konrad Motorsport	(Switzerland) Toni Seiler (Brazil) André Lara Resende	Porsche 3.6L Turbo Flat-6	**MI**	54
44 DNF	GT2	76	(United Kingdom) Agusta Racing Team	(Italy) Almo Coppelli (Italy) Marco Spinelli	Callaway Corvette Supernatural	**D**	45
44 DNF	GT2	76	(United Kingdom) Agusta Racing Team	(Italy) Almo Coppelli (Italy) Marco Spinelli	Chevrolet LT1 6.2L V8	**D**	45
45 DNF	GT1	20	(France) Venturi Team Lécuyer	(Switzerland) Laurent Lécuyer (Switzerland) Philippe Favre (Switzerland) Bernard Chauvin	Venturi 600 SLM	**MI**	43
45 DNF	GT1	20	(France) Venturi Team Lécuyer	(Switzerland) Laurent Lécuyer (Switzerland) Philippe Favre (Switzerland) Bernard Chauvin	Renault PRV 3.0L V6 Turbo	**MI**	43
46 DNF	GT1	29	(Italy) Ferrari Club Italia (Italy) Ennea SRL	(Italy) Luca Drudi (Italy) Piero Nappi (Italy) Mauro Martini	Ferrari F40 GTE	**P**	41
46 DNF	GT1	29	(Italy) Ferrari Club Italia (Italy) Ennea SRL	(Italy) Luca Drudi (Italy) Piero Nappi (Italy) Mauro Martini	Ferrari 3.5L Turbo V8	**P**	41
47 DNF	GT1	22	(United Kingdom) Lotus Racing	(Netherlands) Jan Lammers (United Kingdom) Perry McCarthy	Lotus Esprit V8 Turbo	**MI**	35
47 DNF	GT1	22	(United Kingdom) Lotus Racing	(Netherlands) Jan Lammers (United Kingdom) Perry McCarthy	Lotus 3.5L Turbo V8	**MI**	35
48 DNF	GT1	21	(United Kingdom) Lotus Racing	(Netherlands) Mike Hezemans (United Kingdom) Alexander Portman	Lotus Esprit V8 Turbo	**MI**	32
48 DNF	GT1	21	(United Kingdom) Lotus Racing	(Netherlands) Mike Hezemans (United Kingdom) Alexander Portman	Lotus 3.5L Turbo V8	**MI**	32
49 DNF	GT1	14	(Germany) Repsol Kremer Racing	(Spain) Tomás Saldaña (Spain) Alfonso de Orleans Bourbon (France) Christophe Bouchut	Porsche 911 GT2 Evo	**G**	18
49 DNF	GT1	14	(Germany) Repsol Kremer Racing	(Spain) Tomás Saldaña (Spain) Alfonso de Orleans Bourbon (France) Christophe Bouchut	Porsche 3.6L Turbo Flat-6	**G**	18
DNS	GT1	30	(France) Quattro Pilotage	(France) Thierry Guiod (France) Patrick Pelissier	Porsche 911 Bi-Turbo	?	-
DNS	GT1	30	(France) Quattro Pilotage	(France) Thierry Guiod (France) Patrick Pelissier	Porsche 3.6L Turbo Flat-6	?	-
DNS	GT1	48	(Germany) Freisinger Motorsport	(Spain) Emilio de Villota (Switzerland) Clay Regazzoni (Italy) Fulvio Ballabio	Porsche 911 Bi-Turbo	**G**	-
DNS	GT1	48	(Germany) Freisinger Motorsport	(Spain) Emilio de Villota (Switzerland) Clay Regazzoni (Italy) Fulvio Ballabio	Porsche 3.8L Turbo Flat-6	**G**	-
DNQ	GT2	73	(United Kingdom) Morgan Motor Company	(United Kingdom) Charles Morgan (United Kingdom) William Wykeham	Morgan Plus 8 GTR	**D**	-
DNQ	GT2	73	(United Kingdom) Morgan Motor Company	(United Kingdom) Charles Morgan (United Kingdom) William Wykeham	Rover V8 5.0L V8	**D**	-

== Statistics ==
- Pole Position - (France) Olivier Grouillard (#3 Harrods Mach One Racing) - 1:30.053
- Fastest Lap - (France) Jean-Marc Gounon (#28 Ennea Igol) - 1:33.345

BPR Global GT Series
Previous race: 1996 BPR 4 Hours of Monza	1996 season	Next race: 1996 BPR 4 Hours of Silverstone
