= 1996 BPR 4 Hours of Anderstorp =

Layout of the Anderstorp Raceway (1978-1997)

The 1996 BPR 4 Hours of Anderstorp was the sixth round of the 1996 BPR Global GT Series season.

== Results ==
Class winners in bold. Cars failing to complete 75% of winner's distance marked as Not Classified (NC).

Pos	Class	No.	Team	Drivers	Chassis	Tyre	Laps
Pos	Class	No.	Team	Drivers	Engine	Tyre	Laps
1	**GT1**	**27**	**(Italy) Ennea Igol**	**(Sweden) Anders Olofsson (Italy) Luciano Della Noce**	**Ferrari F40 GTE**	P	**151**
1	**GT1**	**27**	**(Italy) Ennea Igol**	**(Sweden) Anders Olofsson (Italy) Luciano Della Noce**	Ferrari 3.5L Turbo V8	P	**151**
2	GT1	6	(United Kingdom) Gulf Racing (United Kingdom) GTC Motorsport	(United Kingdom) Lindsay Owen-Jones (France) Pierre-Henri Raphanel	McLaren F1 GTR	MI	151
2	GT1	6	(United Kingdom) Gulf Racing (United Kingdom) GTC Motorsport	(United Kingdom) Lindsay Owen-Jones (France) Pierre-Henri Raphanel	BMW S70 6.1L V12	MI	151
3	GT1	2	(United Kingdom) Gulf Racing (United Kingdom) GTC Motorsport	(United Kingdom) Ray Bellm (United Kingdom) James Weaver	McLaren F1 GTR	MI	149
3	GT1	2	(United Kingdom) Gulf Racing (United Kingdom) GTC Motorsport	(United Kingdom) Ray Bellm (United Kingdom) James Weaver	BMW S70 6.1L V12	MI	149
4	GT1	3	(United Kingdom) Harrods Racing (United Kingdom) David Price Racing	(United Kingdom) Andy Wallace (France) Olivier Grouillard	McLaren F1 GTR	G	149
4	GT1	3	(United Kingdom) Harrods Racing (United Kingdom) David Price Racing	(United Kingdom) Andy Wallace (France) Olivier Grouillard	BMW S70 6.1L V12	G	149
5	GT1	1	(United Kingdom) West Competition (United Kingdom) David Price Racing	(Denmark) John Nielsen (Germany) Thomas Bscher	McLaren F1 GTR	G	148
5	GT1	1	(United Kingdom) West Competition (United Kingdom) David Price Racing	(Denmark) John Nielsen (Germany) Thomas Bscher	BMW S70 6.1L V12	G	148
6	GT1	21	(United Kingdom) Lotus Racing Team	(Netherlands) Mike Hezemans (United Kingdom) Alex Portman	Lotus Esprit V8	MI	147
6	GT1	21	(United Kingdom) Lotus Racing Team	(Netherlands) Mike Hezemans (United Kingdom) Alex Portman	Lotus 3.5L Turbo V8	MI	147
7	**GT2**	**56**	**(Germany) Roock Racing**	**(Switzerland) Bruno Eichmann (Belgium) Michel Neugarten (Germany) Gerd Ruch**	**Porsche 911 GT2**	MI	**146**
7	**GT2**	**56**	**(Germany) Roock Racing**	**(Switzerland) Bruno Eichmann (Belgium) Michel Neugarten (Germany) Gerd Ruch**	Porsche 3.6L Turbo Flat-6	MI	**146**
8	GT2	88	(Germany) Konrad Motorsport	(Switzerland) Toni Seiler (France) Stéphane Ortelli	Porsche 911 GT2	MI	145
8	GT2	88	(Germany) Konrad Motorsport	(Switzerland) Toni Seiler (France) Stéphane Ortelli	Porsche 3.6L Turbo Flat-6	MI	145
9	GT2	64	(United Kingdom) Lanzante Motorsport	(United States) Paul Burdell (United Kingdom) Soames Langton	Porsche 911 GT2	MI	144
9	GT2	64	(United Kingdom) Lanzante Motorsport	(United States) Paul Burdell (United Kingdom) Soames Langton	Porsche 3.6L Turbo Flat-6	MI	144
10	GT2	75	(United Kingdom) Agusta Racing Team	(Italy) Almo Coppelli (Italy) Marco Spinelli	Callaway Corvette LM-GT	D	144
10	GT2	75	(United Kingdom) Agusta Racing Team	(Italy) Almo Coppelli (Italy) Marco Spinelli	Chevrolet LT1 6.2L V8	D	144
11	GT2	55	(Switzerland) Stadler Motorsport	(Switzerland) Lilian Bryner (Switzerland) Enzo Calderari	Porsche 911 GT2	P	144
11	GT2	55	(Switzerland) Stadler Motorsport	(Switzerland) Lilian Bryner (Switzerland) Enzo Calderari	Porsche 3.6L Turbo Flat-6	P	144
12	GT2	52	(Germany) Krauß Rennsporttechnik	(Germany) Bernhard Müller (Germany) Michael Trunk	Porsche 911 GT2		143
12	GT2	52	(Germany) Krauß Rennsporttechnik	(Germany) Bernhard Müller (Germany) Michael Trunk	Porsche 3.6L Turbo Flat-6		143
13	GT2	50	(Switzerland) Stadler Motorsport	(Switzerland) Uwe Sick (Italy) Luigino Pagotto	Porsche 911 GT2	P	140
13	GT2	50	(Switzerland) Stadler Motorsport	(Switzerland) Uwe Sick (Italy) Luigino Pagotto	Porsche 3.6L Turbo Flat-6	P	140
14	GT2	87	(Germany) RWS Brun Motorsport	(Italy) Raffaele Sangiuolo (Germany) Gottfried Rampl (Austria) Hans-Jörg Hofer	Porsche 911 GT2	P	139
14	GT2	87	(Germany) RWS Brun Motorsport	(Italy) Raffaele Sangiuolo (Germany) Gottfried Rampl (Austria) Hans-Jörg Hofer	Porsche 3.6L Turbo Flat-6	P	139
15	GT2	77	(Germany) Seikel Motorsport	(Germany) Hermann Bilz (France) Jacques Corbet (Germany) Peter Seikel	Porsche 911 GT2	P	135
15	GT2	77	(Germany) Seikel Motorsport	(Germany) Hermann Bilz (France) Jacques Corbet (Germany) Peter Seikel	Porsche 3.6L Turbo Flat-6	P	135
16	GT2	85	(Italy) Gianluigi Locatelli	(Italy) Gianluigi Locatelli (Italy) Leonardo Maddalena	Porsche 993 Supercup		134
16	GT2	85	(Italy) Gianluigi Locatelli	(Italy) Gianluigi Locatelli (Italy) Leonardo Maddalena	Porsche 3.8L Flat-6		134
17 NC	GT2	53	(Switzerland) Yellow Racing	(France) Christian Heinkelé (Sweden) Tony Ring (Switzerland) Jean Gay	Ferrari F355 GT	MI	118
17 NC	GT2	53	(Switzerland) Yellow Racing	(France) Christian Heinkelé (Sweden) Tony Ring (Switzerland) Jean Gay	Ferrari 3.5L V8	MI	118
18 NC	GT1	28	(Italy) Ennea Igol	(France) Jean-Marc Gounon (France) Éric Bernard (France) Paul Belmondo	Ferrari F40 GTE	P	117
18 NC	GT1	28	(Italy) Ennea Igol	(France) Jean-Marc Gounon (France) Éric Bernard (France) Paul Belmondo	Ferrari 3.5L Turbo V8	P	117
19 DNF	GT2	69	(Germany) Proton Competition	(Germany) Peter Erl (Germany) Gerold Ried (France) Patrick Vuillaume	Porsche 911 GT2	P	115
19 DNF	GT2	69	(Germany) Proton Competition	(Germany) Peter Erl (Germany) Gerold Ried (France) Patrick Vuillaume	Porsche 3.6L Turbo Flat-6	P	115
20 DNF	GT1	22	(United Kingdom) Lotus Racing Team	(Netherlands) Jan Lammers (United Kingdom) Charles Goodwin	Lotus Esprit V8	MI	93
20 DNF	GT1	22	(United Kingdom) Lotus Racing Team	(Netherlands) Jan Lammers (United Kingdom) Charles Goodwin	Lotus 3.5L Turbo V8	MI	93
21 DNF	GT2	65	(Germany) Roock Racing	(Monaco) Stefano Buttiero (Netherlands) Hans Hugenholtz	Porsche 911 GT2	MI	87
21 DNF	GT2	65	(Germany) Roock Racing	(Monaco) Stefano Buttiero (Netherlands) Hans Hugenholtz	Porsche 3.6L Turbo Flat-6	MI	87
22 DNF	GT1	11	(Germany) Konrad Motorsport	(Austria) Franz Konrad (France) Bob Wollek	Porsche 911 GT2 Evo	MI	63
22 DNF	GT1	11	(Germany) Konrad Motorsport	(Austria) Franz Konrad (France) Bob Wollek	Porsche 3.6L Turbo Flat-6	MI	63
23 DNF	GT2	96	(France) Larbre Compétition	(France) Patrice Goueslard (Germany) André Ahrle	Porsche 911 GT2	P	43
23 DNF	GT2	96	(France) Larbre Compétition	(France) Patrice Goueslard (Germany) André Ahrle	Porsche 3.6L Turbo Flat-6	P	43
24 DNF	GT1	8	(France) BBA Compétition	(France) Jean-Luc Maury-Laribière (France) Emmanuel Clérico	McLaren F1 GTR	D	39
24 DNF	GT1	8	(France) BBA Compétition	(France) Jean-Luc Maury-Laribière (France) Emmanuel Clérico	BMW S70 6.1L V12	D	39
25 DNF	GT1	35	(Sweden) JTI Motorsport	(Sweden) Koit Veertee (Sweden) Örnulf Wirdheim	Porsche 911 RSR Turbo		33
25 DNF	GT1	35	(Sweden) JTI Motorsport	(Sweden) Koit Veertee (Sweden) Örnulf Wirdheim	Porsche 3.6L Turbo Flat-6		33
26 DNF	GT2	73	(United Kingdom) Charles Morgan	(United Kingdom) Charles Morgan (United Kingdom) William Wykeham	Morgan Plus 8 GTR	D	32
26 DNF	GT2	73	(United Kingdom) Charles Morgan	(United Kingdom) Charles Morgan (United Kingdom) William Wykeham	Rover 5.0L V8	D	32
27 DNF	GT1	49	(Germany) Freisinger Motorsport	(Germany) Wolfgang Kaufmann (Germany) Jürgen Barth	Porsche 911 GT2 Evo	G	28
27 DNF	GT1	49	(Germany) Freisinger Motorsport	(Germany) Wolfgang Kaufmann (Germany) Jürgen Barth	Porsche 3.6L Turbo Flat-6	G	28
28 DNF	GT1	16	(Austria) Karl Augustin	(Austria) Karl Augustin (Germany) Ernst Gschwender	Porsche 911 Cetoni	P	24
28 DNF	GT1	16	(Austria) Karl Augustin	(Austria) Karl Augustin (Germany) Ernst Gschwender	Porsche 3.6L Turbo Flat-6	P	24
29 DNF	GT1	29	(Italy) Ennea (Italy) Ferrari Club Italia	(Italy) Piero Nappi (Italy) Max Angelelli	Ferrari F40 GTE	P	23
29 DNF	GT1	29	(Italy) Ennea (Italy) Ferrari Club Italia	(Italy) Piero Nappi (Italy) Max Angelelli	Ferrari 3.5L Turbo V8	P	23
30 DNF	GT2	83	(Netherlands) Marcos Racing International	(Netherlands) Cor Euser (Brazil) Thomas Erdos (France) Ferdinand de Lesseps	Marcos LM600	D	16
30 DNF	GT2	83	(Netherlands) Marcos Racing International	(Netherlands) Cor Euser (Brazil) Thomas Erdos (France) Ferdinand de Lesseps	Chevrolet 5.9L V8	D	16
31 DNF	GT1	4	(Germany) Roock Racing	(Germany) Ralf Kelleners (France) Jean-Pierre Jarier	Porsche 911 GT2 Evo	MI	12
31 DNF	GT1	4	(Germany) Roock Racing	(Germany) Ralf Kelleners (France) Jean-Pierre Jarier	Porsche 3.6L Turbo Flat-6	MI	12
DNS	GT2	66	(United Kingdom) EMKA Racing	(United Kingdom) Steve O'Rourke (United Kingdom) Guy Holmes	Porsche 911 GT2	D	-
DNS	GT2	66	(United Kingdom) EMKA Racing	(United Kingdom) Steve O'Rourke (United Kingdom) Guy Holmes	Porsche 3.6L Turbo Flat-6	D	-
DNS	GT2	99	(Switzerland) Elf Haberthur Racing	(France) Ferdinand de Lesseps (France) Richard Balandras	Porsche 911 GT2	P	-
DNS	GT2	99	(Switzerland) Elf Haberthur Racing	(France) Ferdinand de Lesseps (France) Richard Balandras	Porsche 3.6L Turbo Flat-6	P	-

BPR Global GT Series
Previous race: 1996 BPR 4 Hours of Nürburgring	1996 season	Next race: 1996 BPR 1000km of Suzuka

== Statistics ==
- Pole Position - (France) Jean-Marc Gounon (#28 Ennea Igol) - 1:28.668
- Fastest Lap - (France) Jean-Marc Gounon (#28 Ennea Igol) - 1:30.344
