= Rocky Agusta =

Italian race car driver and aristocrat (1950–2018)

Riccardo "Rocky" Agusta (21 October 1950 in Milan – 10 January 2018 St. Moritz) was an Italian race car driver and aristocrat. He was an heir to the Agusta and MV Agusta aviation and motorcycle firms, running the motorcycle racing team in the 1970s. He was responsible for funding the development of the Venturi 400 into a racing car, entering one for himself in the 1993 24 Hours of Le Mans and four cars in the 1994 24 Hours of Le Mans. He drove his own Callaway Corvettes in the BPR Global GT Series and the following FIA GT Championship in the 1990s. He returned for two races in 2004 with the Nash-Saleen team. He drove a Kremer K8 Spyder in the 1998 24 Hours of Le Mans, his last appearance in the race. He was also set to drive in the Le Mans Endurance Series for the Dallara-equipped Spinnaker team, but never raced. After his racing career, he lived in South Africa, investing in the mining industry.
