= Thomas Bscher =

German racing driver

Dr. Thomas Bscher (born 2 April 1952) is a German banker, businessman and former racing driver. Bscher was President of Bugatti Automobiles from 2003 to 2007, tasked with growing the company's customer base.

Bscher was considered instrumental in persuading (along with Ray Bellm) then-McLaren boss Ron Dennis to enter its F1 into a GT racing programme. Bscher also gained notoriety for making a claim that he commuted to work in his McLaren F1 at speeds in excess of 200 miles per hour (320 km/h) on the autobahn, which was verified by McLaren after analysis of his car's ECU.

== Complete 24 Hours of Le Mans results ==
24 Hours of Le Mans career
- Years: 1994–2000
- Teams: Seikel Motorsport, West Competition, David Price Racing, Gulf Team Davidoff, Thomas Bscher Promotion
- Best finish: 4th (1996)

Year	Team	Co-Drivers	Car	Car #	Class	Laps	Pos.	Class Pos.
1994	(Germany) Seikel Motorsport	(Denmark) John Nielsen (United Kingdom) Lindsay Owen-Jones	Porsche 968	58	LM GT2	84	DNF	DNF
1995	(United Kingdom) West Competition	(Denmark) John Nielsen (Germany) Jochen Mass	McLaren F1 GTR	49	LM GT1	131	DNF	DNF
1996	(United Kingdom) David Price Racing	(Denmark) John Nielsen (Netherlands) Peter Kox	McLaren F1 GTR	30	LM GT1	338	4th	3rd
1998	(United Kingdom) Gulf Team Davidoff	(Italy) Rinaldo Capello (Italy) Emanuele Pirro	McLaren F1 GTR	41	LM GT1	228	DNF	DNF
1999	(United Kingdom) David Price Racing	(United States) Bill Auberlen (United Kingdom) Steve Soper	BMW V12 LM	18	LM P	345	5th	4th
2000	(Germany) Thomas Bscher Promotion	(United Kingdom) Geoff Lees (France) Jean-Marc Gounon	BMW V12 LM	15	LM P 900	180	DNF	DNF

Sporting positions
Preceded by None (1994)	BPR Global GT Series; Champion; 1995 with: John Nielsen	Succeeded by Ray Bellm; James Weaver
