= Ferrari F40 =

Italian flagship sports car produced from 1987–1996

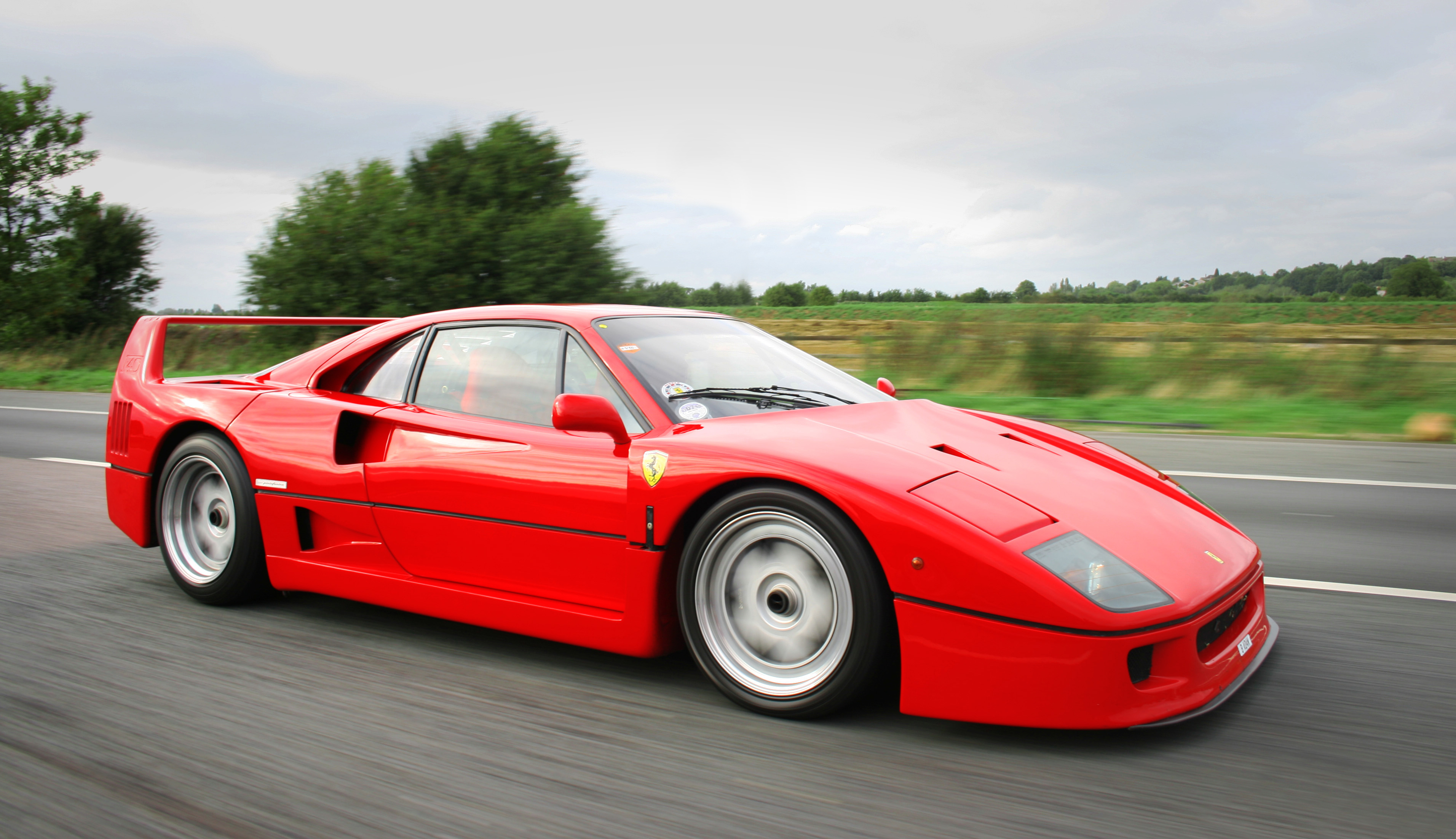

Overview
- Manufacturer: Ferrari S.p.A.
- Production: 1987–1996; 1,311 produced (including LM, Competizione, and GTE)
- Assembly: Italy: Maranello
- Designer: Pietro Camardella under the supervision of Aldo Brovarone at Pininfarina; Nicola Materazzi (Chief Engineer)

Body and chassis
- Class: Sports car (S)
- Body style: 2-door berlinetta
- Layout: Longitudinally-mounted, rear mid-engine, rear-wheel drive

Powertrain
- Engine: 2,936 cc (2.9 L) twin-turbocharged Tipo F120A/F120D 90° V8
- Power output: 478 PS (352 kW; 471 hp); 484 PS (356 kW; 477 hp) US-spec
- Transmission: 5-speed manual

Dimensions
- Wheelbase: 2,450 mm (96.5 in)
- Length: 4,430 mm (174.4 in)
- Width: 1,970 mm (77.6 in)
- Height: 1,124 mm (44.3 in)
- Kerb weight: 1,254 kg (2,765 lb) (Europe); 1,369 kg (3,018 lb) (US)

Chronology
- Predecessor: Ferrari 288 GTO
- Successor: Ferrari F50

The Ferrari F40 (Type F120) is a mid-engine, rear-wheel drive sports car engineered by Nicola Materazzi with styling by Pininfarina. It was built from 1987 until 1993, with the LM, Competizione, and GTE race car versions continuing production from 1994 to 1996 respectively. As the successor to the 288 GTO (also engineered by Materazzi), it was designed to celebrate Ferrari's 40th anniversary and was the last Ferrari automobile personally approved by Enzo Ferrari. At the time it was Ferrari's fastest, most powerful, and most expensive car for sale.

The car debuted with a planned production total of four hundred units and a factory suggested retail price of approximately US$400,000 (fivefold the price of its predecessor, the 288 GTO) in 1987 ($1,130,000 today). One of those that belonged to the Formula One driver Nigel Mansell was sold for the then record of £1 million in 1990, a record that stood into the 2010s. A total of 1,311 to 1,315 cars were manufactured with 213 units destined for the United States.

== Development ==
=== Origin ===
As early as 1984, Materazzi had proposed to Enzo Ferrari the idea of using the Group B 4-litre category (2.8-litre if turbocharged) to prove the performance of new road cars which with increased power could no longer safely display their performance on the road in the hands of regular buyers. Since Enzo Ferrari no longer had control over the production part of the business, Materazzi had to obtain permission from General Manager Eugenio Alzati. Permission was granted but only on the condition that work would take place outside of the Monday to Friday work week. A very small team thus developed the GTO Evoluzione on Saturdays to compete in the same class entered by the Porsche 959 in FIA Group B.

The FIA's move to end the Group B category for the 1986 season saw Enzo Ferrari leave with five 288 GTO Evoluzione development cars, and no series to enter them into. These were left for enthusiasts who might consider purchasing one until a validation driver convinced Enzo Ferrari that Materazzi could keep the base car concept alive and make it roadworthy. Ferrari's desire to leave a legacy in his final sports car allowed the Evoluzione program to be further developed to produce a car exclusively for road use. In particular, Ferrari had been impressed with the development of recent cars which claimed back much of the performance deficit inflicted by ever more restrictive emissions regulations.

In response to the quite simple, but very expensive car with relatively little out of the ordinary being called a "cynical money-making exercise" aimed at speculators, a figure from the Ferrari marketing department was quoted as saying "We wanted it to be very fast, sporting in the extreme and Spartan," "Customers had been saying our cars were becoming too plush and comfortable." "The F40 is for the most enthusiastic of our owners who want nothing but sheer performance. It isn't a laboratory for the future, as the 959 is. It is not Star Wars. And it wasn't created because Porsche built the 959. It would have happened anyway." In fact the reasons for the car's rawness and simplicity are very much linked to Materazzi's racing background (starting from the Stratos Gr.4, the Gr.5 Silhouette, then the Osella F2 and F1 cars, the 126C and eventually the 288 GTO).

The body of the F40 was designed by Pietro Camardella under the supervision of Aldo Brovarone of the Pininfarina design house. Nicola Materazzi meanwhile worked on evolutions of the engine, gearbox and other mechanical parts of the car to make them roadworthy. Many of these were well validated in the 288 GTO Evoluzione, from which the F40 takes many styling cues. From the beginning of the project on 10 June 1986, Enzo Ferrari asked for the car to be completed in a very short space of time (eleven months) and be presented in the summer of 1987. For this reason, he gave Materazzi permission to choose all the engineers on the team. Some of the development of the car, such as the bodywork was carried out at external companies like Michelotto.

=== Power, torque, and suspension ===
Power came from an enlarged, high-revving 2,936 cc (2.9 L; 179.2 cu in) version of the 288 GTO's four-stroke 90 degrees twin turbocharged and intercooled V8 engine generating a peak power output of 478 PS (471 hp; 352 kW) at 7,000 rpm and 577 N⋅m (426 lb⋅ft) of torque at 4,000 rpm as stated by the manufacturer. Gearing, torque curves, and actual power output differed among the cars. The F40 did without a catalytic converter until 1990, when US regulations made them a requirement for emissions control reasons. The flanking exhaust pipes guide exhaust gases from each bank of cylinders while the central pipe guides gases released from the wastegate of the turbochargers. The F40's twin-turbocharged V8 would be Ferrari's final forced induction engine until the California T in 2014.

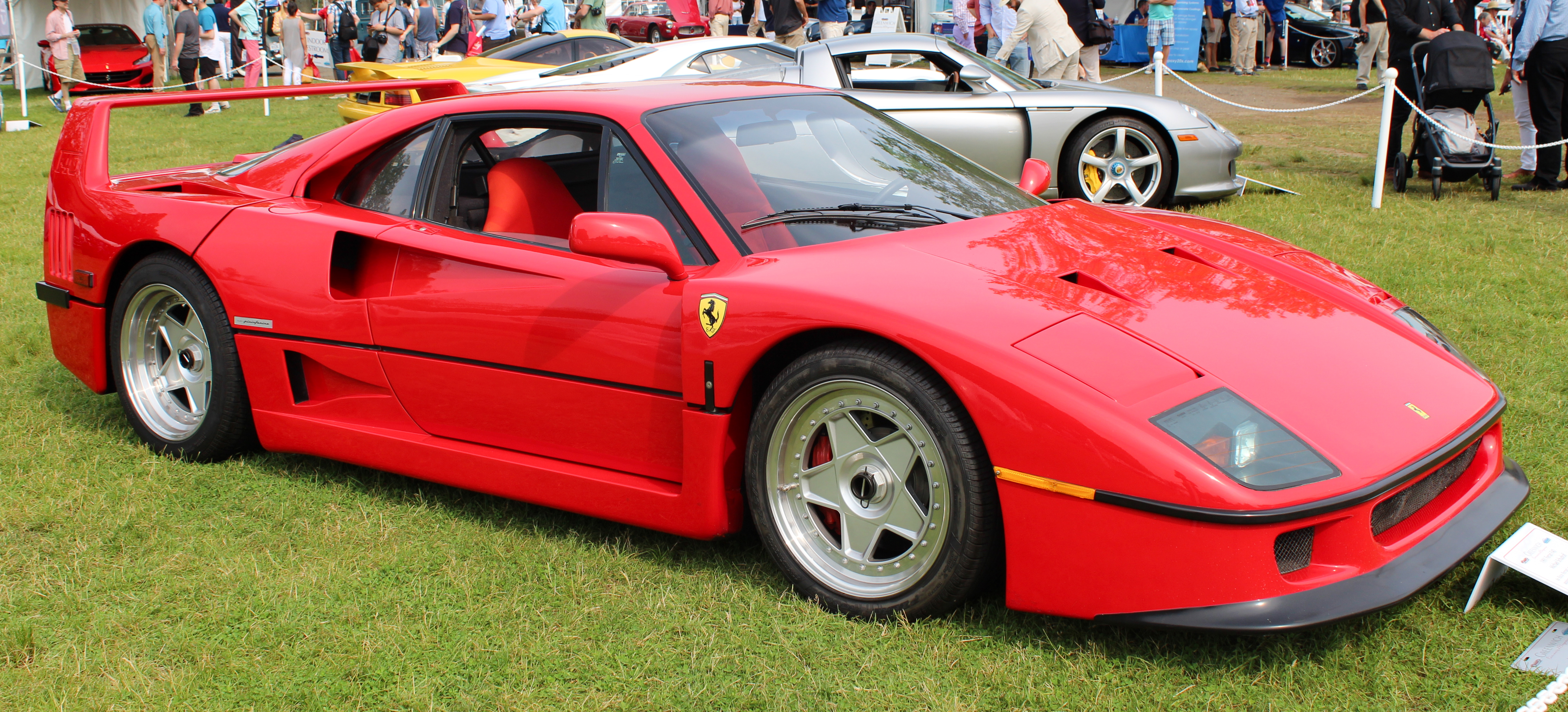
1991 Ferrari F40 (US spec)

The suspension setup was similar to the GTO's double wishbone setup, though many parts were upgraded and settings were changed; the unusually low ground clearance prompted Ferrari to include the ability to raise the vehicle's ground clearance when necessary for later cars via hydraulic lift chambers in the front dampers.

=== Body and interior ===
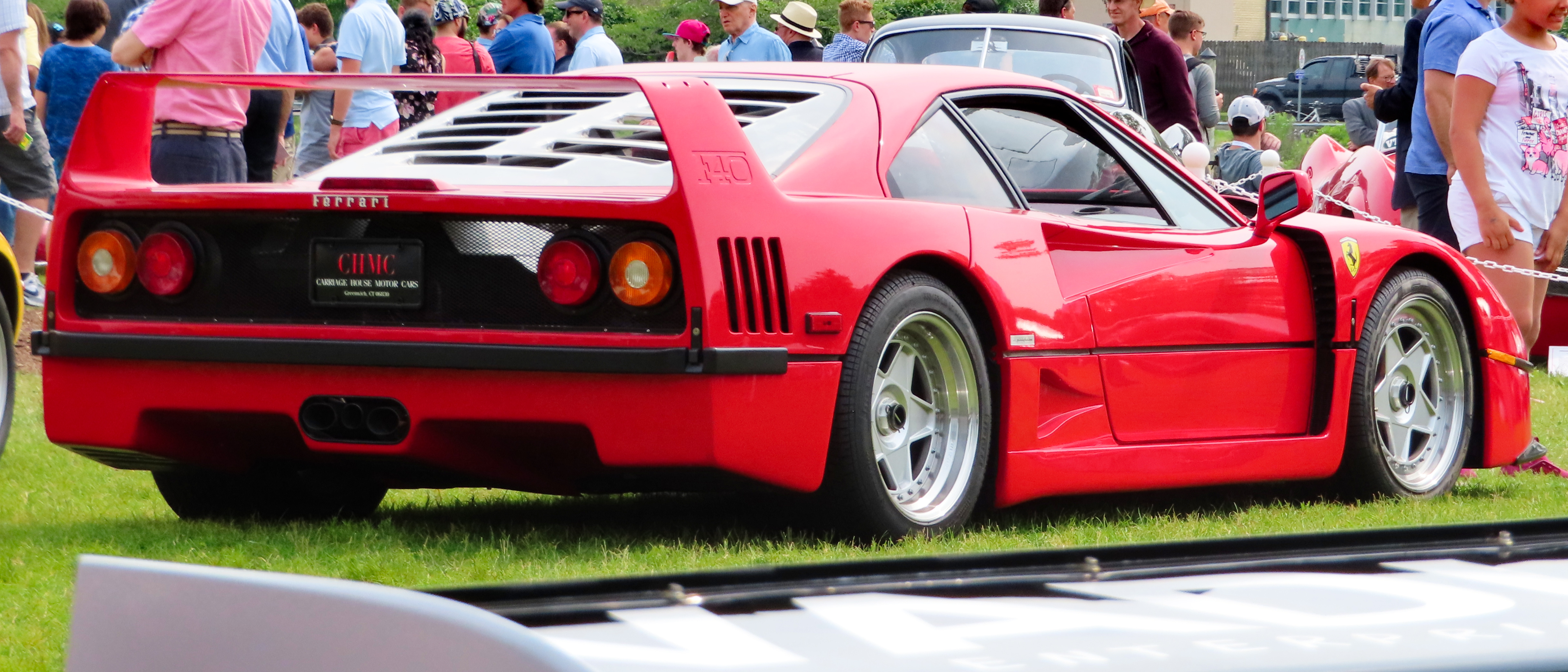
1991 Ferrari F40 (US spec), rear view

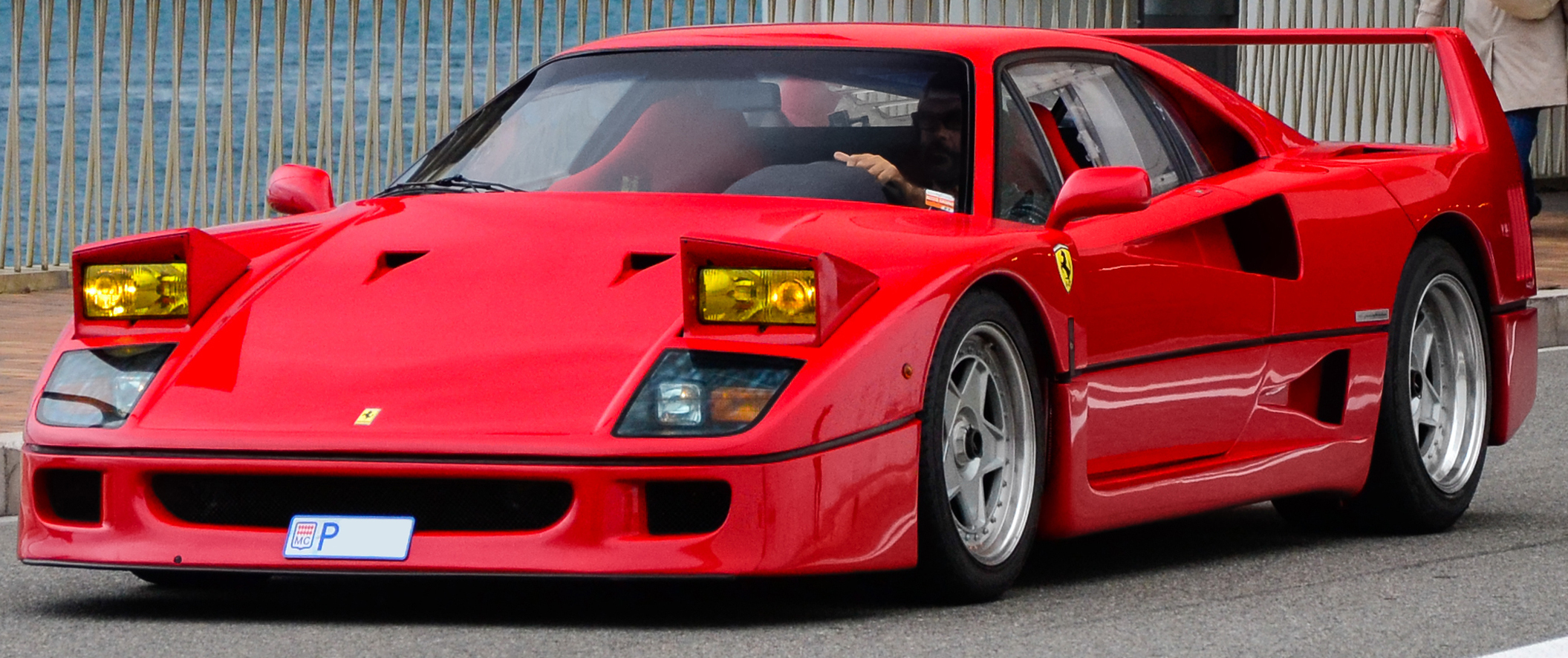
F40 with its retractable headlamps raised

The body was an entirely new design by Pininfarina featuring panels made of Kevlar, carbon fibre, and aluminium for strength and low weight, and intense aerodynamic testing employed. Weight was further minimised through the use of a polycarbonate plastic windshield and windows. The cars did have moderate air conditioning but had no sound system, door handles, glove box, leather trim, carpets, or door panels. The first fifty cars produced had sliding Lexan windows, while later cars were fitted with wind-down windows.

All cars left the factory in "Rosso Corsa" colour and left-hand drive. At least seven cars were modified and delivered to the Sultan of Brunei in right-hand drive. The Sultan employed Pininfarina's prototype manager Paolo Garella to make modifications to the car's colour, power, and interior comforts.

=== Aerodynamics ===
Cooling was important as forced induction engines generate significant amounts of heat. In order to dissipate the heat, the car was designed similarly to an open-wheel racing car with a body. It had a partial undertray to smooth airflow beneath the radiator, front section, and the cabin, and a second one with diffusers behind the engine, but the engine bay was not sealed. It has a drag coefficient of Cd=0.34.

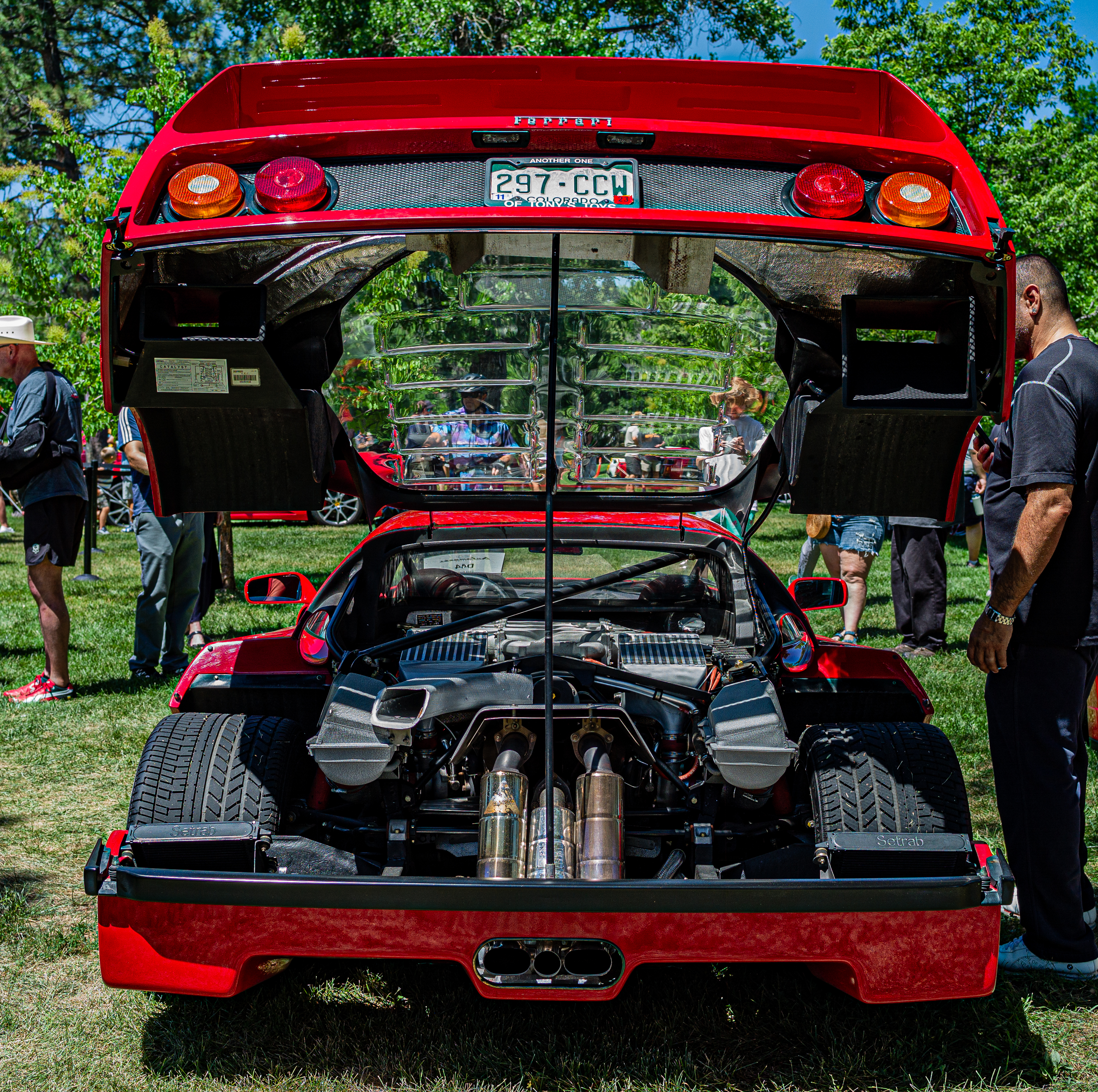
F40 rear clamshell open

=== Tyres ===
Because the car had an additional 78 PS (57 kW; 77 bhp) compared to the 288 GTO, a new tyre had to be developed to cope with the power levels which were more typically associated with racing cars. Materazzi contacted the Pirelli head of development Mario Mezzanotte, who he had known since the rallying years with the Lancia cars. Pirelli made a carcass with light materials (including Kevlar) after the experience gained in the Formula 1 seasons from 1980 to 1985 and asymmetrical tread patterns to create the P-Zero specifically for the F40.

=== Launch and promotion ===
The F40 was revealed on 21 July 1987 at the Civic Centre in Maranello. Originally the presentation was due to happen at the Frankfurt Motor Show according to Materazzi but Fiat needed to present the Alfa Romeo 164 at that show and the two would have clashed. Hence on insistence of Enzo Ferrari the launch was anticipated by more than two months. Counting from the project inception (June 1986) until the launch, the car was developed in thirteen months.

The promotion of the car was captured by the cameras in a documentary that included footage of Enzo Ferrari's past interviews, work inside the factory and the F40 driving through the streets of Modena. F1 driver Michele Alboreto drove the car on several occasions including a Christmas 1987 special programme for the Italian TV and journalist Ezio Zermiani when the car was filmed driving from Maranello to Milan.

== Racing ==
=== F40 LM ===
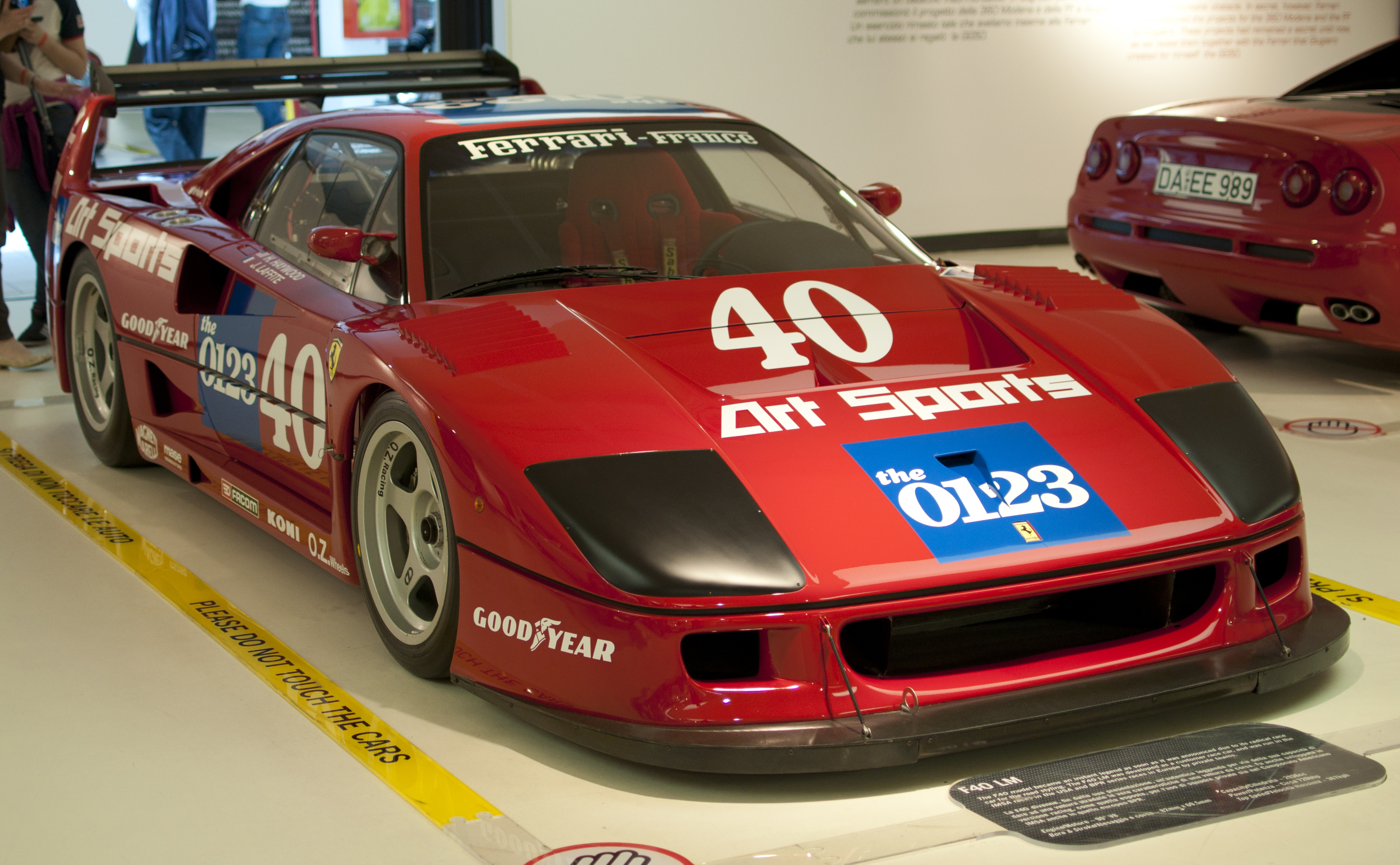
F40 LM on display at the Museo Ferrari

The racing cars were prepared by Michelotto (based in Padua) the Ferrari specialist who had already carried out work on the GTO Evoluzione and on parts of the road-going version of the F40.

Three chassis were prepared and two were used in races, with serial numbers 79890 and 79891. The third chassis, with serial number 88521, was a reserve car which stayed at Michelotto, in the end it was never raced.

The car saw competition on October 15th 1989 when it debuted in the Laguna Seca Raceway round of the IMSA, appearing in the GTO category, with an LM evolution model entered by Ferrari France, led by Jean Sage, driven by newly-crowned International F3000 champion and F1 newcomer Jean Alesi, finishing third to the two spaceframe, four-wheel drive Audi 90s and beating a host of other factory-backed spaceframe specials that dominated the races. In the following race, at Del Mar on 22 October 1989, Jean-Pierre Jabouille replaced Jean Alesi who was racing in the F1 Japanese GP. Jabouille had to retire after eighteen laps.

In 1990 Ferrari France took part in 6 of the 14 races of the IMSA GTO/GTU championship. Driven by a host of guest drivers such as Jean-Louis Schlesser, Jean-Pierre Jabouille, Jacques Laffite and Hurley Haywood, three second-places and one third-place were the best results.

Although the F40 would not return to IMSA in 1991, it would later be a popular choice by privateers to compete in numerous domestic GT series including JGTC.

In 1994, the car made its debut in international competitions, with one car campaigned in the BPR Global GT Series by Strandell, winning at the 4 Hours of Vallelunga.

In 1995, the number of F40s climbed to four, developed independently by Pilot-Aldix Racing (F40 LM) and Strandell (F40 GTE, racing under the Ferrari Club Italia banner), winning the 4 Hours of Anderstorp. No longer competitive against the newly entered McLaren F1 GTR, the Ferrari F40 returned for another year in 1996, managing to repeat the previous year's Anderstorp win, and from then on it was no longer seen in GT racing.

In total nineteen cars were produced.

=== F40 Competizione ===
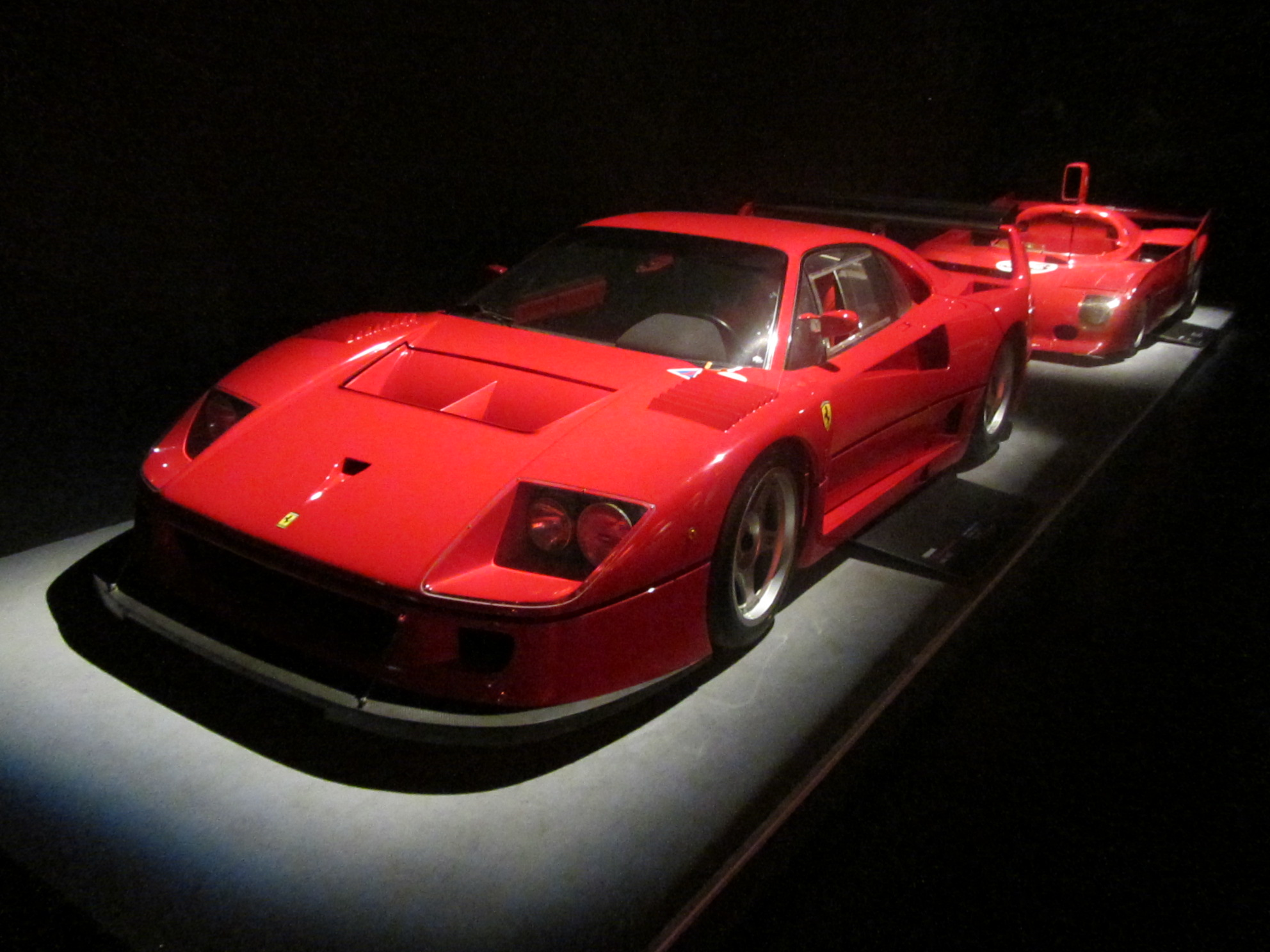
F40 Competizione on display at Museo dell'automobile di Torino

The F40 Competizione is a non-sponsored, more powerful version of the F40 LM, which was the result of consumer requests following the order of a French importer who wanted to enter one in the 24 Hours of Le Mans. Ten examples were built, all at customer request, the first two being called F40 LMs, and the remaining eight being F40 Competizione, as Ferrari felt that the LM tag was too restrictive.

The F40 Competizione is rated at 700 PS (515 kW; 691 hp) at 8,100 rpm from its upgraded twin-turbocharged V8 engine. The car can reportedly achieve a top speed of about 367 km/h (228 mph).

Chassis number 80782 was originally purchased as a road car and imported into the Netherlands in 1989 by the official Ferrari importer, Kroymans BV. Work was then done by Peter van Erp of Cavallino Tuning, Kroymans' racing division to convert it into "Competizione" specification, with new shock absorbers, new instrumentation, brakes, bodywork, and a new paint job. The car was consistently promoted through the Ferrari Challenge, and modifications in 1995 were made to maintain the car's competitiveness. Modifications were made by British tuning house G-Tex in collaboration with Michelotto and included air jacks, an upgraded roll hoop, and upgrades to the engine which increased its power output to over 710 PS (522 kW; 700 bhp). After the car was sold to its most recent owner, it had a decorative makeover which consisted of a repaint in grey and blue fabric seats.

=== F40 GTE ===
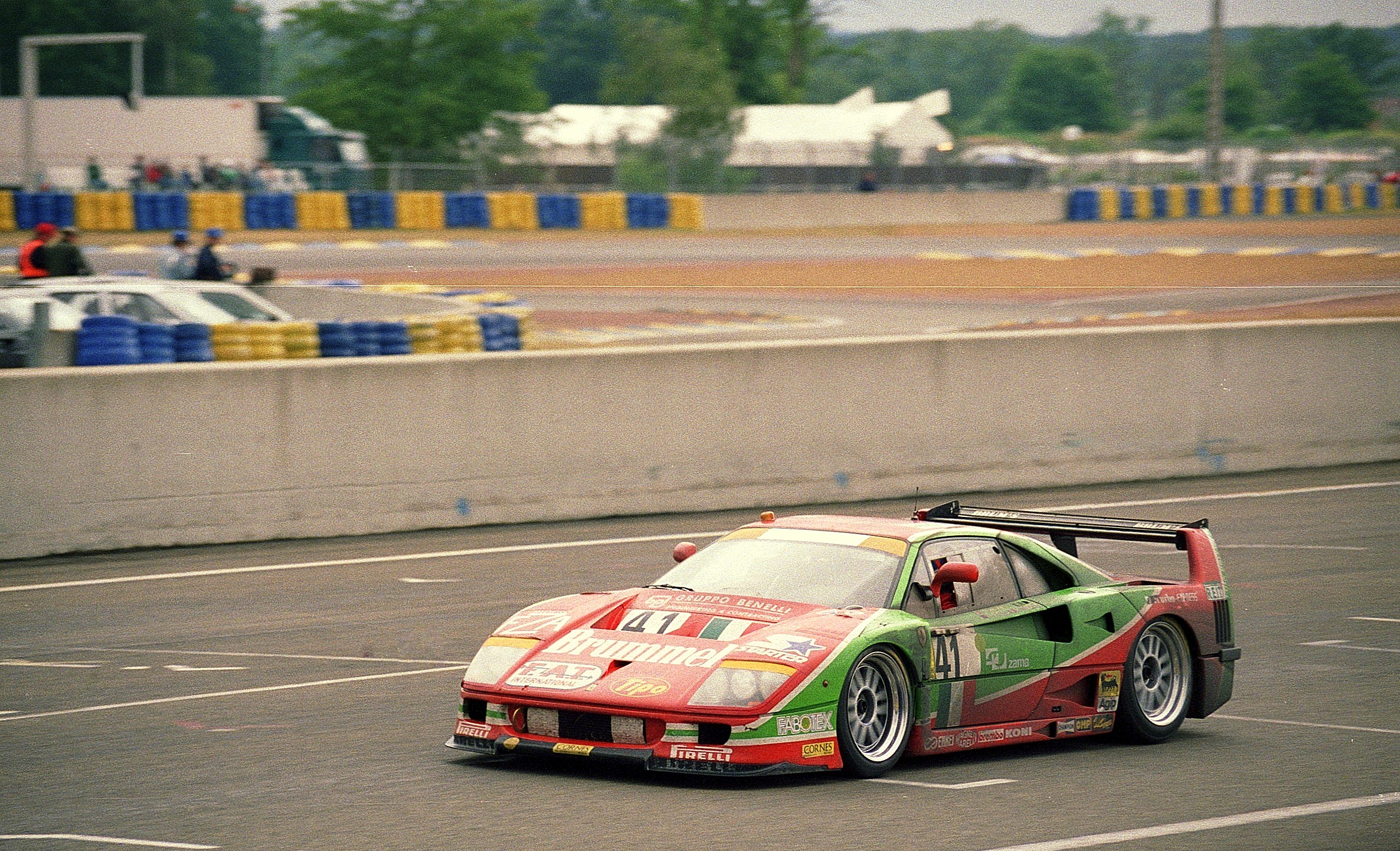
F40 GTE at the 1995 24 Hours of Le Mans

The F40 GTE (GT Evoluzione) is an upgraded version of the F40 LM, destined for the BPR Global GT Series. All seven examples of the car were converted by Michelotto. The F120B engine was enlarged twice – from 3.0 litres to 3.5 in 1995 and from 3.5 litres to 3.6 in 1996, producing 620 PS (456 kW; 612 bhp). In 1996, there were multiple aero improvements including a new rear wing, front splitter, rear diffuser, air intakes on the rear fender and air extractors on the front fenders.

It began its racing career in 1995 BPR Global GT Series season in the hands of Ferrari Club Italia and Jolly Club. At the 4 Hours of Monza, Ferrari Club Italia drivers, Anders Olofsson and Luciano Della Noce, secured a third place finish in its first race. Despite this strong start, the F40 GTE would suffer from reliability woes and retire from multiple races throughout the season. ENNEA Ferrari Club Italia entered a pair of F40 GTEs into the 1995 24 Hours of Le Mans in the GT1 class. The No. 41 entry, driven by Gary Ayles, Fabio Mancini and Massimo Monti, finished the race in 18th place, ninth in class. While the sister No. 40 car suffered a gearbox issue and retired after seven hours. At the 4 Hours of Silverstone, Olofsson and Della Noce claimed another third place finish.

The opening round of the 1996 BPR Global GT Series season at Paul Ricard saw both Ennea Igol entered F40 GTEs finish on the podium in second and third. Three cars were entered for the 1996 24 Hours of Le Mans all by Ennea SRL Igol, however none would make the finish. The first to retire was the No. 45 in the fifth hour with an electrical problem, the next was the No. 44 with an engine issue in the eighth hour, while the No. 59 car had a clutch failure in the thirteenth hour. At the 4 Hours of Anderstorp, Anders Olofsson and Luciano Della Noce took top honors for the first and only time in the F40 GTE.

== Performance ==
The first independent measurements yielded 0–100 km/h (0–62 mph) in 4.7 seconds and a top speed of 321 km/h (199 mph) onto the French Sport Auto September 1988 cover.

The next opportunity to reach the claimed top speed was a shootout at Nardò Ring organized by Auto, Motor und Sport. Ferrari sent two cars but neither could reach more than 321 km/h (199 mph), beaten by the Porsche 959 S, which attained a top speed of 339 km/h (211 mph), and the Ruf CTR, which attained a top speed of 342 km/h (213 mph). Both were limited production cars, with only twenty-nine 959 S and twenty-nine CTR built, so while the F40 never was the world's fastest sports car as self-appraised by Ferrari, it could still claim the title of the fastest production car with over five hundred units built until the arrival of the Lamborghini Diablo (depending on how the term "production car" is defined). Road & Track measured a top speed of 315 km/h (196 mph) for both the European and US spec cars while Car and Driver measured a top speed of 317 km/h (197 mph).

== Reception ==
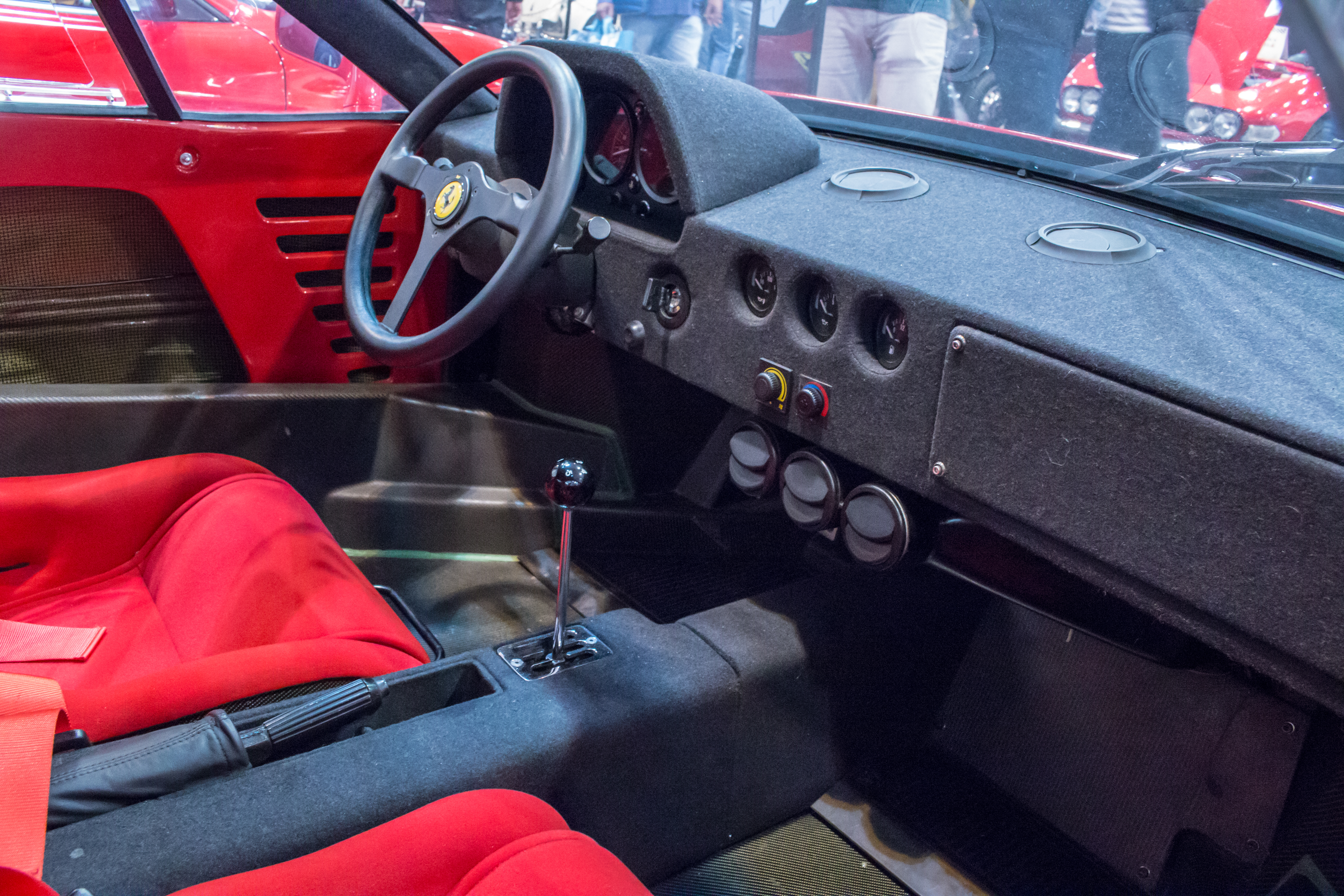
Interior

When the F40 was unveiled in 1987 it received mixed reactions. Dennis Simanaitis praised its looks in Road & Track, but others were unimpressed. Observers considered it a cynical attempt to cash in on speculators' money after seeing how much was paid for used 288 GTOs and for the Porsche 959. Speculators were expecting Enzo Ferrari's death and to benefit from rising prices. It was estimated in 1990 that only 10% of the delivered F40s were used for driving.

Speculators sold the cars with ever-rising prices, up to over seven times the list price in 1989 (before the bubble burst) which made it even more desirable.

Autocar tested an F40 in 1988 at the Fiorano test circuit. The writer, Mel Nichols, stated: "I do not yet know whether the F40 is untractable in traffic, fearsome in the wet, uncomfortably harsh on bumpy roads or too noisy on long journeys. It has no luggage space and getting in and out is awkward. But I do know this: on a smooth road it is a scintillatingly fast car that is docile and charming in its nature; a car that is demanding but not difficult to drive, blessed as it is with massive grip and, even more importantly, superb balance and manners. You can use its performance, the closest any production car maker has yet come to race car levels, and revel in it." In 1988, Ferrari invited journalists to test the F40 at their home track Fiorano Circuit and bring a Porsche 959 along for comparison. Automobile Magazine and Car both made the overall verdict that the Porsche 959 was the better car.

Gordon Murray analyzed the car in Motor Trend's July 1990 issue: "It's the lack of weight that makes the Ferrari so exciting. There's nothing else magic about the car at all...They're asking two- and three-inch-diameter steel tubes at chassis base datum level to do all the work, and it shows – you can feel the chassis flexing on the circuit and it wobbles all over the place on the road. It really does shake about. And, of course, once you excite the chassis the door panels start rattling and squeaking. Whereas the other cars feel taut and solid, this one's like a big go-kart with a plastic body on it." He severely criticized the old racing technology: "It's not even '60s technology, from a frame point of view, it's '50s twin-tube technology, not even a spaceframe. It's only got local frames to hold the bulkhead to the dash, attach the front suspension, rear suspension and roll bar. And then you have the marketing Kevlar glues in with a quarter-inch of rubber."

Car and Driver called the car a "mix of sheer terror and raw excitement". The most fun was accelerating in first gear from 15 mph (24 km/h), "pure terror" was driving on a busy highway. The rear vision was so bad that lane changes required "leaps of faith". It was found unfit for daily road use, "clunky and cantankerous" around town, "so mechanically delinquent that an onboard mechanic is advised"; to describe driver discomfort "Bangkok debtors' prison" was used. In a comparison test the Lamborghini Diablo was found better looking by the civilians while the testers opted for the F40. When Car and Driver declared the Porsche 911 Turbo the quickest A-to-B four-wheeled transport on American highways, the "nervous" Ferrari F40 wasn't found competitive because of being a 30-minute car: "After that, you'd like a cool drink and a brief nap."

== Legacy ==
Despite the mixed reviews on the car due to its spartan design and lack of the latest technology (when compared to the Porsche 959 and other supercars), the F40 remains a car that is liked by many individuals in the press and owners. Evo magazine's 2013 "Ferrari F40 buying guide" started with "For many it's the greatest road-going Ferrari of all". An expert explained its popularity among the Ferrari cognoscenti: "They will never be allowed to make another F40 in today's world of red tape and health and safety. That is what makes it so special and so desirable."

Richard Hammond compared the F40 to the Porsche 959 stating the F40 to be "as visceral and edgy an experience as the 959 is refined and sophisticated."

The value and the appeal of supercars are very subjective. Autocar named it the ultimate car to drive. Pistonheads stated that "There have been prettier, quicker, rarer Ferraris than the one built in its 40th year. But none as special". Motor Sport Magazine re-appraised it for the 21st century noting that its engine power delivery is docile at modest speeds and is unleashed when demanded by the driver. Classic And Sportscar concluded after a test with XJ220, EB110 and F40: "It's far from perfect. Actually, perfect isn't even on its radar but it's brutal, ballistic and a bit scary. Magic. No it really is that good." Autoexpress also noted that when the cars have the correct servicing of mechanical components and of the rubberised fuel tanks they are to this day robust and reliable thanks to their simplicity.
