= BPR Global GT Series =

Defunct auto racing championship

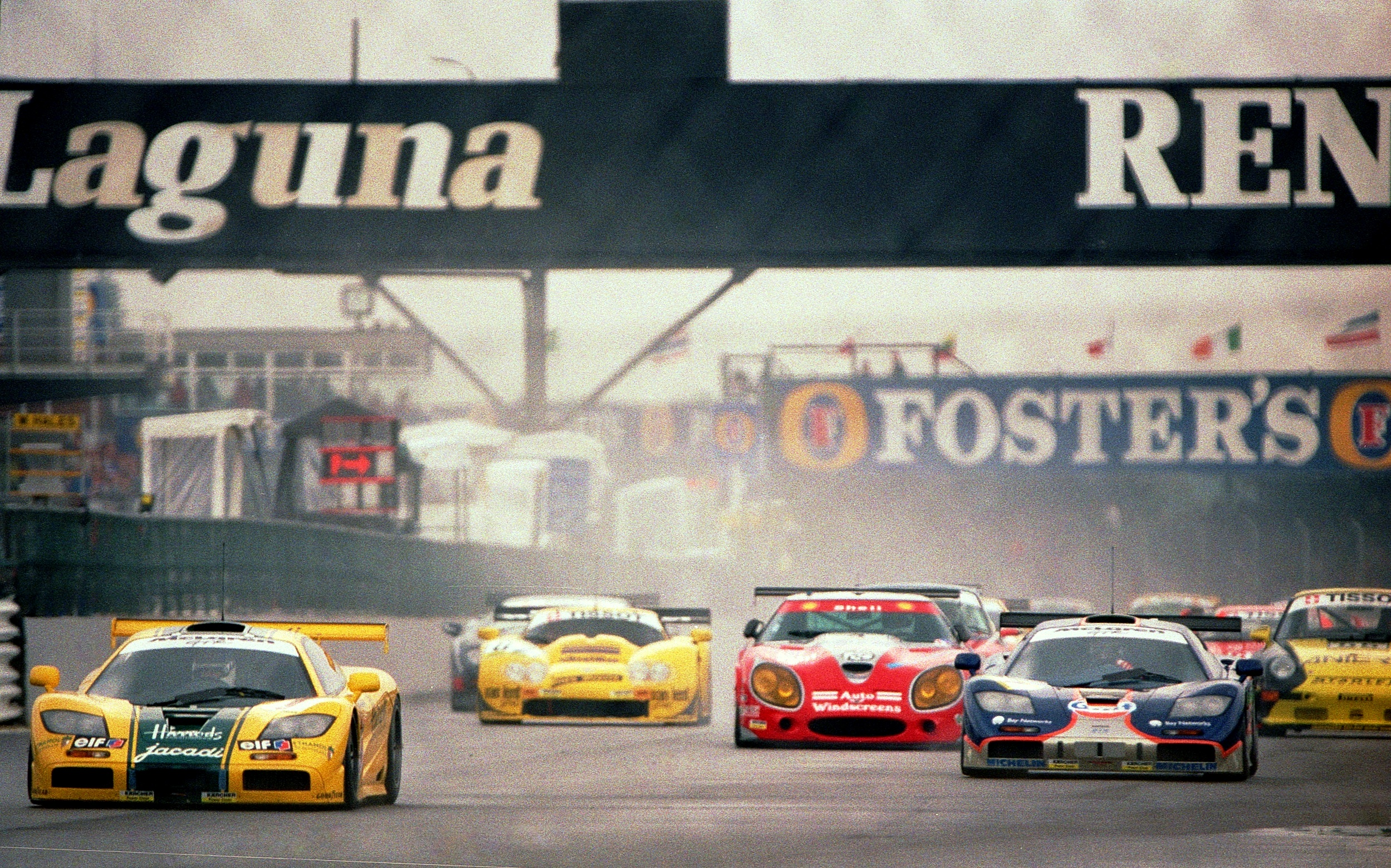
- The rainy start to the 1995 Silverstone 4 Hours race
- Category: Gran Turismo
- Country: International
- Inaugural season: 1994
- Folded: 1996
- Last Drivers' champion: (United Kingdom) Ray Bellm (United Kingdom) James Weaver
- Last Makes' champion: (United Kingdom) McLaren
- Last Teams' champion: (United Kingdom) GTC Competition

The BPR Global GT Series (sometimes referred to as the BPR Global GT Endurance Series or simply abbreviated as BPR) was a grand tourer-based sports car racing series which ran from 1994 to 1996 before becoming the FIA GT Championship in 1997.

The series was founded by Jürgen Barth, Patrick Peter, and Stéphane Ratel (their last names forming the BPR name) as an international endurance racing series to replace the World Sportscar Championship which had ended in 1992.

== History ==
Following the demise of the World Sportscar Championship in 1992, there were no international sports car racing series in existence, only small national series or manufacturer cup races featuring nearly identical cars. Patrick Peter and Stéphane Ratel of the Venturi series in France along with Jürgen Barth of the German Porsche series entered into discussions to combine their one-make series into an international championship that would bring back endurance racing to most of Europe as well as the rest of the world.

The series began in 1994 with an eight race schedule, including visits to Japan and China, with races of approximately four hours in length. Fields were initially made of a variety of Porsche and Venturi racing cars from various racing series broken into a wide variety of classes before later being joined by a modified Ferrari F40, Lotus Esprits, and Callaway Corvettes.

In 1995 the series would expand to twelve rounds and the amount of manufacturer interest was increased as new supercars such as the McLaren F1 GTR, Ferrari F40 GTE, and Jaguar XJ220 would appear, as well as lower class competitors like the Porsche 911 GT2 and De Tomaso Pantera. By 1996, manufacturer involvement had driven out most of the smaller cup cars, leading to the series slimming down to a mere two classes.

The manufacturer interest in the series reached a high point when Porsche launched their 911 GT1, a homologated supercar that was intended first as a racing car. Due to the amount manufacturer involvement, the Fédération Internationale de l'Automobile (FIA) decided that the series would be best managed by themselves, leading to the series being reformed into the FIA GT Championship, where it continued till 2009. Stéphane Ratel would remain in charge of the series commercial rights.

Although the BPR series was technically dead, some of its organizers would move onto other series. In France, Patrick Peter would create a new series in association with the French FFSA motorsport organization, known as the FFSA GT Championship. Cars would be less powerful than those seen in the other years of BPR, retaining the initial four class format, although this would be abandoned in later years.

Stéphane Ratel would create the SRO and help launch the GTR Euroseries in 1998 for privateer teams to avoid the large manufacturer involvement now seen in FIA GT. The GTR Euroseries would also retain the four-hour race format that was no longer used by FIA GT. Unfortunately this series would fail during its initial season. SRO would go on to create various other national GT series.

In 2006, the SRO announced the launch of the GT90's Revival Series, a historic racing series intended to see classic cars from the BPR series return to the track.

== Regulations ==
Unlike the World Sportscar Championship, which used custom built racing cars, the BPR series would use production sportscars which were modified into racing cars. Manufacturers would be required to have built a certain number of production cars for sale, with the number of homologation vehicles set by the class in which the car wished to participate. Initially four classes were used (GT1 through GT4) before being changed to two classes in 1996 (GT1 and GT2). The upper classes allowed deeper modifications from the production vehicles, including the use of exotic materials and non-production parts.

Teams were required to have two drivers per car, with each driver being required to drive a minimum amount in order to score points. Some teams could run three if they wished, although this was mostly used for amateur teams.

== Champions ==
Although multiple classes raced in the early years of BPR, only a single overall championship was rewarded.

	Driver Champion(s)	Team Champion
1994	No Championships Awarded	
1995	(Germany) Thomas Bscher (Denmark) John Nielsen	(United Kingdom) David Price Racing; McLaren F1 GTR
1996	(United Kingdom) Ray Bellm (United Kingdom) James Weaver	(United Kingdom) GTC Competition; McLaren F1 GTR

== See also ==
- FIA GT Championship
- World Sportscar Championship
- Scud Race/Sega Super GT – Arcade Game featuring BPR Global GT Series competitors.

== Bibliography ==
- Andrew Cotton & John Brooks (November 2017). 25 Years of GT Racing: Stéphane Ratel and SRO Motorsports. Evro Publishing. ISBN 978-1910505267.
- Weber, Robert (March 2020). Automobilsport Racing / History / Passion #23: BPR Global GT Series 1994-1996. Sportfahrer Verlag. ISSN 2199-126X.
