= Lindsay Owen-Jones =

Welsh businessman (born 1946)

Sir Lindsay Owen-Jones KBE
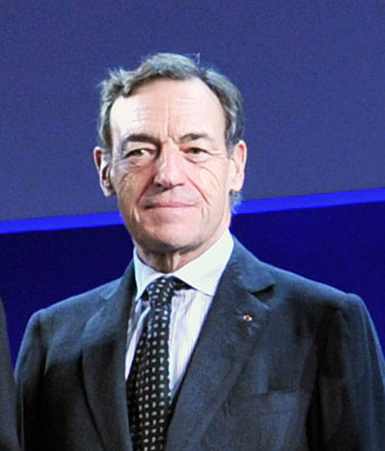
- Born: 17 March 1946 (age 80); Wallasey, Cheshire, England
- Education: University of Oxford; INSEAD
- Occupations: CEO & Chairman of L'Oréal (1988-2011)

Sir Lindsay Owen-Jones, KBE (born 17 March 1946), born in Wallasey, Cheshire (now Merseyside) to a Welsh family, was the chairman and CEO of the cosmetics and beauty company L'Oréal from 1988 to 2011.

In May 2019, he was ranked as the 292nd richest person in UK by The Sunday Times Rich List with a net worth of £467 million.

== Education ==
Owen-Jones went to Uppingham School in Rutland, before going on to study Modern Languages at Worcester College, Oxford, and Master of Business Administration at INSEAD. He has recently donated what the Provost termed a transformational £30 million to Worcester College.

== Career ==
He got his first job as a sales representative at L'Oréal in 1969, selling Dop shampoo in Normandy. In 1988, he was appointed Chairman and chief executive officer of L'Oréal, at age 42. Under his tenure, L'Oreál has widened its market; turning it from an almost entirely Europe-based organization to sell its products in countries around the world. Lindsay Owen-Jones resigned as Executive Chairman in 2011, but stays on as "Honorary President".

Owen-Jones is also a member of the board of directors at Ferrari SpA, BNP Paribas and Sanofi, and a member of the supervisory board of Air Liquide. A successful "gentleman" racing driver in sports and GT cars for many years, he is currently President of the FIA's Endurance Commission.

== Awards ==
Owen-Jones is a Commandeur of the Légion d'Honneur and a Knight Commander of the Order of the British Empire. In 2002, he was named "Best European Manager" by the Spanish Futuro magazine, and the U.S. magazine Business Week named him one of Europe's "Business Stars". Owen-Jones became the first foreign head of a French company to be awarded the "Manager of the Year 2002 Award" from French Prime Minister Jean-Pierre Raffarin.

In 2004, Owen-Jones was named one of the "25 Most Influential People in Fashion" by Time Magazine.

He was the only British head of a company listed on Paris's CAC 40.

In April 2005, Lindsay Owen-Jones was recognised for his significant contribution to France when he was decorated by the French Minister of Foreign Affairs as Commander of the Légion d’Honneur.

In 2005, he was awarded Knight Commander of the Order of the British Empire (KBE) in the Queen's Birthday Honours List.
