= 1995 BPR Global GT Series =

Car race series

Seasons
- ← 1994 1996 →

The 1995 BPR Kärcher Global Endurance GT was the second season of BPR Global GT Series. It was a series for Grand Touring style cars broken into four classes based on power and manufacturer involvement, using names from GT1 to GT4. It began on 26 February 1995 and ended 12 November 1995 after 12 races. This year Kärcher took the role of the primary sponsor of the Series.

== Schedule ==
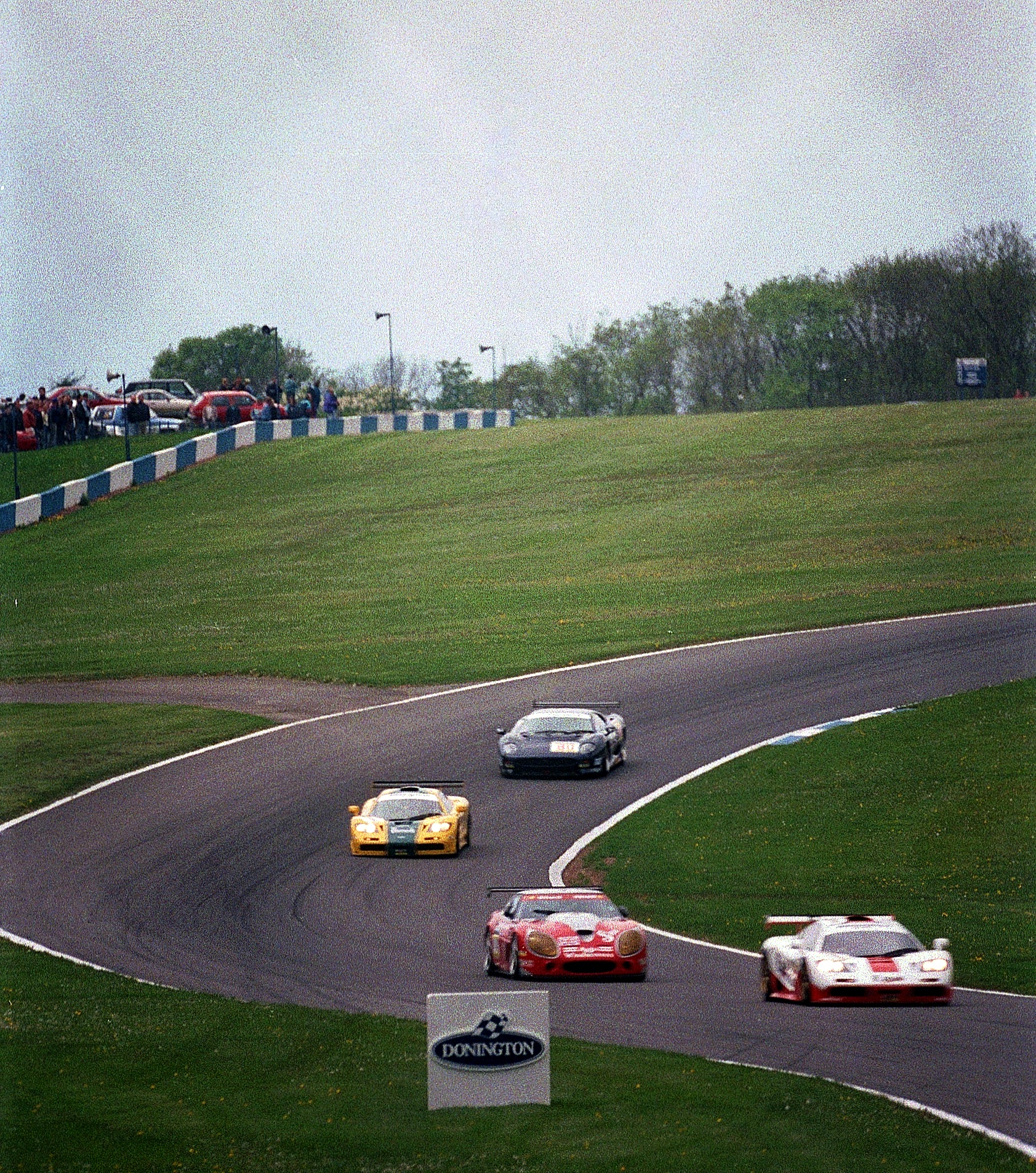
BPR cars competing at Donington, 1995

1995 BPR Kärcher Global Endurance GT Series Calendar
Rnd	Race	Circuit	Date
1	(Spain) 4 Hours of Jerez	Circuito Permanente de Jerez	26 February
2	(France) 4 Hours of Le Castellet	Circuit Paul Ricard	12 March
3	(Italy) 4 Hours of Monza	Autodromo Nazionale Monza	26 March
4	(Spain) 4 Hours of Jarama	Circuito Permanente Del Jarama	9 April
5	(Germany) 4 Hours of Nürburgring	Nürburgring	23 April
6	(United Kingdom) 4 Hours of Donington	Donington Park	8 May
7	(France) 1000 km de Paris	Autodrome de Montlhéry	14 May
8	(Sweden) 4 Hours of Anderstorp	Scandinavian Raceway	2 July
9	(Japan) 1000km of Suzuka	Suzuka Circuit	27 August
10	(United Kingdom) British Empire Trophy (4 Hours)	Silverstone Circuit	17 September
11	(France) 4 Hours of Nogaro	Circuit Paul Armagnac	8 October
12	(China) Shell Zhuhai International Race (3 Hours)	Zhuhai Street Circuit	12 November

== Entries ==
=== GT1 ===
Entrant	Car	Engine	Tyre	No.	Drivers	Rounds
Monaco Racing Team	Bugatti EB 110 SC	Bugatti B.110.11 3.5 L Quad-Turbo V12	M	01	(Monaco) Gildo Pallanca-Pastor	9
Monaco Racing Team	Bugatti EB 110 SC	Bugatti B.110.11 3.5 L Quad-Turbo V12	M	01	(France) Eric Hélary	9
(United Kingdom) Gulf Racing/GTC	McLaren F1 GTR	BMW S70/2 6.1 L V12	M	1	(United Kingdom) Ray Bellm	1–6, 8–12
(United Kingdom) Gulf Racing/GTC	McLaren F1 GTR	BMW S70/2 6.1 L V12	M	1	(Brazil) Maurizio Sandro Sala	1–6, 8–11
(United Kingdom) Gulf Racing/GTC	McLaren F1 GTR	BMW S70/2 6.1 L V12	M	1	(Japan) Masanori Sekiya	9
(United Kingdom) Gulf Racing/GTC	McLaren F1 GTR	BMW S70/2 6.1 L V12	M	1	(France) Bob Wollek	12
(United Kingdom) Gulf Racing/GTC	McLaren F1 GTR	BMW S70/2 6.1 L V12	M	3	(France) Pierre-Henri Raphanel	1–4
(United Kingdom) Gulf Racing/GTC	McLaren F1 GTR	BMW S70/2 6.1 L V12	M	3	(United Kingdom) Lindsay Owen-Jones	1–4
(United Kingdom) Gulf Racing/GTC	McLaren F1 GTR	BMW S70/2 6.1 L V12	M	16	(France) Pierre-Henri Raphanel	5–6, 8
(United Kingdom) Gulf Racing/GTC	McLaren F1 GTR	BMW S70/2 6.1 L V12	M	16	(United Kingdom) Lindsay Owen-Jones	5–6, 8
(United Kingdom) Gulf Racing/GTC	McLaren F1 GTR	BMW S70/2 6.1 L V12	M	16	(Japan) Hideo Fukuyama	9
(Japan) Sard Racing Team Co. Ltd.	SARD MC8-R	Toyota 1UZ-FE 4.0 L Turbo V8	D	3	(France) Alain Ferté	9
(Japan) Sard Racing Team Co. Ltd.	SARD MC8-R	Toyota 1UZ-FE 4.0 L Turbo V8	D	3	(Italy) Mauro Martini	9
(Japan) Sard Racing Team Co. Ltd.	SARD MC8-R	Toyota 1UZ-FE 4.0 L Turbo V8	D	3	(United States) Jeff Krosnoff	9
(France) BBA Compétition	McLaren F1 GTR; Venturi 600 LM	BMW S70/2 6.1 L V12; Renault PRV 3.0 L Turbo V6	D	5	(France) Jean-Luc Maury-Laribière	2–5, 7, 9, 12
(France) BBA Compétition	McLaren F1 GTR; Venturi 600 LM	BMW S70/2 6.1 L V12; Renault PRV 3.0 L Turbo V6	D	5	(Switzerland) Laurent Lécuyer	2–5, 7
(France) BBA Compétition	McLaren F1 GTR; Venturi 600 LM	BMW S70/2 6.1 L V12; Renault PRV 3.0 L Turbo V6	D	5	(France) Pascal Fabre	2–4
(France) BBA Compétition	McLaren F1 GTR; Venturi 600 LM	BMW S70/2 6.1 L V12; Renault PRV 3.0 L Turbo V6	D	5	(Netherlands) Hans Hugenholtz Jr.	5
(France) BBA Compétition	McLaren F1 GTR; Venturi 600 LM	BMW S70/2 6.1 L V12; Renault PRV 3.0 L Turbo V6	D	5	(France) Marc Sourd	7
(France) BBA Compétition	McLaren F1 GTR; Venturi 600 LM	BMW S70/2 6.1 L V12; Renault PRV 3.0 L Turbo V6	D	5	(Belgium) Jean-Paul Libert	9, 12
(France) BBA Compétition	McLaren F1 GTR; Venturi 600 LM	BMW S70/2 6.1 L V12; Renault PRV 3.0 L Turbo V6	D	5	(Japan) Jun Harada	9
(France) BBA Compétition	McLaren F1 GTR; Venturi 600 LM	BMW S70/2 6.1 L V12; Renault PRV 3.0 L Turbo V6	D	56	(France) Jean-Luc Maury-Laribière	1
(France) BBA Compétition	McLaren F1 GTR; Venturi 600 LM	BMW S70/2 6.1 L V12; Renault PRV 3.0 L Turbo V6	D	56	(Switzerland) Laurent Lécuyer	1
(France) BBA Compétition	McLaren F1 GTR; Venturi 600 LM	BMW S70/2 6.1 L V12; Renault PRV 3.0 L Turbo V6	D	56	(France) Pascal Fabre	1
(France) GRT Jacadi	McLaren F1 GTR	BMW S70/2 6.1 L V12	M	7	(France) Fabien Giroix	4–6, 9, 12
(France) GRT Jacadi	McLaren F1 GTR	BMW S70/2 6.1 L V12	M	7	(France) Olivier Grouillard	4–6
(France) GRT Jacadi	McLaren F1 GTR	BMW S70/2 6.1 L V12	M	7	(Switzerland) Jean-Denis Délétraz	9, 12
(United Kingdom) West Competition	McLaren F1 GTR	BMW S70/2 6.1 L V12	G	8	(Denmark) John Nielsen	1–6, 8–12
(United Kingdom) West Competition	McLaren F1 GTR	BMW S70/2 6.1 L V12	G	8	(Germany) Thomas Bscher	1–6, 8–12
(United Kingdom) Mach One Racing	McLaren F1 GTR	BMW S70/2 6.1 L V12	G	9	(United Kingdom) Andy Wallace	4–6, 9–12
(United Kingdom) Mach One Racing	McLaren F1 GTR	BMW S70/2 6.1 L V12	G	9	(United Kingdom) Justin Bell	4–6
(United Kingdom) Mach One Racing	McLaren F1 GTR	BMW S70/2 6.1 L V12	G	9	(Austria) Karl Wendlinger	9
(United Kingdom) Mach One Racing	McLaren F1 GTR	BMW S70/2 6.1 L V12	G	9	(France) Olivier Grouillard	10–12
(Germany) Kremer Racing	Porsche 911 GT2	Porsche 3.6 L Turbo Flat-6	G	10	(Spain) Tomás Saldaña	1, 3–5, 10
(Germany) Kremer Racing	Porsche 911 GT2	Porsche 3.6 L Turbo Flat-6	G	10	(Spain) Alfonso de Orléans-Borbón	1, 3–5, 10
(Germany) Scuderia Offenbach	Porsche 911 RSR 3.6	Porsche 3.6 L Flat-6		13	(Germany) Harald Weiland	5
(Germany) Scuderia Offenbach	Porsche 911 RSR 3.6	Porsche 3.6 L Flat-6		13	(Germany) Mathias Weiland	5
(United Kingdom) PC Automotive Jaguar	Jaguar XJ220	Jaguar JV6 3.5 L Turbo V6	D	17	(United Kingdom) Richard Piper	3, 5–6
(United Kingdom) PC Automotive Jaguar	Jaguar XJ220	Jaguar JV6 3.5 L Turbo V6	D	17	(United States) Olindo Iacobelli	3
(United Kingdom) PC Automotive Jaguar	Jaguar XJ220	Jaguar JV6 3.5 L Turbo V6	D	17	(United Kingdom) Win Percy	5
(United Kingdom) PC Automotive Jaguar	Jaguar XJ220	Jaguar JV6 3.5 L Turbo V6	D	17	(United Kingdom) Tiff Needell	6
(Germany) Konrad Motorsport	Porsche 911 Bi-Turbo	Porsche 3.6 L Turbo Flat-6	P	21	(Austria) Franz Konrad	1–2
(Germany) Konrad Motorsport	Porsche 911 Bi-Turbo	Porsche 3.6 L Turbo Flat-6	P	21	(France) Ferdinand de Lesseps	1
(Germany) Konrad Motorsport	Porsche 911 Bi-Turbo	Porsche 3.6 L Turbo Flat-6	P	21	(Netherlands) Bert Ploeg	2
(Germany) Konrad Motorsport	Porsche 911 Bi-Turbo	Porsche 3.6 L Turbo Flat-6	P	42	(Germany) Bernd Netzeband	5
(Germany) Konrad Motorsport	Porsche 911 Bi-Turbo	Porsche 3.6 L Turbo Flat-6	P	42	(Germany) Peter Schem	5
(Germany) Konrad Motorsport	Porsche 911 Bi-Turbo	Porsche 3.6 L Turbo Flat-6	P	42	(Sweden) Koit Veertee	8
(Germany) Konrad Motorsport	Porsche 911 Bi-Turbo	Porsche 3.6 L Turbo Flat-6	P	42	(Sweden) Örnulf Wirdheim	8
(Germany) Konrad Motorsport	Porsche 911 Bi-Turbo	Porsche 3.6 L Turbo Flat-6	P	42	(Germany) Karsten Dinkloh	9
(Germany) Konrad Motorsport	Porsche 911 Bi-Turbo	Porsche 3.6 L Turbo Flat-6	P	42	(Austria) Niki Siokola	9
(Germany) Konrad Motorsport	Porsche 911 Bi-Turbo	Porsche 3.6 L Turbo Flat-6	P	42	(Germany) Ernst Schuster	12
(Germany) Konrad Motorsport	Porsche 911 Bi-Turbo	Porsche 3.6 L Turbo Flat-6	P	42	(Austria) Frank Schmickler	12
(Germany) HO Motorsport	Porsche 911 Bi-Turbo	Porsche 3.6 L Turbo Flat-6	P	25	(Switzerland) Sandro Angelastri	2–3, 5
(Germany) HO Motorsport	Porsche 911 Bi-Turbo	Porsche 3.6 L Turbo Flat-6	P	25	(Germany) Harald Grohs	2
(Germany) HO Motorsport	Porsche 911 Bi-Turbo	Porsche 3.6 L Turbo Flat-6	P	25	(Germany) Jürgen von Gartzen	3–5
(Germany) HO Motorsport	Porsche 911 Bi-Turbo	Porsche 3.6 L Turbo Flat-6	P	25	(Germany) Jürgen Lässig	4
(France) Crisal Competition	Venturi 600LM; Venturi 400GTR	Renault PRV 3.0 L Turbo V6	D	26	(France) Thiérry Guiod	2, 4, 7
(France) Crisal Competition	Venturi 600LM; Venturi 400GTR	Renault PRV 3.0 L Turbo V6	D	26	(France) Gérard Bacle	2, 4, 7
(France) Crisal Competition	Venturi 600LM; Venturi 400GTR	Renault PRV 3.0 L Turbo V6	D	26	(France) Michel Cottot	4, 7
(France) Crisal Competition	Venturi 600LM; Venturi 400GTR	Renault PRV 3.0 L Turbo V6	D	29	(France) Michel Cottot	9, 12
(France) Crisal Competition	Venturi 600LM; Venturi 400GTR	Renault PRV 3.0 L Turbo V6	D	29	(France) Philippe Smaniotto	9, 12
(Germany) Obermaier Racing	Porsche 911 Bi-Turbo	Porsche 3.6 L Turbo Flat-6	G	30	(Germany) Friedrich Leinemann	1–5, 7
(Germany) Obermaier Racing	Porsche 911 Bi-Turbo	Porsche 3.6 L Turbo Flat-6	G	30	(Germany) Otto Altenbach	1, 4–5, 7
(Germany) Obermaier Racing	Porsche 911 Bi-Turbo	Porsche 3.6 L Turbo Flat-6	G	30	(Sweden) Örnulf Wirdheim	2, 10
(Germany) Obermaier Racing	Porsche 911 Bi-Turbo	Porsche 3.6 L Turbo Flat-6	G	30	(Switzerland) Charles Margueron	3
(Germany) Obermaier Racing	Porsche 911 Bi-Turbo	Porsche 3.6 L Turbo Flat-6	G	30	(Sweden) Koit Veertee	10
(Japan) Toyota Team Tom's	Toyota Supra GT-LM	Toyota 3S-GTE 2.1 L Turbo I4	M	36	(Finland) JJ Lehto	12
(Japan) Toyota Team Tom's	Toyota Supra GT-LM	Toyota 3S-GTE 2.1 L Turbo I4	M	36	(France) Yannick Dalmas	12
(Japan) Toyota Team Tom's	Toyota Supra GT-LM	Toyota 3S-GTE 2.1 L Turbo I4	M	37	(France) Philippe Alliot	12
(Japan) Toyota Team Tom's	Toyota Supra GT-LM	Toyota 3S-GTE 2.1 L Turbo I4	M	37	(France) Pierre-Henri Raphanel	12
(United Kingdom) ADA Engineering	De Tomaso Pantera	Ford 5.0 L V8	G	37	(Denmark) Thorkild Thyrring	1–3
(United Kingdom) ADA Engineering	De Tomaso Pantera	Ford 5.0 L V8	G	37	(United Kingdom) Andy Wallace	1–3
(France) Pilot Aldix Racing	Ferrari F40 LM; Ferrari F40 GT	Ferrari F120B 3.0 L Turbo V8	M	40	(Belgium) Michel Neugarten	1, 12
(France) Pilot Aldix Racing	Ferrari F40 LM; Ferrari F40 GT	Ferrari F120B 3.0 L Turbo V8	M	40	(France) Paul Belmondo	1
(France) Pilot Aldix Racing	Ferrari F40 LM; Ferrari F40 GT	Ferrari F120B 3.0 L Turbo V8	M	40	(Spain) Santiago Puig	1
(France) Pilot Aldix Racing	Ferrari F40 LM; Ferrari F40 GT	Ferrari F120B 3.0 L Turbo V8	M	40	(France) Olivier Thévenin	2–5, 7–12
(France) Pilot Aldix Racing	Ferrari F40 LM; Ferrari F40 GT	Ferrari F120B 3.0 L Turbo V8	M	40	(France) Michel Ferté	2–5, 7–11
(France) Pilot Aldix Racing	Ferrari F40 LM; Ferrari F40 GT	Ferrari F120B 3.0 L Turbo V8	M	40	(France) Alain Ferté	4
(France) Pilot Aldix Racing	Ferrari F40 LM; Ferrari F40 GT	Ferrari F120B 3.0 L Turbo V8	M	40	(Italy) Paolo Mondini	11
(France) Pilot Aldix Racing	Ferrari F40 LM; Ferrari F40 GT	Ferrari F120B 3.0 L Turbo V8	M	41	(France) Paul Belmondo	2–4, 7, 10–11
(France) Pilot Aldix Racing	Ferrari F40 LM; Ferrari F40 GT	Ferrari F120B 3.0 L Turbo V8	M	41	(Spain) Santiago Puig	2–4, 7–8, 10–11
(France) Pilot Aldix Racing	Ferrari F40 LM; Ferrari F40 GT	Ferrari F120B 3.0 L Turbo V8	M	41	(Belgium) Michel Neugarten	2, 8
(France) Pilot Aldix Racing	Ferrari F40 LM; Ferrari F40 GT	Ferrari F120B 3.0 L Turbo V8	M	41	(France) Ferdinand de Lesseps	3
(France) Pilot Aldix Racing	Ferrari F40 LM; Ferrari F40 GT	Ferrari F120B 3.0 L Turbo V8	M	41	(Spain) Fernando Moller	4, 8, 10
(France) Pilot Aldix Racing	Ferrari F40 LM; Ferrari F40 GT	Ferrari F120B 3.0 L Turbo V8	M	41	(France) François Chatriot	7, 11
(France) JCB Racing	Venturi 600LM	Renault PRV 3.0 L Turbo V6	D	43	(France) Jean-Claude Basso	2, 4, 7, 11
(France) JCB Racing	Venturi 600LM	Renault PRV 3.0 L Turbo V6	D	43	(France) Henri Pescarolo	2, 4, 7, 11
(France) Promo Racing Car	Venturi 600LM	Renault PRV 3.0 L Turbo V6	D	44	(France) Éric Graham	1–2, 4, 7–9, 12
(France) Promo Racing Car	Venturi 600LM	Renault PRV 3.0 L Turbo V6	D	44	(France) François Birbeau	1–2, 4, 7–9, 12
(France) Promo Racing Car	Venturi 600LM	Renault PRV 3.0 L Turbo V6	D	44	(France) Michel Faraut	1–2, 4, 7–9, 12
(France) Larbre Compétition	Porsche 911 GT2 Evo	Porsche 3.6 L Turbo Flat-6	M	47	(Monaco) Stéphane Ortelli	9, 12
(France) Larbre Compétition	Porsche 911 GT2 Evo	Porsche 3.6 L Turbo Flat-6	M	47	(France) Dominique Dupuy	9
(France) Larbre Compétition	Porsche 911 GT2 Evo	Porsche 3.6 L Turbo Flat-6	M	47	(Germany) Jürgen Barth	9
(France) Larbre Compétition	Porsche 911 GT2 Evo	Porsche 3.6 L Turbo Flat-6	M	47	(France) Jean-Luc Chéreau	11
(France) Larbre Compétition	Porsche 911 GT2 Evo	Porsche 3.6 L Turbo Flat-6	M	47	(France) Pierre Yver	11
(France) Larbre Compétition	Porsche 911 GT2 Evo	Porsche 3.6 L Turbo Flat-6	M	47	(France) Eric Hélary	11
(France) Larbre Compétition	Porsche 911 GT2 Evo	Porsche 3.6 L Turbo Flat-6	M	47	(France) Henri Pescarolo	12
(France) Larbre Compétition	Porsche 911 GT2 Evo	Porsche 3.6 L Turbo Flat-6	M	47	(France) Jack Leconte	12
(France) Larbre Compétition	Porsche 911 GT2 Evo	Porsche 3.6 L Turbo Flat-6	M	86	(France) Jean-Pierre Jarier	1–6, 9, 11–12
(France) Larbre Compétition	Porsche 911 GT2 Evo	Porsche 3.6 L Turbo Flat-6	M	86	(France) Bob Wollek	1–6, 9, 11
(France) Larbre Compétition	Porsche 911 GT2 Evo	Porsche 3.6 L Turbo Flat-6	M	86	(France) Christophe Bouchut	1–6, 11–12
(Germany) Freisinger Motorsport	Porsche 911 Bi-Turbo; Porsche 911 GT2	Porsche 3.6 L Turbo Flat-6	G	49	(France) Jean-Pierre Castel	2
(Germany) Freisinger Motorsport	Porsche 911 Bi-Turbo; Porsche 911 GT2	Porsche 3.6 L Turbo Flat-6	G	49	(France) Michel Krine	2
(Germany) Freisinger Motorsport	Porsche 911 Bi-Turbo; Porsche 911 GT2	Porsche 3.6 L Turbo Flat-6	G	49	(France) Henri Pescarolo	3
(Germany) Freisinger Motorsport	Porsche 911 Bi-Turbo; Porsche 911 GT2	Porsche 3.6 L Turbo Flat-6	G	49	(Italy) Bruno Giacomelli	3
(Germany) Freisinger Motorsport	Porsche 911 Bi-Turbo; Porsche 911 GT2	Porsche 3.6 L Turbo Flat-6	G	50	(Germany) Wolfgang Kaufmann	1–9, 12
(Germany) Freisinger Motorsport	Porsche 911 Bi-Turbo; Porsche 911 GT2	Porsche 3.6 L Turbo Flat-6	G	50	(France) Michel Ligonnet	1–2, 6, 9, 12
(Germany) Freisinger Motorsport	Porsche 911 Bi-Turbo; Porsche 911 GT2	Porsche 3.6 L Turbo Flat-6	G	50	(France) Philippe Albera	2, 6
(Germany) Freisinger Motorsport	Porsche 911 Bi-Turbo; Porsche 911 GT2	Porsche 3.6 L Turbo Flat-6	G	50	(United Kingdom) Rupert Keegan	3
(Germany) Freisinger Motorsport	Porsche 911 Bi-Turbo; Porsche 911 GT2	Porsche 3.6 L Turbo Flat-6	G	50	(Italy) Pietro Ferrero Jr.	3
(Germany) Freisinger Motorsport	Porsche 911 Bi-Turbo; Porsche 911 GT2	Porsche 3.6 L Turbo Flat-6	G	50	(Italy) Bruno Giacomelli	4–5
(Germany) Freisinger Motorsport	Porsche 911 Bi-Turbo; Porsche 911 GT2	Porsche 3.6 L Turbo Flat-6	G	50	(Italy) Fulvio Ballabio	4
(Germany) Freisinger Motorsport	Porsche 911 Bi-Turbo; Porsche 911 GT2	Porsche 3.6 L Turbo Flat-6	G	50	(France) Bob Wollek	7
(Germany) Freisinger Motorsport	Porsche 911 Bi-Turbo; Porsche 911 GT2	Porsche 3.6 L Turbo Flat-6	G	50	(France) Richard Balandras	7
(Germany) Freisinger Motorsport	Porsche 911 Bi-Turbo; Porsche 911 GT2	Porsche 3.6 L Turbo Flat-6	G	50	(Germany) Peter Oberndorfer	8
(Germany) Freisinger Motorsport	Porsche 911 Bi-Turbo; Porsche 911 GT2	Porsche 3.6 L Turbo Flat-6	G	50	(Sweden) Steven Andskär	8
(Germany) Freisinger Motorsport	Porsche 911 Bi-Turbo; Porsche 911 GT2	Porsche 3.6 L Turbo Flat-6	G	50	(Japan) Yukihiro Hane	9
(Germany) Freisinger Motorsport	Porsche 911 Bi-Turbo; Porsche 911 GT2	Porsche 3.6 L Turbo Flat-6	G	51	(France) Philippe Albera	3–4
(Germany) Freisinger Motorsport	Porsche 911 Bi-Turbo; Porsche 911 GT2	Porsche 3.6 L Turbo Flat-6	G	51	(France) Michel Ligonnet	3
(Germany) Freisinger Motorsport	Porsche 911 Bi-Turbo; Porsche 911 GT2	Porsche 3.6 L Turbo Flat-6	G	51	(France) Michel Krine	4, 7
(Germany) Freisinger Motorsport	Porsche 911 Bi-Turbo; Porsche 911 GT2	Porsche 3.6 L Turbo Flat-6	G	51	(Spain) Jesús Diez de Villarroel	4
(Germany) Freisinger Motorsport	Porsche 911 Bi-Turbo; Porsche 911 GT2	Porsche 3.6 L Turbo Flat-6	G	51	(France) Daniel Sebag	7
(Germany) Freisinger Motorsport	Porsche 911 Bi-Turbo; Porsche 911 GT2	Porsche 3.6 L Turbo Flat-6	G	51	(France) Michel Quiniou	9
(Germany) Freisinger Motorsport	Porsche 911 Bi-Turbo; Porsche 911 GT2	Porsche 3.6 L Turbo Flat-6	G	51	(France) Richard Flammang	9
(Germany) Freisinger Motorsport	Porsche 911 Bi-Turbo; Porsche 911 GT2	Porsche 3.6 L Turbo Flat-6	G	51	(Japan) Masahiro Kimato	9
(Germany) Freisinger Motorsport	Porsche 911 Bi-Turbo; Porsche 911 GT2	Porsche 3.6 L Turbo Flat-6	G	51	(France) Emmanuel Clérico	12
(Germany) Freisinger Motorsport	Porsche 911 Bi-Turbo; Porsche 911 GT2	Porsche 3.6 L Turbo Flat-6	G	51	(Japan) Yukihiro Hane	12
(Italy) Ferrari Club Italia	Ferrari F40 GTE	Ferrari F120B 3.5 L Turbo V8	P	60	(Sweden) Anders Olofsson	3–5, 7–12
(Italy) Ferrari Club Italia	Ferrari F40 GTE	Ferrari F120B 3.5 L Turbo V8	P	60	(Italy) Luciano Della Noce	3–5, 7–12
(Italy) Ferrari Club Italia	Ferrari F40 GTE	Ferrari F120B 3.5 L Turbo V8	P	60	(Italy) Fabio Mancini	9
(Italy) Ferrari Club Italia	Ferrari F40 GTE	Ferrari F120B 3.5 L Turbo V8	P	61	(United Kingdom) Gary Ayles	4–5, 7–12
(Italy) Ferrari Club Italia	Ferrari F40 GTE	Ferrari F120B 3.5 L Turbo V8	P	61	(Italy) Massimo Monti	4–5, 7–10
(Italy) Ferrari Club Italia	Ferrari F40 GTE	Ferrari F120B 3.5 L Turbo V8	P	61	(Italy) Fabio Mancini	4–5, 7–8, 10
(Italy) Ferrari Club Italia	Ferrari F40 GTE	Ferrari F120B 3.5 L Turbo V8	P	61	(Japan) Tetsuya Oota	9
(Italy) Ferrari Club Italia	Ferrari F40 GTE	Ferrari F120B 3.5 L Turbo V8	P	61	(Italy) Luca Drudi	11–12
(Italy) Ferrari Club Italia	Ferrari F40 GTE	Ferrari F120B 3.5 L Turbo V8	P	61	(France) Jean-Marc Gounon	12
(France) Cobras Organisation	Porsche 911 Bi-Turbo	Porsche 3.6 L Turbo Flat-6		62	(France) Guy Broissiat	11
(France) Cobras Organisation	Porsche 911 Bi-Turbo	Porsche 3.6 L Turbo Flat-6		62	(France) Michel Mora	11
(France) RSG Reflex	Venturi 600LM	Renault PRV 3.0 L Turbo V6		71	(France) Jean-Bernard Bouvet	7
(France) RSG Reflex	Venturi 600LM	Renault PRV 3.0 L Turbo V6		71	(Belgium) Jean-Paul Libert	7
(United Kingdom) Chamberlain Engineering (United Kingdom) Lesac Jaguar	Jaguar XJ220	Jaguar JV6 3.5 L Turbo V6	Y G	80	(United Kingdom) Peter Hardman	6–8, 10, 12
(United Kingdom) Chamberlain Engineering (United Kingdom) Lesac Jaguar	Jaguar XJ220	Jaguar JV6 3.5 L Turbo V6	Y G	80	(United Kingdom) Richard Dean	6, 8
(United Kingdom) Chamberlain Engineering (United Kingdom) Lesac Jaguar	Jaguar XJ220	Jaguar JV6 3.5 L Turbo V6	Y G	80	(Germany) Andreas Fuchs	7
(United Kingdom) Chamberlain Engineering (United Kingdom) Lesac Jaguar	Jaguar XJ220	Jaguar JV6 3.5 L Turbo V6	Y G	80	(United Kingdom) Nick Adams	10
(United Kingdom) Chamberlain Engineering (United Kingdom) Lesac Jaguar	Jaguar XJ220	Jaguar JV6 3.5 L Turbo V6	Y G	80	(South Africa) Stephen Watson	12
(France) Société Venturi SA	Venturi 600SLM	Renault PRV 3.0 L Turbo V6	M	90	(France) Philippe Gache	9, 12
(France) Société Venturi SA	Venturi 600SLM	Renault PRV 3.0 L Turbo V6	M	90	(France) Arnaud Trévisiol	9, 12
(France) Société Venturi SA	Venturi 600SLM	Renault PRV 3.0 L Turbo V6	M	90	(France) Jean-Marc Gounon	9

=== GT2 ===
Entrant	Car	Engine	Tyre	No.	Drivers	Rounds
(France) Crisal Competition	Porsche 911 Carrera 2 Cup	Porsche 3.6 L Flat-6	D	27	(France) Jean-Claude Barthe	7
(France) Crisal Competition	Porsche 911 Carrera 2 Cup	Porsche 3.6 L Flat-6	D	27	(France) Franck Goguel	7
(France) Crisal Competition	Porsche 911 Carrera 2 Cup	Porsche 3.6 L Flat-6	D	27	(France) Maurice Pelissier	7
(France) Crisal Competition	Ferrari F355	Ferrari F129B 3.5 L V8	D	28	(France) Patrick Boidron	2
(France) Crisal Competition	Ferrari F355	Ferrari F129B 3.5 L V8	D	28	(France) Eric Ralli	2
(France) Crisal Competition	Ferrari F355	Ferrari F129B 3.5 L V8	D	28	(France) Patrick Camus	2
(France) Crisal Competition	Porsche 911 Carrera RS; Venturi 400GTR	Porsche 3.8 L Flat-6; Renault PRV 3.0 L Turbo V6	D	29	(France) Jérôme Brarda	2, 4
(France) Crisal Competition	Porsche 911 Carrera RS; Venturi 400GTR	Porsche 3.8 L Flat-6; Renault PRV 3.0 L Turbo V6	D	29	(France) Patrick Guillot	2
(France) Crisal Competition	Porsche 911 Carrera RS; Venturi 400GTR	Porsche 3.8 L Flat-6; Renault PRV 3.0 L Turbo V6	D	29	(Switzerland) Pierre Müller	2
(France) Crisal Competition	Porsche 911 Carrera RS; Venturi 400GTR	Porsche 3.8 L Flat-6; Renault PRV 3.0 L Turbo V6	D	29	(France) Jean-Claude Barthe	4, 10
(France) Crisal Competition	Porsche 911 Carrera RS; Venturi 400GTR	Porsche 3.8 L Flat-6; Renault PRV 3.0 L Turbo V6	D	29	(France) Thiérry Guiod	5, 10
(France) Crisal Competition	Porsche 911 Carrera RS; Venturi 400GTR	Porsche 3.8 L Flat-6; Renault PRV 3.0 L Turbo V6	D	29	(France) Philippe Smaniotto	5
(France) Crisal Competition	Porsche 911 Carrera RS; Venturi 400GTR	Porsche 3.8 L Flat-6; Renault PRV 3.0 L Turbo V6	D	29	(France) Franck Goguel	10
(France) Raymond Touroul	Porsche 911 Carrera RSR	Porsche 3.8 L Flat-6	M	57	(France) Raymond Touroul	7, 10
(France) Raymond Touroul	Porsche 911 Carrera RSR	Porsche 3.8 L Flat-6	M	57	(France) Thierry Perrier	7
(France) Raymond Touroul	Porsche 911 Carrera RSR	Porsche 3.8 L Flat-6	M	57	(France) Jean-Pierre Tardiff	7
(France) Raymond Touroul	Porsche 911 Carrera RSR	Porsche 3.8 L Flat-6	M	57	(France) Didier Ortion	10
(France) Raymond Touroul	Porsche 911 Carrera RSR	Porsche 3.8 L Flat-6	M	57	(France) François Jakubowski	10
(France) Cobras Organisation	Porsche 911 Turbo	Porsche 3.6 L Turbo Flat-6		62	(France) Guy Broissiat	2–3
(France) Cobras Organisation	Porsche 911 Turbo	Porsche 3.6 L Turbo Flat-6		62	(France) Michel Mora	2–3
(United Kingdom) Morgan Motor Company	Morgan Plus 8 GTR	Rover 5.0 L V8	D	63	(United Kingdom) Charles Morgan	9
(United Kingdom) Morgan Motor Company	Morgan Plus 8 GTR	Rover 5.0 L V8	D	63	(United Kingdom) William Wykeham	9
(Italy) Promosport 92 Ltd.	Porsche 911 Turbo S	Porsche 3.6 L Turbo Flat-6	P	66	(Italy) Renato Mastropietro	4
(Italy) Promosport 92 Ltd.	Porsche 911 Turbo S	Porsche 3.6 L Turbo Flat-6	P	66	(Italy) Angelo Zadra	4

=== GT3 ===
Entrant	Car	Engine	Tyre	No.	Drivers	Rounds
(United Kingdom) Agusta Racing Team	Callaway Corvette LM600	Chevrolet 6.2 L V8	D	2	(Italy) Almo Coppelli	2–3, 6, 8, 10
(United Kingdom) Agusta Racing Team	Callaway Corvette LM600	Chevrolet 6.2 L V8	D	2	(Belgium) Philippe Olczyk	2–3, 6
(United Kingdom) Agusta Racing Team	Callaway Corvette LM600	Chevrolet 6.2 L V8	D	2	(United Kingdom) Martin Stretton	6
(United Kingdom) Agusta Racing Team	Callaway Corvette LM600	Chevrolet 6.2 L V8	D	2	(Sweden) Carl Rosenblad	8, 10
(United Kingdom) Agusta Racing Team	Callaway Corvette LM600	Chevrolet 6.2 L V8	D	4	(Italy) Rocky Agusta	2, 6
(United Kingdom) Agusta Racing Team	Callaway Corvette LM600	Chevrolet 6.2 L V8	D	4	(United Kingdom) Eugene O'Brien	2–3, 6, 10
(United Kingdom) Agusta Racing Team	Callaway Corvette LM600	Chevrolet 6.2 L V8	D	4	(Italy) Giovanna Amati	2–3
(United Kingdom) Agusta Racing Team	Callaway Corvette LM600	Chevrolet 6.2 L V8	D	4	(Germany) Seppi Wendlinger	3, 5, 10
(United Kingdom) Agusta Racing Team	Callaway Corvette LM600	Chevrolet 6.2 L V8	D	4	(United Kingdom) Robin Donovan	5–6
(United Kingdom) Agusta Racing Team	Callaway Corvette LM600	Chevrolet 6.2 L V8	D	4	(Italy) Almo Coppelli	5
(United Kingdom) Agusta Racing Team	Callaway Corvette LM600	Chevrolet 6.2 L V8	D	4	(United Kingdom) Jeffrey Pattinson	10
(France) Quattro Racing	Porsche 911 Carrera 4 Cup	Porsche 3.8 L Flat-6		3	(France) Jean-Claude Fabre	6–7, 11
(France) Quattro Racing	Porsche 911 Carrera 4 Cup	Porsche 3.8 L Flat-6		3	(France) Benjamin Roy	6–7
(France) Quattro Racing	Porsche 911 Carrera 4 Cup	Porsche 3.8 L Flat-6		3	(France) Jean-Pierre Tardiff	11
(France) Quattro Racing	Porsche 911 Carrera 4 Cup	Porsche 3.8 L Flat-6		3	(France) Patrick Camus	11
(United Kingdom) Lanzante Motorsport	Porsche 911 GT2	Porsche 3.6 L Turbo Flat-6	G M	6	(United Kingdom) Soames Langton	3–8, 10, 12
(United Kingdom) Lanzante Motorsport	Porsche 911 GT2	Porsche 3.6 L Turbo Flat-6	G M	6	(United States) Paul Burdell	3–8, 10, 12
(United Kingdom) Lanzante Motorsport	Porsche 911 GT2	Porsche 3.6 L Turbo Flat-6	G M	6	(Germany) Wido Rössler	3–8, 10, 12
(France) Yellow Racing	Ferrari F355	Ferrari F129B 3.5 L V8	M	11	(France) Christian Heinkélé	2, 4, 7, 10–11
(France) Yellow Racing	Ferrari F355	Ferrari F129B 3.5 L V8	M	11	(Belgium) Jean-Paul Libert	2
(France) Yellow Racing	Ferrari F355	Ferrari F129B 3.5 L V8	M	11	(France) Lucien Guitteny	4
(France) Yellow Racing	Ferrari F355	Ferrari F129B 3.5 L V8	M	11	(France) François O'Born	7, 10–11
(France) Yellow Racing	Ferrari F355	Ferrari F129B 3.5 L V8	M	11	(Switzerland) Jean Gay	11
(Italy) Renato Mastropietro	Porsche 911 Carrera RSR	Porsche 3.8 L Flat-6		12	(Italy) Renato Mastropietro	3
(Italy) Renato Mastropietro	Porsche 911 Carrera RSR	Porsche 3.8 L Flat-6		12	(Italy) Carlo Rossi	3
(New Zealand) Parr Motorsport	Porsche 911 GT2	Porsche 3.6 L Turbo Flat-6	G	14	(New Zealand) Bill Farmer	6–7, 9
(New Zealand) Parr Motorsport	Porsche 911 GT2	Porsche 3.6 L Turbo Flat-6	G	14	(United Kingdom) Robert Nearn	6–7, 9
(New Zealand) Parr Motorsport	Porsche 911 GT2	Porsche 3.6 L Turbo Flat-6	G	14	(United Kingdom) Paul Edwards	6–7
(New Zealand) Parr Motorsport	Porsche 911 GT2	Porsche 3.6 L Turbo Flat-6	G	14	(New Zealand) Owen Evans	9
(Germany) Mühlbauer Motorsport	Porsche 911 Carrera RSR; Porsche 911 GT2	Porsche 3.8 L Flat-6; Porsche 3.6 L Turbo Flat-6	P	15	(Germany) André Ahrlé	5
(Germany) Mühlbauer Motorsport	Porsche 911 Carrera RSR; Porsche 911 GT2	Porsche 3.8 L Flat-6; Porsche 3.6 L Turbo Flat-6	P	15	(Germany) Frank Böhm	5
(Germany) Mühlbauer Motorsport	Porsche 911 Carrera RSR; Porsche 911 GT2	Porsche 3.8 L Flat-6; Porsche 3.6 L Turbo Flat-6	P	70	(Germany) Detlef Hübner	1–8
(Germany) Mühlbauer Motorsport	Porsche 911 Carrera RSR; Porsche 911 GT2	Porsche 3.8 L Flat-6; Porsche 3.6 L Turbo Flat-6	P	70	(Germany) Stefan Oberndorfer	1–7
(Germany) Mühlbauer Motorsport	Porsche 911 Carrera RSR; Porsche 911 GT2	Porsche 3.8 L Flat-6; Porsche 3.6 L Turbo Flat-6	P	70	(Germany) Ernst Palmberger	1–3
(Germany) Mühlbauer Motorsport	Porsche 911 Carrera RSR; Porsche 911 GT2	Porsche 3.8 L Flat-6; Porsche 3.6 L Turbo Flat-6	P	70	(Germany) André Ahrlé	4, 6
(Germany) Mühlbauer Motorsport	Porsche 911 Carrera RSR; Porsche 911 GT2	Porsche 3.8 L Flat-6; Porsche 3.6 L Turbo Flat-6	P	70	(Germany) Jürgen Barth	8
(Germany) Konrad Motorsport	Porsche 911 Bi-Turbo	Porsche 3.6 L Turbo Flat-6	P	20	(Netherlands) Bert Ploeg	1, 3, 5–6, 8
(Germany) Konrad Motorsport	Porsche 911 Bi-Turbo	Porsche 3.6 L Turbo Flat-6	P	20	(Italy) Giorgio Rebai	1
(Germany) Konrad Motorsport	Porsche 911 Bi-Turbo	Porsche 3.6 L Turbo Flat-6	P	20	(United States) Paul Burdell	2
(Germany) Konrad Motorsport	Porsche 911 Bi-Turbo	Porsche 3.6 L Turbo Flat-6	P	20	(United Kingdom) Soames Langton	2
(Germany) Konrad Motorsport	Porsche 911 Bi-Turbo	Porsche 3.6 L Turbo Flat-6	P	20	(Germany) Wido Rössler	2
(Germany) Konrad Motorsport	Porsche 911 Bi-Turbo	Porsche 3.6 L Turbo Flat-6	P	20	(Austria) Franz Konrad	3, 9, 12
(Germany) Konrad Motorsport	Porsche 911 Bi-Turbo	Porsche 3.6 L Turbo Flat-6	P	20	(Switzerland) Toni Seiler	4–5
(Germany) Konrad Motorsport	Porsche 911 Bi-Turbo	Porsche 3.6 L Turbo Flat-6	P	20	(Germany) Helmut Reis	4
(Germany) Konrad Motorsport	Porsche 911 Bi-Turbo	Porsche 3.6 L Turbo Flat-6	P	20	(Belgium) Hubert de Spiegelaere	6–7
(Germany) Konrad Motorsport	Porsche 911 Bi-Turbo	Porsche 3.6 L Turbo Flat-6	P	20	(Brazil) André Lara-Resende	7
(Germany) Konrad Motorsport	Porsche 911 Bi-Turbo	Porsche 3.6 L Turbo Flat-6	P	20	(Czech Republic) Karel Dolejší	7–8
(Germany) Konrad Motorsport	Porsche 911 Bi-Turbo	Porsche 3.6 L Turbo Flat-6	P	20	(Monaco) Stéphane Ortelli	8
(Germany) Konrad Motorsport	Porsche 911 Bi-Turbo	Porsche 3.6 L Turbo Flat-6	P	20	(Brazil) Antônio Hermann	9
(Germany) Konrad Motorsport	Porsche 911 Bi-Turbo	Porsche 3.6 L Turbo Flat-6	P	20	(France) Bob Wollek	10
(Germany) Konrad Motorsport	Porsche 911 Bi-Turbo	Porsche 3.6 L Turbo Flat-6	P	20	(Germany) André Ahrlé	10
(Germany) Konrad Motorsport	Porsche 911 Bi-Turbo	Porsche 3.6 L Turbo Flat-6	P	20	(France) Jean-Louis Ricci	11
(Germany) Konrad Motorsport	Porsche 911 Bi-Turbo	Porsche 3.6 L Turbo Flat-6	P	20	(Belgium) Michel Neugarten	11
(Germany) Konrad Motorsport	Porsche 911 Bi-Turbo	Porsche 3.6 L Turbo Flat-6	P	20	(Sweden) Örnulf Wirdheim	12
(Germany) Konrad Motorsport	Porsche 911 GT2	Porsche 3.6 L Turbo Flat-6	P	21	(Austria) Franz Konrad	3, 5–8, 10–11
(Germany) Konrad Motorsport	Porsche 911 GT2	Porsche 3.6 L Turbo Flat-6	P	21	(Italy) Marco Rebai	3, 5
(Germany) Konrad Motorsport	Porsche 911 GT2	Porsche 3.6 L Turbo Flat-6	P	21	(Italy) Marco Spinelli	3, 6, 8, 11
(Germany) Konrad Motorsport	Porsche 911 GT2	Porsche 3.6 L Turbo Flat-6	P	21	(Brazil) Antônio Hermann	7
(Germany) Konrad Motorsport	Porsche 911 GT2	Porsche 3.6 L Turbo Flat-6	P	21	(Monaco) Stéphane Ortelli	7
(Germany) Konrad Motorsport	Porsche 911 GT2	Porsche 3.6 L Turbo Flat-6	P	21	(Switzerland) Toni Seiler	8, 10–11
(Germany) Konrad Motorsport	Porsche 911 GT2	Porsche 3.6 L Turbo Flat-6	P	21	(Brazil) André Lara-Resende	10
(Germany) Konrad Motorsport	Porsche 911 Bi-Turbo	Porsche 3.6 L Turbo Flat-6	P	42	(Austria) Frank Schmickler	12
(Germany) Konrad Motorsport	Porsche 911 Bi-Turbo	Porsche 3.6 L Turbo Flat-6	P	42	(Germany) Ernst Schuster	12
(Switzerland) Elf Haberthur Racing	Porsche 911 GT2	Porsche 3.6 L Turbo Flat-6	P	22	(Switzerland) Uwe Sick	2–3
(Switzerland) Elf Haberthur Racing	Porsche 911 GT2	Porsche 3.6 L Turbo Flat-6	P	22	(Switzerland) Peter Zbinden	2–3
(Switzerland) Elf Haberthur Racing	Porsche 911 GT2	Porsche 3.6 L Turbo Flat-6	P	22	(France) Ferdinand de Lesseps	4–9, 12
(Switzerland) Elf Haberthur Racing	Porsche 911 GT2	Porsche 3.6 L Turbo Flat-6	P	22	(Belgium) Michel Neugarten	4–7
(Switzerland) Elf Haberthur Racing	Porsche 911 GT2	Porsche 3.6 L Turbo Flat-6	P	22	(Switzerland) Charles Margueron	4–6, 8–9
(Switzerland) Elf Haberthur Racing	Porsche 911 GT2	Porsche 3.6 L Turbo Flat-6	P	22	(France) Philippe Charriol	8, 12
(Switzerland) Elf Haberthur Racing	Porsche 911 GT2	Porsche 3.6 L Turbo Flat-6	P	22	(France) Richard Balandras	9
(Switzerland) Elf Haberthur Racing	Porsche 911 GT2	Porsche 3.6 L Turbo Flat-6	P	22	(China) Henry Lee	12
(Switzerland) Elf Haberthur Racing	Porsche 911 GT2	Porsche 3.6 L Turbo Flat-6	P	23	(Switzerland) Uwe Sick	5, 8, 10
(Switzerland) Elf Haberthur Racing	Porsche 911 GT2	Porsche 3.6 L Turbo Flat-6	P	23	(Switzerland) Peter Zbinden	5, 8, 10
(Germany) HO Motorsport	Porsche 911 Carrera RSR	Porsche 3.8 L Flat-6	P	24	(Austria) Niki Siokola	2–4
(Germany) HO Motorsport	Porsche 911 Carrera RSR	Porsche 3.8 L Flat-6	P	24	(Austria) Johannes Huber	2–4
(Germany) HO Motorsport	Porsche 911 Carrera RSR	Porsche 3.8 L Flat-6	P	24	(Germany) Harald Grohs	2
(Germany) Seikel Motorsport	Porsche 911 GT2	Porsche 3.6 L Turbo Flat-6	D	32	(Germany) Wolfgang Haugg	1–3
(Germany) Seikel Motorsport	Porsche 911 GT2	Porsche 3.6 L Turbo Flat-6	D	32	(Sweden) Stanley Dickens	1–2
(Germany) Seikel Motorsport	Porsche 911 GT2	Porsche 3.6 L Turbo Flat-6	D	32	(Spain) Balba Camino	1
(Germany) Seikel Motorsport	Porsche 911 GT2	Porsche 3.6 L Turbo Flat-6	D	32	(France) Arnaud Trévisiol	2–5
(Germany) Seikel Motorsport	Porsche 911 GT2	Porsche 3.6 L Turbo Flat-6	D	32	(France) Marc Sourd	3–4
(Germany) Seikel Motorsport	Porsche 911 GT2	Porsche 3.6 L Turbo Flat-6	D	32	(Switzerland) Bernard Thuner	4–5
(Germany) Seikel Motorsport	Porsche 911 GT2	Porsche 3.6 L Turbo Flat-6	D	32	(Germany) Ralf Kelleners	5
(Germany) Seikel Motorsport	Porsche 911 GT2	Porsche 3.6 L Turbo Flat-6	D	32	(Germany) Peter Seikel	9, 12
(Germany) Seikel Motorsport	Porsche 911 GT2	Porsche 3.6 L Turbo Flat-6	D	32	(Austria) Manfred Jurasz	9
(Germany) Seikel Motorsport	Porsche 911 GT2	Porsche 3.6 L Turbo Flat-6	D	32	(Japan) Takashi Suzuki	9
(Germany) Seikel Motorsport	Porsche 911 GT2	Porsche 3.6 L Turbo Flat-6	D	32	(Czech Republic) Karel Dolejší	12
(Germany) Seikel Motorsport	Porsche 911 GT2	Porsche 3.6 L Turbo Flat-6	D	33	(Italy) Giuseppe Quargentan	3, 5, 7–8, 10
(Germany) Seikel Motorsport	Porsche 911 GT2	Porsche 3.6 L Turbo Flat-6	D	33	(Italy) Giovanni da Schio	3
(Germany) Seikel Motorsport	Porsche 911 GT2	Porsche 3.6 L Turbo Flat-6	D	33	(Italy) Girolamo Capra	4, 8
(Germany) Seikel Motorsport	Porsche 911 GT2	Porsche 3.6 L Turbo Flat-6	D	33	(Italy) Raffaele Sangiuolo	4, 8, 10
(Germany) Seikel Motorsport	Porsche 911 GT2	Porsche 3.6 L Turbo Flat-6	D	33	(Spain) Balba Camino	4
(Germany) Seikel Motorsport	Porsche 911 GT2	Porsche 3.6 L Turbo Flat-6	D	33	(Germany) Fritz Müller	5
(Germany) Seikel Motorsport	Porsche 911 GT2	Porsche 3.6 L Turbo Flat-6	D	33	(France) Philippe Auvray	7
(Germany) Seikel Motorsport	Porsche 911 GT2	Porsche 3.6 L Turbo Flat-6	D	33	(Switzerland) Charles Margueron	10
(France) Lotus Equipe	Lotus Esprit Sport 300	Lotus 2.2 L Turbo I4	D	39	(France) Franck Bondrille	2, 7
(France) Lotus Equipe	Lotus Esprit Sport 300	Lotus 2.2 L Turbo I4	D	39	(Italy) Fabio Magnani	2, 11
(France) Lotus Equipe	Lotus Esprit Sport 300	Lotus 2.2 L Turbo I4	D	39	(France) Christophe Cabourg	2
(France) Lotus Equipe	Lotus Esprit Sport 300	Lotus 2.2 L Turbo I4	D	39	(France) Guy Kuster	6–7
(France) Lotus Equipe	Lotus Esprit Sport 300	Lotus 2.2 L Turbo I4	D	39	(France) Olivier Baron	6
(France) Lotus Equipe	Lotus Esprit Sport 300	Lotus 2.2 L Turbo I4	D	39	(France) Patrick Trucco	7
(France) Lotus Equipe	Lotus Esprit Sport 300	Lotus 2.2 L Turbo I4	D	39	(France) Pascal Dro	11
(United Kingdom) Lotus GT Team	Lotus Esprit Sport 300	Lotus 2.2 L Turbo I4	M	45	(United Kingdom) Alex Portman	6, 10, 12
(United Kingdom) Lotus GT Team	Lotus Esprit Sport 300	Lotus 2.2 L Turbo I4	M	45	(Italy) Alessandro Zanardi	6, 10
(United Kingdom) Lotus GT Team	Lotus Esprit Sport 300	Lotus 2.2 L Turbo I4	M	45	(United Kingdom) Chris Goodwin	12
(United Kingdom) John Greasley	Porsche 911 GT2	Porsche 3.6 L Turbo Flat-6	G	46	(United Kingdom) John Greasley	6, 10
(United Kingdom) John Greasley	Porsche 911 GT2	Porsche 3.6 L Turbo Flat-6	G	46	(United Kingdom) John Morrison	6, 10
(France) Larbre Compétition	Porsche 911 Carrera RSR	Porsche 3.8 L Flat-6	M	47	(France) Jean-Luc Chéreau	1–2, 4
(France) Larbre Compétition	Porsche 911 Carrera RSR	Porsche 3.8 L Flat-6	M	47	(France) Jack Leconte	1–2, 4
(France) Larbre Compétition	Porsche 911 Carrera RSR	Porsche 3.8 L Flat-6	M	47	(France) Pierre Yver	1–2, 4
(United Kingdom) Simpson Engineering	Ferrari 348 LM	Ferrari F119 3.4 L V8	P Y	48	(United Kingdom) Robin Smith	1–2, 4–6, 8, 12
(United Kingdom) Simpson Engineering	Ferrari 348 LM	Ferrari F119 3.4 L V8	P Y	48	(Sweden) Tony Ring	1–2, 5, 9, 12
(United Kingdom) Simpson Engineering	Ferrari 348 LM	Ferrari F119 3.4 L V8	P Y	48	(Brazil) Jon Andreescu	4–5
(United Kingdom) Simpson Engineering	Ferrari 348 LM	Ferrari F119 3.4 L V8	P Y	48	(Spain) Isidoro Bajo	4
(United Kingdom) Simpson Engineering	Ferrari 348 LM	Ferrari F119 3.4 L V8	P Y	48	(United Kingdom) Richard Jones	6
(United Kingdom) Simpson Engineering	Ferrari 348 LM	Ferrari F119 3.4 L V8	P Y	48	(Italy) Stefano Sebastiani	6
(United Kingdom) Simpson Engineering	Ferrari 348 LM	Ferrari F119 3.4 L V8	P Y	48	(Sweden) Molte Roggetim	8
(United Kingdom) Simpson Engineering	Ferrari 348 LM	Ferrari F119 3.4 L V8	P Y	48	(Sweden) Kari Mäkinen	8
(United Kingdom) Simpson Engineering	Ferrari 348 LM	Ferrari F119 3.4 L V8	P Y	48	(Japan) Yasutaka Hinoi	9
(United Kingdom) Simpson Engineering	Ferrari 348 LM	Ferrari F119 3.4 L V8	P Y	48	(Japan) Yukio Okamoto	9
(United Kingdom) Simpson Engineering	Porsche 911 GT2	Porsche 3.6 L Turbo Flat-6	G	83	(United Kingdom) Jonathan Baker	10, 12
(United Kingdom) Simpson Engineering	Porsche 911 GT2	Porsche 3.6 L Turbo Flat-6	G	83	(United Kingdom) Gérard MacQuillan	10
(United Kingdom) Simpson Engineering	Porsche 911 GT2	Porsche 3.6 L Turbo Flat-6	G	83	(Netherlands) Hans Hugenholtz Jr.	10
(United Kingdom) Simpson Engineering	Porsche 911 GT2	Porsche 3.6 L Turbo Flat-6	G	83	(United Kingdom) Darren Shaw	12
(United Kingdom) Simpson Engineering	Porsche 911 GT2	Porsche 3.6 L Turbo Flat-6	G	83	(Hong Kong) Adrian Fu	12
(France) Flavian Marçais	Porsche 944 Turbo Cup	Porsche 2.5 L Turbo I4		52	(France) Flavian Marçais	2
(France) Flavian Marçais	Porsche 944 Turbo Cup	Porsche 2.5 L Turbo I4		52	(France) Michel Renavand	2
(United Kingdom) Team Marcos	Marcos LM600	Chevrolet 6.3 L V8	D	53	(United Kingdom) Chris Hodgetts	6, 10
(United Kingdom) Team Marcos	Marcos LM600	Chevrolet 6.3 L V8	D	53	(Netherlands) Cor Euser	6
(United Kingdom) Team Marcos	Marcos LM600	Chevrolet 6.3 L V8	D	53	(United Kingdom) Chris Marsh	6
(United Kingdom) Team Marcos	Marcos LM600	Chevrolet 6.3 L V8	D	53	(Brazil) Thomas Erdos	10
(Switzerland) Stadler Motorsport	Porsche 911 GT2	Porsche 3.6 L Flat-6	P	55	(Switzerland) Enzo Calderari	All
(Switzerland) Stadler Motorsport	Porsche 911 GT2	Porsche 3.6 L Flat-6	P	55	(Switzerland) Lilian Bryner	All
(Switzerland) Stadler Motorsport	Porsche 911 GT2	Porsche 3.6 L Flat-6	P	55	(France) Stéphane Ratel	9
(Switzerland) Stadler Motorsport	Porsche 911 GT2	Porsche 3.6 L Flat-6	P	65	(Italy) Renato Mastropietro	6–7
(Switzerland) Stadler Motorsport	Porsche 911 GT2	Porsche 3.6 L Flat-6	P	65	(Austria) Helmut König	6–7
(Germany) Bernt Racing	Porsche 911 Carrera RSR	Porsche 3.6 L Flat-6	Y	58	(Germany) Gerold Ried	5–9, 12
(Germany) Bernt Racing	Porsche 911 Carrera RSR	Porsche 3.6 L Flat-6	Y	58	(France) Patrick Vuillaume	5–9, 12
(Germany) Bernt Racing	Porsche 911 Carrera RSR	Porsche 3.6 L Flat-6	Y	58	(Germany) Andy Bovensiepen	5–8
(Germany) Bernt Racing	Porsche 911 Carrera RSR	Porsche 3.6 L Flat-6	Y	58	(France) Christian Pellieux	9, 12
(France) Jean-François Véroux	Porsche 911 GT2	Porsche 3.6 L Turbo Flat-6		64	(France) Jean-François Véroux	7, 10
(France) Jean-François Véroux	Porsche 911 GT2	Porsche 3.6 L Turbo Flat-6		64	(France) Eric van de Vyver	7
(France) Jean-François Véroux	Porsche 911 GT2	Porsche 3.6 L Turbo Flat-6		64	(France) Didier de Ortion	7
(France) Jean-François Véroux	Porsche 911 GT2	Porsche 3.6 L Turbo Flat-6		64	(France) Jean-Yves Moine	10
(France) Jean-François Véroux	Porsche 911 GT2	Porsche 3.6 L Turbo Flat-6		64	(France) Stéphane Leloup	10
(France) Jean-François Metz	VBM 4000 GTC	Renault PRV 3.0 L Turbo V6	G	68	(France) Jean-François Metz	7
(France) Jean-François Metz	VBM 4000 GTC	Renault PRV 3.0 L Turbo V6	G	68	(France) Marc Pachot	7
(France) Jean-François Metz	VBM 4000 GTC	Renault PRV 3.0 L Turbo V6	G	68	(France) Patrick Bornhauser	7
(France) Legeay Sports	Alpine A610	Renault PRV 3.0 L Turbo V6		72	(France) Bernard Castagné	7, 11
(France) Legeay Sports	Alpine A610	Renault PRV 3.0 L Turbo V6		72	(France) Patrick Bourdais	7
(France) Legeay Sports	Alpine A610	Renault PRV 3.0 L Turbo V6		72	(France) Benjamin Roy	11
(Switzerland) Callaway Schweiz	Callaway Corvette LM600	Chevrolet 6.2 L V8		74	(Switzerland) Kurt Huber	5
(Switzerland) Callaway Schweiz	Callaway Corvette LM600	Chevrolet 6.2 L V8		74	(Switzerland) Hans Hauser	5
(Switzerland) Callaway Schweiz	Callaway Corvette LM600	Chevrolet 6.2 L V8		74	(Italy) Enrico Bertaggia	5
(United Kingdom) Steve O'Rourke	Porsche 911 GT2	Porsche 3.6 L Turbo Flat-6		76	(United Kingdom) Steve O'Rourke	10
(United Kingdom) Steve O'Rourke	Porsche 911 GT2	Porsche 3.6 L Turbo Flat-6		76	(United Kingdom) Guy Holmes	10
(Italy) Jolly Club	Ferrari F40 GTE	Ferrari F120B 3.0 L Turbo V8	P	77	(Italy) Luca Drudi	3–5
(Italy) Jolly Club	Ferrari F40 GTE	Ferrari F120B 3.0 L Turbo V8	P	77	(Federal Republic of Yugoslavia) Pavle Komnenović	3–5
(Italy) Jolly Club	Ferrari F40 GTE	Ferrari F120B 3.0 L Turbo V8	P	77	(Italy) Marco Brand	3
(Italy) Jolly Club	Ferrari F40 GTE	Ferrari F120B 3.0 L Turbo V8	P	77	(Italy) Vittorio Zoboli	4–5
(United Kingdom) Techspeed TVR	TVR Cerbera	TVR Speed Six 4.5 L I6	D	78	(United Kingdom) Mark Hales	10
(United Kingdom) Techspeed TVR	TVR Cerbera	TVR Speed Six 4.5 L I6	D	78	(United Kingdom) John Kent	10
(United Kingdom) Techspeed TVR	TVR Cerbera	TVR Speed Six 4.5 L I6	D	78	(United Kingdom) Nick Whale	10
(Netherlands) Marcos Racing International	Marcos LM600	Chevrolet 6.3 L V8	D	82	(Netherlands) Cor Euser	10–11
(Netherlands) Marcos Racing International	Marcos LM600	Chevrolet 6.3 L V8	D	82	(United Kingdom) Robert Schirle	10
(Netherlands) Marcos Racing International	Marcos LM600	Chevrolet 6.3 L V8	D	82	(France) Gérard Bacle	11
(France) Rent-A-Car Racing Team	Dodge Viper RT/10	Dodge 8.0 L V10		84	(France) José Close	11
(France) Rent-A-Car Racing Team	Dodge Viper RT/10	Dodge 8.0 L V10		84	(France) Bertrand Balas	11
(France) Rent-A-Car Racing Team	Dodge Viper RT/10	Dodge 8.0 L V10		84	(France) William David	11
(Germany) Roock Racing	Porsche 911 GT2	Porsche 3.6 L Turbo Flat-6		85	(Germany) Ralf Kelleners	11
(Germany) Roock Racing	Porsche 911 GT2	Porsche 3.6 L Turbo Flat-6		85	(United States) Dirk Layer	11
(Germany) Roock Racing	Porsche 911 GT2	Porsche 3.6 L Turbo Flat-6		91	(France) François Lafon	11
(Germany) Roock Racing	Porsche 911 GT2	Porsche 3.6 L Turbo Flat-6		91	(France) Lucien Guitteny	11
(Germany) Roock Racing	Porsche 911 GT2	Porsche 3.6 L Turbo Flat-6		91	(France) Jean-Marc Smadja	11
(Spain) GT Sport Time	Venturi 400GTR	Renault PRV 3.0 L Turbo V6	P	87	(Spain) Javier Camp	4, 9
(Spain) GT Sport Time	Venturi 400GTR	Renault PRV 3.0 L Turbo V6	P	87	(Spain) Antonio Puig	4, 9
(Germany) Fred Laufer Racing	Porsche 911 GT2	Porsche 3.6 L Turbo Flat-6		88	(France) Henri Pescarolo	5
(Germany) Fred Laufer Racing	Porsche 911 GT2	Porsche 3.6 L Turbo Flat-6		88	(United Kingdom) Rupert Keegan	5

== Season results ==
Overall winner in bold.

1995 BPR Kärcher Global Endurance GT Series Results
Rnd	Circuit	GT1 Winning Team	GT2 Winning Team	GT3 Winning Team	GT4 Winning Team	Results
Rnd	Circuit	GT1 Winning Drivers	GT2 Winning Drivers	GT3 Winning Drivers	GT4 Winning Drivers	Results
1	Jerez	**(United Kingdom) #1 Gulf Racing GTC**	Did not participate	(Switzerland) #55 Stadler Motorsport	Did not participate	Results
1	Jerez	**(United Kingdom) Ray Bellm** **(Brazil) Maurizio Sandro Sala**	Did not participate	(Switzerland) Lilian Bryner (Switzerland) Enzo Calderari	Did not participate	Results
2	Paul Ricard	**(United Kingdom) #1 Gulf Racing GTC**	(France) #29 Crisal Competition	(Germany) #20 Konrad Motorsport	(Italy) #36 Ruggero Grassi	Results
2	Paul Ricard	**(United Kingdom) Ray Bellm** **(Brazil) Maurizio Sandro Sala**	(France) Patrick Guillot (France) Jérôme Brarda (Switzerland) Pierre Müller	(United States) Paul Burdell (United Kingdom) Soames Langton (Germany) Wido Rössler	(Italy) Ruggero Grassi (Italy) Mario Passerini (France) Ermanno Colombo	Results
3	Monza	**(United Kingdom) #8 West Competition**	Did not participate	(Germany) #20 Konrad Motorsport	(Italy) #35 Ruggero Grassi	Results
3	Monza	**(Germany) Thomas Bscher** **(Denmark) John Nielsen**	Did not participate	(Austria) Franz Konrad (Netherlands) Bert Ploeg	(Italy) Napoleone Monti (Italy) Giuseppe Giovenzana (Italy) Massimo Morini	Results
4	Jarama	**(United Kingdom) #1 Gulf Racing GTC**	(France) #62 Cobras Organisation	(Switzerland) #55 Stadler Motorsport	(Germany) #58 Bernt Racing	Results
4	Jarama	**(United Kingdom) Ray Bellm** **(Brazil) Maurizio Sandro Sala**	(France) Guy Broissiat (Switzerland) Michel Mora	(Switzerland) Lilian Bryner (Switzerland) Enzo Calderari	(Germany) Gerold Ried (Germany) Andy Bovensiepen	Results
5	Nürburgring	**(United Kingdom) #1 Gulf Racing GTC**	(France) #29 Crisal Competition	(Switzerland) #55 Stadler Motorsport	(Germany) #31 Seikel Motorsport	Results
5	Nürburgring	**(United Kingdom) Ray Bellm** **(Brazil) Maurizio Sandro Sala**	(France) Thiérry Guiod (France) Philippe Smaniotto	(Switzerland) Lilian Bryner (Switzerland) Enzo Calderari	(Germany) Hermann Bilz (Germany) Fred Rosterg	Results
6	Donington	**(United Kingdom) #8 West Competition**	Did not participate	(Switzerland) #65 Stadler Motorsport	(Germany) #59 Bernt Racing	Results
6	Donington	**(Germany) Thomas Bscher** **(Denmark) John Nielsen**	Did not participate	(Germany) Helmut König (Italy) Renato Mastropietro	(Belgium) Philippe de Craene (Belgium) Didier de Puysseleyr	Results
7	Montlhéry	(France) #44 Promo Racing Car	(France) #57 Raymond Touroul	**(Germany) #70 Muhlbauer Motorsport**	(Germany) #31 Seikel Motorsport	Results
7	Montlhéry	(France) Michel Faraut (France) François Birbeau (France) Éric Graham	(France) Thierry Perrier (France) Raymond Touroul (France) Jean-Pierre Tardiff	**(Germany) Stefan Oberndorfer** **(Germany) Detler Hübner**	(Italy) Raffaele Sangiuolo (Austria) Manfred Jurasz (France) Serge Coudert	Results
8	Anderstorp	**(France) #40 Pilot Aldix Racing**	Did not participate	(Germany) #21 Konrad Motorsport	(Germany) #59 Bernt Racing	Results
8	Anderstorp	**(France) Michel Ferté** **(France) Olivier Thévenin**	Did not participate	(Italy) Marco Spinelli (Austria) Franz Konrad (Switzerland) Toni Seiler	(Belgium) Philippe de Craene (Belgium) Didier de Puysseleyr	Results
9	Suzuka	**(United Kingdom) #1 GTC Racing**	(Japan) #31 Cobra Racing Team	(Switzerland) #55 Stadler Motorsport	Did not participate	Results
9	Suzuka	**(United Kingdom) Ray Bellm** **(Brazil) Maurizio Sandro Sala** **(Japan) Masanori Sekiya**	(Japan) Katsunori Iketani (Japan) Hiroyuki Nodi (Japan) Seiichi Sodeyama	(Switzerland) Lilian Bryner (Switzerland) Enzo Calderari (France) Stéphane Ratel	Did not participate	Results
10	Silverstone	**(United Kingdom) #9 Mach One Racing**	No finishers	(United Kingdom) #45 Lotus GT Team	(Germany) #59 Bernt Racing	Results
10	Silverstone	**(United Kingdom) Andy Wallace** **(France) Olivier Grouillard**	No finishers	(United Kingdom) Alex Portman (Italy) Alessandro Zanardi	(Belgium) Philippe de Craene (Belgium) Didier Delente (Belgium) Didier de Puysseleyr	Results
11	Nogaro	**(United Kingdom) #9 Mach One Racing**	(France) #57 Raymond Touroul	(Switzerland) #55 Stadler Motorsport	(Germany) #31 Seikel Motorsport	Results
11	Nogaro	**(United Kingdom) Andy Wallace** **(France) Olivier Grouillard**	(France) Raymond Touroul (France) Didier Ortion (France) François Jakubowski	(Switzerland) Lilian Bryner (Switzerland) Enzo Calderari	(Germany) Hermann Bilz (Germany) Peter Seikel	Results
12	Zhuhai	**(United Kingdom) #9 Mach One Racing**	Did not participate	(Switzerland) #55 Stadler Motorsport	(China) #93 Mega Speed	Results
12	Zhuhai	**(United Kingdom) Andy Wallace** **(France) Olivier Grouillard**	Did not participate	(Switzerland) Lilian Bryner (Switzerland) Enzo Calderari	(Hong Kong) Alex Li (Hong Kong) Andrew Lo (United Kingdom) Brian Whillock	Results

== Bibliography ==
- Jean-Marc Teissèdre & Michael Cotton (1996). GT Endurance 1995. GSN Editions. ISBN 978-2930120072.
