= 1988 800 km of Jerez =

Layout of the Circuito Permanente de Jerez (1985-1992)

The 1988 800 km of Jerez was the opening round of the 1988 World Sportscar Championship season. It took place at Circuito Permanente de Jerez, Spain on March 6, 1988. It was the third and final running of the 800 km of Jerez as part of the World Sportscar Championship.

== Official results ==
Class winners are in bold. Cars failing to complete 75% of the winner's distance are marked as Not Classified (NC).

Pos	Class	No	Team	Drivers	Chassis	Tyre	Laps
Pos	Class	No	Team	Drivers	Engine	Tyre	Laps
1	**C1**	**61**	**(Switzerland) Team Sauber Mercedes**	**(France) Jean-Louis Schlesser (Germany) Jochen Mass (Italy) Mauro Baldi**	**Sauber C9**	**MI**	**190**
1	**C1**	**61**	**(Switzerland) Team Sauber Mercedes**	**(France) Jean-Louis Schlesser (Germany) Jochen Mass (Italy) Mauro Baldi**	**Mercedes-Benz M117 5.0L Turbo V8**	**MI**	**190**
2	C1	3	(United Kingdom) Silk Cut Jaguar	(United Kingdom) John Watson (United Kingdom) Andy Wallace (Denmark) John Nielsen	Jaguar XJR-9	**D**	190
2	C1	3	(United Kingdom) Silk Cut Jaguar	(United Kingdom) John Watson (United Kingdom) Andy Wallace (Denmark) John Nielsen	Jaguar 7.0L V12	**D**	190
3	C1	7	(Germany) Joest Racing	(Germany) Klaus Ludwig (France) Bob Wollek	Porsche 962C	**G**	188
3	C1	7	(Germany) Joest Racing	(Germany) Klaus Ludwig (France) Bob Wollek	Porsche Type-935 3.0L Turbo Flat-6	**G**	188
4	C1	14	(United Kingdom) Richard Lloyd Racing	(United Kingdom) James Weaver (United Kingdom) Derek Bell	Porsche 962C GTi	**G**	184
4	C1	14	(United Kingdom) Richard Lloyd Racing	(United Kingdom) James Weaver (United Kingdom) Derek Bell	Porsche Type-935 3.0L Turbo Flat-6	**G**	184
5	C1	8	(Germany) Joest Racing	(Germany) Frank Jelinski (Germany) "John Winter"	Porsche 962C	**G**	183
5	C1	8	(Germany) Joest Racing	(Germany) Frank Jelinski (Germany) "John Winter"	Porsche Type-935 3.0L Turbo Flat-6	**G**	183
6	C1	5	(Switzerland) Brun Motorsport	(Germany) Manuel Reuter (Germany) Uwe Schäfer	Porsche 962C	**MI**	183
6	C1	5	(Switzerland) Brun Motorsport	(Germany) Manuel Reuter (Germany) Uwe Schäfer	Porsche Type-935 3.0L Turbo Flat-6	**MI**	183
7	**C2**	**111**	**(United Kingdom) Spice Engineering**	**(United Kingdom) Ray Bellm (United Kingdom) Gordon Spice**	**Spice SE88C**	**G**	**180**
7	**C2**	**111**	**(United Kingdom) Spice Engineering**	**(United Kingdom) Ray Bellm (United Kingdom) Gordon Spice**	**Ford Cosworth DFL 3.3L V8**	**G**	**180**
8	C2	121	(United Kingdom) Cosmik GP Motorsport	(France) Philippe de Henning (Greece) Costas Los	Spice SE87C	**G**	178
8	C2	121	(United Kingdom) Cosmik GP Motorsport	(France) Philippe de Henning (Greece) Costas Los	Ford Cosworth DFL 3.3L V8	**G**	178
9	C1	40	(Switzerland) Swiss Team Salamin	(Switzerland) Enzo Calderari (Switzerland) Antoine Salamin	Porsche 962C	**G**	174
9	C1	40	(Switzerland) Swiss Team Salamin	(Switzerland) Enzo Calderari (Switzerland) Antoine Salamin	Porsche Type-935 3.0L Turbo Flat-6	**G**	174
10	C2	107	(United Kingdom) Chamberlain Engineering	(France) Claude Ballot-Léna (France) Jean-Louis Ricci	Spice SE88C	**A**	173
10	C2	107	(United Kingdom) Chamberlain Engineering	(France) Claude Ballot-Léna (France) Jean-Louis Ricci	Ford Cosworth DFL 3.3L V8	**A**	173
11	C2	117	(Norway) Team Lucky Strike Schanche	(Norway) Martin Schanche (United Kingdom) Will Hoy	Argo JM19C	**G**	172
11	C2	117	(Norway) Team Lucky Strike Schanche	(Norway) Martin Schanche (United Kingdom) Will Hoy	Ford Cosworth DFL 3.3L V8	**G**	172
12	C1	4	(Switzerland) Brun Motorsport	(Argentina) Oscar Larrauri (Italy) Massimo Sigala	Porsche 962C	**MI**	167
12	C1	4	(Switzerland) Brun Motorsport	(Argentina) Oscar Larrauri (Italy) Massimo Sigala	Porsche Type-935 3.0L Turbo Flat-6	**MI**	167
13	C2	123	(United Kingdom) Charles Ivey Racing	(South Africa) Wayne Taylor (United Kingdom) Tim Harvey	Tiga GC287	**D**	167
13	C2	123	(United Kingdom) Charles Ivey Racing	(South Africa) Wayne Taylor (United Kingdom) Tim Harvey	Porsche Type-935 2.8L Turbo Flat-6	**D**	167
14	C2	109	(Italy) Kelmar Racing	(Italy) Ranieri Randaccio (Italy) Paolo Ciafardoni (Italy) Maurizio Gellini	Tiga GC85	**A**	165
14	C2	109	(Italy) Kelmar Racing	(Italy) Ranieri Randaccio (Italy) Paolo Ciafardoni (Italy) Maurizio Gellini	Ford Cosworth DFL 3.3L V8	**A**	165
15	C2	106	(Italy) Kelmar Racing	(Italy) Pasquale Barberio (Italy) Vito Veninata	Tiga GC288	**A**	133
15	C2	106	(Italy) Kelmar Racing	(Italy) Pasquale Barberio (Italy) Vito Veninata	Ford Cosworth DFL 3.3L V8	**A**	133
16 NC	C2	115	(United Kingdom) ADA Engineering	(United Kingdom) Steve Kempton (United Kingdom) Dudley Wood (United Kingdom) Johnny Herbert	ADA 03	**G**	131
16 NC	C2	115	(United Kingdom) ADA Engineering	(United Kingdom) Steve Kempton (United Kingdom) Dudley Wood (United Kingdom) Johnny Herbert	Ford Cosworth DFL 3.3L V8	**G**	131
17 DNF	C1	1	(United Kingdom) Silk Cut Jaguar	(United Kingdom) Martin Brundle (United States) Eddie Cheever	Jaguar XJR-9	**D**	139
17 DNF	C1	1	(United Kingdom) Silk Cut Jaguar	(United Kingdom) Martin Brundle (United States) Eddie Cheever	Jaguar 7.0L V12	**D**	139
18 DNF	C1	2	(United Kingdom) Silk Cut Jaguar	(Netherlands) Jan Lammers (United Kingdom) Johnny Dumfries	Jaguar XJR-9	**D**	132
18 DNF	C1	2	(United Kingdom) Silk Cut Jaguar	(Netherlands) Jan Lammers (United Kingdom) Johnny Dumfries	Jaguar 7.0L V12	**D**	132
19 DNF	C2	103	(United Kingdom) Spice Engineering	(Italy) Almo Coppelli (Denmark) Thorkild Thyrring	Spice SE88C	**G**	131
19 DNF	C2	103	(United Kingdom) Spice Engineering	(Italy) Almo Coppelli (Denmark) Thorkild Thyrring	Ford Cosworth DFL 3.3L V8	**G**	131
20 DNF	C2	178	(France) Automobiles Louis Descartes	(France) Sylvain Bouley (France) Louis Descartes (France) Gérard Tremblay	ALD C2	**A**	130
20 DNF	C2	178	(France) Automobiles Louis Descartes	(France) Sylvain Bouley (France) Louis Descartes (France) Gérard Tremblay	BMW M80 3.5L I6	**A**	130
21 DNF	C1	6	(Switzerland) Brun Motorsport	(Switzerland) Walter Brun (Spain) Jesús Pareja	Porsche 962C	**MI**	44
21 DNF	C1	6	(Switzerland) Brun Motorsport	(Switzerland) Walter Brun (Spain) Jesús Pareja	Porsche Type-935 3.0L Turbo Flat-6	**MI**	44
22 DNF	C2	101	(Italy) Dollop Racing	(Italy) Nicola Marozzo (Switzerland) Jean-Pierre Frey	Argo JM19B	**G**	44
22 DNF	C2	101	(Italy) Dollop Racing	(Italy) Nicola Marozzo (Switzerland) Jean-Pierre Frey	Motori Moderni 2.0L Turbo V6	**G**	44
23 DNF	C2	127	(United Kingdom) Chamberlain Engineering	(South Africa) Graham Duxbury (United Kingdom) Nick Adams	Spice SE86C	**A**	15
23 DNF	C2	127	(United Kingdom) Chamberlain Engineering	(South Africa) Graham Duxbury (United Kingdom) Nick Adams	Hart 418T 1.8L Turbo I4	**A**	15
DNS	C2	172	(France) Automobiles Louis Descartes	(France) Pierre Yver (France) Bruno Sotty	ALD C2	**A**	-
DNS	C2	172	(France) Automobiles Louis Descartes	(France) Pierre Yver (France) Bruno Sotty	BMW M80 3.5L I6	**A**	-
DNS	C2	188	(United Kingdom) Ark Racing	(United Kingdom) Max Payne (Morocco) Max Cohen-Olivar	Ceekar 83J	?	-
DNS	C2	188	(United Kingdom) Ark Racing	(United Kingdom) Max Payne (Morocco) Max Cohen-Olivar	Ford Cosworth DFL 3.3L V8	?	-

== Statistics ==
- Pole Position - #61 Team Sauber Mercedes - 1:28.670
- Average Speed - 151.186 km/h

World Sportscar Championship
Previous race: None	1988 season	Next race: 1988 360km of Jarama
