= 4 Hours of Jerez =

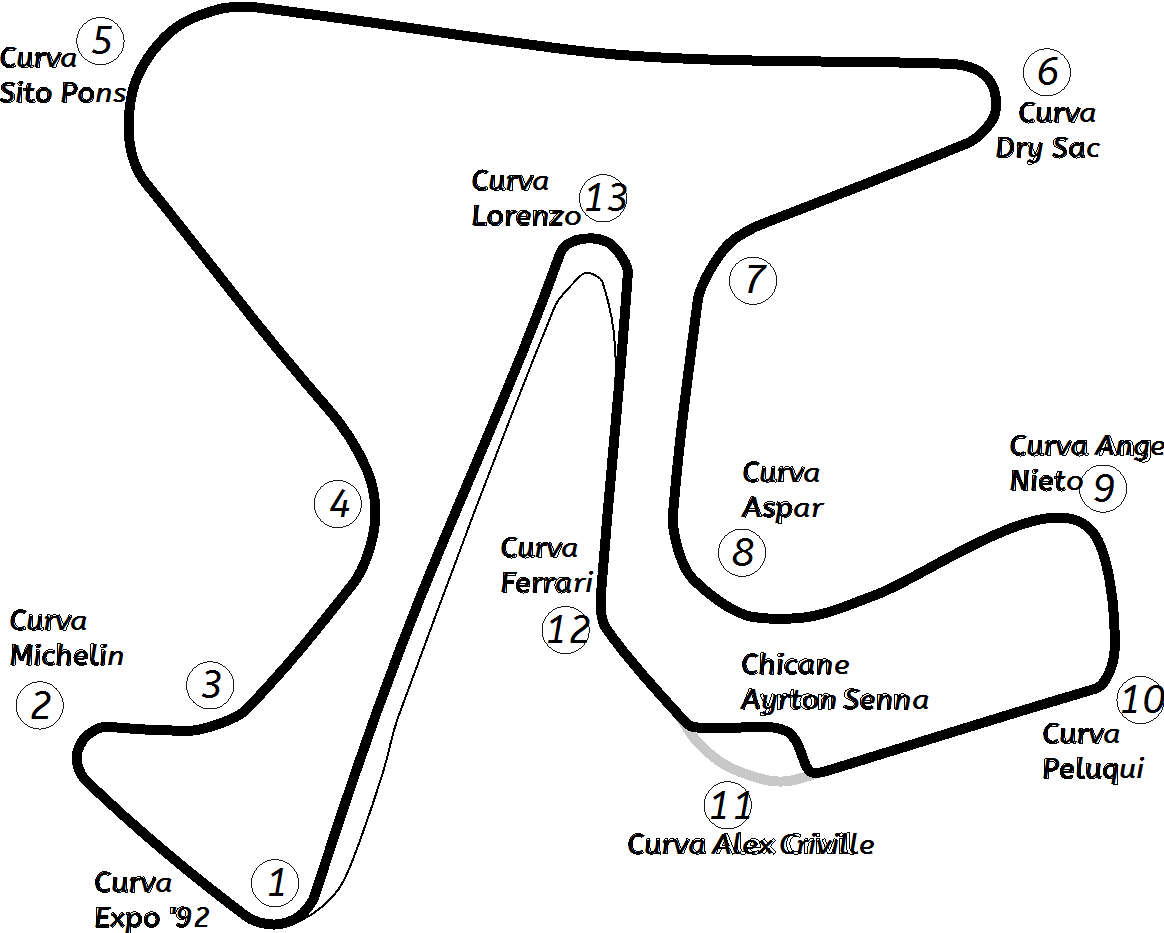

Asian Le Mans Series
- Venue: Circuito de Jerez – Ángel Nieto
- First race: 1986
- First AsLMS race: 2027 (scheduled)
- Duration: 4 hours
- Previous names: 360 km of Jerez; 800 km of Jerez; 1000 km of Jerez
- Most wins (driver): Nine drivers with one win (see below)
- Most wins (team): Four teams with one win (see below)
- Most wins (manufacturer): One win each for: (United Kingdom) Jaguar; (United Kingdom) McLaren; (Germany) Porsche; (Switzerland) Sauber-Mercedes

The 4 Hours of Jerez (Note: Previously held as the 360 km of Jerez, 800 km of Jerez and 1000 km of Jerez.) is an endurance race for sports cars, held at the Circuito de Jerez in Jerez de la Frontera, Spain. The race was held as part of the World Sportscar Championship between 1986 and 1988 and as part of the BPR Global GT Series in 1995. The race is due to be revived in 2027 as part of the Asian Le Mans Series calendar.

== History ==
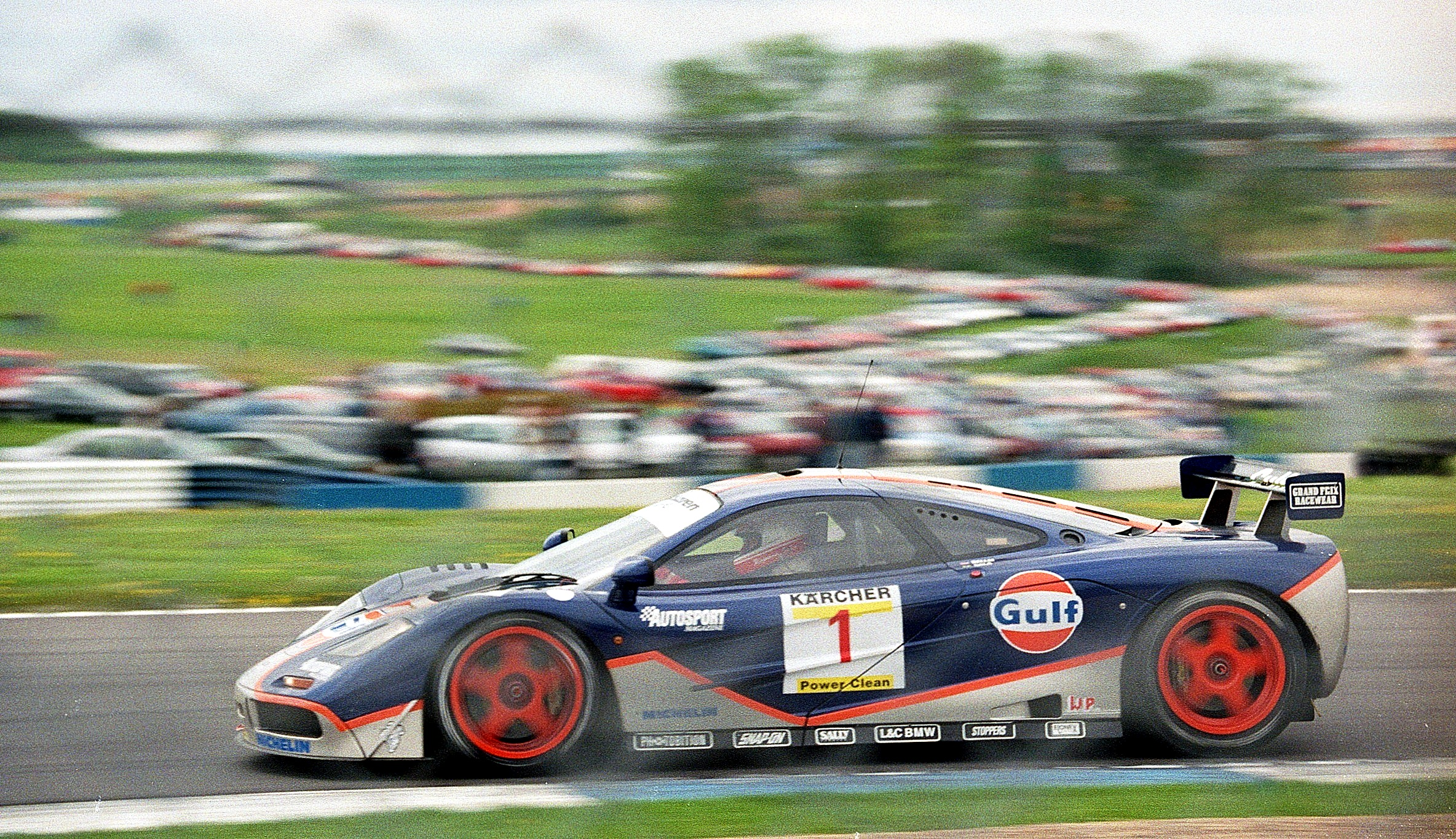
The #1 McLaren F1 GTR with which Bellm and Sandro Sala won the 1995 event.

An endurance race for sports cars was held for the first time at Jerez in 1986, with an event marketed as the Trofeo Silk Cut scheduled to cover 360 kilometres (220 mi) held as the sixth round of the 1986 World Sports Prototype Championship (WSPC). Due to its relatively short distance compared to other races on the WSPC calendar, this race only counted points towards the Drivers' Championship, and not the Teams' Championship. The inaugural event was won overall by Oscar Larrauri and Jesús Pareja driving the #18 Porsche 962C for Brun Motorsport; victory in the C2 class was secured by Ray Bellm and Gordon Spice driving the #70 Spice SE86C for Spice Engineering.

For the following event in 1987, the race was moved to the second round of the WSPC calendar and the scheduled race distance was extended to 1,000 kilometres (620 mi), meaning that the race began to count points towards the Teams' Championship for the first time. However, a lengthy caution period resulted in the race hitting the 6-hour time limit after only 890 kilometres (550 mi). The shortened race was won overall by Raul Boesel and Eddie Cheever driving the #4 Jaguar XJR-8 for Silk Cut Jaguar; victory in the C2 class went to Gordon Spice for the second year in a row alongside Fermín Vélez, driving the #111 Spice SE86C for Spice Engineering.

Following the shortening of the previous year's event, the scheduled distance for the 1988 race was brought down to 800 kilometres (500 mi), and this was successfully run to completion. The event was also moved to become the opening round of the rebranded World Sportscar Championship (WSC) calendar. The 1988 event was won overall by Mauro Baldi, Jochen Mass and Jean-Louis Schlesser driving the #61 Sauber-Mercedes C9 for Team Sauber Mercedes. Victory in the C2 class once again went to Gordon Spice (for the third year in a row) and Ray Bellm (for the second time in three years), both behind the wheel of the updated #111 Spice SE88C for Spice Engineering, that team's third class victory in a row.

The round at Jerez was dropped from the WSC calendar from 1989, and did not return. The event was briefly revived in 1995 as the BPR 4 Hours of Jerez as part of the BPR Global GT Series, however this arrangement was only in place for one year. The 1995 race was won overall by Ray Bellm – his first overall victory at Jerez following two secondary class victories – driving alongside Maurizio Sandro Sala in the #1 McLaren F1 GTR for Gulf Racing GTC. The GT3 class was won by Lilian Bryner and Enzo Calderari driving the #55 Porsche 911 GT2 for Stadler Motorsport.

The one-off revival of the event in 1995 is the final time an endurance race has been held at Jerez as of 2026. However, on 3 August 2026, it was announced that the second round of the 2026–27 Asian Le Mans Series would be held at the circuit in January 2027, consisting of a pair of 4-hour races. The round at Jerez was announced as part of an all-European calendar for that season of the Asian Le Mans Series as a result of security and logistical challenges with the traditional Middle Eastern race venues due to the Iran war.

== Results ==
Year	Drivers	Team	Car	Time	Laps	Distance	Championship	Full results
1986	(Argentina) Oscar Larrauri (Spain) Jesús Pareja	(Switzerland) Brun Motorsport	Porsche 962C	2:27:47.34	86	362.7 km (225.4 mi)	World Sports Prototype Championship	report
1987	(Brazil) Raul Boesel (United States) Eddie Cheever	(United Kingdom) Silk Cut Jaguar	Jaguar XJR-8	6:01:15.46	211	890.0 km (553.0 mi)	World Sports Prototype Championship	report
1988	(Italy) Mauro Baldi (West Germany) Jochen Mass (France) Jean-Louis Schlesser	(Switzerland) Team Sauber Mercedes	Sauber-Mercedes C9	5:18:03.15	190	801.4 km (498.0 mi)	World Sportscar Championship	report
1989–1994: Not held
1995	(United Kingdom) Ray Bellm (Brazil) Maurizio Sandro Sala	(United Kingdom) Gulf Racing GTC	McLaren F1 GTR	4:00:14.83	123	544.0 km (338.0 mi)	BPR Global GT Series	report
1996–2026: Not held
2027 (Race 1)	Upcoming race			4 hours (scheduled)			Asian Le Mans Series	report
2027 (Race 2)	Upcoming race			4 hours (scheduled)			Asian Le Mans Series	report

== Records ==
=== Wins by driver ===
Rank	Constructor	Wins	Years
1	(Argentina) Oscar Larrauri	1	1986
1	(Spain) Jesús Pareja	1	1986
1	(Brazil) Raul Boesel	1	1987
1	(United States) Eddie Cheever	1	1987
1	(Italy) Mauro Baldi	1	1988
1	(West Germany) Jochen Mass	1	1988
1	(France) Jean-Louis Schlesser	1	1988
1	(United Kingdom) Ray Bellm	1	1995
1	(Brazil) Maurizio Sandro Sala	1	1995

=== Wins by constructor ===
Rank	Constructor	Wins	Years
1	(Germany) Porsche	1	1986
1	(United Kingdom) Jaguar	1	1987
1	(Switzerland) Sauber-Mercedes	1	1988
1	(United Kingdom) McLaren	1	1995

=== Wins by engine manufacturer ===
Rank	Constructor	Wins	Years
1	(Germany) Porsche	1	1986
1	(United Kingdom) Jaguar	1	1987
1	(Germany) Mercedes-Benz	1	1988
1	(Germany) BMW	1	1995

=== Wins by team ===
Rank	Constructor	Wins	Years
1	(Switzerland) Brun Motorsport	1	1986
1	(United Kingdom) Silk Cut Jaguar	1	1987
1	(Switzerland) Team Sauber Mercedes	1	1988
1	(United Kingdom) Gulf Racing GTC	1	1995
