= 1995 BPR 4 Hours of Jerez =

Layout of Circuito de Jerez

The 1995 BPR 4 Hours of Jerez was the first round of the 1995 BPR Global GT Series season. It was run at Circuito de Jerez on 26 February 1995. It was the first, and only, running of the 4 Hours of Jerez as part of the BPR Global GT Series.

Ray Bellm and Maurizio Sandro Sala won the GT1 class and took overall victory, claiming McLaren's first sports car racing win in over two decades. The GT3 class was won by Lilian Bryner and Enzo Calderari in a Porsche 911 GT2.

== Official results ==
Class winners in bold. Cars failing to complete 75% of winner's distance marked as Not Classified (NC).

Pos	Class	No	Team	Drivers	Chassis	Tyre	Laps
Pos	Class	No	Team	Drivers	Engine	Tyre	Laps
1	**GT1**	**1**	(United Kingdom) **Gulf Racing GTC**	**(United Kingdom) Ray Bellm** **(Brazil) Maurizio Sandro Sala**	**McLaren F1 GTR**	MI	**123**
1	**GT1**	**1**	(United Kingdom) **Gulf Racing GTC**	**(United Kingdom) Ray Bellm** **(Brazil) Maurizio Sandro Sala**	**BMW S70/2 6.1 L V12**	MI	**123**
2	GT1	86	(France) Larbre Compétition	(France) Jean-Pierre Jarier (France) Bob Wollek (France) Christophe Bouchut	Porsche 911 GT2 Evo	MI	123
2	GT1	86	(France) Larbre Compétition	(France) Jean-Pierre Jarier (France) Bob Wollek (France) Christophe Bouchut	Porsche M64/60 3.6 L Turbo Flat-6	MI	123
3	**GT3**	**55**	**(Switzerland) Stadler Motorsport**	**(Switzerland) Enzo Calderari** **(Switzerland) Lilian Bryner**	**Porsche 911 GT2**	P	**120**
3	**GT3**	**55**	**(Switzerland) Stadler Motorsport**	**(Switzerland) Enzo Calderari** **(Switzerland) Lilian Bryner**	**Porsche M64/60 3.6 L Turbo Flat-6**	P	**120**
4	GT1	30	(Germany) Obermaier Racing	(Germany) Friedrich Leinemann (Germany) Otto Altenbach	Porsche 911 Bi-Turbo	G	119
4	GT1	30	(Germany) Obermaier Racing	(Germany) Friedrich Leinemann (Germany) Otto Altenbach	Porsche M64/50 3.6 L Turbo Flat-6	G	119
5	GT3	20	(Germany) Konrad Motorsport	(Netherlands) Bert Ploeg (Italy) Giorgio Rebai	Porsche 911 Bi-Turbo	P	119
5	GT3	20	(Germany) Konrad Motorsport	(Netherlands) Bert Ploeg (Italy) Giorgio Rebai	Porsche M64/50 3.6 L Turbo Flat-6	P	119
6	GT3	47	(France) Larbre Compétition	(France) Jean-Luc Chéreau (France) Jack Leconte (France) Pierre Yver	Porsche 911 Carrera RSR	MI	116
6	GT3	47	(France) Larbre Compétition	(France) Jean-Luc Chéreau (France) Jack Leconte (France) Pierre Yver	Porsche M64/04 3.8 L Flat-6	MI	116
7	GT3	70	(Germany) Mühlbauer Motorsport	(Germany) Detlef Hübner (Germany) Stefan Oberndorfer (Germany) Ernst Palmberger	Porsche 911 Carrera RSR	P	116
7	GT3	70	(Germany) Mühlbauer Motorsport	(Germany) Detlef Hübner (Germany) Stefan Oberndorfer (Germany) Ernst Palmberger	Porsche M64/04 3.8 L Flat-6	P	116
8	GT1	56	(France) BBA Compétition	(France) Jean-Luc Maury-Laribière (Switzerland) Laurent Lécuyer (France) Pascal Fabre	Venturi 600 LM	D	113
8	GT1	56	(France) BBA Compétition	(France) Jean-Luc Maury-Laribière (Switzerland) Laurent Lécuyer (France) Pascal Fabre	Renault PRV 3.0 L Turbo V6	D	113
9	GT1 (3)	10	(Germany) Kremer Racing	(Spain) Tomás Saldaña (Spain) Alfonso de Orléans-Borbón	Porsche 911 GT2	G	113
9	GT1 (3)	10	(Germany) Kremer Racing	(Spain) Tomás Saldaña (Spain) Alfonso de Orléans-Borbón	Porsche M64/60 3.6 L Turbo Flat-6	G	113
10	GT1	21	(Germany) Konrad Motorsport	(Austria) Franz Konrad (France) Ferdinand de Lesseps	Porsche 911 Bi-Turbo	P	109
10	GT1	21	(Germany) Konrad Motorsport	(Austria) Franz Konrad (France) Ferdinand de Lesseps	Porsche M64/50 3.6 L Turbo Flat-6	P	109
11	GT3	48	(United Kingdom) Simpson Engineering	(United Kingdom) Robin Smith (Sweden) Tony Ring	Ferrari 348 LM	P	107
11	GT3	48	(United Kingdom) Simpson Engineering	(United Kingdom) Robin Smith (Sweden) Tony Ring	Ferrari F119 3.4 L V8	P	107
DNF	GT1	8	(United Kingdom) West Competition	(Denmark) John Nielsen (Germany) Thomas Bscher	McLaren F1 GTR	G	119
DNF	GT1	8	(United Kingdom) West Competition	(Denmark) John Nielsen (Germany) Thomas Bscher	BMW S70/2 6.1 L V12	G	119
DNF	GT1	50	(Germany) Freisinger Motorsport	(Germany) Wolfgang Kaufmann (France) Michel Ligonnet	Porsche 911 Bi-Turbo	G	103
DNF	GT1	50	(Germany) Freisinger Motorsport	(Germany) Wolfgang Kaufmann (France) Michel Ligonnet	Porsche M64/50 3.6 L Turbo Flat-6	G	103
DNF	GT1	40	(France) Pilot Aldix Racing	(Belgium) Michel Neugarten (France) Paul Belmondo (Spain) Santiago Puig	Ferrari F40 LM	MI	101
DNF	GT1	40	(France) Pilot Aldix Racing	(Belgium) Michel Neugarten (France) Paul Belmondo (Spain) Santiago Puig	Ferrari F120B 3.0 L Turbo V8	MI	101
DNF	GT1	3	(United Kingdom) Gulf Racing GTC	(France) Pierre-Henri Raphanel (United Kingdom) Lindsay Owen-Jones	McLaren F1 GTR	MI	63
DNF	GT1	3	(United Kingdom) Gulf Racing GTC	(France) Pierre-Henri Raphanel (United Kingdom) Lindsay Owen-Jones	BMW S70/2 6.1 L V12	MI	63
DNF	GT3	32	(Germany) Seikel Motorsport	(Germany) Wolfgang Haugg (Sweden) Stanley Dickens (Spain) Balba Camino	Porsche 911 GT2	D	44
DNF	GT3	32	(Germany) Seikel Motorsport	(Germany) Wolfgang Haugg (Sweden) Stanley Dickens (Spain) Balba Camino	Porsche M64/60 3.6 L Turbo Flat-6	D	44
DNF	GT1	37	(United Kingdom) ADA Engineering	(Denmark) Thorkild Thyrring (United Kingdom) Andy Wallace	De Tomaso Pantera	G	14
DNF	GT1	37	(United Kingdom) ADA Engineering	(Denmark) Thorkild Thyrring (United Kingdom) Andy Wallace	Ford 5.0 L V8	G	14
DNS	GT1	44	(France) Promo Racing Car	(France) Éric Graham (France) François Birbeau (France) Michel Faraut	Venturi 600LM	D	0
DNS	GT1	44	(France) Promo Racing Car	(France) Éric Graham (France) François Birbeau (France) Michel Faraut	Renault PRV 3.0 L Turbo V6	D	0

== Statistics ==
- Pole Position - #3 Gulf Racing GTC - 1:47.300
- Fastest Lap - #8 West Competition - 1:49.680

BPR Global GT Series
Previous race: none	1995 season	Next race: Le Castellet
