= John Hugenholtz =

Dutch racetrack designer (1914–1995)

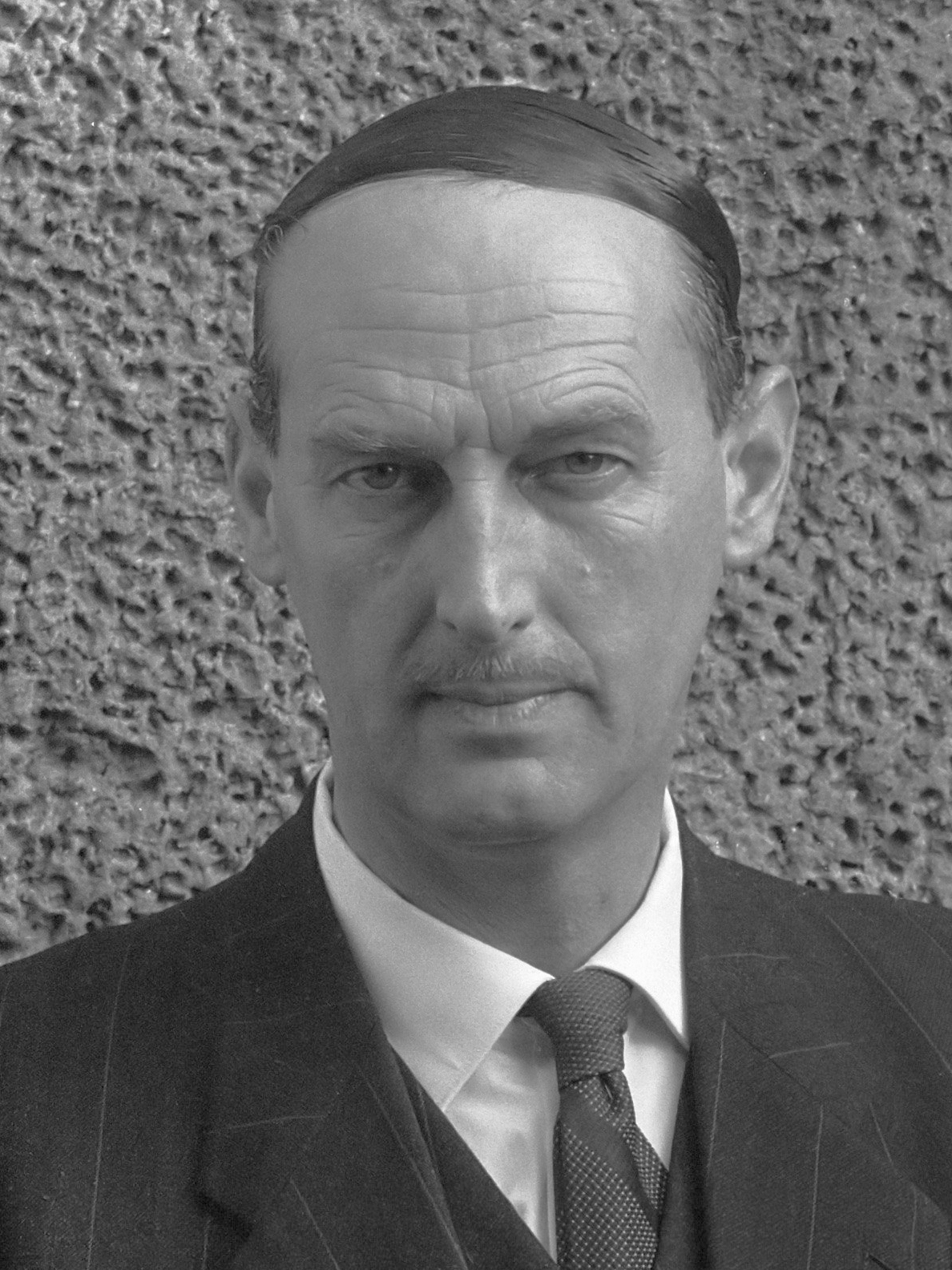
- Hugenholtz in 1961
- Born: 31 October 1914; Vledder, Netherlands
- Died: 25 March 1995 (aged 80); Bentveld, Netherlands
- Known for: Designing racing circuits
- Children: 1

Johannes Bernhardus Theodorus "Hans" Hugenholtz (31 October 1914 – 25 March 1995), known in English-speaking countries as John Hugenholtz, was a Dutch designer of race tracks and cars.

== Personal life ==
Hugenholtz's father, of the same name, was a Protestant minister and peace activist who moved his family to Purmerend in 1918 and Ammerstol in 1924. Hugenholtz studied to be a lawyer and became a journalist by profession, but his interests were in cars. As a young man, he was an amateur motorcycle racer.

Hugenholtz and his wife, Marianne Sophie van Rheineck Leyssius, were involved in a car crash in Zandvoort on January 10, 1995. His wife died immediately, while he succumbed to the injuries two months later at home.

His son, Hans Hugenholtz Jr. (born 1950), is a race car driver.

== As a circuit designer ==
Hugenholtz designed a variety of circuits used for Formula One which have been praised for their challenging nature and innovative features. The latter includes the use of multiple layers of stretching, chainlink fences ("catch fences") to slow down and catch cars running off the track, decreasing the chance of driver injury compared to the customary solid barriers. Such a concept was ultimately perfected for oval tracks (and some road courses) in the early 2000s in the form of the SAFER barrier.

Amongst others, he designed the circuits Suzuka in Japan (1962), Zolder in Belgium (1963), the Hockenheimring's "Motodrom" stadium section in Germany (1965), Jarama in Spain (1967), Ontario Motor Speedway (together with Portland-based architect Michael Parker) in California (1970), and Nivelles in Belgium (1971). Although often credited with designing the Zandvoort circuit as well, the layout was largely dictated by the existing road layout, with Sammy Davis acting as the principal design consultant.

== Other work ==
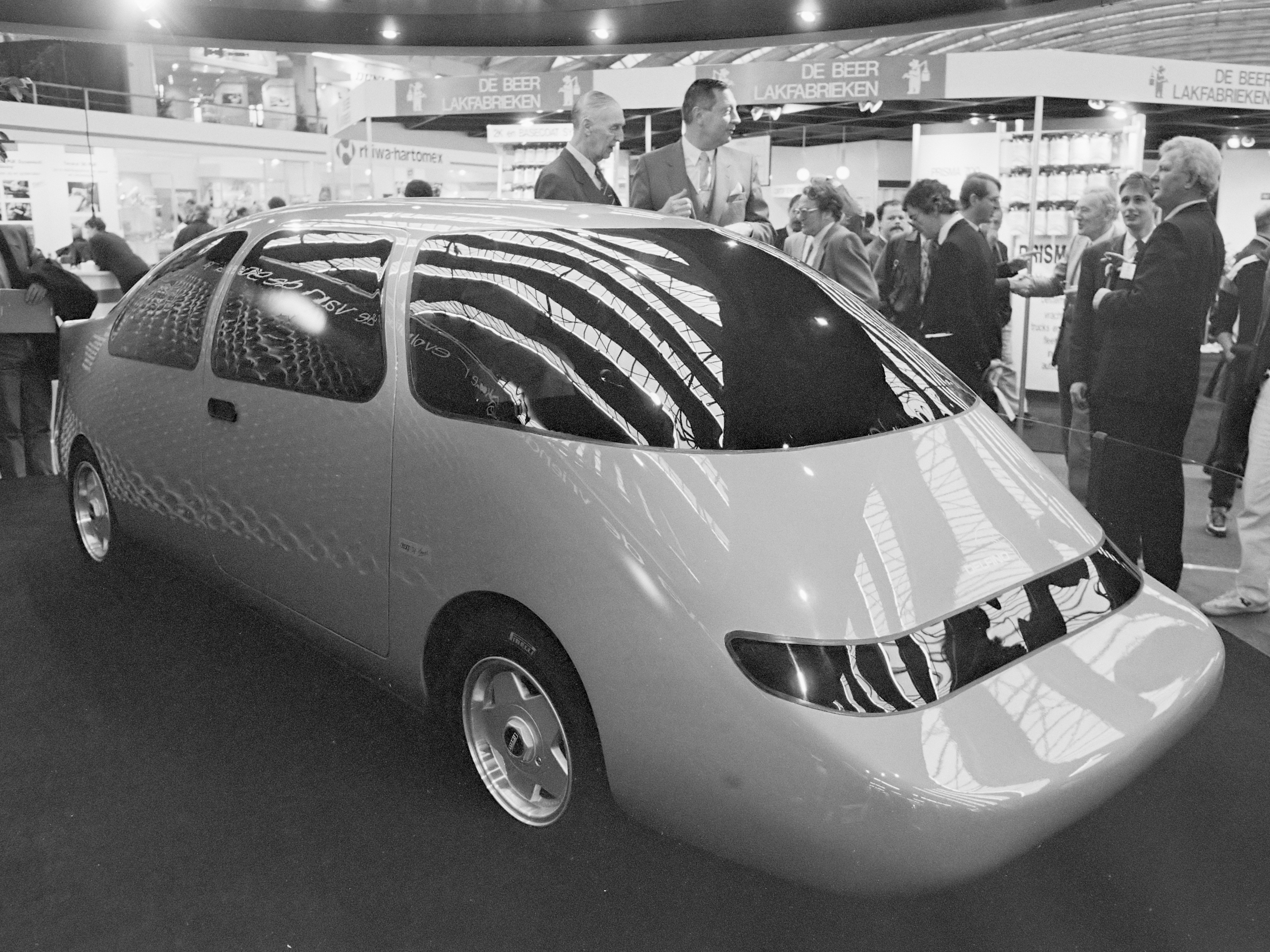
Delfino

Hugenholtz founded the Nederlandse Auto Race Club in 1936 and was director of the Zandvoort racing circuit from 1949 to 1974. He also founded the Association Internationale de Circuits Permanents in Paris, and the Pionier Automobielen Club in 1956, leading to the Fédération Internationale des Voitures Anciennes (FIVA).

He was involved in the stillborn projects of the Dutch Barkey (1948) and Delfino (1989) cars, the latter based on the Alfa Romeo Alfasud chassis and drivetrain.
