= Circuito de Jerez =

Race track in Andalusia, Spain

Circuito de Jerez – Ángel Nieto

- Configuration for FIM sanctioned events

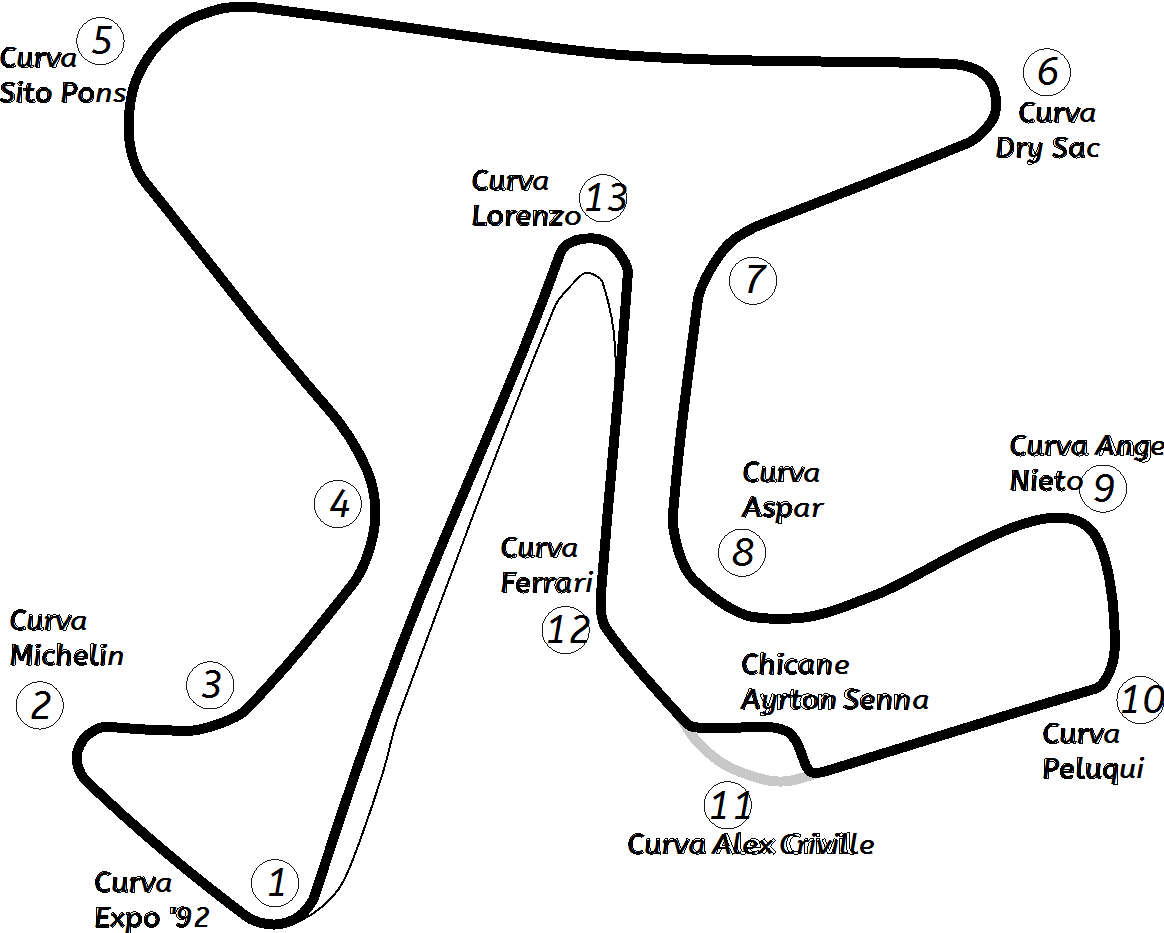
- Configuration for FIA sanctioned events
- Location: Jerez de la Frontera, Andalusia, Spain
- Coordinates: 36°42′30″N 6°2′3″W
- Capacity: 125,000
- FIA Grade: 1
- Broke ground: 1984
- Opened: 8 December 1985; 40 years ago
- Former names: Circuito de Jerez (December 1985–May 2018)
- Major events: Current: Grand Prix motorcycle racing Spanish motorcycle Grand Prix (1987, 1989–present); Expo 92 motorcycle Grand Prix (1988); Andalusian motorcycle Grand Prix (2020); World SBK (1990, 2013–2017, 2019–2021, 2023–2026); Eurocup-3 (2023–2026); Future: Asian Le Mans Series (2027); GB3 Championship (2027); Former: Formula One; Spanish Grand Prix (1986–1990); European Grand Prix (1994, 1997); Lamborghini Super Trofeo World Final (2019, 2024); Ferrari Challenge Europe (2016, 2024); FIM EWC (1986–1987); FIA F2 (2017); Superleague Formula (2008); World Sportscar Championship (1986–1988)
- Website: http://www.circuitodejerez.com/

Grand Prix Circuit (1994–present)
- Length: 4.428 km (2.751 mi)
- Turns: 15
- Race lap record: 1:23.135 ( (Germany) Heinz-Harald Frentzen, Williams FW19, 1997, F1)

Motorcycle Circuit (1992–present) & Grand Prix Circuit (1992–1993)
- Length: 4.423 km (2.748 mi)
- Turns: 13
- Race lap record: 1:37.081 ( (Spain) Álex Márquez, Ducati Desmosedici GP26, 2026, MotoGP)

Grand Prix Circuit (1985–1991)
- Length: 4.218 km (2.621 mi)
- Turns: 16
- Race lap record: 1:24.513 ( (Italy) Riccardo Patrese, Williams FW13B, 1990, F1)

Circuito de Jerez – Ángel Nieto (formerly known as Circuito de Jerez and Circuito de Velocidad Jerez) is a 4.428 km (2.751 mi) racing circuit located close to the city of Jerez de la Frontera, 90 km (56 mi) south of Seville and deep within the sherry-producing region in the south of Spain. The project was led by the Spanish engineer Manuel Medina Lara, based on a preliminary idea from Alessandro Rocci.

== Circuit history ==
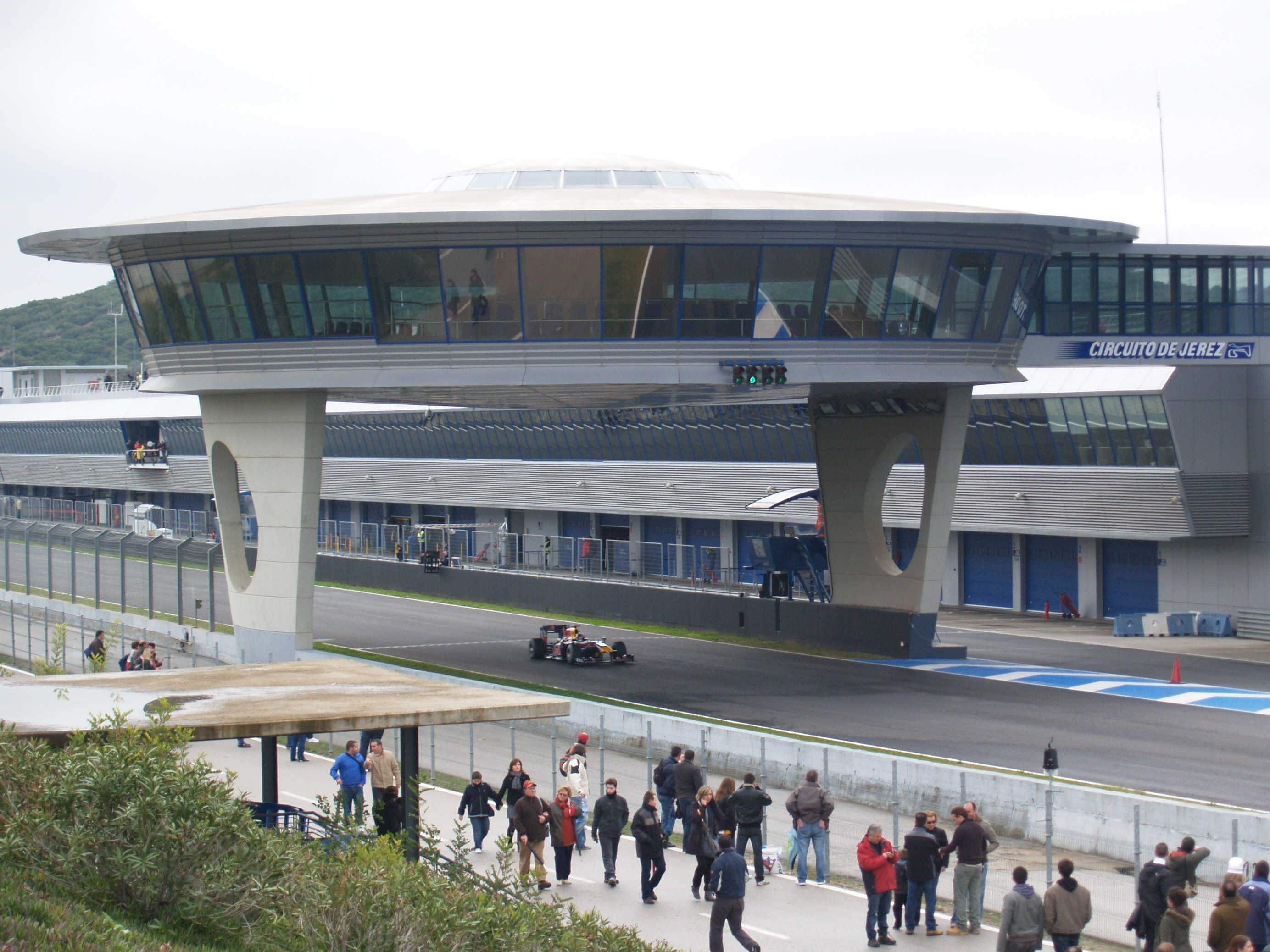
Sebastian Vettel at the 2010 testing sessions, with Red Bull RB6.

The circuit opened on 8 December 1985. During 1986 the circuit hosted the first international motorcycle event in Spain in March and the Formula One Spanish Grand Prix in April. The circuit's relatively remote location hindered significant spectator turnout, although up to 125,000 can be accommodated. Because of this, F1 moved to Barcelona following the 1990 race.

In 1992, the track eliminated four corners to create the long right hander Curva Sito Pons. Due to the hosting of the European Grand Prix in 1994, a new chicane was created (the Senna curve) at the corner where Martin Donnelly had a career-ending accident during qualifying for the 1990 Spanish Grand Prix. Jerez also hosted the 1997 European Grand Prix, which was the championship decider between Michael Schumacher and Jacques Villeneuve, who collided during the race.

During the podium celebrations of the 1997 race, Jerez's Mayor Pedro Pacheco disrupted the podium celebrations by presenting a trophy that was supposed to be presented by a dignitary from Daimler-Benz. This incident resulted in the track being banned from hosting a Grand Prix ever. It has not hosted another Grand Prix since, but continued to be used for winter testing until 2015.

During 2005, the track was resurfaced. It was expected that the Champ Car World Series would race there in 2008 until the series was cancelled early in the year after merging with the IndyCar Series.

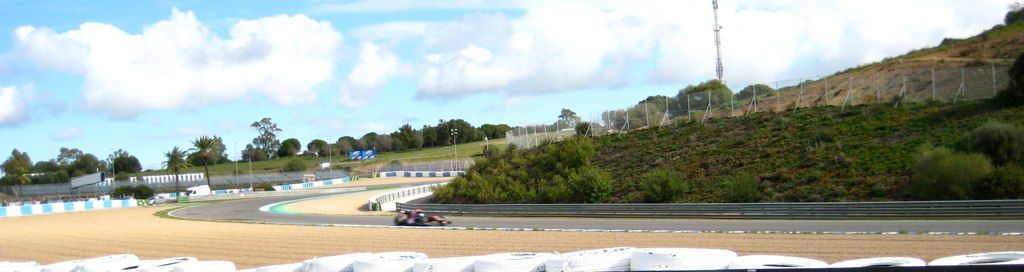
The track during 2010 F1 pre-season testing

On 2 May 2013, it was announced that the final corner would be renamed after Spanish then four-time and reigning world champion (250cc - 2006, 2007; MotoGP - 2010, 2012) Jorge Lorenzo.

In 2017, FIA Formula 2 hosted a stand-alone event on October 7 and 8 at the circuit.

On 3 May 2018, the circuit was renamed in honor of the former motorcyclist Ángel Nieto, who died in 2017.

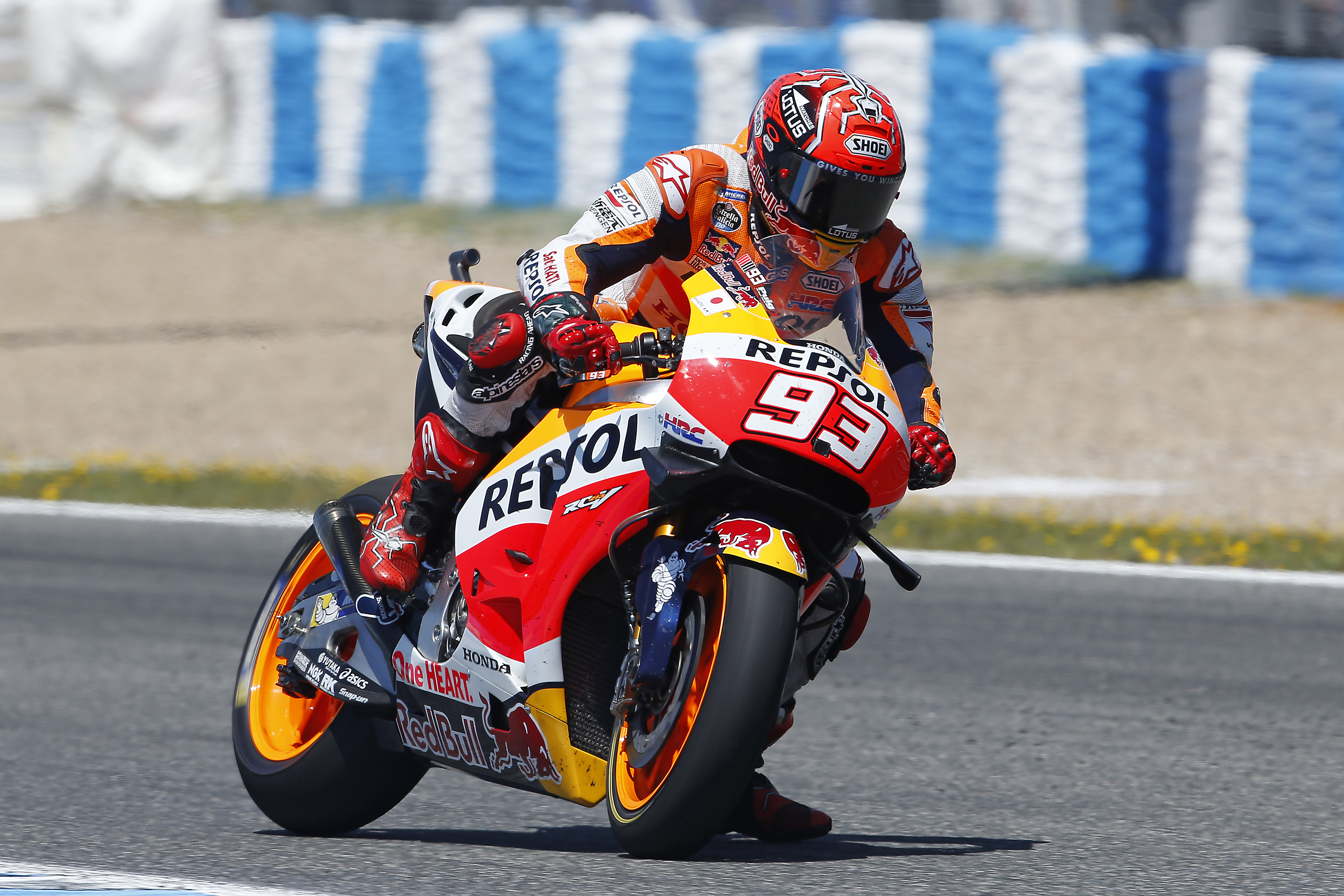
Marc Márquez at the 2016 Spanish motorcycle Grand Prix

On 3 May 2019, the sixth corner (formerly Curva Dry Sac) was renamed after Dani Pedrosa, retired three-time world champion (125cc - 2003; 250cc - 2004, 2005) and three-time runner-up in the MotoGP class.

== Layout history ==
Circuito de Jerez – Ángel Nieto Layout History
Original Grand Prix Circuit (1985–1991)

Motorcycling Circuit (1992–present)

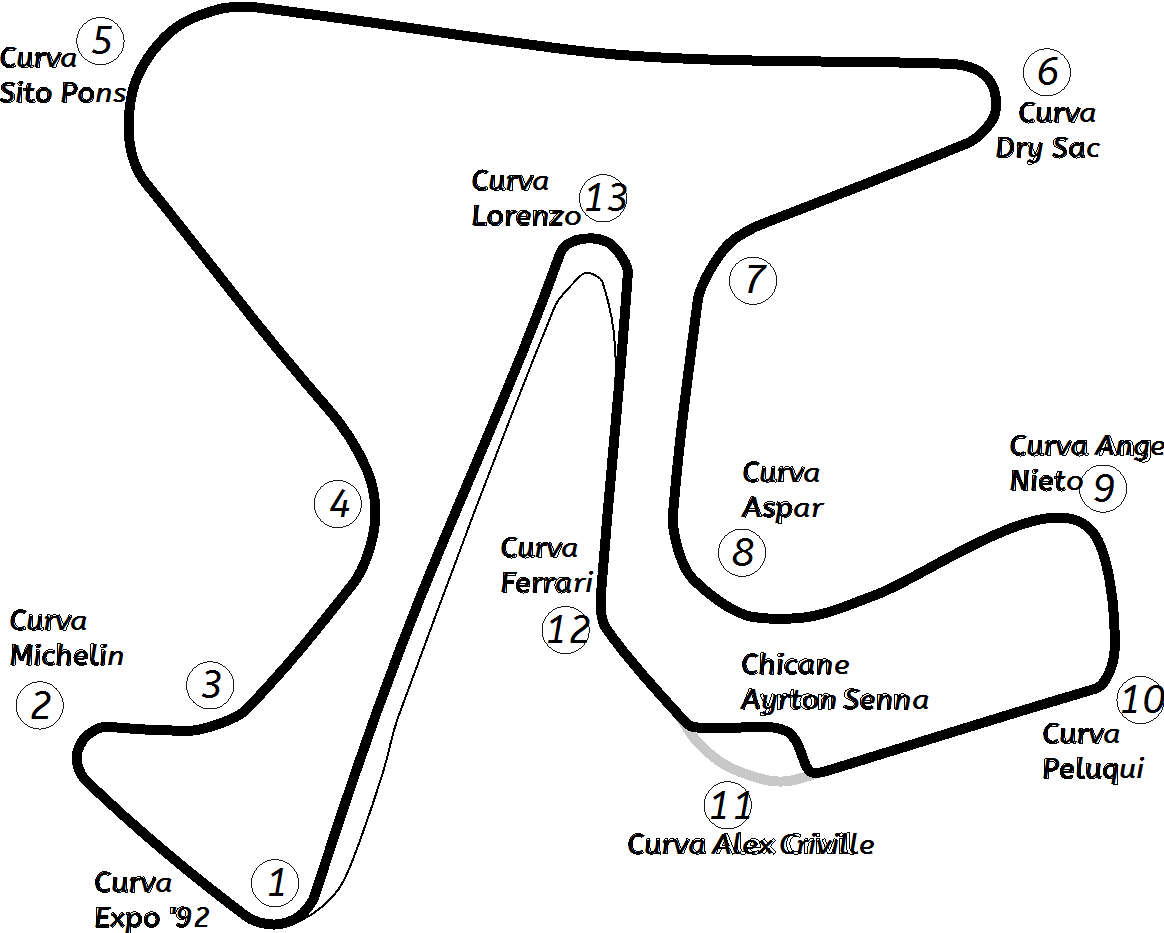
Grand Prix Circuit (1994–present)

== Events ==
Current

- March: Campeonato de España de Superbike
- April: Grand Prix motorcycle racing Spanish motorcycle Grand Prix, Red Bull MotoGP Rookies Cup
- July: FIM Moto3 Junior World Championship, FIM Moto2 European Championship, Moto4 European Cup
- September: Eurocup-3, F4 Spanish Championship, GR Cup Spain
- October: Superbike World Championship, Supersport World Championship, Sportbike World Championship, FIM Women's Circuit Racing World Championship
- November: Supercars Endurance Series Jerez Iberian Racing Festival, Campeonato Portugal de Velocidade, Campeonato de España de Superbike

Future

- Asian Le Mans Cup (2027)
- Asian Le Mans Series
  - 4 Hours of Jerez (2027)
- Formula Winter Series (2023–2024, 2027)
- GB3 Championship (2027)
- GB3 Championship Copa del Sol Series (2027)
- GT Winter Series (2022–2024, 2027)
- GT4 Winter Series (2024, 2027)

Former

- BPR Global GT Series
  - BPR 4 Hours of Jerez (1995)
- Eurocup-3 Spanish Winter Championship (2025)
- Eurocup-4 Spanish Winter Championship (2025)
- Eurocup Clio (2014)
- Eurocup Formula Renault 2.0 (2014–2015)
- Euroformula Open Championship (2013–2018)
- Euroseries 3000 (2002–2004, 2008)
- Ferrari Challenge Europe (2016, 2024)
- FIA Formula 2 Championship (2017)
- FIM Endurance World Championship (1986–1987)
- FIM Intercontinental Games (2024)
- Formula One
  - European Grand Prix (1994, 1997)
  - Spanish Grand Prix (1986–1990)
- Formula Renault 2.0 Alps (2014–2015)
- French F4 Championship (2014, 2018)
- GP3 Series (2017)
- Grand Prix motorcycle racing
  - Andalusian motorcycle Grand Prix (2020)
  - Expo 92 motorcycle Grand Prix (1988)
- International Formula 3000 (1988–1991, 1997)
- International GT Open (2013–2014)
- Lamborghini Super Trofeo World Final (2019, 2024)
- MotoE World Cup
  - Spanish eRace (2020–2022)
- Renault Sport Trophy (2015)
- Sidecar World Championship (1987–1988, 1990–1992)
- Superleague Formula
  - Superleague Formula round Spain (2008)
- Supersport 300 World Championship (2017, 2019–2021, 2024–2025)
- TCR Europe Touring Car Series (2016)
- TCR Spain Touring Car Championship (2022–2025)
- World Series Formula V8 3.5 (1998–1999, 2004, 2014–2017)
- World Sportscar Championship
  - 800 km of Jerez (1986–1988)

== Lap records ==
The all-time outright track record is 1:15.651, set by Pedro de la Rosa in a McLaren MP4-20, during Formula One testing in April 2005. As of October 2026, the fastest official race lap records at the Circuito de Jerez are listed as:

Category	Time	Driver	Vehicle	Event
Grand Prix Circuit (1994–present): 4.428 km (2.751 mi)
Formula One	1:23.135	Heinz-Harald Frentzen	Williams FW19	1997 European Grand Prix
Formula 2	1:29.296	Nyck de Vries	Dallara GP2/11	2017 Jerez Formula 2 round
Formula Renault 3.5	1:30.014	Pietro Fittipaldi	Dallara T12	2017 Jerez Formula V8 round
Superleague Formula	1:30.029	Davide Rigon	Panoz DP09	2008 Jerez Superleague Formula round
GP3	1:32.279	George Russell	Dallara GP3/16	2017 Jerez GP3 round
F3000	1:34.669	Adam Khan	Lola B02/50	2008 Jerez Euroseries 3000 round
Formula Three	1:35.056	Marcel Costa	Dallara F300	2002 1st Jerez Spanish F3 round
Formula Nissan	1:35.365	Enrique Bernoldi	Dallara SN01	2004 Jerez World Series by Nissan round
Eurocup-3	1:35.728	Keanu Al Azhari	Dallara 326	2026 Jerez Eurocup-3 round
Euroformula Open	1:36.988	Harrison Scott	Dallara F312	2017 Jerez Euroformula Open round
Formula Regional	1:37.979	Kacper Sztuka	Tatuus F3 T-318-EC3	2025 Jerez E3 Spanish Winter Championship round
GT3	1:40.714	Colin Caresani	Mercedes-AMG GT3 Evo	2023 Jerez GT Winter Series round
Formula Renault 2.0	1:41.859	Nyck de Vries	Tatuus FR2.0/13	2014 Jerez Eurocup Formula Renault 2.0 round
Lamborghini Super Trofeo	1:42.555	Gerard van der Horst	Lamborghini Huracán Super Trofeo Evo	2019 Lamborghini Super Trofeo World Final
Formula 4	1:43.226	Dilano van 't Hoff	Tatuus F4-T014	2021 Jerez F4 Spain round
Ferrari Challenge	1:43.697	Giacomo Altoè	Ferrari 296 Challenge	2024 Jerez Ferrari Challenge Europe round
GT2	1:44.326	Miguel Ramos	Ferrari 458 Italia GT	2011 Jerez Spanish GT round
Porsche Carrera Cup	1:46.556	Hubert Darmetko	Porsche 911 (992 I) GT3 Cup	2024 Jerez GT Winter Series round
Renault Sport Trophy	1:48.311	Richard Gonda	Renault Sport R.S. 01	2015 Jerez Renault Sport Trophy round
GT1	1:49.680	John Nielsen	McLaren F1 GTR	1995 BPR 4 Hours of Jerez
GT4	1:50.692	Jamie Day	Aston Martin Vantage GT4	2024 Jerez GT4 Winter Series round
Formula Renault 1.6	1:51.054	Joey Mawson	Signatech FR 1.6	2014 Jerez French F4 round
TCR Touring Car	1:52.223	Mike Halder	Honda Civic Type R TCR (FL5)	2025 Jerez TCR Spain round
Renault Clio Cup	2:01.873	Alex Royo	Renault Clio R.S. IV	2017 Jerez Renault Clio Cup Spain round
Toyota GR Cup	2:04.807	Luis Álvarez	Toyota GR86	2026 Jerez Toyota GR Cup Spain round
Motorcycling Circuit (1992–present): 4.423 km (2.748 mi)
MotoGP	1:37.081	Álex Márquez	Ducati Desmosedici GP26	2026 Spanish motorcycle Grand Prix
World SBK	1:37.196	Nicolò Bulega	Ducati Panigale V4 R	2026 Jerez World SBK round
Moto2	1:39.642	Senna Agius	Kalex Moto2	2025 Spanish motorcycle Grand Prix
World SSP	1:41.875	Nicolò Bulega	Ducati Panigale V2	2023 Jerez World SSP round
250cc	1:43.338	Álvaro Bautista	Aprilia RSV 250	2009 Spanish motorcycle Grand Prix
500cc	1:43.779	Valentino Rossi	Honda NSR500	2001 Spanish motorcycle Grand Prix
Moto3	1:44.352	José Antonio Rueda	KTM RC250GP	2025 Spanish motorcycle Grand Prix
World SPB	1:46.716	Carter Thompson	Yamaha YZF-R7	2026 Jerez World SPB round
125cc	1:47.075	Julián Simón	Aprilia RS125R	2009 Spanish motorcycle Grand Prix
MotoE	1:47.473	Eric Granado	Energica Ego Corsa	2021 Spanish motorcycle Grand Prix
World WCR	1:50.998	Paola Ramos	Yamaha YZF-R7	2026 Jerez World WCR round
Supersport 300	1:51.713	Gonzalo Sanchez	Yamaha YZF-R3	2024 Jerez Supersport 300 round
Original Grand Prix Circuit (1985–1991): 4.218 km (2.621 mi)
Formula One	1:24.513	Riccardo Patrese	Williams FW13B	1990 Spanish Grand Prix
F3000	1:34.780	Éric Bernard	Lola T89/50	1989 Jerez F3000 round
Group C	1:38.090	Oscar Larrauri	Porsche 962C	1986 360 km of Jerez
500cc	1:47.615	Wayne Rainey	Yamaha YZR500	1991 Spanish motorcycle Grand Prix
250cc	1:50.002	Helmut Bradl	Honda NSR250	1991 Spanish motorcycle Grand Prix
World SBK	1:51.850	Raymond Roche	Ducati 888 SBK	1990 Jerez World SBK round
Sidecar (B2A)	1:52.237	Steve Webster	Krauser sidecar	1991 Spanish motorcycle Grand Prix
125cc	1:54.038	Ezio Gianola	Derbi 125	1991 Spanish motorcycle Grand Prix
80cc	2:03.410	Stefan Dörflinger	Krauser 80	1988 Expo 92 motorcycle Grand Prix

== Weather and climate ==
Jerez racetrack is located near the airport where the city's official weather station is located. The site has a hot-summer Mediterranean climate (Köppen Csa with mild and rainy winters coupled with hot summers with pronounced drought. As a result, all of Jerez' Formula One and MotoGP races have been held during shoulder seasons when the air temperatures normally are gentler. The current placement of the MotoGP event in early May has reduced rainfall risk compared to the previous April date, as well as raising the likely average temperature by several degrees. Formula One races used to be held in latter parts of the autumn, but were discontinued after 1997.

Jerez used to be a primary winter testing venue for Formula One and remains so for both MotoGP and the Superbike World Championship, in part due to the favourable temperatures in winter mimicking potential conditions during the race season farther north in Europe even in January.

Climate data for Jerez de la Frontera (Jerez Airport) (1981–2010), Extremes (1921–)
Month	Jan	Feb	Mar	Apr	May	Jun	Jul	Aug	Sep	Oct	Nov	Dec	Year
Record high °C (°F)	25.3 (77.5)	29.0 (84.2)	30.6 (87.1)	33.6 (92.5)	38.2 (100.8)	42.0 (107.6)	44.7 (112.5)	45.1 (113.2)	44.6 (112.3)	36.5 (97.7)	30.8 (87.4)	26.8 (80.2)	45.1 (113.2)
Mean daily maximum °C (°F)	16.2 (61.2)	17.8 (64.0)	20.8 (69.4)	22.2 (72.0)	25.5 (77.9)	29.9 (85.8)	33.6 (92.5)	33.5 (92.3)	30.4 (86.7)	25.5 (77.9)	20.2 (68.4)	16.9 (62.4)	24.4 (75.9)
Daily mean °C (°F)	10.7 (51.3)	12.1 (53.8)	14.6 (58.3)	16.0 (60.8)	19.0 (66.2)	22.9 (73.2)	25.9 (78.6)	26.1 (79.0)	23.7 (74.7)	19.6 (67.3)	14.9 (58.8)	12.0 (53.6)	18.2 (64.8)
Mean daily minimum °C (°F)	5.2 (41.4)	6.4 (43.5)	8.3 (46.9)	9.8 (49.6)	12.5 (54.5)	15.9 (60.6)	18.1 (64.6)	18.7 (65.7)	17.0 (62.6)	13.7 (56.7)	9.5 (49.1)	7.1 (44.8)	11.9 (53.4)
Record low °C (°F)	−5.4 (22.3)	−5 (23)	−2.4 (27.7)	−2 (28)	5.0 (41.0)	7.0 (44.6)	9.8 (49.6)	10.5 (50.9)	7.0 (44.6)	2.8 (37.0)	−1 (30)	−5.4 (22.3)	−5.4 (22.3)
Average precipitation mm (inches)	78 (3.1)	56 (2.2)	37 (1.5)	49 (1.9)	30 (1.2)	9 (0.4)	1 (0.0)	2 (0.1)	27 (1.1)	72 (2.8)	96 (3.8)	109 (4.3)	570 (22.4)
Average precipitation days (≥ 1 mm)	6	6	5	6	4	1	0	0	2	6	7	8	53
Average relative humidity (%)	77	73	67	64	60	56	52	55	61	69	75	79	66
Mean monthly sunshine hours	184	187	224	251	300	318	354	334	250	225	184	158	2,965
Source: Agencia Estatal de Meteorología

== Fatalities ==
- Dean Berta Viñales, 15, Spanish motorcycle racer, crashed 25 September 2021.
- Ismael Bonilla, 41, Spanish motorcycle racer, crashed 5 July 2020.
- Marcos Garrido, 14, Spanish motorcycle racer, crashed March 2019.
- Nobuyuki Wakai, 25, Japanese motorcycle racer, crashed 1 May 1993.
- Javier Moreno, 21, Spanish motorcycle racer, crashed 1990.
