= 1987 1000 km of Spa =

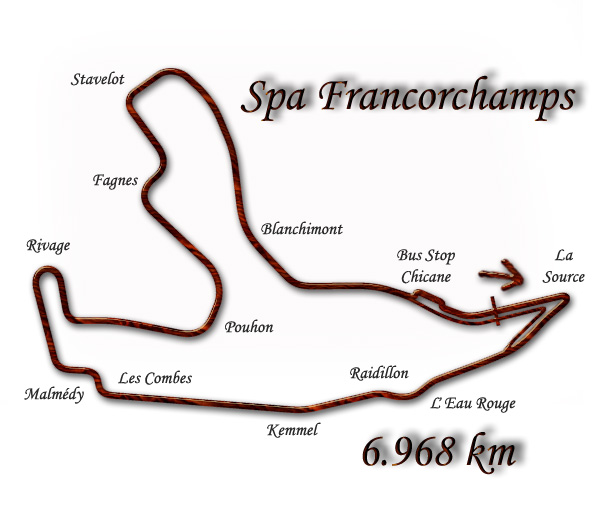
Layout of the Circuit de Spa-Francorchamps (1981–1993, 1995–2003)

The 1987 Kouros 1000 km Spa was the ninth round of the 1987 World Sports-Prototype Championship. It took place at the Circuit de Spa-Francorchamps, Belgium on September 13, 1987.

== Official results ==
Class winners in bold. Cars failing to complete 75% of the winner's distance marked as Not Classified (NC).

Pos	Class	No	Team	Drivers	Chassis	Tyre	Laps
Pos	Class	No	Team	Drivers	Engine	Tyre	Laps
1	**C1**	**6**	**(United Kingdom) Silk Cut Jaguar**	**(United Kingdom) Martin Brundle (United Kingdom) Johnny Dumfries (Brazil) Raul Boesel**	**Jaguar XJR-8**	**D**	**142**
1	**C1**	**6**	**(United Kingdom) Silk Cut Jaguar**	**(United Kingdom) Martin Brundle (United Kingdom) Johnny Dumfries (Brazil) Raul Boesel**	**Jaguar 7.0L V12**	**D**	**142**
2	C1	5	(United Kingdom) Silk Cut Jaguar	(Netherlands) Jan Lammers (United Kingdom) John Watson	Jaguar XJR-8	**D**	141
2	C1	5	(United Kingdom) Silk Cut Jaguar	(Netherlands) Jan Lammers (United Kingdom) John Watson	Jaguar 7.0L V12	**D**	141
3	C1	2	(Switzerland) Brun Motorsport	(Germany) Jochen Mass (Argentina) Oscar Larrauri	Porsche 962C	**MI**	140
3	C1	2	(Switzerland) Brun Motorsport	(Germany) Jochen Mass (Argentina) Oscar Larrauri	Porsche Type-935 3.0L Turbo Flat-6	**MI**	140
4	C1	4	(United Kingdom) Silk Cut Jaguar	(Denmark) John Nielsen (United States) Eddie Cheever	Jaguar XJR-8	**D**	140
4	C1	4	(United Kingdom) Silk Cut Jaguar	(Denmark) John Nielsen (United States) Eddie Cheever	Jaguar 7.0L V12	**D**	140
5	C1	7	(Germany) Joest Racing	(Germany) Hans-Joachim Stuck (United Kingdom) Derek Bell (France) Bob Wollek	Porsche 962C	**G**	139
5	C1	7	(Germany) Joest Racing	(Germany) Hans-Joachim Stuck (United Kingdom) Derek Bell (France) Bob Wollek	Porsche Type-935 3.0L Turbo Flat-6	**G**	139
6	C1	8	(Germany) Joest Racing	(Germany) Frank Jelinski (Germany) "John Winter" (Sweden) Stanley Dickens	Porsche 962C	**G**	138
6	C1	8	(Germany) Joest Racing	(Germany) Frank Jelinski (Germany) "John Winter" (Sweden) Stanley Dickens	Porsche Type-935 2.8L Turbo Flat-6	**G**	138
7	C1	61	(Switzerland) Kouros Racing Team	(New Zealand) Mike Thackwell (France) Jean-Louis Schlesser	Sauber C9	**MI**	136
7	C1	61	(Switzerland) Kouros Racing Team	(New Zealand) Mike Thackwell (France) Jean-Louis Schlesser	Mercedes-Benz M117 5.0L Turbo V8	**MI**	136
8	C1	3	(Switzerland) Brun Motorsport	(Germany) Uwe Schäfer (Spain) Jesús Pareja	Porsche 962C	**MI**	136
8	C1	3	(Switzerland) Brun Motorsport	(Germany) Uwe Schäfer (Spain) Jesús Pareja	Porsche Type-935 2.8L Turbo Flat-6	**MI**	136
9	C1	72	(France) Primagaz Competition	(France) Pierre Yver (Germany) Jürgen Lässig (Belgium) Bernard de Dryver	Porsche 962C	**G**	135
9	C1	72	(France) Primagaz Competition	(France) Pierre Yver (Germany) Jürgen Lässig (Belgium) Bernard de Dryver	Porsche Type-935 2.8L Turbo Flat-6	**G**	135
10	**C2**	**111**	**(United Kingdom) Spice Engineering**	**(Spain) Fermín Vélez (United Kingdom) Gordon Spice**	**Spice SE86C**	**A**	**135**
10	**C2**	**111**	**(United Kingdom) Spice Engineering**	**(Spain) Fermín Vélez (United Kingdom) Gordon Spice**	**Ford Cosworth DFL 3.3L V8**	**A**	**135**
11	C1	1	(Switzerland) Brun Motorsport	(Switzerland) Walter Brun (Italy) Massimo Sigala	Porsche 962C	**MI**	134
11	C1	1	(Switzerland) Brun Motorsport	(Switzerland) Walter Brun (Italy) Massimo Sigala	Porsche Type-935 2.8L Turbo Flat-6	**MI**	134
12	C2	101	(United Kingdom) Ecurie Ecosse	(Belgium) Marc Duez (United Kingdom) Mike Wilds	Ecosse C286	**A**	129
12	C2	101	(United Kingdom) Ecurie Ecosse	(Belgium) Marc Duez (United Kingdom) Mike Wilds	Ford Cosworth DFL 3.3L V8	**A**	129
13	C2	102	(United Kingdom) Ecurie Ecosse	(United Kingdom) Ray Mallock (United Kingdom) David Leslie	Ecosse C286	**A**	128
13	C2	102	(United Kingdom) Ecurie Ecosse	(United Kingdom) Ray Mallock (United Kingdom) David Leslie	Ford Cosworth DFL 3.3L V8	**A**	128
14	C2	117	(Norway) Team Lucky Strike Schanche	(United Kingdom) Will Hoy (Norway) Martin Schanche	Argo JM19B	**A**	127
14	C2	117	(Norway) Team Lucky Strike Schanche	(United Kingdom) Will Hoy (Norway) Martin Schanche	Zakspeed 1.9L Turbo I4	**A**	127
15	C2	118	(United Kingdom) Olindo Iacobelli (United Kingdom) Chamberlain Engineering	(France) Gerard Cardinaud (France) Jean-Louis Ricci (France) Georges Tessier	Spice SE86C	**A**	123
15	C2	118	(United Kingdom) Olindo Iacobelli (United Kingdom) Chamberlain Engineering	(France) Gerard Cardinaud (France) Jean-Louis Ricci (France) Georges Tessier	Ford DFL 3.3L V8	**A**	123
16	C2	106	(Italy) Kelmar Racing	(Italy) Vito Veninata (Italy) Pasquale Barberio	Tiga GC85	**A**	116
16	C2	106	(Italy) Kelmar Racing	(Italy) Vito Veninata (Italy) Pasquale Barberio	Ford Cosworth DFL 3.3L V8	**A**	116
17	C2	188	(United Kingdom) Ark Racing Ceekar	(United Kingdom) Lawrie Hickman (United Kingdom) Max Payne (United Kingdom) Chris Ashmore	Ceekar 83J	?	115
17	C2	188	(United Kingdom) Ark Racing Ceekar	(United Kingdom) Lawrie Hickman (United Kingdom) Max Payne (United Kingdom) Chris Ashmore	Ford Cosworth DFV 3.0L V8	?	115
18	C2	177	(France) Automobiles Louis Descartes	(France) Gérard Tremblay (France) Dominique Lacaud (France) Jacques Heuclin	ALD 03	**A**	115
18	C2	177	(France) Automobiles Louis Descartes	(France) Gérard Tremblay (France) Dominique Lacaud (France) Jacques Heuclin	BMW M88 3.5L V8	**A**	115
19	C2	178	(France) Automobiles Louis Descartes	(France) Gérard Tremblay (France) Thierry Lecerf (France) Bruno Sotty	ALD 02	**A**	105
19	C2	178	(France) Automobiles Louis Descartes	(France) Gérard Tremblay (France) Thierry Lecerf (France) Bruno Sotty	BMW M88 3.5L V8	**A**	105
20	C2	127	(United Kingdom) Chamberlain Engineering	(United Kingdom) Nick Adams (United Kingdom) Ian Khan	Spice SE86C	**A**	104
20	C2	127	(United Kingdom) Chamberlain Engineering	(United Kingdom) Nick Adams (United Kingdom) Ian Khan	Hart 418T 1.8L Turbo I4	**A**	104
21	C2	123	(United Kingdom) Charles Ivey Racing	(United Kingdom) John Sheldon (France) Philippe de Henning	Tiga GC287	**A**	99
21	C2	123	(United Kingdom) Charles Ivey Racing	(United Kingdom) John Sheldon (France) Philippe de Henning	Porsche Type-935 2.6L Turbo Flat-6	**A**	99
22 NC	C1	20	(United Kingdom) Tiga Team	(United Kingdom) Tim Lee-Davey (United Kingdom) Val Musetti	Tiga GC87	**D**	89
22 NC	C1	20	(United Kingdom) Tiga Team	(United Kingdom) Tim Lee-Davey (United Kingdom) Val Musetti	Ford Cosworth DFL 3.3L Turbo V8	**D**	89
23 DNF	C1	15	(United Kingdom) Britten – Lloyd Racing	(Italy) Mauro Baldi (United Kingdom) Jonathan Palmer	Porsche 962C GTi	**G**	103
23 DNF	C1	15	(United Kingdom) Britten – Lloyd Racing	(Italy) Mauro Baldi (United Kingdom) Jonathan Palmer	Porsche Type-935 2.8L Turbo Flat-6	**G**	103
24 DNF	C2	181	(United Kingdom) Dune Motorsports	(Australia) Neil Crang (United Kingdom) Duncan Bain	Tiga GC287	**A**	80
24 DNF	C2	181	(United Kingdom) Dune Motorsports	(Australia) Neil Crang (United Kingdom) Duncan Bain	Rover V64V 3.0L V6	**A**	80
25 DNF	C1	10	(Germany) Porsche Kremer Racing	(Germany) Volker Weidler (Denmark) Kris Nissen	Porsche 962C	**Y**	78
25 DNF	C1	10	(Germany) Porsche Kremer Racing	(Germany) Volker Weidler (Denmark) Kris Nissen	Porsche Type-935 2.8L Turbo Flat-6	**Y**	78
26 DNF	C2	103	(United Kingdom) John Bartlett Racing	(United Kingdom) John Bartlett (United Kingdom) Tom Waring (Italy) Giovanni Lavaggi	Bardon DB1/2	?	77
26 DNF	C2	103	(United Kingdom) John Bartlett Racing	(United Kingdom) John Bartlett (United Kingdom) Tom Waring (Italy) Giovanni Lavaggi	Ford Cosworth DFL 3.3L V8	?	77
27 DNF	C2	171	(Sweden) CEE Sport	(United Kingdom) Laurence Jacobsen (United Kingdom) Richard Jones (Italy) Stefano Sebastiani	Tiga GC286	**A**	74
27 DNF	C2	171	(Sweden) CEE Sport	(United Kingdom) Laurence Jacobsen (United Kingdom) Richard Jones (Italy) Stefano Sebastiani	Ford Cosworth BDT-E 2.3L Turbo I4	**A**	74
28 DNF	C2	198	(United Kingdom) Roy Baker Promotion	(United Kingdom) David Andrews (United Kingdom) Mike Kimpton	Tiga GC286	**A**	54
28 DNF	C2	198	(United Kingdom) Roy Baker Promotion	(United Kingdom) David Andrews (United Kingdom) Mike Kimpton	Ford Cosworth DFL 3.3L V8	**A**	54
29 DNF	C2	114	Team Tiga Ford Denmark	(Denmark) Thorkild Thyrring (Denmark) Peter Elgaard	Tiga GC287	**A**	38
29 DNF	C2	114	Team Tiga Ford Denmark	(Denmark) Thorkild Thyrring (Denmark) Peter Elgaard	Ford Cosworth BDT-E 2.3L Turbo I4	**A**	38
30 DNF	C2	121	(United Kingdom) Cosmic GP Motorsport	(Greece) Costas Los (United Kingdom) Dudley Wood	Tiga GC287	**G**	38
30 DNF	C2	121	(United Kingdom) Cosmic GP Motorsport	(Greece) Costas Los (United Kingdom) Dudley Wood	Ford Cosworth DFL 3.3L V8	**G**	38
31 DNF	C2	140	(United Kingdom) Gebhardt Motorsport	(Germany) Günther Gebhardt (Austria) Walter Lechner (Austria) Ernst Franzmaier	Gebhardt JC873	?	19
31 DNF	C2	140	(United Kingdom) Gebhardt Motorsport	(Germany) Günther Gebhardt (Austria) Walter Lechner (Austria) Ernst Franzmaier	Audi 2.1L Turbo I5	?	19
32 DNF	C2	200	(Belgium) Manfred Dahm Racing Team	(Belgium) Patrick de Radigues (Sweden) Kenneth Leim	Argo JM19	**G**	4
32 DNF	C2	200	(Belgium) Manfred Dahm Racing Team	(Belgium) Patrick de Radigues (Sweden) Kenneth Leim	Porsche Type-930 3.2L Turbo Flat-6	**G**	4

== Statistics ==
- Pole Position - #61 Kouros Racing Team - 2:04.040
- Fastest Lap - #61 Kouros Racing Team - 2:09.300
- Average Speed - 164.337 km/h

World Sportscar Championship
Previous race: 1987 1000km of Nürburgring	1987 season	Next race: 1987 1000km of Fuji
