= 1987 1000 km of Nürburgring =

Sports car endurance race in Germany

Nürburgring (1984–1994)

The 1987 International ADAC 1000 km Rennen was the eighth round of the 1987 World Sports-Prototype Championship. It took place at the Nürburgring, West Germany on August 30, 1987.

== Official results ==
Class winners in bold. Cars failing to complete 75% of the winner's distance marked as Not Classified (NC).

Pos	Class	No	Team	Drivers	Chassis	Tyre	Laps
Pos	Class	No	Team	Drivers	Engine	Tyre	Laps
1	**C1**	**4**	**(United Kingdom) Silk Cut Jaguar**	**(United States) Eddie Cheever (Brazil) Raul Boesel**	**Jaguar XJR-8**	D	**221**
1	**C1**	**4**	**(United Kingdom) Silk Cut Jaguar**	**(United States) Eddie Cheever (Brazil) Raul Boesel**	**Jaguar 7.0L V12**	D	**221**
2	C1	7	(West Germany) Joest Racing	(West Germany) Hans-Joachim Stuck (United Kingdom) Derek Bell	Porsche 962C	G	218
2	C1	7	(West Germany) Joest Racing	(West Germany) Hans-Joachim Stuck (United Kingdom) Derek Bell	Porsche Type-935 3.0L Turbo Flat-6	G	218
3	C1	2	(Switzerland) Brun Motorsport	(West Germany) Jochen Mass (Argentina) Oscar Larrauri	Porsche 962C	MI	216
3	C1	2	(Switzerland) Brun Motorsport	(West Germany) Jochen Mass (Argentina) Oscar Larrauri	Porsche Type-935 3.0L Turbo Flat-6	MI	216
4	C1	8	(West Germany) Joest Racing	(West Germany) Frank Jelinski (West Germany) "John Winter" (Sweden) Stanley Dickens	Porsche 962C	G	212
4	C1	8	(West Germany) Joest Racing	(West Germany) Frank Jelinski (West Germany) "John Winter" (Sweden) Stanley Dickens	Porsche Type-935 2.8L Turbo Flat-6	G	212
5	C1	15	(United Kingdom) Britten – Lloyd Racing	(Italy) Mauro Baldi (United Kingdom) Jonathan Palmer	Porsche 962C GTi	G	211
5	C1	15	(United Kingdom) Britten – Lloyd Racing	(Italy) Mauro Baldi (United Kingdom) Jonathan Palmer	Porsche Type-935 2.8L Turbo Flat-6	G	211
6	C1	3	(Switzerland) Brun Motorsport	(Switzerland) Hans-Peter Kaufmann (Switzerland) Franz Hunkeler (Spain) Jesús Pareja	Porsche 962C	MI	208
6	C1	3	(Switzerland) Brun Motorsport	(Switzerland) Hans-Peter Kaufmann (Switzerland) Franz Hunkeler (Spain) Jesús Pareja	Porsche Type-935 2.8L Turbo Flat-6	MI	208
7	C1	72	(France) Primagaz Competition	(France) Cathy Muller (West Germany) Jürgen Lässig (Belgium) Bernard de Dryver	Porsche 962C	G	208
7	C1	72	(France) Primagaz Competition	(France) Cathy Muller (West Germany) Jürgen Lässig (Belgium) Bernard de Dryver	Porsche Type-935 2.8L Turbo Flat-6	G	208
8	C1	31	(West Germany) Dauer Racing	(West Germany) Jochen Dauer (West Germany) Harald Grohs	Porsche 962C	G	207
8	C1	31	(West Germany) Dauer Racing	(West Germany) Jochen Dauer (West Germany) Harald Grohs	Porsche Type-935 2.8L Turbo Flat-6	G	207
9	**C2**	**121**	**(United Kingdom) Cosmic GP Motorsport**	**(Greece) Costas Los (United Kingdom) Dudley Wood**	**Tiga GC287**	G	**198**
9	**C2**	**121**	**(United Kingdom) Cosmic GP Motorsport**	**(Greece) Costas Los (United Kingdom) Dudley Wood**	**Ford Cosworth DFL 3.3L V8**	G	**198**
10	C2	106	(Italy) Kelmar Racing	(Italy) Vito Veninata (Italy) Ranieri Randaccio (Italy) Pasquale Barberio	Tiga GC85	A	198
10	C2	106	(Italy) Kelmar Racing	(Italy) Vito Veninata (Italy) Ranieri Randaccio (Italy) Pasquale Barberio	Ford Cosworth DFL 3.3L V8	A	198
11	C2	101	(United Kingdom) Ecurie Ecosse	(United Kingdom) Win Percy (United Kingdom) Mike Wilds	Ecosse C286	A	197
11	C2	101	(United Kingdom) Ecurie Ecosse	(United Kingdom) Win Percy (United Kingdom) Mike Wilds	Ford Cosworth DFL 3.3L V8	A	197
12	C1	1	(Switzerland) Brun Motorsport	(Switzerland) Walter Brun (West Germany) Uwe Schäfer	Porsche 962C	MI	191
12	C1	1	(Switzerland) Brun Motorsport	(Switzerland) Walter Brun (West Germany) Uwe Schäfer	Porsche Type-935 2.8L Turbo Flat-6	MI	191
13	C2	104	(West Germany) URD Junior Team	(West Germany) Rudi Seher (West Germany) Hellmut Mundas	URD C81	A	186
13	C2	104	(West Germany) URD Junior Team	(West Germany) Rudi Seher (West Germany) Hellmut Mundas	BMW M88 3.5L I6	A	186
14	C1	10	(West Germany) Porsche Kremer Racing	(West Germany) Volker Weidler (Denmark) Kris Nissen	Porsche 962C	Y	183
14	C1	10	(West Germany) Porsche Kremer Racing	(West Germany) Volker Weidler (Denmark) Kris Nissen	Porsche Type-935 2.8L Turbo Flat-6	Y	183
15	C2	198	(United Kingdom) Roy Baker Promotion	(United Kingdom) David Andrews (United Kingdom) Chris Ashmore (Morocco) Max Cohen-Olivar	Tiga GC286	A	182
15	C2	198	(United Kingdom) Roy Baker Promotion	(United Kingdom) David Andrews (United Kingdom) Chris Ashmore (Morocco) Max Cohen-Olivar	Ford Cosworth DFL 3.3L V8	A	182
16	C2	127	(United Kingdom) Chamberlain Engineering	(United Kingdom) Nick Adams (United Kingdom) Bob Juggins	Spice SE86C	A	170
16	C2	127	(United Kingdom) Chamberlain Engineering	(United Kingdom) Nick Adams (United Kingdom) Bob Juggins	Hart 418T 1.8L Turbo I4	A	170
17 NC	C2	114	Team Tiga Ford Denmark	(Denmark) Thorkild Thyrring (Denmark) Peter Elgaard	Tiga GC287	A	149
17 NC	C2	114	Team Tiga Ford Denmark	(Denmark) Thorkild Thyrring (Denmark) Peter Elgaard	Ford Cosworth BDT-E 2.3L Turbo I4	A	149
18 NC	C2	118	(United Kingdom) Olindo Iacobelli (United Kingdom) Chamberlain Engineering	(United States) Olindo Iacobelli (France) Jean-Louis Ricci (France) Georges Tessier	Spice SE86C	A	141
18 NC	C2	118	(United Kingdom) Olindo Iacobelli (United Kingdom) Chamberlain Engineering	(United States) Olindo Iacobelli (France) Jean-Louis Ricci (France) Georges Tessier	Ford Cosworth DFL 3.3L V8	A	141
19 NC	C2	123	(United Kingdom) Charles Ivey Racing	(United Kingdom) John Sheldon (France) Philippe de Henning	Tiga GC287	A	116
19 NC	C2	123	(United Kingdom) Charles Ivey Racing	(United Kingdom) John Sheldon (France) Philippe de Henning	Porsche Type-935 2.6L Turbo Flat-6	A	116
20 DSQ^{†}	C2	111	(United Kingdom) Spice Engineering	(Spain) Fermín Vélez (United Kingdom) Gordon Spice	Spice SE86C	A	200
20 DSQ^{†}	C2	111	(United Kingdom) Spice Engineering	(Spain) Fermín Vélez (United Kingdom) Gordon Spice	Ford Cosworth DFL 3.3L V8	A	200
21 DNF	C2	102	(United Kingdom) Ecurie Ecosse	(United Kingdom) Ray Mallock (United Kingdom) David Leslie	Ecosse C286	A	194
21 DNF	C2	102	(United Kingdom) Ecurie Ecosse	(United Kingdom) Ray Mallock (United Kingdom) David Leslie	Ford Cosworth DFL 3.3L V8	A	194
22 DNF	C1	61	(Switzerland) Kouros Racing Team	(New Zealand) Mike Thackwell (United Kingdom) Johnny Dumfries (France) Henri Pescarolo	Sauber C9	MI	138
22 DNF	C1	61	(Switzerland) Kouros Racing Team	(New Zealand) Mike Thackwell (United Kingdom) Johnny Dumfries (France) Henri Pescarolo	Mercedes-Benz M117 5.0L Turbo V8	MI	138
23 DNF	C1	42	(France) Noël del Bello	(France) Jean-Pierre Jaussaud (France) Noël del Bello (France) Lucien Rossiaud	Sauber C8	G	137
23 DNF	C1	42	(France) Noël del Bello	(France) Jean-Pierre Jaussaud (France) Noël del Bello (France) Lucien Rossiaud	Mercedes-Benz M117 5.0L Turbo V8	G	137
24 DNF	C1	9	(West Germany) Joest Racing	(West Germany) Klaus Ludwig (France) Bob Wollek	Porsche 962C	G	117
24 DNF	C1	9	(West Germany) Joest Racing	(West Germany) Klaus Ludwig (France) Bob Wollek	Porsche Type-935 2.8L Turbo Flat-6	G	117
25 DNF	C2	117	(Norway) Team Lucky Strike Schanche	(United Kingdom) Will Hoy (Norway) Martin Schanche	Argo JM19B	A	86
25 DNF	C2	117	(Norway) Team Lucky Strike Schanche	(United Kingdom) Will Hoy (Norway) Martin Schanche	Zakspeed 1.9L Turbo I4	A	86
26 DNF	C2	177	(France) Automobiles Louis Descartes	(France) Gérard Tremblay (France) Dominique Lacaud (France) Louis Descartes	ALD 03	A	29
26 DNF	C2	177	(France) Automobiles Louis Descartes	(France) Gérard Tremblay (France) Dominique Lacaud (France) Louis Descartes	BMW M88 3.5L V8	A	29
27 DNF	C1	5	(United Kingdom) Silk Cut Jaguar	(Netherlands) Jan Lammers (United Kingdom) John Watson	Jaguar XJR-8	D	28
27 DNF	C1	5	(United Kingdom) Silk Cut Jaguar	(Netherlands) Jan Lammers (United Kingdom) John Watson	Jaguar 7.0L V12	D	28
28 DNF	C2	200	(Belgium) Dahm Cars Racing Team	(West Germany) Peter Fritsch (West Germany) Deiter Heinzelmann (Sweden) Kenneth Leim	Argo JM19	G	11
28 DNF	C2	200	(Belgium) Dahm Cars Racing Team	(West Germany) Peter Fritsch (West Germany) Deiter Heinzelmann (Sweden) Kenneth Leim	Porsche Type-930 3.2L Turbo Flat-6	G	11
29 DNF	C1	20	(United Kingdom) Tiga Team	(United Kingdom) Tim Lee-Davey (United Kingdom) Evan Clements	Tiga GC87	D	9
29 DNF	C1	20	(United Kingdom) Tiga Team	(United Kingdom) Tim Lee-Davey (United Kingdom) Evan Clements	Ford Cosworth DFL 3.3L Turbo V8	D	9
DNS	C1	62	(Switzerland) Kouros Racing Team	(United Kingdom) Johnny Dumfries (West Germany) Manuel Reuter	Sauber C9	MI	-
DNS	C1	62	(Switzerland) Kouros Racing Team	(United Kingdom) Johnny Dumfries (West Germany) Manuel Reuter	Mercedes-Benz M117 5.0L Turbo V8	MI	-
DNS	C2	178	(France) Automobiles Louis Descartes	(France) Bruno Sotty (France) Gérard Tremblay	ALD 02	A	-
DNS	C2	178	(France) Automobiles Louis Descartes	(France) Bruno Sotty (France) Gérard Tremblay	BMW M88 3.5L V8	A	-
DNS	C2	188	(United Kingdom) Ark Racing	(United Kingdom) Lawrie Hickman (United Kingdom) Max Payne	Ceekar 83J	A	-
DNS	C2	188	(United Kingdom) Ark Racing	(United Kingdom) Lawrie Hickman (United Kingdom) Max Payne	Ford Cosworth DFV 3.0L V8	A	-

† - #111 Spice Engineering was disqualified following the race after it was discovered that the car had received a push start during a pit stop.

== Statistics ==
- Pole Position - #15 Britten – Lloyd Racing - 1:25.430
- Fastest Lap - #9 Joest Racing - 1:29.510
- Average Speed - 182.675 km/h

World Sportscar Championship
Previous race: 1987 1000 km of Brands Hatch	1987 season	Next race: 1987 1000 km of Spa
