= 1987 1000 km of Brands Hatch =

Seventh round of the 1987 World Sports-Prototype Championship

Layout of the Brands Hatch (1976-1987)

The 1987 Shell Gemini 1000 Kilometers Brands Hatch was the seventh round of the 1987 World Sports-Prototype Championship. It took place at Brands Hatch, United Kingdom on 26 July 1987.

== Official results ==
Class winners in bold. Cars failing to complete 75% of the winner's distance marked as Not Classified (NC).

Pos	Class	No	Team	Drivers	Chassis	Tyre	Laps
Pos	Class	No	Team	Drivers	Engine	Tyre	Laps
1	**C1**	**4**	**(United Kingdom) Silk Cut Jaguar**	**(Denmark) John Nielsen (Brazil) Raul Boesel**	**Jaguar XJR-8**	**D**	**238**
1	**C1**	**4**	**(United Kingdom) Silk Cut Jaguar**	**(Denmark) John Nielsen (Brazil) Raul Boesel**	**Jaguar 7.0L V12**	**D**	**238**
2	C1	15	(United Kingdom) Britten – Lloyd Racing	(Italy) Mauro Baldi (United Kingdom) Johnny Dumfries	Porsche 962C GTi	**G**	238
2	C1	15	(United Kingdom) Britten – Lloyd Racing	(Italy) Mauro Baldi (United Kingdom) Johnny Dumfries	Porsche Type-935 2.8L Turbo Flat-6	**G**	238
3	C1	5	(United Kingdom) Silk Cut Jaguar	(Netherlands) Jan Lammers (United Kingdom) John Watson	Jaguar XJR-8	**D**	229
3	C1	5	(United Kingdom) Silk Cut Jaguar	(Netherlands) Jan Lammers (United Kingdom) John Watson	Jaguar 7.0L V12	**D**	229
4	C1	7	(Germany) Joest Racing	(Germany) Hans-Joachim Stuck (United Kingdom) Derek Bell	Porsche 962C	**G**	228
4	C1	7	(Germany) Joest Racing	(Germany) Hans-Joachim Stuck (United Kingdom) Derek Bell	Porsche Type-935 2.8L Turbo Flat-6	**G**	228
5	C1	2	(Switzerland) Brun Motorsport	(Germany) Jochen Mass (Argentina) Oscar Larrauri	Porsche 962C	**M**	228
5	C1	2	(Switzerland) Brun Motorsport	(Germany) Jochen Mass (Argentina) Oscar Larrauri	Porsche Type-935 2.8L Turbo Flat-6	**M**	228
6	C1	10	(Germany) Porsche Kremer Racing	(Germany) Volker Weidler (Denmark) Kris Nissen	Porsche 962C	**Y**	225
6	C1	10	(Germany) Porsche Kremer Racing	(Germany) Volker Weidler (Denmark) Kris Nissen	Porsche Type-935 2.8L Turbo Flat-6	**Y**	225
7	**C2**	**102**	**(United Kingdom) Ecurie Ecosse**	**(United Kingdom) Ray Mallock (United Kingdom) David Leslie**	**Ecosse C286**	**A**	**221**
7	**C2**	**102**	**(United Kingdom) Ecurie Ecosse**	**(United Kingdom) Ray Mallock (United Kingdom) David Leslie**	**Ford Cosworth DFL 3.3L V8**	**A**	**221**
8	C2	111	(United Kingdom) Spice Engineering	(Spain) Fermín Vélez (United Kingdom) Gordon Spice	Spice SE86C	**A**	220
8	C2	111	(United Kingdom) Spice Engineering	(Spain) Fermín Vélez (United Kingdom) Gordon Spice	Ford Cosworth DFL 3.3L V8	**A**	220
9	C1	1	(Switzerland) Brun Motorsport	(Switzerland) Walter Brun (Spain) Jesús Pareja	Porsche 962C	**M**	219
9	C1	1	(Switzerland) Brun Motorsport	(Switzerland) Walter Brun (Spain) Jesús Pareja	Porsche Type-935 2.8L Turbo Flat-6	**M**	219
10	C2	101	(United Kingdom) Ecurie Ecosse	(Belgium) Marc Duez (United Kingdom) Mike Wilds	Ecosse C286	**A**	219
10	C2	101	(United Kingdom) Ecurie Ecosse	(Belgium) Marc Duez (United Kingdom) Mike Wilds	Ford Cosworth DFL 3.3L V8	**A**	219
11	C2	117	(Norway) Team Lucky Strike Schanche	(United Kingdom) Will Hoy (Norway) Martin Schanche	Argo JM19B	**A**	213
11	C2	117	(Norway) Team Lucky Strike Schanche	(United Kingdom) Will Hoy (Norway) Martin Schanche	Zakspeed 1.9L Turbo I4	**A**	213
12	C2	106	(Italy) Kelmar Racing	(Italy) Maurizio Gellini (Italy) Ranieri Randaccio (Italy) Pasquale Barberio	Tiga GC85	**A**	211
12	C2	106	(Italy) Kelmar Racing	(Italy) Maurizio Gellini (Italy) Ranieri Randaccio (Italy) Pasquale Barberio	Ford Cosworth DFL 3.3L V8	**A**	211
13	C2	118	(United Kingdom) Chamberlain Engineering	(United States) Olindo Iacobelli (France) Jean-Louis Ricci (New Zealand) John Nicholson	Spice SE86C	**A**	201
13	C2	118	(United Kingdom) Chamberlain Engineering	(United States) Olindo Iacobelli (France) Jean-Louis Ricci (New Zealand) John Nicholson	Ford DFL 3.3L V8	**A**	201
14	C2	114	Team Tiga Ford Denmark	(Denmark) Thorkild Thyrring (United Kingdom) Val Musetti	Tiga GC287	**A**	182
14	C2	114	Team Tiga Ford Denmark	(Denmark) Thorkild Thyrring (United Kingdom) Val Musetti	Ford Cosworth BDT-E 2.3L Turbo I4	**A**	182
15	C2	127	(United Kingdom) Chamberlain Engineering	(United Kingdom) Nick Adams (United Kingdom) John Foulston	Spice SE86C	**A**	181
15	C2	127	(United Kingdom) Chamberlain Engineering	(United Kingdom) Nick Adams (United Kingdom) John Foulston	Hart 418T 1.8L Turbo I4	**A**	181
16	C2	171	(Sweden) CEE Racing	(United Kingdom) John Fyda (United Kingdom) Laurence Jacobsen (Italy) Stefano Sebastiani	Tiga GC286	**A**	171
16	C2	171	(Sweden) CEE Racing	(United Kingdom) John Fyda (United Kingdom) Laurence Jacobsen (Italy) Stefano Sebastiani	Ford Cosworth BDT-E 2.3L Turbo I4	**A**	171
17 NC	C2	178	(France) Automobiles Louis Descartes	(France) Rudi Thomann (France) Jean-Claude Ferrarin (France) Gérard Tremblay	ALD 02	**A**	144
17 NC	C2	178	(France) Automobiles Louis Descartes	(France) Rudi Thomann (France) Jean-Claude Ferrarin (France) Gérard Tremblay	BMW M88 3.5L V8	**A**	144
18 NC	C2	198	(United Kingdom) Roy Baker Promotion	(United Kingdom) David Andrews (United Kingdom) Mike Kimpton (United Kingdom) Jeremy Rossiter	Tiga GC286	**A**	139
18 NC	C2	198	(United Kingdom) Roy Baker Promotion	(United Kingdom) David Andrews (United Kingdom) Mike Kimpton (United Kingdom) Jeremy Rossiter	Ford Cosworth DFL 3.3L V8	**A**	139
19 DNF	C2	123	(United Kingdom) Charles Ivey Racing	(United Kingdom) John Sheldon (France) Philippe de Henning	Tiga GC287	**A**	187
19 DNF	C2	123	(United Kingdom) Charles Ivey Racing	(United Kingdom) John Sheldon (France) Philippe de Henning	Porsche Type-935 2.6L Turbo Flat-6	**A**	187
20 DNF	C2	121	(United Kingdom) Cosmic GP Motorsport	(Greece) Costas Los (United Kingdom) Dudley Wood (United Kingdom) James Weaver	Tiga GC287	**G**	150
20 DNF	C2	121	(United Kingdom) Cosmic GP Motorsport	(Greece) Costas Los (United Kingdom) Dudley Wood (United Kingdom) James Weaver	Ford Cosworth DFL 3.3L V8	**G**	150
21 DNF	C2	177	(France) Automobiles Louis Descartes	(France) Jacques Heuclin (France) Dominique Lacaud (France) Louis Descartes	ALD 03	**A**	117
21 DNF	C2	177	(France) Automobiles Louis Descartes	(France) Jacques Heuclin (France) Dominique Lacaud (France) Louis Descartes	BMW M88 3.5L V8	**A**	117
22 DNF	C2	104	(Germany) URD Junior Team	(Germany) Rudi Seher (Germany) Hellmut Mundas (United Kingdom) Sean Walker	URD C81	**A**	97
22 DNF	C2	104	(Germany) URD Junior Team	(Germany) Rudi Seher (Germany) Hellmut Mundas (United Kingdom) Sean Walker	BMW M88 3.5L I6	**A**	97
23 DNF	C2	115	(United Kingdom) ADA Engineering	(United Kingdom) Tiff Needell (United Kingdom) Ian Harrower	ADA 02B	?	90
23 DNF	C2	115	(United Kingdom) ADA Engineering	(United Kingdom) Tiff Needell (United Kingdom) Ian Harrower	Ford Cosworth DFL 3.3L V8	?	90
24 DNF	C2	116	(Italy) Techno Racing	(Italy) Giovanni Lavaggi (Italy) Luigi Taverna (Switzerland) Jean-Pierre Frey	Alba AR3	**A**	82
24 DNF	C2	116	(Italy) Techno Racing	(Italy) Giovanni Lavaggi (Italy) Luigi Taverna (Switzerland) Jean-Pierre Frey	Ford Cosworth DFL 3.3L V8	**A**	82
25 DNF	C2	200	(Belgium) Dahm Cars Racing	(United Kingdom) Robin Donovan (Sweden) Kenneth Leim	Argo JM19	**G**	54
25 DNF	C2	200	(Belgium) Dahm Cars Racing	(United Kingdom) Robin Donovan (Sweden) Kenneth Leim	Porsche Type-930 3.2L Turbo Flat-6	**G**	54
26 DNF	C2	188	(United Kingdom) Ark Racing	(United Kingdom) Lawrie Hickman (United Kingdom) Max Payne	Ceekar 83J	?	10
26 DNF	C2	188	(United Kingdom) Ark Racing	(United Kingdom) Lawrie Hickman (United Kingdom) Max Payne	Ford Cosworth DFV 3.0L V8	?	10
27 DNF	C2	191	(United Kingdom) PC Automotive	(United Kingdom) Richard Piper (United Kingdom) Mike Catlow	Royale RP40	?	6
27 DNF	C2	191	(United Kingdom) PC Automotive	(United Kingdom) Richard Piper (United Kingdom) Mike Catlow	Ford Cosworth DFL 3.3L V8	?	6
DNS	C1	42	(France) Noël del Bello	(France) Jean-Pierre Jaussaud (France) Gilles Lempereur (France) Lucien Rossiaud	Sauber C8	?	-
DNS	C1	42	(France) Noël del Bello	(France) Jean-Pierre Jaussaud (France) Gilles Lempereur (France) Lucien Rossiaud	Mercedes-Benz M117 5.0L Turbo V8	?	-

== Statistics ==
- Pole Position - #5 Silk Cut Jaguar - 1:14.440
- Fastest Lap - #5 Silk Cut Jaguar - 1:16.440
- Average Speed - 179.936 km/h

World Sportscar Championship
Previous race: 1987 200 Miles of Norisring	1987 season	Next race: 1987 1000km of Nürburgring
