= 1987 1000 km of Silverstone =

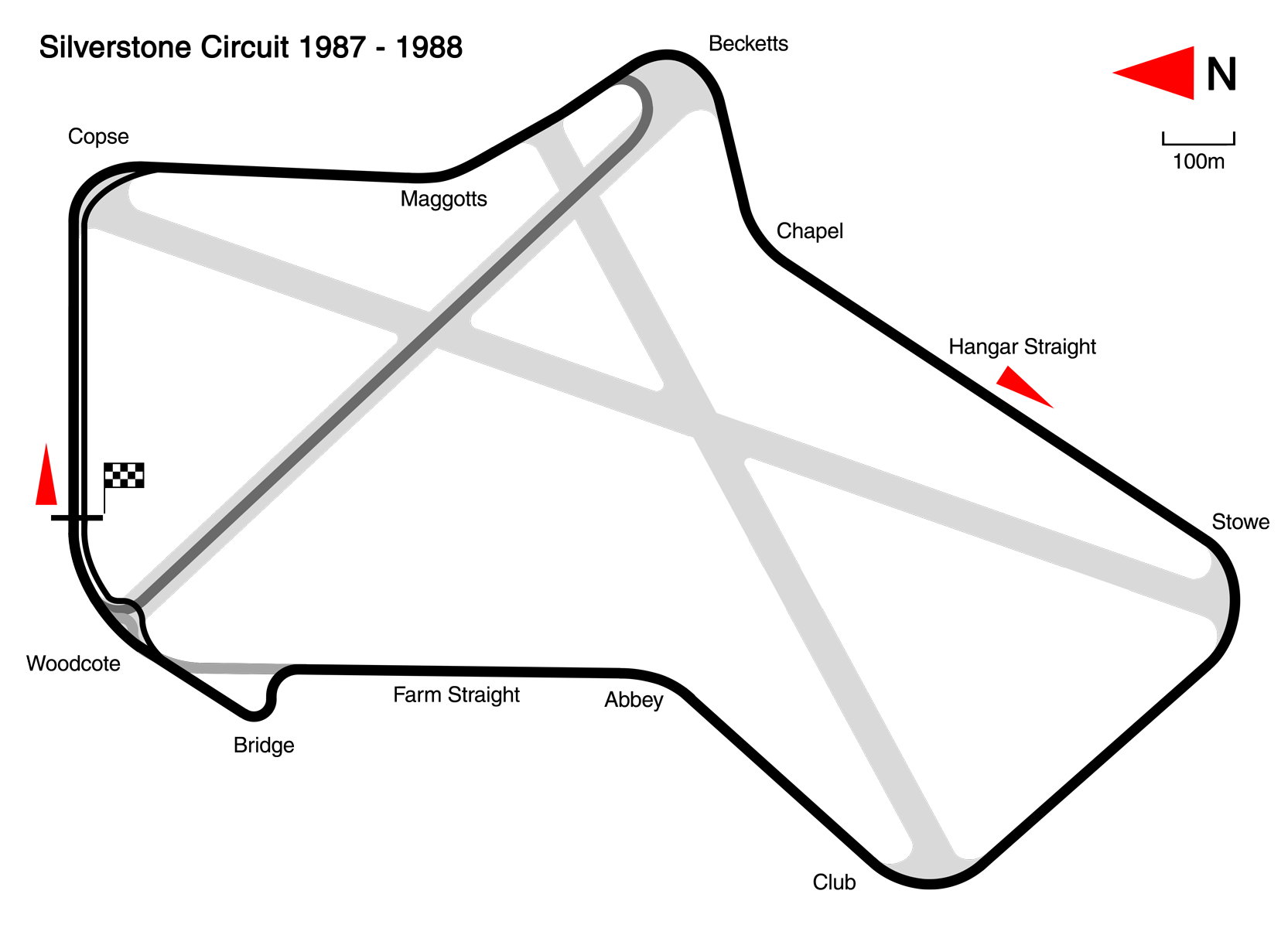
Map of the Silverstone Circuit (1987–1988)

The 1987 Autoglass 1000 km was the fourth round of the 1987 World Sports-Prototype Championship. It took place at the Silverstone Circuit, United Kingdom on 10 May 1987.

== Official results ==
Class winners in bold. Cars failing to complete 75% of the winner's distance marked as Not Classified (NC).

Pos	Class	No	Team	Drivers	Chassis	Tyre	Laps
Pos	Class	No	Team	Drivers	Engine	Tyre	Laps
1	**C1**	**4**	**(United Kingdom) Silk Cut Jaguar**	**(United States) Eddie Cheever (Brazil) Raul Boesel**	**Jaguar XJR-8**	**D**	**210**
1	**C1**	**4**	**(United Kingdom) Silk Cut Jaguar**	**(United States) Eddie Cheever (Brazil) Raul Boesel**	**Jaguar 7.0L V12**	**D**	**210**
2	C1	5	(United Kingdom) Silk Cut Jaguar	(Netherlands) Jan Lammers (United Kingdom) John Watson	Jaguar XJR-8	**D**	210
2	C1	5	(United Kingdom) Silk Cut Jaguar	(Netherlands) Jan Lammers (United Kingdom) John Watson	Jaguar 7.0L V12	**D**	210
3	C1	17	(Germany) Porsche AG	(Germany) Hans-Joachim Stuck (United Kingdom) Derek Bell	Porsche 962C	**D**	210
3	C1	17	(Germany) Porsche AG	(Germany) Hans-Joachim Stuck (United Kingdom) Derek Bell	Porsche Type-935 3.0L Turbo Flat-6	**D**	210
4	C1	18	(Germany) Porsche AG	(Germany) Jochen Mass (France) Bob Wollek	Porsche 962C	**D**	202
4	C1	18	(Germany) Porsche AG	(Germany) Jochen Mass (France) Bob Wollek	Porsche Type-935 3.0L Turbo Flat-6	**D**	202
5	C1	1	(Switzerland) Brun Motorsport	(Switzerland) Walter Brun (Germany) Uwe Schäfer (Spain) Jesús Pareja	Porsche 962C	**MI**	200
5	C1	1	(Switzerland) Brun Motorsport	(Switzerland) Walter Brun (Germany) Uwe Schäfer (Spain) Jesús Pareja	Porsche Type-935 2.8L Turbo Flat-6	**MI**	200
6	**C2**	**102**	**(United Kingdom) Swiftair Ecurie Ecosse**	**(United Kingdom) David Leslie (United Kingdom) Ray Mallock**	**Ecosse C286**	**A**	**191**
6	**C2**	**102**	**(United Kingdom) Swiftair Ecurie Ecosse**	**(United Kingdom) David Leslie (United Kingdom) Ray Mallock**	**Ford Cosworth DFL 3.3L V8**	**A**	**191**
7	C2	111	(United Kingdom) Spice Engineering	(United Kingdom) Gordon Spice (Spain) Fermín Vélez	Spice SE86C	**A**	191
7	C2	111	(United Kingdom) Spice Engineering	(United Kingdom) Gordon Spice (Spain) Fermín Vélez	Ford Cosworth DFL 3.3L V8	**A**	191
8	C2	101	(United Kingdom) Swiftair Ecurie Ecosse	(United Kingdom) Johnny Dumfries (United Kingdom) Mike Wilds	Ecosse C286	**A**	190
8	C2	101	(United Kingdom) Swiftair Ecurie Ecosse	(United Kingdom) Johnny Dumfries (United Kingdom) Mike Wilds	Ford Cosworth DFL 3.3L V8	**A**	190
9	**GTP**	**21**	**(United Kingdom) Richard Cleare Racing**	**(United Kingdom) James Weaver (United Kingdom) Andrew Gilbert-Scott (United Kingdom) Richard Cleare**	**March 85G**	?	**187**
9	**GTP**	**21**	**(United Kingdom) Richard Cleare Racing**	**(United Kingdom) James Weaver (United Kingdom) Andrew Gilbert-Scott (United Kingdom) Richard Cleare**	**Porsche Type-962 2.8L Turbo Flat-6**	?	**187**
10	C2	106	(Italy) Kelmar Racing	(Italy) Ranieri Randaccio (Italy) Maurizio Gellini (Italy) Pasquale Barberio	Tiga GC85	**A**	184
10	C2	106	(Italy) Kelmar Racing	(Italy) Ranieri Randaccio (Italy) Maurizio Gellini (Italy) Pasquale Barberio	Ford Cosworth DFL 3.3L V8	**A**	184
11	C2	123	(United Kingdom) Charles Ivey Racing	(United Kingdom) Ian Taylor (United Kingdom) Pete Lovett	Tiga GC287	**A**	179
11	C2	123	(United Kingdom) Charles Ivey Racing	(United Kingdom) Ian Taylor (United Kingdom) Pete Lovett	Porsche Type-935 2.6L Turbo Flat-6	**A**	179
12	C2	181	(United Kingdom) Dune Motorsport	(United Kingdom) Duncan Bain (Australia) Neil Crang (Switzerland) Jean Krucker	Tiga GC287	**A**	177
12	C2	181	(United Kingdom) Dune Motorsport	(United Kingdom) Duncan Bain (Australia) Neil Crang (Switzerland) Jean Krucker	Rover V64V 3.0L V6	**A**	177
13	C2	104	(Germany) URD Junior Team	(Germany) Rudi Seher (Germany) Hellmut Mundas (France) Rudi Thomann	URD C81/2	**A**	150
13	C2	104	(Germany) URD Junior Team	(Germany) Rudi Seher (Germany) Hellmut Mundas (France) Rudi Thomann	BMW M88 3.5L I6	**A**	150
14	C2	178	(France) Automobiles Louis Descartes	(France) Sylvain Bouley (France) Dominique Lacaud (France) Gérard Tremblay	ALD C2	**A**	148
14	C2	178	(France) Automobiles Louis Descartes	(France) Sylvain Bouley (France) Dominique Lacaud (France) Gérard Tremblay	BMW M88 3.5L I6	**A**	148
15 NC	C2	121	(United Kingdom) Cosmik Racing (United Kingdom) GP Motorsport	(United Kingdom) Dudley Wood (Greece) Costas Los	Tiga GC287	**A**	123
15 NC	C2	121	(United Kingdom) Cosmik Racing (United Kingdom) GP Motorsport	(United Kingdom) Dudley Wood (Greece) Costas Los	Ford Cosworth DFL 3.3L V8	**A**	123
16 NC	C2	190	(United Kingdom) Roy Baker Racing	(United Kingdom) John Sheldon (Canada) Robert Peters	Tiga GC286	**A**	87
16 NC	C2	190	(United Kingdom) Roy Baker Racing	(United Kingdom) John Sheldon (Canada) Robert Peters	Ford Cosworth BDT-E 1.7L Turbo I4	**A**	87
17 DNF	C1	2	(Switzerland) Brun Motorsport	(Italy) Massimo Sigala (Argentina) Oscar Larrauri	Porsche 962C	**MI**	165
17 DNF	C1	2	(Switzerland) Brun Motorsport	(Italy) Massimo Sigala (Argentina) Oscar Larrauri	Porsche Type-935 2.8L Turbo Flat-6	**MI**	165
18 DNF	C1	6	(United Kingdom) Silk Cut Jaguar	(United Kingdom) Martin Brundle (Denmark) John Nielsen	Jaguar XJR-8	**D**	165
18 DNF	C1	6	(United Kingdom) Silk Cut Jaguar	(United Kingdom) Martin Brundle (Denmark) John Nielsen	Jaguar 7.0L V12	**D**	165
19 DNF	C2	125	(France) Oudet Racing	(France) Jean-Claude Justice (France) Bruno Sotty (France) Patrick Oudet	Tiga GC84/5	?	132
19 DNF	C2	125	(France) Oudet Racing	(France) Jean-Claude Justice (France) Bruno Sotty (France) Patrick Oudet	Ford Cosworth DFL 3.3L V8	?	132
20 DNF	C2	103	(United Kingdom) John Bartlett Racing	(United Kingdom) John Barlett (United Kingdom) Val Musetti (Sweden) Kenneth Leim	Bardon DB1/2	?	123
20 DNF	C2	103	(United Kingdom) John Bartlett Racing	(United Kingdom) John Barlett (United Kingdom) Val Musetti (Sweden) Kenneth Leim	Ford Cosworth DFL 3.3L V8	?	123
21 DNF	C1	10	(Germany) Porsche Kremer Racing	(Germany) Volker Weidler (Denmark) Kris Nissen (Canada) Allen Berg	Porsche 962C	**Y**	122
21 DNF	C1	10	(Germany) Porsche Kremer Racing	(Germany) Volker Weidler (Denmark) Kris Nissen (Canada) Allen Berg	Porsche Type-935 2.8L Turbo Flat-6	**Y**	122
22 DNF	C1	61	(Switzerland) Kouros Mercedes	(France) Henri Pescarolo (New Zealand) Mike Thackwell	Sauber C9	**MI**	108
22 DNF	C1	61	(Switzerland) Kouros Mercedes	(France) Henri Pescarolo (New Zealand) Mike Thackwell	Mercedes-Benz M117 5.0L Turbo V8	**MI**	108
23 DNF	C2	127	(United Kingdom) Chamberlain Engineering	(United Kingdom) Nick Adams (South Africa) Graham Duxbury	Spice SE86C	**A**	105
23 DNF	C2	127	(United Kingdom) Chamberlain Engineering	(United Kingdom) Nick Adams (South Africa) Graham Duxbury	Hart 418T 1.8L Turbo I4	**A**	105
24 DNF	C2	198	(United Kingdom) Roy Baker Racing	(United Kingdom) David Andrews (Morocco) Max Cohen-Olivar	Tiga GC286	**A**	42
24 DNF	C2	198	(United Kingdom) Roy Baker Racing	(United Kingdom) David Andrews (Morocco) Max Cohen-Olivar	Ford Cosworth DFL 3.3L V8	**A**	42
25 DNF	C1	13	(France) Primagaz Competition	(France) Yves Courage (Belgium) Hervé Regout	Cougar C20	**MI**	35
25 DNF	C1	13	(France) Primagaz Competition	(France) Yves Courage (Belgium) Hervé Regout	Porsche Type-935 2.6L Turbo Flat-6	**MI**	35
26 DNF	C1	15	(United Kingdom) Liqui Moly Equipe	(Italy) Mauro Baldi (United Kingdom) Jonathan Palmer	Porsche 962C GTi	**G**	25
26 DNF	C1	15	(United Kingdom) Liqui Moly Equipe	(Italy) Mauro Baldi (United Kingdom) Jonathan Palmer	Porsche Type-935 2.8L Turbo Flat-6	**G**	25
DNS	C2	117	(Norway) Team Lucky Strike Schanche	(Norway) Martin Schanche (United Kingdom) Will Hoy	Argo JM19B	**A**	-
DNS	C2	117	(Norway) Team Lucky Strike Schanche	(Norway) Martin Schanche (United Kingdom) Will Hoy	Zakspeed 1.9L Turbo I4	**A**	-
DNQ	C2	177	(France) Automobiles Louis Descartes	(France) Jacques Heuclin (France) Louis Descartes	ALD C2	**A**	-
DNQ	C2	177	(France) Automobiles Louis Descartes	(France) Jacques Heuclin (France) Louis Descartes	Audi (WRT) 1.8L Turbo I4	**A**	-

== Statistics ==
- Pole Position - #17 Porsche AG - 1:15.110
- Fastest Lap - #4 Silk Cut Jaguar - 1:18.120
- Average Speed - 198.627 km/h

World Sportscar Championship
Previous race: 1987 1000 km of Monza	1987 season	Next race: 1987 24 Hours of Le Mans
