= 1988 1000 km of Silverstone =

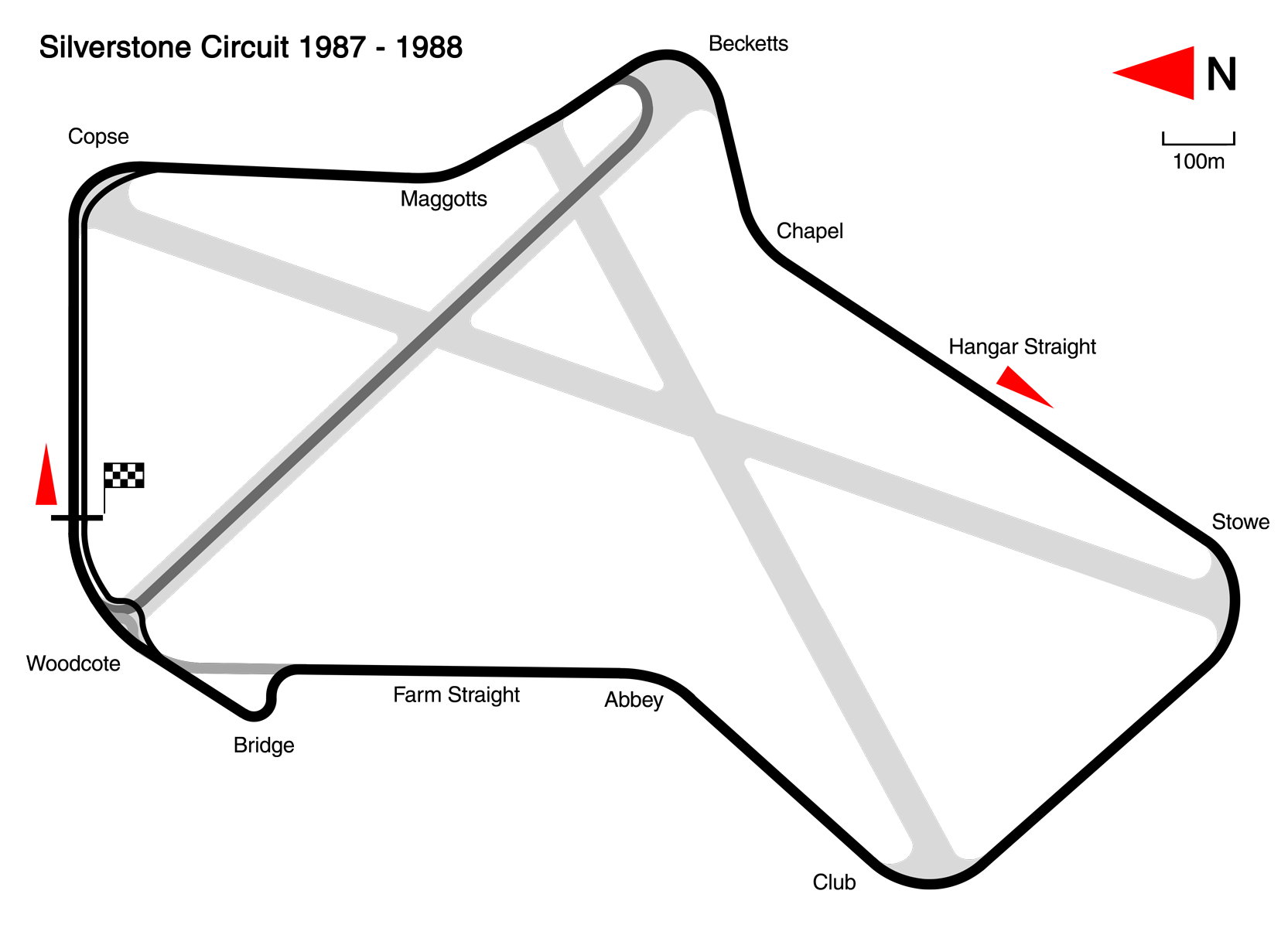
Map of the Silverstone Circuit (1987–1988)

The 1988 Autosport 1000 km was the fourth round of the 1988 World Sportscar Championship season. It took place at the Silverstone Circuit, United Kingdom on 8 May 1988.

== Official results ==
Class winners in bold. Cars failing to complete 75% of the winner's distance marked as Not Classified (NC).

Pos	Class	No	Team	Drivers	Chassis	Tyre	Laps
Pos	Class	No	Team	Drivers	Engine	Tyre	Laps
1	**C1**	**1**	**(United Kingdom) Silk Cut Jaguar**	**(United Kingdom) Martin Brundle (United States) Eddie Cheever**	**Jaguar XJR-9**	D	**210**
1	**C1**	**1**	**(United Kingdom) Silk Cut Jaguar**	**(United Kingdom) Martin Brundle (United States) Eddie Cheever**	**Jaguar 7.0L V12**	D	**210**
2	C1	61	(Switzerland) Team Sauber Mercedes	(France) Jean-Louis Schlesser (Germany) Jochen Mass	Sauber C9	M	210
2	C1	61	(Switzerland) Team Sauber Mercedes	(France) Jean-Louis Schlesser (Germany) Jochen Mass	Mercedes-Benz M117 5.0L Turbo V8	M	210
3	C1	62	(Switzerland) Team Sauber Mercedes	(Italy) Mauro Baldi (United Kingdom) James Weaver	Sauber C9	M	208
3	C1	62	(Switzerland) Team Sauber Mercedes	(Italy) Mauro Baldi (United Kingdom) James Weaver	Mercedes-Benz M117 5.0L Turbo V8	M	208
4	C1	7	(Germany) Blaupunkt Joest Racing	(France) Philippe Streiff (France) Bob Wollek (United Kingdom) David Hobbs	Porsche 962C	G	205
4	C1	7	(Germany) Blaupunkt Joest Racing	(France) Philippe Streiff (France) Bob Wollek (United Kingdom) David Hobbs	Porsche Type-935 3.0L Turbo Flat-6	G	205
5	C1	8	(Germany) Joest Racing	(Germany) Frank Jelinski (Germany) "John Winter" (Sweden) Stanley Dickens	Porsche 962C	G	198
5	C1	8	(Germany) Joest Racing	(Germany) Frank Jelinski (Germany) "John Winter" (Sweden) Stanley Dickens	Porsche Type-935 3.0L Turbo Flat-6	G	198
6	**C2**	**103**	**(United Kingdom) BP Spice Engineering**	**(Italy) Almo Coppelli (Denmark) Thorkild Thyrring**	**Spice SE88C**	G	**191**
6	**C2**	**103**	**(United Kingdom) BP Spice Engineering**	**(Italy) Almo Coppelli (Denmark) Thorkild Thyrring**	**Ford Cosworth DFL 3.3L V8**	G	**191**
7	C1	40	(Switzerland) Swiss Team Salamin	(Switzerland) Antoine Salamin (Morocco) Max Cohen-Olivar (Germany) Hellmut Mundas	Porsche 962C	G	191
7	C1	40	(Switzerland) Swiss Team Salamin	(Switzerland) Antoine Salamin (Morocco) Max Cohen-Olivar (Germany) Hellmut Mundas	Porsche Type-935 3.0L Turbo Flat-6	G	191
8	C2	111	(United Kingdom) BP Spice Engineering	(United Kingdom) Ray Bellm (United Kingdom) Gordon Spice	Spice SE88C	G	189
8	C2	111	(United Kingdom) BP Spice Engineering	(United Kingdom) Ray Bellm (United Kingdom) Gordon Spice	Ford Cosworth DFL 3.3L V8	G	189
9	**GTP**	**201**	**(Japan) Mazdaspeed**	**(Japan) Yojiro Terada (Japan) Yoshimi Katayama (Republic of Ireland) David Kennedy**	**Mazda 757**	D	**186**
9	**GTP**	**201**	**(Japan) Mazdaspeed**	**(Japan) Yojiro Terada (Japan) Yoshimi Katayama (Republic of Ireland) David Kennedy**	**Mazda 13J 2.6L 4-Rotor**	D	**186**
10	C2	109	(Italy) Kelmar Racing	(Italy) Ranieri Randaccio (Italy) Vito Veninata (Italy) Pasquale Barberio	Tiga GC288	A	181
10	C2	109	(Italy) Kelmar Racing	(Italy) Ranieri Randaccio (Italy) Vito Veninata (Italy) Pasquale Barberio	Ford Cosworth DFL 3.3L V8	A	181
11	C2	123	(United Kingdom) Charles Ivey Racing (United Kingdom) Team Istel	(United Kingdom) Chris Hodgetts (United Kingdom) Duncan Bain (United Kingdom) Tim Harvey	Tiga GC287	D	180
11	C2	123	(United Kingdom) Charles Ivey Racing (United Kingdom) Team Istel	(United Kingdom) Chris Hodgetts (United Kingdom) Duncan Bain (United Kingdom) Tim Harvey	Porsche Type-935 2.8L Turbo Flat-6	D	180
12	C2	107	(United Kingdom) Chamberlain Engineering	(France) Claude Ballot-Léna (France) Jean-Louis Ricci	Spice SE88C	A	166
12	C2	107	(United Kingdom) Chamberlain Engineering	(France) Claude Ballot-Léna (France) Jean-Louis Ricci	Ford Cosworth DFL 3.3L V8	A	166
13	C2	191	(United Kingdom) PC Automotive	(United Kingdom) Richard Piper (United States) Olindo Iacobelli	Argo JM19C	G	166
13	C2	191	(United Kingdom) PC Automotive	(United Kingdom) Richard Piper (United States) Olindo Iacobelli	Ford Cosworth DFL 3.3L V8	G	166
14	C2	198	(United Kingdom) Roy Baker Racing	(United Kingdom) Chris Ashmore (United Kingdom) Mike Kimpton (United Kingdom) David Andrews	Tiga GC286	G	165
14	C2	198	(United Kingdom) Roy Baker Racing	(United Kingdom) Chris Ashmore (United Kingdom) Mike Kimpton (United Kingdom) David Andrews	Ford Cosworth DFL 3.3L V8	G	165
15	C2	178	(France) Automobiles Louis Descartes	(France) Louis Descartes (France) Gérard Tremblay (France) Michel Lateste	ALD C2	A	156
15	C2	178	(France) Automobiles Louis Descartes	(France) Louis Descartes (France) Gérard Tremblay (France) Michel Lateste	BMW M80 3.5L I6	A	156
16	C2	181	(Italy) Luigi Taverna Technoracing	(Italy) Fabio Magnani (Italy) Luigi Taverna (Italy) Roberto Ragazzi	Olmas GLT-200	A	147
16	C2	181	(Italy) Luigi Taverna Technoracing	(Italy) Fabio Magnani (Italy) Luigi Taverna (Italy) Roberto Ragazzi	Ford Cosworth DFL 3.0L V8	A	147
17 NC	C2	115	(United Kingdom) ADA Engineering	(United Kingdom) Tom Dodd-Noble (United Kingdom) Colin Pool (Italy) Stefano Sebastiani	ADA 03	G	129
17 NC	C2	115	(United Kingdom) ADA Engineering	(United Kingdom) Tom Dodd-Noble (United Kingdom) Colin Pool (Italy) Stefano Sebastiani	Ford Cosworth DFL 3.3L V8	G	129
18 DSQ^{†}	C1	14	(United Kingdom) Richard Lloyd Racing	(United Kingdom) Derek Bell (United Kingdom) Tiff Needell	Porsche 962C GTi	G	205
18 DSQ^{†}	C1	14	(United Kingdom) Richard Lloyd Racing	(United Kingdom) Derek Bell (United Kingdom) Tiff Needell	Porsche Type-935 3.0L Turbo Flat-6	G	205
19 DNF	C1	2	(United Kingdom) Silk Cut Jaguar	(Netherlands) Jan Lammers (United Kingdom) Johnny Dumfries	Jaguar XJR-9	D	204
19 DNF	C1	2	(United Kingdom) Silk Cut Jaguar	(Netherlands) Jan Lammers (United Kingdom) Johnny Dumfries	Jaguar 7.0L V12	D	204
20 DNF	C2	112	(United Kingdom) FAI Automotive	(United Kingdom) Sean Walker (United Kingdom) Paul Stott (United Kingdom) Evan Clements	Tiga GC287	G	73
20 DNF	C2	112	(United Kingdom) FAI Automotive	(United Kingdom) Sean Walker (United Kingdom) Paul Stott (United Kingdom) Evan Clements	Ford Cosworth DFL 3.3L V8	G	73
21 DNF	C1	10	(Germany) Porsche Kremer Racing	(Germany) Harald Grohs (Denmark) Kris Nissen	Porsche 962C	Y	72
21 DNF	C1	10	(Germany) Porsche Kremer Racing	(Germany) Harald Grohs (Denmark) Kris Nissen	Porsche Type-935 3.0L Turbo Flat-6	Y	72
22 DNF	C1	42	(France) Unigestion Team (France) Noël del Bello	(France) Jacques Guillot (France) Noël del Bello (Switzerland) Bernard Santal	Sauber C8	G	69
22 DNF	C1	42	(France) Unigestion Team (France) Noël del Bello	(France) Jacques Guillot (France) Noël del Bello (Switzerland) Bernard Santal	Mercedes-Benz M117 5.0L Turbo V8	G	69
23 DNF	C2	177	(France) Automobiles Louis Descartes	(France) Dominique Lacaud (France) Michel Lateste	ALD C2	A	67
23 DNF	C2	177	(France) Automobiles Louis Descartes	(France) Dominique Lacaud (France) Michel Lateste	BMW M80 3.5L I6	A	67
23 DNF	C2	121	(United Kingdom) Cosmik GP Motorsport	(South Africa) Wayne Taylor (Greece) Costas Los	Spice SE87C	G	50
23 DNF	C2	121	(United Kingdom) Cosmik GP Motorsport	(South Africa) Wayne Taylor (Greece) Costas Los	Ford Cosworth DFL 3.3L V8	G	50
24 DNF	C2	127	(United Kingdom) Chamberlain Engineering	(United Kingdom) Ian Khan (United Kingdom) Nick Adams	Spice SE86C	A	40
24 DNF	C2	127	(United Kingdom) Chamberlain Engineering	(United Kingdom) Ian Khan (United Kingdom) Nick Adams	Hart 418T 1.8L Turbo I4	A	40
23 DNF	C2	24	(Italy) Dollop Racing	(Italy) Nicola Marozzo (Switzerland) Jean-Pierre Frey	Lancia LC2	D	28
23 DNF	C2	24	(Italy) Dollop Racing	(Italy) Nicola Marozzo (Switzerland) Jean-Pierre Frey	Ferrari 308C 3.0L Turbo V8	D	28
24 DNF	C2	117	(Norway) Team Lucky Strike Schanche	(Norway) Martin Schanche (United Kingdom) Will Hoy	Argo JM19C	G	4
24 DNF	C2	117	(Norway) Team Lucky Strike Schanche	(Norway) Martin Schanche (United Kingdom) Will Hoy	Ford Cosworth DFL 3.3L V8	G	4

† - The #14 Richard Lloyd Racing entry was disqualified after the race due to running a fuel cell which was too large.

== Statistics ==
- Pole Position - #61 Jean-Louis Schlesser - 1:15.020
- Fastest Lap - #62 Mauro Baldi - 1:18.240
- Average Speed - 207.024 km/h

World Sportscar Championship
Previous race: 1988 1000km of Monza	1988 season	Next race: 1988 24 Hours of Le Mans
