= Will Hoy =

British racing driver (1952–2002)

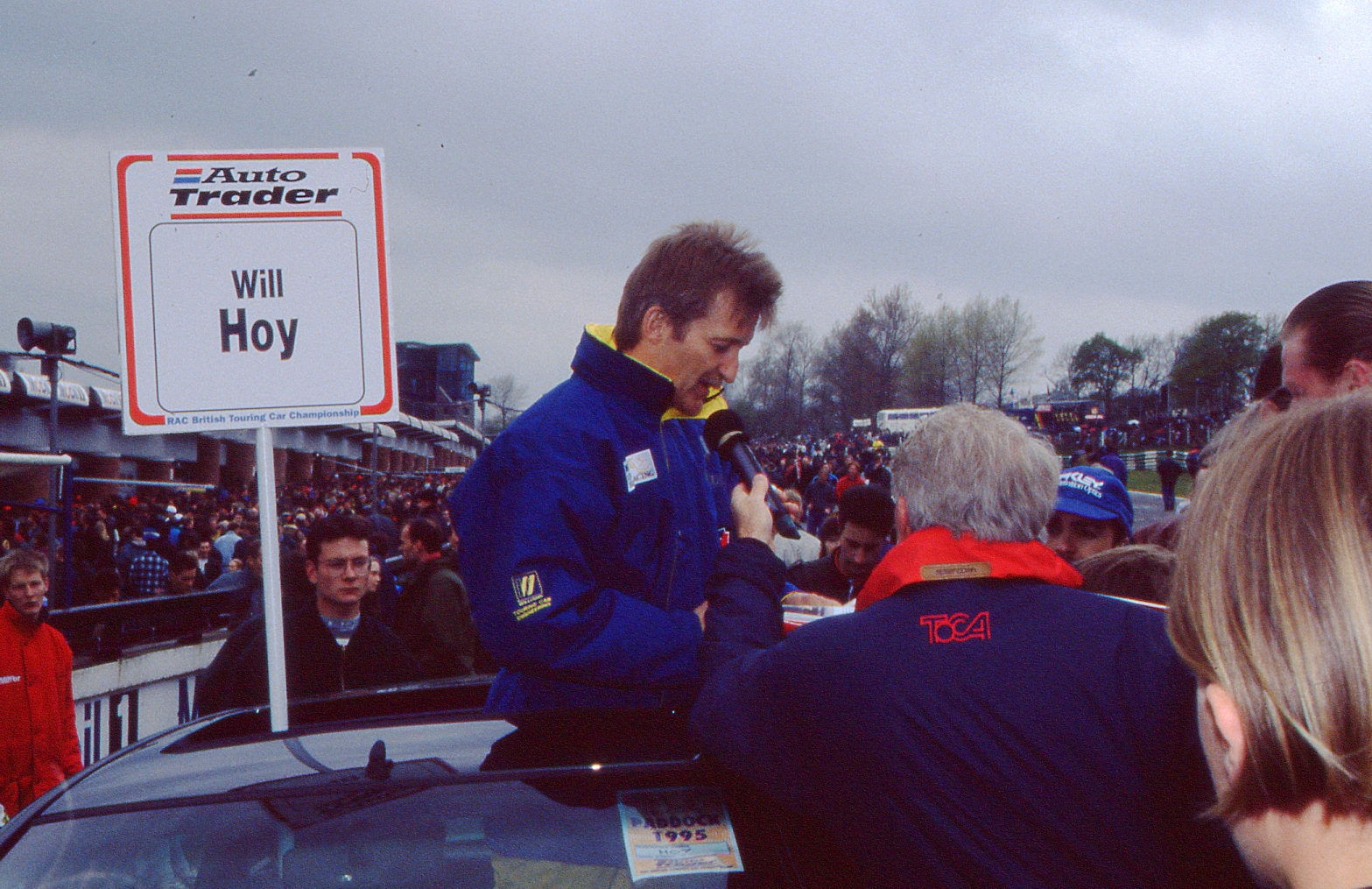
- Hoy at Brands Hatch in 1995
- Nationality: (United Kingdom) British
- Born: William Ewing Hoy; 2 April 1952 Melbourn, Cambridgeshire, England
- Died: 19 December 2002 (aged 50) Chelsea, London, England

British Touring Car Championship
- Years active: 1987–1989, 1991–2000
- Teams: Chris Hodgetts Motor Sport; BMW Team Finance; Trakstar Motorsport; BMW Team Listerine; Team Securicor ICS Toyota; Toyota Castrol Team; Williams Renault Dealer Racing; Ford Mondeo Racing; Arena International; Touring Car V.I.P. Club
- Starts: 185
- Wins: 9 (1 in class)
- Poles: 6 (1 in class)
- Fastest laps: 10
- Best finish: 1st in 1991

Championship titles
- 1988 1991: Japanese Touring Car Championship - Class JTC-2; British Touring Car Championship

William Ewing Hoy (2 April 1952 – 19 December 2002) was a British racing driver and the 1991 British Touring Car Champion, the highlight of a 20-year career in motor racing.

== Biography ==
Born in Melbourn, Cambridgeshire, Hoy did not begin racing until his late twenties and first raced at the international level in 1985, taking on the full World Sportscar Championship including Le Mans. Over the next few years, he raced in an assortment of championships and one-off races, the highlight undoubtedly being second overall in the 1988 All Japan Touring Car Championship. In 1989, Hoy made an appearance at Silverstone in the No. 89 Celebrity Car in the MG Metro Turbo Challenge but didn't finish. Hoy supplemented his racing career as a fully qualified chartered surveyor, employed first by Bernard Thorpe and latterly by DTZ. In late 2002, Hoy suffered an inoperable brain tumour and died shortly afterwards. He is survived by his wife and three children.

=== Racing career ===
In 1991, Hoy concentrated on the BTCC, in the first season of Super Touring regulations. Although manufacturers including Vauxhall and Toyota had factory entries, the established BMWs were the cars to have initially. Hoy made full use of his opportunity in a car entered by Vic Lee, building a championship lead nobody was able to overhaul. He also won the Willhire 24 Hour at Snetterton in a BMW M3, partnering Ray Bellm and Kurt Luby. For 1992, he was signed by the Toyota team, went into the final round in a three-way tussle for the championship but was beaten by Tim Harvey's BMW. However, the car was not competitive in subsequent seasons, Toyota won once in 1993 with Julian Bailey at Knockhill. The closest Hoy came was at Silverstone in 1993, when he was punted off onto his roof by team-mate Julian Bailey, an incident remembered for Murray Walker's commentary line "the car upside down is a Toyota", a play on the company's advertising slogan of the time (The car in front is a Toyota). In 1994, Hoy drove a factory-prepared Toyota Celica in the RAC Rally, of the World Rally Championship, but famously crashed into a tree on stage 4 of the rally. He and his co-driver were unhurt in the accident.

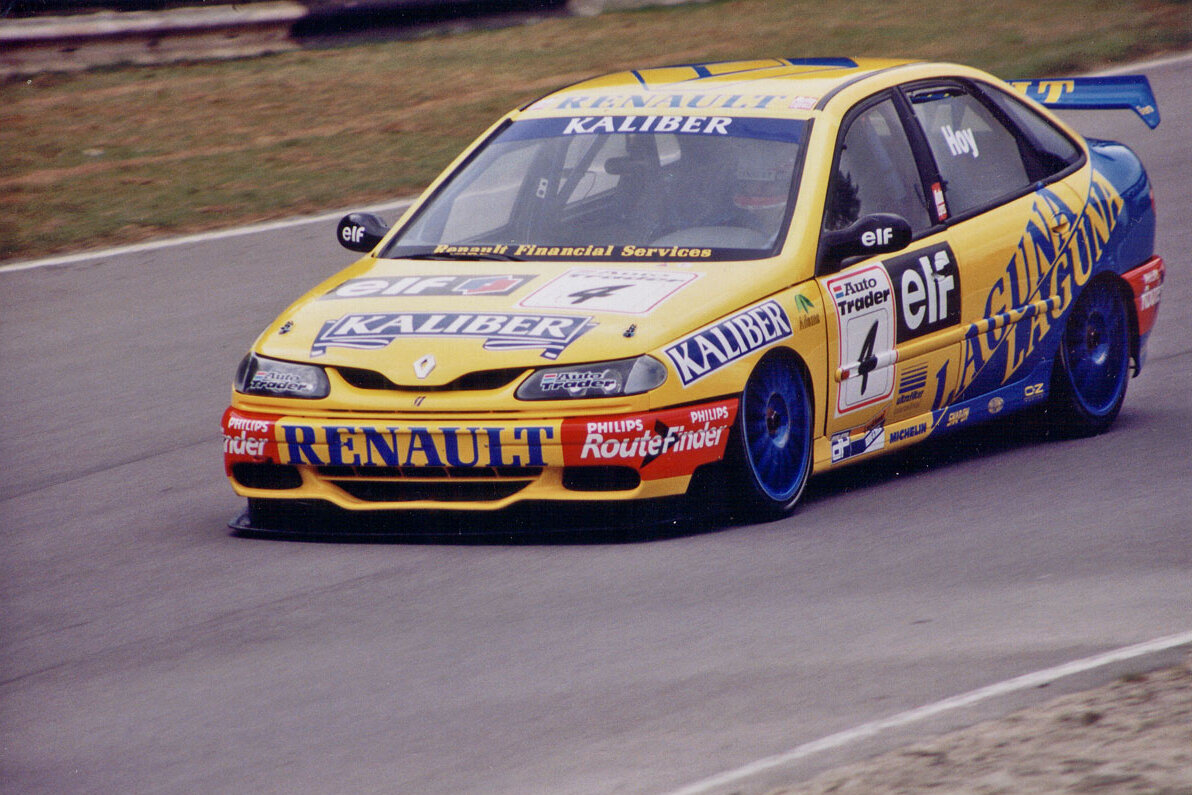
Hoy driving for Renault in the 1996 British Touring Car Championship

Despite two largely result-free seasons, Hoy was still an established star, and Renault hired him alongside Alain Menu for 1995. The early part of the season was a disaster, with many mechanical failures and crashes, although in the latter part of the season, Hoy moved up to fourth with three race wins, in what was now the fastest car. Hopes of a title push for 1996 was erased by the entry of the 4-wheel drive Audi of Frank Biela. Although Menu was again championship runner-up, Hoy slipped back to ninth.

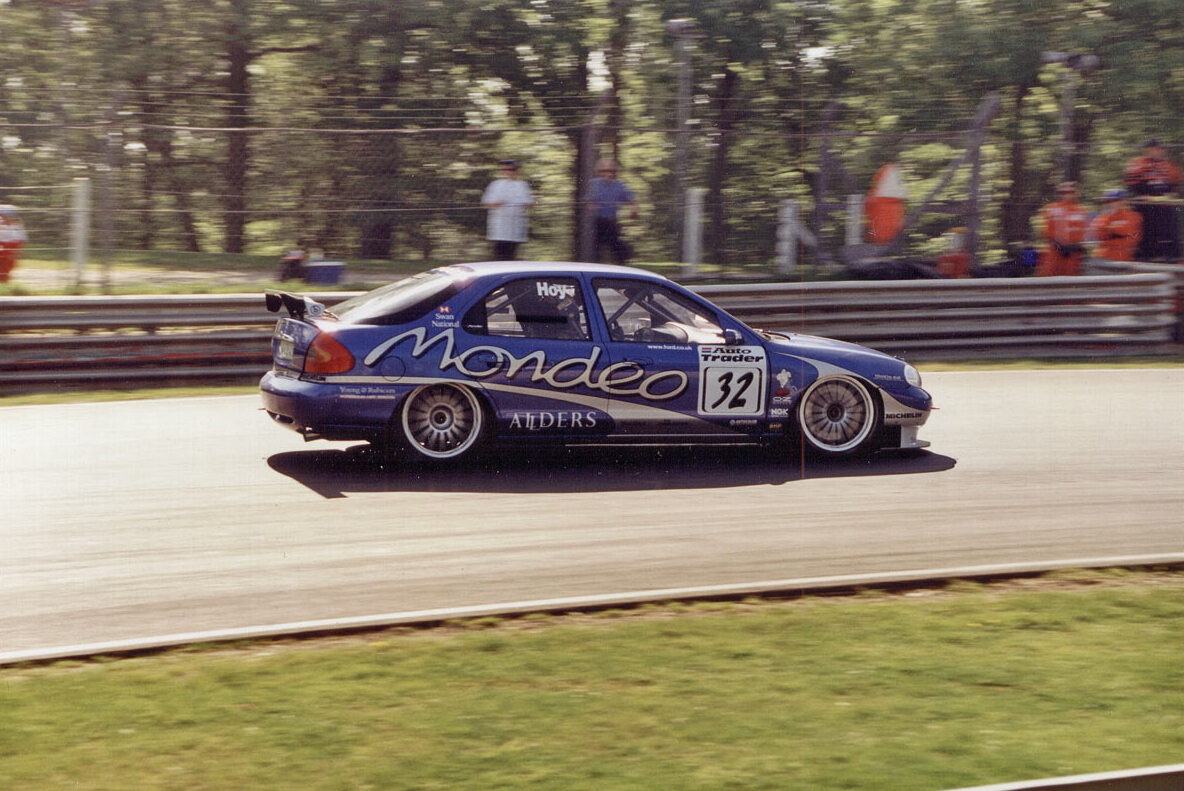
Hoy driving for Ford in the 1998 British Touring Car Championship

The BTCC of this era was dominated by high-investment manufacturer teams, largely made up of overseas former single-seater drivers. Like Tim Harvey and Robb Gravett, Hoy was struggling to remain in a competitive car or make use of it. He went to a fading Ford team for 1997 and 1998. 1997 was somewhat disappointing but 1998 was a much better performance, with Hoy finishing in the top-ten in the championship in one of the least competitive works cars and even picking up a race win at Round 4 at Silverstone. Hoy raced independently in the BTCC for part of 1999, outperforming the rest of the independents in a half-season campaign using the Arena Motorsport Renault Laguna before entering semi-retirement. He also competed with Chamberlain Motorsport for two rounds of 1999 FIA GT Championship. His last appearance came at Silverstone in 2000 in a Class B Vic Lee Racing Peugeot 306, securing pole position in class for both races, but retiring from both races with mechanical failures. Hoy was a commentator for the 2002 BTCC season alongside Ben Edwards in addition to being part of the works Honda BTCC team in a managerial role alongside driver Andy Priaulx.

== Racing record ==
=== Complete World Sportscar Championship results ===
(key) (Races in bold indicate pole position) (Races in italics indicate fastest lap)

Year	Entrant	Class	Car	Engine	1	2	3	4	5	6	7	8	9	10	11	Pos.	Pts
1985	(United Kingdom) **Roy Baker Promotions**	C2	Tiga GC284	Ford BDT 1.7L Turbo I4	MUG	MNZ; Ret	SIL; Ret		HOC; Ret	MOS	SPA	BRH; Ret	FUJ	SHA		NC	0
1985	(United Kingdom) **Roy Baker Promotions**	C2	Tiga GC285	Ford BDT 1.7L Turbo I4				LMS; 21								NC	0
1986	(United Kingdom) **Chamberlain Engineering**	C2	Tiga TS85	Hart 418T 1.8 L Turbo I4	MNZ; Ret	SIL; DNS	LMS	NOR	BRH; 16	JER	NÜR	SPA; 21	FUJ; Ret			NC	0
1987	(Norway) **Team Lucky Strike Schanche**	C2	Argo JM19B	Zakspeed 1.9 L Turbo I4	JAR; Ret	JER; Ret	MNZ; 11	SIL; DNS	LMS; Ret	NOR; 12	BRH; 11	NÜR; Ret	SPA; 14			NC	0
1987	(Japan) **Auto Beaurex Motorsport**	C1	Tom's 86C	Toyota 3S-GTM 2.1 L Turbo I4										FUJ; Ret		NC	0
1988	(Norway) **Team Lucky Strike Schanche**	C2	Argo JM19C	Ford Cosworth DFL 3.3 L V8	JER; 11	JAR; 17	MNZ; Ret	SIL; Ret		BRN	BRH; 10	NÜR	SPA	FUJ	SAN	66th	6
1988	(Japan) **Mazdaspeed Co. Ltd.**	IMSA GTP	Mazda 767	Mazda 13J 2.6 L 4-rotor					LMS; 19							66th	6
1989	(West Germany) **Dauer Racing**	C1	Porsche 962C	Porsche Type-935/82 3.0 L Turbo Flat-6	SUZ	DIJ	JAR	BRH; Ret	NÜR; Ret	DON; DNS	SPA	MEX				NC	0
1990	(France) **Courage Compétition**	C1	Porsche 962C	Porsche Type-935/82 3.0 L Turbo Flat-6	SUZ; 14											NC	0
1990	(United Kingdom) **GP Motorsport**	C1	Spice SE90C	Ford Cosworth DFR 3.5 L V8		MNZ; Ret	SIL	SPA	DIJ	NÜR						NC	0
1990	(United Kingdom) **Chamberlain Engineering**	C1	Spice SE89C	Ford Cosworth DFZ 3.5 L V8							DON; Ret	CGV	MEX			NC	0
1991	(Switzerland) **Team Salamin Primagaz**	C1	Porsche 962C	Porsche Type-935/82 3.2 L Turbo Flat-6	SUZ	MNZ	SIL	LMS; Ret	NÜR	MAG	MEX	AUT				NC	0
1992	(United Kingdom) **Chamberlain Engineering**	FIA Cup	Spice SE89C	Ford Cosworth DFZ 3.5 L V8	MNZ	SIL; 3	LMS	DON; 6	SUZ	MAG						10th	18

=== Complete British Touring Car Championship results ===
(key) Races in bold indicate pole position (1 point awarded – 1996 onwards in all races, 1987–1989 and 2000 in class) Races in italics indicate fastest lap (1 point awarded – 1987–1989 in class) (* signifies that driver lead feature race for at least one lap – 1 point awarded 1998 onwards)

Year	Team	Car	Class	1	2	3	4	5	6	7	8	9	10	11	12	13	14	15	16	17	18	19	20	21	22	23	24	25	26	Overall Pos	Overall Pts	Class Pos
1987	Chris Hodgetts Motor Sport	Toyota Corolla GT	D	SIL	OUL	THR	THR	SIL	SIL ovr:14 cls:3	BRH	SNE	DON	OUL	DON	SIL															NC†	0†	NC†
1988	BMW Finance Racing	BMW M3	B	SIL	OUL	THR	DON; Ret‡	THR	SIL	SIL	BRH ovr:9 cls:3	SNE ovr:10 cls:2	BRH	BIR	DON	SIL ovr:8 cls:2														19th	16	5th
1989	BMW Team Finance	BMW M3	B	OUL	SIL	THR	DON ovr:6‡ cls:1‡	THR	SIL	SIL	BRH																			43rd	9	8th
1989	Trakstar Motorsport	Ford Sierra RS500	A									SNE ovr:4 cls:4	BRH	BIR	DON	SIL														49th	3	19th
1991	BMW Team Listerine	BMW M3		SIL; 1	SNE; 1	DON; Ret	**THR**; 3	SIL; 3^{1}	BRH; 2	SIL; 2	DON; 1 Ret	DON; 2 DNS	OUL; 2	BRH; 1; 2	BRH; 2; 1	DON; 3	THR; Ret	SIL; 5												**1st**	**155**	
1992	Team Securicor ICS Toyota	Toyota Carina		SIL; 4	THR; 4	**OUL**; 2	**SNE**; 1	**BRH**; Ret	**DON**; **1**; 1	**DON**; **2**; 2	SIL; 2	KNO; 1; 5	KNO; 2 Ret	PEM; 5	BRH; 1; 2	BRH; 2; 2	DON; 4	SIL; 5												**2nd**	**149**	
1993	Team Securicor Toyota	Toyota Carina E		SIL; 4	DON; Ret	SNE; 4	DON; 6	OUL; Ret	BRH; 1; 3	BRH; 2; 14	PEM; 2	SIL; Ret	KNO; 1; 10	KNO; 2; 3	OUL; Ret	BRH; 4	THR; 10	DON; 1; 16	DON; 2; 16	SIL; 3										7th	79	
1994	Toyota Castrol Team	Toyota Carina E		THR; 5	BRH; 1; 9	BRH; 2; 9	SNE; 12	SIL; 1; 6	SIL; 2; 6	OUL; Ret	DON; 1; 10	DON; 2; 7	BRH; 1 Ret	BRH; 2; 17	SIL; 9	KNO; 1; 9	KNO; 2; 8	OUL; 11	BRH; 1; 12	BRH; 2 DNS	SIL; 1; 7	SIL; 2; 7	DON; 1; 18	DON; 2; 7						13th	48	
1995	Williams Renault Dealer Racing	Renault Laguna		DON; 1; 6	DON; 2; 5	BRH; 1; 9	BRH; 2; 7	THR; 1 Ret	THR; 2 Ret	SIL; 1; 5	SIL; 2; 15	OUL; 1 Ret	OUL; 2; 18	BRH; 1; 4	BRH; 2; 4	DON; 1; 12	DON; 2; 8	SIL; 2	KNO; 1 Ret	KNO; 2 Ret	BRH; 1; 1	BRH; 2; 2	SNE; 1; 12	SNE; 2; 1	OUL; 1; 2	OUL; 2 Ret	SIL; 1; 2	SIL; 2; 1		4th	195	
1996	Williams Renault Dealer Racing	Renault Laguna		DON; 1; 2	DON; 2; 2	BRH; 1; 17	BRH; 2 DSQ	THR; 1; 5	THR; 2; 15	SIL; 1; 8	SIL; 2 Ret	OUL; 1 Ret	OUL; 2; 6	SNE; 1; 7	SNE; 2; 9	BRH; 1; 4	BRH; 2; 3	SIL; 1; 9	SIL; 2; 6	KNO; 1; 10	KNO; 2; 11	OUL; 1; 4	OUL; 2 Ret	THR; 1 Ret	THR; 2; 19	DON; 1; 5	DON; 2; 4	BRH; 1; 8	BRH; 2 Ret	9th	92	
1997	Team Mondeo	Ford Mondeo		DON; 1 Ret	DON; 2 DNS	SIL; 1; 12	SIL; 2; 7	THR; 1; 11	THR; 2; 12	BRH; 1 DSQ	BRH; 2; 17	OUL; 1 DNS	OUL; 2 DNS	DON; 1; 13	DON; 2; 9	CRO; 1; 8	CRO; 2 Ret	KNO; 1; 12	KNO; 2; 14	SNE; 1; 10	SNE; 2; 7	THR; 1; 5	THR; 2; 9	BRH; 1; 7	BRH; 2 Ret	SIL; 1 Ret	SIL; 2; 10			15th	27	
1998	Ford Mondeo Racing	Ford Mondeo		THR; 1 Ret	THR; 2; 15	SIL; 1; 9	SIL; 2; 1*	DON; 1; 8	DON; 2; 16	BRH; 1; 7	BRH; 2 Ret	OUL; 1; 8	OUL; 2; 7	DON; 1; 3	DON; 2 Ret	CRO; 1; 13	CRO; 2; 9*	SNE; 1; 8	SNE; 2; 8	THR; 1; 10	THR; 2; 12	KNO; 1; 6	KNO; 2 Ret	BRH; 1 Ret	BRH; 2 Ret	OUL; 1; 8	OUL; 2; 6	SIL; 1; 10	SIL; 2; 8	10th	69	
1999	Arena International	Renault Laguna		DON; 1	DON; 2	SIL; 1	SIL; 2	THR; 1	THR; 2	BRH; 1	BRH; 2	OUL; 1	OUL; 2	DON; 1	DON; 2	CRO; 1	CRO; 2	SNE; 1; 10	SNE; 2; 13	THR; 1; 10	THR; 2; 8	KNO; 1; 13	KNO; 2; 11	BRH; 1; 13	BRH; 2; 11	OUL; 1; 10	OUL; 2; 11	SIL; 1; 6	SIL; 2; 7	15th	15	
2000	Touring Car V.I.P. Club	Peugeot 306 GTi	B	BRH; 1	BRH; 2	DON; 1	DON; 2	THR; 1	THR; 2	KNO; 1	KNO; 2	OUL; 1	OUL; 2	SIL; 1 Ret	SIL; 2 Ret	CRO; 1	CRO; 2	SNE; 1	SNE; 2	DON; 1	DON; 2	BRH; 1	BRH; 2	OUL; 1	OUL; 2	SIL; 1	SIL; 2			N/A	2	15th

1. – Race was stopped due to heavy rain. No points were awarded.

† Not eligible for points. ‡ Endurance driver.

=== Complete Japanese Touring Car Championship results ===
(key) (Races in bold indicate pole position) (Races in italics indicate fastest lap)

Year	Team	Car	Class	1	2	3	4	5	6	DC	Pts	Class
1988	Autotech Racing Team	BMW M3	JTC-2	SUZ; 4	NIS; 2	SEN; 5	TSU; 5	SUG; 8	FUJ; 8	**2nd**	**144**	**1st**
1990	Team Taisan	BMW M3	JTC-2	NIS; 7	SUG; Ret	SUZ; 9	TSU; 9			19th	62	5th
1990	Team Taisan	BMW M3 Sport Evolution	JTC-2					SEN; 8	FUJ; Ret	19th	62	5th

=== Complete European Touring Car Championship results ===
(key) (Races in bold indicate pole position) (Races in italics indicate fastest lap)

Year	Team	Car	1	2	3	4	5	6	7	8	9	10	11	DC	Pts
1988	(United Kingdom) BMW Finance Racing	BMW M3	MNZ	DON; 3†	EST	JAR	DIJ	VAL	NÜR	SPA	ZOL	SIL; 13/Ret	NOG	NC	0

† Not eligible for points.

=== Complete Asia-Pacific Touring Car Championship results ===
(key) (Races in bold indicate pole position) (Races in italics indicate fastest lap)

Year	Team	Car	1	2	3	4	DC	Points
1988	(Japan) Autotech Racing Team	BMW M3	BAT	WEL	PUK	FJI; 8	NC	0

=== Complete Italian Touring Car Championship results ===
(key) (Races in bold indicate pole position) (Races in italics indicate fastest lap)

Year	Team	Car	1	2	3	4	5	6	7	8	9	10	11	12	13	14	15	16	17	18	19	20	DC	Pts
1995	Williams Renault Dealer Racing	Renault Laguna	MIS; 1	MIS; 2	BIN; 1	BIN; 2	MNZ; 1	MNZ; 2	IMO; 1	IMO; 2	MAG; 1	MAG; 2	MUG; 1	MUG; 2	MIS; 1	MIS; 2	PER; 1	PER; 2	VAR; 1	VAR; 2	VAL; 1; 5‡	VAL; 2; 4‡	NC‡	0‡

‡ Guest driver – not eligible for points

=== Complete FIA GT Championship results ===
(key) (Races in bold indicate pole position) (Races in italics indicate fastest lap)

Year	Team	Car	1	2	3	4	5	6	7	8	9	10	Pos.	Pts
1999	(United Kingdom) **Chamberlain Motorsport**	Chrysler Viper GTS-R	MNZ; Ret	SIL; Ret	HOC	HUN	ZOL	OSC	DON	HOM	GLN	ZHU	NC	0

=== Complete 24 Hours of Le Mans results ===
Year	Team	Co-Drivers	Car	Class	Laps	Pos.	Class Pos.
1985	(United Kingdom) Roy Baker Promotions	(United States) Nick Nicholson (United Kingdom) Paul Smith	Tiga GC285-Ford Cosworth	C2	274	21st	4th
1987	(Norway) Team Lucky Strike Schanche	(Norway) Martin Schanche (United Kingdom) Robin Smith	Argo JM19B-Zakspeed	C2	5	DNF	DNF
1988	(Japan) Mazdaspeed Co. Ltd.	(Belgium) Hervé Regout (Japan) Takashi Yorino	Mazda 767	GTP	305	19th	**3rd**
1989	(Australia) Team Schuppan	(France) Jean Alesi (United States) Dominic Dobson	Porsche 962C	C1	69	DNF	DNF
1991	(Switzerland) Team Salamin Primagaz	(Sweden) Eje Elgh (Austria) Roland Ratzenberger	Porsche 962C	C1	202	DNF	DNF

=== Complete 24 Hours of Spa results ===
Year	Team	Co-Drivers	Car	Class	Laps	Pos.	Class Pos.
1993	(United Kingdom) **Toyota UK**	(United Kingdom) Julian Bailey (Belgium) Eric van de Poele	Toyota Carina E	Class 2	271	23rd	**3rd**
1994	(United Kingdom) **Toyota Racing**	(Belgium) Pierre-Alain Thibaut (Belgium) Renaud Verreydt	Toyota Carina E		?	DNF	DNF

=== Complete WRC results ===
Year	Entrant	Car	1	2	3	4	5	6	7	8	9	10	11	12	13	WDC	Points
1994	Will Hoy	Toyota Celica GT-Four ST185	MON	POR	KEN	FRA	GRC	ARG	NZL	FIN	ITA	GBR; Ret				NC	0
1998	Ford Motor Co. Ltd.	Ford Escort Kit Car	MON	SWE	KEN	POR	ESP	FRA	ARG	GRC	NZL	FIN	ITA	AUS	GBR; 53	NC	0

Sporting positions
Preceded by Robb Gravett	British Touring Car Champion; 1991	Succeeded by Tim Harvey
