= Tiga GC287 =

Race car

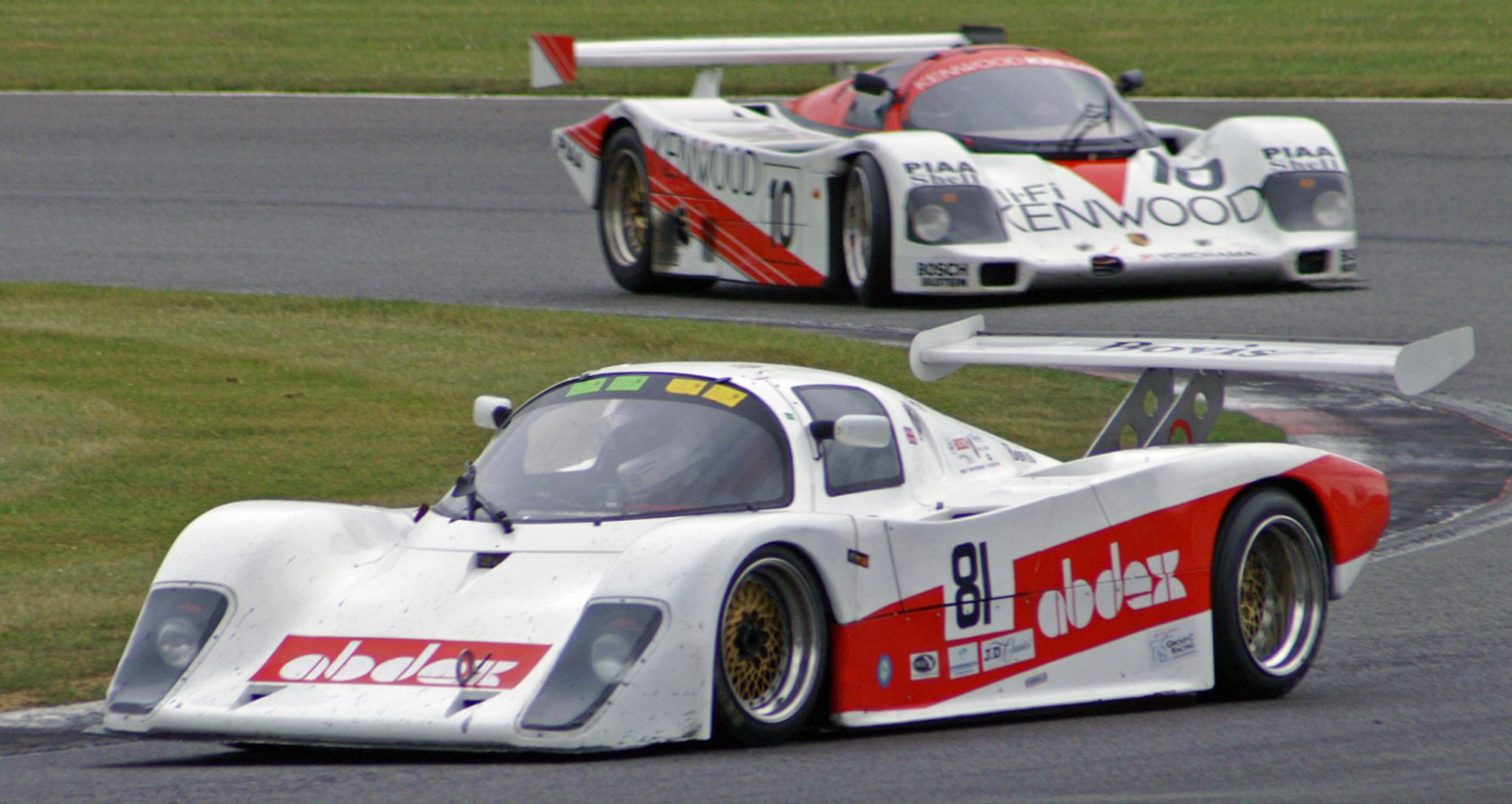
- Category: Group C2

Technical specifications
- Chassis: Aluminum honeycomb monocoque, carbon-fiber composite/kevlar body
- Suspension: Double wishbones, pull-rod actuated coil springs and shock absorbers, anti-roll bar (front); Lower wishbones, top rockers actuating in-board mounted coil springs over shock absorbers, anti-roll bar (rear)
- Length: 4,410 mm (174 in)
- Width: 1,790 mm (70 in)
- Height: 1,000 mm (39 in)
- Axle track: 1,480 mm (58 in) (front); 1,626 mm (64.0 in) (rear)
- Wheelbase: 2,550 mm (100 in)
- Engine: Ford-Cosworth DFL 3.3 L (201.4 cu in) 90° DOHC V8 naturally-aspirated mid-engined Ford Cosworth BDT 2.1 L (128.1 cu in) DOHC I4 turbocharged mid-engined Porsche 935/76 2.65 L (161.7 cu in) SOHC F6 turbocharged Rover V64V 3.0 L (183.1 cu in) 90° DOHC V6 naturally-aspirated mid-engined Chevrolet 3.0 L (183.1 cu in) 60° DOHC V6 naturally-aspirated mid-engined
- Transmission: Hewland 5-speed manual
- Power: ~ 380 hp (280 kW)
- Weight: 800 kg (1,800 lb)
- Tires: Avon; Goodyear

Competition history
- Debut: 1987 360 km of Jarama
Wins
2

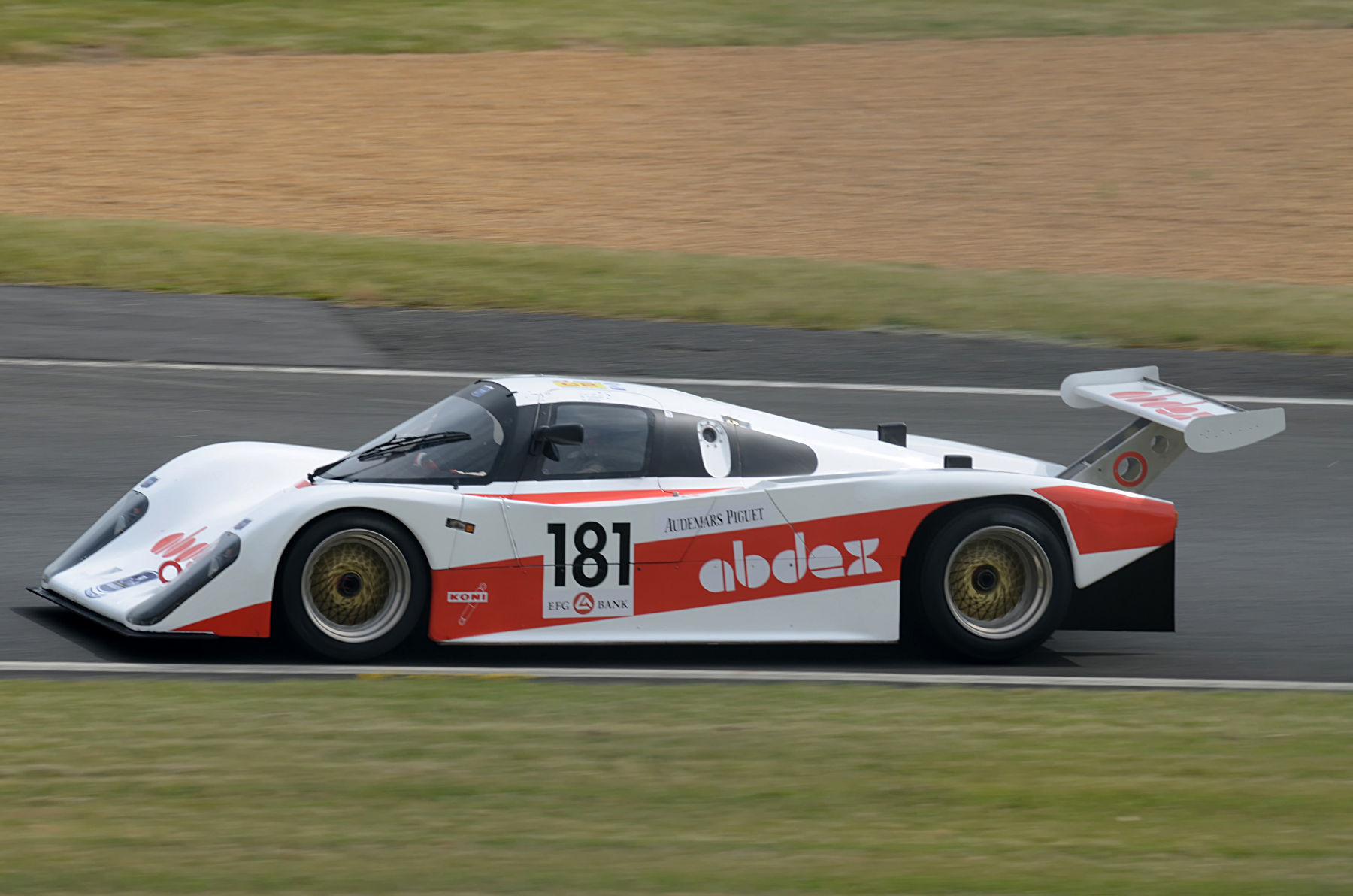
Tiga GC287 at the 2014 Le Mans Classic

The Tiga GC287 is a sports prototype race car, designed, developed, and built by British manufacturer Tiga Race Cars, for sports car racing, conforming to the Group C2 rules and regulations, in 1987.
