= Jaguar XJR-8 =

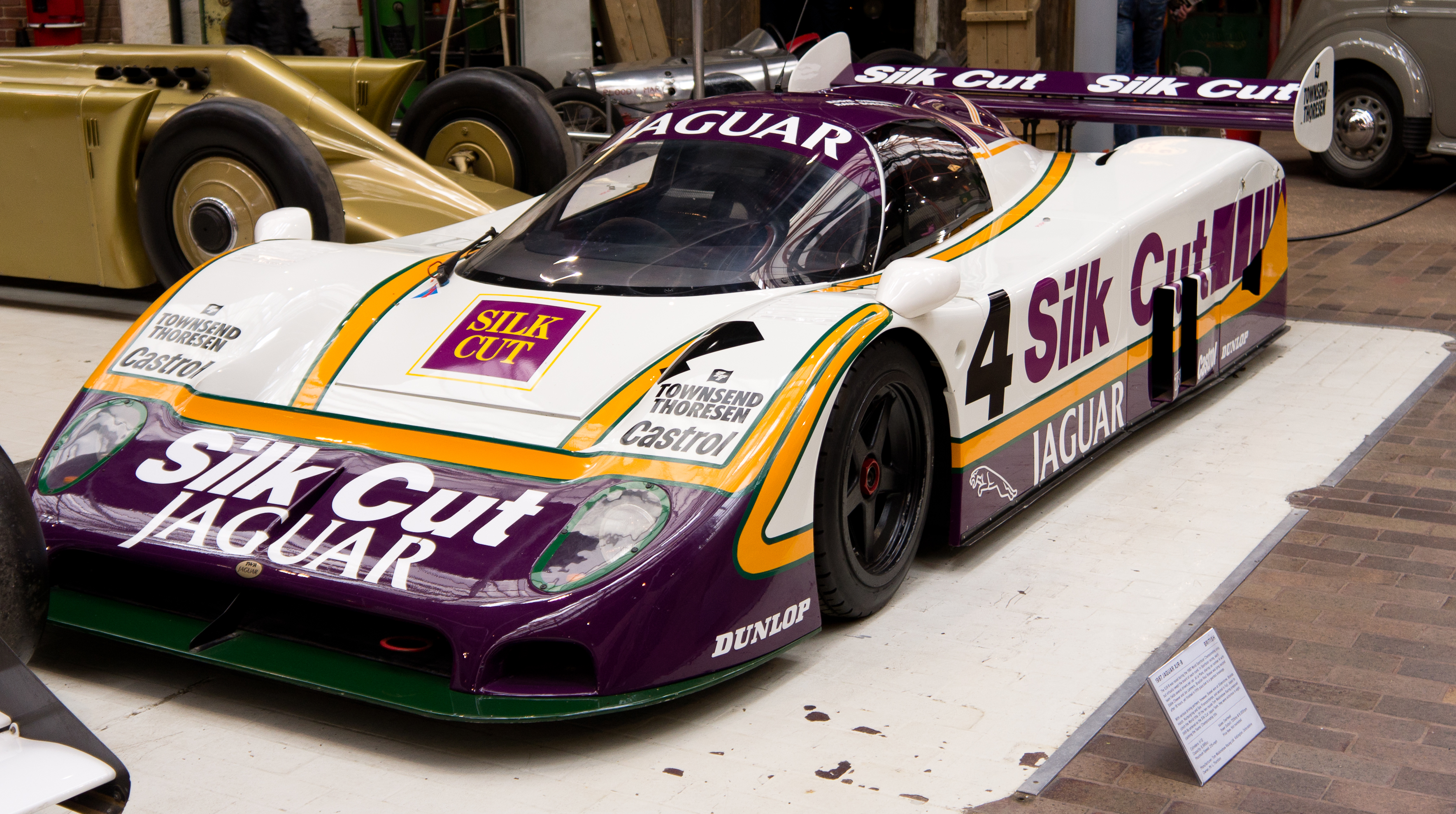
- 1987 Jaguar XJR-8 at Beaulieu Motor Museum

Overview
- Manufacturer: Jaguar
- Production: 1987
- Assembly: Kidlington, Oxfordshire
- Designer: Tony Southgate for TWR

Body and chassis
- Class: Racing car
- Body style: 2-door Coupé
- Layout: RMR layout
- Related: Jaguar XJR sportscars

Powertrain
- Engine: 7.0 L 60 degree Jaguar V12

Dimensions
- Wheelbase: 2,780 mm (109.4 in)
- Length: 4,800 mm (189.0 in)
- Width: 2,000 mm (78.7 in)
- Height: 1,100 mm (43.3 in)
- Kerb weight: 900 kg (1,984 lb)

Chronology
- Predecessor: Jaguar XJR-6
- Successor: Jaguar XJR-9

The XJR-8 was a race car built by Jaguar for campaigning in the World Sportscar Championship and the 24 Hours of Le Mans as part of Group C. It was used during the 1987 season.

== History ==
In the 1980s racing expert Tom Walkinshaw and designer Tony Southgate, with support from the Jaguar company and a sponsor, Silk Cut, designed a car based on the Jaguar V12 to compete in the ultra-high performance Le Mans Group C class and the North American-based IMSA GT Championship in competition with Porsche and Mercedes. In all, sixty-four changes to the XJR-6 were made to create the XJR-8. Six cars were produced (three plus three converted XJR-6s).

== Performance ==
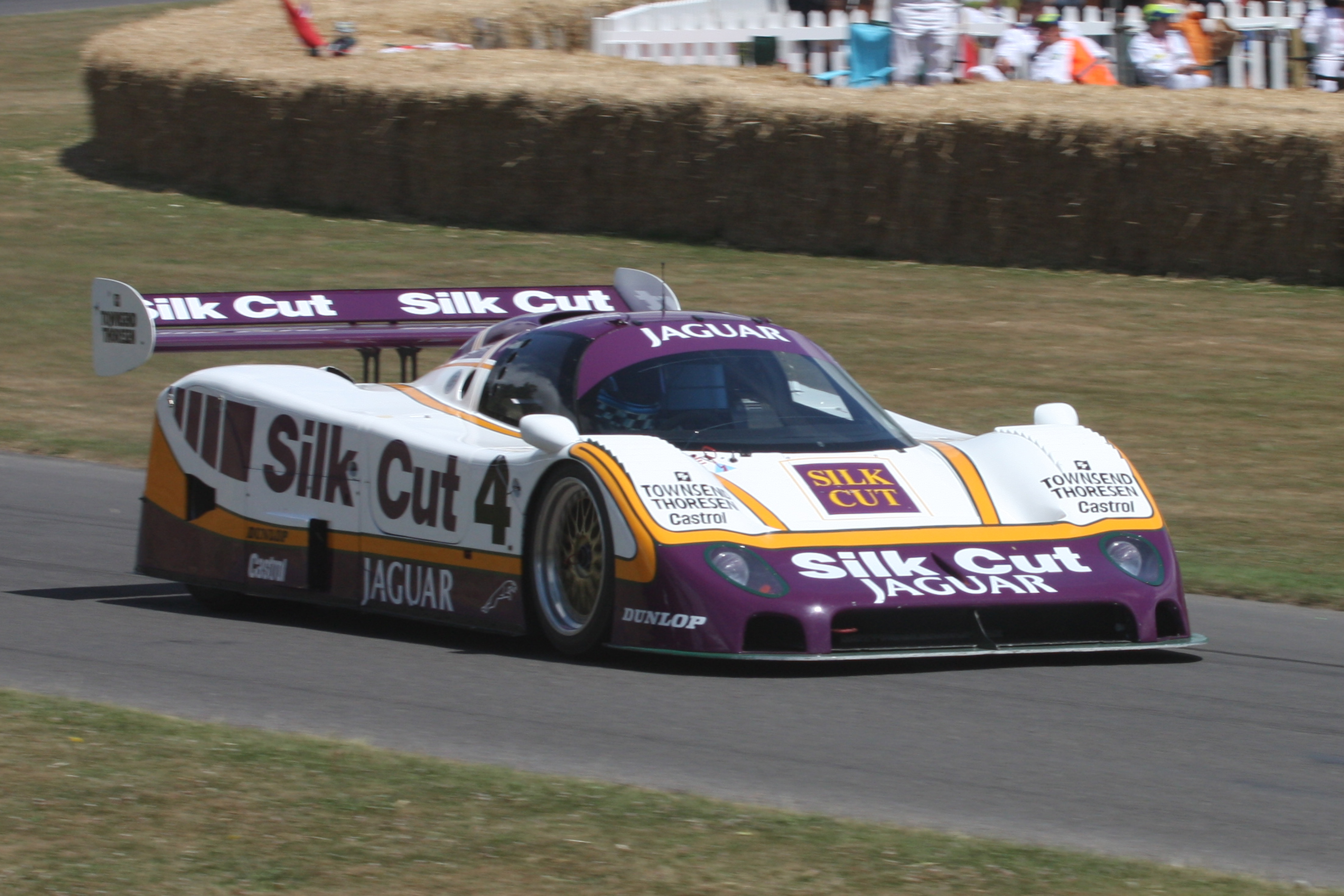
Jaguar XJR-8 at the 2009 Goodwood Festival Of Speed

The XJR-8 was similar to most of the previous XJR racers with one exception, the engine. Though it was what people believed to be a standard Jaguar V12 the displacement was increased to 7 litres and the power was cranked up to 720 horsepower (540 kW). Maximum speed was once recorded at over 220 mph (350 km/h) on the Mulsanne Straight at Circuit De La Sarthe. Its higher-pitched exhaust sound made it distinguishable from the lion-type roar of Porsche. It first appeared at the 1987 World Sports Prototype Championship. The XJR-8 won at Silverstone, Nürburgring, and Spa-Francorchamps, as well as taking 2nd place at Fuji. Jaguar won both the driver's title and the overall championship (8 total victories in 10 races) with Porsche and its vaunted 962 finishing 2nd. Three cars were prepared for competition at Le Mans, each with a low-drag configuration. Two out of the three cars failed to finish. The surviving car, which was in 2nd place at one point after 18 hours of racing, experienced gearbox trouble and finished 5th.

The XJR-8 raced for one year, that being 1987. In its only year of racing, it won Autosport Racing Car of the Year. Its design was advanced to produce the XJR-9, which was identical to its predecessor, in the following year. One of the surviving vehicles is on display at the Beaulieu Motor Museum.

== 24 Hours of Le Mans results ==
Year	Team	Drivers	Car #	Class	Laps	Pos.	Class Pos.
1987	(United Kingdom) Silk Cut Jaguar	(United States) Eddie Cheever (Brazil) Raul Boesel (Netherlands) Jan Lammers	4	C1	324	5th	5th
1987	(United Kingdom) Silk Cut Jaguar	(Netherlands) Jan Lammers (United Kingdom) John Watson (United Kingdom) Win Percy	5	C1	158	DNF	DNF
1987	(United Kingdom) Silk Cut Jaguar	(United Kingdom) Martin Brundle (Denmark) John Nielsen	6	C1	231	DNF	DNF

== See also ==
- Jaguar XJR Sportscars

Awards
Preceded by Williams FW11	Autosport; Racing Car Of The Year; 1987	Succeeded by McLaren MP4/4
