= Spice SE86C =

Sports prototype race car

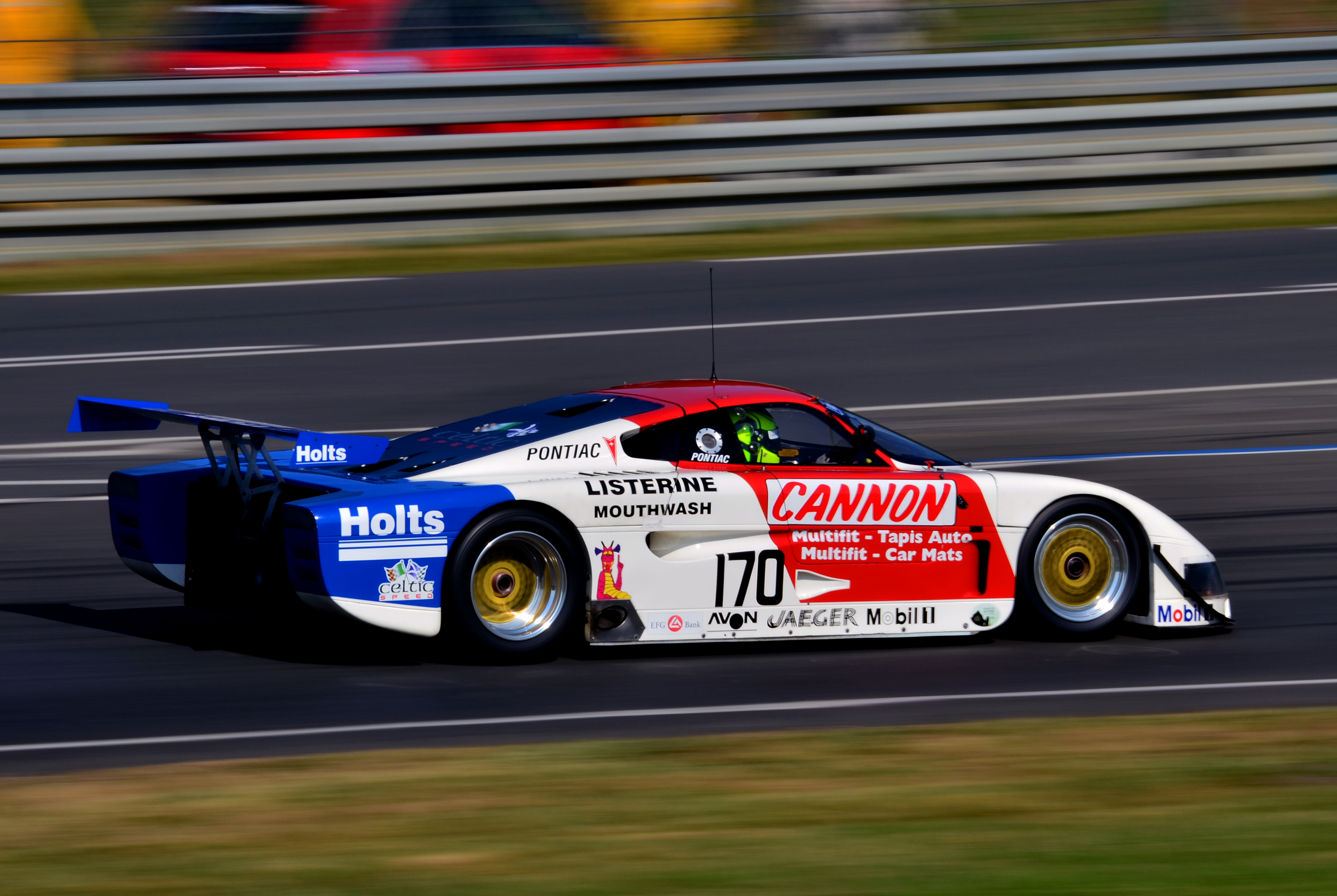
- Category: Group C2/IMSA GTP Lights
- Designer(s): Graham Humprhys, John Cafaro

Technical specifications
- Chassis: Aluminum honeycomb monocoque covered in carbon fiber composite and kevlar body
- Suspension (front): double wishbones, coil springs over shock absorbers, anti-roll bar
- Suspension (rear): double wishbones, rocker-actuated coil springs over shock absorbers, anti-roll bar
- Engine: Ford-Cosworth DFL 3.3 L (201.4 cu in) 90° V8 DOHC naturally-aspirated mid-engined Hart 418T 1.8 L (109.8 cu in) I4 DOHC turbocharged mid-engined Cosworth-tuned Pontiac Super Duty 3.0 L (183.1 cu in) I4 OHV naturally-aspirated mid-engined
- Transmission: Hewland DGB 5-speed manual
- Power: 350–600 hp (260–450 kW)
- Tires: Avon

Competition history

The Spice SE86C is a Group C2 and IMSA GTP Lights sports prototype race car, designed, developed, and built by British manufacturer, Spice Engineering, for sports car racing in the World Sportscar Championship and IMSA GT Championship, between 1986 and 1987.
