= Tiga Race Cars =

Racing car manufacturer

Tiga Race Cars Ltd. was a British auto racing constructor and team. The company was founded in 1974 by two former Formula 1 drivers, Australian Tim Schenken and New Zealander Howden Ganley. The company's name was formed by the first two letters of Tim and Ganley. Tiga constructed racing cars for various forms of open wheel racing and sports car racing, ranging from Formula Ford to the World Sportscar Championship. Their cars dominated the Sports 2000 class in the late 1970s and early 1980s.

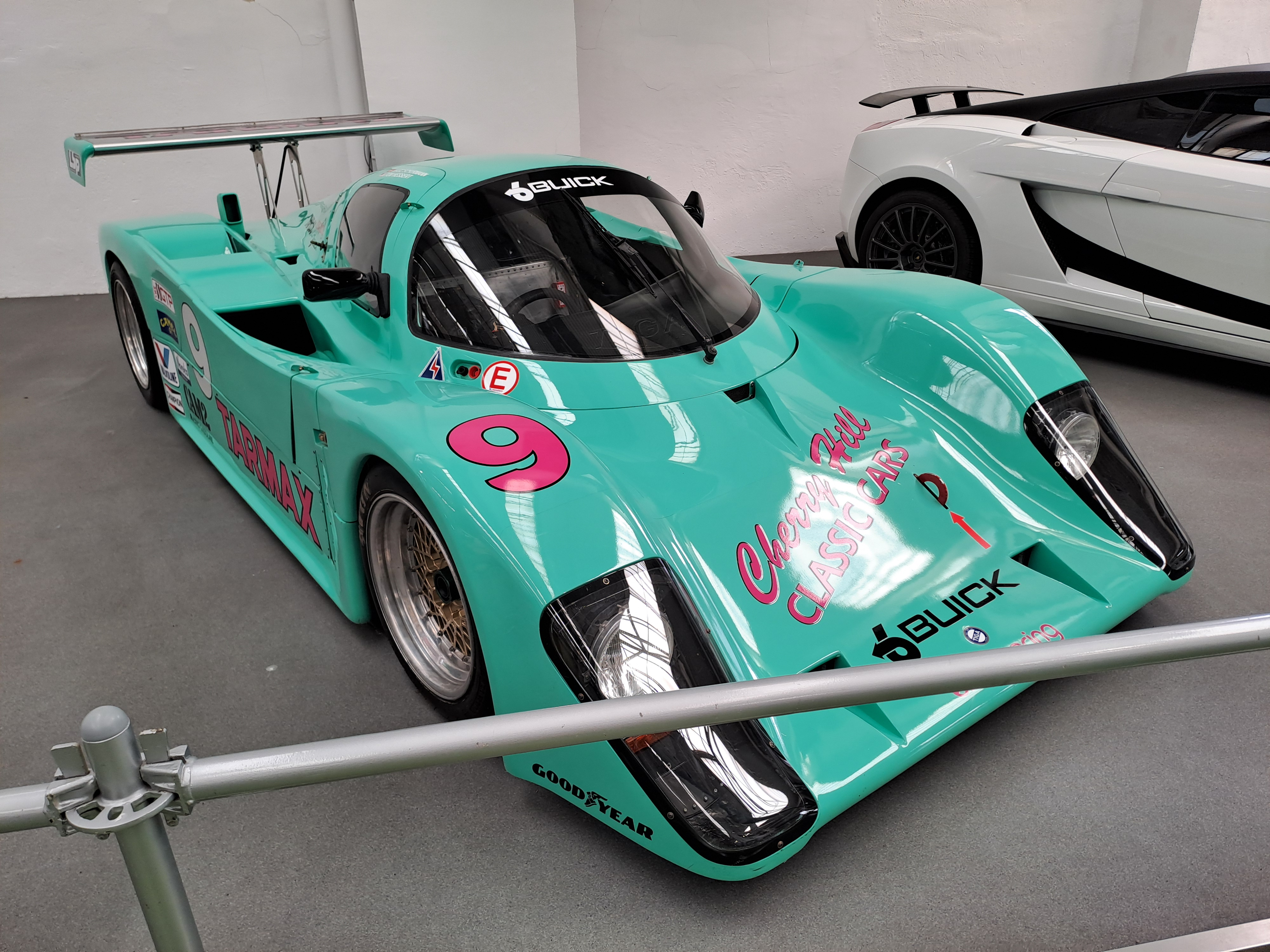
Tiga GT286

Over 400 chassis were sold by Tiga before the company folded in 1989.

Drivers of Tiga-built cars won numerous championships and events, including three European, four British and one American Sports 2000 championships and two Australian Drivers' Championships, as well as class wins at the 24 Hours of Le Mans and the 24 Hours of Daytona. Spice Engineering used a Spice-Tiga GC85 Ford to win the Group C2 Teams title in the 1985 World Endurance Championship and Tiga won the 1988 Camel Lights Championship for Manufacturers in the North American IMSA GT Championship.

The company and the rights to use the name of Tiga Race Cars were purchased from Mike Taylor by racing driver and businessman Mike Newton in 2012. His intent was to provide spare parts and restorations for the historic Tiga race cars built between 1974 and 1989, and to keep developing Tiga's ongoing projects in CN2 and other racing classes. The newly relaunched racing car manufacturer went on to develop a Speed Euroseries CN car, the Tiga CN012 for the 2012 season.

In 2013, Tiga bought the IP rights and all existing tooling and data of the Embassy Racing WF01 LMP2 sportscar, with the intention of modifying the car to comply with the revised cost-cap regulations of the then-current LMP2 class. The car's engine was changed over from its original Zytek V8 to the Judd Power HK. Tiga planned to offer the car for sale to potential customers in time for the 2014 season, but the car never raced.

== Tiga gallery ==
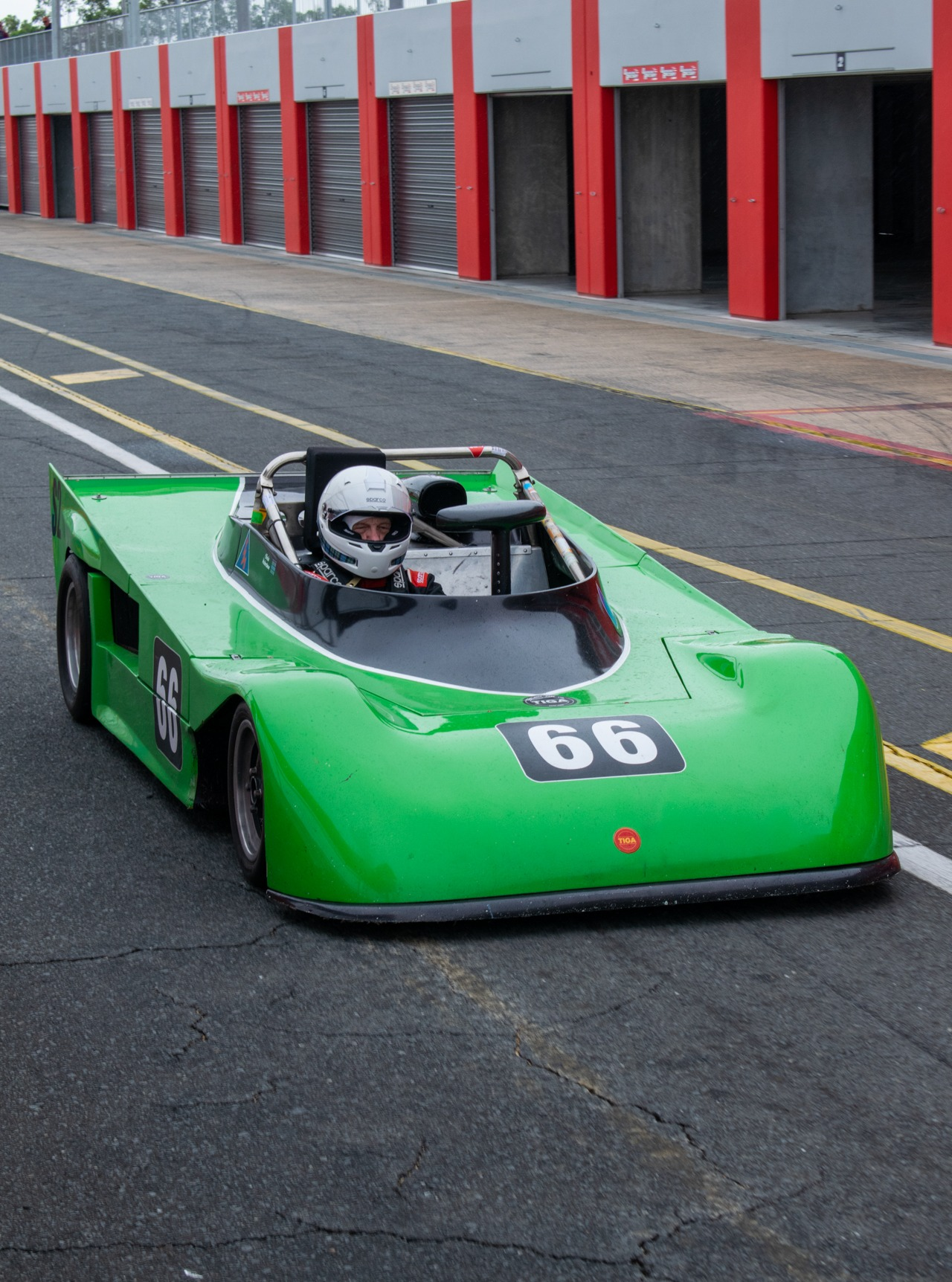
1981 Tiga SC-81 in the pits at Queensland Raceway

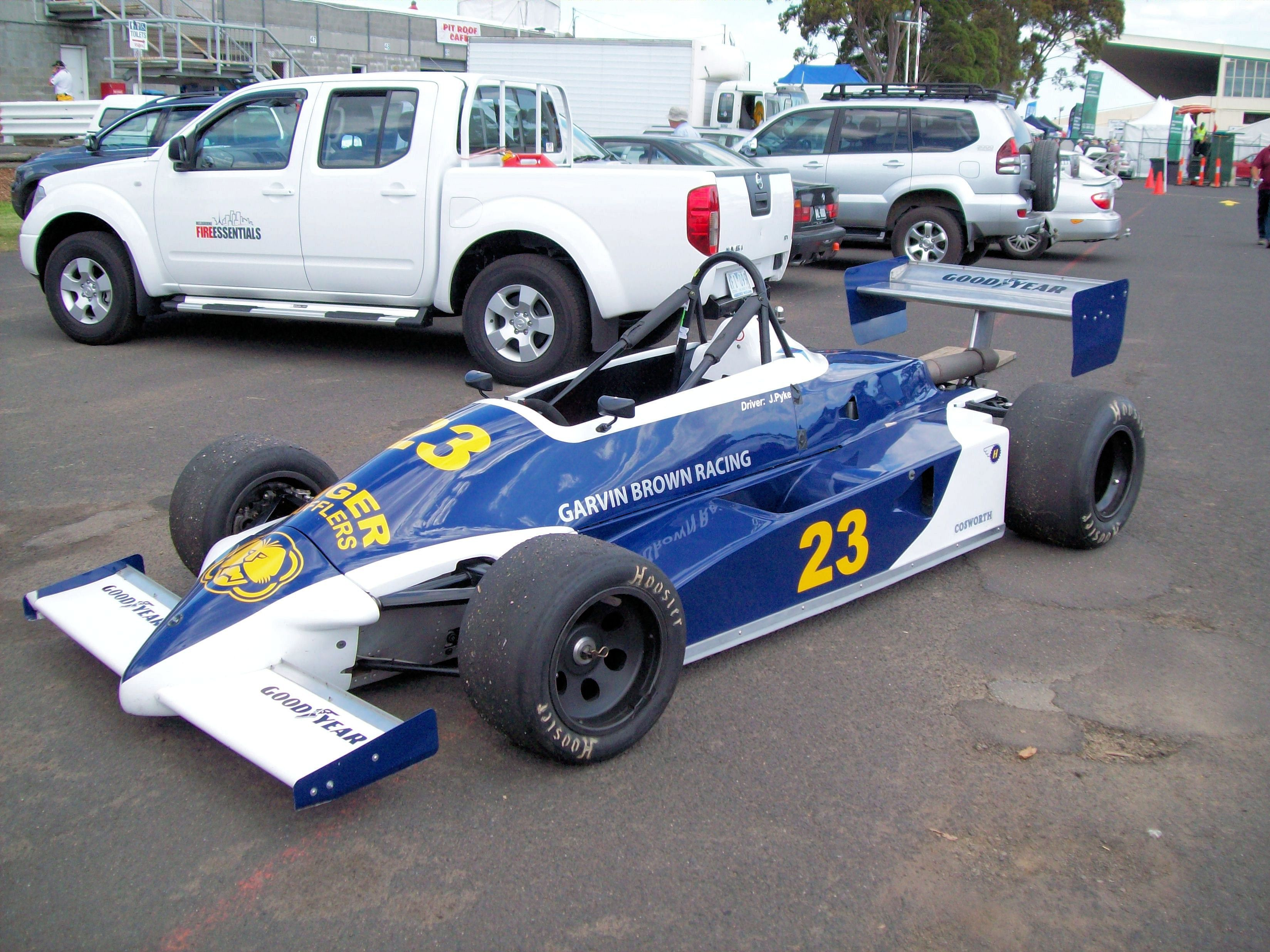
1982 Tiga FA82 Formula Pacific / Formula Mondial in the pits at the 2009 Historic Sandown

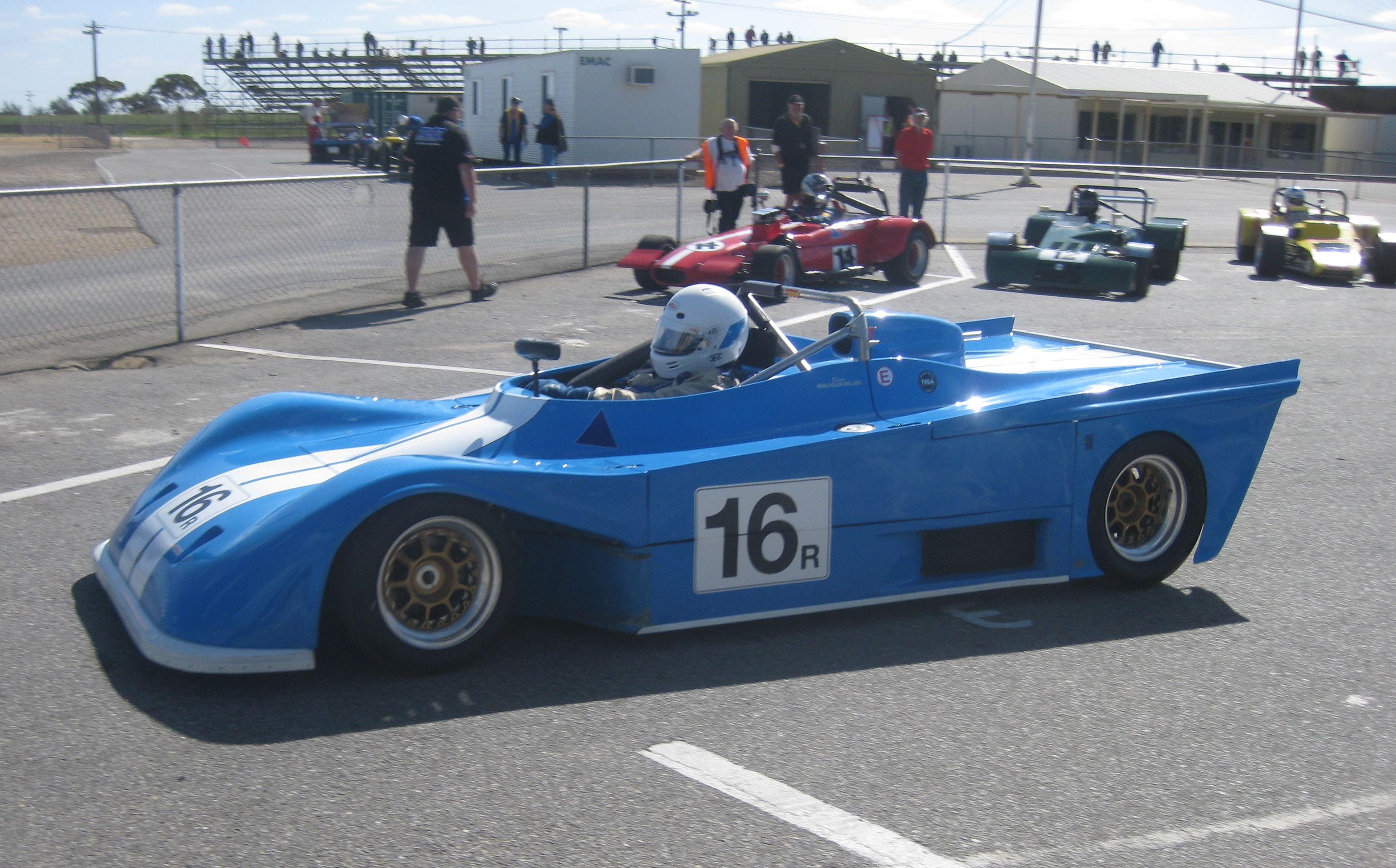
1983 Tiga SC83 Sports 2000 car

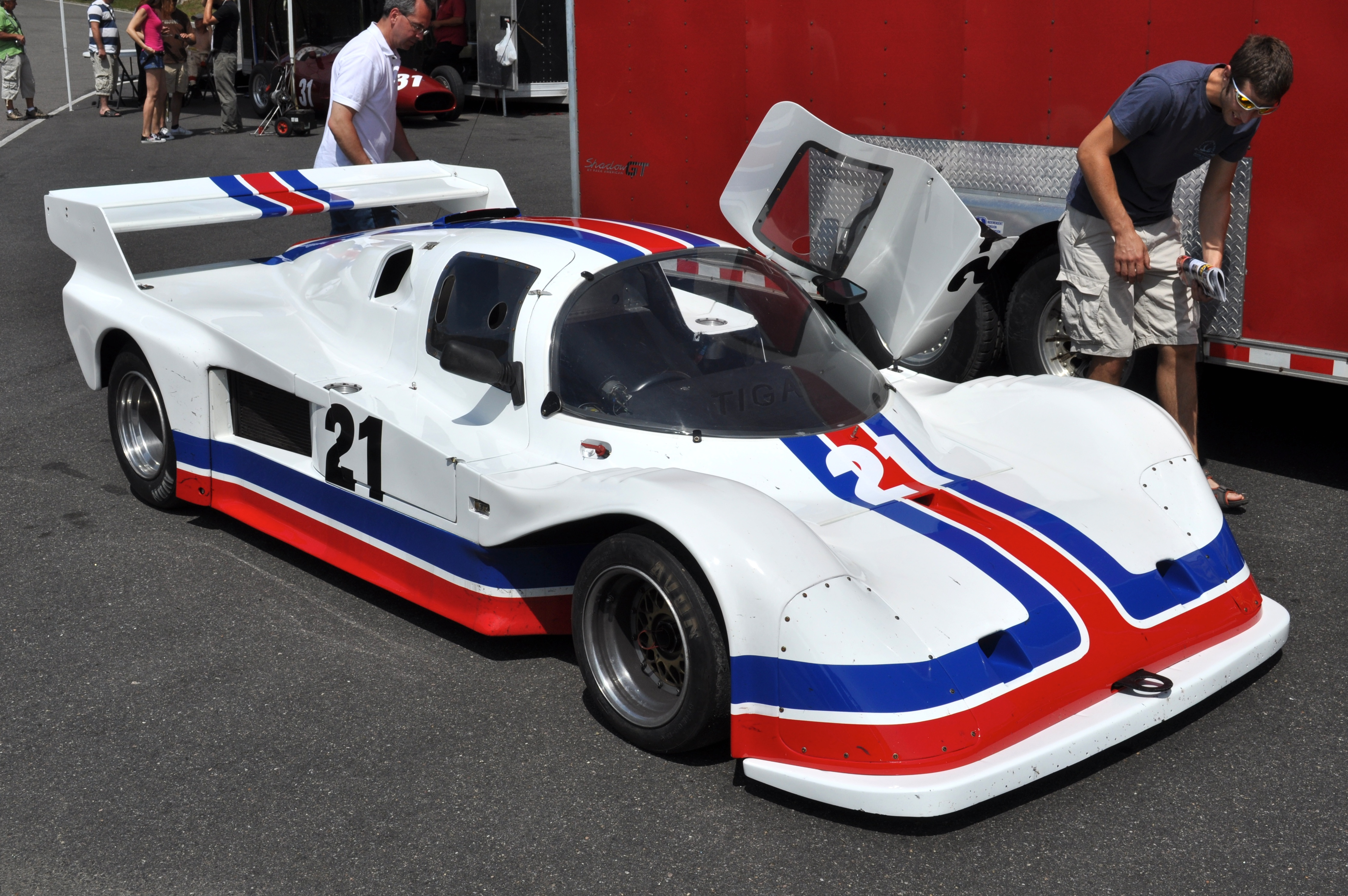
1985 Tiga GT285 IMSA GTP car
