= 1987 1000 km of Monza =

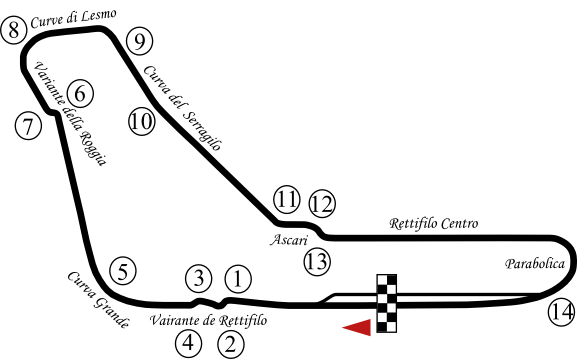
Layout of the Autodromo Nazionale di Monza (1976-1993)

The 1987 1000 km di Monza was the third round of the 1987 World Sports-Prototype Championship. It took place at the Autodromo Nazionale Monza, Italy on April 12, 1987.

== Official results ==
Class winners in bold. Cars failing to complete 75% of the winner's distance marked as Not Classified (NC).

Pos	Class	No	Team	Drivers	Chassis	Tyre	Laps
Pos	Class	No	Team	Drivers	Engine	Tyre	Laps
1	**C1**	**5**	**(United Kingdom) Silk Cut Jaguar**	**(Netherlands) Jan Lammers (United Kingdom) John Watson**	**Jaguar XJR-8**	**D**	**173**
1	**C1**	**5**	**(United Kingdom) Silk Cut Jaguar**	**(Netherlands) Jan Lammers (United Kingdom) John Watson**	**Jaguar 7.0L V12**	**D**	**173**
2	C1	17	(Germany) Rothmans Porsche	(Germany) Hans-Joachim Stuck (United Kingdom) Derek Bell	Porsche 962C	**D**	171
2	C1	17	(Germany) Rothmans Porsche	(Germany) Hans-Joachim Stuck (United Kingdom) Derek Bell	Porsche Type-935 3.0L Turbo Flat-6	**D**	171
3	C1	3	(Switzerland) Brun Motorsport	(Spain) Jesús Pareja (Argentina) Oscar Larrauri (Germany) Frank Jelinski	Porsche 962C	**MI**	168
3	C1	3	(Switzerland) Brun Motorsport	(Spain) Jesús Pareja (Argentina) Oscar Larrauri (Germany) Frank Jelinski	Porsche Type-935 2.8L Turbo Flat-6	**MI**	168
4	C1	8	(Germany) Joest Racing	(Germany) "John Winter" (Germany) Klaus Ludwig (Sweden) Stanley Dickens	Porsche 962C	**G**	167
4	C1	8	(Germany) Joest Racing	(Germany) "John Winter" (Germany) Klaus Ludwig (Sweden) Stanley Dickens	Porsche Type-935 2.8L Turbo Flat-6	**G**	167
5	C1	2	(Switzerland) Brun Motorsport	(Italy) Massimo Sigala (Italy) Gianfranco Brancatelli	Porsche 962C	**MI**	165
5	C1	2	(Switzerland) Brun Motorsport	(Italy) Massimo Sigala (Italy) Gianfranco Brancatelli	Porsche Type-935 2.8L Turbo Flat-6	**MI**	165
6	C1	18	(Germany) Rothmans Porsche	(Germany) Jochen Mass (France) Bob Wollek	Porsche 962C	**D**	159
6	C1	18	(Germany) Rothmans Porsche	(Germany) Jochen Mass (France) Bob Wollek	Porsche Type-935 3.0L Turbo Flat-6	**D**	159
7	**C2**	**111**	**(United Kingdom) Spice Engineering**	**(United Kingdom) Gordon Spice (Spain) Fermín Vélez**	**Spice SE86C**	**A**	**156**
7	**C2**	**111**	**(United Kingdom) Spice Engineering**	**(United Kingdom) Gordon Spice (Spain) Fermín Vélez**	**Ford Cosworth DFL 3.3L V8**	**A**	**156**
8	C2	101	(United Kingdom) Ecurie Ecosse	(United Kingdom) David Leslie (United Kingdom) Ray Mallock	Ecosse C286	**A**	156
8	C2	101	(United Kingdom) Ecurie Ecosse	(United Kingdom) David Leslie (United Kingdom) Ray Mallock	Ford Cosworth DFL 3.3L V8	**A**	156
9	C1	13	(France) Primagaz Competition	(France) Joël Gouhier (Belgium) Hervé Regout	Cougar C20	**MI**	142
9	C1	13	(France) Primagaz Competition	(France) Joël Gouhier (Belgium) Hervé Regout	Porsche Type-935 2.6L Turbo Flat-6	**MI**	142
10	C2	104	(Germany) URD Junior Team	(Germany) Rudi Seher (Germany) Hellmut Mundas (Germany) Deiter Heinzelmann	URD C81/2	**A**	142
10	C2	104	(Germany) URD Junior Team	(Germany) Rudi Seher (Germany) Hellmut Mundas (Germany) Deiter Heinzelmann	BMW M88 3.5L I6	**A**	142
11	C2	117	(Norway) Team Lucky Strike Schanche	(Norway) Martin Schanche (United Kingdom) Will Hoy	Argo JM19B	**A**	138
11	C2	117	(Norway) Team Lucky Strike Schanche	(Norway) Martin Schanche (United Kingdom) Will Hoy	Zakspeed 1.9L Turbo I4	**A**	138
12 NC	C2	116	(Italy) Technoracing	(Italy) Luigi Taverna (Italy) Oscar Berselli (Italy) Pasquale Barberio	Alba AR3	**A**	107
12 NC	C2	116	(Italy) Technoracing	(Italy) Luigi Taverna (Italy) Oscar Berselli (Italy) Pasquale Barberio	Ford Cosworth DFL 3.3L V8	**A**	107
13 DNF	C1	4	(United Kingdom) Silk Cut Jaguar	(Denmark) John Nielsen (Brazil) Raul Boesel	Jaguar XJR-8	**D**	167
13 DNF	C1	4	(United Kingdom) Silk Cut Jaguar	(Denmark) John Nielsen (Brazil) Raul Boesel	Jaguar 7.0L V12	**D**	167
14 DNF	C2	106	(Italy) Kelmar Racing	(Italy) Ranieri Randaccio (Italy) Maurizio Gellini (Italy) Vito Veninata	Tiga GC85	**A**	131
14 DNF	C2	106	(Italy) Kelmar Racing	(Italy) Ranieri Randaccio (Italy) Maurizio Gellini (Italy) Vito Veninata	Ford Cosworth DFL 3.3L V8	**A**	131
15 DNF	C2	130	(Italy) Alba Carma	(Italy) Martino Finotto (Italy) Pietro Silvo (Italy) Ruggero Melgrati	Alba AR3	?	123
15 DNF	C2	130	(Italy) Alba Carma	(Italy) Martino Finotto (Italy) Pietro Silvo (Italy) Ruggero Melgrati	Carma FF 1.9L Turbo I4	?	123
16 DNF	C1	7	(Germany) Joest Racing	(Germany) Klaus Ludwig (Italy) Piercarlo Ghinzani	Porsche 962C	**G**	88
16 DNF	C1	7	(Germany) Joest Racing	(Germany) Klaus Ludwig (Italy) Piercarlo Ghinzani	Porsche Type-935 2.8L Turbo Flat-6	**G**	88
17 DNF	C2	190	(United Kingdom) Roy Baker Racing	(United Kingdom) Val Musetti (France) Rudi Thomann	Tiga GC286	**A**	79
17 DNF	C2	190	(United Kingdom) Roy Baker Racing	(United Kingdom) Val Musetti (France) Rudi Thomann	Ford Cosworth DFL 3.3L V8	**A**	79
18 DNF	C2	123	(United Kingdom) Charles Ivey Racing	(United Kingdom) Dudley Wood (United Kingdom) Mark Newby	Tiga GC287	**A**	67
18 DNF	C2	123	(United Kingdom) Charles Ivey Racing	(United Kingdom) Dudley Wood (United Kingdom) Mark Newby	Porsche Type-935 2.6L Turbo Flat-6	**A**	67
19 DNF	C1	15	(United Kingdom) Britten – Lloyd Racing	(Italy) Mauro Baldi (Italy) Bruno Giacomelli	Porsche 962C GTi	**G**	65
19 DNF	C1	15	(United Kingdom) Britten – Lloyd Racing	(Italy) Mauro Baldi (Italy) Bruno Giacomelli	Porsche Type-935 2.8L Turbo Flat-6	**G**	65
20 DNF	C2	127	(United Kingdom) Chamberlain Engineering	(United Kingdom) Nick Adams (South Africa) Graham Duxbury (Greece) Costas Los	Spice SE86C	**A**	33
20 DNF	C2	127	(United Kingdom) Chamberlain Engineering	(United Kingdom) Nick Adams (South Africa) Graham Duxbury (Greece) Costas Los	Hart 418T 1.8L Turbo I4	**A**	33
21 DNF	C2	177	(France) Automobiles Louis Descartes	(France) Jacques Heuclin (France) Dominique Lacaud (France) Gérard Tremblay	ALD C2	**A**	30
21 DNF	C2	177	(France) Automobiles Louis Descartes	(France) Jacques Heuclin (France) Dominique Lacaud (France) Gérard Tremblay	BMW M88 3.5L I6	**A**	30
22 DNF	C2	114	Team Tiga Ford Denmark	(Denmark) Thorkild Thyrring (Sweden) Leif Lindström	Tiga GC287	**A**	19
22 DNF	C2	114	Team Tiga Ford Denmark	(Denmark) Thorkild Thyrring (Sweden) Leif Lindström	Ford Cosworth BDT-E 2.1L Turbo I4	**A**	19
23 DNF	C1	1	(Switzerland) Brun Motorsport	(Switzerland) Walter Brun (Argentina) Oscar Larrauri	Porsche 962C	**MI**	15
23 DNF	C1	1	(Switzerland) Brun Motorsport	(Switzerland) Walter Brun (Argentina) Oscar Larrauri	Porsche Type-935 2.8L Turbo Flat-6	**MI**	15
24 DNF	C2	181	(United Kingdom) Dune Motorsport	(United Kingdom) Duncan Bain (Australia) Neil Crang	Tiga GC287	**A**	0
24 DNF	C2	181	(United Kingdom) Dune Motorsport	(United Kingdom) Duncan Bain (Australia) Neil Crang	Rover V64V 3.0L V6	**A**	0

== Statistics ==
- Pole Position - #17 Rothmans Porsche - 1:32.170
- Fastest Lap - #5 Silk Cut Jaguar - 1:37.160
- Average Speed - 198.090 km/h

World Sportscar Championship
Previous race: 1987 1000 km of Jerez	1987 season	Next race: 1987 1000 km of Silverstone
