= 1987 World Sports Prototype Championship =

Racing tournament

1987 World Sportscar Championship

Seasons
- ← 1986 1988 →

The 1987 World Sportscar Championship season was the 35th season of FIA World Sportscar Championship racing. It featured the 1987 FIA World Sports Prototype Championship which was contested over a ten race series that commenced on 22 March and ended on 27 September. The championship was open to FIA Group C Sports Prototypes, FIA Group C2 Sports Prototypes and IMSA GTP cars. Raul Boesel won the Drivers Championship, Fermin Velez was awarded the FIA Cup for Group C2 Drivers, Silk Cut Jaguar won the Teams Championship and the FIA Cup for Group C2 Teams was awarded to Spice Engineering. Jaguar won 8 out of the 10 races and Porsche 2.

239 drivers started in at least 1 (one) Grand Prix in the 1987 FIA World Sports Prototype Championship.

== Schedule ==
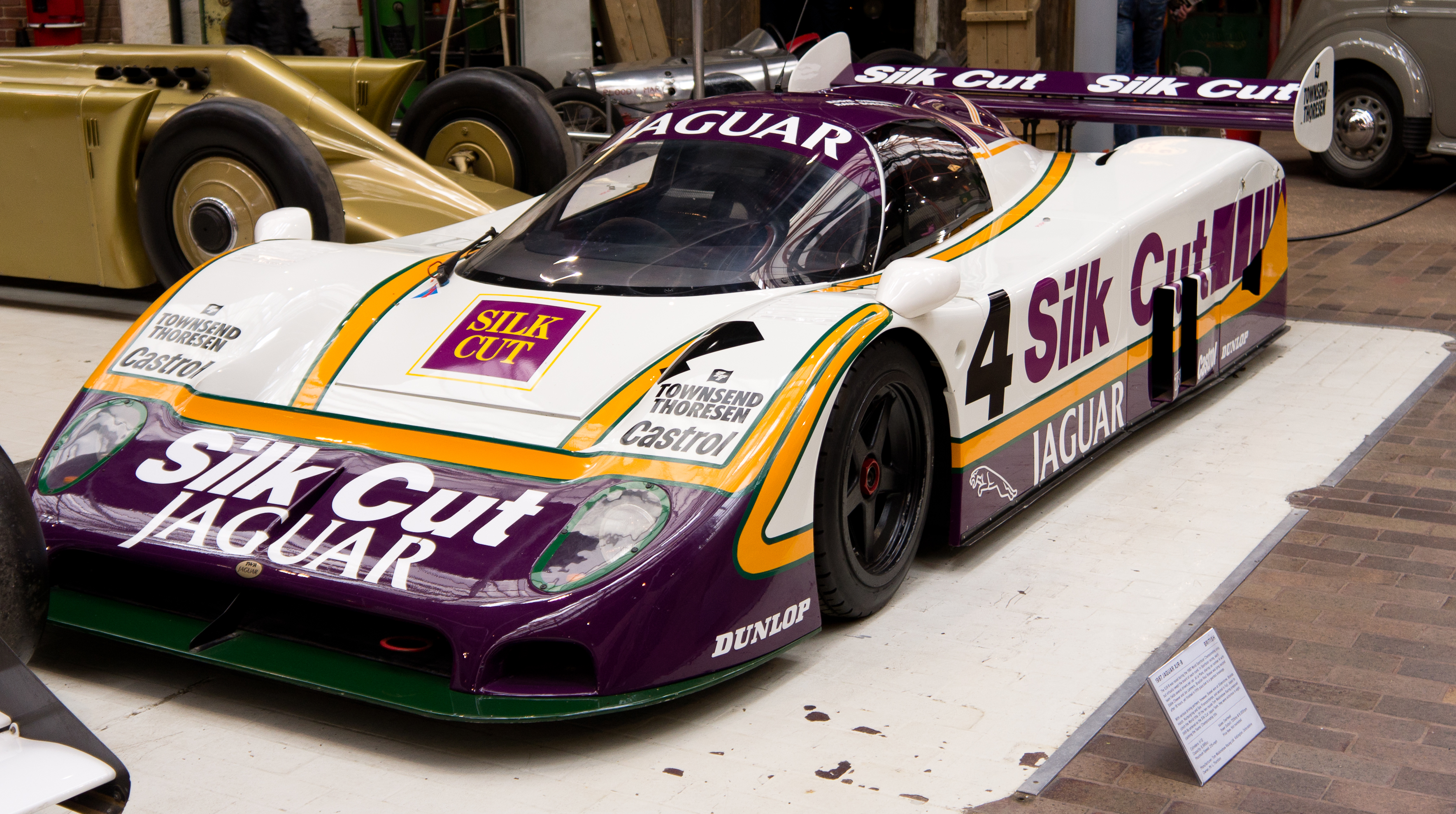
Silk Cut Jaguar won the Teams Championship with the Jaguar XJR-8.

Rnd	Race	Circuit	Date
1	(Spain) Grand Premio Fortuna (360 km)	Circuito Permanente Del Jarama	22 March
2	(Spain) 1000 km Jerez	Circuito Permanente de Jerez	29 March
3	(Italy) 1000km Monza	Autodromo Nazionale Monza	12 April
4	(United Kingdom) Autoglass 1000 Kilometres Silverstone	Silverstone Circuit	10 May
5	(France) 24 Hours of Le Mans	Circuit de la Sarthe	13 June; 14 June
6	(Germany) 200 Meilen von Nürnberg	Norisring	28 June
7	(United Kingdom) Shell Gemini 1000 Kilometres Brands Hatch	Brands Hatch	26 July
8	(Germany) International ADAC 1000km-Rennen	Nürburgring	30 August
9	(Belgium) Kouros 1000km Spa	Circuit de Spa-Francorchamps	13 September
10	(Japan) Mount Fuji 1000 Kilometres	Fuji Speedway	27 September

== Entries ==
=== Group C1 ===
Entrant	Car	Engine	Tyre	No.	Drivers	Rounds
(Switzerland) Brun Motorsport	Porsche 962C	Porsche Type-935/79 2.8 L Turbo Flat-6; Porsche Type-935/82 3.0 L Turbo Flat-6	M	1	(Switzerland) Walter Brun	1–4, 6–9
(Switzerland) Brun Motorsport	Porsche 962C	Porsche Type-935/79 2.8 L Turbo Flat-6; Porsche Type-935/82 3.0 L Turbo Flat-6	M	1	(West Germany) Frank Jelinski	1–2
(Switzerland) Brun Motorsport	Porsche 962C	Porsche Type-935/79 2.8 L Turbo Flat-6; Porsche Type-935/82 3.0 L Turbo Flat-6	M	1	(Argentina) Oscar Larrauri	3, 10
(Switzerland) Brun Motorsport	Porsche 962C	Porsche Type-935/79 2.8 L Turbo Flat-6; Porsche Type-935/82 3.0 L Turbo Flat-6	M	1	(Spain) Jésus Pareja	4, 6–7
(Switzerland) Brun Motorsport	Porsche 962C	Porsche Type-935/79 2.8 L Turbo Flat-6; Porsche Type-935/82 3.0 L Turbo Flat-6	M	1	(West Germany) Uwe Schäfer	4, 8
(Switzerland) Brun Motorsport	Porsche 962C	Porsche Type-935/79 2.8 L Turbo Flat-6; Porsche Type-935/82 3.0 L Turbo Flat-6	M	1	(France) Paul Belmondo	5
(Switzerland) Brun Motorsport	Porsche 962C	Porsche Type-935/79 2.8 L Turbo Flat-6; Porsche Type-935/82 3.0 L Turbo Flat-6	M	1	(France) Michel Trollé	5
(Switzerland) Brun Motorsport	Porsche 962C	Porsche Type-935/79 2.8 L Turbo Flat-6; Porsche Type-935/82 3.0 L Turbo Flat-6	M	1	(France) Pierre de Thoisy	5
(Switzerland) Brun Motorsport	Porsche 962C	Porsche Type-935/79 2.8 L Turbo Flat-6; Porsche Type-935/82 3.0 L Turbo Flat-6	M	1	(Italy) Massimo Sigala	9
(Switzerland) Brun Motorsport	Porsche 962C	Porsche Type-935/79 2.8 L Turbo Flat-6; Porsche Type-935/82 3.0 L Turbo Flat-6	M	1	(West Germany) Jochen Mass	10
(Switzerland) Brun Motorsport	Porsche 962C	Porsche Type-935/79 2.8 L Turbo Flat-6; Porsche Type-935/82 3.0 L Turbo Flat-6	M	2	(Italy) Massimo Sigala	1–4
(Switzerland) Brun Motorsport	Porsche 962C	Porsche Type-935/79 2.8 L Turbo Flat-6; Porsche Type-935/82 3.0 L Turbo Flat-6	M	2	(Italy) Gianfranco Brancatelli	1–3
(Switzerland) Brun Motorsport	Porsche 962C	Porsche Type-935/79 2.8 L Turbo Flat-6; Porsche Type-935/82 3.0 L Turbo Flat-6	M	2	(Argentina) Oscar Larrauri	4–9
(Switzerland) Brun Motorsport	Porsche 962C	Porsche Type-935/79 2.8 L Turbo Flat-6; Porsche Type-935/82 3.0 L Turbo Flat-6	M	2	(West Germany) Uwe Schäfer	5, 10
(Switzerland) Brun Motorsport	Porsche 962C	Porsche Type-935/79 2.8 L Turbo Flat-6; Porsche Type-935/82 3.0 L Turbo Flat-6	M	2	(Spain) Jésus Pareja	5, 10
(Switzerland) Brun Motorsport	Porsche 962C	Porsche Type-935/79 2.8 L Turbo Flat-6; Porsche Type-935/82 3.0 L Turbo Flat-6	M	2	(West Germany) Jochen Mass	6–9
(Switzerland) Brun Motorsport	Porsche 962C	Porsche Type-935/79 2.8 L Turbo Flat-6; Porsche Type-935/82 3.0 L Turbo Flat-6	M	2	(West Germany) Manuel Reuter	10
(Switzerland) Brun Motorsport	Porsche 962C	Porsche Type-935/79 2.8 L Turbo Flat-6; Porsche Type-935/82 3.0 L Turbo Flat-6	M	3	(Argentina) Oscar Larrauri	1–3, 6
(Switzerland) Brun Motorsport	Porsche 962C	Porsche Type-935/79 2.8 L Turbo Flat-6; Porsche Type-935/82 3.0 L Turbo Flat-6	M	3	(Spain) Jésus Pareja	1–3, 8–9
(Switzerland) Brun Motorsport	Porsche 962C	Porsche Type-935/79 2.8 L Turbo Flat-6; Porsche Type-935/82 3.0 L Turbo Flat-6	M	3	(Switzerland) Walter Brun	2
(Switzerland) Brun Motorsport	Porsche 962C	Porsche Type-935/79 2.8 L Turbo Flat-6; Porsche Type-935/82 3.0 L Turbo Flat-6	M	3	(West Germany) Frank Jelinski	3
(Switzerland) Brun Motorsport	Porsche 962C	Porsche Type-935/79 2.8 L Turbo Flat-6; Porsche Type-935/82 3.0 L Turbo Flat-6	M	3	(Canada) Bill Adam	5
(Switzerland) Brun Motorsport	Porsche 962C	Porsche Type-935/79 2.8 L Turbo Flat-6; Porsche Type-935/82 3.0 L Turbo Flat-6	M	3	(Canada) Scott Goodyear	5
(Switzerland) Brun Motorsport	Porsche 962C	Porsche Type-935/79 2.8 L Turbo Flat-6; Porsche Type-935/82 3.0 L Turbo Flat-6	M	3	(Canada) Richard Spenard	5
(Switzerland) Brun Motorsport	Porsche 962C	Porsche Type-935/79 2.8 L Turbo Flat-6; Porsche Type-935/82 3.0 L Turbo Flat-6	M	3	(West Germany) Jochen Mass	6
(Switzerland) Brun Motorsport	Porsche 962C	Porsche Type-935/79 2.8 L Turbo Flat-6; Porsche Type-935/82 3.0 L Turbo Flat-6	M	3	(Switzerland) Hans-Peter Kaufmann	8
(Switzerland) Brun Motorsport	Porsche 962C	Porsche Type-935/79 2.8 L Turbo Flat-6; Porsche Type-935/82 3.0 L Turbo Flat-6	M	3	(Switzerland) Franz Hunkeler	8
(Switzerland) Brun Motorsport	Porsche 962C	Porsche Type-935/79 2.8 L Turbo Flat-6; Porsche Type-935/82 3.0 L Turbo Flat-6	M	3	(West Germany) Uwe Schäfer	9
(United Kingdom) Silk Cut Jaguar	Jaguar XJR-8	Jaguar 7.0 L V12	D	4	(Brazil) Raul Boesel	All
(United Kingdom) Silk Cut Jaguar	Jaguar XJR-8	Jaguar 7.0 L V12	D	4	(United States) Eddie Cheever	1–2, 4–6, 8–9
(United Kingdom) Silk Cut Jaguar	Jaguar XJR-8	Jaguar 7.0 L V12	D	4	(Denmark) John Nielsen	2–3, 7, 9
(United Kingdom) Silk Cut Jaguar	Jaguar XJR-8	Jaguar 7.0 L V12	D	4	(Netherlands) Jan Lammers	5
(United Kingdom) Silk Cut Jaguar	Jaguar XJR-8	Jaguar 7.0 L V12	D	4	(United Kingdom) Johnny Dumfries	10
(United Kingdom) Silk Cut Jaguar	Jaguar XJR-8	Jaguar 7.0 L V12	D	5	(Netherlands) Jan Lammers	All
(United Kingdom) Silk Cut Jaguar	Jaguar XJR-8	Jaguar 7.0 L V12	D	5	(United Kingdom) John Watson	All
(United Kingdom) Silk Cut Jaguar	Jaguar XJR-8	Jaguar 7.0 L V12	D	5	(United Kingdom) Win Percy	5
(United Kingdom) Silk Cut Jaguar	Jaguar XJR-8	Jaguar 7.0 L V12	D	5	(Brazil) Raul Boesel	9
(United Kingdom) Silk Cut Jaguar	Jaguar XJR-8	Jaguar 7.0 L V12	D	6	(United Kingdom) Martin Brundle	4–5, 9
(United Kingdom) Silk Cut Jaguar	Jaguar XJR-8	Jaguar 7.0 L V12	D	6	(Denmark) John Nielsen	4–5
(United Kingdom) Silk Cut Jaguar	Jaguar XJR-8	Jaguar 7.0 L V12	D	6	(West Germany) Armin Hahne	5
(United Kingdom) Silk Cut Jaguar	Jaguar XJR-8	Jaguar 7.0 L V12	D	6	(United Kingdom) Johnny Dumfries	9
(United Kingdom) Silk Cut Jaguar	Jaguar XJR-8	Jaguar 7.0 L V12	D	6	(Brazil) Raul Boesel	9
(West Germany) Joest Racing (West Germany) Blaupunkt-Joest Racing	Porsche 962C	Porsche Type-935/79 2.8 L Turbo Flat-6; Porsche Type-935/82 3.0 L Turbo Flat-6	G	7	(West Germany) Klaus Ludwig	3, 6
(West Germany) Joest Racing (West Germany) Blaupunkt-Joest Racing	Porsche 962C	Porsche Type-935/79 2.8 L Turbo Flat-6; Porsche Type-935/82 3.0 L Turbo Flat-6	G	7	(Italy) Piercarlo Ghinzani	3
(West Germany) Joest Racing (West Germany) Blaupunkt-Joest Racing	Porsche 962C	Porsche Type-935/79 2.8 L Turbo Flat-6; Porsche Type-935/82 3.0 L Turbo Flat-6	G	7	(South Africa) Sarel van der Merwe	5
(West Germany) Joest Racing (West Germany) Blaupunkt-Joest Racing	Porsche 962C	Porsche Type-935/79 2.8 L Turbo Flat-6; Porsche Type-935/82 3.0 L Turbo Flat-6	G	7	(United States) Chip Robinson	5
(West Germany) Joest Racing (West Germany) Blaupunkt-Joest Racing	Porsche 962C	Porsche Type-935/79 2.8 L Turbo Flat-6; Porsche Type-935/82 3.0 L Turbo Flat-6	G	7	(United Kingdom) David Hobbs	5
(West Germany) Joest Racing (West Germany) Blaupunkt-Joest Racing	Porsche 962C	Porsche Type-935/79 2.8 L Turbo Flat-6; Porsche Type-935/82 3.0 L Turbo Flat-6	G	7	(France) Bob Wollek	6, 9–10
(West Germany) Joest Racing (West Germany) Blaupunkt-Joest Racing	Porsche 962C	Porsche Type-935/79 2.8 L Turbo Flat-6; Porsche Type-935/82 3.0 L Turbo Flat-6	G	7	(West Germany) Hans-Joachim Stuck	7–9
(West Germany) Joest Racing (West Germany) Blaupunkt-Joest Racing	Porsche 962C	Porsche Type-935/79 2.8 L Turbo Flat-6; Porsche Type-935/82 3.0 L Turbo Flat-6	G	7	(United Kingdom) Derek Bell	7–9
(West Germany) Joest Racing (West Germany) Blaupunkt-Joest Racing	Porsche 962C	Porsche Type-935/79 2.8 L Turbo Flat-6; Porsche Type-935/82 3.0 L Turbo Flat-6	G	7	(West Germany) Harald Grohs	10
(West Germany) Joest Racing (West Germany) Blaupunkt-Joest Racing	Porsche 962C	Porsche Type-935/79 2.8 L Turbo Flat-6; Porsche Type-935/82 3.0 L Turbo Flat-6	G	8	(Sweden) Stanley Dickens	3, 5–6, 8–10
(West Germany) Joest Racing (West Germany) Blaupunkt-Joest Racing	Porsche 962C	Porsche Type-935/79 2.8 L Turbo Flat-6; Porsche Type-935/82 3.0 L Turbo Flat-6	G	8	(West Germany) "John Winter"	3, 6, 8–10
(West Germany) Joest Racing (West Germany) Blaupunkt-Joest Racing	Porsche 962C	Porsche Type-935/79 2.8 L Turbo Flat-6; Porsche Type-935/82 3.0 L Turbo Flat-6	G	8	(West Germany) Klaus Ludwig	3
(West Germany) Joest Racing (West Germany) Blaupunkt-Joest Racing	Porsche 962C	Porsche Type-935/79 2.8 L Turbo Flat-6; Porsche Type-935/82 3.0 L Turbo Flat-6	G	8	(West Germany) Frank Jelinski	5, 8–10
(West Germany) Joest Racing (West Germany) Blaupunkt-Joest Racing	Porsche 962C	Porsche Type-935/79 2.8 L Turbo Flat-6; Porsche Type-935/82 3.0 L Turbo Flat-6	G	8	(United States) Hurley Haywood	5
(West Germany) Joest Racing (West Germany) Blaupunkt-Joest Racing	Porsche 962C	Porsche Type-935/79 2.8 L Turbo Flat-6; Porsche Type-935/82 3.0 L Turbo Flat-6	G	8	(South Africa) Sarel van der Merwe	5
(West Germany) Joest Racing (West Germany) Blaupunkt-Joest Racing	Porsche 962C	Porsche Type-935/79 2.8 L Turbo Flat-6; Porsche Type-935/82 3.0 L Turbo Flat-6	G	8	(France) Bob Wollek	9–10
(West Germany) Joest Racing (West Germany) Blaupunkt-Joest Racing	Porsche 962C	Porsche Type-935/79 2.8 L Turbo Flat-6; Porsche Type-935/82 3.0 L Turbo Flat-6	G	9	(West Germany) Klaus Ludwig	6, 8
(West Germany) Joest Racing (West Germany) Blaupunkt-Joest Racing	Porsche 962C	Porsche Type-935/79 2.8 L Turbo Flat-6; Porsche Type-935/82 3.0 L Turbo Flat-6	G	9	(West Germany) Frank Jelinski	6
(West Germany) Joest Racing (West Germany) Blaupunkt-Joest Racing	Porsche 962C	Porsche Type-935/79 2.8 L Turbo Flat-6; Porsche Type-935/82 3.0 L Turbo Flat-6	G	9	(South Africa) Sarel van der Merwe	6
(West Germany) Joest Racing (West Germany) Blaupunkt-Joest Racing	Porsche 962C	Porsche Type-935/79 2.8 L Turbo Flat-6; Porsche Type-935/82 3.0 L Turbo Flat-6	G	9	(France) Bob Wollek	8
(West Germany) Porsche Kremer Racing	Porsche 962C	Porsche Type-935/79 2.8 L Turbo Flat-6; Porsche Type-935/82 3.0 L Turbo Flat-6	Y	10	(West Germany) Volker Weidler	1–2, 4–9
(West Germany) Porsche Kremer Racing	Porsche 962C	Porsche Type-935/79 2.8 L Turbo Flat-6; Porsche Type-935/82 3.0 L Turbo Flat-6	Y	10	(Denmark) Kris Nissen	1–2, 4–9
(West Germany) Porsche Kremer Racing	Porsche 962C	Porsche Type-935/79 2.8 L Turbo Flat-6; Porsche Type-935/82 3.0 L Turbo Flat-6	Y	10	(Canada) Allen Berg	4
(West Germany) Porsche Kremer Racing	Porsche 962C	Porsche Type-935/79 2.8 L Turbo Flat-6; Porsche Type-935/82 3.0 L Turbo Flat-6	Y	10	(Japan) Kunimitsu Takahashi	5
(West Germany) Porsche Kremer Racing	Porsche 962C	Porsche Type-935/79 2.8 L Turbo Flat-6; Porsche Type-935/82 3.0 L Turbo Flat-6	Y	10	(Austria) Franz Konrad	10
(West Germany) Porsche Kremer Racing	Porsche 962C	Porsche Type-935/79 2.8 L Turbo Flat-6; Porsche Type-935/82 3.0 L Turbo Flat-6	Y	10	(South Africa) George Fouché	10
(West Germany) Porsche Kremer Racing	Porsche 962C	Porsche Type-935/79 2.8 L Turbo Flat-6; Porsche Type-935/82 3.0 L Turbo Flat-6	Y	11	(Spain) Emilio de Villota	1–2
(West Germany) Porsche Kremer Racing	Porsche 962C	Porsche Type-935/79 2.8 L Turbo Flat-6; Porsche Type-935/82 3.0 L Turbo Flat-6	Y	11	(Spain) Paco Romero	1–2
(West Germany) Porsche Kremer Racing	Porsche 962C	Porsche Type-935/79 2.8 L Turbo Flat-6; Porsche Type-935/82 3.0 L Turbo Flat-6	Y	11	(South Africa) George Fouché	5
(West Germany) Porsche Kremer Racing	Porsche 962C	Porsche Type-935/79 2.8 L Turbo Flat-6; Porsche Type-935/82 3.0 L Turbo Flat-6	Y	11	(South Africa) Wayne Taylor	5
(West Germany) Porsche Kremer Racing	Porsche 962C	Porsche Type-935/79 2.8 L Turbo Flat-6; Porsche Type-935/82 3.0 L Turbo Flat-6	Y	11	(Austria) Franz Konrad	5
(West Germany) Porsche Kremer Racing	Porsche 962C	Porsche Type-935/79 2.8 L Turbo Flat-6; Porsche Type-935/82 3.0 L Turbo Flat-6	Y	11	(West Germany) Volker Weidler	10
(West Germany) Porsche Kremer Racing	Porsche 962C	Porsche Type-935/79 2.8 L Turbo Flat-6; Porsche Type-935/82 3.0 L Turbo Flat-6	Y	11	(Denmark) Kris Nissen	10
(France) Primagaz Compétition	Cougar C20	Porsche Type-935/76 2.6 L Turbo Flat-6; Porsche Type-935/79 2.8 L Turbo Flat-6	M	13	(Belgium) Hervé Regout	3–5
(France) Primagaz Compétition	Cougar C20	Porsche Type-935/76 2.6 L Turbo Flat-6; Porsche Type-935/79 2.8 L Turbo Flat-6	M	13	(France) Joël Gouhier	3
(France) Primagaz Compétition	Cougar C20	Porsche Type-935/76 2.6 L Turbo Flat-6; Porsche Type-935/79 2.8 L Turbo Flat-6	M	13	(France) Yves Courage	4–5
(France) Primagaz Compétition	Cougar C20	Porsche Type-935/76 2.6 L Turbo Flat-6; Porsche Type-935/79 2.8 L Turbo Flat-6	M	13	(France) Pierre-Henri Raphanel	5
(Italy) Mussato Action Car	Lancia LC2/85	Ferrari 308C 3.0 L Turbo V8		14	(Austria) Franz Konrad	6
(Italy) Mussato Action Car	Lancia LC2/85	Ferrari 308C 3.0 L Turbo V8		14	(Italy) Bruno Giacomelli	6
(United Kingdom) Liqui Moly Equipe (United Kingdom) Britten-Lloyd Racing	Porsche 962C GTi	Porsche Type-935/79 2.8 L Turbo Flat-6	G	15	(Italy) Mauro Baldi	1–4, 6–10
(United Kingdom) Liqui Moly Equipe (United Kingdom) Britten-Lloyd Racing	Porsche 962C GTi	Porsche Type-935/79 2.8 L Turbo Flat-6	G	15	(United Kingdom) Jonathan Palmer	1–2, 4–6, 8–9
(United Kingdom) Liqui Moly Equipe (United Kingdom) Britten-Lloyd Racing	Porsche 962C GTi	Porsche Type-935/79 2.8 L Turbo Flat-6	G	15	(Italy) Bruno Giacomelli	3
(United Kingdom) Liqui Moly Equipe (United Kingdom) Britten-Lloyd Racing	Porsche 962C GTi	Porsche Type-935/79 2.8 L Turbo Flat-6	G	15	(United States) Price Cobb	5
(United Kingdom) Liqui Moly Equipe (United Kingdom) Britten-Lloyd Racing	Porsche 962C GTi	Porsche Type-935/79 2.8 L Turbo Flat-6	G	15	(United Kingdom) James Weaver	5
(United Kingdom) Liqui Moly Equipe (United Kingdom) Britten-Lloyd Racing	Porsche 962C GTi	Porsche Type-935/79 2.8 L Turbo Flat-6	G	15	(United Kingdom) Johnny Dumfries	7
(United Kingdom) Liqui Moly Equipe (United Kingdom) Britten-Lloyd Racing	Porsche 962C GTi	Porsche Type-935/79 2.8 L Turbo Flat-6	G	15	(New Zealand) Mike Thackwell	10
(West Germany) Porsche AG	Porsche 962C	Porsche Type-935/82 3.0 L Turbo Flat-6	D	17	(West Germany) Hans-Joachim Stuck	1–6
(West Germany) Porsche AG	Porsche 962C	Porsche Type-935/82 3.0 L Turbo Flat-6	D	17	(United Kingdom) Derek Bell	1–6
(West Germany) Porsche AG	Porsche 962C	Porsche Type-935/82 3.0 L Turbo Flat-6	D	17	(United States) Al Holbert	5
(West Germany) Porsche AG	Porsche 962C	Porsche Type-935/82 3.0 L Turbo Flat-6	D	18	(France) Bob Wollek	2–5
(West Germany) Porsche AG	Porsche 962C	Porsche Type-935/82 3.0 L Turbo Flat-6	D	18	(West Germany) Jochen Mass	2–5
(West Germany) Porsche AG	Porsche 962C	Porsche Type-935/82 3.0 L Turbo Flat-6	D	18	(Australia) Vern Schuppan	5
(West Germany) Porsche AG	Porsche 962C	Porsche Type-935/82 3.0 L Turbo Flat-6	D	19	(Australia) Vern Schuppan	5
(West Germany) Porsche AG	Porsche 962C	Porsche Type-935/82 3.0 L Turbo Flat-6	D	19	(Canada) Kees Nierop	5
(West Germany) Porsche AG	Porsche 962C	Porsche Type-935/82 3.0 L Turbo Flat-6	D	19	(United States) Price Cobb	5
(United Kingdom) Tiga Team	Tiga GC87	Ford Cosworth DFL 3.3 L Turbo V8	D	20	(United Kingdom) Tim Lee-Davey	8–10
(United Kingdom) Tiga Team	Tiga GC87	Ford Cosworth DFL 3.3 L Turbo V8	D	20	(Brazil) Chico Serra	8–9
(United Kingdom) Tiga Team	Tiga GC87	Ford Cosworth DFL 3.3 L Turbo V8	D	20	(United Kingdom) Evan Clements	8
(United Kingdom) Tiga Team	Tiga GC87	Ford Cosworth DFL 3.3 L Turbo V8	D	20	(United Kingdom) Val Musetti	9
(United Kingdom) Tiga Team	Tiga GC87	Ford Cosworth DFL 3.3 L Turbo V8	D	20	(Japan) Tetsuya Ota	10
(Japan) Nissan Motorsports	Nissan R87E	Nissan VEJ30 3.0 L Turbo V8	B	23	(Japan) Kazuyoshi Hoshino	5, 10
(Japan) Nissan Motorsports	Nissan R87E	Nissan VEJ30 3.0 L Turbo V8	B	23	(Japan) Kenji Takehashi	5, 10
(Japan) Nissan Motorsports	Nissan R87E	Nissan VEJ30 3.0 L Turbo V8	B	23	(Japan) Keiji Matsumoto	5
(Japan) Nissan Motorsports	Nissan R87E	Nissan VEJ30 3.0 L Turbo V8	B	23	(United Kingdom) Dave Scott	10
(Japan) Nissan Motorsports	Nissan R87E	Nissan VEJ30 3.0 L Turbo V8	B	32	(Japan) Masahiro Hasemi	5, 10
(Japan) Nissan Motorsports	Nissan R87E	Nissan VEJ30 3.0 L Turbo V8	B	32	(Japan) Aguri Suzuki	5, 10
(Japan) Nissan Motorsports	Nissan R87E	Nissan VEJ30 3.0 L Turbo V8	B	32	(Japan) Takao Wada	5
(Japan) Advan Alpha Nova	Porsche 962C	Porsche Type-935/79 3.0 L Turbo Flat-6	Y	25	(Japan) Kunimitsu Takahashi	10
(Japan) Advan Alpha Nova	Porsche 962C	Porsche Type-935/79 3.0 L Turbo Flat-6	Y	25	(Japan) Kazuo Mogi	10
(Japan) Advan Alpha Nova	Porsche 962C	Porsche Type-935/79 3.0 L Turbo Flat-6	Y	25	(United Kingdom) Kenny Acheson	10
(Japan) From A Racing	Porsche 962C	Porsche Type-935/79 3.0 L Turbo Flat-6	B	27	(Japan) Hideki Okada	10
(Japan) From A Racing	Porsche 962C	Porsche Type-935/79 3.0 L Turbo Flat-6	B	27	(Denmark) John Nielsen	10
(Japan) Person's Racing Team	Nissan R86V	Nissan VG30ET 3.0 L V6	Y	28	(Sweden) Anders Olofsson	10
(Japan) Person's Racing Team	Nissan R86V	Nissan VG30ET 3.0 L V6	Y	28	(Japan) Takao Wada	10
(Japan) Italya Sports	Nissan R86V	Nissan VG30ET 3.0 L V6	Y	29	(Sweden) Anders Olofsson	5
(Japan) Italya Sports	Nissan R86V	Nissan VG30ET 3.0 L V6	Y	29	(France) Alain Ferté	5
(Japan) Italya Sports	Nissan R86V	Nissan VG30ET 3.0 L V6	Y	29	(France) Patrick Gonin	5
(West Germany) Dauer Racing	Porsche 962C	Porsche Type-935/79 2.8 L Turbo Flat-6	G	31	(West Germany) Jochen Dauer	6, 8
(West Germany) Dauer Racing	Porsche 962C	Porsche Type-935/79 2.8 L Turbo Flat-6	G	31	(United Kingdom) Johnny Dumfries	6
(West Germany) Dauer Racing	Porsche 962C	Porsche Type-935/79 2.8 L Turbo Flat-6	G	31	(West Germany) Harald Grohs	8
(Austria) Walter Lechner Racing School	Porsche 962C	Porsche Type-935/79 2.8 L Turbo Flat-6		34	(Austria) Walter Lechner	6
(Austria) Walter Lechner Racing School	Porsche 962C	Porsche Type-935/79 2.8 L Turbo Flat-6		34	(Austria) Ernst Franzmaier	6
(Japan) Toyota Team Tom's	Toyota 87C	Toyota 3S-GTM 2.1 L Turbo I4	B	36	(Australia) Alan Jones	5, 10
(Japan) Toyota Team Tom's	Toyota 87C	Toyota 3S-GTM 2.1 L Turbo I4	B	36	(United Kingdom) Geoff Lees	5, 10
(Japan) Toyota Team Tom's	Toyota 87C	Toyota 3S-GTM 2.1 L Turbo I4	B	36	(Sweden) Eje Elgh	5
(Japan) Toyota Team Tom's	Toyota 87C	Toyota 3S-GTM 2.1 L Turbo I4	B	36	(Japan) Masanori Sekiya	10
(Japan) Toyota Team Tom's	Toyota 87C	Toyota 3S-GTM 2.1 L Turbo I4	B	37	(Japan) Masanori Sekiya	5, 10
(Japan) Toyota Team Tom's	Toyota 87C	Toyota 3S-GTM 2.1 L Turbo I4	B	37	(United Kingdom) Tiff Needell	5
(Japan) Toyota Team Tom's	Toyota 87C	Toyota 3S-GTM 2.1 L Turbo I4	B	37	(Japan) Kaoru Hoshino	5
(Japan) Toyota Team Tom's	Toyota 87C	Toyota 3S-GTM 2.1 L Turbo I4	B	37	(Japan) Nobuhide Tachi	10
(Japan) Dome Motorsport	Dome 87C	Toyota 3S-GTM 2.1 L Turbo I4	D	38	(United States) Ross Cheever	10
(Japan) Dome Motorsport	Dome 87C	Toyota 3S-GTM 2.1 L Turbo I4	D	38	(Sweden) Eje Elgh	10
(France) Graff Racing	Rondeau M482	Ford Cosworth DFL 3.3 L V8	G	40	(France) Jean-Philippe Grand	5
(France) Graff Racing	Rondeau M482	Ford Cosworth DFL 3.3 L V8	G	40	(France) Gaston Rahier	5
(France) Graff Racing	Rondeau M482	Ford Cosworth DFL 3.3 L V8	G	40	(France) Jacques Terrien	5
(France) Del Bello Racing	Sauber C8	Mercedes-Benz M117 5.0 L Turbo V8	G	42	(France) Gilles Lempereur	5, 7
(France) Del Bello Racing	Sauber C8	Mercedes-Benz M117 5.0 L Turbo V8	G	42	(Switzerland) Pierre-Alain Lombardi	5
(France) Del Bello Racing	Sauber C8	Mercedes-Benz M117 5.0 L Turbo V8	G	42	(France) Jacques Guillot	5
(France) Del Bello Racing	Sauber C8	Mercedes-Benz M117 5.0 L Turbo V8	G	42	(France) Jean-Pierre Jaussaud	7–8
(France) Del Bello Racing	Sauber C8	Mercedes-Benz M117 5.0 L Turbo V8	G	42	(France) Lucien Rossiaud	7–8
(France) Del Bello Racing	Sauber C8	Mercedes-Benz M117 5.0 L Turbo V8	G	42	(France) Noël del Bello	8
(Japan) Auto Beaurex Motorsport	Tom's 86C	Toyota 3S-GTM 2.1 L Turbo I4	D	45	(Japan) Kaoru Hoshino	10
(Japan) Auto Beaurex Motorsport	Tom's 86C	Toyota 3S-GTM 2.1 L Turbo I4	D	45	(United Kingdom) Will Hoy	10
(France) Secateva	WM P86	Peugeot ZNS4 2.9 L Turbo I4	M	51	(France) François Migault	5
(France) Secateva	WM P86	Peugeot ZNS4 2.9 L Turbo I4	M	51	(France) Pascal Pessiot	5
(France) Secateva	WM P86	Peugeot ZNS4 2.9 L Turbo I4	M	51	(France) Jean-Daniel Raulet	5
(France) Secateva	WM P87	Peugeot ZNS4 2.9 L Turbo I4	M	52	(France) Roger Dorchy	5
(France) Secateva	WM P87	Peugeot ZNS4 2.9 L Turbo I4	M	52	(France) Philippe Gache	5
(France) Secateva	WM P87	Peugeot ZNS4 2.9 L Turbo I4	M	52	(France) Dominique Delestre	5
(Japan) Alpha Cubic Racing Team renoma	Porsche 962C	Porsche Type-935/79 2.8 L Turbo Flat-6	B	55	(Japan) Naoki Nagasaka	10
(Japan) Alpha Cubic Racing Team renoma	Porsche 962C	Porsche Type-935/79 2.8 L Turbo Flat-6	B	55	(Japan) Chiyomi Totani	10
(Japan) Alpha Cubic Racing Team renoma	Porsche 962C	Porsche Type-935/79 2.8 L Turbo Flat-6	B	55	(Japan) Hitoshi Ogawa	10
(Switzerland) Kouros Racing (Switzerland) Formel Rennsportclub	Sauber C9	Mercedes-Benz M117 5.0 L Turbo V8	M	61	(New Zealand) Mike Thackwell	4–6, 8–9
(Switzerland) Kouros Racing (Switzerland) Formel Rennsportclub	Sauber C9	Mercedes-Benz M117 5.0 L Turbo V8	M	61	(France) Henri Pescarolo	4–5, 8
(Switzerland) Kouros Racing (Switzerland) Formel Rennsportclub	Sauber C9	Mercedes-Benz M117 5.0 L Turbo V8	M	61	(Japan) Hideki Okada	5
(Switzerland) Kouros Racing (Switzerland) Formel Rennsportclub	Sauber C9	Mercedes-Benz M117 5.0 L Turbo V8	M	61	(West Germany) Manuel Reuter	6
(Switzerland) Kouros Racing (Switzerland) Formel Rennsportclub	Sauber C9	Mercedes-Benz M117 5.0 L Turbo V8	M	61	(United Kingdom) Johnny Dumfries	8
(Switzerland) Kouros Racing (Switzerland) Formel Rennsportclub	Sauber C9	Mercedes-Benz M117 5.0 L Turbo V8	M	61	(France) Jean-Louis Schlesser	9
(Switzerland) Kouros Racing (Switzerland) Formel Rennsportclub	Sauber C9	Mercedes-Benz M117 5.0 L Turbo V8	M	62	(United Kingdom) Johnny Dumfries	5, 8
(Switzerland) Kouros Racing (Switzerland) Formel Rennsportclub	Sauber C9	Mercedes-Benz M117 5.0 L Turbo V8	M	62	(United States) Chip Ganassi	5
(Switzerland) Kouros Racing (Switzerland) Formel Rennsportclub	Sauber C9	Mercedes-Benz M117 5.0 L Turbo V8	M	62	(New Zealand) Mike Thackwell	5
(Switzerland) Kouros Racing (Switzerland) Formel Rennsportclub	Sauber C9	Mercedes-Benz M117 5.0 L Turbo V8	M	62	(West Germany) Manuel Reuter	8
(France) Primagaz Compétition	Porsche 962C	Porsche Type-935/79 2.8 L Turbo Flat-6	G	72	(West Germany) Jürgen Lässig	5–6, 8–9
(France) Primagaz Compétition	Porsche 962C	Porsche Type-935/79 2.8 L Turbo Flat-6	G	72	(France) Pierre Yver	5–6, 9
(France) Primagaz Compétition	Porsche 962C	Porsche Type-935/79 2.8 L Turbo Flat-6	G	72	(Belgium) Bernard de Dryver	5, 8–9
(France) Primagaz Compétition	Porsche 962C	Porsche Type-935/79 2.8 L Turbo Flat-6	G	72	(France) Cathy Muller	8
(Japan) Best House Racing Team	LM 07	Toyota 3S-GTM 2.1 L Turbo I4	Y	77	(Japan) Osamu Nakako	10
(Japan) Best House Racing Team	LM 07	Toyota 3S-GTM 2.1 L Turbo I4	Y	77	(Brazil) Maurizio Sandro Sala	10
(Australia) Rothmans Porsche Team Schuppan	Porsche 962C	Porsche Type-935/82 3.0 L Turbo Flat-6	D	99	(Australia) Geoff Brabham	10
(Australia) Rothmans Porsche Team Schuppan	Porsche 962C	Porsche Type-935/82 3.0 L Turbo Flat-6	D	99	(United Kingdom) Derek Bell	10
(Japan) Trust Racing Team	Porsche 962C	Porsche Type-935/82 3.0 L Turbo Flat-6	D	100	(Australia) Vern Schuppan	10
(Japan) Trust Racing Team	Porsche 962C	Porsche Type-935/82 3.0 L Turbo Flat-6	D	100	(United Kingdom) James Weaver	10
(Japan) Trust Racing Team	Porsche 962C	Porsche Type-935/82 3.0 L Turbo Flat-6	D	100	(Japan) Keiichi Suzuki	10

=== Group C2 ===
Entrant	Car	Engine	Tyre	No.	Drivers	Rounds
(United Kingdom) Swiftair Ecurie Ecosse	Ecosse C286	Ford Cosworth DFL 3.3 L V8	A	101	(United Kingdom) David Leslie	1–3
(United Kingdom) Swiftair Ecurie Ecosse	Ecosse C286	Ford Cosworth DFL 3.3 L V8	A	101	(United Kingdom) Ray Mallock	1–3
(United Kingdom) Swiftair Ecurie Ecosse	Ecosse C286	Ford Cosworth DFL 3.3 L V8	A	101	(United Kingdom) Mike Wilds	4–10
(United Kingdom) Swiftair Ecurie Ecosse	Ecosse C286	Ford Cosworth DFL 3.3 L V8	A	101	(United Kingdom) Johnny Dumfries	4
(United Kingdom) Swiftair Ecurie Ecosse	Ecosse C286	Ford Cosworth DFL 3.3 L V8	A	101	(United States) Andy Petery	5
(United Kingdom) Swiftair Ecurie Ecosse	Ecosse C286	Ford Cosworth DFL 3.3 L V8	A	101	(United States) Les Delano	5
(United Kingdom) Swiftair Ecurie Ecosse	Ecosse C286	Ford Cosworth DFL 3.3 L V8	A	101	(United Kingdom) Win Percy	6, 8
(United Kingdom) Swiftair Ecurie Ecosse	Ecosse C286	Ford Cosworth DFL 3.3 L V8	A	101	(Belgium) Marc Duez	7, 9–10
(United Kingdom) Swiftair Ecurie Ecosse	Ecosse C286	Ford Cosworth DFL 3.3 L V8	A	102	(United Kingdom) Ray Mallock	4–10
(United Kingdom) Swiftair Ecurie Ecosse	Ecosse C286	Ford Cosworth DFL 3.3 L V8	A	102	(United Kingdom) David Leslie	4–10
(United Kingdom) Swiftair Ecurie Ecosse	Ecosse C286	Ford Cosworth DFL 3.3 L V8	A	102	(Belgium) Marc Duez	5
(United Kingdom) John Bartlett Racing with Goodmans Sound	Bardon DB2	Ford Cosworth DFL 3.3 L V8	A	103	(Sweden) Kenneth Leim	2, 4
(United Kingdom) John Bartlett Racing with Goodmans Sound	Bardon DB2	Ford Cosworth DFL 3.3 L V8	A	103	(United Kingdom) Val Musetti	2, 4
(United Kingdom) John Bartlett Racing with Goodmans Sound	Bardon DB2	Ford Cosworth DFL 3.3 L V8	A	103	(Morocco) Max Cohen-Olivar	2
(United Kingdom) John Bartlett Racing with Goodmans Sound	Bardon DB2	Ford Cosworth DFL 3.3 L V8	A	103	(United Kingdom) John Bartlett	4, 6, 9
(United Kingdom) John Bartlett Racing with Goodmans Sound	Bardon DB2	Ford Cosworth DFL 3.3 L V8	A	103	(United Kingdom) Robin Donovan	5
(United Kingdom) John Bartlett Racing with Goodmans Sound	Bardon DB2	Ford Cosworth DFL 3.3 L V8	A	103	(United Kingdom) Tim Lee-Davey	5
(United Kingdom) John Bartlett Racing with Goodmans Sound	Bardon DB2	Ford Cosworth DFL 3.3 L V8	A	103	(France) Raymond Boutinaud	5
(United Kingdom) John Bartlett Racing with Goodmans Sound	Bardon DB2	Ford Cosworth DFL 3.3 L V8	A	103	(New Zealand) Rob Wilson	6
(United Kingdom) John Bartlett Racing with Goodmans Sound	Bardon DB2	Ford Cosworth DFL 3.3 L V8	A	103	(Italy) Giovanni Lavaggi	9
(United Kingdom) John Bartlett Racing with Goodmans Sound	Bardon DB2	Ford Cosworth DFL 3.3 L V8	A	103	(United Kingdom) Tom Waring	9
(West Germany) URD Junior Team	URD C81/2	BMW M88 3.5 L I6	A	104	(West Germany) Hellmut Mundas	1–4, 6–8, 10
(West Germany) URD Junior Team	URD C81/2	BMW M88 3.5 L I6	A	104	(West Germany) Rudi Seher	1–4, 6–8
(West Germany) URD Junior Team	URD C81/2	BMW M88 3.5 L I6	A	104	(West Germany) Dieter Heinzelmann	2–3
(West Germany) URD Junior Team	URD C81/2	BMW M88 3.5 L I6	A	104	(France) Rudi Thomann	4
(West Germany) URD Junior Team	URD C81/2	BMW M88 3.5 L I6	A	104	(United Kingdom) Sean Walker	7
(West Germany) URD Junior Team	URD C81/2	BMW M88 3.5 L I6	A	104	(United Kingdom) Robin Smith	10
(Italy) Kelmar Racing	Tiga GC85	Ford Cosworth DFL 3.3 L V8	A	106	(Italy) Ranieri Randaccio	2–4, 6–8
(Italy) Kelmar Racing	Tiga GC85	Ford Cosworth DFL 3.3 L V8	A	106	(Italy) Maurizio Gellini	2–4, 6–7
(Italy) Kelmar Racing	Tiga GC85	Ford Cosworth DFL 3.3 L V8	A	106	(Italy) Vito Veninata	2–3, 8–9
(Italy) Kelmar Racing	Tiga GC85	Ford Cosworth DFL 3.3 L V8	A	106	(Italy) Pasquale Barberio	4, 7–9
(France) Roland Bassaler	Sauber SHS C6	BMW M88 3.5 L I6	A	108	(France) Jean-François Yvon	5
(France) Roland Bassaler	Sauber SHS C6	BMW M88 3.5 L I6	A	108	(France) Herve Bourjade	5
(France) Roland Bassaler	Sauber SHS C6	BMW M88 3.5 L I6	A	108	(France) Yves Harvalet	5
(United Kingdom) Spice Engineering	Spice SE86C; Spice SE87C	Ford Cosworth DFL 3.3 L V8	A	111	(United Kingdom) Gordon Spice	All
(United Kingdom) Spice Engineering	Spice SE86C; Spice SE87C	Ford Cosworth DFL 3.3 L V8	A	111	(Spain) Fermín Vélez	All
(United Kingdom) Spice Engineering	Spice SE86C; Spice SE87C	Ford Cosworth DFL 3.3 L V8	A	111	(France) Philippe de Henning	5
(United Kingdom) Spice Engineering	Spice SE86C; Spice SE87C	Ford Cosworth DFL 3.3 L V8	A	112	(United Kingdom) Ray Bellm	6
(United Kingdom) Spice Engineering	Spice SE86C; Spice SE87C	Ford Cosworth DFL 3.3 L V8	A	112	(United Kingdom) Nick Adams	6
(France) José Thibault	Chevron B36	Talbot 3.0 L V6	A	113	(France) José Thibault	5
(France) José Thibault	Chevron B36	Talbot 3.0 L V6	A	113	(France) André Heinrich	5
(France) José Thibault	Chevron B36	Talbot 3.0 L V6	A	113	(France) Lionel Née	5
Team Tiga Ford Denmark	Tiga GC287	Ford Cosworth BDT-E 1.8 L Turbo I4	A	114	(Denmark) Thorkild Thyrring	1–3, 5–10
Team Tiga Ford Denmark	Tiga GC287	Ford Cosworth BDT-E 1.8 L Turbo I4	A	114	(Sweden) Leif Lindström	1–3
Team Tiga Ford Denmark	Tiga GC287	Ford Cosworth BDT-E 1.8 L Turbo I4	A	114	(United Kingdom) John Sheldon	5–6
Team Tiga Ford Denmark	Tiga GC287	Ford Cosworth BDT-E 1.8 L Turbo I4	A	114	(United Kingdom) Ian Harrower	5
Team Tiga Ford Denmark	Tiga GC287	Ford Cosworth BDT-E 1.8 L Turbo I4	A	114	(United Kingdom) Val Musetti	7
Team Tiga Ford Denmark	Tiga GC287	Ford Cosworth BDT-E 1.8 L Turbo I4	A	114	(Denmark) Peter Elgaard	8–10
(United Kingdom) ADA Engineering	Gebhardt JC843	Ford Cosworth DFL 3.3 L V8	A	115	(United Kingdom) Ian Harrower	1–2, 7
(United Kingdom) ADA Engineering	Gebhardt JC843	Ford Cosworth DFL 3.3 L V8	A	115	(United Kingdom) Mike Wilds	1–2
(United Kingdom) ADA Engineering	Gebhardt JC843	Ford Cosworth DFL 3.3 L V8	A	115	(United Kingdom) Tiff Needell	7
(Italy) Techno Racing	Alba AR3	Ford Cosworth DFL 3.3 L V8	A	116	(Italy) Luigi Taverna	1–3, 5, 7
(Italy) Techno Racing	Alba AR3	Ford Cosworth DFL 3.3 L V8	A	116	(Switzerland) Jean-Pierre Frey	1–2, 7
(Italy) Techno Racing	Alba AR3	Ford Cosworth DFL 3.3 L V8	A	116	(Italy) Oscar Berselli	2–3
(Italy) Techno Racing	Alba AR3	Ford Cosworth DFL 3.3 L V8	A	116	(Italy) Pasquale Barberio	3
(Italy) Techno Racing	Alba AR3	Ford Cosworth DFL 3.3 L V8	A	116	(France) Patrick Trucco	5
(Italy) Techno Racing	Alba AR3	Ford Cosworth DFL 3.3 L V8	A	116	(United Kingdom) Evan Clements	5
(Italy) Techno Racing	Alba AR3	Ford Cosworth DFL 3.3 L V8	A	116	(Italy) Giovanni Lavaggi	7
(Norway) Team Lucky Strike Schanche	Argo JM19B	Zakspeed 1.9 L Turbo I4	G	117	(Norway) Martin Schanche	1–9
(Norway) Team Lucky Strike Schanche	Argo JM19B	Zakspeed 1.9 L Turbo I4	G	117	(United Kingdom) Will Hoy	1–9
(Norway) Team Lucky Strike Schanche	Argo JM19B	Zakspeed 1.9 L Turbo I4	G	117	(United Kingdom) Robin Smith	5
(United Kingdom) Olindo Iacobelli (United Kingdom) Chamberlain Engineering	Royale RP40; Spice SE86C	Ford Cosworth DFL 3.3 L V8	A	118	(France) Jean-Louis Ricci	5, 7–10
(United Kingdom) Olindo Iacobelli (United Kingdom) Chamberlain Engineering	Royale RP40; Spice SE86C	Ford Cosworth DFL 3.3 L V8	A	118	(United States) Olindo Iacobelli	5, 7–8, 10
(United Kingdom) Olindo Iacobelli (United Kingdom) Chamberlain Engineering	Royale RP40; Spice SE86C	Ford Cosworth DFL 3.3 L V8	A	118	(France) Georges Tessier	5, 8–9
(United Kingdom) Olindo Iacobelli (United Kingdom) Chamberlain Engineering	Royale RP40; Spice SE86C	Ford Cosworth DFL 3.3 L V8	A	118	(New Zealand) John Nicholson	7
(United Kingdom) Olindo Iacobelli (United Kingdom) Chamberlain Engineering	Royale RP40; Spice SE86C	Ford Cosworth DFL 3.3 L V8	A	118	(France) Gerard Cardinaud	9
(United Kingdom) Chamberlain Engineering	Spice SE86C	Hart 418T 1.9 L Turbo I4	A	127	(United Kingdom) Nick Adams	3–5, 7–9
(United Kingdom) Chamberlain Engineering	Spice SE86C	Hart 418T 1.9 L Turbo I4	A	127	(South Africa) Graham Duxbury	3–5, 10
(United Kingdom) Chamberlain Engineering	Spice SE86C	Hart 418T 1.9 L Turbo I4	A	127	(Greece) Costas Los	3
(United Kingdom) Chamberlain Engineering	Spice SE86C	Hart 418T 1.9 L Turbo I4	A	127	(United Kingdom) Richard Jones	5
(United Kingdom) Chamberlain Engineering	Spice SE86C	Hart 418T 1.9 L Turbo I4	A	127	(United Kingdom) John Foulston	7
(United Kingdom) Chamberlain Engineering	Spice SE86C	Hart 418T 1.9 L Turbo I4	A	127	(United Kingdom) Bob Juggins	8
(United Kingdom) Chamberlain Engineering	Spice SE86C	Hart 418T 1.9 L Turbo I4	A	127	(United Kingdom) Ian Khan	9–10
(West Germany) Karl-Heinz Becker	Lola T600	BMW 1.6 L Turbo I4		119	(West Germany) Karl-Heinz Becker	6
(West Germany) Karl-Heinz Becker	Lola T600	BMW 1.6 L Turbo I4		119	(West Germany) Volker Cordlandwehr	6
(United Kingdom) Cosmik Racing with GP Motorsport	Tiga GC287	Ford Cosworth DFL 3.3 L V8	G	121	(Greece) Costas Los	4–10
(United Kingdom) Cosmik Racing with GP Motorsport	Tiga GC287	Ford Cosworth DFL 3.3 L V8	G	121	(United Kingdom) Dudley Wood	4–9
(United Kingdom) Cosmik Racing with GP Motorsport	Tiga GC287	Ford Cosworth DFL 3.3 L V8	G	121	(United Kingdom) James Weaver	4, 7
(United Kingdom) Cosmik Racing with GP Motorsport	Tiga GC287	Ford Cosworth DFL 3.3 L V8	G	121	(United States) Tom Hessert	5
(United Kingdom) Cosmik Racing with GP Motorsport	Tiga GC287	Ford Cosworth DFL 3.3 L V8	G	121	(United Kingdom) Chris Hodgetts	10
(United Kingdom) Charles Ivey Racing	Tiga GC287	Porsche Type-935/76 2.6 L Turbo Flat-6	A	123	(United Kingdom) Dudley Wood	1, 3
(United Kingdom) Charles Ivey Racing	Tiga GC287	Porsche Type-935/76 2.6 L Turbo Flat-6	A	123	(United Kingdom) Mark Newby	1, 3
(United Kingdom) Charles Ivey Racing	Tiga GC287	Porsche Type-935/76 2.6 L Turbo Flat-6	A	123	(United Kingdom) Ian Taylor	4
(United Kingdom) Charles Ivey Racing	Tiga GC287	Porsche Type-935/76 2.6 L Turbo Flat-6	A	123	(United Kingdom) Pete Lovett	4
(United Kingdom) Charles Ivey Racing	Tiga GC287	Porsche Type-935/76 2.6 L Turbo Flat-6	A	123	(United Kingdom) John Cooper	5
(United Kingdom) Charles Ivey Racing	Tiga GC287	Porsche Type-935/76 2.6 L Turbo Flat-6	A	123	(United Kingdom) Tom Dodd-Noble	5
(United Kingdom) Charles Ivey Racing	Tiga GC287	Porsche Type-935/76 2.6 L Turbo Flat-6	A	123	(Morocco) Max Cohen-Olivar	5
(United Kingdom) Charles Ivey Racing	Tiga GC287	Porsche Type-935/76 2.6 L Turbo Flat-6	A	123	(United Kingdom) John Sheldon	7–9
(United Kingdom) Charles Ivey Racing	Tiga GC287	Porsche Type-935/76 2.6 L Turbo Flat-6	A	123	(France) Philippe de Henning	7–9
(France) Oudet Racing (France) Vetir Racing Team	Tiga GC85	Ford Cosworth DFL 3.3 L V8	A	125	(France) Patrick Oudet	4–5
(France) Oudet Racing (France) Vetir Racing Team	Tiga GC85	Ford Cosworth DFL 3.3 L V8	A	125	(France) Bruno Sotty	4–5
(France) Oudet Racing (France) Vetir Racing Team	Tiga GC85	Ford Cosworth DFL 3.3 L V8	A	125	(France) Jean-Claude Justice	4–5
(Italy) Alba Carma	Alba AR6	Carma 1.9 L Turbo I4		130	(Italy) Martino Finotto	3
(Italy) Alba Carma	Alba AR6	Carma 1.9 L Turbo I4		130	(Italy) Pietro Silva	3
(Italy) Alba Carma	Alba AR6	Carma 1.9 L Turbo I4		130	(Italy) Ruggero Melgrati	3
(West Germany) Gebhardt Motorsport	Gebhardt JC873	Audi 2.1 L Turbo I5	A	140	(West Germany) Günther Gebhardt	9
(West Germany) Gebhardt Motorsport	Gebhardt JC873	Audi 2.1 L Turbo I5	A	140	(Austria) Ernst Franzmaier	9
(West Germany) Gebhardt Motorsport	Gebhardt JC873	Audi 2.1 L Turbo I5	A	140	(Austria) Walter Lechner	9
(Japan) British Barn Racing Team	JTK 62C	Ford Cosworth DFL 3.3 L V8	D	150	(Japan) Jirou Yoneyama	10
(Japan) British Barn Racing Team	JTK 62C	Ford Cosworth DFL 3.3 L V8	D	150	(Japan) Hideshi Matsuda	10
(Japan) British Barn Racing Team	JTK 62C	Ford Cosworth DFL 3.3 L V8	D	150	(Japan) Kiyoshi Misaki	10
(Japan) Ba-Tsu Racing Team	MCS Guppy	Mazda 13B 1.3 L 2-rotor	D	170	(Japan) Ichirou Mizuno	10
(Japan) Ba-Tsu Racing Team	MCS Guppy	Mazda 13B 1.3 L 2-rotor	D	170	(Japan) Syuuji Fujii	10
(Japan) Ba-Tsu Racing Team	MCS Guppy	Mazda 13B 1.3 L 2-rotor	D	170	(Japan) Kazuhiko Oda	10
(United Kingdom) CEE Sport Racing	Tiga GC286	Volvo 2.3 L Turbo I4; Ford Cosworth BDT 1.7 L Turbo I4	A	171	(Sweden) Slim Borgudd	5
(United Kingdom) CEE Sport Racing	Tiga GC286	Volvo 2.3 L Turbo I4; Ford Cosworth BDT 1.7 L Turbo I4	A	171	(Sweden) Tryggve Gronvall	5
(United Kingdom) CEE Sport Racing	Tiga GC286	Volvo 2.3 L Turbo I4; Ford Cosworth BDT 1.7 L Turbo I4	A	171	(United Kingdom) Andrew Ratcliffe	5
(United Kingdom) CEE Sport Racing	Tiga GC286	Volvo 2.3 L Turbo I4; Ford Cosworth BDT 1.7 L Turbo I4	A	171	(United Kingdom) Laurence Jacobsen	7, 9
(United Kingdom) CEE Sport Racing	Tiga GC286	Volvo 2.3 L Turbo I4; Ford Cosworth BDT 1.7 L Turbo I4	A	171	(Italy) Stefano Sebastiani	7, 9
(United Kingdom) CEE Sport Racing	Tiga GC286	Volvo 2.3 L Turbo I4; Ford Cosworth BDT 1.7 L Turbo I4	A	171	(United Kingdom) John Fyda	7
(United Kingdom) CEE Sport Racing	Tiga GC286	Volvo 2.3 L Turbo I4; Ford Cosworth BDT 1.7 L Turbo I4	A	171	(United Kingdom) Richard Jones	9
(France) Automobiles Louis Descartes	ALD 03	BMW M88 3.5 L I6	A	177	(France) Jacques Heuclin	3–5, 7, 9
(France) Automobiles Louis Descartes	ALD 03	BMW M88 3.5 L I6	A	177	(France) Dominique Lacaud	3, 5, 7–9
(France) Automobiles Louis Descartes	ALD 03	BMW M88 3.5 L I6	A	177	(France) Gérard Tremblay	3, 8
(France) Automobiles Louis Descartes	ALD 03	BMW M88 3.5 L I6	A	177	(France) Louis Descartes	4–5, 7–9
(France) Automobiles Louis Descartes	ALD 02	BMW M88 3.5 L I6	A	178	(France) Gérard Tremblay	2, 4–5, 7–9
(France) Automobiles Louis Descartes	ALD 02	BMW M88 3.5 L I6	A	178	(France) Dominique Lacaud	2, 4
(France) Automobiles Louis Descartes	ALD 02	BMW M88 3.5 L I6	A	178	(France) Louis Descartes	2
(France) Automobiles Louis Descartes	ALD 02	BMW M88 3.5 L I6	A	178	(France) Sylvain Boulay	4–5
(France) Automobiles Louis Descartes	ALD 02	BMW M88 3.5 L I6	A	178	(France) Michel Lateste	5
(France) Automobiles Louis Descartes	ALD 02	BMW M88 3.5 L I6	A	178	(France) Rudi Thomann	7
(France) Automobiles Louis Descartes	ALD 02	BMW M88 3.5 L I6	A	178	(France) Jean-Claude Ferrarin	7
(France) Automobiles Louis Descartes	ALD 02	BMW M88 3.5 L I6	A	178	(France) Bruno Sotty	8–9
(France) Automobiles Louis Descartes	ALD 02	BMW M88 3.5 L I6	A	178	(France) Thierry Lecerf	9
(United Kingdom) Dune Motorsport	Tiga GC287	Rover V64V 3.2 L V6	A	181	(Australia) Neil Crang	3–4, 9
(United Kingdom) Dune Motorsport	Tiga GC287	Rover V64V 3.2 L V6	A	181	(United Kingdom) Duncan Bain	3–4, 9
(United Kingdom) Dune Motorsport	Tiga GC287	Rover V64V 3.2 L V6	A	181	(Switzerland) Jean Krucker	4
(United Kingdom) Ark Racing with Arthur Hough	Ceekar 83J-1	Ford Cosworth DFV 3.0 L V8	A	188	(United Kingdom) Max Payne	7–9
(United Kingdom) Ark Racing with Arthur Hough	Ceekar 83J-1	Ford Cosworth DFV 3.0 L V8	A	188	(United Kingdom) Lawrie Hickman	7–9
(United Kingdom) Ark Racing with Arthur Hough	Ceekar 83J-1	Ford Cosworth DFV 3.0 L V8	A	188	(United Kingdom) Chris Ashmore	9
(United Kingdom) PC Automotive	Royale RP40	Ford Cosworth DFL 3.3 L V8		191	(United Kingdom) Richard Piper	7
(United Kingdom) PC Automotive	Royale RP40	Ford Cosworth DFL 3.3 L V8		191	(United Kingdom) Mike Catlow	7
(United Kingdom) Roy Baker Racing	Tiga GC286	Ford Cosworth DFL 3.3 L V8	A	198	(Greece) Costas Los	1–2
(United Kingdom) Roy Baker Racing	Tiga GC286	Ford Cosworth DFL 3.3 L V8	A	198	(Italy) Pasquale Barberio	1–2
(United Kingdom) Roy Baker Racing	Tiga GC286	Ford Cosworth DFL 3.3 L V8	A	198	(United Kingdom) Val Musetti	3
(United Kingdom) Roy Baker Racing	Tiga GC286	Ford Cosworth DFL 3.3 L V8	A	198	(France) Rudi Thomann	3
(United Kingdom) Roy Baker Racing	Tiga GC286	Ford Cosworth DFL 3.3 L V8	A	198	(United Kingdom) David Andrews	4–5, 7–10
(United Kingdom) Roy Baker Racing	Tiga GC286	Ford Cosworth DFL 3.3 L V8	A	198	(Canada) Robert Peters	4–5
(United Kingdom) Roy Baker Racing	Tiga GC286	Ford Cosworth DFL 3.3 L V8	A	198	(Morocco) Max Cohen-Olivar	4, 8
(United Kingdom) Roy Baker Racing	Tiga GC286	Ford Cosworth DFL 3.3 L V8	A	198	(United States) Mike Allison	5
(United Kingdom) Roy Baker Racing	Tiga GC286	Ford Cosworth DFL 3.3 L V8	A	198	(United Kingdom) Mike Kimpton	7, 9
(United Kingdom) Roy Baker Racing	Tiga GC286	Ford Cosworth DFL 3.3 L V8	A	198	(United Kingdom) Jeremy Rossiter	7
(United Kingdom) Roy Baker Racing	Tiga GC286	Ford Cosworth DFL 3.3 L V8	A	198	(United Kingdom) Chris Ashmore	8
(United Kingdom) Roy Baker Racing	Tiga GC286	Ford Cosworth DFL 3.3 L V8	A	198	(Belgium) Patrick de Radigues	10
(United Kingdom) Roy Baker Racing	Tiga GC286	Ford Cosworth BDT-E 1.7 L Turbo I4	A	199	(United Kingdom) John Sheldon	4
(United Kingdom) Roy Baker Racing	Tiga GC286	Ford Cosworth BDT-E 1.7 L Turbo I4	A	199	(Canada) Robert Peters	4
(United Kingdom) Roy Baker Racing	Tiga GC286	Ford Cosworth BDT-E 1.7 L Turbo I4	A	199	(Sweden) Tryggve Gronvall	4
(West Germany) Dahm Cars Racing	Argo JM19	Porsche 3.2 L Turbo Flat-6	G	200	(West Germany) Peter Fritsch	5, 8
(West Germany) Dahm Cars Racing	Argo JM19	Porsche 3.2 L Turbo Flat-6	G	200	(Belgium) Teddy Pilette	5
(West Germany) Dahm Cars Racing	Argo JM19	Porsche 3.2 L Turbo Flat-6	G	200	(Belgium) Jean-Paul Libert	5
(West Germany) Dahm Cars Racing	Argo JM19	Porsche 3.2 L Turbo Flat-6	G	200	(West Germany) Dieter Heinzelmann	6, 8
(West Germany) Dahm Cars Racing	Argo JM19	Porsche 3.2 L Turbo Flat-6	G	200	(West Germany) Olaf Manthey	6
(West Germany) Dahm Cars Racing	Argo JM19	Porsche 3.2 L Turbo Flat-6	G	200	(Sweden) Kenneth Leim	7–9
(West Germany) Dahm Cars Racing	Argo JM19	Porsche 3.2 L Turbo Flat-6	G	200	(United Kingdom) Robin Donovan	7
(West Germany) Dahm Cars Racing	Argo JM19	Porsche 3.2 L Turbo Flat-6	G	200	(Belgium) Patrick de Radigues	9
(West Germany) Dahm Cars Racing	Argo JM19	Porsche 3.2 L Turbo Flat-6	G	200	(Belgium) Guy Nève	9

== Season results ==
=== Races ===
Rnd	Circuit	Outright Winning Team	C2 Winning Team	Reports
Rnd	Circuit	Outright Winning Drivers	C2 Winning Drivers	Reports
1	Jarama	(United Kingdom) No. 5 Silk Cut Jaguar	(United Kingdom) No. 111 Spice Engineering	Report
1	Jarama	(Netherlands) Jan Lammers (United Kingdom) John Watson	(United Kingdom) Gordon Spice (Spain) Fermín Vélez	Report
2	Jerez	(United Kingdom) No. 4 Silk Cut Jaguar	(United Kingdom) No. 111 Spice Engineering	Report
2	Jerez	(United States) Eddie Cheever (Brazil) Raul Boesel	(United Kingdom) Gordon Spice (Spain) Fermín Vélez	Report
3	Monza	(United Kingdom) No. 5 Silk Cut Jaguar	(United Kingdom) No. 111 Spice Engineering	Report
3	Monza	(Netherlands) Jan Lammers (United Kingdom) John Watson	(United Kingdom) Gordon Spice (Spain) Fermín Vélez	Report
4	Silverstone	(United Kingdom) No. 4 Silk Cut Jaguar	(United Kingdom) No. 102 Swiftair Ecurie Ecosse	Report
4	Silverstone	(United States) Eddie Cheever (Brazil) Raul Boesel	(United Kingdom) Ray Mallock (United Kingdom) David Leslie	Report
5	Le Mans	(West Germany) No. 17 Porsche AG	(United Kingdom) No. 111 Spice Engineering	Report
5	Le Mans	(West Germany) Hans-Joachim Stuck (United Kingdom) Derek Bell (United States) Al Holbert	(United Kingdom) Gordon Spice (Spain) Fermín Vélez (France) Philippe de Henning	Report
6	Norisring	(United Kingdom) No. 15 Liqui Moly Equipe	(United Kingdom) No. 111 Spice Engineering	Report
6	Norisring	(Italy) Mauro Baldi (United Kingdom) Jonathan Palmer	(United Kingdom) Gordon Spice (Spain) Fermín Vélez	Report
7	Brands Hatch	(United Kingdom) No. 4 Silk Cut Jaguar	(United Kingdom) No. 102 Swiftair Ecurie Ecosse	Report
7	Brands Hatch	(Brazil) Raul Boesel (Denmark) John Nielsen	(United Kingdom) Ray Mallock (United Kingdom) David Leslie	Report
8	Nürburgring	(United Kingdom) No. 4 Silk Cut Jaguar	(United Kingdom) No. 121 Cosmik Racing with GP Motorsport	Report
8	Nürburgring	(United States) Eddie Cheever (Brazil) Raul Boesel	(Greece) Costas Los (United Kingdom) Dudley Wood	Report
9	Spa-Francorchamps	(United Kingdom) No. 6 Silk Cut Jaguar	(United Kingdom) No. 111 Spice Engineering	Report
9	Spa-Francorchamps	(Brazil) Raul Boesel (United Kingdom) Martin Brundle (United Kingdom) Johnny Dumfries	(United Kingdom) Gordon Spice (Spain) Fermín Vélez	Report
10	Fuji	(United Kingdom) No. 5 Silk Cut Jaguar	(United Kingdom) No. 111 Spice Engineering	Report
10	Fuji	(Netherlands) Jan Lammers (United Kingdom) John Watson	(United Kingdom) Gordon Spice (Spain) Fermín Vélez	Report

Points system
1st	2nd	3rd	4th	5th	6th	7th	8th	9th	10th	Group C2 Bonus
20	15	12	10	8	6	4	3	2	1	2

In order to be classified for points, a team had to complete 90% of the winner's distance. Further, drivers were required to complete at least 30% of their car's total race distance to qualify for championship points. Drivers forfeited points if they drove in more than one car during the race. Group C2 drivers earned extra championship points for any finish within the overall top ten positions.

=== Drivers championships ===
The respective driver championships only counted each driver's seven highest scores toward the final championship total. Points not counted toward the driver's tally are marked with parenthesis.

==== World Sports Prototype Championship for Drivers ====
Pos	Driver	Team	(Spain) JAR	(Spain) JRZ	(Italy) MON	(United Kingdom) SIL	(France) LMS	(West Germany) NOR	(United Kingdom) BRH	(West Germany) NUR	(Belgium) SPA	(Japan) FUJ	Points
1	(Brazil) Raul Boesel	(United Kingdom) Silk Cut Jaguar	3	1	Ret	1	(5)	(4)	1	1	1	2	127
2	(Netherlands) Jan Lammers	(United Kingdom) Silk Cut Jaguar	1	Ret	1	2	5	Ret	3	Ret	2	1	102
2	(United Kingdom) John Watson	(United Kingdom) Silk Cut Jaguar	1	Ret	1	2	Ret	Ret	3	Ret	2	1	102
4	(United States) Eddie Cheever	(United Kingdom) Silk Cut Jaguar	3	1		1	5	4		1	4		100
5	(United Kingdom) Derek Bell	(West Germany) Porsche AG	2	3	2	3	1	Ret					99
5	(United Kingdom) Derek Bell	(Germany) Joest Racing							4	2	(5)		99
5	(United Kingdom) Derek Bell	(Australia) Rothmans Porsche Team Schuppan										(6)	99
5	(West Germany) Hans-Joachim Stuck	(West Germany) Porsche AG	2	3	2	3	1	Ret					99
5	(West Germany) Hans-Joachim Stuck	(Germany) Joest Racing							4	2	(5)		99
7	(Argentina) Oscar Larrauri	(Switzerland) Brun Motorsport	5	7	3	Ret	Ret	Ret	5	3	3	4	69
8	(Italy) Mauro Baldi	(United Kingdom) Liqui Moly Equipe	8	Ret	Ret	Ret		1	2	5	Ret	3	58
8	(West Germany) Jochen Mass	(West Germany) Porsche AG		Ret	6	4	Ret						58
8	(West Germany) Jochen Mass	(Switzerland) Brun Motorsport						2	5	3	3	4	58
10	(United Kingdom) Johnny Dumfries	(United Kingdom) Swiftair Ecurie Ecosse				8							55
10	(United Kingdom) Johnny Dumfries	(Switzerland) Kouros Racing					Ret			DNS			55
10	(United Kingdom) Johnny Dumfries	(West Germany) Dauer Racing						Ret					55
10	(United Kingdom) Johnny Dumfries	(United Kingdom) Liqui Moly Equipe							2				55
10	(United Kingdom) Johnny Dumfries	(United Kingdom) Silk Cut Jaguar									1	2	55
11	(United Kingdom) Gordon Spice	(United Kingdom) Spice Engineering	(9)	4	7	7	6	6	8	DSQ	(10)	8	50
11	(Spain) Fermín Vélez	(United Kingdom) Spice Engineering	(9)	4	7	7	6	6	8	DSQ	(10)	8	50
13	(West Germany) Frank Jelinski	(Switzerland) Brun Motorsport	7	Ret	3								40
13	(West Germany) Frank Jelinski	(West Germany) Joest Racing					Ret	DSQ		4	6	5	40
13	(United Kingdom) Ray Mallock	(United Kingdom) Swiftair Ecurie Ecosse	11	5	8	6	8	7	7	Ret	13	14	40
13	(United Kingdom) David Leslie	(United Kingdom) Swiftair Ecurie Ecosse	11	5	8	6	8	7	7	Ret	13	14	40
16	(Spain) Jésus Pareja	(Switzerland) Brun Motorsport	5	7	3	5	Ret	10	9	6	8	Ret	38
17	(Denmark) John Nielsen	(United Kingdom) Tom Walkinshaw Racing		DNS	Ret	Ret	Ret		1		4		32
17	(Denmark) John Nielsen	(Japan) From-A Racing										9	32
17	(Sweden) Stanley Dickens	(West Germany) Joest Racing			4		Ret	3		4	6	DNS	32
19	(West Germany) Volker Weidler	(West Germany) Porsche Kremer Racing	4	2		Ret	Ret	NC	6	14	Ret	NC	31
19	(Denmark) Kris Nissen	(West Germany) Porsche Kremer Racing	4	2		Ret	Ret	NC	6	14	Ret	NC	31
19	(United Kingdom) Jonathan Palmer	(United Kingdom) Liqui Moly Equipe	8	Ret		Ret	Ret	1		5	Ret		31
22	(West Germany) Jürgen Lässig	(France) Primagaz Compétition					2	5		7	9		29
23	(France) Pierre Yver	(France) Primagaz Compétition					2	5			9		23
24	(West Germany) "John Winter"	(West Germany) Joest Racing			4			3		4	6	5	22
25	(United States) Al Holbert	(West Germany) Porsche AG					1						20
25	(United Kingdom) Martin Brundle	(United Kingdom) Silk Cut Jaguar				Ret	Ret				1		20
25	(Italy) Massimo Sigala	(Switzerland) Brun Motorsport	6	6	5	Ret					11		20
25	(Italy) Gianfranco Brancatelli	(Switzerland) Brun Motorsport	6	6	5								20
29	(New Zealand) Mike Thackwell	(Switzerland) Kouros Racing				Ret	Ret	Ret		Ret	7		16
29	(New Zealand) Mike Thackwell	(United Kingdom) Liqui Moly Equipe										3	16
29	(France) Bob Wollek	(West Germany) Porsche AG		Ret	6	4	Ret						16
29	(France) Bob Wollek	(West Germany) Joest Racing						Ret		Ret	5	5	16
31	(Switzerland) Walter Brun	(Switzerland) Brun Motorsport	7	Ret	Ret	5		10	9	12	11		15
32	(Belgium) Hervé Regout	(France) Primagaz Compétition			9	Ret	3						14
33	(France) Pierre-Henri Raphanel	(France) Primagaz Compétition					3						12
34	(Austria) Franz Konrad	(West Germany) Porsche Kremer Racing					4					12	10
34	(Austria) Franz Konrad	(Italy) Mussato Action Car						DSQ					10
34	(South Africa) George Fouché	(West Germany) Porsche Kremer Racing					4					12	10
34	(Italy) Ranieri Randaccio	(Italy) Kelmar Racing		Ret	Ret	10		9	12	10			10
Pos	Driver	Team	(Spain) JAR	(Spain) JRZ	(Italy) MON	(United Kingdom) SIL	(France) LMS	(West Germany) NOR	(United Kingdom) BRH	(West Germany) NUR	(Belgium) SPA	(Japan) FUJ	Points

Colour	Result
Gold	Winner
Silver	Second place
Bronze	Third place
Green	Points classification
Blue	Non-points classification
Blue	Non-classified finish (NC)
Purple	Retired, not classified (Ret)
Red	Did not qualify (DNQ)
Red	Did not pre-qualify (DNPQ)
Black	Disqualified (DSQ)
White	Did not start (DNS)
White	Withdrew (WD)
White	Race cancelled (C)
Blank	Did not practice (DNP)
Blank	Did not arrive (DNA)
Blank	Excluded (EX)

=== FIA Cup for Group C2 Drivers ===
Pos	Driver	Team	(Spain) JAR	(Spain) JRZ	(Italy) MON	(United Kingdom) SIL	(France) LMS	(West Germany) NOR	(United Kingdom) BRH	(West Germany) NUR	(Belgium) SPA	(Japan) FUJ	Points
1	(United Kingdom) Gordon Spice	(United Kingdom) Spice Engineering	1	1	1	(2)	1	1	(2)	DSQ	1	1	140
1	(Spain) Fermín Vélez	(United Kingdom) Spice Engineering	1	1	1	(2)	1	1	(2)	DSQ	1	1	140
3	(United Kingdom) Ray Mallock	(United Kingdom) Swiftair Ecurie Ecosse	2	2	2	1	2	2	1	Ret	(3)	(2)	115
3	(United Kingdom) David Leslie	(United Kingdom) Swiftair Ecurie Ecosse	2	2	2	1	2	2	1	Ret	(3)	(2)	115
5	(United Kingdom) Mike Wilds	(United Kingdom) ADA Engineering	4	Ret									73
5	(United Kingdom) Mike Wilds	(United Kingdom) Swiftair Ecurie Ecosse				3	Ret	Ret	3	3	2	3	73
6	(Belgium) Marc Duez	(United Kingdom) Swiftair Ecurie Ecosse					2		3		2	3	54
7	(Denmark) Thorkild Thyrring	Team Tiga Ford Denmark	3	Ret	Ret		4	5	7	NC	Ret	5	46
8	(Greece) Costas Los	(United Kingdom) Roy Baker Racing	Ret	3									44
8	(Greece) Costas Los	(United Kingdom) Chamberlain Engineering			Ret								44
8	(Greece) Costas Los	(United Kingdom) Cosmik Racing with GP Motorsport				NC	3	DSQ	Ret	1	Ret	Ret	44
9	(Italy) Ranieri Randaccio	(Italy) Kelmar Racing		Ret	Ret	4		4	5	2			43
10	(Norway) Martin Schanche	(Norway) Team Lucky Strike Schanche	Ret	Ret	4	DNS	Ret	6	4	Ret	4		36
10	(United Kingdom) Will Hoy	(Norway) Team Lucky Strike Schanche	Ret	Ret	4	DNS	Ret	6	4	Ret	4		36
12	(West Germany) Hellmut Mundas	(West Germany) URD Junior Team	5	Ret	3	7		Ret	Ret	4		Ret	34
12	(West Germany) Rudi Seher	(West Germany) URD Junior Team	5	Ret	3	7		Ret	Ret	4			34
14	(Italy) Pasquale Barberio	(United Kingdom) Roy Baker Racing	Ret	NC									33
14	(Italy) Pasquale Barberio	(Italy) Techno Racing			NC								33
14	(Italy) Pasquale Barberio	(Italy) Kelmar Racing				4			5	2	6		33
15	(United Kingdom) Dudley Wood	(United Kingdom) Charles Ivey Racing	Ret		Ret								32
15	(United Kingdom) Dudley Wood	(United Kingdom) Cosmik Racing with GP Motorsport				NC	3	DSQ	Ret	1	Ret		32
16	(United Kingdom) Nick Adams	(United Kingdom) Chamberlain Engineering			Ret	Ret	NC		6	6	10		28
16	(United Kingdom) Nick Adams	(United Kingdom) Spice Engineering						3					28
17	(Italy) Vito Veninata	(Italy) Kelmar Racing		Ret	Ret				5	2			21
18	(United Kingdom) John Sheldon	(United Kingdom) Roy Baker Racing				NC							18
18	(United Kingdom) John Sheldon	Team Tiga Ford Denmark					4	5					18
18	(United Kingdom) John Sheldon	(United Kingdom) Charles Ivey Racing							Ret	NC	11		18
19	(France) Jean-Louis Ricci	(United Kingdom) Olindo Iacobelli					Ret		6	NC	5	Ret	17
20	(France) Dominique Lacaud	(France) Automobiles Louis Descartes		Ret	Ret	DNQ	5		Ret	Ret	8		14

=== Teams championships ===
==== World Sports Prototype Championship for Teams ====
Pos	Team	(Spain) JAR	(Spain) JRZ	(Italy) MON	(United Kingdom) SIL	(France) LMS	(West Germany) NOR	(United Kingdom) BRH	(West Germany) NUR	(Belgium) SPA	(Japan) FUJ	Points
1	(United Kingdom) Silk Cut Jaguar	1	1	1	1	(5)	(4)	1	1	1	(1)	140
2	(Switzerland) Brun Motorsport	5	(6)	3	5	Ret	2	(5)	3	3	4	77
3	(West Germany) Porsche AG	2	3	2	3	1	Ret					74
4	(West Germany) Joest Racing			4		Ret	3	4	2	5	5	63
5	(United Kingdom) Liqui Moly Equipe	8	Ret	Ret	Ret	Ret	1	2	5	Ret	3	58
6	(West Germany) Porsche Kremer Racing	4	2		Ret	4	NC	6	14	Ret	12	41
7	(United Kingdom) Spice Engineering	(9)	4	7	7	6	6	8	DSQ	(10)	8	36
8	(France) Primagaz Competition			9	Ret	2	5		7	9		31
9	(United Kingdom) Swiftair Ecurie Ecosse	11	5	8	6	8	7	7	11	12	14	28
10	(Japan) Mazdaspeed					7					7	8
11	(Australia) Rothmans Porsche Team Schuppan										6	6
12	(Switzerland) Kouros Racing				Ret	Ret	Ret		Ret	7		4
12	(United Kingdom) Cosmik Racing with GP Motorsport				NC	9	Ret	Ret	9	Ret	Ret	4
12	(Italy) Kelmar Racing		Ret	Ret	10		9	12	10	16		4
15	(West Germany) Victor Dauer Racing						Ret		8			3
16	(United Kingdom) Richard Cleare Racing				9							2
16	(Japan) From A Racing										9	2
18	(Germany) URD Junior Team	14	Ret	10	13		Ret	Ret	13		Ret	1
18	Team Tiga Ford Denmark	12	Ret	Ret		10	11	14	NC	Ret	20	1
18	(Japan) Trust Racing Team										10	1

Colour	Result
Gold	Winner
Silver	Second place
Bronze	Third place
Green	Points classification
Blue	Non-points classification
Blue	Non-classified finish (NC)
Purple	Retired, not classified (Ret)
Red	Did not qualify (DNQ)
Red	Did not pre-qualify (DNPQ)
Black	Disqualified (DSQ)
White	Did not start (DNS)
White	Withdrew (WD)
White	Race cancelled (C)
Blank	Did not practice (DNP)
Blank	Did not arrive (DNA)
Blank	Excluded (EX)

=== 1987 FIA Cup for Group C2 Teams ===
Points towards the 1987 FIA Cup for Group C2 Sports-Prototypes Teams were awarded to the top 10 Group C2 class finishers in the order of 20-15-12-10-8-6-4-3-2-1.

Only the best seven round results could be retained towards a Team's total.

Pos	Team	Chassis	Engine	Rd1	Rd2	Rd3	Rd4	Rd5	Rd6	Rd7	Rd8	Rd9	Rd10	Total
1	(United Kingdom) Spice Engineering	Spice SE86C; Spice SE87C	Ford Cosworth DFL 3.3L V8	20	20	20	(15)	20	20	(15)		20	20	140
2	(United Kingdom) Swiftair Ecurie Ecosse	Ecosse C286	Ford Cosworth DFL 3.3L V8	15	15	15	20	15	15	20	(12)	(15)	(15)	115
3	(Italy) Kelmar Racing	Tiga GC85	Ford Cosworth DFL 3.3L V8				10		10	8	15	6		49
4	(Denmark) Tiga Ford DK	Tiga GC287	Ford Cosworth DBT-E 2.3L Turbo I4	12				10	8	4			8	46
5	(Norway) Team Lucky Strike Schanche	Argo JM19B	Zakspeed 1.9L Turbo I4			10			6	10		10		36
6	(United Kingdom) Chamberlain Engineering	Spice SE86C	Hart 418T 1.8L Turbo I4; Ford Cosworth DFL 3.3L V8					6		6	6	8	10	36
6	(Germany) URD Junior Team	URD C83	BMW 3.5L I6	8		12	4				10			34
8	(United Kingdom) GP Motorsport	Tiga GC286; Tiga GC287	Ford Cosworth DFL 3.3L V8					12			20			32
9	(United Kingdom) Cosmik RBR	Tiga GC286	Ford Cosworth DFL 3.3L V8		12						8			20
10	(France) Automobiles Louis Descartes	ALD 02; ALD 03	BMW 3.5L I6				3	8				3		14
11	(United Kingdom) ADA Engineering	Gebhardt JC843; ADA 02	Ford Cosworth DFL 3.3L V8	10										10
12	(United Kingdom) Charles Ivey Engineering	Tiga GC287	Porsche 2.6L Turbo Flat-6				8							8
13	(United Kingdom) Dune Motorsport	Tiga GC287	Rover V64V 3.0L V6				6							6
14	(United Kingdom) Ark Racing	Ceekar 83J	Ford Cosworth DFV 3.0L V8									4		4
15	(United Kingdom) CEE Sport Racing	Tiga GC286	Ford Cosworth BDT 1.7L Turbo I4							2				2
