= 1987 1000 km of Jerez =

Layout of the Circuito de Jerez (1985-1992)

The 1987 1000 km Jerez was the second round of the 1987 World Sports-Prototype Championship. It took place at the Circuito Permanente de Jerez, Spain on March 29, 1987. It was the second running of the 1000 km of Jerez as part of the World Sportscar Championship.

== Official results ==
Class winners in bold. Cars failing to complete 75% of the winner's distance marked as Not Classified (NC).

Pos	Class	No	Team	Drivers	Chassis	Tyre	Laps
Pos	Class	No	Team	Drivers	Engine	Tyre	Laps
1	**C1**	**4**	**(United Kingdom) Silk Cut Jaguar**	**(United States) Eddie Cheever (Brazil) Raul Boesel**	**Jaguar XJR-8**	D	**211**
1	**C1**	**4**	**(United Kingdom) Silk Cut Jaguar**	**(United States) Eddie Cheever (Brazil) Raul Boesel**	**Jaguar 7.0L V12**	D	**211**
2	C1	10	(Germany) Kremer Porsche Racing	(Germany) Volker Weidler (Denmark) Kris Nissen	Porsche 962C	Y	208
2	C1	10	(Germany) Kremer Porsche Racing	(Germany) Volker Weidler (Denmark) Kris Nissen	Porsche Type-935 2.8L Turbo Flat-6	Y	208
3	C1	17	(Germany) Rothmans Porsche	(Germany) Hans-Joachim Stuck (United Kingdom) Derek Bell	Porsche 962C	D	205
3	C1	17	(Germany) Rothmans Porsche	(Germany) Hans-Joachim Stuck (United Kingdom) Derek Bell	Porsche Type-935 3.0L Turbo Flat-6	D	205
4	**C2**	**111**	**(United Kingdom) Spice Engineering**	**(United Kingdom) Gordon Spice (Spain) Fermín Vélez**	**Spice SE86C**	A	**199**
4	**C2**	**111**	**(United Kingdom) Spice Engineering**	**(United Kingdom) Gordon Spice (Spain) Fermín Vélez**	**Ford Cosworth DFL 3.3L V8**	A	**199**
5	C2	101	(United Kingdom) Ecurie Ecosse	(United Kingdom) David Leslie (United Kingdom) Ray Mallock	Ecosse C286	A	199
5	C2	101	(United Kingdom) Ecurie Ecosse	(United Kingdom) David Leslie (United Kingdom) Ray Mallock	Ford Cosworth DFL 3.3L V8	A	199
6	C1	2	(Switzerland) Brun Motorsport	(Italy) Massimo Sigala (Italy) Gianfranco Brancatelli	Porsche 962C	MI	188
6	C1	2	(Switzerland) Brun Motorsport	(Italy) Massimo Sigala (Italy) Gianfranco Brancatelli	Porsche Type-935 2.8L Turbo Flat-6	MI	188
7	C1	3	(Switzerland) Brun Motorsport	(Spain) Jesús Pareja (Argentina) Oscar Larrauri (Switzerland) Walter Brun	Porsche 962C	MI	186
7	C1	3	(Switzerland) Brun Motorsport	(Spain) Jesús Pareja (Argentina) Oscar Larrauri (Switzerland) Walter Brun	Porsche Type-935 2.8L Turbo Flat-6	MI	186
8	C1	11	(Germany) Kremer Porsche Racing	(Spain) Emilio de Villota (Spain) Paco Romero	Porsche 962C	Y	162
8	C1	11	(Germany) Kremer Porsche Racing	(Spain) Emilio de Villota (Spain) Paco Romero	Porsche Type-935 2.8L Turbo Flat-6	Y	162
9 NC	C2	198	(United Kingdom) Cosmik Roy Baker Racing	(Italy) Pasquale Barberio (Greece) Costas Los	Tiga GC286	A	144
9 NC	C2	198	(United Kingdom) Cosmik Roy Baker Racing	(Italy) Pasquale Barberio (Greece) Costas Los	Ford Cosworth DFL 3.3L V8	A	144
10 DNF	C1	18	(Germany) Rothmans Porsche	(Germany) Jochen Mass (France) Bob Wollek	Porsche 962C	D	161
10 DNF	C1	18	(Germany) Rothmans Porsche	(Germany) Jochen Mass (France) Bob Wollek	Porsche Type-935 3.0L Turbo Flat-6	D	161
11 DNF	C2	114	Team Tiga Ford Denmark	(Denmark) Thorkild Thyrring (Sweden) Leif Lindström	Tiga GC287	A	128
11 DNF	C2	114	Team Tiga Ford Denmark	(Denmark) Thorkild Thyrring (Sweden) Leif Lindström	Ford Cosworth BDT-E 2.1L Turbo I4	A	128
12 DNF	C2	115	(United Kingdom) ADA Engineering	(United Kingdom) Mike Wilds (United Kingdom) Ian Harrower	Gebhardt JC843	A	121
12 DNF	C2	115	(United Kingdom) ADA Engineering	(United Kingdom) Mike Wilds (United Kingdom) Ian Harrower	Ford Cosworth DFL 3.3L V8	A	121
13 DNF	C2	117	(Norway) Team Lucky Strike Schanche	(Norway) Martin Schanche (United Kingdom) Will Hoy	Argo JM19B	A	114
13 DNF	C2	117	(Norway) Team Lucky Strike Schanche	(Norway) Martin Schanche (United Kingdom) Will Hoy	Zakspeed 1.9L Turbo I4	A	114
14 DNF	C2	104	(Germany) URD Junior Team	(Germany) Rudi Seher (Germany) Hellmut Mundas (Germany) Deiter Heinzelmann	URD C81/2	A	113
14 DNF	C2	104	(Germany) URD Junior Team	(Germany) Rudi Seher (Germany) Hellmut Mundas (Germany) Deiter Heinzelmann	BMW M88 3.5L I6	A	113
15 DNF	C2	116	(Italy) Technoracing	(Italy) Luigi Taverna (Italy) Oscar Berselli (Switzerland) Jean-Pierre Frey	Alba AR3	A	88
15 DNF	C2	116	(Italy) Technoracing	(Italy) Luigi Taverna (Italy) Oscar Berselli (Switzerland) Jean-Pierre Frey	Ford Cosworth DFL 3.3L V8	A	88
16 DNF	C1	5	(United Kingdom) Silk Cut Jaguar	(Netherlands) Jan Lammers (United Kingdom) John Watson	Jaguar XJR-8	D	65
16 DNF	C1	5	(United Kingdom) Silk Cut Jaguar	(Netherlands) Jan Lammers (United Kingdom) John Watson	Jaguar 7.0L V12	D	65
17 DNF	C2	178	(France) Automobiles Louis Descartes	(France) Louis Descartes (France) Gérard Tremblay (France) Dominique Lacaud	ALD C2	A	32
17 DNF	C2	178	(France) Automobiles Louis Descartes	(France) Louis Descartes (France) Gérard Tremblay (France) Dominique Lacaud	BMW M88 3.5L I6	A	32
18 DNF	C1	15	(United Kingdom) Britten – Lloyd Racing	(Italy) Mauro Baldi (United Kingdom) Jonathan Palmer	Porsche 962C GTi	G	27
18 DNF	C1	15	(United Kingdom) Britten – Lloyd Racing	(Italy) Mauro Baldi (United Kingdom) Jonathan Palmer	Porsche Type-935 2.8L Turbo Flat-6	G	27
19 DNF	C2	106	(Italy) Kelmar Racing	(Italy) Ranieri Randaccio (Italy) Maurizio Gellini (Italy) Vito Veninata	Tiga GC85	A	20
19 DNF	C2	106	(Italy) Kelmar Racing	(Italy) Ranieri Randaccio (Italy) Maurizio Gellini (Italy) Vito Veninata	Ford Cosworth DFL 3.3L V8	A	20
20 DNF	C1	1	(Switzerland) Brun Motorsport	(Switzerland) Walter Brun (Germany) Frank Jelinski	Porsche 962C	MI	5
20 DNF	C1	1	(Switzerland) Brun Motorsport	(Switzerland) Walter Brun (Germany) Frank Jelinski	Porsche Type-935 2.8L Turbo Flat-6	MI	5
DNQ	C2	103	(United Kingdom) John Bartlett Racing	(United Kingdom) Val Musetti (Morocco) Max Cohen-Olivar (Sweden) Kenneth Leim	Bardon DB1/2	A	-
DNQ	C2	103	(United Kingdom) John Bartlett Racing	(United Kingdom) Val Musetti (Morocco) Max Cohen-Olivar (Sweden) Kenneth Leim	Ford Cosworth DFL 3.3L V8	A	-

== Statistics ==
- Pole Position - #17 Rothmans Porsche - 1:29.190
- Average Speed - 147.817 km/h

World Sportscar Championship
Previous race: 1987 360 km of Jarama	1987 season	Next race: 1987 1000 km of Monza
