= Valentino Musetti =

British racing driver and stuntman (born 1943)

Valentino Musetti (born 7 January 1943 in Pontremoli, Tuscany, Italy), often known as just Val Musetti, is an Italian-born English film and TV stuntman and retired motor racing driver. Highlights of his career include finishing third in the Shellsport International Series in 1977. In 1978, he finished fifth in the Aurora F1 Championship. In the late 1980s, he drove in the FIA World Sportscar Championship. He competed in one round of the 1991 British Touring Car Championship at Donington Park. With a privately entered BMW M3, he finished in thirteenth place. That year, he also entered the 24 Hours of Le Mans, but his team failed to qualify.

Musetti has appeared in many TV programmes since the 1960s, such as The Avengers, Callan, Doctor Who (credited in the TV serial The Crusade), Space: 1999, The Professionals, Minder and Dempsey and Makepeace. He has worked as a stuntman on many TV programmes and films such as The Italian Job, The New Avengers, Superman II, An American Werewolf in London, Robin Hood: Prince of Thieves, Alien 3 and Midsomer Murders among others.

== Filmography ==
Year	Title	Role	Notes
1989	Batman	Napier Hood #4	

== Racing record ==
=== Complete Shellsport International Series results ===
(key) (Races in bold indicate pole position; races in italics indicate fastest lap)

Year	Entrant	Chassis	Engine	1	2	3	4	5	6	7	8	9	10	11	12	13	14	Pos.	Pts
1976	David Price Racing	March 752	Ford BDX Swindon 2.0 L4	MAL; NC	SNE; Ret	OUL; 6	BRH; 11	THR; 8	BRH; Ret		SNE; 13				BRH; Ret	BRH; 15		6th	43
1976	David Price Racing	March 752	Ford GAA 3.4 V6							MAL; 3		BRH; Ret	THR; 3	OUL; 4				6th	43
1977	David Price Racing	March 752	Ford GAA 3.4 V6	MAL; 5	SNE; NC	OUL; 3	**BRH**; 1	MAL; 2	THR; 9	BRH; 3	OUL; Ret	**MAL**; Ret	DON; 3	BRH	THR	SNE	BRH; DNS	3rd	85

=== Complete European Formula Two Championship results ===
(key) (Races in bold indicate pole position; races in italics indicate fastest lap)

Year	Entrant	Chassis	Engine	1	2	3	4	5	6	7	8	9	10	11	12	13	Pos.	Pts
1976	Valentino Musetti	March 74B	Ford	HOC	THR; DNS	VAL	SAL	PAU	HOC	ROU	MUG	PER	EST	NOG	HOC		NC	0
1977	David Price Racing	March 742	Ford	SIL; 12	THR; DNQ	HOC	NÜR	VAL	PAU	MUG	ROU	NOG	PER	MIS	EST	DON	NC	0

=== Complete British Formula One Championship results ===
(key) (note: results shown in bold indicate pole position; results in italics indicate fastest lap)

Year	Entrant	Chassis	Engine	1	2	3	4	5	6	7	8	9	10	11	12	13	14	15	Pos.	Pts
1978	Valentino Musetti	March 752/761	Ford Cosworth DFV 3.0 V8	OUL; NC	BRH; NC	SNE; Ret	MAL; 3	ZAN; 7	DON; 4	THR; 5	OUL; 3	MAL; Ret							7th	62
1978	Mario Deliotti Racing	Ensign N177	Ford Cosworth DFV 3.0 V8										BRH; 6	THR; 4	SNE; DNS				7th	62
1979	Valentino Musetti	March 752/771	Ford Cosworth DFV 3.0 V8	ZOL; Ret															23rd	1
1979	Valentino Musetti	March 781	Ford Cosworth DFV 3.0 V8		OUL; Ret	BRH; 6	MAL; NC	SNE; Ret	THR	ZAN									23rd	1
1979	Theodore Racing Hong Kong	Wolf WR3	Ford Cosworth DFV 3.0 V8								DON; 13	OUL; DNS	NOG	MAL					23rd	1
1979	Theodore Racing Hong Kong	Wolf WR4	Ford Cosworth DFV 3.0 V8												BRH; NC	THR	SNE	SIL	23rd	1
1980	Colin Bennett Racing	Fittipaldi F5A	Ford Cosworth DFV 3.0 V8	OUL	BRH	SIL	MAL	THR; 6	MNZ; 5	MAL; Ret	SNE; 6	BRH; 4							8th	11
1980	Colin Bennett Racing	Fittipaldi F5B	Ford Cosworth DFV 3.0 V8										THR; Ret	OUL; 3	SIL; 12				8th	11
1982	Colin Bennett Racing	March 811	Ford Cosworth DFV 3.0 V8	OUL; Ret	BRH; 3	THR; 2	DON	BRH											7th	10

=== Complete Formula One Non-Championship results ===
(key)

Year	Entrant	Chassis	Engine	1	2	3
1979	Valentino Musetti	March 781	Ford Cosworth DFV 3.0 V8	ROC; 12	GNM	DIN

=== Complete International Formula 3000 results ===
(key) (Races in bold indicate pole position; races in italics indicate fastest lap.)

Year	Entrant	Chassis	Engine	1	2	3	4	5	6	7	8	9	10	11	12	Pos.	Pts
1985	Lola Motorsport	Lola T950	Cosworth	SIL	THR	EST	NÜR	VAL	PAU	SPA	DIJ	PER	ÖST	ZAN	DON; 15	NC	0

=== Complete World Sportscar Championship results ===
(key) (Races in bold indicate pole position) (Races in italics indicate fastest lap)

Year	Entrant	Class	Chassis	Engine	1	2	3	4	5	6	7	8	9	10	11	Pos.	Pts
1986	Roy Baker Racing Tiga	C2	Tiga GC285	Ford Cosworth BDT 1.8 L4t	MNZ	SIL	LMS; Ret	NOR	BRH; 15	JER	NÜR	SPA	FUJ			NC	0
1987	John Bartlett Racing	C2	Bardon DB1	Cosworth DFL 3.3 V8	JAR	JER; DNQ		SIL; Ret	LMS	NOR						NC	0
1987	Roy Baker Racing	C2	Tiga GC286	Cosworth DFL 3.3 V8			MNZ; Ret									NC	0
1987	Team Tiga Ford Denmark	C2	Tiga GC287	Ford Cosworth BDT-E 2.1 L4t							BRH; 14	NÜR				NC	0
1987	Tiga Team	C2	Tiga GC287	Cosworth DFL 3.3 V8t									SPA; NC	FUJ		NC	0
1988	Roy Baker Racing	C2	Tiga GC286	Cosworth DFL 3.3 V8	JER	JAR	MNZ	SIL	LMS	BRN	BRH	NÜR	SPA; Ret	FUJ	SAN	NC	0
1990	Team Davey	C	Porsche 962C	Porsche Type 935 3.0 F6t	SUZ	MNZ	SIL	SPA	DIJ	NÜR	DON; 17	CGV	MEX			NC	0
1991	Team Salamin Primagaz	C2	Porsche 962C	Porsche Type 935 3.0 F6t	SUZ	MNZ	SIL	LMS; DNQ	NÜR	MAG	MEX	AUT				NC	0

=== 24 Hours of Le Mans results ===
Year	Team	Co-Drivers	Car	Class	Laps	Pos.	Class Pos.
1986	(United Kingdom) Roy Baker Racing Tiga	(United States) Tom Frank (United States) Mike Allison	Tiga GC285	C2	95	DNF	DNF
1991	(Switzerland) Team Salamin Primagaz	(Japan) Katsunori Iketani (Austria) Mercedes Stermitz	Porsche 962C	C2	-	DNQ	DNQ

=== Complete British Touring Car Championship results ===
(key) (Races in bold indicate pole position) (Races in italics indicate fastest lap)

Year	Team	Car	1	2	3	4	5	6	7	8	9	10	11	12	13	14	15	Pos.	Pts
1991	BRR Motorsport	BMW M3	SIL	SNE	DON	THR	SIL	BRH	SIL	DON; 1	DON; 2	OUL	BRH; 1	BRH; 2	DON; 13	THR	SIL	NC	0

=== Complete British GT Championship results ===
(key) (Races in bold indicate pole position) (Races in italics indicate fastest lap)

Year	Team	Car	Class	1	2	3	4	5	6	7	8	9	10	11	12	Pos	Points
2000	AC Automotive	Chevrolet Camaro	GT	THR; 1	CRO; 1	OUL; 1 DNS	DON; 1	SIL; 1	BRH; 1	DON; 1	CRO; 1	SIL; 1	SNE; 1; 12	SPA; 1	SIL; 1	38th	5
