= 1987 200 Miles of Norisring =

Sports car race in West Germany

Layout of the Norisring

The 1987 200 Meilen von Nürnberg was the sixth round of the 1987 World Sports-Prototype Championship, known as the ADAC Norisring Trophäe, as well as the second round of the 1987 German Supercup, known as the Bilstein Cup. It took place at the Norisring temporary street circuit, West Germany on June 28, 1987.

== Format ==
The Norisring 200 Miles combined several competitors from the World Championship as well as a majority of entrants from the German Supercup championship. The event was run as two separate races, each running for 100 miles (77 laps). The first race would consist of the entire field, and points for the German Supercup championship were awarded based on the results of this first race.

Cars which did not complete the first race, either due to accidents or mechanical failures, were not allowed to compete in the second race. Those which remained started in the same position in which they had finished the first race, and then completed the second 100-mile (160 km) race. The result of this race however did not count towards the Supercup. Instead, the laps totals from the two races were combined in order to determine an overall race winner, which earned points in the World Championship.

All teams consisted of two drivers, each of which ran one race apiece. Only the driver in the first race earned points in the Supercup, while both drivers earned points in the World Championship.

== Official results ==
Class winners in bold.

=== Race 1 ===
The 1987 Bilstein Cup and round two of the 1987 German Supercup.

Pos	Class	No	Team	Driver	Chassis – Engine	Laps
1	**C1**	**15**	**(United Kingdom) Liqui Moly Equipe**	**(Italy) Mauro Baldi**	**Porsche 962C**	**77**
2	C1	17	(West Germany) Porsche AG	(West Germany) Hans-Joachim Stuck	Porsche 962C	77
3	C1	3	(Switzerland) Brun Motorsport	(Argentina) Oscar Larrauri	Porsche 962C	75
4	C1	10	(West Germany) Porsche Kremer Racing	(West Germany) Volker Weidler	Porsche 962C	75
5	C1	8	(West Germany) Joest Racing	(West Germany) "John Winter"	Porsche 962C	75
6	**C2**	**111**	**(United Kingdom) Spice Engineering**	**(Spain) Fermín Vélez**	**Spice SE86C – Ford**	**73**
7	C1	72	(France) Primagaz Competition	(West Germany) Jürgen Lässig	Porsche 962C	73
8	C2	112	(United Kingdom) Spice Engineering	(United Kingdom) Ray Bellm	Spice SE87C – Ford	73
9	C2	102	(United Kingdom) Swiftair Ecurie Ecosse	(United Kingdom) Ray Mallock	Ecosse C286 – Ford	72
10	C2	101	(United Kingdom) Swiftair Ecurie Ecosse	(United Kingdom) Win Percy	Ecosse C286 – Ford	71
11	C2	106	(Italy) Kelmar Racing	(Italy) Maurizio Gellini	Tiga GC85 – Ford	71
12	C1	4	(United Kingdom) Silk Cut Jaguar	(United States) Eddie Cheever	Jaguar XJR-8	70
13	C1	1	(Switzerland) Brun Motorsport	(Switzerland) Walter Brun	Porsche 962C	69
14	C2	117	(Norway) Schanche Racing	(United Kingdom) Will Hoy	Argo JM19B – Zakspeed	59
15	C2	114	Tiga Ford Denmark	(Denmark) Thorkild Thyrring	Tiga GC287 – Ford	59
DSQ^{†}	C1	9	(West Germany) Blaupunkt Joest Racing	(West Germany) Frank Jelinski	Porsche 962C	76
DNF	C1	7	(West Germany) Blaupunkt Joest Racing	(France) Bob Wollek	Porsche 962C	76
DNF	C1	31	(West Germany) Victor-Dauer Racing	(West Germany) Jochen Dauer	Porsche 962C	75
DNF	C2	104	(West Germany) URD Junior Team	(West Germany) Rudi Seher	URD C81/2 – BMW	69
DNF	C1	2	(Switzerland) Brun Motorsport	(West Germany) Jochen Mass	Porsche 962C	47
DNF	C1	5	(United Kingdom) Silk Cut Jaguar	(Netherlands) Jan Lammers	Jaguar XJR-8	42
DNF	C1	61	(Switzerland) Formel Rennsportclub	(New Zealand) Mike Thackwell	Sauber C9 – Mercedes-Benz	40
DNF	C1	34	(Austria) Walter Lechner Racing	(Austria) Walter Lechner	Porsche 962C	29
DSQ^{‡}	C1	14	(Italy) Mussato Action Car	(Italy) Bruno Giacomelli	Lancia LC2 – Ferrari	26
DNF	C2	119	(West Germany) Karl-Heinz Becker	(West Germany) Karl-Heinz Becker	Lola T600 – BMW	13
DSQ*	C2	103	(United Kingdom) John Bartlett Racing	(New Zealand) Rob Wilson	Bardon DB1/2 – Ford	0
DSQ*	C2	121	(United Kingdom) GP Motorsport	(Greece) Costas Los	Tiga GC287 – Ford	0

† - #9 Blaupunkt Joest Racing was disqualified after Race 2 when the car was found to have an oversized fuel tank. Both runs were therefore disqualified.

‡ - #14 Mussato Action Car was disqualified during the race for using an external starter motor.

* - #103 John Bartlett Racing and #121 GP Motorsport were both disqualified for having started the race illegally.

=== Race 2 ===
Pos	Class	No	Team	Driver	Chassis – Engine	Laps
1	**C1**	**4**	**(United Kingdom) Silk Cut Jaguar**	**(Brazil) Raul Boesel**	**Jaguar XJR-8**	**77**
2	C1	15	(United Kingdom) Liqui Moly Equipe	(United Kingdom) Jonathan Palmer	Porsche 962C	77
3	C1	3	(Switzerland) Brun Motorsport	(West Germany) Jochen Mass	Porsche 962C	76
4	C1	8	(West Germany) Joest Racing	(Sweden) Stanley Dickens	Porsche 962C	75
5	C1	72	(France) Primagaz Competition	(France) Pierre Yver	Porsche 962C	72
6	**C2**	**102**	**(United Kingdom) Swiftair Ecurie Ecosse**	**(United Kingdom) David Leslie**	**Ecosse C286 – Ford**	**72**
7	C2	111	(United Kingdom) Spice Engineering	(United Kingdom) Gordon Spice	Spice SE86C – Ford	71
8	C2	114	Tiga Ford Denmark	(United Kingdom) John Sheldon	Tiga GC287 – Ford	70
9	C2	112	(United Kingdom) Spice Engineering	(United Kingdom) Nick Adams	Spice SE87C – Ford	70
10	C1	1	(Switzerland) Brun Motorsport	(Spain) Jesús Pareja	Porsche 962C	70
11	C2	106	(Italy) Kelmar Racing	(Italy) Ranieri Randaccio	Tiga GC85 – Ford	69
12	C2	117	(Norway) Schanche Racing	(United Kingdom) Martin Schanche	Argo JM19B – Zakspeed	64
NC	C1	10	(West Germany) Porsche Kremer Racing	(Denmark) Kris Nissen	Porsche 962C	75
DSQ^{†}	C1	9	(West Germany) Blaupunkt Joest Racing	(West Germany) Klaus Ludwig	Porsche 962C	77
DNF	C1	17	(West Germany) Porsche AG	(United Kingdom) Derek Bell	Porsche 962C	61
DNF	C2	101	(United Kingdom) Swiftair Ecurie Ecosse	(United Kingdom) Mike Wilds	Ecosse C286 – Ford	25

† - #9 Blaupunkt Joest Racing was disqualified after Race 2 when the car was found to have an oversized fuel tank. Both runs were therefore disqualified.

=== Overall results ===
Total laps from the two races combined for the ADAC Norisring Trophäe and round six of the World Sports-Prototype Championship. Drivers are listed in the order in which they raced or planned to race.

Pos	Class	No	Team	Drivers	Chassis	Tyre	Laps
Pos	Class	No	Team	Drivers	Engine	Tyre	Laps
1	**C1**	**15**	**(United Kingdom) Liqui Moly Equipe**	**(Italy) Mauro Baldi (United Kingdom) Jonathan Palmer**	**Porsche 962C GTi**	**G**	**154**
1	**C1**	**15**	**(United Kingdom) Liqui Moly Equipe**	**(Italy) Mauro Baldi (United Kingdom) Jonathan Palmer**	**Porsche Type-935 2.8L Turbo Flat-6**	**G**	**154**
2	C1	3	(Switzerland) Brun Motorsport	(Argentina) Oscar Larrauri (West Germany) Jochen Mass	Porsche 962C	**MI**	151
2	C1	3	(Switzerland) Brun Motorsport	(Argentina) Oscar Larrauri (West Germany) Jochen Mass	Porsche Type-935 2.8L Turbo Flat-6	**MI**	151
3	C1	8	(West Germany) Joest Racing	(West Germany) "John Winter" (Sweden) Stanley Dickens	Porsche 962C	**G**	150
3	C1	8	(West Germany) Joest Racing	(West Germany) "John Winter" (Sweden) Stanley Dickens	Porsche Type-935 2.8L Turbo Flat-6	**G**	150
4	C1	4	(United Kingdom) Silk Cut Jaguar	(United States) Eddie Cheever (Brazil) Raul Boesel	Jaguar XJR-8	**D**	147
4	C1	4	(United Kingdom) Silk Cut Jaguar	(United States) Eddie Cheever (Brazil) Raul Boesel	Jaguar 7.0L V12	**D**	147
5	C1	72	(France) Primagaz Competition	(West Germany) Jürgen Lässig (France) Pierre Yver	Porsche 962C	?	146
5	C1	72	(France) Primagaz Competition	(West Germany) Jürgen Lässig (France) Pierre Yver	Porsche Type-935 2.8L Turbo Flat-6	?	146
6	**C2**	**111**	**(United Kingdom) Spice Engineering**	**(Spain) Fermín Vélez (United Kingdom) Gordon Spice**	**Spice SE86C**	**A**	**145**
6	**C2**	**111**	**(United Kingdom) Spice Engineering**	**(Spain) Fermín Vélez (United Kingdom) Gordon Spice**	**Ford Cosworth DFL 3.3L V8**	**A**	**145**
7	C2	102	(United Kingdom) Swiftair Ecurie Ecosse	(United Kingdom) Ray Mallock (United Kingdom) David Leslie	Ecosse C286	**A**	144
7	C2	102	(United Kingdom) Swiftair Ecurie Ecosse	(United Kingdom) Ray Mallock (United Kingdom) David Leslie	Ford Cosworth DFL 3.3L V8	**A**	144
8	C2	112	(United Kingdom) Spice Engineering	(United Kingdom) Ray Bellm (United Kingdom) Nick Adams	Spice SE87C	**A**	143
8	C2	112	(United Kingdom) Spice Engineering	(United Kingdom) Ray Bellm (United Kingdom) Nick Adams	Ford Cosworth DFL 3.3L V8	**A**	143
9	C2	106	(Italy) Kelmar Racing	(Italy) Maurizio Gellini (Italy) Ranieri Randaccio	Tiga GC85	**A**	140
9	C2	106	(Italy) Kelmar Racing	(Italy) Maurizio Gellini (Italy) Ranieri Randaccio	Ford Cosworth DFL 3.3L V8	**A**	140
10	C1	1	(Switzerland) Brun Motorsport	(Switzerland) Walter Brun (Spain) Jesús Pareja	Porsche 962C	**MI**	139
10	C1	1	(Switzerland) Brun Motorsport	(Switzerland) Walter Brun (Spain) Jesús Pareja	Porsche Type-935 2.8L Turbo Flat-6	**MI**	139
11	C2	114	Tiga Ford Denmark	(Denmark) Thorkild Thyrring (United Kingdom) John Sheldon	Tiga GC287	**A**	128
11	C2	114	Tiga Ford Denmark	(Denmark) Thorkild Thyrring (United Kingdom) John Sheldon	Ford Cosworth BDT-E 2.3L Turbo I4	**A**	128
12	C2	117	(Norway) Schanche Racing	(United Kingdom) Will Hoy (Norway) Martin Schanche	Argo JM19B	**A**	125
12	C2	117	(Norway) Schanche Racing	(United Kingdom) Will Hoy (Norway) Martin Schanche	Zakspeed 1.9L Turbo I4	**A**	125
13 NC	C1	10	(West Germany) Porsche Kremer Racing	(West Germany) Volker Weidler (Denmark) Kris Nissen	Porsche 962C	**Y**	136
13 NC	C1	10	(West Germany) Porsche Kremer Racing	(West Germany) Volker Weidler (Denmark) Kris Nissen	Porsche Type-935 2.8L Turbo Flat-6	**Y**	136
14 DNF	C1	17	(West Germany) Porsche AG	(West Germany) Hans-Joachim Stuck (United Kingdom) Derek Bell	Porsche 962C	**D**	138
14 DNF	C1	17	(West Germany) Porsche AG	(West Germany) Hans-Joachim Stuck (United Kingdom) Derek Bell	Porsche Type-935 3.0L Turbo Flat-6	**D**	138
15 DNF	C2	101	(United Kingdom) Swiftair Ecurie Ecosse	(United Kingdom) Win Percy (United Kingdom) Mike Wilds	Ecosse C286	**A**	102
15 DNF	C2	101	(United Kingdom) Swiftair Ecurie Ecosse	(United Kingdom) Win Percy (United Kingdom) Mike Wilds	Ford Cosworth DFL 3.3L V8	**A**	102
16 DNF	C1	7	(West Germany) Blaupunkt Joest Racing	(France) Bob Wollek (West Germany) Klaus Ludwig	Porsche 962C	**G**	76
16 DNF	C1	7	(West Germany) Blaupunkt Joest Racing	(France) Bob Wollek (West Germany) Klaus Ludwig	Porsche Type-935 2.8L Turbo Flat-6	**G**	76
17 DNF	C1	31	(West Germany) Victor-Dauer Racing	(West Germany) Jochen Dauer (United Kingdom) Johnny Dumfries	Porsche 962C	**G**	75
17 DNF	C1	31	(West Germany) Victor-Dauer Racing	(West Germany) Jochen Dauer (United Kingdom) Johnny Dumfries	Porsche Type-935 2.8L Turbo Flat-6	**G**	75
18 DNF	C2	104	(West Germany) URD Junior Team	(West Germany) Rudi Seher (West Germany) Hellmut Mundas	URD C81/2	**A**	69
18 DNF	C2	104	(West Germany) URD Junior Team	(West Germany) Rudi Seher (West Germany) Hellmut Mundas	BMW M88 3.5L I6	**A**	69
19 DNF	C1	2	(Switzerland) Brun Motorsport	(West Germany) Jochen Mass (Argentina) Oscar Larrauri	Porsche 962C	**MI**	47
19 DNF	C1	2	(Switzerland) Brun Motorsport	(West Germany) Jochen Mass (Argentina) Oscar Larrauri	Porsche Type-935 2.8L Turbo Flat-6	**MI**	47
20 DNF	C1	5	(United Kingdom) Silk Cut Jaguar	(Netherlands) Jan Lammers (United Kingdom) John Watson	Jaguar XJR-8	**D**	42
20 DNF	C1	5	(United Kingdom) Silk Cut Jaguar	(Netherlands) Jan Lammers (United Kingdom) John Watson	Jaguar 7.0L V12	**D**	42
21 DNF	C1	61	(Switzerland) Formel Rennsportclub	(New Zealand) Mike Thackwell (West Germany) Manuel Reuter	Sauber C9	**MI**	40
21 DNF	C1	61	(Switzerland) Formel Rennsportclub	(New Zealand) Mike Thackwell (West Germany) Manuel Reuter	Mercedes-Benz M117 5.0L Turbo V8	**MI**	40
22 DNF	C1	34	(Austria) Walter Lechner Racing	(Austria) Walter Lechner (Austria) Ernst Franzmaier	Porsche 962C	**D**	29
22 DNF	C1	34	(Austria) Walter Lechner Racing	(Austria) Walter Lechner (Austria) Ernst Franzmaier	Porsche Type-935 2.8L Turbo Flat-6	**D**	29
23 DSQ	C1	14	(Italy) Mussato Action Car	(Italy) Bruno Giacomelli (Austria) Franz Konrad	Lancia LC2	?	26
23 DSQ	C1	14	(Italy) Mussato Action Car	(Italy) Bruno Giacomelli (Austria) Franz Konrad	Ferrari 308C 3.0L Turbo V8	?	26
24 DNF	C2	119	(West Germany) Karl-Heinz Becker	(West Germany) Karl-Heinz Becker (West Germany) Volker Cordlandwehr	Lola T600	?	13
24 DNF	C2	119	(West Germany) Karl-Heinz Becker	(West Germany) Karl-Heinz Becker (West Germany) Volker Cordlandwehr	BMW M88 3.5L V6	?	13
25 DSQ	C2	103	(United Kingdom) John Bartlett Racing	(New Zealand) Rob Wilson (United Kingdom) John Barlett	Bardon DB1/2	?	0
25 DSQ	C2	103	(United Kingdom) John Bartlett Racing	(New Zealand) Rob Wilson (United Kingdom) John Barlett	Ford Cosworth DFL 3.3L V8	?	0
26 DSQ	C2	121	(United Kingdom) GP Motorsport	(Greece) Costas Los (United Kingdom) Dudley Wood	Tiga GC287	**G**	0
26 DSQ	C2	121	(United Kingdom) GP Motorsport	(Greece) Costas Los (United Kingdom) Dudley Wood	Ford Cosworth DFL 3.3L V8	**G**	0
DSQ	C1	9	(West Germany) Blaupunkt Joest Racing	(West Germany) Frank Jelinski (West Germany) Klaus Ludwig	Porsche 962C	**G**	153
DSQ	C1	9	(West Germany) Blaupunkt Joest Racing	(West Germany) Frank Jelinski (West Germany) Klaus Ludwig	Porsche Type-935 2.8L Turbo Flat-6	**G**	153
DNQ	C2	200	(Belgium) Dahm Cars Racing	(West Germany) Olaf Manthey (West Germany) Dieter Heinzelmann	Argo JM19	**G**	-
DNQ	C2	200	(Belgium) Dahm Cars Racing	(West Germany) Olaf Manthey (West Germany) Dieter Heinzelmann	Porsche Type-930 3.2L Turbo Flat-6	**G**	-

== Statistics ==
- Pole Position (Race 1 only) - #17 Porsche AG - 0:47.070
- Average Speed - 163.898 km/h

World Sportscar Championship
Previous race: 1987 24 Hours of Le Mans	1987 season	Next race: 1987 1000 km of Brands Hatch

ADAC Supercup
Previous race: 1987 Supercup Nürburgring Eifelrennen	1987 season	Next race: 1987 Supercup Hockenheim
