= 1987 360 km of Jarama =

Layout of the Circuito Permanente Del Jarama (1980-1989)

The 1987 Gran Premio Fortuna was the opening round of the 1987 World Sports-Prototype Championship. It took place at the Circuito Permanente Del Jarama, Spain on March 22, 1987.

== Official results ==
Class winners in bold. Cars failing to complete 75% of the winner's distance marked as Not Classified (NC).

Pos	Class	No	Team	Drivers	Chassis	Tyre	Laps
Pos	Class	No	Team	Drivers	Engine	Tyre	Laps
1	**C1**	**5**	**(United Kingdom) Silk Cut Jaguar**	**(Netherlands) Jan Lammers (United Kingdom) John Watson**	**Jaguar XJR-8**	D	**109**
1	**C1**	**5**	**(United Kingdom) Silk Cut Jaguar**	**(Netherlands) Jan Lammers (United Kingdom) John Watson**	**Jaguar 7.0L V12**	D	**109**
2	C1	17	(Germany) Rothmans Porsche	(Germany) Hans-Joachim Stuck (United Kingdom) Derek Bell	Porsche 962C	D	109
2	C1	17	(Germany) Rothmans Porsche	(Germany) Hans-Joachim Stuck (United Kingdom) Derek Bell	Porsche Type-935 3.0L Turbo Flat-6	D	109
3	C1	4	(United Kingdom) Silk Cut Jaguar	(United States) Eddie Cheever (Brazil) Raul Boesel	Jaguar XJR-8	D	109
3	C1	4	(United Kingdom) Silk Cut Jaguar	(United States) Eddie Cheever (Brazil) Raul Boesel	Jaguar 7.0L V12	D	109
4	C1	10	(Germany) Kremer Porsche Racing	(Germany) Volker Weidler (Denmark) Kris Nissen	Porsche 962C	Y	106
4	C1	10	(Germany) Kremer Porsche Racing	(Germany) Volker Weidler (Denmark) Kris Nissen	Porsche Type-935 2.8L Turbo Flat-6	Y	106
5	C1	3	(Switzerland) Brun Motorsport	(Spain) Jesús Pareja (Argentina) Oscar Larrauri	Porsche 962C	MI	106
5	C1	3	(Switzerland) Brun Motorsport	(Spain) Jesús Pareja (Argentina) Oscar Larrauri	Porsche Type-935 2.8L Turbo Flat-6	MI	106
6	C1	2	(Switzerland) Brun Motorsport	(Italy) Massimo Sigala (Italy) Gianfranco Brancatelli	Porsche 962C	MI	105
6	C1	2	(Switzerland) Brun Motorsport	(Italy) Massimo Sigala (Italy) Gianfranco Brancatelli	Porsche Type-935 2.8L Turbo Flat-6	MI	105
7	C1	1	(Switzerland) Brun Motorsport	(Switzerland) Walter Brun (Germany) Frank Jelinski	Porsche 962C	MI	105
7	C1	1	(Switzerland) Brun Motorsport	(Switzerland) Walter Brun (Germany) Frank Jelinski	Porsche Type-935 2.8L Turbo Flat-6	MI	105
8	C1	15	(United Kingdom) Britten – Lloyd Racing	(Italy) Mauro Baldi (United Kingdom) Jonathan Palmer	Porsche 962C GTi	G	104
8	C1	15	(United Kingdom) Britten – Lloyd Racing	(Italy) Mauro Baldi (United Kingdom) Jonathan Palmer	Porsche Type-935 2.8L Turbo Flat-6	G	104
9	**C2**	**111**	**(United Kingdom) Spice Engineering**	**(United Kingdom) Gordon Spice (Spain) Fermín Vélez**	**Spice SE86C**	A	**100**
9	**C2**	**111**	**(United Kingdom) Spice Engineering**	**(United Kingdom) Gordon Spice (Spain) Fermín Vélez**	**Ford Cosworth DFL 3.3L V8**	A	**100**
10	C1	11	(Germany) Kremer Porsche Racing	(Spain) Emilio de Villota (Spain) Paco Romero	Porsche 962C	Y	99
10	C1	11	(Germany) Kremer Porsche Racing	(Spain) Emilio de Villota (Spain) Paco Romero	Porsche Type-935 2.8L Turbo Flat-6	Y	99
11	C2	101	(United Kingdom) Ecurie Ecosse	(United Kingdom) David Leslie (United Kingdom) Ray Mallock	Ecosse C286	A	99
11	C2	101	(United Kingdom) Ecurie Ecosse	(United Kingdom) David Leslie (United Kingdom) Ray Mallock	Ford Cosworth DFL 3.3L V8	A	99
12	C2	114	Team Tiga Ford Denmark	(Denmark) Thorkild Thyrring (Sweden) Leif Lindström	Tiga GC287	A	98
12	C2	114	Team Tiga Ford Denmark	(Denmark) Thorkild Thyrring (Sweden) Leif Lindström	Ford Cosworth BDT-E 2.1L Turbo I4	A	98
13	C2	115	(United Kingdom) ADA Engineering	(United Kingdom) Mike Wilds (United Kingdom) Ian Harrower	Gebhardt JC843	A	98
13	C2	115	(United Kingdom) ADA Engineering	(United Kingdom) Mike Wilds (United Kingdom) Ian Harrower	Ford Cosworth DFL 3.3L V8	A	98
14	C2	104	(Germany) URD Junior Team	(Germany) Rudi Seher (Germany) Hellmut Mundas	URD C81/2	A	83
14	C2	104	(Germany) URD Junior Team	(Germany) Rudi Seher (Germany) Hellmut Mundas	BMW M88 3.5L I6	A	83
15 DNF	C2	117	(Norway) Team Lucky Strike Schanche	(Norway) Martin Schanche (United Kingdom) Will Hoy	Argo JM19B	A	81
15 DNF	C2	117	(Norway) Team Lucky Strike Schanche	(Norway) Martin Schanche (United Kingdom) Will Hoy	Zakspeed 1.9L Turbo I4	A	81
16 DNF	C2	198	(United Kingdom) Cosmik Roy Baker Racing	(Italy) Pasquale Barberio (Greece) Costas Los	Tiga GC286	A	81
16 DNF	C2	198	(United Kingdom) Cosmik Roy Baker Racing	(Italy) Pasquale Barberio (Greece) Costas Los	Ford Cosworth DFL 3.3L V8	A	81
17 DNF	C2	123	(United Kingdom) Charles Ivey Racing	(United Kingdom) Mark Newby (United Kingdom) Dudley Wood	Tiga GC287	A	4
17 DNF	C2	123	(United Kingdom) Charles Ivey Racing	(United Kingdom) Mark Newby (United Kingdom) Dudley Wood	Porsche Type-935 2.6L Turbo Flat-6	A	4
DNS	C2	116	(Italy) Technoracing	(Italy) Luigi Taverna (Switzerland) Jean-Pierre Frey	Alba AR3	A	-
DNS	C2	116	(Italy) Technoracing	(Italy) Luigi Taverna (Switzerland) Jean-Pierre Frey	Ford Cosworth DFL 3.3L V8	A	-

== Statistics ==
- Pole Position - #4 Silk Cut Jaguar - 1:14.541
- Fastest Lap - #17 Rothmans Porsche - 1:17.871
- Average Speed - 144.464 km/h

World Sportscar Championship
Previous race: None	1987 season	Next race: 1987 1000 km of Jerez
