= Spice SE87C =

Sports prototype race car

- Category: Group C2; IMSA GTP Lights
- Designer(s): Graham Humphrys

Technical specifications
- Chassis: Aluminum honeycomb monocoque covered in carbon fiber composite and kevlar body
- Suspension (front): double wishbones, coil springs over shock absorbers, anti-roll bar
- Suspension (rear): double wishbones, rocker-actuated coil springs over shock absorbers, anti-roll bar
- Engine: Ford-Cosworth DFL/DFZ 3.3–3.9 L (201.4–238.0 cu in) 90° V8 DOHC naturally-aspirated mid-engined Ford SHO 3.4 L (207.5 cu in) 90° V8 DOHC naturally-aspirated mid-engined Super Duty 3.0 L (183.1 cu in) I4 OHV naturally-aspirated mid-engined
- Transmission: Hewland DGB 5-speed manual
- Power: 350–540 hp (260–400 kW)
- Tires: Avon; Goodyear

Competition history
Entries	Podiums
46	1

The Spice SE87C is a Group C2 and IMSA GTP Lights sports prototype race car, designed, developed, and built by British manufacturer, Spice Engineering, for sports car racing in the World Sportscar Championship, in 1987.

== Racing history ==
=== 1987 ===
The Spice SE87C was entered by the Spice Engineering team in a few rounds of the World Sportscar Championship as well as the German Interserie Championship.

At the end of the season, the GP Motorsport team took possession of the car and took part in a few races in South Africa.

=== 1988 ===
The Spice SE87C has again been entered by the GP Motorsport team in the World Sportscar Championship. It encountered numerous reliability problems and retired seven times out of the 11 rounds constituting the championship. The car's best performance was a sixth-place finish by Costas Los and Wayne Taylor in the standings at the Brands Hatch 1,000 Kilometers.

As in the previous season, it will end the year by participating in a non-championship race in South Africa.

=== 1989 ===
As in the previous season, the Spice SE87C was again entered by the GP Motorsport team in the World Sportscar Championship as well as the German Interserie Championship rounds. The format of the World Sportscar Championship rounds has changed to 480 km races instead of the previous 1,000 km. In this context, the car saw the checkered flag more frequently than in previous seasons but the best performance of the car was seventeenth place in the 480 kilometers of Brands Hatch at the hands of Dudley Wood and Philippe de Henning. For the24 Hours of Le Mans, a non-championship race that year, it finished in the seventeenth position in the general classification.

=== 1990 ===
For this new season, the activity of the Spice SE87C will have been limited compared to previous years. In the World Sportscar Championship. She only participated in the round of Silverstone which she could not finish due to retirement. It also took part in the 24 Hours of Le Mans, a non-championship race again that year, in which it finished in its twenty-seventh position overall.

=== 1993 ===
After a few years of inactivity, the Spice SE87C was hired by the Canadian team Miroslav Jonak to participate in the IMSA GT Championship.
