= Dominique Lacaud =

French racing driver

Dominique Lacaud (born 4 February 1952 in Issoudun) is a French former racing driver.
