= Dudley Wood =

British racing driver

Dudley Wood (born 9 July 1946) is a British former racing driver.

Wood began his professional career in the World Championship for Drivers and Makes in 1981 and finished 13th in points. He then drove in the World Sportscar Championship from 1982 to 1990. He drove in the 24 Hours of Le Mans in 1989 and 1990 driving a Spice SE87C for GP Motorsport/Roy Baker Racing, finishing third and fourth in the C2 class those two years, respectively.

== 24 Hours of Le Mans results ==
Year	Team	Co-Drivers	Car	Class	Laps	Pos.	Class Pos.
1980	(United Kingdom) Charles Ivey Racing	(United Kingdom) Pete Lovett (United Kingdom) John Cooper	Porsche 935 K3	Gr.5	158	DNF	DNF
1981	(Belgium) Claude Bourgoignie (United Kingdom) Charles Ivey Racing	(Belgium) Claude Bourgoignie (United Kingdom) John Cooper	Porsche 935 K3	Gr.5	330	4th	4th
1983	(United Kingdom) Grid Motor Racing Ltd.	(United States) Fred Stiff (United States) Ray Ratcliff	Grid Plaza S1	C	69	DNF	DNF
1984	(United Kingdom) C.A.M.S.	(United Kingdom) John Cooper (United Kingdom) Barry Robinson	Grid Plaza S2	C	10	DNF	DNF
1985	(United Kingdom) John Fitzpatrick Racing	(United Kingdom) Kenny Acheson (France) Jean-Louis Schlesser	Porsche 962C	C1	0	DNQ	DNQ
1986	(Germany) Obermaier Racing	(Germany) Jürgen Lässig (Italy) Fulvio Ballabio	Porsche 956	C1	344	5th	5th
1987	(United Kingdom) Cosmik GP Motorsport	(Greece) Costas Los (United States) Tom Hessert	Tiga GC287	C2	274	9th	3rd
1988	(United Kingdom) Team Obermaier	(Germany) Jürgen Lässig (France) Pierre Yver	Porsche 962C	C1	356	11th	11th
1989	(United Kingdom) Roy Baker Racing	(United Kingdom) Evan Clements (France) Philippe de Henning	Spice SE87C	C2	303	17th	3rd
1990	(United Kingdom) GP Motorsport	(United Kingdom) Richard Jones (United States) Stephen Hynes	Spice SE87C	C2	260	27th	4th
