= Thorkild Thyrring =

Danish racing driver (born 1946)

Thorkild Thyrring (born 24 October 1946) is a Danish auto racing driver. He drove several times in the Le Mans 24 hour race, most recently in 2005 and 2006 for Sebah Automotive Ltd in a Porsche 911 GT3. His best result in the race was finishing nineteenth overall in 2005. He previously raced a Lotus in 1993 and 1994 and a Corvette in 1995. His team had failed to finish the race in all of these previous attempts.

Thyrring competed in the 1992 British Touring Car Championship for the works Toyota Team, but was dropped after half a season due to poor results, finishing in seventeenth place. He has also raced in the Danish Touring Car Championship in 2000 with a Nissan Primera. He won three British GT Championship titles between 1993 and 1995. Between his Danish and international victories, he has the most wins of any Danish racing driver.

== Racing record ==
=== Complete British Touring Car Championship results ===
(key) (Races in bold indicate pole position) (Races in italics indicate fastest lap)

Year	Team	Car	1	2	3	4	5	6	7	8	9	10	11	12	13	14	15	DC	Pts
1992	Team Securicor ICS Toyota	Toyota Carina	SIL; Ret	THR; Ret	OUL; Ret	SNE; 7	BRH; 10	DON; 1; 18	DON; 2 Ret	SIL	KNO; 1	KNO; 2	PEM	BRH; 1	BRH; 2	DON	SIL	17th	5

=== Complete 24 Hours of Le Mans results ===
Year	Team	Co-Drivers	Car	Class	Laps	Pos.	Class Pos.
1993	(United Kingdom) Lotus Sport (United Kingdom) Chamberlain Engineering	(Japan) Yojiro Terada (United Kingdom) Peter Hardman	Lotus Esprit S300	GT	92	DNF	DNF
1994	(United Kingdom) Lotus Sport (United Kingdom) Chamberlain Engineering	(Netherlands) Klaas Zwart (Germany) Andreas Fuchs	Lotus Esprit S300	GT2	28	DNF	DNF
1995	(United Kingdom) Agusta Racing Team	(Italy) Almo Coppelli (France) Patrick Bourdais	Callaway Corvette Supernatural	GT2	96	DNF	DNF
2005	(United Kingdom) Sebah Automotive Ltd.	(Denmark) Lars-Erik Nielsen (Germany) Pierre Ehret	Porsche 911 GT3-RSR	GT2	307	19th	5th
2006	(United Kingdom) Sebah Automotive Ltd.	(Germany) Christian Ried (France) Xavier Pompidou	Porsche 911 GT3-RSR	GT2	256	DNF	DNF
