= 1988 World Sportscar Championship =

Racing tournament

Seasons
- ← 1987 1989 →

The 1988 World Sportscar Championship season was the 36th season of FIA World Sportscar Championship motor racing. It featured the 1988 FIA World Sports Prototype Championship which was open to FIA Group C and Group C2 cars and to IMSA GTP, GTX, GTO and GTU cars. The championship was contested over an eleven race series which ran from 6 March to 20 November 1988.

Martin Brundle was awarded the World Sports Prototype Championship for Drivers, Gordon Spice and Ray Bellm jointly won the FIA Cup for Group C2 Drivers, Silk Cut Jaguar was awarded the World Sports Prototype Championship for Teams and Spice Engineering won the FIA Cup for Group C2 Teams.

231 drivers started in at least 1 (one) Grand Prix in the 1988 FIA World Sports Prototype Championship.

== Schedule ==
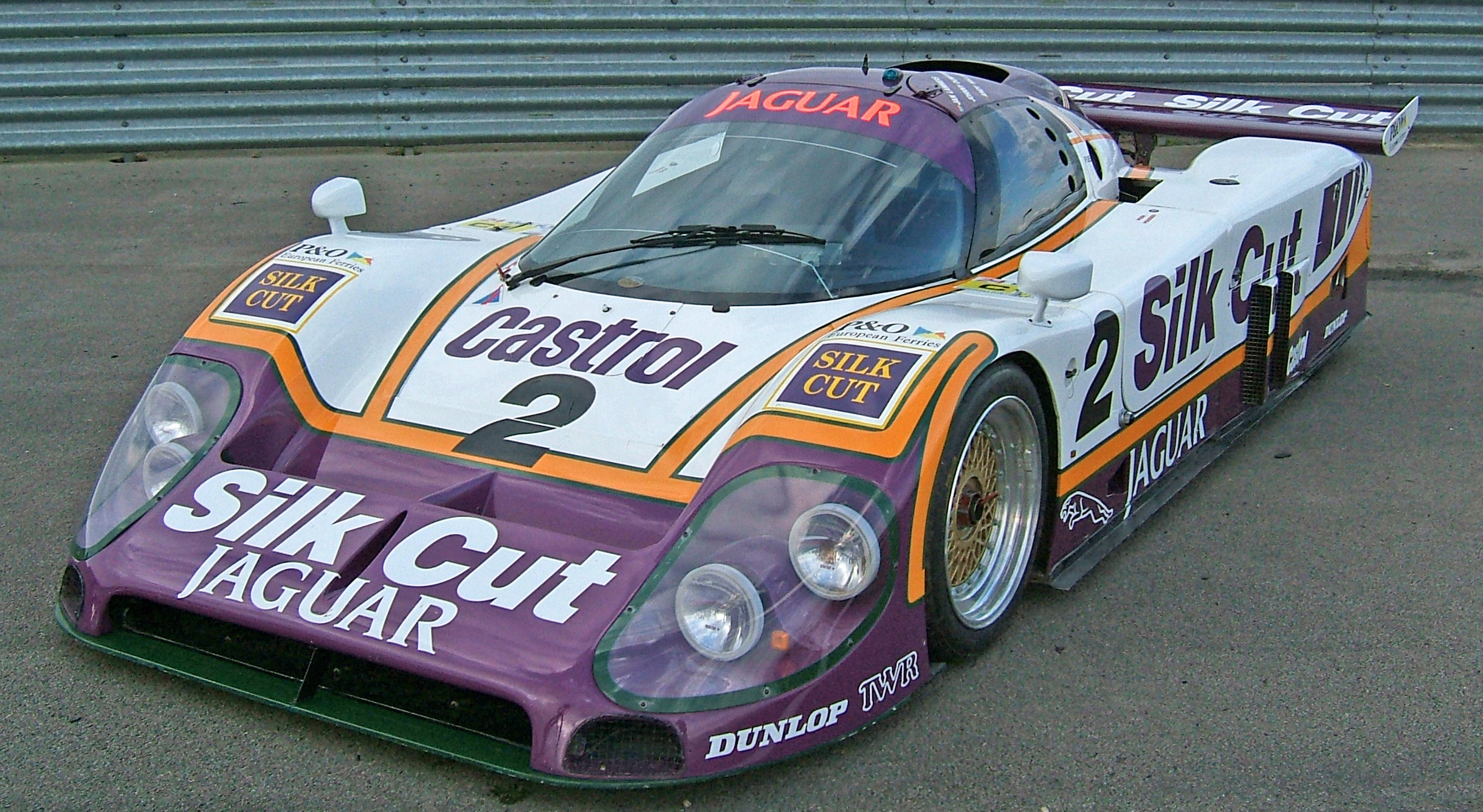
Jaguar won the Teams Championship with its XJR9 model

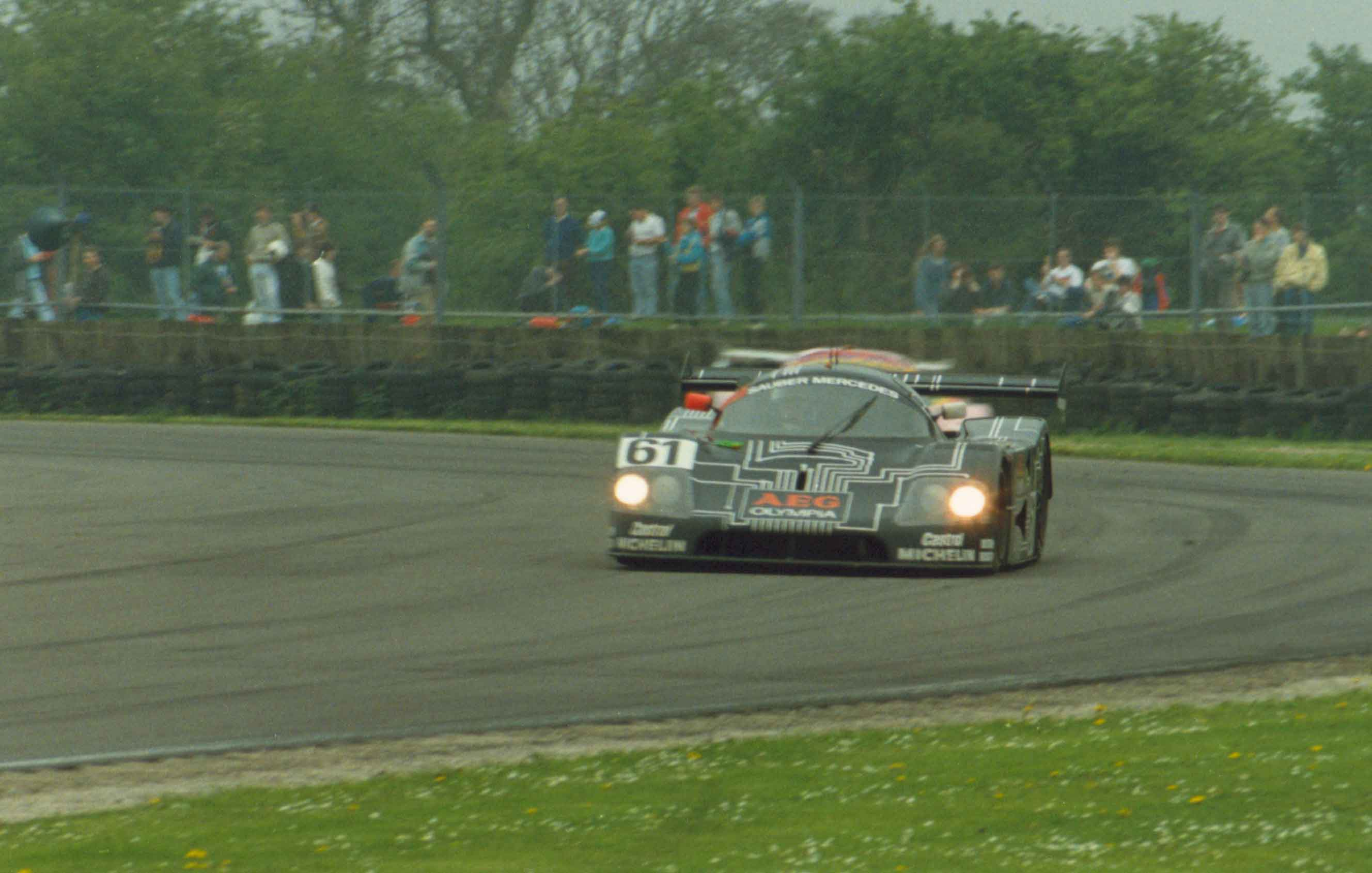
Sauber Mercedes placed second in the Teams Championship

Rnd	Race	Circuit	Date
1	(Spain) 800 km Jerez	Circuito Permanente de Jerez	6 March
2	(Spain) 360 km Jarama	Circuito Permanente Del Jarama	13 March
3	(Italy) 1000km Monza	Autodromo Nazionale Monza	10 April
4	(United Kingdom) Autosport 1000 km Silverstone	Silverstone Circuit	8 May
5	(France) 24 Hours of Le Mans	Circuit de la Sarthe	11 June; 12 June
6	(Czechoslovakia) Grand Prix ČSSR	Autodrom Brno	10 July
7	(United Kingdom) 1000 km Brands Hatch	Brands Hatch	24 July
8	(Germany) ADAC 1000km Nürburgring	Nürburgring	4 September
9	(Belgium) 1000km Spa	Circuit de Spa-Francorchamps	18 September
10	(Japan) Fuji 1000 km	Fuji Speedway	9 October
11	(Australia) Lucas Supersprint	Sandown Park	20 November

== Entries ==
=== Group C1 ===
Entrant	Car	Engine	Tyre	No.	Drivers	Rounds
(United Kingdom) Silk Cut Jaguar	Jaguar XJR-9	Jaguar 7.0 L V12	D	1	(United Kingdom) Martin Brundle	All
(United Kingdom) Silk Cut Jaguar	Jaguar XJR-9	Jaguar 7.0 L V12	D	1	(United States) Eddie Cheever	1–4, 8–11
(United Kingdom) Silk Cut Jaguar	Jaguar XJR-9	Jaguar 7.0 L V12	D	1	(Denmark) John Nielsen	5–7, 10
(United Kingdom) Silk Cut Jaguar	Jaguar XJR-9	Jaguar 7.0 L V12	D	1	(United Kingdom) Andy Wallace	7
(United Kingdom) Silk Cut Jaguar	Jaguar XJR-9	Jaguar 7.0 L V12	D	1	(United Kingdom) Johnny Dumfries	9
(United Kingdom) Silk Cut Jaguar	Jaguar XJR-9	Jaguar 7.0 L V12	D	2	(Netherlands) Jan Lammers	All
(United Kingdom) Silk Cut Jaguar	Jaguar XJR-9	Jaguar 7.0 L V12	D	2	(United Kingdom) Johnny Dumfries	All
(United Kingdom) Silk Cut Jaguar	Jaguar XJR-9	Jaguar 7.0 L V12	D	2	(United Kingdom) Andy Wallace	5
(United Kingdom) Silk Cut Jaguar	Jaguar XJR-9	Jaguar 7.0 L V12	D	2	(United Kingdom) Martin Brundle	7, 9
(United Kingdom) Silk Cut Jaguar	Jaguar XJR-9	Jaguar 7.0 L V12	D	3	(United Kingdom) John Watson	1–2, 5, 7
(United Kingdom) Silk Cut Jaguar	Jaguar XJR-9	Jaguar 7.0 L V12	D	3	(Denmark) John Nielsen	1–2
(United Kingdom) Silk Cut Jaguar	Jaguar XJR-9	Jaguar 7.0 L V12	D	3	(United Kingdom) Andy Wallace	1
(United Kingdom) Silk Cut Jaguar	Jaguar XJR-9	Jaguar 7.0 L V12	D	3	(Brazil) Raul Boesel	5
(United Kingdom) Silk Cut Jaguar	Jaguar XJR-9	Jaguar 7.0 L V12	D	3	(France) Henri Pescarolo	5
(United Kingdom) Silk Cut Jaguar	Jaguar XJR-9	Jaguar 7.0 L V12	D	3	(United States) Davy Jones	7
(United Kingdom) Silk Cut Jaguar	Jaguar XJR-9	Jaguar 7.0 L V12	D	3	(United Kingdom) Martin Brundle	7
(United States) Silk Cut Jaguar	Jaguar XJR-9	Jaguar 7.0 L V12	D	21	(United States) Danny Sullivan	5
(United States) Silk Cut Jaguar	Jaguar XJR-9	Jaguar 7.0 L V12	D	21	(United States) Davy Jones	5
(United States) Silk Cut Jaguar	Jaguar XJR-9	Jaguar 7.0 L V12	D	21	(United States) Price Cobb	5
(United States) Silk Cut Jaguar	Jaguar XJR-9	Jaguar 7.0 L V12	D	22	(United States) Kevin Cogan	5
(United States) Silk Cut Jaguar	Jaguar XJR-9	Jaguar 7.0 L V12	D	22	(Republic of Ireland) Derek Daly	5
(United States) Silk Cut Jaguar	Jaguar XJR-9	Jaguar 7.0 L V12	D	22	(Australia) Larry Perkins	5
(Switzerland) Brun Motorsport	Porsche 962C	Porsche Type-935/82 3.0 L Turbo Flat-6	M	4	(Switzerland) Walter Brun	1–3, 8–9
(Switzerland) Brun Motorsport	Porsche 962C	Porsche Type-935/82 3.0 L Turbo Flat-6	M	4	(Italy) Massimo Sigala	1–2
(Switzerland) Brun Motorsport	Porsche 962C	Porsche Type-935/82 3.0 L Turbo Flat-6	M	4	(Argentina) Oscar Larrauri	1, 9
(Switzerland) Brun Motorsport	Porsche 962C	Porsche Type-935/82 3.0 L Turbo Flat-6	M	4	(West Germany) Uwe Schäfer	3
(Switzerland) Brun Motorsport	Porsche 962C	Porsche Type-935/82 3.0 L Turbo Flat-6	M	4	(West Germany) Manuel Reuter	5, 9
(Switzerland) Brun Motorsport	Porsche 962C	Porsche Type-935/82 3.0 L Turbo Flat-6	M	4	(Austria) Walter Lechner	5
(Switzerland) Brun Motorsport	Porsche 962C	Porsche Type-935/82 3.0 L Turbo Flat-6	M	4	(Switzerland) Franz Hunkeler	5
(Switzerland) Brun Motorsport	Porsche 962C	Porsche Type-935/82 3.0 L Turbo Flat-6	M	4	(Belgium) Harald Huysman	8
(Switzerland) Brun Motorsport	Porsche 962C	Porsche Type-935/82 3.0 L Turbo Flat-6	M	5	(West Germany) Manuel Reuter	1–3, 8–9
(Switzerland) Brun Motorsport	Porsche 962C	Porsche Type-935/82 3.0 L Turbo Flat-6	M	5	(West Germany) Uwe Schäfer	1–2, 5, 8
(Switzerland) Brun Motorsport	Porsche 962C	Porsche Type-935/82 3.0 L Turbo Flat-6	M	5	(Spain) Jésus Pareja	3, 5
(Switzerland) Brun Motorsport	Porsche 962C	Porsche Type-935/82 3.0 L Turbo Flat-6	M	5	(Italy) Massimo Sigala	5
(Switzerland) Brun Motorsport	Porsche 962C	Porsche Type-935/82 3.0 L Turbo Flat-6	M	5	(Argentina) Oscar Larrauri	8–9
(Switzerland) Brun Motorsport	Porsche 962C	Porsche Type-935/82 3.0 L Turbo Flat-6	M	5	(Switzerland) Walter Brun	9
(Switzerland) Brun Motorsport	Porsche 962C	Porsche Type-935/82 3.0 L Turbo Flat-6	M	6	(Argentina) Oscar Larrauri	1–3
(Switzerland) Brun Motorsport	Porsche 962C	Porsche Type-935/82 3.0 L Turbo Flat-6	M	6	(Spain) Jésus Pareja	1–2, 8
(Switzerland) Brun Motorsport	Porsche 962C	Porsche Type-935/82 3.0 L Turbo Flat-6	M	6	(Switzerland) Walter Brun	1
(Switzerland) Brun Motorsport	Porsche 962C	Porsche Type-935/82 3.0 L Turbo Flat-6	M	6	(Italy) Massimo Sigala	3
(Switzerland) Brun Motorsport	Porsche 962C	Porsche Type-935/82 3.0 L Turbo Flat-6	M	6	(West Germany) Manuel Reuter	8
(Switzerland) Brun Motorsport	Porsche 962C	Porsche Type-935/82 3.0 L Turbo Flat-6	M	6	(West Germany) Uwe Schäfer	8
(West Germany) Blaupunkt-Joest Racing (West Germany) Joest Racing GmbH	Porsche 962C	Porsche Type-935/79 2.8 L Turbo Flat-6; Porsche Type-935/82 3.0 L Turbo Flat-6	G	7	(France) Bob Wollek	1–4, 6–10
(West Germany) Blaupunkt-Joest Racing (West Germany) Joest Racing GmbH	Porsche 962C	Porsche Type-935/79 2.8 L Turbo Flat-6; Porsche Type-935/82 3.0 L Turbo Flat-6	G	7	(West Germany) Klaus Ludwig	1–3, 7
(West Germany) Blaupunkt-Joest Racing (West Germany) Joest Racing GmbH	Porsche 962C	Porsche Type-935/79 2.8 L Turbo Flat-6; Porsche Type-935/82 3.0 L Turbo Flat-6	G	7	(United Kingdom) David Hobbs	4–5
(West Germany) Blaupunkt-Joest Racing (West Germany) Joest Racing GmbH	Porsche 962C	Porsche Type-935/79 2.8 L Turbo Flat-6; Porsche Type-935/82 3.0 L Turbo Flat-6	G	7	(France) Philippe Streiff	4
(West Germany) Blaupunkt-Joest Racing (West Germany) Joest Racing GmbH	Porsche 962C	Porsche Type-935/79 2.8 L Turbo Flat-6; Porsche Type-935/82 3.0 L Turbo Flat-6	G	7	(Belgium) Didier Theys	5
(West Germany) Blaupunkt-Joest Racing (West Germany) Joest Racing GmbH	Porsche 962C	Porsche Type-935/79 2.8 L Turbo Flat-6; Porsche Type-935/82 3.0 L Turbo Flat-6	G	7	(Austria) Franz Konrad	5
(West Germany) Blaupunkt-Joest Racing (West Germany) Joest Racing GmbH	Porsche 962C	Porsche Type-935/79 2.8 L Turbo Flat-6; Porsche Type-935/82 3.0 L Turbo Flat-6	G	7	(Sweden) Stanley Dickens	5
(West Germany) Blaupunkt-Joest Racing (West Germany) Joest Racing GmbH	Porsche 962C	Porsche Type-935/79 2.8 L Turbo Flat-6; Porsche Type-935/82 3.0 L Turbo Flat-6	G	7	(West Germany) "John Winter"	6
(West Germany) Blaupunkt-Joest Racing (West Germany) Joest Racing GmbH	Porsche 962C	Porsche Type-935/79 2.8 L Turbo Flat-6; Porsche Type-935/82 3.0 L Turbo Flat-6	G	7	(Italy) Paolo Barilla	8–9
(West Germany) Blaupunkt-Joest Racing (West Germany) Joest Racing GmbH	Porsche 962C	Porsche Type-935/79 2.8 L Turbo Flat-6; Porsche Type-935/82 3.0 L Turbo Flat-6	G	7	(West Germany) Harald Grohs	10
(West Germany) Blaupunkt-Joest Racing (West Germany) Joest Racing GmbH	Porsche 962C	Porsche Type-935/79 2.8 L Turbo Flat-6; Porsche Type-935/82 3.0 L Turbo Flat-6	G	8	(West Germany) Frank Jelinski	1–5, 7–10
(West Germany) Blaupunkt-Joest Racing (West Germany) Joest Racing GmbH	Porsche 962C	Porsche Type-935/79 2.8 L Turbo Flat-6; Porsche Type-935/82 3.0 L Turbo Flat-6	G	8	(West Germany) "John Winter"	1–5, 7–10
(West Germany) Blaupunkt-Joest Racing (West Germany) Joest Racing GmbH	Porsche 962C	Porsche Type-935/79 2.8 L Turbo Flat-6; Porsche Type-935/82 3.0 L Turbo Flat-6	G	8	(Sweden) Stanley Dickens	4–5
(West Germany) Blaupunkt-Joest Racing (West Germany) Joest Racing GmbH	Porsche 962C	Porsche Type-935/79 2.8 L Turbo Flat-6; Porsche Type-935/82 3.0 L Turbo Flat-6	G	8	(Austria) Franz Konrad	6
(West Germany) Blaupunkt-Joest Racing (West Germany) Joest Racing GmbH	Porsche 962C	Porsche Type-935/79 2.8 L Turbo Flat-6; Porsche Type-935/82 3.0 L Turbo Flat-6	G	8	(West Germany) Jürgen Barth	6
(West Germany) Blaupunkt-Joest Racing (West Germany) Joest Racing GmbH	Porsche 962C	Porsche Type-935/79 2.8 L Turbo Flat-6; Porsche Type-935/82 3.0 L Turbo Flat-6	G	8	(West Germany) Klaus Ludwig	7
(West Germany) Porsche Kremer Racing	Porsche 962C; Porsche 962CK6	Porsche Type-935/82 3.0 L Turbo Flat-6	Y	10	(West Germany) Volker Weidler	2–3, 8, 10
(West Germany) Porsche Kremer Racing	Porsche 962C; Porsche 962CK6	Porsche Type-935/82 3.0 L Turbo Flat-6	Y	10	(Denmark) Kris Nissen	2, 4
(West Germany) Porsche Kremer Racing	Porsche 962C; Porsche 962CK6	Porsche Type-935/82 3.0 L Turbo Flat-6	Y	10	(Italy) Bruno Giacomelli	3, 5, 8
(West Germany) Porsche Kremer Racing	Porsche 962C; Porsche 962CK6	Porsche Type-935/82 3.0 L Turbo Flat-6	Y	10	(West Germany) Harald Grohs	4
(West Germany) Porsche Kremer Racing	Porsche 962C; Porsche 962CK6	Porsche Type-935/82 3.0 L Turbo Flat-6	Y	10	(Japan) Kunimitsu Takahashi	5
(West Germany) Porsche Kremer Racing	Porsche 962C; Porsche 962CK6	Porsche Type-935/82 3.0 L Turbo Flat-6	Y	10	(Japan) Hideki Okada	5
(West Germany) Porsche Kremer Racing	Porsche 962C; Porsche 962CK6	Porsche Type-935/82 3.0 L Turbo Flat-6	Y	10	(West Germany) Manuel Reuter	10
(West Germany) Leyton House with Porsche Kremer	Porsche 962C; Porsche 962CK6	Porsche Type-935/82 3.0 L Turbo Flat-6	Y B	11	(Denmark) Kris Nissen	5
(West Germany) Leyton House with Porsche Kremer	Porsche 962C; Porsche 962CK6	Porsche Type-935/82 3.0 L Turbo Flat-6	Y B	11	(South Africa) George Fouché	5
(West Germany) Leyton House with Porsche Kremer	Porsche 962C; Porsche 962CK6	Porsche Type-935/82 3.0 L Turbo Flat-6	Y B	11	(West Germany) Harald Grohs	5
(West Germany) Leyton House with Porsche Kremer	Porsche 962C; Porsche 962CK6	Porsche Type-935/82 3.0 L Turbo Flat-6	Y B	11	(Argentina) Oscar Larrauri	10
(West Germany) Leyton House with Porsche Kremer	Porsche 962C; Porsche 962CK6	Porsche Type-935/82 3.0 L Turbo Flat-6	Y B	11	(Italy) Bruno Giacomelli	10
(Japan) Leyton House Racing Team	Porsche 962C	Porsche Type-935/82 3.0 L Turbo Flat-6	B	28	(Japan) Naoki Nagasaka	10
(Japan) Leyton House Racing Team	Porsche 962C	Porsche Type-935/82 3.0 L Turbo Flat-6	B	28	(Japan) Kaoru Hoshino	10
(Japan) Leyton House Racing Team	Porsche 962C	Porsche Type-935/82 3.0 L Turbo Flat-6	B	28	(Japan) Masahiko Kageyama	10
(France) Primagaz Compétition	Cougar C20B	Porsche Type-935/79 2.8 L Turbo Flat-6	M	13	(France) Pierre-Henri Raphanel	3, 5
(France) Primagaz Compétition	Cougar C20B	Porsche Type-935/79 2.8 L Turbo Flat-6	M	13	(Italy) Roberto Ravaglia	3
(France) Primagaz Compétition	Cougar C20B	Porsche Type-935/79 2.8 L Turbo Flat-6	M	13	(France) Michel Ferté	5
(France) Courage Compétition	Cougar C22	Porsche Type-935/79 2.8 L Turbo Flat-6	M	32	(France) François Migault	5
(France) Courage Compétition	Cougar C22	Porsche Type-935/79 2.8 L Turbo Flat-6	M	32	(France) Paul Belmondo	5
(France) Courage Compétition	Cougar C22	Porsche Type-935/79 2.8 L Turbo Flat-6	M	32	(Japan) Ukyo Katayama	5
(United Kingdom) Richard Lloyd Racing	Porsche 962C GTi	Porsche Type-935/82 3.0 L Turbo Flat-6	G	14	(United Kingdom) Derek Bell	1–2, 4, 9
(United Kingdom) Richard Lloyd Racing	Porsche 962C GTi	Porsche Type-935/82 3.0 L Turbo Flat-6	G	14	(United Kingdom) James Weaver	1–2
(United Kingdom) Richard Lloyd Racing	Porsche 962C GTi	Porsche Type-935/82 3.0 L Turbo Flat-6	G	14	(United Kingdom) Tiff Needell	4
(United Kingdom) Richard Lloyd Racing	Porsche 962C GTi	Porsche Type-935/82 3.0 L Turbo Flat-6	G	14	(United Kingdom) Martin Donnelly	8–9
(United Kingdom) Richard Lloyd Racing	Porsche 962C GTi	Porsche Type-935/82 3.0 L Turbo Flat-6	G	14	(United Kingdom) David Hobbs	8
(West Germany) Victor Dauer Racing	Porsche 962C	Porsche Type-935/82 3.0 L Turbo Flat-6	G	16	(West Germany) Jochen Dauer	8
(West Germany) Victor Dauer Racing	Porsche 962C	Porsche Type-935/82 3.0 L Turbo Flat-6	G	16	(Austria) Franz Konrad	8
(West Germany) Porsche AG	Porsche 962C	Porsche Type-935/82 3.0 L Turbo Flat-6	D	17	(West Germany) Klaus Ludwig	5, 10
(West Germany) Porsche AG	Porsche 962C	Porsche Type-935/82 3.0 L Turbo Flat-6	D	17	(West Germany) Hans-Joachim Stuck	5
(West Germany) Porsche AG	Porsche 962C	Porsche Type-935/82 3.0 L Turbo Flat-6	D	17	(United Kingdom) Derek Bell	5
(West Germany) Porsche AG	Porsche 962C	Porsche Type-935/82 3.0 L Turbo Flat-6	D	17	(United States) Price Cobb	10
(West Germany) Porsche AG	Porsche 962C	Porsche Type-935/82 3.0 L Turbo Flat-6	D	18	(France) Bob Wollek	5
(West Germany) Porsche AG	Porsche 962C	Porsche Type-935/82 3.0 L Turbo Flat-6	D	18	(Australia) Vern Schuppan	5
(West Germany) Porsche AG	Porsche 962C	Porsche Type-935/82 3.0 L Turbo Flat-6	D	18	(South Africa) Sarel van der Merwe	5
(West Germany) Porsche AG	Porsche 962C	Porsche Type-935/82 3.0 L Turbo Flat-6	D	19	(United States) Mario Andretti	5
(West Germany) Porsche AG	Porsche 962C	Porsche Type-935/82 3.0 L Turbo Flat-6	D	19	(United States) Michael Andretti	5
(West Germany) Porsche AG	Porsche 962C	Porsche Type-935/82 3.0 L Turbo Flat-6	D	19	(United States) John Andretti	5
(United Kingdom) Team Davey	Tiga GC88; Porsche 962C	Ford Cosworth DFL 3.3 L Turbo V8; Porsche Type-935/82 3.0 L Turbo Flat-6	D	20	(United Kingdom) Tim Lee-Davey	5–6, 8–10
(United Kingdom) Team Davey	Tiga GC88; Porsche 962C	Ford Cosworth DFL 3.3 L Turbo V8; Porsche Type-935/82 3.0 L Turbo Flat-6	D	20	(United Kingdom) Tom Dodd-Noble	5, 8–10
(United Kingdom) Team Davey	Tiga GC88; Porsche 962C	Ford Cosworth DFL 3.3 L Turbo V8; Porsche Type-935/82 3.0 L Turbo Flat-6	D	20	(United Kingdom) Chris Hodgetts	6
(United Kingdom) Team Davey	Tiga GC88; Porsche 962C	Ford Cosworth DFL 3.3 L Turbo V8; Porsche Type-935/82 3.0 L Turbo Flat-6	D	20	(West Germany) Peter Oberndorfer	8–9
(United Kingdom) Team Davey	Tiga GC88; Porsche 962C	Ford Cosworth DFL 3.3 L Turbo V8; Porsche Type-935/82 3.0 L Turbo Flat-6	D	20	(Japan) Katsunori Iketani	10
(Japan) Nissan Motorsports	Nissan R88C	Nissan VRH30 3.2 L Turbo V8	B	23	(Japan) Kazuyoshi Hoshino	5, 10
(Japan) Nissan Motorsports	Nissan R88C	Nissan VRH30 3.2 L Turbo V8	B	23	(Japan) Takao Wada	5
(Japan) Nissan Motorsports	Nissan R88C	Nissan VRH30 3.2 L Turbo V8	B	23	(Japan) Aguri Suzuki	5
(Japan) Nissan Motorsports	Nissan R88C	Nissan VRH30 3.2 L Turbo V8	B	23	(Japan) Kenji Takahashi	10
(Japan) Nissan Motorsports	Nissan R88C	Nissan VRH30 3.2 L Turbo V8	B	23	(Australia) Allan Grice	10
(Japan) Nissan Motorsports	Nissan R88C	Nissan VRH30 3.2 L Turbo V8	B	32	(United Kingdom) Win Percy	5
(Japan) Nissan Motorsports	Nissan R88C	Nissan VRH30 3.2 L Turbo V8	B	32	(United Kingdom) Mike Wilds	5
(Japan) Nissan Motorsports	Nissan R88C	Nissan VRH30 3.2 L Turbo V8	B	32	(Australia) Allan Grice	5
(Japan) Nissan Motorsports	Nissan R88C	Nissan VRH30 3.2 L Turbo V8	B	32	(Japan) Masahiro Hasemi	10
(Japan) Nissan Motorsports	Nissan R88C	Nissan VRH30 3.2 L Turbo V8	B	32	(Japan) Aguri Suzuki	10
(Italy) Dollop Racing	Lancia LC2/85	Ferrari 308C 3.0 L Turbo V8	D	24	(Italy) Andrea de Cesaris	3
(Italy) Dollop Racing	Lancia LC2/85	Ferrari 308C 3.0 L Turbo V8	D	24	(West Germany) Christian Danner	3
(Italy) Dollop Racing	Lancia LC2/85	Ferrari 308C 3.0 L Turbo V8	D	24	(Switzerland) Jean-Pierre Frey	4–6, 8
(Italy) Dollop Racing	Lancia LC2/85	Ferrari 308C 3.0 L Turbo V8	D	24	(Italy) Nicola Marozzo	4–5
(Italy) Dollop Racing	Lancia LC2/85	Ferrari 308C 3.0 L Turbo V8	D	24	(Italy) Ranieri Randaccio	5
(Italy) Dollop Racing	Lancia LC2/85	Ferrari 308C 3.0 L Turbo V8	D	24	(Italy) Paolo Giangrossi	6, 8
(Japan) Advan Alpha Nova	Porsche 962C	Porsche Type-935/82 3.0 L Turbo Flat-6	Y	25	(Japan) Kunimitsu Takahashi	10
(Japan) Advan Alpha Nova	Porsche 962C	Porsche Type-935/82 3.0 L Turbo Flat-6	Y	25	(Japan) Kazuo Mogi	10
(Japan) From A Racing	Porsche 962C	Porsche Type-935/82 3.0 L Turbo Flat-6	B	27	(Japan) Hideki Okada	10
(Japan) From A Racing	Porsche 962C	Porsche Type-935/82 3.0 L Turbo Flat-6	B	27	(Sweden) Stanley Dickens	10
(Australia) Veskanda Racing	Veskanda C1	Chevrolet 6.0 L V8	D	26	(Australia) John Bowe	11
(Australia) Veskanda Racing	Veskanda C1	Chevrolet 6.0 L V8	D	26	(Australia) Dick Johnson	11
(Australia) Takefuji Schuppan Racing Team	Porsche 962C	Porsche Type-935/82 3.0 L Turbo Flat-6	D	33	(United Kingdom) Brian Redman	5, 10
(Australia) Takefuji Schuppan Racing Team	Porsche 962C	Porsche Type-935/82 3.0 L Turbo Flat-6	D	33	(Sweden) Eje Elgh	5
(Australia) Takefuji Schuppan Racing Team	Porsche 962C	Porsche Type-935/82 3.0 L Turbo Flat-6	D	33	(France) Jean-Pierre Jarier	5
(Australia) Takefuji Schuppan Racing Team	Porsche 962C	Porsche Type-935/82 3.0 L Turbo Flat-6	D	33	(United Kingdom) Derek Bell	10
(Australia) Rothmans Porsche Team Schuppan	Porsche 962C	Porsche Type-935/82 3.0 L Turbo Flat-6	D	99	(Sweden) Eje Elgh	10
(Australia) Rothmans Porsche Team Schuppan	Porsche 962C	Porsche Type-935/82 3.0 L Turbo Flat-6	D	99	(Brazil) Maurizio Sandro Sala	10
(Japan) Trust Racing Team	Porsche 962C GTi	Porsche Type-935/82 3.0 L Turbo Flat-6	D	100	(Australia) Vern Schuppan	10
(Japan) Trust Racing Team	Porsche 962C GTi	Porsche Type-935/82 3.0 L Turbo Flat-6	D	100	(South Africa) George Fouché	10
(Japan) Trust Racing Team	Porsche 962C GTi	Porsche Type-935/82 3.0 L Turbo Flat-6	D	100	(South Africa) Sarel van der Merwe	10
(Japan) Toyota Team Tom's	Toyota 88C; Toyota 88C-V	Toyota 3S-GTM 2.1 L Turbo I4; Toyota R32V 3.2 L Turbo V8	B	36	(United Kingdom) Geoff Lees	5, 10
(Japan) Toyota Team Tom's	Toyota 88C; Toyota 88C-V	Toyota 3S-GTM 2.1 L Turbo I4; Toyota R32V 3.2 L Turbo V8	B	36	(Japan) Masanori Sekiya	5, 10
(Japan) Toyota Team Tom's	Toyota 88C; Toyota 88C-V	Toyota 3S-GTM 2.1 L Turbo I4; Toyota R32V 3.2 L Turbo V8	B	36	(Japan) Kaoru Hoshino	5
(Japan) Toyota Team Tom's	Toyota 88C; Toyota 88C-V	Toyota 3S-GTM 2.1 L Turbo I4; Toyota R32V 3.2 L Turbo V8	B	36	(Japan) Keiichi Suzuki	10
(Japan) Toyota Team Tom's	Toyota 88C; Toyota 88C-V	Toyota 3S-GTM 2.1 L Turbo I4; Toyota R32V 3.2 L Turbo V8	B	37	(Italy) Paolo Barilla	5, 10
(Japan) Toyota Team Tom's	Toyota 88C; Toyota 88C-V	Toyota 3S-GTM 2.1 L Turbo I4; Toyota R32V 3.2 L Turbo V8	B	37	(Japan) Hitoshi Ogawa	5, 10
(Japan) Toyota Team Tom's	Toyota 88C; Toyota 88C-V	Toyota 3S-GTM 2.1 L Turbo I4; Toyota R32V 3.2 L Turbo V8	B	37	(United Kingdom) Tiff Needell	5
(Japan) Toyota Team Tom's	Toyota 88C; Toyota 88C-V	Toyota 3S-GTM 2.1 L Turbo I4; Toyota R32V 3.2 L Turbo V8	B	37	(Sweden) Stefan Johansson	10
(Switzerland) Swiss Team Salamin	Porsche 962C	Porsche Type-935/79 2.8 L Turbo Flat-6	G	40	(Switzerland) Antoine Salamin	1–4, 6–9, 11
(Switzerland) Swiss Team Salamin	Porsche 962C	Porsche Type-935/79 2.8 L Turbo Flat-6	G	40	(Switzerland) Enzo Calderari	1
(Switzerland) Swiss Team Salamin	Porsche 962C	Porsche Type-935/79 2.8 L Turbo Flat-6	G	40	(Morocco) Max Cohen-Olivar	2, 4
(Switzerland) Swiss Team Salamin	Porsche 962C	Porsche Type-935/79 2.8 L Turbo Flat-6	G	40	(United Kingdom) Dudley Wood	3
(Switzerland) Swiss Team Salamin	Porsche 962C	Porsche Type-935/79 2.8 L Turbo Flat-6	G	40	(West Germany) Hellmut Mundas	4
(Switzerland) Swiss Team Salamin	Porsche 962C	Porsche Type-935/79 2.8 L Turbo Flat-6	G	40	(Italy) Luigi Taverna	6
(Switzerland) Swiss Team Salamin	Porsche 962C	Porsche Type-935/79 2.8 L Turbo Flat-6	G	40	(Italy) Giovanni Lavaggi	7–9, 11
(Switzerland) Swiss Team Salamin	Porsche 962C	Porsche Type-935/79 2.8 L Turbo Flat-6	G	40	(Switzerland) Jean-Denis Délétraz	7
(France) Noël del Bello	Sauber C8	Mercedes-Benz M117 5.0 L Turbo V8	G	42	(Switzerland) Bernard Santal	3–5, 7
(France) Noël del Bello	Sauber C8	Mercedes-Benz M117 5.0 L Turbo V8	G	42	(France) Jacques Guillot	3–4
(France) Noël del Bello	Sauber C8	Mercedes-Benz M117 5.0 L Turbo V8	G	42	(France) Roland Biancone	3
(France) Noël del Bello	Sauber C8	Mercedes-Benz M117 5.0 L Turbo V8	G	42	(France) Noël del Bello	4–5, 7
(France) Noël del Bello	Sauber C8	Mercedes-Benz M117 5.0 L Turbo V8	G	42	(Belgium) Bernard de Dryver	5
(France) Noël del Bello	Sauber C8	Mercedes-Benz M117 5.0 L Turbo V8	G	42	(Belgium) Hervé Regout	7
(Japan) Auto Beaurex Motorsport	Toyota 87C	Toyota 4T-GT 2.1 L Turbo I4	D	45	(United Kingdom) Andrew Gilbert-Scott	10
(Japan) Auto Beaurex Motorsport	Toyota 87C	Toyota 4T-GT 2.1 L Turbo I4	D	45	(Sweden) Steven Andskär	10
(Japan) SARD	SARD MC88S	Toyota 3S-GTM 2.1 L Turbo I4	D	50	(Japan) Syuuroku Sasaki	10
(Japan) SARD	SARD MC88S	Toyota 3S-GTM 2.1 L Turbo I4	D	50	(United Kingdom) Martin Donnelly	10
(Japan) SARD	SARD MC88S	Toyota 3S-GTM 2.1 L Turbo I4	D	50	(West Germany) Jochen Dauer	10
(France) Secateva	WM P88	Peugeot ZNS4 2.9 L Turbo I4	M	51	(France) Roger Dorchy	5
(France) Secateva	WM P88	Peugeot ZNS4 2.9 L Turbo I4	M	51	(France) Jean-Daniel Raulet	5
(France) Secateva	WM P88	Peugeot ZNS4 2.9 L Turbo I4	M	51	(Switzerland) Claude Haldi	5
(France) Secateva	WM P87	Peugeot ZNS4 2.9 L Turbo I4	M	52	(France) Pescal Pessiot	5
(France) Secateva	WM P87	Peugeot ZNS4 2.9 L Turbo I4	M	52	(France) Jean-Daniel Raulet	5
(Switzerland) Team Sauber Mercedes	Sauber-Mercedes C9	Mercedes-Benz M117 5.0 L Turbo V8	M	61	(France) Jean-Louis Schlesser	1–4, 6–11
(Switzerland) Team Sauber Mercedes	Sauber-Mercedes C9	Mercedes-Benz M117 5.0 L Turbo V8	M	61	(Italy) Mauro Baldi	1–3, 5–7, 9
(Switzerland) Team Sauber Mercedes	Sauber-Mercedes C9	Mercedes-Benz M117 5.0 L Turbo V8	M	61	(West Germany) Jochen Mass	1, 3–5, 7–11
(Switzerland) Team Sauber Mercedes	Sauber-Mercedes C9	Mercedes-Benz M117 5.0 L Turbo V8	M	61	(United Kingdom) James Weaver	5–7
(Switzerland) Team Sauber Mercedes	Sauber-Mercedes C9	Mercedes-Benz M117 5.0 L Turbo V8	M	61	(United Kingdom) Kenny Acheson	10
(Switzerland) Team Sauber Mercedes	Sauber-Mercedes C9	Mercedes-Benz M117 5.0 L Turbo V8	M	62	(United Kingdom) James Weaver	4, 6
(Switzerland) Team Sauber Mercedes	Sauber-Mercedes C9	Mercedes-Benz M117 5.0 L Turbo V8	M	62	(Italy) Mauro Baldi	4, 7–11
(Switzerland) Team Sauber Mercedes	Sauber-Mercedes C9	Mercedes-Benz M117 5.0 L Turbo V8	M	62	(West Germany) Klaus Niedzwiedz	5
(Switzerland) Team Sauber Mercedes	Sauber-Mercedes C9	Mercedes-Benz M117 5.0 L Turbo V8	M	62	(United Kingdom) Kenny Acheson	5
(Switzerland) Team Sauber Mercedes	Sauber-Mercedes C9	Mercedes-Benz M117 5.0 L Turbo V8	M	62	(France) Jean-Louis Schlesser	6–7, 9
(Switzerland) Team Sauber Mercedes	Sauber-Mercedes C9	Mercedes-Benz M117 5.0 L Turbo V8	M	62	(West Germany) Jochen Mass	6–7
(Switzerland) Team Sauber Mercedes	Sauber-Mercedes C9	Mercedes-Benz M117 5.0 L Turbo V8	M	62	(Sweden) Stefan Johansson	8–9, 11
(Switzerland) Team Sauber Mercedes	Sauber-Mercedes C9	Mercedes-Benz M117 5.0 L Turbo V8	M	62	(France) Philippe Streiff	10
(France) Primagaz Compétition	Porsche 962C	Porsche Type-935/79 2.8 L Turbo Flat-6	G	72	(West Germany) Jürgen Lässig	5
(France) Primagaz Compétition	Porsche 962C	Porsche Type-935/79 2.8 L Turbo Flat-6	G	72	(France) Pierre Yver	5
(France) Primagaz Compétition	Porsche 962C	Porsche Type-935/79 2.8 L Turbo Flat-6	G	72	(United Kingdom) Dudley Wood	5
(West Germany) Memorex Telex Racing Team	Porsche 962C	Porsche Type-935/82 3.0 L Turbo Flat-6	G	77	(Italy) Gianpiero Moretti	10
(West Germany) Memorex Telex Racing Team	Porsche 962C	Porsche Type-935/82 3.0 L Turbo Flat-6	G	77	(United Kingdom) Tiff Needell	10
(West Germany) Memorex Telex Racing Team	Porsche 962C	Porsche Type-935/82 3.0 L Turbo Flat-6	G	77	(Belgium) Harald Huysman	10
(Japan) Italya Sport Team LeMans	March 88C	Nissan VG30ET 3.2 L Turbo V6	Y	85	(Japan) Toshio Suzuki	5, 10
(Japan) Italya Sport Team LeMans	March 88C	Nissan VG30ET 3.2 L Turbo V6	Y	85	(United States) Danny Ongais	5
(Japan) Italya Sport Team LeMans	March 88C	Nissan VG30ET 3.2 L Turbo V6	Y	85	(France) Michel Trollé	5
(Japan) Italya Sport Team LeMans	March 88C	Nissan VG30ET 3.2 L Turbo V6	Y	85	(Japan) Akio Morimoto	10
(Japan) Italya Sport Team LeMans	March 88C	Nissan VG30ET 3.2 L Turbo V6	Y	86	(Sweden) Anders Olofsson	5, 10
(Japan) Italya Sport Team LeMans	March 88C	Nissan VG30ET 3.2 L Turbo V6	Y	86	(Italy) Lamberto Leoni	5
(Japan) Italya Sport Team LeMans	March 88C	Nissan VG30ET 3.2 L Turbo V6	Y	86	(Japan) Akio Morimoto	5
(Japan) Italya Sport Team LeMans	March 88C	Nissan VG30ET 3.2 L Turbo V6	Y	86	(Japan) Takao Wada	10

=== Group C2 ===
Entrant	Car	Engine	Tyre	No.	Drivers	Rounds
(Italy) Dollop Racing	Argo JM19B	Motori Moderni 2.0 L Turbo V6	G	101	(Switzerland) Jean-Pierre Frey	1–4
(Italy) Dollop Racing	Argo JM19B	Motori Moderni 2.0 L Turbo V6	G	101	(Italy) Nicola Marozzo	1–4
(United Kingdom) BP Spice Engineering	Spice SE88C	Ford Cosworth DFL 3.3 L V8	A G	103	(Denmark) Thorkild Thyrring	All
(United Kingdom) BP Spice Engineering	Spice SE88C	Ford Cosworth DFL 3.3 L V8	A G	103	(Italy) Almo Coppelli	1–9
(United Kingdom) BP Spice Engineering	Spice SE88C	Ford Cosworth DFL 3.3 L V8	A G	103	(Chile) Eliseo Salazar	5, 10–11
(United Kingdom) BP Spice Engineering	Spice SE88C	Ford Cosworth DFL 3.3 L V8	A G	111	(United Kingdom) Ray Bellm	All
(United Kingdom) BP Spice Engineering	Spice SE88C	Ford Cosworth DFL 3.3 L V8	A G	111	(United Kingdom) Gordon Spice	All
(United Kingdom) BP Spice Engineering	Spice SE88C	Ford Cosworth DFL 3.3 L V8	A G	111	(France) Pierre de Thoisy	5
(Italy) Kelmar Racing	Tiga GC288	Ford Cosworth DFL 3.3 L V8	A G	106	(Italy) Vito Veninata	1–2, 6, 8–10
(Italy) Kelmar Racing	Tiga GC288	Ford Cosworth DFL 3.3 L V8	A G	106	(Italy) Pasquale Barberio	1–2, 6, 8–9
(Italy) Kelmar Racing	Tiga GC288	Ford Cosworth DFL 3.3 L V8	A G	106	(Italy) Stefano Sebastiani	9
(Italy) Kelmar Racing	Tiga GC288	Ford Cosworth DFL 3.3 L V8	A G	106	(Italy) Ranieri Randaccio	10
(Italy) Kelmar Racing	Tiga GC85; Tiga GC288	Ford Cosworth DFL 3.3 L V8	A G	109	(Italy) Ranieri Randaccio	1–4, 6–9, 11
(Italy) Kelmar Racing	Tiga GC85; Tiga GC288	Ford Cosworth DFL 3.3 L V8	A G	109	(Italy) Maurizio Gellini	1–2, 6–9
(Italy) Kelmar Racing	Tiga GC85; Tiga GC288	Ford Cosworth DFL 3.3 L V8	A G	109	(Italy) Paolo Ciafardoni	1
(Italy) Kelmar Racing	Tiga GC85; Tiga GC288	Ford Cosworth DFL 3.3 L V8	A G	109	(Italy) Vito Veninata	3–4, 7
(Italy) Kelmar Racing	Tiga GC85; Tiga GC288	Ford Cosworth DFL 3.3 L V8	A G	109	(Italy) Pasquale Barberio	3–4
(Italy) Kelmar Racing	Tiga GC85; Tiga GC288	Ford Cosworth DFL 3.3 L V8	A G	109	(Italy) Luigi Taverna	9
(Italy) Kelmar Racing	Tiga GC85; Tiga GC288	Ford Cosworth DFL 3.3 L V8	A G	109	(Italy) Stefano Sebastiani	11
(United Kingdom) Chamberlain Engineering	Spice SE88C	Ford Cosworth DFL 3.3 L V8	A G	107	(France) Jean-Louis Ricci	All
(United Kingdom) Chamberlain Engineering	Spice SE88C	Ford Cosworth DFL 3.3 L V8	A G	107	(France) Claude Ballot-Léna	All
(United Kingdom) Chamberlain Engineering	Spice SE88C	Ford Cosworth DFL 3.3 L V8	A G	107	(France) Jean-Claude Andruet	5
(United Kingdom) Chamberlain Engineering	Spice SE88C	Ford Cosworth DFL 3.3 L V8	A G	107	(United Kingdom) Ian Khan	10
(United Kingdom) Chamberlain Engineering	Spice SE86C	Hart 418T 1.8 L Turbo I4	A G	127	(United Kingdom) Nick Adams	1–9, 11
(United Kingdom) Chamberlain Engineering	Spice SE86C	Hart 418T 1.8 L Turbo I4	A G	127	(South Africa) Graham Duxbury	1–3
(United Kingdom) Chamberlain Engineering	Spice SE86C	Hart 418T 1.8 L Turbo I4	A G	127	(United Kingdom) Ian Khan	4, 10
(United Kingdom) Chamberlain Engineering	Spice SE86C	Hart 418T 1.8 L Turbo I4	A G	127	(Republic of Ireland) Martin Birrane	5, 7
(United Kingdom) Chamberlain Engineering	Spice SE86C	Hart 418T 1.8 L Turbo I4	A G	127	(United Kingdom) Richard Jones	5, 8–9
(United Kingdom) Chamberlain Engineering	Spice SE86C	Hart 418T 1.8 L Turbo I4	A G	127	(United Kingdom) Paul Stott	6
(United Kingdom) Chamberlain Engineering	Spice SE86C	Hart 418T 1.8 L Turbo I4	A G	127	(United Kingdom) John Williams	8–9
(United Kingdom) Chamberlain Engineering	Spice SE86C	Hart 418T 1.8 L Turbo I4	A G	127	(Australia) Arthur Abrahams	10
(United Kingdom) Chamberlain Engineering	Spice SE86C	Hart 418T 1.8 L Turbo I4	A G	127	(United States) Dan Murphy	10
(United Kingdom) Chamberlain Engineering	Spice SE86C	Hart 418T 1.8 L Turbo I4	A G	127	(Australia) Andrew Miedecke	11
(United Kingdom) FAI Automotive	Tiga GC287	Ford Cosworth DFL 3.3 L V8	A G	112	(United Kingdom) Sean Walker	4, 7
(United Kingdom) FAI Automotive	Tiga GC287	Ford Cosworth DFL 3.3 L V8	A G	112	(United Kingdom) Paul Stott	4, 7
(United Kingdom) FAI Automotive	Tiga GC287	Ford Cosworth DFL 3.3 L V8	A G	112	(United Kingdom) Evan Clements	4
(United Kingdom) FAI Automotive	Tiga GC287	Ford Cosworth DFL 3.3 L V8	A G	112	(United Kingdom) Ian Flux	7
(France) Primagaz Compétition	Cougar C12	Ford Cosworth DFL 3.3 L V8		113	(France) Thierry Lecerf	5
(France) Primagaz Compétition	Cougar C12	Ford Cosworth DFL 3.3 L V8		113	(Morocco) Max Cohen-Olivar	5
(France) Primagaz Compétition	Cougar C12	Ford Cosworth DFL 3.3 L V8		113	(Belgium) Patrick de Radigues	5
(United Kingdom) ADA Engineering	ADA 03	Ford Cosworth DFL 3.3 L V8	G	115	(United Kingdom) Dudley Wood	1–2
(United Kingdom) ADA Engineering	ADA 03	Ford Cosworth DFL 3.3 L V8	G	115	(United Kingdom) Steve Kempton	1
(United Kingdom) ADA Engineering	ADA 03	Ford Cosworth DFL 3.3 L V8	G	115	(United Kingdom) Johnny Herbert	1
(United Kingdom) ADA Engineering	ADA 03	Ford Cosworth DFL 3.3 L V8	G	115	(United Kingdom) Ian Harrower	2, 5
(United Kingdom) ADA Engineering	ADA 03	Ford Cosworth DFL 3.3 L V8	G	115	(United Kingdom) John Sheldon	2, 7
(United Kingdom) ADA Engineering	ADA 03	Ford Cosworth DFL 3.3 L V8	G	115	(United Kingdom) Tom Dodd-Noble	4
(United Kingdom) ADA Engineering	ADA 03	Ford Cosworth DFL 3.3 L V8	G	115	(United Kingdom) Colin Pool	4
(United Kingdom) ADA Engineering	ADA 03	Ford Cosworth DFL 3.3 L V8	G	115	(Italy) Stefano Sebastiani	4
(United Kingdom) ADA Engineering	ADA 03	Ford Cosworth DFL 3.3 L V8	G	115	(Japan) Jirou Yoneyama	5
(United Kingdom) ADA Engineering	ADA 03	Ford Cosworth DFL 3.3 L V8	G	115	(Japan) Hideo Fukuyama	5
(United Kingdom) ADA Engineering	ADA 03	Ford Cosworth DFL 3.3 L V8	G	115	(United Kingdom) Tim Lee-Davey	7
(United Kingdom) ADA Engineering	ADA 03	Ford Cosworth DFL 3.3 L V8	G	115	(Austria) "Pierre Chauvet"	7
(United Kingdom) ADA Engineering	ADA 03	Ford Cosworth DFL 3.3 L V8	G	115	(Australia) Arthur Abrahams	11
(United Kingdom) ADA Engineering	ADA 03	Ford Cosworth DFL 3.3 L V8	G	115	(Australia) John Smith	11
(Norway) Team Lucky Strike Schanche	Argo JM19C	Ford Cosworth DFL 3.3 L V8	G	117	(Norway) Martin Schanche	1–5, 7
(Norway) Team Lucky Strike Schanche	Argo JM19C	Ford Cosworth DFL 3.3 L V8	G	117	(United Kingdom) Will Hoy	1–4, 7
(Norway) Team Lucky Strike Schanche	Argo JM19C	Ford Cosworth DFL 3.3 L V8	G	117	(United Kingdom) Mark Rennison	4
(Norway) Team Lucky Strike Schanche	Argo JM19C	Ford Cosworth DFL 3.3 L V8	G	117	(United Kingdom) Robin Smith	5, 8–9
(Norway) Team Lucky Strike Schanche	Argo JM19C	Ford Cosworth DFL 3.3 L V8	G	117	(United Kingdom) Robin Donovan	5
(Norway) Team Lucky Strike Schanche	Argo JM19C	Ford Cosworth DFL 3.3 L V8	G	117	(Austria) "Pierre Chauvet"	8–9
(Norway) Team Lucky Strike Schanche	Argo JM19C	Ford Cosworth DFL 3.3 L V8	G	117	(United Kingdom) John Sheldon	9
(United Kingdom) GP Motorsport	Spice SE87C	Ford Cosworth DFL 3.3 L V8	G	121	(Greece) Costas Los	All
(United Kingdom) GP Motorsport	Spice SE87C	Ford Cosworth DFL 3.3 L V8	G	121	(France) Philippe de Henning	1–3, 11
(United Kingdom) GP Motorsport	Spice SE87C	Ford Cosworth DFL 3.3 L V8	G	121	(South Africa) Wayne Taylor	4–5, 7–9
(United Kingdom) GP Motorsport	Spice SE87C	Ford Cosworth DFL 3.3 L V8	G	121	(United Kingdom) Evan Clements	5–6
(United Kingdom) GP Motorsport	Spice SE87C	Ford Cosworth DFL 3.3 L V8	G	121	(United States) Tom Hessert	10
(United Kingdom) Charles Ivey Racing Team Istel	Tiga GC287	Porsche Type-935/76 2.6 L Turbo Flat-6	A D	123	(United Kingdom) Tim Harvey	1–5, 7
(United Kingdom) Charles Ivey Racing Team Istel	Tiga GC287	Porsche Type-935/76 2.6 L Turbo Flat-6	A D	123	(South Africa) Wayne Taylor	1–3
(United Kingdom) Charles Ivey Racing Team Istel	Tiga GC287	Porsche Type-935/76 2.6 L Turbo Flat-6	A D	123	(United Kingdom) Chris Hodgetts	4–5, 7
(United Kingdom) Charles Ivey Racing Team Istel	Tiga GC287	Porsche Type-935/76 2.6 L Turbo Flat-6	A D	123	(United Kingdom) Duncan Bain	4
(United Kingdom) Charles Ivey Racing Team Istel	Tiga GC287	Porsche Type-935/76 2.6 L Turbo Flat-6	A D	123	(United Kingdom) John Sheldon	5
(United Kingdom) Charles Ivey Racing Team Istel	Tiga GC287	Porsche Type-935/76 2.6 L Turbo Flat-6	A D	123	(United Kingdom) Robin Donovan	7
(France) MT Sport Racing	Argo JM19C	Ford Cosworth DFL 3.3 L V8	A	124	(France) Pierre-François Rousselot	5, 8–9, 11
(France) MT Sport Racing	Argo JM19C	Ford Cosworth DFL 3.3 L V8	A	124	(France) Jean Messaoudi	5, 8–9, 11
(France) MT Sport Racing	Argo JM19C	Ford Cosworth DFL 3.3 L V8	A	124	(France) Jean-Luc Roy	5
(France) Patrick Oudet Vetir Racing	Tiga GC85	Ford Cosworth DFL 3.3 L V8	A	125	(France) Jean-Claude Ferrarin	7, 9
(France) Patrick Oudet Vetir Racing	Tiga GC85	Ford Cosworth DFL 3.3 L V8	A	125	(France) Dominique Lacaud	7, 9
(France) Patrick Oudet Vetir Racing	Tiga GC85	Ford Cosworth DFL 3.3 L V8	A	125	(Belgium) Pascal Witmeur	9
(France) Graff Racing	Spice SE86C	Ford Cosworth DFL 3.3 L V8	A	131	(France) Jean-Philippe Grand	5
(France) Graff Racing	Spice SE86C	Ford Cosworth DFL 3.3 L V8	A	131	(France) Jacques Terrien	5
(France) Graff Racing	Spice SE86C	Ford Cosworth DFL 3.3 L V8	A	131	(France) Maurice Guenoun	5
(France) Roland Bassaler	Sauber SHS C6	BMW M88 3.5 L I6	A	132	(France) Jean-François Yvon	5
(France) Roland Bassaler	Sauber SHS C6	BMW M88 3.5 L I6	A	132	(France) Roland Bassaler	5
(France) Roland Bassaler	Sauber SHS C6	BMW M88 3.5 L I6	A	132	(France) Remy Pochauvin	5
(Switzerland) Pierre-Alain Lombardi	Rondeau M379C; Spice SE86C	Ford Cosworth DFV 3.0 L V8; Ford Cosworth DFL 3.3 L V8	A	151	(Switzerland) Pierre-Alain Lombardi	3, 5, 8–9
(Switzerland) Pierre-Alain Lombardi	Rondeau M379C; Spice SE86C	Ford Cosworth DFV 3.0 L V8; Ford Cosworth DFL 3.3 L V8	A	151	(Switzerland) Rolando Vaglio	3, 5
(Switzerland) Pierre-Alain Lombardi	Rondeau M379C; Spice SE86C	Ford Cosworth DFV 3.0 L V8; Ford Cosworth DFL 3.3 L V8	A	151	(Switzerland) Silvio Vaglio	3
(Switzerland) Pierre-Alain Lombardi	Rondeau M379C; Spice SE86C	Ford Cosworth DFV 3.0 L V8; Ford Cosworth DFL 3.3 L V8	A	151	(France) Bruno Sotty	5, 8–9
(Switzerland) Pierre-Alain Lombardi	Rondeau M379C; Spice SE86C	Ford Cosworth DFV 3.0 L V8; Ford Cosworth DFL 3.3 L V8	A	151	(France) Thierry Lecerf	8–9
(West Germany) Gebhardt Motorsport	Gebhardt JC873	Audi 2.1 L Turbo I5; Ford Cosworth DFL 3.3 L V8	A	160	(West Germany) Rudi Seher	3, 8
(West Germany) Gebhardt Motorsport	Gebhardt JC873	Audi 2.1 L Turbo I5; Ford Cosworth DFL 3.3 L V8	A	160	(West Germany) Hellmut Mundas	3, 8
(West Germany) Gebhardt Motorsport	Gebhardt JC873	Audi 2.1 L Turbo I5; Ford Cosworth DFL 3.3 L V8	A	160	(West Germany) Günther Gebhardt	3
(West Germany) Gebhardt Motorsport	Gebhardt JC873	Audi 2.1 L Turbo I5; Ford Cosworth DFL 3.3 L V8	A	160	(West Germany) Stefan Neuberger	8
(Japan) British Barn Racing Team	JTK 62C	Ford Cosworth DFL 3.3 L V8	D	171	(Japan) Jirou Yoneyama	10
(Japan) British Barn Racing Team	JTK 62C	Ford Cosworth DFL 3.3 L V8	D	171	(Japan) Hideo Fukuyama	10
(Japan) British Barn Racing Team	JTK 62C	Ford Cosworth DFL 3.3 L V8	D	171	(Japan) Kiyoshi Misaki	10
(France) Automobiles Louis Descartes	ALD 03; ALD 04	BMW M88 3.5 L I6	A	177	(France) Louis Descartes	1–2, 5–6, 8–9
(France) Automobiles Louis Descartes	ALD 03; ALD 04	BMW M88 3.5 L I6	A	177	(France) Gérard Tremblay	1, 3–4, 6–8
(France) Automobiles Louis Descartes	ALD 03; ALD 04	BMW M88 3.5 L I6	A	177	(France) Sylvain Boulay	1
(France) Automobiles Louis Descartes	ALD 03; ALD 04	BMW M88 3.5 L I6	A	177	(France) Jacques Hueclin	2–3, 5, 9
(France) Automobiles Louis Descartes	ALD 03; ALD 04	BMW M88 3.5 L I6	A	177	(France) Dominique Lacaud	3–5, 8–9
(France) Automobiles Louis Descartes	ALD 03; ALD 04	BMW M88 3.5 L I6	A	177	(France) Michel Lateste	4, 7
(France) Automobiles Louis Descartes	ALD 03; ALD 04	BMW M88 3.5 L I6	A	177	(United Kingdom) Del Bennett	7
(France) Automobiles Louis Descartes	ALD 03; ALD 04	BMW M88 3.5 L I6	A	172; 178	(France) Pierre Yver	1, 3
(France) Automobiles Louis Descartes	ALD 03; ALD 04	BMW M88 3.5 L I6	A	172; 178	(France) Bruno Sotty	1
(France) Automobiles Louis Descartes	ALD 03; ALD 04	BMW M88 3.5 L I6	A	172; 178	(Morocco) Max Cohen-Olivar	3
(France) Automobiles Louis Descartes	ALD 03; ALD 04	BMW M88 3.5 L I6	A	172; 178	(France) Gérard Tremblay	4–5, 9
(France) Automobiles Louis Descartes	ALD 03; ALD 04	BMW M88 3.5 L I6	A	172; 178	(France) Michel Lateste	4–5, 11
(France) Automobiles Louis Descartes	ALD 03; ALD 04	BMW M88 3.5 L I6	A	172; 178	(France) Louis Descartes	4, 11
(France) Automobiles Louis Descartes	ALD 03; ALD 04	BMW M88 3.5 L I6	A	172; 178	(France) Sylvain Boulay	5
(France) Automobiles Louis Descartes	ALD 03; ALD 04	BMW M88 3.5 L I6	A	172; 178	(United Kingdom) David Mercer	9
(Italy) Luigi Taverna Technoracing	Olmas GLT-200	Ford Cosworth DFL 3.3 L V8	A	181	(Italy) Luigi Taverna	3–5
(Italy) Luigi Taverna Technoracing	Olmas GLT-200	Ford Cosworth DFL 3.3 L V8	A	181	(Italy) Robert Regazzi	3–5
(Italy) Luigi Taverna Technoracing	Olmas GLT-200	Ford Cosworth DFL 3.3 L V8	A	181	(Italy) Giovanni Lavaggi	3
(Italy) Luigi Taverna Technoracing	Olmas GLT-200	Ford Cosworth DFL 3.3 L V8	A	181	(Italy) Fabio Magnani	5
(West Germany) Pero Racing	Argo JM19	Porsche 3.2 L Turbo Flat-6		182	(West Germany) Peter Fritsch	8
(West Germany) Pero Racing	Argo JM19	Porsche 3.2 L Turbo Flat-6		182	(West Germany) Dieter Heinzelmann	8
(West Germany) Walter Maurer	Maurer C87	BMW 2.0 L Turbo I4	D	183	(West Germany) Walter Maurer	8, 11
(West Germany) Walter Maurer	Maurer C87	BMW 2.0 L Turbo I4	D	183	(West Germany) Helmut Gall	8, 11
(West Germany) Walter Maurer	Maurer C87	BMW 2.0 L Turbo I4	D	183	(West Germany) Edgar Dören	8
(United Kingdom) Ark Racing	Ceekar 83J-1	Ford Cosworth DFV 3.0 L V8		188	(United Kingdom) Max Payne	1
(United Kingdom) Ark Racing	Ceekar 83J-1	Ford Cosworth DFV 3.0 L V8		188	(Morocco) Max Cohen-Olivar	1
(United Kingdom) PC Automotive	Argo JM19C	Ford Cosworth DFL 3.3 L V8	G	191	(United States) Olindo Iacobelli	3–5, 7–9
(United Kingdom) PC Automotive	Argo JM19C	Ford Cosworth DFL 3.3 L V8	G	191	(United Kingdom) Richard Piper	3–4, 7–9
(United Kingdom) PC Automotive	Argo JM19C	Ford Cosworth DFL 3.3 L V8	G	191	(Republic of Ireland) Martin Birrane	3–4
(United Kingdom) PC Automotive	Argo JM19C	Ford Cosworth DFL 3.3 L V8	G	191	(France) Alain Ianetta	5
(United Kingdom) PC Automotive	Argo JM19C	Ford Cosworth DFL 3.3 L V8	G	191	(Canada) John Graham	5
(United Kingdom) Roy Baker Racing	Tiga GC286	Ford Cosworth DFL 3.3 L V8	G D	198	(United Kingdom) David Andrews	4–5
(United Kingdom) Roy Baker Racing	Tiga GC286	Ford Cosworth DFL 3.3 L V8	G D	198	(United Kingdom) Mike Kimpton	4, 6
(United Kingdom) Roy Baker Racing	Tiga GC286	Ford Cosworth DFL 3.3 L V8	G D	198	(United Kingdom) Chris Ashmore	4
(United Kingdom) Roy Baker Racing	Tiga GC286	Ford Cosworth DFL 3.3 L V8	G D	198	(United States) Stephen Hynes	5, 7, 9
(United Kingdom) Roy Baker Racing	Tiga GC286	Ford Cosworth DFL 3.3 L V8	G D	198	(United States) Mike Allison	5
(United Kingdom) Roy Baker Racing	Tiga GC286	Ford Cosworth DFL 3.3 L V8	G D	198	(United States) Lon Bender	6
(United Kingdom) Roy Baker Racing	Tiga GC286	Ford Cosworth DFL 3.3 L V8	G D	198	(Morocco) Max Cohen-Olivar	7, 9
(United Kingdom) Roy Baker Racing	Tiga GC286	Ford Cosworth DFL 3.3 L V8	G D	198	(United Kingdom) John Bartlett	7, 11
(United Kingdom) Roy Baker Racing	Tiga GC286	Ford Cosworth DFL 3.3 L V8	G D	198	(United Kingdom) John Sheldon	8
(United Kingdom) Roy Baker Racing	Tiga GC286	Ford Cosworth DFL 3.3 L V8	G D	198	(Australia) Neil Crang	8
(United Kingdom) Roy Baker Racing	Tiga GC286	Ford Cosworth DFL 3.3 L V8	G D	198	(United Kingdom) Val Musetti	9
(United Kingdom) Roy Baker Racing	Tiga GC286	Ford Cosworth DFL 3.3 L V8	G D	198	(Australia) Michael Hall	11

=== IMSA GTP ===
Entrant	Car	Engine	Tyre	No.	Drivers	Rounds
(Japan) Mazdaspeed Co. Ltd.	Mazda 767	Mazda 13J 2.6 L 4-rotor	D	201	(Japan) Yoshimi Katayama	4–5, 10
(Japan) Mazdaspeed Co. Ltd.	Mazda 767	Mazda 13J 2.6 L 4-rotor	D	201	(Republic of Ireland) David Kennedy	4
(Japan) Mazdaspeed Co. Ltd.	Mazda 767	Mazda 13J 2.6 L 4-rotor	D	201	(Japan) Yojiro Terada	4
(Japan) Mazdaspeed Co. Ltd.	Mazda 767	Mazda 13J 2.6 L 4-rotor	D	201	(United Kingdom) David Leslie	5
(Japan) Mazdaspeed Co. Ltd.	Mazda 767	Mazda 13J 2.6 L 4-rotor	D	201	(Belgium) Marc Duez	5
(Japan) Mazdaspeed Co. Ltd.	Mazda 767	Mazda 13J 2.6 L 4-rotor	D	201	(Belgium) Pierre Dieudonné	10
(Japan) Mazdaspeed Co. Ltd.	Mazda 767	Mazda 13J 2.6 L 4-rotor	D	201	(Japan) Takashi Yorino	10
(Japan) Mazdaspeed Co. Ltd.	Mazda 767	Mazda 13J 2.6 L 4-rotor	D	202	(Japan) Takashi Yorino	5
(Japan) Mazdaspeed Co. Ltd.	Mazda 767	Mazda 13J 2.6 L 4-rotor	D	202	(Belgium) Hervé Regout	5
(Japan) Mazdaspeed Co. Ltd.	Mazda 767	Mazda 13J 2.6 L 4-rotor	D	202	(United Kingdom) Will Hoy	5
(Japan) Mazdaspeed Co. Ltd.	Mazda 767	Mazda 13J 2.6 L 4-rotor	D	202	(Japan) Yojiro Terada	10
(Japan) Mazdaspeed Co. Ltd.	Mazda 767	Mazda 13J 2.6 L 4-rotor	D	202	(Republic of Ireland) David Kennedy	10
(Japan) Mazdaspeed Co. Ltd.	Mazda 757	Mazda 13G 2.0 L 3-rotor	D	203	(Japan) Yojiro Terada	5
(Japan) Mazdaspeed Co. Ltd.	Mazda 757	Mazda 13G 2.0 L 3-rotor	D	203	(Belgium) Pierre Dieudonné	5
(Japan) Mazdaspeed Co. Ltd.	Mazda 757	Mazda 13G 2.0 L 3-rotor	D	203	(Republic of Ireland) David Kennedy	5
(Japan) Shizumatsu Racing	Mazda 757	Mazda 13G 2.0 L 3-rotor	D	230	(Japan) Tetsuji Shiratori	10
(Japan) Shizumatsu Racing	Mazda 757	Mazda 13G 2.0 L 3-rotor	D	230	(Japan) Syuuji Fujii	10
(Japan) Shizumatsu Racing	Mazda 757	Mazda 13G 2.0 L 3-rotor	D	230	(Japan) Terumitsu Fujieda	10

== Results and standings ==
=== Race results ===
Rnd	Circuit	Outright Winning Team	C2 Winning Team	Reports
Rnd	Circuit	Outright Winning Drivers	C2 Winning Drivers	Reports
1	Jerez	(Switzerland) No. 61 Team Sauber Mercedes	(United Kingdom) No. 111 BP Spice Engineering	Report
1	Jerez	(France) Jean-Louis Schlesser (Italy) Mauro Baldi (West Germany) Jochen Mass	(United Kingdom) Gordon Spice (United Kingdom) Ray Bellm	Report
2	Jarama	(United Kingdom) No. 1 Silk Cut Jaguar	(United Kingdom) No. 111 BP Spice Engineering	Report
2	Jarama	(United States) Eddie Cheever (United Kingdom) Martin Brundle	(United Kingdom) Gordon Spice (United Kingdom) Ray Bellm	Report
3	Monza	(United Kingdom) No. 1 Silk Cut Jaguar	(United Kingdom) No. 111 BP Spice Engineering	Report
3	Monza	(United States) Eddie Cheever (United Kingdom) Martin Brundle	(United Kingdom) Gordon Spice (United Kingdom) Ray Bellm	Report
4	Silverstone	(United Kingdom) No. 1 Silk Cut Jaguar	(United Kingdom) No. 103 BP Spice Engineering	Report
4	Silverstone	(United States) Eddie Cheever (United Kingdom) Martin Brundle	(Italy) Almo Coppelli (Denmark) Thorkild Thyrring	Report
5	Le Mans	(United Kingdom) No. 2 Silk Cut Jaguar	(United Kingdom) No. 111 BP Spice Engineering	Report
5	Le Mans	(United Kingdom) Andy Wallace (United Kingdom) Johnny Dumfries (Netherlands) Jan Lammers	(United Kingdom) Gordon Spice (United Kingdom) Ray Bellm (France) Pierre de Thoisy	Report
6	Brno	(Switzerland) No. 62 Team Sauber Mercedes	(United Kingdom) No. 111 BP Spice Engineering	Report
6	Brno	(France) Jean-Louis Schlesser (West Germany) Jochen Mass	(United Kingdom) Gordon Spice (United Kingdom) Ray Bellm	Report
7	Brands Hatch	(United Kingdom) No. 1 Silk Cut Jaguar	(United Kingdom) No. 111 BP Spice Engineering	Report
7	Brands Hatch	(United Kingdom) Andy Wallace (United Kingdom) Martin Brundle (Denmark) John Nielsen	(United Kingdom) Gordon Spice (United Kingdom) Ray Bellm	Report
8	Nürburgring	(Switzerland) No. 61 Team Sauber Mercedes	(Italy) No. 106 Kelmar Racing Team	Report
8	Nürburgring	(France) Jean-Louis Schlesser (West Germany) Jochen Mass	(Italy) Vito Veninata (Italy) Pasquale Barberio	Report
9	Spa-Francorchamps	(Switzerland) No. 62 Team Sauber Mercedes	(United Kingdom) No. 103 BP Spice Engineering	Report
9	Spa-Francorchamps	(Italy) Mauro Baldi (Sweden) Stefan Johansson	(Italy) Almo Coppelli (Denmark) Thorkild Thyrring	Report
10	Fuji	(United Kingdom) No. 1 Silk Cut Jaguar	(United Kingdom) No. 103 BP Spice Engineering	Report
10	Fuji	(United States) Eddie Cheever (United Kingdom) Martin Brundle	(Chile) Eliseo Salazar (Denmark) Thorkild Thyrring	Report
11	Sandown Park	(Switzerland) No. 61 Team Sauber Mercedes	(United Kingdom) No. 111 BP Spice Engineering	Report
11	Sandown Park	(France) Jean-Louis Schlesser (West Germany) Jochen Mass	(United Kingdom) Gordon Spice (United Kingdom) Ray Bellm	Report

Points system
Distance	1st	2nd	3rd	4th	5th	6th	7th	8th	9th	10th	Group C2 Bonus
360 km	20	15	12	10	8	6	4	3	2	1	2
800–1000 km	40	30	24	20	16	12	8	6	4	2	4
24 hours	60	45	36	30	24	18	12	9	6	3	6

In order to be classified for points, a team had to complete 90% of the winner's distance. Further, drivers were required to complete at least 30% of their car's total race distance to qualify for championship points. Drivers forfeited points if they drove in more than one car during the race. Group C2 drivers earned extra championship points for any finish within the overall top ten positions.

=== Drivers championships ===
The respective driver championships only counted each driver's seven highest scores toward the final championship total. Points not counted toward the driver's tally are marked with parenthesis.

==== World Sports Prototype Championship for Drivers ====
Pos	Driver	Team	(Spain) JRZ	(Spain) JAR	(Italy) MON	(United Kingdom) SIL	(France) LMS	(Czech Republic) BRN	(United Kingdom) BRH	(West Germany) NUR	(Belgium) SPA	(Japan) FUJ	(Australia) SAN	Points
1	(United Kingdom) Martin Brundle	(United Kingdom) Silk Cut Jaguar	Ret	1	1	1	Ret	(2)	1	2	2	1	(3)	240
2	(France) Jean-Louis Schlesser	(Switzerland) Team Sauber Mercedes	1	(2)	2	2		1	3	1	3	(5)	(1)	208
3	(Italy) Mauro Baldi	(Switzerland) Team Sauber Mercedes	1	2	2	3	DNS	(4)	3	Ret	1	Ret	2	188
4	(United States) Eddie Cheever	(United Kingdom) Silk Cut Jaguar	Ret	1	1	1				2	Ret	1	3	182
5	(West Germany) Jochen Mass	(Switzerland) Team Sauber Mercedes	1		2	2	DNS	1	Ret	1	3	5	1	180
6	(West Germany) Klaus Ludwig	(West Germany) Blaupunkt-Joest Racing	3	Ret	5				2					145
6	(West Germany) Klaus Ludwig	(West Germany) Porsche AG					2					2		145
7	(West Germany) "John Winter"	(West Germany) Blaupunkt-Joest Racing	5	(8)	4	5	3	5	Ret	4	Ret	3		140
8	(West Germany) Frank Jelinski	(West Germany) Blaupunkt-Joest Racing	5	8	4	5	3		Ret	4	Ret	3		135
9	(France) Bob Wollek	(West Germany) Blaupunkt-Joest Racing	3	Ret	5	4		5	2	3	Ret	Ret		122
9	(France) Bob Wollek	(West Germany) Porsche AG					Ret							122
10	(Netherlands) Jan Lammers	(United Kingdom) Silk Cut Jaguar	Ret	Ret	Ret	Ret	1	3	Ret	8	2	Ret	4	118
11	(Denmark) John Nielsen	(United Kingdom) Silk Cut Jaguar	2	3			Ret	2	1			DNS		97
12	(United Kingdom) Johnny Dumfries	(United Kingdom) Silk Cut Jaguar	Ret	Ret	Ret	Ret	1	3	Ret	8	Ret	Ret	4	88
12	(United Kingdom) Ray Bellm	(United Kingdom) BP Spice Engineering	7	7	8	8	13	(7)	4	Ret	6	Ret	5	88
12	(United Kingdom) Gordon Spice	(United Kingdom) BP Spice Engineering	7	7	8	8	13	(7)	4	Ret	6	Ret	5	88
15	(Sweden) Stanley Dickens	(West Germany) Blaupunkt-Joest Racing				5	3							72
15	(Sweden) Stanley Dickens	(Japan) From A Racing										4		72
16	(Denmark) Thorkild Thyrring	(United Kingdom) BP Spice Engineering	Ret	11	10	6	Ret	8	5	13	5	11	NC	67
16	(Italy) Almo Coppelli	(United Kingdom) BP Spice Engineering	Ret	11	10	6	Ret	8	5	13	5			67
18	(West Germany) Manuel Reuter	(Switzerland) Brun Motorsport	6	4	Ret		Ret			5	4			58
18	(West Germany) Manuel Reuter	(West Germany) Porsche Kremer Racing										Ret		58
19	(Sweden) Stefan Johansson	(Switzerland) Team Sauber Mercedes								Ret	1		2	55
19	(Sweden) Stefan Johansson	(Japan) Toyota Team Tom's										21		55
20	(United Kingdom) James Weaver	(United Kingdom) Richard Lloyd Racing	4	DNS										54
20	(United Kingdom) James Weaver	(Switzerland) Team Sauber Mercedes				3	DNS	4	DNS					54
21	(Argentina) Oscar Larrauri	(Switzerland) Brun Motorsport	12	6	3					11	4			50
21	(Argentina) Oscar Larrauri	(West Germany) Leyton House with Porsche Kremer										16		50
22	(West Germany) Hans-Joachim Stuck	(West Germany) Porsche AG					2							45
23	(United Kingdom) John Watson	(United Kingdom) Silk Cut Jaguar	2	3			Ret		Ret					42
24	(Italy) Massimo Sigala	(Switzerland) Brun Motorsport	12	9	3		7							38
24	(Switzerland) Antoine Salamin	(Switzerland) Swiss Team Salamin	9	15	9	7		9	7	9	7		Ret	38
26	(Spain) Jésus Pareja	(Switzerland) Brun Motorsport	Ret	6	Ret		7			5				34
26	(West Germany) Uwe Schäfer	(Switzerland) Brun Motorsport	6	4	Ret		7			11				34
28	(United Kingdom) David Hobbs	(West Germany) Blaupunkt-Joest Racing				4	5							32
28	(United Kingdom) David Hobbs	(United Kingdom) Richard Lloyd Racing								7				32
29	(Republic of Ireland) Derek Daly	(United States) Silk Cut Jaguar					4							30
29	(Australia) Larry Perkins	(United States) Silk Cut Jaguar					4							30
29	(Austria) Franz Konrad	(West Germany) Blaupunkt-Joest Racing					5	6						30
29	(Austria) Franz Konrad	(West Germany) Victor Dauer Racing								Ret				30
32	(Japan) Hideki Okada	(West Germany) Porsche Kremer Racing					9							26
32	(Japan) Hideki Okada	(Japan) From A Racing										4		26
32	(Greece) Costas Los	(United Kingdom) GP Motorsport	8	Ret	Ret	Ret	Ret	Ret	6	16	Ret	13	Ret	26
34	(Italy) Paolo Barilla	(Japan) Toyota Team Tom's					24					21		24
34	(Italy) Paolo Barilla	(West Germany) Blaupunkt-Joest Racing								3	Ret			24
34	(Belgium) Didier Theys	(West Germany) Blaupunkt-Joest Racing					5							24
36	(West Germany) Volker Weidler	(West Germany) Porsche Kremer Racing		5	6					10		Ret		22
37	(United Kingdom) Derek Bell	(United Kingdom) Richard Lloyd Racing	4	DNS		DSQ					Ret			20
37	(United Kingdom) Derek Bell	(West Germany) Porsche AG					2							20
37	(United Kingdom) Derek Bell	(Australia) Takefuji Schuppan Racing Team										17		20
37	(France) Philippe Streiff	(West Germany) Blaupunkt-Joest Racing				4								20
37	(France) Philippe Streiff	(Switzerland) Team Sauber Mercedes										Ret		20
37	(Italy) Bruno Giacomelli	(West Germany) Porsche Kremer Racing			6		9			10		16		20
37	(Italy) Giovanni Lavaggi	(Italy) Luigi Taverna Technoracing			DNS									20
37	(Italy) Giovanni Lavaggi	(Switzerland) Swiss Team Salamin							7	9	7		Ret	20
41	(France) Jean-Louis Ricci	(United Kingdom) Chamberlain Engineering	10	10	11	12	Ret	DSQ	8	Ret	16	Ret	Ret	19
41	(France) Claude Ballot-Léna	(United Kingdom) Chamberlain Engineering	10	10	11	12	Ret	DSQ	8	Ret	16	Ret	Ret	19
43	(United States) Mario Andretti	(West Germany) Porsche AG					6							18
43	(United States) Michael Andretti	(West Germany) Porsche AG					6							18
43	(United States) John Andretti	(West Germany) Porsche AG					6							18
46	(Denmark) Kris Nissen	(West Germany) Porsche Kremer Racing		5		Ret	8							17
47	(South Africa) Wayne Taylor	(United Kingdom) Charles Ivey Racing Team Istel	13	Ret	Ret									16
47	(South Africa) Wayne Taylor	(United Kingdom) GP Motorsport				Ret	Ret		6	16	Ret			16
48	(United Kingdom) Nick Adams	(United Kingdom) Chamberlain Engineering	Ret	12	Ret	Ret	Ret	10	Ret	14	9		9	15
49	(Switzerland) Walter Brun	(Switzerland) Brun Motorsport	Ret	9	Ret					6	Ret			14
50	(Italy) Ranieri Randaccio	(Italy) Kelmar Racing	14	Ret	Ret	10		Ret	9	Ret	15		8	13
50	(Italy) Ranieri Randaccio	(Italy) Dollop Racing					Ret							13
Pos	Driver	Team	(Spain) JRZ	(Spain) JAR	(Italy) MON	(United Kingdom) SIL	(France) LMS	(Czech Republic) BRN	(United Kingdom) BRH	(West Germany) NUR	(Belgium) SPA	(Japan) FUJ	(Australia) SAN	Points

Colour	Result
Gold	Winner
Silver	Second place
Bronze	Third place
Green	Points classification
Blue	Non-points classification
Blue	Non-classified finish (NC)
Purple	Retired, not classified (Ret)
Red	Did not qualify (DNQ)
Red	Did not pre-qualify (DNPQ)
Black	Disqualified (DSQ)
White	Did not start (DNS)
White	Withdrew (WD)
White	Race cancelled (C)
Blank	Did not practice (DNP)
Blank	Did not arrive (DNA)
Blank	Excluded (EX)

==== FIA Cup for C2 Drivers ====
Pos	Driver	Team	(Spain) JRZ	(Spain) JAR	(Italy) MON	(United Kingdom) SIL	(France) LMS	(Czech Republic) BRN	(United Kingdom) BRH	(West Germany) NUR	(Belgium) SPA	(Japan) FUJ	(Australia) SAN	Points
1	(United Kingdom) Ray Bellm	(United Kingdom) BP Spice Engineering	1	1	1	2	1	(1)	1	Ret	2	Ret	(1)	260
1	(United Kingdom) Gordon Spice	(United Kingdom) BP Spice Engineering	1	1	1	2	1	(1)	1	Ret	2	Ret	(1)	260
3	(Denmark) Thorkild Thyrring	(United Kingdom) BP Spice Engineering	Ret	(3)	2	1	Ret	2	2	2	1	1	NC	225
4	(Italy) Almo Coppelli	(United Kingdom) BP Spice Engineering	Ret	3	2	1	Ret	2	2	2	1			197
5	(Italy) Vito Veninata	(Italy) Kelmar Racing	7	5	Ret	3		4	5	1	(7)	3		130
6	(France) Claude Ballot-Léna	(United Kingdom) Chamberlain Engineering	3	2	3	5	Ret	DSQ	4	Ret	10	Ret	Ret	101
6	(France) Jean-Louis Ricci	(United Kingdom) Chamberlain Engineering	3	2	3	5	Ret	DSQ	4	Ret	10	Ret	Ret	101
8	(Greece) Costas Los	(United Kingdom) GP Motorsport	2	Ret	Ret	Ret	Ret	Ret	3	5	Ret	2	Ret	100
9	(Italy) Pasquale Barberio	(Italy) Kelmar Racing	7	5	Ret	3		4		1	7			98
10	(United Kingdom) John Sheldon	(United Kingdom) ADA Engineering		6					Ret					74
10	(United Kingdom) John Sheldon	(United Kingdom) Charles Ivey Racing Team Istel					3							74
10	(United Kingdom) John Sheldon	(United Kingdom) Roy Baker Racing								6				74
10	(United Kingdom) John Sheldon	(Norway) Team Lucky Strike Schanche									4			74
11	(Italy) Ranieri Randaccio	(Italy) Kelmar Racing	6	Ret	Ret	3		Ret	5	Ret	9	3	3	68
12	(Japan) Jirou Yaneyama	(United Kingdom) ADA Engineering					2							65
12	(Japan) Jirou Yaneyama	(Japan) British Barn Racing Team										4		65
13	(United Kingdom) Nick Adams	(United Kingdom) Chamberlain Engineering	Ret	4	Ret	Ret	Ret	3	Ret	3	3		4	56
13	(South Africa) Wayne Taylor	(United Kingdom) Charles Ivey Racing Team Istel	5	Ret	Ret									56
13	(South Africa) Wayne Taylor	(United Kingdom) GP Motorsport				Ret	Ret		3	5	Ret			56
13	(United States) Olindo Iacobelli	(United Kingdom) PC Automotive			Ret	6	Ret		7	4	5			56
13	(United Kingdom) Richard Piper	(United Kingdom) PC Automotive			Ret	6			7	4	5			56
17	(United Kingdom) Richard Jones	(United Kingdom) Chamberlain Engineering					Ret			3	3			48
18	(United Kingdom) Ian Harrower	(United Kingdom) ADA Engineering		6			2							45
19	(Norway) Martin Schanche	(Norway) Team Lucky Strike Schanche	4	8	Ret	Ret	7		6					44
20	(United Kingdom) Tim Harvey	(United Kingdom) Charles Ivey Racing Team Istel	5	Ret	Ret	4	3		8					42
21	(Chile) Eliseo Salazar	(United Kingdom) BP Spice Engineering					Ret					1	NC	40

=== Teams championships ===
==== World Sports Prototype Championship for Teams ====
Pos	Team	(Spain) JRZ	(Spain) JAR	(Italy) MON	(United Kingdom) SIL	(France) LMS	(Czech Republic) BRN	(United Kingdom) BRH	(West Germany) NUR	(Belgium) SPA	(Japan) FUJ	(Australia) SAN	Points
1	(United Kingdom) Silk Cut Jaguar	2	1	1	1	1	2	1	2	2	1	3	357
2	(Switzerland) Team Sauber Mercedes	1	2	2	2	DNS	1	3	1	1	5	1	275
3	(West Germany) Blaupunkt-Joest Racing	3	8	4	5	3	5	2	3	Ret	3		189
4	(Switzerland) Brun Motorsport	6	4	3		7			5	4			94
5	(United Kingdom) Spice Engineering	7	7	8	6	13	7	4	13	5	11	5	78
6	(West Germany) Porsche AG					2					2		75
7	(Switzerland) Swiss Team Salamin	9	15	9	7		9	7	9	7		Ret	38
8	(West Germany) Porsche Kremer Racing		5	6	Ret	8			10		16		31
9	(United Kingdom) Richard Lloyd Racing	4	DNS		DSQ				7	Ret			28
10	(Japan) From A Racing										4		20
11	(United Kingdom) GP Motorsport	8	Ret	Ret	Ret	Ret	Ret	6	16	Ret	13	Ret	18
12	(United Kingdom) Chamberlain Engineering	10	10	11	12	Ret	10	8	14	9	19	9	16
13	(Japan) Advan Alpha Nova										6		12
13	(United Kingdom) Team Davey					Ret	DNS		Ret	8	Ret	6	12
15	(Italy) Kelmar Racing	14	13	Ret	10		11	9	12	13	15	8	9
16	(France) Primagaz Compétition			7		NC							8
16	(Australia) Rothmans Porsche Team Schuppan										7		8
18	(Japan) Leyton House Racing Team										8		6
19	(Japan) Mazdaspeed Co. Ltd.				9	15					14		4
19	(Japan) Nissan Motorsports					Ret					9		4
19	(United Kingdom) ADA Engineering	NC	14		NC	18		Ret				7	4
19	(Norway) Team Lucky Strike Schanche	11	17	Ret	Ret	25		10	Ret	10			4
23	(Australia) Takefuji Schuppan Racing Team					10					17		3
24	(Japan) Trust Racing Team										10		2
25	(Germany) Walter Maurer Racing								Ret			10	1

Colour	Result
Gold	Winner
Silver	Second place
Bronze	Third place
Green	Points classification
Blue	Non-points classification
Blue	Non-classified finish (NC)
Purple	Retired, not classified (Ret)
Red	Did not qualify (DNQ)
Red	Did not pre-qualify (DNPQ)
Black	Disqualified (DSQ)
White	Did not start (DNS)
White	Withdrew (WD)
White	Race cancelled (C)
Blank	Did not practice (DNP)
Blank	Did not arrive (DNA)
Blank	Excluded (EX)

==== FIA Cup for C2 Teams ====
Pos	Team	(Spain) JRZ	(Spain) JAR	(Italy) MON	(United Kingdom) SIL	(France) LMS	(Czech Republic) BRN	(United Kingdom) BRH	(West Germany) NUR	(Belgium) SPA	(Japan) FUJ	(Australia) SAN	Points
1	(United Kingdom) BP Spice Engineering	1	1	1	1	1	1	1	2	1	1	1	390
2	(United Kingdom) Chamberlain Engineering	3	2	3	5	Ret	3	4	3	3	5	4	185
3	(Italy) Kelmar Racing	6	5		3		4	5	1	7	3	3	154
4	(United Kingdom) GP Motorsport	2	Ret	Ret	Ret	Ret	Ret	3	5	Ret	2	Ret	100
5	(United Kingdom) Charles Ivey Racing Team Istel	5	Ret	Ret	4	3		8					78
6	(United Kingdom) ADA Engineering	8	6		NC	2		Ret				2	72
7	(Norway) Team Lucky Strike Schanche	4	8	Ret	Ret	7		6	Ret	4			67
8	(United Kingdom) PC Automotive			Ret	6	Ret		7	4	5			56
9	(United Kingdom) Roy Baker Racing				7	6	5	NC	6	Ret		NC	46
10	(France) MT Sport Racing					4			Ret	8		Ret	36
10	(France) Automobiles Louis Descartes	Ret	Ret	Ret	8	5	Ret	Ret	Ret	11		5	36
12	(Japan) British Barn Racing Team										4		20
13	(Switzerland) Pierre-Alain Lombardi			Ret		NC			Ret	6			12
14	(West Germany) Walter Maurer Racing								Ret			5	8
15	(Italy) Dollop Racing	Ret	7	Ret	Ret								4
15	(Italy) Luigi Taverna Technoracing			DNS	9	DNS							4
