= 1989 ADAC Supercup =

Seasons
- ← 1988 none →

The SAT 1 Supercup '89 was the fourth and final season of the Supercup, a West German auto racing series organized by the ADAC and sponsored by SAT 1 television. Held over five events in West Germany and Great Britain, the driver's championship was won by Frenchmen Bob Wollek; his team Joest Racing won the team's championship. The series was canceled following the 1989 season, ending a yearly series of German sports car championships dating back to 1972.

== Entries ==
=== C1 ===
Team	Car	Engine	Tyre	No.	Driver	Rounds
(Germany) Blaupunkt Sachs Joest Racing	Porsche 962C	Porsche 3.0 L Turbo Flat-6	G	1	(France) Bob Wollek	All
(Germany) Blaupunkt Sachs Joest Racing	Porsche 962C	Porsche 3.0 L Turbo Flat-6	G	2	(Germany) "John Winter"	All
(Germany) Blaupunkt Sachs Joest Racing	Porsche 962C	Porsche 3.0 L Turbo Flat-6	G	10	(France) Jean-Louis Ricci	1–3
(Germany) Blaupunkt Sachs Joest Racing	Porsche 962C	Porsche 3.0 L Turbo Flat-6	G	11	(Germany) Frank Jelinski	3
(Switzerland) Jägermeister Brun Motorsport	Porsche 962C	Porsche 3.0 L Turbo Flat-6	Y	3	(Switzerland) Walter Brun	1, 3–5
(Switzerland) Jägermeister Brun Motorsport	Porsche 962C	Porsche 3.0 L Turbo Flat-6	Y	4	(Argentina) Oscar Larrauri	3, 5
(Switzerland) Jägermeister Brun Motorsport	Porsche 962C	Porsche 3.0 L Turbo Flat-6	Y	4	(Austria) Franz Konrad	4
(Germany) Dauer Racing	Porsche 962C	Porsche 3.0 L Turbo Flat-6	G	5	(Germany) Jochen Dauer	All
(Germany) Jim Busby/Dauer Racing	Porsche 962C	Porsche 3.0 L Turbo Flat-6	BF	6	(United States) John Andretti	3
(Germany) Jumbo Racing Team	Porsche 962C	Porsche 3.0 L Turbo Flat-6	G	7	(Germany) Heinz-Jörgen Dahmen	1, 3–5
(Switzerland) Swiss Team Salamin	Porsche 962C	Porsche 3.0 L Turbo Flat-6	G	8	(Switzerland) Antoine Salamin	1–3, 5
(Austria) Walter Lechner Racing School	Porsche 962C	Porsche 3.0 L Turbo Flat-6	D	9	(Austria) Walter Lechner	All
(Germany) Porsche Kremer Racing	Porsche 962CK6	Porsche 3.0 L Turbo Flat-6	Y	12	(South Africa) George Fouché	4–5
(United Kingdom) Richard Lloyd Racing	Porsche 962C GTi	Porsche 3.0 L Turbo Flat-6	G	14	(United Kingdom) Tiff Needell	2
(Germany) Bernal Torentriebe Team Gebhardt	Gebhardt 88 C2	Audi 1.8 L Turbo I4	G	15	(Germany) Rudi Seher	4–5
(France) John Salmona	Cheetah G604	Aston Martin 5.3 L V8	G	20	(France) John Salmona	1, 3, 5
(United Kingdom) Spice Engineering	Spice SE89C	Ford Cosworth DFZ 3.5 L V8	G	22	(Greece) Costas Los	2
(United Kingdom) Nissan Motor Sports Europe	Nissan R89C	Nissan VRH35Z 3.5 L Turbo V8	D	23	(United Kingdom) Martin Donnelly	4
(United Kingdom) Nissan Motor Sports Europe	Nissan R89C	Nissan VRH35Z 3.5 L Turbo V8	D	23	(United Kingdom) Julian Bailey	5
(Germany) Momo Gebhardt Racing	Porsche 962	Porsche 3.0 L Turbo Flat-6	G	30	(Italy) Gianpiero Moretti	1, 3
(Germany) Momo Gebhardt Racing	Porsche 962	Porsche 3.0 L Turbo Flat-6	G	30	(Austria) Franz Konrad	5
(United Kingdom) Team Davey	Porsche 962C	Porsche 3.0 L Turbo Flat-6	D	31	(United Kingdom) Tim Lee-Davey	2

=== C2 ===
Team	Car	Engine	Tyre	No.	Driver	Rounds
(United Kingdom) GP Motorsport	Spice SE87C	Ford Cosworth DFL 3.3 L V8	G	51	(France) Philippe de Henning	All
(Germany) Karl-Heinz Becker	Lola T600	BMW 1.7 L Turbo I4	G	52	(Germany) Karl-Heinz Becker	All
(Germany) Pero Racing	Argo JM19	Porsche 3.0 L Turbo Flat-6	G	53	(Germany) Helmut Gall	2–5
(Germany) Bernal Torentriebe Team Gebhardt	Gebhardt JC873; Gebhardt 88 C2	Audi 1.8 L Turbo I4	G	54	(Germany) Rudi Seher	1–3
(France) Automobiles Louis Descartes	ALD 04	BMW M88 3.5 L I6	G	55	(France) Marc Rostan	5
(France) Automobiles Louis Descartes	ALD C289	Ford Cosworth DFL 3.3 L V8	G	56	(France) Louis Descartes	5
(Switzerland) R. Jauslin Cars	Argo JM19B	Ford Cosworth DFL 3.3 L V8	G	57	(Switzerland) Ruedi Jauslin	1, 3–5
(Germany) Fritz Wagner	Wagner FW0013	BMW 3.0 L I6	G	58	(Germany) Fritz Wagner	1, 3–5
(Germany) Walter Maurer	Maurer C87	BMW 2.0 L Turbo I4	D	60	(Germany) Walter Maurer	1, 3–5
France Prototeam	Argo JM19C	Ford Cosworth DFL 3.3 L V8	G	61	(France) Thierry Lecerf	1–2
France Prototeam	Spice SE88C	Ford Cosworth DFL 3.3 L V8	G	62	(France) Pierre-François Rousselot	1
(Germany) Style Auto Racing Team	Rieger CJ 84	Porsche 3.0 L Turbo Flat-6	G	63	(Germany) Michael Roger Neumann	5
(United Kingdom) ADA Engineering	ADA 02	Ford Cosworth DFL 3.3 L V8	G	64	(United Kingdom) Paul Stott	2
(United Kingdom) John Bartlett	Harrier LR7	Chevrolet 5.7 L V8	A	65	(United Kingdom) John Bartlett	2
(United Kingdom) Ecurie Ecosse	Ecosse C285	Ford Cosworth DFL 3.3 L V8	G	65	(United Kingdom) Laurence Jacobson	5
(United Kingdom) Chamberlain Engineering	Spice SE89C	Ford Cosworth DFL 3.3 L V8	G	66	(United Kingdom) Nick Adams	2
(United Kingdom) Team Istel	Spice SE89C	Ford Cosworth DFL 3.3 L V8	A	67	(United Kingdom) Tim Harvey	2
(Germany) Dieter Bergermann	Argo JM19C	Ford Cosworth DFL 3.3 L V8		69	(Germany) Dieter Bergermann	5
(United Kingdom) Roy Baker Racing	Tiga GC289	Ford Cosworth DFL 3.3 L V8	G	70	(United Kingdom) Dudley Wood	3
(United Kingdom) Roy Baker Racing	Tiga GC289	Ford Cosworth DFL 3.3 L V8	G	70	(United Kingdom) Chris Ashmore	5
(Germany) Peter Stürtz Motorsport	Stürtz SM C288	BMW Turbo	D	71	(Germany) Harald Grohs	3–5
(Germany) Bross Druck Chemie Racing	Argo JM19C	Ford Cosworth DFL 3.3 L V8	G	72	(United Kingdom) David Coyne	3
(Germany) Bross Druck Chemie Racing	Argo JM19C	Ford Cosworth DFL 3.3 L V8	G	72	(Germany) Rolf Götz	4
(Germany) Bross Druck Chemie Racing	Argo JM19C	Ford Cosworth DFL 3.3 L V8	G	72	(Netherlands) Cor Euser	5
(United Kingdom) Gordon Horn Racing	Argo JM19B	Zakspeed 1.9 L Turbo I4	G	73	(United Kingdom) Robin Smith	5

== Schedule and results ==
The series ventured outside West Germany for the first time, replacing the traditional Hockenheimring event with a race at the Silverstone Circuit in Great Britain. The Silverstone round allowed many competitors from the BRDC Sportscar Championship to compete alongside the Supercup. The other four events of the series remained in their calendar positions.

Rnd	Event	Circuit	Location	Date	C1 Winning Driver	C2 Winning Driver
Rnd	Event	Circuit	Location	Date	C1 Winning Team	C2 Winning Team
1	51st Internationales ADAC Eifelrennen	Nürburgring	Nürburg, West Germany	30 April	(France) Bob Wollek	(France) Pierre-François Rousselot
1	51st Internationales ADAC Eifelrennen	Nürburgring	Nürburg, West Germany	30 April	(Germany) Blaupunkt Sachs Joest Racing	France Prototeam
2	Autosport BRDC Supersprint	Silverstone Circuit	Northamptonshire, United Kingdom	15 May	(France) Bob Wollek	(United Kingdom) Tim Harvey
2	Autosport BRDC Supersprint	Silverstone Circuit	Northamptonshire, United Kingdom	15 May	(Germany) Blaupunkt Sachs Joest Racing	(United Kingdom) Team Istel
3	200 Meilen von Nürnberg	Norisring	Nuremberg, West Germany	25 June	(Germany) Frank Jelinski	(France) Philippe de Henning
3	200 Meilen von Nürnberg	Norisring	Nuremberg, West Germany	25 June	(Germany) Joest Racing	(United Kingdom) GP Motorsport
4	22nd Internationales ADAC Flugplatzrennen	Diepholz Airfield Circuit	Diepholz, West Germany	6 August	(United Kingdom) Martin Donnelly	(Switzerland) Ruedi Jauslin
4	22nd Internationales ADAC Flugplatzrennen	Diepholz Airfield Circuit	Diepholz, West Germany	6 August	(United Kingdom) Nissan Motor Sports Europe	(Switzerland) R. Jauslin Cars
5	Internationales ADAC Bilstein Super Sprint	Nürburgring	Nürburg, West Germany	24 September	(France) Bob Wollek	(United Kingdom) Robin Smith
5	Internationales ADAC Bilstein Super Sprint	Nürburgring	Nürburg, West Germany	24 September	(Germany) Blaupunkt Sachs Joest Racing	(United Kingdom) Gordon Horn Racing
