= Walter Maurer =

Walter Maurer may refer to:

- Walter Maurer (wrestler) (1893–1983), American wrestler
- Walter Maurer (artist) (born 1942), German designer and university lecturer
