= Dauer 962 Le Mans =

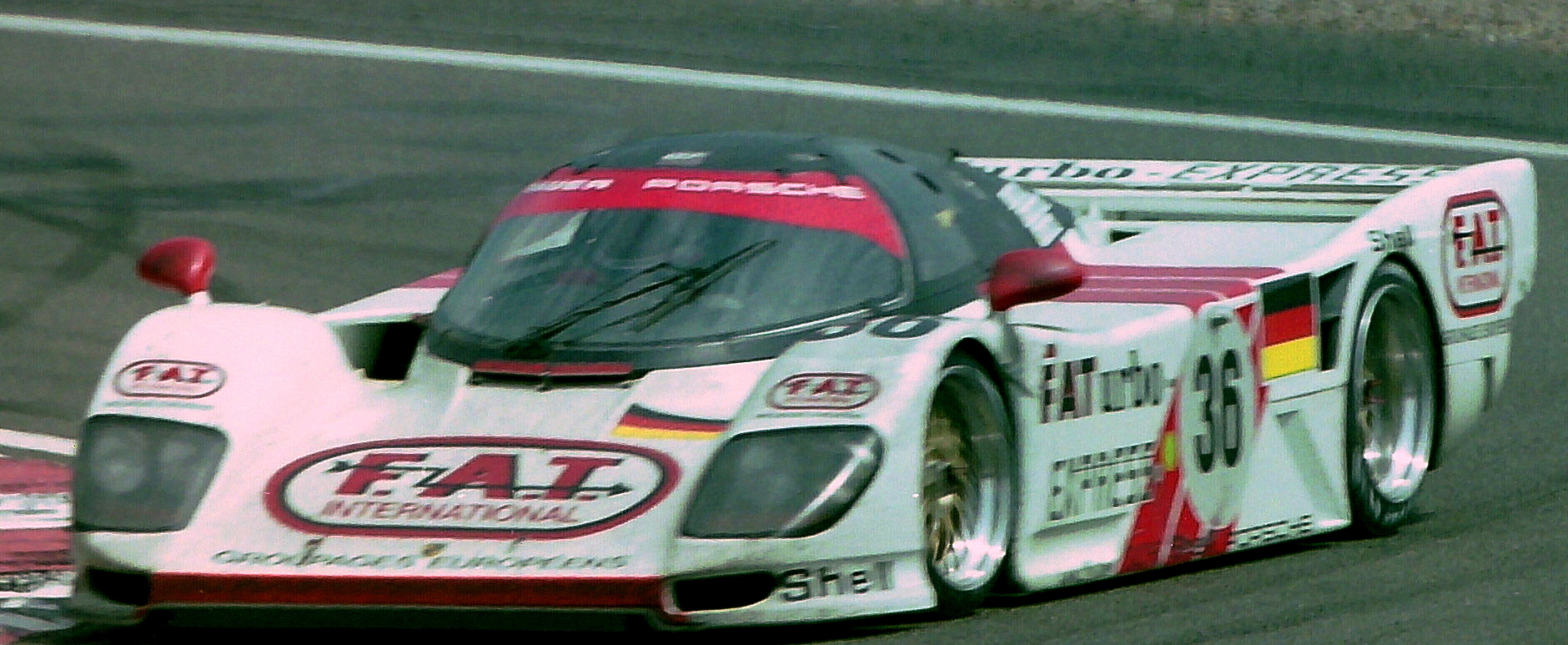

Overview
- Manufacturer: Dauer Sportwagen
- Production: 1993–1997 (13 cars)
- Designer: Achim Storz of Porsche

Body and chassis
- Class: Sports car (S); Racing car
- Body style: 2-door coupe
- Layout: Rear mid-engine, rear-wheel-drive
- Related: Porsche 962

Powertrain
- Engine: 3.0 L Porsche Type 935 KKK twin-turbocharged flat-6
- Transmission: 5-speed manual

Dimensions
- Length: 4,650 mm (183.1 in)
- Width: 1,985 mm (78.1 in)
- Height: 1,050 mm (41.3 in)
- Curb weight: 1,080 kg (2,381.0 lb)

The Dauer 962 Le Mans is a sports car based on the Porsche 962 Group C racing car. Built by German Jochen Dauer's Dauer Racing, a racing version of this car went on to win the 1994 24 Hours of Le Mans with the support of Porsche in LMGT1 group.

The first road car debuted at the 1993 Frankfurt Auto Show. In total 13 cars were made.

== Changes to meet road regulations ==
Dauer Racing (now Dauer Sportwagen) produced the 962 Le Mans from stripped down Porsche 962 bodies for modification.

Components of the bodywork were replaced with slightly revised carbon fiber and kevlar panels. The under tray was replaced with a flat version for better stability at high speeds. A second seat and leather upholstery were installed in the cramped cockpit, as well as a video screen for DVD playback in later years. A small compartment was added to the front of the car to carry luggage. A hydraulic suspension system was also added to meet German ride height requirements for street cars.

== Specifications ==
The 962 Le Mans uses nearly the same engine as the racing 962: Porsche's water-cooled Type-935, 2994 cc Flat-6 with two KKK (Kühnle, Kopp und Kausch AG) turbochargers. Since the road car did not have to meet racing regulations, the air restrictor was removed allowing for an output of approximately 730 PS (720 hp; 537 kW). The 5-speed racing gearbox was also retained.

The drivetrain also stood the same, being rear-wheel-drive.

A top speed of 404.6 km/h (251.4 mph) was independently measured in 1998. Other performance figures included a 0-100 km/h (62.1 mph) in 2.8 seconds and 0-200 km/h (124.3 mph) in 7.3 seconds. The Dauer 962 was called the 'fastest street-legal production car in the world' in the September 2003 issue of Evo magazine. It was succeeded by the Bugatti Veyron which reached 408.47 km/h (253.81 mph) in 2007.

== Motorsports ==
Following rule changes in the World Sportscar Championship in 1992 which saw Porsche 962 numbers dwindle in Europe, including at the 24 Hours of Le Mans, Porsche was looking for ways to continue their sports car efforts. Although 962s were still legal at Le Mans, the cars were subjected to newer technical regulations that negatively affected their performance, subsequently ceasing to be competitive against the current top entrants in its class.

With the re-introduction of production-based grand tourer-style cars in 1993, the Automobile Club de l'Ouest (ACO) had created a loophole as no specific number of road-going examples was established within its homologation requirements. With Dauer's success in modifying a Porsche 962 into a street-legal car in 1993, Porsche saw an opportunity to bring the 962 back into competition.

With the first production car shown to the public in 1993, Porsche had only to meet certain design criteria, such as the requirement that production-based cars have storage space for a typical suitcase had already been fulfilled, as the Dauer road car was able to carry luggage. The flat bottom of the 962 Le Mans also fit with GT rules. Three more modifications were necessary to fully comply: the use of narrower tires than the 962 had run in Group C, a larger fuel tank (now up to 120 litres) and the reinstallation of an air restrictor for the engine, although this one would be larger than the one they had run in Group C.

The flat bottom and narrow tires of the 962 Le Mans would hinder the performance of the car over the long laps at Le Mans even with the increased power from the GT-class air restrictor. However, Porsche believed that the larger fuel tank they were allowed in the GT-class would allow them to overcome this lack of speed by spending less time in the pits than the Group C cars, something which is key for an endurance race.

A total of two Dauer 962 Le Mans race cars were built. The cars were built using 962 monocoques with numbers 173 and 176, respectively for Dauer chassis number GT002 and GT003. A third chassis with Dauer number GT001, using monocoque number 169, was available at Le Mans but was not used. All three were Fabcar monocoques.

Arriving at Le Mans with the support of Porsche's factory racing team, Joest Racing, Dauer's two cars showed that they lacked the overall pace of the top Group C cars by qualifying fifth and seventh. However, their pace in their class was shattering as the next closest GT1-class car could only muster 12th. The race saw Porsche's plan pan out, as the Dauer 962 Le Mans were able to gradually make their way to the top of the standings while their competitors spent time in the pits or succumbed to mechanical woes. In the end, only a lone Toyota 94C-V in the Group C class could contend with the Dauers, taking second place overall. The Dauer 962 Le Mans of Yannick Dalmas, Hurley Haywood and Mauro Baldi would take the overall win, while the second team car would finish one lap behind in third place overall.

Soon after this event the ACO attempted to fix the loophole in the GT regulations by setting a minimum requirement for production cars to meet homologation standards. With this, the Dauer 962s would never race again, nor would the normal Porsche 962s as the Group C class was finally abandoned. However, in practice, semi-sports prototypes that are related to a production car were still able to obtain GT1 homologation with just one road-going car, as Porsche themselves proved with the Porsche 911 GT1 two years later.
