= Dauer Sportwagen =

Automobile manufacturer

(Germany) Dauer Sportwagen
- Founded: 1987; 39 years ago
- Team principal(s): Jochen Dauer
- Former series: Supercup; Interserie; World Sports-Prototype Championship; Camel GT Championship
- Teams' Championships: 1 (Interserie 1988)
- Drivers' Championships: 1 (Interserie 1988)

Dauer Sportwagen GmbH was a German automotive company founded by former racing driver Jochen Dauer in Nuremberg. Initially founded as Jochen Dauer Racing in 1987, the racing team had several years of participation in the German Supercup and European Interserie championships, as well as occasional runs in the World Sports-Prototype Championship and Camel GT Championships with the Porsche 962. Following the demise of sports prototype racing in the early 1990s, Dauer Racing GmbH was created to begin limited production of road cars, including a road-legal version of the 962, known as the Dauer 962 Le Mans, which later went on to win the 1994 24 Hours of Le Mans. Once changing to Dauer Sportwagen, the company sold a continuation of the Bugatti EB110. The company went bankrupt in 2008 and parts for the EB110 were transferred to Toscana-Motors GmbH, with the intellectual property pertaining to the 962 bought by a Luxembourg-based company.

== History ==
=== Early racing ===
For several years, Jochen Dauer had run for a number of teams, mainly in the Deutsche Rennsport Meisterschaft and its successor championship, the ADAC Supercup. Dauer Racing purchased John Fitzpatrick's successful team, including all racing cars, team transporters and equipment at the end of 1986. Dauer also purchased a Zakspeed C1/8. Dauer was able to secure sponsorship from the Victor Computer company, and confirmed a full-season campaign in the Supercup for the 962C, while the Zakspeed car would run in the Interserie. Jochen Dauer was the sole driver of the machines in both championships. Towards the end of 1987, Dauer also chose to enter the World Sports-Prototype Championship, with Johnny Dumfries and Harald Grohs co-driving in the endurance events.

Dauer Racing continued to run their old Zakspeed as well as another newly purchased Porsche 962 (chassis 962-133) in Supercup and Interserie into 1988, and earned their first victory in the Interserie event at Autodrom Most, followed by a one-two victory at Zeltweg Airfield with Franz Konrad in the second entry. Jochen Dauer won the Interserie drivers championship for the year.

In 1989, Dauer Racing chose to concentrate fully on the World Championship and Supercup, only occasionally attending Interserie events. Franz Konrad remained as the co-driver initially, but was later replaced by Will Hoy. Tic Tacs replaced Victor Computer as the team's primary sponsor. Dauer Racing struggled in the World Championship, finishing only one race in which they competed in. In Supercup however, the team finished second in the championship behind the dominant Joest Racing squad, although no victories were earned during the year, nor in the Interserie.

By 1990, the Supercup championship had been canceled. Seeking new areas with which to race the team's 962s, Dauer entered a team in the Camel GT Championship in North America, while the European squad was merged with Konrad Motorsport for a joint entry in the World Championship. Both squads struggled to complete races eventually withdrew from their respective championships before the year was completed. Strapped for cash, Dauer Racing made a last-ditch effort at the 24 Hours of Daytona in 1991, entering two 962s. One car was driven by Mario, Michael, and Jeff Andretti to a fifth-place finish overall, while the other featured Al, Al Jr., Bobby, and Robby Unser, although it failed to finish. After this, Dauer Racing withdrew from motorsport.

=== Converting 962s ===
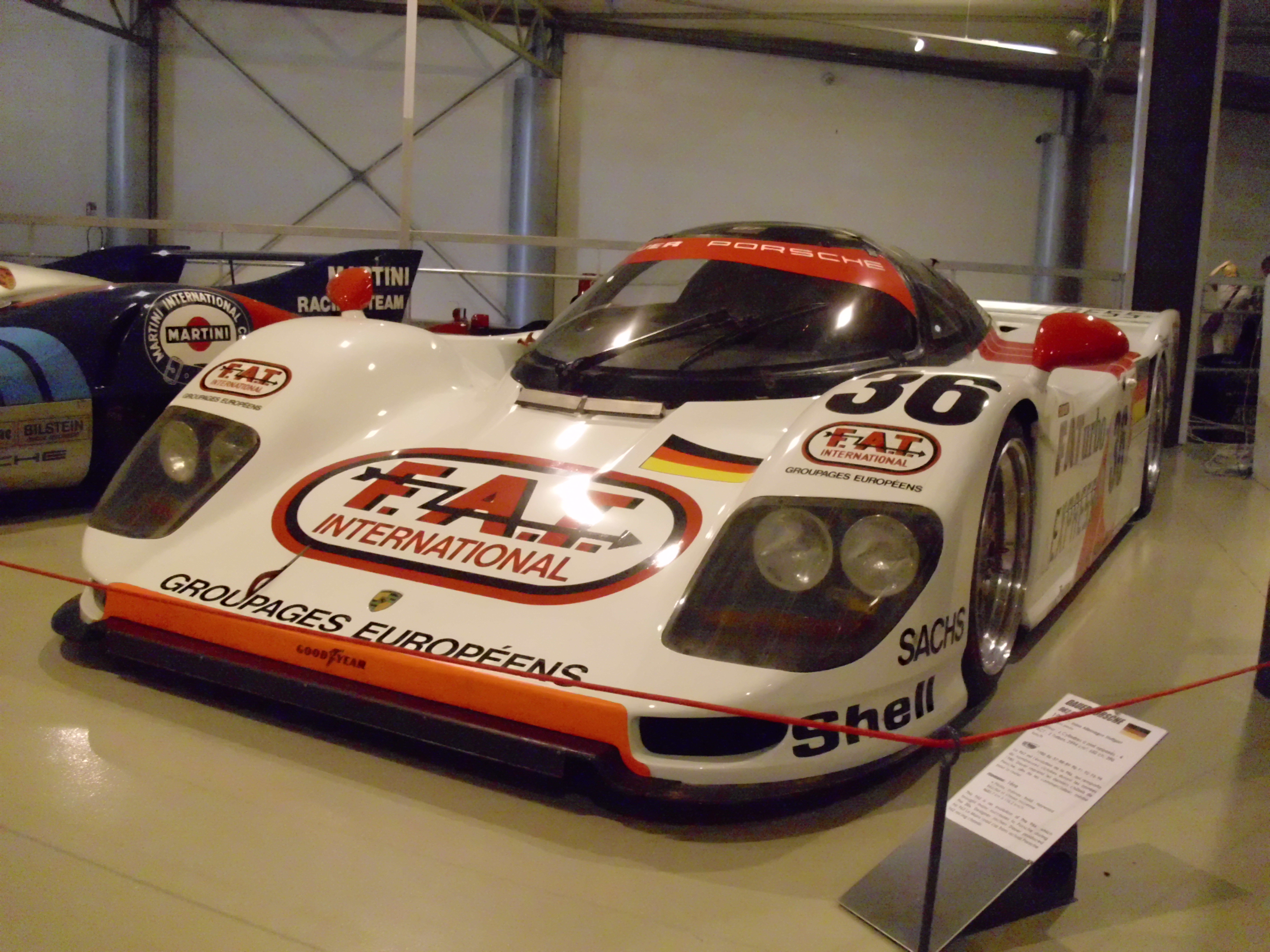
Dauer 962 Le Mans

Shortly after Dauer Racing was closed, Jochen Dauer began work on converting a Porsche 962 so that it could be used by the public on the street. Dauer Sportwagen was created from the remnants of Dauer Racing, and conversion of Porsche 962 chassis #169 began. By the Frankfurt Auto Show of 1993, the first Dauer 962 Le Mans was completed and put on display. Porsche assisted in providing numerous customer parts that had been developed for the 962, as well as assistance in developing new parts necessary to make the 962 legal for the streets. Once the first car was completed, Porsche approached Dauer about converting the next two chassis to race cars once again, in an attempt to re-enter the 24 Hours of Le Mans under the new production-based grand tourer regulations, rather than the 962's previous Group C class. Running the Dauer 962s under a different class allowed it to use a larger fuel tank and a larger air restrictor.

Successfully completed by June 1994, the next two chassis were entered by the factory Porsche team, running in a production-based classification thanks to new regulations. Drivers Yannick Dalmas, Hurley Haywood, and Mauro Baldi won the race overall, while the second car finished in third place. The following year the regulations were changed once again, and Dauer's 962s were not to race again.

Emphasis returned to production of the 962 Le Mans road cars. Although only a couple were ordered each year, the cars continued to be sold for several more years.

=== Purchase of the remains of Bugatti ===
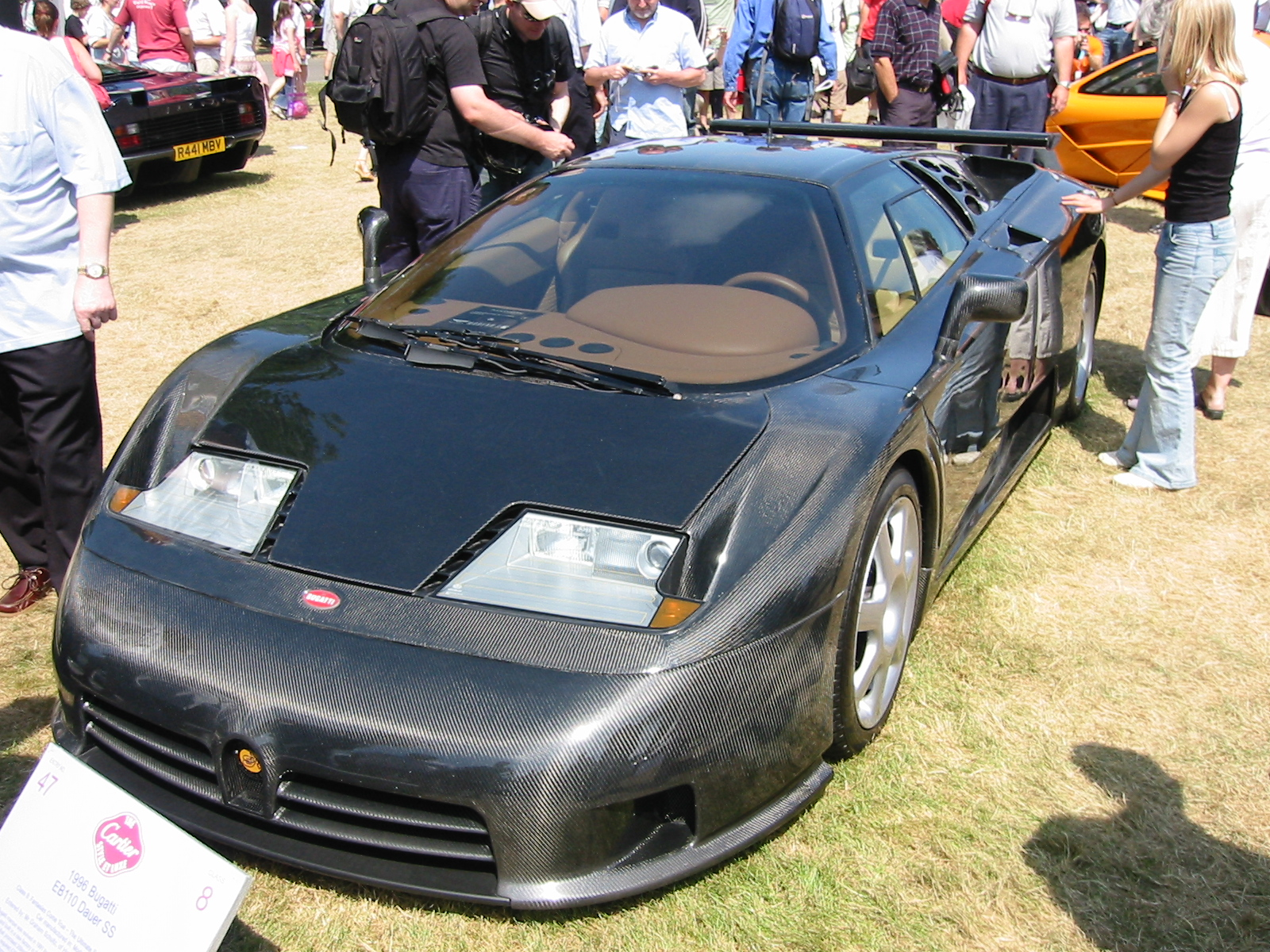
A Dauer EB110 SS, featuring an unpainted carbon fiber body

In 1995, Romano Artioli's Bugatti Automobili SpA went bankrupt and the company was eventually liquidated. During an auction held in 1997, Dauer Sportwagen bought most of the remains of the company, including spare parts and five unfinished EB110 chassis. Dauer began immediate development and refinement of the EB110's design in hopes of continuing production.

By 2001, Dauer had completed their alterations to the EB110s and offered the five chassis they had finished for sale. The cars, based on the SS version of the EB110, re-added the four-wheel drive system that had been on the standard EB110 but not included on the original SS models. The increased weight of the four-wheel drive was offset by new carbon fiber bodywork which was 200 kg lighter than the standard bodywork. The engines were remapped and power was increased to upwards of 705 PS (519 kW; 695 hp).

== Current sales ==
Dauer Sportwagen continues to convert Porsche 962s for customers who can provide a used chassis. The company also sells parts for the Bugatti EB110, as well as the remaining EB110s the company converted.
