= 1988 360 km of Jarama =

Layout of the Circuito Permanente Del Jarama (1980-1989)

The 1988 360 km of Jarama was the second round of the 1988 World Sportscar Championship season. It took place at Circuito Permanente Del Jarama, Spain on March 13, 1988.

== Official results ==
Class winners in bold. Cars failing to complete 75% of the winner's distance marked as Not Classified (NC).

Pos	Class	No	Team	Drivers	Chassis	Tyre	Laps
Pos	Class	No	Team	Drivers	Engine	Tyre	Laps
1	**C1**	**1**	**(United Kingdom) Silk Cut Jaguar**	**(United Kingdom) Martin Brundle (United States) Eddie Cheever**	**Jaguar XJR-9**	D	**109**
1	**C1**	**1**	**(United Kingdom) Silk Cut Jaguar**	**(United Kingdom) Martin Brundle (United States) Eddie Cheever**	**Jaguar 7.0L V12**	D	**109**
2	C1	61	(Switzerland) Team Sauber Mercedes	(France) Jean-Louis Schlesser (Italy) Mauro Baldi	Sauber C9	M	109
2	C1	61	(Switzerland) Team Sauber Mercedes	(France) Jean-Louis Schlesser (Italy) Mauro Baldi	Mercedes-Benz M117 5.0L Turbo V8	M	109
3	C1	3	(United Kingdom) Silk Cut Jaguar	(United Kingdom) John Watson (Denmark) John Nielsen	Jaguar XJR-9	D	107
3	C1	3	(United Kingdom) Silk Cut Jaguar	(United Kingdom) John Watson (Denmark) John Nielsen	Jaguar 7.0L V12	D	107
4	C1	5	(Switzerland) Brun Motorsport	(Germany) Manuel Reuter (Germany) Uwe Schäfer	Porsche 962C	M	107
4	C1	5	(Switzerland) Brun Motorsport	(Germany) Manuel Reuter (Germany) Uwe Schäfer	Porsche Type-935 3.0L Turbo Flat-6	M	107
5	C1	10	(Germany) Porsche Kremer Racing	(Germany) Volker Weidler (Denmark) Kris Nissen	Porsche 962C	Y	106
5	C1	10	(Germany) Porsche Kremer Racing	(Germany) Volker Weidler (Denmark) Kris Nissen	Porsche Type-935 3.0L Turbo Flat-6	Y	106
6	C1	6	(Switzerland) Brun Motorsport	(Argentina) Oscar Larrauri (Spain) Jesús Pareja	Porsche 962C	M	106
6	C1	6	(Switzerland) Brun Motorsport	(Argentina) Oscar Larrauri (Spain) Jesús Pareja	Porsche Type-935 3.0L Turbo Flat-6	M	106
7	**C2**	**111**	**(United Kingdom) Spice Engineering**	**(United Kingdom) Ray Bellm (United Kingdom) Gordon Spice**	**Spice SE88C**	G	**104**
7	**C2**	**111**	**(United Kingdom) Spice Engineering**	**(United Kingdom) Ray Bellm (United Kingdom) Gordon Spice**	**Ford Cosworth DFL 3.3L V8**	G	**104**
8	C1	8	(Germany) Joest Racing	(Germany) Frank Jelinski (Germany) "John Winter"	Porsche 962C	G	103
8	C1	8	(Germany) Joest Racing	(Germany) Frank Jelinski (Germany) "John Winter"	Porsche Type-935 3.0L Turbo Flat-6	G	103
9	C1	4	(Switzerland) Brun Motorsport	(Switzerland) Walter Brun (Italy) Massimo Sigala	Porsche 962C	M	103
9	C1	4	(Switzerland) Brun Motorsport	(Switzerland) Walter Brun (Italy) Massimo Sigala	Porsche Type-935 3.0L Turbo Flat-6	M	103
10	C2	107	(United Kingdom) Chamberlain Engineering	(France) Claude Ballot-Léna (France) Jean-Louis Ricci	Spice SE88C	A	103
10	C2	107	(United Kingdom) Chamberlain Engineering	(France) Claude Ballot-Léna (France) Jean-Louis Ricci	Ford Cosworth DFL 3.3L V8	A	103
11	C2	103	(United Kingdom) Spice Engineering	(Italy) Almo Coppelli (Denmark) Thorkild Thyrring	Spice SE88C	G	101
11	C2	103	(United Kingdom) Spice Engineering	(Italy) Almo Coppelli (Denmark) Thorkild Thyrring	Ford Cosworth DFL 3.3L V8	G	101
12	C2	127	(United Kingdom) Chamberlain Engineering	(South Africa) Graham Duxbury (United Kingdom) Nick Adams	Spice SE86C	A	100
12	C2	127	(United Kingdom) Chamberlain Engineering	(South Africa) Graham Duxbury (United Kingdom) Nick Adams	Hart 418T 1.8L Turbo I4	A	100
13	C2	106	(Italy) Kelmar Racing	(Italy) Pasquale Barberio (Italy) Vito Veninata	Tiga GC288	A	98
13	C2	106	(Italy) Kelmar Racing	(Italy) Pasquale Barberio (Italy) Vito Veninata	Ford Cosworth DFL 3.3L V8	A	98
14	C2	115	(United Kingdom) ADA Engineering	(United Kingdom) John Sheldon (United Kingdom) Dudley Wood	ADA 03	G	131
14	C2	115	(United Kingdom) ADA Engineering	(United Kingdom) John Sheldon (United Kingdom) Dudley Wood	Ford Cosworth DFL 3.3L V8	G	131
15	C1	40	(Switzerland) Swiss Team Salamin	(Morocco) Max Cohen-Olivar (Switzerland) Antoine Salamin	Porsche 962C	G	95
15	C1	40	(Switzerland) Swiss Team Salamin	(Morocco) Max Cohen-Olivar (Switzerland) Antoine Salamin	Porsche Type-935 3.0L Turbo Flat-6	G	95
16	C2	101	(Italy) Dollop Racing	(Italy) Nicola Marozzo (Switzerland) Jean-Pierre Frey	Argo JM19B	G	79
16	C2	101	(Italy) Dollop Racing	(Italy) Nicola Marozzo (Switzerland) Jean-Pierre Frey	Motori Moderni 2.0L Turbo V6	G	79
17	C2	117	(Norway) Team Lucky Strike Schanche	(Norway) Martin Schanche (United Kingdom) Will Hoy	Argo JM19C	G	78
17	C2	117	(Norway) Team Lucky Strike Schanche	(Norway) Martin Schanche (United Kingdom) Will Hoy	Ford Cosworth DFL 3.3L V8	G	78
18 DNF	C1	2	(United Kingdom) Silk Cut Jaguar	(Netherlands) Jan Lammers (United Kingdom) Johnny Dumfries	Jaguar XJR-9	D	96
18 DNF	C1	2	(United Kingdom) Silk Cut Jaguar	(Netherlands) Jan Lammers (United Kingdom) Johnny Dumfries	Jaguar 7.0L V12	D	96
19 DNF	C2	121	(United Kingdom) Cosmik GP Motorsport	(France) Philippe de Henning (Greece) Costas Los	Spice SE87C	G	89
19 DNF	C2	121	(United Kingdom) Cosmik GP Motorsport	(France) Philippe de Henning (Greece) Costas Los	Ford Cosworth DFL 3.3L V8	G	89
20 DNF	C1	7	(Germany) Joest Racing	(Germany) Klaus Ludwig (France) Bob Wollek	Porsche 962C	G	62
20 DNF	C1	7	(Germany) Joest Racing	(Germany) Klaus Ludwig (France) Bob Wollek	Porsche Type-935 3.0L Turbo Flat-6	G	62
21 DNF	C2	123	(United Kingdom) Charles Ivey Racing	(South Africa) Wayne Taylor (United Kingdom) Tim Harvey	Tiga GC287	D	45
21 DNF	C2	123	(United Kingdom) Charles Ivey Racing	(South Africa) Wayne Taylor (United Kingdom) Tim Harvey	Porsche Type-935 2.8L Turbo Flat-6	D	45
22 DNF	C2	109	(Italy) Kelmar Racing	(Italy) Ranieri Randaccio (Italy) Maurizio Gellini	Tiga GC85	A	32
22 DNF	C2	109	(Italy) Kelmar Racing	(Italy) Ranieri Randaccio (Italy) Maurizio Gellini	Ford Cosworth DFL 3.3L V8	A	32
23 DNF	C2	177	(France) Automobiles Louis Descartes	(France) Louis Descartes (France) Jacques Heuclin	ALD C2	A	30
23 DNF	C2	177	(France) Automobiles Louis Descartes	(France) Louis Descartes (France) Jacques Heuclin	BMW M80 3.5L I6	A	30
DNS	C1	14	(United Kingdom) Richard Lloyd Racing	(United Kingdom) James Weaver (United Kingdom) Derek Bell	Porsche 962C GTi	G	-
DNS	C1	14	(United Kingdom) Richard Lloyd Racing	(United Kingdom) James Weaver (United Kingdom) Derek Bell	Porsche Type-935 3.0L Turbo Flat-6	G	-

== Statistics ==
- Pole Position - #61 Jean-Louis Schlesser - 1:14.350
- Fastest Lap - #61 Jean-Louis Schlesser - 1:18.464
- Average Speed - 144.325 km/h

World Sportscar Championship
Previous race: 1988 800km of Jerez	1988 season	Next race: 1988 1000km of Monza
