= ADAC Supercup =

West German auto racing series

- Category: Sportscar
- Country: West Germany
- Inaugural season: 1986
- Folded: 1989

The Supercup was a West German auto racing series created by the ADAC in 1986 as a replacement for the Deutsche Rennsport Meisterschaft (DRM). The series used Group C category sports prototypes identical to the ones used in the World Sportscar Championship, yet running nearly exclusively within West Germany. The series lasted for four years before it was cancelled following the 1989 championship.

The series was initially sponsored by sport auto magazine during its inaugural season, then replaced by Würth the following two years. Television network Sat.1 sponsor the championship's final year.

== Format ==
The Supercup would employ a sprint format for all of its races, each race lasting approximately one hour although later events were extended to near an hour and a half. These short distances meant that unlike the endurance races seen in the World Championship, Supercup teams would not be required to change drivers during the course of an event. Each season consisted of five rounds, all held in West Germany with the exception of a Silverstone round in 1989. Popular circuits included the Nürburgring, Hockenheimring, Diepholz airfield, and the Norisring 200 Miles event.

The cars ran rules nearly identical to the FIA's Group C category, broken into C1 and C2 classes. The larger C1 class was dominated by both factory and customer Porsche 956s and 962Cs, as well as efforts from the Jaguar, Mercedes-Benz, and Nissan factory teams. C2 consisted of teams running engines limited in capacity to produce less power than the C1 cars but also weighed less. Although two classes ran, only a single championship was held.

== Champions ==
Championships for both drivers and teams were held over the four seasons. Joest Racing won three championships, with the factory Porsche team winning during their sole year of competition. Hans-Joachim Stuck won the drivers championship the first two years for Joest then Porsche. Jean-Louis Schlesser managed to nab the drivers championship in 1988 for Sauber-Mercedes although Joest retained the teams title. Bob Wollek returned the drivers championship to the team in 1989, to go along with their third team title.

Year	Drivers Champion	Teams Champion
1986	(Germany) Hans-Joachim Stuck	(Germany) Blaupunkt Joest Racing
1987	(Germany) Hans-Joachim Stuck	(Germany) Porsche AG
1988	(France) Jean-Louis Schlesser	(Germany) Blaupunkt Joest Racing
1989	(France) Bob Wollek	(Germany) Blaupunkt-Sachs Joest Racing

== Demise ==
The championship was cancelled following the 1989 season as manufacturers and teams chose to concentrate solely on the World Championship rather than risking equipment and drivers for a national series. Porsche withdrew immediately after their 1988 campaign, while Sauber left the series after failing to win the teams championship in 1988. Although fields of twenty cars were still seen in the final year, there was a lack of interest in a 1990 season, the series was folded.
