= Walter Maurer (artist) =

German artist and designer

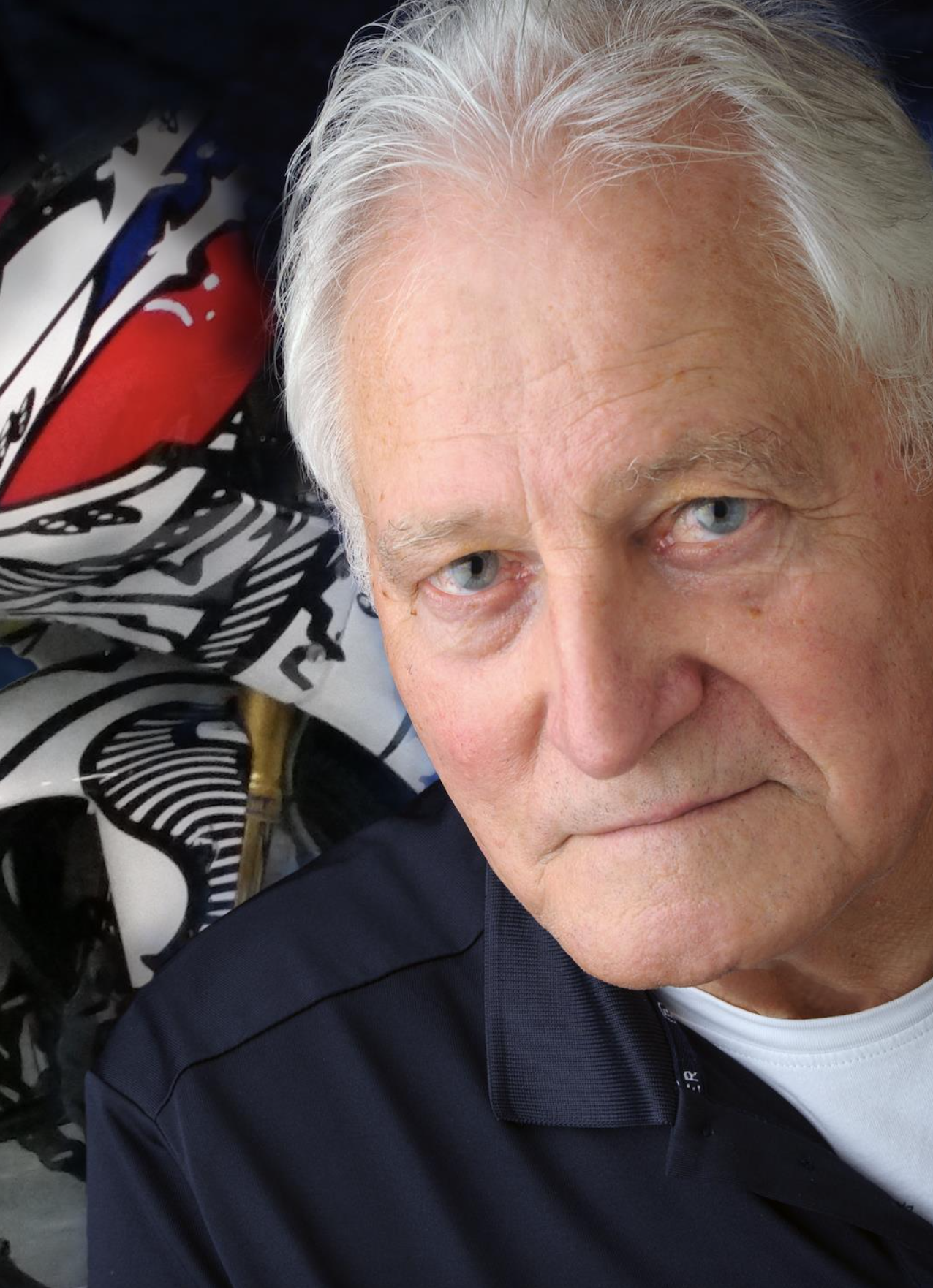
- Walter Maurer (2022)
- Born: 20 March 1942; Dachau, Bavaria, Germany
- Education: Studies of graphic design and colour theory
- Known for: Painting, designing, modern art
- Notable work: Für den Frieden. (For Peace.), Come Together, Dialog
- Movement: Cubism, expressionism
- Awards: Badge of Honour of the Bundeswehr

Walter Helmut Maurer (born March 20, 1942, in Dachau, Bavaria, Germany) is a German designer and artist.

Maurer is best known for having painted many of the cars in the BMW Art Car series.

== Biography ==
=== Early life and beginnings ===
Walter Maurer was born on 20 March 1942 in Dachau as son of a soldier and a housewife. After attending school, he decided to train as an illustration technician and subsequently studied graphic design in Munich.

During his childhood he experienced the last phase of World War II and the later reconstruction of the new Federal Republic of Germany. The senseless war and the pain over the early loss of his father were partly the catalyst for Walter Maurer's strong moral compass and later extensive artistic commitment advocating peaceful coexistence without hatred, exclusion or discrimination.

=== Life and career ===
During his studies in Munich, Walter Maurer launched his own business as a designer and painter at the beginning of the 1960s. After Maurer mainly did advertising and design paintwork for medium-sized and large transport companies and breweries and also designed logos during this time, his clientele expanded and he started to attract greater attention.

At the beginning of the 1970s, Walter Maurer also caught the interest of the German car brand BMW, which invited him to collaborate as a co-artist on BMW Art Car projects and later as a designer.

Besides his professional activities as a designer and artist, Walter Maurer also lectured on colour theory at the Academy of Fine Arts in Munich from 1991 to 2001. From 1984 to 2002, Walter Maurer was also academic director at the Glasurit School of Design of the BASF Group.

From the 1980s until the late 1990s, he also gained notoriety outside artistic circles in the motorsport scene, when he successfully competed with his BMW M1 ProCar (Group C) at international races.

=== Artistic work ===
Walter Maurer's artistic work is extensive and closely linked to the automotive and aviation world as well as committed to ethical issues and philosophically complex questions about humanity and contemporary issues.

==== BMW Art Cars ====
In the early 1970s, on the initiative of Hervé Poulain, Walter Maurer began collaborating with various international artists, which later led to the legendary BMW Art Cars. As co-artist, Walter Maurer played a major role in the creation of the BMW Art Cars by Alexander Calder (1975), Frank Stella (1976), Roy Lichtenstein (1977), Andy Warhol (1979), Ernst Fuchs (1982) and César Manrique (1990).

He also contributed to various other BMW Art Car projects and, for example, developed and applied a special coat for Cao Fei's 3D Art Car, which made it possible for the light art to be displayed on the vehicle.

In 2020, Walter Maurer also created the Artist's proof of the Art Car realised with Alexander Calder in 1975. Back in 1975, Alexander Calder and Walter Maurer were already considering the possibility of creating a second Art Car of the same design, which Calder would have liked to keep in his private collection. Due to Calder's untimely death in 1976, however, these plans could not be completed and were no longer pursued. In 2019, the Alexander Calder Foundation, headed by Alexander S. C. Rower, Alexander Calder's grandson, had the opportunity to acquire an identical model of the BMW 3.0 CSL and restore it with the aim of fulfilling the wish of his grandfather Alexander Calder and adding an Artist's Proof of the first BMW Art Car to the Foundation's collection. The Alexander Calder Foundation counted on the administrative support of BMW AG, which was as committed to the project as all the others involved. A prerequisite for Rower was that the Artist's Proof should also be carried out by Walter Maurer, who had also been responsible for the execution of the design paintwork in 1975 and who, as the last living artist of the 1975 project, could contribute his wealth of experience in the best possible way.

==== Maurer/Lagerfeld BMW L7 Individual ====
In 1999, BMW Group came to the wish of having a BMW L7 designed jointly by two renowned artists and submitted the project proposal to Karl Lagerfeld and Walter Maurer. Maurer and Lagerfeld agreed and then set to work together, the result of which was presented in Paris in 2000. Walter Maurer was responsible for the exterior design of the car, while Karl Lagerfeld designed the interior. The interior is dominated by brown leather and burl wood in the style of the early 2000s. On the outside, Walter Maurer's design is characterised by a two-tone variant that combines the colours orange and brown in a soft gradient.

==== Come Together ====
With his art series called Come Together, Walter Maurer sends a statement against racism, injustice and aggression and calls for peaceful coexistence and collaboration. His artworks in the Come Together series include small, medium and large-scale paintings as well as automotive sculptures. The paintings and sculptures are regularly exhibited worldwide and are also used by companies, foundations and public authorities to strengthen their ethical image.

The German Air Force commissioned Walter Maurer threefold to paint three aircraft, two Bell UH-1D and a Transall C-160, with designs from the Come Together series under the theme "For Peace" in order to highlight the importance of the German Armed Forces as an army of peacekeeping. The German miniature model manufacturer Herpa also produced a 1:2000 miniature edition of the Für den Frieden Transall C-160, licensed by Walter Maurer.

==== Dialog ====
Similar to the works in the Come Together series, the artworks belonging to the Dialog series also place a high value on stimulating a discourse on ethical issues. Characteristic of the Dialog series are two abstract faces standing opposite but facing each other. The observer is invited to reflect on the meaning of human communication and the importance of understanding people as human beings with ideas and identity.
