= Survive To Fight =

Publication concerning protective equipment

Survive To Fight is the title of a British Army publication which details the use of NBC protective equipment and other procedures to be carried in the event of an attack with nuclear, biological or chemical weapons. So far five editions have been published (and two reprint runs); the first three of which are in the form of a ring-bound manual with a plastic cover, and the last, Edition 5, is an 82-page loose leaf TAM insert (6 hole ringbinder). Edition I (AC71388) covers the use of the S6 Respirator and Mk.III NBC suit and overboots, Edition II (1990) (reprinted in 1992 with colour photographs on cover) featuring the S10 Respirator and Mk.IV suit and overboots which were introduced since. Edition III with different colour photographs on cover (1995) (reprinted once with glue bound at the top (circa 1998)) is a revised version of II, and features the addition of the Mk.V overboots. Edition IV (Jan 2002) is a TAM sided bound booklet. The last edition carrying the title 'Survive to Fight' was issued in September 2005 (edition 5), though this carried Army Code 64358 (not a JSP).

The title of the publication was changed to JSP926 'Counter CBRN Aide Memoire' in July 2012 to reflect different operating conditions, this booklet is in the same loose leaf TAM insert format. The publication continues in this TAM sized form and can also be downloaded for use on a phone or laptop.

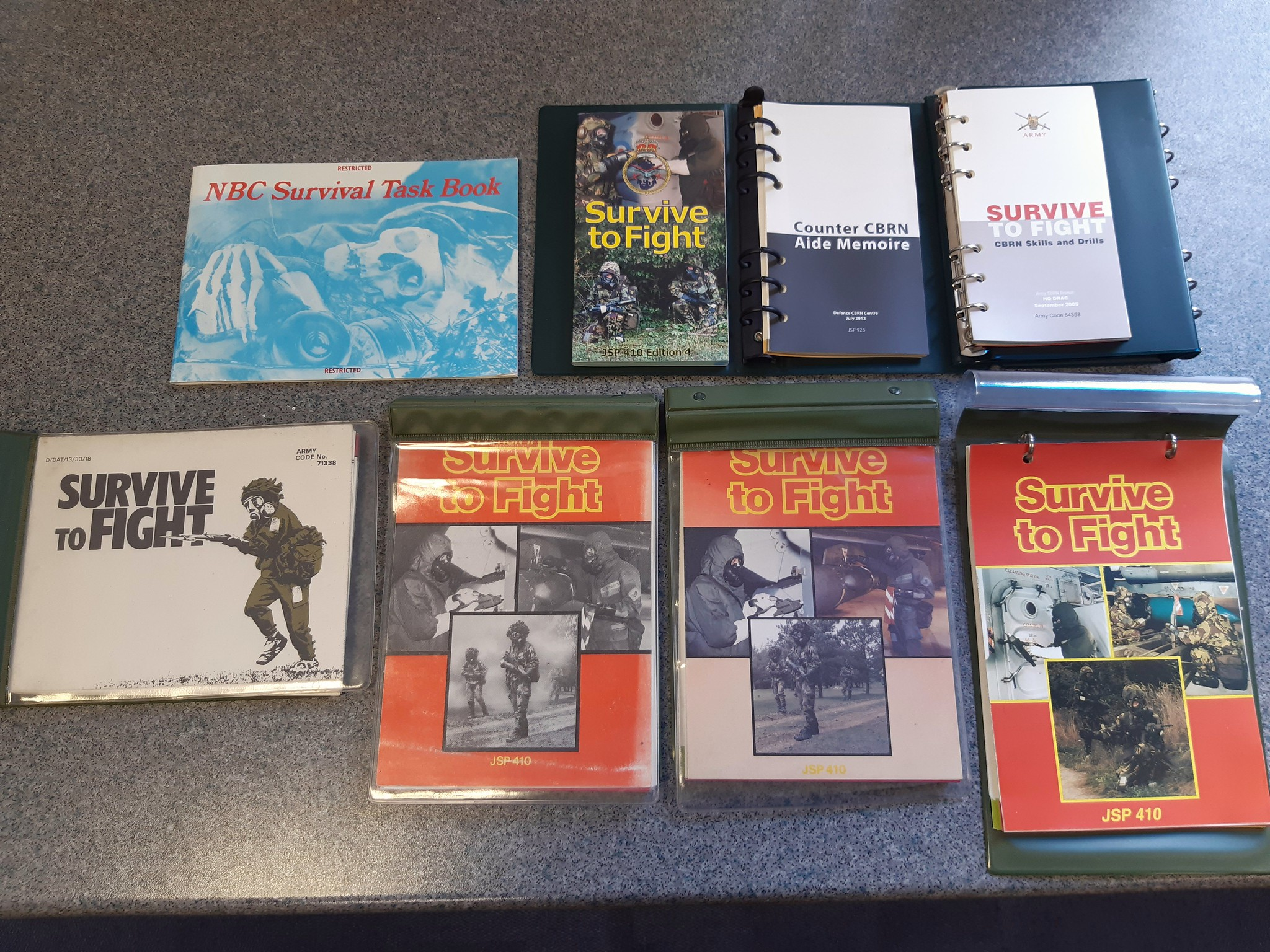
Survive to Fight covers for all edition published

== See also ==
- Basic Battle Skills
- Battlefield First Aid
- All-In Fighting
