= General Service Respirator =

British gas mask

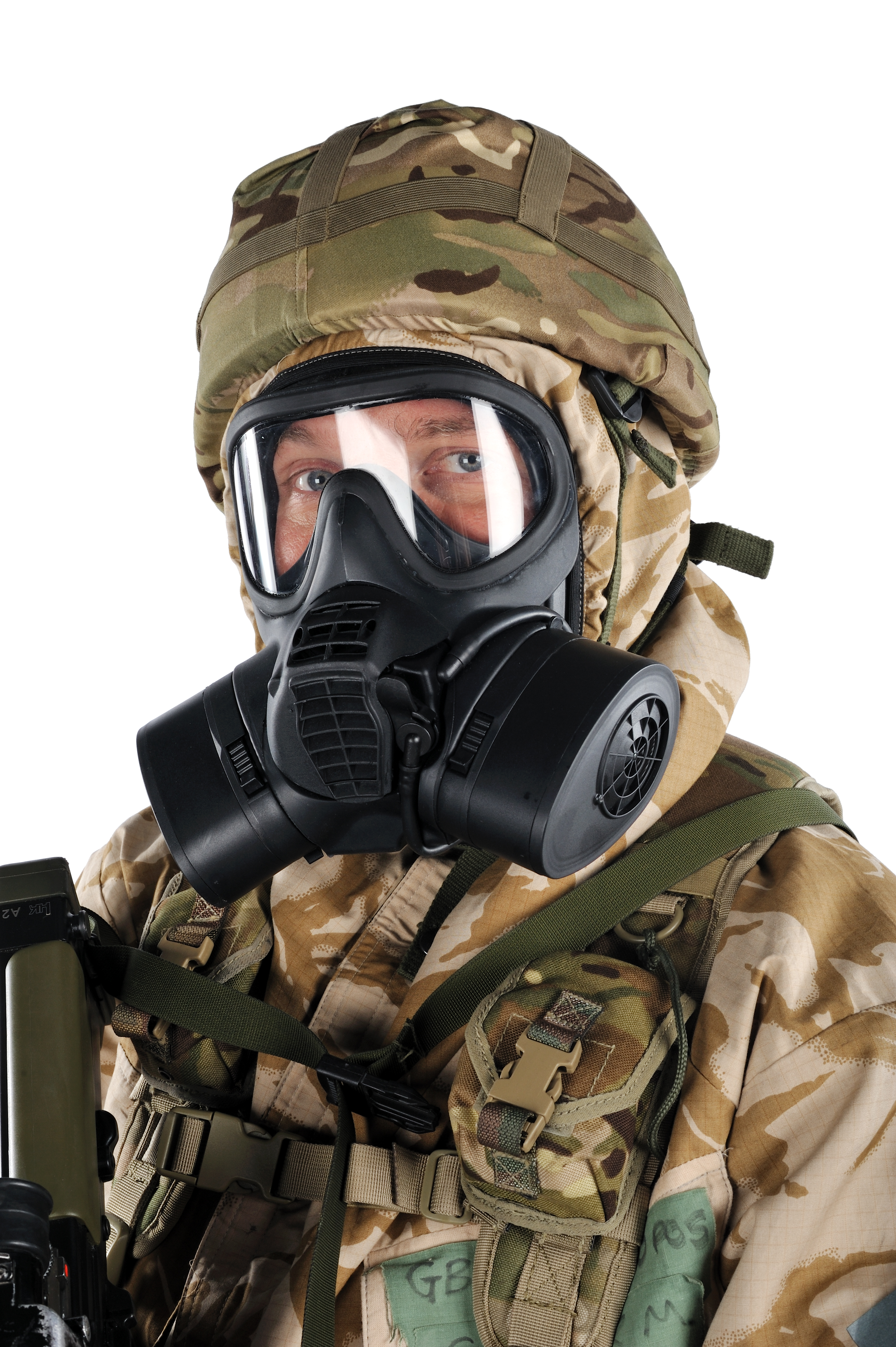
- British soldier with the GSR
- Type: Gas mask
- Place of origin: United Kingdom

Service history
- In service: 2010-present
- Used by: British military

Production history
- Designer: Defence Science and Technology Laboratory; Ministry of Defence
- Designed: 2000-2009
- Manufacturer: Scott Safety
- Produced: 2010-present

The General Service Respirator (GSR) is a military gas mask designed to replace the previous S10 respirator for the British Armed Forces. It was designed by the Defence Science and Technology Laboratory and Scott Safety in collaboration with the Ministry of Defence, and was manufactured by Scott Safety. Avon Protection now manufactures the GSR from its factory in Melksham after winning the in-service support contract in 2019.

British gas masks from mid 1920s to 1960s were also known as General Service Respirator.

== History ==
Design work started in 2000, and from the outset the GSR was designed to function better than the S10 in "hot, high and dry" environments whilst still keeping the S10's qualities in the temperate environments of Europe for which it was originally intended. It was also designed to be worn for longer periods than the S10, having been designed for 24 hours of continuous use in chemical, biological, radiological and nuclear defence (CBRN) environments as opposed to the previous design level of 4 hours.

The respirator was officially adopted into service with the Armed Forces on 26 August 2010, and training started during 2011, with British Forces Germany being the first to field them. All new personnel are trained in use of the system. Existing personnel will be trained through refresher courses, starting with the British Army, and continuing with the Royal Navy, Royal Air Force and the Royal Fleet Auxiliary. By January 2015, all 300,000+ respirators had been delivered to the British Armed Forces.

== Features ==
The new respirator, produced by Scott Health and Safety Ltd, reportedly provides a significantly higher level of protection. Features which differentiate it from the S10 which it replaced are:

- Twin filter canisters (can be changed more easily while in a CBRN environment)
- Single visor (better visibility and reduces the claustrophobic effect)
- Improved drinking system (water can be passed through the system at a higher rate)
- Ability to convert to EU standard canisters with a simple modification
