= XM28 Grasshopper gas mask =

Tunnel rat gas mask

- Type: Gas mask
- Place of origin: United States

Service history
- In service: 1968-1976

Production history
- Designed: 1966
- Manufacturer: Mine Safety Appliances

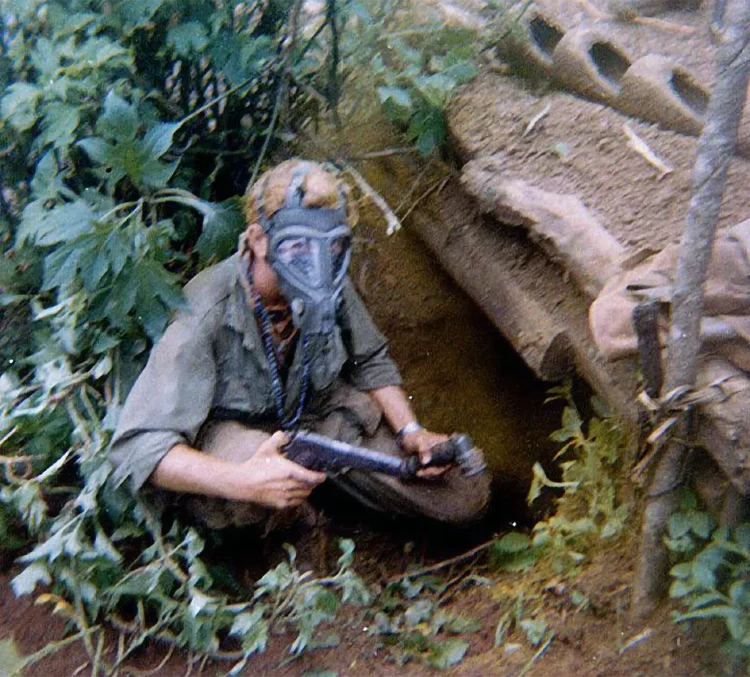
US tunnel rat wearing the XM28E4 "grasshopper" gas mask during the Vietnam War.

The XM28E4 Riot Control Agent Mask, colloquially known as the "Grasshopper" for its profile, was an American experimental gas mask designed for use by tunnel rats deploying tear gas in the Viet Cong tunnels during the Vietnam War.

== History ==
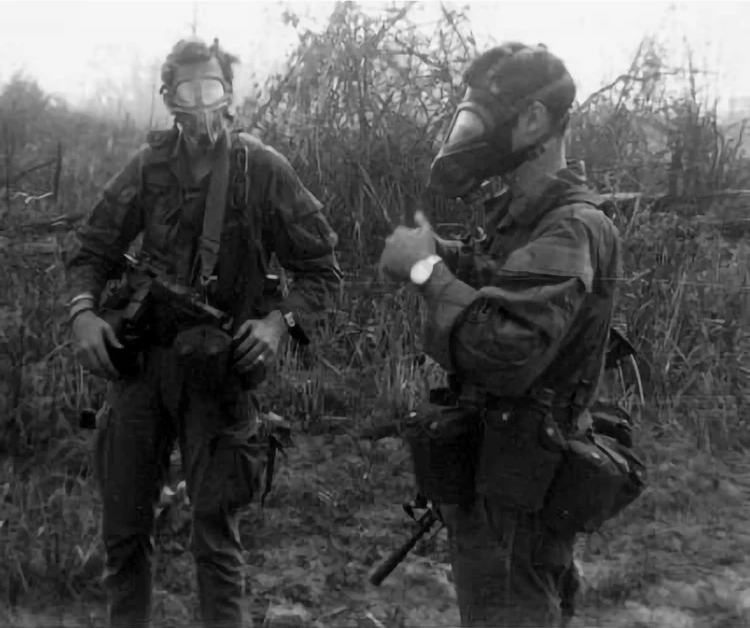
US soldiers wearing the XM28E4 "grasshopper" gas mask during the Vietnam War.

During the Vietnam War, the existing US Army M17 gas mask proved too bulky for the tunnel warfare conducted by tunnel rats. Such involved the use of tear gas to flush out enemies, forcing the need for protective equipment. This led to the development of a dedicated gas mask for tunnel rat operations, leading to the XM28 with its slim design. Development started in 1966, and after 4 revisions, the XM28E4 was introduced in 1968.

Soldiers from the 1st Cavalry and 1st Infantry Divisions tested the new masks in 1967. MACV-SOG team used them on their STABO or M56 harness due to frequent use of CS gas during field missions. Various police forces in the US also acquired the mask as surplus.

By 1976, the XM28 was declared obsolete.

== Design ==
Its internal cheek filters and low profile made it extremely light and compact.

== Variants ==
- XM27 - Similar to M17, except that its face piece was made of silicone rubber. This made the gas mask foldable.
- XM28 - New mask made of silicone rubber with cheek pocket filters.
