= FM12 =

FM12 may refer to:

- Football Manager 2012, a video game
- Volvo FM12, a heavy truck
- FM12 NBC Respirator, a gas mask
