= Scott Air-Pak SCBA =

Firefighting breathing apparatus

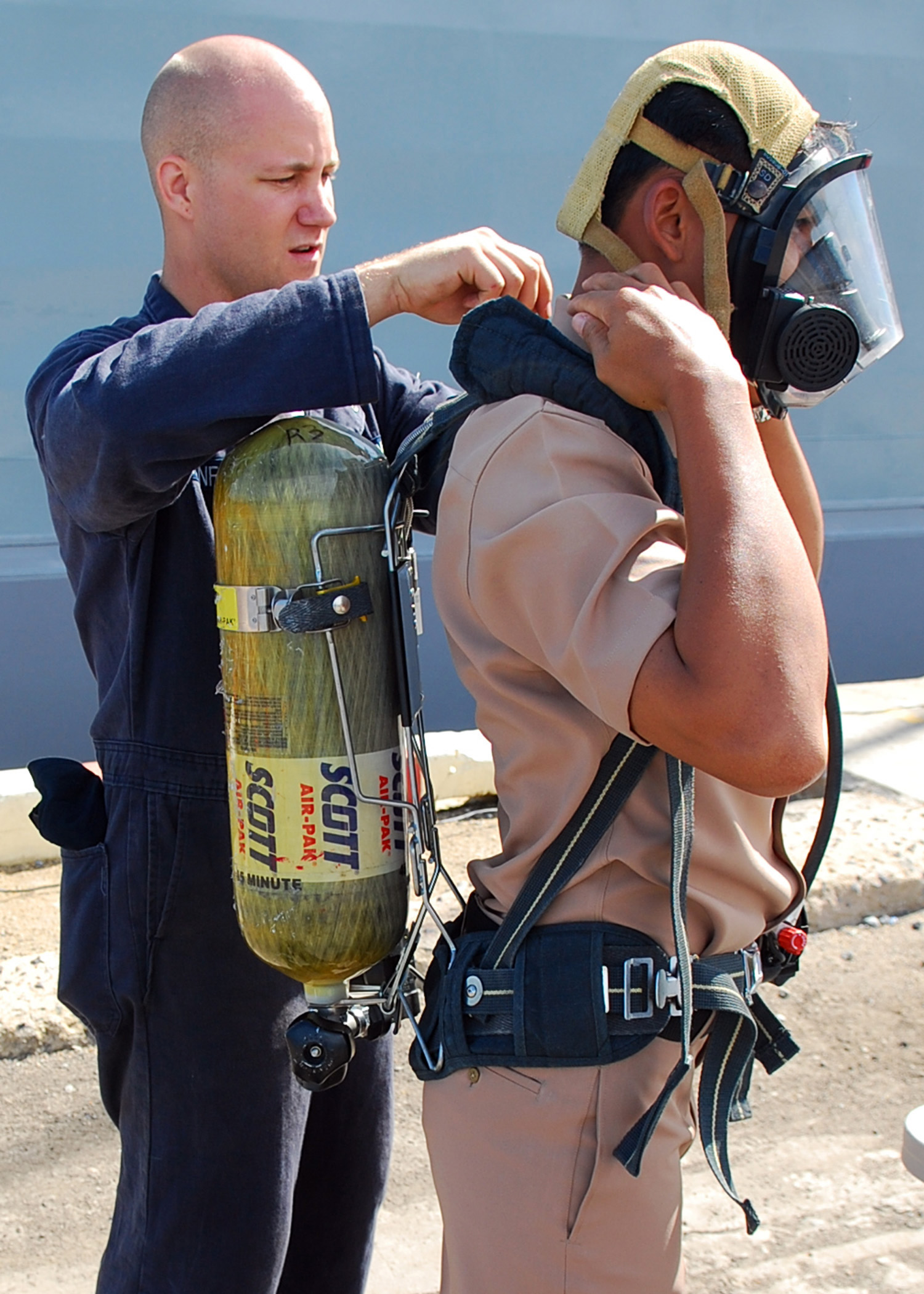
A Royal Thai Navy sailor dons a self-contained breathing apparatus.

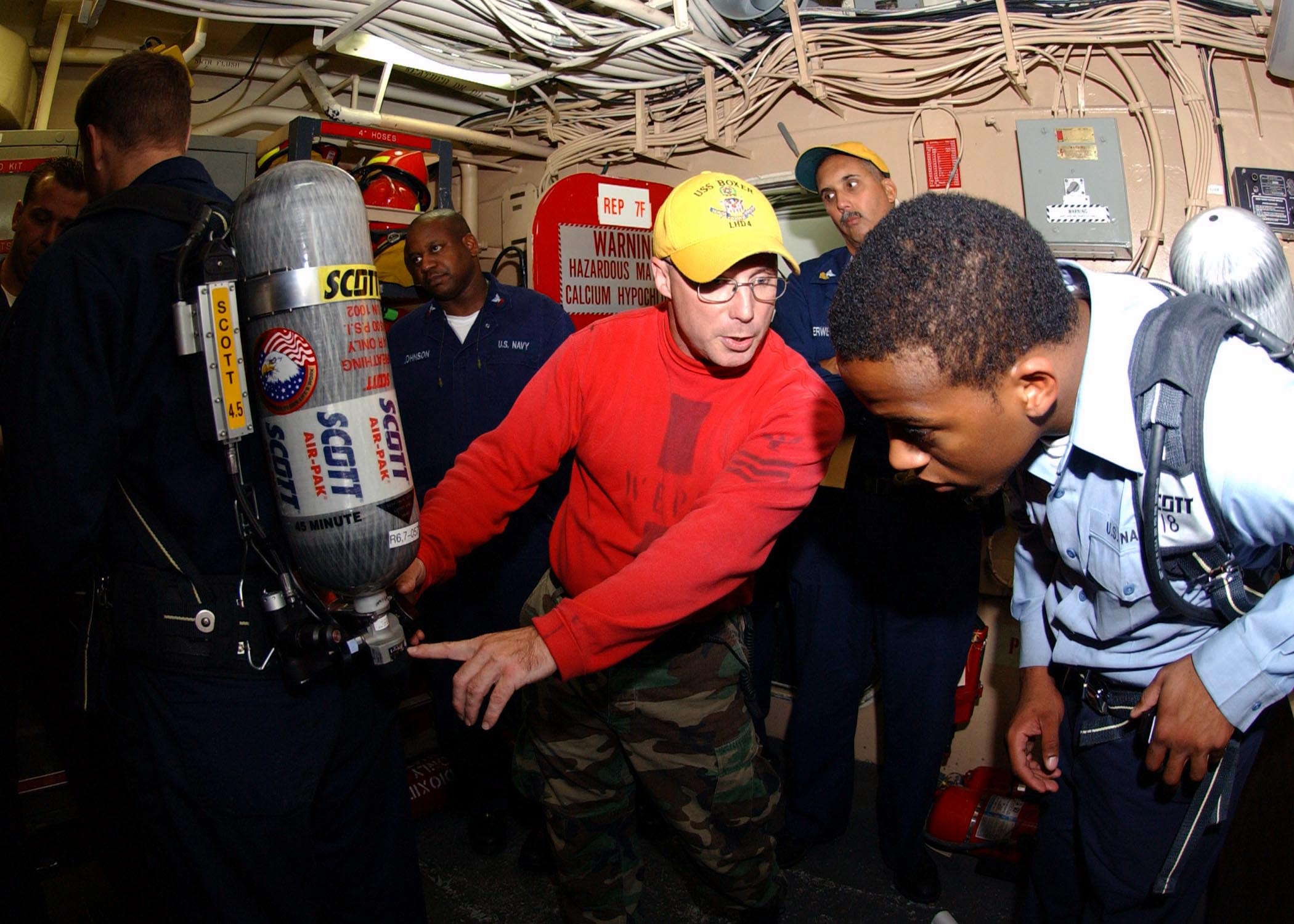
Aviation Ordnanceman explains how to use the Self Contained Breathing Apparatus (SCBA).

The Scott Air-Pak SCBA is an open-circuit, self-contained breathing apparatus designed to meet the National Fire Protection Association (NFPA) Standard 1981. All components, excluding the air cylinder, were designed and manufactured by Scott Safety. Formerly a division of Tyco International, Ltd., Scott Safety was sold to 3M in 2017.

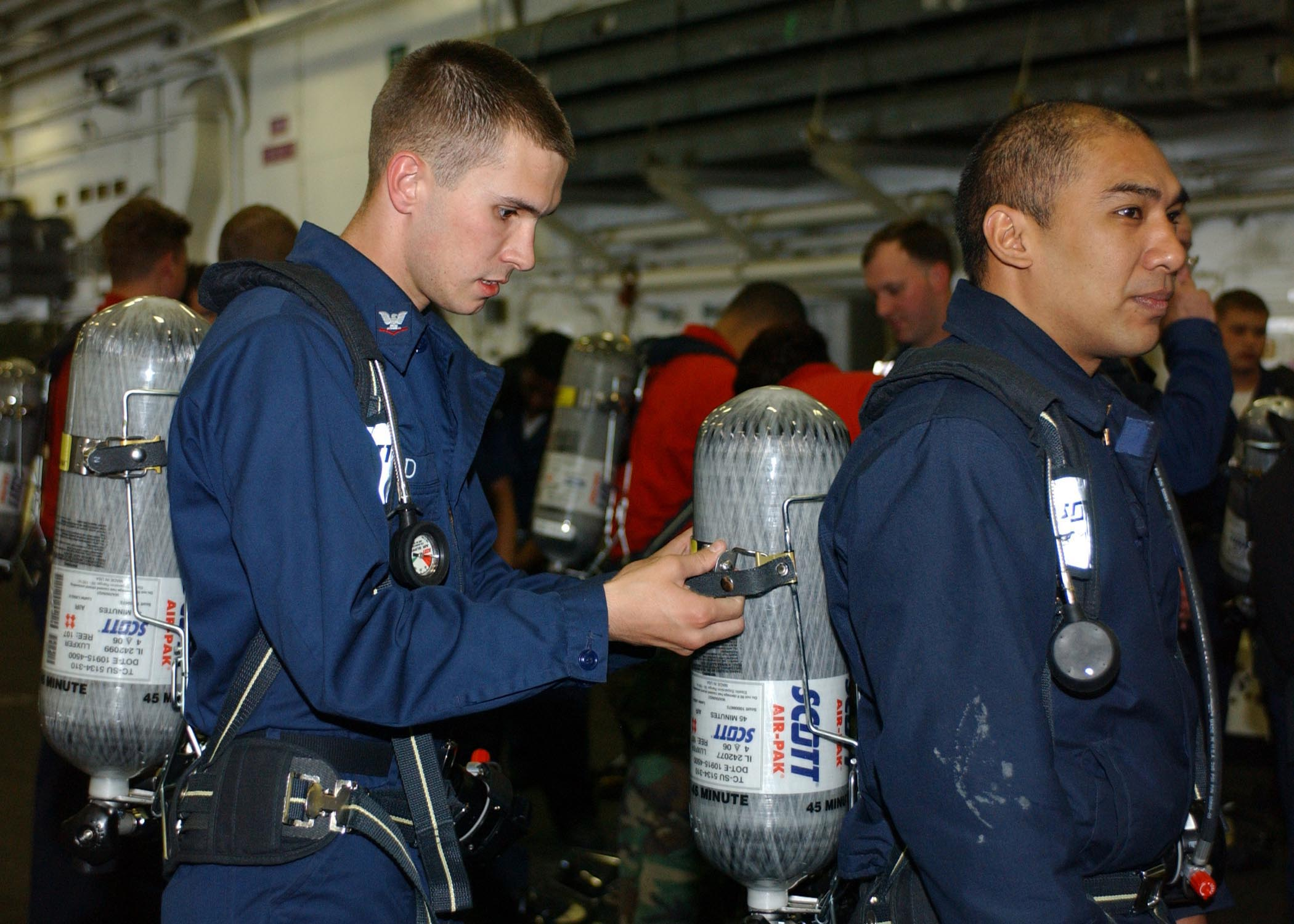
Electronics Technician checks a Self Contained Breathing Apparatus (SCBA) for proper operation.

== 30 minute Cylinder specifications ==
Other sizes sold are 45, 60 & 75 minute cylinders.

The cylinder and valve assembly is used for storing breathable air under pressure.

- Dimensions:

a. Cylinder = 19.6” × 5”
b. Water capacity = 285 cubic inches
c. Air capacity = 45 cubic feet (1,280 L) for a 30-minute air supply (1274 liters)
d. Weight = 11 pounds (5.0 kg)
e. Weight with AP-50 = 23.7 pounds (10.8 kg)

== Testing/burst hazards (Data for 4500 cylinders, 5500 cylinders also exist) ==
The burst pressure for the tri-dimensional burst disk used in the Scott is 4800 psi. Carbon composite cylinders are made up of an aluminum alloy inner shell with carbon composite wraps and epoxy resin. They have a burst pressure of 12,000 psi, 6,500 without the carbon composite wrap.

== Valve assembly ==
The valve assembly is the appliance which will make the connection between the cylinder and the hose (which will send the air to a pressure reducer). It is constructed of forged aluminum alloy, and is angled to reduce stress of the connection made between the high-pressure female coupling of the high pressure hose. Newer cylinders contain a "tri lobe, ergonomically designed hand wheel." This hand wheel is a one-way, ratcheting type knob which is a push to close style knob. This protects the user from unwanted accidental shutoff during use.

There is also "an upstream connected frangible disc safety relief device" located on the valve assembly which is also known as the "tri-dimensional burst disk". This burst disk protects the user against a situation where the pressure in the bottle would increase with exposure to heat during a fire. It prevents unwanted failures somewhere else in the bottle. It is set to release at 7200 psi, or 400 °F. It is "tri-dimensional" in that, if it is activated, it would disperse the air from the bottle in three directions so as not to throw the user off his or her balance.
The high pressure male coupling, included in high pressure bottle connections, is set to meet the Compressed Gas Association Standards #346 and #347.
Also included in the assembly are the dual-sided pressure gauge (which reads the cylinder pressure directly from the cylinder), elastomeric bumper (a protective, rubber like stop), and hangar plate (for positive locking attachment of the assembly to the backframe).

== Effect of temperature on pressure gauge readings ==
The pressure gauge's indicated gas pressure changes with ambient temperature. As temperature decreases, the pressure inside the cylinder decreases. The relationship between the temperature and the pressure of a gas is determined by using the formula PV = nRT. What is particularly important to understand from the formula is that the temperature is in kelvins, not degrees Fahrenheit. Consider the freezing point of water at 32 degrees Fahrenheit (0 degrees Celsius) and compare it to 96 °F (35.6 °C; normal human body temperature is 37 °C). While 96 is arithmetically three times 32, the difference in temperature from a scientific point of view is not threefold. Instead of comparing 32 to 96, temperatures of 273.15 K and 308.71 K should be compared. The actual scientifically valid change in temperature from 32 to 96 °F is by a factor of 1.13 (308.71/273.15), not 3. If an air cylinder is pressurized to 4,500 psi at 96 °F and later the temperature drops to 32 °F, the pressure gauge will indicate 4,000 psi (4,500/1.13). Stated differently, a drop in temperature of 10 degrees Fahrenheit causes a pressure decrease of about 82 psi.
