= Basic Battle Skills =

British Army field training manual

- Author: British Army
- Subject: Military Training
- Genre: Military Training Manual
- Publisher: HMSO
- Publication date: 1977
- Pages: 70

Basic Battle Skills is a field training manual formerly issued to individual soldiers in the British Army.

Editions were modified over a period of approximately 25 years before the book was withdrawn from issue.

== Format ==
The manual was divided into seven chapters, each one an illustrated set of instructions on how to carry out the most basic subjects taught to soldiers during their first weeks of training.

Contents page of the initial 1977 edition.

- Individual Fieldcraft and Minor Tactics
- Map Reading
- Basic First aid
- Health and Hygiene
- NBC Defence
- administration and morale
- Physical Fitness

The opening chapter Individual Fieldcraft and Minor Tactics starts with the information: A sound knowledge of Fieldcraft and Minor Tactics will help you in combat to:

- Fight
- Live
- Protect yourself and your equipment
- Remain fit
- Be an asset to your commander

In the first chapter the manual describes in more detail the skills needed in Fieldcraft and Minor Tactics. Commencing with "Judging Distance" and describing methods on how to ascertain how far a subject is from the soldier up to ranges of 400 metres and recommending that weapon sights be carefully adjusted for accuracy. The chapter also gives guidance on "Personal Camouflage", "Target Recognition", "Fire Control Orders", "Movement in the field", "Movement at night", "Night Noises", "Night vision", "Sentry duties", "Sentries at night in the field", "Rifle section formations", "Field signals (on foot)", "Advancing towards the enemy", "Weapon handling", "Ammunition" and "Trenches".

== Illustrations ==
Illustration gives instruction complementing the wording of the page.

The book contains simple illustrations with vivid colours detailing in pictures what the wording of each section instructs a soldier to do in various situations. For example: in chapter one instructions are provided on the method and wording to be used when challenging movement of persons approaching the sentry position. The manual instructs the sentry to call out, "Halt, who goes there? Advance one and be recognised." When approached in response to this command the sentry is instructed to use the "challenge" part of the password and to expect the correct reply before allowing any further movement of the person(s) approaching his position. The password will have previously been set by the officers in command and have been made known to every soldier within the formation. It will take the form of two simple words, for example: the challenge part could be "sausages" and the reply "chips". Therefore, the sentry calls out "sausages" and expects the reply "chips". If the correct reply is not received the sentry would be expected to open fire on the enemy approaching as anyone without the password is to be treated as an enemy.

The illustration to the right shows in words and pictures how a sentry should perform his duties in the event of requiring to challenge a person or persons who approach him.

== Other British Military instructional manuals ==
The British Army publishes many booklets and manuals to assist soldiers in remembering the lessons of training. These have included:

- Staff Duties in the Field - provides a guide for officers and soldiers in operational "staff work" for staff and regimental officers. A concise pocket version is also supplied for use in the field.
- Bayonet Battle Training
- Dress Regulations for the Army
- Booby Traps
- Shoot to Kill

== See also ==
- Survive To Fight
- All-In Fighting
- British Army
- Selection and Training in the British Army
- History of the British Army
