= M50 Joint Service General Purpose Mask =

Gas mask used by the US military

- A M50 Protective mask with attached filters
- Type: Protective mask
- Place of origin: United Kingdom and United States

Service history
- In service: 2006–present
- Used by: See Users

Production history
- Manufacturer: Avon Technologies
- Produced: 2006–present

Specifications
- Weight: 1.9 lbs (M50)

The M50 series protective mask, officially known as the Joint Service General Purpose Mask (JSGPM or JSGPM/M50), is a lightweight, protective mask system consisting of the mask, a mask carrier, and additional accessories. It was adopted by the U.S. military in 2006 and is manufactured by Avon Rubber, the rubber-producing department of Avon Protection. There are two variants, the M50, for ground and shipboard use, and the M51, for ground vehicle use.

The mask was designed to incorporate state-of-the-art technology to protect soldiers from current and anticipated threats from all types of weapons of mass destruction. It is an above-the-neck, chemical-biological (CB) respirator that protects against battlefield concentrations of CB agents, toxins, toxic industrial materials, and radioactive particulate matter.

The M50/51 masks replace the M40 field protective mask and M42, the MCU-2/P series masks, and the M45 of the Land Warrior Program.

== History ==
The M50 series mask entered service in December 2006. In July 2014, Avon Protection received a contract to supply 135,000 M50s for $33 million. In March 2016, it was announced that 166,623 M50s were purchased by the Department of Defense (DOD) under a $42 million contract.

== Design ==
The M50 series is certified to MIL-SPEC PRF-EA-10003. The mask design features improved performance against chemical and biological agents, toxic industrial chemicals, and nuclear fallout. The dual, low profile filters reduce weight and bulk while reducing breathing resistance by fifty percent over the M40 series mask. The filters incorporate a shelf-life indicator patch which changes colors from white to blue when the filters are no longer serviceable. The mask face blank incorporates self-sealing filter mounts that allow for filter changes in a contaminated environment.

The single-element eye lens gives the mask a 96 degree field of view and improved compatibility with military equipment and battlefield optical systems. The drinking system allows for greater liquid flow; however, it is not compatible with previous drinking systems and so is issued with an M50 series compatible canteen cap.

The lifetime ownership cost of the mask was reduced by 50% when compared with the M40 series mask due to a lower repair part count, all maintenance being completed at the operator and unit level and color coding of repair parts which decreased on-hand repair part inventory.

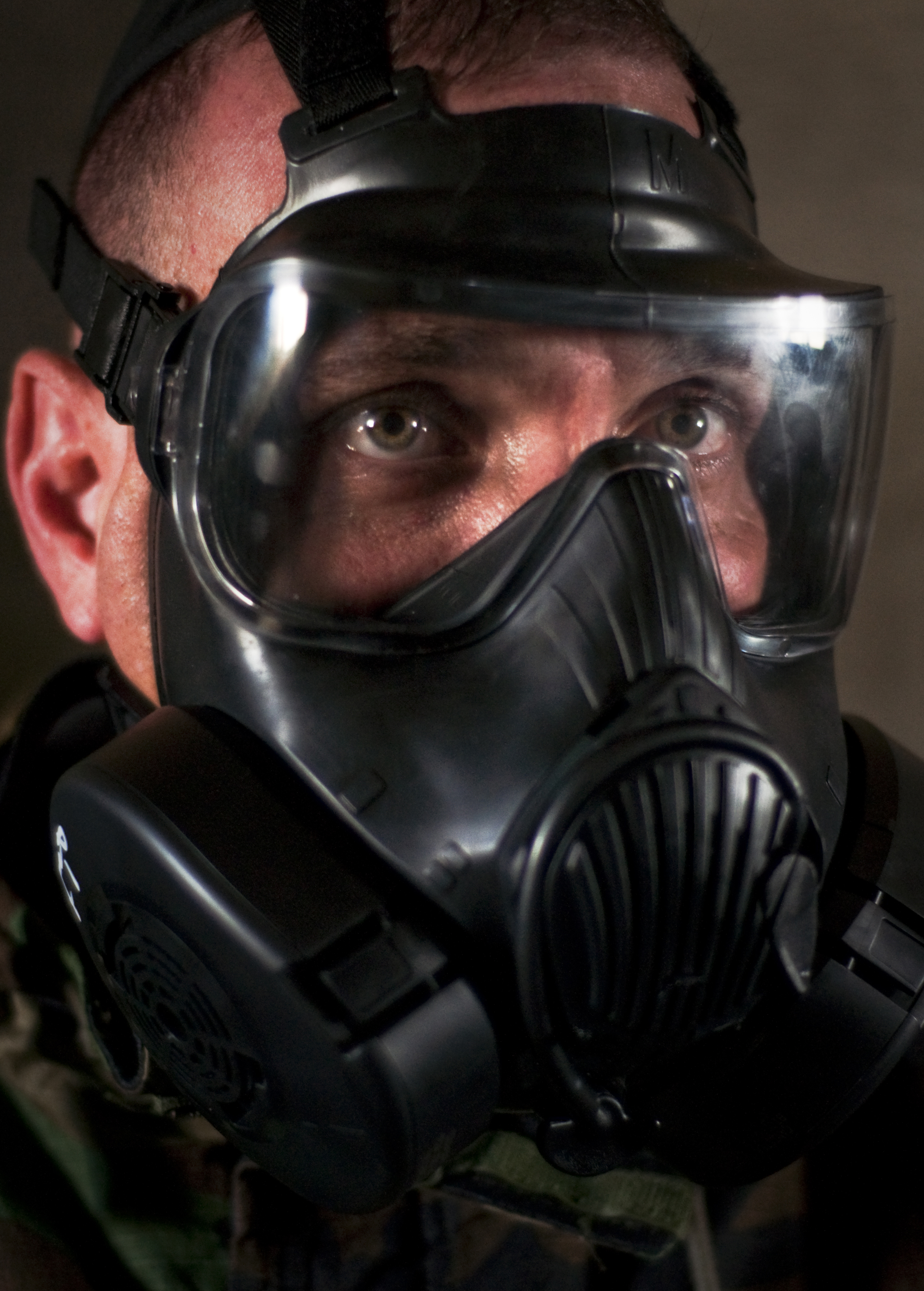
United States Marine Corps member is wearing a M50 mask

=== Variants ===
FM - Foreign Military Export (civilian market sales will have this designator)

- M50: Gas mask made to replace existing gas masks in use by the US military.
- M51: Consisting of a M50 gas mask with a CVC hood for head/neck protection and a flexible pipe to connect to combat vehicle overpressure systems.
- C50: 40mm NATO STANAG threaded version to use standard and conformal filters, primarily sold to police and export markets.
- M53/FM53: This series gas mask is based on the M50 and specifically developed to meet the unique requirements of Special Operations Forces (SOF) operators.
- M53A1: Improved single filter port variant of the M53.
- M54/FM54: Current generation dual 40mm ports on all models, Improved fire and chemical resistance same overall build to the M53.

== Users ==
- Belgium: Adopted by the Belgian Army.
- Finland: Adopted by the Finnish Army.
- Iraq: Used by Iraqi special forces under Counter-Terrorism Service.
- Netherlands: Awarded contract in January 2021 for the Dutch Army.
- Norway: Adopted by the Norwegian Armed Forces.
- Philippines: In service with the Philippine Army and Philippine Navy.
- Ukraine: Donated to Ukraine by Luxembourg in response to the Russian invasion of Ukraine.
- United States: In service with all branches of the U.S. military.
