= FM12 NBC Respirator =

Gas mask used by the British military

FM12 CBRN Respirator
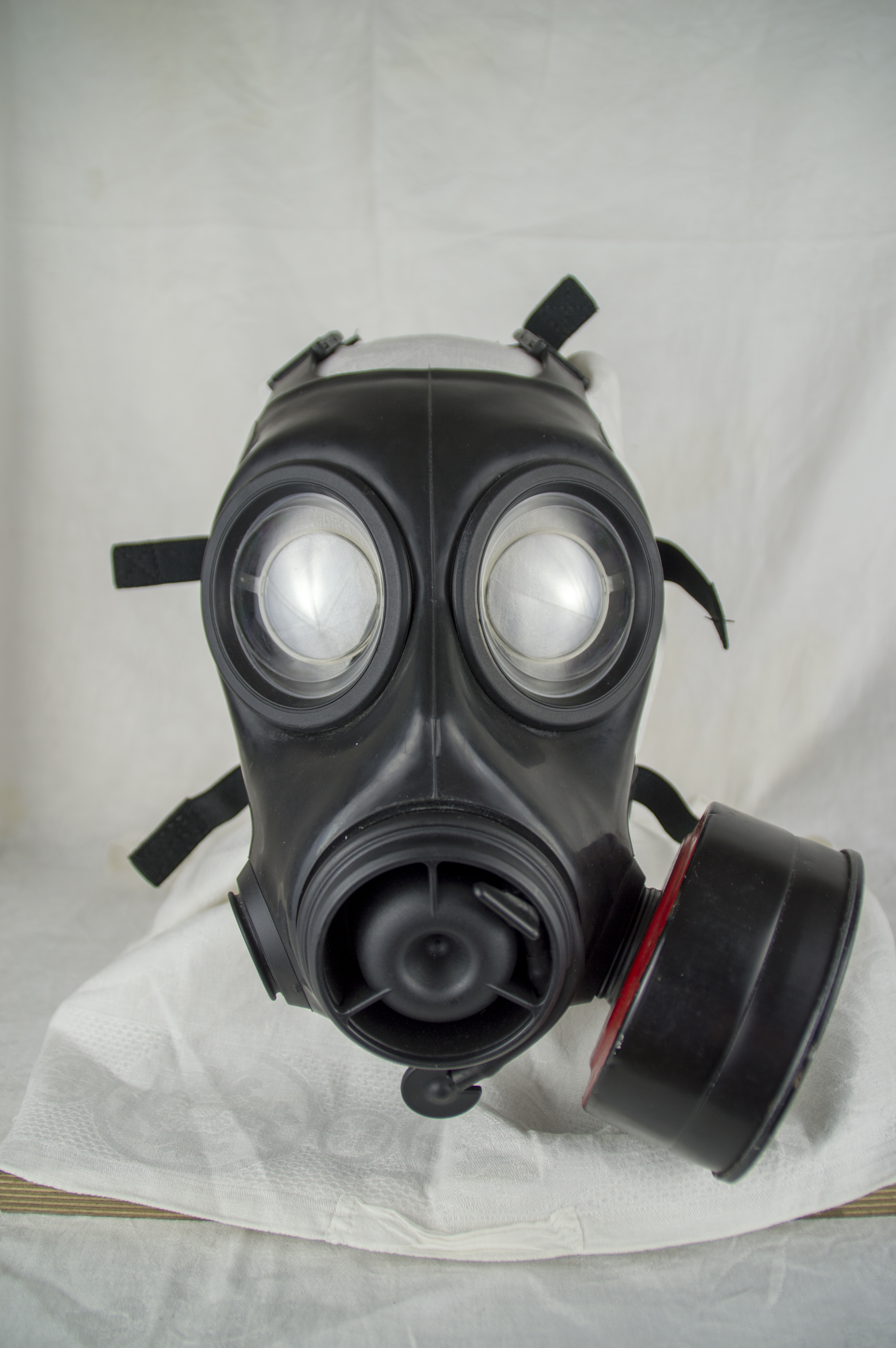
- Danish Issue M/93 with corrective monocles
- Type: Gas mask
- Place of origin: United Kingdom

Service history
- In service: 1997–present
- Used by: See Users

Production history
- Manufacturer: Avon
- Variants: See Variants

The FM12 CBRN Respirator is a military gas mask produced by Avon Rubber.

== History ==
The FM12 was introduced in 2000 as an intended replacement for the standard issue S10 NBC Respirator in service from the 1980s. However, the FM12 was never widely adopted by the military as it was deemed too similar to the S10 to warrant total replacement of all existing S10s.

== Characteristics ==
Two filter canisters are issued for the FM12, as with the S10; a light pressed metal type for riot control situations or training (marked with a painted red stripe or red tape), and a heavier plastic-encased type for protection against CBRN agents. The latter have a maximum shelf-life of 10 years, and the mask itself (the facepiece) of 20 years. The mask was designed around the S10, but has several design differences. The characteristics it shares in common with the S10 are the fail-safe drinking device, two speech transmitters (one primary integrated in the exhale valve at the front, another secondary at the side port for telephone communications), and the ability to accept corrective lenses on the inside of the eyepiece.

However, the voice emitter and exhale valve cover is smaller than that of the S10, as are the lenses. The FM12 has an overall lower profile than the S10 and sits closer to the wearer's face. The FM12's drinking tube is also longer than that of the S10, making drinking easier while wearing the mask. The FM12 also has an inner mask to prevent fogging of the lenses. The 'ridge' present around the edge of the S10 is absent from the FM12.

The main noticeable difference between the FM12 and the S10 is the ability of some FM12's to mount two filters to the mask simultaneously, as was done by the SBS in the Gulf War. When only one filter is fitted to a mask that has the ability to accept two, a blanking plug must be used.

The harness of the FM12 consists of elastic strips, which connect to a mesh fabric piece on the back of the wearer's head. This change from the rubber straps of the S10 was designed to enable the mask to be worn for longer periods of time without discomfort, and also to hold the mask tighter to the face for a better seal.

== Variants ==
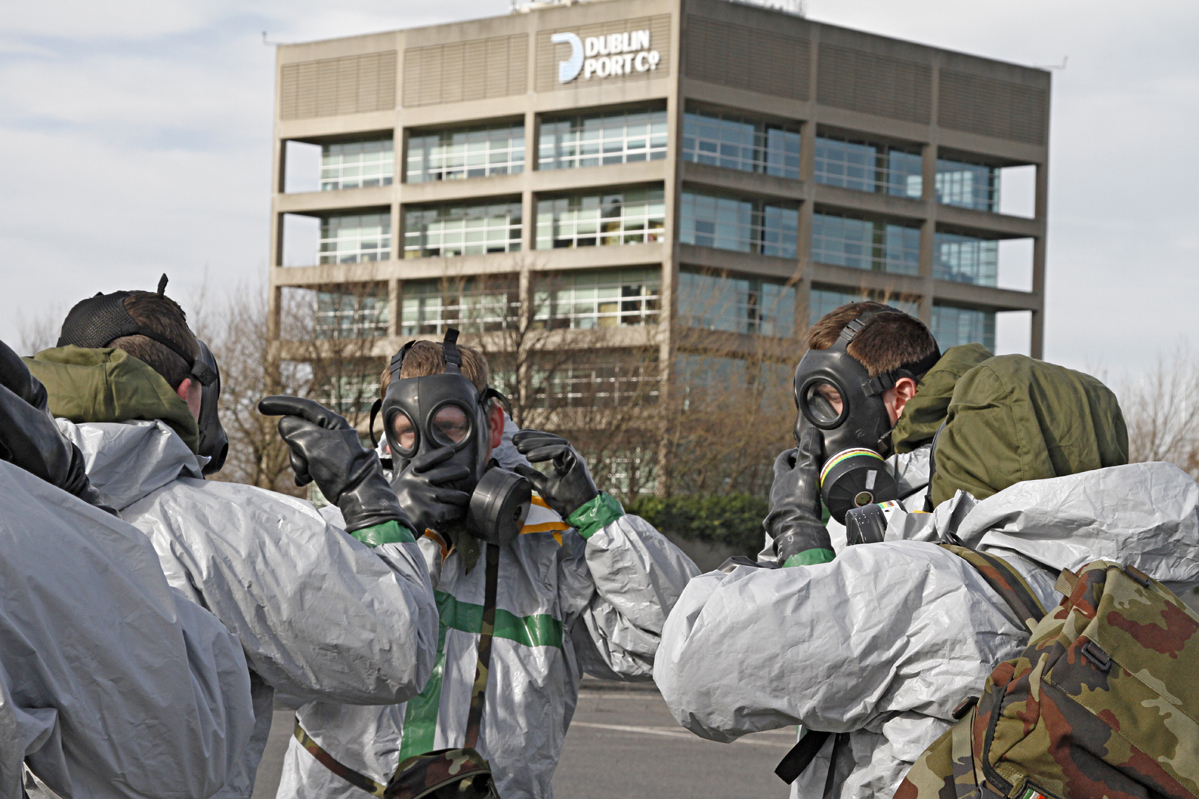
Irish military EOD specialists checking the fit of their FM12 gas masks, showing the 6-point mesh harnesses

=== CT12 ===
Respirator used for counter-terrorism operations. The difference between the FM12 and the CT12 is that the CT12 has had the drinking straw removed and sealed at the factory. This is to reduce the overall weight of the respirator, as the straw is not needed in a counter-terrorist situation. This variant is considerably rarer than the FM12.

=== CT12-IM ===
This variant is very similar to the CT12, except it has a built in microphone in place of the drinking port for operations where communication is necessary. This variant is also rarer than the FM12 and the CT12 variant, with not much information about it being disclosed on the internet.

== Users ==
- Belgium: Used in the Belgian Army
- New Zealand: Used by the New Zealand Army
- Denmark: Used in the Danish Army - designated ABC-Maske M/93
- Ireland: Used in the Irish Army
- Singapore: Singapore Police Force
- United Kingdom: Used by most British police forces, CT12 & Fm12 are used by SAS forces
- United States: Los Angeles Police Department, Chicago Police Department
- The Netherlands: Used in the Dutch Army
- Norway: Used in the Norwegian Army also used by the Norwegian civil defence

== Gallery ==
In Australian service, 2002

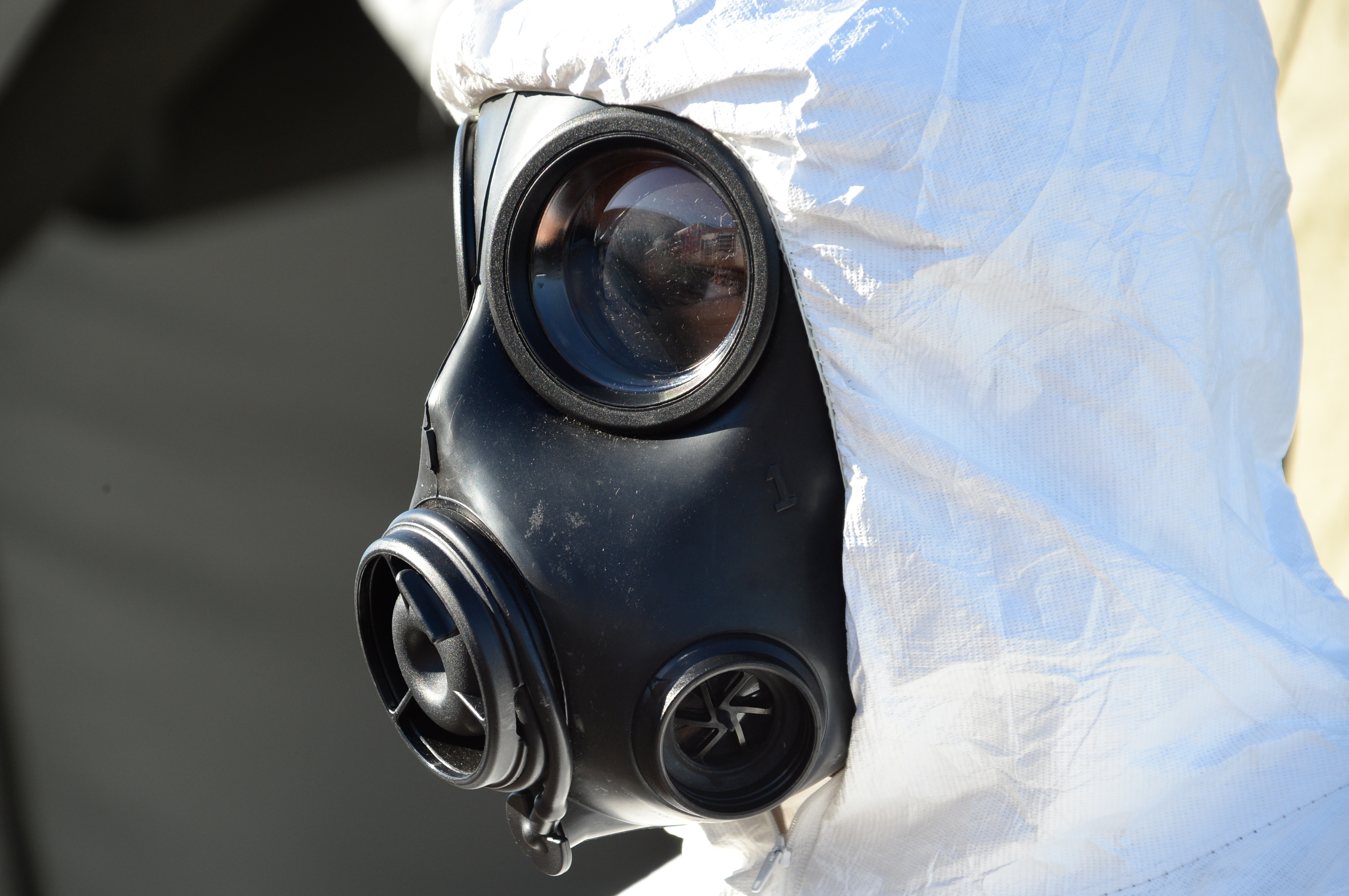
A Brazilian serviceman in an FM12 gas mask without a filter and a hazmat suit

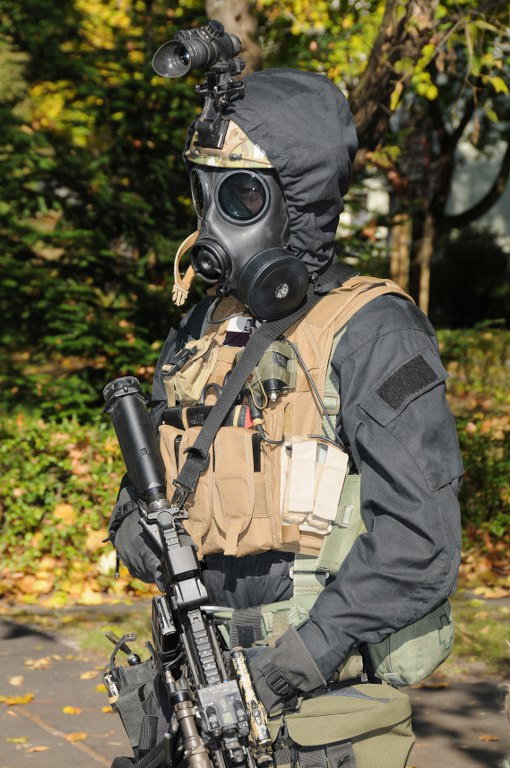
A Polish SOF soldier in an FM12

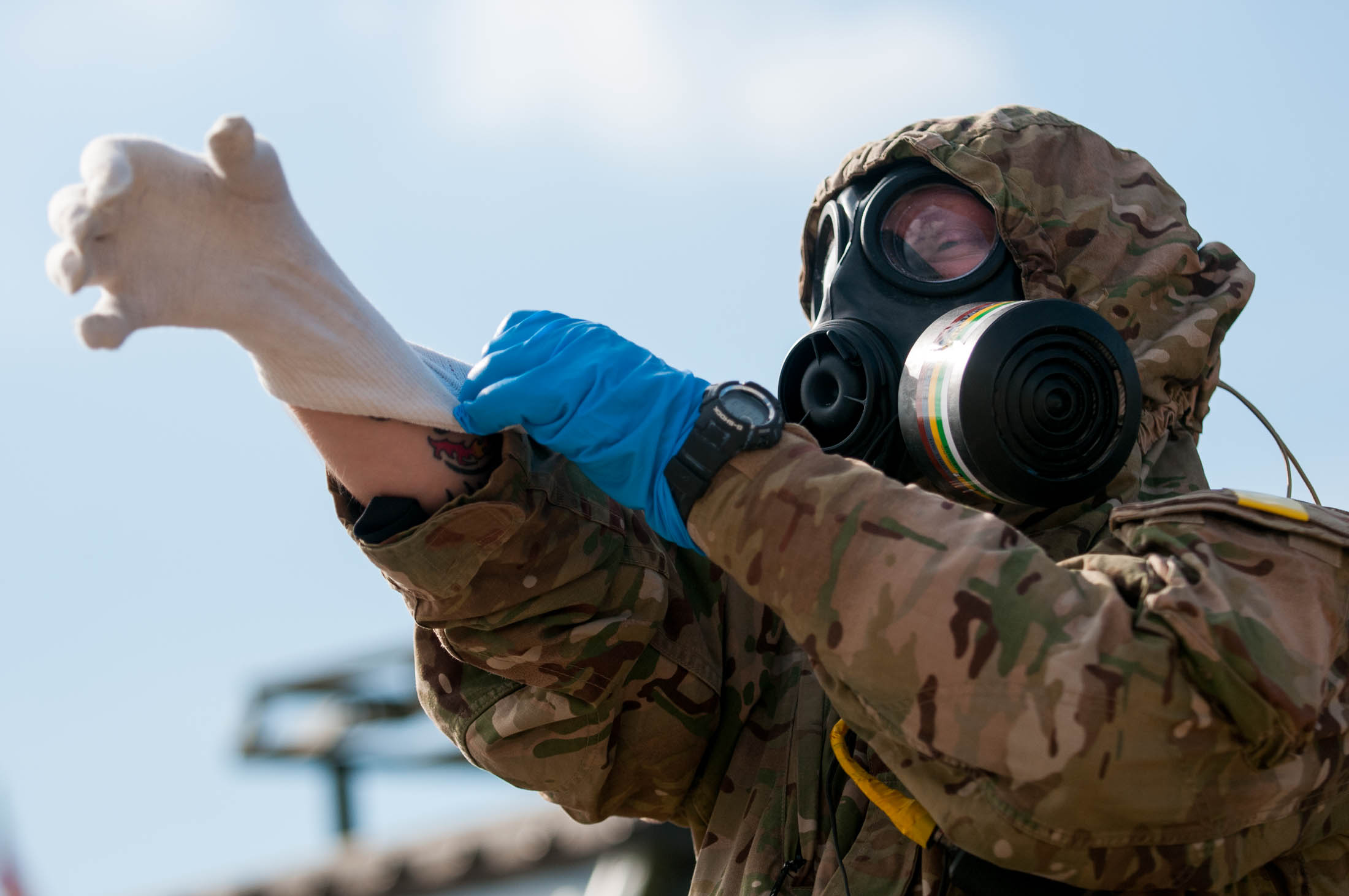
A Danish CBRN specialist in FM12 during Trident Juncture 2015 MILEX

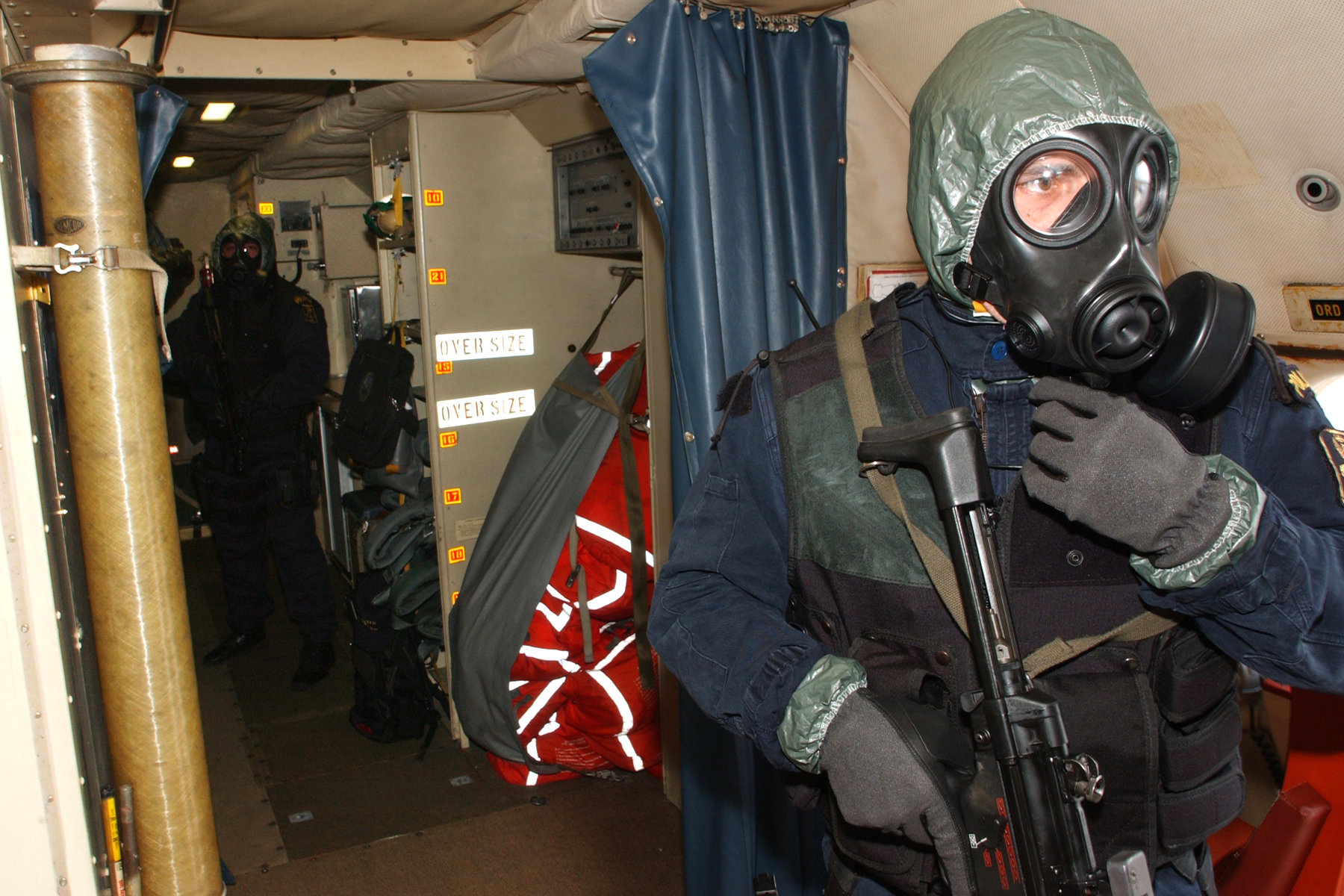
Italian police special unit (NOCS) officers (one in foreground, another in background) in CT12 gas masks

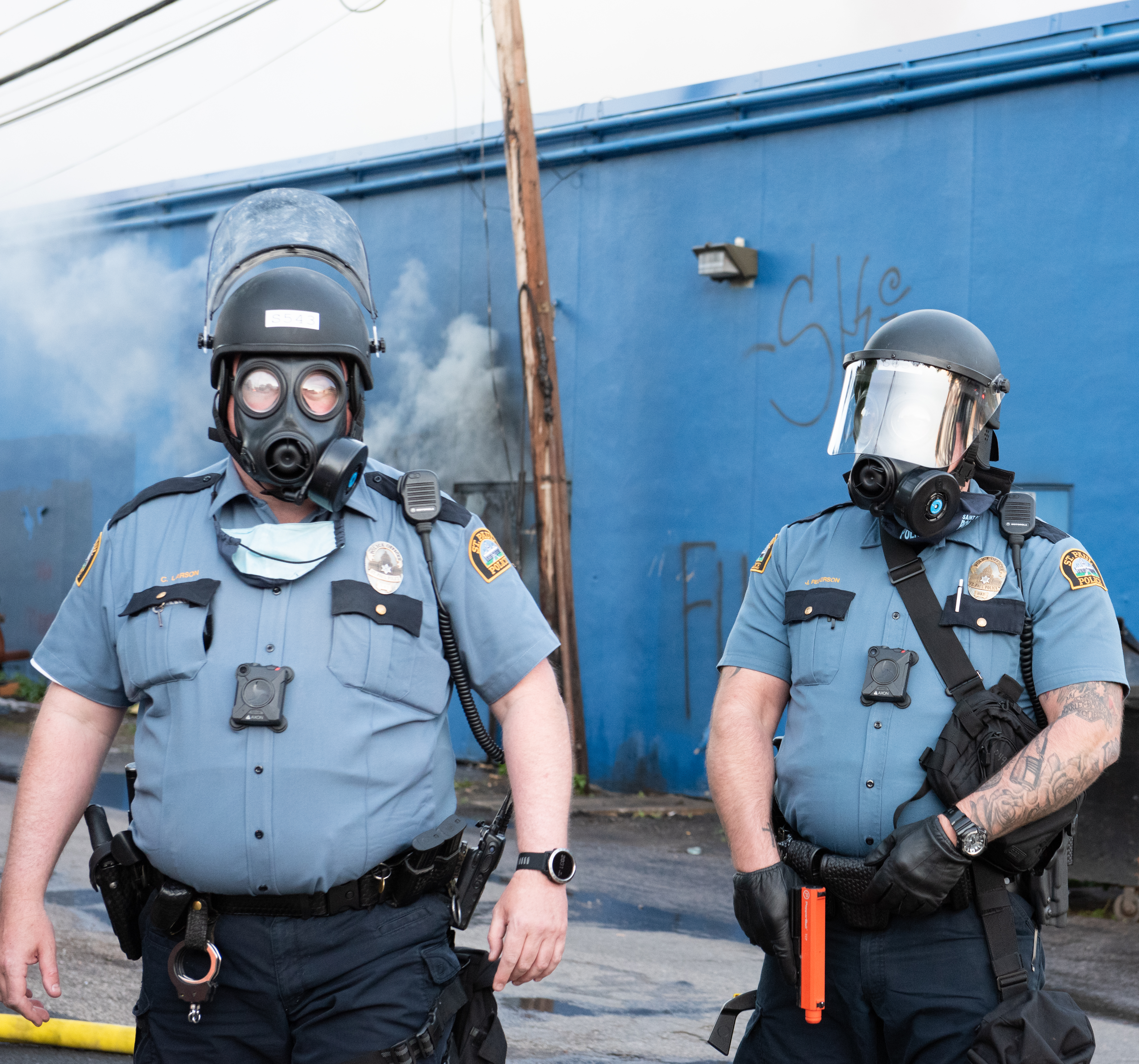
Officers of the Saint Paul Police Department in FM12 gas masks on 2020 George Floyd protests in the city

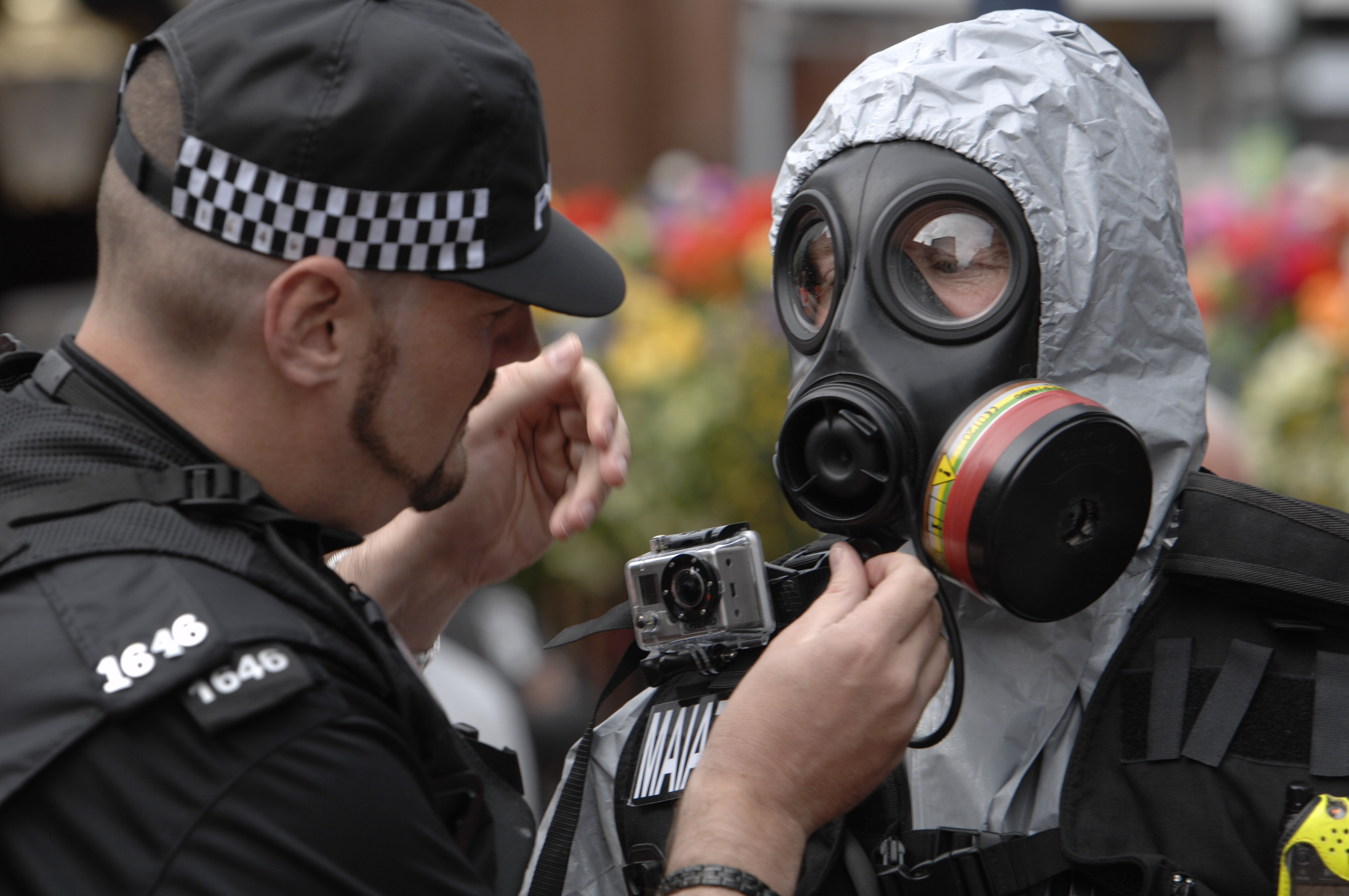
West Midlands Police CBRN exercise, 2012

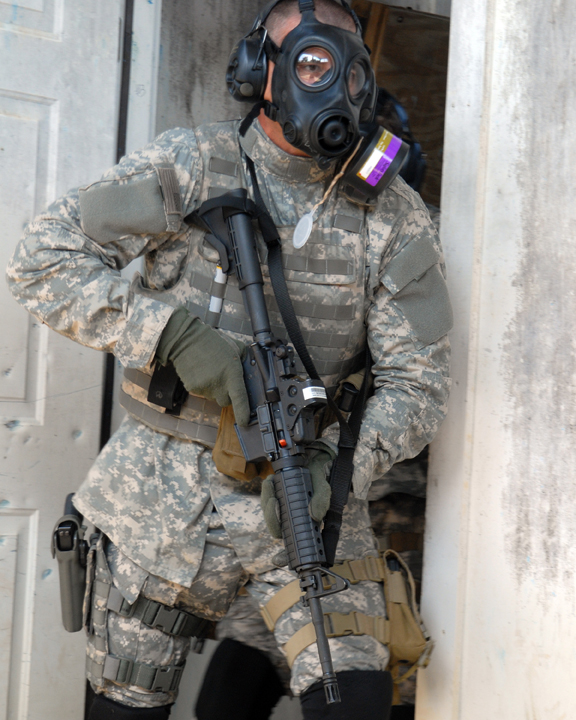
In use by the US Federal Protective Forces, 2008

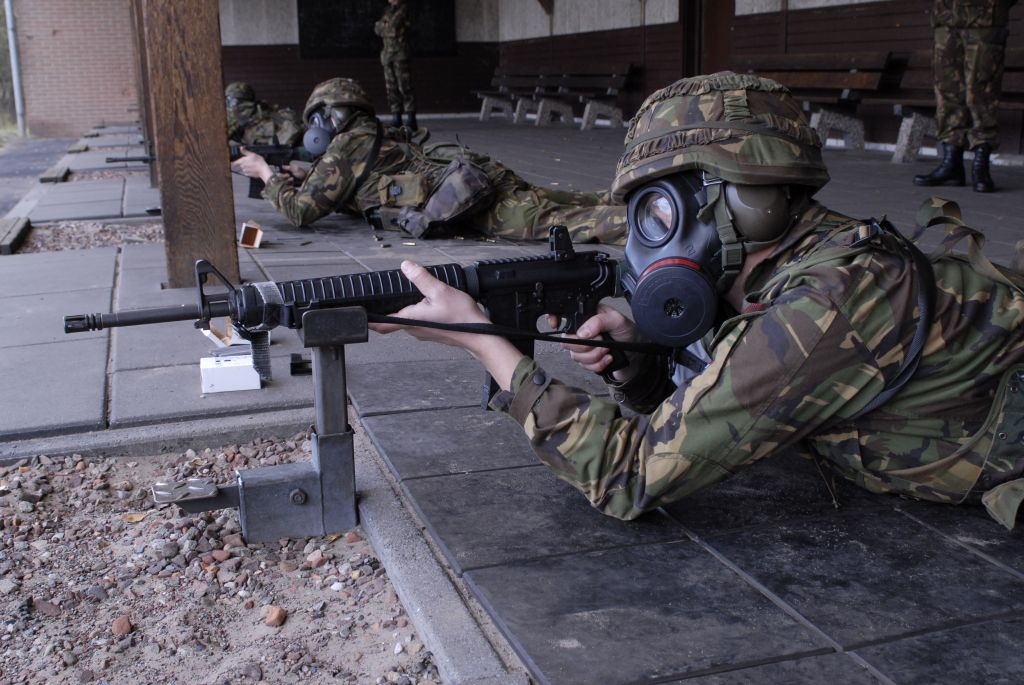
Dutch reservists training, 2008

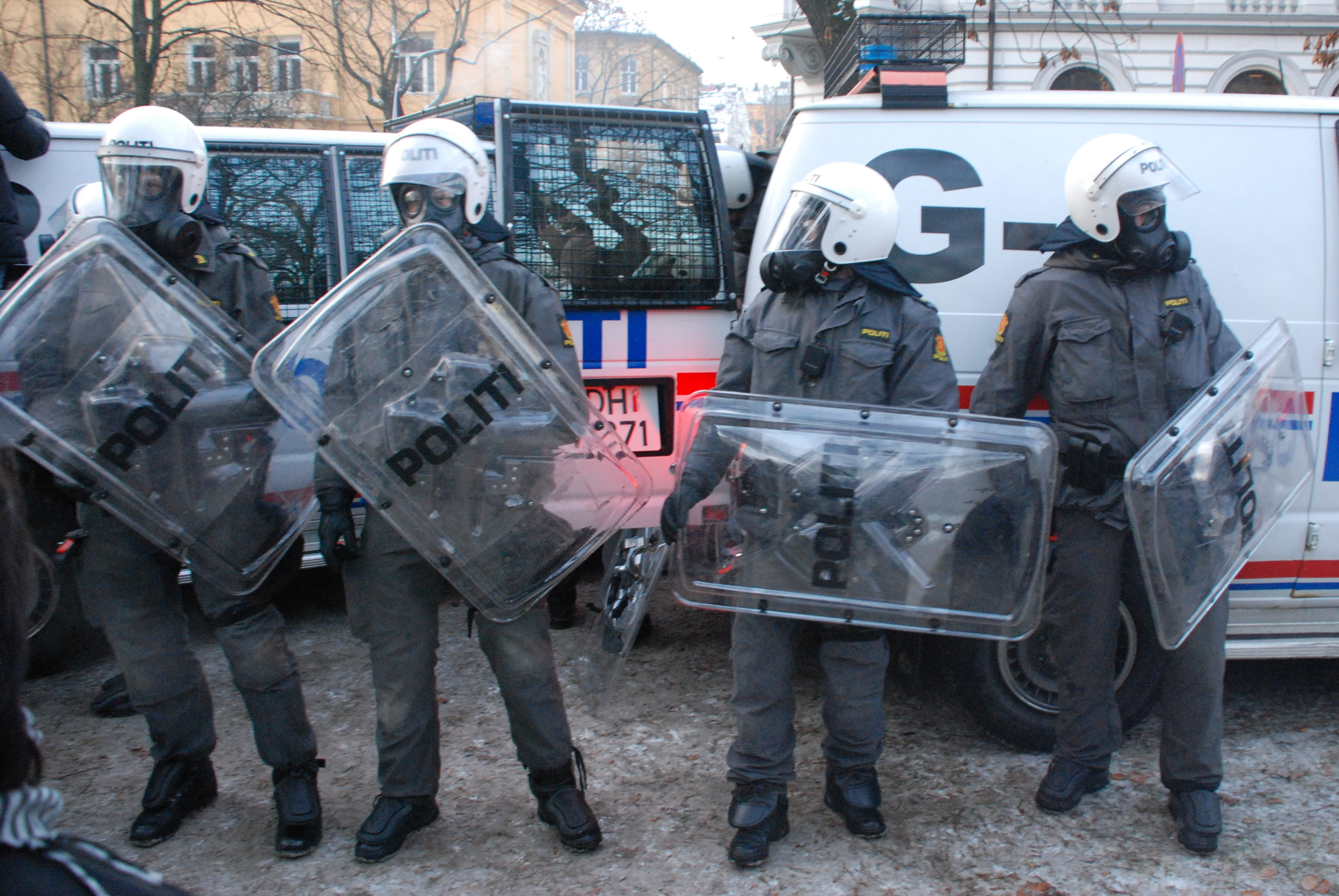
Norwegian police on a protest, 2009
