= M40 field protective mask =

Gas mask used by the US military

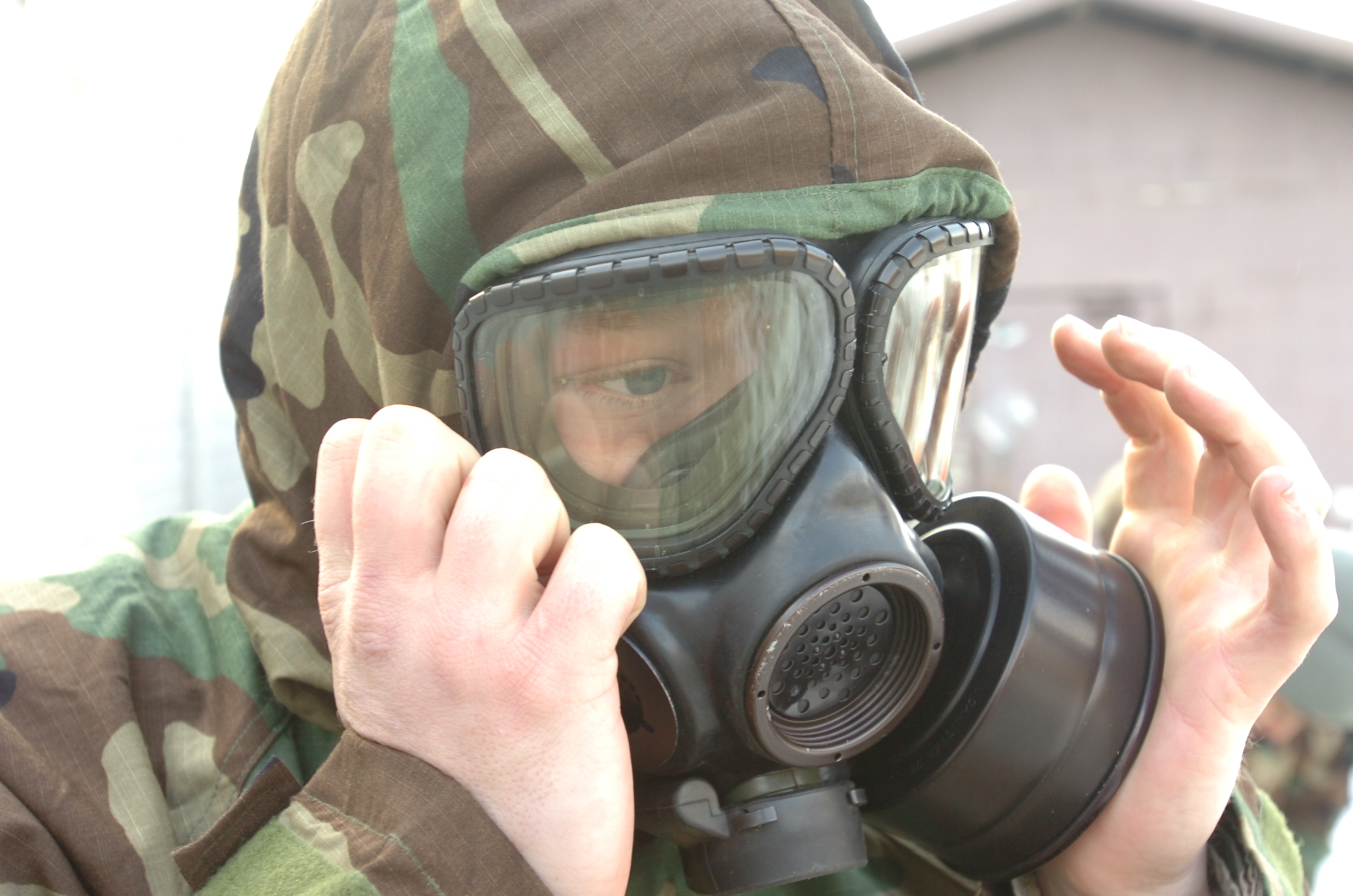
- A soldier from the 70th Brigade Support Battalion, 210th Fires Brigade, 2nd Infantry Division wears the M40 during an NBC exercise in South Korea.
- Type: Gas mask
- Place of origin: United States

Service history
- In service: 1992–Present (U.S. military, limited use after 2006)
- Used by: See Users

Production history
- Designed: 1980s

The M40 field protective mask was one of various protective masks used by the United States Armed Forces and its allies to protect from field concentrations of chemical and biological agents, along with radiological fallout particles. It is not effective in an oxygen deficient environment or against ammonia.

== History ==
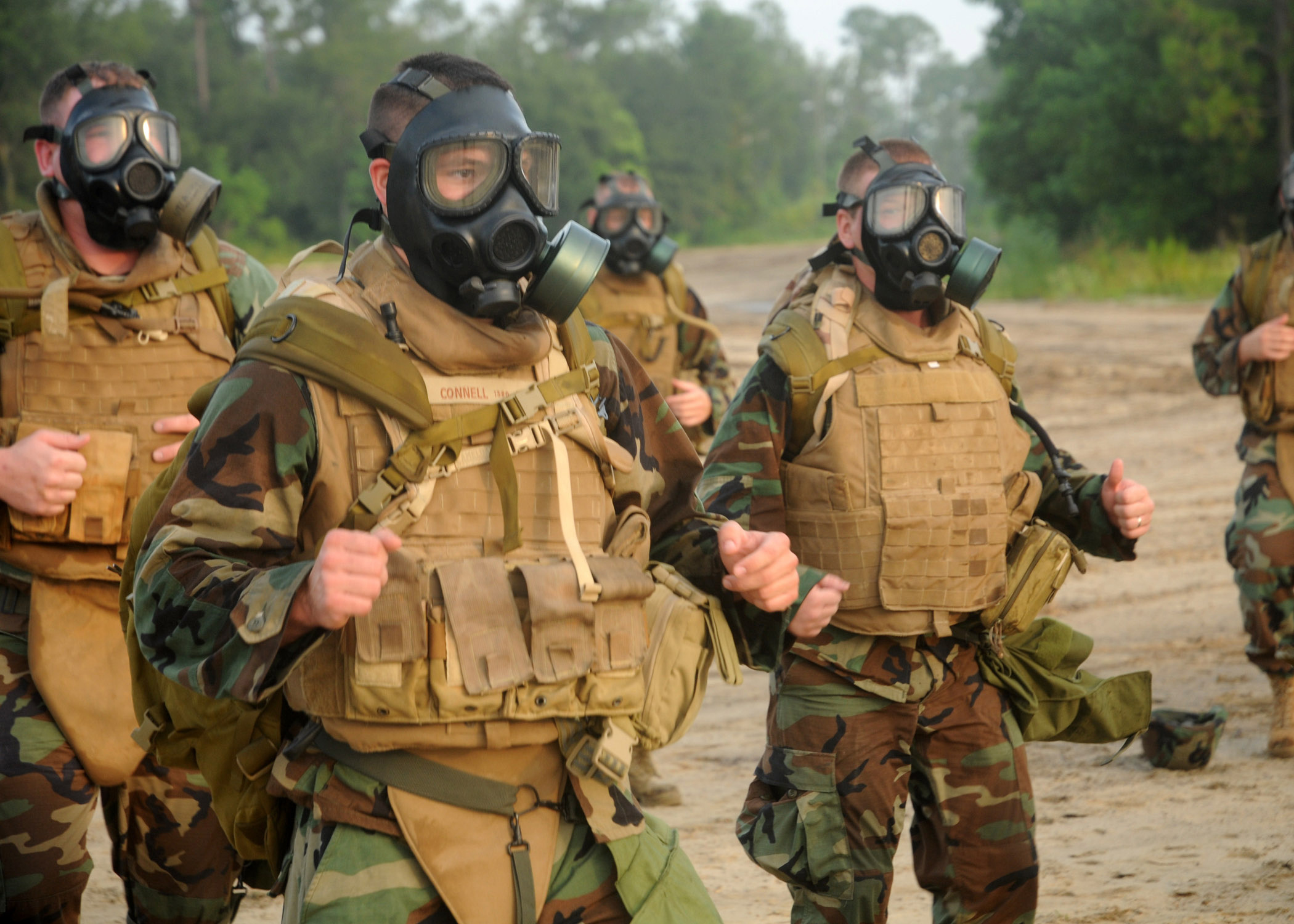
US Navy Seabees jog during an exercise with M40s worn.

The M40 was the result of a program in the 1980s to develop a successor to the M17-series protective masks which had been in service with the US armed forces since 1959. The M40 was to be a return to conventional protective mask design with an external side-mounted filter canister, rather than the internal cheek filters of the M17, which were awkward to change, especially in a contaminated environment.

The M40 was phased into service with the U.S. Army and Marine Corps in the mid-1990s, with another new design, the MCU-2/P also replacing the older M17 in service with the U.S. Air Force and Navy. However, both masks suffered from the inadequate protective capabilities of their face pieces, which was of a silicone rubber that provided a close fit, but at the price of low resistance to penetration by common chemical agents. Silicone is supposedly susceptible to corrosion from blister agents. Thus, the masks were effectively ill-suited for protecting against much more than riot control agents, and a butyl rubber 'second skin' had to be quickly issued for fitting over and reinforcing the M40 facepiece to make it effective in its intended role.

The M40A1 thus often has an inner skin of silicone rubber and an outer "second skin" of butyl rubber.

The M42 series masks are a variant of this mask with alterations that make it better suited for use by armored vehicle crews, who have to connect their masks to and draw air from their vehicle's own filtration system. The M40 field protective mask is currently being replaced by the M50 joint service general purpose mask.

On September 2, 2017, the Philippine Marine Corps received 1,000 M40 gas masks and C2 filters through the U.S. Embassy's Mutual Logistics Support Agreement program.

== Design ==
The M40 field protective mask features three voicemitters, one on either the right or left side, and one in front. A voicecom adapter may be placed over the front voicemitter to amplify the user's voice. The mask can be adjusted in the field to accept the filtering canister on either side, so that a weapon may be shouldered. Right-handed shooters will normally locate the canister on the left side of the mask and vice versa.

The C2 canister on the M40 mask can protect the user from up to 15 nerve, choking, and blister agent attacks, and two blood agent attacks.

The M40 comes with a drinking system that allows the user to drink water after donning the mask for long periods of time in a chemically contaminated environment. In order to use the drinking system the user must also have suitably equipped canteen lids or an adapter for other containers.

== The prototype ==
In 1983, ILC Dover came out with the first, heavily influenced by the M17 mask, prototype of M40: the XM40 mask. Throughout its development it got numerous important changes that helped pave the way towards the final product, such as increased rigidity, bulk reduction and the removal of a dimple under the voice diaphragm for clearing the mask.

A year later, in 1984, the prototype was finalized as the M40 Field Protective Mask, but it did not enter service until after the Gulf War. It was mass-produced and mainstay issued from 1992 onwards.

Nowadays, XM40 models are considered extremely rare and valuable.

== Users ==
=== Current ===
- Philippines: In service with the Philippine Army and Philippine Marine Corps, supplied from the Joint U.S. Military Assistance Group.
- Iraq: Used by the Iraqi Counter terrorism service along with the M50 gas mask

=== Former ===
- United States: Replaced by the M50 joint service general purpose mask in active service. Still used by U.S. Army Reserve and National Guard units and USMC Reserve as of 2021.
