= MCU-2/P protective mask =

Gas mask used by the US military

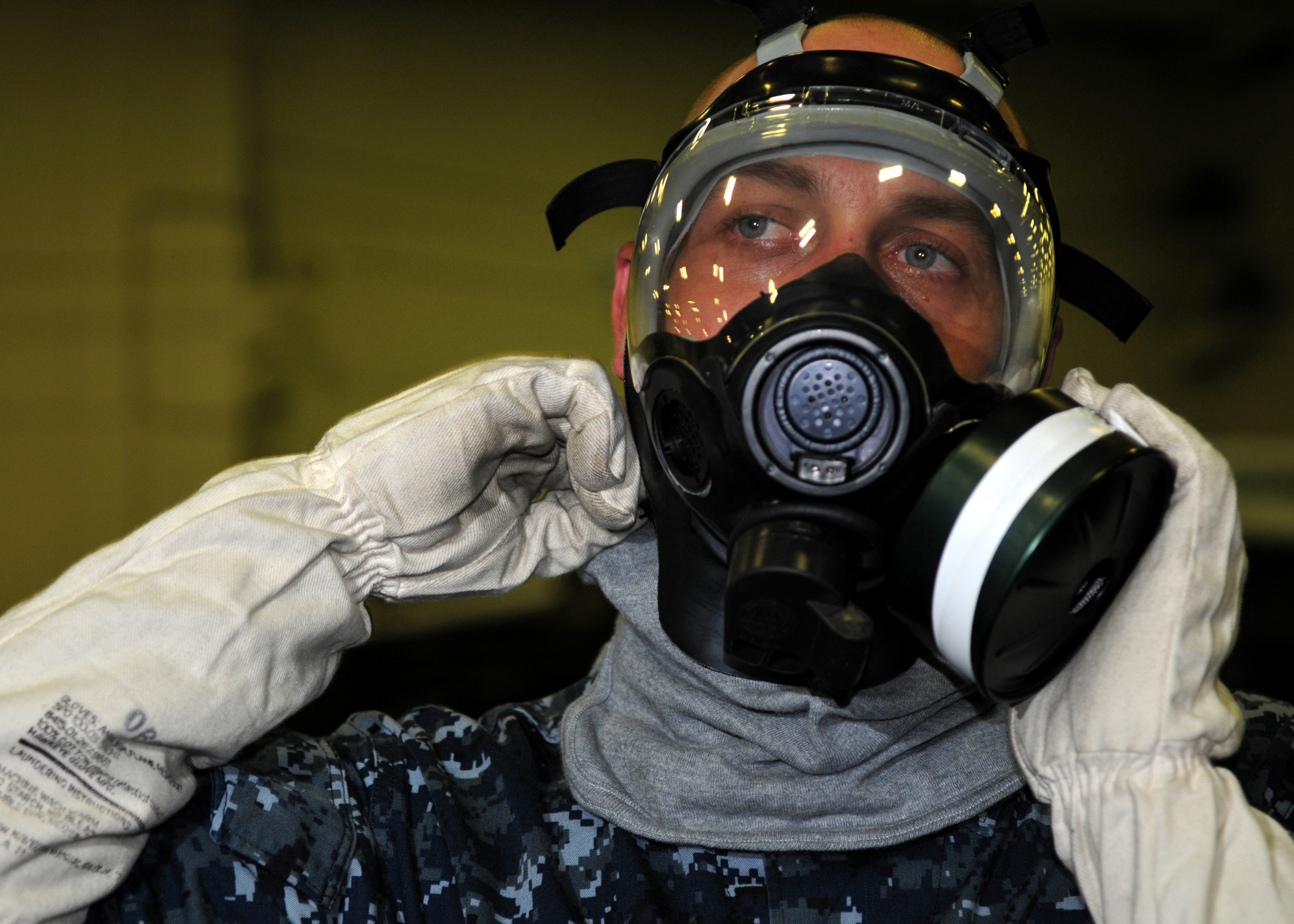
A United States Navy sailor donning a MCU-2P protective mask during a chemical, biological, and radiological (CBR) drill aboard the USS George H.W. Bush (CVN-77).

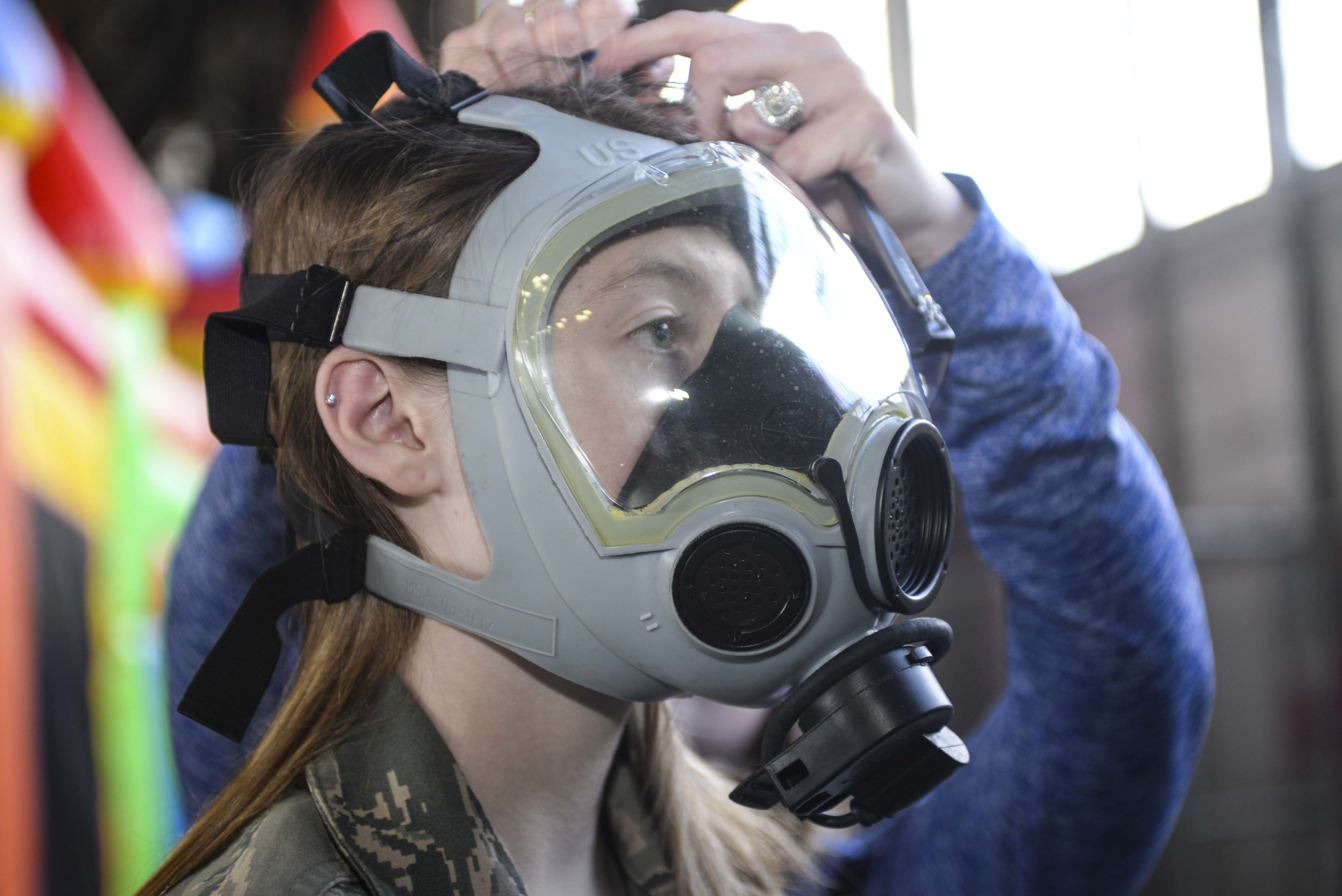
At Ellsworth Air Force Base

The MCU-2/P is a protective mask used by the United States Air Force and United States Navy, originally designed for the US Army as the XM-30 mask. In December 1982, the U.S. Air Force took over the XM-30 mask development. In 1983, the U.S. Navy requested the first masks off the production lines since the Army mask was no longer in production and the Navy had none. The Air Force agreed, except to get 5,000 masks to support a 1985 Technology Demonstration. Production began in 1985 and some active duty Sailors and Airmen had a new protective mask before Operation Desert Storm in 1991. It replaced the earlier M17 gas mask and is itself scheduled to be replaced by the M50 joint service general purpose mask. The MCU-2/P features a single large lens and a side-mounted filter. A clear or tinted visor and protective hood are used in conjunction with the mask.

Like the Army and USMC M40 mask, the MCU-2/P's silicone rubber facepiece was found to be susceptible to corrosion from blister agents, rendering it of little value on the battlefield. A black rubber "second skin" can be worn over this to prevent corrosion.

== MCU 2A/P ==
This is a related version with some extra features, such as a front microphone plug.
