= S10 NBC Respirator =

Gas mask used by the British military

S10 CBRN Respirator
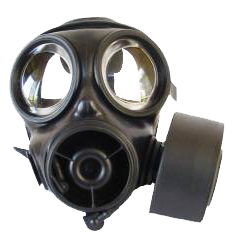
- A S10 respirator with a filter
- Type: Gas mask
- Place of origin: United Kingdom

Service history
- In service: 1986–present
- Used by: See Users

Production history
- Manufacturer: Avon
- Variants: See Variants

The S10 CBRN Respirator is a military gas mask that was formerly used within all branches of the British Armed Forces. Following the mask's replacement by the General Service Respirator in 2011, the S10 is now widely available to the public on the army surplus market.

== History ==
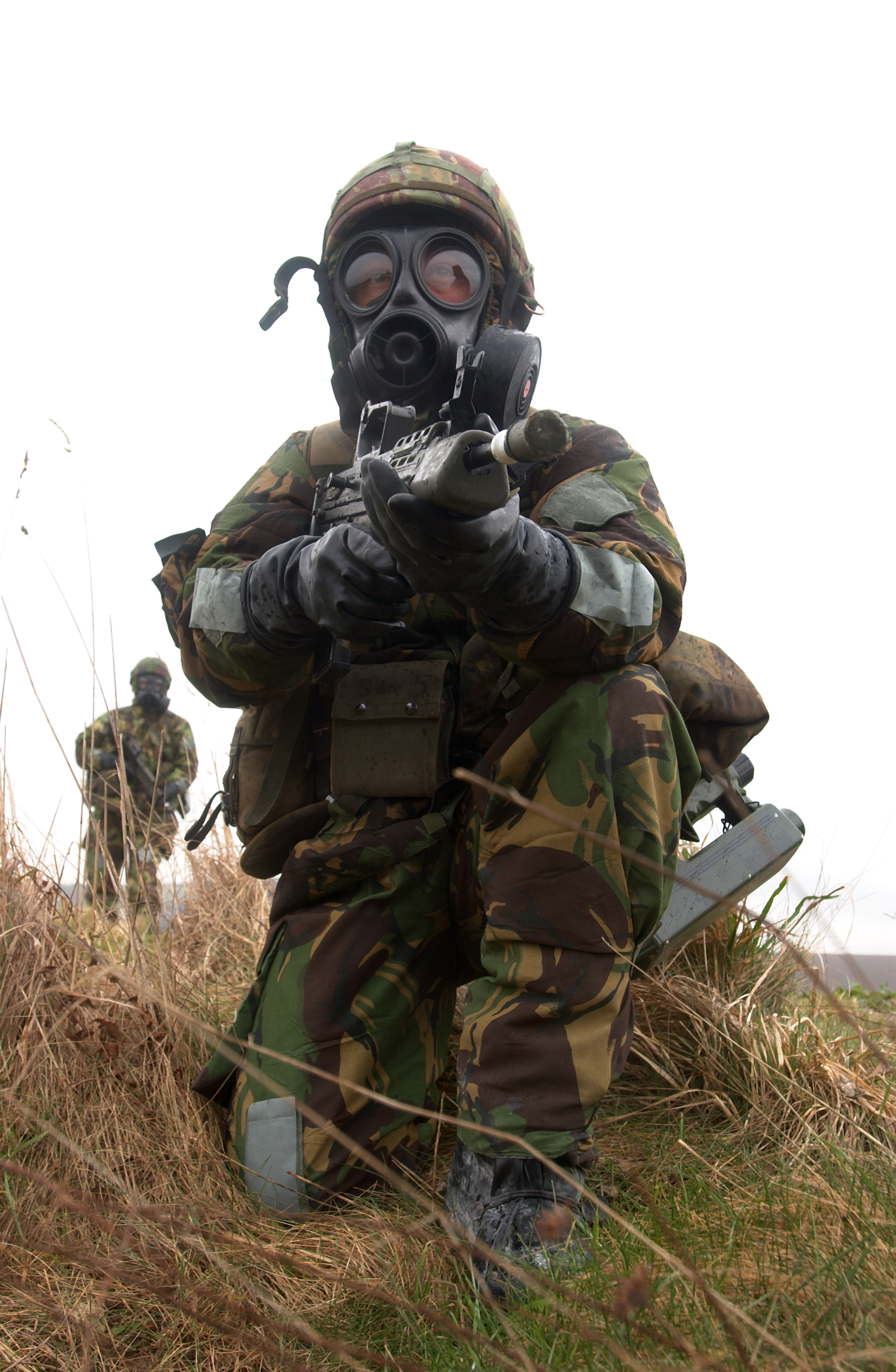
A British soldier with the S10 respirator during Chemical, Biological, Radiological and Nuclear (CBRN) warfare exercises

The S10 was introduced in 1986 as a replacement for the S6 NBC Respirator in service from the 1960s, and is manufactured by Avon Rubber. S10s were issued to British nationals in Saudi Arabia during the 1991 Gulf War and were marked by a blue coloured PSM (Primary Speech Module) fitting or a blue painted spot on the forehead.

The S10 respirator was originally due to be replaced by the new General Service Respirator (GSR) in 2007, although replacement efforts officially began in 2011 and all S10 Respirators have since been replaced with the GSR. All issued filters for the S10 have expired, the last of which expired in 2014. No new S10 Respirators will be bought.

== Characteristics ==
The mask includes a fail-safe drinking device, a Secondary Speech Transmitter (SST) on the side which a Clansman radio system microphone can be clipped to, and corrective lenses can be fitted to the eyepieces. The mask also contains an inner oro-nasal mask to decrease fogging on the lenses. This mask is fitted with optical insert hooks, and therefore can be used by soldiers who wear glasses.

== Variants ==
Variants include:

- SF10, intended for security and special forces use (replaced, at least in SAS service, by the CT12 version of the FM12). Does not contain a drinking port.
- AR10 for police forces
- N10, a commercial version.
- PAK10, Pakistani licensed variant.
- SF10-IM, Similar to the SF10, but has a built in microphone in place of the drinking port.

== Users ==
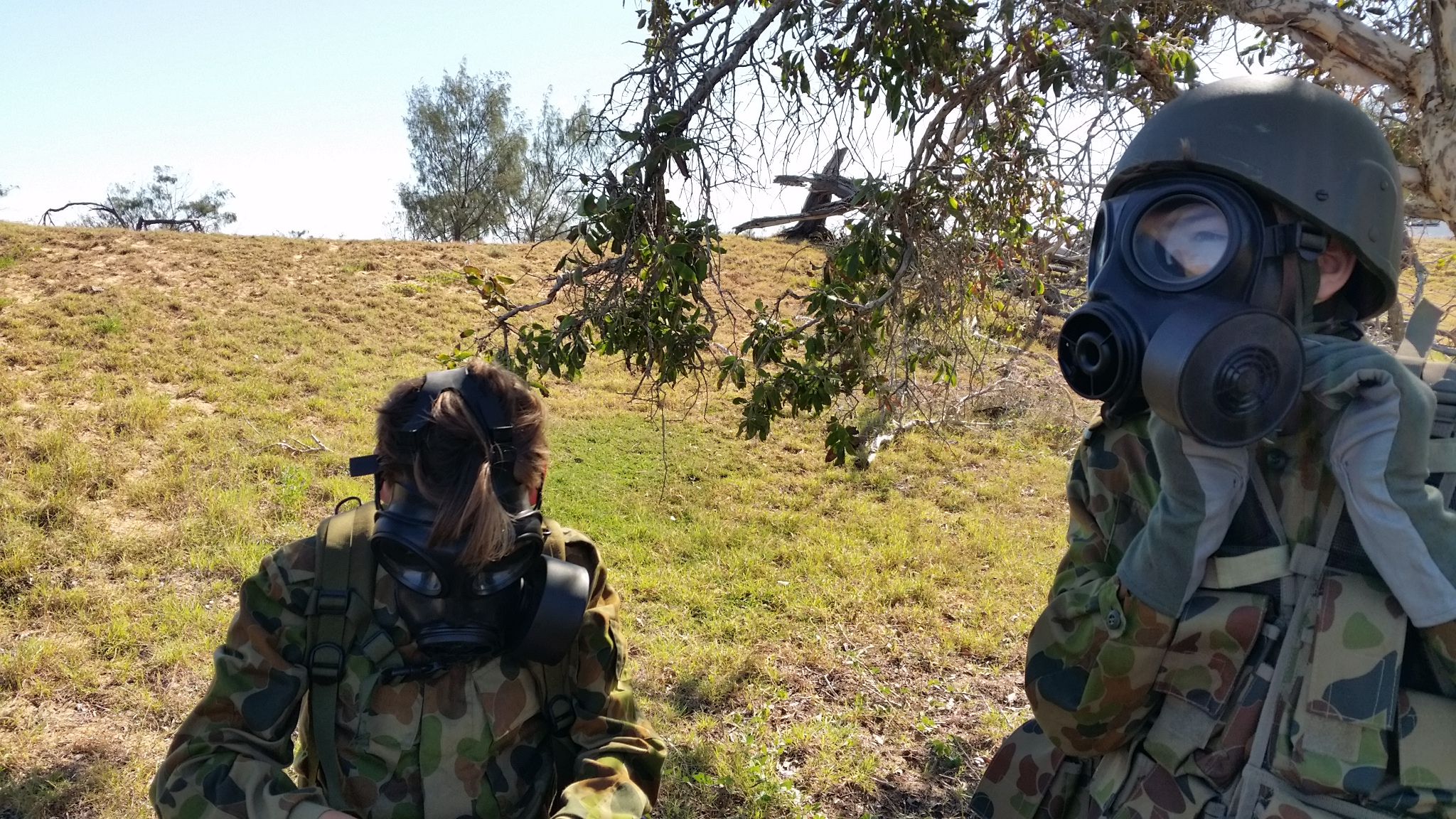
Australian Army Cadets in gas masks

=== Current ===
- Australia: As of November 2017.
- Hong Kong: S-10 and SF-10 used by the Special Duties Unit. Being replaced by the MSA Advantage 1000 CBA-RCA. Known to be used by the Police Tactical Unit during anti-riot duties.
- Pakistan: Pakistan Armed Forces: PAK-10 and SD-10 (SF-10 variant) in service.

=== Former ===
- Italy: After using the S6 NBC Respirator in the 1970s, NOCS ('Central Security Operations Service') and the Gruppo di intervento speciale ('Special Intervention Group') use the S10 Respirator. To be replaced with FM12.
- United Kingdom: Formerly issued to the British Armed Forces, but was replaced in 2011 by the General Service Respirator. It is likely that small stockpiles of S10 masks are kept for research purposes.
