= M17 gas mask =

Gas mask used by the US military

M17 Protective Mask
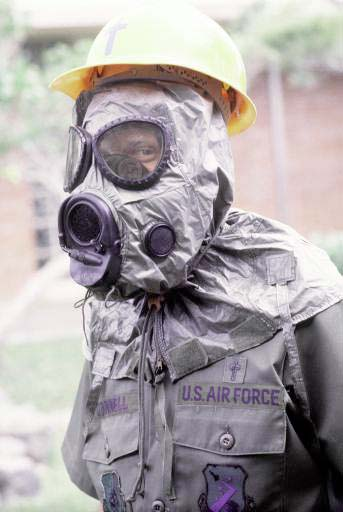
- M-17 nuclear, biological and chemical warfare mask and hood
- Type: Gas mask
- Place of origin: United States

Service history
- In service: 1959–1992
- Used by: See Users
- Wars: Vietnam War; Iran–Iraq War; Gulf War

Production history
- Designed: 1959
- Produced: 1959–1980s

The M17 Protective Mask is a series of gas masks that were designed and produced in 1959 to provide protection from all types of known chemical and biological agents present.

== History ==
The M17 gas mask was produced in 1959. It was issued to troops in the Vietnam War, and was standard issue for the U.S. military until it was replaced by the M40 Field Protective Mask for the U.S. Army and USMC in the mid 1990s while the U.S. Air Force and U.S. Navy replaced it for the MCU-2/P Gas Mask in the mid-1980s.

== Design ==
The mask has different components including a filter, a face piece and outserts. Filter elements in the face piece prevent harmful agents from entering the mask. The M17 series includes three types of masks, the M17, M17A1 and M17A2 An experimental transparent-silicone model called the XM27 was designed in late 1966, but was turned down in favor of the XM28E4.

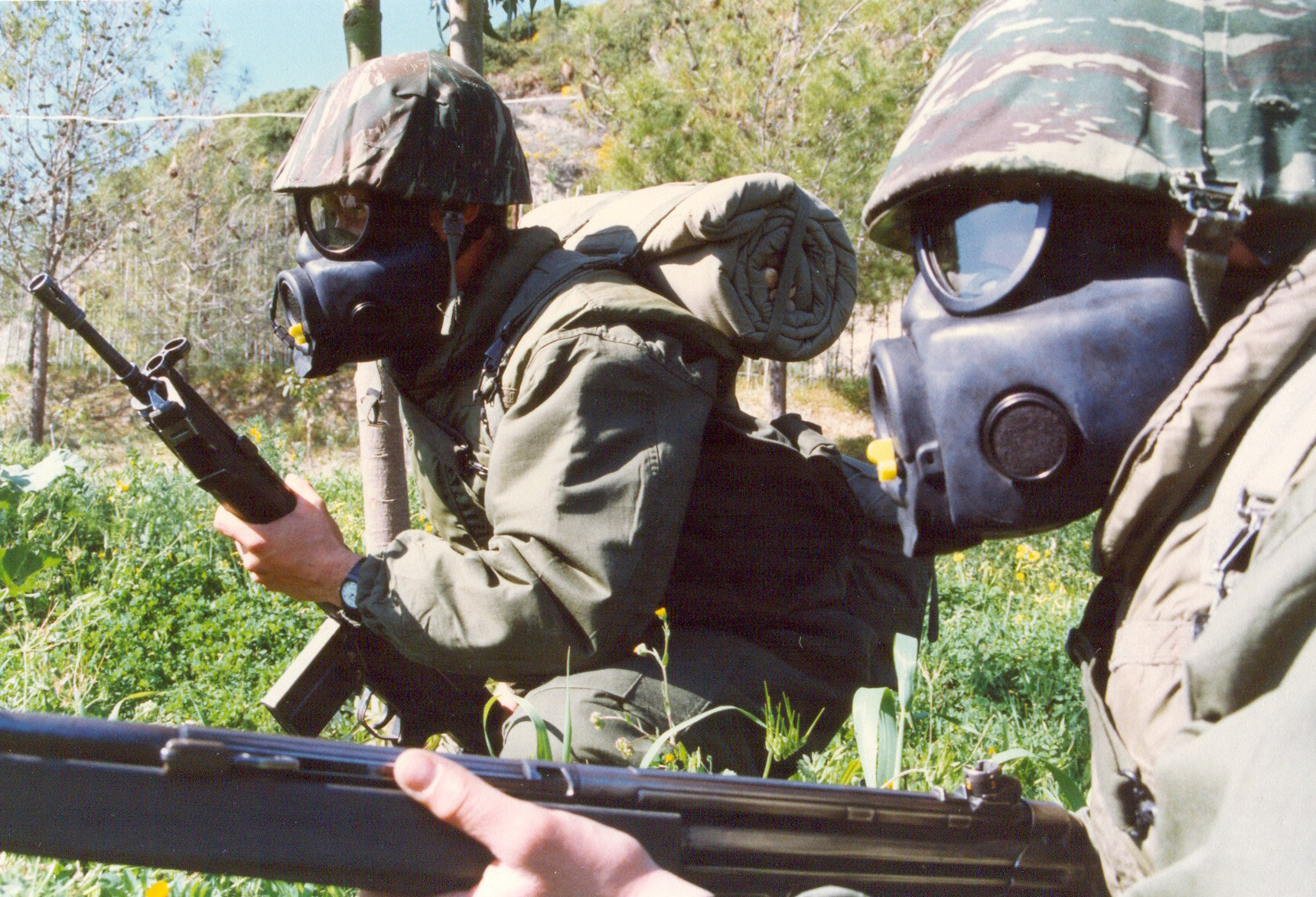
Hellenic army personnel wearing M17 gas masks.

These protective masks have inbuilt voice emitter systems that facilitate communication, a tube for drinking water from the M1 canteen cap (A1 & A2), and a pair of outserts to protect eye lenses and an air pathway that reduced fogging. Three varieties of outserts were available for the mask; clear for general operations, gray tinted for bright environments, and green tinted to protect the wearer from battlefield lasers. Old, clear outserts tended to yellow with time and was considered a deadlining condition for the mask since accurate color vision was required to assess sometimes subtle color changes on the M256A1 chemical detection kit required for unmasking procedures. The mask is packed in a carrier that also contains other items like a nerve agent antidote kit (NAAK), a convulsive antidote for nerve agents (CANA) and an M-258A1 decontamination kit. It also contains a M1 waterproof bag to protect filter elements from water damage.

Other components attached are mask hoods to protect the head and neck area, a winterization kit to prevent frost accumulation during cold weather conditions and optical inserts for soldiers with vision defects. The M17A1 was designed with intent to allow a masked soldier to provide artificial respiration to an unmasked casualty, the resuscitation tube was a noble idea gone wrong. The problem with it being the exposure of both soldiers to contamination, the soldier giving aid ran the risk of encountering resistance from the airway of the casualty, pushing air back into his mask and breaking the seal on it. The casualty would remain unmasked, and would continue absorbing the contaminated environment. It was for this reason that the resuscitation tube system was no longer issued for the A1 and was dropped on the M17A2.

The design of the mask with its internal cheek filters means that it must be removed by the wearer to change the filters once they are expired or clogged, thus compromising its protective capabilities in a contaminated environment. The US armed forces henceforth returned to 'traditional' designs of mask where filter canisters are mounted externally and thus can be changed if needed without the wearer having to remove the mask.

The mask offers protection from chemical and biological warfare agents, but does not function properly in places where oxygen content is low. The mask is not meant to be used for firefighting and does not provide protection from radiation, however the filters will stop irradiated particles from entering the respiratory system of the wearer. It is recommended that users continue wearing it until the biological or chemical agent is identified and verified cleared from the area using standardized unmasking procedures.

== Variants ==
- M17A1 - Variant made in 1966 with drinking straw.
- M17A2 - Variant made with extra small size. Resuscitation tubing removed.

=== Copies ===
Notable copies include the Bulgarian PDE-1, Japanese Type-3, the Polish MP-4 and the Czech M-10.

== Users ==
- Australia: Adopted by the Australian Army.
- Greece: Adopted by the Hellenic Army.
- Malaysia: Used by Malaysian riot police.
- Thailand: Adopted by the Royal Thai Army.
- United States: Formerly used by all branches of the U.S. military.
- Iran: Used by the Iranian Army.
