= 3M Scott Fire & Safety =

American manufacturer of personal protective equipment

3M Scott Fire & Safety logo

3M Scott Fire & Safety is an American manufacturer of respiratory and personal protective equipment including supplied air and air purifying respirators, compressors, gas detection systems and thermal imaging cameras. The company was founded in 1932 as Uniloy Accessories Corporation, and is located in Monroe, North Carolina. In 2001 it was acquired by Tyco International and in 2017 it was acquired by 3M.

== History: Uniloy and Scott Aviation ==
In 1932 the company was founded in Lancaster, New York by Earl M. Scott as Uniloy Accessories Corporation, an aeronautics parts producer. It later changed its name to Scott Aviation, and that same year they began creating a portable on-board oxygen system for their pilots. In 1945 they began producing the Air-Pak SCBA, after which use of the SCBA began in the field of firefighting. Scott Aviation was acquired by Figgie International in 1967, and in 1976 Scott Aviation partnered with NASA to produce the first high-pressure SCBA. The company was renamed Scott Technologies in 1997, and in 1999 it separated into two companies: Scott Aviation and Scott Health and Safety.

The company is headquartered in Monroe, North Carolina, and the company has facilities in other locations, including the UK, Australia, China, and Abu Dhabi. Scott Safety produces fire safety apparatuses, including PPE, air purifying respirators, compressors, and gas detection systems. These are used by military personnel, industrial workers, and first responders, including firefighters. Prior to 2001, the company was traded on the NASDAQ under the ticker symbol SCTT. In 2001 the company was acquired by Tyco International, and in 2011 it changed its name from Scott Health and Safety to Scott Safety. In 2014 Scott Safety acquired the gas and flame protection company Industrial Safety Technologies for $329.5 million. In 2017, 3M entered negotiations to acquire Scott Safety for $2 billion. On April 26, 2018, 3M announced the rebranding of Scott Safety to 3M Scott Fire & Safety.

In March 2026, 3M announced that it had entered into a definitive agreement to acquire Madison Fire & Rescue, in partnership with Bain Capital, and combine that business with Scott Safety in a new fire and safety joint venture. Under the announced terms, 3M would contribute Scott Safety to the venture, receive $700 million in cash proceeds at closing, and own 50.1% of the new company, with Bain Capital owning 49.9%. The joint venture was expected to acquire Madison Fire & Rescue from Madison Industries for $1.95 billion and close in the second half of 2026, subject to customary closing conditions.

== Apparatuses ==
The company still produces its flagship product, the Scott Air-Pak SCBA. Scott Safety creates several kinds of compressor systems including the HushAir 7500 Connect which includes the HushAir Connect RevolveAir Connect for filling SCBA cylinders, and SmartTouch Controller, which integrates the breathing air compressor, storage bottles, and a charge station. The systems use a 7500 psi design. It also produces the Duraflow breathing apparatus, which is used by medical personnel to avoid breathing in airborne disease such as avian flu. In addition to Scott Safety gas detection systems, they have published a gas detection system reference guide that covers various gases and their health effects.

In 2016 Scott Safety began producing firefighting masks with thermal imaging named Scott Sight, which supplements hand held thermal imaging technology. Inside the helmet there is a screen that allows firefighters to view the thermal imaging results at the same time they are viewing outside the mask. The image appears in the peripheral view, at nine frames per second over a period of up to four hours. The camera and display mounted in the helmet weighs 8.5 ounces.
