= S6 NBC Respirator =

Gas mask used by the British military

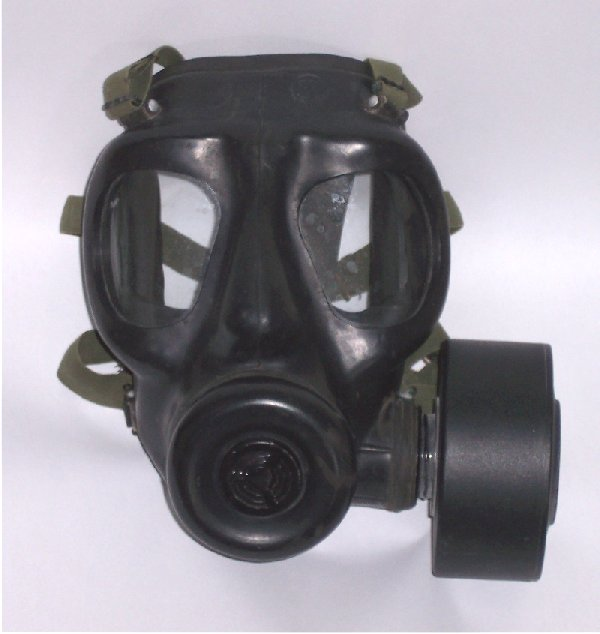
- A S6 respirator with a filter
- Type: Gas mask
- Place of origin: United Kingdom

Service history
- In service: 1966–1986 (British military)
- Used by: See Users

Production history
- Designer: Defence Science and Technology Laboratory
- Manufacturer: Leyland and Birmingham Rubber Company; Avon Rubber; Mechanical and Chemical Industry Corporation (Turkey)

The Service Respirator No. 6 (S6), also known as Respirator NBC S6 No. 1 Mark 1 was a protective gas mask issued to the British Armed Forces. It was developed in the 1950s and issued for general service from 1966 to 1986, when it was replaced by the S10. Currently, the S6 is not used by the British military.

It's usually worn in conjunction with the NBC No. 1 Mk III CBRN protective suit.

== History ==
The S6 was developed by the Chemical Defence Experimental Establishment (CDEE) from the 1950s and manufactured by Avon Rubber in Melksham, Wiltshire and the Leyland and Birmingham Rubber Company. Although made obsolete by the introduction of the S10, production of the S6 continued in Turkey after the adoption of the new mask by British forces. During the widely documented Iranian Embassy Siege of 1980, the S6 is the mask seen being worn by SAS troops.

The Turkish military adopted its own version of the S6 in 1990 with the name SR10 under license by MKEK. SR10 and its newer version the SR10-ST with a D12 drinking tube attached.

== Design ==
The S6 respirator provided protection to the face, eyes, lung and throat of the wearer against all known chemical agents of that time. The S6 features an innovative air seal around the inside of the face piece to improve the fit and comfort of the mask; a tap inside the nose cup was to allow the equalisation of pressure inside the air seal, in different climatic conditions.

A left-handed version put the filter canister on the right which allowed left-handed wearers to shoulder, aim and fire their rifle as usual.

== Variants ==
S6
Original gas mask made in the 1960s-1980s.
SR6M
Modernised copy of S6 by MKEK MAKSAM.
SR10
Turkish-made version by MKEK MAKSAM. The SR10-ST is a S6 with a drinking tube.

== Users ==
- Turkey: Known to be used by the Turkish General Directorate of Security.
- United Kingdom: British military (Replaced by S10 NBC Respirator).
