= Avon Technologies =

British manufacturing company

Avon Technologies plc
- Type: Public limited company
- Traded as: LSE: AVON
- Industry: Manufacturing
- Founded: 1885
- Headquarters: Melksham, Wiltshire, England
- Key people: Bruce Thompson (Chairman); Jos Sclater (CEO)
- Products: Respiratory and Head Protection
- Revenue: ▲£353.7 million (2026)
- Operating income: ▲£47.8 million (2026)
- Net income: ▲£31.8 million (2026)
- Website: www.avon-technologiesplc.com

Avon Technologies plc is a British company that specialises in the engineering and manufacturing of respiratory protection equipment for military, law enforcement and fire personnel. Its corporate headquarters are 3 km (1.9 mi) south of Melksham in Wiltshire, England, at the Hampton Park West development. It is listed on the London Stock Exchange and is a constituent of the FTSE 250 Index.

== History ==
The business was established when a former cloth mill, known as Avon Mill, on the banks of the River Avon at Limpley Stoke in Wiltshire, was acquired by Messrs E G Browne and J C Margetson in 1885. The previous owners of the site had been timber merchants but had diversified into rubber goods.

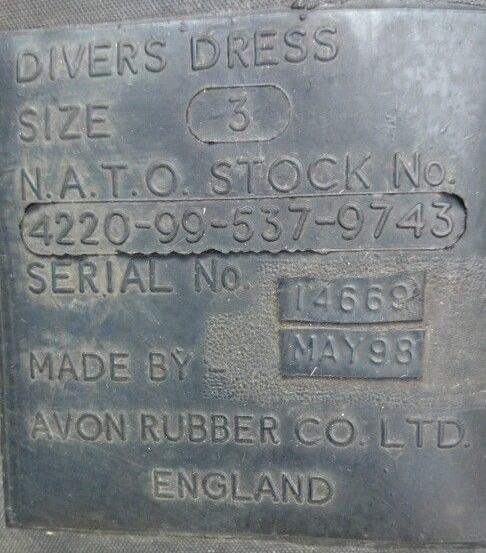
Avon military dry diving suit label

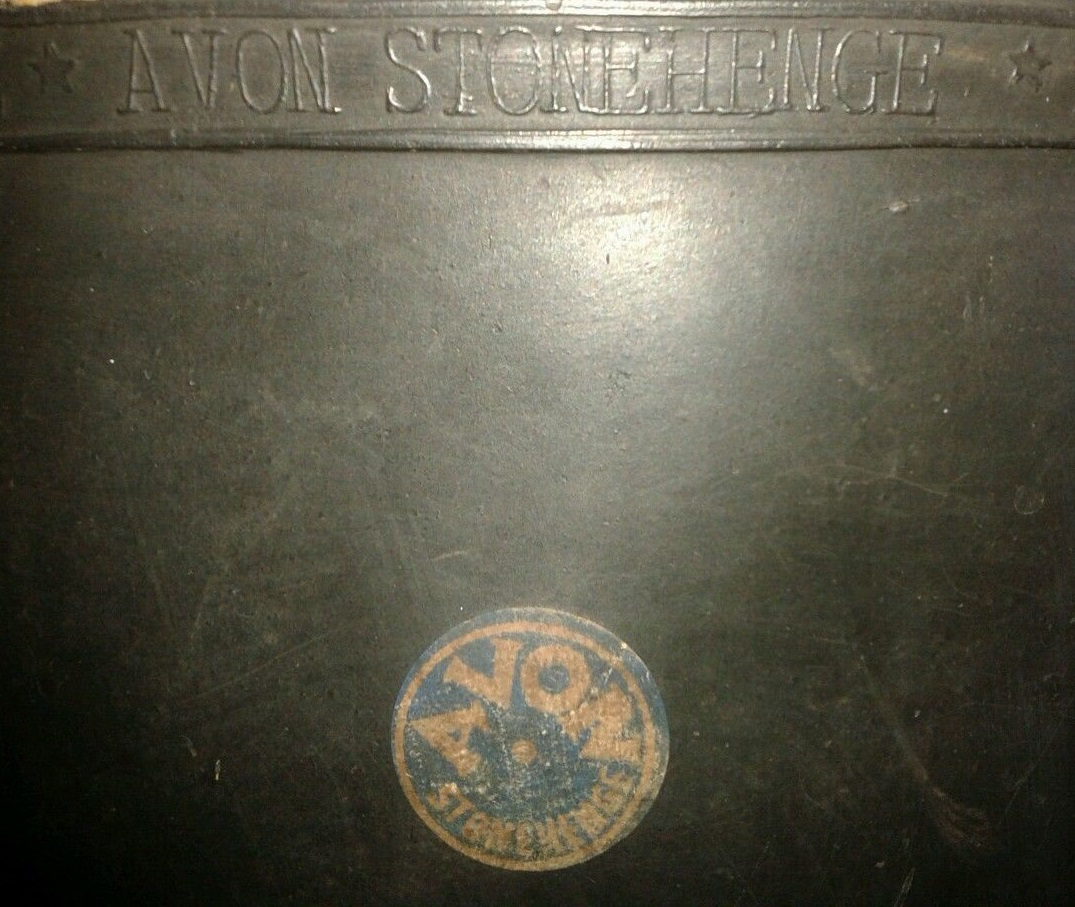
Avon Wellington boot markings

By 1890, the business had transferred to premises in Melksham and was named The Avon India Rubber Company Limited. Products at this time included solid tyres, conveyor belts and components for railways. By 1900, pneumatic tyres for bicycles were being produced, and by 1906 the first car tyres were advertised under the Avon brand. The company acquired the Sirdar Rubber Works at Greenland Mill in Bradford on Avon in 1915.

The company was floated on the London Stock Exchange in 1933. It acquired the rival company of George Spencer, Moulton & Co. in 1956, bringing with it Abbey Mills and Kingston Mills in Bradford on Avon, and a jointly owned plant in Paris. The company name was shortened to Avon Rubber in 1963.

In June 1958, an advertisement appeared in the British Sub-Aqua Club journal Triton to publicise the "Typhoon dry diving suit manufactured by the Avon India Rubber Co. Ltd. exclusively for E. T. Skinner Co. Ltd.". For many years, Avon Rubber also produced back-entry dry diving suits for military use. The company also moulded lined "Stonehenge" brand Wellington boots at a time when such footwear was manufactured by calendering or dipping processes.

Production started on a range of inflatable boats in 1959. In 1994 the Llanelli-based marine business Avon Inflatables was split-off and sold; it subsequently became a division of Zodiac Marine, France.

In 1997 the Avon Tyres business was sold to Cooper Tire & Rubber Company of Findlay, Ohio in the United States, leaving the company to concentrate on its core businesses of automotive components, technical products and protective equipment.

In March 2000, Avon moved its activities to a manufacturing and head office facility at Hampton Park West, south of Melksham.

M50 Joint Service General Purpose Mask made by Avon Technologies

In June 2005, Avon purchased International Safety Instruments, Inc., based in Lawrenceville, Georgia, USA. Avon-ISI is a manufacturer of self-contained breathing apparatus and thermal imaging systems for fire, law enforcement and industrial applications.

In August 2006, the Avon Automotive division was sold to a US-based management team and became a separate entity called Avon Automotive Holdings Inc.; this was the largest buy-out in the company's history. The aerosol division was sold for £1.75 million in March 2008 to Avon Group (an unrelated Bristol-based company), enabling Avon Rubber to concentrate on its core protective equipment, dairy and extrusions markets.

In November 2008, the mixing plant at Westbury was sold to ATR Compounding Ltd, a division of SPC UK, a compounder of rubber based in Whitby.

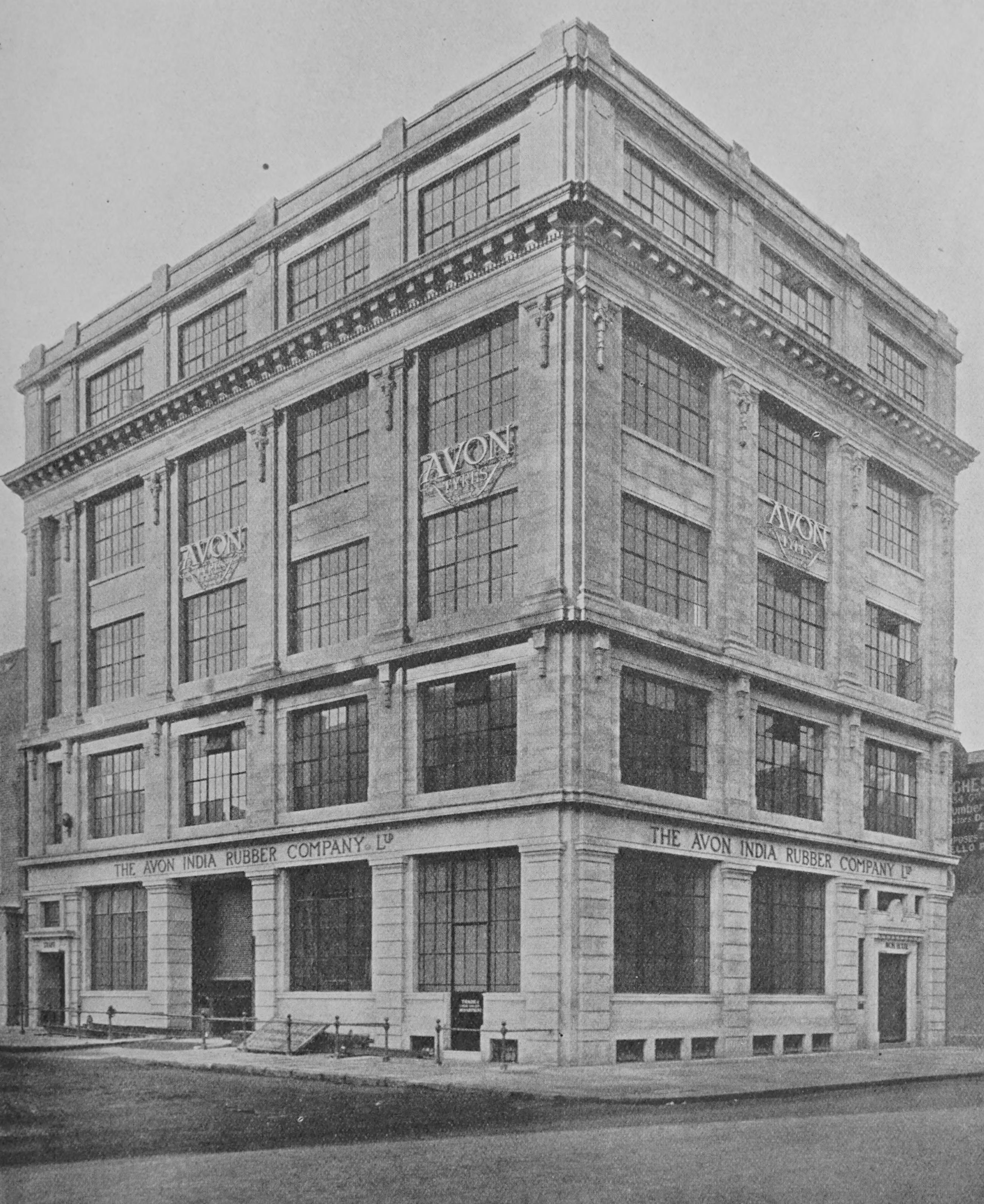
Avon House on Euston Road, designed by Robert Angell

The company, which had a long history of manufacturing respirators – including the S6 NBC Respirator, a gas mask used by the British armed forces from the 1960s, and the S10 from the 1980s – began to supply the M50 mask to United States forces in 2009.

In January 2020, Avon purchased Ceradyne, Inc.'s advanced ballistic protection business and the Ceradyne brand from 3M.

In September 2020, the company divested its milking equipment business, milkrite | InterPuls, to DeLaval for net proceeds of around £160 million. This enabled the company to concentrate on personal protection, both respiratory and ballistic, under the Avon Protection brand. Shortly after, they acquired Team Wendy, a maker of helmets for military and first responder use, for a reported $130 million.

The company changed its name from Avon Rubber to Avon Protection in July 2021.

In December 2021, the company announced it would be closing its body armour business after its bullet-proof vests failed US regulatory tests.

In April 2022 the company warned that the year's profits would miss City forecasts, leading to a share price drop of nearly 20 per cent over the course of a single day.

In August 2024 the company changed its name from Avon Protection to Avon Technologies.

In June 2025 the company was awarded a £10.2 million order from the Ministry of Defence to supply its NATO-standard FM50 respirators for Ukraine.

== Notable people ==
- Robert Fuller, son of George Pargiter Fuller, was managing director in 1927.
- Charles Floyd (1905–1971), was chairman from 1955 to 1968.
