= 1996 24 Hours of Le Mans =

64th 24 Hours of Le Mans endurance race

Previous: 1995	Next: 1997
Index: Races | Winners

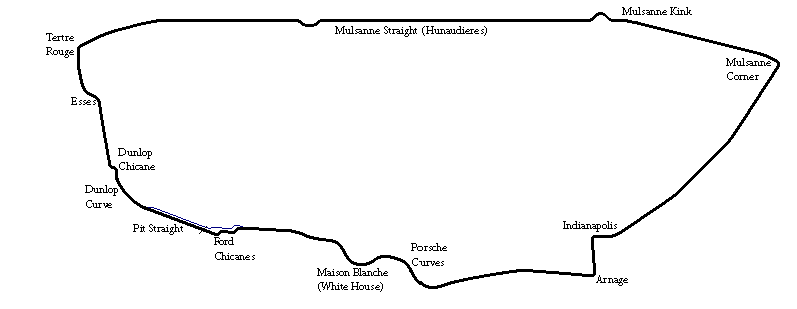
Le Mans in 1996

The 1996 24 Hours of Le Mans was the 64th Grand Prix of Endurance and took place on 15 and 16 June 1996. It was won by a Tom Walkinshaw-Porsche prototype run by Joest Racing with drivers Davy Jones, Manuel Reuter and Le Mans rookie Alexander Wurz. Like McLaren the year before, it won on its race debut, after tough competition from the works Porsche team and their own new design – the Porsche 911 GT1. Together, these two teams easily outpaced their rival prototypes and GT sports cars, leaving them in their wake. Evenly matched, in the end it came down to the metronomic reliability of the Joest car, and the drivers adhering to a steady schedule, that got the victory.

From the start it was the two TWR-Porsches and two works Porsches that set the pace, pulling away from the field. The expected challenges from the WSC Ferraris, the LMP1 Courages and the GT1 McLarens never eventuated as they fell away through mechanical troubles or off-track accidents. The only one to be close enough was the Gulf McLaren of team-owner Ray Bellm with James Weaver and 1995-winner JJ Lehto. They held down third place on Sunday morning, until forced to stop for a gearbox change. A strong weekend for Porsche was capped by the Roock Racing team comfortably winning the GT2 class on their Le Mans debut. Wurz, at 22 years of age, became the youngest ever overall winner of the Le Mans 24-Hours.

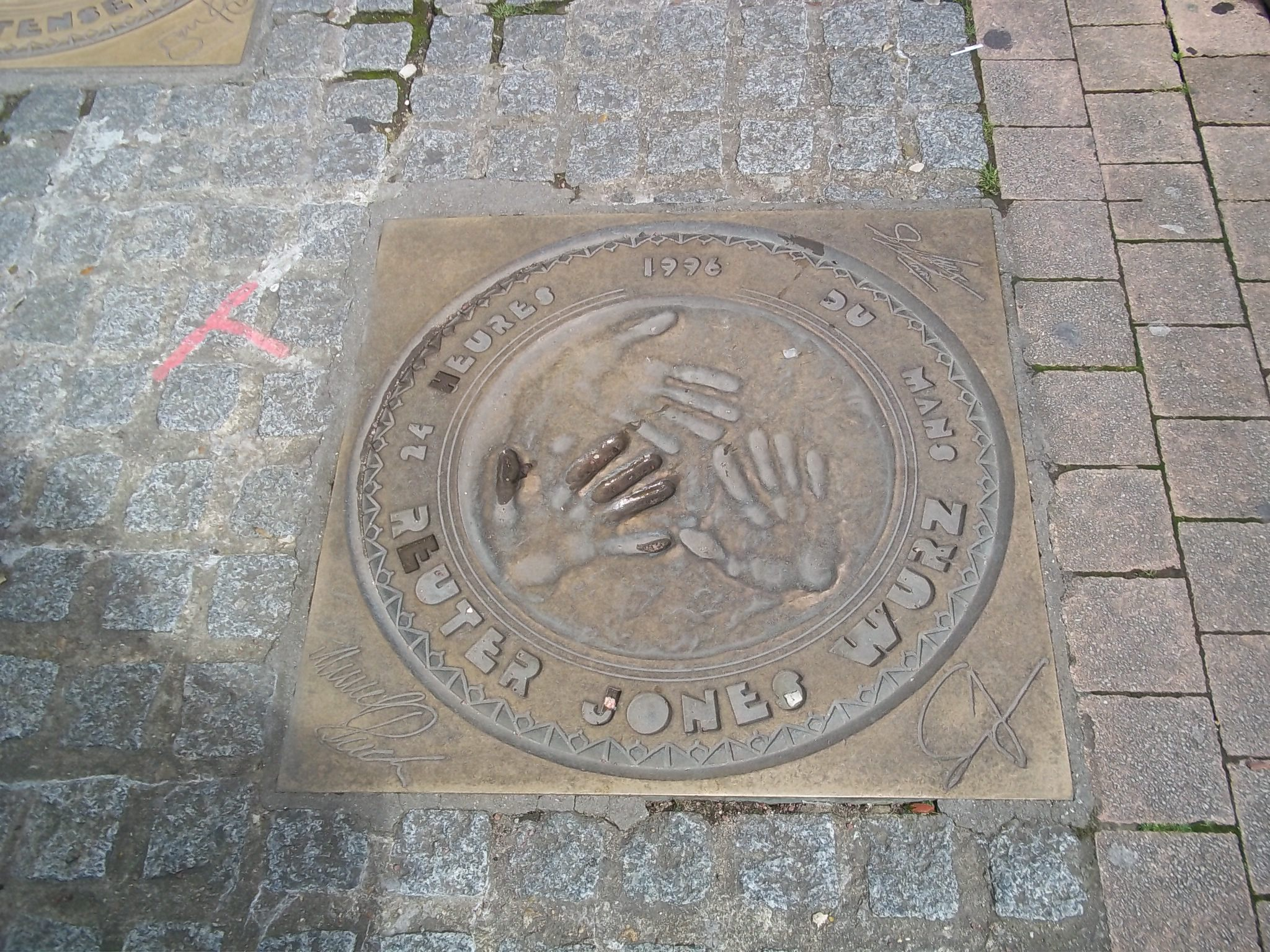
1996 victory plaque

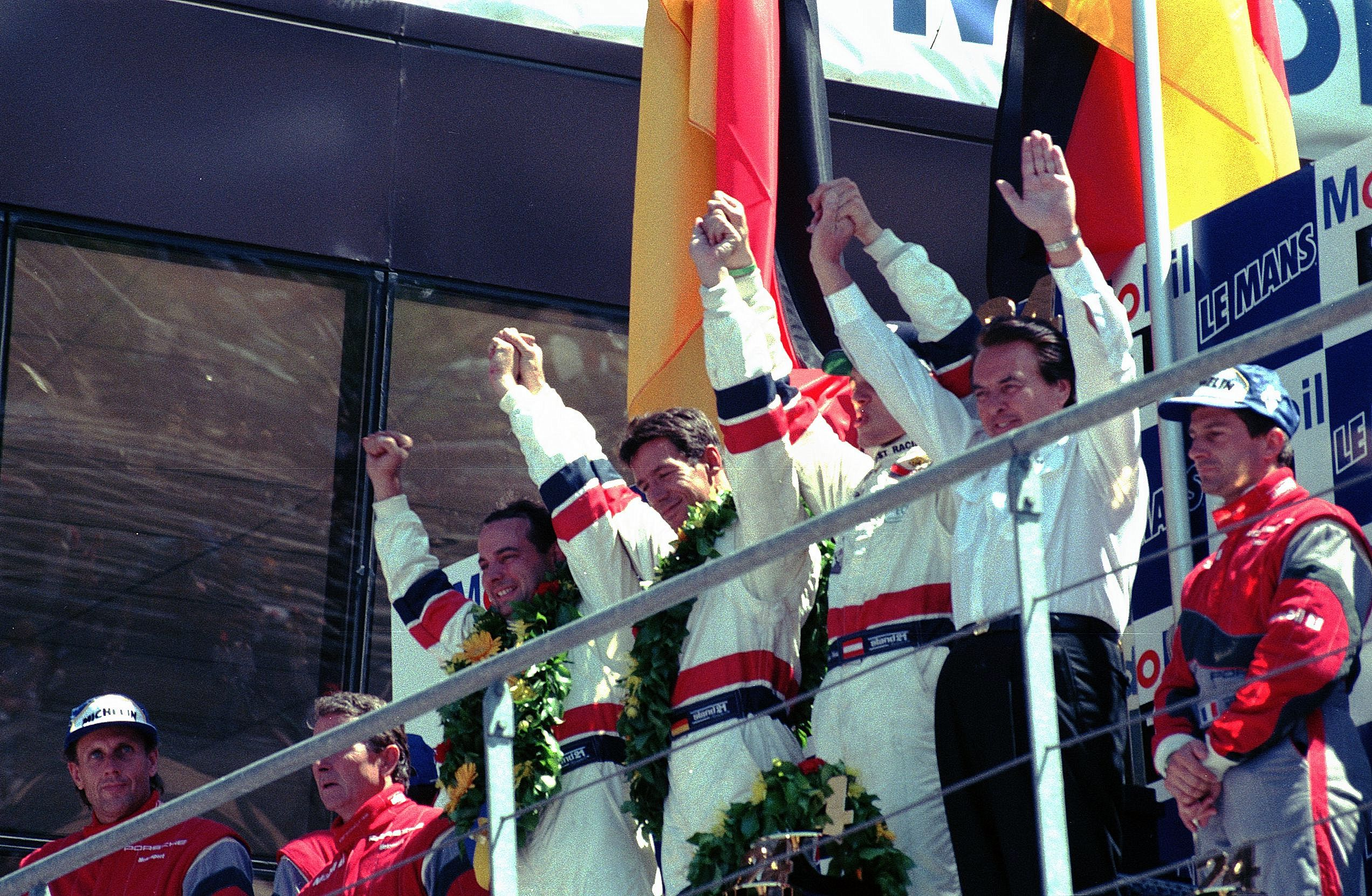
The winning drivers – Jones, Wurz, Reuter, with team manager Reinhold Joest

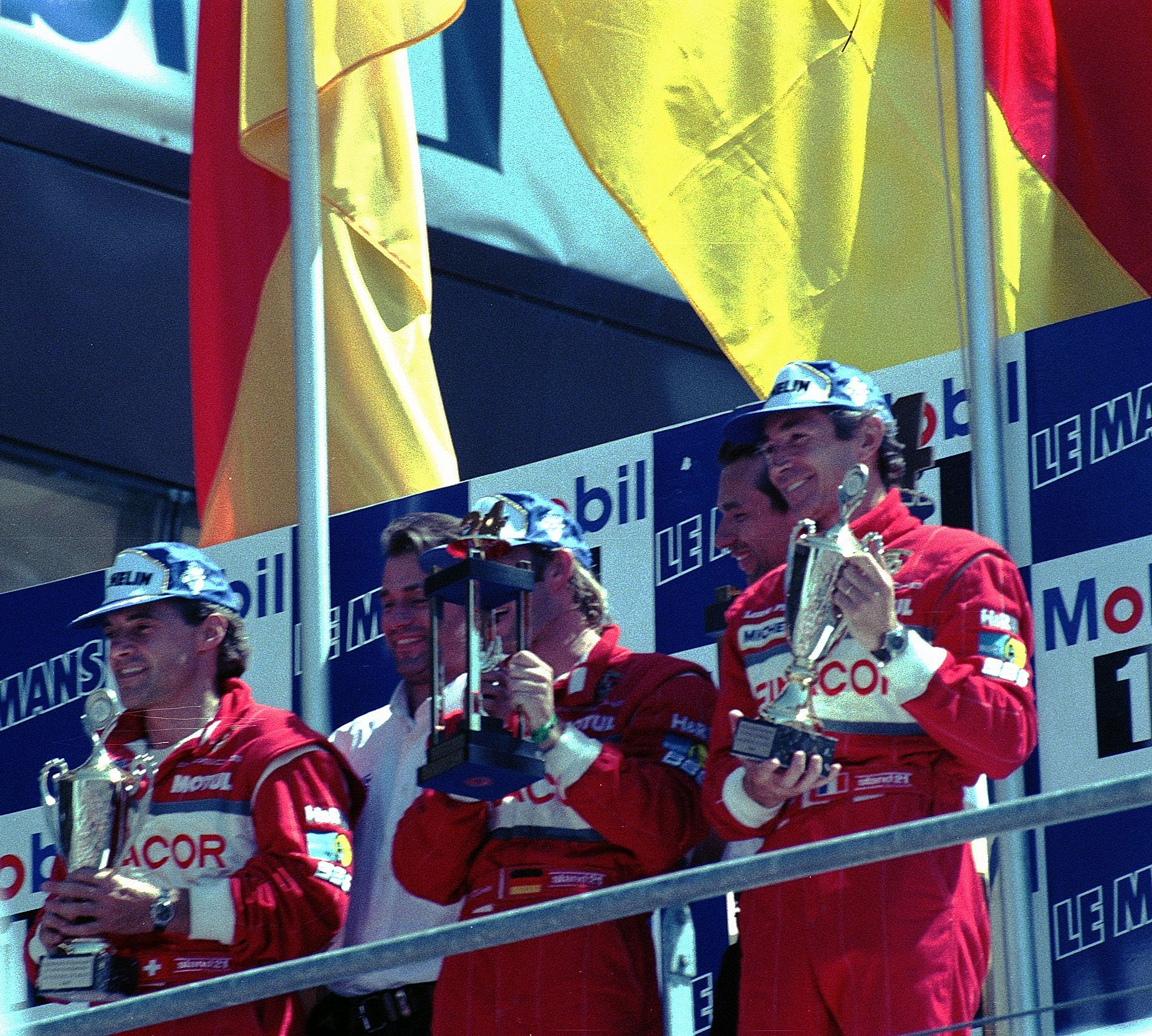
Winning drivers of GT2–Eichmann / Kelleners / Martinolle

== Regulations ==
The Automobile Club de l'Ouest (ACO) was still satisfied with its equivalency formulae between the prototypes and GTs. The only change was to include engine volume and turbo boost were added into its calculations (alongside weight, tank size, tyre width and air-inlet restrictors). Rather than modifying the American WSC regulations for their use, the ACO instead chose to rewrite its own prototype regulations, in parallel with the IMSA-WSC. They would be a minimum 875 kg, with a maximum 3.0-litre turbo or 5.1-litre regular engine.

In the GT classes, the FIA (Fédération Internationale de l'Automobile) had endorsed the success of the SRO series and produced an official set of regulations to lead into a formal FIA Championship in 1997 – albeit very liberal in application. Major engine modifications were now allowed in GT1, while GT2 still had to use series-production engines. More aerodynamic assistance was permitted, using carbon-fibre and other specialised materials although driver-aids were still very limited. In GT1, only 25 street-legal examples had to be built, although a “proof-of-concept” promissory was accepted.

A summary of the classes:

- LM P1/C90: min weight 875 kg, fuel tank 80L, with max 5.1L engine or 3.0L for turbos, max tyre width 16"
- LM P2: min weight 650 kg, fuel tank 62L, with max 3.4L (6-cyl) or 2.0L (4-cyl) for turbos, max tyre width 14"
- WSC: max 4.0L production engine, or 3.0L for turbos, with rev limit of 8500 rpm (for 2-valve V8) or 10500 rpm (for 4-valve V12), fuel tank 80L, minimum weight graded according to engine size and type, max tyre width 18"
- LM GT1 and GT2: minimum weight based on the ACO sliding scale, fuel tank 100L, with max 8.0L engine or 4.0L (turbo), max tyre width 14" (front) and 12” (rear). GT1 cars were allowed carbon-brakes while GT2 only had ferrous-brakes and the engine restriction cited above

The ACO now mandated that three drivers would have to qualify in each car. In an effort to throw the prototypes and GT1s into battle from the start, the ACO divided the grid into two halves. The left side would have the prototypes lined up in qualifying order, while on the righthand (pitward) side would be the GTs. Also, to accommodate the thousands of British fans, this year the race would start at 3pm to fit the TV scheduling broadcasting the England-Scotland football match at the Euro championships.

== Entries ==
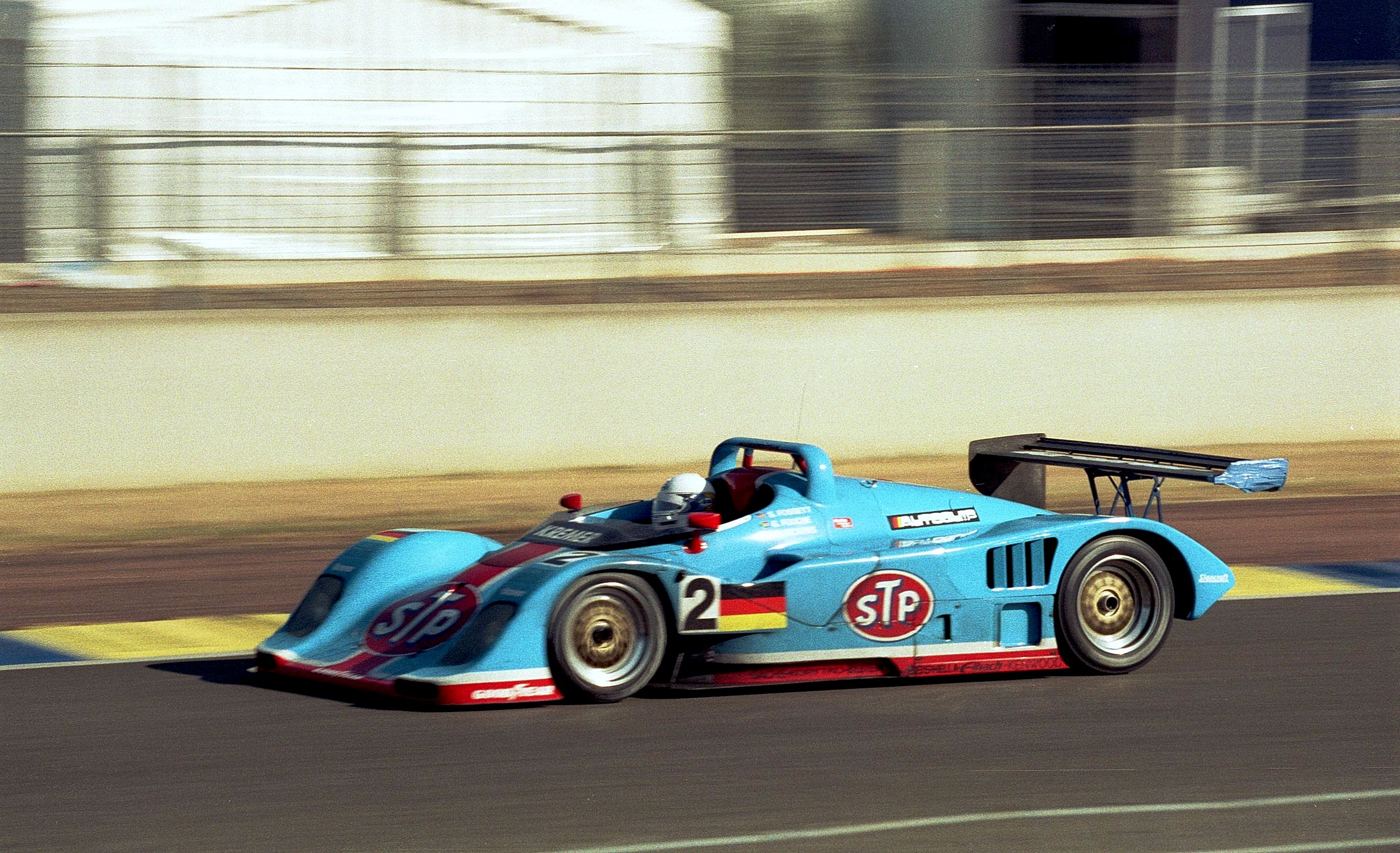
Kremer K8

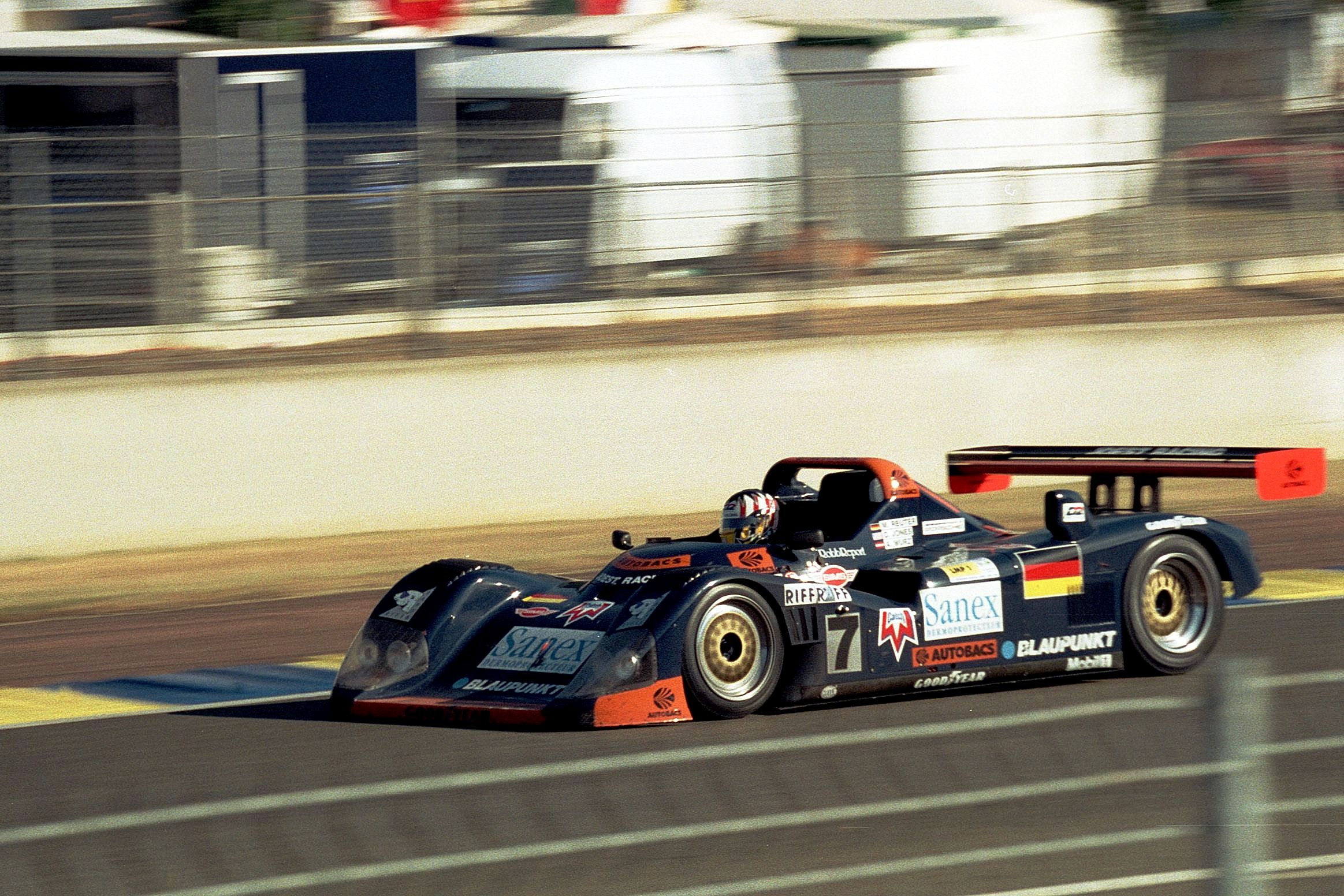
TWR-Porsche

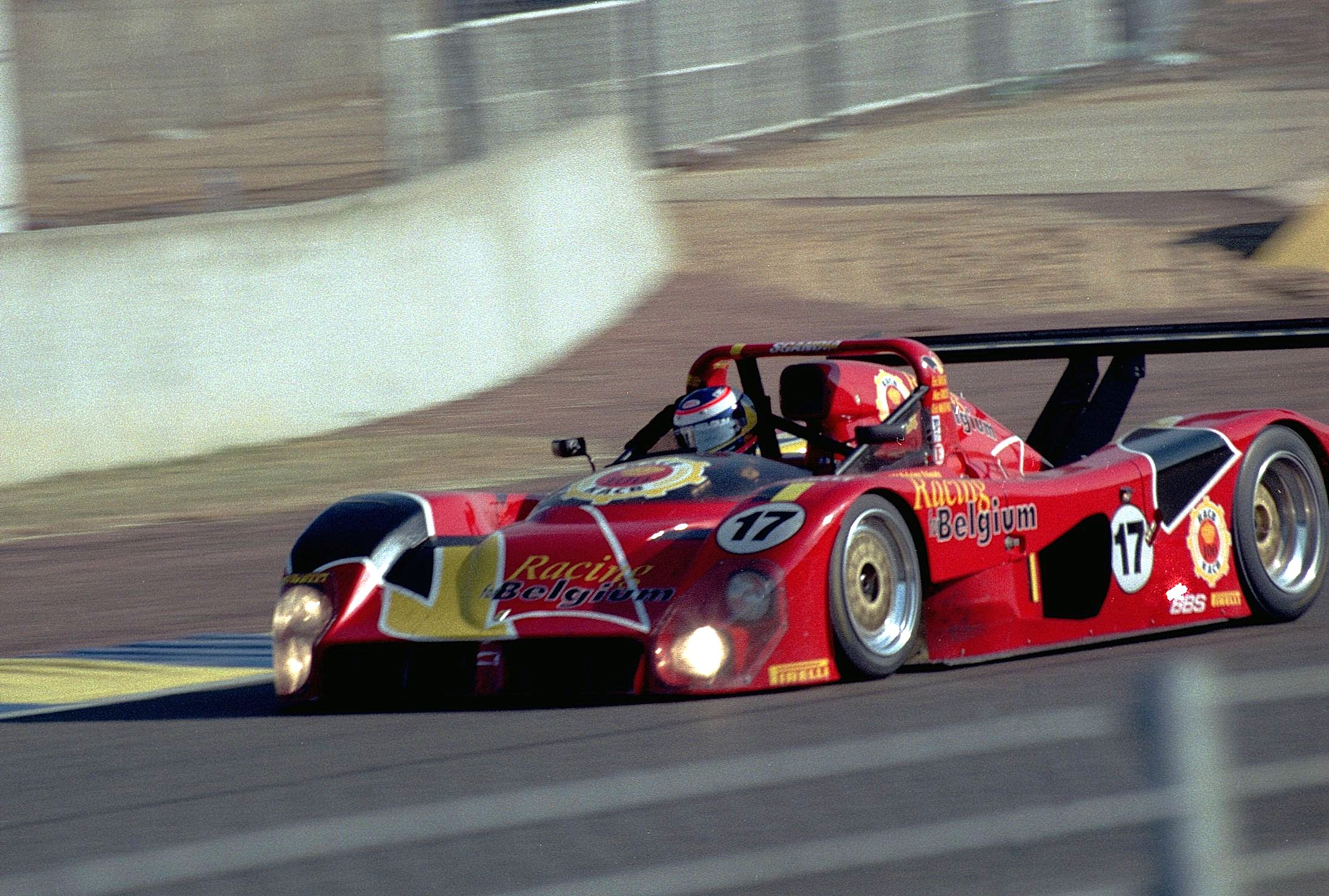
Ferrari 333 SP

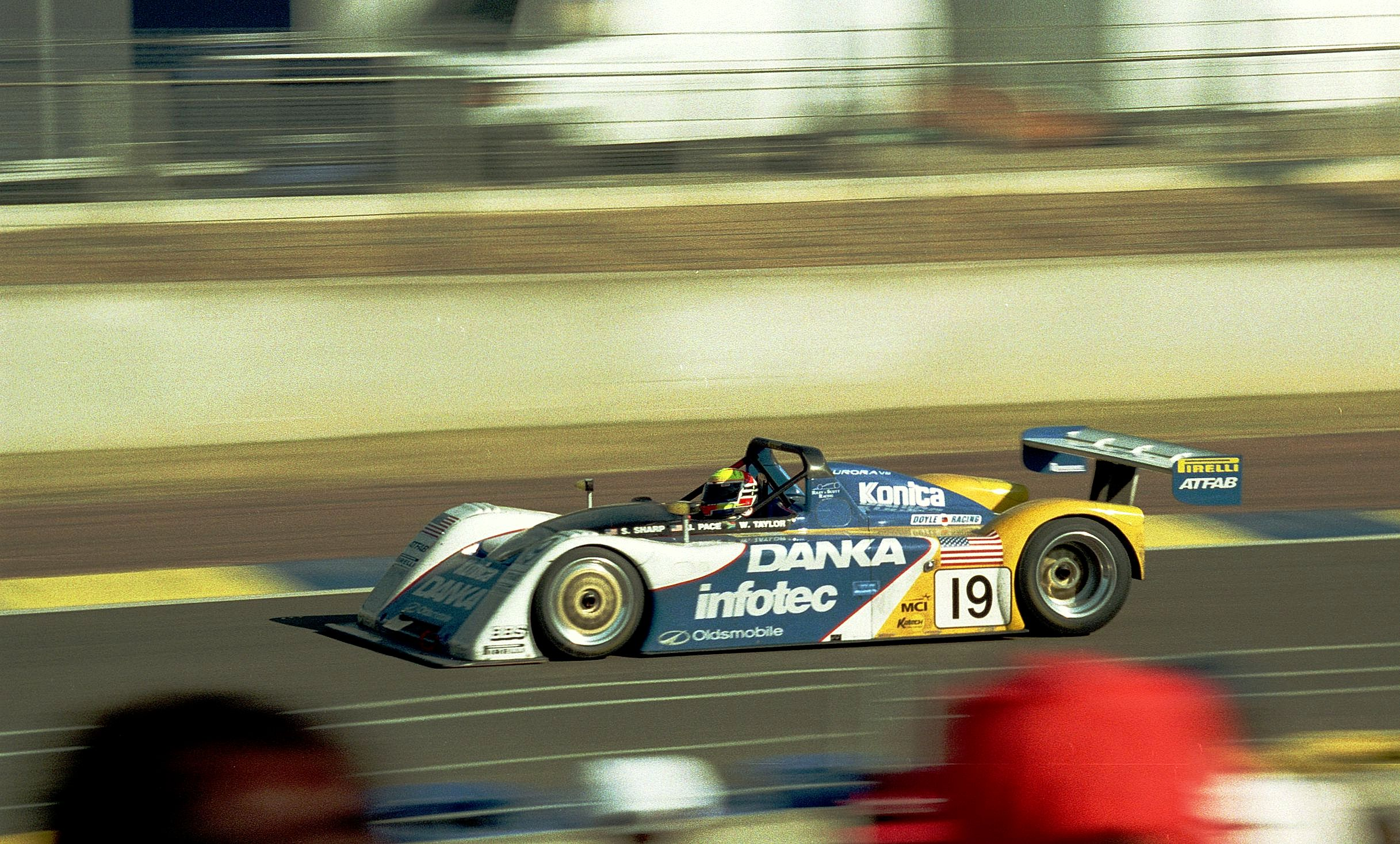
Riley & Scott Mk III

After introducing them the year before, the ACO halved the number of automatic entries from 20 to 10. They received 107 applications, of which 76 were accepted and therefore 66 had to go to the Pre-Qualifying session at the end of April, from which the remaining 38 starters would be selected with five Reserves. The ongoing strength of the BPR Global series, and the lack of organised sports car racing meant the race-week entry was stacked with GT cars: 39 of them versus only 14 prototypes - which included only three WSCs from the IMSA series, which was leading that revival of Sports Cars. Two new manufacturers joined the packed GT1 field – from the USA came Chrysler with its Viper muscle-car and its hefty 8-litre engine. Then there was Porsche's response to the McLaren F1, the 911 GT1. Journalists were picking the 1996 race as one of the most open in many years.

Class	Quantity	Turbo and Rotary engines
LM-P1/C90	7 / 7	7 / 7
LM-P2	4 / 3	4 / 3
IMSA-WSC	3 / 3	0 / 0
LM-GT1	27 / 25	15 / 13
LM-GT2	11 / 10	8 / 7
Total Entries	52 / 48	34 / 30

- Note: The first number is the number that pre-qualified, the second the number who started.

=== LM-P1 ===
After their strong race the previous year, Courage Compétition was again a strong chance for the outright victory. The C41 WSC project was abandoned and three of the new C36 spyders were entered as yet another development of the Group C-based C30 model. Now fitted carbon brakes, it needed revised suspension and cooling ducts. Minor aerodynamic changes included a reshaped rear wing. The new regulations docked about 80 bhp on turbo cars, limiting the 3-litre Porsche flat-6 engine to 520 bhp. Mario Andretti returned for another shot at the Triple Crown, in an all-star car, with former winners Jan Lammers (1988) and Derek Warwick (1992). The second car, which had finished second the year before, had the all-French line-up of Philippe Alliot, Didier Cottaz and Jérôme Policand. The third car was sponsored by Elf La Filière, who ran the new motorsport academy based at the Le Mans Technoparc. It also had a very experienced driver line-up, with the indomitable Henri Pescarolo, back for his 30th start, alongside Franck Lagorce and Emmanuel Collard, neither of whom had been born when Henri started his Le Mans saga.

Kremer Racing wheeled out its increasingly old-fashioned K8 Spyders including a newly built chassis. The new regulations had trimmed the power output to 530 bhp. Revised ducting underneath was done to improve cooling, and 30 kg was shed. Christophe Bouchut was part of the Kremer team's regular GT2 line-up and was given the new chassis, with Jürgen Lässig and Harri Toivonen and the older one had 1989-winner Stanley Dickens, George Fouché and adventurer Steve Fossett.

The third make in the class was a unique co-operation between two erstwhile rivals. Tom Walkinshaw's TWR team had run the Jaguar works effort in the Group C era, winning in 1988 and 1990. In 1991, the team won the Teams' and Drivers' World Championship with the Ross Brawn-designed Jaguar XJR-14. TWR still had one roadworthy example of the three chassis built in their American base, left after the 1992 IMSA series. The team looked at the WSC regulations and were keen to adapt the XJR-14 for the series but were without a suitable engine. When IMSA announced turbos would be allowed for the 1995 season, Walkinshaw approached Alwin Springer, head of Porsche North America, and a deal was agreed. Porsche would supply engine, powertrain and expertise to run the three big enduros: Daytona, Sebring and Le Mans to take on the new Ferraris. But when IMSA abruptly announced a 100 lb ballast increase to turbo-cars barely a fortnight before the 1995 Daytona race, Porsche withdrew their entries, and the project petered out. A year later, Reinhold Joest contacted Porsche about picking up their part in the partnership, to run the TWR-Porsches. This suited the company, allowing them to focus solely on their GT1 cars.

The original Jaguar engine was replaced with the indefatigable Porsche 3.0-litre water-cooled, twin-turbo, straight-six engine, and a new transmission casing for the 5-speed Porsche gearbox. As load-bearing components, the rear suspension also had to be redesigned, while the conversion from a close-top to open-top meant a sturdy rollbar and engine airbox (offset to the left to not be restricted by the driver's head). The bodyshell aerodynamics were revamped to account for the open-top With four of the Porsche works drivers now unavailable, Joest assembled a new team for the two cars: the original chassis was run by American Davy Jones (a former TWR works-driver), 1989 Le Mans winner Manuel Reuter and 22 year-old rookie Alexander Wurz; while the new car had the experience of Formula 1 drivers Michele Alboreto and Pierluigi Martini and touring-car veteran Didier Theys.

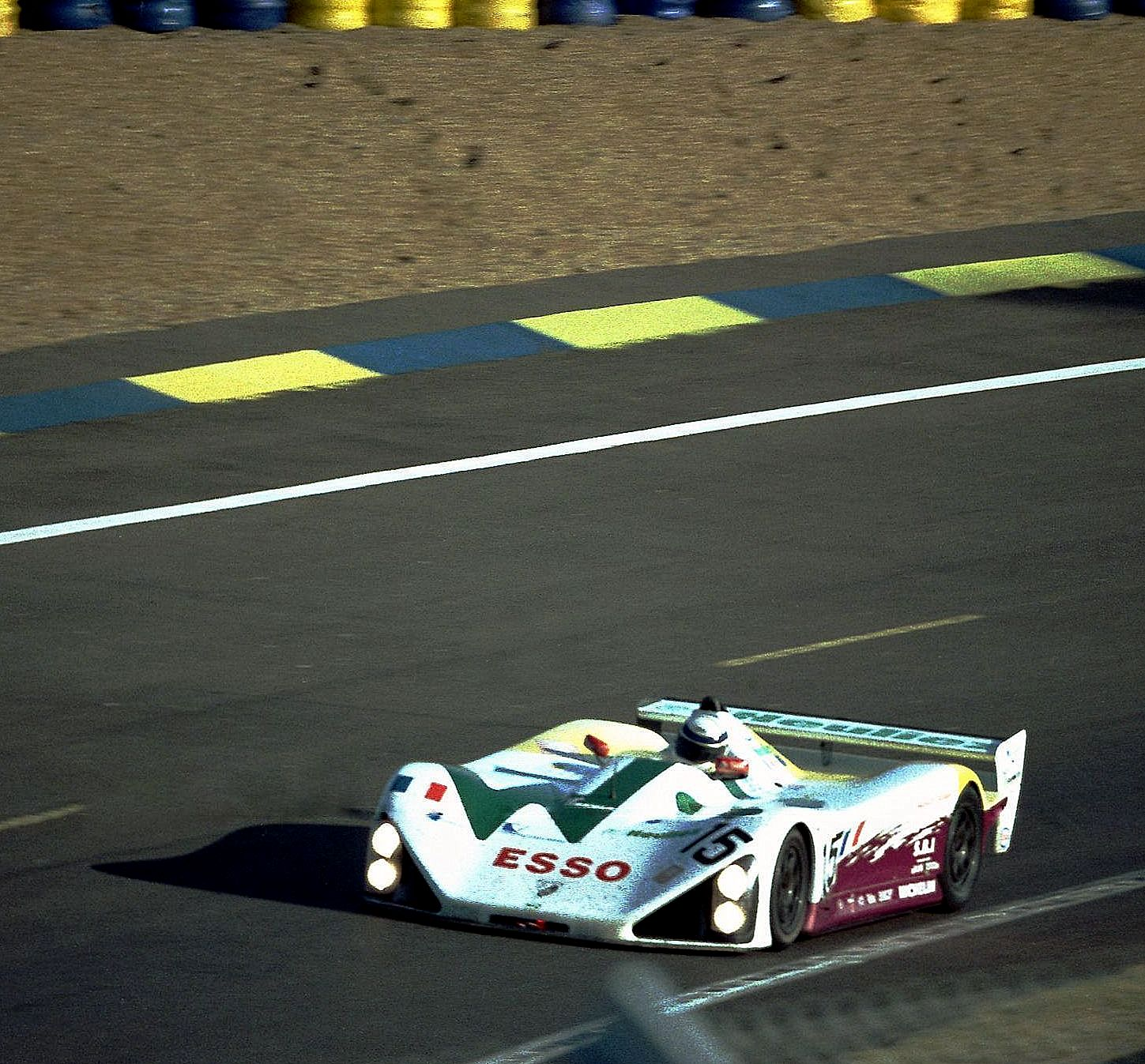
WR LM96 single-seater

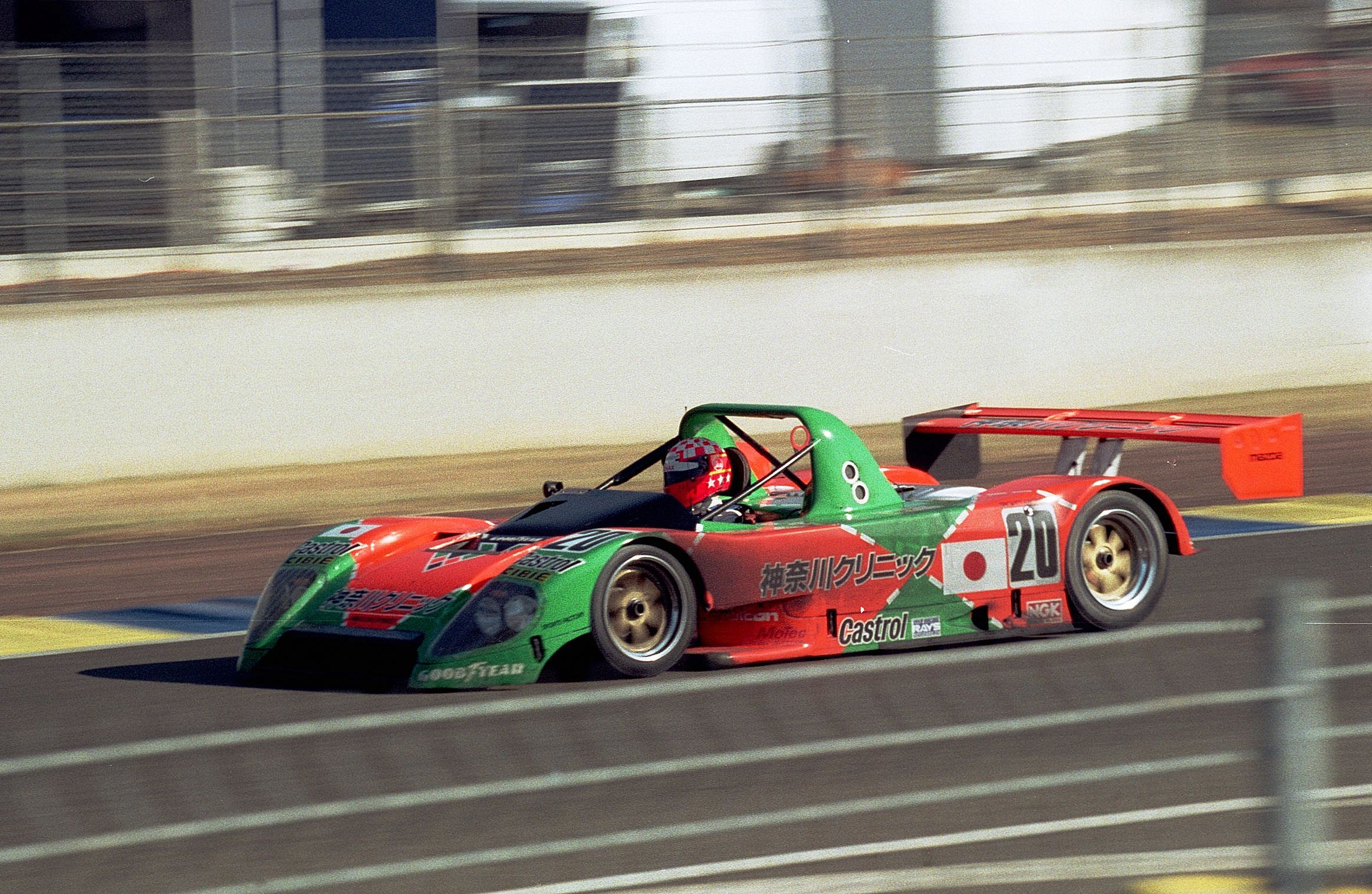
Kudzu DLM

=== IMSA-WSC ===
The Ferrari 333 SP cars returned to Le Mans after an underwhelming debut in 1995. Andy Evans brought his two Scandia Engineering cars from the IMSA series, leasing one to Pascal Witmeur for his “Racing for Belgium” children's charity team. Evans had brought in Tony Southgate, who had worked on the original project at Ferrari, to develop the car. Now having to run with air restrictors, the airflow and aerodynamics were redesigned. All of these reduced downforce, but the reduced drag did increase the top speed by 30 kph up to 330 kph (205 mph). Things were looking much improved at Pre-qualifying, with Eric van der Poele topping the time-charts in both cars. Come race week, the cars arrived with new bodyshells fresh from Dallara. For Le Mans, Evans raced with Fermin Velez and Yvan Muller. The second car was sponsored by 1001 Belgians to raise money for children and had an experienced, all-Belgian line-up – van der Poele with single-seat drivers Eric Bachelart and Marc Goossens.

Ferraris main rival in the IMSA series came from the Riley & Scott Mk III, which had shown its endurance credentials this season by winning both the Daytona and Sebring races with Doyle Racing. Ironically, Eric van der Poele was a part of the winning crew at Sebring. A works effort, with the Doyle Racing team, came to Le Mans looking for its own unique Triple Crown. The first Riley & Scott model had appeared in 1990, and the Mk 3 arrived in 1995 (the Mk 2 being a road car). Built on a tubular frame, the carbon/kevlar chassis was tested at the Lockheed wind-tunnel. Fitted with the innovative “Riley Rocker” suspension, the engine bay was set up to accept any stock engine unit. Success this year was coming with the racing version of the Oldsmobile Aurora engine – a 32-valve 4.0-litre V8. Limited to a maximum of 10500rpm by IMSA regulations, it could put out 550 bhp. ACO rules dictated the WSC cars had to run ferrous brakes. The works team used the winning drivers from the Daytona 24 Hours: South African Wayne Taylor, IndyCar driver Scott Sharp and Jim Pace.

=== LM-P2 ===
The new ACO regulations coming into effect in 1997 would require all LMP cars to be 2-seaters. Rendered obsolete, this would be the last hurrah for the innovative Welter Racing. The small French team had locked out the front row of the grid in 1996, but the latest regulations added 30 kg to the minimum weight (up to 620 kg), an imposed turbo-boost limit and smaller air-restrictors all meant that feat would not be repeated. A new chassis was built, and two of the older ones were prepared. However, only the LM96 got through Pre-Qualifying, but only when Patrick Gonin put in a final effort at the end. William David crashed at Tertre Rouge, and with misfortune collided with the third WR that was parked there, wrecking both cars. David's earlier lap-times got him on the reserve list once the car was repaired.

The WR's perennial competition in LM P2 came from Didier Bonnet's Deboras. the new model was the LMP296. The new regulations now allowed the LM P2s to have a full overhanging rear wing, and with that installed the aerodynamics were notably improved. However, the engine limitations only allowed the 2.0-litre Cosworth turbo to reach 360 bhp. Bonnet entered two cars, one of which was granted automatic entry from the ACO, however the second failed to pass Pre-Qualifying, even though it had lapped 4 seconds faster than the previous model.

Jim Downing returned with an automatic entry from the ACO with his Kudzu-Mazda from the IMSA series. His new car, the Kudzu DLM, was the 7th chassis the team had built. They also developed their own intake system to combat the tighter air restrictors on the three-rotor Mazda rotary. Power was down to an equivalent of 400 bhp, but revised aerodynamics and a carbon hull made the chassis 90 kg lighter and almost 6 seconds faster than the previous model. Again, with full works support from Mazdaspeed, Downing kept the same driver line-up as the previous year, with Yojiro Terada and Franck Fréon.

=== LM GT1 ===
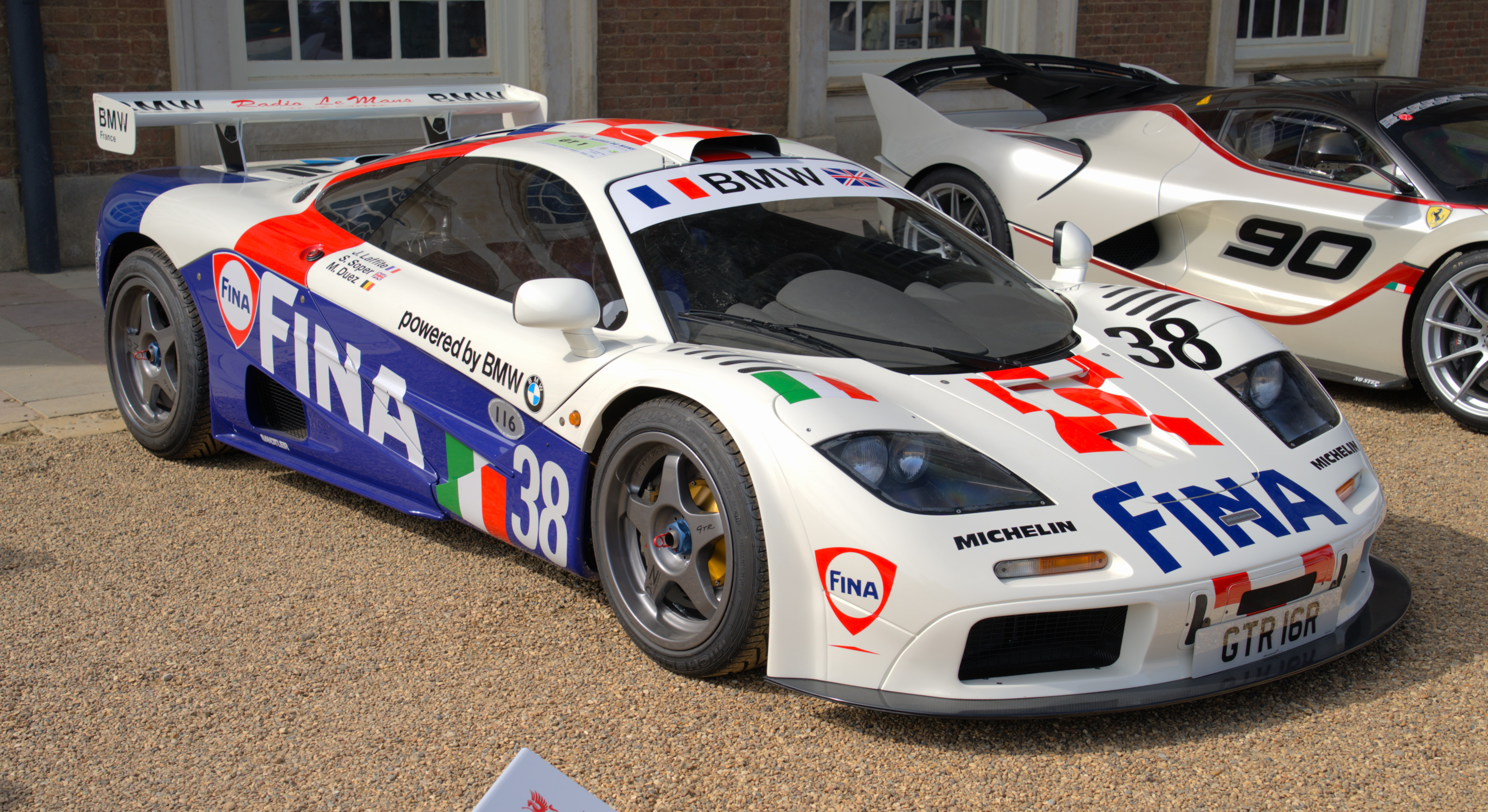
Bigazzi team McLaren F1 GTR

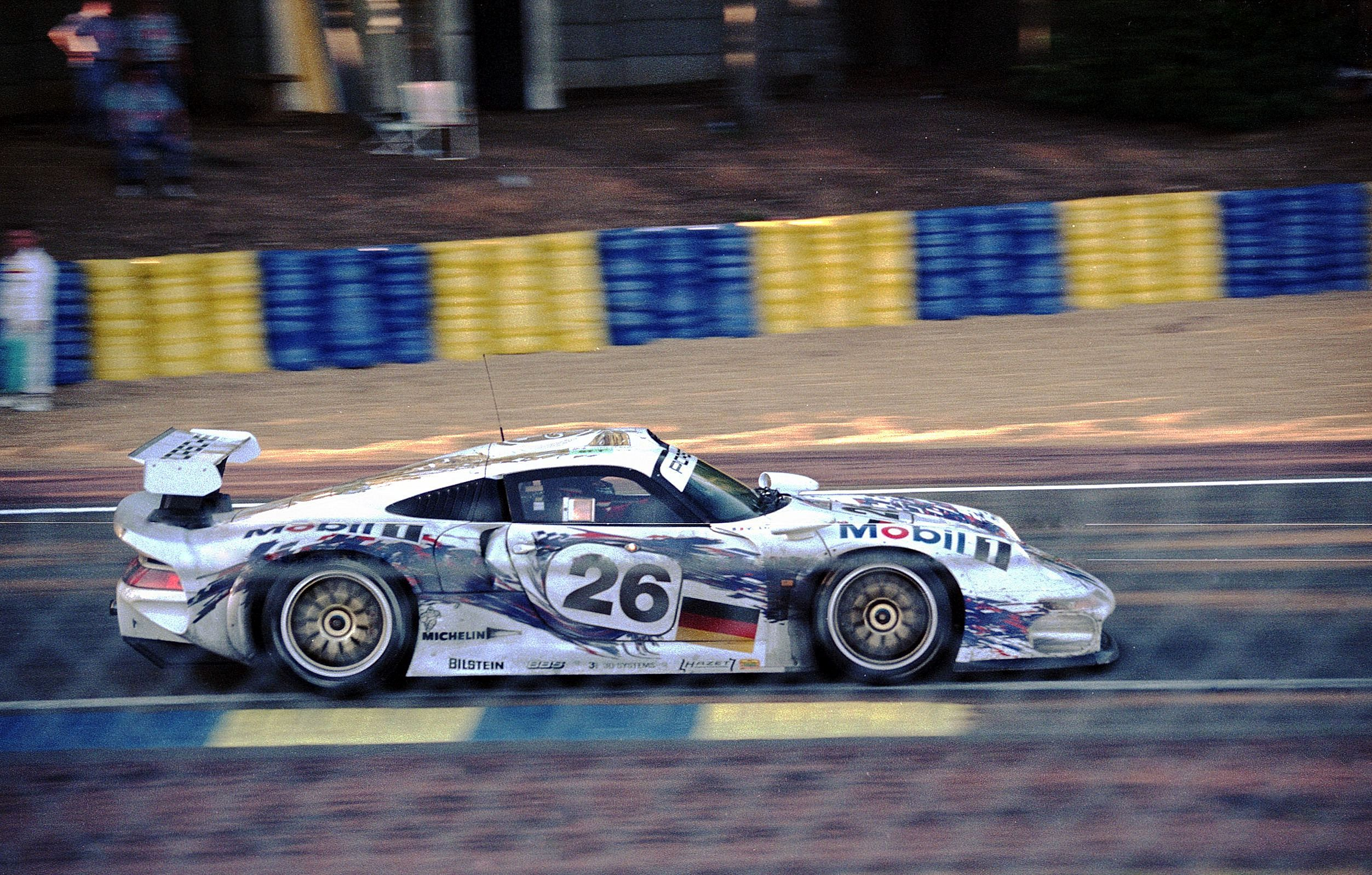
Porsche 911 GT1

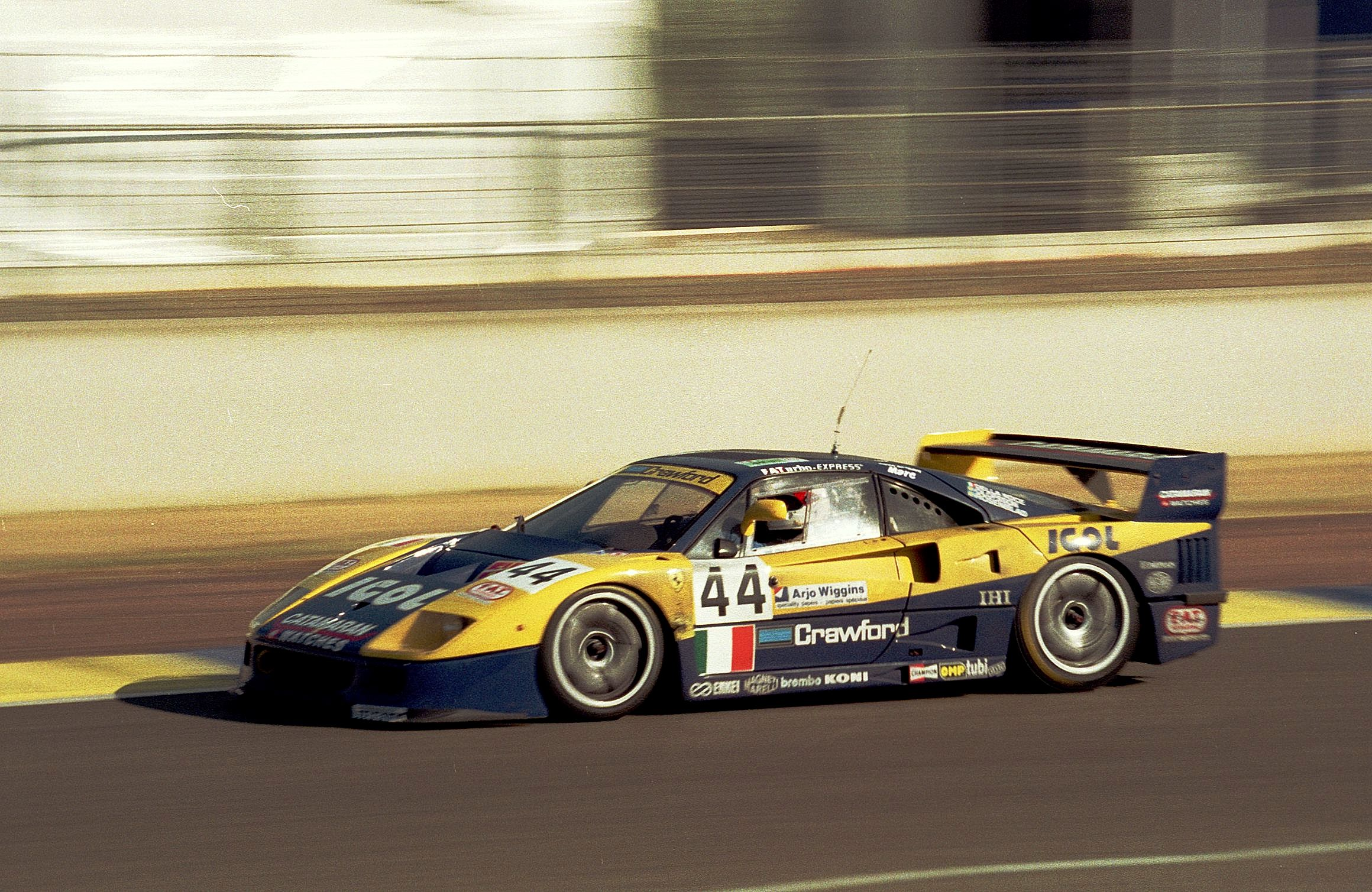
Igol-Ennea team Ferrari F40 GT Evo

McLaren Cars Motorsport started work on the next version of their dominant F1 GTR a month after their 1995 victory. The engine was placed lower in the chassis and the suspension, steering, braking and cooling all upgraded. The front and rear were extended with better aerodynamics. Overall, around 70 kg had been pared off the weight. Meanwhile, the MCM engine team, under Paul Rosche, facing tighter air restrictors fine-tuned the BMW engine such that the power-loss was limited to only 40 bhp, down to about 600 bhp. Top speed was 330 kph (205 mph). Nine new chassis were built, including another test vehicle. Ray Bellm and Lindsay Owen-Jones bought a pair for their Gulf Racing team, another pair went to the new Japanese Team Goh Motorsports, while Fabian Giroix got one for his BBA Compétition. BMW Motorsport also bought three of the cars for their semi-works customer, the Italian Bigazzi team, that had extensive experience in touring cars including four wins at the Spa 24-hours. Dutch banker Thomas Bscher got his two 1995 chassis upgraded to the 1996-spec by his engineering partners, David Price Racing. In the BPR Global series, the McLarens picked up where they left off in 1994 and won all four of the opening rounds leading up to Le Mans. For the big race, seven of the cars would line up. Ray Bellm and James Weaver had won two of the races and were joined by last year's sensation, Finn JJ Lehto. Regular series-drivers Owen-Jones and Pierre-Henri Raphanel had the second car, with David Brabham. Bscher raced with John Nielsen, and Dutchman Peter Kox as third driver. Andy Wallace and Derek Bell returned to race together in the Harrods car, with Wallace's BPR teammate Olivier Grouillard. The DPR cars had won the other two BPR races, one apiece. Two of the FINA-sponsored Team Bigazzi cars were entered. One driven by team-regulars Steve Soper and Marc Duez, with F1 veteran Jacques Laffite for BMW Europe; while the other car (owned by BMW North America) had Johnny Cecotto, Danny Sullivan and 3-time F1 World Champion Nelson Piquet having his first run at Le Mans. The final McLaren was its automatic entry from winning the previous year, which they gave (albeit still under the “Kokusai Kaihatsu” name) to Fabien Giroix and his BBA Compétition team. After the Pre-qualifying they were left on the Reserves list but came into the race after other entrants fell away.

But perhaps, as might be expected, the big news was with Porsche and the new 911 GT1 - yet again courting controversy. This was, quite literally, virtually a Porsche 911 in name only, with the visual similarity of a squashed, lengthened 911. Herbert Ampferer, new head of Porsche Motorsport, initiated the project just after McLaren's 1995 Le Mans victory. It was the company's first ever mid-engined car, and also their first fully water-cooled engine. The purpose-designed 3.2L 24-valve, flat-six was fitted with twin-KKK (Kühnle, Kopp & Kausch) turbos that could put out 590 bhp. That power went through a new 6-speed sequential gearbox and had carbon-ABS brakes. The first chassis was ready in mid-March and arrived unpainted in April for the Pre-Qualifying. Almost 7000 miles were covered in track- and endurance-testing before race-week. With only two road-going cars, it got EU GT1 homologation (again, like the Dauer-Porsche of 1994, using the "promised-production" clause). The re-formed works racing team pulled in some of the best endurance drivers with Hans-Joachim Stuck, Thierry Boutsen and Bob Wollek in one car and Karl Wendlinger with Scott Goodyear alongside last year's winner Yannick Dalmas. Goodyear was coming back to racing after a bad accident at the Brazilian CART round in March. Although now technically obsolete, there were three teams who entered their 911 GT2 Evo cars. Jack Leconte's Larbre Compétition prepared and ran the Porsche of Jean-Luc Chéreau. For the third year in a row, Leconte and Chéreau were joined by French regular Pierre Yver. Franz Konrad and Bob Wollek had been quite successful in the BPR series, with a 4th and 6th place in the first four races. With Wollek seconded to the Porsche works team, Konrad brought in Brazilian Antônio Hermann de Azevedo and German rookie Wido Rössler. Roock Racing has proven success in German GT racing since starting in 1990, with two championships to their name. They now stepped up with three cars to the BPR series in both GT1 and GT2 classes with 1970s F1 driver Jean-Pierre Jarier leading the GT1 team.

Four Ferrari F40s arrived at Le Mans this year, with three from the Italian Ferrari-owners Club. Their Igol-Ennea SRO team had the latest spec version of the GT Evoluzione, now with a 3.6-litre engine that could make 640 bhp and carbon/ceramic brakes. Team-owner Luciano Della Noce again raced with Anders Olofsson, along with Carl Rosenblad. The second car had the experienced single-seater drivers of Frenchmen Jean-Marc Gounon, Éric Bernard and Paul Belmondo. FCI also entered a third less-modified 3.5-litre GTE while the fourth car was from the Pilot Racing team of Stéphane Ratel (the “SR” of “SRO”). This was an F40 LM, led by the experienced Michel Ferté. After an unspectacular debut in 1995, the NISMO works racing team returned with an improved Nissan Skyline – the GT-R LM. Now bored out to 2.8-litres and mounted a bit lower and further back, the twin-turbo was developed to put out 600 bhp. Weight savings dropped 40 kg and pre-testing found them to be 10 seconds faster than the previous year. The team was also the first to equip its cars with a GPS device. Once again, two cars were entered with an all-Japanese line-up: Toshio Suzuki and Kazuyoshi Hoshino this year raced with Masahiro Hasemi, while Masahiko Kondo raced with Aguri Suzuki (back for the first time since his big Toyota crash in 1991) and Masahiko Kageyama (the only Le Mans rookie in the squad).

Toyota had done a major update of its Toyota Supra for the All-Japan GT championship. The engines were trimmed to 2-litre, however a 1-off special was built for Shin Kato's SARD team to take to Le Mans. Regulations limited its power to 600 bhp. It was fitted with a new 6-speed sequential gearbox and by using carbon/kevlar panels it was 100 kg than its 1995 predecessor. This year, the team had the services of 1995 race-winner Masanori Sekiya with experienced Japanese single-seater drivers Hidetoshi Mitsusada and Masami Kageyama. Once again, the team brought their SARD MC8-R based on the Toyota MR2. Extensive work took 210 kg off the chassis, mainly from using thinner sheet steel and a lighter transmission unit. This, in turn, required smaller air-filters on the 4-litre Lexus V8 to limit it to 600 bhp. Alain Ferté was back as lead-driver, with Mauro Martini who drove the team's Supra the previous year and had finished second overall in 1994 in the SARD Toyota 94C.

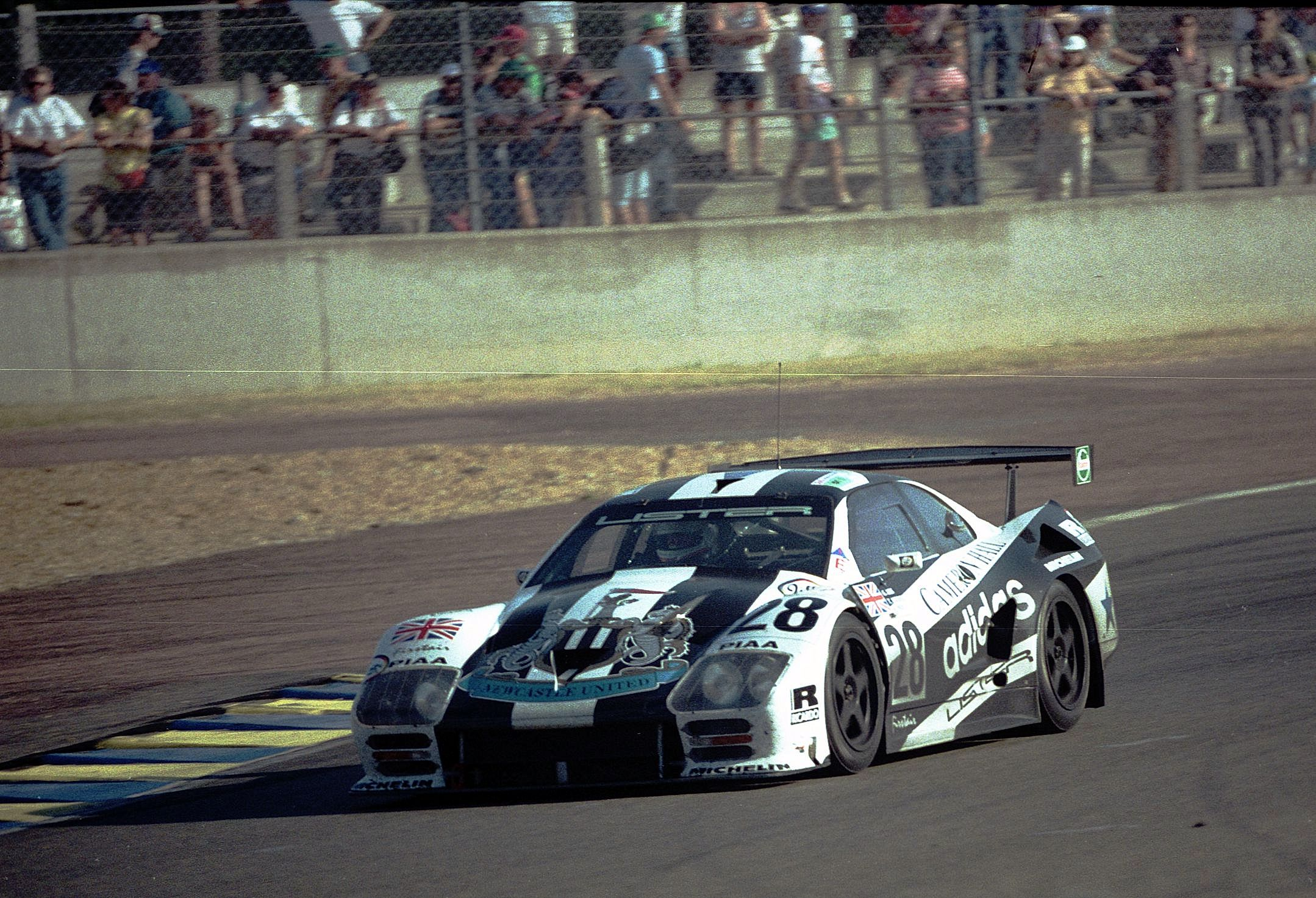
Distinctive livery of the Lister Storm

Lister returned with a refined version of their Lister Storm: the GTL. Ex-TWR Jaguar designer Tony Southgate had been brought in to work on updating the car. To improve the weight distribution, the big front-mounted 7.0-litre V12 was moved 6” back, the gearbox was installed transversely with the rear axle and the team managed to trim 100 kg of weight. Although the first chassis was wrecked in a big accident at Daytona, the replacement was another 45 kg lighter and lapped 12 seconds faster at Pre-Qualifying than the GTS did in 1995. The car arrived in the striking black-&-white livery of their surprise sponsor – the Newcastle United Football Club. Geoff Lees was lead driver again, joined by Tiff Needell and Anthony Reid, who had finished third together in 1990 with a Japanese-entered Porsche 962. After a positive showing in 1994 by French privateers, Chrysler was convinced to make a concerted effort for GT victory at Le Mans. Revised from the floor up, the new Dodge Viper GTS-R (called a Chrysler in Europe) was developed in conjunction with Reynard in the UK. They used composites and revised the aerodynamics in the front and rear for the body. The 8.0-litre V10 engine unit, putting out 680 bhp, was lightened and shifted further back and lower to improve balance. All up, around 100 kg was shed. Although 6 seconds slower than the McLarens and Porsches at the Pre-qualifying, they were comforted by vying with the Ferraris as the “best of the rest”. Five cars were prepared for two teams: Victor Sifton's Canaska Southwind Motorsport, based in Toronto, ran in the IMSA series. His two cars were led by Price Cobb, who had won with TWR Jaguar in 1990, alongside Mark Dismore and Shawn Hendricks while Sifton raced with Alain Cudini and John Morton. On the other side of the Atlantic, the operation was run by the French ORECA team, moving over from single-seaters into GT racing. Dropping their third car, they had their own Le Mans winner, in Éric Hélary, with Philippe Gache and Olivier Beretta in one car and 2-time class-winner Dominique Dupuy with Brits Perry McCarthy and Justin Bell in their other.

=== LM GT2 ===
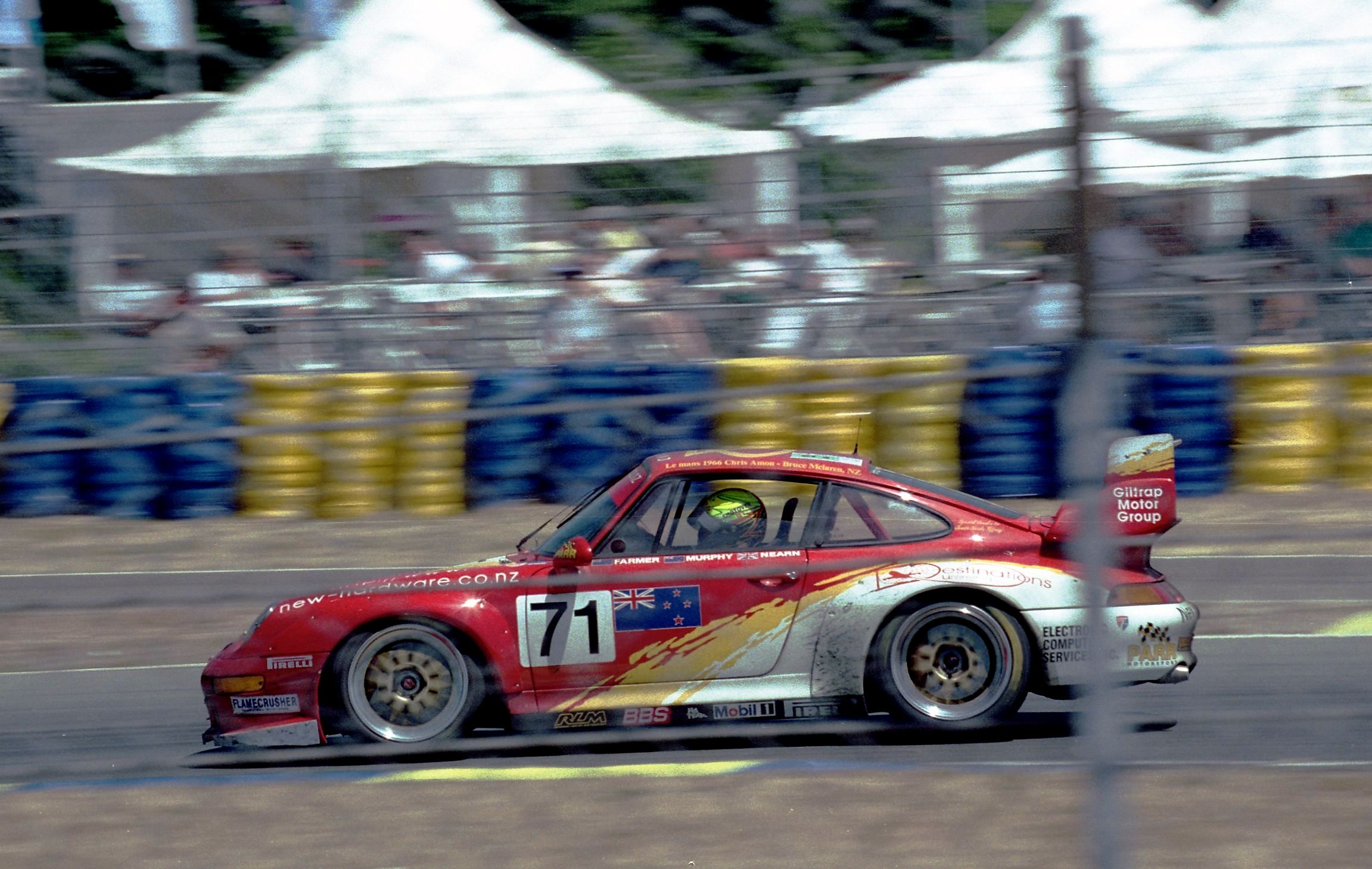
PARR Motorsport Porsche 911 GT2

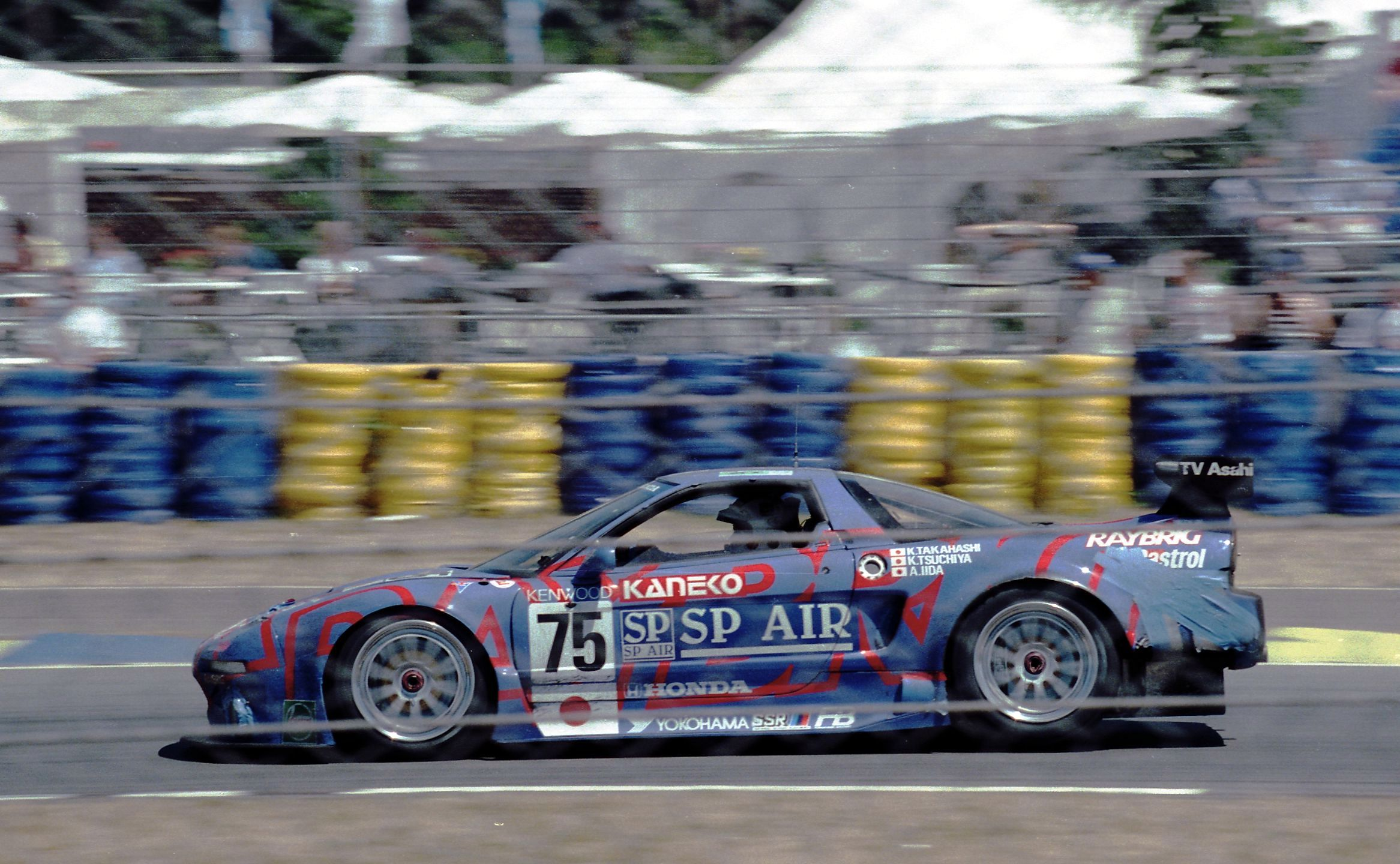
Kunimitsu Honda NSX

Of the 11 starters in GT2, 8 were Porsches. After a poor performance in 1995, the Porsche factory worked up the M64 3.6-litre engines for their customers. Now allowed slightly larger air restrictors, they could get an extra 25 bhp, up to 475 bhp. Both Larbre Compétition and Roock Racing entered their second cars in this class, along with Peter Seikel's German team and the Swiss Haberthur brothers. Another regular in the SRO series was Steve O'Rourke's EMKA Porsche. A new team in the series was from New Zealand – PARR Motorsport came with a pair of Porsches to celebrate the 30th anniversary of Kiwi drivers Bruce McLaren and Chris Amon winning Le Mans for Ford in 1966. Bill Farmer, 4-time NZ Porsche Carrera Cup champion, had also taken his car to Daytona and led the class there. The second car was an entry courtesy of Seikel Motorsport, with Stéphane Ortelli as lead driver. In a surprise, Stadler Motorsport failed to get past the Pre-Qualifying. Last year’s class winners and dominant team in the 1995 SRO series, were bumped near the end of the session, after team-leader Enzo Calderari had only managed two flying laps before he crashed ending their session. They were left as first GT2 reserve.

This year Callaway Cars embarked on a GT1 coupé, the C7, however it proved to be too slow to get past pre-Qualifying. Therefore, the only Callaway at Le Mans this year was the remaining SuperNatural Corvette run by the Agusta Racing Team. The car had been back and forth across the Atlantic to contest both the IMSA and BPR series. Team owner “Rocky” Agusta raced with his regular co-driver Almo Coppelli, and Patrick Camus. Honda had withdrawn its works team from GT racing to instead focus on the American IndyCar series. Privateer Kunimitsu Takahashi brought his team's distinctive mauve Honda NSX back for a third Le Mans, and confident after the class-win in 1995. This year, he was supported by Seikel Motorsport who had been Honda's representatives in European touring car racing, and he kept his same driver-lineup Tsuchiya and Iida. Dutchman Cor Euser had enjoyed his run the previous year with the Marcos, and the company built a third LM600 chassis for him to set up Team Marcos International for running the car in the BPR series with Brazilian Thomas Erdos. The car was fast and performed well, taking pole positions and also two victories at Jarama and Silverstone. After also setting the quickest time in the GT2 class at the Pre-Qualifying, confidence was high. French journalist Pascal Dro was brought in as the third driver.

== Practice and Qualifying ==
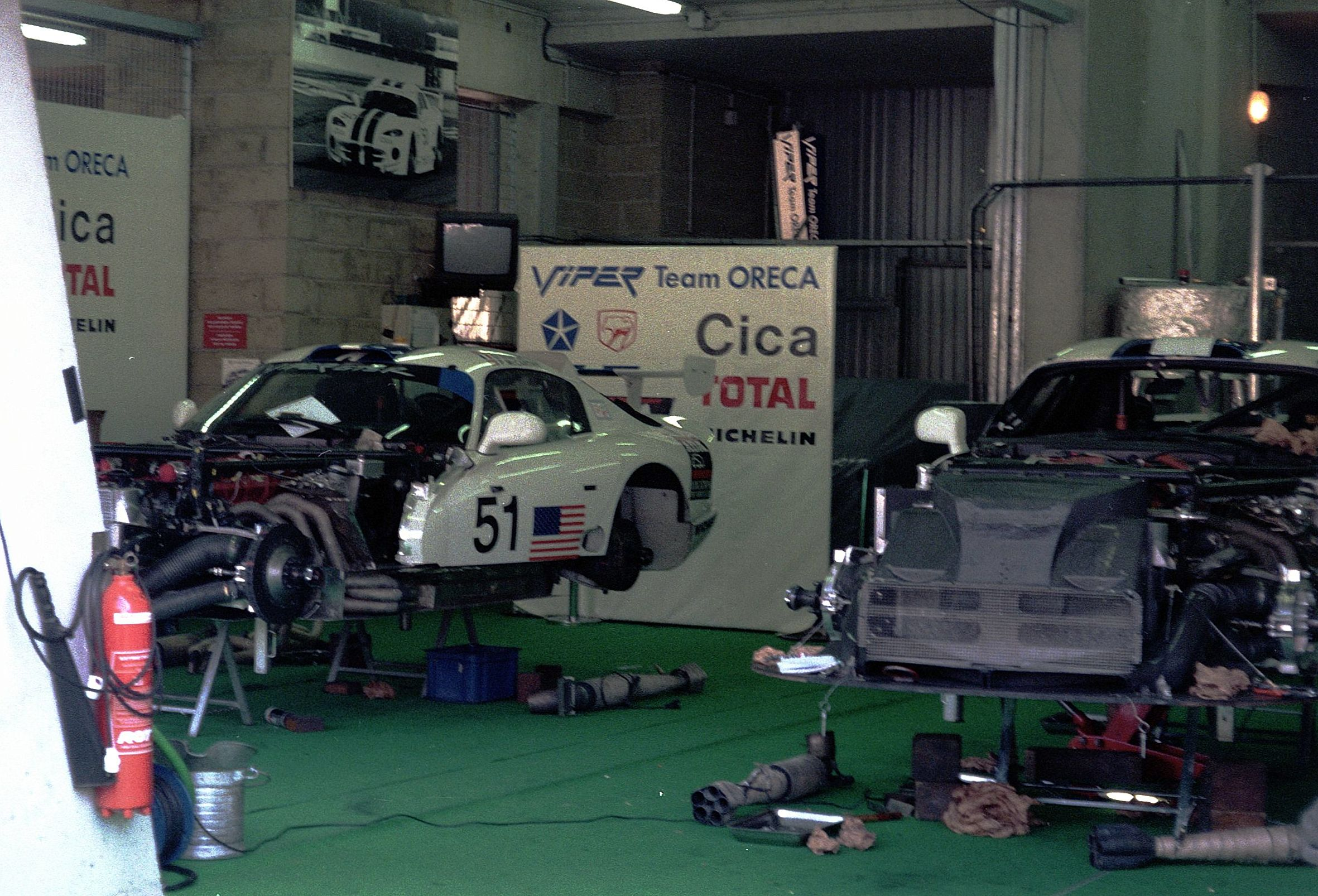
Viper Team ORECA pit-garage

In the Pre-Qualifying, it had been the WSC cars setting the pace, with the Ferraris and Riley & Scott topping the timesheet, half a second faster than the best Courage. Van der Poele picked up where he left off, setting the fastest time in the Wednesday qualifying (3:46.8). A pleased Maranello advised the team to thereafter concentrate on race set-up and not risk any damage. The night session was ended with a major blow for the Porsche works team, when Wendlinger crashed his GT1 heavily. Race engineer Hillburger arranged for a whole new frame to be collected from the factory and flown out to Le Mans overnight. The next day, it was Martini in the TWR-Porsche (3:46.7) and Policand (3:46.8) in the Courage that beat the Ferrari time by the slimmest of margins. Ferrari did not fight back, having already installed their race-engines. Their IMSA rival, the Riley & Scott, was 7th fastest (3:47.6). In GT, the Porsches asserted their dominance, after JJ Lehto had topped the GT times at the Pre-Qualifying weekend. It was Dalmas in the repaired car that got the front-row start over teammate Boutsen by 7-thousandth of a second. Fastest of the McLarens was Steve Soper in the Bigazzi McLaren, who was over a second behind the Porsches with 3:48.5, albeit over 8 seconds better than Lehto’s practice time in 1995. Lehto himself was 10th fastest with a 3:50.0. The two Dave Price cars – pacesetters in 1995 - were surprisingly sluggish, and the slowest of the McLarens, down in 22nd and 24th, even behind the Lister in 18th (3:54.6). The leading Ferrari F40 was the Igol-Ennea car with Gounon setting 3:52.1 for the 16th-best time. Hélary had the quickest of the Vipers, just cracking the 4-minute mark (3:59.1) but qualifying 27th on the grid, ten seconds behind their Porsche rivals showing up the enormity of their challenge. Toshio Suzuki also got the lead Nissan under 4 minutes (3:59.9), lapping fully 10 seconds quicker than the previous year.

After taking pole last year in the WR, Gonin was 12th fastest (3:50.3), more than four seconds off his pole-time showing up the new restrictions on the LM P2 class. The new Kudzu was down at 23rd on the grid (3:57.3) while the Debora was fortuitous to have an automatic entry. After electronics problems in Qualifying, their best time was a dismal 4:33.7 putting them at the back of the field. In GT2, it was Ralf Kelleners in the Roock Porsche who took the class-pole (with 4:05.9 for 34th), impressing on a track he had never raced on before. The Callaway Corvette was second in class (4:09.4 in 37th) while the Seikel Porsche was at the back of the grid with its best lap only 4:22.7.

In a novel change this year the ACO decided to line up the first dozen cars of each class behind each other, with prototypes on the right and GT cars on the left. With only a second between the top seven cars this was not as skewed as might have seemed, giving further credence to the ACO's equivalency regulations.

=== Starting Grid ===
Class leaders are in bold.

Pos	Class	Team	Pos	Class	Team
Pos	Class	Car	Pos	Class	Car
Pos	Class	Time	Pos	Class	Time
1	**LM P1/C90**	**#8 Joest Racing**	2	**LM-GT1**	**#26 Porsche AG**
1	**LM P1/C90**	TWR Porsche WSC-95	2	**LM-GT1**	Porsche 911 GT1
1	**LM P1/C90**	3:46.68	2	**LM-GT1**	3:47.13
3	LM P1/C90	#3 Courage Compétition	4	LM-GT1	#25 Porsche AG
3	LM P1/C90	Courage C36	4	LM-GT1	Porsche 911 GT1
3	LM P1/C90	3:46.79	4	LM-GT1	3:47.14
5	**IMSA-WSC**	**#17 Racing for Belgium**	6	LM-GT1	#38 Team Bigazzi
5	**IMSA-WSC**	Ferrari 333SP LM	6	LM-GT1	McLaren F1 GTR LM
5	**IMSA-WSC**	3:46.84	6	LM-GT1	3:48.53
7	LM P1/C90	#7 Joest Racing	8	LM-GT1	#33 Gulf Racing
7	LM P1/C90	TWR Porsche WSC-95	8	LM-GT1	McLaren F1 GTR LM
7	LM P1/C90	3:47.38	8	LM-GT1	3:49.95
9	IMSA-WSC	#19 Riley & Scott Cars	10	LM-GT1	#34 Gulf Racing
9	IMSA-WSC	Riley & Scott Mk III	10	LM-GT1	McLaren F1 GTR LM
9	IMSA-WSC	3:47.64	10	LM-GT1	3:51.29
11	LM P1/C90	#4 Courage Compétition	12	LM-GT1	#39 Team Bigazzi
11	LM P1/C90	Courage C36	12	LM-GT1	McLaren F1 GTR LM
11	LM P1/C90	3:49.75	12	LM-GT1	3:51.55
13	LM P1/C90	#1 Kremer Racing	14	LM-GT1	#45 Igol-Ennea
13	LM P1/C90	Kremer K8	14	LM-GT1	Ferrari F40 GT Evo
13	LM P1/C90	3:50.13	14	LM-GT1	3:52.07
15	**LM P2**	**#14 Welter Racing**	16	LM-GT1	#53 BBA Compétition
15	**LM P2**	WR LM96	16	LM-GT1	McLaren F1 GTR LM
15	**LM P2**	3:50.25	16	LM-GT1	3:54.03
17	IMSA-WSC	#18 Team Scandia	18	LM-GT1	#28 Newcastle United Lister
17	IMSA-WSC	Ferrari 333SP LM	18	LM-GT1	Lister Storm GTL
17	IMSA-WSC	3:50.85	18	LM-GT1	3:54.60
19	LM P1/C90	#5 La Filière Elf	20	LM-GT1	#44 Igol-Ennea
19	LM P1/C90	Courage C36	20	LM-GT1	Ferrari F40 GT Evo
19	LM P1/C90	3:52.15	20	LM-GT1	3:54.73
21	LM P1/C90	#2 Kremer Racing	22	LM-GT1	#30 DPR West Competition
21	LM P1/C90	Kremer K8	22	LM-GT1	McLaren F1 GTR LM
21	LM P1/C90	3:52.38	22	LM-GT1	3:55.92
23	LM P2	#20 Mazdaspeed	24	LM-GT1	#29 DPR Mach One Racing
23	LM P2	Kudzu DLM	24	LM-GT1	McLaren F1 GTR LM
23	LM P2	3:57.34	24	LM-GT1	3:56.21
25	LM P2	#15 Welter Racing	26	LM-GT1	#56 Ferté Pilot Racing
25	LM P2	WR LM95/6	26	LM-GT1	Ferrari F40 LM
25	LM P2	3:53.95	26	LM-GT1	3:57.34
27	LM-GT1	#50 Viper Team ORECA	28	LM-GT1	#55 Roock Racing Team
27	LM-GT1	Dodge Viper GTS-R	28	LM-GT1	Porsche 911 GT2 Evo
27	LM-GT1	3:59.06	28	LM-GT1	3:59.63
29	LM-GT1	#23 NISMO	30	LM-GT1	#48 Canaska Southwind Motorsport
29	LM-GT1	Nissan Skyline GT-R LM	30	LM-GT1	Dodge Viper GTS-R
29	LM-GT1	3:59.95	30	LM-GT1	4:01.20
31	LM-GT1	#59 Ennea Ferrari Club Italia	32	LM-GT1	#49 Canaska Southwind Motorsport
31	LM-GT1	Ferrari F40 GT Evo	32	LM-GT1	Dodge Viper GTS-R
31	LM-GT1	4:02.55	32	LM-GT1	4:03.78
33	LM-GT1	#37 Konrad Motorsport	34	**LM-GT2**	**#79 Roock Racing Team**
33	LM-GT1	Porsche 911 GT2 Evo	34	**LM-GT2**	Porsche 911 GT2
33	LM-GT1	4:05.15	34	**LM-GT2**	4:05.89
35	LM-GT1	#22 NISMO	36	LM-GT1	#57 Toyota Team SARD
35	LM-GT1	Nissan Skyline GT-R LM	36	LM-GT1	Toyota Supra LM
35	LM-GT1	4:06.18	36	LM-GT1	4:06.53
37	LM-GT2	#74 Agusta Racing Team	38	LM-GT1	#46 Toyota Menicon SARD
37	LM-GT2	Callaway Corvette	38	LM-GT1	SARD-Toyota MC8-R
37	LM-GT2	4:09.35	38	LM-GT1	4:09.45
39	LM-GT2	#83 PARR Motorsport	40	LM-GT2	#73 Elf Haberthur Racing
39	LM-GT2	Porsche 911 GT2	40	LM-GT2	Porsche 911 GT2
39	LM-GT2	4:10.20	40	LM-GT2	4:10.78
41	LM-GT1	#27 Chéreau Sports	42	LM-GT1	#51 Viper Team ORECA
41	LM-GT1	Porsche 911 GT2 Evo	42	LM-GT1	Dodge Viper GTS-R
41	LM-GT1	4:10.85	42	LM-GT1	4:11.01
43	LM-GT2	#81 Team Marcos	44	LM-GT2	#82 Larbre Compétition
43	LM-GT2	Marcos Mantara 600LM	44	LM-GT2	Porsche 911 GT2
43	LM-GT2	4:11.66	44	LM-GT2	4:11.79
45	LM-GT2	#70 S. O’Rourke	46	LM-GT2	#71 PARR Motorsport
45	LM-GT2	Porsche 911 GT2	46	LM-GT2	Porsche 911 GT2
45	LM-GT2	4:12.79	46	LM-GT2	4:12.88
47	LM-GT2	#75 Team Kunimitsu Honda	48	LM-GT2	#77 Seikel Motorsport
47	LM-GT2	Honda NSX	48	LM-GT2	Porsche 911 GT2
47	LM-GT2	4:18.47	48	LM-GT2	4:22.70

== Race ==
=== Start ===
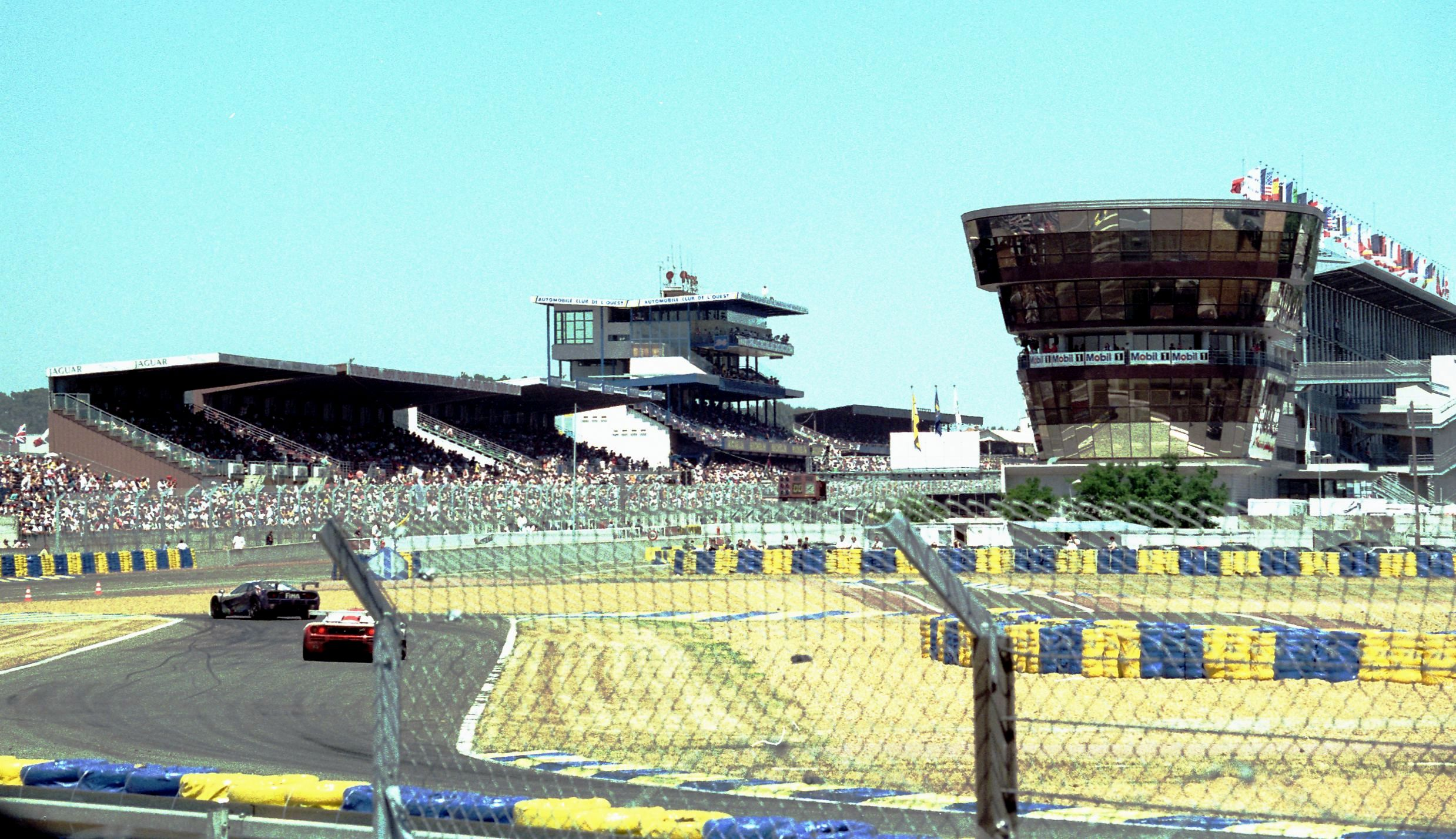
The Ford chicanes approaching the pit and main grandstand

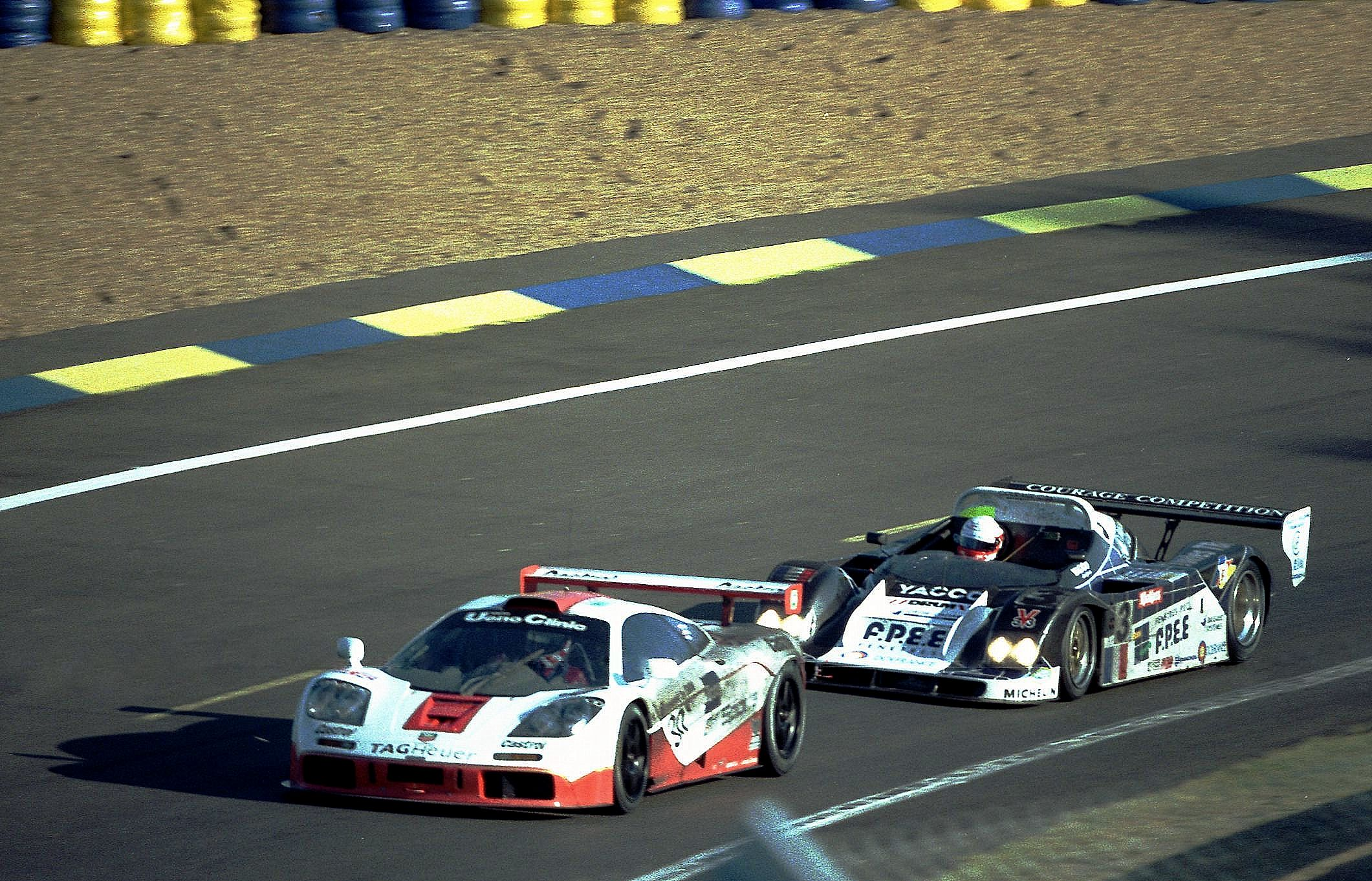
West McLaren leading the Courage into the Dunlop esses

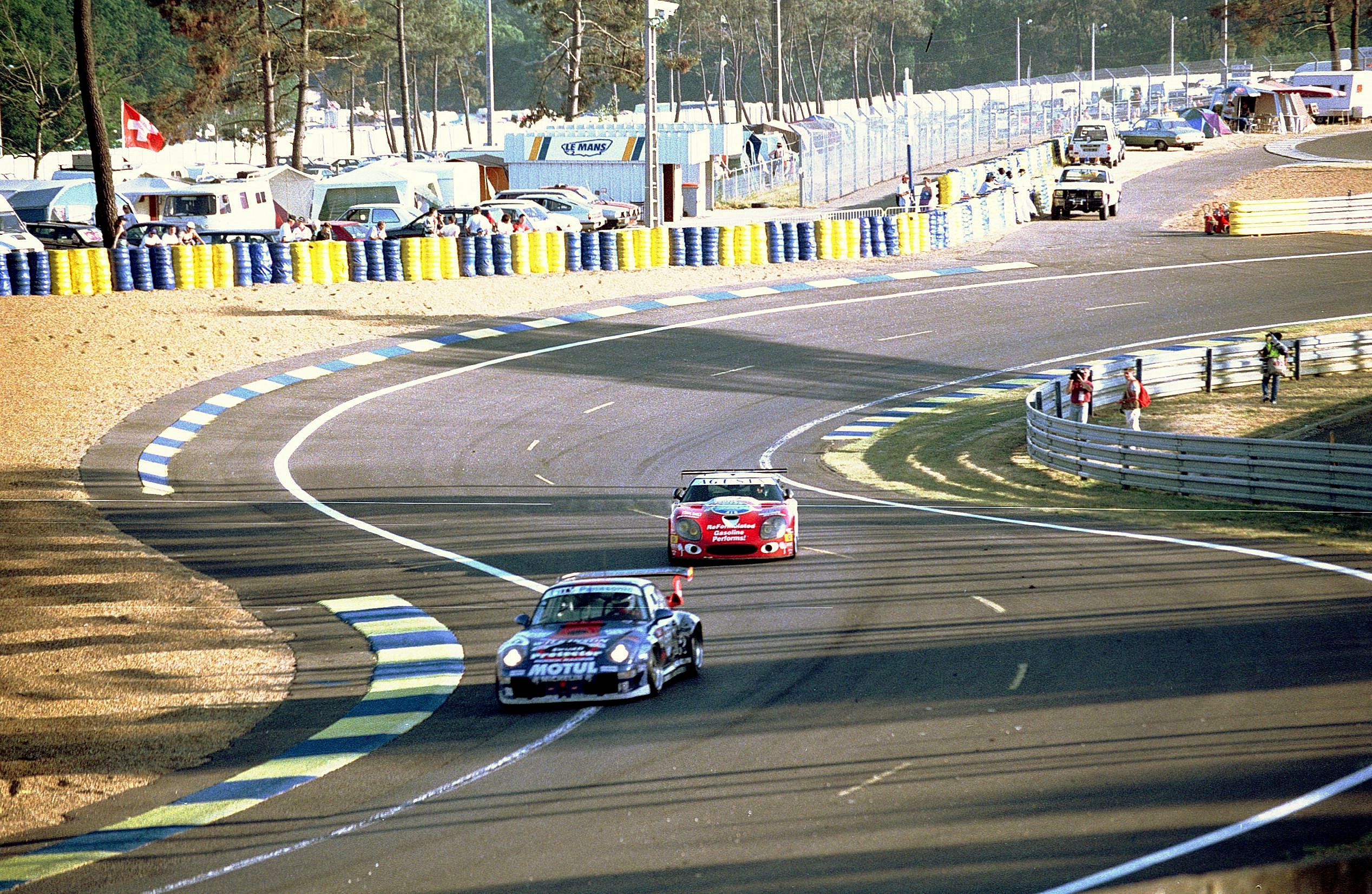
Roock Porsche #55 leads the Callaway #74 through the Esses

If 1995 was one of the wettest Le Mans, then in stark contrast, 1996 was one of the hottest. Before the start of the race, Henri Pescarolo was given a special award from the ACO celebrating his 30 starts and four victories. In the morning warmup, the ongoing problems affecting the Debora recurred when the engine blew. With insufficient time to install a replacement they could not take the start and the second WR was called up from the reserves. The pacecar crawled through the chicanes, backing the field up but from the start, the two Porsche GT1s swept into the lead. Close behind them was van der Poele in the Ferrari, the two Joest cars and Cottaz in the Courage. Early trouble struck Ferrari on the second lap, when team-owner Andy Evans went off into the gravel at Mulsanne corner avoiding another car, taking 4 laps to get extricated. Then, at the end of his stint, he was marooned out on the track out of fuel, even though the gauge was showing enough for another lap. The leading six soon pulled ahead, then on lap 5 the TWRs passed the Ferrari and on consecutive laps picked off the two Porsches. Theys and Jones built up their lead. The GTs would go further between stops with their bigger fuel tanks while prototypes would be faster and could triple-stint their tyres to save some pit-time. However, alarms rang for the other teams when the economic TWRs went 12 laps on their fuel stint compared to the 10-11 of the other prototypes and only 13 for the Porsches. In fact, the Riley & Scott team were dismayed to find they could only cover 9 laps between stops. So at the end of the first hour, after 15 laps, it was Jones with a 30-second lead over Theys and Dalmas, with Cottaz, Wollek and Lehto a further 20 seconds back.

Davy Jones put in a powerful triple-stint from the start that established the black TWR in a strong lead. The Porsche engines had the measure of the field, but the works team was undone by off-track excursions in the 7th hour: Stuck was squeezed onto a kerb when lapping Alliot's Courage and Dalmas went into the gravel at Mulsanne which both necessitated ten minutes lost in the pits for checks and repairs. Cottaz, in the fastest Courage, had kept up with the top four initially, but lost time in the second hour with electronics issues. The issue was traced to the Bosch Motronic engine management system, but 4 laps were lost in the 12 minutes to replace it. Worse though, 90 minutes later teammate Lammers suffered a similar issue, and coasted into the pitlane “deadstick”. Only reaching the pit entrance, he had to push it himself down to his pit garage. It took almost an hour to fix before Warwick could rejoin the race, near the back of the field. Likewise, the best Kremer, was well into the top ten until Lässig was stranded for 20 minutes in the Esses unable to engage a gear. Far worse at 7.20pm was for the other Kremer, when the engine cover blew off on the high-speed run from Mulsanne to Indianapolis which threw Dickens into the barriers on both sides of the track in the biggest accident of the race. The former Le Mans winner emerged from his 300kph crash shocked but unhurt. Both cars in the Gulf and Bigazzi McLaren teams filled out the lower half of the top ten. Mid-evening, Pace had put the 6th-placed Riley & Scott into the gravel, and the team lost six laps. Running midfield after that, they needed three brake-disc replacements and then finally ground to a halt on Mulsanne in the early hours with a box of neutrals.

In GT2, it was the Dutch Marcos that had the lead, due to team-owner Cor Euser’s better fuel economy. However, soon after French journalist-driver Pascal Dro took the wheel, the car starting billowing smoke. Much oil was added, but in the one exploratory lap Euser did, the engine gulped four more litres of oil, and the signs were terminal. The pole-sitting Roock Porsche moved up into the lead and thereafter was unchallenged. At 8pm, Coppelli ran over debris on the Mulsanne straight and punctured a rear tyre. Unwisely though, he kept up a high pace and the tyre soon shredded itself and then, in turn, tore off great chunks of the rear bodywork leaving his own debris across the track. Two hours had to be spent repairing the chassis and the damaged engine. In LM P2, the Kudzu was making the pace ahead of the reserve WR. After a good start, the other WR had lost a wheel on the Mulsanne Straight. Petit made it to the pits, but the car had slipped to the back of the field when it resumed. Going into the night, the reserve car lost time with a puncture and then a transmission rebuild after midnight that put it behind its recovering teammate.

At 9.30pm the Stuck Porsche had to pit, as the undertray had finally worked loose after its earlier off-road thump. Ten minutes, and two laps, were lost fixing it. While that was being attended to, teammate Dalmas came in with a nose full of gravel. Repairs and new front brake calipers dropped them out the top10 after 10pm.

=== Night ===
The Joest cars maintained a comfortable 1–2 lead going into the night. The veteran team of Wollek/Stuck/Boutsen pushed hard to make up their lost time, catching the Gulf McLaren at midnight and finally passed Theys for second place at half-race distance. Soon after midnight, the throttle stuck open for Collard in the 5th-placed La Filière Courage. Unfortunately, he burnt out the clutch trying to get back to the pits on the ignition switch and they lost an hour replacing it. Meanwhile, after its own delays, the Cottaz/Alliot/Policand Courage had quickly moved back up through the field from 33rd and had got to fourth by 2am. Just before halftime, the FCI Ferrari was thrown into the gravel when its clutch broke up, being the final F40 to retire. The cars had initially been quick, slotting in behind the McLarens, but first Gounon had ignition issues in the second hour and retired at 6.30pm. His teammates were up to 15th when Della Noce parked their car at Arnage at 10pm with a broken engine. The blue Pilot F40LM was not far behind but pulled in for gearbox repairs at 10.15 which took an hour. After heading back out, the young rookie Leboissetier came in for a regular pitstop when fuel spilt onto the hot exhaust. A sudden inferno (spectacular in the dark of night) erupted around the car that was quickly extinguished. The driver was well protected, but the electrics were destroyed.

At the halfway point, the top three were all still on the same lap (179) with the Porsche now between the two TWRs. The Courage, back up to 4th was two laps back and the remaining Ferrari WSC another two laps back (175). It had the Gulf team car (the leading McLaren) in close pursuit. The two Bigazzi cars were 7th and 8th (174) with four cars jockeying to complete the top10 (173): the other works Porsche and the West, Gulf and Harrods McLarens. The Lister had been running well, always just out of the top10 for most of the race, and was soldiering on in 13th (169), the Kudzu still comfortably led the LM P2 in 14th (168) while the Roock Porsche was untroubled in 15th (164) leading the GT2 class. Terada had pitted the Kudzu-Mazda at 1.30am to replace a punctured oil cooler, costing a quarter-hour, but after halftime, Downing started having gearshift issues. With no spare unit, the crew had to rebuild the existing one which would take five hours. They finally rejoined the race after 9am, but at the back of the field. While this was going on, at 4.30am Duez bought the leading Bigazzi McLaren into the pits stuck in gear. This team did have the luxury of a spare gearbox, that took an hour to fit and dropping them to 16th. Soon after, at 4.45am, Needell brought the Lister in with the same problem, costing them almost 90 minutes to change.

=== Morning ===
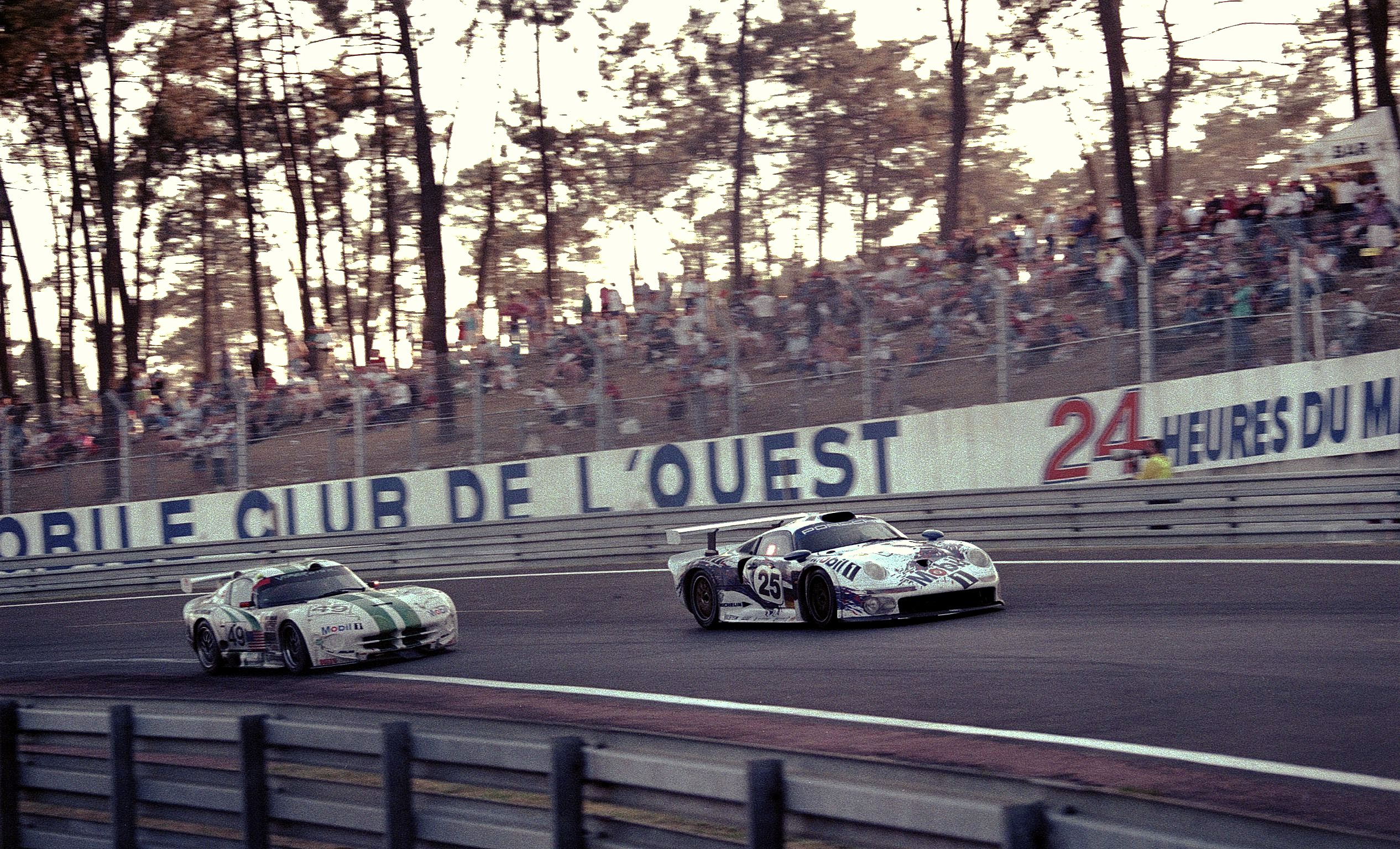
Porsche and Viper GT1s in the Esses

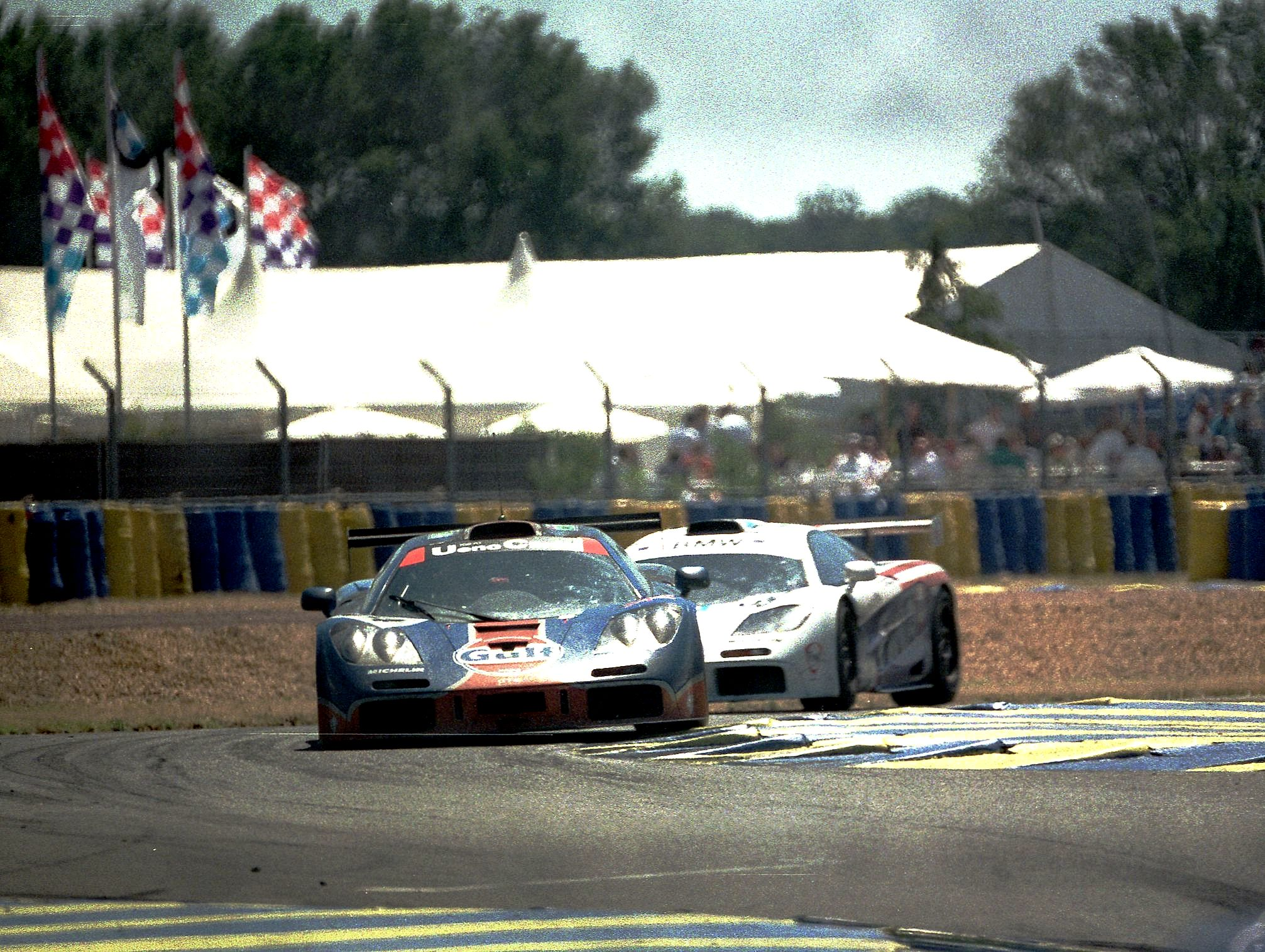
Rival McLaren teams: Gulf vs West

The Belgian Ferrari was still running fifth until, soon after dawn, it broke its gearbox and had to get the whole rear-end replaced. Van der Poele then took off, resetting the race's fastest lap several times. After a routine changeover at 7am, Bachelart left the pits but only got as far as the Dunlop Bridge when the suspension collapsed, throwing him violently into the wall. All six Ferraris in the race had now retired, leaving their many fans disappointed. Soon after, Alliot suffered a stuck throttle and crashed the 4th-placed Courage just further along, at Tertre Rouge, and also had to retire. The second Courage had also been staging a strong fightback up the lap-charts through the night. Lammers had been fortunate when a wheel came adrift when he was approaching the pits near dawn. They were back up to 8th when Andretti went deep into the gravel at Indianapolis just after 11am. It took half an hour to be extricated and then have the front-end repaired to emerge in 15th. Their frustrating race was capped off when Warwick too lost a wheel in the final hour. They eventually finished 13th.

The leading TWR had come in for its scheduled brake-change at 8.30am and briefly ceded the lead to Stuck/Wollek/Boutsen but only until they, in turn, had their pitstop when Jones resumed at the front. The other TWR was still in third until drama occurred at 9.20am, when Martini dropped the second TWR in the gravel at the first Mulsanne chicane. He had missed his braking point trying to clear his visor and swat a swarm of mosquitoes. Taking over, Theys rolled to a stop on his out-lap and lost more time having to reset the engine-management system. He lost a place to Ray Bellm's Gulf McLaren, which was flying in the hands of Lehto and Weaver, albeit 7 laps down. But the pace took its toll on the McLaren's gearbox and they lost all that and more with a 90-minute stop to replace the clutch and transmission, dropping them down the field to eventually finish 9th.

The Bigazzi McLarens had established themselves in the top10 after initial niggles, but the new day brought bigger issues. After Duez had his gearbox replaced around dawn, their teammates then lost theirs mid-morning while running in 7th. Both eventually finished though, in 11th and 8th respectively. The very quick Roock GT2 Porsche was still controlling its class with a strong run. Their only competition now was the two New Zealand Porsches of PARR Motorsport, running in second and third, several laps behind, while the other class-runners fell by the wayside. The three starters in LM P2 were down to two, after David had gone off at the Porsche curves at dawn. The sister car had taken the class-lead while the Kudzu was having its gearbox rebuilt. But then when Gonin crashed it mid-morning that just left Jim Downing's car as the “last man standing”, albeit running at the tail of the field.

=== Finish and post-race ===
Through the morning, the second TWR had been having problems with its engine-management system, cutting out randomly and leaving Theys and Alboreto stranded out on track until they could get it restarted. Then with only 45 minutes to go, Martini coasted to a stop out of Arnage - the driveshaft had broken. It was no cruise to the finish for the Joest team though, with the veteran team in the #25 Porsche never giving up and pushing hard all the way, within a lap and just waiting for the TVR to slip up. However, despite starting to emit more exhaust smoke, the Jones/Reuter/Wurz car never missed a beat, on top of the scoring charts at the end of every hour and the car had the shortest time in the pits of any (a shade over 50 minutes). In the end they won by a lap from the Porsche GT1, yet again Bob Wollek was beaten back to second place (and yet again, stymied by time lost to off-track excursions).

After Martini retired, the other Porsche inherited third place, having driven back up through the field. However, with that relentless pressure, all three drivers made errors and spent time in the gravel. In the end they were a distant 13 laps behind the winners. McLarens took the next three places: the two DPR cars (4th and 6th) had been struggling throughout the race with poor handling and chronic brake-wear. However, both cars had been outside the top 20 at midnight, so their effort was notable. The Harrods car had a considerable drop in power through the night until the pitcrew found a driver tear-off visor in the air intake. They had also spent the final four hours running with only 4th and 5th gears.

At 54, Derek Bell found it disappointing to conclude his remarkable Le Mans career in such a way. Over 26 starts, it included five outright victories and a pair of 2nd-places, as well as winning the Daytona 24 hours three times and twice winning the World Sportscar Championship, thus making him one of the all-time great sports car drivers.

Between them was the first Gulf McLaren, also with a gearbox on its last legs after also having to replace the fuel pump, oil pump, and oil lines. Seventh was the Pescarolo/Lagorce/Collard Courage of the La Filière team. After their clutch replacement overnight, they then dropped 10 laps getting both rear dampers replaced and finished 27 laps down. The four Vipers had a difficult race with a number of mechanical issues. The best-placed one was the Canaska car of Cobb/Hendricks/Dismore, that finished 10th. They had endured two broken fuel pumps, and the rear wheelbearings had overheated from the new brakes so they had driven cautiously over the final quarter, picking up places as others had their troubles. The Lister team had spent 45 minutes in the morning repairing a brake master cylinder, and with 40 minutes to go, came back in with dying piston rings. The team reckoned the car had only one lap left in it, so they parked up to complete a very careful final lap as the clock came round to 3pm.

The Roock Racing Porsche easily won the GT2 class finishing 12th overall. Their good run had been interrupted at midday to replace a broken driveshaft (in only 8 minutes), and the last two hours were quite tense when the team noticed that two of the three securing bolts on the turbocharger were found to be cracked. However, the engine held together, and they won by four laps ahead of the PARR Motorsport Porsche. Apart from an early puncture, the Kiwis had had an unspectacular but reliable run spending the least time in the pits, aside from the race-winners. Their teammates had also been running well until 7.20am when they lost a place to the Kunimitsu Honda while getting a turbo replaced. The Honda had not been as competitive in dry weather this year, but had moved up the field with its reliability. After its gearbox-rebuild, the Kudzu-Mazda had kept circulating. However, their persistence paid off and they got to the flag as the final finisher, 103 laps behind the winners (making the classification mark by just 3 laps) By virtue of being the only LM P2 car running, they won their class.

Porsche, in its various incarnations, dominated the podiums in prototype and GT. Respective team principals, Tom Walkinshaw and Max Welti were both overseas at the Canadian F1 GP (with Arrows and Sauber) and shared the celebration with each other. Without the rain to slow the pace down, the McLarens were outclassed and broke down as they tried to match the pace of their Porsche rivals, showing up their gearbox frailties. Given the large number of gearbox and transmissions faults in the race, it was quite apparent the teams would need to do a lot of work to build sequential units for the new cars that were strong enough for the heavy workload of high speeds with constant rapid up- and down-shifting over 24 hours. The Porsche dominance showed a number of manufacturers the writing was on the wall: Ferrari withdrew at the end of the season, Chrysler retreated back to GT2, while Nissan and Toyota went back to the drawing board to design GT-prototypes from the ground up. At just 22 years, 3 months, Wurz became the youngest ever Le Mans winner (a record he still holds to date), starting an F1 career exactly a year later to the day, with Benetton at the Canadian Grand Prix. Reinhold Joest's deal with Porsche said that he could keep the car if it was a race-winner, and it was to reappear again for the 1997 race.

The Porsche works team entered their GT1s in last three races of the BPR series, winning all three. In the new year, they sold further cars to customer teams, usurping McLaren to become the new dominant force in GT racing. Despite a poor result at Le Mans, the Riley & Scott of Doyle Racing went on to win the IMSA Championship and Wayne Taylor the Drivers' Championship. Andy Evans, owner of the Scandia Team running the Ferrari prototypes, along with Roberto Muller (ex-CEO of Reebok), bought control of the American IMSA organisation, and their changes led to the resignation of a number of the board members and the formation of a breakaway series by the USRRC.

== Official results ==
=== Finishers ===
Results taken from Quentin Spurring's book, officially licensed by the ACO
Class Winners are in Bold text.

Pos	Class	No.	Team	Drivers	Chassis	Engine	Tyre	Laps
1	**LM P1/C90**	**7**	**(Germany) Joest Racing**	**(United States) Davy Jones** **(Germany) Manuel Reuter** **(Austria) Alexander Wurz**	TWR-Porsche WSC95	Porsche 935/76 3.0L F6 twin turbo	G	354
2	**LM-GT1**	**25**	**(Germany) Porsche AG**	**(Germany) Hans-Joachim Stuck** **(Belgium) Thierry Boutsen** **(France) Bob Wollek**	Porsche 911 GT1	Porsche 9R1 3.2L F6 twin turbo	M	353
3	LM-GT1	26	(Germany) Porsche AG	(Austria) Karl Wendlinger (France) Yannick Dalmas (Canada) Scott Goodyear	Porsche 911 GT1	Porsche 9R1 3.2L F6 twin turbo	M	341
4	LM-GT1	30	(United Kingdom) David Price Racing; West Competition	(Germany) Thomas Bscher (Denmark) John Nielsen (Netherlands) Peter Kox	McLaren F1 GTR LM	BMW S70/3 6.1L V12	G	338
5	LM-GT1	34	(United Kingdom) Gulf Racing	(United Kingdom) Lindsay Owen-Jones (France) Pierre-Henri Raphanel (Australia) David Brabham	McLaren F1 GTR LM	BMW S70/3 6.1L V12	M	335
6	LM-GT1	29	(United Kingdom) David Price Racing; Mach One Racing	(United Kingdom) Andy Wallace (France) Olivier Grouillard (United Kingdom) Derek Bell	McLaren F1 GTR LM	BMW S70/3 6.1L V12	G	328
7	LM P1/C90	5	(France) La Filière Elf	(France) Henri Pescarolo (France) Franck Lagorce (France) Emmanuel Collard	Courage C36	Porsche 935/76 3.0L F6 twin turbo	M	327
8	LM-GT1	39	(Italy) Team Bigazzi (United States) BMW North America	(Venezuela) Johnny Cecotto (Brazil) Nelson Piquet (United States) Danny Sullivan	McLaren F1 GTR LM	BMW S70/3 6.1L V12	M	324
9	LM-GT1	33	(United Kingdom) Gulf Racing	(United Kingdom) Ray Bellm (United Kingdom) James Weaver (Finland) JJ Lehto	McLaren F1 GTR LM	BMW S70/3 6.1L V12	M	323
10	LM-GT1	48	(United States) Canaska Southwind Motorsport	(United States) Price Cobb (United States) Shawn Hendricks (United States) Mark Dismore	Dodge Viper GTS-R	Chrysler 356/T6 8.0L V10	M	320
11	LM-GT1	38	(Italy) Team Bigazzi (Germany) Team BMW Motorsport	(France) Jacques Laffite (United Kingdom) Steve Soper (Belgium) Marc Duez	McLaren F1 GTR LM	BMW S70/3 6.1L V12	M	318
12	**LM-GT2**	**79**	**(Germany) Roock Racing Team**	**(France) Guy Martinolle** **(Germany) Ralf Kelleners** **(Switzerland) Bruno Eichmann**	Porsche 911 GT2	Porsche M64/81 3.6L F6 twin turbo	M	317
13	LM P1/C90	4	(France) Courage Compétition	(United States) Mario Andretti (Netherlands) Jan Lammers (United Kingdom) Derek Warwick	Courage C36	Porsche 935/76 3.0L F6 twin turbo	M	315
14	LM-GT2	71	(New Zealand) New Hardware PARR Motorsport (private entrant)	(New Zealand) Bill Farmer (New Zealand) Greg Murphy (United Kingdom) Robert Nearn	Porsche 911 GT2	Porsche M64/81 3.6L F6 twin turbo	P	313
15	LM-GT1	23	(Japan) NISMO	(Japan) Kazuyoshi Hoshino (Japan) Masahiro Hasemi (Japan) Toshio Suzuki	Nissan Skyline GT-R LM	Nissan RB26-DETT 2.6L S6 twin turbo	B	307
16	LM-GT2*	75	(Japan) Team Kunimitsu Honda	(Japan) Kunimitsu Takahashi (Japan) Keiichi Tsuchiya (Japan) Akira Iida	Honda NSX GT	Honda RX-306E5-IT 3.0L V6	Y	305
17	LM-GT2	83	(New Zealand) New Hardware PARR Motorsport (Germany) Seikel Motorsport (private entrant)	(Monaco) Stéphane Ortelli (United States) Andy Pilgrim (New Zealand) Andrew Bagnall	Porsche 911 GT2	Porsche M64/81 3.6L F6 twin turbo	P	299
18	LM-GT2*	77	(Germany) Seikel Motorsport (private entrant)	(France) Guy Fuster (Austria) Manfred Jurasz (Japan) Takaji Suzuki	Porsche 911 GT2	Porsche M64/81 3.6L F6 twin turbo	P	297
19	LM-GT1	28	(United Kingdom) Newcastle United Lister	(United Kingdom) Geoff Lees (United Kingdom) Tiff Needell (United Kingdom) Anthony Reid	Lister Storm GTS	Jaguar HE 7.0L V12	M	295
20	LM-GT2	82	(France) Larbre Compétition	(France) Patrice Goueslard (Germany) André Ahrlé (France) Patrick Bourdais	Porsche 911 GT2	Porsche M64/81 3.6L F6 twin turbo	M	284
21	LM-GT1	50	(France) Viper Team ORECA	(France) Éric Hélary (France) Philippe Gache (Monaco) Olivier Beretta	Dodge Viper GTS-R	Chrysler 356/T6 8.0L V10	M	283
22	LM-GT1	27	(France) Chéreau Sports (France) Larbre Compétition	(France) Jean-Luc Chéreau (France) Pierre Yver (France) Jack Leconte	Porsche 911 GT2 Evo	Porsche M64/83 3.6L F6 twin turbo	M	279
23	LM-GT1	49	(United States) Canaska Southwind Motorsport	(Canada) Victor Sifton (France) Alain Cudini (United States) John Morton	Dodge Viper GTS-R	Chrysler 356/T6 8.0L V10	M	269
24	LM-GT1	46	(Japan) Team Menicon SARD	(France) Alain Ferté (Italy) Mauro Martini (France) Pascal Fabre	SARD MC8-R	Lexus R40V-T 4.0L V8 twin turbo	D	256
25	**LM-P2***	**20**	**(Japan) Mazdaspeed**	**(Japan) Yojiro Terada** **(United States) Jim Downing** **(France) Franck Fréon**	Kudzu DLM	Mazda R20B 2.0L triple-rotor	G	251

- Note *: one of the ten “Automatic Entries” awarded by the ACO.

=== Did not finish ===
Pos	Class	No	Team	Drivers	Chassis	Engine	Tyre	Laps	Reason
DNF	LM P1/C90	8	(Germany) Joest Racing	(Italy) Michele Alboreto (Italy) Pierluigi Martini (Belgium) Didier Theys	TWR-Porsche WSC95	Porsche 935/76 3.0L F6 twin turbo	G	300	Transmission (24hr)
DNF	LM-P2	14	(France) Welter Racing	(France) Patrick Gonin (France) Pierre Petit (France) Marc Rostan	WR LM96	Peugeot 405-Raid 2.0L S4 turbo	M	221	Accident (20hr)
DNF	LM P1/C90*	3	(France) Courage Compétition	(France) Philippe Alliot (France) Didier Cottaz (France) Jérôme Policand	Courage C36	Porsche 935/76 3.0L F6 twin turbo	M	215	Accident (16hr)
DNF	LM-GT1*	22	(Japan) NISMO	(Japan) Aguri Suzuki (Japan) Masahiko Kageyama (Japan) Masahiko Kondo	Nissan Skyline GT-R LM	Nissan RB26-DETT 2.6L S6 twin turbo	B	209	Accident (17hr)
DNF	IMSA-WSC	17	(United States) Team Scandia; Racing For Belgium	(Belgium) Eric van de Poele (Belgium) Marc Goossens (Belgium) Éric Bachelart	Ferrari 333 SP	Ferrari F130E 4.0L V12	P	208	Accident (16hr)
DNF	LM-GT1*	57	(Japan) Toyota Team SARD	(Japan) Masanori Sekiya (Japan) Hidetoshi Mitsusada (Japan) Masami Kageyama	Toyota Supra GT-LM	Toyota 3S-GTE 2.1L S4 turbo	D	205	Accident (19hr)
DNF	LM-P2	15 reserve	(France) Welter Racing	(France) William David (France) Sébastien Enjolras (France) Arnaud Trévisiol	WR LM95/6	Peugeot 405-Raid 2.0L S4 turbo	M	162	Accident (15hr)
DNF	IMSA-WSC	19	(United States) Riley & Scott Cars	(South Africa) Wayne Taylor (United States) Scott Sharp (United States) Jim Pace	Riley & Scott Mk III	Oldsmobile Aurora 4.0L V8	P	157	Transmission (13hr)
DNF	LM-GT1*	53	(France) BBA Compétition (United Kingdom) Kokusai Kaihatsu Racing	(France) Fabien Giroix (Switzerland) Jean-Denis Délétraz (Brazil) Maurizio Sandro Sala	McLaren F1 GTR LM	BMW S70/3 6.1L V12	M	146	Engine (12hr)
DNF	LM-GT1	59	(Italy) Ennea Ferrari Club Italia (private entrant)	(United Kingdom) Robin Donovan (Italy) Piero Nappi (Japan) Tetsuya Ota	Ferrari F40 GTE	Ferrari F120B 3.5L V8 twin turbo	P	129	Accident (13hr)
DNF	LM-GT2	74	(United Kingdom) / (Italy) Agusta Racing Team	(Italy) Riccardo “Rocky” Agusta (Italy) Almo Coppelli (France) Patrick Camus	Callaway Corvette; Super Natural	Chevrolet LT1 6.2L V8	D	114	Transmission (13hr)
DNF	LM P1/C90*	1	(Germany) Kremer Racing	(France) Christophe Bouchut (Germany) Jürgen Lässig (Finland) Harri Toivonen	Kremer K8	Porsche 935/76 3.0L F6 twin turbo	G	110	Accident (10hr)
DNF	LM-GT1	37	(Germany) Konrad Motorsport	(Austria) Franz Konrad (Brazil) Antonio de Azevedo Herrmann (Germany) Wido Rössler	Porsche 911 GT2 Evo	Porsche M64/83 3.6L F6 twin turbo	M	107	Accident (9hr)
DNF	LM-GT1	44	(Italy) Igol Ennea SRL	(Italy) Luciano Della Noce (Sweden) Anders Olofsson (Sweden) Carl Rosenblad	Ferrari F40 GTE	Ferrari F120B 3.6L V8 twin turbo	P	98	Engine (8hr)
DNF	LM-GT1	51	(France) Viper Team ORECA	(France) Dominique Dupuy (United Kingdom) Perry McCarthy (United Kingdom) Justin Bell	Dodge Viper GTS-R	Chrysler 356/T6 8.0L V10	M	96	Engine (13hr)
DNF	LM-GT1	55	(Germany) Roock Racing Team	(France) Jean-Pierre Jarier (Spain) Jesús Pareja (United Kingdom) Dominic Chappell	Porsche 911 GT2 Evo	Porsche M64/83 3.6L F6 twin turbo	M	93	Engine (12hr)
DNF	LM-GT1*	56	(France) Ferté Pilot Racing (private entrant)	(France) Michel Ferté (France) Olivier Thévenin (France) Nicolas Leboissetier	Ferrari F40 LM	Ferrari F120B 3.5L V8 twin turbo	M	93	Engine/ Fire (10hr)
DNF	LM P1/C90	2	(Germany) Kremer Racing	(South Africa) George Fouché (Sweden) Stanley Dickens (United States) Steve Fossett	Kremer K8	Porsche 935/76 3.0L F6 twin turbo	G	58	Accident (5hr)
DNF	LM-GT2	73	(Switzerland) Elf Haberthur Racing (private entrant)	(Belgium) Michel Neugarten (Switzerland) Toni Seiler (France) Bruno Ilien	Porsche 911 GT2	Porsche M64/81 3.6L F6 twin turbo	D	46	Gearbox (5hr)
DNF	LM-GT2	81	(United Kingdom) Team Marcos	(Netherlands) Cor Euser (Brazil) Thomas Erdos (France) Pascal Dro	Marcos Mantara 600LM	Chevrolet LT5 6.1L V8	D	40	Engine (5hr)
DNF	LM-GT1	45	(Italy) Igol Ennea SRL	(France) Jean-Marc Gounon (France) Éric Bernard (France) Paul Belmondo	Ferrari F40 GTE	Ferrari F120B 3.6L V8 twin turbo	P	40	Electrics (5hr)
DNF	LM-GT2	70	(United Kingdom) EMKA Racing / S. O'Rourke (private entrant)	(United Kingdom) Steve O'Rourke (United Kingdom) Guy Holmes (United Kingdom) Soames Langston	Porsche 911 GT2	Porsche M64/81 3.6L F6 twin turbo	D	32	Engine (4hr)
DNF	IMSA-WSC	18	(United States) Team Scandia (United States) Rocketsports Racing	(United States) Andy Evans (Spain) Fermín Vélez (France) Yvan Muller	Ferrari 333 SP	Ferrari F130E 4.0L V12	P	31	Out of fuel (4hr)

=== Did not start ===
Pos	Class	No	Team	Drivers	Chassis	Engine	Tyre	Reason
DNS	LM P2	9	(France) Didier Bonnet	(France) Jean-Claude Basso (France) Edouard Sezionale (France) Thierry Lecerf	Debora LMP296	Cosworth BDG 2.0L S4 turbo	**M**	Engine
DNS	LM-GT2	72	(Switzerland) Stadler Motorsport	(Switzerland) Enzo Calderari (Switzerland) Lilian Bryner (Germany) Ulrich Richter	Porsche 911 GT2	Porsche M64/81 3.6L F6 twin turbo	**P**	Practice accident
Res	LM-GT1	32	(France) Legeay Sports (private entrant)	(France) William David (France) Sébastien Enjolras (France) Arnaud Trévisiol	Renault Sport Spider V6 Coupé	Renault PRV 3.0L V6 twin turbo	**D**	Reserve Entry
Res	LM-GT1	40	(France) BBA Compétition	(France) Jean-Luc Maury-Laribière (France) Emmanuel Clérico (Switzerland) Laurent Lécuyer	Venturi 600S-LM	Renault PRV 3.0L V6 twin turbo	**M**	Reserve Entry

=== Class winners ===
Class	Winning car	Winning drivers
LM-P1/C90	#7 TWR-Porsche WSC95	Jones / Reuter / Wurz
LM-P2	#20 Kudzu DLM	Downing / Terada / Fréon
IMSA-WSC	no finishers	
LM-GT1	#25 Porsche 911 GT1	Wollek / Stuck / Boutsen
LM-GT2	#79 Porsche 911 GT2	Kelleners / Eichmann / Martinolle

== Statistics ==
Taken from Quentin Spurring's book, officially licensed by the ACO

- Pole Position – P. Martini, #8 TWR-Porsche WSC95 - 3:46.7; 216.0 km/h (134.2 mph)
- Fastest Lap – E. van der Poele, #17 Ferrari 333 SP – 3:47.0; 215.7 km/h (134.0 mph)
- Winning Distance – 4,814.4 km (2,991.5 mi)
- Winner's Average Speed – 200.6 km/h (124.6 mph)
- Attendance - 168000
