= Harrods Group =

British holding company

Harrods Group (Holding) Limited
- Type: Private
- Industry: Retail
- Genre: Department stores
- Founded: 1849; 177 years ago in London, England (Harrods department store); 1889; 137 years ago (Harrod's Stores Limited); 7 November 2006; 19 years ago (Harrods Group)
- Founder: Charles Henry Harrod
- Headquarters: London, England, UK
- Products: Quality and luxury goods
- Revenue: ▲£1 billion (2017)
- Operating income: ▲£253.3 million (2017)
- Net income: ▲£233.2 million (2017)
- Owner: Qatar Investment Authority (2010–present)
- Number of employees: ▲4,000 (2019)
- Subsidiaries: Harrods Estates; Harrods Interior Design; Harrods Aviation
- Website: harrods.com/harrods-group

Harrods Group (Holding) Limited, doing business as the Harrods Group, is a British holding company that owns the Harrods luxury department store in Knightsbridge, London, England. The original Harrods store was founded in 1849 by Charles Henry Harrod, and the first holding company, Harrod's Stores Limited, was formed and listed on the London Stock Exchange in 1889. It was acquired by and merged into the House of Fraser in 1959, which itself was acquired by the Fayed brothers and became a privately held company in 1985. When the House of Fraser was relisted on the stock exchange, the Harrods business was split off to remain privately held in 1994. The present-day Harrods Group was established by the Fayed brothers in 2006. It was sold to the Qatar Investment Authority, the sovereign wealth fund of Qatar, in 2010.

The Harrods Group is headquartered in Hammersmith, London. Beyond the flagship department store, it has operated Harrods-branded specialty shops in the United Kingdom, airports, and cruise ships. It has also applied the brand name to non-retail enterprises including Harrods Estates and Harrods Aviation.

== History ==
Harrods opened its first and only foreign branch in Buenos Aires, Argentina in 1914. It became independent of the British shop in the late 1940s, but continued to trade under the Harrods name, for many years the only Harrods outside Britain. The Harrods Furniture Depository was also built in Barnes, near Hammersmith Bridge in 1914.

A Harrods shop opened on board the RMS Queen Mary in Long Beach, California in 1990, which was then owned by the Walt Disney Company. That year, it gave right to Duty Free International for a licence to operate a Harrods Signature Shop at Toronto Pearson International Airport's Terminal 3 (closed shortly after) In 1997, an English court issued an injunction to restrain the Buenos Aires Harrods store from trading under the Harrods name, but the House of Lords in 1998 dismissed Fayed's lawsuit. The following year, the store in Buenos Aires closed after racking up large amounts of debt. There had been offers to buy the store from Falabella, El Corte Inglés, Printemps and more but Atilio Gilbertoni the owner of Harrods in Buenos Aires did not accept the offers as he wanted to keep the controlling stake in the brand.

A Harrods shop opened on board the Queen Elizabeth 2, owned by the Cunard Line, in 2000. The Harrods "102" shop opened opposite the main shop in Brompton Road in 2006, and featured concessions like Krispy Kreme and Yo! Sushi, as well as florists, a herbalist, a masseur, and an oxygen spa; it closed in 2013. A location at Heathrow Airport (Terminal 5) opened in 2008.

The company looked at the possibility of expanding to China and opening a new shop in Shanghai in 2010. Managing director Michael Ward stated that "there are other areas of the world where we could operate profitably." The number of Chinese shoppers visiting Harrods was increasing, and the average spent by a Chinese shopper was three times that of any other nationality. Harrods Bank, having operated since 1893, was sold to Tandem and rebranded to Tandem Bank in 2017.

After lockdowns and restriction during the COVID-19 pandemic, Harrods made a loss of £68 million in 2020, reduced staff numbers, paid no dividend to its owners and said that no dividend was likely for another two years, and faced a strike by dozens of restaurant workers.

=== Department store acquisitions ===
List of department stores acquired by Harrods Limited
Name	Year founded	Year acquired	Year defunct	Notes
D H Evans	1893	1928	2001	Rebranded as House of Fraser
Dickins & Jones	1835	1914	2007	Rebranded as House of Fraser
John Walsh	1875	1946	1987	Rebranded as House of Fraser
Kendals	1836	1919	2005	Briefly renamed Harrods in the 1920s; rebranded as House of Fraser
Rackhams	1881	1955	2000	Rebranded as House of Fraser
Swan & Edgar	1812	1920	1982	
Walter Carter Ltd		1920		
William Henderson & Co		1949		

== Retail enterprises ==
=== Harrods store locations ===
List of Harrods store locations
Ceremonial county	Borough or district	Property name	Year opened	Year closed	Notes
Buenos Aires	Retiro	Harrods Buenos Aires	1912 or 1914	1998	Disassociated in the 1940s or 1960 or licence cancelled in 1985
California (Note: U.S. state)	Long Beach (Note: U.S. city)	RMS Queen Mary	1990		
Frankfurt am Main	Flughafen	Frankfurt Airport		2003	
Greater London	Hillingdon	Heathrow Airport	2008	—N/a	Located in terminals 2, 3, 4, and 5
Greater London	Knightsbridge	Harrods	1849	—N/a	Namesake and flagship property
Greater London	Knightsbridge	Harrods 102	2006	2013	Convenience store
Greater London	White City	Westfield London	2020	2021	Harrods Outlet during COVID-19 pandemic
Hampshire	Southampton	Queen Elizabeth 2	1984	1996	
Hampshire	Southampton	Queen Elizabeth 2	2000	2008	Ship decommissioned
Kuala Lumpur	Sepang	Kuala Lumpur International Airport	2000	2018	
Lisbon	Olivais	Lisbon Airport			
Ontario (Note: Canadian province)	Mississauga (Note: Canadian city)	Toronto Pearson International Airport	1991	1992	Previously located in terminal 3
Vienna	Schwechat	Vienna International Airport		2003	
West Sussex	Crawley	Gatwick Airport	2013	—N/a	Located in North and South terminals
Shanghai	Jing’an	HKRI Taikoo Hui	2020	2026	

=== H Beauty ===
H Beauty
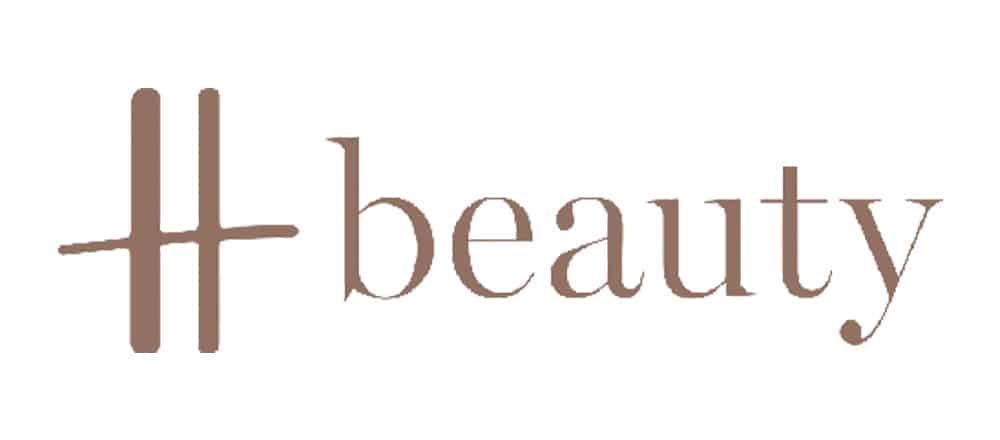
- Type: Subsidiary
- Industry: Cosmetics
- Founded: 17 September 2020; 5 years ago
- Number of locations: 5 (2024)
- Area served: United Kingdom
- Products: Cosmetics; skincare; fragrances; beauty products; haircare products
- Parent: Harrods Group
- Website: Official website

H Beauty is a beauty store chain that operates exclusively outside of London city limits, with locations spanning between 23,000 square feet (2,100 m^{2}) and 30,200 square feet (2,810 m^{2}) of selling space. It is designed to gain market share beyond the reach of the flagship Harrods store.

The flagship Harrods department store unveiled its renovated 90,000-square-foot (8,400 m^{2}) beauty department and 9,000-square-foot (840 m^{2}) skincare department in June and October 2019, respectively. In November 2019, the group announced H Beauty as "a major extension to [their] current beauty business" that underscored their confidence in the beauty industry in the United Kingdom. Industry analysts stated that the specialty store concept was a defensive strategy in light of the retail apocalypse, which saw brick-and-mortar department stores disproportionately impacted.

The first location opened at the Lakeside Shopping Centre in Thurrock, Essex in September 2020, with four subsequent stores operating as of December 2024. The first location in Scotland (third overall) opened at St James Quarter in Edinburgh in December 2021.

H Beauty features beauty products from nearly 80 brands, compared to the nearly 250 brands carried at the flagship store. The target market consists of "younger, regional [customers]" that differs from the older, tourist traffic in Knightsbridge. Selling space ranges between 21,000 square feet (2,000 m^{2}) at St James Quarter in Edinburgh, and 30,200 square feet (2,810 m^{2}) at MetroCentre in Gateshead, Tyne and Wear.

== Non-retail enterprises ==
Company	Industry
Harrods Aviation	Business travel
Harrods Estates	Estate agent
Harrods Interior Design	Interior design
