= Harrods Aviation =

Aviation company in the UK

Harrods Aviation Limited
- Type: Limited company
- Industry: Aviation
- Headquarters: Stansted, United Kingdom
- Number of locations: London Luton Airport, London Stansted Airport
- Website: www.harrodsaviation.com

Harrods Aviation Limited (formerly known as Metro Business Aviation Ltd) is a fixed-base operator and maintenance, repair, and operations service provider for business and corporate aviation in the United Kingdom with bases at London Luton Airport and London Stansted Airport.

== Air Harrods ==
Air Harrods Limited is the aircraft charter brokering arm of the Harrods company based at London Stansted Airport.

Customers vary immensely; news footage has shown Tony Blair travelling to the G8 summit on board an Air Harrods helicopter which was commissioned by MI5 to offset security concerns. The use of one Air Harrods helicopter was donated for a special of Challenge Anneka in 2007. The helicopter was used to transport some ill children to a choir performance.

On 7 May 2010, Air Harrods was sold as part of its parent group to a Qatari sovereign investment group in a combined deal worth £1.5bn.

== See also ==
- Air Harrods
- Harrods Group
- Harrods Estates
