= Harrods Estates =

British estate agent

- Type: Private
- Industry: Real estate
- Founded: 1897; 129 years ago, in London
- Headquarters: London, United Kingdom
- Services: Estate agency
- Website: www.harrodsestates.com

Harrods Estates is a London-based estate agent which offer services for buying, renting and managing property. Harrods Estates was started in 1897 and has expanded gradually since then. In 2005 a second office was opened in Mayfair then in 2013 a third office opened in Chelsea. In May 2015 a fourth office opened in Kensington Church Street.

== History ==
Harrods Estates, part of the Harrods group (Harrods, Harrods Aviation, Air Harrods and Harrods Corporate Services), were founded in 1897 and occupied a discreet position on the ground floor of the main Harrods building before moving three times between 1904 and 1908 as the team expanded in size from two employees to 20.

In 1919 the office moved across the road to 62-64 Brompton Road and provided an additional Auction Hall in the floor above, but in 1944 the office suffered a direct strike by a V-I Flying Bomb also known as a 'doodlebug' which demolished the building. However, close to 300,000 packets of papers survived and a temporary move to the Wholesale office on Hans Crescent meant not a single day of work was lost.

Harrods Estates relocated its headquarters two more times to Basil Street, then Park Lane, London before making their last move in 2001 when they returned to Brompton Road, this time number 82 - giving them a location directly opposite the main store and just yards from their original premises.

== Services ==
Harrods Estates specialise in prime central London properties. They currently have four offices located in Knightsbridge, Mayfair, Chelsea and Kensington which serve those areas

- Residential Sales
- Residential Lettings
- Developments
- Property Management
- Asset Management
- Russian Desk - providing a translation service
- Middle Eastern Desk - providing a translation service

Clients can be referred to additional relevant services offered by Harrods, including:

- The Studio - Harrods Interior Design service.
- By Appointment - a personal shopping service provided within Harrods by advance booking only.

== Expansion ==
Between 1937 and 1980, Harrods Estates opened in a further six locations which have since closed, four within the UK and two international offices.

In 2005 it opened a second office at 61 Park Lane, Mayfair which remains today.

2013 saw the launch of a third office, located in Chelsea, London.

2015 saw further expansion with a fourth office at Kensington Church Street, Kensington, London

== See also ==
- Harrods
- Air Harrods
- Harrods Aviation
