= 4 Hours of Le Castellet =

Sports car race held in Le Castellet, France

- Venue: Circuit Paul Ricard
- First race: 1970
- Distance: 1000km
- Laps: 171
- Duration: 6 hours
- Previous names: Trophée Paul Ricard
- Most wins (driver): Jean-Pierre Jarier (3)
- Most wins (team): Bentley Team M-Sport (3)
- Most wins (manufacturer): Oreca (11)

The 4 Hours of Le Castellet is an endurance race for sports cars held at Circuit Paul Ricard in Le Castellet, France. The race began in 1970 as a round of the European 2-Litre Sportscar Championship, and World Sportscar Championship rounds were held in 1974 and 1977. The race was a French national championship race in the 1980s. It was revived in 1998 by the International Sports Racing Series and again in 2010 by the Le Mans Series as an 8-hour race. In 2015, the event returned to its 1000 km format making it only the second time to use that distance since 1974.

Depending on the class-type and the year run, the race has been run as a 2 hour, 2.5 hour, 3 hour, 4 hour, 6 hour or 8 hour event, or as a 200 mile, 225 km, 500 km or 1,000 km event – as shown in the race results in the tables below.

== Results ==
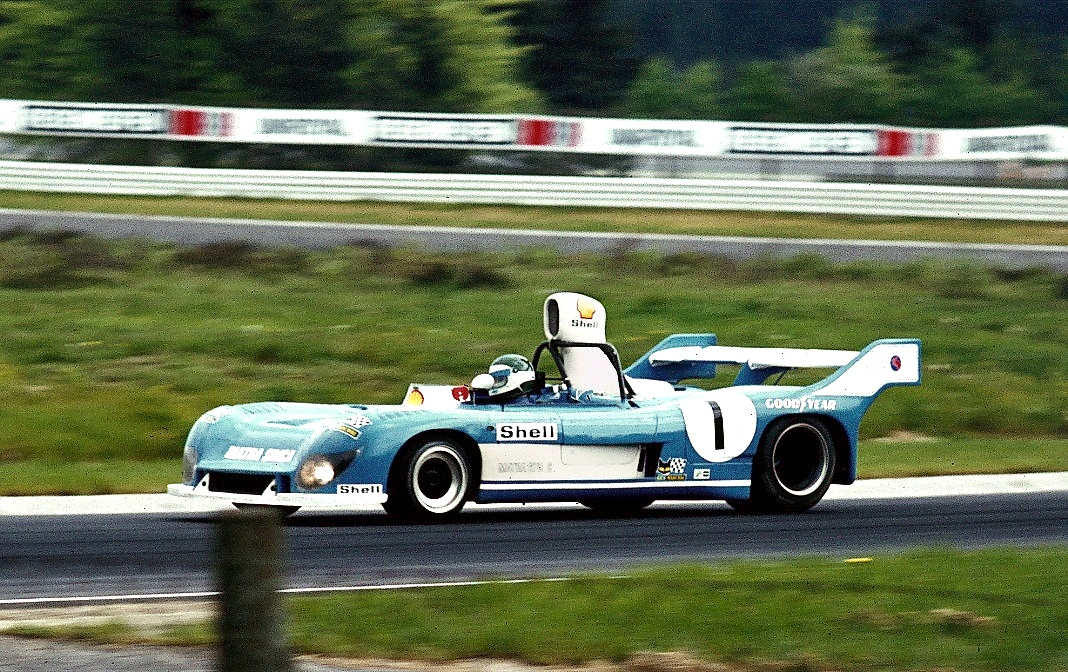
1974 winners Jean-Pierre Jarier and Jean-Pierre Beltoise's Matra (pictured at the Nürburgring).

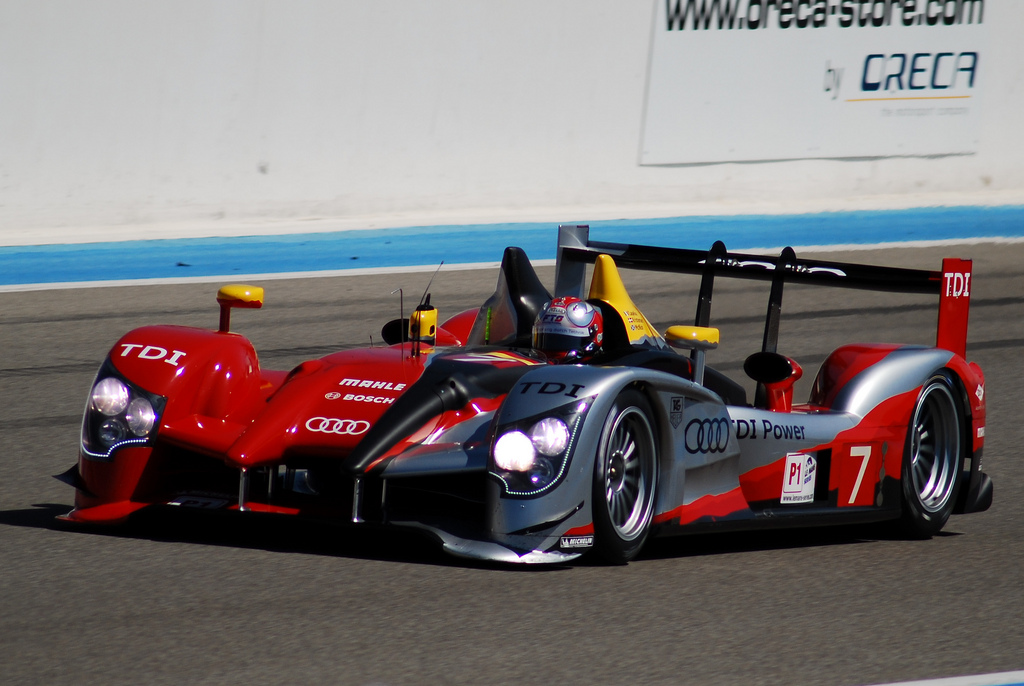
2010 winners Rinaldo Capello and Allan McNish's Audi R15 TDI Plus.

=== Sports car races ===
Year	Overall winner(s)	Entrant	Car	Distance/Duration	Race title	Championship	Report
1970	(United Kingdom) Brian Redman	(United Kingdom) Chevron Cars Ltd	Chevron B16	200 mi (320 km)	Trophée International Paul Ricard	European 2-Litre Championship	report
1971	(Austria) Helmut Marko (France) Jean-Pierre Jabouille	(West Germany) Karl von Wendt Racing	Lola T212	3 hours	Trophée Paul Ricard	European 2-Litre Championship	report
1972	(France) Gérard Larrousse	(Monaco) Radio Monte Carlo	Lola T210	2 hours	Trophée Paul Ricard	European 2-Litre Championship	report
1973	(United Kingdom) John Lepp	(United Kingdom) Red Rose Racing	Chevron B23	2 hours	Trophée Paul Ricard	European 2-Litre Championship	report
1974	(France) Alain Cudini	Equipe Switzerland Archambeaud	Alpine A441	225 km (140 mi)	Trophée d'Europe	European 2-Litre Championship	report
1974	(France) Jean-Pierre Beltoise (France) Jean-Pierre Jarier	(France) Equipe Gitanes	Matra-Simca MS670C	1,000 km (620 mi)	1000 Km Le Castellet	World Championship for Makes	report
1975–1976: Not held
1977	(France) Jean-Pierre Jarier (Italy) Arturo Merzario	(Italy) Autodelta SpA	Alfa Romeo T33/SC/12	500 km (310 mi)	500 Km Paul Ricard	World Sportscar Championship (Group 6)	report
1978–1997: Not held
1998	(Belgium) Didier Theys (Switzerland) Fredy Lienhard	(Switzerland) Horag-Lista Racing	Ferrari 333 SP	2 hours, 30 minutes	2 hours, 30 minutes of Paul Ricard	International Sports Racing Series	report
1999–2009: Not held
2010	(Italy) Rinaldo Capello (United Kingdom) Allan McNish	(Germany) Audi Sport Team Joest	Audi R15 TDI	8 hours	8 Heures du Castellet	Le Mans Series	report
2011	(France) Emmanuel Collard (France) Christophe Tinseau (France) Julien Jousse	(France) Pescarolo Team	Pescarolo 01 Evo	6 hours	6 Heures du Castellet	Le Mans Series	report
2012	(France) Pierre Thiriet (Switzerland) Mathias Beche	(France) Thiriet by TDS Racing	Oreca 03	6 hours	6 Heures du Castellet	European Le Mans Series	report
2013	(New Zealand) Brendon Hartley (Switzerland) Jonathan Hirschi	(Republic of Ireland) Murphy Prototypes	Oreca 03	3 hours	3 Hours of Le Castellet	European Le Mans Series	report
2014	(Austria) Christian Klien (Switzerland) Gary Hirsch (France) Pierre Ragues	(Switzerland) Newblood by Morand Racing	Morgan LMP2	4 hours	4 Hours of Le Castellet	European Le Mans Series	report
2015	(Switzerland) Gary Hirsch (United Kingdom) Jon Lancaster (Sweden) Björn Wirdheim	(United Kingdom) Greaves Motorsport	Gibson 015S	4 hours	4 Hours of Le Castellet	European Le Mans Series	report
2016	(Switzerland) Mathias Beche (United Kingdom) Mike Conway (France) Pierre Thiriet	(France) Thiriet by TDS Racing	Oreca 05	4 hours	4 Hours of Le Castellet	European Le Mans Series	report
2017	(Russia) Matevos Isaakyan (Russia) Egor Orudzhev	(Russia) SMP Racing	Dallara P217	4 hours	4 Hours of Le Castellet	European Le Mans Series	report
2018	(France) Norman Nato (France) Paul Petit (France) Olivier Pla	(Spain) Racing Engineering	Oreca 07	4 hours	4 Hours of Le Castellet	European Le Mans Series	report
2019	(Australia) James Allen (United Kingdom) Ben Hanley (Sweden) Henrik Hedman	(United States) DragonSpeed	Oreca 07	4 hours	4 Hours of Le Castellet	European Le Mans Series	report
2020 (4 Hours)	(United Kingdom) Alex Brundle (United States) Will Owen (Netherlands) Job van Uitert	(United Kingdom) United Autosports	Oreca 07	4 hours	4 Hours of Le Castellet	European Le Mans Series	report
2020 (Le Castellet 240)	(United Kingdom) Philip Hanson (Portugal) Filipe Albuquerque	(United Kingdom) United Autosports	Oreca 07	4 hours	Le Castellet 240	European Le Mans Series	report
2021	(Argentina) Franco Colapinto (Russia) Roman Rusinov (Netherlands) Nyck de Vries	(Russia) G-Drive Racing	Aurus 01	4 hours	4 Hours of Le Castellet	European Le Mans Series	report
2022	(Italy) Lorenzo Colombo (Switzerland) Louis Delétraz (Austria) Ferdinand Habsburg	(Italy) Prema Racing	Oreca 07	4 hours	4 Hours of Le Castellet	European Le Mans Series	report
2023	(Australia) James Allen (United Kingdom) Alex Lynn (Barbados) Kyffin Simpson	(Portugal) Algarve Pro Racing	Oreca 07	4 hours	4 Hours of Le Castellet	European Le Mans Series	report
2024	(Mexico) Sebastián Álvarez (France) Tom Dillmann (France) Vladislav Lomko	(Poland) Inter Europol Competition	Oreca 07	4 hours	4 Hours of Le Castellet	European Le Mans Series	report
2025	(United Kingdom) Jamie Chadwick (France) Mathys Jaubert (Spain) Daniel Juncadella	(France) IDEC Sport	Oreca 07	4 hours	4 Hours of Le Castellet	European Le Mans Series	report
2026 (ELMS)	(United Kingdom) Ben Hanley (Australia) Griffin Peebles (Switzerland) Grégoire Saucy	(United Kingdom) United Autosports	Oreca 07	4 hours	4 Hours of Le Castellet	European Le Mans Series	report
2026 (AsLMS, Race 1)	(Denmark) Nicklas Nielsen (China) Yifei Ye (Argentina) Luis Pérez Companc	(Italy) AF Corse	Ferrari 499P	4 hours	4 Hours of Le Castellet by ALMS	Asian Le Mans Series	report
2026 (AsLMS, Race 2)	(Denmark) Nicklas Nielsen (China) Yifei Ye (Argentina) Luis Pérez Companc	(Italy) AF Corse	Ferrari 499P	4 hours	4 Hours of Le Castellet by ALMS	Asian Le Mans Series	report

=== GT races ===
Year	Overall winner(s)	Entrant	Car	Distance/Duration	Race title	Championship	Report
1994	(France) Bob Wollek (France) Jean-Pierre Jarier (Spain) Jesús Pareja	(France) Larbre Compétition	Porsche 911 Turbo S LM-GT	4 Hours	4 Hours of Paul Ricard	BPR Global GT Series	Report
1995	(United Kingdom) Ray Bellm (Brazil) Maurizio Sandro Sala	(United Kingdom) Gulf Racing GTC	McLaren F1 GTR	4 Hours	4 Hours of Le Castellet	BPR Global GT Series	Report
1996	(United Kingdom) Ray Bellm (United Kingdom) James Weaver	(United Kingdom) Gulf Racing GTC	McLaren F1 GTR	4 Hours	4 Hours of Le Castellet	BPR Global GT Series	Results
1997: Not held
1998	(United Kingdom) Geoff Lister (United Kingdom) Maxwell Beaverbrook (United Kingdom) Barrie Williams	(United Kingdom) #9 BVB Motorsport	Porsche 911 GT2 Evo	4 Hours	4 Hours of Paul Ricard	GTR Euroseries	Results
1999–2005: Not held
2006	(Netherlands) Mike Hezemans (Belgium) Bert Longin (Belgium) Anthony Kumpen	(Belgium) GLPK-Carsport	Chevrolet Corvette C6.R	500 km	500 km of Paul Ricard	FIA GT Championship	report
2007–2008: Not held
2009	(Brazil) Enrique Bernoldi (Brazil) Roberto Streit	Sangari Team Brazil	Chevrolet Corvette C6.R	2 Hours	2 Hours of Paul Ricard	FIA GT Championship	report
2010–2011: Not held
2012	(Monaco) Stéphane Ortelli (Germany) Christopher Mies (Germany) Christopher Haase	(Belgium) Belgian Audi Club WRT	Audi R8 LMS ultra	3 Hours	3 Hours of Paul Ricard	Blancpain Endurance Series	report
2013	(Belgium) Bas Leinders (Belgium) Maxime Martin (Netherlands) Yelmer Buurman	(Belgium) Marc VDS Racing Team	BMW Z4 GT3	3 Hours	3 Hours of Paul Ricard	Blancpain Endurance Series	report
2014	(United Kingdom) Steven Kane (United Kingdom) Guy Smith (United Kingdom) Andy Meyrick	(United Kingdom) M-Sport Bentley	Bentley Continental GT3	3 Hours	3 Hours of Paul Ricard	Blancpain Endurance Series	report
2015	(Belgium) Wolfgang Reip (Japan) Katsumasa Chiyo (United Kingdom) Alex Buncombe	(United Kingdom) Nissan GT Academy Team RJN	Nissan GT-R Nismo GT3	1000 Km	1000 km Paul Ricard	Blancpain Endurance Series	report
2016	(France) Côme Ledogar (New Zealand) Shane van Gisbergen (United Kingdom) Rob Bell	(United Kingdom) Garage 59	McLaren 650S GT3	1000 Km	1000 km Paul Ricard	Blancpain Endurance Series	report
2017	(Belgium) Maxime Soulet (Spain) Andy Soucek (Monaco) Vincent Abril	(United Kingdom) Bentley Team M-Sport	Bentley Continental GT3	1000 Km	1000 km Paul Ricard	Blancpain GT Series Endurance Cup	report
2018	(Spain) Albert Costa (Austria) Christian Klien (Germany) Marco Seefried	(Switzerland) Emil Frey Lexus Racing	Lexus RC F GT3	1000 Km	1000 km Paul Ricard	Blancpain GT Series Endurance Cup	report
2019	(France) Jules Gounon (United Kingdom) Steven Kane (South Africa) Jordan Pepper	(United Kingdom) Bentley Team M-Sport	Bentley Continental GT3	1000 Km	1000 km Paul Ricard	Blancpain GT Series Endurance Cup	report
2020	(United Kingdom) Tom Blomqvist (France) Côme Ledogar (Italy) Alessandro Pier Guidi	(Italy) AF Corse	Ferrari 488 GT3	1000 Km	1000 km Paul Ricard	GT World Challenge Europe Endurance Cup	report
2021	(Australia) Matthew Campbell (New Zealand) Earl Bamber (France) Mathieu Jaminet	(United Arab Emirates) GPX Racing	Porsche 911 GT3 R	1000 Km	1000 km Paul Ricard	GT World Challenge Europe Endurance Cup	report
2022	(Italy) Antonio Fuoco (Italy) Davide Rigon (Brazil) Daniel Serra	(Italy) Iron Lynx	Ferrari 488 GT3	1000 Km	1000 km Paul Ricard	GT World Challenge Europe Endurance Cup	report
2023	Timur Boguslavskiy (Andorra) Jules Gounon (Switzerland) Raffaele Marciello	(France) AKKodis ASP Team	Mercedes-AMG GT3 Evo	1000 Km	1000 km Paul Ricard	GT World Challenge Europe Endurance Cup	report
2024	(Brazil) Augusto Farfus (United Kingdom) Dan Harper (Germany) Max Hesse	(Germany) Rowe Racing	BMW M4 GT3	3 Hours	3 hours of Paul Ricard	GT World Challenge Europe Endurance Cup	report
2025	(Belgium) Ugo de Wilde (South Africa) Kelvin van der Linde (Belgium) Charles Weerts	(Belgium) Team WRT	BMW M4 GT3 Evo	6 Hours	6 Hours of Paul Ricard	GT World Challenge Europe Endurance Cup	report
