= 1996 BPR 4 Hours of Monza =

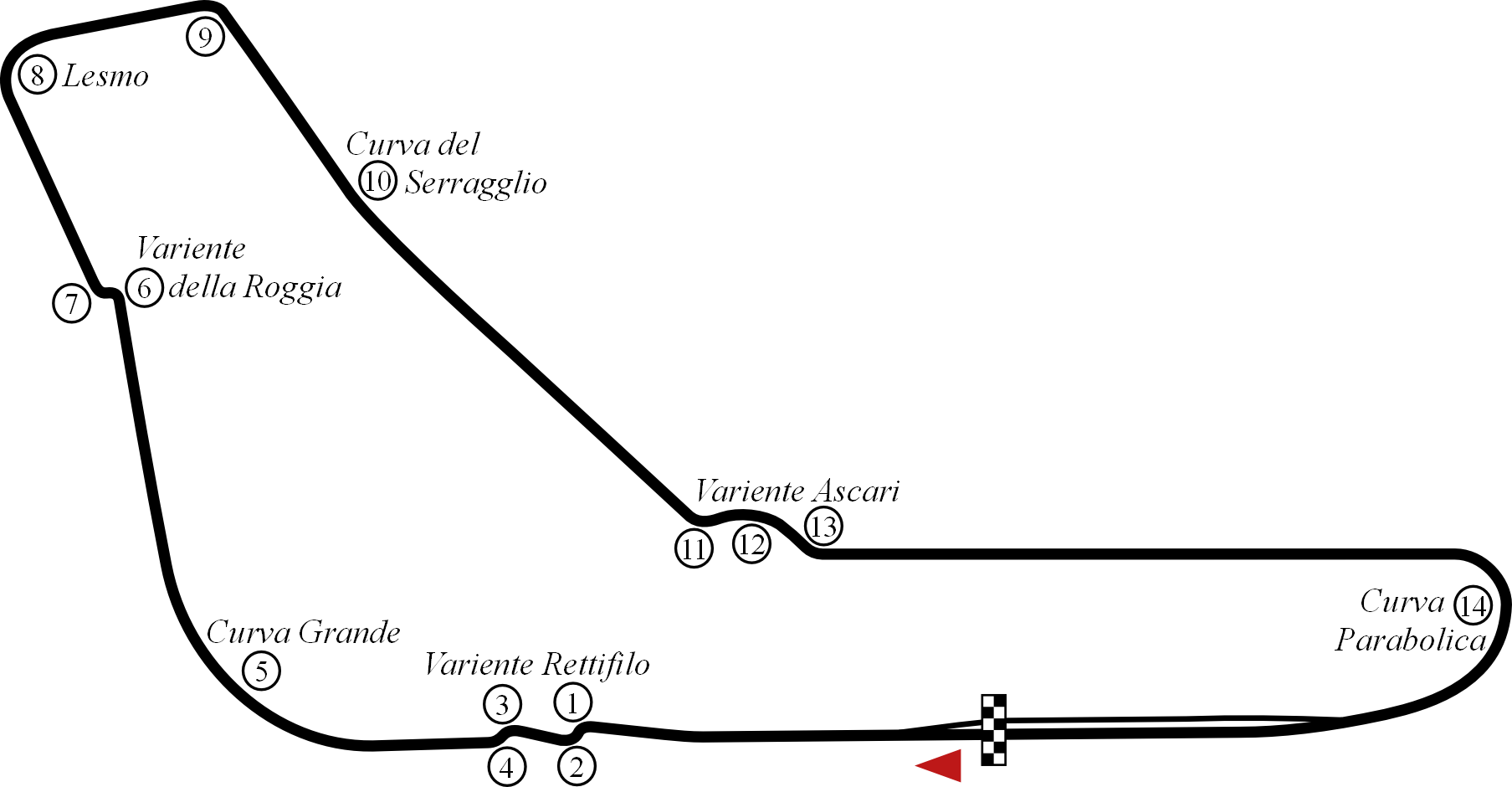
Layout of the Autodromo Nazionale Monza (1995-1999)

The 1996 BPR 4 Hours of Monza was the second race of the 1996 BPR Global GT Series. It was run at the Autodromo Nazionale Monza on 24 March 1996.

== Official results ==
Class winners in bold. Cars failing to complete 75% of winner's distance marked as Not Classified (NC).

Pos	Class	No	Team	Drivers	Chassis	Tyre	Laps
Pos	Class	No	Team	Drivers	Engine	Tyre	Laps
1	**GT1**	**1**	**(United Kingdom) West Competition (United Kingdom) David Price Racing**	**(Denmark) John Nielsen (Germany) Thomas Bscher**	**McLaren F1 GTR**	**G**	**127**
1	**GT1**	**1**	**(United Kingdom) West Competition (United Kingdom) David Price Racing**	**(Denmark) John Nielsen (Germany) Thomas Bscher**	**BMW S70 6.1L V12**	**G**	**127**
2	GT1	9	(France) Franck Muller Watches (France) Giroix Racing Team	(France) Fabien Giroix (Switzerland) Jean-Denis Délétraz (France) Didier Cottaz	McLaren F1 GTR	**MI**	125
2	GT1	9	(France) Franck Muller Watches (France) Giroix Racing Team	(France) Fabien Giroix (Switzerland) Jean-Denis Délétraz (France) Didier Cottaz	BMW S70 6.1L V12	**MI**	125
3	**GT2**	**56**	**(Germany) Roock Racing**	**(Switzerland) Bruno Eichmann (Germany) Ralf Kelleners (Germany) Gerd Ruch**	**Porsche 911 GT2**	**MI**	**123**
3	**GT2**	**56**	**(Germany) Roock Racing**	**(Switzerland) Bruno Eichmann (Germany) Ralf Kelleners (Germany) Gerd Ruch**	**Porsche 3.6L Turbo Flat-6**	**MI**	**123**
4	GT2	64	(United Kingdom) Lanzante Motorsport	(United States) Paul Burdell (United Kingdom) Soames Langton (Sweden) Stanley Dickens	Porsche 911 GT2	**MI**	122
4	GT2	64	(United Kingdom) Lanzante Motorsport	(United States) Paul Burdell (United Kingdom) Soames Langton (Sweden) Stanley Dickens	Porsche 3.6L Turbo Flat-6	**MI**	122
5	GT2	96	(France) Larbre Compétition	(France) Patrice Goueslard (France) Jack Leconte (Germany) André Ahrlé	Porsche 911 GT2	**MI**	122
5	GT2	96	(France) Larbre Compétition	(France) Patrice Goueslard (France) Jack Leconte (Germany) André Ahrlé	Porsche 3.6L Turbo Flat-6	**MI**	122
6	GT2	65	(Germany) Roock Racing	(France) Guy Martinolle (France) Jean-Claude Lagniez (France) Philippe Albera	Porsche 911 GT2	**MI**	121
6	GT2	65	(Germany) Roock Racing	(France) Guy Martinolle (France) Jean-Claude Lagniez (France) Philippe Albera	Porsche 3.6L Turbo Flat-6	**MI**	121
7	GT2	54	(Netherlands) Bert Ploeg	(Netherlands) Bert Ploeg (Denmark) Kris Nissen	Porsche 911 GT2	?	121
7	GT2	54	(Netherlands) Bert Ploeg	(Netherlands) Bert Ploeg (Denmark) Kris Nissen	Porsche 3.6L Turbo Flat-6	?	121
8	GT2	92	(United Kingdom) New Hardware Parr Motorsport	(United Kingdom) Robert Nearn (France) Stéphane Ortelli	Porsche 911 GT2	**P**	121
8	GT2	92	(United Kingdom) New Hardware Parr Motorsport	(United Kingdom) Robert Nearn (France) Stéphane Ortelli	Porsche 3.6L Turbo Flat-6	**P**	121
9	GT2	83	(Netherlands) Marcos Racing International	(Netherlands) Cor Euser (Brazil) Thomas Erdos	Marcos LM600	**D**	119
9	GT2	83	(Netherlands) Marcos Racing International	(Netherlands) Cor Euser (Brazil) Thomas Erdos	Chevrolet 6.0L V8	**D**	119
10	GT1	16	(Austria) Karl Augustin	(Germany) Ernst Gschwender (Austria) Alfred Gramsel (Austria) Karl Augustin	Porsche 911 GT2 Cetoni	**G**	119
10	GT1	16	(Austria) Karl Augustin	(Germany) Ernst Gschwender (Austria) Alfred Gramsel (Austria) Karl Augustin	Porsche 3.6L Turbo Flat-6	**G**	119
11	GT2	77	(Germany) Seikel Motorsport	(Austria) Manfred Jurasz (Italy) Giuseppe Quargentan (Germany) Peter Seikel	Porsche 911 GT2	**P**	118
11	GT2	77	(Germany) Seikel Motorsport	(Austria) Manfred Jurasz (Italy) Giuseppe Quargentan (Germany) Peter Seikel	Porsche 3.6L Turbo Flat-6	**P**	118
12	GT2	50	(Switzerland) Stadler Motorsport	(Switzerland) Uwe Sick (Switzerland) Charles Margueron	Porsche 911 GT2	**P**	118
12	GT2	50	(Switzerland) Stadler Motorsport	(Switzerland) Uwe Sick (Switzerland) Charles Margueron	Porsche 3.6L Turbo Flat-6	**P**	118
13	GT2	93	(United Kingdom) New Hardware Parr Motorsport	(United Kingdom) Peter Owen (United Kingdom) Hugh Price (United Kingdom) John Robinson	Porsche 911 GT2	**P**	118
13	GT2	93	(United Kingdom) New Hardware Parr Motorsport	(United Kingdom) Peter Owen (United Kingdom) Hugh Price (United Kingdom) John Robinson	Porsche 3.6L Turbo Flat-6	**P**	118
14	GT2	52	(Germany) Krauss Rennsporttechnik	(Germany) Bernhard Müller (Germany) Michael Trunk	Porsche 911 GT2	**P**	117
14	GT2	52	(Germany) Krauss Rennsporttechnik	(Germany) Bernhard Müller (Germany) Michael Trunk	Porsche 3.6L Turbo Flat-6	**P**	117
15	GT2	58	(Italy) MC Motorsport	(Italy) Luca Canni-Ferrari (Italy) Massimo Monti	Ferrari F355 GT	?	116
15	GT2	58	(Italy) MC Motorsport	(Italy) Luca Canni-Ferrari (Italy) Massimo Monti	Ferrari F131 3.5L V8	?	116
16	GT2	63	(Italy) Roger Racing	(Italy) Ruggero Grassi (France) Ermanno Colombo	Porsche 993 Supercup	?	115
16	GT2	63	(Italy) Roger Racing	(Italy) Ruggero Grassi (France) Ermanno Colombo	Porsche 3.8L Flat-6	?	115
17	GT2	59	(France) Raymond Touroul	(France) Didier Ortion (France) Raymond Touroul (France) Jean-Louis Ricci	Porsche 911 GT2	?	114
17	GT2	59	(France) Raymond Touroul	(France) Didier Ortion (France) Raymond Touroul (France) Jean-Louis Ricci	Porsche 3.6L Turbo Flat-6	?	114
18	GT2	66	(United Kingdom) EMKA Racing	(United Kingdom) Steve O'Rourke (United Kingdom) Guy Holmes	Porsche 911 GT2	**D**	113
18	GT2	66	(United Kingdom) EMKA Racing	(United Kingdom) Steve O'Rourke (United Kingdom) Guy Holmes	Porsche 3.6L Turbo Flat-6	**D**	113
19	GT2	53	(Switzerland) Yellow Racing	(France) Christian Heinkelé (Switzerland) Henri-Louis Maunoir (Sweden) Tony Ring	Ferrari F355 GT	**MI**	113
19	GT2	53	(Switzerland) Yellow Racing	(France) Christian Heinkelé (Switzerland) Henri-Louis Maunoir (Sweden) Tony Ring	Ferrari F131 3.5L V8	**MI**	113
20	GT2	62	(Italy) Leanston Racing	(Italy) Luca Cattaneo (Italy) Alberto Mondinelli	Porsche 964 Carrera RS	?	112
20	GT2	62	(Italy) Leanston Racing	(Italy) Luca Cattaneo (Italy) Alberto Mondinelli	Porsche 3.6L Flat-6	?	112
21	GT1	49	(Germany) Freisinger Motorsport	(Germany) Wolfgang Kaufmann (Italy) Pietro Ferrero	Porsche 911 GT2 Evo	**G**	110
21	GT1	49	(Germany) Freisinger Motorsport	(Germany) Wolfgang Kaufmann (Italy) Pietro Ferrero	Porsche 3.6L Turbo Flat-6	**G**	110
22	GT2	51	(Germany) Proton Competition	(Germany) Peter Erl (Germany) Gerold Ried	Porsche 911 GT2	**P**	109
22	GT2	51	(Germany) Proton Competition	(Germany) Peter Erl (Germany) Gerold Ried	Porsche 3.6L Turbo Flat-6	**P**	109
23	GT2	99	(Switzerland) Elf Haberthur Racing	(France) Ferdinand de Lesseps (France) Philippe Charriol (Belgium) Michel Neugarten	Porsche 911 GT2	**P**	107
23	GT2	99	(Switzerland) Elf Haberthur Racing	(France) Ferdinand de Lesseps (France) Philippe Charriol (Belgium) Michel Neugarten	Porsche 3.6L Turbo Flat-6	**P**	107
24	GT2	30	(France) Quattro Pilotage	(France) Thierry Guiod (France) Patrick Pelissier	Porsche 911 Bi-Turbo	?	102
24	GT2	30	(France) Quattro Pilotage	(France) Thierry Guiod (France) Patrick Pelissier	Porsche 3.6L Turbo Flat-6	?	102
25 DNF	GT2	84	(Italy) Promosport Italia	(Italy) Giovanni Lavaggi (Italy) Renato Mastropietro (Italy) Vincenzo Polli	Porsche 911 GT2	**P**	119
25 DNF	GT2	84	(Italy) Promosport Italia	(Italy) Giovanni Lavaggi (Italy) Renato Mastropietro (Italy) Vincenzo Polli	Porsche 3.6L Turbo Flat-6	**P**	119
26 DNF	GT1	29	(Italy) Ferrari Club Italia (Italy) Ennea SRL	(Italy) Luca Drudi (Italy) Piero Nappi (Italy) Mauro Martini	Ferrari F40 GTE	**P**	115
26 DNF	GT1	29	(Italy) Ferrari Club Italia (Italy) Ennea SRL	(Italy) Luca Drudi (Italy) Piero Nappi (Italy) Mauro Martini	Ferrari 3.5L Turbo V8	**P**	115
27 DNF	GT2	85	(Italy) Gianluigi Locatelli	(Italy) Leonardo Maddalena (Italy) Gianluigi Locatelli	Porsche 993 Supercup	?	103
27 DNF	GT2	85	(Italy) Gianluigi Locatelli	(Italy) Leonardo Maddalena (Italy) Gianluigi Locatelli	Porsche 3.8L Flat-6	?	103
28 DNF	GT1	3	(United Kingdom) Harrods Mach One Racing (United Kingdom) David Price Racing	(United Kingdom) Andy Wallace (France) Olivier Grouillard	McLaren F1 GTR	**G**	92
28 DNF	GT1	3	(United Kingdom) Harrods Mach One Racing (United Kingdom) David Price Racing	(United Kingdom) Andy Wallace (France) Olivier Grouillard	BMW S70 6.1L V12	**G**	92
29 DNF	GT1	2	(United Kingdom) Gulf Racing (United Kingdom) GTC Motorsport	(United Kingdom) Ray Bellm (United Kingdom) James Weaver	McLaren F1 GTR	**MI**	88
29 DNF	GT1	2	(United Kingdom) Gulf Racing (United Kingdom) GTC Motorsport	(United Kingdom) Ray Bellm (United Kingdom) James Weaver	BMW S70 6.1L V12	**MI**	88
30 DNF	GT1	4	(Germany) Roock Racing	(France) Jean-Pierre Jarier (Germany) Altfrid Heger (Germany) Ralf Kelleners	Porsche 911 GT2 Evo	**MI**	80
30 DNF	GT1	4	(Germany) Roock Racing	(France) Jean-Pierre Jarier (Germany) Altfrid Heger (Germany) Ralf Kelleners	Porsche 3.6L Turbo Flat-6	**MI**	80
31 DNF	GT2	88	(Germany) Konrad Motorsport	(France) Michel Ligonnet (Austria) Helmut König (Switzerland) Toni Seiler	Porsche 911 GT2	**MI**	76
31 DNF	GT2	88	(Germany) Konrad Motorsport	(France) Michel Ligonnet (Austria) Helmut König (Switzerland) Toni Seiler	Porsche 3.6L Turbo Flat-6	**MI**	76
32 DNF	GT1	14	(Germany) Repsol Kremer Racing	(France) Christophe Bouchut (Spain) Tomas Saldaña	Porsche 911 GT2 Evo	**MI**	74
32 DNF	GT1	14	(Germany) Repsol Kremer Racing	(France) Christophe Bouchut (Spain) Tomas Saldaña	Porsche 3.6L Turbo Flat-6	**MI**	74
33 DNF	GT1	5	(France) Eric Graham	(France) Eric Graham (France) Michel Faraut (France) David Velay	Venturi 600 LM	**D**	67
33 DNF	GT1	5	(France) Eric Graham	(France) Eric Graham (France) Michel Faraut (France) David Velay	Renault PRV 3.0L Turbo V6	**D**	67
34 DNF	GT2	74	(Switzerland) Callaway Schweiz	(Switzerland) Kurt Huber (Switzerland) Hans Hauser (Germany) Seppi Wendlinger	Callaway Corvette Supernatural	?	66
34 DNF	GT2	74	(Switzerland) Callaway Schweiz	(Switzerland) Kurt Huber (Switzerland) Hans Hauser (Germany) Seppi Wendlinger	Chevrolet LT1 6.2L V8	?	66
35 DNF	GT1	11	(Germany) Konrad Motorsport	(Austria) Franz Konrad (France) Bob Wollek	Porsche 911 GT2 Evo	**MI**	57
35 DNF	GT1	11	(Germany) Konrad Motorsport	(Austria) Franz Konrad (France) Bob Wollek	Porsche 3.6L Turbo Flat-6	**MI**	57
36 DNF	GT2	60	(Germany) Oberbayern Motorsport	(Germany) Jurgen von Gartzen (Germany) Detlef Hübner	Porsche 911 GT2	**P**	51
36 DNF	GT2	60	(Germany) Oberbayern Motorsport	(Germany) Jurgen von Gartzen (Germany) Detlef Hübner	Porsche 3.6L Turbo Flat-6	**P**	51
37 DNF	GT2	90	(Italy) Robert Sikkens Racing	(Italy) Angelo Zadra (Italy) Maurizio Monforte	Porsche 911 GT2	**G**	50
37 DNF	GT2	90	(Italy) Robert Sikkens Racing	(Italy) Angelo Zadra (Italy) Maurizio Monforte	Porsche 3.6L Turbo Flat-6	**G**	50
38 DNF	GT1	28	(Italy) Ennea Igol	(France) Jean-Marc Gounon (France) Éric Bernard (France) Paul Belmondo	Ferrari F40 GTE	**P**	49
38 DNF	GT1	28	(Italy) Ennea Igol	(France) Jean-Marc Gounon (France) Éric Bernard (France) Paul Belmondo	Ferrari 3.5L Turbo V8	**P**	49
39 DNF	GT2	73	(United Kingdom) Morgan Motor Company	(United Kingdom) Charles Morgan (United Kingdom) William Wykeham	Morgan Plus 8 GTR	**D**	48
39 DNF	GT2	73	(United Kingdom) Morgan Motor Company	(United Kingdom) Charles Morgan (United Kingdom) William Wykeham	Rover V8 5.0L V8	**D**	48
40 DNF	GT1	20	(France) Venturi Team Lécuyer	(France) Emmanuel Clérico (France) Laurent Lécuyer (Switzerland) Philippe Favre	Venturi 600 SLM	**MI**	45
40 DNF	GT1	20	(France) Venturi Team Lécuyer	(France) Emmanuel Clérico (France) Laurent Lécuyer (Switzerland) Philippe Favre	Renault PRV 3.0L Turbo V6	**MI**	45
41 DNF	GT2	70	(France) Jean-François Véroux	(France) Jean-François Véroux (France) Jean-Yves Moine (France) Stéphane Leloup	Porsche 911 GT2	?	40
41 DNF	GT2	70	(France) Jean-François Véroux	(France) Jean-François Véroux (France) Jean-Yves Moine (France) Stéphane Leloup	Porsche 3.6L Turbo Flat-6	?	40
42 DNF	GT1	12	(France) Chardon des Dunes	(France) Patrick Vuillaume (France) Christian Pellieux (Germany) Andy Bovensiepen	Porsche 911 GT2 Evo	?	37
42 DNF	GT1	12	(France) Chardon des Dunes	(France) Patrick Vuillaume (France) Christian Pellieux (Germany) Andy Bovensiepen	Porsche 3.6L Turbo Flat-6	?	37
43 DNF	GT1	27	(Italy) Ennea Igol	(Sweden) Anders Olofsson (Italy) Luciano della Noce	Ferrari F40 GTE	**P**	35
43 DNF	GT1	27	(Italy) Ennea Igol	(Sweden) Anders Olofsson (Italy) Luciano della Noce	Ferrari 3.5L Turbo V8	**P**	35
44 DNF	GT1	8	(France) BBA Compétition	(France) Jean-Luc Maury-Laribière (Netherlands) Hans Hugenholtz (France) Marc Sourd	McLaren F1 GTR	**D**	33
44 DNF	GT1	8	(France) BBA Compétition	(France) Jean-Luc Maury-Laribière (Netherlands) Hans Hugenholtz (France) Marc Sourd	BMW S70 6.1L V12	**D**	33
45 DNF	GT2	76	(United Kingdom) Agusta Racing Team	(Italy) Sandro Munari (Italy) Marco Spinelli	Callaway Corvette Supernatural	**D**	30
45 DNF	GT2	76	(United Kingdom) Agusta Racing Team	(Italy) Sandro Munari (Italy) Marco Spinelli	Chevrolet LT1 6.2L V8	**D**	30
46 DNF	GT2	71	(France) Lotus Equipe (Italy) Scuderia Magnani	(France) Pascal Dro (France) Jean-Yves Pezant (Italy) Guido Dacco	Lotus Esprit S300	?	13
46 DNF	GT2	71	(France) Lotus Equipe (Italy) Scuderia Magnani	(France) Pascal Dro (France) Jean-Yves Pezant (Italy) Guido Dacco	Lotus 2.0L Turbo I4	?	13
47 DNF	GT1	21	(United Kingdom) Lotus Racing Team	(Netherlands) Mike Hezemans (United Kingdom) Alexander Portman	Lotus Esprit V8 Turbo	**MI**	13
47 DNF	GT1	21	(United Kingdom) Lotus Racing Team	(Netherlands) Mike Hezemans (United Kingdom) Alexander Portman	Lotus 3.5L Turbo V8	**MI**	13
48 DNF	GT2	55	(Switzerland) Stadler Motorsport	(Switzerland) Enzo Calderari (Switzerland) Lilian Bryner	Porsche 911 GT2	**P**	7
48 DNF	GT2	55	(Switzerland) Stadler Motorsport	(Switzerland) Enzo Calderari (Switzerland) Lilian Bryner	Porsche 3.6L Turbo Flat-6	**P**	7
49 DNF	GT1	48	(Germany) Freisinger Motorsport	(Switzerland) Clay Regazzoni (Italy) Fulvio Ballabio (France) Henri Pescarolo	Porsche 911 Bi-Turbo	**G**	7
49 DNF	GT1	48	(Germany) Freisinger Motorsport	(Switzerland) Clay Regazzoni (Italy) Fulvio Ballabio (France) Henri Pescarolo	Porsche 3.8L Turbo Flat-6	**G**	7
50 DNF	GT1	22	(United Kingdom) Lotus Racing Team	(Netherlands) Jan Lammers (United Kingdom) Perry McCarthy	Lotus Esprit V8 Turbo	**MI**	6
50 DNF	GT1	22	(United Kingdom) Lotus Racing Team	(Netherlands) Jan Lammers (United Kingdom) Perry McCarthy	Lotus 3.5L Turbo V8	**MI**	6
51 DNF	GT2	67	(United Kingdom) Simpson Engineering	(Italy) Raffaele Sangiuolo (Italy) Maurizio Lusuardi (Austria) Hans-Jörg Hofer	Porsche 911 GT2	?	5
51 DNF	GT2	67	(United Kingdom) Simpson Engineering	(Italy) Raffaele Sangiuolo (Italy) Maurizio Lusuardi (Austria) Hans-Jörg Hofer	Porsche 3.6L Turbo Flat-6	?	5
52 DNF	GT2	75	(United Kingdom) Agusta Racing Team	(Italy) Almo Coppelli (Italy) Rocky Agusta (Italy) Bruno Corradi	Callaway Corvette Supernatural	**D**	2
52 DNF	GT2	75	(United Kingdom) Agusta Racing Team	(Italy) Almo Coppelli (Italy) Rocky Agusta (Italy) Bruno Corradi	Chevrolet LT1 6.2L V8	**D**	2
DNS	GT1	6	(United Kingdom) Gulf Racing (United Kingdom) GTC Competition	(United Kingdom) Lindsay Owen-Jones (France) Pierre-Henri Raphanel	McLaren F1 GTR	**MI**	-
DNS	GT1	6	(United Kingdom) Gulf Racing (United Kingdom) GTC Competition	(United Kingdom) Lindsay Owen-Jones (France) Pierre-Henri Raphanel	BMW S70 6.1L V12	**MI**	-

== Statistics ==
- Pole Position - (France) Jean-Marc Gounon (#28 Ennea Igol) - 1:42.379
- Fastest Lap - (United Kingdom) Ray Bellm (#2 Gulf Racing) - 1:44.354

BPR Global GT Series
Previous race: 1996 BPR 4 Hours of Le Castellet	1996 season	Next race: 1996 BPR 4 Hours of Jarama
