= 1996 BPR 4 Hours of Le Castellet =

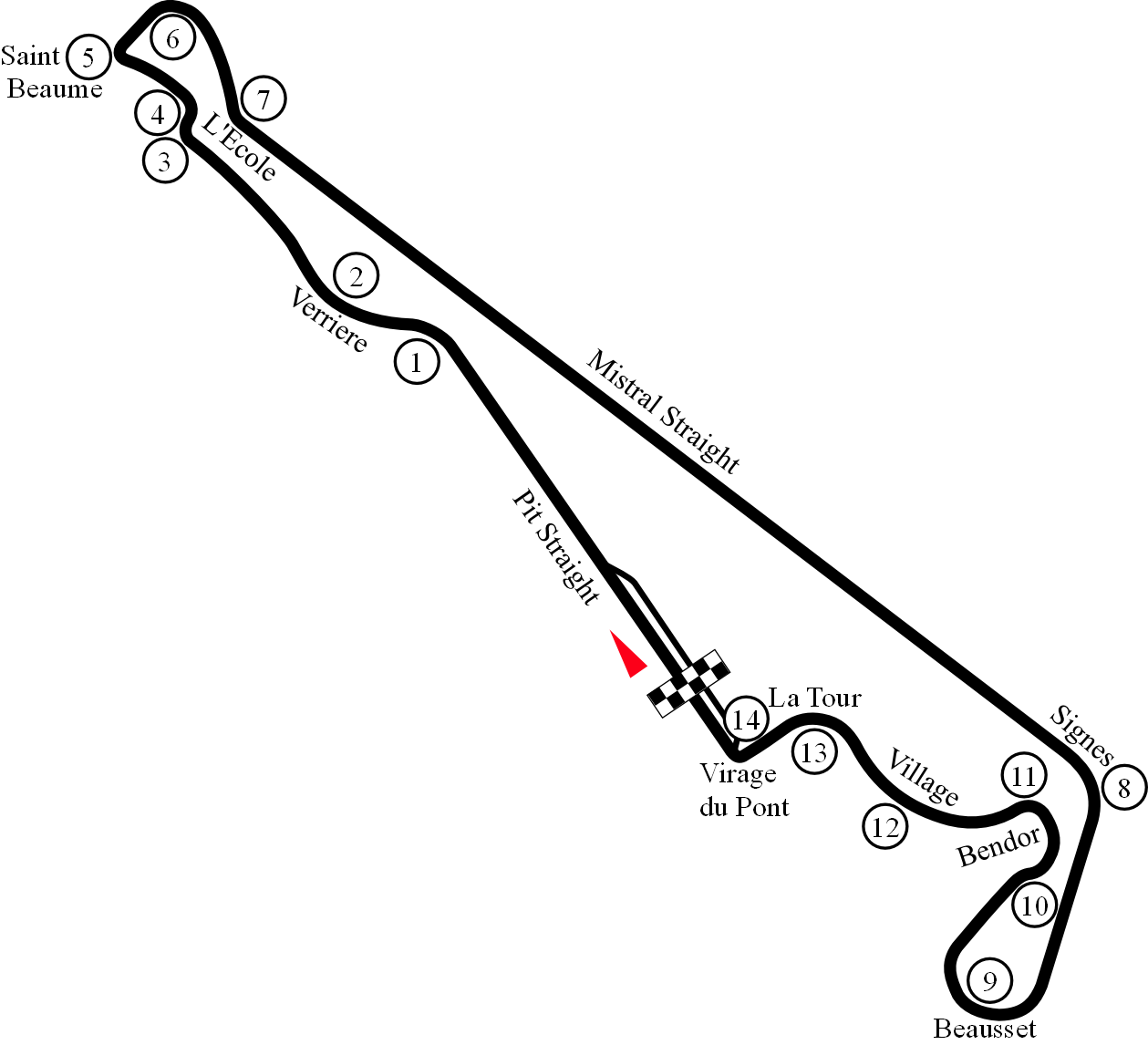
Layout of the Circuit Paul Ricard long circuit (1970-2001)

The 1996 BPR 4 Hours of Le Castellet was the first race of the 1996 BPR Global GT Series. It was run at the Circuit Paul Ricard on 3 March 1996.

== Official results ==
Class winners in bold. Cars failing to complete 75% of winner's distance marked as Not Classified (NC).

Pos	Class	No	Team	Drivers	Chassis	Tyre	Laps
Pos	Class	No	Team	Drivers	Engine	Tyre	Laps
1	**GT1**	**2**	**(United Kingdom) Gulf Racing (United Kingdom) GTC Motorsport**	**(United Kingdom) Ray Bellm (United Kingdom) James Weaver**	**McLaren F1 GTR**	**MI**	**121**
1	**GT1**	**2**	**(United Kingdom) Gulf Racing (United Kingdom) GTC Motorsport**	**(United Kingdom) Ray Bellm (United Kingdom) James Weaver**	**BMW S70 6.1L V12**	**MI**	**121**
2	GT1	27	(Italy) Ennea Igol	(Sweden) Anders Olofsson (Italy) Luciano della Noce	Ferrari F40 GTE	**P**	121
2	GT1	27	(Italy) Ennea Igol	(Sweden) Anders Olofsson (Italy) Luciano della Noce	Ferrari 3.5L Turbo V8	**P**	121
3	GT1	28	(Italy) Ennea Igol	(France) Jean-Marc Gounon (France) Éric Bernard (France) Paul Belmondo	Ferrari F40 GTE	**P**	121
3	GT1	28	(Italy) Ennea Igol	(France) Jean-Marc Gounon (France) Éric Bernard (France) Paul Belmondo	Ferrari 3.5L Turbo V8	**P**	121
4	GT1	11	(Germany) Konrad Motorsport	(Austria) Franz Konrad (France) Bob Wollek	Porsche 911 GT2 Evo	**MI**	119
4	GT1	11	(Germany) Konrad Motorsport	(Austria) Franz Konrad (France) Bob Wollek	Porsche 3.6L Turbo Flat-6	**MI**	119
5	GT1	49	(Germany) Freisinger Motorsport	(Germany) Wolfgang Kaufmann (France) Stéphane Grégoire (Netherlands) Mike Hezemans	Porsche 911 GT2 Evo	**G**	117
5	GT1	49	(Germany) Freisinger Motorsport	(Germany) Wolfgang Kaufmann (France) Stéphane Grégoire (Netherlands) Mike Hezemans	Porsche 3.6L Turbo Flat-6	**G**	117
6	**GT2**	**56**	**(Germany) Roock Racing**	**(Switzerland) Bruno Eichmann (Germany) Ralf Kelleners (Germany) Gerd Ruch**	**Porsche 911 GT2**	**MI**	**116**
6	**GT2**	**56**	**(Germany) Roock Racing**	**(Switzerland) Bruno Eichmann (Germany) Ralf Kelleners (Germany) Gerd Ruch**	**Porsche 3.6L Turbo Flat-6**	**MI**	**116**
7	GT2	60	(Germany) Oberbayern Motorsport	(Germany) Jürgen von Gartzen (Germany) Detlef Hübner	Porsche 911 GT2	**P**	116
7	GT2	60	(Germany) Oberbayern Motorsport	(Germany) Jürgen von Gartzen (Germany) Detlef Hübner	Porsche 3.6L Turbo Flat-6	**P**	116
8	GT2	55	(Switzerland) Stadler Motorsport	(Switzerland) Enzo Calderari (Switzerland) Lilian Bryner	Porsche 911 GT2	**P**	115
8	GT2	55	(Switzerland) Stadler Motorsport	(Switzerland) Enzo Calderari (Switzerland) Lilian Bryner	Porsche 3.6L Turbo Flat-6	**P**	115
9	GT2	96	(France) Larbre Compétition	(France) Patrice Goueslard (France) Stéphane Ortelli (Germany) André Ahrlé	Porsche 911 GT2	**MI**	115
9	GT2	96	(France) Larbre Compétition	(France) Patrice Goueslard (France) Stéphane Ortelli (Germany) André Ahrlé	Porsche 3.6L Turbo Flat-6	**MI**	115
10	GT1	8	(France) BBA Compétition	(France) Jean-Luc Maury-Laribière (Netherlands) Hans Hugenholtz (France) Marc Sourd	McLaren F1 GTR	**D**	115
10	GT1	8	(France) BBA Compétition	(France) Jean-Luc Maury-Laribière (Netherlands) Hans Hugenholtz (France) Marc Sourd	BMW S70 6.1L V12	**D**	115
11	GT2	64	(United Kingdom) Lanzante Motorsport	(United States) Paul Burdell (United Kingdom) Soames Langton (Sweden) Stanley Dickens	Porsche 911 GT2	**MI**	114
11	GT2	64	(United Kingdom) Lanzante Motorsport	(United States) Paul Burdell (United Kingdom) Soames Langton (Sweden) Stanley Dickens	Porsche 3.6L Turbo Flat-6	**MI**	114
12	GT2	75	(United Kingdom) Agusta Racing Team	(Italy) Almo Coppelli (Italy) Sandro Munari (Italy) Marco Spinelli	Callaway Corvette Supernatural	**D**	114
12	GT2	75	(United Kingdom) Agusta Racing Team	(Italy) Almo Coppelli (Italy) Sandro Munari (Italy) Marco Spinelli	Chevrolet LT1 6.2L V8	**D**	114
13	GT2	88	(Germany) Konrad Motorsport	(Brazil) André Lara Resende (Switzerland) Toni Seiler	Porsche 911 GT2	**MI**	113
13	GT2	88	(Germany) Konrad Motorsport	(Brazil) André Lara Resende (Switzerland) Toni Seiler	Porsche 3.6L Turbo Flat-6	**MI**	113
14	GT2	65	(Germany) Roock Racing	(France) François Lafon (France) Lucien Guitteny (France) David Smadja	Porsche 911 GT2	**MI**	113
14	GT2	65	(Germany) Roock Racing	(France) François Lafon (France) Lucien Guitteny (France) David Smadja	Porsche 3.6L Turbo Flat-6	**MI**	113
15	GT1	9	(France) Franck Muller Watches (France) Giroix Racing Team	(France) Fabien Giroix (Switzerland) Jean-Denis Délétraz (France) Didier Cottaz	McLaren F1 GTR	**MI**	113
15	GT1	9	(France) Franck Muller Watches (France) Giroix Racing Team	(France) Fabien Giroix (Switzerland) Jean-Denis Délétraz (France) Didier Cottaz	BMW S70 6.1L V12	**MI**	113
16	GT2	50	(Switzerland) Stadler Motorsport	(Switzerland) Uwe Sick (Switzerland) Charles Margueron	Porsche 911 GT2	**P**	111
16	GT2	50	(Switzerland) Stadler Motorsport	(Switzerland) Uwe Sick (Switzerland) Charles Margueron	Porsche 3.6L Turbo Flat-6	**P**	111
17	GT2	54	(Netherlands) Bert Ploeg	(Netherlands) Bert Ploeg (France) François Birbeau	Porsche 911 GT2	?	111
17	GT2	54	(Netherlands) Bert Ploeg	(Netherlands) Bert Ploeg (France) François Birbeau	Porsche 3.6L Turbo Flat-6	?	111
18	GT2	66	(United Kingdom) EMKA Racing	(United Kingdom) Steve O'Rourke (United Kingdom) Guy Holmes	Porsche 911 GT2	**D**	110
18	GT2	66	(United Kingdom) EMKA Racing	(United Kingdom) Steve O'Rourke (United Kingdom) Guy Holmes	Porsche 3.6L Turbo Flat-6	**D**	110
19	GT2	67	(United Kingdom) Simpson Engineering (Italy) Promosport Italia	(Italy) Raffaele Sangiuolo (Italy) Renato Mastropietro (Italy) Vincenzo Polli	Porsche 911 GT2	**P**	109
19	GT2	67	(United Kingdom) Simpson Engineering (Italy) Promosport Italia	(Italy) Raffaele Sangiuolo (Italy) Renato Mastropietro (Italy) Vincenzo Polli	Porsche 3.6L Turbo Flat-6	**P**	109
20	GT1	12	(France) Chardon des Dunes	(France) Patrick Vuillaume (France) Christian Pellieux (Belgium) Philippe De Craene	Porsche 911 GT2 Evo	?	109
20	GT1	12	(France) Chardon des Dunes	(France) Patrick Vuillaume (France) Christian Pellieux (Belgium) Philippe De Craene	Porsche 3.6L Turbo Flat-6	?	109
21	GT2	74	(Switzerland) Callaway Schweiz	(Switzerland) Kurt Huber (Switzerland) Hans Hauser	Callaway Corvette Supernatural	?	109
21	GT2	74	(Switzerland) Callaway Schweiz	(Switzerland) Kurt Huber (Switzerland) Hans Hauser	Chevrolet LT1 6.2L V8	?	109
22	GT2	70	(France) Jean-François Véroux	(France) Jean-François Véroux (France) Jean-Yves Moine (France) Stéphane Leloup	Porsche 911 GT2	?	109
22	GT2	70	(France) Jean-François Véroux	(France) Jean-François Véroux (France) Jean-Yves Moine (France) Stéphane Leloup	Porsche 3.6L Turbo Flat-6	?	109
23	GT2	77	(Germany) Seikel Motorsport	(Austria) Manfred Jurasz (Italy) Giuseppe Quargentan (France) Pascal Dro	Porsche 911 GT2	**P**	109
23	GT2	77	(Germany) Seikel Motorsport	(Austria) Manfred Jurasz (Italy) Giuseppe Quargentan (France) Pascal Dro	Porsche 3.6L Turbo Flat-6	**P**	109
24	GT2	90	(Italy) Robert Sikkens Racing	(Italy) Angelo Zadra (Italy) Maurizio Monforte	Porsche 911 GT2	**G**	108
24	GT2	90	(Italy) Robert Sikkens Racing	(Italy) Angelo Zadra (Italy) Maurizio Monforte	Porsche 3.6L Turbo Flat-6	**G**	108
25	GT2	63	(Italy) Roger Racing	(Italy) Ruggero Grassi (France) Mario Passerini	Porsche 993 Supercup	?	107
25	GT2	63	(Italy) Roger Racing	(Italy) Ruggero Grassi (France) Mario Passerini	Porsche 3.8L Flat-6	?	107
26	GT2	59	(France) Raymond Touroul	(France) Didier Ortion (France) Raymond Touroul	Porsche 911 GT2	?	105
26	GT2	59	(France) Raymond Touroul	(France) Didier Ortion (France) Raymond Touroul	Porsche 3.6L Turbo Flat-6	?	105
27	GT2	62	(Italy) Leanston Racing	(Italy) Luca Cattaneo (Italy) Alberto Mondinelli	Porsche 964 Carrera RS	?	101
27	GT2	62	(Italy) Leanston Racing	(Italy) Luca Cattaneo (Italy) Alberto Mondinelli	Porsche 3.6L Flat-6	?	101
28	GT2	73	(United Kingdom) Morgan Motor Company	(United Kingdom) Charles Morgan (United Kingdom) Bill Wykeham	Morgan Plus 8 GTR	**D**	99
28	GT2	73	(United Kingdom) Morgan Motor Company	(United Kingdom) Charles Morgan (United Kingdom) Bill Wykeham	Rover 5.0L V8	**D**	99
29	GT2	99	(Switzerland) Elf Haberthur Racing	(France) Ferdinand de Lesseps (France) Philippe Charriol (France) Richard Balandras	Porsche 911 GT2	**P**	98
29	GT2	99	(Switzerland) Elf Haberthur Racing	(France) Ferdinand de Lesseps (France) Philippe Charriol (France) Richard Balandras	Porsche 3.6L Turbo Flat-6	**P**	98
30	GT2	30	(France) Quattro Pilotage	(France) Thierry Guiod (France) Patrick Pelissier (France) Guy Martinolle	Porsche 911 Bi-Turbo	?	97
30	GT2	30	(France) Quattro Pilotage	(France) Thierry Guiod (France) Patrick Pelissier (France) Guy Martinolle	Porsche 3.6L Turbo Flat-6	?	97
31 DNF	GT1	5	(France) Eric Graham	(France) Eric Graham (France) Michel Faraut (France) David Velay	Venturi 600 LM	**D**	89
31 DNF	GT1	5	(France) Eric Graham	(France) Eric Graham (France) Michel Faraut (France) David Velay	Renault PRV 3.0L Turbo V6	**D**	89
32 DNF	GT1	20	(France) Venturi Team Lécuyer	(France) Christophe Bouchut (France) Laurent Lécuyer (Switzerland) Philippe Favre	Venturi 600 SLM	**MI**	88
32 DNF	GT1	20	(France) Venturi Team Lécuyer	(France) Christophe Bouchut (France) Laurent Lécuyer (Switzerland) Philippe Favre	Renault PRV 3.0L Turbo V6	**MI**	88
33 DNF	GT2	57	(Germany) Freisinger Motorsport	(France) Michel Quiniou (France) Richard Flammang (France) Michel Ligonnet	Porsche 911 GT2	**G**	85
33 DNF	GT2	57	(Germany) Freisinger Motorsport	(France) Michel Quiniou (France) Richard Flammang (France) Michel Ligonnet	Porsche 3.6L Turbo Flat-6	**G**	85
34 DNF	GT2	53	(Switzerland) Yellow Racing	(France) Christian Heinkelé (Switzerland) Jean Gay (Sweden) Tony Ring	Ferrari F355 GT	**MI**	78
34 DNF	GT2	53	(Switzerland) Yellow Racing	(France) Christian Heinkelé (Switzerland) Jean Gay (Sweden) Tony Ring	Ferrari F131 3.5L V8	**MI**	78
35 DNF	GT1	21	(United Kingdom) Lotus Racing Team	(Netherlands) Jan Lammers (United Kingdom) Alexander Portman	Lotus Esprit V8 Turbo	**MI**	72
35 DNF	GT1	21	(United Kingdom) Lotus Racing Team	(Netherlands) Jan Lammers (United Kingdom) Alexander Portman	Lotus 3.5L Turbo V8	**MI**	72
36 DNF	GT2	76	(United Kingdom) Agusta Racing Team	(Italy) Riccardo Agusta (France) Patrick Camus (Italy) Marco Spinelli	Callaway Corvette Supernatural	**D**	71
36 DNF	GT2	76	(United Kingdom) Agusta Racing Team	(Italy) Riccardo Agusta (France) Patrick Camus (Italy) Marco Spinelli	Chevrolet LT1 6.2L V8	**D**	71
37 DNF	GT2	52	(Germany) Krauss Rennsporttechnik	(Germany) Bernhard Müller (Germany) Michael Trunk	Porsche 911 GT2	**P**	66
37 DNF	GT2	52	(Germany) Krauss Rennsporttechnik	(Germany) Bernhard Müller (Germany) Michael Trunk	Porsche 3.6L Turbo Flat-6	**P**	66
38 DNF	GT2	98	(France) Michel Cottot	(France) Michel Cottot (France) Philippe Smaniotto (France) Jean-Claude Barthe	Venturi 400 GTR	?	64
38 DNF	GT2	98	(France) Michel Cottot	(France) Michel Cottot (France) Philippe Smaniotto (France) Jean-Claude Barthe	Renault PRV 3.0L Turbo V6	?	64
39 DNF	GT1	48	(Germany) Freisinger Motorsport	(France) Guy Broissiat (France) Michel Mora (France) Jean-Pierre Castel	911 Bi-Turbo	**G**	47
39 DNF	GT1	48	(Germany) Freisinger Motorsport	(France) Guy Broissiat (France) Michel Mora (France) Jean-Pierre Castel	Porsche 3.8L Turbo Flat-6	**G**	47
40 DNF	GT1	7	(United Kingdom) G-Force Racing	(United Kingdom) John Greasley (United Kingdom) John Morrison	Porsche 911 GT2 Evo	**P**	45
40 DNF	GT1	7	(United Kingdom) G-Force Racing	(United Kingdom) John Greasley (United Kingdom) John Morrison	Porsche 3.6L Turbo Flat-6	**P**	45
41 DNF	GT1	1	(United Kingdom) West Competition (United Kingdom) David Price Racing	(Denmark) John Nielsen (Germany) Thomas Bscher	McLaren F1 GTR	**G**	41
41 DNF	GT1	1	(United Kingdom) West Competition (United Kingdom) David Price Racing	(Denmark) John Nielsen (Germany) Thomas Bscher	BMW S70 6.1L V12	**G**	41
42 DNF	GT1	6	(United Kingdom) Gulf Racing (United Kingdom) GTC Competition	(United Kingdom) Lindsay Owen-Jones (France) Pierre-Henri Raphanel	McLaren F1 GTR	**MI**	31
42 DNF	GT1	6	(United Kingdom) Gulf Racing (United Kingdom) GTC Competition	(United Kingdom) Lindsay Owen-Jones (France) Pierre-Henri Raphanel	BMW S70 6.1L V12	**MI**	31
43 DNF	GT1	3	(United Kingdom) Harrods Mach One Racing (United Kingdom) David Price Racing	(United Kingdom) Andy Wallace (France) Olivier Grouillard	McLaren F1 GTR	**G**	24
43 DNF	GT1	3	(United Kingdom) Harrods Mach One Racing (United Kingdom) David Price Racing	(United Kingdom) Andy Wallace (France) Olivier Grouillard	BMW S70 6.1L V12	**G**	24
44 DNF	GT1	4	(Germany) Roock Racing	(France) Jean-Pierre Jarier (Germany) Altfrid Heger	Porsche 911 GT2 Evo	**MI**	24
44 DNF	GT1	4	(Germany) Roock Racing	(France) Jean-Pierre Jarier (Germany) Altfrid Heger	Porsche 3.6L Turbo Flat-6	**MI**	24
45 DNF	GT1	40	(France) Pilot Pen Racing	(France) Michel Ferté (France) Olivier Thévenin	Ferrari F40 LM	**MI**	15
45 DNF	GT1	40	(France) Pilot Pen Racing	(France) Michel Ferté (France) Olivier Thévenin	Ferrari 3.0L Turbo V8	**MI**	15
46 DNF	GT2	97	(France) Larbre Compétition	(France) Jean-Luc Chéreau (France) Jack Leconte (France) Pierre Yver	Porsche 911 GT2	**MI**	13
46 DNF	GT2	97	(France) Larbre Compétition	(France) Jean-Luc Chéreau (France) Jack Leconte (France) Pierre Yver	Porsche 3.6L Turbo Flat-6	**MI**	13
47 DNF	GT2	72	(France) Legeay Sports	(France) Benjamin Roy (France) Patrick Legeay	Alpine A610	?	11
47 DNF	GT2	72	(France) Legeay Sports	(France) Benjamin Roy (France) Patrick Legeay	Renault PRV 3.0L Turbo V6	?	11
48 DNF	GT2	83	(Netherlands) Marcos Racing International	(Netherlands) Cor Euser (Brazil) Thomas Erdos (France) Gérard Bacle	Marcos LM600	**D**	9
48 DNF	GT2	83	(Netherlands) Marcos Racing International	(Netherlands) Cor Euser (Brazil) Thomas Erdos (France) Gérard Bacle	Chevrolet 6.0L V8	**D**	9
DNS	GT1	43	(France) JCB Racing (France) Raymond Touroul	(France) Jean-Claude Basso (France) Henri Pescarolo	Venturi 600 SLM	**D**	-
DNS	GT1	43	(France) JCB Racing (France) Raymond Touroul	(France) Jean-Claude Basso (France) Henri Pescarolo	Renault PRV 3.0L Turbo V6	**D**	-
DNS	GT2	51	(Germany) Proton Competition	(Germany) Peter Erl (Germany) Gerold Ried	Porsche 911 GT2	**P**	-
DNS	GT2	51	(Germany) Proton Competition	(Germany) Peter Erl (Germany) Gerold Ried	Porsche 3.6L Turbo Flat-6	**P**	-
DNS	GT2	68	(France) VBM	(France) Jean-François Metz (France) Patrick Bornhauser	VBM 4000 GTC	?	-
DNS	GT2	68	(France) VBM	(France) Jean-François Metz (France) Patrick Bornhauser	Renault PRV 3.0L Turbo V6	?	-

== Statistics ==
- Pole Position - (France) Jean-Marc Gounon (#28 Ennea Igol) - 1:51.512
- Fastest Lap - (Sweden) Anders Olofsson (#27 Ennea Igol) - 1:52.653

BPR Global GT Series
Previous race: None	1996 season	Next race: 1996 BPR 4 Hours of Monza
