= Porsche 911 (964) =

Porsche 964
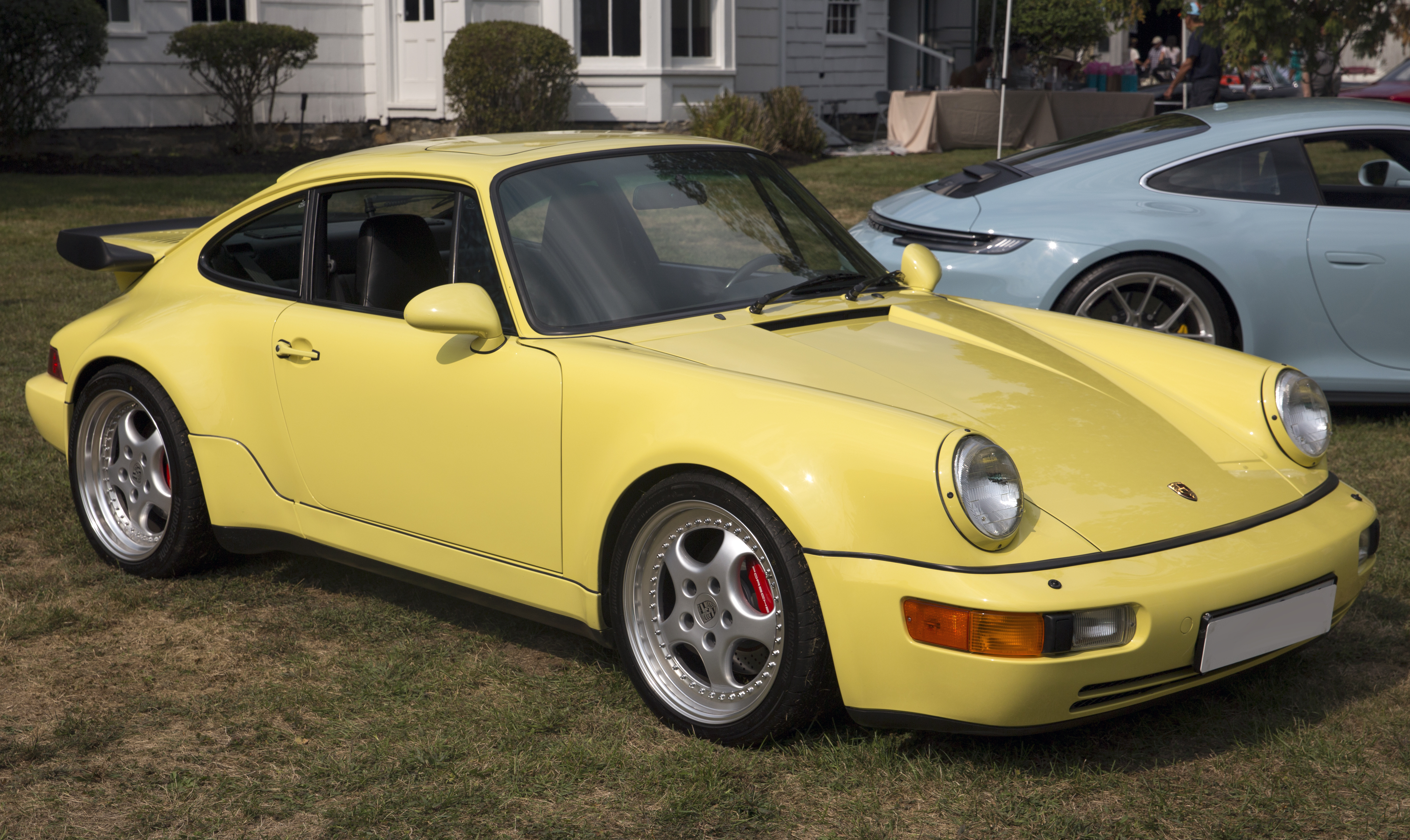
- Porsche 911 Turbo 3.3 (964)

Overview
- Manufacturer: Porsche
- Also called: Porsche 911; Porsche Carrera
- Production: 1989–December 1993; 63,762 built
- Assembly: Germany: Baden-Württemberg, Stuttgart
- Designer: Benjamin Dimson (1985, 1986)

Body and chassis
- Class: Sports car
- Body style: 2-door coupé 2-door convertible 2-door targa
- Layout: RR layout R4 layout
- Related: Ruf RCT

Powertrain
- Engine: 3.3 L M30/69 turbo F6; 3.6 L M64/01, 02, 03 F6; 3.6 L M64/50 turbo F6; 3.75 L M64/04 F6 (3.8 RS/RSR)
- Transmission: 5-speed Getrag G50 manual 4-speed Tiptronic automatic 5-speed 4WD Getrag G64 manual

Dimensions
- Wheelbase: 2,270 mm (89.4 in)
- Length: 4,275 mm (168.3 in)
- Width: 1,650–1,775 mm (65.0–69.9 in)
- Height: 1,310–1,320 mm (51.6–52.0 in)

Chronology
- Predecessor: Porsche 911 (classic), Porsche 911 (930)
- Successor: Porsche 993

The Porsche 964 is a model of the Porsche 911 sports car manufactured and sold between 1989 and 1994. Designed by Benjamin Dimson through January 1986, it featured significant styling revisions over previous 911 models, most prominently the more integrated bumpers. It was the first car to be offered with Porsche's Tiptronic automatic transmission and all-wheel drive as options.

== Name ==
Type 964 ("nine-sixty-four", or "nine-six-four") is Porsche's internal code name for the 911 Carrera 2 and 911 Carrera 4 models, which were badged simply as "Carrera 2" and "Carrera 4". "964" is used by automotive publications and enthusiasts to distinguish them from other generations of the Carrera.

== Carrera 2 and 4 ==
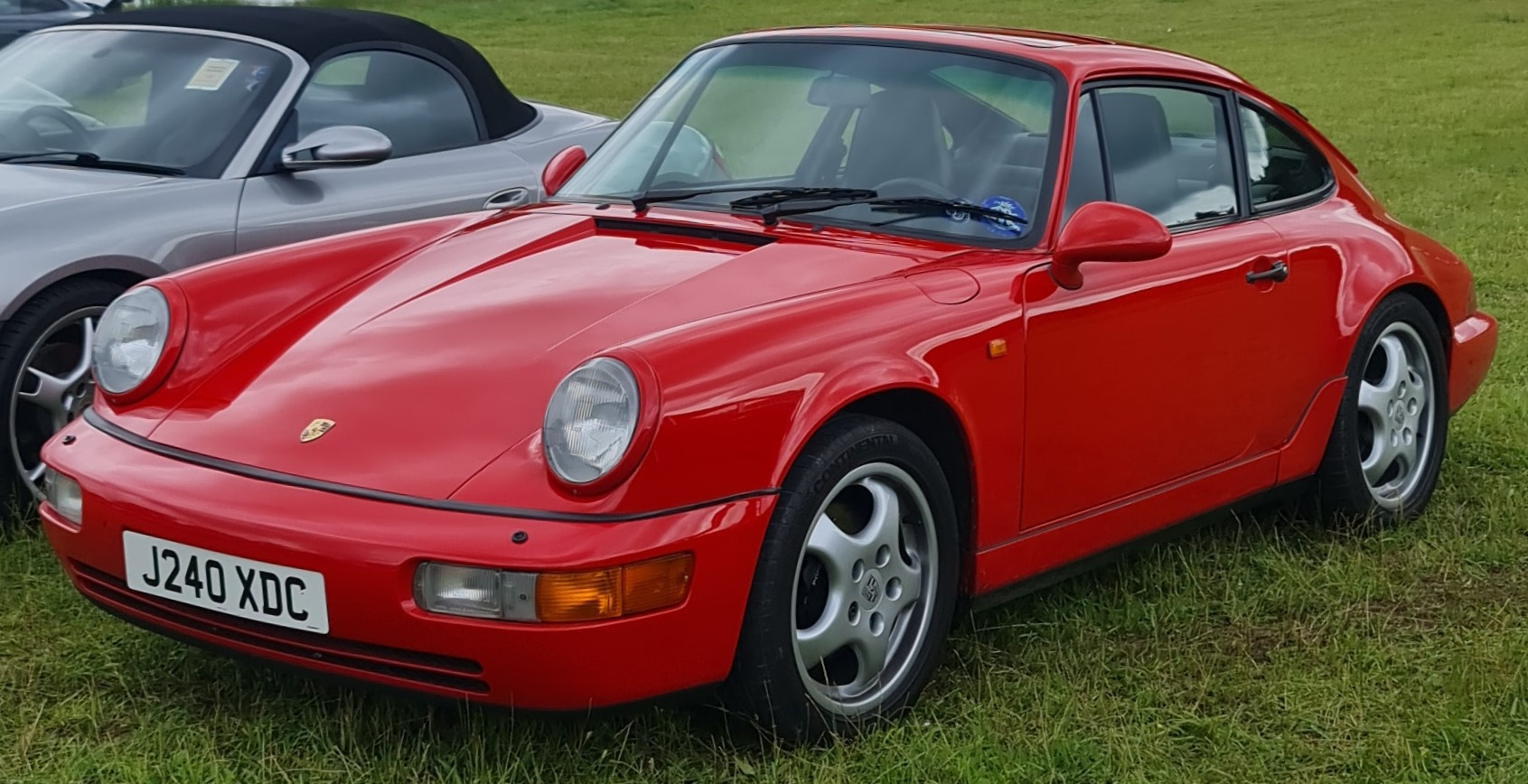
Porsche 964 Carrera

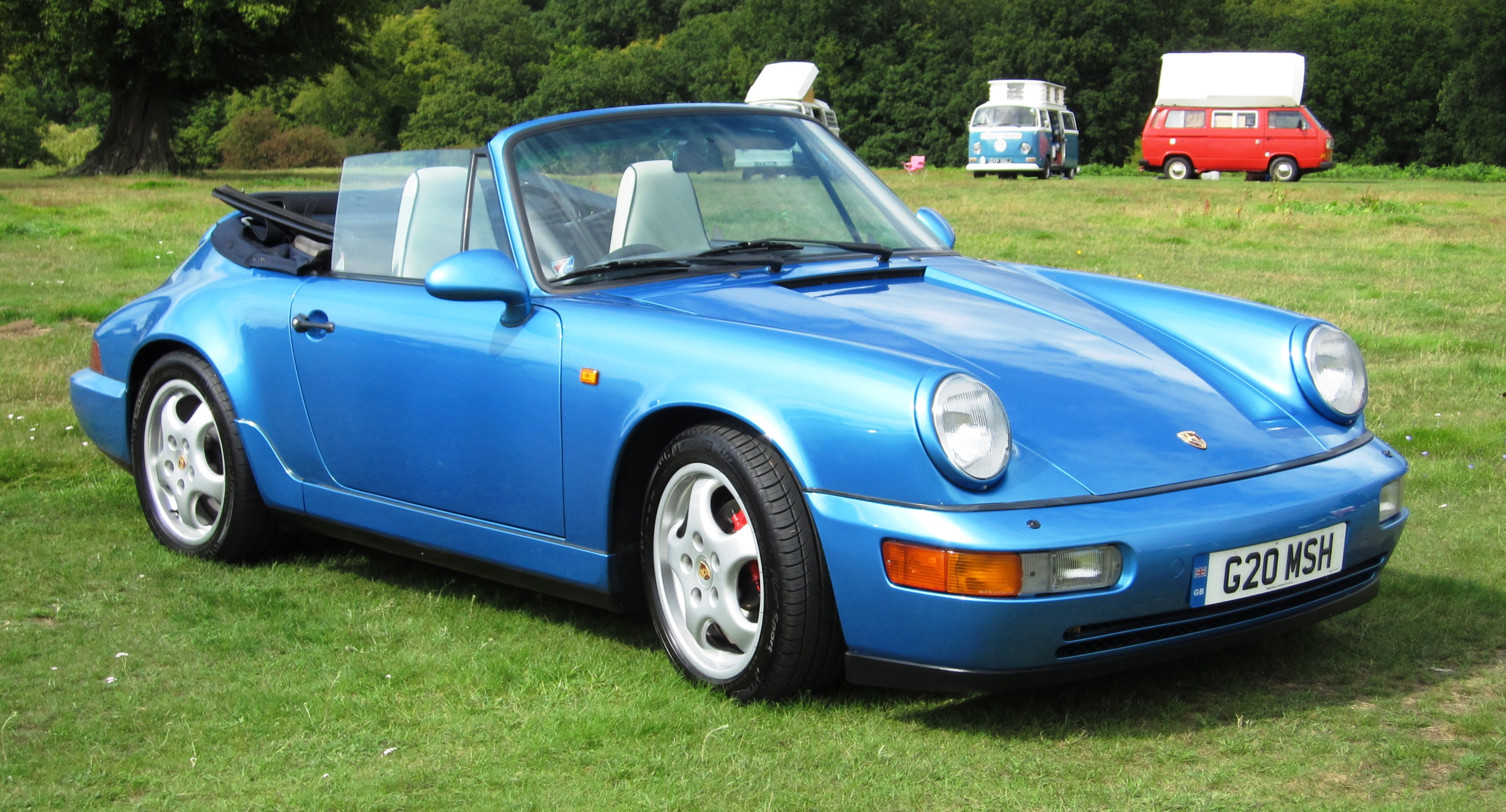
Porsche 964 Carrera 4 cabriolet

The 964 was considered to be 85% new as compared to its predecessor, the Carrera 3.2. The first 964s available in 1989 were all wheel drive equipped "Carrera 4" models; Porsche added the rear-wheel drive Carrera 2 variant to the range in 1990. Both variants were available as a coupé, targa or cabriolet. The 964 Carrera was the last generation sold with the traditional removable Targa roof until the 2011 991 (993, 996, and 997 versions used instead a complex glass-roof "greenhouse" system). The exterior bumpers and fog lamps became flush with the car for better aerodynamics. A new electric rear spoiler raised at speeds above 80 km/h (50 mph) and lowered down flush with the rear engine lid at lower speeds.

A new naturally aspirated engine called the M64 was used for 964 models, with a flat-6 displacement of 3.6 litres. Porsche substantially revised the suspension, replacing torsion bars with coil springs and shock absorbers. Power steering and ABS brakes were added to the 911 for the first time; both were standard.

A revised interior featured standard dual airbags beginning in late 1989 for all North American production 1990 MY cars. A new automatic climate control system provided improved heating and cooling. Revised instrumentation housed a large set of warning lights that were tied into the car's central warning system, alerting the driver to a possible problem or malfunction.

=== Engine ===
Engine design: Air/oil-cooled, horizontally-opposed, dry-sump lubricated, rear-mounted
Engine displacement: 3,600 cc (220 cu in)
Cylinders: Six
Bore and stroke: 100 × 76.4 mm (3.94 × 3.01 in)
Compression ratio: 11.3 : 1
Fuel/ignition: Electronic fuel injection, DME controller, with twin-spark with knock regulation
Crankshaft: Forged, seven main bearings
Block and heads: aluminum alloy
Valve Train: Single Overhead cam (SOHC) – one per bank, double chain drive
Power: 250 PS (184 kW; 247 hp) at 6,100 rpm
Torque: 310 N⋅m (229 lb⋅ft) at 4,800 rpm
Engine speed limitation: 6,700 rpm

=== Chassis ===
The suspension was redesigned using coil springs instead of torsion bars, the first major engineering changes since the original 911. The front suspension used MacPherson struts, a system that has continued for all subsequent versions, but the rear suspension retained semi-trailing arms.

=== Performance ===
Top speed: 260 km/h (162 mph), 256 km/h (159 mph) (Tiptronic)
0–60 mph: 5.5 s (manual transmission), 6.2 s (Tiptronic)
1/4 mile: 13.6 s (C2), 14.0 s (Tiptronic), 14.1 s (C4)
Coefficient of drag: 0.32
Fuel consumption approx 24 mpg

=== Selected dimensions/capacities ===
Curb weight (to DIN 70020): 3,031 lb/1,375 kg (C2); 3,100 lb/1,406 kg (Tiptronic), 3,252 lb (1,475 kg) (C4)
Wheelbase: 89.4 in (2,270 mm)
Overall Length: 168.3 in (4,270 mm)
Width 65.0 in (1,650 mm)
Height: 52.0 in (1,320 mm)
Front Track: 54.3 in (1,380 mm)
Rear Track: 54.1 in (1,370 mm)
Ground Clearance: 4.7 in (US)
Fuel Tank: 20.3 gal (US)
Engine Oil: 11.5 L (12.1 qt US), oil change volume: 9 L (9.5 qt US)
Transmission Fluid: 3.6 L (3.8 qt US) (C2), 9 L (9.5 qt US (Tiptronic), 3.8 L (4.0 qt US) (C4)

== Carrera RS variants ==
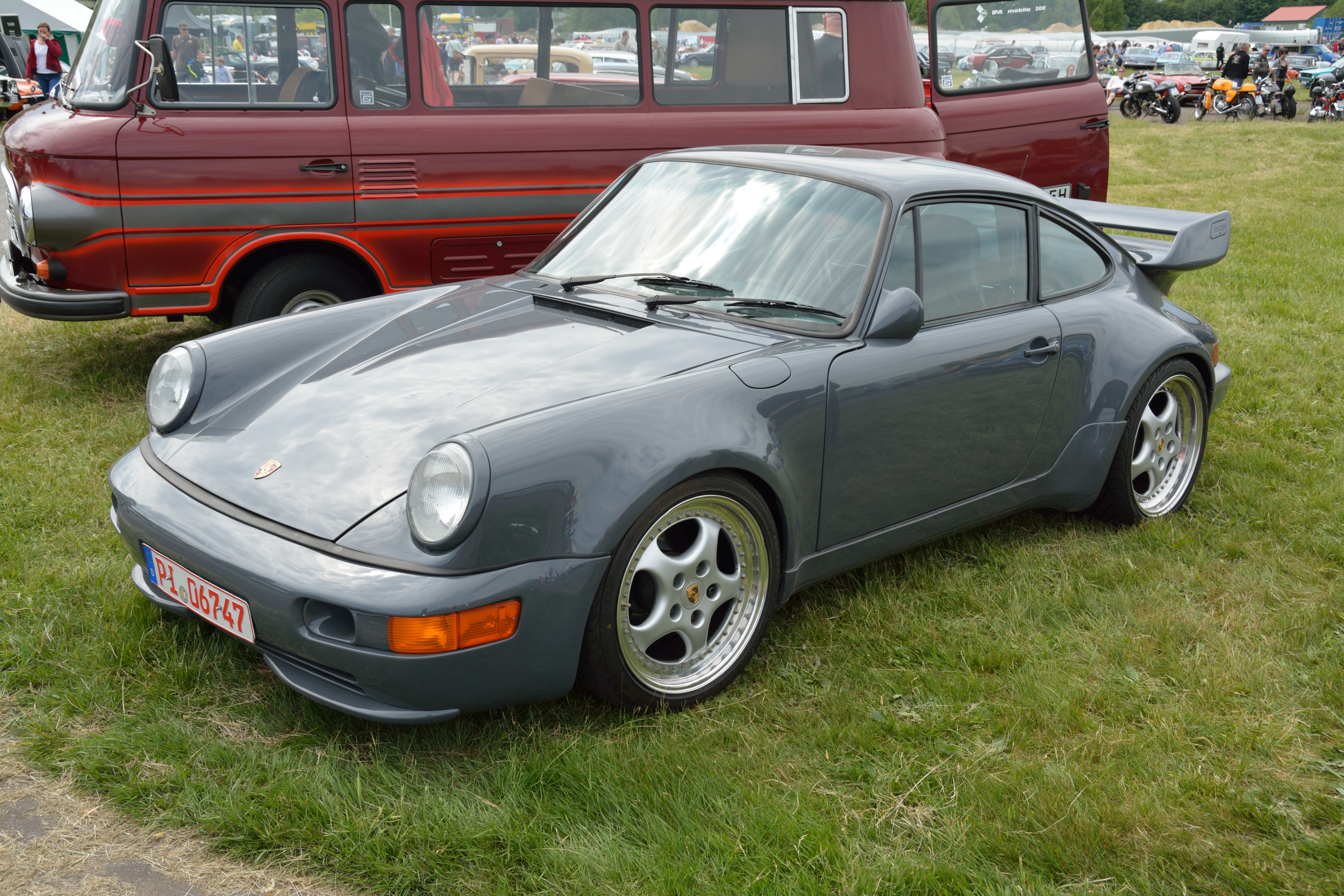
Porsche 964 Carrera 3.8 RS

In 1992, Porsche produced a super-lightweight, rear-wheel-drive only version of the 964 dubbed Carrera RS for the European market. It was based on Porsche's 911 "Carrera Cup" race car and harked back to the 2.7 and 3.0 RS and RSR models. It featured a revised version of the standard engine, titled M64/03 internally, with a marginally increased power output of 260 PS (191 kW; 256 bhp) and a lightweight flywheel coupled to the G50/10 transmission with closer ratios, asymmetrical limited-slip differential, and steel synchromesh. A track-oriented suspension system with 40 mm (1.6 in) lower ride height, stiffer springs, shocks and adjustable stabilizer bars without power steering (RHD UK cars did have power steering).

Two versions were available; the standard RS and Clubsport.

The standard RS or heavier "Touring" variant included more creature comforts when compared with the Clubsport (thin carpets, some sound deadening, leather lined bucket seats, undercarriage protection with options such as a radio, power windows, and air conditioning).

The Clubsport package (option code M003) included a fully stripped-out interior devoid of power windows, seats, rear seats, air conditioning, cruise control, stereo system, sound deadening and carpeting. It was equipped with a roll cage and full racing-bucket front seats. The bonnet was aluminum and the chassis was seam welded. Wheels were magnesium and the glass was thinner in the doors and rear window. At 1,217 kg (2,683 lb), the Carrera RS is approximately 123 kg (271 lb) lighter than the US-market RS America. Porsche made 290 cars with the M003 option code.

Towards the end of the production run a limited production version was available in Europe; called the Carrera 3.8 RS. It featured the wider Turbo body and a 300 PS (221 kW; 296 bhp) 3.8-litre version of the M64 motor. This engine was bored out by 2 mm for a total of 3,746 cc, and was also available in a more powerful competition version called the 3.8 RSR. Only 11 3.8 spec cars were equipped with the Clubsport package.

Carrera RS engine

Engine Design: Air-cooled or oil-cooled, horizontally opposed (flat), dry-sump lubrication, rear-mounted engine
Displacement: 3,600 cc (220 cu in)
Cylinders: Six
Bore and Stroke: 3.94 × 3.01 in (100.0 × 76.4 mm)
Compression ratio: 11.3 : 1
Fuel/Ignition: Electronic fuel injection, DME controller, twin-spark with knock regulation
Crankshaft: Forged, 8 main bearings
Block and heads: aluminum alloy
Valve Train: Overhead cam, one per bank, double chain drive
Power: 260 PS DIN (191 kW; 256 bhp) at 6,100 rpm
Torque: 312 N⋅m DIN (230 lb⋅ft) at 4,800 rpm

=== RS America ===
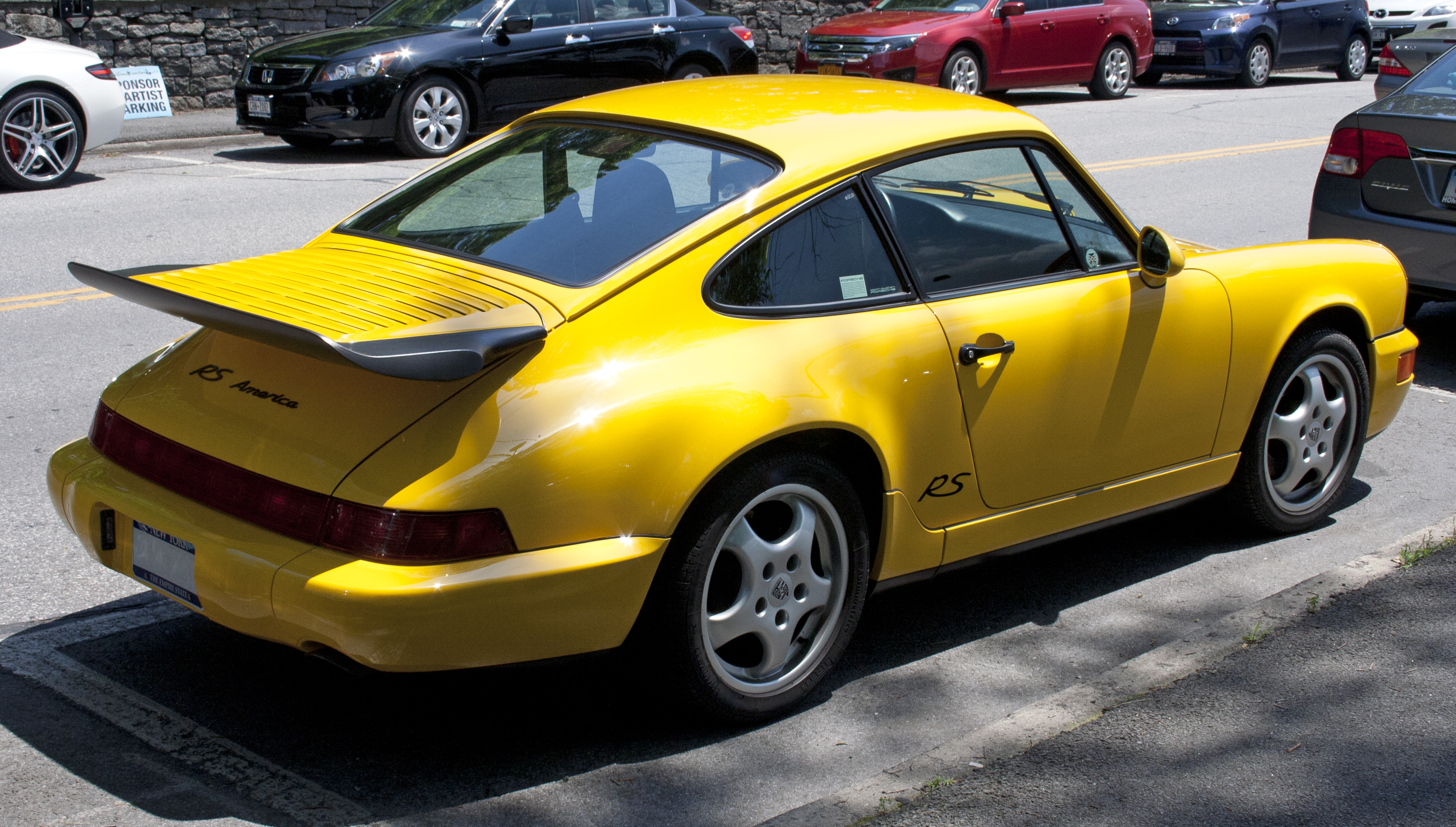
Porsche RS America in Ferrari Yellow (1 of 4 painted in this color)

The Carrera RS was not sold in the United States because Porsche Cars North America realized the challenges of the RS complying with U.S. federal crash and emission laws. In 1992, 45 US-legal cars that were very similar to the Carrera RS were imported to the US for a proposed "Porsche Carrera Cup" racing series. This Carrera Cup series was to function as a support race for the American CART racing series just as European Carrera Cup has supported Formula One.

These 45 cars were identical to a Carrera RS other than having airbags (with required electric windows), alarm system, American lighting, American bumpers, aluminum wheels, and standard seats. The cars otherwise had the lightweight seam welded chassis, lightweight interior trim, aluminum hood, lightweight door glass, suspension, brakes, G50/10 transmission and M64/03 engine etc. of the Carrera RS. These cars were approximately 200 pounds (90 kg) lighter than a normal US Carrera 2 model.

The plan was for Andial, the then equivalent of what is now Porsche Motorsport US, to convert these cars to full racing specification, however, due to lack of sponsor support, the Carrera Cup series was cancelled before it began. The 45 cars imported to the US for this series were then sold, quietly without any advertising so as not to compete with the new RS America, through normal dealer channels. These cars were supplied with a dash plaque which indicated that they were the "Carrera Cup US Edition".

In order to please devoted American 911 enthusiasts who wanted an RS model, Porsche produced the less uncompromising RS America. The RS America was produced as a model year 1993 and 1994 car based on the US Carrera 2. A total of 701 were produced. The cars were offered in standard colors red, black and white and optional colors midnight blue metallic and polar silver. A total of four color to sample cars were manufactured in Ferrari Yellow. The first was custom manufactured for the New York Auto Show, the other three were custom "color to sample". There was also a very small number of other color to sample cars, but the $2498 cost to order was high for 1993. The RS America featured a distinctive "whale tail" spoiler, a partially stripped interior with flat door panels, with fabric door pulls, (from the European RS) and carpeting along with a luggage shelf with storage underneath (1993 model only) replacing the rear seats. Cloth covered sports seats, 17 inch wheels and M030 Sports Suspension were fitted as standard. Lightweight fabric trunk mats were included. The logo "RS America" was placed on the rear deck lid along with an "RS" logo in front of the rear wheels. Deleted to save weight were power steering, cruise control, powered side mirrors, air conditioning, sunroof and radio, although the air conditioning, sunroof and radio as well as a limited-slip differential could be ordered as options. The RS America was listed by Porsche as weighing 2,954 lb (1,340 kg), 77 lb (35 kg) lighter than the weight listed for a stock Carrera 2. The standard US Carrera 2 engine and gearbox were used. These vehicles became popular among racing enthusiasts and were often purpose used in racetrack and auto cross events.

== 964 Cup ==
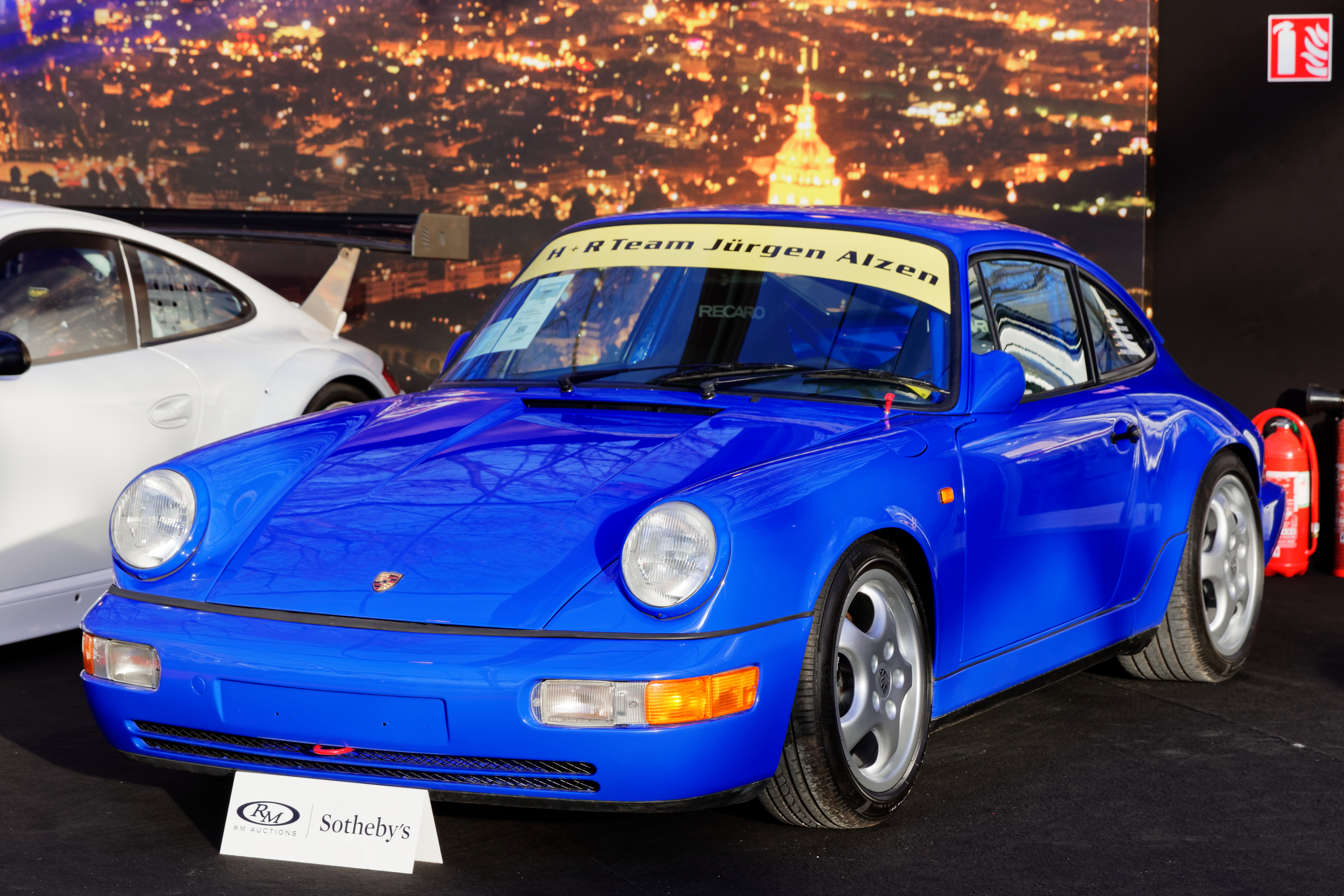
964 Cup

Based on the Porsche 964 was the 1990 racing version for the new Porsche Carrera Cup. In addition to an increase in output by 11 kW to 265 PS (195 kW; 261 hp), the 964 Cup had a welded roll cage, a modified chassis set-up and the ground clearance was 55 mm (2.2 in) lower than on the standard version. To reduce weight much of the interior comforts including the sound-proofing material was removed. The gear ratios were modified and it had non power-steering. The vehicle did have a catalytic converter and an anti-lock braking system (ABS).

In 1992, the 964 Cup had a major revision. The vehicle now had the body from the 964RS and the engine now produced 275 PS (202 kW; 271 hp). Another major change was that the ABS could be switched off in the event of emergency braking or whilst the car was going backwards. The vehicle now had 18-inch magnesium rims, which replaced the aluminium rims. The car was lowered by a further 20 mm.

=== Technical data ===
Model	Porsche 964 Cup	
Year	1990–1991	1992–1993
Engine	3,600 cc, six-cylinder, boxer engine	
Power	265 PS (195 kW; 261 hp) at 6100 rpm	275 PS (202 kW; 271 hp) at 6100 rpm
Torque	310 N⋅m (229 lb⋅ft) at 4800 rpm	314 N⋅m (232 lb⋅ft) at 4800 rpm
Weight	1,120 kg (2,469 lb)	

== Turbo ==
=== Turbo 3.3 ===
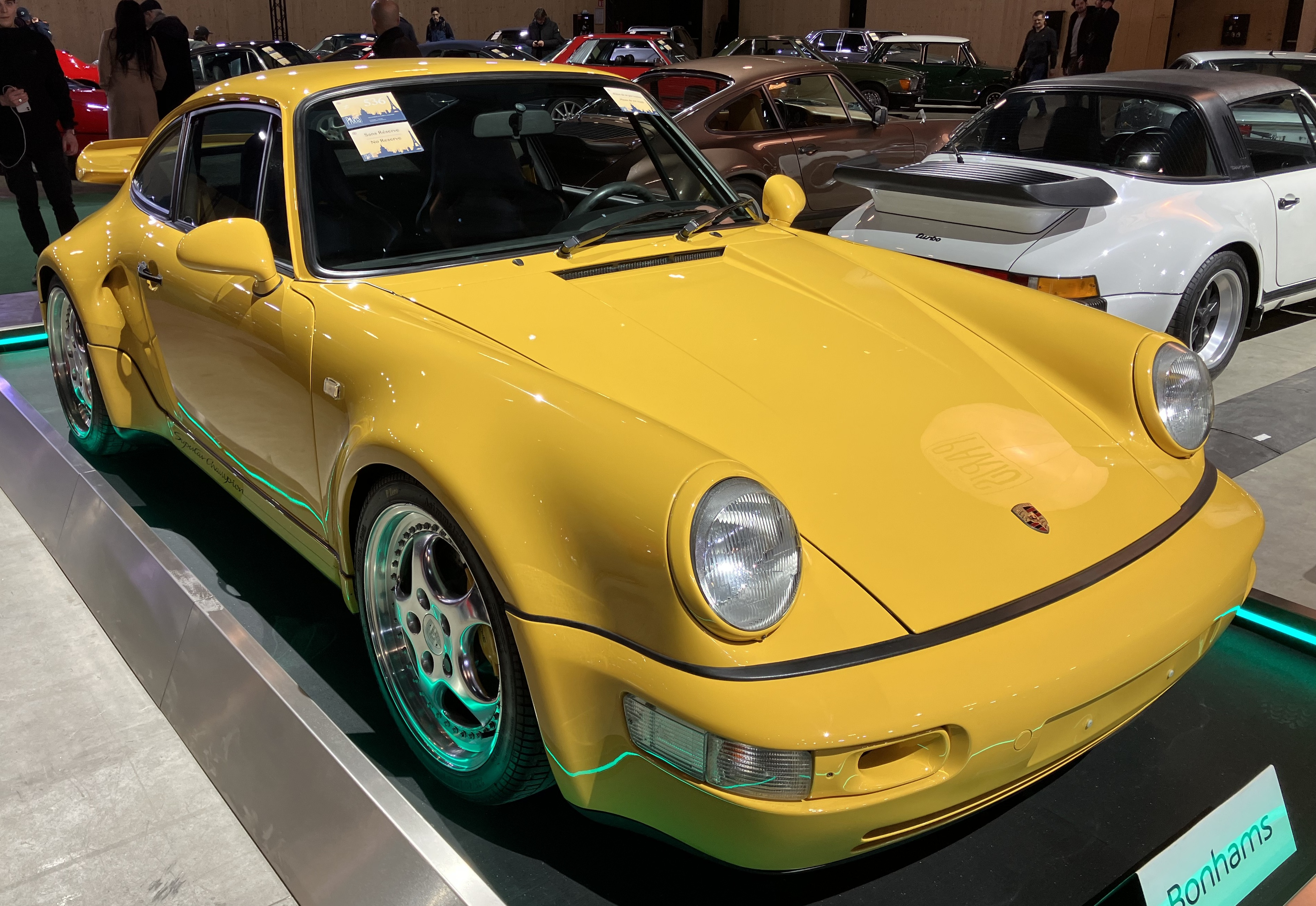

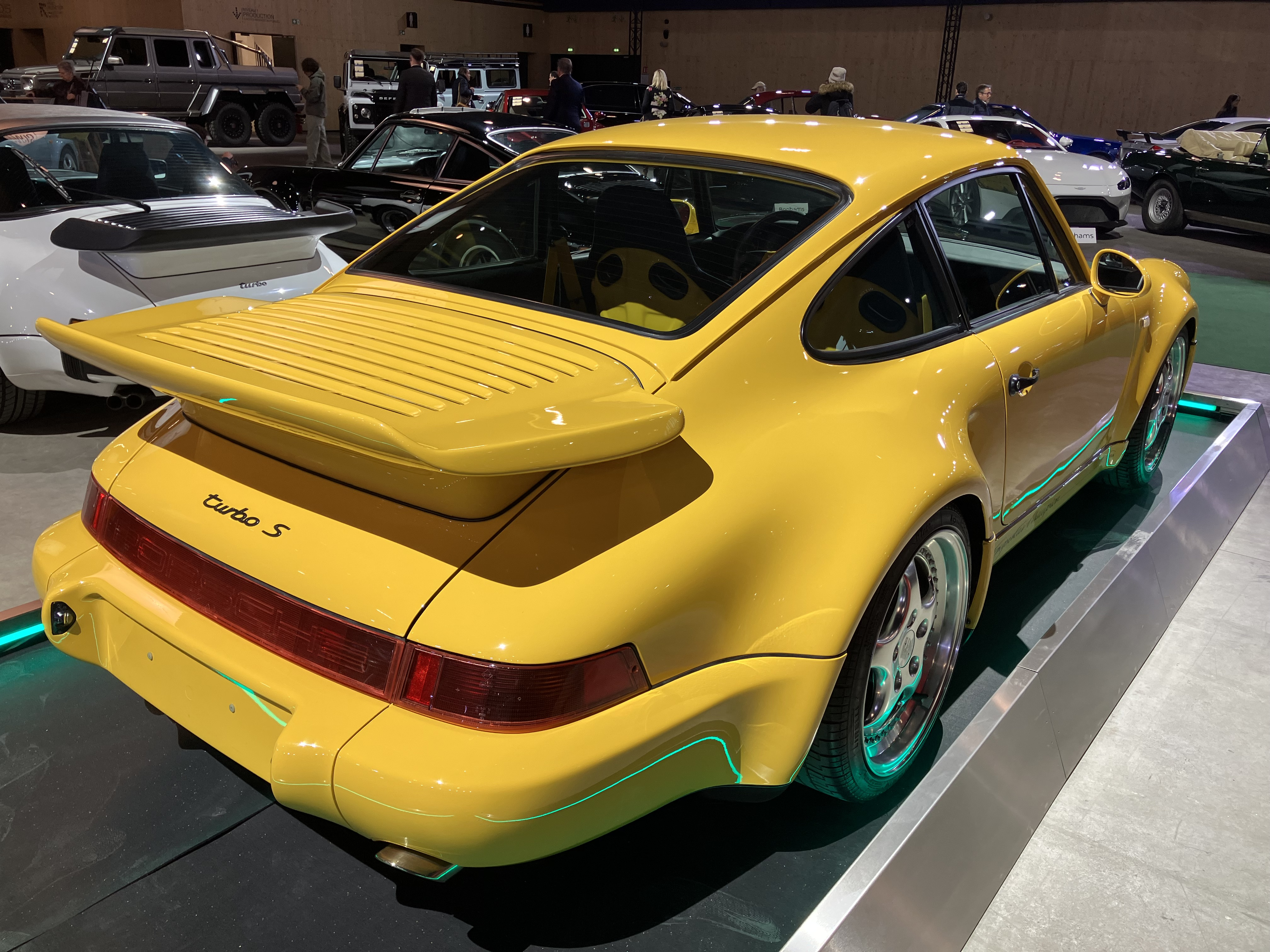
1993 Porsche 964 Turbo S "Leichtbau"

Porsche introduced the 964 Turbo model in March, 1990 as the successor to the 930. However, they did not have the time necessary to develop a turbocharged version of the 3.6-litre M64 engine, and chose to re-use the 3.3-litre engine from the 930, with several minor revisions that made the engine smoother, less prone to turbo lag and more powerful, with a total output of 320 PS (235 kW; 316 hp) at 5,750 rpm. A total of 3,660 964 Turbos were built.

In 1992, the 3.3-litre Turbo S Leichtbau (light build) was introduced. Some 25–50 units were planned, though this was later increased to 80. The standard Turbo model was modified to produce 381 PS (280 kW; 376 hp) with bigger injectors, more boost, more aggressive camshafts, and a lightweight interior with limited "creature comforts", making the Turbo S one of the fastest cars on the road. With suspensions lowered by 40 mm, a front strut brace and manual steering, the Turbo S was geared towards performance. The Leichtbau requirement was achieved by deleting the under-body protection, soundproofing, air conditioning, power steering and rear seats, while further savings came from thinner glass, aluminium doors, a carbon-fibre luggage compartment and thinner carpets, the result being a reduction of 180 kg over the standard Turbo. Production of the Turbo S Leichtbau began in July 1992 for the 1993 model year. Some sources state that Porsche ended up building six more cars than the 80 planned.

=== Turbo 3.6 ===
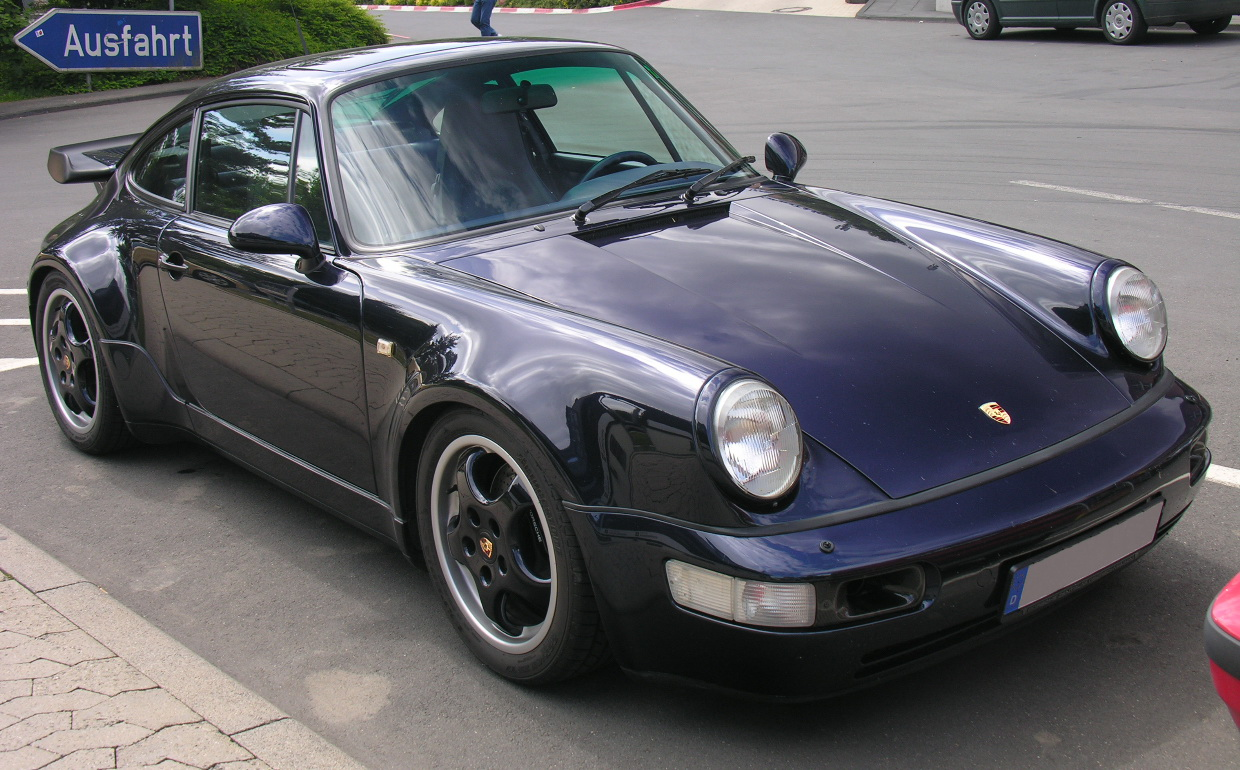
Porsche 964 Turbo

Porsche released the 964 Turbo 3.6 in January 1993, now featuring a KK&K K27 turbocharged version of the 3.6-litre M64 engine developing 360 PS (355 bhp; 265 kW) at 5,500 rpm and 520 N⋅m (384 lb⋅ft) at 4,200 rpm of torque, produced only for model year 1993/1994, with fewer than 1,500 of them produced in total, making it one of the rarest and most sought after Porsches produced since the 959. A black 1994 MY was used in the Bad Boys movie, starring Will Smith.

At the end of 964 production in 1994, the Porsche factory had some 90 Turbo chassis left. These were all transferred to Porsche Exclusiv and built as the very special Turbo 3.6 S, available either with the traditional 964 Turbo 3.6 body or with the exclusive flachbau 'slant nose' option.

Option X83 (Japan), X84 (non-US) and X85 (US), the Turbo S Flachbau, was available in the US as a US$60,179 option on top of the base price US$99,000 Turbo 3.6. The flachbau option was available when ordering the no charge '36S' option '1994 Turbo "S" Model' at a price of $60,179. In addition to the slantnose fenders, it also included the 'X88' option which included the 'Turbo S' motor, the 'X92' Exclusive front spoiler, 'X93' Exclusive rear spoiler and 'X99' Exclusive rear fender air intakes based on the Porsche 959. The flachbau option was designed around the model 968 front end, and the 930 style Turbo S front end for Japan (right down to the sill covers on the fenders). 39 Models were made for US markets, 27 for international market and 10 for Japan, all in Polar Silver (http://flachbau.com). An additional 17 X85 models were commissioned by Porsche Exclusiv for the US, known as the "Package cars," replacing the slantnose front end with the original 964-style front end.

=== Specifications ===
Data/Variant	3.3	3.3 S	3.6	3.6 S
Bore and stroke	97 mm × 74.4 mm (3.82 in × 2.93 in)		100 mm × 76.4 mm (3.94 in × 3.01 in)	
Displacement	3,299 cc (201.3 cu in)		3,600 cc (219.7 cu in)	
Compression ratio	7.0:1		7.5:1	
Power output	320 PS (235 kW; 316 hp) at 5,750 rpm	381 PS (280 kW; 376 hp) at 5,750 rpm	360 PS (265 kW; 355 hp) at 5,500 rpm	385 PS (283 kW; 380 hp) at 5,750 rpm
Torque	450 N⋅m (332 lb⋅ft) at 4,500 rpm	508 N⋅m (375 lb⋅ft) at 5,000 rpm / 490 N⋅m (361 lb⋅ft) at 4,800 rpm	520 N⋅m (384 lb⋅ft) at 4,200 rpm	520 N⋅m (384 lb⋅ft) at 5,000 rpm ZF Clutch type limited slip 20% lock under acceleration 100% lock under deceleration

== 30th Anniversary C4 ==
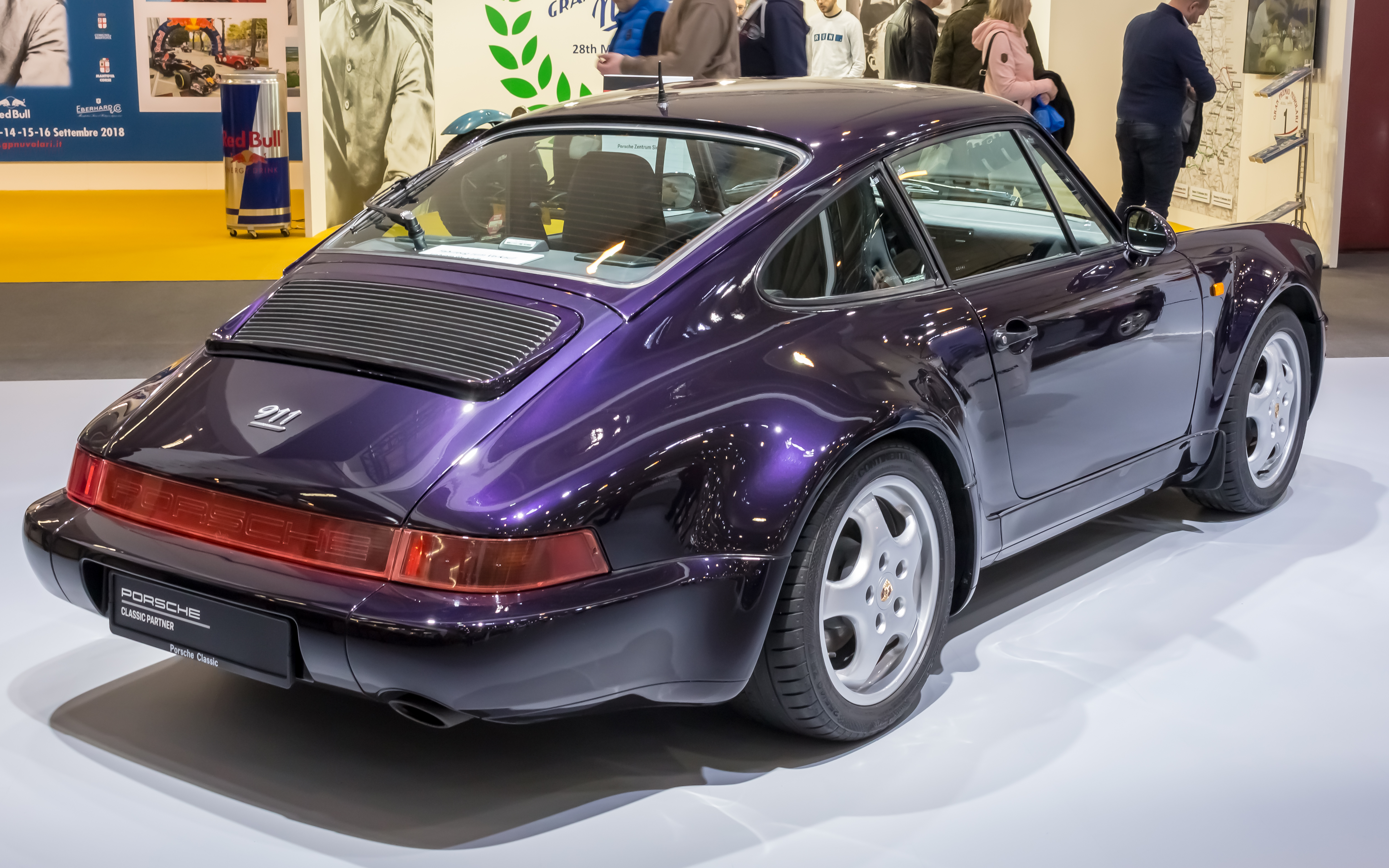
30th anniversary model

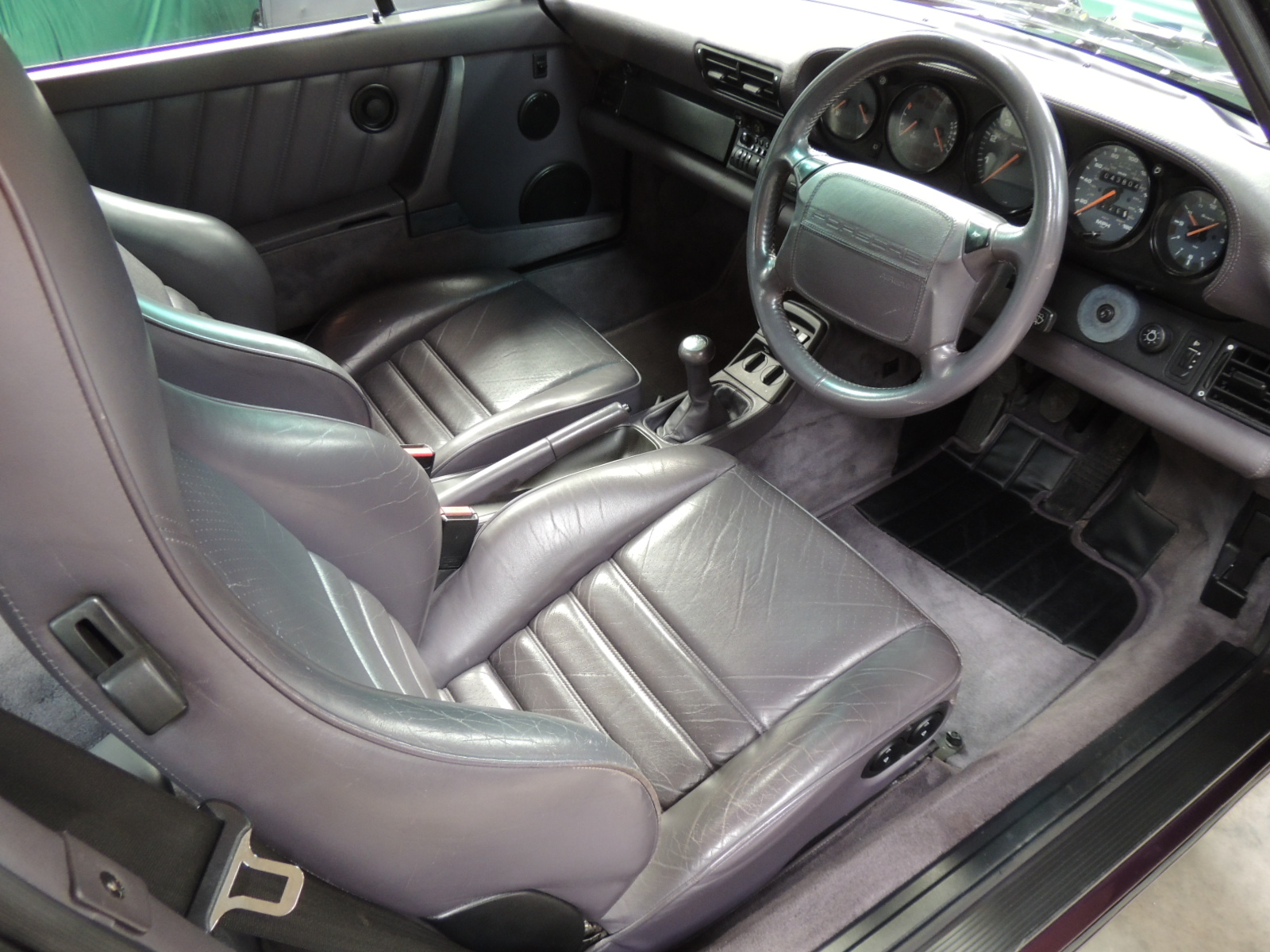
30th anniversary interior

In 1993 Porsche introduced the 30th Anniversary C4 to commemorate 30 years since the 911 launch in 1963. Its based on the wider turbo body and wheels with 4 wheel drive, but with a normally aspirated engine and standard small lifting wing. 911 units were produced, and the car was only offered in Viola, Polar Silver or Amethyst. This version was the start of a line that continued with the 993 C4S and 996 C4S.

== Turbo S LM-GT ==
Also in 1993 Porsche developed a highly tuned 964 Turbo S prototype for use in international motorsport. This car, known as the Turbo S Le Mans GT (or simply Turbo S LM-GT), was based on the standard road-legal Turbo S, but stripped down and modified for circuit use. A deep chin spoiler was added to the front, while two air inlets were added just above the rear wheel arches. An adjustable racing rear wing was added on top of the standard Turbo's wing. Wider wheel arches were used to house 12-inch (300 mm) wide racing slicks. The interior was completely stripped, a rollcage added, and the windows replaced with plastic. The engine used was not the standard road-car unit, but a smaller twin-turbocharged 3.2-litre unit which produced 475 hp.

The Turbo S LM-GT made its debut at the 1993 12 Hours of Sebring where the car finished seventh overall and first in its class with the Brumos Porsche racing team (Röhrl–Stuck–Haywood). From there, the car was entered in the 24 Hours of Le Mans, running under the guise of the Porsche factory team. The car would however fail to finish after the engine was damaged early in the race. For 1994, the Turbo S LM-GT would be moved to the hands of Larbre Compétition, where a new 3.6-litre engine based on the 993 unit would be used in place of the 3.2-litre engine. The team opened the year with a second-place finish at the 24 Hours of Daytona, before moving on to select rounds of the BPR Global GT Series. The car would win all four races in which it competed, including the 1000 km Suzuka. The Turbo S LM-GT would be sold at the end of the year to a Monaco resident where it is located since then.

The development work from the Turbo S LM-GT helped Porsche in creating the 993-generation 911 GT2 in 1995, which would be mass-produced and sold to racing customers. Some teams, unable to buy new 911 GT2s, developed their own twin-turbo racing versions of the 964 Turbo to mimic the Turbo S LM-GT, but lacked the success of the factory project.

== 964 Speedster ==
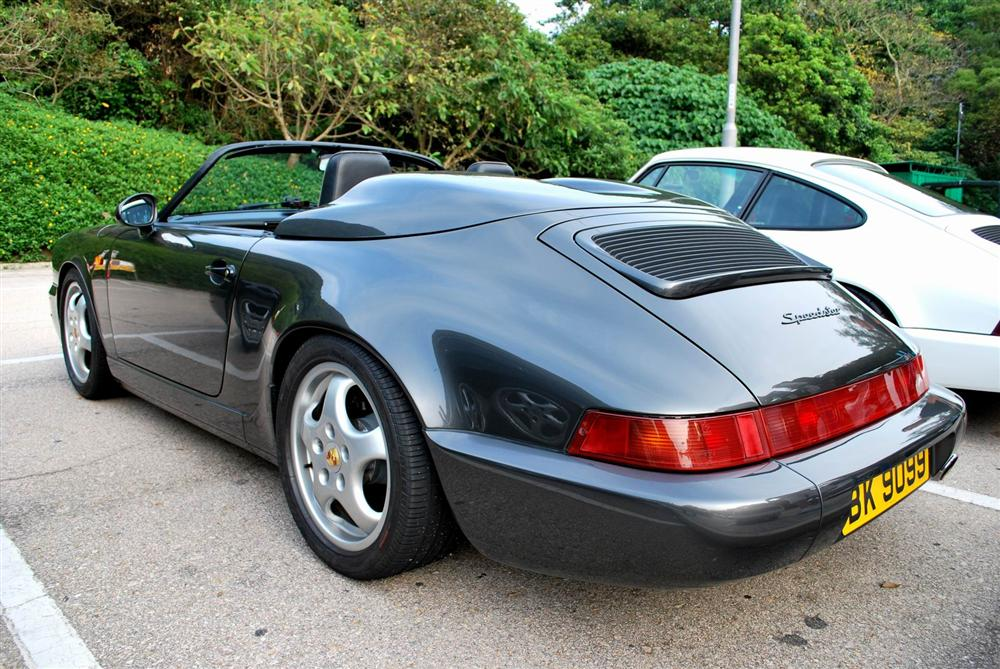
Porsche 964 Speedster

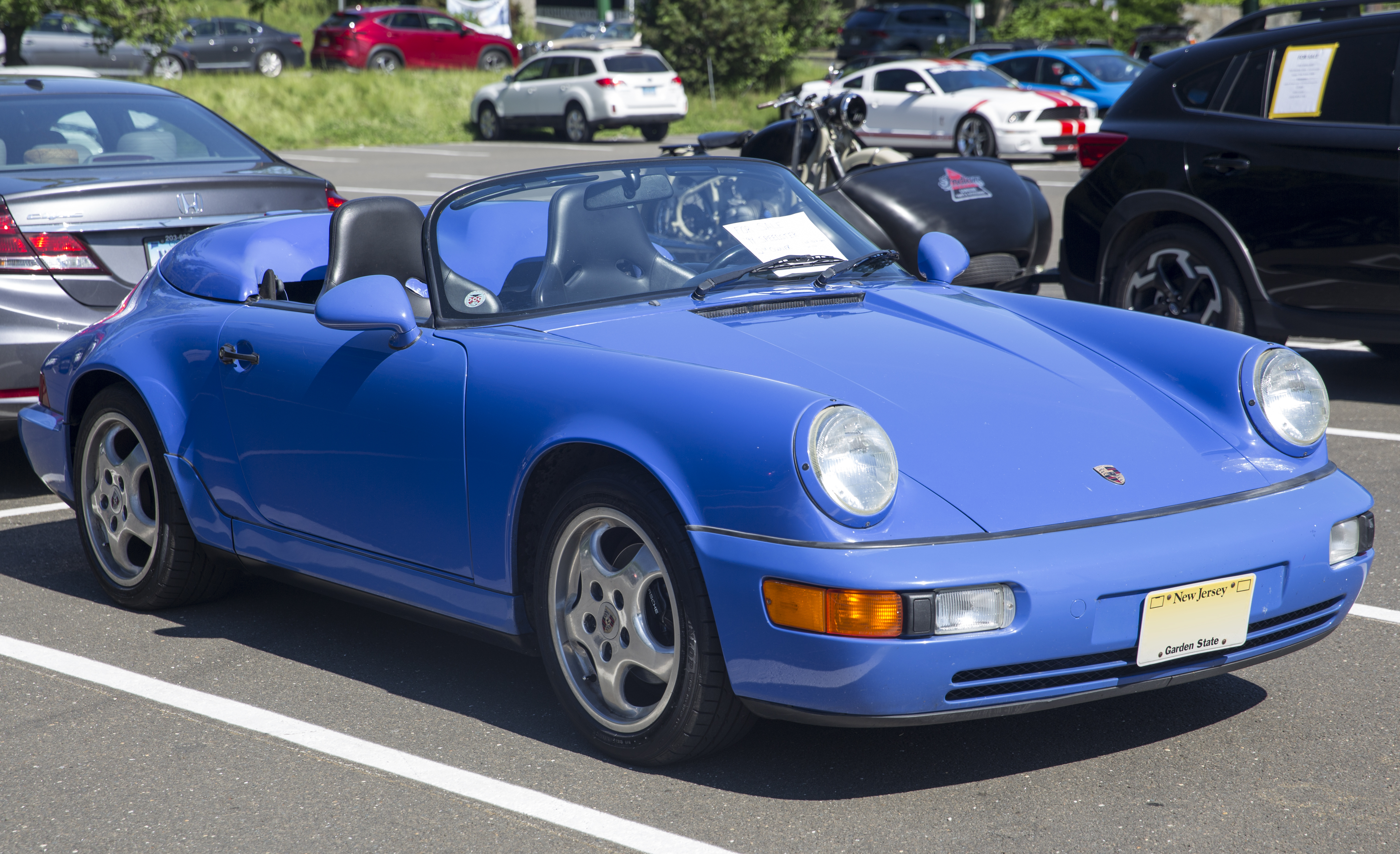
Porsche 964 Speedster

There were two distinct incarnations of the air-cooled 911 Speedster. The first was the 1989 model year Speedster. Shown at the 1988 Frankfurt Motor Show beside the upcoming Carrera 4, the 1989 Speedster actually shared more in common with the 930 turbo than with the upcoming 964 generation 911s, causing it to be looked upon, in retrospect, as a much inferior "driver's car" to the later 1994 Speedster. More than three quarters (641) of the 800 built had the "Turbo look" wide-body option.

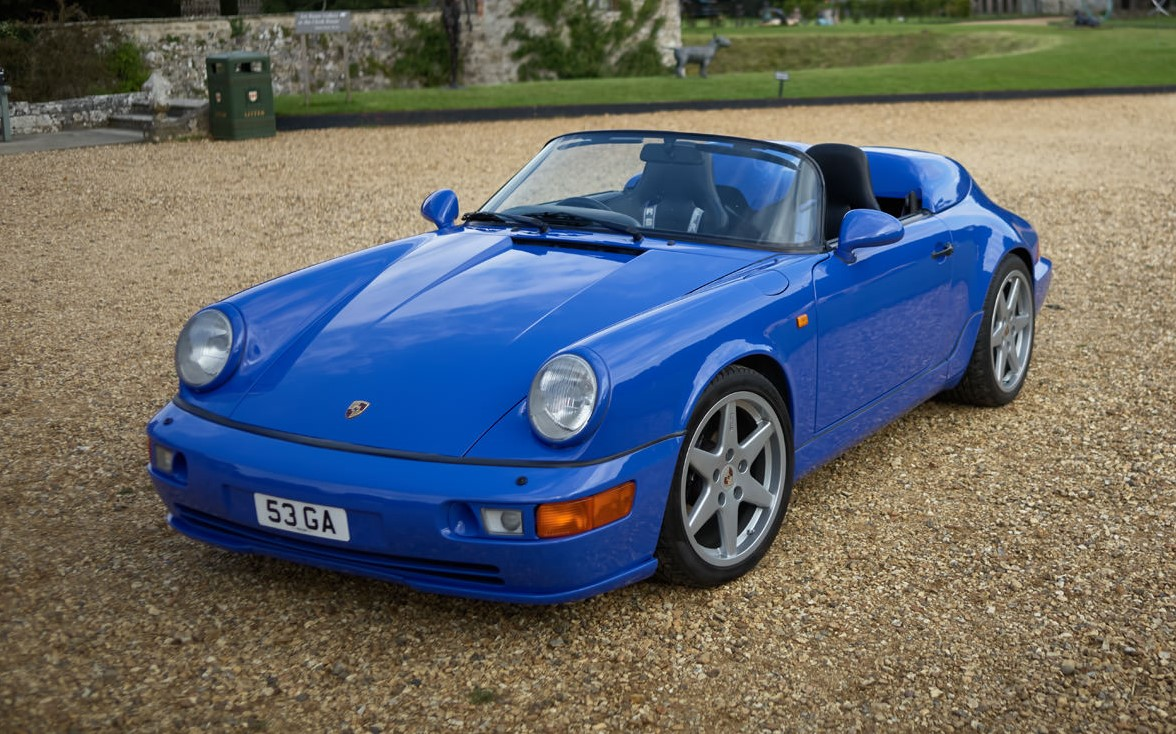
Last RHD 964 Speedster made

The 1994 Porsche 911 Speedster was available either in standard or lightweight trim called "clubsport." Unlike the 1989 model, the 1994 Speedster was based on the new Carrera 2 platform and was not initially available with the "Turbo look" wide-body style. The 1994 Speedster was designed to be a more focused "driver's car" and served as a hybrid between a 964 Carrera 2 Cabriolet and a 964 RS. While it featured a softer suspension set up than the 964 RS, it offered almost none of the comforts of a normal 964 Carrera 2 Cabriolet, though power windows were standard and it was available with air conditioning and a stereo. Porsche planned to build 3000 examples of the 1994 Speedsters in 1992, but only 936 examples were built and sold during the two years of production. Once again, the United States was the most important market with 427 Speedsters heading Stateside. Right-hand drive versions were exceptionally rare this time: only 27 cars compared to 139 examples in right-hand drive of the pre-964 911 Speedster. Of these RHD cars 13 were made with UK specification, 8 Australia specification, 4 Singapore specification and either 2 or 3 Hong Kong specification. Of these RHD there were 6 Speed Yellow, 7 Guards Red, 3 Grey, 4 Black, 1 Slate grey, 1 Amazon Green (the only 964 Speedster in this color), 1 Metallic Silver, 1 Grand Prix White and one Maritime Blue. In addition, 20 special examples were finished at Porsche Exclusive's workshop at Werk 1 (Factory 1) with the optional "Turbo look" wide-bodies.

== America Roadster ==
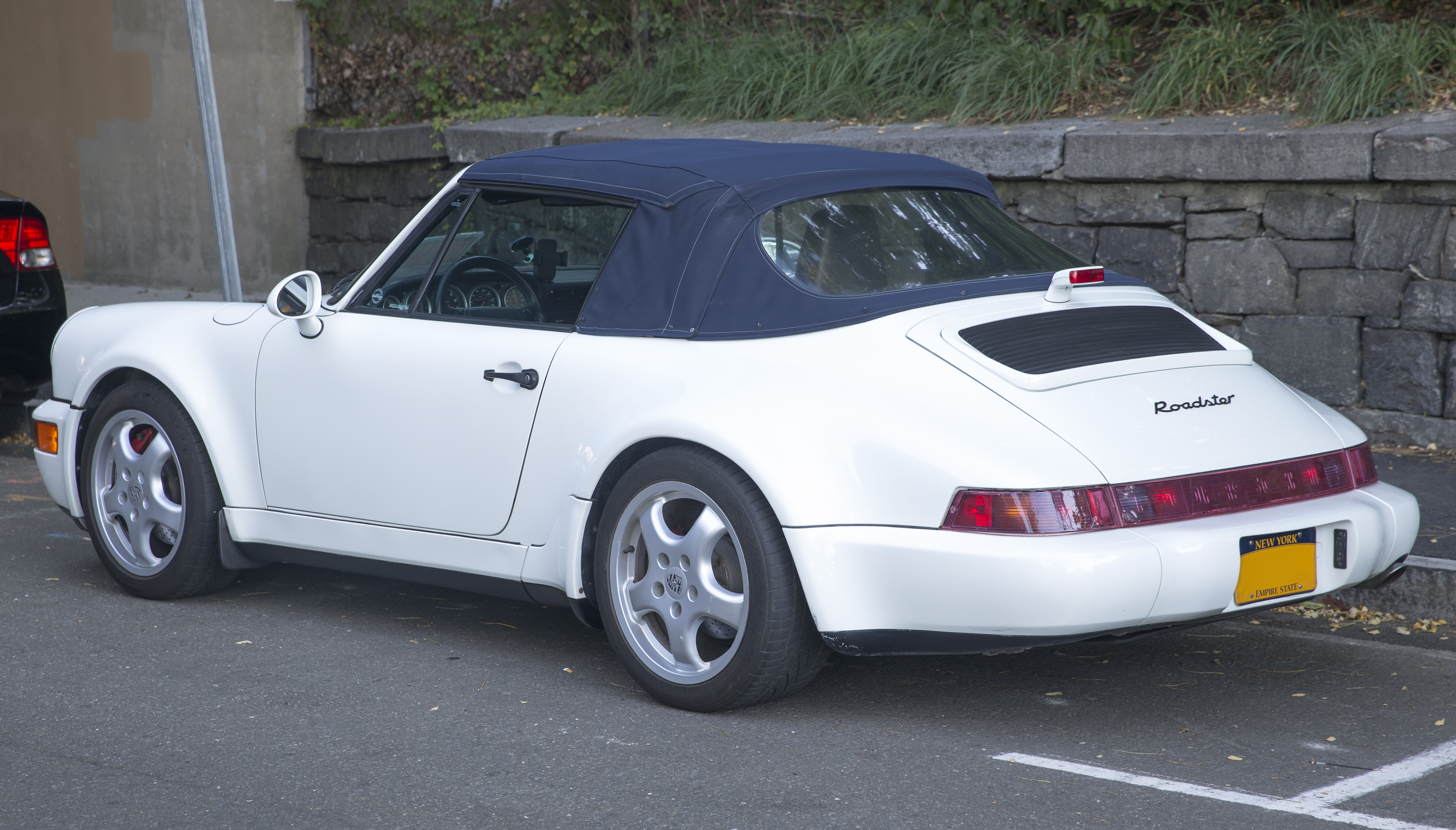
911 (964) America Roadster, with "Turbo look" rear fenders

A turbo-bodied cabriolet version was released in 1992. This had the standard electric spoiler and turbo guards. Mechanically, it was the same as the standard model, apart from 17-inch Cup wheels and the brakes and suspension, which were to Turbo specifications. Only 250 of this variant were produced in total, for the 1992 and 1993 model years.

== Porsche 969 ==
The Porsche 969 was a concept intended to succeed the Porsche 959 and was based on the then upcoming 964 platform.

The car was conceived in 1982 as a twin-turbo 911 with four-wheel drive and a PDK gearbox. The project received the in-house code 965 and was developed along with the new, 964 generation of the 911. However, the intended engine (a 3.3-litre, 374 hp (379 PS; 279 kW) flat-six) could not be used due to cooling problems. Various alternatives were considered during the car's development, including a water-cooled version of the traditional flat-six and two variants of Porsche's Indy V8 engine.

While the 969 shared the 911's roofline, its slanted headlights and wide tail were carryovers from the 959.

Ultimately, the project was scrapped. Ongoing engine development issues and a projected price of over 200,000 DM in the wake of a recession kept it from succeeding the 911 turbo (the 964 turbo made its debut in March 1990). Fifteen of the 16 prototypes were destroyed in December 1988 and the sole remaining prototype has not been seen since. Porsche later disclosed that it kept it hidden from public at a warehouse near Zuffenhausen.

== Production figures ==
Porsche	Total	Subtotal	Grand total
964 C2 Coupé	18,219	34,398	62,172
964 C2 Cabrio	11,013	34,398	62,172
964 C2 Targa	3,534	34,398	62,172
964 C2 Cabrio turbo-look	1,532	34,398	62,172
964 C2 Speedster	936	34,398	62,172
964 C4 Coupé	13,353	20,395	62,172
964 C4 Cabrio	4,802	20,395	62,172
964 C4 Targa	1,329	20,395	62,172
964 C4 Jubilee Coupé	911	20,395	62,172
964 Turbo 3.3	3,660	5,097	62,172
964 Turbo 3.6	1,437	5,097	62,172
964 Carrera RS 3.6 Coupé	2,282	2,282	62,172

== Acceleration test results ==
Model:	911 Carrera 2	911 RS America	911 Turbo 3.3	911 Turbo 3.6
0–60 mph (0–97 km/h):	4.8 s	4.6 s	4.4 s	4.0 s
0–100 mph (0–161 km/h):	11.9 s	11.6 s	10.7 s	9.2 s
0–130 mph (0–209 km/h):	22.3 s	22.8 s	20 s	-
0–150 mph (0–241 km/h):	-	-	38.4 s	-
1/4 mile:	13.3s at 106 mph (171 km/h)	13.3s at 105 mph (169 km/h)	12.9s at 108 mph (174 km/h)	12.4s at 114 mph (183 km/h)
Top Speed	264 km/h (164 mph)	255 km/h (158 mph)	275 km/h (171 mph)	289 km/h (180 mph)
