= Patrice Goueslard =

French racing driver (born 1965)

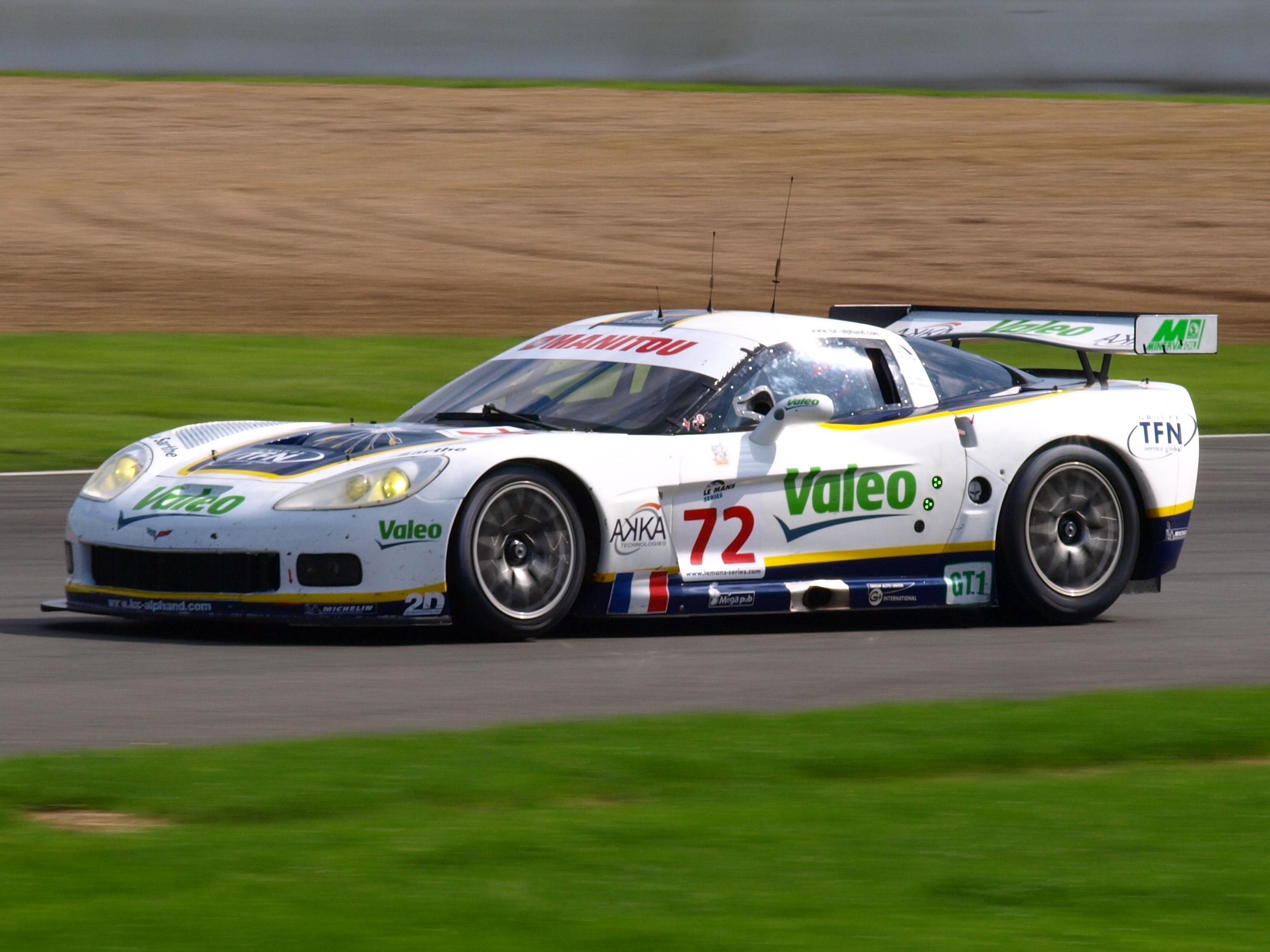
- Goueslard in 2008.
- Nationality: (France) French
- Born: 26 November 1965 (age 60) Caen, France
- Categorisation: FIA Gold (until 2012); FIA Silver (2013–2016); FIA Bronze (2023–)

Previous series
- 2011–2013 2011 2004–2010 1997–2005 2000, 2002 1998–2001 2001 1998 1996 1995–1996 1990–1993: Blancpain Endurance Series; Euro-Racecar Series; Le Mans Series; French GT Championship; Rolex Sports Car Series; FIA GT Championship; American Le Mans Series; USRRC; BPR Global GT Series; Porsche Carrera Cup France; French Formula Renault

Championship titles
- 2013 2008–2010 2010 1997, 2002–2003 1995: Blancpain Gentleman Trophy; Le Mans Series (GT1); ILMC (GT1); French GT Championship Porsche Carrera Cup France (Class B)
24 Hours of Le Mans career
- Years: 1994 – 2010
- Teams: Elf Haberthur Racing, Larbre Compétition, Schübel Engineering, Luc Alphand Aventures
- Best finish: 3rd (1997, 2006)
- Class wins: 0
- Statistics up to date as of 22:09, 13 February 2014 (UTC).

Patrice Goueslard (born 26 November 1965) is a French racing driver. He competed in the 24 Hours of Le Mans each year from 1999 until 2010, having initially made his debut at the event in 1994. His best finish in the event came in 2006, when he and Larbre Compétition drivers Luc Alphand and Jérôme Policand took seventh overall, and third in the GT1 category. In addition to this, he has won the French GT Championship and the GT1 category of the Le Mans Series on three occasions each, as well as the Gentleman Trophy category of the Blancpain Endurance Series on one occasion.

== Racing career ==
=== Early career ===
Goueslard began his auto racing career in 1990, whilst competing in the Championnat de France Formule Renault, with his best finish in the series being 11th in 1993. He made his debut in the 24 Hours of Le Mans the following year, driving for Elf Haberthur Racing with Olivier Haberthur and Patrick Vuillaume, but a turbocharger failure on the team's Porsche 911 Turbo forced them to retire. That year, he also competed in the Porsche Carrera Cup France, finishing fifth in Class B. He remained in the series for the next two seasons, finishing sixth in 1995 (winning Class B in the process), and fourth in 1996. In the latter year, he also competed in the BPR Global GT Series, driving for Larbre Competition in a GT2-class Porsche 911 GT2, and he finished the season in 21st place. He also drove for Larbre Competition at the 24 Hours of Le Mans, finishing 20th overall, and seventh in the GT2 class.

=== 1997–1999 ===
In 1997, Goueslard started his season with a class win in the 24 Hours of Daytona, driving a Porsche 911 GT2 entered by Roock Racing. Goueslard spent the majority of the season competing in the French GT Championship with Larbre, and, partnering Christophe Bouchut for most of the season, took the title at his first attempt, with ten wins. During the season, he also drove a Porsche 911 GT1 alongside Armin Hahne and Pedro Lamy at the 24 Hours of Le Mans, helping the Schübel Engineering effort to finish fifth overall, and third in the GT1 category; as well as competing in one race of the inaugural FIA GT Championship with Larbre, in which he scored a single point.

Goueslard started the 1998 with a third in the 24 Hours of Daytona, driving for Larbre Competition. He remained in the French GT Championship, but was unable to retain his title, despite winning five races; instead, he finished third. A pair of outings with Larbre Competition in the FIA GT Championship did not yield any points, whilst he, Jean-Luc Chéreau and Pierre Yver took 23rd overall, and ninth in the GT2 category in the 24 Hours of Le Mans.

In 1999, Goueslard won four races of the French GT Championship on his way to second place in the championship. He drove for Chereau Sports in the 24 Hours of Le Mans, but the team did not complete 70% of the race distance, and were not classified. Three entries in the FIA GT Championship, driving for Haberthur Racing, did not yield any points.

=== 2000–2002 ===
The dawning of the new millennium marked a change of focus for Goueslard, as he began to primarily compete in the FIA GT Championship, entering all ten races of the season, and taking the N-GT class title, with six wins in Larbre Competition's new Porsche 911 GT3-R. He did, however, continue to compete in the French GT Championship, winning one race. In the 24 Hours of Le Mans, he partnered Bouchut and Chéreau, but the trio lasted 34 laps before accident damage forced them to retire.

In 2001, Goueslard would be less successful in the FIA GT Championship; entering ten of the eleven rounds with Larbre, he finished 12th in the NGT category (after competing in nine races), whilst his single GT category with Larbre saw him classified 12th. He won two races of the French GT Championship in 2001, on his way to third overall. In the 24 Hours of Le Mans, Goueslard drove alongside Chéreau and Sebastien Dumez, finishing tenth overall, and fourth in the GT category.

In 2002, Goueslard left the FIA GT Championship, and instead focused on the French GT Championship; with four victories, he took the title, whilst driving for Nourry Team Competition in a Porsche 911 GT2. He partnered Bouchut and Vincent Vosse at the 24 Hours of Le Mans, and the trio took 18th overall, and fourth in class.

=== 2003–2005 ===
For 2003, Goueslard switched back to Larbre Competition in the French GT Championship, and retained his title, winning two races in the process. At the 24 Hours of Le Mans, he drove alongside Bouchut and Steve Zacchia, and they finished 16th overall, and fourth in the GTS category. In 2004, Larbre Competition switched to a Ferrari 550-GTS Maranello, and Goueslard was less successful in the French GT Championship; he did not win a race all season, and finished 12th overall. However, he was able, along with teammates Bouchut and Olivier Dupard to take 14th overall, and fifth in class at the 24 Hours of Le Mans, and his only entry in the Le Mans Endurance Series, which came at the 1000 km of Spa, saw him finish second in the GTS class, and tenth overall. In 2005, Goueslard primarily focused on the French GT Championship, and took his final win in the series on the way to tenth in the overall standings. He did also compete in the 24 Hours of Le Mans, and partnered Dupard and Vosse to 12th overall, and fourth in the GT2 category.

=== 2006–2008 ===
In 2006, Goueslard entered each of the six rounds of the Le Mans Series (LMS), now driving for Luc Alphand Aventures in a Chevrolet Corvette C5-R, and finished sixth in the GT1 standings. At the 24 Hours of Le Mans, he, Luc Alphand and Jérôme Policand took seventh overall, and third in class. Goueslard remained with Luc Alphand Aventures in the LMS for 2007, and took third in the series (winning one race), whilst driving the team's new Chevrolet Corvette C6.R. He partnered Policand and Alphand at the 24 Hours of Le Mans, and once again took third in the GT1 class, although the team slipped to 12th overall. He was retained by Luc Alphand Aventures for 2008, and this time, with two victories from five races, won the GT1 category of the LMS. In the 24 Hours of Le Mans, Goueslard, Jean-Luc Blancheman and Laurent Pasquali finished 21st overall, and sixth in class.

=== 2009–2011 ===
The 2009 Le Mans Series season was a repeat of the 2008 season, as Goueslard won two races on the way to winning the GT1 category. However, an accident after 99 laps forced the Corvette C6.R of Goueslard, Alphand and Stephane Gregoire to retire from that year's 24 Hours of Le Mans. In 2010, Goueslard and Luc Alphand Aventures switched to the Saleen S7-R, and dominated the GT1 category of the Le Mans Series, taking four out of five possible victories on the way to their third title in a row. At the 24 Hours of Le Mans, however, they retired for the second year in a row; this time, the trio of Goueslard, Julien Jousse and Xavier Maassen completed 238 laps.

Goueslard left Luc Alphand Aventures in 2011, after not securing a new contract. Instead, he moved to the Euro-Racecar NASCAR Touring Series, competing in the opening two rounds, and eventually being classified 38th overall in the Elite class, with 53 points. Following these events, he announced that he would be competing in the new Blancpain Endurance Series, driving for Team SOFREV ASP in a Ferrari 458 Italia. He did not win a race, however, and was classified 20th in the GT3 Pro Cup.

=== 2012–2014 ===
In 2012, Goueslard remained with SOFREV in the Blancpain Endurance Series, and was classified fourth in the GT3 Pro-Am Cup. In 2013, Goueslard competed in the Blancpain Endurance Series' Gentleman Trophy category, and, still driving for SOFREV, won the category, with three victories from five races. In an interview with Endurance-info.com, he revealed that he preferred the GT1 cars he had used in the LMS to the GT3 cars of the Blancpain Endurance Series, and that he hoped to find a budget to remain in GT racing for the 2014 season.

== Racing record ==
=== 24 Hours of Le Mans results ===
Year	Team	Co-Drivers	Car	Class	Laps	Pos.	Class Pos.
1994	(Switzerland) Elf Haberthur Racing	(Switzerland) Olivier Haberthur (France) Patrick Vuillaume	Porsche 911 Turbo 6.3	GT2	42	DNF	DNF
1996	(France) Larbre Compétition	(Germany) André Ahrlé (France) Patrick Bourdais	Porsche 911 GT2	GT1	284	20th	6th
1997	(Germany) Schübel Engineering	(Portugal) Pedro Lamy (Germany) Armin Hahne	Porsche 911 GT1	GT1	331	5th	3rd
1998	(France) Larbre Compétition	(France) Pierre Yver (France) Jean-Luc Chéreau	Porsche 911 GT2	GT	240	23rd	9th
1999	(France) Chéreau Sports (France) Larbre Compétition	(France) Pierre Yver (France) Jean-Luc Chéreau	Porsche 911 GT2	GT	240	NC	NC
2000	(France) Larbre Compétition	(France) Christophe Bouchut (France) Jean-Luc Chéreau	Porsche 911 GT3-R	GT	34	DNF	DNF
2001	(France) Larbre Compétition	(France) Jean-Luc Chéreau (France) Sébastien Dumez	Porsche 911 GT3-RS	GT	274	12th	4th
2002	(France) Larbre Compétition	(France) Christophe Bouchut (Belgium) Vincent Vosse	Chrysler Viper GTS-R	GTS	319	18th	4th
2003	(France) Larbre Compétition	(France) Christophe Bouchut (Switzerland) Steve Zacchia	Chrysler Viper GTS-R	GTS	317	16th	4th
2004	(France) Larbre Compétition	(France) Christophe Bouchut (France) Olivier Dupard	Ferrari 550-GTS Maranello	GTS	317	14th	5th
2005	(France) Larbre Compétition	(Belgium) Vincent Vosse (France) Olivier Dupard	Ferrari 550-GTS Maranello	GT1	324	12th	4th
2006	(France) Larbre Compétition	(France) Luc Alphand (France) Jérôme Policand	Chevrolet Corvette C5-R	GT1	346	7th	3rd
2007	(France) Larbre Compétition	(France) Luc Alphand (France) Jérôme Policand	Chevrolet Corvette C6.R	GT1	327	12th	7th
2008	(France) Luc Alphand Aventures	(France) Jean-Luc Blanchemain (France) Laurent Pasquali	Chevrolet Corvette C6.R	GT1	325	21st	6th
2009	(France) Luc Alphand Aventures	(France) Luc Alphand (France) Stéphan Grégoire	Chevrolet Corvette C6.R	GT1	99	DNF	DNF
2010	(France) Luc Alphand Aventures	(France) Julien Jousse (Netherlands) Xavier Maassen	Chevrolet Corvette C6.R	GT1	238	DNF	DNF
