= 1999 24 Hours of Le Mans =

67th 24 Hours of Le Mans endurance race

Previous: 1998	Next: 2000
Index: Races | Winners

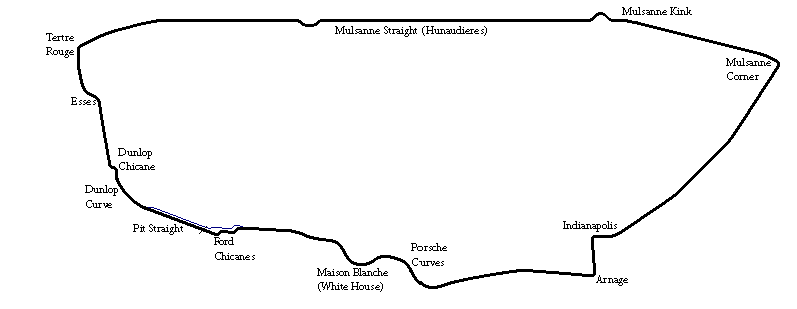
Le Mans in 1999

The 1999 24 Hours of Le Mans was a motor race held at the Circuit de la Sarthe, Le Mans, France on 12 and 13 June 1999. It was the 67th 24 Hours of Le Mans. The race was won by the BMW V12 LMR prototype of Yannick Dalmas, Pierluigi Martini, and Joachim Winkelhock. Lauded by commentators as one of the best races of the decade, it had equal measure drama, tension and excitement to thrill the crowd. The race had major commitment from more works teams with Toyota, Mercedes-Benz, BMW, Audi, Nissan, Panoz and Riley & Scott all represented. New regulations had moved the GT and Sports prototypes far closer together – closed-top coupés versus open-top spyders. BMW had won Le Mans as an engine-manufacturer with McLaren in 1995 and first competed in the 1928 race. However, their victory was overshadowed by three almost identical accidents with the Mercedes cars – twice during practice with Mark Webber and then in the fifth hour to Peter Dumbreck. At one of the fastest places on the circuit, his car lifted and got airborne, somersaulting three times into the trees next to the track. Incredibly, Dumbreck emerged shaken but unscathed.

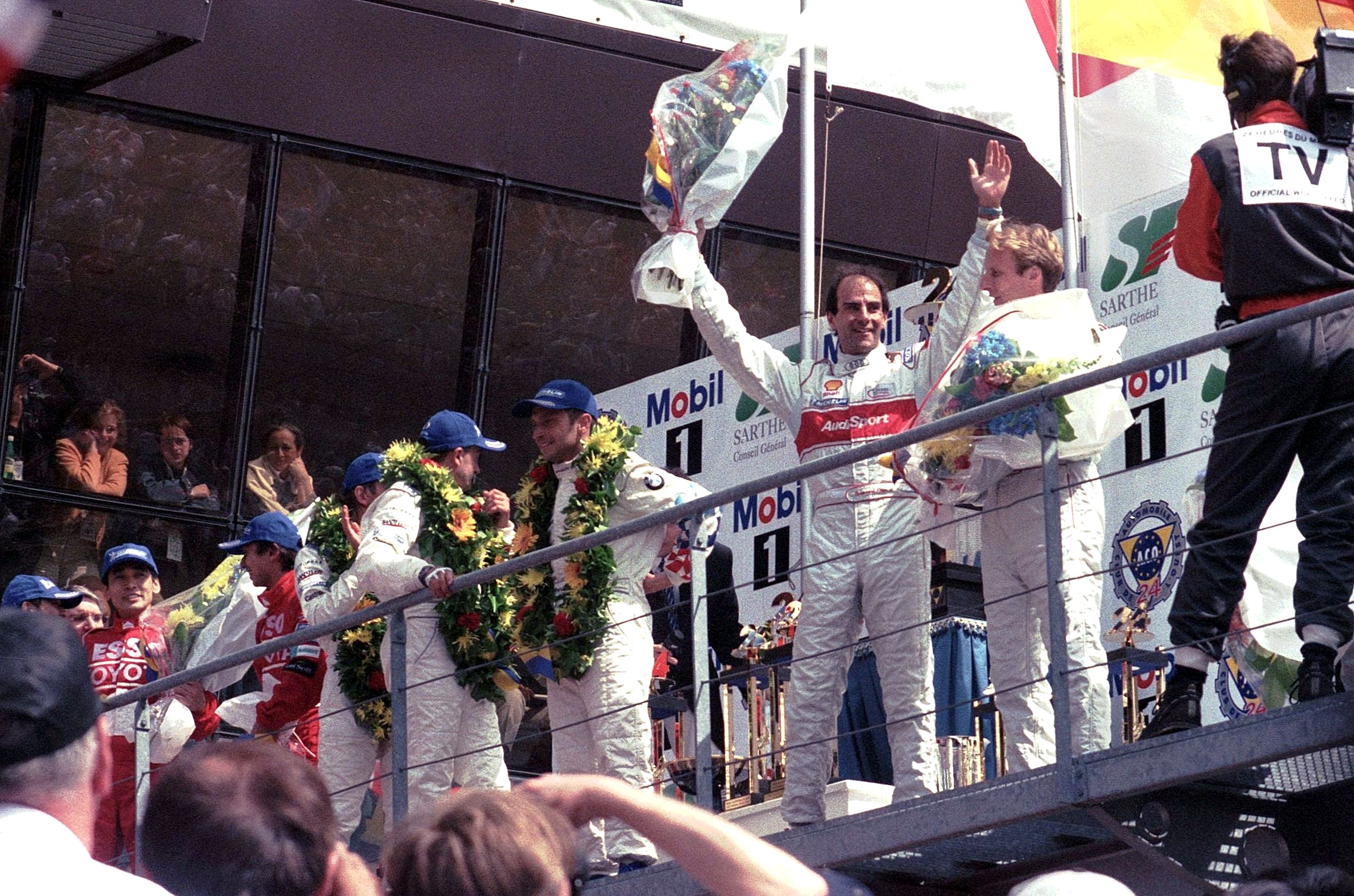
Podium for the overall result – Toyota, BMW and Audi teams respectively

With such a strong, diverse field a great race was expected, and it proved to be so. From the start, two cars each from Toyota, Mercedes and BMW all duelled for the lead. After the Mercedes team was withdrawn and the lead Toyota fell back with gearbox issues, it became a close 3-car race into the night. However. when Thierry Boutsen had a major crash at 3am at the fast, sweeping Dunlop curve, it left the two BMW works cars with a comfortable lead. That changed again at midday though, when the throttle stuck open on JJ Lehto's leading BMW, pitching him violently into the track barriers. The last four hours of the race were highlighted by an exciting back-and-forth battle between the remaining, all-Japanese, Toyota and the BMW running on the same lap, which was only resolved in the final hour when the former had a puncture at high speed and lost seven minutes in the pits. The renamed GTS class was dominated by the Chrysler Vipers, with the works ORECA team finishing 1-2 ahead of four other customer cars. This was the final race for Henri Pescarolo who signed off his record-breaking 33rd start as a driver with a 9th place overall while, following his big accident, Thierry Boutsen also announced his retirement.

== Regulations ==
The lip-service that the big works-teams had been paying to the GT regulations was finally addressed by the Automobile Club de l'Ouest (ACO). The ACO changed the name of their LM-GT1 class to LM-GTP to face that reality. Homologation approval was no longer required, nor the 3-year notice period for major technical modifications. There was now a closer alignment between the GTPs and the Prototypes. Essentially, the ACO saw them as equivalent with the key difference being that the GTPs were closed-top while the Prototypes were open-top. Both classes had a maximum width of 200 cm, and the area of flat-bottom floor now had to cover the full width. The maximum engine size for both was 4.0-litres if turbocharged. Normally-aspirated maximums were 6.0-litres for the prototypes and 8.0-litres for GTS. Technical aids like traction control and ABS-brakes were now banned, even if previously homologated. Likewise, automatic gearboxes were disallowed, as were electronic or hydraulically controlled differentials. The fuel-tank volumes were standardised between the prototypes and GT cars. Formerly 80 and 100 litres respectively, they were all aligned to now be 90 litres. There was a difference though with tyre-widths, with the prototypes allowed 16" versus the 14" of the GTP. Finally, the prototype class was split into two divisions, rated on minimum weights of 900 kg and 650 kg. Designer Tony Southgate put it thus:

"Now that the sportscars have the same fuel tank, they've come much, much closer to GTs. They also have rear diffusers, which gives them about 10% more downforce. Some cars now have F3000 type roll-hoops, which gives them a little less drag than before. Generally, the GTs have a little less drag, so they should be quicker on the straight. They are slightly more efficient, although it's not night and day. However, they use 14% smaller tyres, so theoretically they should be slower round corners. GTs also have bigger engine restrictors, so they have more power."

The complete dominance of Mercedes-Benz in the 1998 series had seen the other teams abandon the GT1 class and the Fédération Internationale de l'Automobile (FIA) had dropped the GT1 class from their series. The ACO renamed its LM-GT2 class as LM-GTS, and cars had to have a metal chassis. A loosening of the air-restrictor and turbo-boost limits gave a nominal increase in maximum engine power. A new class, LM-GT, was introduced beneath LM-GTS to attract privateers, for regular production models sold in recognised "major countries". The minimum weight for the LM-GTS and LM-GT classes was set at 1100 kg.

The pitwork rules were that only four people could work on the car in the pitlane, while an unlimited number could assist in the team garage. While refuelling, no other activity aside from driver exchange and cleaning could be performed and the engine had to be turned off. Afterward, the engine had to be restarted internally without external assistance. Around the track, new grandstands were built next to the ACO offices, and while extending the commercial and catering area infield of the Dunlop Curve, the workers unearthed an unexploded 25 kg bomb from the Second World War. The circuit also became the first to be fully covered by remote camera surveillance for the race management to enable them to see the whole track. Without other media conflicts this year, the start-time reverted to the standard 4pm. This year, the ACO introduced a new entertainment for the spectators, with a major concert to be held in the later evening. The headline act was the late Bob Marley's band, The Wailers.

== Entries ==
The notable absentee this year was the Porsche works team, having achieved its aim with victory in 1998. It was replaced by another major German organisation: the Volkswagen Group, represented by its subsidiary Audi. This set up a contest between the three German companies (Mercedes-Benz, BMW and Audi) and the two major Japanese teams of Toyota and Nissan; along with the dark-horse entries from Panoz and Courage. The biggest class was the rejuvenated LMP with 20 qualifiers, while the new LM-GT class only attracted four Porsche entries. A notable change this year was the drop in the number of turbo engines involved. The international series for prototypes was renamed the Sports Racing World Cup. Still predominantly a European series, an additional 9th round was held at Kyalami. It drew teams with Ferraris, Riley & Scott, Lola and Tampolli. In recognition of the growing alignment between the ACO and Don Panoz's new American Le Mans Series, the ACO gave automatic entries to class-winners at that flagship event, the Petit Le Mans.

Thus, the automatic entry-list this year included the following class champions:

- 1998 FIA GT Championship GT1 class-winner (AMG-Mercedes)
- 1998 Le Mans 24hr GT1 class-winner (Porsche AG) – not taken up
- 1998 Petit Le Mans GT1 class-winner (Champion Racing)
- 1998 Le Mans 24hr LM-P1 class-winner (Doyle-Risi Racing) – not taken up
- 1998 Petit Le Mans LM-P1 class-winner (Doyle-Risi Racing) – not taken up
- 1998 FIA GT Championship GT2 class-winner (Viper Team ORECA)
- 1998 Le Mans 24hr GT2 class-winner (Viper Team ORECA)
- 1998 Petit Le Mans GT2 class-winner (Freisinger Motorsport)

The pivot in regulations provided much excitement, with another close-fought race in prospect between a number of strong teams. The undoubted speed and development of the Toyotas left journalists placing them as strong favourites.

Class	Quantity	Turbo engines
LMP-900	23 / 20	3 / 3
LMP-650	0 / 0	0 / 0
LM-GTP	8 / 7	5 / 5
LM-GTS	18 / 16	9 / 8
LM-GT	5 / 4	0 / 0
Total Entries	54 / 47	17 / 16

- Note: The first number is the number that pre-qualified, the second the number who started.

=== LMP ===
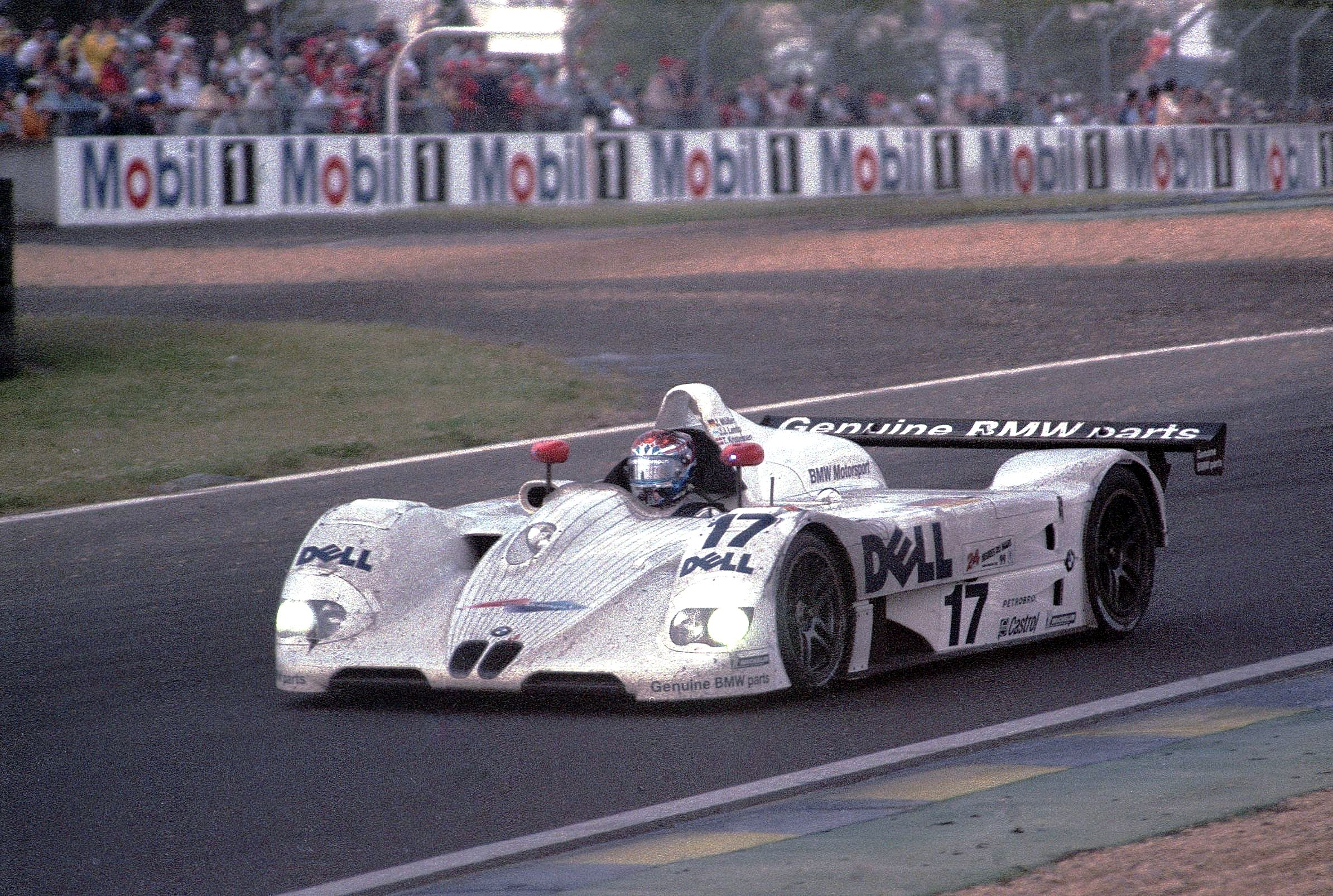
BMW V12 LMR

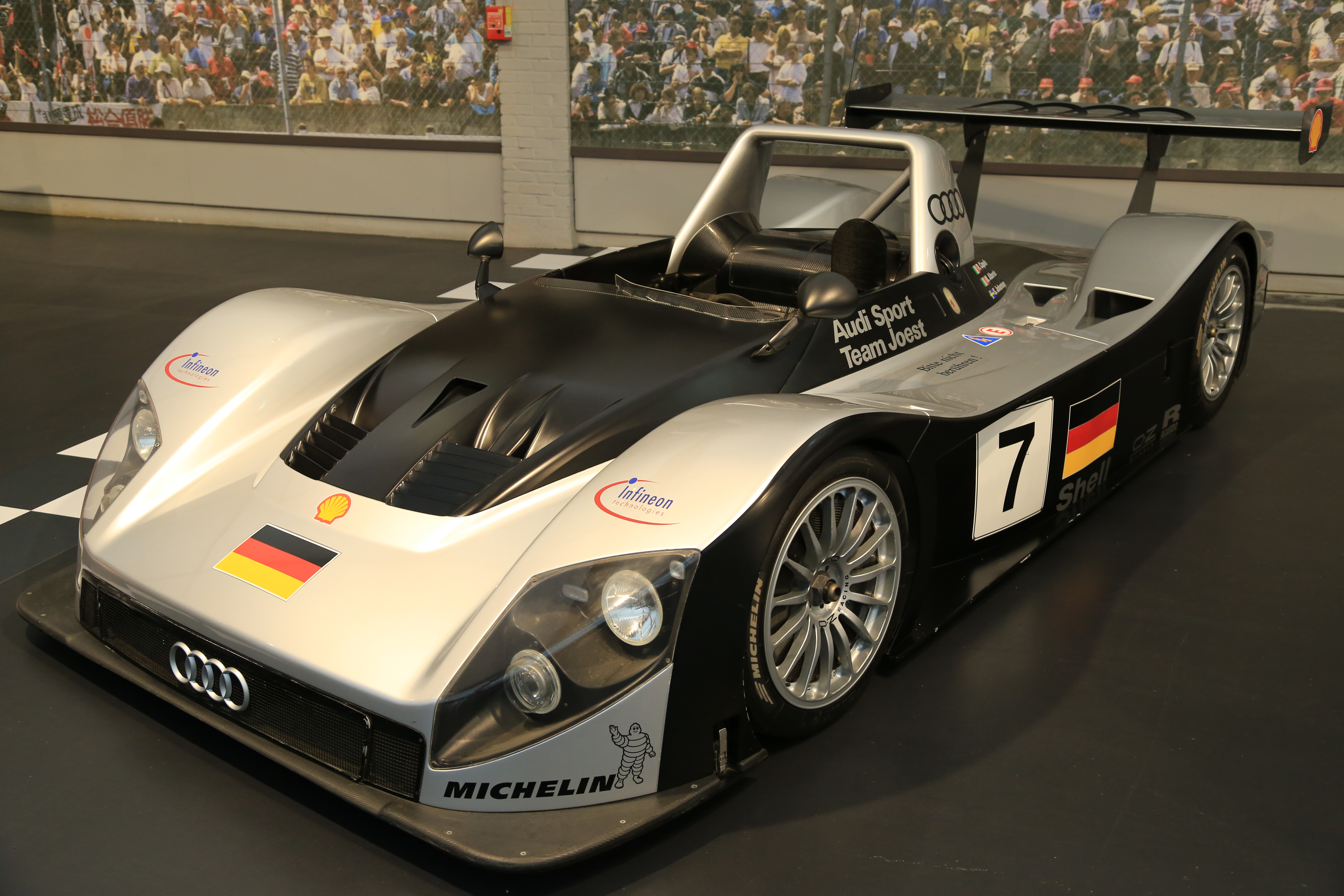
Audi R8R spyder

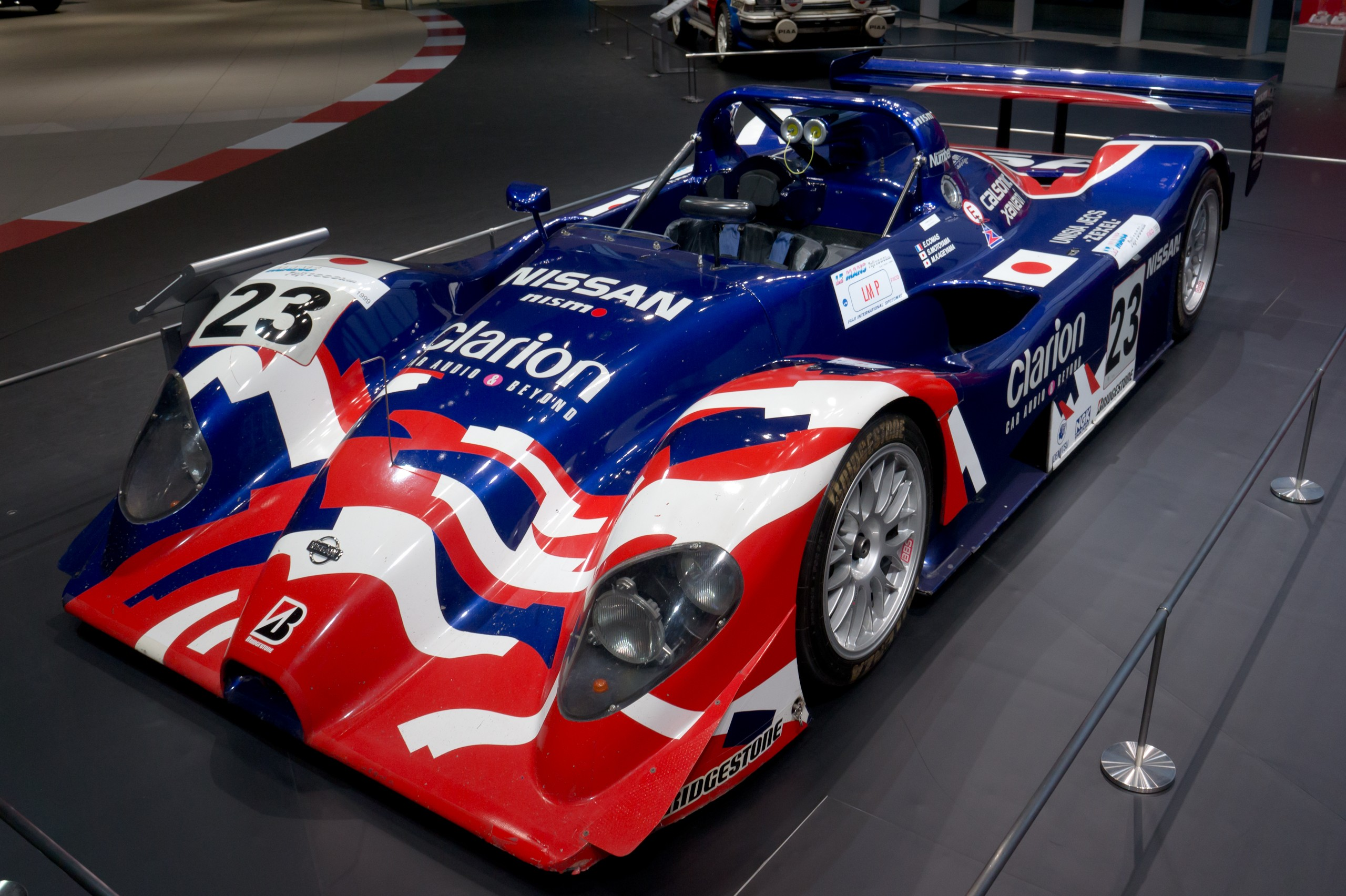
Nissan R391

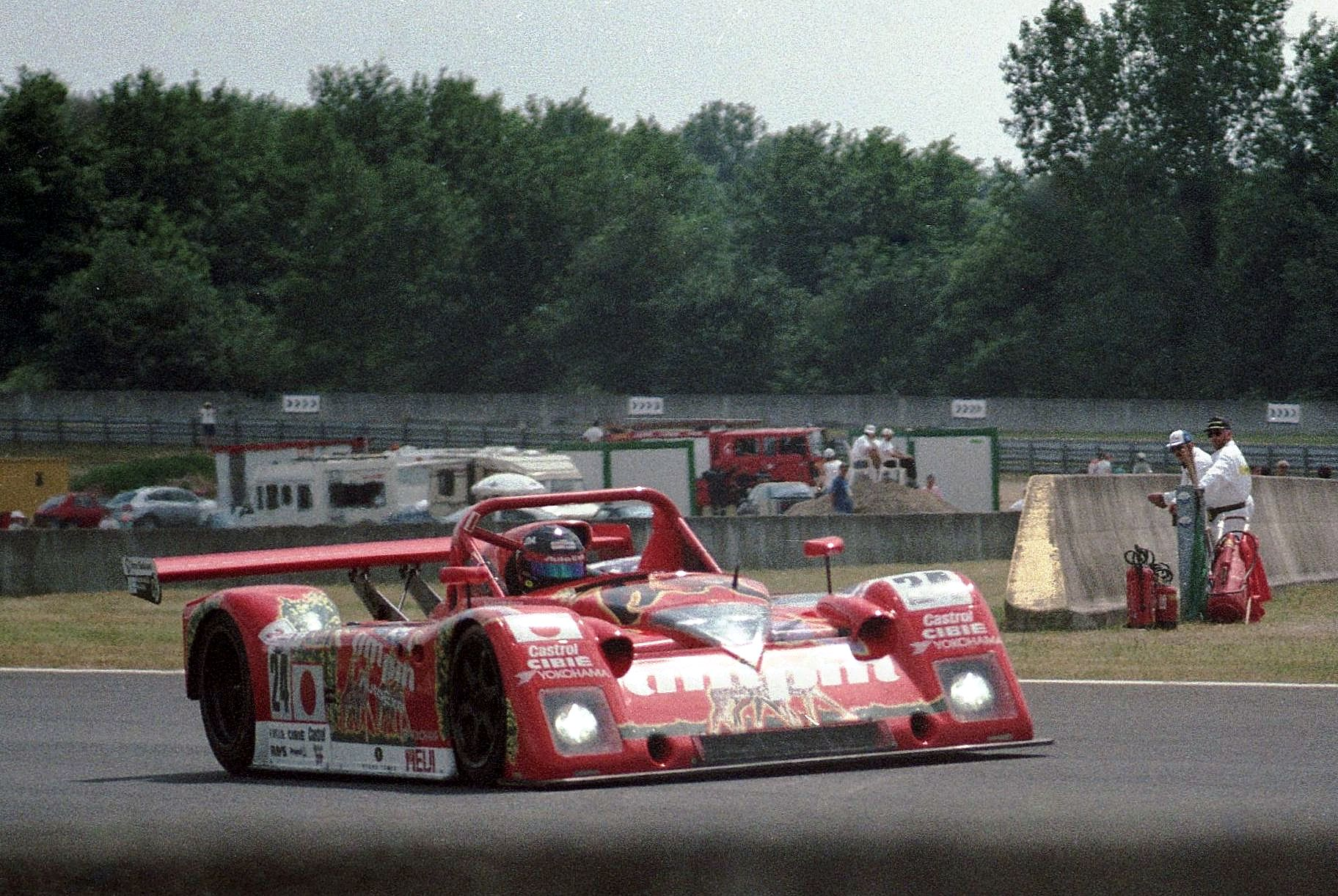
Riley & Scott-Autoexe LMP99

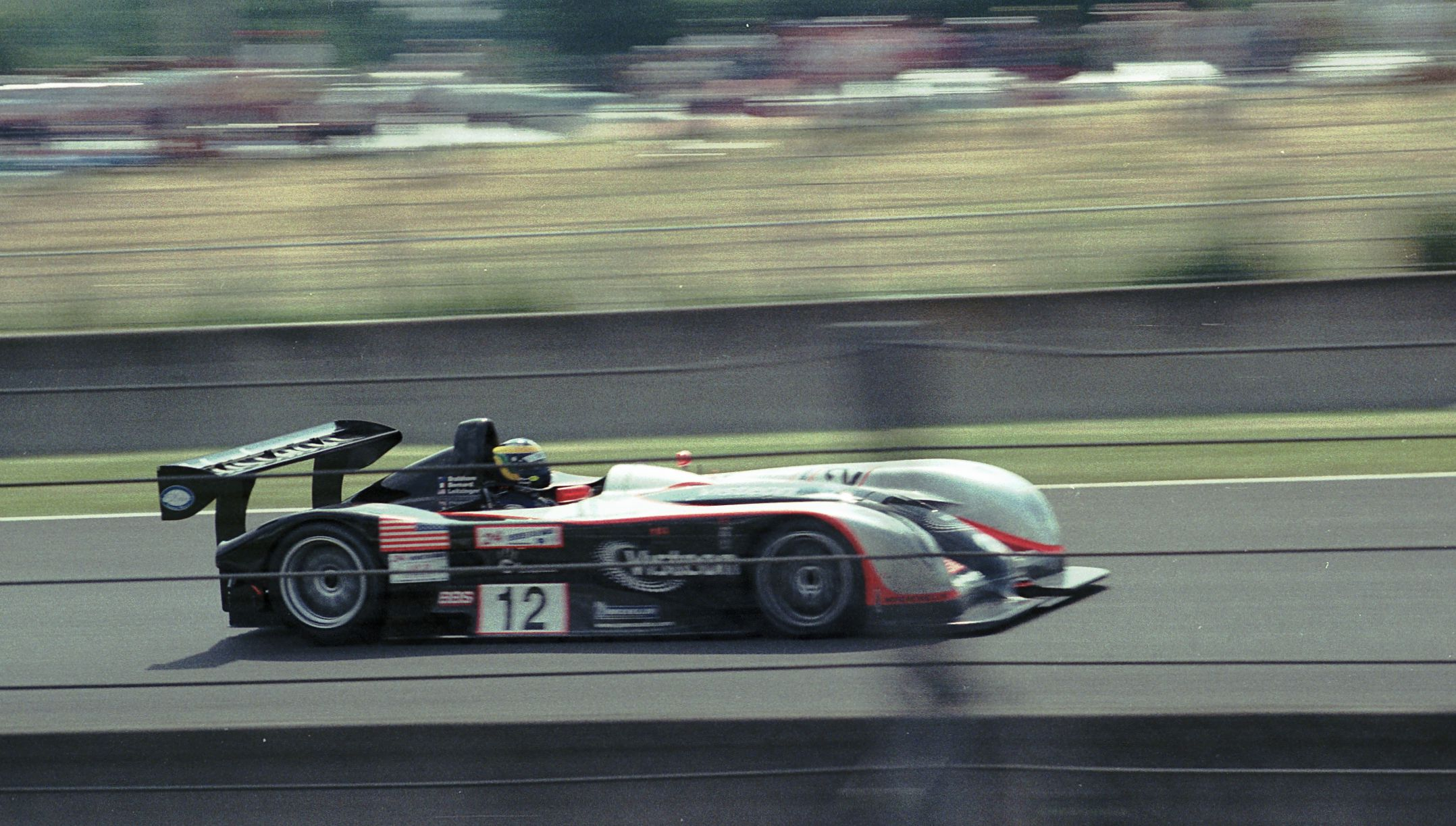
Panoz LMP-1 Roadster-S

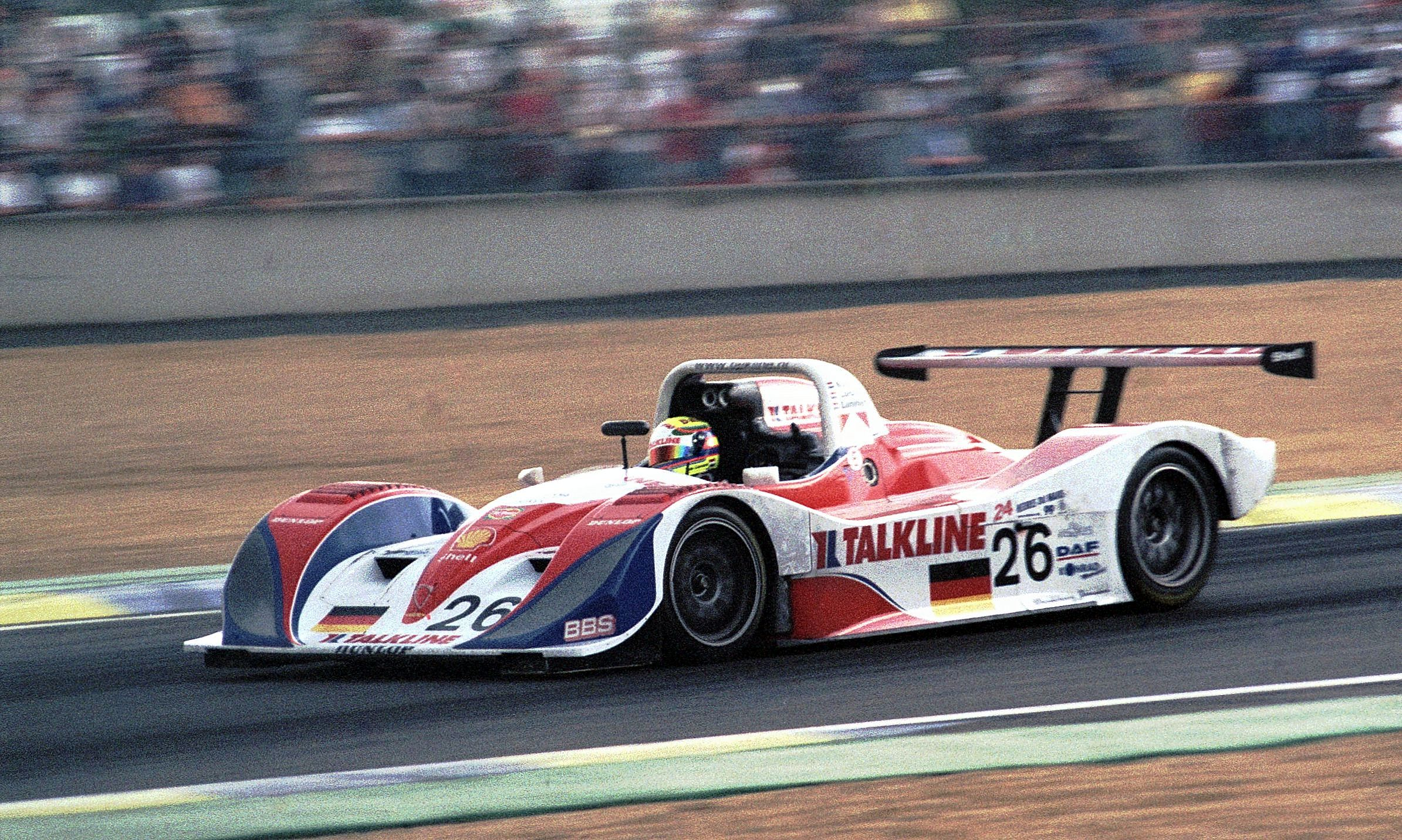
Lola B98-10

The disappointing debut of the BMW prototype in 1998 had warranted a full overhaul. Graham Humphrys was hired as chief designer, with the new model to again be built by Williams Grand Prix Engineering. After summer testing it was found only 68 parts of the almost 3500 components would be carried over into the new car, the BMW V12 LMR. The bodywork redesign had an F1-style roll-bar and offset airbox that improved airflow to the rear wing which, overall, improved downforce. The carbonfibre/honeycomb monocoque chassis was completely new, with the engine set further back to improve weight distribution. Ballast had to be added to bring the weight up to the requisite 900 kg. The upgraded 6.0-litre V12 had better fuel efficiency and could now be tuned up to 570 bhp and reach 325 kph. This year, the cars were run by Team Schnitzer under Charly Lamm in conjunction with BMW Motorsport directors, Mario Theissen and former F1-winner Gerhard Berger. The team now had proven reliability, with JJ Lehto, Jörg Müller and Tom Kristensen winning the Sebring 12 Hours in March. Three cars were sent to Pre-Qualifying although only two arrived on race-week. The one left out was another BMW Art Car, decorated with a design by artist Jenny Holzer. The Sebring-winners kept their lead car, with talismanic triple-winner Yannick Dalmas, Pierluigi Martini and Joachim Winkelhock in the second. This was a new chassis after their original one had been wrecked at Sebring. BMW Motorsport sold their two 1998 cars to privateers Thomas Bscher and Kazumichi Goh. Having both run their McLaren-BMWs previously, they now entered their new BMW prototypes, still fitted with 1998-spec engines. Bscher renewed his partnership with David Price, whom he had raced with in 1995 and 1996. Williams engineer Gordon Day kept the basic set-up of the post-1998 Le Mans version. The aerodynamics were updated after testing in the Williams wind-tunnel, modifying the nose section and increasing the rear wing. Bscher reunited Steve Soper with the car he had raced the year before and brought in Daytona GT-class-winner Bill Auberlen. The Team Goh BMW was also prepared by David Price Racing. Their drivers were an experienced Japanese team of Hiro Matsushita, Hiroki Katoh and Akihiko Nakaya.

Audi could trace its motor-racing legacy back to the great Auto Union Grand Prix cars of the 1930s. Latterly, it had renewed its sporting brand with the Audi Quattro 4-wheel drive which had dominated rallying in the 1980s. Audi Sport GmbH had started work on joining the endurance sportscar championships several years earlier, but the recent changes in ACO regulations left them in a quandary as to which path to follow. Audi chose to do both and sent a pair of cars in each category. The Audi R8R prototype project began in mid-1997, built around a new 3.6-litre DOHC turbocharged engine. This was the first purpose-built race engine by the Audi-group in 60 years. Boosted by twin Garrett turbos, and with the air-inlet restrictors was limited to 550 bhp. A remarkable innovation was merging the rear suspension and gearbox into a single unit that allowed very rapid change-out, facilitated by mounting the rear wing onto the bodywork and exhaust system curved around the support-frame. The R8R was also one of the first sports-cars fitted with power steering. The advanced-composites hull was built by Dallara Automobili, a current manufacturer for the IndyCar Series. Giampaolo Dallara recommended bringing in Tony Southgate, recently with Nissan, to complete the project design, who refined the aerodynamics in Audi's own brand-new wind tunnel facility. The cars made their race debut at Sebring, finishing a creditable third and fifth. New chassis were constructed for Le Mans taking on refinements from that race. Audi had brought on board the highly successful Joest Racing team to run them, having already achieved five outright victories at Le Mans. Joest-winner Michele Alboreto led an experienced touring-car squad including Rinaldo Capello, Laurent Aïello, Emanuele Pirro, Frank Biela and Didier Theys.

Local Le Mans manufacturer Courage Compétition returned for another tilt, with three cars. The new model was the Courage C52, an evolution of the C51 built by modifying two extant chassis. The ongoing partnership with Nissan gave it the VRH35L engine that had previously been tried and tested in the Nissan R390 GT1. This 3.5-litre twin-turbo V8 was a more powerful, yet fuel-efficient unit. Changing from Michelin to Bridgestone tyres warranted a rework of the suspension and rear diffuser. The Courage team ran their car with Italian former F1 drivers Alex Caffi, Andrea Montermini and Domenico Schiattarella. The NISMO works team entered the other C52, operated by Courage with their team-drivers Didier Cottaz/Marc Goossens/Fredrik Ekblom. The La Filière Elf team returned for a fourth year, in conjunction with Henri Pescarolo's new Pescarolo Promotion Racing Team. Their C36 was retired in favour of a newer C50 model that had raced the year before. Sourcing Porsche engines from Joest Racing, the car was prepared by the local company Promotion Racing. This year, "Pesca" raced with Michel Ferté and Patrice Gay. The economic downturn in Japan was affecting many major companies. Nissan was in difficulties and in negotiations with Renault. Under the circumstances, the NISMO racing division saw a final opportunity for Le Mans. They took the bold step to switch classes and bring a brand-new prototype model. Late in 1998, NISMO unveiled its new collaboration with G-Force Precision Engineering in the UK. They brought in Nigel Stroud, Doug Skinner and Chris Rushforth who had all worked on the Panoz GTR-1 when at Reynard. The Nissan R391 was built around the new VRH50A engine. This normally-aspirated 5.0-litre DOHC V8 was an enlarged version of their 4-litre Infiniti engine currently being used in the Indy Racing League. It ran through an evolution of the 6-speed Xtrac sequential gearbox from the R390, Stroud, who had also worked on the Mazda Le Mans rotaries, supervised the aerodynamic development. Alongside their Courage entrant, two of the R391s were built and sent to Pre-qualifying. In 1998, Aguri Suzuki and Masami Kageyama had been two of the first Japanese drivers to be on the Le Mans podium. They, and most of that team, returned in the driving squads this year. The other returnee was Eric van der Poele, who had raced for NISMO in 1997 and won the Spa 24 Hours in 1998.

Although a number of teams were still running the increasingly uncompetitive Ferrari 333 SP in the end only one entrant came to Le Mans. The Doyle-Risi Racing team had two automatic entries from winning the LM-P1 class in both last year's Le Mans and Petit Le Mans. JB Racing ran two cars at the Pre-qualifying and both passed, but they chose not to run them. Instead, the team sent a brand-new chassis for the race. Fitted with the latest iteration of the 4-litre Ferrari V12 engine, and upgraded gearbox, after a week of testing at Circuit Paul Ricard. With their two championship-winning drivers, Collard and Sospiri, drafted into the Toyota squad for this race, the car was raced by regular subs Jérôme Policand and Christian Pescatori to join the other team driver, and 1994 race-winner, Mauro Baldi. In contrast, three of their perennial Riley & Scott competition were at Le Mans with the new Mark III Series 2. The main change was installing a transverse Hewland gearbox to replace the longitudinal GeaRace unit. A new rear bulkhead was fashioned to bring the powertrain forward, which in turn needed a new fuel cell and moving the rear wing. All this lowered the chassis, pared off 10 kg weight and improved the effectiveness of the new rear diffuser. Philippe Gache and Thierry Lecourt, having run a Mark III in the ISRS, were appointed as the Riley & Scott agents in Europe, and now ran as a works-supported team. Their cars were rebuilt to the new specification albeit to different weight limits to allow different air restrictors. The third car was a special lightweight chassis commissioned by the Japanese AutoExe Motorsports. Led by 20-race veteran Yojiro Terada, it sported an exotic zoological-themed paintjob.

This year Panoz Motorsport stepped across to the LMP class and arrived with another audacious car. Former March designer Andy Thorby's original proposal was a mid- or rear-engined coupé with a new Cosworth powerplant. However, this went against the Panoz ethos, and the idea was scrapped in December. Instead, the Esperante GTR-1 was reworked to the LMP format. An open-top spyder, its aerodynamics were developed at the Jordan F1 team's wind-tunnel keeping the profile as low as possible, and with an F1-style rollbar behind the driver-seat. The nose was reshaped to improve downforce and the wheelbase lengthened. With the gearbox mounted in the rear and the driver position pushed back behind the centreline, they counterbalanced the hefty 6.0-litre Ford V8. Now prepared by Yates Engine Development, the engine put out 620 bhp with the restrictors. Two cars were entered by the works team. Regular driver David Brabham took the car to Pre-qualifying where he impressed and was joined by Éric Bernard and Butch Leitzinger. The second car had Johnny O'Connell, Max Angelelli and ex-F1 rookie Jan Magnussen.

Martin Birrane, an Irishman businessman and former Le Mans driver, had acquired the Lola Cars company in 1997. Their first new sports-car prototype was the Lola B98/10, designed for customer sales and to be able to carry a range of engines. The monocoque built out of advanced composites was a structural unit with the steel frame. The 6-speed gearbox was derived from the Hewland one used in the current Lola CART cars. Eight cars were completed by early 1999 with Konrad Motorsport being one of the first customers, to run in the ALMS. Kremer Racing and DAMS bought chassis for the SRWC and all three teams came to Le Mans with diverse set-ups. The Kremer car had a Roush-prepared 6-litre Ford V8 engine (potential 740 bhp), while the DAMS entry had a 4.0-litre Judd V10 (620 bhp). Franz Konrad had started the American series with the 3.5-litre twin-turbo as used in the Lotus Elise GT1 project, however for Le Mans he dropped in a Roush-Ford V8, as well as adding an extended tail. This entry was driven by the Racing for Holland team, with experienced Dutch drivers Jan Lammers, Peter Kox and Tom Coronel.

=== LM-GTP ===
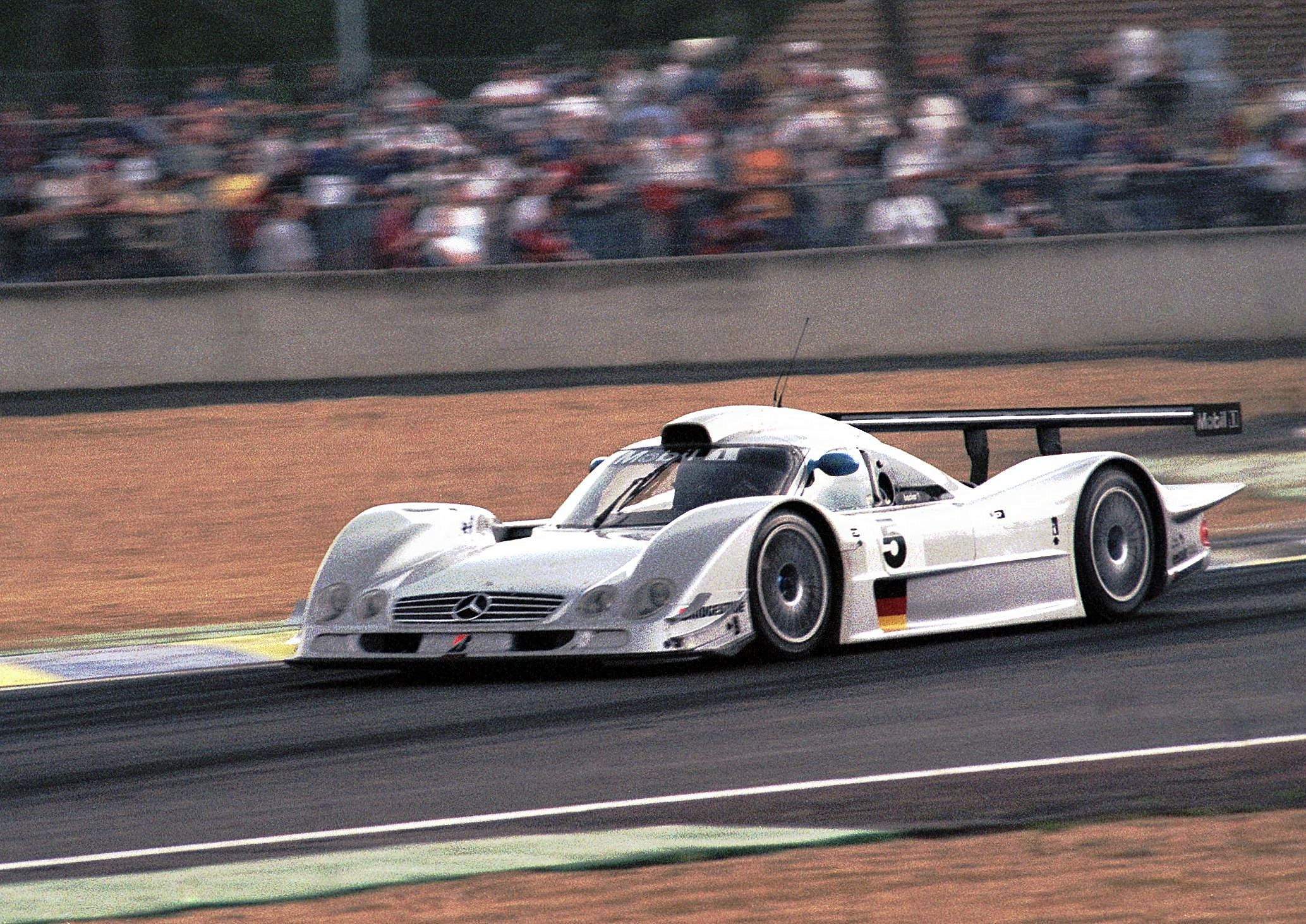
Mercedes CLR

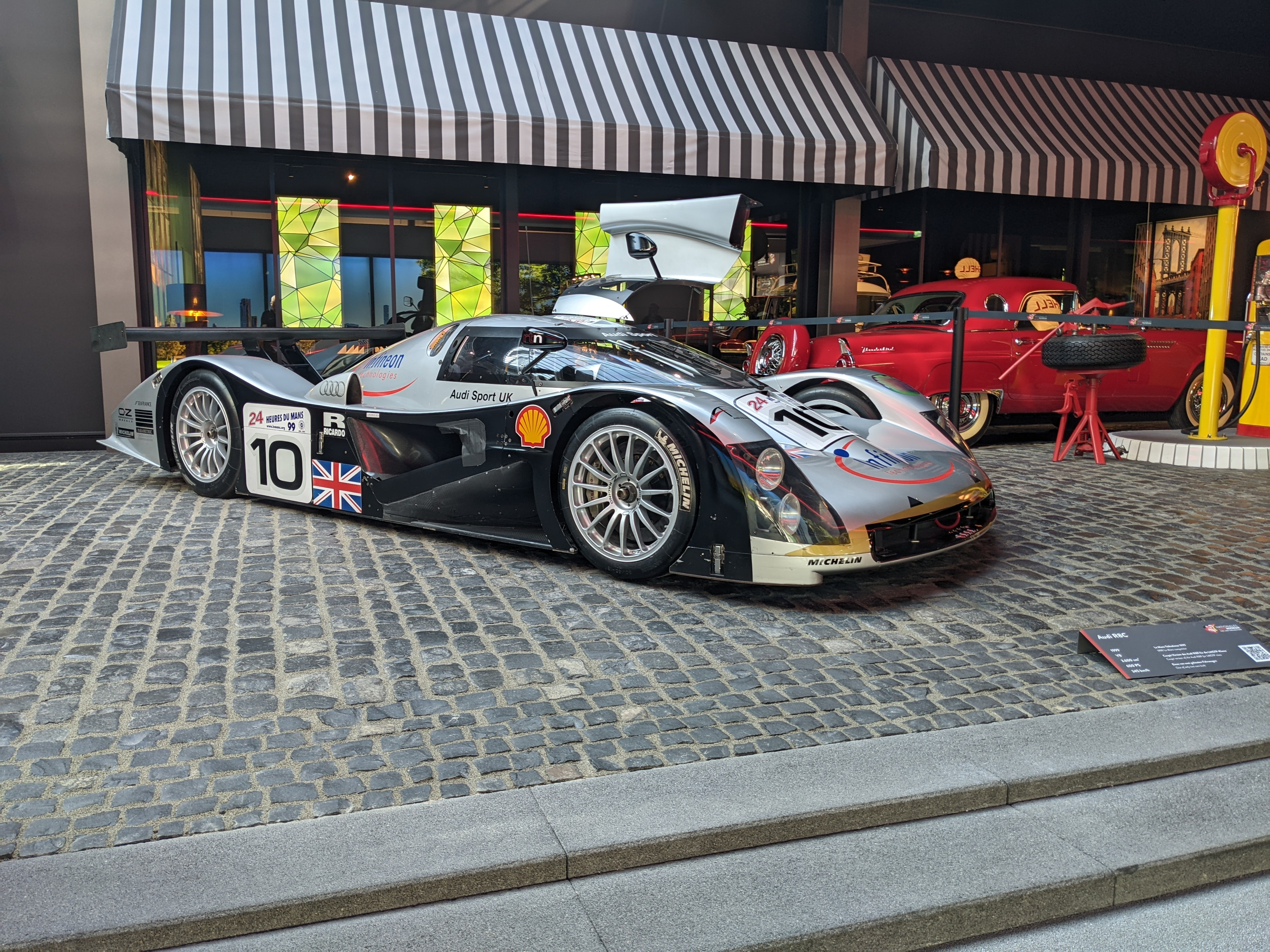
Audi R8C coupé

The all-conquering Mercedes-Benz team of 1998 had, by their own admission, been underprepared for Le Mans. Freed of the (limited) restrictions of the GT1 regulations, AMG set out to design a dedicated GT prototype. The new CLR was quite similar to the CLK-LM. The most notable difference was the new engine – a 5.7-litre 32-valve V8 which also produced about the restricted 600 bhp like its predecessor. It had a shorter wheelbase, with longer overhangs front and rear. The design started in September, with the first chassis ready in February. It was put through almost 30000 miles of high-speed testing at Fontana, USA and Magny-Cours and Hockenheim in Europe. Three cars were prepared for Le Mans with the experienced sports-car drivers Bernd Schneider, Franck Lagorce and Christophe Bouchut backed up by and international cast of promising, young single-seater drivers including Pedro Lamy, Nick Heidfeld, Peter Dumbreck and Mark Webber.

After the anguish of the 1998 race, Toyota Motorsport Europe returned with three new GT-One chassis. The problematic gearboxes had been heavily revised and strengthened. Along with the mandatory removal of the ABS and traction-control systems, other work on weight-saving with the engine, turbos and chassis meant the ballast added to get over the 900 kg minimum could be placed to facilitated road-holding. The 3.6-litre DOHC twin-turbo was limited to its 600 bhp but with the aerodynamic refinements, the cars could reach 350 kph on the Mulsanne Straight. Thousands of kilometres of testing were done at Paul Ricard and Catalunya circuits and nothing was left to chance. Over 130 Toyota crew came to the race for the event. The driver line-ups were stacked with experience: 1990 Le Mans winner Martin Brundle was joined by 1998 ISRS champions Emmanuel Collard and Vincenzo Sospiri, while Thierry Boutsen and Ralf Kelleners by erstwhile Porsche rival, and race-winner last year Allan McNish. The successful Japanese trio of Ukyo Katayama, Toshio Suzuki and Keiichi Tsuchiya, that had finished third last year again had the third car.

Audi covered their bases by also developing a pair of closed-cockpit coupés in the GTP class. This was a late addition to the Audi prototype project, with design only starting in September. It was assigned to Audi Sport UK, which was led by former Group C racer Richard Lloyd who had some success with his own developments of the Porsche 962. The R8C shared the basic chassis and engine with the R8R. The air restrictor rules for GTP limited its engine to 600 bhp (as it was 30 kg heavier) that could get the car up to 350 kph. Overall project leader Tony Southgate worked with Peter Elleray on the aerodynamic package. The shell was the bare minimum height permitted for the class. Fitted with gullwing doors, it had a larger front and rear overhang. The narrower GTP tyres also contributed to reducing drag. However, road-testing only started in April and the number of "new-car" issues that cropped up left little time to be resolved (including a door blowing off in Pre-qualifying). A new, lighter gearbox installed for race-week was totally untested. Although built in a similar unified structure as the R8R, the nature of the coupe layout meant a prospective gearbox change would have to take 30 minutes, rather than 10. The two driver line-ups comprised an international crew of Stefan Johansson/Stéphane Ortelli/Christian Abt in one and the British team of James Weaver/Andy Wallace/Perry McCarthy in the other.

=== LM-GTS ===
Chrysler had achieved a commanding 1–2 victory in the 1998 race. This year they arrived in impressive force, with eight Viper GTS-Rs to rival the fleet of Porsches. The works ORECA team had four entries (including two ACO automatic entries) and were supported by a pair, each, from the Chamberlain Engineering and Paul Belmondo Racing customer teams. ORECA saw no need to change a race-proven mechanical package. The engine was remapped to improve fuel consumption and low-end acceleration, and to meet the new regulations, the ABS-system was removed. Fine-tuning of the aerodynamics in the Reynard wind-tunnel further optimised the rear wing and diffuser. Under the ACO regulations, the Vipers were 400 kg lighter than running in the American series. With the demise of the GT1 class, the Vipers were able to win GT championship races outright now. Under team manager Pierre Dieudonné, ORECA had won the two races coming into Le Mans, through Olivier Beretta and Karl Wendlinger, with Jean-Philippe Belloc and David Donohue finishing second both times. For Le Mans, the first three drivers had the lead car. Donohue was teamed up with Dominique Dupuy and Soheil Ayari while the third car had last year's class-winner, Justin Bell with Tommy Archer and Marc Duez. The fourth car was a chassis sold to CICA Concessionaires and operated by Graff Racing with the three Mello-Breyner brothers behind the wheel. Hugh Chamberlain purchased a new car for the 1999 season, alongside a '98 chassis; another new chassis was sold to Pul Belmondo's new team to go alongside an ex-ORECA car.

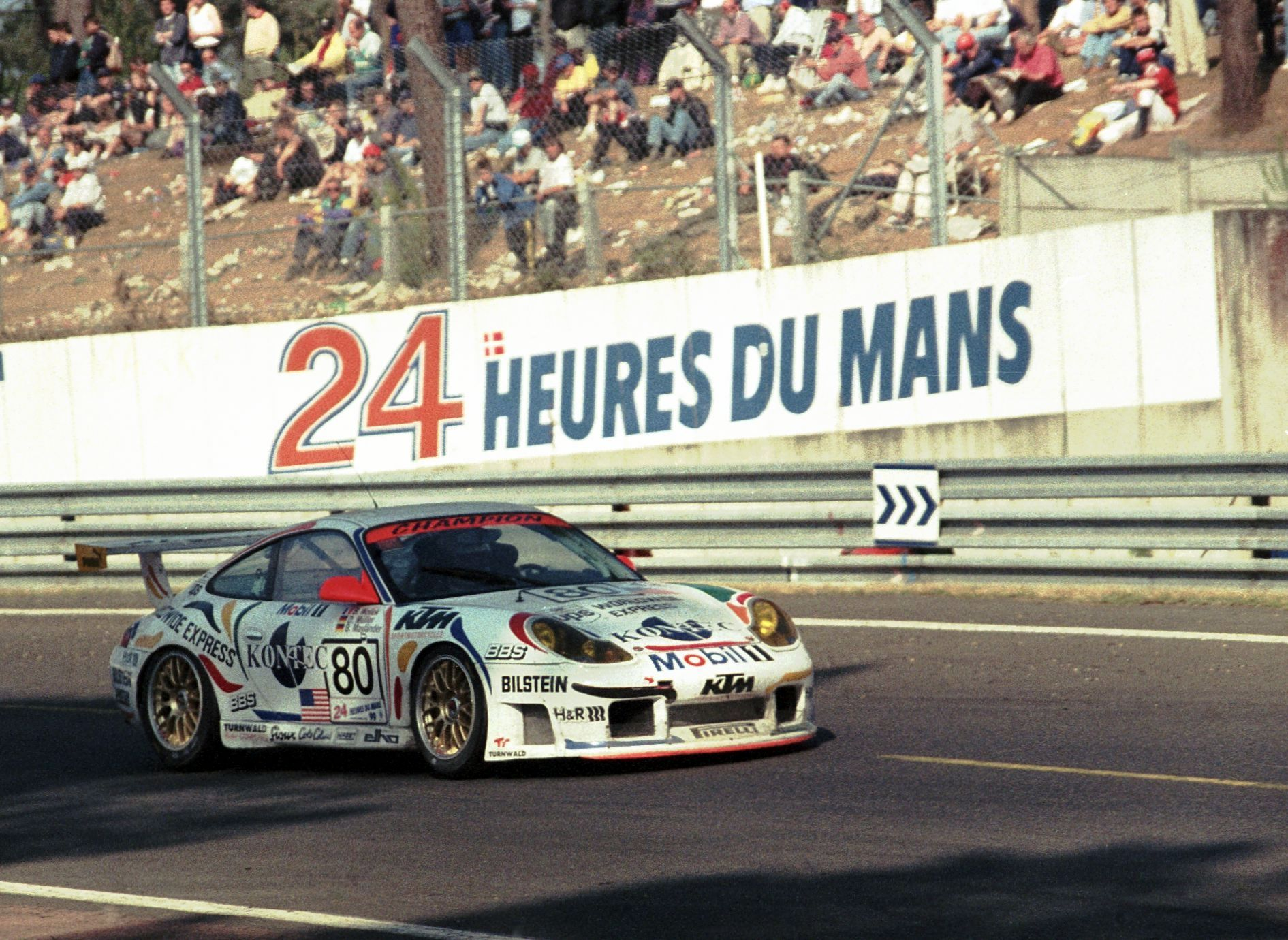
The new styling of the 996-series Porsche

The Porsche 911 had been a constant fixture in GT racing, but this year finally exposed its current iteration to be well behind its competition. Nevertheless, it was still the most well-represented model at the race, with eight 911 GT2s. After their Petit Le Mans success, Freisinger Motorsport arrived with two cars, led by class-winner Michel Ligonnet. The Larbre/Chéreau partnership again had two entries. Jean-Pierre Jarier (1970s F1-driver and current French GT Champion) led the Larbre car, while team-owner Jean-Luc Chéreau was in the second. One of his co-drivers was Pierre Yver, who had competed in every Le Mans through the decade. The Roock Racing Team also returned to run two cars and their regular drivers from the GT Championship. Franz Konrad backed up new Lola prototype with his ISRS Porsche, and the Portuguese Monteiro brothers brought back their privateer car.

=== LM-GT ===
The new GT class was designed for non-works teams to run near-production spec cars. In this inaugural year, it was the sole preserve of Porsche and its ubiquitous 911-model. In 1998, Porsche had released the totally-reworked 996-series of the 911, to replace its previous 993-styled iteration and this year the racing version, the 911 GT3, was released for customer sale. It was based on the Porsche Supercup specification to modify the 3.6-litre M96/77 engine by giving it an extra 40 bhp. The first two purchasers were Olaf Manthey and Dave Moraj. Porsche works drivers Uwe Alzen and veteran Bob Wollek were released to drive and assist with the car "shakedowns" and race preparation to optimise their set up for the teams, and future customers. Manthey Racing had won the Supercup series in 1997 and 1998 and for their first tilt at Le Mans had Alzen, Patrick Huisman and Luca Riccitelli as drivers. Moraj's Champion Racing team had an automatic entry after winning the GT1 class (and finishing 3rd overall) at the 1998 Petit Le Mans. His drivers were Wollek, with German touring car racers Dirk Müller and Bernd Mayländer. The other two Porsches in the class were older 993-spec cars of privateers Thierry Perrier and Gerard MacQuillan. MacQuillan had previously had a leg amputated after a racing accident in the 1960s. His Porsche was his 1995 car detuned to the new regulations.

== Practice and Qualifying ==
In the Pre-qualifying weekend the Toyotas, as expected, had initially set the pace with Brundle being quickest with a 3:31.9, fully 6 seconds faster than they had been the year before. However, the biggest surprise was David Brabham, who matched Brundle in the new Panoz roadster with his own 3:31.9. Development was such that all classes were running up to five seconds faster than in 1998. Come race week itself, the biggest drama on the first day's qualifying was a major accident for one of the Nissan R391 prototypes. Eric van der Poele, approaching Tertre Rouge, suddenly found the throttle stuck open and was slammed into the tyre-barrier. Suffering several compressed vertebrae, he was immediately taken to hospital and would spend the next month in traction. A red flag stopped practice, and it took over an hour to get the wrecked Nissan taken away and the barrier repaired. From the restart, no-one could get close to the Toyotas of Brundle (3:29.9) and Boutsen (3:30.8). In fact, Brundle's time was the first sub-3:30 lap since 1993 and the 3.5-litre formula. Brabham carried on the good form of the Panoz, with the 3rd-best time of 3:33.7, almost 4 seconds behind.

Thursday practice was also dominated by a significant accident. The Mercedes drivers were finding their cars very twitchy on the straights, especially in the slipstream of other cars. The accident again occurred in the early evening. Mark Webber was pulling out to pass a slower car on the very fast run down to Indianapolis and when coming over an undulation the nose lifted and the car got airborne at 320 kph (200 mph). It did a full 360° loop before twisting and landing hard on its nose and then thumping the Armco barrier on its wheels. Webber was relieved to emerge unharmed and the undamaged monocoque was repaired overnight. Unfazed by his teammate's travails, Schneider called upon his experience to force his car into the 4th-best time (3:31.5). J J Lehto best him to third in the BMW with a 3:31.2, which pushed the Panoz down to fifth. The other BMW, Toyotas and Mercedes were next. The Audi spyders impressed to be straight up to speed, qualifying 9th (3:34.9) and 11th, both faster than Schneider's 1998 pole time. The coupés, however, needed several gearbox changes of their untested units and only qualified 20th and 23rd with their best time set by Andy Wallace (3:42.9). The other new cars shared the mid-grid with the Ferrari and Riley & Scotts – the remaining Nissan was 12th (3:36.0) with the best Lola beside it (the DAMS car - 3:36.5)

In GTS, Beretta beat his own pole time from the previous year by 3 seconds to take a consecutive GT pole and qualify 27th overall (3:56.6). The Vipers' dominance was such that they took the top five class positions on the grid. The best of the Porsches was the Chéreau car in 32nd – a 4:03.5 driven by Patrice Goueslard, seven seconds back. The new 996 GT3s were obviously a step up on the previous model, with Alzen setting a 4:11.1 (42nd) as quickest in the new LM-GT class. Both the 993s fell afoul of the 125% qualifying rule, although the ACO exercised its discretion to allow the Perrier car into the race (4:27.7). However, being 20 seconds slower that Alzen, the MacQuillan car missed the cut.

=== Starting Grid ===
Class leaders are in bold.

Pos	Class	Team	Pos	Class	Team
Pos	Class	Car	Pos	Class	Car
Pos	Class	Time	Pos	Class	Time
1	**LM-GTP**	**#1 Toyota Motorsport**	2	LM-GTP	#2 Toyota Motorsport
1	**LM-GTP**	Toyota GT-One	2	LM-GTP	Toyota GT-One
1	**LM-GTP**	3:29.93	2	LM-GTP	3:30.80
3	**LMP**	**#17 Team BMW Motorsport**	4	LM-GTP	#6 AMG Mercedes
3	**LMP**	BMW V12 LMR	4	LM-GTP	Mercedes-Benz CLR
3	**LMP**	3:31.21	4	LM-GTP	3:31.54
5	LMP	#12 Panoz Motorsport	6	LMP	#15 Team BMW Motorsport
5	LMP	Panoz LMP-1 Roadster-S	6	LMP	BMW V12 LMR
5	LMP	3:33.71	6	LMP	3:33.93
7	LM-GTP	#5 AMG Mercedes	8	LM-GTP	#3 Toyota Motorsport
7	LM-GTP	Mercedes-Benz CLR	8	LM-GTP	Toyota GT-One
7	LM-GTP	3:34.14	8	LM-GTP	3:34.76
9	LMP	#7 Audi Sport Team Joest	10	LMP	#8 Audi Sport Team Joest
9	LMP	Audi R8R	10	LMP	Audi R8R
9	LMP	3:34.89	10	LMP	3:35.37
11	LMP	#22 NISMO	12	LMP	#25 DAMS
11	LMP	Nissan R391	12	LMP	Lola B98/10
11	LMP	3:36.04	12	LMP	3:36.47
13	LMP	#29 JB Racing	14	LMP	#19 Team Goh
13	LMP	Ferrari 333SP	14	LMP	BMW V12 LM
13	LMP	3:38.47	14	LMP	3:38.48
15	LMP	#21 NISMO	16	LMP	#11 Panoz Motorsport
15	LMP	Courage C52	16	LMP	Panoz LMP-1 Roadster-S
15	LMP	3:39.25	16	LMP	3:39.52
17	LMP	#18 Bscher Racing	18	LMP	#13 Courage Compétition
17	LMP	BMW V12 LM	18	LMP	Courage C52
17	LMP	3:40.36	18	LMP	3:40.68
19	LM-GTP	#10 Audi Sport UK	20	LMP	#27 Kremer Racing
19	LM-GTP	Audi R8C	20	LMP	Lola B98/10
19	LM-GTP	3:42.16	20	LMP	3:43.91
21	LMP	#26 Konrad Motorsport	22	LM-GTP	#9 Audi Sport UK
21	LMP	Lola B98/10	22	LM-GTP	Audi R8C
21	LMP	3:43.97	22	LM-GTP	3:45.20
23	LMP	#24 Autoexe Motorsports	24	LMP	#14 La Filière Elf
23	LMP	Riley & Scott LMP99	24	LMP	Courage C50
23	LMP	3:45.93	24	LMP	3:46.66
25	LMP	#31 Riley & Scott Europe	26	LMP	#32 Riley & Scott Europe
25	LMP	Riley & Scott Mk3	26	LMP	Riley & Scott Mk3
25	LMP	3:47.68	26	LMP	3:48.39
27	**LM-GTS**	**#51 Viper Team ORECA**	28	LM-GTS	#52 Viper Team ORECA
27	**LM-GTS**	Chrysler Viper GTS-R	28	LM-GTS	Chrysler Viper GTS-R
27	**LM-GTS**	3:56.59	28	LM-GTS	3:57.11
29	LM-GTS	#55 Paul Belmondo Racing	30	LM-GTS	#53 Viper Team ORECA
29	LM-GTS	Chrysler Viper GTS-R	30	LM-GTS	Chrysler Viper GTS-R
29	LM-GTS	3:59.19	30	LM-GTS	4:00.87
31	LM-GTS	#56 Chamberlain Engineering	32	LM-GTS	#65 Chéreau Sports
31	LM-GTS	Chrysler Viper GTS-R	32	LM-GTS	Porsche 993 GT2
31	LM-GTS	4:00.98	32	LM-GTS	4:03.50
33	LM-GTS	#67 Larbre Compétition	34	LM-GTS	#57 Chamberlain Engineering
33	LM-GTS	Porsche 993 GT2	34	LM-GTS	Chrysler Viper GTS-R
33	LM-GTS	4:04.40	34	LM-GTS	4:05.05
35	LM-GTS	#64 Konrad Motorsport	36	LM-GTS	#50 CICA Team ORECA
35	LM-GTS	Porsche 993 GT2	36	LM-GTS	Chrysler Viper GTS-R
35	LM-GTS	4:05.29	36	LM-GTS	4:05.83
37	LM-GTS	#61 Freisinger Motorsport	38	LM-GTS	#54 Paul Belmondo Racing
37	LM-GTS	Porsche 993 GT2	38	LM-GTS	Chrysler Viper GTS-R
37	LM-GTS	4:05.87	38	LM-GTS	4:06.78
39	LM-GTS	#63 Roock Racing Team	40	LM-GTS	#62 Roock Racing Team
39	LM-GTS	Porsche 993 GT2	40	LM-GTS	Porsche 993 GT2
39	LM-GTS	4:06.83	40	LM-GTS	4:07.71
41	LM-GTS	#66 Estoril Racing	42	**LM-GT**	**#81 Manthey Racing**
41	LM-GTS	Porsche 993 GT2	42	**LM-GT**	Porsche 996 GT3
41	LM-GTS	4:09.71	42	**LM-GT**	4:11.05
43	LM-GT	#80 Champion Racing	44	LM-GTS	#60 Freisinger Motorsport
43	LM-GT	Porsche 996 GT3	44	LM-GTS	Porsche 911 RSR
43	LM-GT	4:13.65	44	LM-GTS	4:15.79
45	LM-GT	#84 Perspective Racing	46		
45	LM-GT	Porsche 993 Carrera RSR	46		
45	LM-GT	4:27.66	46		

== Race ==
=== Morning warm-up ===
The morning warm-up continued the action from earlier in the week. The #4 Mercedes had received minor aero and suspension adjustments to improve stability. Yet it was the unlucky Webber again at the wheel on his out-lap, when the car again lifted its nose – this time at the bosse, the last hump approaching the hard braking area for the Mulsanne corner. Somersaulting yet again, it landed on its tail and slid on its roof all the way down to the Mulsanne escape-road. Webber emerged shocked and bruised from his seatbelts. There was obviously something fundamentally at issue with the cars, as all had been seen "porpoising" on the straights. After consulting with the engineers, managers and drivers, the team decided to carry, which in turn drew a notable amount of consternation and criticism. It was felt there were alarming call-backs to the 1955 Le Mans disaster when another Mercedes-Benz had got airborne and gone into the crowd. Small diveplane winglets, part of their standard wet-weather set-up, were hastily add to the nose-sections of the two remaining cars to increase downforce. Meanwhile, the works BMW team had realised during practice that their headlights were mounted too low to be much use at high speed. They installed a single light on the bonnet to improve nighttime visibility. The Autoexe team also did a last-minute change, swapping the fuel tank.

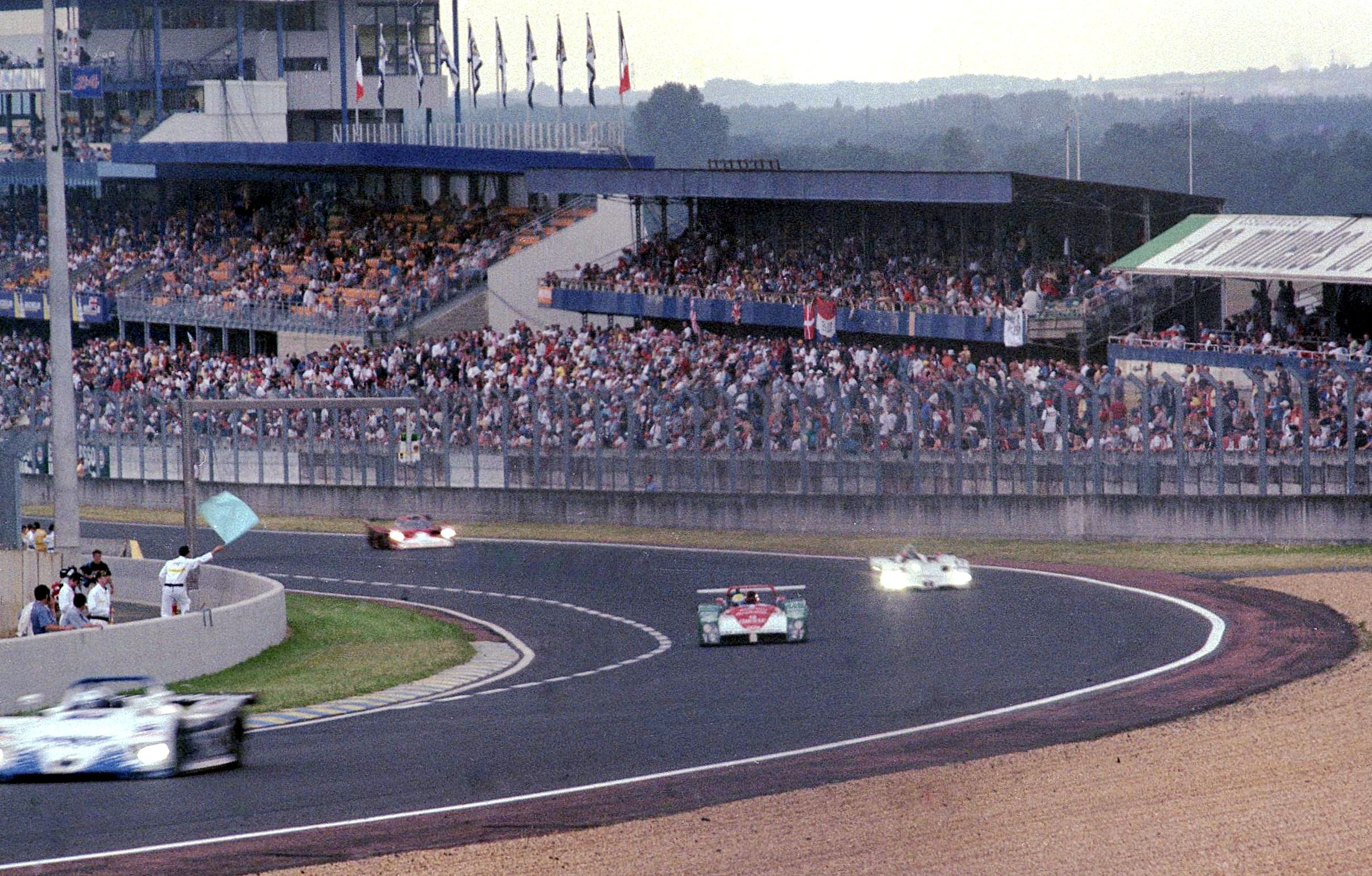
BMWs and Toyota lapping the solitary Ferrari going into the Dunlop Curve

=== Start of the race ===
The day itself was sunny and warm and a huge crowd of 180,000 were on hand to see a rather disorganised start, with the field all strung out. Brundle quickly seized the initiative and pulled out a gap – his first flying lap setting a new record of 3:37.3. Going into the Dunlop Chicane for the first time, the O'Connell Panoz punted the Goh privateer BMW off the track which ended up compromising both cars with a lap lost. Dumbreck quickly jumped from 7th to fourth and in the first quarter-hour it was the two Toyotas ahead of the two Mercedes with Beretta's Panoz, Dalmas' BMW and the Japanese-driven Toyota all close behind.

Only 20 minutes into the race, Wallace bought his Audi GTP into the pits for a new gearbox. He had lost 2nd gear on the opening lap, then more gears during the stint. The stop cost them 45 minutes, 13 laps, and dropped them to the back of the field. Brundle led to the first pit-stops, but he was blocked getting into the pits and, with a slicker stop by the Mercedes team, he was left down in third. It was quickly apparent the BMWs had exceptional fuel economy, going 14 laps on their first shift, 1-2 laps more than the other LMPs and GTPs. The Toyotas were also suffering little niggles that cancelled their speed advantage – no fuel coming down the hose of #1, a change of steering wheel for #2. Light rain that came across the track after two never amounted to anything and soon passed on.

In the evening, after four hours, there were still four cars on the lead lap: BMW, Toyota, Toyota, Mercedes. The first to fall, at 8.30pm, was the #1 Toyota: Sospiri drove the car into the garage. A power-steering fluid leak had got into the gearbox, and the gear cluster needed replacing, taking 25 minutes. They resumed 9 laps down and without power-steering. For a few laps all three Toyotas were in the pits together, with issues or having their fuel stops. Earlier, Aïello had pitted the leading Audi running 8th, and spent 10 minutes behind closed doors in the garage. Unbeknownst to the other teams, the team had done a complete gearbox change.

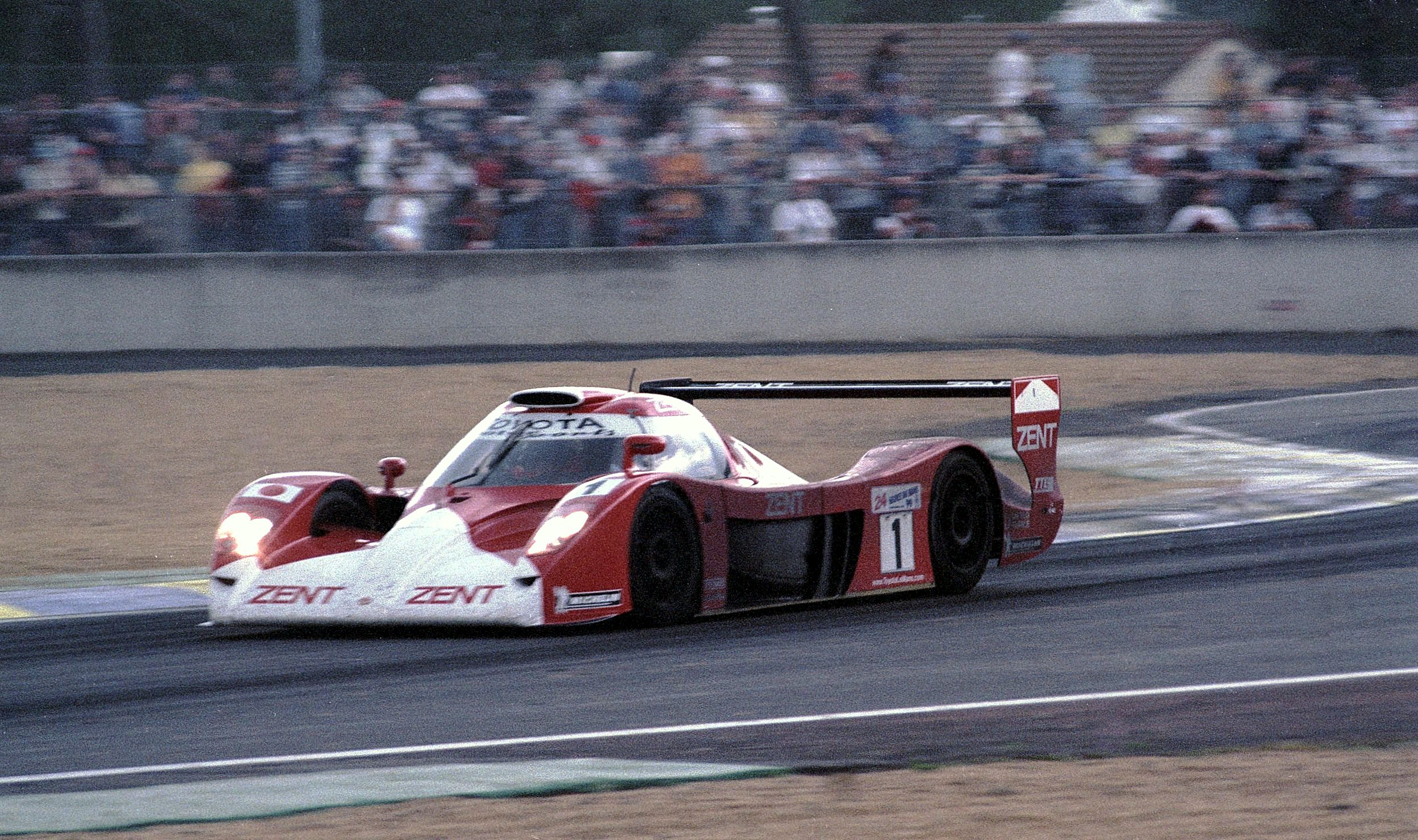
Brundle exiting the Dunlop Chicane in his Toyota GT-One

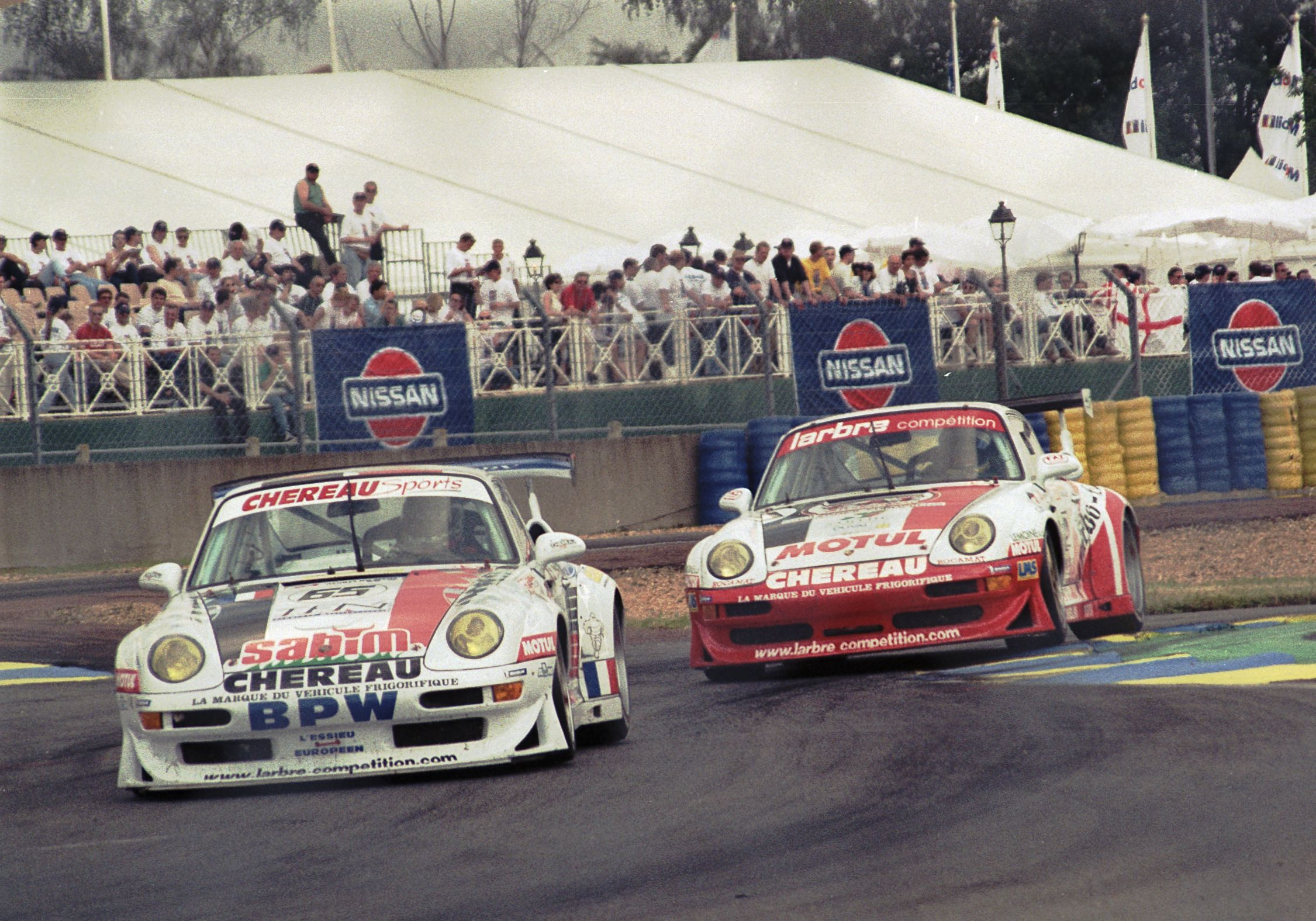
The Larbre Porsches at the Ford Chicane

A strong shift by Bouchut had picked up the Mercedes challenge where his teammate, Schneider, had left off, getting up to third. At 8.45pm on lap 75 Peter Dumbreck was on the fifth lap of his next stint in the #5 Mercedes. He was following Brundle on the very fast straight heading to Indianapolis when he suffered the same problem as Webber had in practice, in almost the same location. However, this time the accident was far more alarming and broadcast on live television. Coming over a crest, the car got airborne, somersaulting three times almost to treetop height and hurtled over 60 metres into the fir trees lining the track. By incredible good fortune, the car missed a marshal's post and only brushed the trees, to land on its wheels in a clearing of open ground (where trees had only been felled a fortnight earlier). Initially knocked unconscious, Dumbreck was able to get out of the car and wait beside the wreck until the emergency services arrived. Reminiscent of Jo Bonnier's fatal crash at the same location in the 1972 race. It was a testament to the strength and structural integrity of the Mercedes that none of their violent accidents broke the monocoque nor the fuel cell, fully protecting the driver. Now very mindful of the 1955 disaster, the Mercedes team immediately called in the second-placed car that same lap and withdrew it.

Despite the seriousness of the crash, it was well away from the track and the race continued, albeit behind the safety car. The lead was now a contest between McNish in the Toyota and Kristensen in the BMW (who moved the lap record down to 3:35.9 at dusk). The undeniable speed of the Toyota was compromised by often stalling on leaving its pitstops due to overheating fuel injectors. While the BMWs had better fuel economy, going longer each stint. The cars stayed in contact, on the same lap, all through the evening an into the night. In the GT classes, over the first half of the race the ORECA Vipers ran like clockwork, 1-2-3 in class. The leading Freisinger and Larbre Porsches were the only ones able to keep up, but after four hours they were already two laps behind.

=== Night ===
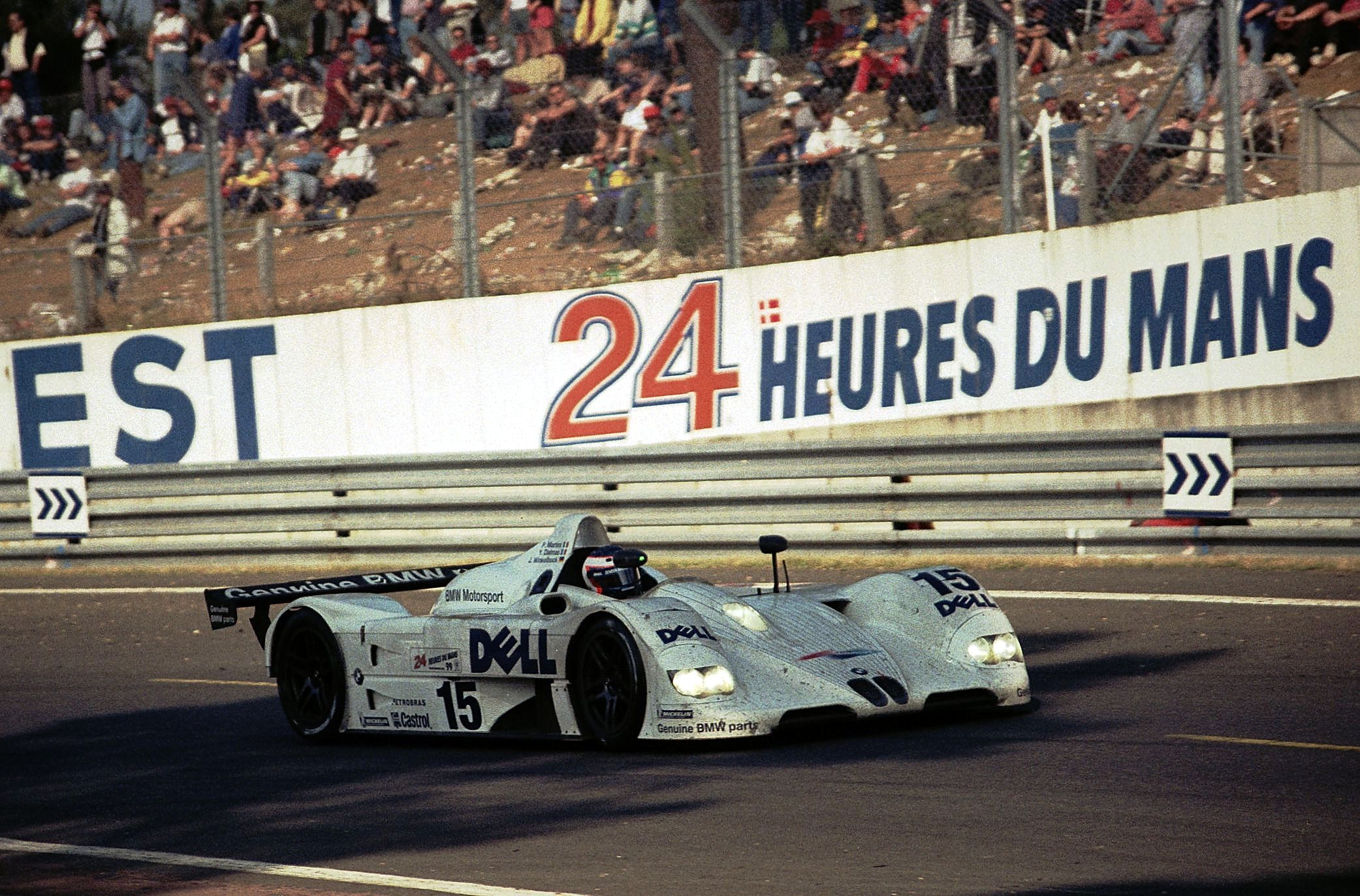
The winning BMW#15 showing its extra, centreline headlight

The new Nissan R391 had been having a promising run, running 3:40 laps to the leaders 3:38s. They got as high as 4th overall at dusk, as the Audis and Panoz had issues. However, after 11pm Motoyama had to park the car in the Porsche Curves with a head-gasket failure. Just before midnight, Brundle (now 10 laps behind) ran over debris on the track and then had a puncture. It sent him off at the first chicane on the back straight. The car instantly swapped ends and went back-first into the Armco. With both rear tyres now lost, the gearbox dragged on the ground and ruptured, and Brundle had to park it before reaching the pits. At midnight itself, after 8 hours, the leading BMW and Toyota had both done 123 laps, while their second cars were running two laps back along with the Pirro/Biela/Theys Audi. McNish had just set a new lap record in his attempt to catch the BMW leader. Sixth and seventh were the NISMO Courage and the Brabham Panoz (both 120) while the Bscher BMW was 8th (119). Just after 1am, the Panoz transmission overheated needing a gearbox change. The ORECA Vipers were controlling the GTS class, running 15th-17th overall with the Freisinger Porsche and the Manthey GT following, all a lap apart from each other. However, just at halftime, the Freisinger Porsche broke its driveshaft, costing them 6 laps. Their race came to an end at dawn with an engine failure. Approaching the halfway point, at 3.10am Boutsen was charging to make up his 3-lap deficit. When starting a new lap, he made a lunge to overtake a GT2 at the Dunlop curve before braking hard at the chicane. The Estoril Porsche, being heavier and not having the same stopping ability rammed the back of the Toyota spearing it airborne into the barriers. Trapped in his car for half an hour, Boutsen was seriously injured, suffering several broken vertebrae and was airlifted to hospital. The Porsche limped round the circuit back to the pits leaving a long oil trail. It took 20 minutes to extricate Boutsen then another hour to clean the track and repair the barrier. The field fell in behind a safety car and the race only went green again as dawn was breaking.

=== Morning ===
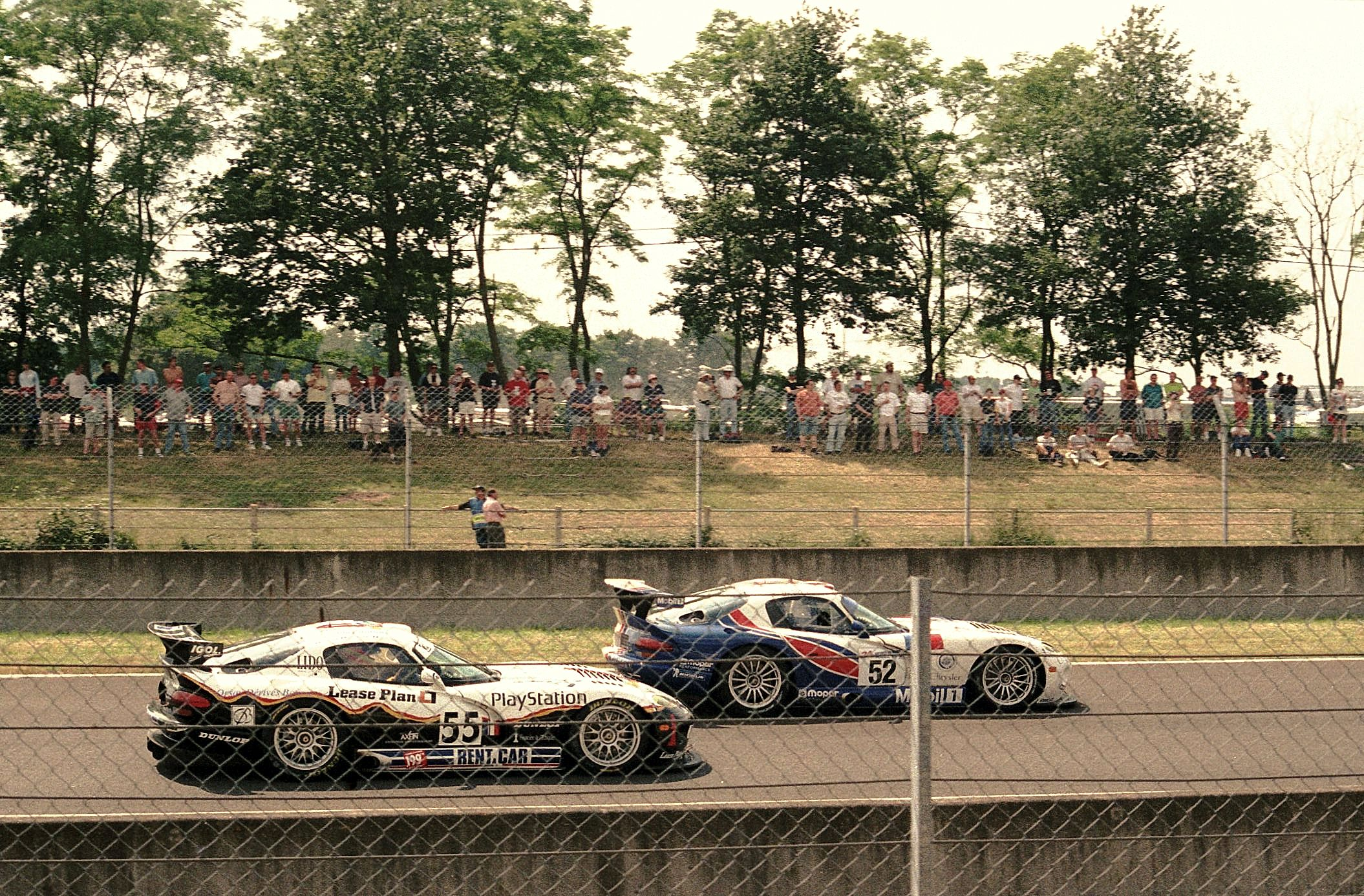
Pair of Vipers, ORECA leading Belmondo Racing

At this time, the Lehto/Kristensen/Müller car held a 3-lap lead over their teammates. The third, and final, Toyota was a further lap back. Running a conservative pace, they had lost two of those laps by stopping longer to replace tyres at every stop, when the others had been double-shifting theirs. At 6.30am, just as the Wallace Audi resumed Alboreto pitted his Audi spyder out of 6th for another gearbox change. It then lost 30 minutes an hour later with electrical problems, dropping them to 9th.

Come the new day, the Dumbreck accident was across the front of all the papers. In GTS all of the Vipers were still running, with 7 up in the top 8 places. The only interloper was the Konrad Porsche 11 laps behind the ORECA leader. The Beretta and Bell cars had been running very close throughout the race, often swapping the class-lead. It was finally resolved mid-morning when Tommy Archer had an off-track excursion that necessitated a 35-minute gearbox change that cost them 9 laps. The best of the Porsches was Franz Conrad's car running 18th, but at breakfast time a puncture threw Kitchak into the Armco at Tertre Rouge bending the suspension. Just five minutes later, Clérico had his right-rear wheel come adrift as the Belmondo Viper left the pits. He vainly tried to lift the car on his own to replace the wheel without success before inching back to the pits slowly on three wheels. Losing 8 laps, they eventually finished fourth in class. When Winkelhock spun his BMW at 8.30pm on his in-lap, it allowed Katayama to get onto the same lap.

Mid-morning, Perry McCarthy came to a halt on the Hunaudières straight. The Audi's third gearbox had broken and this time they could not get back to the pits. The coupés had proving problematic, and their teammates had already fallen the evening before when Abt stopped at Tertre Rouge with a broken differential. The lead Panoz had roared back up to sixth at the end of the morning when its second gearbox broke after 10 hours, dropping them back down to 9th. The sister-car had lost two hours overnight while an oil leak was found and rectified. Costing over 30 laps and 20 places, they drove back through the field to eventually finish 11th. The teams from the SRWC were never very competitive, with none of the Lolas, Riley & Scotts or lone Ferrari finishing. The Kremer Lola got up to tenth in the middle of the night before the gearbox collapsed, but that was as close as any got, and all the cars were back in their garages by mid-morning after terminal mechanical problems.

Approaching midday, Lehto now had a comfortable 4-lap lead. Without warning, the right-front suspension collapsed which, in turn, led to the throttle jamming open going into the Porsche Curves. The BMW smashed into the wall and out of the race. Lehto received a concussion and a gashed knee and had to be assisted from the car by the marshals. This left the BMW of Dalmas and Toyota driven by Suzuki barely 2 minutes apart, on the same lap, although it still took a quarter-hour for the #15 to overtake the #17 BMW on distance covered.

=== Finish and post-race ===
With four hours to go, the Bscher BMW had to pit for a clutch replacement, taking 45 minutes but emerging less than half a minute behind the second Audi. In the Toyota, the Japanese drivers were flying, at times lapping 6–8 seconds faster than most of the field and thrilling the crowd, setting up for an exciting finish. Going through the afternoon, Martini and Katayama were now both driving extremely fast, breaking McNish's 3:35.6 lap record from the night before. With the day clouding over and cooling, what were low-3:39 laps now became low 3:36s, with Katayama recording a fastest of 3:35.0. With an hour to go, and one stop left each; Dalmas has taken over from Martini for the run to the finish. The gap was down to 80 seconds, and Katayama was closing at 2–3 seconds per lap. Coming up quickly behind Bscher's repaired BMW at the first chicane Katayama was baulked, pulled out of an overtake and took the kerb. That soon caused a puncture later in the lap, at speed approaching Indianapolis and Katayama showed great skill to keep the car on the track. Crawling slowly back to the pits, the repairs cost four minutes and the chase was over. Dalmas was able to ease off and took the chequered flag to win by a lap, able to run his last circuit at a sedate 4:20.

Third and fourth were the Audi spyders. While Biela/Pirro/Theys had been trouble-free, it was the second car that had all the problems, including three gearbox changes. Despite finishing 14 laps back, the Audi management were extremely satisfied with the cars' performance. The Bscher privateer BMW came home fifth, a lap behind the second Audi. Steve Soper had driven the maximum 14 hours that had kept them with an outside chance of a podium place. The two Courage C52s were on schedule to finish 6th and 7th, although the NISMO car was losing ground. It was stymied with 70 minutes to go when Cottaz was squeezed off the track and the repairs cost it a position, with that 7th place going to the recovering Panoz and its temperamental gearbox. The two American cars finished in formation, with the ACO pit-crew prize going to the #12 team.

In an overwhelming display in GTS, the top six positions were all taken by the Chrysler Vipers, led home by consecutive 1–2 victory for the ORECA team. The Beretta/Wendlinger/Dupuy had a virtually faultless race, leading the class from start to finish, winning with a 7-lap margin. The only Viper to fail was the third ORECA car that had stranded Donohue on-track with a broken engine. It was the better of the Chamberlain cars that moved up to finish third in class. The Manthey Porsche easily won the GT class, by 25 laps, finishing credibly, in the middle of the Vipers and 13th overall. The GTS Porsches were all afflicted with major issues. The best of them was Franz Konrad's car, that finished 18th overall, 32 laps behind the Beretta Viper, and 24 laps behind the Manthey GT3 Porsche.

This was the fourth victory for Dalmas, in a remarkable run of consistency from 8 starts, putting him among the Le Mans elite. His was also unique in that he had won with four different manufacturers. This victory was down to excellent reliability from the team, spending only 33 minutes in the pits over the 24 hours. Collard and Sospiri retained their SRWC Drivers' Championship with Ferrari winning 5 rounds and the DAMS Lola B98/10 the other four. In the Petit Le Mans, the Panoz of Brabham/Bernard/Wallace beat two works BMWs. In the FIA GT Championship, the Vipers won all 10 rounds, all but one by the ORECA team and Bretta/Wendlinger won the Drivers' Championship.

Following Le Mans, Henri Pescarolo announced his retirement. An icon of French motorsport, he had competed 33 times, a Le Mans record and had four victories to his name, including a consecutive triple with Matra Sport (1972–74) and in 1984 with Klaus Ludwig in a Joest Racing Porsche. It was also the final race for Thierry Boutsen who, from his hospital bed, decided to retire after his serious accident. This was also the end of the road for Toyota, BMW and Mercedes-Benz, who now turned their attentions to Formula 1, while financial austerity at Nissan saw the shutdown of their prototype project. It was potentially a callback to the exodus at the start of the decade. However, the new teams of Audi and Panoz would take up the baton. In North America, sports car racing was in trouble with the split between rival series confirmed. The incumbent Road Racing Championship collapsed after 3 rounds but was reborn in 2000 as the Grand American Road Racing Championship, while the ACO continued to support Don Panoz's new American Le Mans Series.

== Official results ==
=== Finishers ===
Results taken from Quentin Spurring's book, officially licensed by the ACO
Class Winners are in Bold text.

Pos	Class	No.	Team	Drivers	Chassis	Engine	Tyre	Laps
1	**LMP-900**	**15**	**(Germany) Team BMW Motorsport** **(Germany) Schnitzer Motorsport**	**(Germany) Joachim Winkelhock** **(Italy) Pierluigi Martini** **(France) Yannick Dalmas**	BMW V12 LMR	BMW S70/3 6.0L V12	M	366
2	**LM-GTP**	**3**	**(Japan) Toyota Motorsport GmbH**	**(Japan) Toshio Suzuki** **(Japan) Ukyo Katayama** **(Japan) Keiichi Tsuchiya**	Toyota GT-One	Toyota R36V 3.6L V8 twin turbo	M	365
3	LMP-900	8	(Germany) Audi Sport Team Joest	(Italy) Emanuele Pirro (Germany) Frank Biela (Belgium) Didier Theys	Audi R8R	Audi 3.6L V8 twin turbo	M	361
4	LMP-900	7	(Germany) Audi Sport Team Joest	(Italy) Michele Alboreto (Italy) Rinaldo Capello (France) Laurent Aïello	Audi R8R	Audi 3.6L V8 twin turbo	M	347
5	LMP-900	18	(United Kingdom) David Price Racing (Germany) Bscher Racing (private entrant)	(Germany) Thomas Bscher (United Kingdom) Steve Soper (United States) Bill Auberlen	BMW V12 LM	BMW S70/3 6.0L V12	Y	346
6	LMP-900	13	(France) Courage Compétition	(Italy) Alex Caffi (Italy) Andrea Montermini (Italy) Domenico Schiattarella	Courage C52	Nissan VRH35L 3.5L V8 twin turbo	B	343
7	LMP-900	12	(United States) Panoz Motorsports	(Australia) David Brabham (France) Éric Bernard (United States) Butch Leitzinger	Panoz LMP-1 Roadster-S	Ford-Élan 6.0L V8	M	337
8	LMP-900	21	(Japan) NISMO (France) Courage Compétition	(France) Didier Cottaz (Belgium) Marc Goossens (Sweden) Fredrik Ekblom	Courage C52	Nissan VRH35L 3.5L V8 twin turbo	B	335
9	LMP-900	14	(France) La Filière Elf (France) Pescarolo Promotion Racing	(France) Henri Pescarolo (France) Michel Ferté (France) Patrice Gay	Courage C50	Porsche 935/76 3.0L F6 twin turbo	P	328
10	**LM-GTS** *	**51**	**(France) Viper Team ORECA**	**(Monaco) Olivier Beretta** **(Austria) Karl Wendlinger** **(France) Dominique Dupuy**	Chrysler Viper GTS-R	Chrysler 356-T6 8.0L V10	M	326
11	LM-P900	11	(United States) Panoz Motorsports	(United States) Johnny O'Connell (Denmark) Jan Magnussen (Italy) Max Angelelli	Panoz LMP-1 Roadster-S	Ford-Élan 6.0L V8	M	324
12	LM-GTS *	52	(France) Viper Team ORECA	(United Kingdom) Justin Bell (United States) Tommy Archer (Belgium) Marc Duez	Chrysler Viper GTS-R	Chrysler 356-T6 8.0L V10	M	319
13	**LM-GT**	**81**	**(Germany) Manthey Racing**	**(Germany) Uwe Alzen** **(Netherlands) Patrick Huisman** **(Italy) Luca Riccitelli**	Porsche 996 GT3	Porsche M96/77 3.6L F6	P	318
14	LM-GTS	56	(United Kingdom) Chamberlain Engineering	(Portugal) Ni Amorim (Netherlands) Hans Hugenholtz Jr (Switzerland) Toni Seiler	Chrysler Viper GTS-R	Chrysler 356-T6 8.0L V10	M	315
15	LM-GTS	50	(France) CICA Team ORECA	(Portugal) Manuel Mello-Breyner (Portugal) Pedro Mello-Breyner (Portugal) Tomas Mello-Breyner	Chrysler Viper GTS-R	Chrysler 356-T6 8.0L V10	M	313
16	LM-GTS	55	(France) Paul Belmondo Racing (private entrant)	(France) Emmanuel Clérico (France) Jean-Claude Lagniez (France) Guy Martinolle	Chrysler Viper GTS-R	Chrysler 356-T6 8.0L V10	D	310
17	LM-GTS	54	(France) Paul Belmondo Racing (private entrant)	(France) Paul Belmondo (Portugal) Tiago Monteiro (France) Marc Rostan	Chrysler Viper GTS-R	Chrysler 356-T6 8.0L V10	D	300
18	LM-GTS	64	(Germany) Konrad Motorsport	(Austria) Franz Konrad (United States) Peter Kitchak (United States) Charles Slater	Porsche 993 GT2	Porsche M64/81 3.7L F6 twin turbo	D	294
19	LM-GT *	80	(United States) Champion Racing	(France) Bob Wollek (Germany) Dirk Müller (Germany) Bernd Mayländer	Porsche 996 GT3	Porsche M96/77 3.6L F6	P	293
20	LM-GTS	62	(Germany) Roock Racing Team	(Germany) Claudia Hürtgen (Germany) André Ahrlé (Belgium) Vincent Vosse	Porsche 993 GT2	Porsche M64/81 3.7L F6 twin turbo	Y	291
21	LM-GT	84	(France) Perspective Racing (private entrant)	(France) Thierry Perrier (France) Jean-Louis Ricci (France) Michel Nourry	Porsche 993 Carrera RSR	Porsche M64/80 3.7L F6 twin turbo	P	289
22	LM-GTS	57	(United Kingdom) Chamberlain Engineering	(Brazil) Thomas Erdos (United Kingdom) Christian Vann (Germany) Christian Gläsel	Chrysler Viper GTS-R	Chrysler 356-T6 8.0L V10	M	271
N/C**	LM-GTS	65	(France) Chéreau Sports (France) Larbre Compétition	(France) Jean-Luc Chéreau (France) Patrice Goueslard (France) Pierre Yver	Porsche 993 GT2	Porsche M64/82 3.6L F6 twin turbo	M	240

=== Did not finish ===
Pos	Class	No	Team	Drivers	Chassis	Engine	Tyre	Laps	Reason
DNF	LMP-900	17	(Germany) Team BMW Motorsport (Germany) Schnitzer Motorsport	(Denmark) Tom Kristensen (Finland) JJ Lehto (Germany) Jörg Müller	BMW V12 LMR	BMW S70/3 6.0L V12	M	304	Accident (21hr)
DNF	LM-GTS	53	(France) Viper Team ORECA	(United States) David Donohue (France) Jean-Philippe Belloc (France) Soheil Ayari	Chrysler Viper GTS-R	Chrysler 356-T6 8.0L V10	M	271	Engine (22hr)
DNF	LM-GTS	63	(Germany) Roock Racing Team	(Germany) Hubert Haupt (United Kingdom) John Robinson (United Kingdom) Hugh Price	Porsche 993 GT2	Porsche M64/81 3.7L F6 twin turbo	Y	232	Engine / Fire (19hr)
DNF	LMP-900	19	(Japan) Team Goh (United Kingdom) David Price Racing	(Japan) Hiro Matsushita (Japan) Hiroki Katoh (Japan) Akihiko Nakaya	BMW V12 LM	BMW S70/3 6.0L V12	M	223	Gearbox (20hr)
DNF	LMP-900	26	(Germany) Konrad Motorsport (Netherlands) Racing for Holland (private entrant)	(Netherlands) Jan Lammers (Netherlands) Peter Kox (Netherlands) Tom Coronel	Lola B98/10	Ford-Roush 6.0L V8	D	213	Gearbox (24hr)
DNF	LM-GTP	10	(United Kingdom) Audi Sport UK	(United Kingdom) James Weaver (United Kingdom) Andy Wallace (United Kingdom) Perry McCarthy	Audi R8C	Audi 3.6L V8 twin turbo	M	198	Gearbox (18hr)
DNF	LM-GTP	2	(Japan) Toyota Motorsport GmbH	(United Kingdom) Allan McNish (Belgium) Thierry Boutsen (Germany) Ralf Kelleners	Toyota GT-One	Toyota R36V 3.6L V8 twin turbo	M	173	Accident (13hr)
DNF	LM-GTS	61	(Germany) Freisinger Motorsport	(Germany) Ernst Palmberger (Germany) Wolfgang Kaufmann (France) Michel Ligonnet	Porsche 993 GT2	Porsche M64/81 3.6L F6 twin turbo	D	157	Engine (14hr)
DNF	LMP-900	27	(Germany) Kremer Racing	(Spain) Tomás Saldaña (South Africa) Grant Orbell (Belgium) Didier de Radiguès	Lola B98/10	Ford-Roush 6.0L V8	G	146	Gearbox (16hr)
DNF	LM-GTS	67	(France) Larbre Compétition	(France) Jean-Pierre Jarier (France) Sébastien Bourdais (France) Pierre de Thoisy	Porsche 993 GT2	Porsche M64/82 3.6L F6 twin turbo	M	134	Engine (14hr)
DNF	LM-GTS	66	(France) Estoril Racing Communication (private entrant)	(France) Manuel Monteiro (France) Michel Monteiro (France) Michel Maisonneuve	Porsche 993 GT2	Porsche M64/81 3.6L F6 twin turbo	P	123	Accident (13hr)
DNF	LMP-900	22	(Japan) NISMO	(France) Érik Comas (Germany) Michael Krumm (Japan) Satoshi Motoyama	Nissan R391	Nissan VRH50A 5.0L V8	B	110	Engine (9hr)
DNF	LM-GTP	1	(Japan) Toyota Motorsport GmbH	(United Kingdom) Martin Brundle (France) Emmanuel Collard (Italy) Vincenzo Sospiri	Toyota GT-One	Toyota R36V 3.6L V8 twin turbo	M	90	Accident damage (9hr)
DNF	LMP-900	25	(France) DAMS	(France) Franck Montagny (France) Christophe Tinseau (France) David Terrien	Lola B98/10	Judd GV4 4.0L V10	P	77	Engine (7hr)
DNF	LM-GTP	6	(Germany) AMG Mercedes	(Germany) Bernd Schneider (France) Franck Lagorce (Portugal) Pedro Lamy	Mercedes-Benz CLR	Mercedes-Benz GT108C; 5.7L V8	B	76	Withdrawn
DNF	LM-GTP	5	(Germany) AMG Mercedes	(France) Christophe Bouchut (Germany) Nick Heidfeld (United Kingdom) Peter Dumbreck	Mercedes-Benz CLR	Mercedes-Benz GT108C; 5.7L V8	B	75	Accident (6hr)
DNF	LMP-900	24	(Japan) Autoexe Motorsports (private entrant)	(Japan) Yojiro Terada (France) Franck Fréon (United Kingdom) Robin Donovan	Riley & Scott/Autoexe LMP99	Ford 6.0L V8	Y	74	Engine (11hr)
DNF	LMP-900	29	(France) JB Racing (private entrant)	(Italy) Mauro Baldi (France) Jérôme Policand (Italy) Christian Pescatori	Ferrari 333 SP	Ferrari F310E 4.0L V12	P	71	Engine (7hr)
DNF	LMP-900	32	(France) Riley & Scott Europe	(Italy) Marco Apicella (Sweden) Carl Rosenblad (United States) Shane Lewis	Riley & Scott Mk III/2	Ford 6.0L V8	P	67	Engine (8hr)
DNF	LM-GTP	9	(United Kingdom) Audi Sport UK	(Sweden) Stefan Johansson (Monaco) Stéphane Ortelli (Germany) Christian Abt	Audi R8C	Audi 3.6L V8 twin turbo	M	55	Gearbox (5hr)
DNF	LMP-900	31	(France) Riley & Scott Europe	(France) Philippe Gache (South Africa) Gary Formato (France) Olivier Thévenin	Riley & Scott Mk III/2	Ford 6.0L V8	P	25	Engine (9hr)
DNF	LM-GTS *	60	(Germany) Freisinger Motorsport	(Australia) Raymond Lintott (Austria) Manfred Jurasz (Japan) Katsunori Iketani	Porsche 993 GT2	Porsche M64/81 3.6L F6 twin turbo	D	24	Accident (4hr)

- Note *: one of the "Automatic Entries" awarded by the ACO.
- Note **: Not Classified as did not cover sufficient distance (70% of their class-winner) by the race's end.

=== Did not start ===
Pos	Class	No	Team	Drivers	Chassis	Engine	Tyre	Reason
DNS	LM-GTP *	4	(Germany) AMG Mercedes	(France) Jean-Marc Gounon (Australia) Mark Webber (Germany) Marcel Tiemann	Mercedes-Benz CLR	Mercedes-Benz GT108C; 5.7L V8	**B**	Accident in warm-up
DNS	LMP-900	23	(Japan) NISMO	(Japan) Aguri Suzuki (Japan) Masami Kageyama (Belgium) Eric van de Poele	Nissan R391	Nissan VRH50A 5.0L V8	**B**	Accident in practice
DNS	LMGT	83	(United Kingdom) G. MacQuillan (private entrant)	(United Kingdom) Gerard MacQuillan (Belgium) Michel Neugarten (United States) Chris Gleason	Porsche 993 RSR	Porsche M64/80 3.7L F6 twin turbo	**Y**	Did not qualify
DNF	LMP-900	16	(Germany) Team BMW Motorsport (Germany) Schnitzer Motorsport		BMW V12 LMR	BMW S70/3 6.0L V12	**M**	Entry Withdrawn
DNF	LMP-900	30	(France) JB Racing (private entrant)		Ferrari 333 SP	Ferrari F310E 4.0L V12	**P**	Entry Withdrawn

=== Class winners ===
Class	Winning Car	Winning Drivers
LM-P	#15 BMW V12 LMR	Dalmas / Martini / Winkelhock
LM-GTP	#3 Toyota GT-One	Katayama / Suzuki / Tsuchiya
LM-GTS	#51 Chrysler Viper GTS-R	Beretta / Wendlinger / Dupuy
LM-GT	#81 Porsche 996 GT3	Alzen / Huisman / Riccitelli

== Statistics ==
Taken from Quentin Spurring's book, officially licensed by the ACO

- Pole Position – M. Brundle, #1 Toyota GT-One – 3:29.9; 233.3 km/h (145.0 mph)
- Fastest Lap – U. Katayama, #3 Toyota GT-One – 3:35.0; 227.8 km/h (141.5 mph)
- Winning Distance – 4,983.0 km (3,096.3 mi)
- Winner's Average Speed – 207.6 km/h (129.0 mph)
- Attendance - 160,000
