= Pierre Yver =

French racing driver

Pierre Yver (born 23 July 1947) is a French racing driver.

== Racing record ==
=== 24 Hours of Le Mans results ===
Year	Team	Co-Drivers	Car	Class	Laps	Pos.	Class Pos.
1978	(France) Pronuptia M.R.E.	(France) Michel Elkoubi (France) Philippe Streiff	Lola T296-Ford Cosworth	S 2.0	232	DNF	DNF
1979	(France) Lambretta S.A.F.D.	(Morocco) Max Cohen-Olivar (France) Michel Elkoubi	Lola T296-BMW	S 2.0	248	21st	3rd
1980	(France) Michel Elkoubi - Primagaz	(France) Patrick Perrier	Lola T296-BMW	S 2.0	255	DNF	DNF
1981	(France) Compagnie Primagaz	(France) Michel Dubois (France) Jacques Heuclin	Lola T296-BMW	S 2.0	203	NC	NC
1982	(France) Primagaz	(France) Bruno Sotty (France) Lucien Guitteny	Rondeau M379-Ford Cosworth	C	306	10th	5th
1983	(France) Primagaz	(France) Lucien Guitteny (Belgium) Bernard de Dryver	Rondeau M382-Ford Cosworth	C	266	DSQ	DSQ
1984	(France) Primagaz	(France) Pierre-François Rousselot (Belgium) Bernard de Dryver	Rondeau M382-Ford Cosworth	C1	155	DNF	DNF
1985	(France) Primagaz	(France) Pierre-François Rousselot (France) François Sérvanin	Rondeau M382-Ford Cosworth	C1	286	DNF	DNF
1986	(Germany) Porsche Kremer Racing	(France) Hubert Striebig (Morocco) Max Cohen-Olivar	Porsche 956	C1	160	DNF	DNF
1987	(France) Primagaz Competition	(Germany) Jürgen Lässig (Belgium) Bernard de Dryver	Porsche 962C	C1	335	2nd	2nd
1988	(France) Primagaz Competition	(Germany) Jürgen Lässig (United Kingdom) Dudley Wood	Porsche 962C	C1	356	11th	11th
1989	(Germany) Obermaier Racing/Primagaz	(Germany) Jürgen Lässig (France) Paul Belmondo	Porsche 962C	C1	61	DNF	DNF
1990	(Germany) Obermaier Racing	(Germany) Otto Altenbach (Germany) Jürgen Lässig	Porsche 962C	C1	341	9th	9th
1991	(Switzerland) Team Salamin Primagaz (Germany) Obermaier Racing	(Germany) Otto Altenbach (Germany) Jürgen Lässig	Porsche 962C	C2	232	DNF	DNF
1992	(Germany) Primagaz Obermaier	(Germany) Otto Altenbach (Germany) Jürgen Lässig	Porsche 962C	C3	297	10th	3rd
1993	(France) Courage Compétition	(France) Jean-Louis Ricci (France) Jean-François Yvon	Courage C30LM-Porsche	C2	343	11th	6th
1994	(France) Société Larbre Compétition	(France) Jean-Luc Chéreau (France) Jack Leconte	Porsche 911 Carrera RSR	GT2	62	DNF	DNF
1995	(France) Jean-Claude Miloe	(France) Jean-Luc Chéreau (France) Jack Leconte	Porsche 911 GT2 Evo	GT1	40	DNF	DNF
1996	(France) Société Chereau Sports	(France) Jean-Luc Chéreau (France) Jack Leconte	Porsche 911 GT2 Evo	GT1	279	22nd	13th
1997	(France) Société Viper Team Oréca	(United Kingdom) Justin Bell (United States) John Morton	Chrysler Viper GTS-R	GT2	278	14th	5th
1998	(France) Larbre Compétition	(France) Patrice Goueslard (France) Jean-Luc Chéreau	Porsche 911 GT2	GT2	240	23rd	9th
1999	(France) Ets. Chéreau	(France) Patrice Goueslard (France) Jean-Luc Chéreau	Porsche 911 GT2	GTS	240	NC	NC
