= Jean-Luc Chéreau =

French businessman and former racing driver

Jean-Luc Chéreau (born 25 August 1948) is a French businessman and son of the founder of Chereau trailers www.chereau.com, one of Europe's largest refrigerated trailer unit manufacturers. He is also a former amateur racing driver. providing sponsorship to Larbre Compétition's GT racing activities from 1994-2002 as well as driving.

== Racing record ==
=== 24 Hours of Le Mans results ===
Year	Team	Co-Drivers	Car	Class	Laps	Pos.	Class Pos.
1994	(France) Société Larbre Compétition	(France) Pierre Yver (France) Jack Leconte	Porsche 911 Carrera RSR	GT2	62	DNF	DNF
1995	(France) Jean-Claude Miloe	(France) Pierre Yver (France) Jack Leconte	Porsche 911 GT2 Evo	GT1	40	DNF	DNF
1996	(France) Société Chereau Sports	(France) Pierre Yver (France) Jack Leconte	Porsche 911 GT2 Evo	GT1	279	22nd	13th
1997	(France) Société Chéreau	(France) Jack Leconte (France) Jean-Pierre Jarier	Porsche 911 GT2	GT2	77	DNF	DNF
1998	(France) Larbre Compétition	(France) Patrice Goueslard (France) Pierre Yver	Porsche 911 GT2	GT2	240	23rd	9th
1999	(France) Ets. Chéreau	(France) Patrice Goueslard (France) Pierre Yver	Porsche 911 GT2	GTS	240	NC	NC
2000	(France) Larbre Compétition	(France) Christophe Bouchut (France) Patrice Goueslard	Porsche 911 GT3-R	GT	34	DNF	DNF
2001	(France) Larbre Compétition	(France) Patrice Goueslard (France) Sébastien Dumez	Porsche 911 GT3-RS	GT	274	10th	4th
2002	(France) Larbre Compétition	(Sweden) Carl Rosenblad (France) Jean-Claude Lagniez	Chrysler Viper GTS-R	GTS	278	25th	6th
