= Jack Leconte =

French racing driver

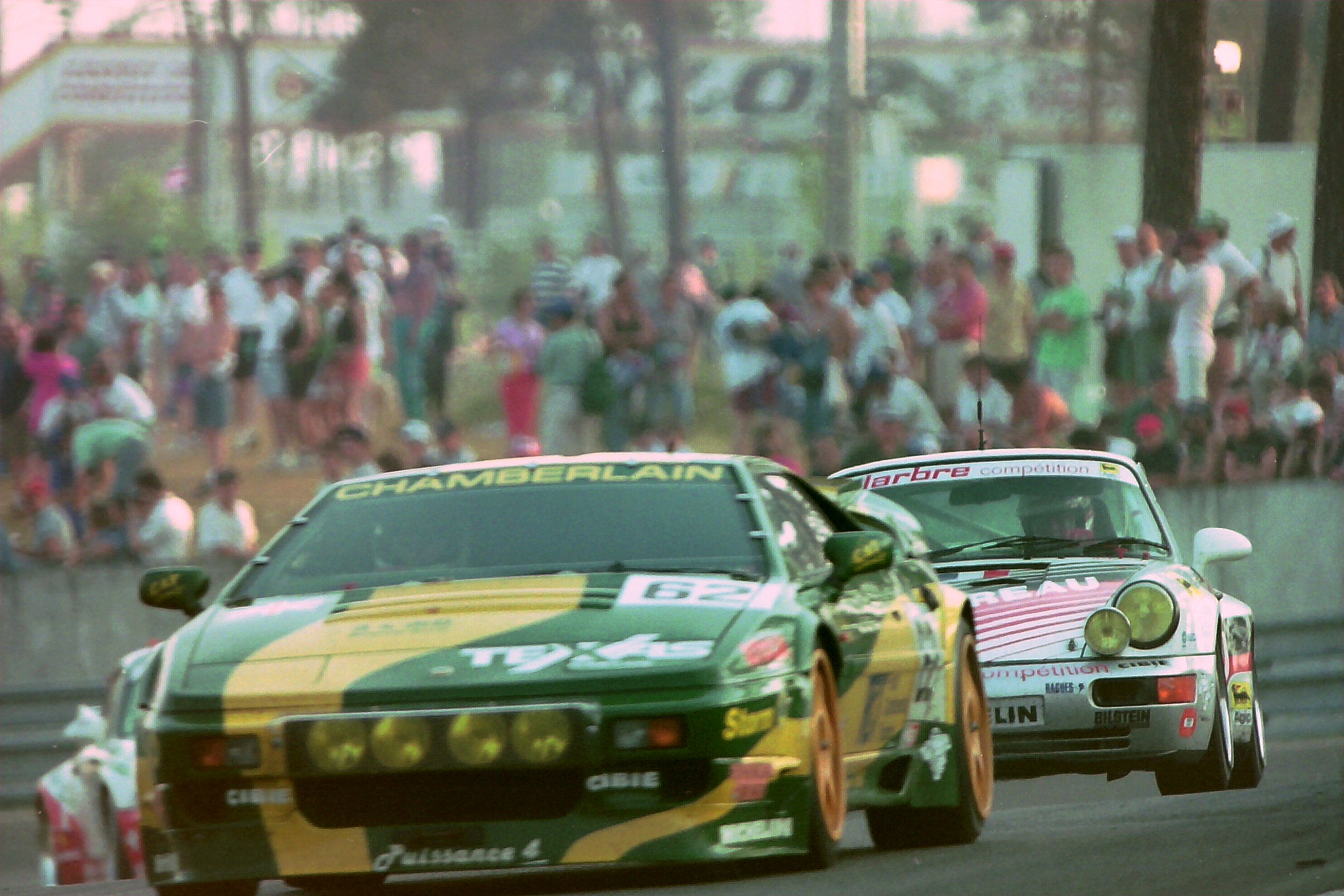
- Nationality: France
- Born: Jack Gil Marcel Fernánd Leconte; 19 November 1959 (age 66) Caen, France

Jack Gil Marcel Fernánd Leconte (born 19 November 1959) is a retired French racing driver.

== Racing record ==
=== 24 Hours of Le Mans results ===
Year	Team	Co-Drivers	Car	Class	Laps	Pos.	Class Pos.
1993	(France) Jack Leconte (France) Larbre Compétition	(France) Pierre de Thoisy (Spain) Jesús Pareja	Porsche 911 Carrera RSR	C4	301	16th	2nd
1994	(France) Jack Leconte (France) Larbre Compétition	(France) Pierre de Thoisy (France) Pierre Yver	Porsche 911 Carrera RSR	C4	301	16th	2nd
1995	(France) Société Larbre Compétition	(France) Jean-Luc Chéreau (France) Pierre Yver	Porsche 911 Carrera RSR	GT2	62	DNF	DNF
1996	(France) Société Chereau Sports	(France) Jean-Luc Chéreau (France) Pierre Yver	Porsche 911 GT2 Evo	GT1	279	22nd	13th
1997	(France) Société Chéreau	(France) Jean-Luc Chéreau (France) Jean-Pierre Jarier	Porsche 911 GT2	GT2	77	DNF	DNF
