= Sébastien Enjolras =

French racing driver

- Nationality: (France) French
- Born: Sébastien Olivier Enjolras; 4 April 1976; Seclin, France
- Died: 3 May 1997 (aged 21); Le Mans, France

24 Hours of Le Mans career
- Years: 1996–1997
- Teams: Welter Racing
- Best finish: N/A
- Class wins: 0

Sébastien Olivier Enjolras (4 April 1976 – 3 May 1997) was a French racing driver. Considered to be one of the most promising French drivers of his generation, he was killed in a crash during practice for the 1997 24 Hours of Le Mans race, aged 21.

== Career ==
Enjolras was born in Seclin. He was the son of Michel Enjolras, a preparer of rally cars, and the brother of Pascal, a rally driver. He began racing karts in 1989. In 1994, he moved up to formula racing, finishing third in the Formula Renault Campus championship. He moved to the senior domestic championship in 1995, finishing seventh in the championship. He stayed on for another year and won the title in 1996 for the La Filière team, ahead of future Formula One drivers Sébastien Bourdais and Franck Montagny. This performance was partially overshadowed when he failed a drug test at the end of the year, testing positive for cannabis. Although banned for six months, he was not stripped of his championship and returned to racing when it expired. For 1997, he moved up to the French Formula Three Championship with La Filière, and finished a posthumous thirteenth in the final standings.

Enjolras also tried sports car racing in 1996, when he drove one of the Welter Racing team's cars in the LMP2 class of the Le Mans 24 Hours alongside compatriots William David and Arnaud Trévisiol, the Peugeot-powered entry failing to finish. He returned with the team for 1997.

== Death ==
On a pre-qualifying run for the Le Mans 24 Hours a month before the race, the rear bodywork detached from Enjolras' car, causing it to become airborne and fly over the safety barriers after the Arnage corner. The car overturned and exploded at high speed, killing Enjolras instantly. Welter withdrew Enjolras' and its other entries, and single-piece bodywork was subsequently banned. He was the first driver fatality at the event since Jo Gartner in 1986, and remained the most recent driver to die until Allan Simonsen's fatal crash in 2013.

The scene of Enjolras' crash is currently denoted by a memorial stone behind the Armco barriers.

== Racing record ==
=== Racing career summary ===
Season	Series	Team name	Races	Poles	Wins	Points	Final Placing
1994	Formula Renault Campus France	?	?	?	1	233	3rd
1995	Championnat de France Formula Renault 2.0	?	?	?	1	?	7th
1996	Championnat de France Formula Renault 2.0	La Filière	16	?	9	201	1st
1996	Le Mans 24 Hours	Welter Racing (LMP2)	1	0	0	N/A	NC
1997	French Formula Three	La Filière	6	0	0	13	13th
1997	Le Mans 24 Hours	Welter Racing (LMP2)	0	0	0	N/A	DNQ

== See also ==
- List of 24 Hours of Le Mans fatal accidents

== Sources ==
- "Sébastien Enjolras". motorsportmemorial.org.
- "The racing career of Sébastien Enjolras — in detail". driverdb.com.
- "Bombing the backwaters, road kill and the law of Evin". grandprix.com. 2000-07-01. Archived from the original on 2008-10-04.

Sporting positions
Preceded by Cyrille Sauvage	Championnat de France Formule Renault Champion; 1996	Succeeded by Jonathan Cochet
