= 1997 24 Hours of Le Mans =

65th 24 Hours of Le Mans endurance race

Previous: 1996	Next: 1998
Index: Races | Winners

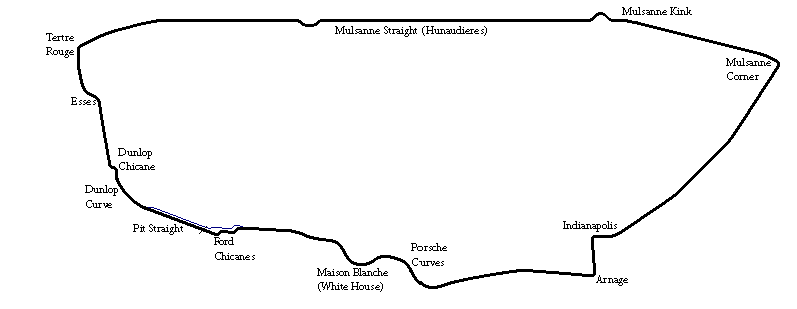
Le Mans in 1997

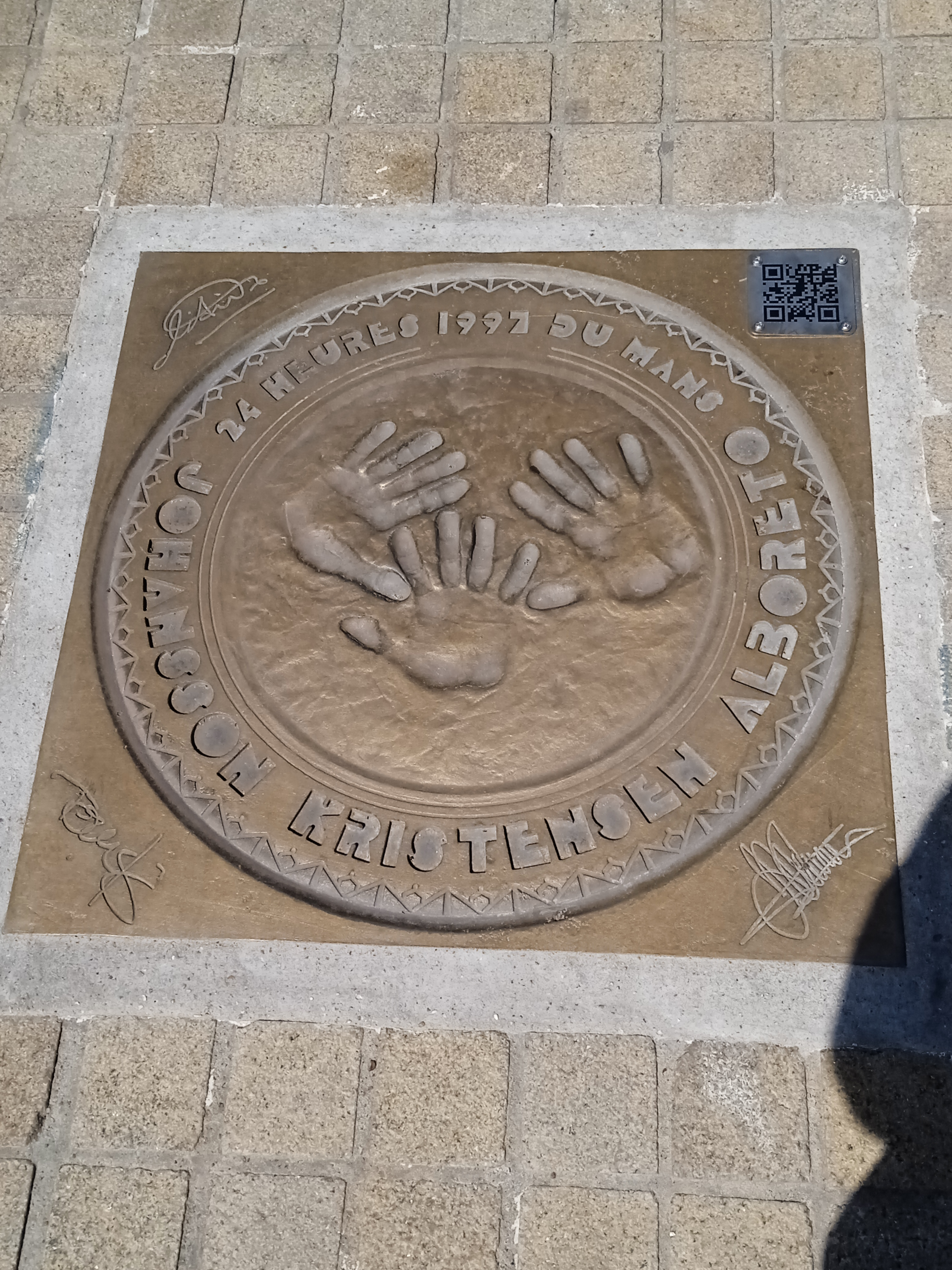
1997 victors' plaque on the Walk of Fame

The 1997 24 Hours of Le Mans was the 65th Grand Prix of Endurance and took place on 14 and 15 June 1997. It was won by Michele Alboreto, Stefan Johansson, and Tom Kristensen, driving a TWR-Porsche WSC-95. The race was the first of a record 9 Le Mans wins for Kristensen, on what was his La Sarthe debut. This was only the third time in the races history that it was won by the same car and same chassis as the previous year, and in a unique ‘double-double’ one of those other times (1984–85) was also by Joest Racing.

Once again, it was at the expense of the works Porsche team who had dominated most of the race. But when the second team car stopped in flames with just two hours to go, it was the Joest team who had the fortune to be in the right place to pick up the pieces. New GT1 cars arrived from Nissan and the small new American Panoz company. Initially, the TWR held the lead for the first two hours, until the two works Porsches asserted their dominance and led into and through the night, with the TWR and the best of the McLarens gradually giving away ground. Come the new dawn though and the Porsche challenge faltered. Bob Wollek, hounded by his teammate, hit a curb and wrecked the suspension on their leading car. The other car took over and was looking comfortably at the front until, with two hours to go, Ralf Kelleners radioed the team to report an engine issue and then had to almost immediately pull over as the car burst into flames. From there, the TWR-Porsche moved up to the lead which it held to the finish, with the Gulf and works BMW McLarens coming home in second and third. The GT2 class was a battle between the Chrysler Vipers and Porsche 911s but in a race of attrition which, in the end, fell to the Haberthur Porsche team.

== Regulations ==
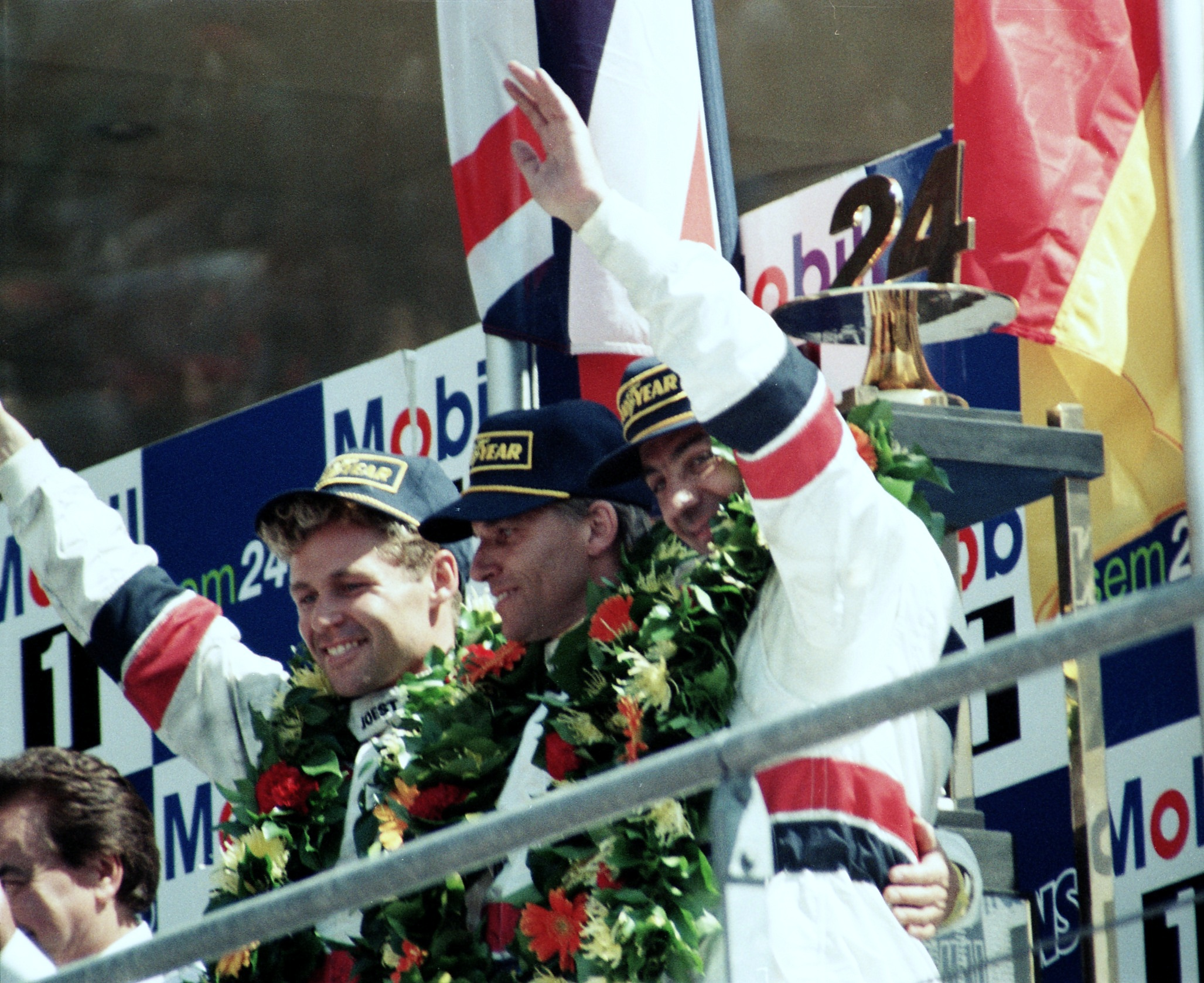
The winning drivers – Kristensen, Johansson, Alboreto

The circuit was adjusted very slightly, at the request of the FIM (Fédération Internationale de Motocyclisme) – the governing body for motorcycle racing – to modify the chicane after the Dunlop Bridge and increase the run-off area for improved safety, as part of the Bugatti Circuit used in motorcycling events. This extended the lap length by 5 metres. The Automobile Club de l'Ouest (ACO) made no notable changes this year to their technical specifications. They did decree that Prototype and GT1 cars would have white headlights, while the GT2s had yellow ones to aid in nighttime identification. GT2 cars were also now allowed carbon brakes if their base road car was fitted with them. The list of automatic entries was changed from an arbitrary choice of manufacturers to nominated class-victories of specific races.

The success of the BPR Global GT Series convinced the FIA to promote it to full World Championship status, and 1997 was the inaugural year of the FIA GT Championship. Organisation stayed with the Stéphane Ratel Organisation, with this year to consist of 8 races in Europe, 1 in Japan and the final 2 rounds in the USA. Alongside that, a new embryonic prototype series was set up. The 1997 International Sports Racing Series was a non-championship event of 4 races in Europe that would commence after the Le Mans 24 Hours.

Once again, the ACO lined up the first ten cars of each class behind each other, with prototypes on the left and GT cars on the right.

== Entries ==
The ongoing strength of the GT championships meant there were 86 applications, of which 76 were accepted for the Pre-Qualifying weekend in May for the 46 starting spots. From those who turned up, there were 13 prototypes for 10 places, 29 GT1s for 22 and 21 GT2s for 16 slots. The ACO only gave automatic entry to a further 6 cars this year, as follows:

- 1996 Le Mans 24hr Prototype class-winner (Joest Racing)
- 1996 Le Mans 24hr GT1 class-winner (Porsche AG)
- 1996 Le Mans 24hr GT2 class-winner (Roock Racing)
- 1996 Coupe d’Automne 4hr Prototype class-winner (Welter Racing)
- 1996 Coupe d’Automne 4hr GT1 class-winner (Larbre Compétition)
- 1996 BPR Global GT Series winner (Gulf Racing)

Fully half the cars coming from the Pre-Qualifying could be called works entries, and there were ten different manufacturers in GT1:

Class	Quantity	Turbo and Rotary engines
LM-P875	13 / 10	11 / 8
LM-P650	2 / 0	2 / 0
LM-GT1	35 / 22	17 / 11
LM-GT2	26 / 16	13 / 8
Total Entries	76 / 48	43 / 27

- Note: The first number is the number that pre-qualified, the second the number who started.

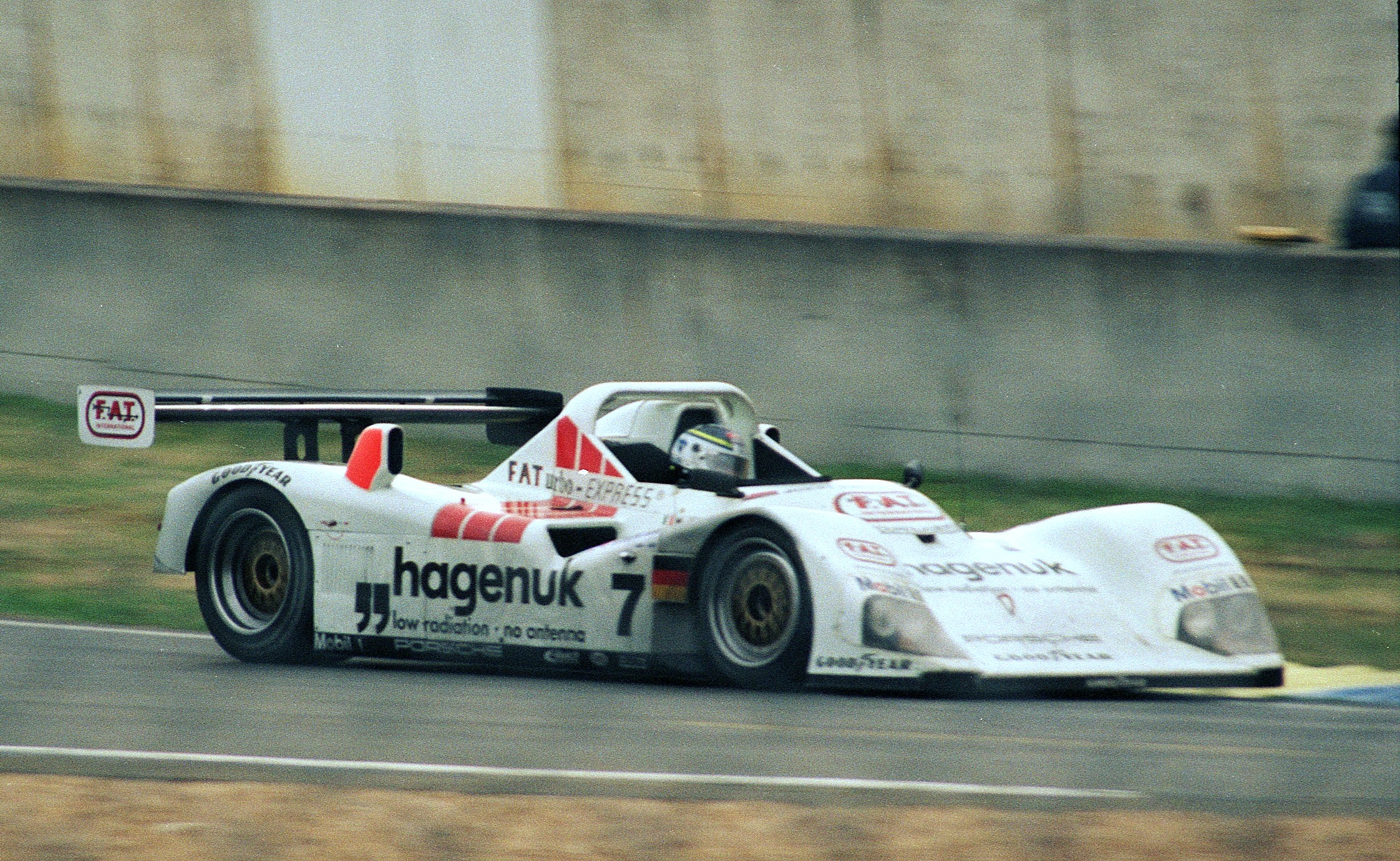
The 1996-winning TWR WSC-95 #7 in its new livery for 1997

=== LM-P875 ===
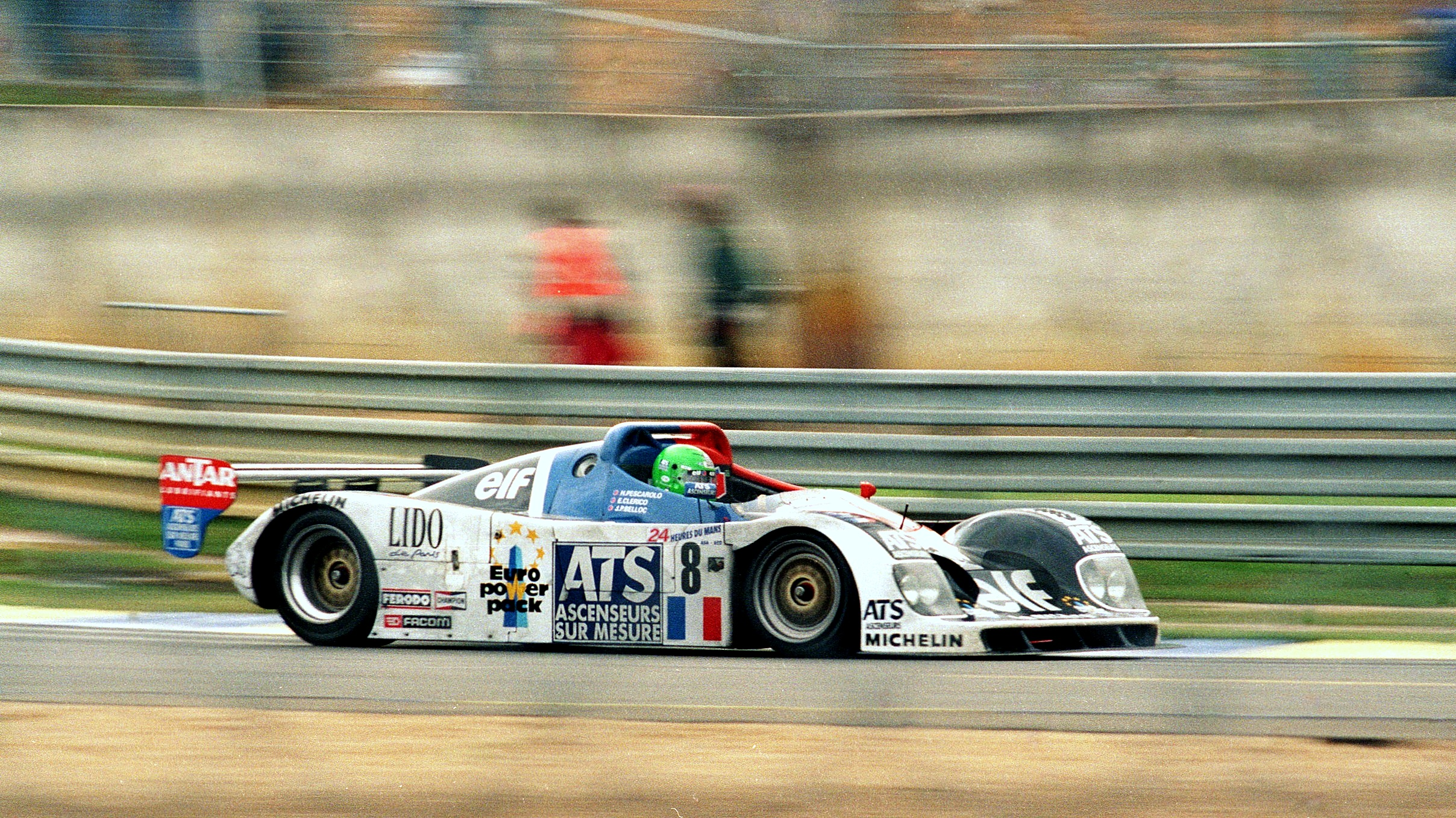
Pescarolo's distinctive green helmet in the Courage C36

Joest Racing returned with the victorious TWR-Porsche from last year. The second car had been returned to the Porsche factory. Neither had been raced since but Reinhold Joest availed himself of the automatic entry to defend their title, this time without the factory back-up. Very little extra work was done on the car. Michele Alboreto was now the lead driver and was reunited with his former F1 Ferrari teammate Stefan Johansson. Their rookie co-driver this year was Tom Kristensen, who was to become, over the next decade, Le Mans' most successful driver. At this time, he was leading the F3000 championship after 3 races. He was approached by Joest just nine days before the race, to replace an injured Davy Jones who had won for Joest in 1996, but was still unable to race after a single-seater accident in January.

Courage Compétition put together another big effort to try and get the overall win. Four cars were entered including the new C41, now adapted to the ACO prototype regulations. Celebrating the 40th anniversary of Michel Vaillant, the French motor-racing comic, the car was called the Courage-Vaillant and painted by the comic's publisher Studio Graton. It was entrusted to junior F3000 drivers Didier Cottaz, Marc Goossens and Jérôme Policand. The other three were their C36 spyders, with one again driven by Mario Andretti with his son Michael, and former F1 and Indycar driver Olivier Grouillard as their co-driver. Another C36 was again sponsored by the Elf La Filière young-driver academy. Joining the veteran Henri Pescarolo this year were Jean-Philippe Belloc and Emmanuel Clérico. Kremer Racing brought the same pair of K8 Spyders from last year. With the teams focus now on their GT cars in the BPR series, little work was done on the K8s. Regular Kremer GT drivers Tomás Saldaña and Carl Rosenblad were joined by Jürgen Lässig. The second car had former Minardi F1 driver Giovanni Lavaggi and Jean-Luc Maury-Laribière and Bernard Chauvin.

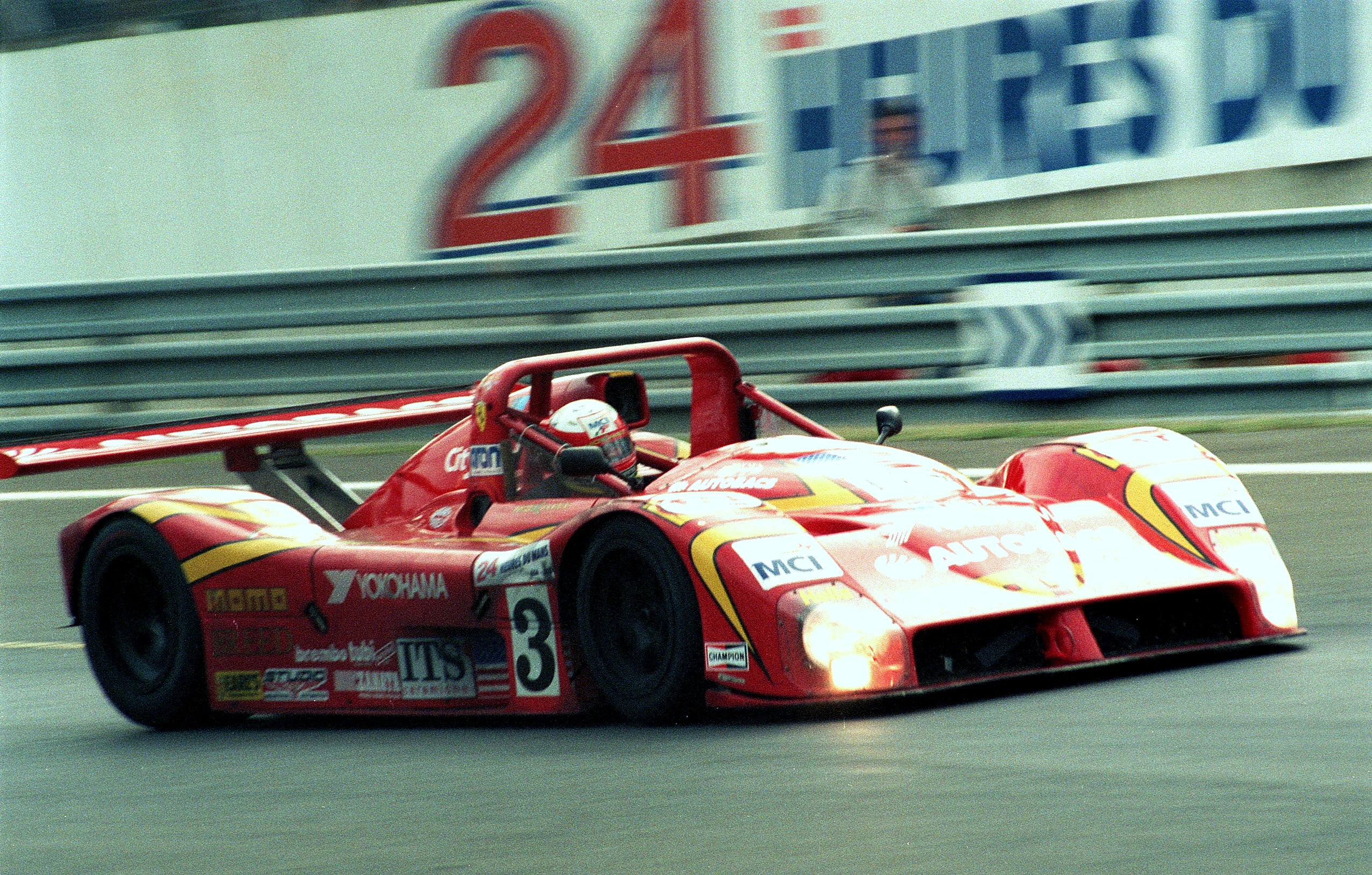
Momo Ferrari 333SP

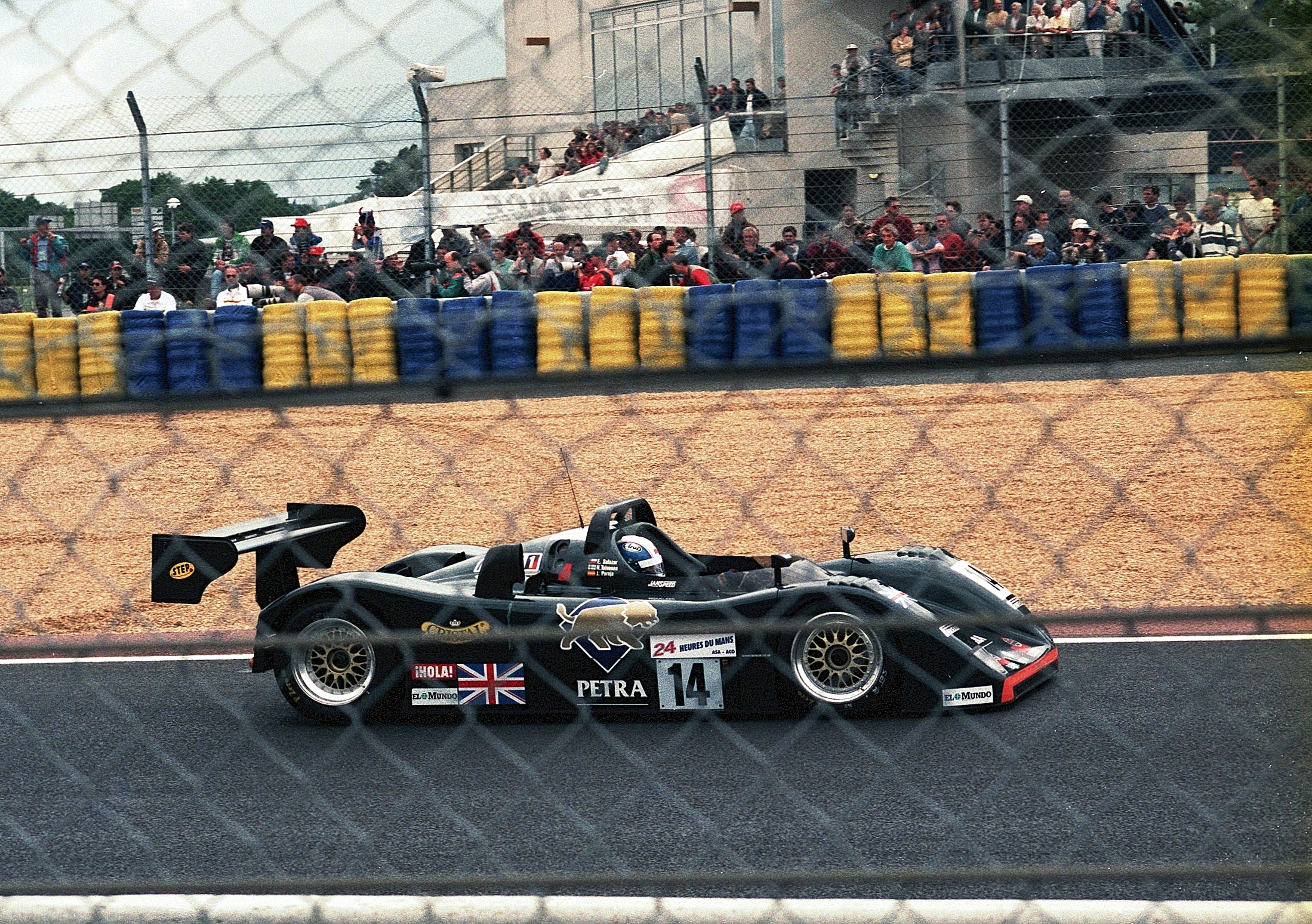
BRM P301

There was a sizeable entry from the IMSA GT Championship headlined by Ferrari. Two of the Ferrari 333 SP cars were entered. Gianpiero Moretti had bought the chassis run the previous year as the “Racing for Belgium” car from Team Scandia, while Michel Ferté's Pilot Racing had purchased their car from the EuroMotorsports team. Both cars arrived with the original body kit and although the Pilot car had not raced since the 1994 IMSA season (when it had scored the first victory for the 333 SP), Moretti's Momo Racing had proven competitive, recently winning the Lime Rock Park round in May. Moretti, now 57-years old, was back at Le Mans for the first time since he was in a Ferrari 512S in 1970, and raced with his regular co-drivers in 1996, Didier Theys and Max Papis.

Mazdaspeed worked again with their American representative Jim Downing. The tenth Kudzu chassis, the DLM4 was designed around the Mazda R26B quad-rotor engine that had formerly fitted in the 1991-winning Mazda 787B. Downing had finally convinced IMSA to allow the quad-rotor into the WSC. The ACO in turn required the car to run in the LM-P875 class, set up to the WSC regulations. Designed by Dave Lynn, the chassis had a longer wheelbase for the bigger engine. It had to run with a 5-speed gearbox and iron brakes, and the engine was limited to 560 bhp. The issue with rotary engines was the greater heat they generated, so the aerodynamics had to accommodate airflow to the engine. However, the drag created hobbled the top speed, not helped by the 150 kg increase in weight from the previous ultralight P2 DLM. Further engine issues meant the car failed pre-qualifying until a reprieve came from the withdrawal of the WR team. Extensive mechanical and aerodynamic work were done to improve the design. Downing once again raced with the same drivers, Yojiro Terada and Franck Fréon, that he had for the past two years.

In 1992 BRM entered Le Mans with its model P351 and it returned again this year. The chassis had been bought Keith Wiggins for his Pacific Racing team that had recently left Formula 1 after an unsuccessful foray. Rebranded the P301 it had a major revamp from Pacific engineer Peter Weston to comply to the new regulations. Converted to an open-top, spyder format, the rear-end was modified to replace the 3.5-litre V12 with the more compact Nissan 3.0-litre V6 turbo. Harri Toivonen, who had driven the BRM back in 1992, was lead driver, alongside veterans Eliseo Salazar and Jesús Pareja.

=== LM GT1 ===
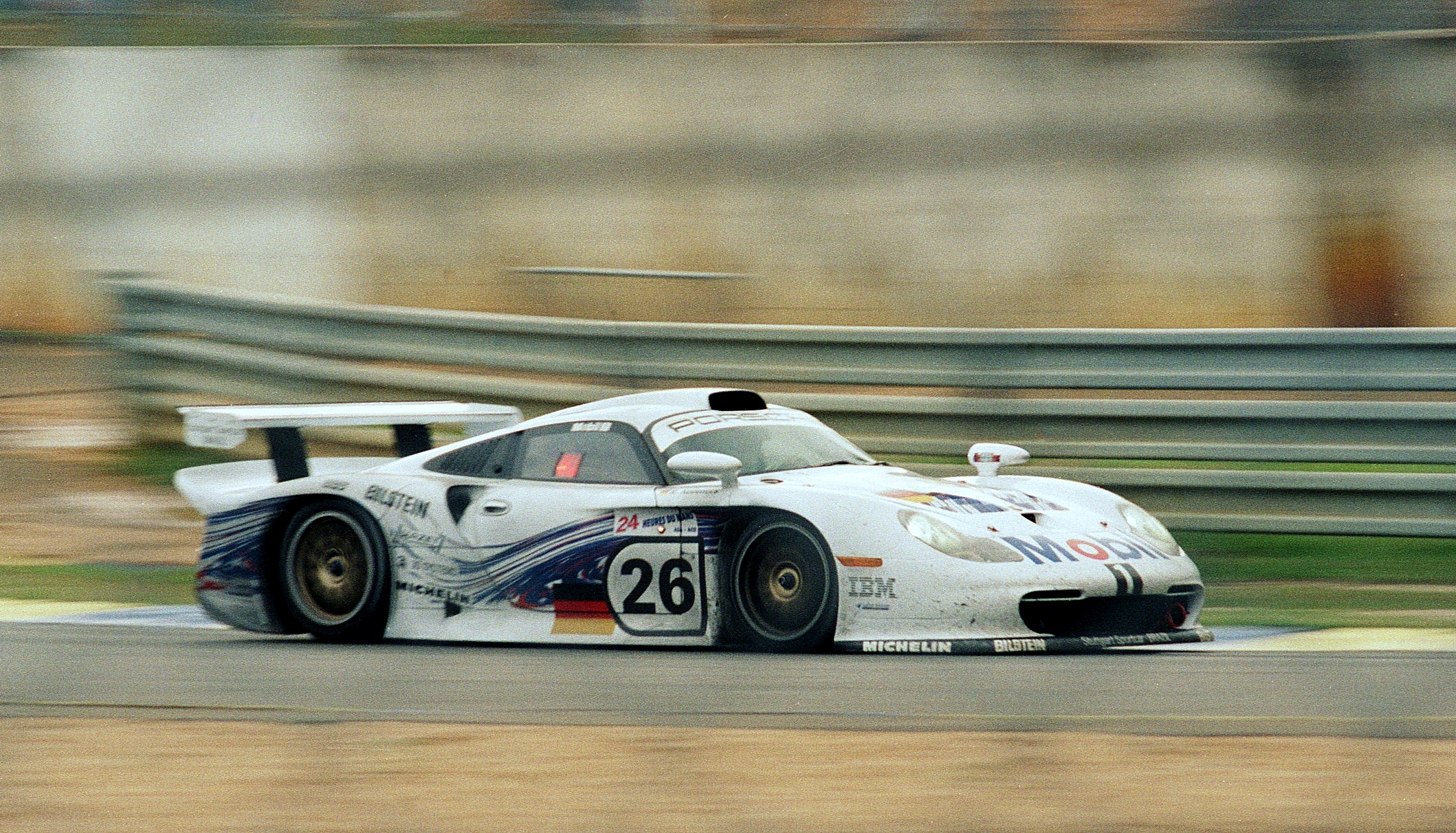
Porsche 911 GT1 Evo

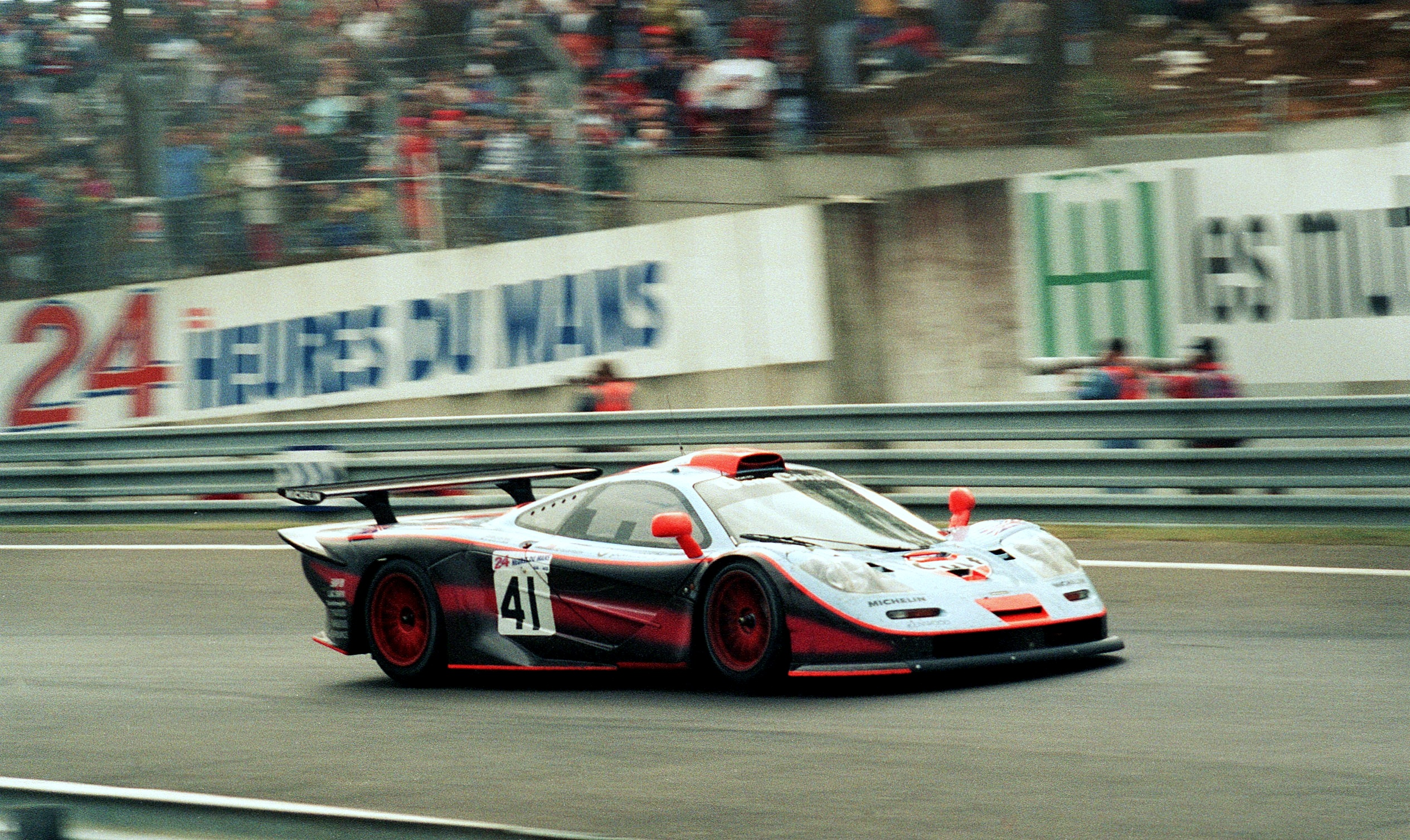
McLaren F1 GTR

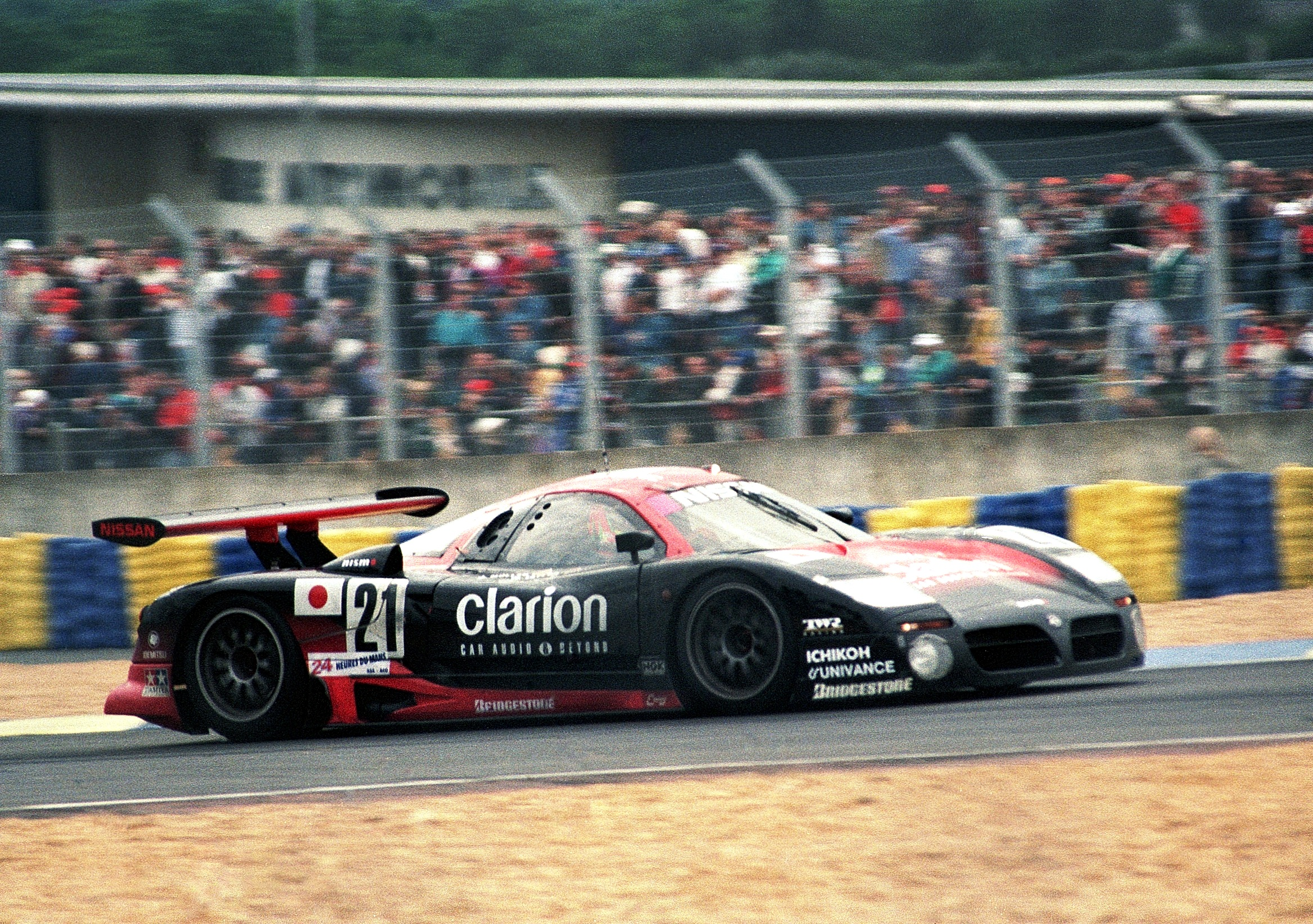
Nissan R390

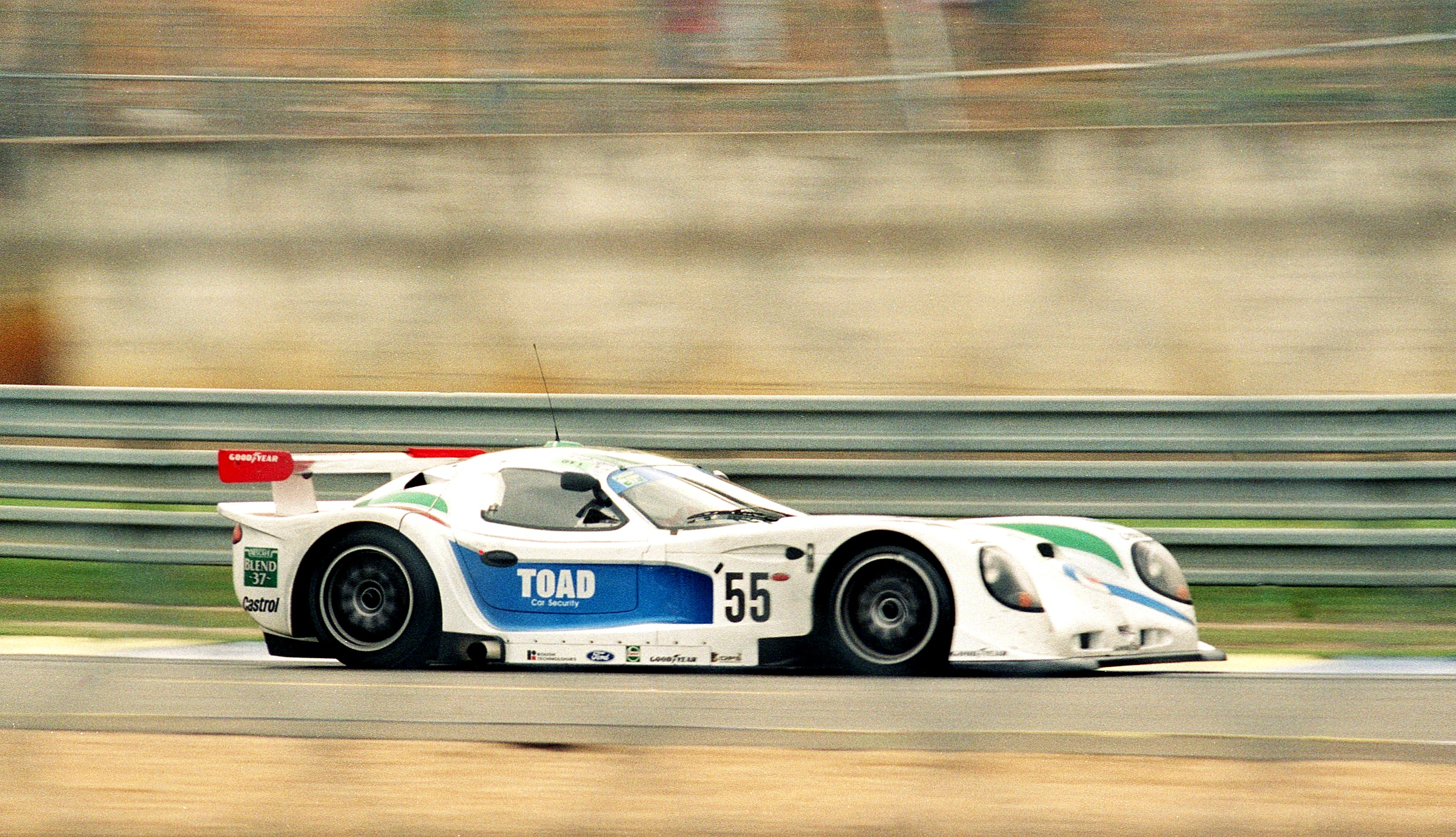
Panoz Esperante GTR-1

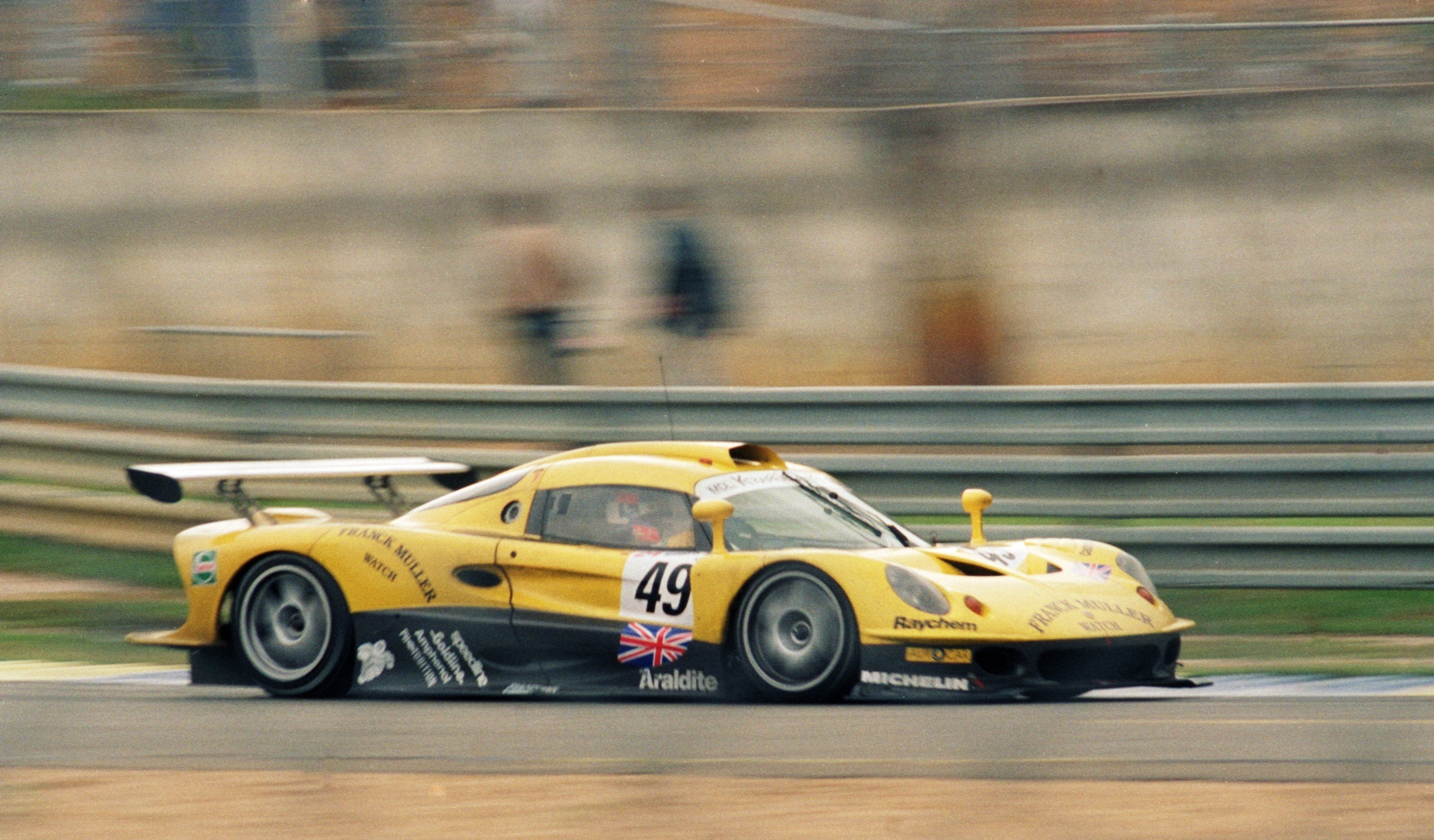
Lotus Elise GT1

The Porsche 911 GT1 had made a big impact in its debut in the 1995 race. Porsche brought a pair of their next iteration, the GT1 Evo. The chassis and engine remained the same, as was the suspension except to widen it slightly and that its ABS brakes were banned. The main changes were improvements to the bodyshell with a more smoothly-curved aerodynamic shape. However, the FIA imposed smaller air restrictors on the car and banned ABS brakes that made it much less competitive in the Championship. However, with the ACO running lighter restrictions on turbo power, the water-cooled 3.2-litre engine could still make 590 bhp. The suspension was also upgraded to improve the sometime difficult handling. Hans-Joachim Stuck, Thierry Boutsen and Bob Wollek were again teamed up in one car, while Emmanuel Collard and Ralf Kelleners joined Yannick Dalmas in the other. Meanwhile, over the close season Porsche had opened up its 911 GT1 for customer sales. Thirty road-going versions had been produced, selling for about £450,000 each. Six customer cars were entered at Le Mans. Porsche stalwarts Kremer Racing backed up their prototypes with a GT1, with Le Mans winners Christophe Bouchut (with Peugeot, 1992) and Bertrand Gachot (with Mazda, 1991) along with IMSA owner Andy Evans. The fellow German teams of Roock Racing and Franz Konrad stepped up from the GT2 class this year in the GT Championship, bringing those cars to France. Roock had their regular team-driver Stéphane Ortelli with former Sauber F1 driver Karl Wendlinger and rookie Allan McNish. Konrad piloted his car with 1994 winner Mauro Baldi and Robert Nairn. Giuseppe Lucchini's BMS Scuderia Italia team had competed in Formula 1 from 1988 to 1993 without success. Coming into touring cars, this year they entered the GT Championship with Pierluigi Martini and Christian Pescatori. Also new to GT1 were the French JB Racing (of former F1 Renault driver Jean-Pierre Jabouille) and Schübel Rennsport (with Pedro Lamy/Armin Hahne/Patrice Goueslard).

For McLaren Cars, the 1996 race had shown up that the F1 GTR was being outclassed by the new designs, despite winning the BPR Championship. Designer Gordon Murray and his team worked on reducing weight and increasing downforce, focusing on the rear end and suspension. BMW reduced the capacity slightly to 5990cc and lightened the engine by 25 kg. After the issues from the 1996 race, a new Xtrac 6-speed sequential gearbox was installed. Overall, 100 kg was trimmed with a wider, longer shell that further improved downforce. The BMW-Schnitzer works team had four cars, while another six of the new cars were sold: four more to Ray Bellm's Gulf Racing team and one each to Kazimuchi Goh's Team Lark and the new English Parabolica Motorsport team. The power remained at 600 bhp. As the road-cars were fitted with ABS brakes, they were eligible for the race-cars as well, although only those of the BMW works team chose to have them. The extra work in turn allowed bigger air-restrictors that meant the BMW works cars could generate up to 650 bhp. The Schnitzer works team had a dominant start to the season, winning all three of the opening rounds of the Championship between their two cars. Two of those went to JJ Lehto and Steve Soper, who raced with F1 champion Nelson Piquet), and Roberto Ravaglia/Peter Kox had McLaren F1 test driver Éric Hélary as their co-driver. Likewise, the Gulf team entered the three cars they were running in the GT Championship: Bellm and Andrew Gilbert-Scott were joined by McLaren Le Mans-winner Masanori Sekiya; Bellm's fellow team-owner Thomas Bscher raced with John Nielsen and Chris Goodwin while the third car of Pierre-Henri Raphanel and Jean-Marc Gounon got Anders Olofsson. Goh did not have a Le Mans entry but agreed to sponsor David Morrison's Parabolica Motorsport car and join forces. The latter's Gary Ayles had Team Lark's Akihiko Nakaya and Keiichi Tsuchiya. Such was the strength of field, the 1996-spec car of BBA Compétition failed to pass the Pre-Qualification.

This year Nissan came to Le Mans with a completely new model – the R390 GT1. A deal was arranged with Tom Walkinshaw Racing in September 1996 for a 2-year GT1 project specifically for Le Mans. Designed by Tony Southgate (ex-Jaguar, ex-Toyota and ex-Ferrari), the cars were built in England. Five were commissioned, including one as the requisite road-car for homologation. A low, dropping shape at front and rear, the carbon/kevlar body had been designed to maximise downforce with diffuser channels at both ends to direct airflow past the carbon brakes. The 3.5-litre VRH35L V8 engine could trace its heritage to the 1000 bhp beast that powered the Nissan Group C cars of 1988–90. With 4-valves per cylinder and twin ICI turbochargers, it could develop 600 bhp through the same 6-speed Xtrac sequential gearbox in the McLarens. When the spare chassis failed the mandatory crash-testing after a redesign, one of the race-chassis had to be used, before then completing 6000 km of testing at Estoril in Portugal. The remaining three cars were entered, with a strong driver lineup. Endurance experts Martin Brundle and Wayne Taylor had the lead car, with rookie Jörg Müller. Originally, Mauro Martini was slated for the drive but when he was injured in a mountain-biking accident, Taylor was brought in. Former F1 drivers Riccardo Patrese, Eric van de Poele and Aguri Suzuki ran the second while the third had the works drivers from the All-Japan GT Championship, Kazuyoshi Hoshino, Masahiko Kageyama and Érik Comas. All the preparation paid off when Brundle set the fastest time at the Pre-Qualifying weekend. However, only ten days before the race, Nissan was told by the ACO of the new FIA requirement to have a defined 125-litre luggage-space. This decision infuriated the team, who appealed that they had designed a car to existing European specifications, but it fell on deaf ears. Rushed modifications during race-week to create boot-space forced the redirecting of the airflow cooling the gearbox.

The Lister works team returned with the latest version of the Lister Storm GTL (‘L’ for Lightweight). It was lengthened to accommodate a better diffuser in the rear and a longer overhang ahead of the front wheels. Over 80 kg of weight was pruned off the chassis and engine, now comparable to the Porsches and Nissans. The big Jaguar 7.0-litre V12 was tuned in-house up to 650 bhp. Two cars were entered for Le Mans, although one was wrecked at the opening round of the British GT championship. In three weeks, after the Pre-Qualifying, a new car was built. Both arrived for race-week, decked out again in the black and white stripes of Newcastle United Football Club. The car had looked strong in the Daytona 24-hours at the start of the year, running in the top-3 in class until the gearbox broke, and both easily made it through at the Pre-Qualifying. Geoff Lees again led a strong driver line-up with Tiff Needell and South African George Fouché, while his regular British GT teammate, Julian Bailey raced with Thomas Erdos and (then) 2-time Australian Touring Car champion Mark Skaife. Lotus returned to Le Mans this year, having last entered in 1994 with the Esprit in the GT2 class. This year, they moved up to GT1 with their new model, the Elise. Designed by engineer Richard Rackham, the aerodynamic carbon-fibre/kevlar shell was mounted on an epoxy-bonded aluminium-alloy frame. Originally to take the Lotus V8 turbo in the Esprit, the new GT regulations hit it with harsh restrictors, so the decision was made to instead use the Chevrolet 6-litre V8 from the Corvette ZR-1 that Lotus had been involved with the design of when part of the GM group. Tuned to put out 575 bhp it ran through a 6-speed Hewland gearbox. Two cars were entered by the works factory, with Jan Lammers/Mike Hezemans/Alexander Grau and Fabien Giroix/Jean-Denis Delétraz/Ratanakul Prutirat as the drivers.

The IMSA invasion was augmented by the arrival of the visually distinctive Panoz Esperante GTR-1. Italo-American Don Panoz had made his money in pharmaceuticals (including the nicotine patch) before helping his son Danny found a low-volume sportscar company. Their first car, the AIV Roadster went into production in 1997, when Panoz Motorsports was also set up, based at the Road Atlanta track in Georgia which Panoz had purchased 6 months earlier. Reynard Motorsport, currently dominating the CART series, was commissioned to design their first racing model: the GTR-1. That team was led by John Piper, who had Nigel Stroud to assist with aerodynamics (who had earlier worked on the Mazda 787). Danny wanted a front-engined car with a stock Ford V8 engine. It was built on a honeycomb-monocoque with a bodyshell made by David Price's DPS Composites in the UK. The low-slung chassis had the cockpit mounted behind the centre-line, but that meant the engine needed support from steel tubing. The purpose-built 6-speed gearbox was mounted at the rear to further help with the weight-bias. Reynard's CART experience meant key components were mounted as single units for ease of maintenance. The team got Roush Engines to develop the 6-litre Ford V8. Based on the current NASCAR engine, it was also used in the IMSA-winning Riley & Scott Mk III WSC and was tuned to reach 600 bhp with the requisite ACO air restrictors. After a DNF at the Sebring 12 hours in its first race, the Panoz then won the Road Atlanta GT race, and won its class at the Watkins Glen 6-hour. Don Panoz arranged with David Price to run two cars in the World Championship and at Le Mans, joined by British TV celebrity Noel Edmonds. His two successful IMSA drivers, Andy Wallace and Harry "Doc" Bundy led the driver lines-ups with Butch Leitzinger and James Weaver (current leaders in the IMSA WSC series) with the former and David Brabham and Perry McCarthy with the latter. Two further chassis were entered by the DAMS team of René Arnoux, expanding on its success in single-seater racing. The team chose to use a Zytek engine-management system instead of the Roush-supplied one and that did seem to alleviate a number of issues that DPR had. However, only one made it past Pre-Qualifying, having the all-French line-up of Franck Lagorce, Éric Bernard and Jean-Christophe Boullion who had all previously raced for DAMS in Formula 3000.

=== LM GT2 ===
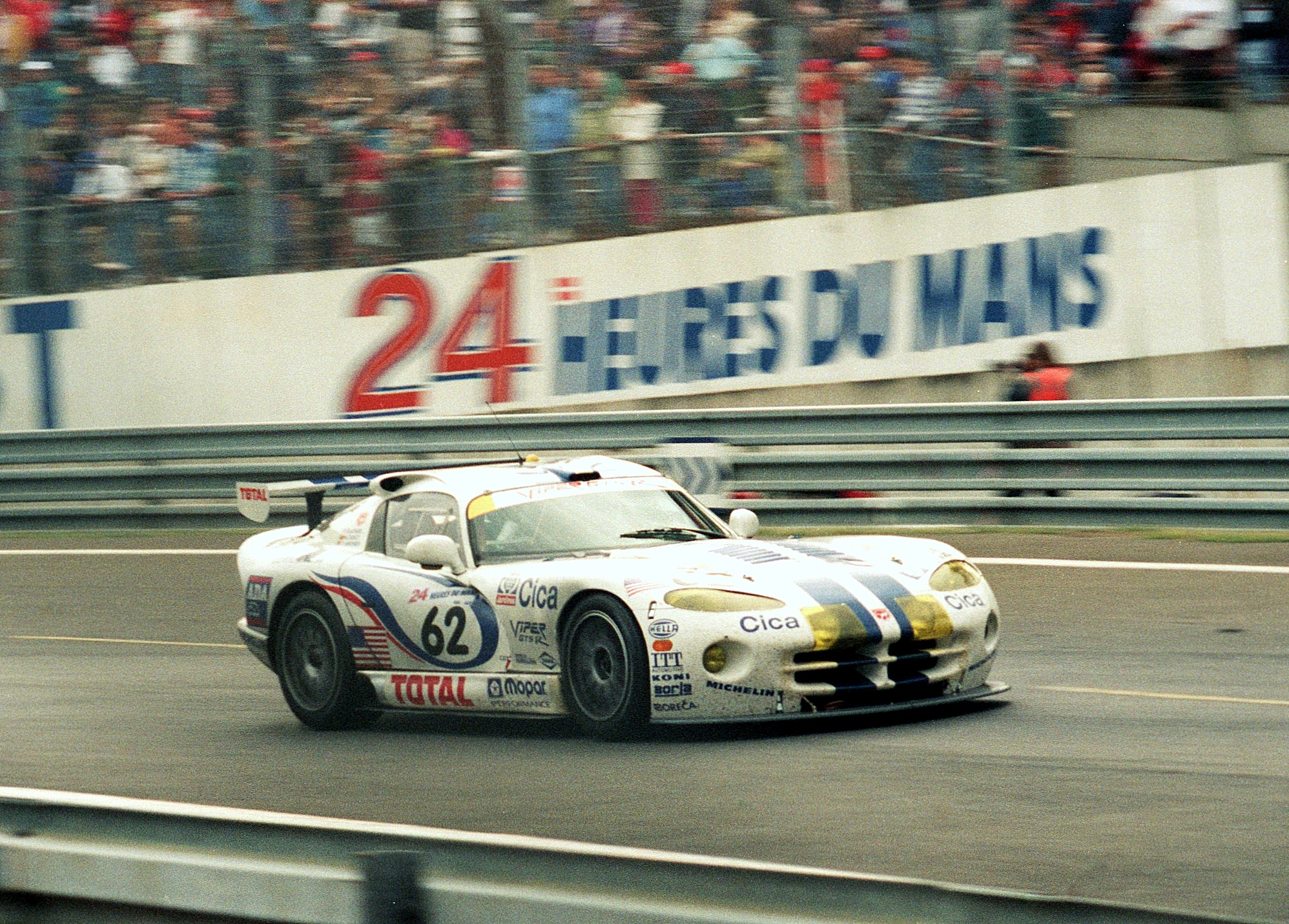
ORECA Team Viper GTS-R

Once again, the biggest representation among the 16 starters in GT2 was Porsche with 8 entries, all using the latest 993 GT2 iteration. The strong Roock Racing and Larbre Compétition teams (1996 and 1994 class-winners respectively) both had two cars on the grid. Roock's lead driver, Bruno Eichmann, was partnered by André Ahrlé and Andy Pilgrim in one car while the other had the three Portuguese Mello-Breyner brothers. Jack Leconte's Larbre Compétition again ran the Porsche of Jean-Luc Chéreau moving from GT1 to GT2, and this year, Leconte and Chéreau were joined by Jean-Pierre Jarier. Their other car was led by Patrick Bourdais. Konrad Motorsport had a second Championship car, running in the GT2 series, with Toni Seiler and Michel Ligonnet as drivers. Swiss team Stadler Motorsport qualified this year, with regular drivers Enzo Calderari and Lilian Bryner while former teammate Luigino Pagotto had his own new outfit, GT Racing Team, and signed Roock Racing's Claudia Hürtgen for this race. Finally, privateer Guido Haberthur returned to Le Mans with his 2-year-old Porsche, having enticed last year's class-winner Guy Martinolle into his squad.

Chrysler’s foray with the Dodge Viper into GT1 the previous year had proven underwhelming, and in the face of the strong opposition, instead chose to adapt the cars for the GT2 regulations. The French ORECA team were brought fully on board as the works team to develop, build and race the cars. They set about updating the transmission, suspension, brakes and steering all with a lighter-weight chassis. The engine was also re-tuned to run at higher revs given the smaller air restrictors of the GT2 class. The brand arrived at Le Mans in force with five cars. ORECA was running two cars in the Championship and split their drivers among three cars: Olivier Beretta and Philippe Gache, class winners at the first round, were joined by Dominique Dupuy, himself twice a class-winner at Le Mans with Larbre Compétition. Justin Bell and Tommy Archer, who had won the class at the second round were in separate cars. Bell raced with the experienced John Morton and Pierre Yver, who had both first come to Le Mans in the 1970s, while Trans-Am expert Tommy Archer had Belgian veteran Marc Duez and French rookie Soheil Ayari. ORECA had sold two of their cars to Chamberlain Engineering that they were also running in the Championship, and which came to Le Mans.

Agusta Racing Team brought their 3-year old Callaway Corvette back to Le Mans. Aside from much-improved ferrous brakes, the main change was the swap from the 6.25-litre Chevrolet LT-1 to the 5.9-litre LT-5 engine that put out a lower 450 bhp. Once again, team owner “Rocky” Agusta raced with his regular co-driver Almo Coppelli, with Éric Graham as the third driver. Dutchman Cor Euser and his Team Marcos International came to the race with two cars, comprising the chassis raced in 1996 and a new car. Like the Callaway, the engine was reduced with their LT-5 coming from 6.1 to 5.9-litres.

Steve Saleen had raced Ford Mustangs in the American Trans-Am series, and his company had been production road-car conversions and upgrades since 1984. The Saleen SR was introduced in 1994 and, in partnership with TV comedian Tim Allen developed the Saleen RRR racing version raced under their RRR Speedlab team. Based on the current Ford Mustang model, it broadly conformed to the GT2 regulations, with kevlar panels but limited aerodynamics. Although not an official Ford works team, the company did offer their Special Vehicle Engineering unit to assist with suspension and technical set-up. The twin-valve 5.9-litre Ford V8 was tuned by McLaren Engines and with electronic fuel injection could produce 500 bhp pushing the car up to 315 kph (195 mph). Two cars were prepared for Le Mans, one with the original Xtrac 6-speed gearbox, the other with a more standard Hewland 5-speed. Saleen himself ran the Hewland-Mustang with Le Mans-winning American Price Cobb and Spaniard Carlos Palau and the X-trac-Mustang was run by Brits Schirle/Warnock/Lloyd.

== Practice and Qualifying ==
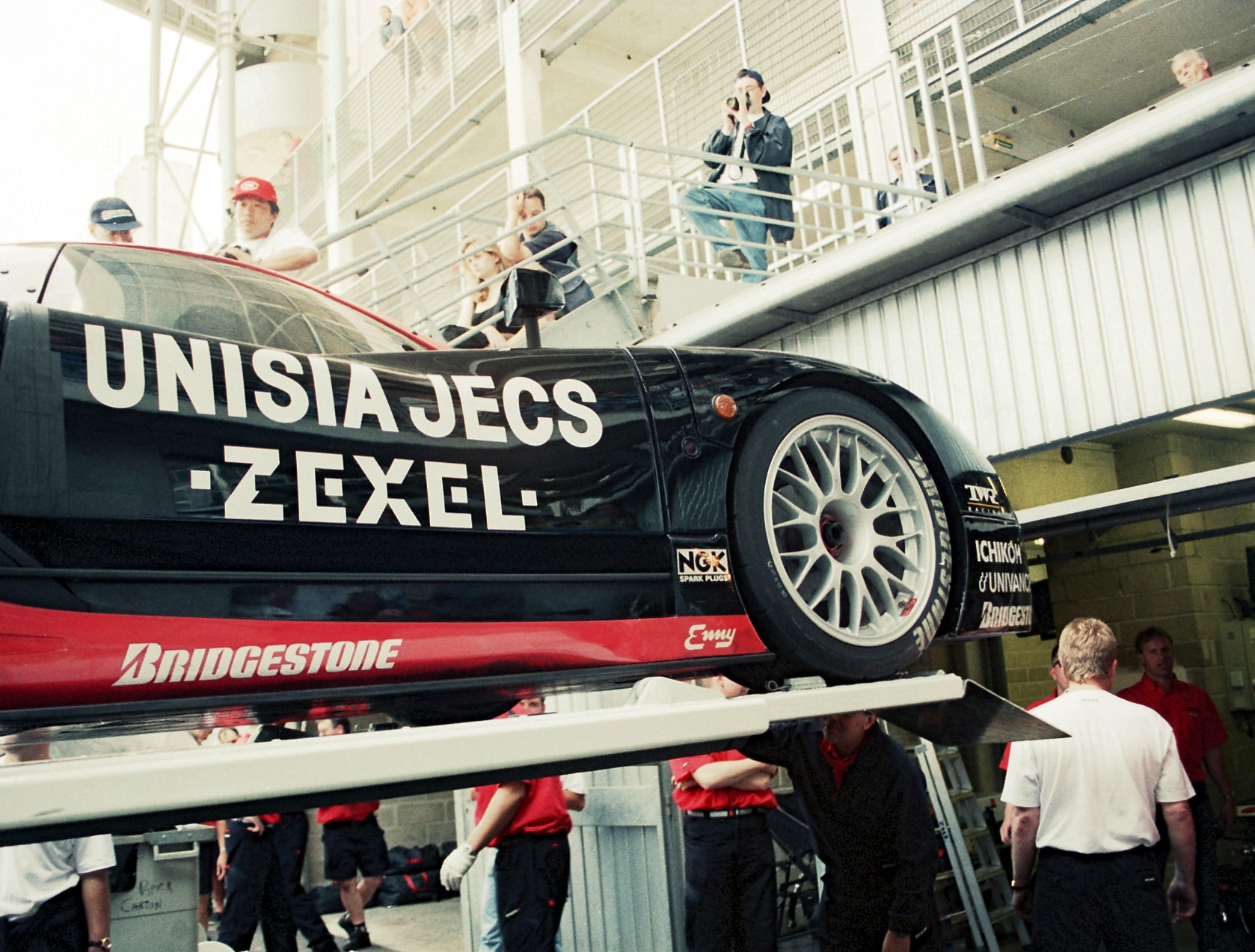
Unloading a Nissan R390 at the paddock for qualifying

May's Pre-Qualification was marred by the tragic death of Frenchman Sébastien Enjolras when bodywork on his WM came loose that made the car go airborne over the safety barriers after Arnage. The car hit a pole and burst into flame with Enjolras killed instantly, the first death at Le Mans for a decade. Welter Racing withdrew their entries. The promising 21-year-old had been part of the winning car at the Coupe d’Automne that had earned the team their automatic entry. The quickest car in the weekend was the new Nissan driven by Martin Brundle, while Alboreto was second in the TWR-Porsche, getting testing-time despite their automatic entry. It was also the first appearance of the Porsche 911 GT1 Evo.

This year, the 52 cars from Pre-Qualifying and Automatic Entry lists would be culled down to a final 48 starters on the grid – with two each dropped from the prototypes and the GTs. On the Wednesday it was Boutsen in the works Porsche that set the pace. Then on Thursday, Alboreto put in a very quick time of 3:41.6, fully 5 seconds faster than the 1996 pole-time. Boutsen came back with strong run but fell short with a 3:43.4. Third quickest was van der Poele in the Nissan (3:45.3) just ahead of Lehto in the works McLaren (3:45.4) and Collard in the second works Porsche (3:45.5). In a strong effort, Martini put the Scuderia Italia Porsche in 6th just half a second down on the works cars (3:45.9). Despite having been top at pre-qualifying, Brundle could only manage 7th in practice with a 3:46.2 while the Lark/Parabolica entry was 10th, surprising as the second-quickest McLaren (3:47.1) after a hot lap by Gary Ayles. Although Theys, in the Momo Ferrari, lapped half-a-second faster than van der Poele did the year before, it was only good enough for 9th (3:46.4), putting them on the second row of the WSC grid. Behind the Ferrari was Policand in the first of the Courages (3:47.7). La Filière Courage needed extensive repairs on Thursday night after Clérico clouted the pit-wall. The work on the Kudzu had paid off with a 3:56.1, over 2 seconds faster than in its Pre-Qualifying.

Facing the drop in GT1 were the small British teams – David Price's Panoz, the works Lotus and Newcastle Lister – each with a pair of cars. The situation was eased after a fire on the third Gulf McLaren. Despite John Nielsen already qualifying it, the car was too badly damaged to repair in time and had to be scratched. The beneficiary of that was Andy Wallace's Panoz that had been off the pace with power and engine issues. Missing the cut in GT1 was the second Lotus which had electrical issues and terrible handling that stopped reliable times being set, and the second Marcos which needed an engine-change after Maunier over-revved it. The quicker of the two Kremers was put out when Lavaggi crashed in the Esses on the Thursday with no time left to repair and put in qualifying laps. In GT2, it was the two ORECA Vipers that started at the front of the class, in 33rd and 34th on the grid. Archer (4:04.6) and Beretta (4:04.7) put in qualifying times over two seconds faster than the nearest competition – Price Cobb surprised his boss by qualifying the Saleen Mustang third (4:06.9), ahead of all the Porsches. The best of those was fourth: Jarier, the old lion, with a 4:07.1 in the Larbre-Chéreau car.

=== Starting Grid ===
Class leaders are in bold.

Pos	Class	Team	Pos	Class	Team
Pos	Class	Car	Pos	Class	Car
Pos	Class	Time	Pos	Class	Time
1	**LM-P875**	**#7 Joest Racing**	2	**LM-GT1**	**#25 Porsche AG**
1	**LM-P875**	TWR Porsche WSC95	2	**LM-GT1**	Porsche 911 GT1 Evo
1	**LM-P875**	3:41.58	2	**LM-GT1**	3:43.36
3	LM-P875	#3 Momo Racing	4	LM-GT1	#22 NISMO
3	LM-P875	Ferrari 333SP	4	LM-GT1	Nissan R390 GT1
3	LM-P875	3:46.43	4	LM-GT1	3:45.32
5	LM-P875	#13 Courage Compétition	6	LM-GT1	#42 BMW Motorsport
5	LM-P875	Courage C41	6	LM-GT1	McLaren F1 GTR 97
5	LM-P875	3:47.66	6	LM-GT1	3:45.40
7	LM-P875	#10 Courage Compétition	8	LM-GT1	#26 Porsche AG
7	LM-P875	Courage C36	8	LM-GT1	Porsche 911 GT1 Evo
7	LM-P875	3:48.01	8	LM-GT1	3:45.49
9	LM-P875	#8 La Filière Elf	10	LM-GT1	#27 BMS Scuderia Italia
9	LM-P875	Courage C36	10	LM-GT1	Porsche 911 GT1
9	LM-P875	3:48.65	10	LM-GT1	3:45.91
11	LM-P875	#4 Ferté Pilot Racing	12	LM-GT1	#21 NISMO
11	LM-P875	Ferrari 333SP	12	LM-GT1	Nissan R390 GT1
11	LM-P875	3:51.09	12	LM-GT1	3:46.23
13	LM-P875	#9 Courage Compétition	14	LM-GT1	#30 Kremer Racing
13	LM-P875	Courage C36	14	LM-GT1	Porsche 911 GT1
13	LM-P875	3:51.38	14	LM-GT1	3:46.39
15	LM-P875	#5 Kremer Racing	16	LM-GT1	#44 Team Lark McLaren
15	LM-P875	Kremer K8	16	LM-GT1	McLaren F1 GTR 97
15	LM-P875	3:55.98	16	LM-GT1	3:47.11
17	LM-P875	#15 Team DTR	18	LM-GT1	#32 Roock Racing International
17	LM-P875	Kudzu DLM4	18	LM-GT1	Porsche 911 GT1
17	LM-P875	3:56.12	18	LM-GT1	3:47.31
19	LM-P875	#14 Pacific Racing	20	LM-GT1	#33 Schübel Engineering
19	LM-P875	BRM P301	20	LM-GT1	Porsche 911 GT1
19	LM-P875	3:56.73	20	LM-GT1	3:47.43
21	LM-GT1	#23 NISMO	22	LM-GT1	#43 BMW Motorsport
21	LM-GT1	Nissan R390 GT1	22	LM-GT1	McLaren F1 GTR LM 97
21	LM-GT1	3:47.75	22	LM-GT1	3:48.06
23	LM-GT1	#52 DAMS	24	LM-GT1	#29 JB Racing
23	LM-GT1	Panoz Esperante GTR-1	24	LM-GT1	Porsche 911 GT1
23	LM-GT1	3:48.12	24	LM-GT1	3:48.34
25	LM-GT1	#41 Gulf Team Davidoff	26	LM-GT1	#49 GTI Lotus Racing
25	LM-GT1	McLaren F1 GTR LM 97	26	LM-GT1	Lotus Elise GT1
25	LM-GT1	3:48.37	26	LM-GT1	3:48.40
27	LM-GT1	#39 Gulf Team Davidoff	28	LM-GT1	#28 Konrad Motorsport
27	LM-GT1	McLaren F1 GTR LM 97	28	LM-GT1	Porsche 911 GT1
27	LM-GT1	3:48.67	28	LM-GT1	3:49.47
29	LM-GT1	#46 Newcastle United Lister	30	LM-GT1	#55 David Price Racing
29	LM-GT1	Lister Storm GTL	30	LM-GT1	Panoz Esperante GTR-1
29	LM-GT1	3:49.65	30	LM-GT1	3:49.70
31	LM-GT1	#45 Newcastle United Lister	32	LM-GT1	#54 David Price Racing
31	LM-GT1	Lister Storm GTL	32	LM-GT1	Panoz Esperante GTR-1
31	LM-GT1	3:50.40	32	LM-GT1	3:50.85
33	**LM-GT2**	**#62 Viper Team ORECA**	34	LM-GT2	#61 Viper Team ORECA
33	**LM-GT2**	Chrysler Viper GTS-R	34	LM-GT2	Chrysler Viper GTS-R
33	**LM-GT2**	4:04.59	34	LM-GT2	4:04.65
35	LM-GT2	#67 Saleen-Allen Speedlab	36	LM-GT2	#77 Chéreau Sports
35	LM-GT2	Saleen Mustang RRR	36	LM-GT2	Porsche 911 GT2
35	LM-GT2	4:06.92	36	LM-GT2	4:07.14
37	LM-GT2	#74 Roock Racing Team	38	LM-GT2	#63 Viper Team ORECA
37	LM-GT2	Porsche 911 GT2	38	LM-GT2	Chrysler Viper GTS-R
37	LM-GT2	4:07.15	38	LM-GT2	4:08.08
39	LM-GT2	#66 Saleen-Allen Speedlab	40	LM-GT2	#60 Agusta Racing Team
39	LM-GT2	Saleen Mustang RRR	40	LM-GT2	Callaway Corvette LM-GT
39	LM-GT2	4:09.80	40	LM-GT2	4:10.05
41	LM-GT2	#84 Stadler Motorsport	42	LM-GT2	#73 Roock Racing Team
41	LM-GT2	Porsche 911 GT2	42	LM-GT2	Porsche 911 GT2
41	LM-GT2	4:10.09	42	LM-GT2	4:10.48
43	LM-GT2	#75 Larbre Compétition	44	LM-GT2	#78 Elf Haberthur Racing
43	LM-GT2	Porsche 911 GT2	44	LM-GT2	Porsche 911 GT2
43	LM-GT2	4:10.90	44	LM-GT2	4:11.13
45	LM-GT2	#80 GT Racing Team	46	LM-GT2	#70 Team Marcos
45	LM-GT2	Porsche 911 GT2	46	LM-GT2	Marcos Mantara 600LM
45	LM-GT2	4:11.63	46	LM-GT2	4:11.90
47	LM-GT2	#79 Konrad Motorsport	48	LM-GT2	#64 Chamberlain Engineering
47	LM-GT2	Porsche 911 GT2	48	LM-GT2	Chrysler Viper GTS-R
47	LM-GT2	4:11.91	48	LM-GT2	4:12.70

== Race ==
=== Start ===
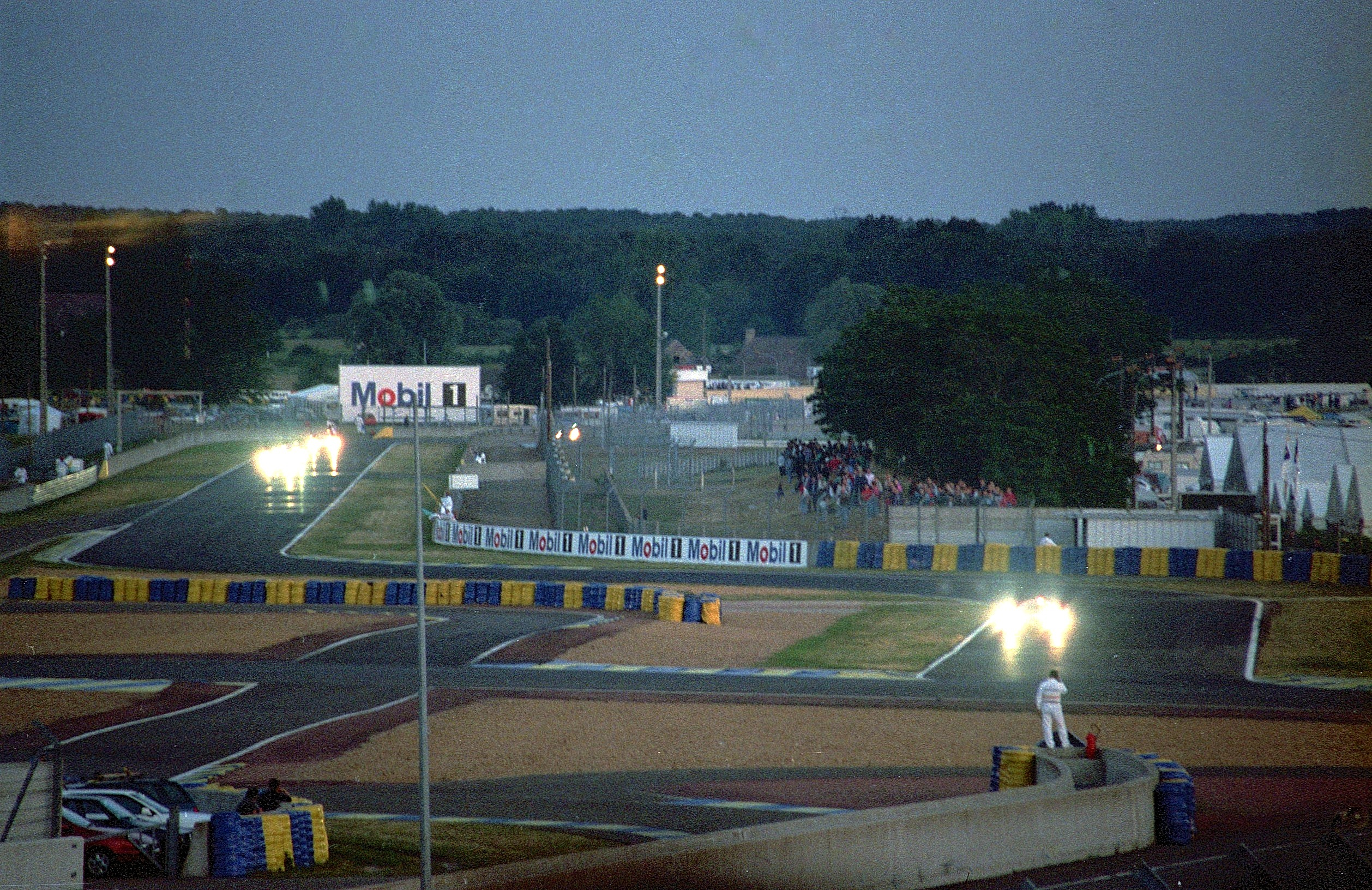
Ford Chicane at dusk

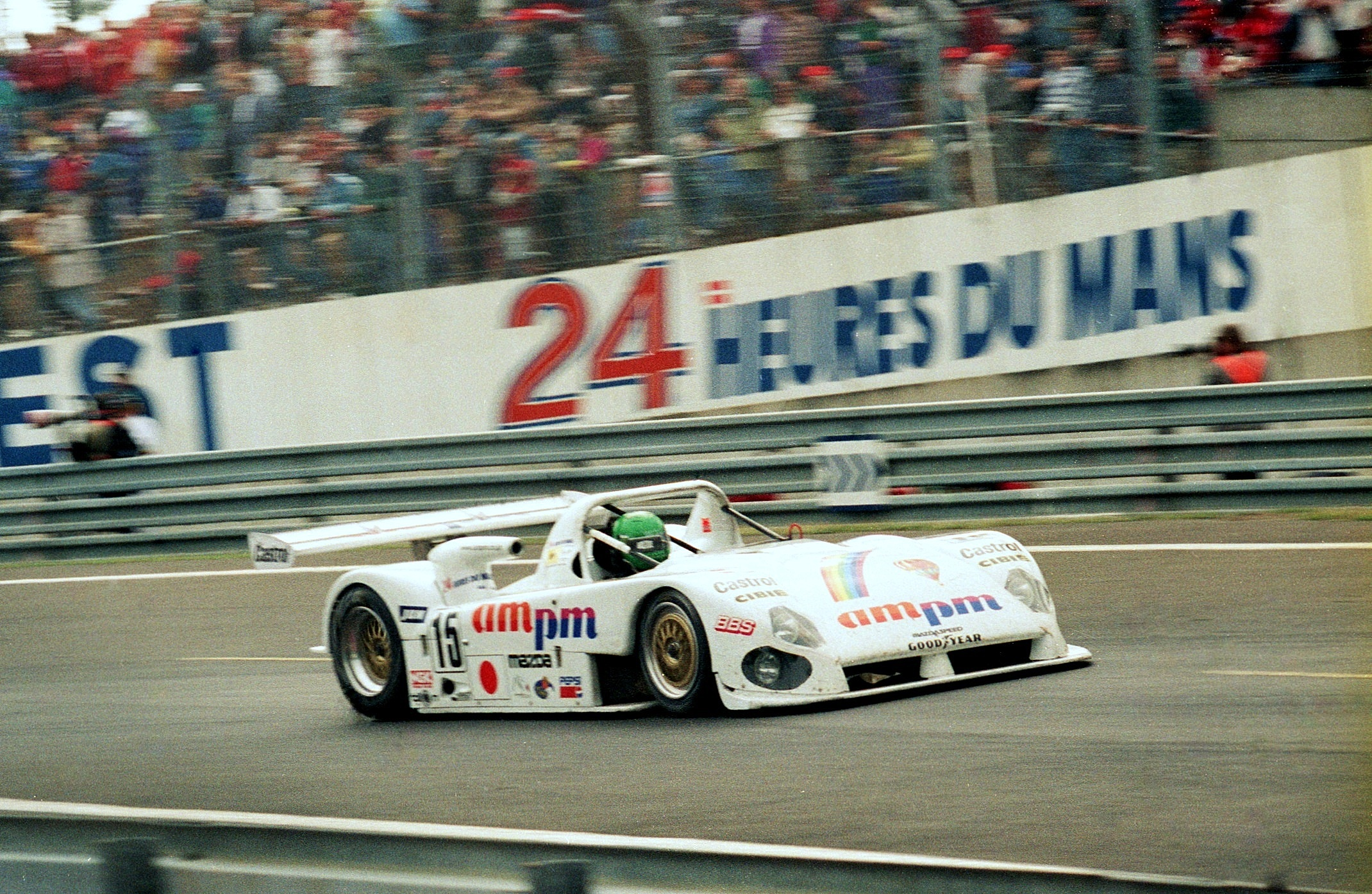
The Kudzu coming out of the Esses

The Sunday afternoon was grey and overcast. On the formation lap, Franck Lagorce in the DAMS Panoz ran into the back of Hoshino's Nissan in the Ford Chicane and had to crawl round, shedding debris, before pitting for a new nose-section, immediately losing several laps. At the start Wollek swept by into the lead with the Porsche. Four laps later, Alboreto reasserted the TWR's dominance and took back the lead, and he and van der Poele in the Nissan got a break on the field. Over the next two hours, Alboreto put in a strong triple-stint building his lead to a minute when he handed over to Johansson. The works Porsches, two of the Nissans and the BMW McLarens were close by. Lehto put in a strong drive to get his McLaren up into third in the first shift able to run fast, and longer, than the opposition. Back in the field, in the first hour, the Andretti Courage was in the pits running on three cylinders from a blown fuse, forcing the fuel to be changed. On lap 7, rookie McNish crashed the Roock GT1 Porsche in the Porsche Curves after suffering a puncture. He had already had urgent repairs on the grid when an oil leak was found. So, at the end of the first hour, Alboreto had done 16 laps, with Dalmas (Porsche), van der Poele (Nissan) and Lehto (McLaren) all less than 5 seconds behind. Twenty seconds back was Brundle (Nissan) and Bouchut (Porsche). Gradually though, the pursuers fell away: Patrese put his Nissan in the gravel and Brundle's needed its clutch replaced. Theys had been running the Momo Ferrari up to 7th but when the owner took the wheel, they slipped back down the field. Then at 7pm, there was the disturbing sight of all three Nissans in the pits with the same problem – their overheating gearboxes had, as feared, caused the oil coolers to come apart. Brundle had come in from 5th but left in 29th, Patrese had been 6th but fell to 35th to also replace the starter motor. The third car suffered the least impact on its race and stayed just inside the top-10.

In the third hour, Soper had just taken over his McLaren in 3rd, when he was back in the pits with the V12 overheating from a split water-pipe. The team lost 9 laps while it was repaired. When Johansson took over the TVR he set a more conservative pace, that allowed the works Porsches to run 1–2 by 8pm and into the night. Back in front, the racing experience of Wollek, Stuck and Boutsen meant they could routinely run 13 laps between pit-stops, compared to the 12 of their team-mates. Meanwhile, the TWR stayed in contact on the same lap as the Porsches, helped by their own better fuel consumption over the GTs to match the speed of the Porsches. In the second hour, Fouché spun his Lister backwards into the barriers at Arnage on his out-lap – the first of many incidents at that difficult corner. In the fourth hour, the second Lister had a major drama when a tyre blew when Erdos was speeding down the Mulsanne Straight, tearing up the rear bodywork. After repairs, it then needed a gearbox change and when further clutch problems arose the mechanics found the undertray was damaged and the car was retired in the small hours. Leitzinger ran his Panoz out of fuel at pit entry and then burnt out the starter motor trying to creep to his pit-box. The repairs cost 10 laps. The Lark McLaren had been running in the top dozen most of the evening, but at 9.30pm Nakaya ran wide at Tertre Rouge, clouting the kerb. Spinning back across the track it hit the inside barrier, dropping gravel and debris all over the track and causing terminal damage.

From the outset in GT2, as expected it was the ORECA Vipers setting the pace, dominating the class for the first hours until at 7.20pm, Beretta's car lost 17 minutes pitting with a broken throttle linkage. Then, less than two hours later, Ayari spun the leading Viper at the Porsche curves, slamming heavily into the guardrails. Sliding down the length for 100 metres it burst into flames when the fuel tank punctured, although the driver escaped unscathed. The Agusta Corvette had been running behind the Vipers until it stopped with a misfire caused by ignition problems. It was Calderari in the Stadler Porsche that took the lead until sidelined by engine troubles, whereupon the recovering Beretta car retook the class lead into the night. British hopes for the remaining Marcos literally went up in huge cloud of smoke when its engine detonated after only 15 laps.

By 10pm, as the sun was going down, the two Porsches had completed 90 laps, with the TWR a minute back, clearly in their own race. The Gounon/Raphanel GTC McLaren was a further two minutes behind and a lap back were the other McLarens of Roberto Ravaglia and Ray Bellm scrapping with the Porsches and Nissans.

=== Night ===
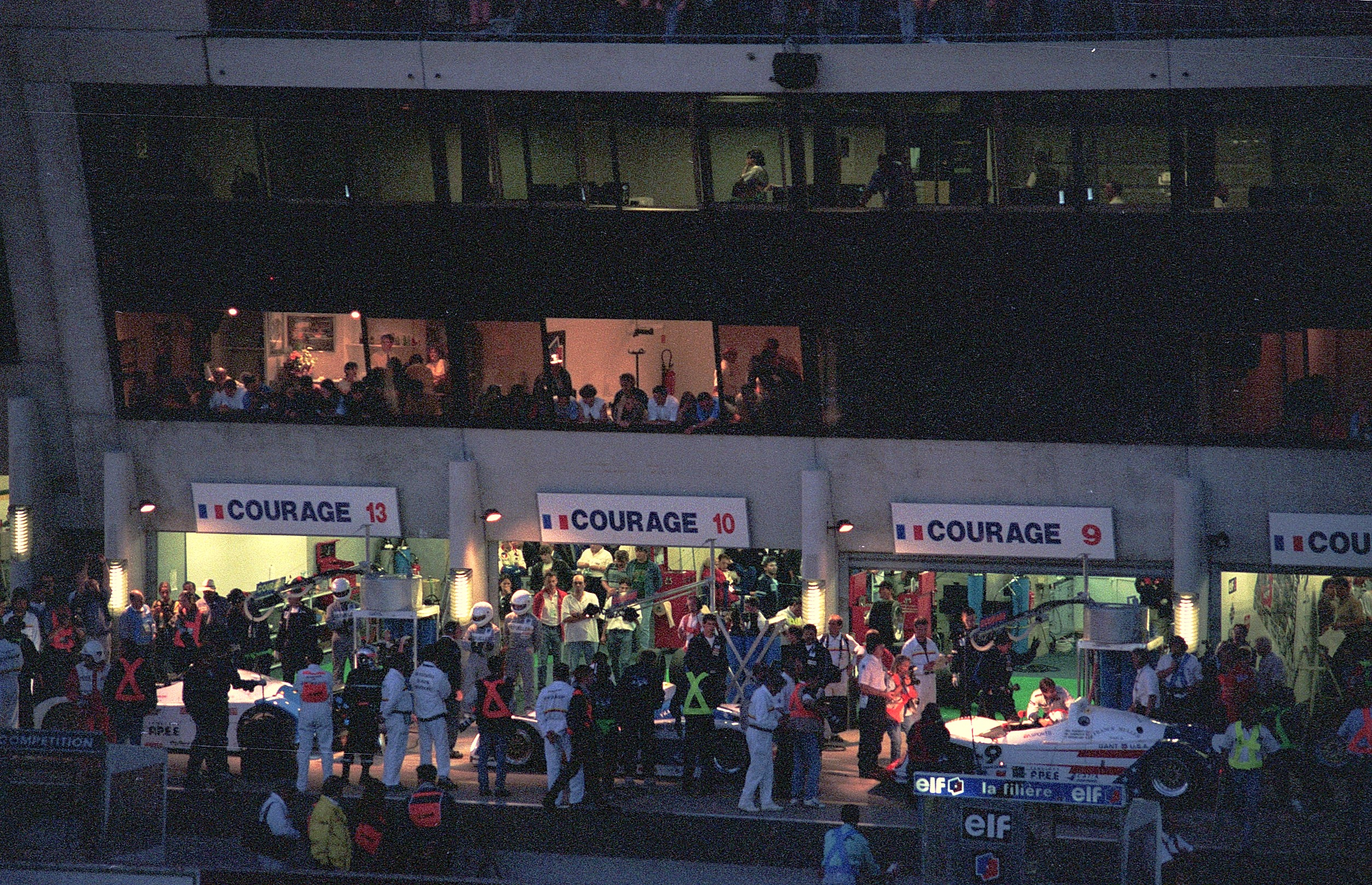
Evening activity in the Courage pits

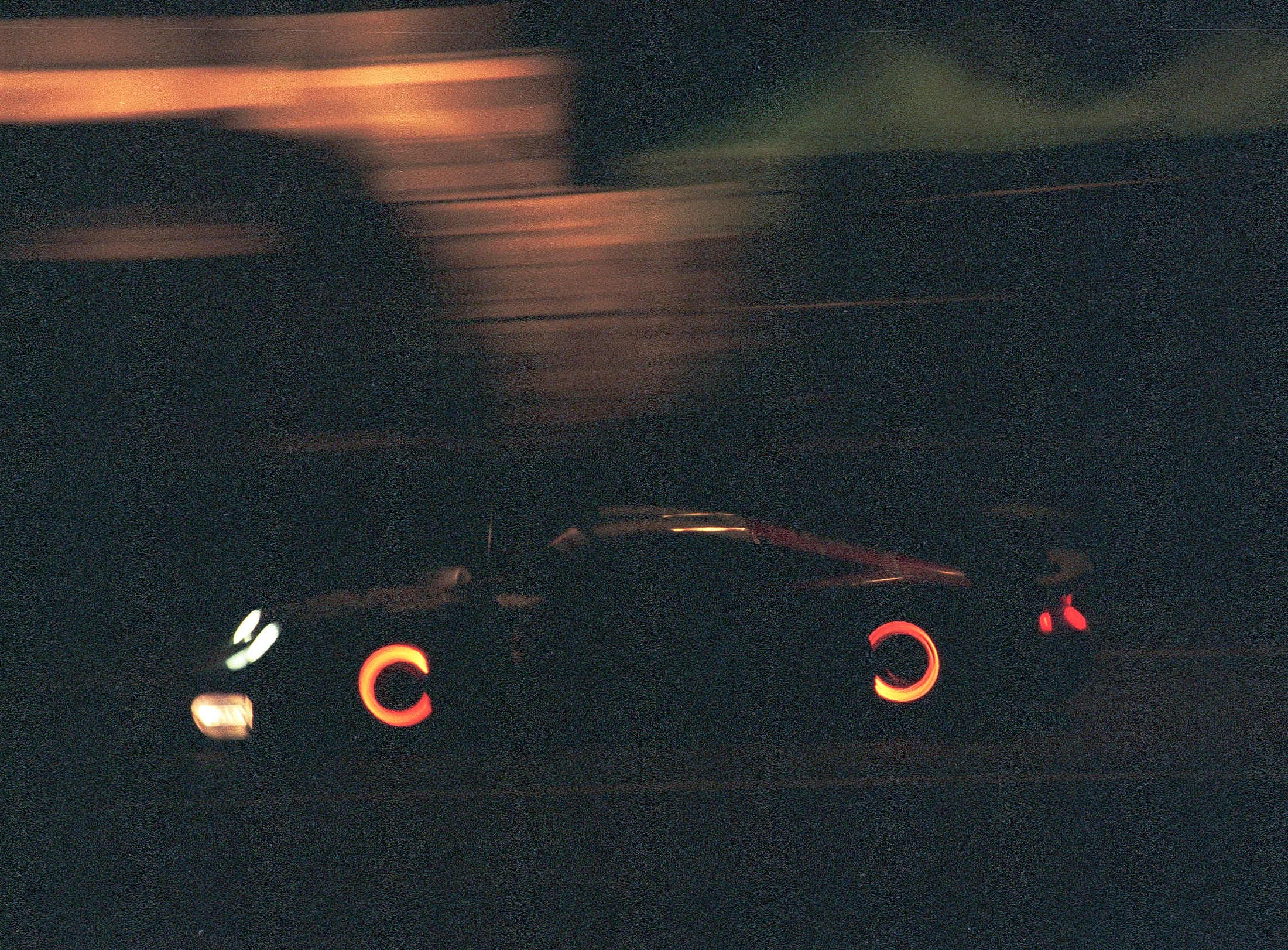
Porsche 911 GT1 braking at the Dunlop Chicane

Going into the night, the two works Porsches continued to hold a strong 1–2 lead, with the senior team still in front. In GT2, the ORECA Viper held the advantage, only losing the lead in the early darkness to the pursuing Roock and Haberthur Porsches at the fuel-stops. During the night, it steadily built its lead, (running as high as 12th overall) and by dawn had a comfortable 6-lap margin over the Haberthur Porsche. Then the team lost 40 minutes in the pits repairing ignition problems.

Around 3am, two of the Panoz cars went out of the race. After early transmission issues, the Brabham/Bundy/McCarthy DPR car had run fast and was about to break into the top-10 when a major engine fire on the Mulsanne Straight forced McCarthy to park and make a quick exit. Within the hour, the DAMS car was out with a terminal oil leak. The two delayed Nissans also went out in the small hours of the night, their gearboxes finally failing. At a similar time, the third car had its gearbox replaced while running 9th but doggedly soldiered on. At the halfway mark, despite hard driving the TWR had slipped a lap behind the Porsches. The two Gulf McLarens were close by with the Ravaglia BMW-McLaren in 6th. Next, it was the two new teams, Schübel and JB running cautious races, that were the best placed customer Porsches, in 7th and 8th, with the other BMW McLaren and the Momo Ferrari rounding out the top-10.

=== Morning ===
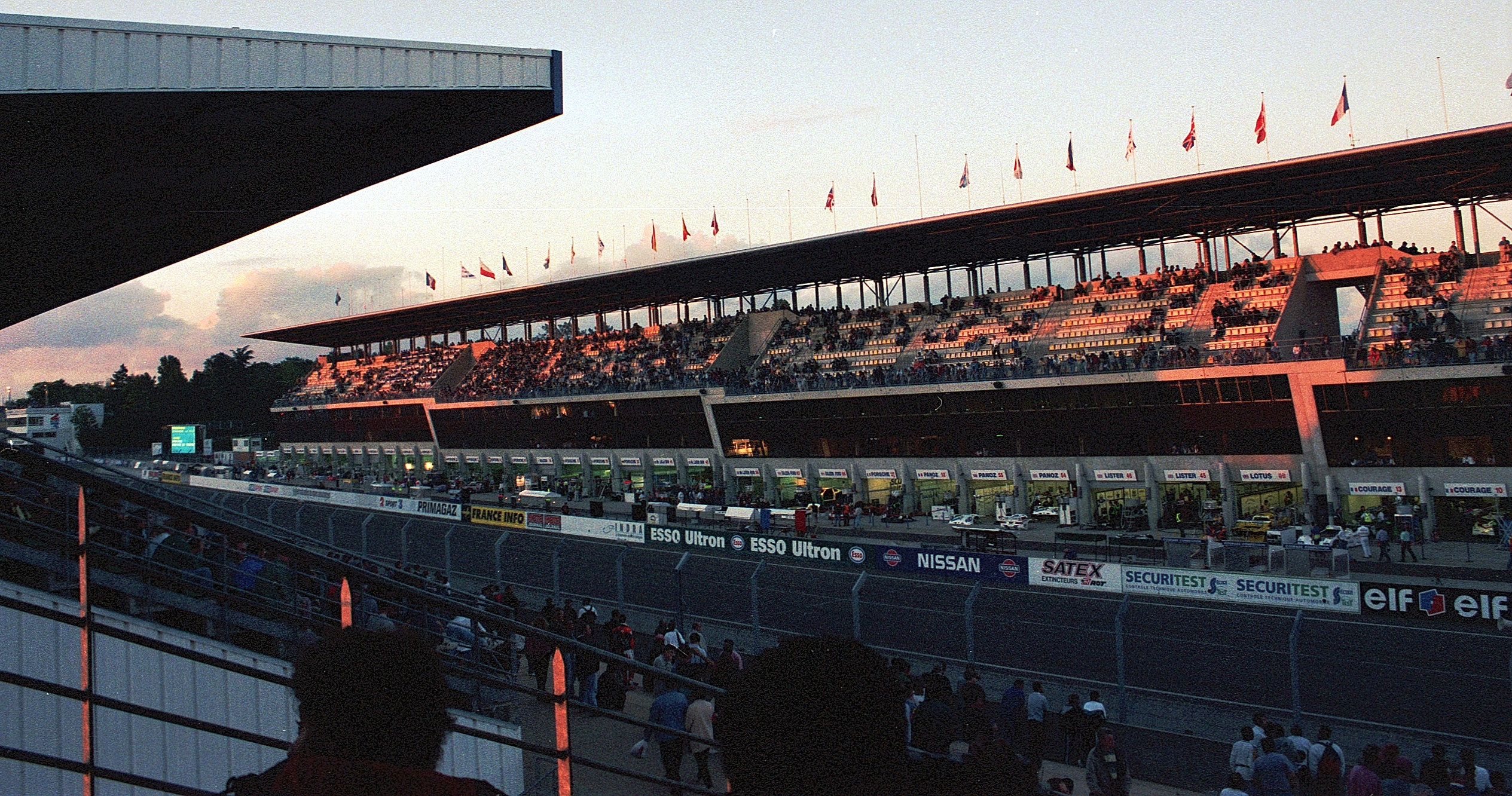
Dawn on the pit straight grandstands

The Porsches had kept their lead through the night. By breakfast time at 7am, they had completed 226 laps, and now with a 2-lap advantage over the TWR and the GTC McLaren, the BMW-McLaren (223) and Bellm's car (222). Still running in close formation, at 7.45 Wollek made an uncharacteristic error. Chased by Dalmas, he went off at Arnage hitting the kerb hard, breaking a driveline joint. The damage was such that he ground to a halt in the Porsche Curves.

"I don’t really know what happened, I was trying to outpower a GTC McLaren and I ran right on the kerb and started to slide. All of a sudden, I spun. I don’t know if it was my mistake or if the driveshaft broke."

The JB Racing Porsche had been running well through the night until 8am, when Olivier Thévenin suffered a blown engine while running 8th. He pulled over at the Mulsanne corner, where marshals put out the resultant flash fire. A bad hour for Porsche continued when the Kremer car was put out by an overheating engine. The car had been the best-placed of the customer Porsches at the start of the race, consistently running in the top-10 before nightfall. In the next hour, Lehto also spun at Arnage, clouting the barrier. Since their delay from overheating in the first hours of the race the three drivers had been thrashing the BMW McLaren with nothing to lose. After 15 hours they had got back up to 7th overall, but Lehto's accident spelled the end of their charge. Through improving familiarity with the car, Johansson and Kristensen stayed in contention with the Porsche, never letting them relax. In fact, Kristensen did a monster quadruple-stint in the dawn light on one set of tyres, that included setting the fastest lap of the race.

All this left Dalmas with a 2-minute lead over the TVR and through the morning extended that to put a lap back over them. At 10am, they had done 271 laps. Likewise, the GTC McLaren of Gounon, Raphanel and Olofsson, in third (269), and the BMW car of Kox/Ravaglia/Hélary (268) kept in touch with the TWR. The McLarens were not on the pace of the Porsches and had had to be driven hard to keep up, albeit helped by getting a longer 14 laps per shift. Five laps back was Ray Bellm GTC McLaren (266) with the privateer Schübel Porsche in sixth (263). With the Viper getting repairs in the pits, the Haberthur Porsche took up the GT2 lead, until at 8.50am an unusual event thwarted them: as Martinolle came into the Ford Chicane, the left-rear wheel parted company with the chassis, 20 minutes after its last pit stop. It was fortunate he was so close to the pits so only 7 minutes were lost. The lead passed to Eichmann in the leading Roock car but in the race of attrition, they in turn blew both turbos. The recovering Haberthur moved back up to the lead. Late in the morning, the last of the three Panoz cars retired. It had just got into the top-10, at 10.15am, when Leitzinger radioed in about another broken Ford engine.

=== Finish and post-race ===
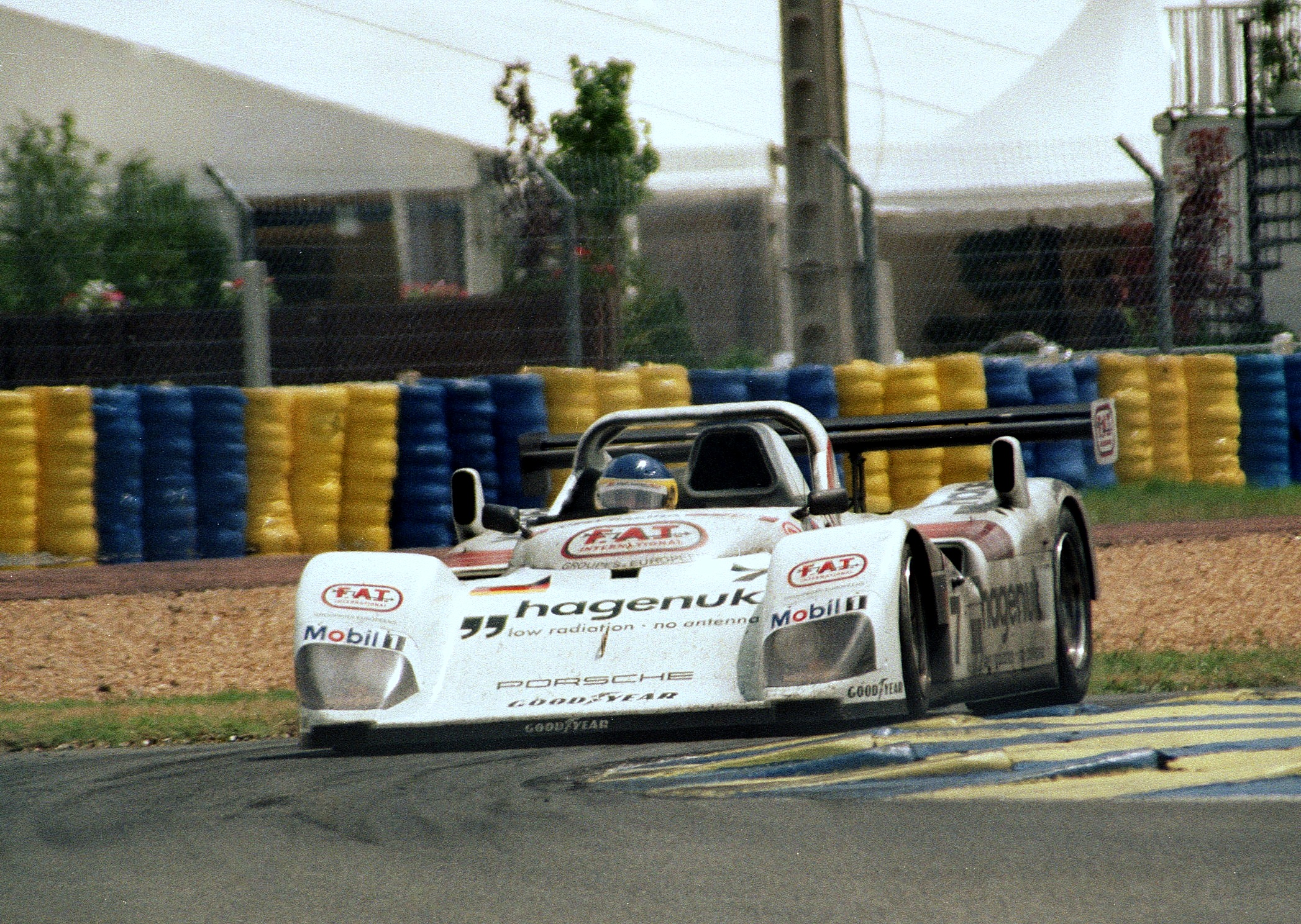
The winning #7 TWR WSC-95 coming into the Ford Chicane

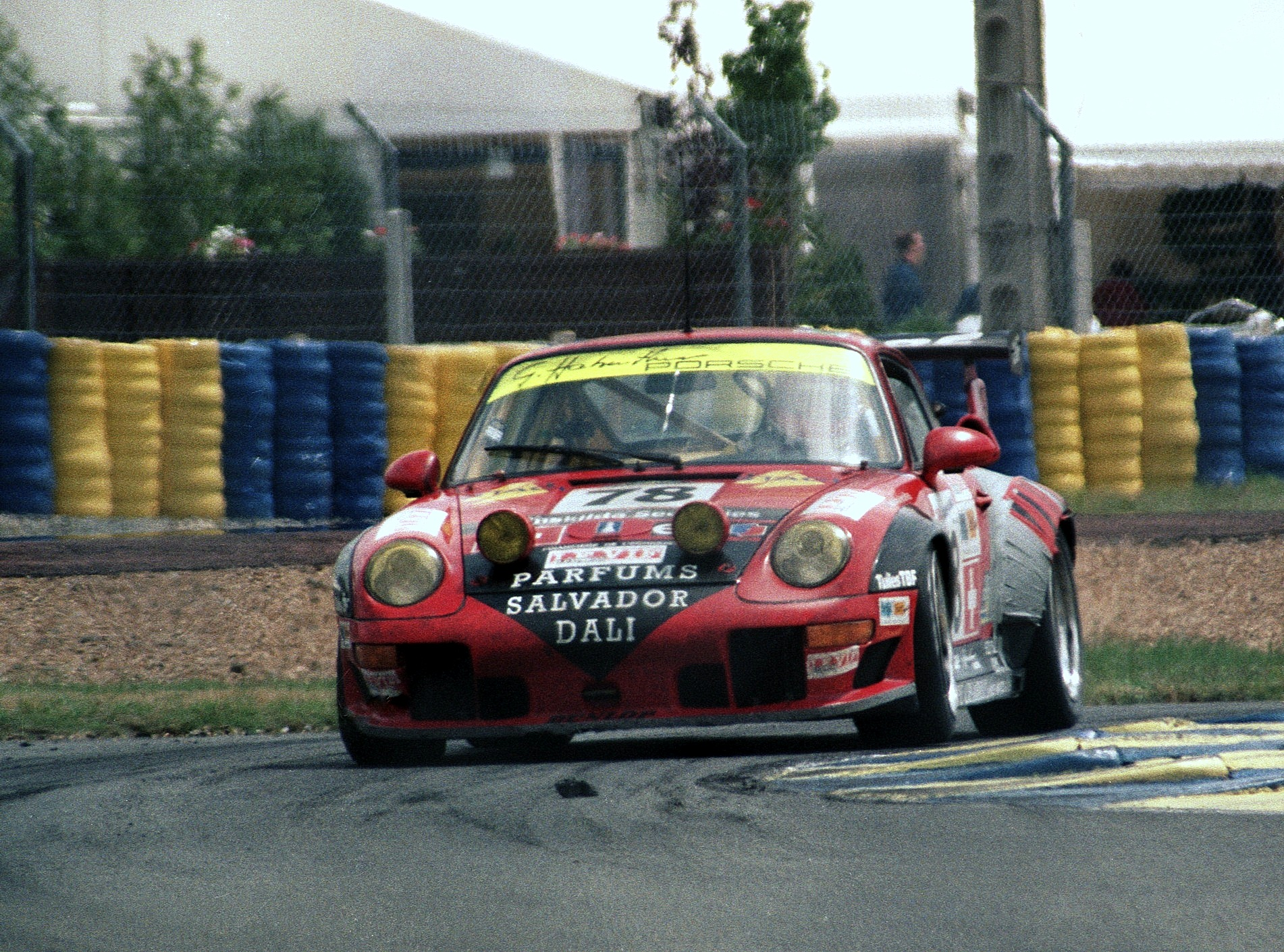
Class winner: the Elf Haberthur Porsche 993 GT2

The sun finally broke through after midday. For six hours, the Porsche had led, still with over a lap in hand. Then at 1.45, Kelleners suddenly slowed on the Hunaudières straight on his out-lap, reporting the gearbox seizing up and that he was heading for the pits. But just as he crested the Mulsanne hump, he pulled off the track and hurriedly got out. A dramatic fire engulfed the engine bay caused by a transmission oil-leak. Just minutes later, Andrew Gilbert-Scott also had a fire break out, at virtually the same spot, parking the second GTC McLaren at Mulsanne corner and making a quick exit. Despite a breakfast-time 4-minute stop/go penalty for repeated pitlane speeding, the team had been on-course for a 4-place finish. This left the rookie Kristensen with a comfortable lead in the TWR-Porsche, and without pressure the team could ease off. At the final pit stop, Alboreto took over for the run to the flag and the team won with a 1-lap margin. The McLarens likewise stayed trouble-free to come home second and third.

It was then a very long 22-lap gap to the rest of the field, all of whom had suffered considerable problems. Fourth was the Courage-Vaillant of Cottaz/Policand/Goossens, whose race had been compromised by a recalcitrant Porsche engine that kept failing to restart after its pitstops. The issue was resolved by the team physiotherapist offering a painkiller cold-spray to the starter motor. The Schübel Porsche was fifth after a very conservative race, carefully nursing a water leak for the latter half of the race. Sixth place was the Momo Ferrari, 40 laps behind. They had been delayed by having to replace the alternator twice. That third alternator had come from the Pilot Ferrari, retired on early Saturday evening when Ferté ran out of fuel when the reserve tank failed. The Scuderia Italia Porsche had lost an hour during the night with a gearbox change. From 20th, they had risen back up to 8th until delayed mid-morning when Pescatori went off at Arnage, damaging the suspension. With other retirements they eventually made it back up to finish 8th. One of the Nissans did make it to the finish, coming home in 12th after its long climb back up the field during the night following two gearbox changes. In GT2, the Haberthur Porsche held off the hard-charging Roock car to finish a lap ahead. In a torrid race for the class of 16 cars, only six cars finished. Beretta had crashed his Viper with just two hours to go, trying to make up lost time. His teammates finished a distant fifth in class, almost 30 laps behind with the Chamberlain Viper coming 6th, and last, in class. Even at the tail of the strung-out field, the cars kept chasing – the final Courage had lost several hours early on Saturday with a malfunctioning throttle. Running at the back of the field thereafter, they persisted and in the last hour finally caught up and passed the ailing Kudzu. After a number of issues with the front suspension during the night, a rear wishbone failure (the fourth) in the final hour saw the Kudzu have the ignominy of finishing last for the second year in a row, although at least finishing. Jim Downing wryly observed that he'd have likely won the award for the most pitstops in the race.

Yet again, the Porsche GT1 had been thwarted for a Le Mans victory. And yet again it was TWR-Porsche WSC95 chassis 001 that beat them to the post, giving Joest Racing a unique double of twice now winning back-to-back Le Mans with the same car (having done it previously in 1984–5 with its #7 Porsche 956, when it had also beaten the works Porsche team). AMG-Mercedes had entered the GT Championship but chose not to race at Le Mans. Winning 6 of the 8 races after Le Mans with the new CLK, they claimed the inaugural World GT Championship title for Bernd Schneider. Lehto and Soper shared second bit in the face of the might of Porsche and Mercedes-Benz, BMW and McLaren retired from the Championship.

== Official results ==
=== Finishers ===
Results taken from Quentin Spurring's book, officially licensed by the ACO
Class Winners are in Bold text.

Pos	Class	No.	Team	Drivers	Chassis	Engine	Tyre	Laps
1	**LM-P875***	**7**	**(Germany) Joest Racing**	**(Italy) Michele Alboreto** **(Sweden) Stefan Johansson** **(Denmark) Tom Kristensen**	TWR-Porsche WSC95	Porsche 935/76 3.0L F6 twin turbo	G	361
2	**LM-GT1**	**41**	**(United Kingdom) GTC/Gulf Team Davidoff**	**(France) Pierre-Henri Raphanel** **(France) Jean-Marc Gounon** **(Sweden) Anders Olofsson**	McLaren F1 GTR	BMW S70/3 6.1L V12	M	360
3	LM-GT1	43	(Germany) Team Schnitzer (Germany) BMW Motorsport	(Italy) Roberto Ravaglia (Netherlands) Peter Kox (France) Éric Hélary	McLaren F1 GTR	BMW S70/3 6.1L V12	M	358
4	LM-P875	13	(France) Courage Compétition	(France) Didier Cottaz (France) Jérôme Policand (Belgium) Marc Goossens	Courage C41	Porsche 935/82 3.0L F6 twin turbo	M	336
5	LM-GT1	33	(Germany) Schübel Rennsport (private entrant)	(Portugal) Pedro Lamy (Germany) Armin Hahne (France) Patrice Goueslard	Porsche 911 GT1	Porsche 9R1 3.2L F6 twin turbo	M	331
6	LM-P875	3	(Italy) Momo Racing	(Italy) Gianpiero Moretti (Belgium) Didier Theys (Italy) Max Papis	Ferrari 333 SP	Ferrari F130E 4.0L V12	Y	321
7	LM-P875	8	(France) La Filière Elf	(France) Henri Pescarolo (France) Jean-Philippe Belloc (France) Emmanuel Clérico	Courage C36	Porsche 935/76 3.0L F6 twin turbo	M	319
8	LM-GT1	27	(Italy) BMS Scuderia Italia	(Italy) Pierluigi Martini (Italy) Christian Pescatori (Brazil) Antonio de Azevedo Herrmann	Porsche 911 GT1	Porsche 9R1 3.2L F6 twin turbo	P	317
9	**LM-GT2**	**78**	**(Switzerland) Elf Haberthur Racing** (private entrant)	**(Belgium) Michel Neugarten** **(France) Guy Martinolle** **(France) Jean-Claude Lagniez**	Porsche 911 GT2	Porsche M64/81 3.6L F6 twin turbo	D	307
10	LM-GT2	74	(Germany) Roock Racing Team	(Switzerland) Bruno Eichmann (Germany) André Ahrlé (United States) Andy Pilgrim	Porsche 911 GT2	Porsche M64/81 3.6L F6 twin turbo	M	306
11	LM-GT2 *	73	(Germany) Roock Racing Team	(Portugal) Manuel Mello-Breyner (Portugal) Tomas Mello-Breyner (Portugal) Pedro Mello-Breyner	Porsche 911 GT2	Porsche M64/81 3.6L F6 twin turbo	M	295
12	LM-GT1	23	(Japan) NISMO (United Kingdom) Tom Walkinshaw Racing	(Japan) Kazuyoshi Hoshino (Japan) Masahiko Kageyama (France) Érik Comas	Nissan R390 GT1	Nissan VRH35L 3.5L V8 twin turbo	B	294
13	LM-GT2	80	(Switzerland) GT Racing Team (private entrant)	(Germany) Claudia Hürtgen (United Kingdom) John Robinson (United Kingdom) Hugh Price	Porsche 911 GT2	Porsche M64/81 3.6L F6 twin turbo	M	287
14	LM-GT2	63	(France) Viper Team ORECA	(United Kingdom) Justin Bell (United States) John Morton (France) Pierre Yver	Chrysler Viper GTS-R	Chrysler 356-T6 8.0L V10	M	278
15	LM-GT2	64	(United Kingdom) Chamberlain Engineering	(Netherlands) Hans Hugenholtz Jr (Finland) Jari Nurminen (United States) Chris Gleason	Chrysler Viper GTS-R	Chrysler 356-T6 8.0L V10	G	269
16	LM-P875	10	(France) Courage Compétition	(Sweden) Fredrik Ekblom (France) Jean-Louis Ricci (Belgium) Jean-Paul Libert	Courage C36	Porsche 935/76 3.0L F6 twin turbo	M	265
17	LM-P875	15	(Japan) Mazdaspeed (United States) Team DTR	(Japan) Yojiro Terada (United States) Jim Downing (France) Franck Fréon	Kudzu DLM4	Mazda R26B 2.6L quad-rotor	G	263

=== Did not finish ===
Pos	Class	No	Team	Drivers	Chassis	Engine	Tyre	Laps	Reason
DNF	LM-GT1	26	(Germany) Porsche AG	(France) Yannick Dalmas (France) Emmanuel Collard (Germany) Ralf Kelleners	Porsche 911 GT1 Evo	Porsche 9R1 3.2L F6 twin turbo	M	327	Fire (23hr)
DNF	LM-GT1 *	39	(United Kingdom) GTC/Gulf Team Davidoff	(United Kingdom) Ray Bellm (United Kingdom) Andrew Gilbert-Scott (Japan) Masanori Sekiya	McLaren F1 GTR 97	BMW S70/3 6.1L V12	M	326	Fire (23hr)
DNF	LM-GT2	61	(France) Viper Team ORECA	(Monaco) Olivier Beretta (France) Philippe Gache (France) Dominique Dupuy	Chrysler Viper GTS-R	Chrysler 356-T6 8.0L V10	M	263	Accident (23hr)
DNF	LM-GT1 *	25	(Germany) Porsche AG	(Germany) Hans-Joachim Stuck (France) Bob Wollek (Belgium) Thierry Boutsen	Porsche 911 GT1 Evo	Porsche 9R1 3.2L F6 twin turbo	G	238	Accident (17hr)
DNF	LM-GT1	54	(United Kingdom) David Price Racing	(United Kingdom) Andy Wallace (United Kingdom) James Weaver (United States) Butch Leitzinger	Panoz Esperante GTR-1	Ford 6.0L V8	G	236	Engine (19hr)
DNF	LM-GT1	42	(Germany) Team Schnitzer (Germany) BMW Motorsport	(Finland) JJ Lehto (United Kingdom) Steve Soper (Brazil) Nelson Piquet	McLaren F1 GTR	BMW S70/3 6.1L V12	M	236	Accident (18hr)
DNF	LM-GT1	29	(France) JB Racing (private entrant)	(France) Alain Ferté (Germany) Jürgen von Gartzen (France) Olivier Thévenin	Porsche 911 GT1	Porsche 9R1 3.2L F6 twin turbo	M	236	Engine/Fire (17hr)
DNF	LM-GT1	30	(Germany) Kremer Racing	(France) Christophe Bouchut (United States) Andy Evans (Belgium) Bertrand Gachot	Porsche 911 GT1	Porsche 9R1 3.2L F6 twin turbo	G	207	Engine (17hr)
DNF	LM-GT2 *	75	(France) Larbre Compétition	(France) Patrick Bourdais (United States) Peter Kitchak (Brazil) André Lara Resende	Porsche 911 GT2	Porsche M64/81 3.6L F6 twin turbo	M	205	Accident (21hr)
DNF	LM-P875	9	(France) Courage Compétition	(United States) Mario Andretti (United States) Michael Andretti (France) Olivier Grouillard	Courage C36	Porsche 935/76 3.0L F6 twin turbo	M	197	Accident (17hr)
DNF	LM-GT1	52	(France) DAMS	(France) Franck Lagorce (France) Éric Bernard (France) Jean-Christophe Boullion	Panoz Esperante GTR-1	Ford 6.0L V8	M	149	Engine (12hr)
DNF	LM-GT1	55	(United Kingdom) David Price Racing	(United States) Harry "Doc" Bundy (Australia) David Brabham (United Kingdom) Perry McCarthy	Panoz Esperante GTR-1	Ford 6.0L V8	G	145	Fire (12hr)
DNF	LM-GT1	21	(Japan) NISMO (United Kingdom) Tom Walkinshaw Racing	(United Kingdom) Martin Brundle (Germany) Jörg Müller (South Africa) Wayne Taylor	Nissan R390 GT1	Nissan VRH35L 3.5L V8 twin turbo	B	139	Gearbox (13hr)
DNF	LM-GT1	28	(Germany) Konrad Motorsport	(Austria) Franz Konrad (Italy) Mauro Baldi (United Kingdom) Robert Nearn	Porsche 911 GT1	Porsche 9R1 3.2L F6 twin turbo	P	138	Accident (11hr)
DNF	LM-GT2	67	(United States) Saleen-Allen Speedlab	(United States) Steve Saleen (United States) Price Cobb (Spain) Carlos Palau	Saleen Mustang RRR	Ford 5.9L V8	D	133	Suspension (17hr)
DNF	LM-GT2	79	(Germany) Konrad Motorsport	(Switzerland) Toni Seiler (France) Michel Ligonnet (United States) Larry Schumacher	Porsche 911 GT2	Porsche M64/81 3.6L F6 twin turbo	P	126	Engine (11hr)
DNF	LM-GT1	22	(Japan) NISMO (United Kingdom) Tom Walkinshaw Racing	(Italy) Riccardo Patrese (Belgium) Eric van de Poele (Japan) Aguri Suzuki	Nissan R390 GT1	Nissan VRH35L 3.5L V8 twin turbo	B	121	Gearbox (13hr)
DNF	LM-GT1	49	(United Kingdom) GT1 Lotus Racing	(Netherlands) Jan Lammers (Netherlands) Mike Hezemans (Germany) Alexander Grau	Lotus Elise GT1	Chevrolet LT5 6.0L V8	M	121	Engine (11hr)
DNF	LM-P875	5	(Germany) Kremer Racing	(Spain) Tomás Saldaña (Sweden) Carl Rosenblad (Germany) Jürgen Lässig	Kremer K8	Porsche 935/76 3.0L F6 twin turbo	G	103	Engine (8hr)
DNF	LM-GT2	84	(Switzerland) Stadler Motorsport	(Switzerland) Enzo Calderari (Switzerland) Lilian Bryner (Italy) Angelo Zadra	Porsche 911 GT2	Porsche M64/81 3.6L F6 twin turbo	P	98	Engine (10hr)
DNF	LM-GT1	44	(Japan) Team Lark (United Kingdom) Parabolica Motorsport	(United Kingdom) Gary Ayles (Japan) Keiichi Tsuchiya (Japan) Akihiko Nakaya	McLaren F1 GTR 97	BMW S70/3 6.1L V12	M	88	Accident (7hr)
DNF	LM-GT1	46	(United Kingdom) Newcastle United Lister Cars	(United Kingdom) Julian Bailey (Brazil) Thomas Erdos (Australia) Mark Skaife	Lister Storm GTL	Jaguar HE 7.0L V12	D	77	Gearbox (10hr)
DNF	LM-GT2	77	(France) Chéreau Sports (France) Larbre Compétition	(France) Jean-Luc Chéreau (France) Jack Leconte (France) Jean-Pierre Jarier	Porsche 911 GT2	Porsche M64/81 3.6L F6 twin turbo	M	77	Transmission (8hr)
DNF	LM-GT2	62	(France) Viper Team ORECA	(United States) Tommy Archer (Belgium) Marc Duez (France) Soheil Ayari	Chrysler Viper GTS-R	Chrysler 356-T6 8.0L V10	M	76	Accident (6hr)
DNF	LM-GT2	60	(United Kingdom) / (Italy) Agusta Racing Team	(Italy) Riccardo “Rocky” Agusta (Italy) Almo Coppelli (France) Éric Graham	Callaway Corvette LM-GT	Chevrolet LT5 6.0L V8	D	45	Out of fuel (5hr)
DNF	LM-GT2	66	(United States) Saleen-Allen Speedlab	(United Kingdom) David Warnock (United Kingdom) Rob Schirle (United Kingdom) Allen Lloyd	Saleen Mustang RRR	Ford 5.9L V8	D	28	Electrics (10hr)
DNF	LM-GT1	45	(United Kingdom) Newcastle United Lister Cars	(United Kingdom) Geoff Lees (United Kingdom) Tiff Needell (South Africa) George Fouché	Lister Storm GTL	Jaguar HE 7.0L V12	D	21	Accident (3hr)
DNF	LM-P875	4	(France) Ferté Pilot Racing (private entrant)	(France) Michel Ferté (Spain) Adrián Campos (United States) Charlie Nearburg	Ferrari 333 SP	Ferrari F130E 4.0L V12	D	18	Out of fuel (4hr)
DNF	LM-GT2	70	(United Kingdom) Team Marcos Racing; International	(Netherlands) Cor Euser (Germany) Harald Becker (Japan) Takaji Suzuki	Marcos Mantara 600LM	Chevrolet LT5 5.9L V8	D	15	Engine (3hr)
DNF	LM-GT1	32	(Germany) Roock Racing Team	(United Kingdom) Allan McNish (Austria) Karl Wendlinger (Monaco) Stéphane Ortelli	Porsche 911 GT1	Porsche 9R1 3.2L F6 twin turbo	M	8	Accident (2hr)
DNF	LM-P875	14	(United Kingdom) Pacific Racing	(Finland) Harri Toivonen (Chile) Eliseo Salazar (Spain) Jesús Pareja	BRM P301	Nissan VG30DETT 3.0L V6 twin turbo	P	6	Engine (1hr)

=== Did not start ===
Pos	Class	No	Team	Drivers	Chassis	Engine	Tyre	Reason
DNS	LM-GT1	40	(United Kingdom) GTC/Gulf Team Davidoff	(Germany) Thomas Bscher (Denmark) John Nielsen (United Kingdom) Chris Goodwin	McLaren F1 GTR 97	BMW S70/3 6.1L V12	**M**	Fire during Practice
DNQ	LM-P875	6	(Germany) Kremer Racing	(Italy) Giovanni Lavaggi (France) Jean-Luc Maury-Laribière (France) Bernard Chauvin	Kremer K8	Porsche 935/76 3.0L F6 twin turbo	**G**	Practice accident
DNQ	LM-GT1	50	(United Kingdom) GT1 Lotus Racing	(France) Fabien Giroix (Switzerland) Jean-Denis Delétraz (Thailand) Ratanakul Prutirat	Lotus Elise GT1	Chevrolet LT5 6.0L V8	**M**	Did not qualify
DNQ	LM-GT2	71	(United Kingdom) Team Marcos Racing; International	(France) François Migault (United Kingdom) Dominic Chappell (France) Henri-Louis Maunior	Marcos Mantara 600LM	Chevrolet LT5 5.9L V8	**D**	Did not qualify
WD	LM P650 *	2	(France) Welter Racing	(France) Marc Rostan (France) Sébastien Enjolras	WR LM97	Peugeot 405-Raid 2.0L S4 turbo		Withdrawn

- Note *: one of the six “Automatic Entries” awarded by the ACO.

=== Class winners ===
Class	Winning Car	Winning Drivers
LM-P875	#7 TWR-Porsche WSC95	Alboreto / Johansson / Kristensen
LM-GT1	#41 McLaren F1 GTR	Gounon / Raphanel / Olofsson
LM-GT2	#78 Porsche 911 GT2	Neugarten / Martinoll / Lagniez

== Statistics ==
Taken from Quentin Spurring's book, officially licensed by the ACO

- Pole Position – M. Alboreto, #7 TWR-Porsche WSC95 - 3:41.6; 221.0 km/h (137.3 mph)
- Fastest Lap – T. Kristensen, #7 TWR-Porsche WSC95 – 3:45.1; 217.5 km/h (135.1 mph)
- Winning Distance – 4,909.6 km (3,050.7 mi)
- Winner's Average Speed – 204.2 km/h (126.9 mph)
- Attendance - 170000
