= 1992 World Sportscar Championship =

Racing tournament

Seasons
- ← 1991 none →

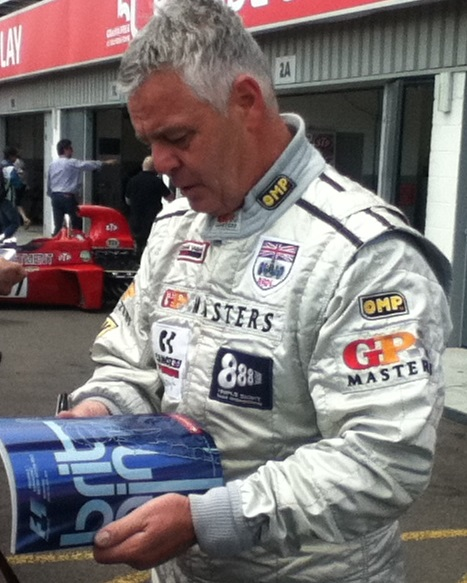
Derek Warwick (pictured in 2014) and Yannick Dalmas won the Drivers' World Championship for 1992

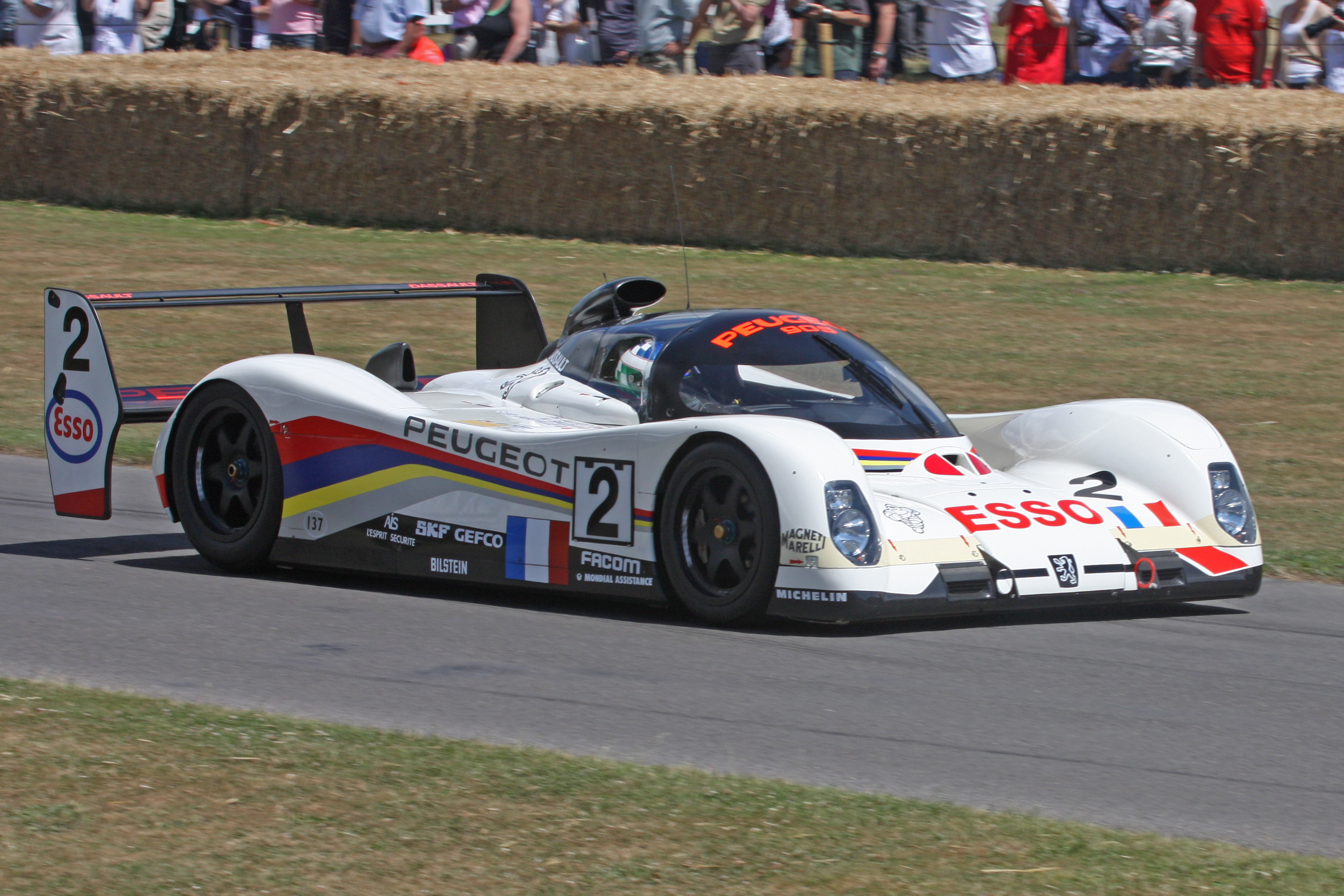
Peugeot Talbot Sport won the Teams' World Championship with the Peugeot 905

The 1992 Sportscar World Championship season was the 40th and final season of FIA World Sportscar Championship motor racing. It featured the 1992 FIA Sportscar World Championship, which was contested over a six race series which ran from 26 April to 18 October 1992. The championship was open to Group C Sportscars.

The Drivers Championship was won jointly by Yannick Dalmas and Derek Warwick and the Teams Championship by Peugeot Talbot Sport. The FIA Cup for Drivers was awarded to Ferdinand de Lesseps and the FIA Cup for Teams to Chamberlain Engineering.

== Pre-season ==
From the start, the 1992 season was in doubt. The FIA planned to cancel the season due to a lack of entrants, as was announced by Max Mosley, new President of the FIA, at a meeting held in London on 11 November 1991, but pressure from Peugeot, who had poured a large sum of money into the design and build of their 905 model and did not wish to see that money wasted after only a year of competition, convinced the FIA that there would be enough entries to make the season worthwhile. The "rebirth" of the championship was announced at the FIA World council on 5 December 1991. With this, the FIA allowed the season to move forward, though with few participants.

The FIA's vision of a single unified formula for the Sportscar World Championship that would truly equal that of Formula One was finally into place following the development of 3500 cc sportscars in the previous seasons. This formula of engine equalisation took over the series, eliminating any previous engine that did not fit into the 3.5 L category. Thus every car had similar engines, and new subclasses were born: C1 for works supported teams with engines of 10 or 12 cylinders and usually backed by factory teams, and FIA Cup for privateer teams, usually running the Ford Cosworth DFR V8. FIA Cup cars were required to conform with Group C regulations with the exceptions of a lower prescribed minimum weight (700 kg v 750 kg), a limitation on engine revolutions and the prohibition of carbon disc brakes.

With the elimination of the previous C2 class, it required manufacturers such as Mazda and Porsche to build entirely new engines, and due to the large change in engine dimensions compared to what they had used in 1991, all new chassis as well. Porsche already had an F1 engine in their 3512 unit used by Footwork, but the engine design was found to be lacking. Porsche, suffering financially at the time, decided that it was no longer worth not only improving the 3512, but also replacing the 962 chassis, and decided not to return.

Mazda, having accomplished their goal of winning the 24 Hours of Le Mans in 1991 with their famed rotary engine, were left without the ability to use their rotary engine anymore in 1992. Since Mazda entered sportscar racing mostly to push their rotary designs, Mazda decided to continue on into 1992 for advancement of the overall brand, but with a less ambitious development programme. Mazdaspeed bought customer versions of the Jaguar XJR-14 and slightly modified them into the Mazda MXR-01 while the engines were customer Judd GV V10s. This effort saved large amounts of money for the company while keeping their name involved in the sport.

Of the teams that already had compliant 3.5 L cars racing in 1991, their continuation into 1992 varied.

Mercedes-Benz, alongside partner Sauber, pushed ahead with plans for a car in 1992. Development of the C292 was underway, as was construction of a new set of Flat-12s. However, after various faults in the construction of the engines in 1991, further problems led to large monetary losses for the company, forcing them not to return for 1992.

Jaguar, who had been in sportscar racing with the XJR project since 1985, and were not completely happy with the performance of the XJR-14 during the 1991 season, had already announced their departure from the series. Customer XJR-14s were promised for 1992 from newcomers RMR racing as well as Gee Pee Cars but the entries never materialised.

Of the smaller privateer teams, Brun Motorsport's development of the lacking C91 chassis cost them a great deal, and with the loss of cheap customer cars like the Porsche 962, they decided not to return. Other teams which had previously used the 962 also failed to return, including Kremer Racing and Team Salamin Primagaz. Courage Compétition was unable to find the money to continue development of their own chassis, and decided to instead concentrate solely on the 24 Hours of Le Mans. Konrad Motorsport, whose KM-011 chassis was also lackluster in 1991, claimed they were attempting to push on with Lamborghini backing into 1992. Euro Racing found enough cash to replace their ageing Spice chassis with the new Lola T92/10s with Judd powerplants, and promised to be on the grid immediately for 1992. Chamberlain Engineering also planned to continue as the factory backed Spice Engineering squad.

Peugeot and Toyota, who had campaigned their 905 and TS010s respectively, remained in the sport mostly unchanged. Both cars underwent evolutionary changes in preparation for 1992, while the basic chassis and engines remained the same.

A revival of the BRM name was also announced for 1992, using their own newly built P351 chassis and V12 engine. Unfortunately, even with the apparent addition of BRM, the grid in comparison between 1991 and 1992 was looking bleak, with the loss of a large number of privateer teams, as well as the loss of two major manufacturers (with a third being downgraded to privateer status) with only one possible new replacement.

== Schedule ==
When the 1992 season was provisionally approved in December 1991, the FIA published a ten race calendar for the season, composed of 1000 km and 500 km races, as well as the 24 Hours of Le Mans.

=== Initial schedule ===
Rnd	Race	Circuit	Date
1	(Japan) 500 km of Autopolis	Autopolis	5 April
2	(Italy) 1000 km of Monza	Autodromo Nazionale Monza	26 April
3	(United Kingdom) 500 km of Silverstone	Silverstone Circuit	10 May
4	(Spain) 500 km of Jarama	Circuito Permanente Del Jarama	26 May
5	(France) 24 Hours of Le Mans	Circuit de la Sarthe	20 June; 21 June
6	(United Kingdom) 1000 km of Donington	Donington Park	19 July
7	(Germany) 1000 km of Nürburgring	Nürburgring	2 August
8	(Japan) 1000 km of Suzuka	Suzuka Circuit	30 August
9	1000 km of Mexico City	Autódromo Hermanos Rodríguez	13 September
10	(Spain) 1000 km of Jerez	Circuito Permanente de Jerez	4 October

By January 1992, the FIA shortened the calendar to eight events, with the Monza and Donington events being cut down to 500 km. Magny-Cours was also brought in to replace some fly-away events.

The Jerez round remained on the final calendar, but was cancelled during the middle of the season when track officials failed to update the track to the FIA's standards.

=== Final schedule ===
Rnd	Race	Circuit	Date
1	(Italy) Trofeo F. Caracciolo (500 km)	Autodromo Nazionale Monza	26 April
2	(United Kingdom) BRDC Empire Trophy (500 km)	Silverstone Circuit	10 May
3	(France) 24 Hours of Le Mans	Circuit de la Sarthe	20 June; 21 June
4	(United Kingdom) Triton Showers Trophy (500 km)	Donington Park	19 July
5	(Japan) Suzuka 1000km	Suzuka Circuit	30 August
6	(France) Championnat du Monde de Voitures de Sport (500 km)	Circuit de Nevers Magny-Cours	18 October

Prior to the BRDC Empire Trophy at Silverstone, race organisers attempted to convince teams to shorten the race distance to approximately 250 km in order to boost ticket sales. However, Toyota vetoed the decision and the race remained at its original distance.

== Entries ==
=== Group C1 ===
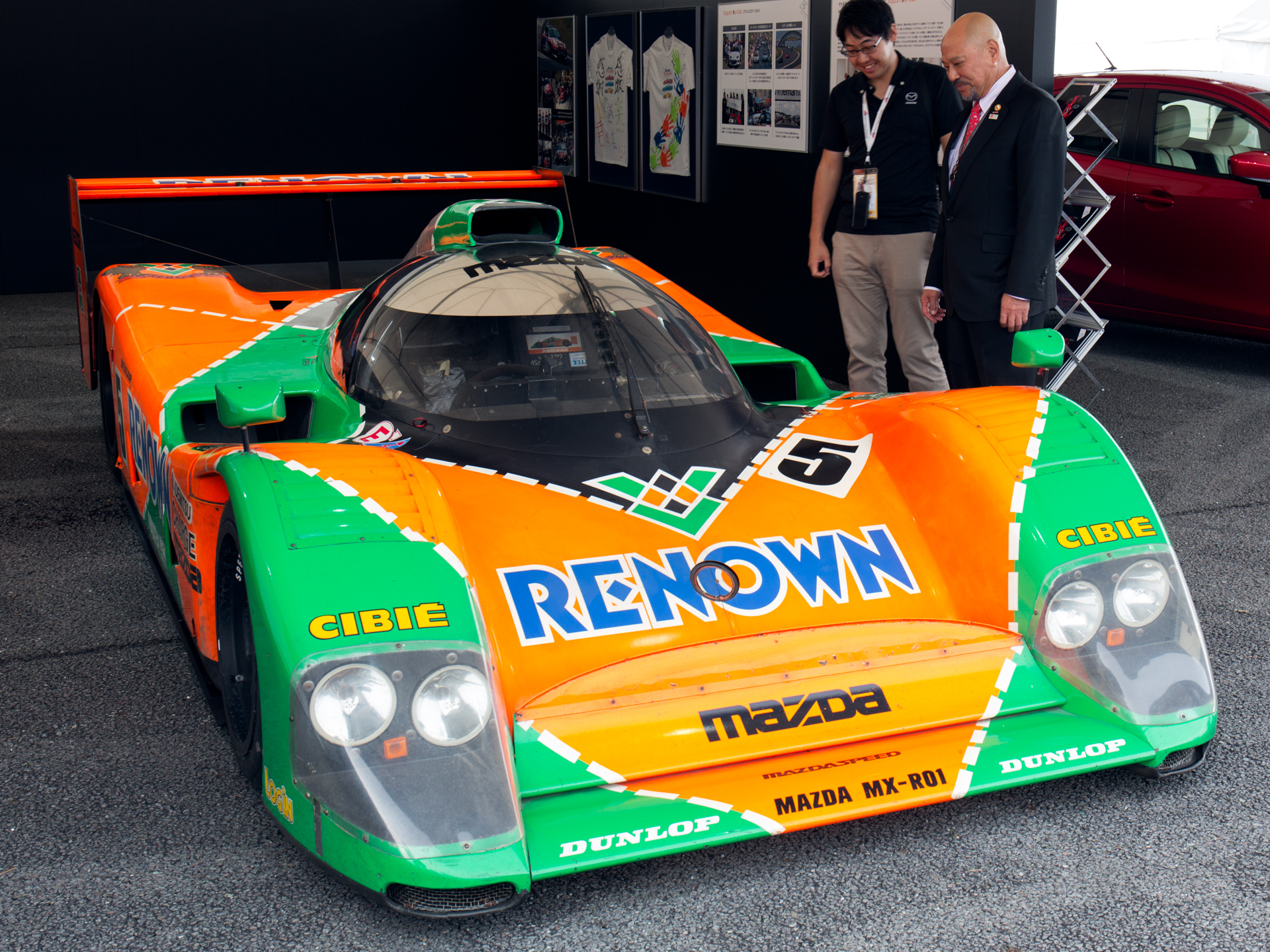
Mazda's MXR-01 with driver Yojiro Terada (right)

Entrant	Car	Engine	Tyre	No.	Drivers	Rounds
(France) Peugeot Talbot Sport	Peugeot 905 Evo 1 Bis	Peugeot SA35-A2 3.5 L V10	M	1	(United Kingdom) Derek Warwick	All
(France) Peugeot Talbot Sport	Peugeot 905 Evo 1 Bis	Peugeot SA35-A2 3.5 L V10	M	1	(France) Yannick Dalmas	All
(France) Peugeot Talbot Sport	Peugeot 905 Evo 1 Bis	Peugeot SA35-A2 3.5 L V10	M	1	(United Kingdom) Mark Blundell	3
(France) Peugeot Talbot Sport	Peugeot 905 Evo 1 Bis	Peugeot SA35-A2 3.5 L V10	M	2	(France) Philippe Alliot	All
(France) Peugeot Talbot Sport	Peugeot 905 Evo 1 Bis	Peugeot SA35-A2 3.5 L V10	M	2	(Italy) Mauro Baldi	All
(France) Peugeot Talbot Sport	Peugeot 905 Evo 1 Bis	Peugeot SA35-A2 3.5 L V10	M	2	(France) Jean-Pierre Jabouille	3
(France) Peugeot Talbot Sport	Peugeot 905 Evo 1 Bis	Peugeot SA35-A2 3.5 L V10	M	31	(France) Alain Ferté	3
(France) Peugeot Talbot Sport	Peugeot 905 Evo 1 Bis	Peugeot SA35-A2 3.5 L V10	M	31	(Austria) Karl Wendlinger	3
(France) Peugeot Talbot Sport	Peugeot 905 Evo 1 Bis	Peugeot SA35-A2 3.5 L V10	M	31	(Belgium) Eric van de Poele	3
(France) Peugeot Talbot Sport	Peugeot 905 Evo 1 Bis	Peugeot SA35-A2 3.5 L V10	M	71	(France) Éric Hélary	6
(France) Peugeot Talbot Sport	Peugeot 905 Evo 1 Bis	Peugeot SA35-A2 3.5 L V10	M	71	(France) Christophe Bouchut	6
(Netherlands) Euro Racing	Lola T92/10	Judd GV10 3.5 L V10	M	3	(Netherlands) Cor Euser	1–4
(Netherlands) Euro Racing	Lola T92/10	Judd GV10 3.5 L V10	M	3	(Netherlands) Charles Zwolsman	1–3
(Netherlands) Euro Racing	Lola T92/10	Judd GV10 3.5 L V10	M	3	(Spain) Jésus Pareja	3–5
(Netherlands) Euro Racing	Lola T92/10	Judd GV10 3.5 L V10	M	3	(Japan) Hideshi Matsuda	5
(Netherlands) Euro Racing	Lola T92/10	Judd GV10 3.5 L V10	M	4	(Sweden) Stefan Johansson	1–2
(Netherlands) Euro Racing	Lola T92/10	Judd GV10 3.5 L V10	M	4	(Spain) Jésus Pareja	1–2
(Netherlands) Euro Racing	Lola T92/10	Judd GV10 3.5 L V10	M	4	(Germany) Heinz-Harald Frentzen	3–5
(Netherlands) Euro Racing	Lola T92/10	Judd GV10 3.5 L V10	M	4	(Netherlands) Charles Zwolsman	3
(Netherlands) Euro Racing	Lola T92/10	Judd GV10 3.5 L V10	M	4	(Japan) Syunji Kasuya	3
(Netherlands) Euro Racing	Lola T92/10	Judd GV10 3.5 L V10	M	4	(United Kingdom) Phil Andrews	4
(Netherlands) Euro Racing	Lola T92/10	Judd GV10 3.5 L V10	M	4	(Netherlands) Cor Euser	5
(Netherlands) Euro Racing	Lola T92/10	Judd GV10 3.5 L V10	M	4	(Canada) David Tennyson	5
(Japan) Mazdaspeed	Mazda MXR-01	Mazda MV10 3.5 L V10	M	5	(Brazil) Maurizio Sandro Sala	All
(Japan) Mazdaspeed	Mazda MXR-01	Mazda MV10 3.5 L V10	M	5	(Germany) Volker Weidler	1, 3
(Japan) Mazdaspeed	Mazda MXR-01	Mazda MV10 3.5 L V10	M	5	(United Kingdom) Johnny Herbert	2–3
(Japan) Mazdaspeed	Mazda MXR-01	Mazda MV10 3.5 L V10	M	5	(Belgium) Bertrand Gachot	3
(Japan) Mazdaspeed	Mazda MXR-01	Mazda MV10 3.5 L V10	M	5	(Italy) Alex Caffi	4–6
(Japan) Mazdaspeed	Mazda MXR-01	Mazda MV10 3.5 L V10	M	5	(Japan) Takashi Yorino	5
(Japan) Mazdaspeed	Mazda MXR-01	Mazda MV10 3.5 L V10	M	6	(Japan) Yojiro Terada	3
(Japan) Mazdaspeed	Mazda MXR-01	Mazda MV10 3.5 L V10	M	6	(Japan) Takashi Yorino	3
(Japan) Mazdaspeed	Mazda MXR-01	Mazda MV10 3.5 L V10	M	6	(Brazil) Maurizio Sandro Sala	3
(Japan) Toyota Team Tom's	Toyota TS010	Toyota RV10 3.5 L V10	G	7	(United Kingdom) Geoff Lees	All
(Japan) Toyota Team Tom's	Toyota TS010	Toyota RV10 3.5 L V10	G	7	(Japan) Hitoshi Ogawa	1–2
(Japan) Toyota Team Tom's	Toyota TS010	Toyota RV10 3.5 L V10	G	7	(Australia) David Brabham	3–5
(Japan) Toyota Team Tom's	Toyota TS010	Toyota RV10 3.5 L V10	G	7	(Japan) Ukyo Katayama	3
(Japan) Toyota Team Tom's	Toyota TS010	Toyota RV10 3.5 L V10	G	7	(Netherlands) Jan Lammers	5–6
(Japan) Toyota Team Tom's	Toyota TS010	Toyota RV10 3.5 L V10	G	8	(United Kingdom) Andy Wallace	All
(Japan) Toyota Team Tom's	Toyota TS010	Toyota RV10 3.5 L V10	G	8	(Netherlands) Jan Lammers	1–4
(Japan) Toyota Team Tom's	Toyota TS010	Toyota RV10 3.5 L V10	G	8	(Italy) Teo Fabi	3
(Japan) Toyota Team Tom's	Toyota TS010	Toyota RV10 3.5 L V10	G	8	(United Kingdom) Kenny Acheson	5
(Japan) Toyota Team Tom's	Toyota TS010	Toyota RV10 3.5 L V10	G	8	(Japan) Masanori Sekiya	5
(Japan) Toyota Team Tom's	Toyota TS010	Toyota RV10 3.5 L V10	G	8	(Australia) David Brabham	6
(Japan) Toyota Team Tom's	Toyota TS010	Toyota RV10 3.5 L V10	G	33	(France) Pierre-Henri Raphanel	3
(Japan) Toyota Team Tom's	Toyota TS010	Toyota RV10 3.5 L V10	G	33	(United Kingdom) Kenny Acheson	3
(Japan) Toyota Team Tom's	Toyota TS010	Toyota RV10 3.5 L V10	G	33	(Japan) Masanori Sekiya	3
(United Kingdom) BRM	BRM P351	BRM 3.5 L V12	G	9	(South Africa) Wayne Taylor	2–3
(United Kingdom) BRM	BRM P351	BRM 3.5 L V12	G	9	(Finland) Harri Toivonen	2–3
(United Kingdom) BRM	BRM P351	BRM 3.5 L V12	G	9	(United Kingdom) Richard Jones	3

=== FIA Cup ===
Entrant	Car	Engine	Tyre	No.	Drivers	Rounds
(Italy) Bernard de Dryver with Action Formula	Spice SE90C	Ford Cosworth DFR 3.5 L V8	G	21	(Italy) Luigi Taverna	1–4
(Italy) Bernard de Dryver with Action Formula	Spice SE90C	Ford Cosworth DFR 3.5 L V8	G	21	(Italy) Alessandro Gini	1–4
(Italy) Bernard de Dryver with Action Formula	Spice SE90C	Ford Cosworth DFR 3.5 L V8	G	21	(United Kingdom) John Sheldon	3
(Italy) Bernard de Dryver with Action Formula	Spice SE90C	Ford Cosworth DFR 3.5 L V8	G	21	(Belgium) Bernard de Dryver	3
(United Kingdom) Chamberlain Engineering	Spice SE89C	Ford Cosworth DFZ 3.5 L V8	G	22	(France) Ferdinand de Lesseps	All
(United Kingdom) Chamberlain Engineering	Spice SE89C	Ford Cosworth DFZ 3.5 L V8	G	22	(Switzerland) Bernard Thuner	1
(United Kingdom) Chamberlain Engineering	Spice SE89C	Ford Cosworth DFZ 3.5 L V8	G	22	(United Kingdom) Will Hoy	2, 4
(United Kingdom) Chamberlain Engineering	Spice SE89C	Ford Cosworth DFZ 3.5 L V8	G	22	(United States) Olindo Iacobelli	3
(United Kingdom) Chamberlain Engineering	Spice SE89C	Ford Cosworth DFZ 3.5 L V8	G	22	(United Kingdom) Richard Piper	3
(United Kingdom) Chamberlain Engineering	Spice SE89C	Ford Cosworth DFZ 3.5 L V8	G	22	(United Kingdom) Nick Adams	5–6
(United Kingdom) Chamberlain Engineering	Spice SE89C	Ford Cosworth DFZ 3.5 L V8	G	22	(Japan) Masahiro Kimoto	5
(United Kingdom) Chamberlain Engineering	Spice SE89C	Ford Cosworth DFZ 3.5 L V8	G	36; 41	(Japan) Jun Harada	3, 6
(United Kingdom) Chamberlain Engineering	Spice SE89C	Ford Cosworth DFZ 3.5 L V8	G	36; 41	(Japan) Tomiko Yoshikawa	3, 6
(United Kingdom) Chamberlain Engineering	Spice SE89C	Ford Cosworth DFZ 3.5 L V8	G	36; 41	(Japan) Kenta Shimamura	3
(United Kingdom) Chamberlain Engineering	Spice SE89C	Ford Cosworth DFZ 3.5 L V8	G	36; 41	(United Kingdom) Divina Galica	6
(United Kingdom) GeePee Argo Racing	Argo JM19C	Ford Cosworth DFR 3.5 L V8	G	23	(United Kingdom) David Coyne	1
(United Kingdom) GeePee Argo Racing	Argo JM19C	Ford Cosworth DFR 3.5 L V8	G	23	(Switzerland) Georg Paulin	1
(Germany) GSR	Gebhardt C91	Ford Cosworth DFR 3.5 L V8	G	25	(Italy) Almo Coppelli	1–2
(Germany) GSR	Gebhardt C91	Ford Cosworth DFR 3.5 L V8	G	25	(Germany) Frank Krämer	1–2
(Italy) Team SCI	Spice SE90C	Ford Cosworth DFZ 3.5 L V8	G	29	(Italy) Ranieri Randaccio	1–4, 6
(Italy) Team SCI	Spice SE90C	Ford Cosworth DFZ 3.5 L V8	G	29	(Italy) Stefano Sebastiani	1–4, 6
(Italy) Team SCI	Spice SE90C	Ford Cosworth DFZ 3.5 L V8	G	29	(Italy) Vito Veninata	3
(United Kingdom) TDR Limited	Spice SE90C	Ford Cosworth DFZ 3.5 L V8	M	30	(United Kingdom) Chris Hodgetts	3
(United Kingdom) TDR Limited	Spice SE90C	Ford Cosworth DFZ 3.5 L V8	M	30	(France) François Migault	3
(United Kingdom) TDR Limited	Spice SE90C	Ford Cosworth DFZ 3.5 L V8	M	30	(France) Thierry Lecerf	3

== Results and standings ==
=== Race results ===
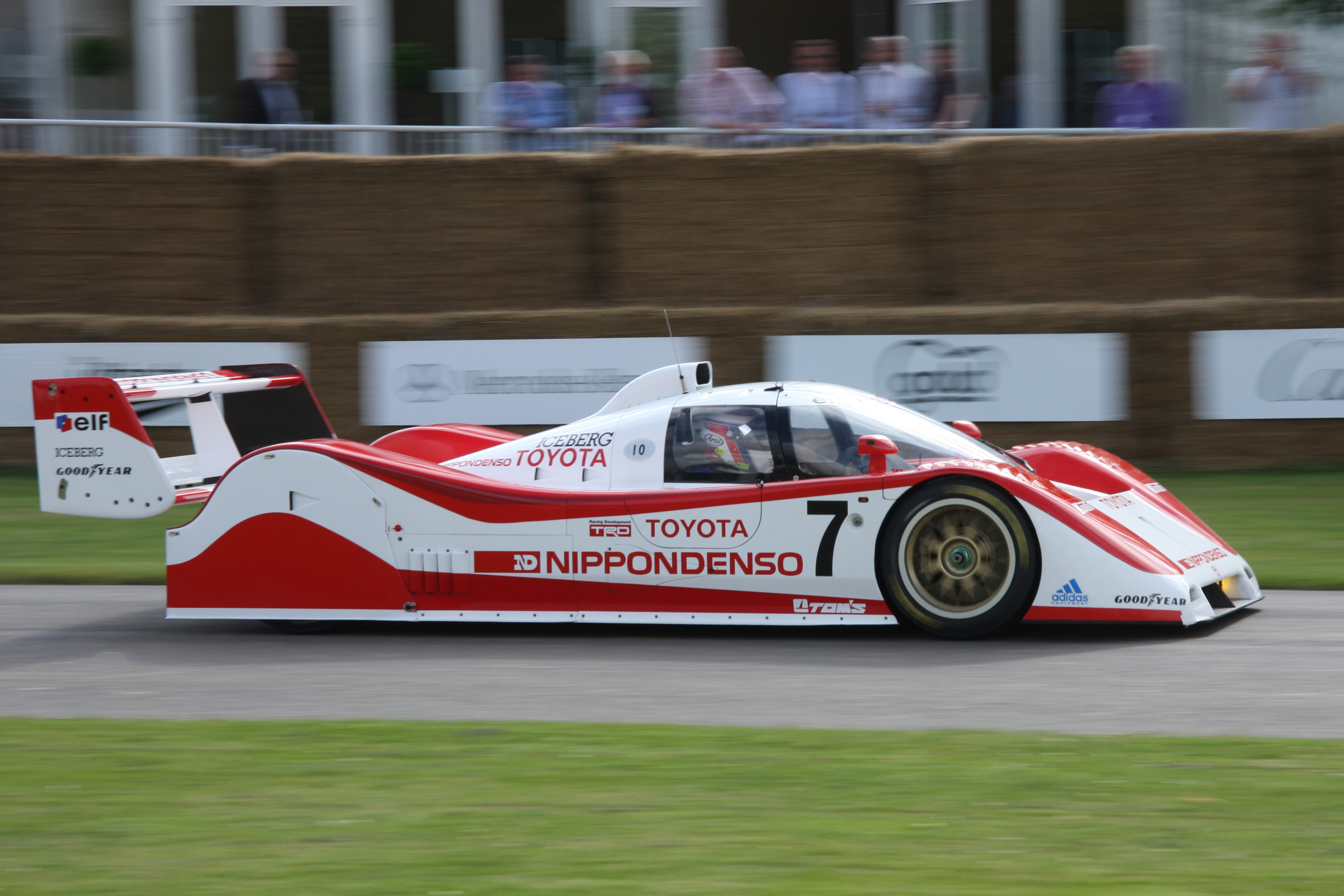
Toyota Team Tom's won one race with the Toyota TS010

Rnd	Circuit	Outright Winning Team	FIA Cup Winning Team	Reports
Rnd	Circuit	Outright Winning Drivers	FIA Cup Winning Drivers	Reports
1	Monza	(Japan) No. 7 Toyota Team Tom's	(United Kingdom) No. 22 Chamberlain Engineering	Report
1	Monza	(United Kingdom) Geoff Lees (Japan) Hitoshi Ogawa	(Switzerland) Bernard Thuner (France) Ferdinand de Lesseps	Report
2	Silverstone	(France) No. 1 Peugeot Talbot Sport	(United Kingdom) No. 22 Chamberlain Engineering	Report
2	Silverstone	(United Kingdom) Derek Warwick (France) Yannick Dalmas	(France) Ferdinand de Lesseps (United Kingdom) Will Hoy	Report
3	Le Mans	(France) No. 1 Peugeot Talbot Sport	(United Kingdom) No. 22 Chamberlain Engineering	Report
3	Le Mans	(United Kingdom) Derek Warwick (France) Yannick Dalmas (United Kingdom) Mark Blundell	(France) Ferdinand de Lesseps (United Kingdom) Richard Piper (France) Olindo Iacobelli	Report
4	Donington	(France) No. 2 Peugeot Talbot Sport	(United Kingdom) No. 22 Chamberlain Engineering	Report
4	Donington	(Italy) Mauro Baldi (France) Philippe Alliot	(France) Ferdinand de Lesseps (United Kingdom) Will Hoy	Report
5	Suzuka	(France) No. 1 Peugeot Talbot Sport	(United Kingdom) No. 22 Chamberlain Engineering	Report
5	Suzuka	(United Kingdom) Derek Warwick (France) Yannick Dalmas	(France) Ferdinand de Lesseps (United Kingdom) Nick Adams (Japan) Masahiro Kimoto	Report
6	Magny-Cours	(France) No. 2 Peugeot Talbot Sport	(United Kingdom) No. 22 Chamberlain Engineering	Report
6	Magny-Cours	(Italy) Mauro Baldi (France) Philippe Alliot	(France) Ferdinand de Lesseps (United Kingdom) Nick Adams	Report

=== Points system ===
Points were awarded on the following basis:

1st	2nd	3rd	4th	5th	6th	7th	8th	9th	10th
20	15	12	10	8	6	4	3	2	1

In order to be classified for points, a car had to complete 90% of the winner's distance. Further, drivers were required to complete at least 30% of their car's total race distance to qualify for championship points.

=== Drivers' World Championship ===
Pos	Driver	Team	(Italy) MON	(United Kingdom) SIL	(France) LMS	(United Kingdom) DON	(Japan) SUZ	(France) MAG	Points
1	(France) Yannick Dalmas	(France) Peugeot Talbot Sport	2	1	1	2	1	5	98
1	(United Kingdom) Derek Warwick	(France) Peugeot Talbot Sport	2	1	1	2	1	5	98
2	(France) Philippe Alliot	(France) Peugeot Talbot Sport	Ret	Ret	3	1	3	1	64
2	(Italy) Mauro Baldi	(France) Peugeot Talbot Sport	Ret	Ret	3	1	3	1	64
3	(United Kingdom) Geoff Lees	(Japan) Toyota Team Tom's	1	Ret	Ret	3	2	3	59
4	(Netherlands) Jan Lammers	(Japan) Toyota Team Tom's	Ret	Ret	5	Ret	2	3	35
5	(France) Ferdinand de Lesseps	(United Kingdom) Chamberlain Engineering	NC	3	7	6	5	7	34
6	(Brazil) Maurizio Sandro Sala	(Japan) Mazdaspeed	Ret	2	Ret	5	Ret	6	29
7	(United Kingdom) Johnny Herbert	(Japan) Mazdaspeed		2	4				25
8	(Australia) David Brabham	(Japan) Toyota Team Tom's			Ret	3	2	4	22
9	(Japan) Hitoshi Ogawa	(Japan) Toyota Team Tom's	1	Ret					20
10	(United Kingdom) Will Hoy	(United Kingdom) Chamberlain Engineering		3		6			18
11	(United Kingdom) Andy Wallace	(Japan) Toyota Team Tom's	Ret	Ret	5	Ret	Ret	4	18
12	(Italy) Stefano Sebastiani	(Italy) Team SCI	Ret	4	Ret	7		8	17
12	(Italy) Ranieri Randaccio	(Italy) Team SCI	Ret	4	Ret	7		8	17
13	(Germany) Heinz-Harald Frentzen	(Netherlands) Euro Racing			6	4	Ret		16
14	(United Kingdom) Kenny Acheson	(Japan) Toyota Team Tom's			2		Ret		15
14	(France) Pierre-Henri Raphanel	(Japan) Toyota Team Tom's			2				15
14	(France) Éric Hélary	(France) Peugeot Talbot Sport						2	15
14	(France) Christophe Bouchut	(France) Peugeot Talbot Sport						2	15
15	(Italy) Alex Caffi	(Japan) Mazdaspeed				5	Ret	6	14
16	(United Kingdom) Nick Adams	(United Kingdom) Chamberlain Engineering					5	7	12
17	(Germany) Volker Weidler	(Japan) Mazdaspeed	Ret		4				10
17	(United Kingdom) Phil Andrews	(Netherlands) Euro Racing				4			10
17	(Spain) Jésus Pareja	(Netherlands) Euro Racing	DNS	DSQ	Ret		4		10
17	(Japan) Hideshi Matsuda	(Netherlands) Euro Racing					4		10
18	(Italy) Teo Fabi	(Japan) Toyota Team Tom's			5				8
19	(Japan) Shunji Kasuya	(Netherlands) Euro Racing			6				6
19	(Japan) Jun Harada	(United Kingdom) Chamberlain Engineering			NC		6		6
19	(United Kingdom) Divina Galica	(United Kingdom) Chamberlain Engineering					6		6
20	(United Kingdom) Richard Piper	(United Kingdom) Chamberlain Engineering			7				4
20	(United States) Olindo Iacobelli	(United Kingdom) Chamberlain Engineering			7				4

Colour	Result
Gold	Winner
Silver	Second place
Bronze	Third place
Green	Points classification
Blue	Non-points classification
Blue	Non-classified finish (NC)
Purple	Retired, not classified (Ret)
Red	Did not qualify (DNQ)
Red	Did not pre-qualify (DNPQ)
Black	Disqualified (DSQ)
White	Did not start (DNS)
White	Withdrew (WD)
White	Race cancelled (C)
Blank	Did not practice (DNP)
Blank	Did not arrive (DNA)
Blank	Excluded (EX)

=== FIA Cup for Drivers ===
For the Suzuka round Chamberlain Engineering were the only team to enter the race so no points were awarded in the category.

Pos	Driver	Team	(Italy) MON	(United Kingdom) SIL	(France) LMS	(United Kingdom) DON	(Japan) SUZ	(France) MAG	Points
1	(France) Ferdinand de Lesseps	(United Kingdom) Chamberlain Engineering	1	1	1	1	1	1	100
2	(Italy) Ranieri Randaccio	(Italy) Team SCI	Ret	2	Ret	2		2	45
2	(Italy) Stefano Sebastiani	(Italy) Team SCI	Ret	2	Ret	2		2	45
3	(United Kingdom) Will Hoy	(United Kingdom) Chamberlain Engineering		1		1			40
4	(Switzerland) Bernard Thuner	(United Kingdom) Chamberlain Engineering	1						20
4	(United States) Olindo Iacobelli	(United Kingdom) Chamberlain Engineering			1				20
4	(United Kingdom) Richard Piper	(United Kingdom) Chamberlain Engineering			1				20
4	(United Kingdom) Nick Adams	(United Kingdom) Chamberlain Engineering					1	1	20
5	(Germany) Frank Krämer	(Germany) GSR	2	Ret					15
5	(Italy) Almo Coppelli	(Germany) GSR	2	Ret					15

=== Teams' World Championship ===
Pos	Team	(Italy) MON	(United Kingdom) SIL	(France) LMS	(United Kingdom) DON	(Japan) SUZ	(France) MAG	Points
1	(France) Peugeot Talbot Sport	2	1	1	1	1	1	115
2	(Japan) Toyota Team Tom's	1	Ret	2	3	2	3	74
3	(Japan) Mazdaspeed	Ret	2	4	5	Ret	6	39
4	(United Kingdom) Chamberlain Engineering	NC	3	7	6	5	7	34
5	(Netherlands) Euro Racing	Ret	Ret	6	4	4		26
6	(Italy) Team SCI	Ret	4	Ret	7		8	17

=== FIA Cup for Teams ===
For the Suzuka round Chamberlain Engineering were the only team to enter the race so no points were awarded in the category.

Pos	Team	(Italy) MON	(United Kingdom) SIL	(France) LMS	(United Kingdom) DON	(Japan) SUZ	(France) MAG	Points
1	(United Kingdom) Chamberlain Engineering	1	1	1	1	1	1	100
2	(Italy) Team SCI	Ret	2	Ret	2		2	45
3	(Germany) GSR	2	Ret					15

== Post-season ==
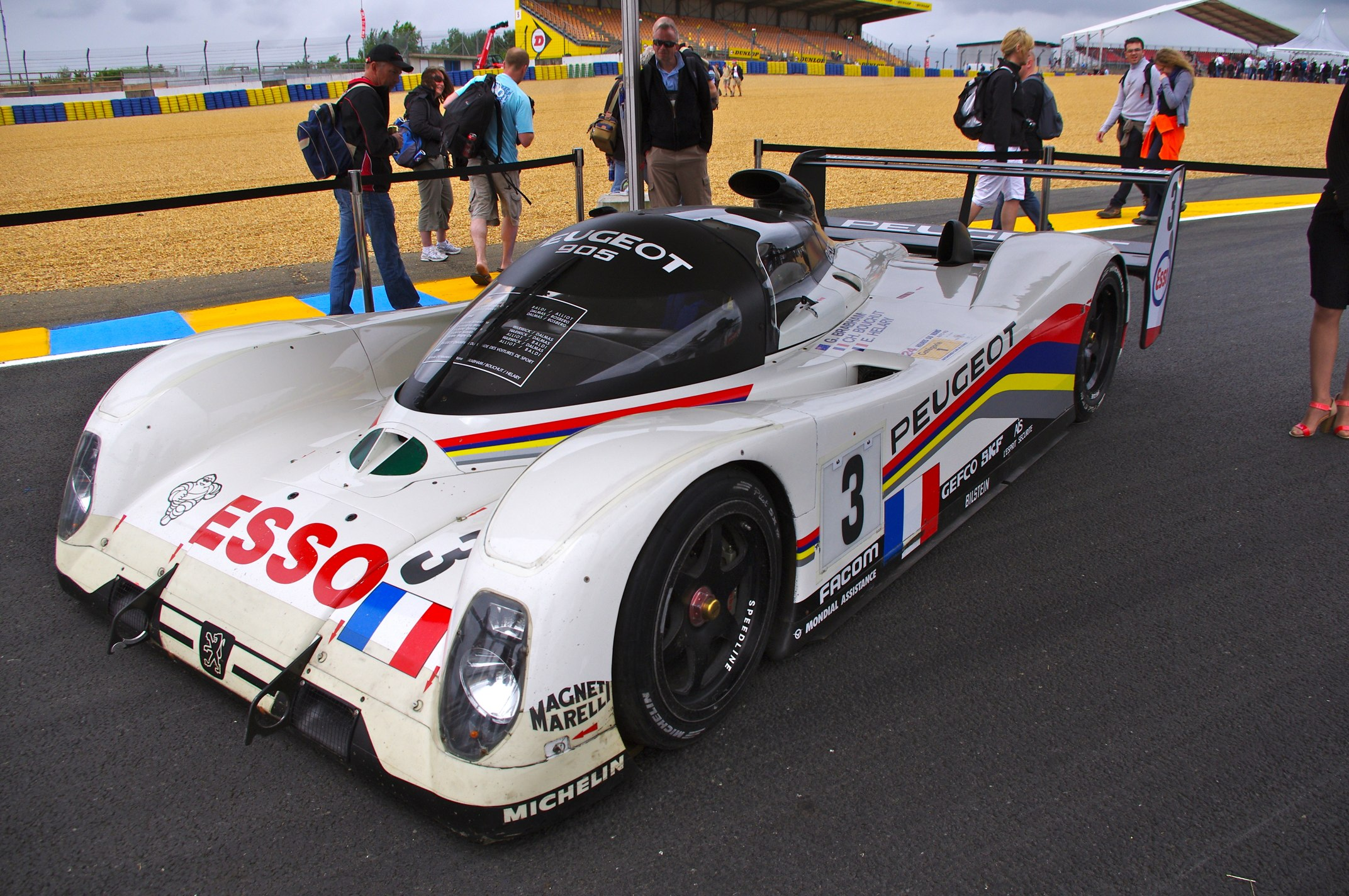
Peugeot's 905 Evo 1 Bis which won their sole event of 1993, the 24 Hours of Le Mans

Although in preparation for the 1992 season there showed some potential of allowing the championship to survive through to future seasons, especially with promises from Peugeot, as the season went on it became apparent that some of this potential was merely false hope. The customer Jaguars never showed, even though they continued to be promised even as the season went on. Konrad's Lamborghini powered sportscar was also never raced after promises of continued development. BRM's effort only resulted in them racing once, at Le Mans, where they finished last after completing only 20 laps. After Le Mans, they simply stopped showing up. The season thus became simply a showing of Peugeot dominance due to the large amount of money they had poured into the 905 project.

Thus hope for 1993 was slim. Resting on the promises of Peugeot as well as Nissan who claimed they were returning to the series with their P35, the FIA tentatively announced that the 1993 season would occur. However, following Nissan's decision to cancel the P35 due to economic difficulties, and with a lack of entries announcing their participation, the FIA cancelled the 1993 season. This marked the end of 40 continuous years of the World Sportscar Championship, albeit in different guises.

Sportscar racing was left without a single unified championship in which to complete, leading to a large number of smaller breakaway series across the world. The All Japan Sports Prototype Championship series in Japan was also unable to continue after 1992 as well, although Group C cars continued to participate as guests in other series. IMSA's championships in North America continued on but also suffering from dwindling fields until it was replaced by the American Le Mans Series in 1999. The FIA took over the European Sports Racing World Cup in 1999 to create the FIA Sportscar Championship in a fashion similar to the World Sportscar Championship, but it failed by 2003.

Following many rough years, by 2004 sportscar racing had become stable with the ACO's two main sportscar series, the European Le Mans Series and American Le Mans Series, with the Japan Le Mans Challenge to follow in 2006. However, the Japan Le Mans Challenge was dissolved the same year. Then, in 2009 the ACO formed the Asian Le Mans Series. Finally, in 2010 ACO formed the Intercontinental Le Mans Cup a global championship, which was renamed FIA World Endurance Championship for 2012, the de facto successor to the former world sportscar championship.
