= 1992 500 km of Silverstone =

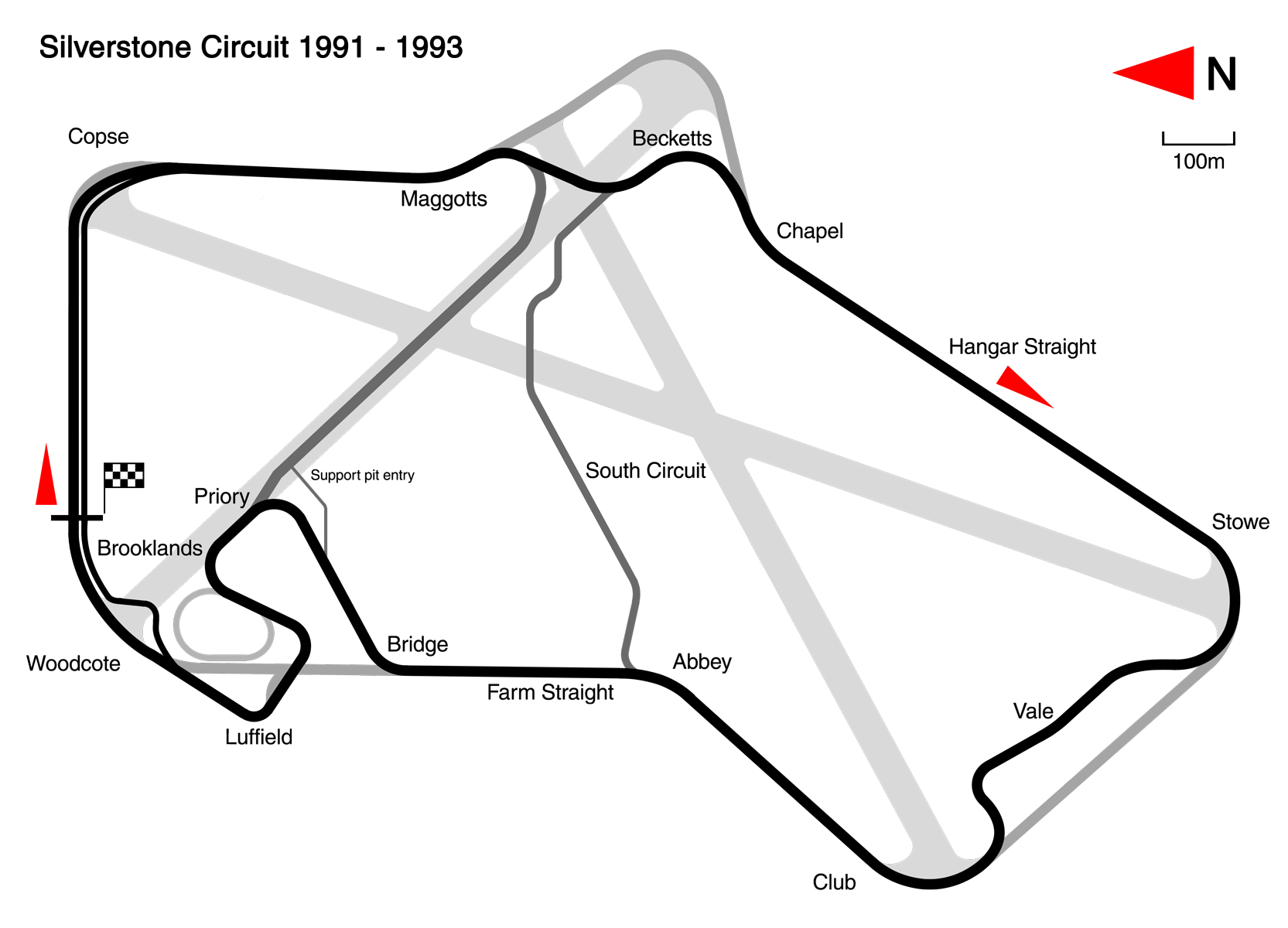
Map of the Silverstone Circuit (1991–1993)

The 1992 500 km of Silverstone was the second race of the FIA Sportscar World Championship. It was run on 10 May 1992.

== Qualifying ==
=== Qualifying results ===
Class leaders are in bold. The fastest time set by each entry is denoted in gray.

| Pos. | Class | No. | Team | Qualifying 1 | Qualifying 2 | Gap |
|---|---|---|---|---|---|---|
| 1 | C1 | 1 | **(France) Peugeot Talbot Sport** | **1:24.421** | 1:46.729 | |
| 2 | C1 | 2 | (France) Peugeot Talbot Sport | 1:24.670 | **1:44.135** | +0.249 |
| 3 | C1 | 7 | (Japan) Toyota Team Tom's | 1:25.982 | No Time | +1.561 |
| 4 | C1 | 8 | (Japan) Toyota Team Tom's | 1:28.285 | 1:51.049 | +3.864 |
| 5 | C1 | 3 | (Netherlands) Euro Racing | 1:28.961 | 1:55.607 | +4.540 |
| 6 | C1 | 4 | (Netherlands) Euro Racing | 1:28.996 | No Time | +4.575 |
| 7 | C1 | 5 | (Japan) Mazdaspeed | 1:30.050 | 2:02.396 | +5.629 |
| 8 | FIA Cup | 22 | **(United Kingdom) Chamberlain Engineering** | **1:41.114** | 2:09.371 | +16.693 |
| 9 | FIA Cup | 21 | (Italy) Action Formula | 1:43.312 | 2:15.384 | +18.891 |
| 10 | FIA Cup | 29 | (Italy) Team S.C.I. | 1:43.376 | **2:03.712** | +18.955 |
| 11 | FIA Cup | 25 | (Germany) G.S.R. GmbH | 1:50.045 | 2:07.854 | +25.624 |
| 12 | C1 | 9 | (United Kingdom) British Racing Motors | No Time | 2:00.182 | +36.361 |

== Race ==
=== Race results ===
Class winners in bold. Cars failing to complete 90% of the winner's distance are marked as Not Classified (NC).

| Pos | Class | No | Team | Drivers | Chassis | Tyre | Laps |
| Pos | Class | No | Team | Drivers | Engine | Tyre | Laps |
|---|---|---|---|---|---|---|---|
| 1 | **C1** | **1** | **(France) Peugeot Talbot Sport** | **(France) Yannick Dalmas (United Kingdom) Derek Warwick** | **Peugeot 905 Evo 1B** | MI | **96** |
| 1 | **C1** | **1** | **(France) Peugeot Talbot Sport** | **(France) Yannick Dalmas (United Kingdom) Derek Warwick** | **Peugeot SA35 3.5L V10** | MI | **96** |
| 2 | C1 | 5 | (Japan) Mazdaspeed | (Brazil) Maurizio Sandro Sala (United Kingdom) Johnny Herbert | Mazda MXR-01 | MI | 94 |
| 2 | C1 | 5 | (Japan) Mazdaspeed | (Brazil) Maurizio Sandro Sala (United Kingdom) Johnny Herbert | Mazda (Judd) MV10 3.5L V10 | MI | 94 |
| 3 | **FIA; Cup** | **22** | **(United Kingdom) Chamberlain Engineering** | **(United Kingdom) Will Hoy (France) Ferdinand de Lesseps** | **Spice SE89C** | G | **85** |
| 3 | **FIA; Cup** | **22** | **(United Kingdom) Chamberlain Engineering** | **(United Kingdom) Will Hoy (France) Ferdinand de Lesseps** | **Ford Cosworth DFZ 3.5L V8** | G | **85** |
| 4 | FIA; Cup | 29 | (Italy) Team S.C.I. | (Italy) Ranieri Randaccio (Italy) Stefano Sebastiani | Spice SE90C | G | 77 |
| 4 | FIA; Cup | 29 | (Italy) Team S.C.I. | (Italy) Ranieri Randaccio (Italy) Stefano Sebastiani | Ford Cosworth DFR 3.5L V8 | G | 77 |
| 5 DSQ^{†} | C1 | 4 | (Netherlands) Euro Racing | (Spain) Jesús Pareja (Sweden) Stefan Johansson | Lola T92/10 | MI | 90 |
| 5 DSQ^{†} | C1 | 4 | (Netherlands) Euro Racing | (Spain) Jesús Pareja (Sweden) Stefan Johansson | Judd GV10 3.5L V10 | MI | 90 |
| 6 DNF | C1 | 7 | (Japan) Toyota Team Tom's | (United Kingdom) Geoff Lees (Japan) Hitoshi Ogawa | Toyota TS010 | G | 55 |
| 6 DNF | C1 | 7 | (Japan) Toyota Team Tom's | (United Kingdom) Geoff Lees (Japan) Hitoshi Ogawa | Toyota RV10 3.5L V10 | G | 55 |
| 7 DNF | C1 | 3 | (Netherlands) Euro Racing | (Netherlands) Cor Euser (Netherlands) Charles Zwolsman | Lola T92/10 | MI | 29 |
| 7 DNF | C1 | 3 | (Netherlands) Euro Racing | (Netherlands) Cor Euser (Netherlands) Charles Zwolsman | Judd GV10 3.5L V10 | MI | 29 |
| 8 DNF | C1 | 2 | (France) Peugeot Talbot Sport | (France) Philippe Alliot (Italy) Mauro Baldi | Peugeot 905 Evo 1B | MI | 26 |
| 8 DNF | C1 | 2 | (France) Peugeot Talbot Sport | (France) Philippe Alliot (Italy) Mauro Baldi | Peugeot SA35 3.5L V10 | MI | 26 |
| 9 DNF | FIA; Cup | 21 | (Italy) Action Formula | (Italy) Luigi Taverna (Italy) Alessandro Gini | Spice SE90C | G | 25 |
| 9 DNF | FIA; Cup | 21 | (Italy) Action Formula | (Italy) Luigi Taverna (Italy) Alessandro Gini | Ford Cosworth DFR 3.5L V8 | G | 25 |
| 10 DNF | C1 | 8 | (Japan) Toyota Team Tom's | (Netherlands) Jan Lammers (United Kingdom) Andy Wallace | Toyota TS010 | G | 9 |
| 10 DNF | C1 | 8 | (Japan) Toyota Team Tom's | (Netherlands) Jan Lammers (United Kingdom) Andy Wallace | Toyota RV10 3.5L V10 | G | 9 |
| 11 DNF | FIA; Cup | 25 | (Germany) G.S.R. GmbH | (Italy) Almo Coppelli (Germany) Frank Kraemer | Gebhardt C91 | G | 2 |
| 11 DNF | FIA; Cup | 25 | (Germany) G.S.R. GmbH | (Italy) Almo Coppelli (Germany) Frank Kraemer | Ford Cosworth DFR 3.5L V8 | G | 2 |
| DNS | C1 | 9 | (United Kingdom) British Racing Motors | (Finland) Harri Toivonen (South Africa) Wayne Taylor | BRM P351 | G | - |
| DNS | C1 | 9 | (United Kingdom) British Racing Motors | (Finland) Harri Toivonen (South Africa) Wayne Taylor | BRM (Weslake) 3.5L V12 | G | - |

† - #4 Euro Racing was disqualified for using an illegal fuel compound.

== Statistics ==
- Pole Position - Derek Warwick (#1 Peugeot Talbot Sport) - 1:24.421
- Fastest Lap - Yannick Dalmas (#1 Peugeot Talbot Sport) - 1:29.043
- Average Speed - 197.405 km/h

World Sportscar Championship
| Previous race: 1992 500km of Monza | 1992 season | Next race: 1992 24 Hours of Le Mans |
