= 1992 500 km of Donington =

Layout of the Donington Park

The 1992 500 km of Donington was the fourth race of the FIA Sportscar World Championship. It was run on July 19, 1992

== Qualifying ==
=== Qualifying results ===
Class leaders are in bold. The fastest time set by each entry is denoted in gray.

Pos.	Class	No.	Team	Qualifying 1	Qualifying 2	Gap
1	C1	1	**(France) Peugeot Talbot Sport**	**1:15.570**	**1:15.285**	
2	C1	2	(France) Peugeot Talbot Sport	1:16.049	1:16.044	+0.759
3	C1	7	(Japan) Toyota Team Tom's	1:17.474	1:17.033	+1.748
4	C1	8	(Japan) Toyota Team Tom's	1:17.078	1:17.484	+1.793
5	C1	3	(Netherlands) Euro Racing	1:20.284	1:18.722	+3.437
6	C1	5	(Japan) Mazdaspeed	1:20.446	1:19.279	+3.994
7	C1	4	(Netherlands) Euro Racing	1:21.181	1:28.553	+5.896
8	FIA Cup	22	**(United Kingdom) Chamberlain Engineering**	1:26.847	**1:24.865**	+9.580
9	FIA Cup	21	(Italy) Action Formula	**1:25.576**	1:27.281	+10.291
10	FIA Cup	29	(Italy) Team S.C.I.	1:33.101	No Time	+17.816

== Race ==
=== Race results ===
Class winners in bold. Cars failing to complete 90% of winner's distance marked as Not Classified (NC).

Pos	Class	No	Team	Drivers	Chassis	Tyre	Laps
Pos	Class	No	Team	Drivers	Engine	Tyre	Laps
1	**C1**	**2**	**(France) Peugeot Talbot Sport**	**(Italy) Mauro Baldi (France) Philippe Alliot**	**Peugeot 905 Evo 1B**	MI	**125**
1	**C1**	**2**	**(France) Peugeot Talbot Sport**	**(Italy) Mauro Baldi (France) Philippe Alliot**	**Peugeot SA35 3.5L V10**	MI	**125**
2	C1	1	(France) Peugeot Talbot Sport	(France) Yannick Dalmas (United Kingdom) Derek Warwick	Peugeot 905 Evo 1B	MI	125
2	C1	1	(France) Peugeot Talbot Sport	(France) Yannick Dalmas (United Kingdom) Derek Warwick	Peugeot SA35 3.5L V10	MI	125
3	C1	7	(Japan) Toyota Team Tom's	(United Kingdom) Geoff Lees (Australia) David Brabham	Toyota TS010	G	125
3	C1	7	(Japan) Toyota Team Tom's	(United Kingdom) Geoff Lees (Australia) David Brabham	Toyota RV10 3.5L V10	G	125
4	C1	4	(Netherlands) Euro Racing	(Germany) Heinz-Harald Frentzen (United Kingdom) Phil Andrews	Lola T92/10	MI	119
4	C1	4	(Netherlands) Euro Racing	(Germany) Heinz-Harald Frentzen (United Kingdom) Phil Andrews	Judd GV10 3.5L V10	MI	119
5	C1	5	(Japan) Mazdaspeed	(Brazil) Maurizio Sandro Sala (Italy) Alex Caffi	Mazda MXR-01	MI	112
5	C1	5	(Japan) Mazdaspeed	(Brazil) Maurizio Sandro Sala (Italy) Alex Caffi	Mazda (Judd) MV10 3.5L V10	MI	112
6	**FIA; Cup**	**22**	**(United Kingdom) Chamberlain Engineering**	**(United Kingdom) Will Hoy (France) Ferdinand de Lesseps**	**Spice SE89C**	G	**111**
6	**FIA; Cup**	**22**	**(United Kingdom) Chamberlain Engineering**	**(United Kingdom) Will Hoy (France) Ferdinand de Lesseps**	**Ford Cosworth DFZ 3.5L V8**	G	**111**
7	FIA; Cup	29	(Italy) Team S.C.I.	(Italy) Ranieri Randaccio (Italy) Stefano Sebastiani	Spice SE90C	G	102
7	FIA; Cup	29	(Italy) Team S.C.I.	(Italy) Ranieri Randaccio (Italy) Stefano Sebastiani	Ford Cosworth DFR 3.5L V8	G	102
8 NC	FIA; Cup	21	(Italy) Action Formula	(Italy) Luigi Taverna (Italy) Alessandro Gini	Spice SE90C	G	54
8 NC	FIA; Cup	21	(Italy) Action Formula	(Italy) Luigi Taverna (Italy) Alessandro Gini	Ford Cosworth DFR 3.5L V8	G	54
9 DNF	C1	8	(Japan) Toyota Team Tom's	(Netherlands) Jan Lammers (United Kingdom) Andy Wallace	Toyota TS010	G	85
9 DNF	C1	8	(Japan) Toyota Team Tom's	(Netherlands) Jan Lammers (United Kingdom) Andy Wallace	Toyota RV10 3.5L V10	G	85
10 DNF	C1	3	(Netherlands) Euro Racing	(Netherlands) Cor Euser (Netherlands) Charles Zwolsman	Lola T92/10	MI	38
10 DNF	C1	3	(Netherlands) Euro Racing	(Netherlands) Cor Euser (Netherlands) Charles Zwolsman	Judd GV10 3.5L V10	MI	38

== Statistics ==
- Pole Position - #1 Peugeot Talbot Sport
- Fastest Lap - #2 Peugeot Talbot Sport
- Average Speed - 173.306 km/h

World Sportscar Championship
Previous race: 1992 24 Hours of Le Mans	1992 season	Next race: 1992 1000km of Suzuka
