= 1992 500 km of Monza =

1992 Sportscar race

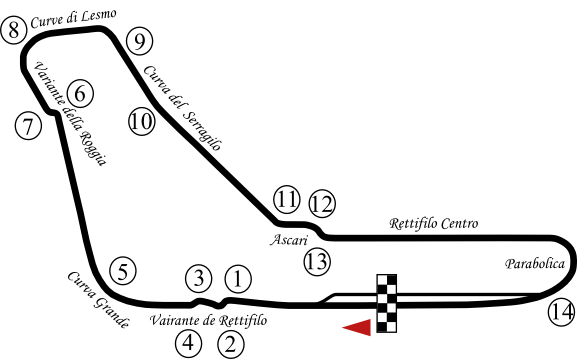
Layout of the Autodromo Nazionale di Monza (1976-1993)

The 1992 500 km of Monza was the opening race of the FIA Sportscar World Championship. It was run on April 26, 1992 at Monza, and was won by Geoff Lees and Hitoshi Ogawa driving a Toyota TS010. Unusually, the race winning car was the only car to finish the race having completed enough laps to be classified. Yannick Dalmas led in the closing stages before crashing with two laps remaining. The wrecked Peugeot was only overtaken by the race winning Toyota. The other two remaining cars in the race, a Chamberlain entered Spice-Cosworth and the Gebhardt-Cosworth, both fell short of the 90% race distance requirement to be classified race finishers, 79 laps.

== Qualifying ==
=== Qualifying results ===
Class leaders are in bold. The fastest time set by each entry is denoted in gray.

Pos.	Class	No.	Team	Qualifying 1	Qualifying 2	Gap
1	C1	1	**(France) Peugeot Talbot Sport**	1:27.240	**1:26.019**	
2	C1	7	(Japan) Toyota Team Tom's	1:26.960	1:26.252	+0.233
3	C1	2	(France) Peugeot Talbot Sport	**1:26.641**	1:26.409	+0.390
4	C1	8	(Japan) Toyota Team Tom's	1:27.957	1:26.727	+0.708
5	C1	5	(Japan) Mazdaspeed	1:32.738	1:29.074	+3.055
6	C1	4	(Netherlands) Euro Racing	1:33.110	1:29.709	+3.690
7	C1	3	(Netherlands) Euro Racing	1:31.663	1:30.268	+4.249
8	FIA Cup	21	**(Italy) Action Formula**	1:41.978	**1:40.478**	+14.459
9	FIA Cup	22	(United Kingdom) Chamberlain Engineering	**1:41.237**	1:40.619	+14.600
10	FIA Cup	29	(Italy) Team S.C.I.	1:43.875	1:40.818	+14.799
11	FIA Cup	23	(United Kingdom) GeePee Argo Cars	1:46.725	1:43.542	+17.523
12	FIA Cup	25	(Germany) G.S.R. GmbH	2:05.406	No Time	+39.387

== Race ==
=== Race results ===
Class winners in bold. Cars failing to complete 90% of winner's distance marked as Not Classified (NC).

Pos	Class	No	Team	Drivers	Chassis	Tyre	Laps
Pos	Class	No	Team	Drivers	Engine	Tyre	Laps
1	**C1**	**7**	**(Japan) Toyota Team Tom's**	**(United Kingdom) Geoff Lees (Japan) Hitoshi Ogawa**	**Toyota TS010**	G	**87**
1	**C1**	**7**	**(Japan) Toyota Team Tom's**	**(United Kingdom) Geoff Lees (Japan) Hitoshi Ogawa**	**Toyota RV10 3.5L V10**	G	**87**
2 DNF	C1	1	(France) Peugeot Talbot Sport	(France) Yannick Dalmas (United Kingdom) Derek Warwick	Peugeot 905 Evo 1B	MI	85
2 DNF	C1	1	(France) Peugeot Talbot Sport	(France) Yannick Dalmas (United Kingdom) Derek Warwick	Peugeot SA35 3.5L V10	MI	85
3 NC	**FIA; Cup**	**22**	**(United Kingdom) Chamberlain Engineering**	**(Switzerland) Bernard Thuner (France) Ferdinand de Lesseps**	**Spice SE89C**	G	**76**
3 NC	**FIA; Cup**	**22**	**(United Kingdom) Chamberlain Engineering**	**(Switzerland) Bernard Thuner (France) Ferdinand de Lesseps**	**Ford Cosworth DFZ 3.5L V8**	G	**76**
4 NC	FIA; Cup	25	(Germany) G.S.R. GmbH	(Italy) Almo Coppelli (Germany) Frank Krämer	Gebhardt C91	G	75
4 NC	FIA; Cup	25	(Germany) G.S.R. GmbH	(Italy) Almo Coppelli (Germany) Frank Krämer	Ford Cosworth DFR 3.5L V8	G	75
5 DNF	FIA; Cup	21	(Italy) Action Formula	(Italy) Luigi Taverna (Italy) Alessandro Gini	Spice SE90C	G	59
5 DNF	FIA; Cup	21	(Italy) Action Formula	(Italy) Luigi Taverna (Italy) Alessandro Gini	Ford Cosworth DFR 3.5L V8	G	59
6 DNF	FIA; Cup	29	(Italy) Team S.C.I.	(Italy) Ranieri Randaccio (Italy) Stefano Sebastiani	Spice SE90C	G	46
6 DNF	FIA; Cup	29	(Italy) Team S.C.I.	(Italy) Ranieri Randaccio (Italy) Stefano Sebastiani	Ford Cosworth DFR 3.5L V8	G	46
7 DNF	C1	2	(France) Peugeot Talbot Sport	(France) Philippe Alliot (Italy) Mauro Baldi	Peugeot 905 Evo 1B	MI	39
7 DNF	C1	2	(France) Peugeot Talbot Sport	(France) Philippe Alliot (Italy) Mauro Baldi	Peugeot SA35 3.5L V10	MI	39
8 DNF	C1	3	(Netherlands) Euro Racing	(Netherlands) Cor Euser (Netherlands) Charles Zwolsman	Lola T92/10	MI	39
8 DNF	C1	3	(Netherlands) Euro Racing	(Netherlands) Cor Euser (Netherlands) Charles Zwolsman	Judd GV10 3.5L V10	MI	39
9 DNF	C1	5	(Japan) Mazdaspeed	(Brazil) Maurizio Sandro Sala (Germany) Volker Weidler	Mazda MXR-01	MI	35
9 DNF	C1	5	(Japan) Mazdaspeed	(Brazil) Maurizio Sandro Sala (Germany) Volker Weidler	Mazda (Judd) MV10 3.5L V10	MI	35
10 DNF	C1	8	(Japan) Toyota Team Tom's	(Netherlands) Jan Lammers (United Kingdom) Andy Wallace	Toyota TS010	G	25
10 DNF	C1	8	(Japan) Toyota Team Tom's	(Netherlands) Jan Lammers (United Kingdom) Andy Wallace	Toyota RV10 3.5L V10	G	25
11 DNF	FIA; Cup	23	(United Kingdom) GeePee Argo Cars	(United Kingdom) David Coyne (Switzerland) Georg Palin	Argo JM19D	G	25
11 DNF	FIA; Cup	23	(United Kingdom) GeePee Argo Cars	(United Kingdom) David Coyne (Switzerland) Georg Palin	Ford Cosworth DFR 3.5L V8	G	25
DNS	C1	4	(Netherlands) Euro Racing	(Spain) Jesús Pareja (Sweden) Stefan Johansson	Lola T92/10	MI	-
DNS	C1	4	(Netherlands) Euro Racing	(Spain) Jesús Pareja (Sweden) Stefan Johansson	Judd GV10 3.5L V10	MI	-

== Statistics ==
- Pole Position - #1 Peugeot Talbot Sport - 1:26.019
- Fastest Lap - #2 Peugeot Talbot Sport - 1:29.386
- Average Speed - 221.411 km/h

World Sportscar Championship
Previous race: None	1992 season	Next race: 1992 500km of Silverstone
