= 1992 1000 km of Suzuka =

Sports event

1992 1000 km Suzuka

Seasons
- ← 1991 1993 →

Layout of the Suzuka International Racing Course (1987-2002)

The 1992 1000 km of Suzuka was the fifth race of the FIA Sportscar World Championship. It was run on August 30, 1992.

This event allowed for cars from the All Japan Sports Prototype Championship (JSPC) to participate in their own class.

== Qualifying ==
=== Qualifying results ===
Class leaders are in bold. The fastest time set by each entry is denoted in gray.

Pos.	Class	No.	Team	Qualifying 1	Qualifying 2	Gap
1	C1	2	**(France) Peugeot Talbot Sport**	1:47.245	**1:43.957**	
2	C1	1	(France) Peugeot Talbot Sport	**1:45.026**	1:45.674	+1.069
3	C1	7	(Japan) Toyota Team Tom's	1:47.946	1:46.706	+2.749
4	C1	8	(Japan) Toyota Team Tom's	1:48.805	1:49.582	+4.848
5	JSPC	44	**(Japan) From-A Racing**	**1:52.579**	**1:48.891**	+4.934
6	C1	5	(Japan) Mazdaspeed	1:50.868	1:56.552	+6,911
7	C1	4	(Netherlands) Euro Racing	1:56.312	1:51.336	+7.379
8	C1	3	(Netherlands) Euro Racing	1:56.598	1:58.806	+12.641
9	JSPC	43	(Japan) British Barn International	2:05.546	2:03.783	+19.826
10	FIA Cup	22	**(United Kingdom) Chamberlain Engineering**	**2:06.823**	No Time	+22.866
11	FIA Cup	41	(United Kingdom) Chamberlain Engineering	2:10.483	**2:12.129**	+26.526

== Race ==
=== Race results ===
Class winners in bold. Cars failing to complete 90% of winner's distance marked as Not Classified (NC).

Pos	Class	No	Team	Drivers	Chassis	Tyre	Laps
Pos	Class	No	Team	Drivers	Engine	Tyre	Laps
1	**C1**	**1**	**(France) Peugeot Talbot Sport**	**(United Kingdom) Derek Warwick (France) Yannick Dalmas**	**Peugeot 905 Evo 1B**	M	**171**
1	**C1**	**1**	**(France) Peugeot Talbot Sport**	**(United Kingdom) Derek Warwick (France) Yannick Dalmas**	**Peugeot SA35 3.5L V10**	M	**171**
2	C1	7	(Japan) Toyota Team Tom's	(Netherlands) Jan Lammers (United Kingdom) Geoff Lees (Australia) David Brabham	Toyota TS010	G	170
2	C1	7	(Japan) Toyota Team Tom's	(Netherlands) Jan Lammers (United Kingdom) Geoff Lees (Australia) David Brabham	Toyota RV10 3.5L V10	G	170
3	C1	2	(France) Peugeot Talbot Sport	(France) Philippe Alliot (Italy) Mauro Baldi	Peugeot 905 Evo 1B	M	163
3	C1	2	(France) Peugeot Talbot Sport	(France) Philippe Alliot (Italy) Mauro Baldi	Peugeot SA35 3.5L V10	M	163
4	**JSPC**	**44**	**(Japan) From-A Racing**	**(Italy) Mauro Martini (Japan) Katsutomo Kaneishi (United States) Jeff Krosnoff**	**Nissan R91CK**	B	**163**
4	**JSPC**	**44**	**(Japan) From-A Racing**	**(Italy) Mauro Martini (Japan) Katsutomo Kaneishi (United States) Jeff Krosnoff**	**Nissan VRH35Z 3.5L Turbo V8**	B	**163**
5	C1	3	(Netherlands) Euro Racing	(Spain) Jesús Pareja (Japan) Hideshi Matsuda	Lola T92/10	M	160
5	C1	3	(Netherlands) Euro Racing	(Spain) Jesús Pareja (Japan) Hideshi Matsuda	Judd GV10 3.5L V10	M	160
6	**FIA; Cup**	**22**	**(United Kingdom) Chamberlain Engineering**	**(France) Ferdinand de Lesseps (United Kingdom) Nick Adams (Japan) Masahiro Kimoto**	**Spice SE89C**	G	**144**
6	**FIA; Cup**	**22**	**(United Kingdom) Chamberlain Engineering**	**(France) Ferdinand de Lesseps (United Kingdom) Nick Adams (Japan) Masahiro Kimoto**	**Ford Cosworth DFZ 3.5L V8**	G	**144**
7	FIA; Cup	41	(United Kingdom) Chamberlain Engineering	(Japan) Jun Harada (Japan) Tomiko Yoshikawa (United Kingdom) Divina Galica	Spice SE89C	G	138
7	FIA; Cup	41	(United Kingdom) Chamberlain Engineering	(Japan) Jun Harada (Japan) Tomiko Yoshikawa (United Kingdom) Divina Galica	Ford Cosworth DFZ 3.5L V8	G	138
8 DNF	C1	5	(Japan) Mazdaspeed	(Brazil) Maurizio Sandro Sala (Italy) Alex Caffi (Japan) Takashi Yorino	Mazda MXR-01	M	104
8 DNF	C1	5	(Japan) Mazdaspeed	(Brazil) Maurizio Sandro Sala (Italy) Alex Caffi (Japan) Takashi Yorino	Mazda (Judd) MV10 3.5L V10	M	104
9 DNF	C1	8	(Japan) Toyota Team Tom's	(United Kingdom) Andy Wallace (United Kingdom) Kenny Acheson (Japan) Masanori Sekiya	Toyota TS010	G	83
9 DNF	C1	8	(Japan) Toyota Team Tom's	(United Kingdom) Andy Wallace (United Kingdom) Kenny Acheson (Japan) Masanori Sekiya	Toyota RV10 3.5L V10	G	83
10 DNF	JSPC	43	(Japan) British Barn International	(Japan) Hideo Fukuyama (Japan) Jiro Yoneyama (Japan) Takahiko Hara	British Barn (Tom's) BB90R	G	40
10 DNF	JSPC	43	(Japan) British Barn International	(Japan) Hideo Fukuyama (Japan) Jiro Yoneyama (Japan) Takahiko Hara	Ford Cosworth DFZ 3.5L V8	G	40
11 DNF	C1	4	(Netherlands) Euro Racing	(Netherlands) Cor Euser (Germany) Heinz-Harald Frentzen (Canada) David Tennyson	Lola T92/10	M	31
11 DNF	C1	4	(Netherlands) Euro Racing	(Netherlands) Cor Euser (Germany) Heinz-Harald Frentzen (Canada) David Tennyson	Judd GV10 3.5L V10	M	31

== Statistics ==
- Pole Position - #2 Peugeot Talbot Sport - 1:43.957
- Fastest Lap - #2 Peugeot Talbot Sport - 1:50.660
- Average Speed - 182.228 km/h

World Sportscar Championship
Previous race: 1992 500km of Donington	1992 season	Next race: 1992 500km of Magny-Cours
