= Charles Zwolsman =

Charles Zwolsman may refer to:

- Charles Zwolsman Jr. (born 1979), Dutch race car driver
- Charles Zwolsman Sr. (1955 – 2011), Dutch drug dealer, race car driver and racing team owner
