= Richard Piper =

British former racing driver (born 1947)

Richard Piper (born 22 October 1947) is a British former racing driver.

Piper drove in the British Formula Atlantic championship from 1979 to 1981. He raced part-time in the World Sportscar Championship from 1985 to 1992, then drove in the 24 Hours of Le Mans in 1993 and 1994. He drove in the Historic Formula One Championship in 2008 and drove a vintage Theodore Racing Formula One car in historic events in 2010 after driving a Lola T332 Formula 5000 car in 2009.

== 24 Hours of Le Mans results ==
Year	Class	No	Tyres	Car	Team	Co-Drivers	Laps	Pos.	Class Pos.
1990	C2	116	G	Spice SE89C; Ford Cosworth DFL 3.3L V8	(United Kingdom) PC Automotive	(France) Olindo Iacobelli (United Kingdom) Mike Youles	304	21st	1st
1991	C1	43	G	Spice SE89C; Ford Cosworth DFZ 3.5L V8	(Netherlands) Euro Racing (United Kingdom) PC Automotive	(France) Olindo Iacobelli (France) Jean-Louis Ricci	280	NC	NC
1992	C1	22	G	Spice SE89C; Ford Cosworth DFZ 3.5L V8	(United Kingdom) Chamberlain Engineering	(France) Ferdinand de Lesseps (France) Olindo Iacobelli	258	14th	7th
1993	GT	44	D	Lotus Esprit S300; Lotus 2.2L Turbo I4	(United Kingdom) Lotus Sport (United Kingdom) Chamberlain Engineering	(France) Olindo Iacobelli (France) Ferdinand de Lesseps	162	DNF	DNF
1994	GT2	62	MI	Lotus Esprit S300; Lotus 2.2L Turbo I4	(United Kingdom) Lotus Sport (United Kingdom) Chamberlain Engineering	(United Kingdom) Peter Hardman (France) Olindo Iacobelli	59	DNF	DNF
1995	GT1	57	D	Jaguar XJ220; Jaguar JV6 3.5 L Turbo V6	(United Kingdom) PC Automotive Jaguar	(United Kingdom) Tiff Needell (United Kingdom) James Weaver	135	DNF	DNF
