= 1992 500 km of Magny-Cours =

Layout of the Circuit de Nevers Magny-Cours (1992-2002)

The 1992 500 km of Magny-Cours was the final race of the FIA Sportscar World Championship for both the 1992 season and overall as the championship failed the materialize for 1993. It was run on October 18, 1992.

Peugeot used this home race to show off their new second evolution of the 905, running it for a few laps in practice before it was withdrawn. Peugeot instead ran a third 905 Evo 1B for the home crowd in the race. With the demise of the SWC, the 905 Evo 2 was never raced in competition. Euro Racing withdrew from the event following scrutineering after the arrest of team owner Charles Zwolsman.

== Qualifying ==
=== Qualifying results ===
Class leaders are in bold. The fastest time set by each entry is denoted in gray.

Pos.	Class	No.	Team	Qualifying 1	Qualifying 2	Gap
1	C1	2	**(France) Peugeot Talbot Sport**	**1:16.415**	1:19.821	
2	C1	1	(France) Peugeot Talbot Sport	1:18.063	**1:18.046**	+1.631
3	C1	71	(France) Peugeot Talbot Sport	1:20.441	1:18.254	+1.839
4	C1	7	(Japan) Toyota Team Tom's	1:19.755	1:19.657	+3.242
5	C1	8	(Japan) Toyota Team Tom's	1:19.719	1:20.125	+3.304
6	C1	5	(Japan) Mazdaspeed	1:22.228	1:23.454	+5.813
7	FIA Cup	29	**(Italy) Team S.C.I.**	1:35.852	**1:31.849**	+15.434
8	FIA Cup	22	(United Kingdom) Chamberlain Engineering	**1:33.142**	No Time	+16.727
WD	C1	3	(Netherlands) Euro Racing	No Time	No Time	N/A
WD	C1	4	(Netherlands) Euro Racing	No Time	No Time	N/A

== Race ==
=== Race results ===
Class winners in bold. Cars failing to complete 90% of winner's distance marked as Not Classified (NC).

Pos	Class	No	Team	Drivers	Chassis	Tyre	Laps
Pos	Class	No	Team	Drivers	Engine	Tyre	Laps
1	**C1**	**2**	**(France) Peugeot Talbot Sport**	**(Italy) Mauro Baldi (France) Philippe Alliot**	**Peugeot 905 Evo 1B**	MI	**118**
1	**C1**	**2**	**(France) Peugeot Talbot Sport**	**(Italy) Mauro Baldi (France) Philippe Alliot**	**Peugeot SA35 3.5L V10**	MI	**118**
2	C1	71	(France) Peugeot Talbot Sport	(France) Christophe Bouchut (France) Éric Hélary	Peugeot 905 Evo 1B	MI	116
2	C1	71	(France) Peugeot Talbot Sport	(France) Christophe Bouchut (France) Éric Hélary	Peugeot SA35 3.5L V10	MI	116
3	C1	7	(Japan) Toyota Team Tom's	(United Kingdom) Geoff Lees (Netherlands) Jan Lammers	Toyota TS010	G	114
3	C1	7	(Japan) Toyota Team Tom's	(United Kingdom) Geoff Lees (Netherlands) Jan Lammers	Toyota RV10 3.5L V10	G	114
4	C1	8	(Japan) Toyota Team Tom's	(United Kingdom) Andy Wallace (Australia) David Brabham	Toyota TS010	G	113
4	C1	8	(Japan) Toyota Team Tom's	(United Kingdom) Andy Wallace (Australia) David Brabham	Toyota RV10 3.5L V10	G	113
5	C1	1	(France) Peugeot Talbot Sport	(United Kingdom) Derek Warwick (France) Yannick Dalmas	Peugeot 905 Evo 1B	G	113
5	C1	1	(France) Peugeot Talbot Sport	(United Kingdom) Derek Warwick (France) Yannick Dalmas	Peugeot SA35 3.5L V10	G	113
6	C1	5	(Japan) Mazdaspeed	(Brazil) Maurizio Sandro Sala (Italy) Alex Caffi	Mazda MXR-01	MI	107
6	C1	5	(Japan) Mazdaspeed	(Brazil) Maurizio Sandro Sala (Italy) Alex Caffi	Mazda (Judd) MV10 3.5L V10	MI	107
7	**FIA; Cup**	**22**	**(United Kingdom) Chamberlain Engineering**	**(France) Ferdinand de Lesseps (United Kingdom) Nick Adams**	**Spice SE89C**	G	**98**
7	**FIA; Cup**	**22**	**(United Kingdom) Chamberlain Engineering**	**(France) Ferdinand de Lesseps (United Kingdom) Nick Adams**	**Ford Cosworth DFZ 3.5L V8**	G	**98**
8	FIA; Cup	29	(Italy) Team S.C.I.	(Italy) Ranieri Randaccio (Italy) Stefano Sebastiani "Stingbrace"	Spice SE90C	G	93
8	FIA; Cup	29	(Italy) Team S.C.I.	(Italy) Ranieri Randaccio (Italy) Stefano Sebastiani "Stingbrace"	Ford Cosworth DFR 3.5L V8	G	93

== Statistics ==
- Pole Position - #2 Peugeot Talbot Sport - 1:16.415 - Philippe Alliot.
- Fastest Lap - #1 Peugeot Talbot Sport
- Average Speed - 183.111 km/h

World Sportscar Championship
Previous race: 1992 1000km of Suzuka	1992 season	Next race: None
