= Shunji Kasuya =

Japanese racing driver

- Nationality: Japanese
- Born: 24 January 1962 (age 64)
- Wins: 3

Previous series
- 1991–1992: Formula Crane 45

24 Hours of Le Mans career
- Years: 1994 24 Hours of Le Mans
- Teams: Clayton Cunningham Racing
- Best finish: DNF
- Class wins: 0

Shunji Kasuya (born 24 January 1962) is a Japanese former racing driver.

== Racing record ==
=== 24 Hours of Le Mans results ===
| Year | Team | Co-Drivers | Car | Class | Laps | Pos. | Class Pos. |
|---|---|---|---|---|---|---|---|
| 1989 | (France) Courage Compétition | (France) Jean-Claude Andruet (France) Philippe Farjon | Cougar C20B | C2 | 312 | 14th | 1st |
| 1990 | (Japan) Trust Racing Team | (South Africa) George Fouché (Sweden) Steven Andskär | Porsche 962C | C1 | 330 | 13th | 13th |
| 1991 | (Netherlands) Euro Racing | (United Kingdom) Justin Bell | Spice SE88P | C2 | - | DNQ | DNQ |
| 1992 | (Netherlands) Euro Racing | (Germany) Heinz-Harald Frentzen (Netherlands) Charles Zwolsman sr. | Lola T92/10 | C1 | 271 | 13th | 6th |
| 1994 | (United States) Clayton Cunningham Racing | (United States) Paul Gentilozzi (Belgium) Eric van de Poele | Nissan 300ZX Turbo | IMSA; GTS | 25 | DNF | DNF |
| 1995 | (Japan) Nismo | (Japan) Hideo Fukuyama (Japan) Masahiko Kondo | Nismo Skyline GT-R LM | LMGT1 | 271 | 10th | 5th |
