= Olindo Iacobelli =

Italian racing driver

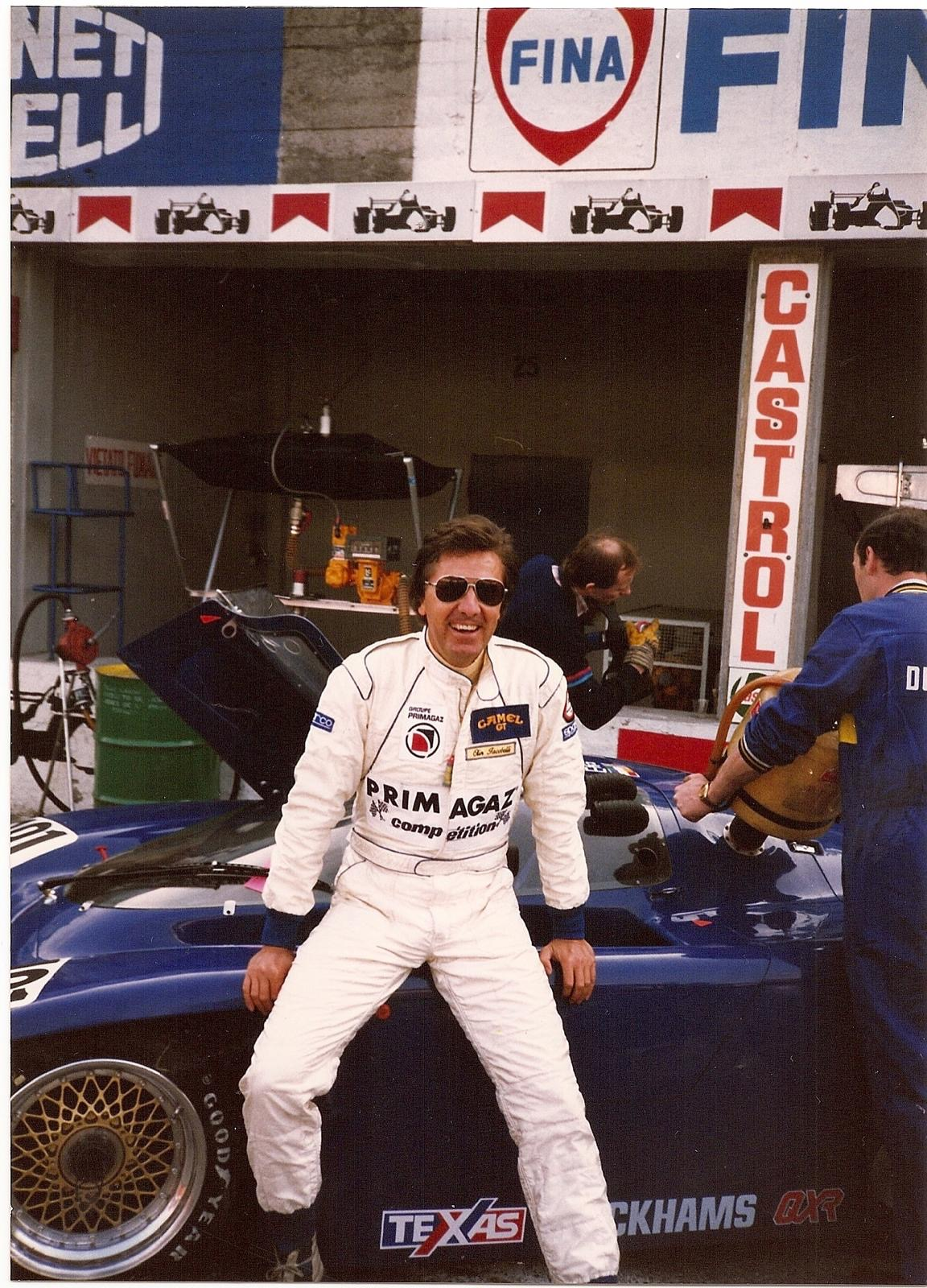
Olindo Iacobelli, before the start of the 1000 km of Monza with his Argo Cosworth.

Olindo Iacobelli is an Italian American former business executive and race car driver. His career includes holding several executive positions and ultimately at age 47 becoming President of Mead Packaging Europe, Africa, and the Middle East. At the same time, he raced in over 300 races worldwide, being victorious in 32. In 1990, he won the category C2 of the 24 Hours of Le Mans (24 Heures du Mans). He also drove for the Chamberlain Engineering Racing Team that won the 1992 World Sportscar Championship. Iacobelli’s professional expertise has been manifested in various other endeavors like tennis management, classic car collection, and art company management.

== Career ==
A graduate of the University of Michigan and Harvard Business School, Iacobelli’s professional career at Mead Packaging began in Atlanta, Georgia. This included positions as Planning and Financial Manager of Mead Europe, President of a Mead Packaging Italian joint venture with Buitoni, President of the French subsidiary for Mead, then Vice President for Mead Packaging Europe, Africa, and the Middle East operations. At 47 years old, he became Mead’s President for Europe, Africa and the Middle East. During his tenure at Mead Europe, he was recognized as one of the corporation’s most successful, innovative and entrepreneurial leaders, which resulted in his quick rise through Mead’s executive leadership.

In the 1990s under Iacobelli’s Presidency, Mead Packaging Europe was the first packaging company to use AI by buying computer programs like the ones used by NASA. They were able to simulate the development of new, high speed, flexible packaging machines in Chateauroux, France at Mead Europe Engineering. In addition, they hired engineers from totally different industries to bring new ideas, new materials in order to think outside the box, resulting in reduced costs of the prototypes and even more important, dramatically reducing the development time.

In a 2004 Dairy Foods article, Iacobelli describes the use of cutting edge techniques involving Cluster-Clip™, Strong-Pak™, and Cluster-Pak™ packaging, stating that Danone’s “Actimel soon became a consumer favorite and I believe our cartons helped provide a competitive advantage by enhancing shelf presence, convenience and product availability”. The early use of artificial intelligence in developing tailor-made, flexible packaging machinery resulted in hundreds of patents and hundreds of millions of dollars in new revenue, placing Mead as the largest world manufacturer of beverage multi-packaging.

Simply stated, Mead’s business proposition to customers was: you provide the product and we will create a multiple package that will enhance your image and help you increase your sales. Mead would provide the printed packages made from the craft board grown from its own trees that would run on Mead machines installed in their plants and give them round-the-clock service.

After the merger of Mead and Westvaco internationally in early 2002, the combined company became the global leader of product packaging in over 70 countries. During this time Mead Westvaco continued to be listed in the Global 500 list of largest international companies.

== Racing ==
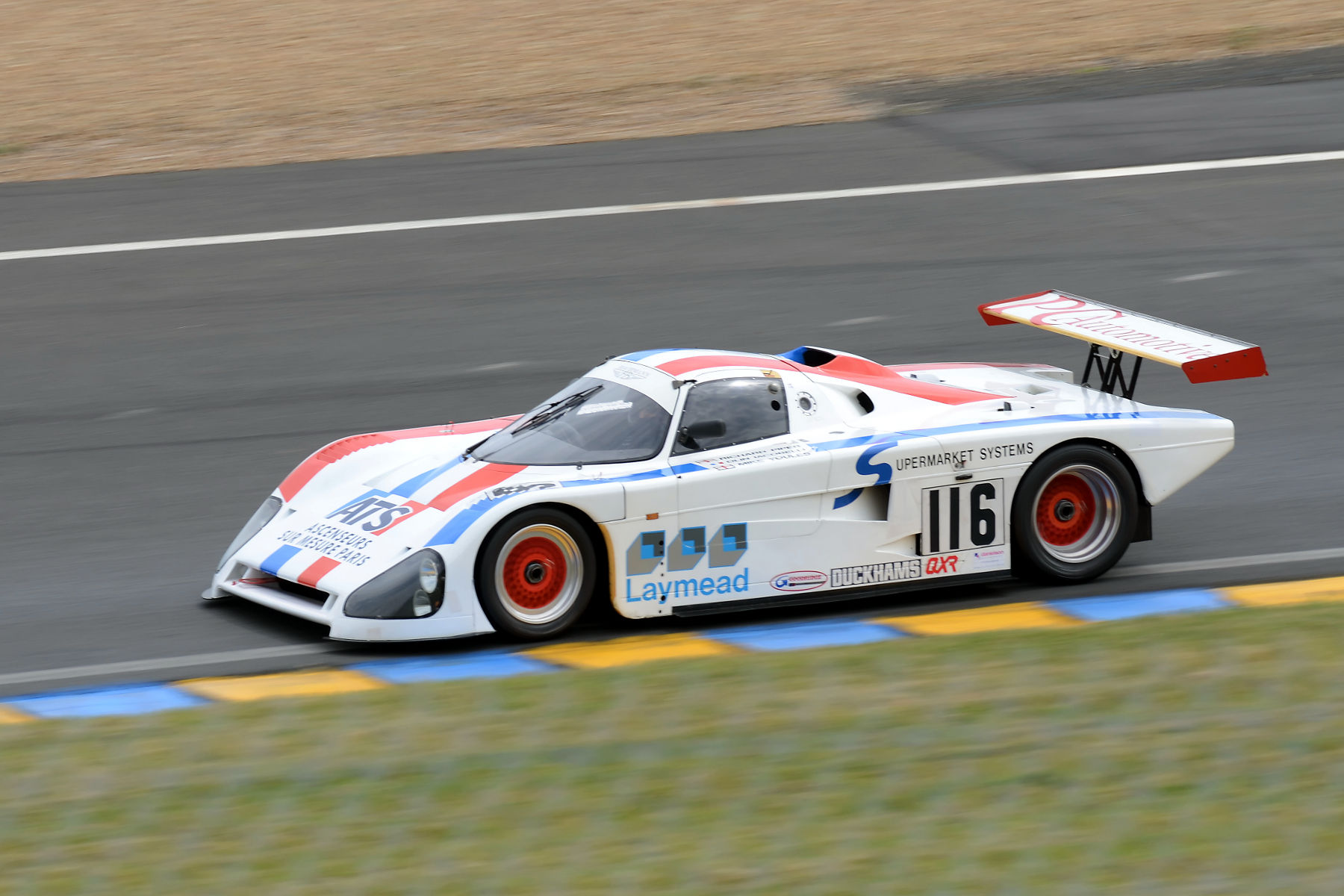
Spice SE89C - PC Automotive - 24 Hours of Le Mans 1990

While living in Italy and France, Iacobelli started fulfilling a car racing passion. What began as a hobby, the amateur race car driver was soon faced with many offers to race for professional teams. This led to participating in over 300 races in the most famous racetracks in the world, such as Fuji (Japan), Kyalami (South Africa), Hermano Rodriguez (Mexico), Daytona (USA), Monza (Italy), Silverstone (England), and of course the famous Le Mans (France). During his 17 years of racing, he won 65 trophies.

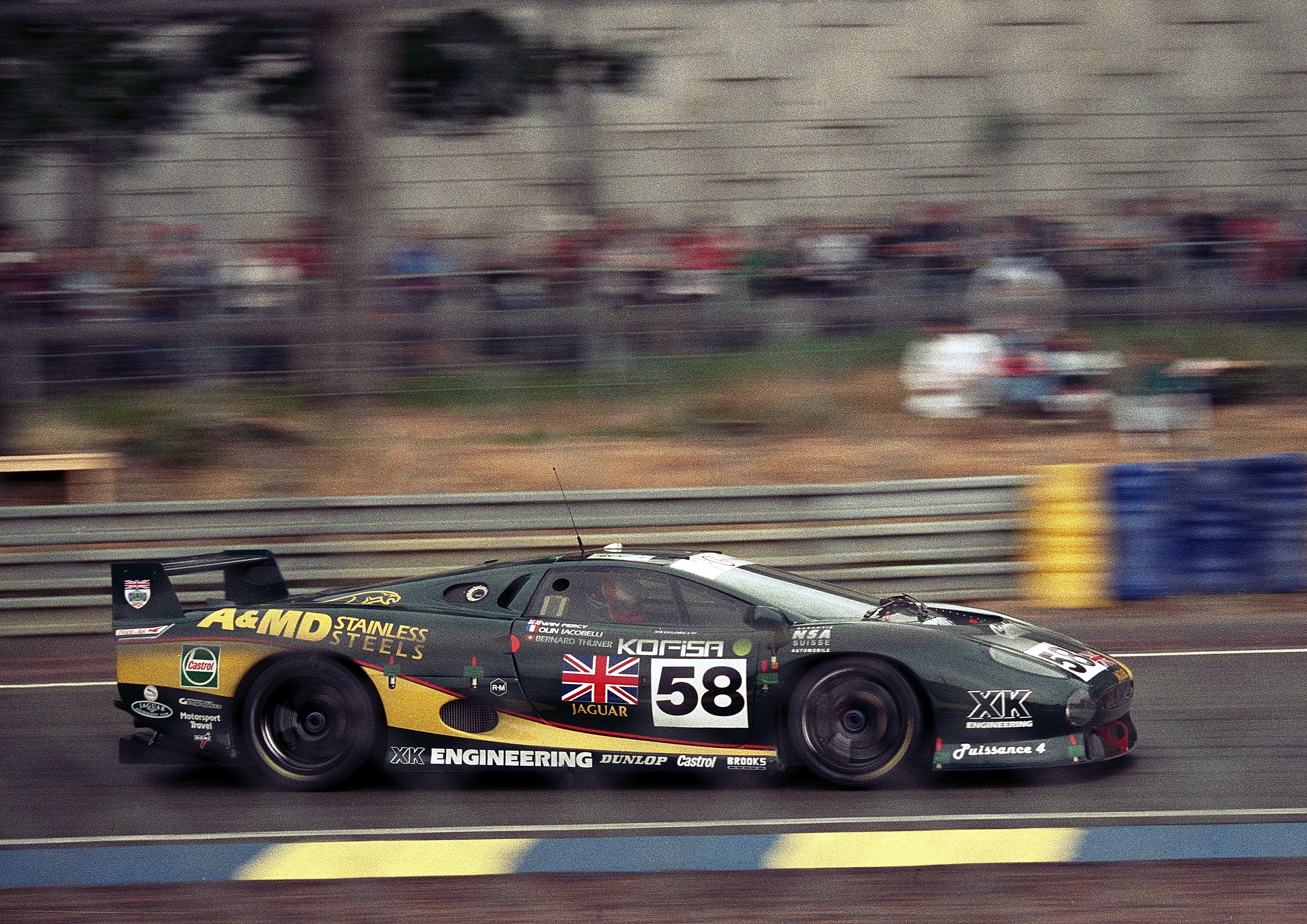
Jaguar XJ220 - Bernard Thuner, Olindo Iacobelli & Win Percy at Le mans 1995

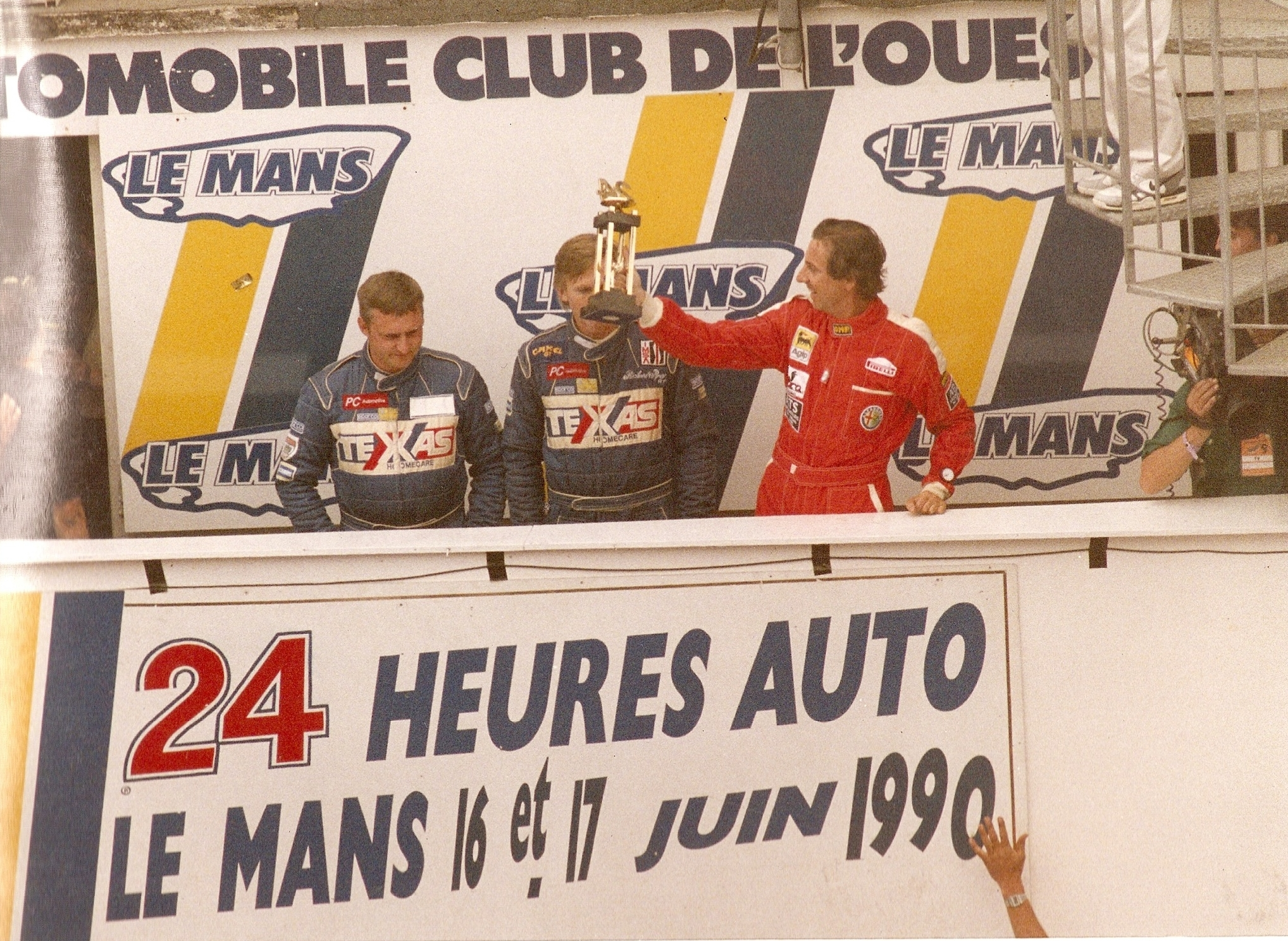
24 hours of Le Mans 1990

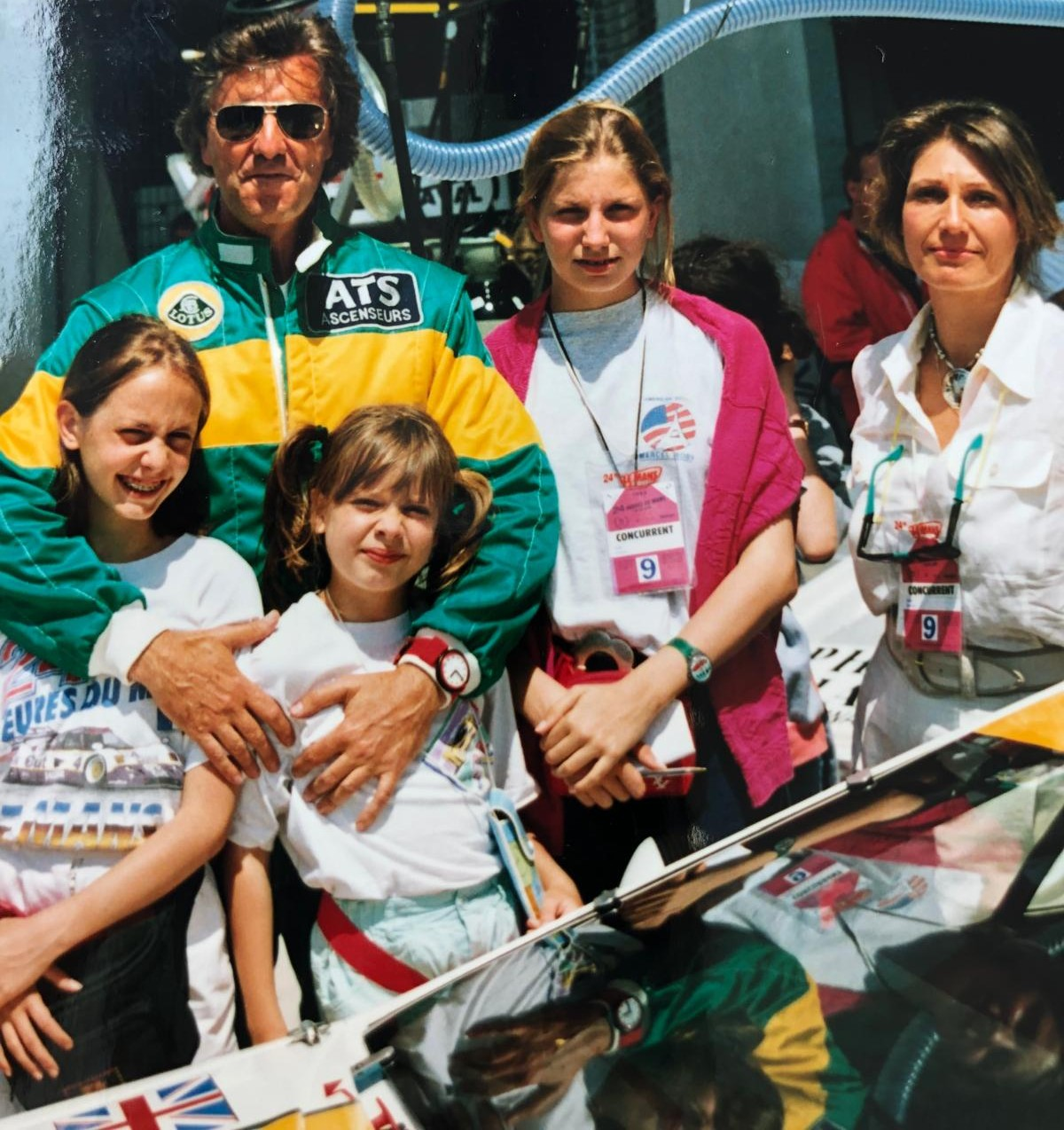
Olindo and family, Le Mans 1994

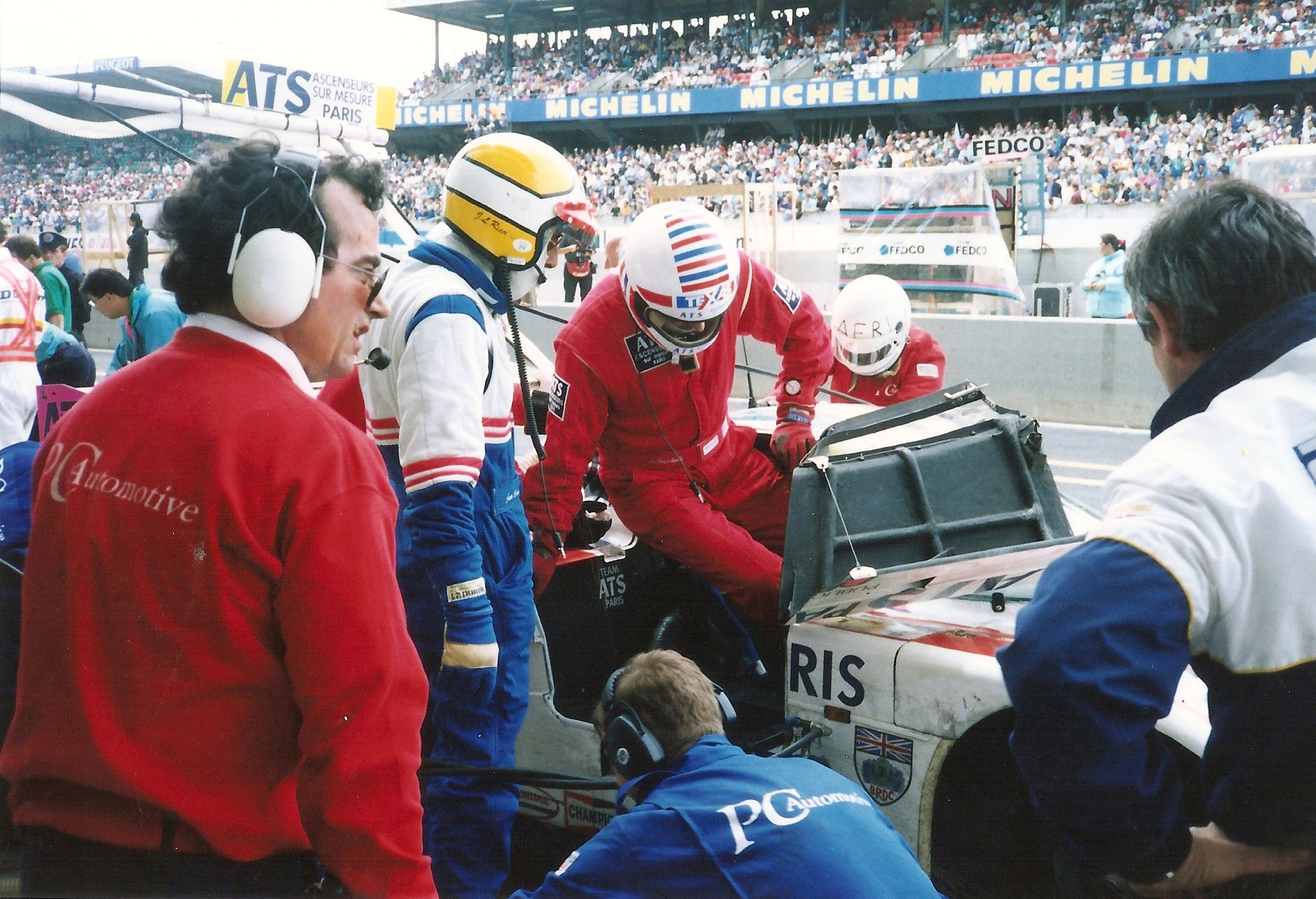
Le Mans 1992 Olindo driver change

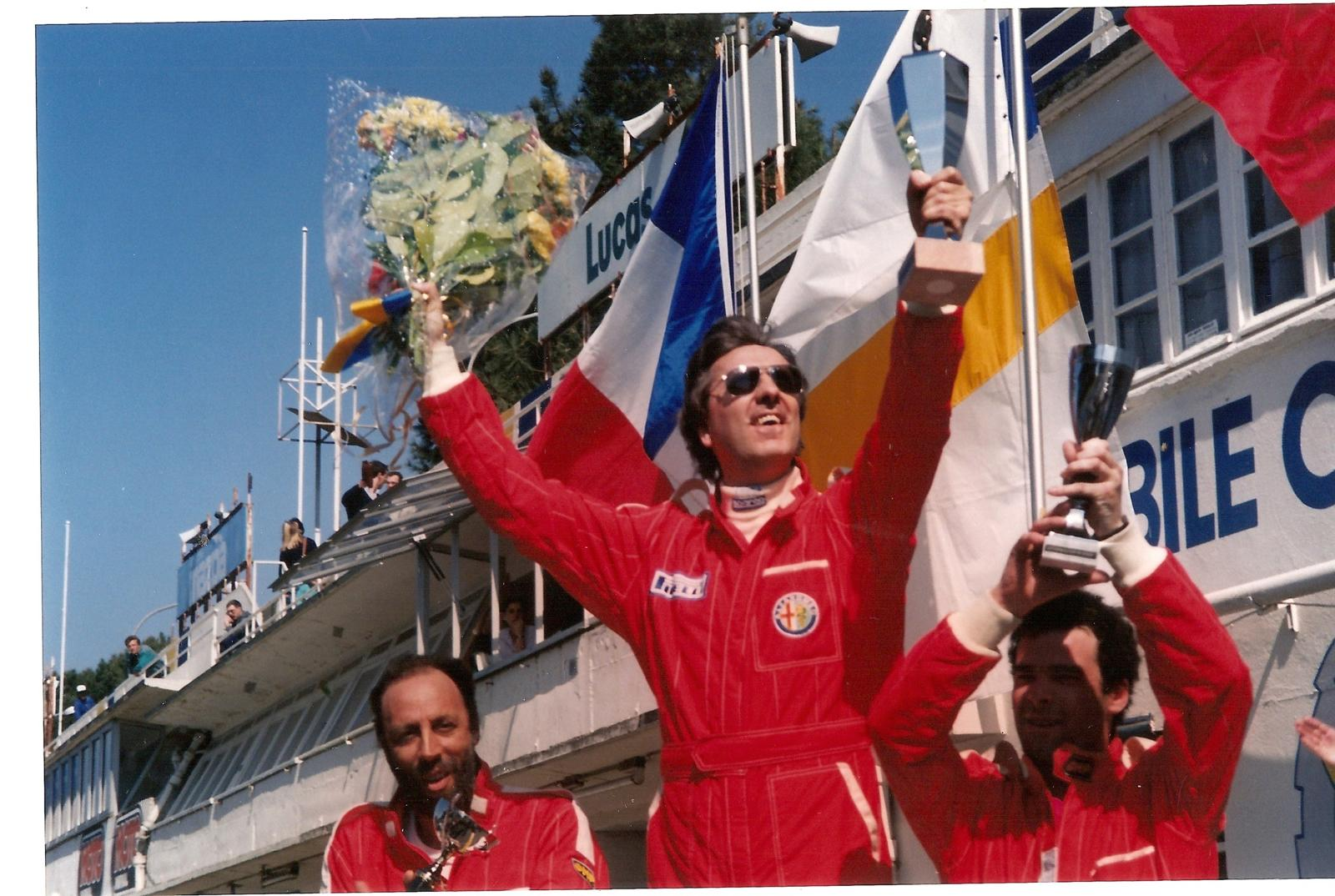
Circuit Bugatti, France, Alfa Romeo 3lt

== Classic Car Collection ==
In the 1980s, Iacobelli began to collect cars as a passion but also as an investment for the future. His wife, Carolyn, who was an artist and loved the design of Italian sports cars, played a very important role in the collection. She did not intend to sell any of them, so for her it was never a business, just a pleasure to be able to ride them and above all, to admire them. The lines dreamed by Bertone, Pininfarina, and Zagato, and Marcello Gandini, who with the Lamborghini Countach presented at the 1974 Geneva Motor Show, revolutionized car design that inspired car designers around the world.

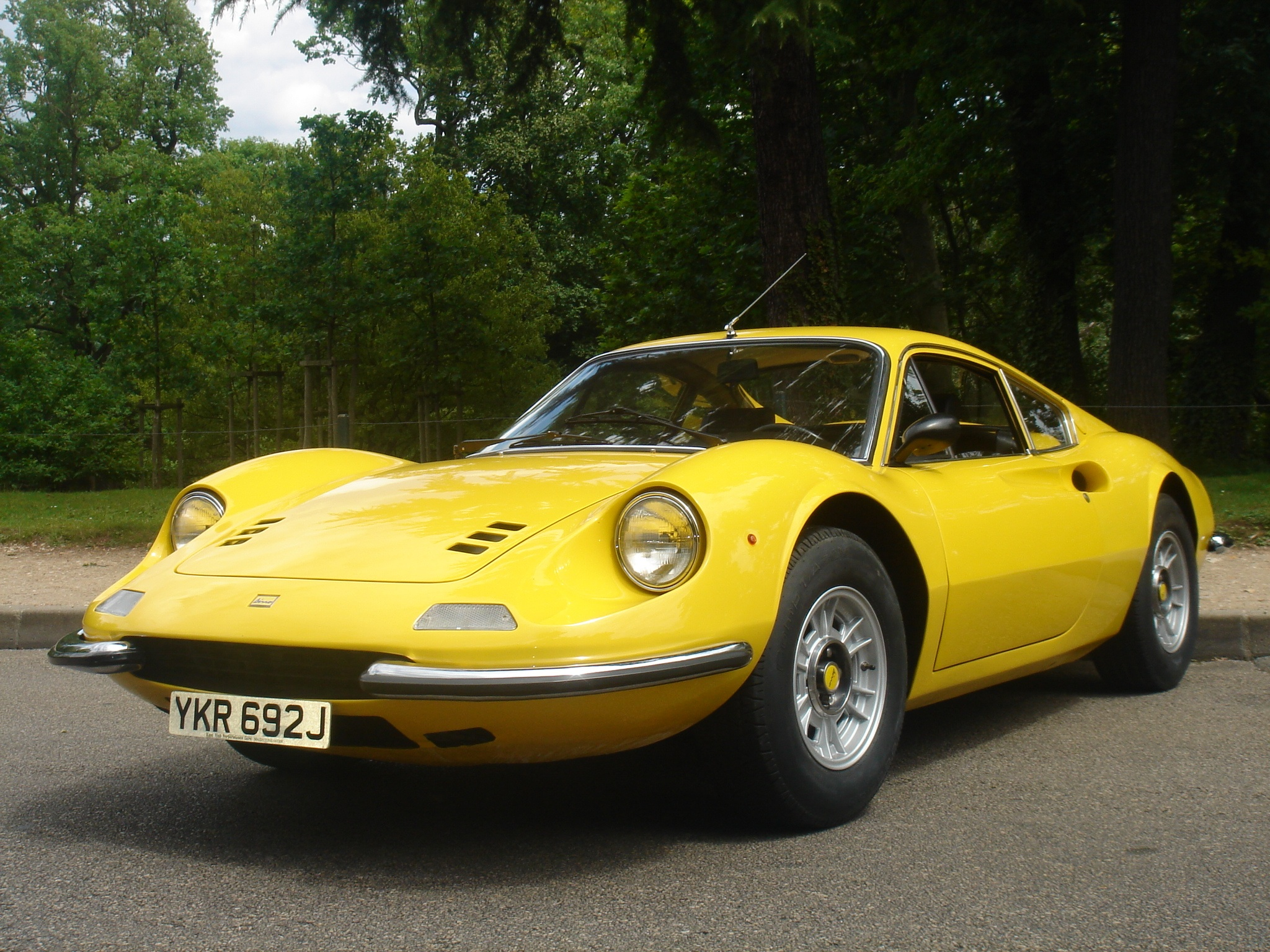
Ferrari Dino 1972

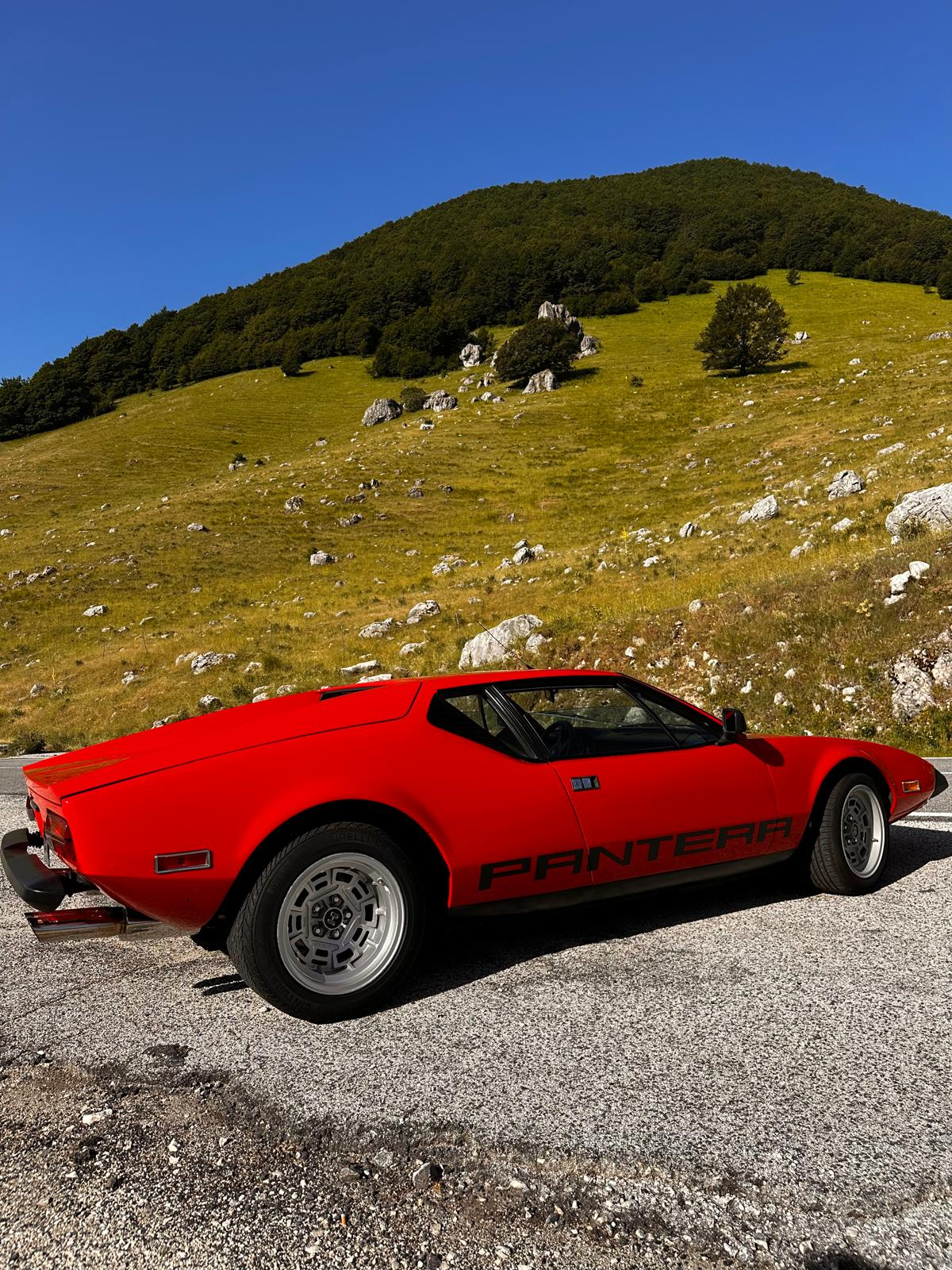
De Tomaso Pantera GTS 1973

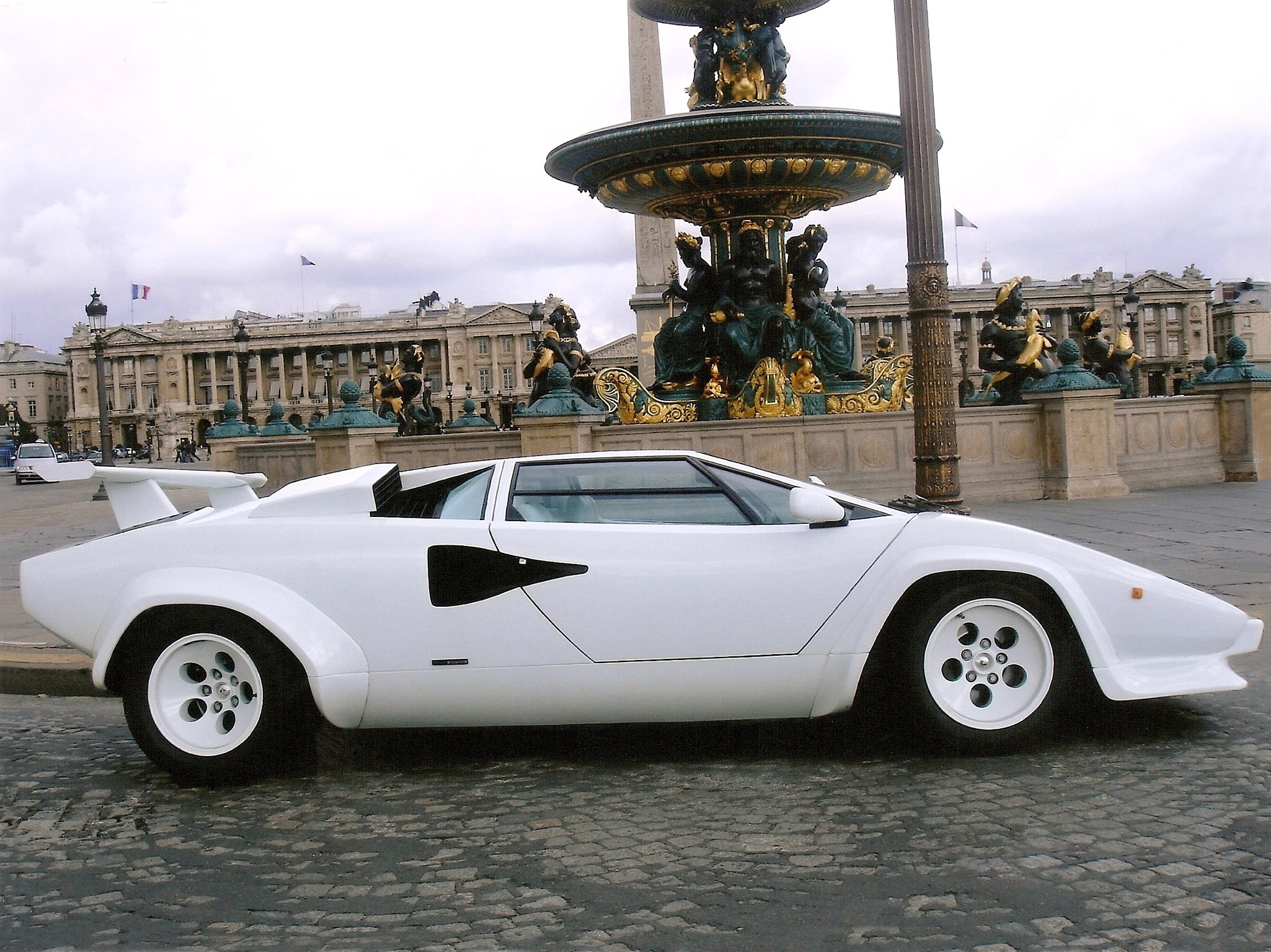
Lamborghini Countach Quattrovalvole 1987

== Tennis ==
After leaving Mead Packaging Europe in 2005, Iacobelli began a new career in professional tennis. In his new venture, he and his associate Giorgio Brasero concentrated on the management of young players using a personalized approach which differentiated them from larger management companies (like IMG).

Iacobelli and Brasero built a nucleus around the players, freeing them from everyday obligations and responsibilities (training, tournaments, sponsors, media, travel, etc.) allowing them to focus entirely on exercising their talents. The approach helped Gaudio, Puerta, Mathieu, Bolelli, Andujar, Delbonis, Sanchez, Halep, and other great players to achieve great success, winning numerous ATP tournaments ranging from 250 to grand slams like the French Open won by Gaston Gaudio in 2004.

In 2010, Iacobelli became one of the original partners in the Masia Tennis Academy in Valencia, Spain with the mission of creating the champions of the future. The academy trained young boys and girls from all over the world with the best tennis instructors and physical trainers available.

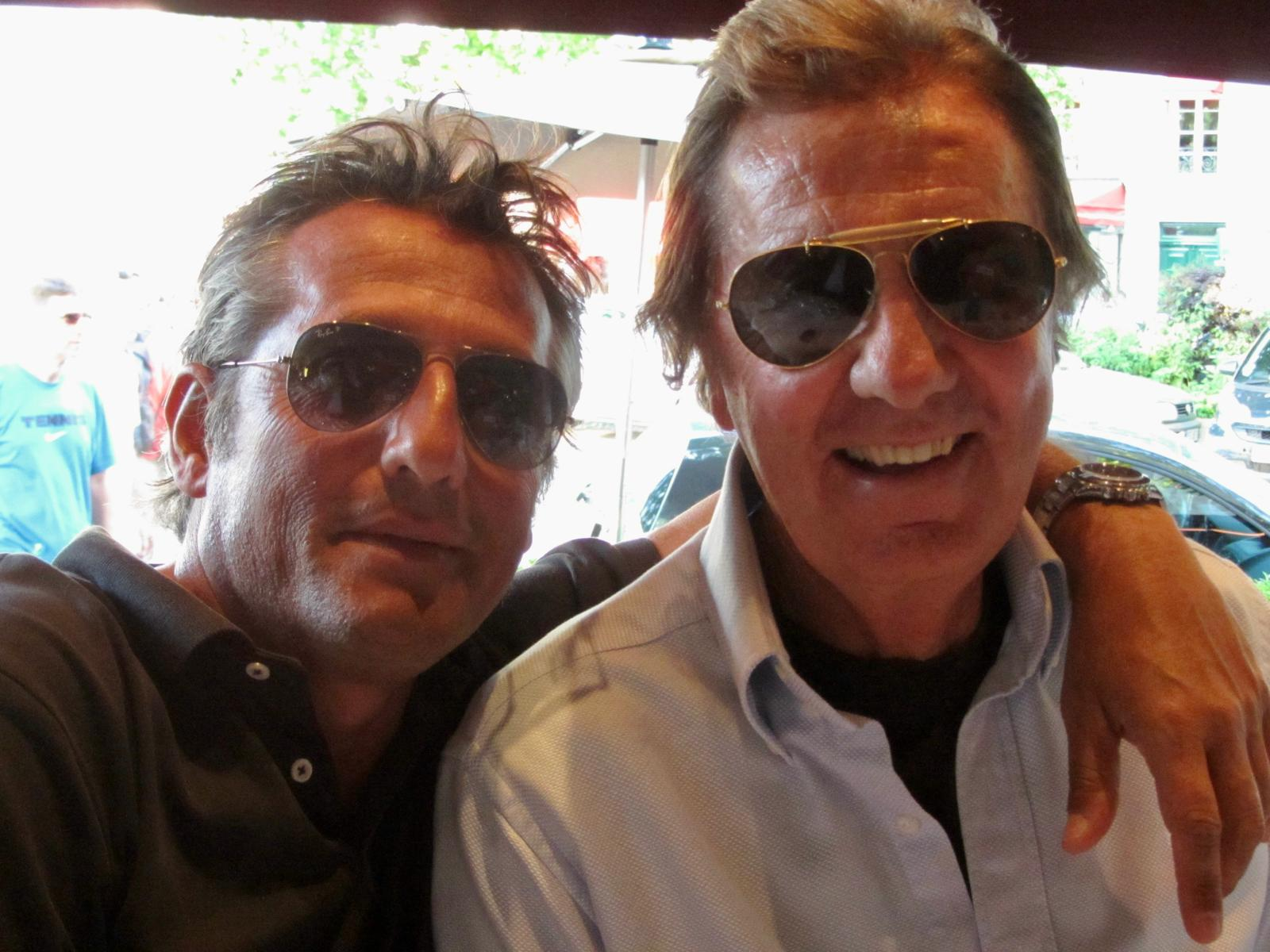
Giorgio Brasero and Olindo Iacobelli

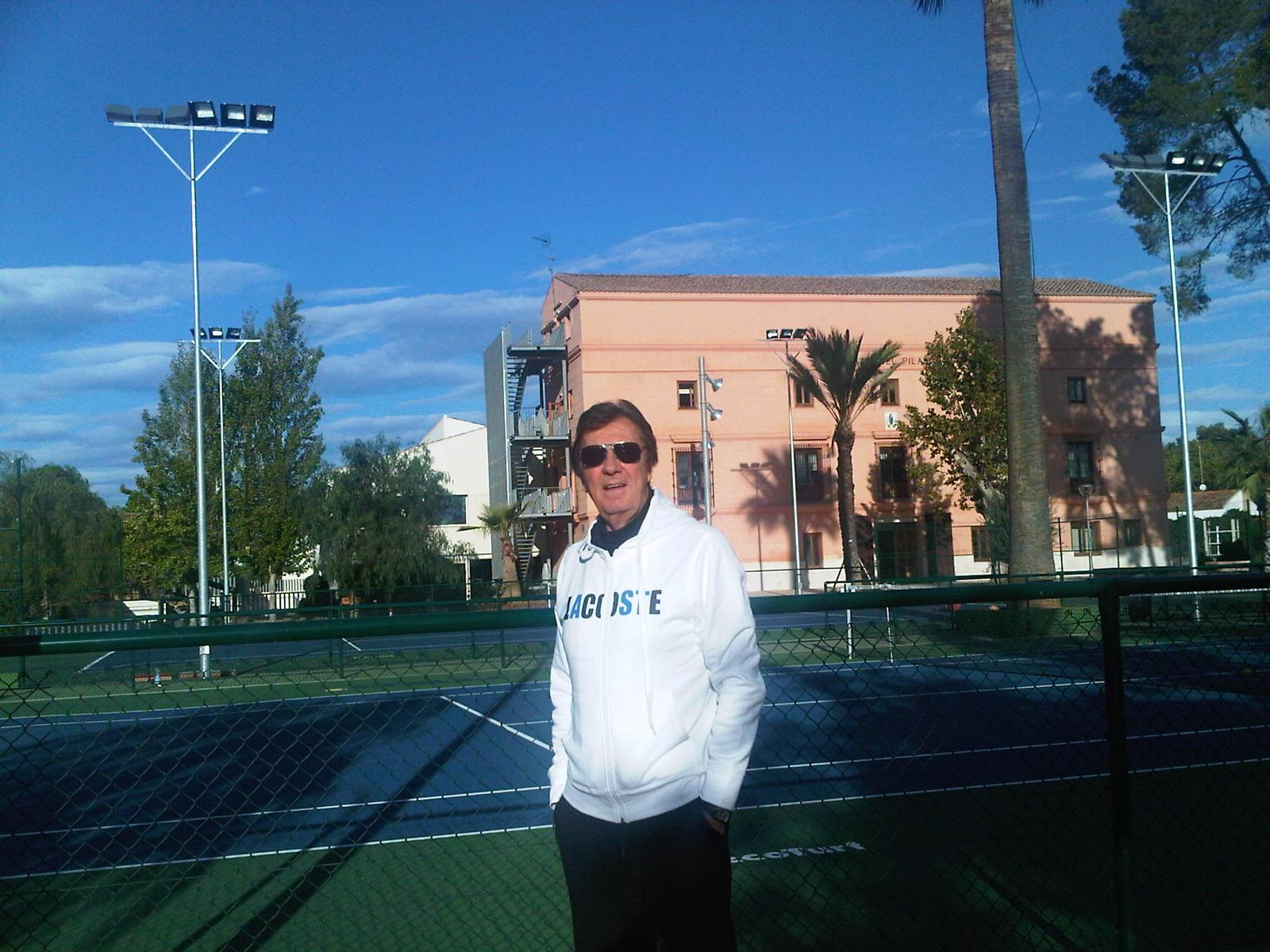
Olindo Iacobelli at Masia Tennis Academy, Valencia, Spain

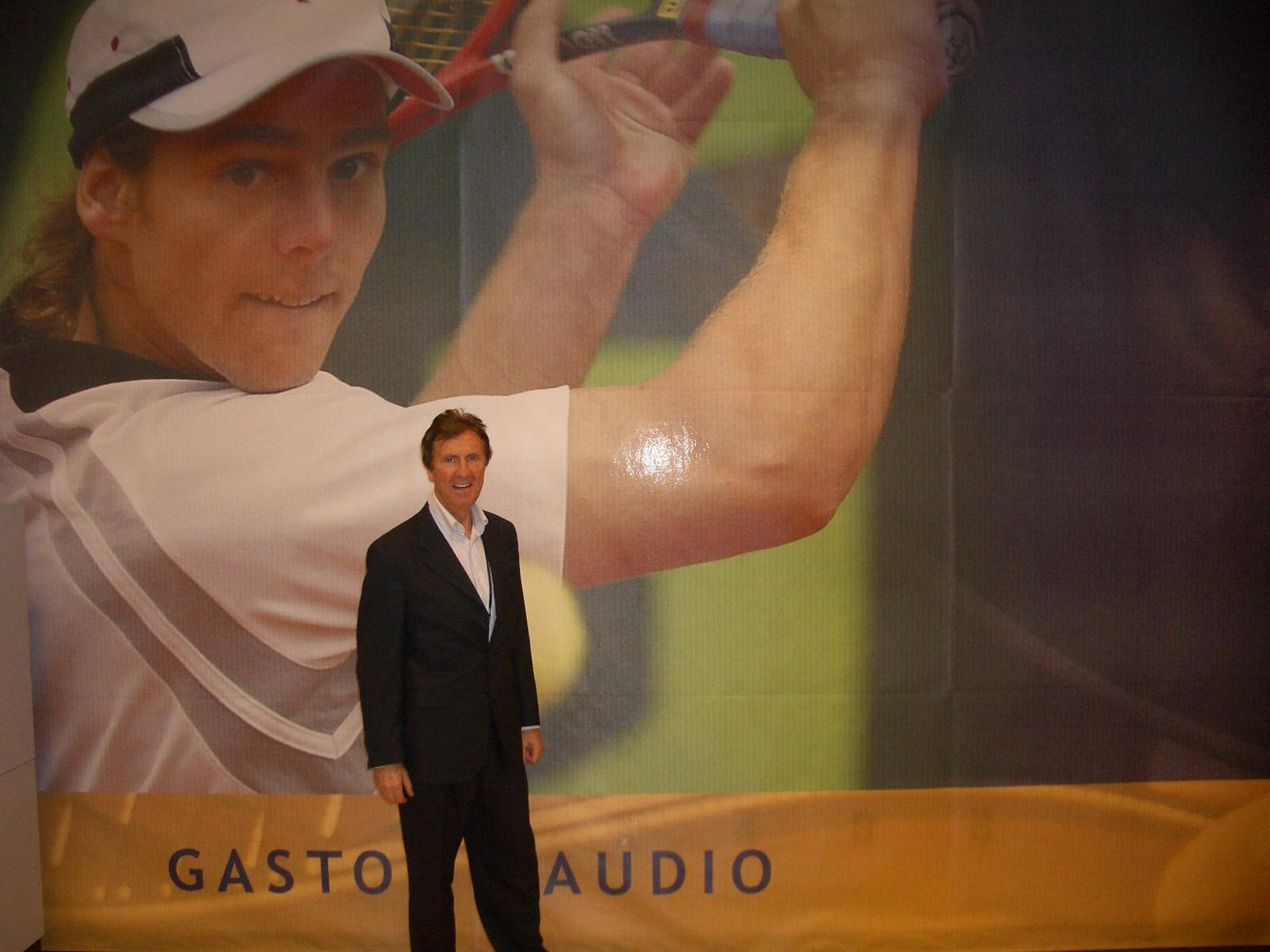
Olindo Iacobelli in front of poster of Gaston Gaudio at Masters Tennis Cup, Houston 2005

== Art ==
After 17 years in the tennis business and victories all over the world, Iacobelli moved on to forming a unique international art company, Arsprimi LLC, with the mission to help talented artists become famous during their lifetime. The first artist, Rori Ianni (Rori Art and Rori Creations), winner of many international awards, finally obtained a commission from the Vatican to create a new tabernacle in 2024 for a historical basilica in Italy (Basilica–Santuario, Santa Maria di Canneto, Settefrati, Italy, a pilgrimage site documented as early as 714 AD).
