= Charles Zwolsman Sr. =

Dutch drug trafficker and racecar driver

- Nationality: (Netherlands) Dutch
- Born: 6 August 1955 Oostzaan, Netherlands
- Died: 21 January 2011 (aged 55) Nieuwegein, Netherlands

Charles Zwolsman (6 August 1955 – 21 January 2011) was a Dutch drug dealer and professional racecar driver and team owner.

== Drug dealing ==
Zwolsman was born in Oostzaan, and started dealing in marijuana in the 1980s. He built an organization of about 60 people and between 1989 and 1993 alone smuggled at least 44 tonne from Morocco and Spain to Holland and England. Starting in 1994, Zwolsman was arrested multiple times for drug smuggling and money laundering. His final conviction was in a 2010 for possession of 2,000 kilos of hashish and four firearms in 2006. He received a three-year sentence, but died in his cell in Nieuwegein, aged 55, in 2011.

== Racing career ==
Zwolsman competed in the World Sportscar Championship in 1991 finishing 6th overall in the driver standings, running his own team (Euroracing) with a chassis from Spice Engineering. He attempted the series again in 1992 fielding a Lola T92/10, but failed to score a point. However his Euroracing team finished 5th in the championship. The series folded the next year. He competed from 1990 to 1992 in the 24 Hours of Le Mans, having his best result in 1992 when he teamed with Heinz-Harald Frentzen and Shunji Kasuya to finish 13th. In 1992 he also competed in the Interserie, winning one race and finishing 10th in the drivers' standings. Zwolsman's son Charles Jr. would follow his father into motorsports, also competing in Le Mans as well as Formula Three and Champ Car.

=== 24 Hours of Le Mans Result ===
Year	Class	Team	Team mates	Car	Engine	Pos	Class Pos
1990	C2	(United Kingdom) Chamberlain Engineering	(France) Philippe de Henning (United Kingdom) Robin Donovan	Spice SE90C	Ford Cosworth DFZ 3.5L V8	31 (DNF)	6 (DNF)
1991	C1	(Netherlands) Euro Racing	(Netherlands) Cor Euser (United Kingdom) Tim Harvey	Spice SE90C	Ford Cosworth DFZ 3.5L V8	31 (DNF)	5 (DNF)
1992	C1	(Netherlands) Euro Racing	(Germany) Heinz-Harald Frentzen (Japan) Shunji Kasuya	Lola T92/10	Judd GV10 3.5L V10	13	6
1992	C1	(Netherlands) Euro Racing	(Netherlands) Cor Euser (Spain) Jesús Pareja	Lola T92/10	Judd GV10 3.5L V10	25 (DNF)	14 (DNF)
