= Lola T92/10 =

Sports car

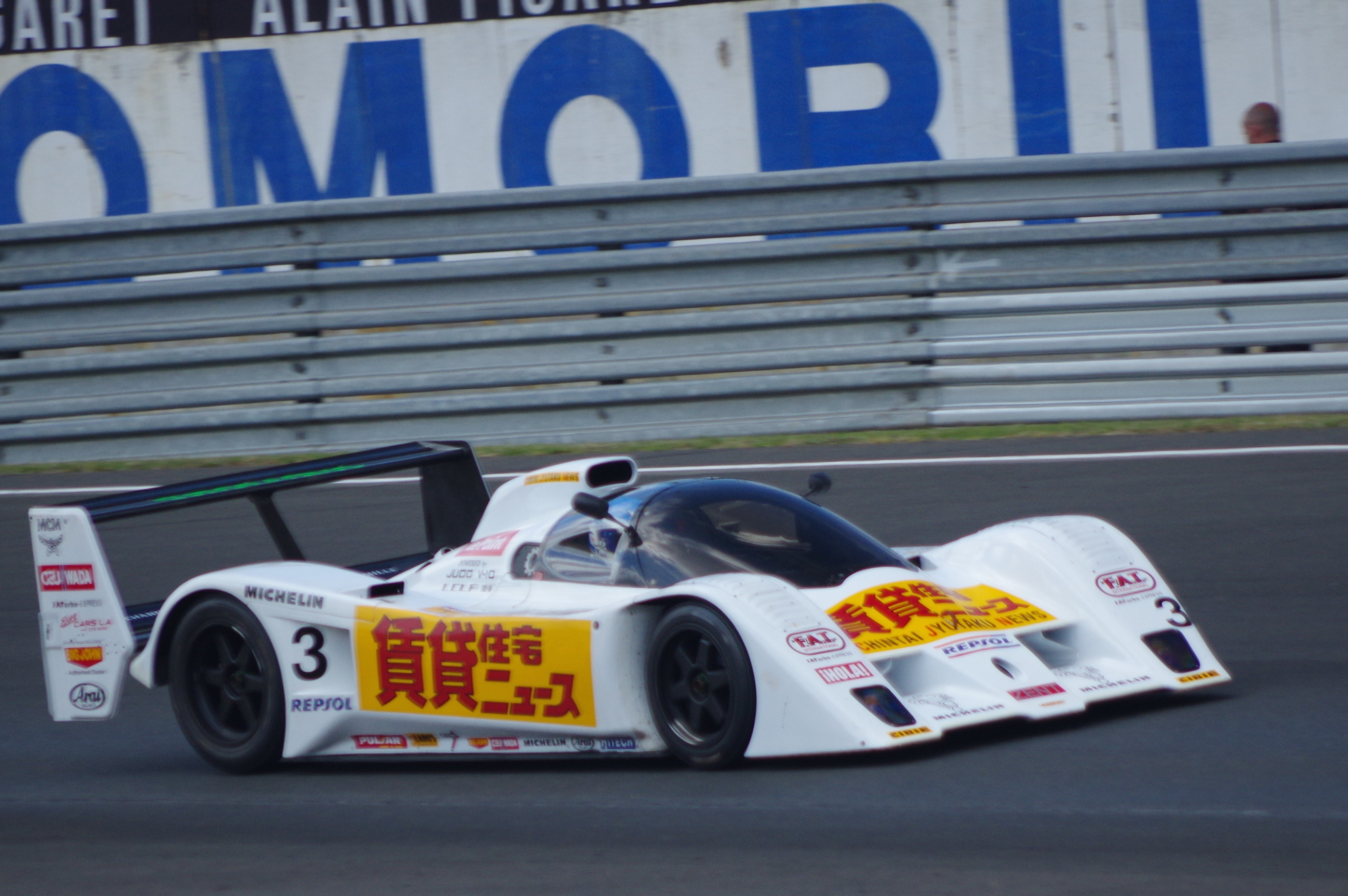
1992 Lola T92/10 Group C racing at Le Mans Classic 2016

The Lola T92/10 (also briefly known as the Lola 981) was a Group C sports car developed by Lola Cars as a customer chassis for the 1992 World Sportscar Championship season. It would be the final sports car built by Lola until their return in 1998.

== Development ==
Following years of success building prototypes for Chevrolet in the IMSA GTP series as well as Nissan in the World Sportscar Championship and All Japan Sports Prototype Championship, Lola ended the 1991 season without a major manufacturer to back their sports car effort. Lola was therefore left to develop a car with the intent of allowing customers to buy a complete package, rather than relying on a major automobile manufacturer to dictate the car's design.

Chief Designer Wiet Huidekoper started with a clean sheet of paper for the T92/10 and following extensive windtunnel development with scale models, achieving extraordinarily high down-force (negative lift) figures combined with modest drag, giving the car a very high L/D ("lift-to-drag") ratio. The car had a much smaller windscreen and cockpit roof section than Lola's previous Group C designs. The new car had two large air intakes on the nose, which provided the air for engine cooling and to cool the brakes. These sat much farther back than on the previous Lola designs in order to improve aerodynamics and to increase cooling. This made for a small flat nose which gave the Lola T92/10 its distinctive look. An engine inlet would be added to the roof of the car, given that the T92/10s would be normally aspirated. The sculpted sidepods were a departure from the norm. The rear would also be radically different from the previous Lola designed Nissan Group C car, supporting a tall wing instead of the single element wing that had been previously used. The car featured an exhaust-blown diffuser.

For an engine, Lola would turn to Judd to supply a motor to meet the then new 3.5 litre requirements for Group C. Judd would use their Formula One V10 engine, though dubbed the GV10 in the sportscar application. Its compact design allowed for much tighter bodywork on the Lola and was powerful enough to compete with the major manufacturers of the World Sportscar Championship.

A model of the T92/10 was unveiled to the public for the first time at the 1991 430km of Nürburgring.

Only a total of three T92/10s were built, as the Group C category was cancelled by the FIA in April 1992. This stifled the development of the car, as there was no longer any incentive of potential future sales.

== Racing history ==
=== Euro Racing ===
Charles Zwolsman of the Netherlands would become the primary customer of the T92/10, his Euro Racing squad purchasing the first two chassis for use in the 1992 World Sportscar Championship season. Facing the factory Peugeot, Toyota, and Mazda teams, EuroRacing would be one of the few privateer teams in the championship.

The 1992 season was difficult for Euro Racing and their new Lola. The first race of the Lola was the first round of the Intersrie championship on Easter Monday 20th April where team boss Charles Zwolsman won the race with chassis HU01. At the opening round at a wet Monza, the Lolas suffered their first difficulties. Both cars suffered gearbox failures, with one car failing to even take the start (Nr 4, chassis HU02, Johansson-Pareja). The following round at Silverstone would see another gearbox failure for one of the cars (Nr 3, Euser-Zwolsman), while the second (Nr 4, Johansson-Pareja) managed to finish at third position but post-race inspection, however, found the finishing T92/10 to have used an illegal fuel compound, and the Euro Racing entry was disqualified. The following weekend, Euro Racing entered one Lola T92/10 in the second round of the Interserie championship, at the Nürburgring where Zwolsman managed only 18th. The 24 Hours of Le Mans would see a similar result than in the SWC, with one car (Nr 3, Zwolsman-Euser-Pareja) suffering transmission failure while the other would finish (Nr 4, Frentzen-Kasuya-Zwolsman). This time the finishing car's result remained, but it was a distant 80 laps behind the winner.

The second half of the season would see Euro Racing keeping with their usual trend of having one car finish, while the second car would not. Donington Park would see a fire in the cockpit take out one of the T92/10s (Nr 3, Euser-Pareja), the Nr 4 (Frentzen-Andrews) finishing 4th, while at Suzuka Circuit a Judd engine would fail (Nr 4, Euser-Tennyson-Frentzen). The Nr 3 (Pareja-Matsuda) car finished 5th. At the end of the season at Magny-Cours, Euro Racing's T92/10s would fail technical scrutineering and would not be allowed to participate. This would leave Euro Racing a distant fifth in the teams championship when the season came to a close. The World Sportscar Championship was dissolved at the end of 1992, and Euro Racing went bankrupt at the beginning of the following year. The team's T92/10s were sold off to private hands for storage in collections.

Chassis #HU-02 later competed extensively in Historic Sportscar Racing.

=== McNeil Engineering ===
In 1995, McNeil Engineering would purchase a third T92/10 chassis, with chassis number HU03, for use in the Interserie championship. Although the Group C formula was technically dead, the car was still legal for use against modified open-wheel race cars. Driven by Canadian Robbie Stirling and retaining the Judd V10 engine originally built in 1992, the T92/10 would take its first overall win in 1996 at Brands Hatch, followed with another at the end of the season at Circuito de Albacete, earning McNeil Engineering third in the championship. The car scored one more victory at the Hungaroring in 1997 before McNeil Engineering decided to switch to the new International Sports Racing Series for the 1998 season.

In order to comply with the new Sports Racer (SR) rules, similar to Le Mans Prototype (LMP) rules, the car had to be an open-cockpit sportscar. This required McNeil Engineering to remove the doors and roof from the car, although the windshield was mostly retained for aerodynamic purposes. A rollbar was added to the back in order to allow for driver safety. The large air scoop that had previously been on the roof was also removed and small vents were placed on the side of the cockpit to feed air to the engine. Because of the extensive modifications, McNeil Engineering renamed the car a Lola 981, although this was not an official designation from Lola.

The car suffered many technical problems, managing to finish a mere two races that season. Partially through the season, the old Judd GV10 unit was replaced with a more modern, and of a slightly larger displacement, GV4 V10. However this would not be sufficient to overcome the technical problems faced by McNeil Engineering, as the car finished the season having only scored six points in total. The 981 competed at the same time that Lola's new SR prototype was debuting following a six-year hiatus, the B98/10.

Following the disappointment of their open-cockpit effort, the 981 would be abandoned for 1999. However, the car was actually returned to its original closed cockpit form and reunited with its Judd GV10 engine, making the car known as the T92/10 once again and McNeil Engineering would re-enter the car in the Interserie championship for 2000. The car would manage another victory for its record in 2001 at the A1-Ring, before finally being retired from racing in 2002. This car was still retained by McNeil Engineering in the United Kingdom, until the company was dissolved on 30 March 2010.
