= 1994 24 Hours of Le Mans =

62nd 24 Hours of Le Mans endurance race

Previous: 1993	Next: 1995
Index: Races | Winners

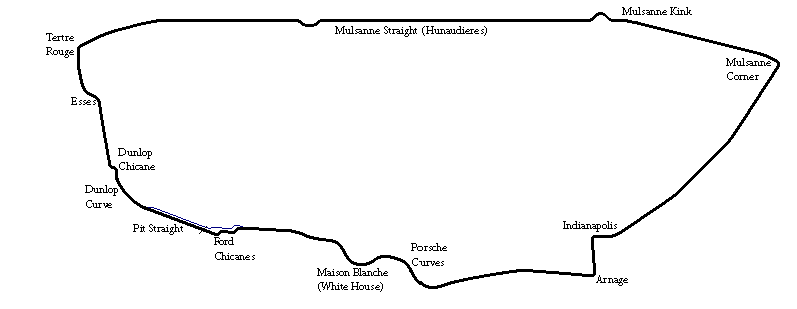
Le Mans in 1994

The 1994 24 Hours of Le Mans was the 62nd Grand Prix of Endurance, taking place at the Circuit de la Sarthe, and took place on 18 and 19 June 1994. The race was won by a car that had its roots in a 10-year-old design. Porsche exploited a loophole in the new GT regulations that allowed a single new car to represent a promised production run. Thus, in conjunction with customer team-owner Jochen Dauer, they created a road-legal version of the Porsche 962 Group C car. In the equivalency formula, GT cars were allowed more engine horsepower and a 50% bigger fuel tank than prototypes which, in turn, had better aerodynamics. The Dauer 962 Le Mans had both. Their main rivals would be Toyota, who put their support behind their two customer teams running a pair of Group C chassis after its 3.5-litre engined TS010 was no longer eligible.

The ACO had developed a new equivalency formula to be able to match Prototypes against GTs on a roughly equal level and the starting grid seemed to bear that out. It was Alain Ferté who put the homegrown Courage on pole position, with Derek Bell alongside him in an open-top Kremer spyder. It was Bell who swept around the outside to take the lead into the first corner before Ferté and Baldi in the Dauer passed him on the back straight. After the prototypes had pitted it left the Dauers of Baldi and Stuck running 1-2 at the end of the first hour. The challenge was taken up by the Toyotas who double-stinted their tyres to shorten their enforced extra fuel-stops. When Dalmas ran his Dauer out of fuel coming into the pit-lane and Sullivan had a puncture on his just after the pit-entry road, the Toyotas seized the opportunity and took their own 1-2 lead into the night. As temperatures fell, the performance of the Courages picked up, and they pulled back the gap to the top four. However, their charge ended early on Sunday with terminal engine problems. The Nisso Trust Toyota led through the night until pitting at dawn with a faulty differential. The hour spent on repairs dropped them to fifth, handing the lead over to the SARD Toyota. After their initial problems, the Dauer-Porsches had run well, never more than 1-2 laps behind, waiting for any slip-up. But all through the morning, the Toyota kept up its pace, pursued by the Dauers. It looked like Toyota might finally achieve their first Le Mans victory then with just 100 minutes to go, Jeff Krosnoff came to a stop at the pit exit. A broken gear-linkage leaving him with no gears. Jumping out, he manually slammed it into 3rd gear and did a lap to get back to the pits. The quarter-hour needed for repairs was all the Dauers needed to pass them. Nevertheless, Eddie Irvine took off to stage an all-out pursuit in the last hour. He caught up with second-placed Thierry Boutsen with ten minutes to go, and when they came up behind slower cars approaching the final chicane, Irvine pounced, trapping Boutsen behind the others. For the last couple of laps Boutsen tried to re-pass, scattering flag marshals expecting a tame procession to the flag. Irvine secured a courageous second, but the victory went to the Dauer-Porsche of Hurley Haywood, Yannick Dalmas and Mauro Baldi.

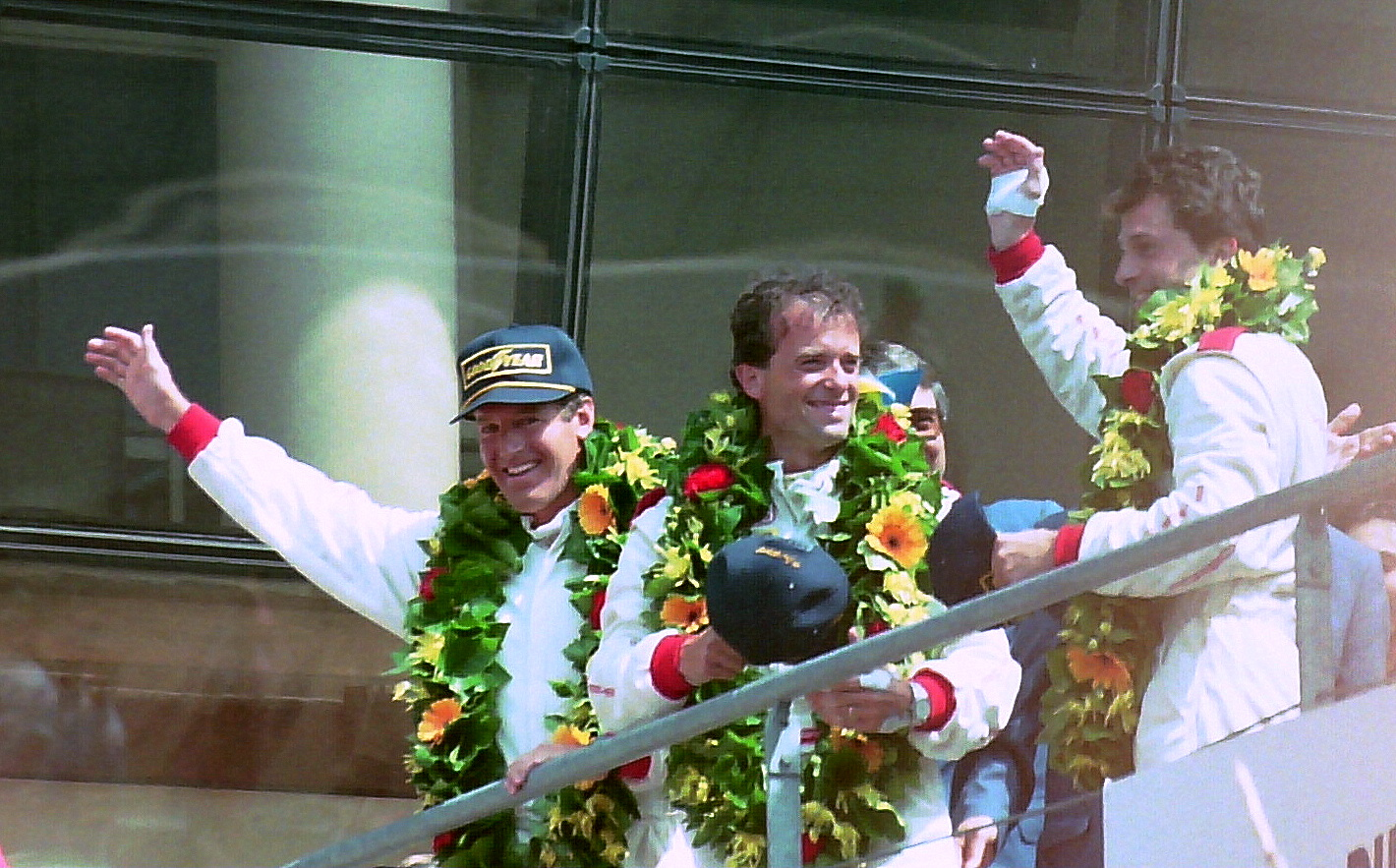
Winners Hurley Haywood, Mauro Baldi & Yannick Dalmas on the podium

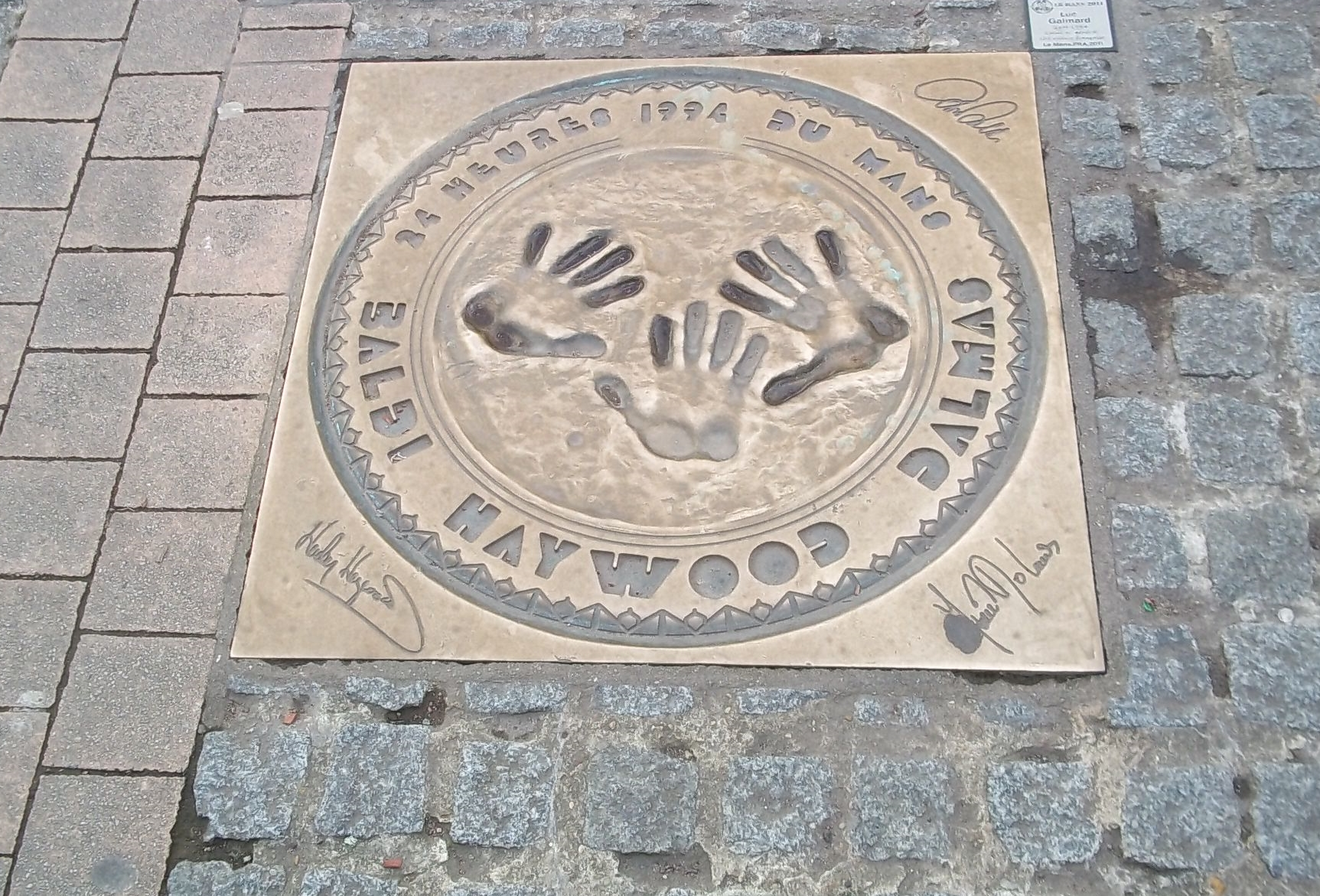
Victory plaque for the 1994 winners

In the GT class, outside of the Dauer-Porsches, there were ten other makes in the two classes. The GT1 victory was expected as a foregone conclusion for the Dauers, but in GT2 it was initially between the Callaway Corvette and the Larbre team Porsche. However, after the Corvette was disqualified for refuelling on-track, the Porsche reliability left Larbre to lead home a class 1-2-3.

== Regulations ==
After the demise of the Sportscar World Championship, FISA (Fédération Internationale du Sport Automobile) indicated that GT racing would be the future of endurance motorsport. The new BPR Global GT Series was one of the first fruits of this future. Named for the surnames of the originators, the international series was the merger of Jürgen Barth's German Porsche series and Patrick Peter and Stéphane Ratel's Venturi supercar series opened to all makes in 8 races in Europe and Asia. The Automobile Club de l'Ouest (ACO) had itself suffered and was virtually penniless, handing over the finance and promotion activity to the Syndicat Mixte. Yet, people recognised that teams would always want to race sports car prototypes. In the USA, IMSA were developing their "World Sports Car" category. The ACO chose to embrace mixed-class racing and came up with a pioneering equivalency formula to allow the production-based GT cars to compete for the outright win against its own LMP class and the IMSA WSC cars. These involved engine air-inlet restrictors, smaller fuel tanks and minimum weights to limit the prototypes' performance.

FISA's new GT rules had developed through 1993, in consultation with the ACO, IMSA and Japanese JAF, defining a GT as a 2-door, road-going car on sale to the public and registered for road-use in two of the following countries: France, Great Britain, Italy, Germany, the Benelux, USA or Japan. The chassis would remain unchanged, with only electronic- and driver-aids on the road-version allowed on the racing model. Minimum annual production levels were 25 for GT1, and 200 for GT2. However, a crucial loophole in the rules allowed a manufacturer to apply for GT1 homologation even when still planning the car design and before any cars had been made. This meant a single prototype for a proposed model could be classed as a GT model. But FISA were taking too long to finalise, so to allow time for prospective entrants to prepare, the ACO was forced to issue its own GT regulations in September 1993, before FISA had completed their work. When those rules did finally come out, there were several detailed differences. The ACO's GT1 encompassed the GT1 and GT2 classes run in the BPR series, while their GT2 covered the FISA/BPR GT3 and GT4.

The air-inlet restrictors would be graded according to the engine volume, induction system and the number of valves per cylinder – all important components defining a car's power output. A comparison of the restrictions:

- LM-P1/C90: fuel tank 80L, target output 550 bhp, min weight 900 kg (950 kg for turbos), max tyre width 16"
- LM P2: fuel tank 80L, target output 400 bhp, min weight 620 kg, with production engines, max tyre width 12"
- LM GT1: fuel tank 120L, target output 650 bhp, min weight 1000 kg, max tyre width 14"
- LM GT2: fuel tank 120L, target output 450 bhp, min weight 1050 kg, max tyre width 12"
- IMSA GTS: fuel tank 100L, target output 650 bhp, min weight 1000 kg, max tyre width 16"

Finally, the FIA had threatened the ACO with losing its international license if a track invasion by spectators happened again at the end of the race. Very dangerous if cars were still travelling at speed towards the finish line, this regulation would be rigorously enforced.

== Entries ==
With no more manufacturer support for the old Group C, the numbers were slipping away and only made up a third of the entries. However, the new GT regulations created a lot of interest, and the ACO received a pleasing 83 applications. They pruned this down to 50 for an ultimate 48 starters, along with a number of cars left on Reserve. There were three nominal factory teams (from Porsche, Lotus and Honda) although Toyota, Venturi and Alpine strongly supported their customer teams. Reaching out to IMSA, the ACO also offered places for any of their new WSC and GTS classes, but there was very little take-up this year. This year, there were 36 cars at the Test Day, held in early May.

Class	Quantity	Turbo / Supercharged engines
LM-P1/C90	10 / 9	8 / 7
IMSA-WSC	4 / 0	0 / 0
LM-P2	4 / 4	3 / 3
LM-GT1	17 / 11	12 / 8
LM-GT2	28 / 21	8 / 8
IMSA-GTS	3 / 3	2 / 2
Total Entries	66 / 48	33 / 28

- Note: The first number is the number accepted, the second the number who started.

=== LM-P1/C90 ===
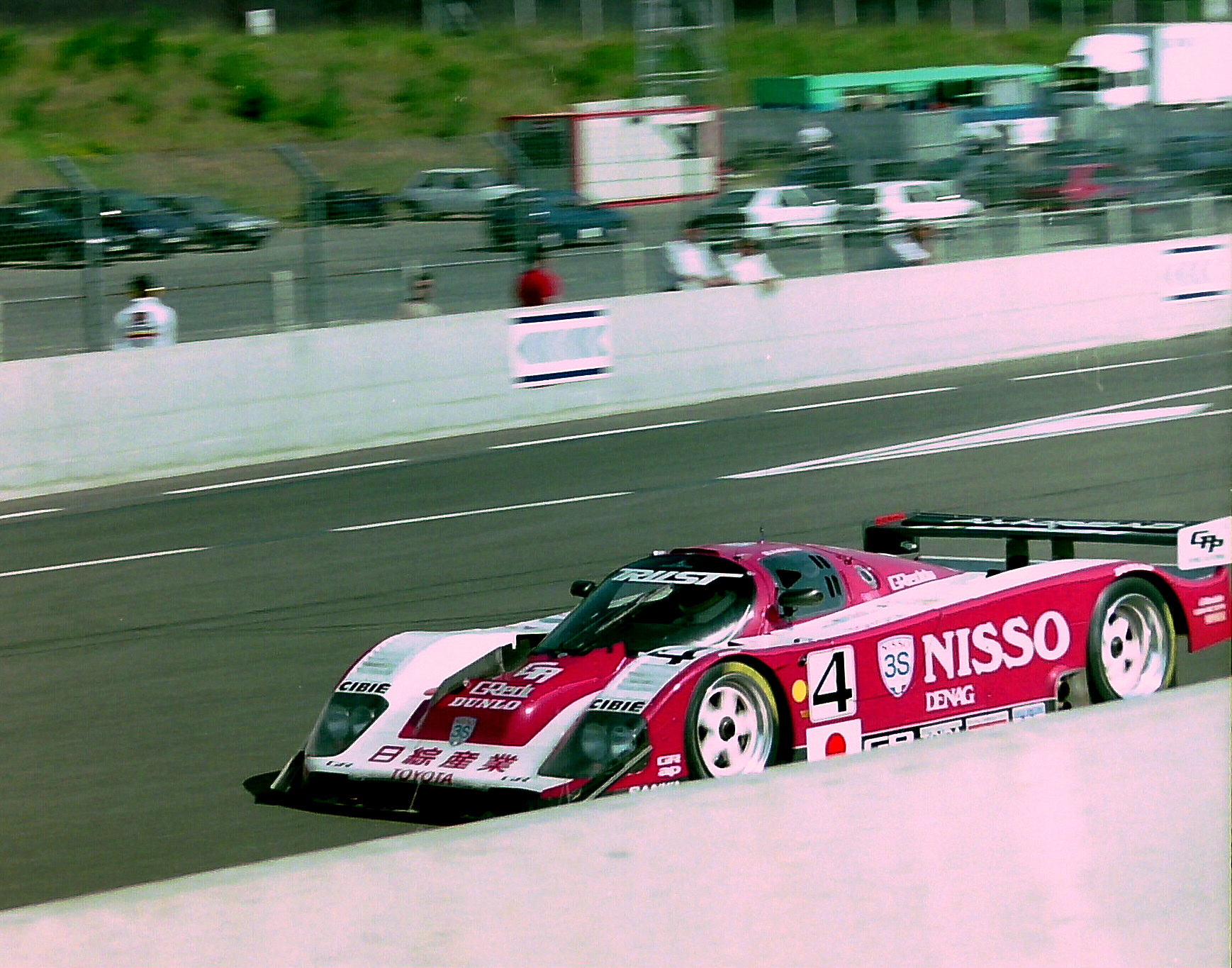
Toyota 94C-V

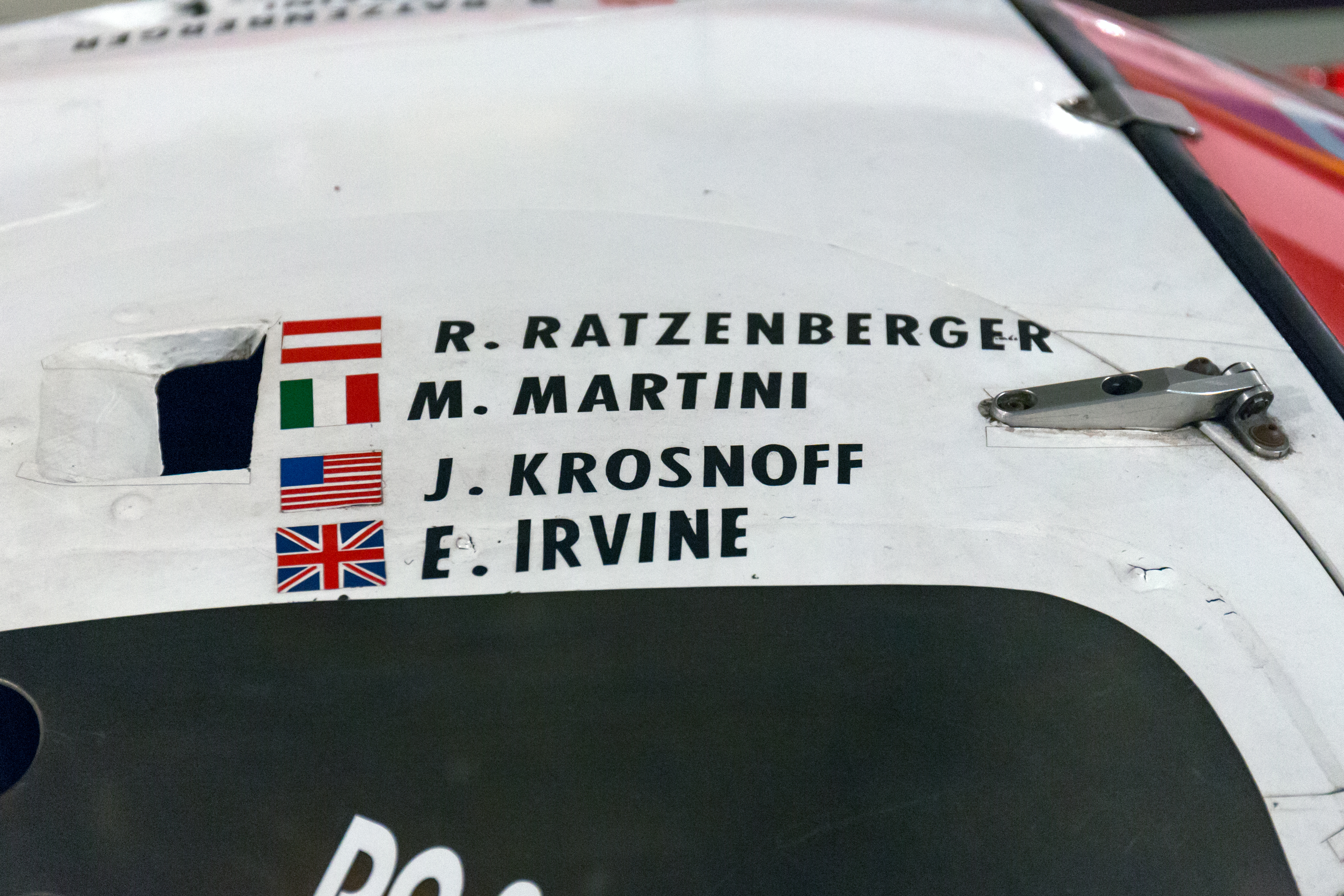
Roland Ratzenberger's name was left on the Toyota 94C-V as a tribute.

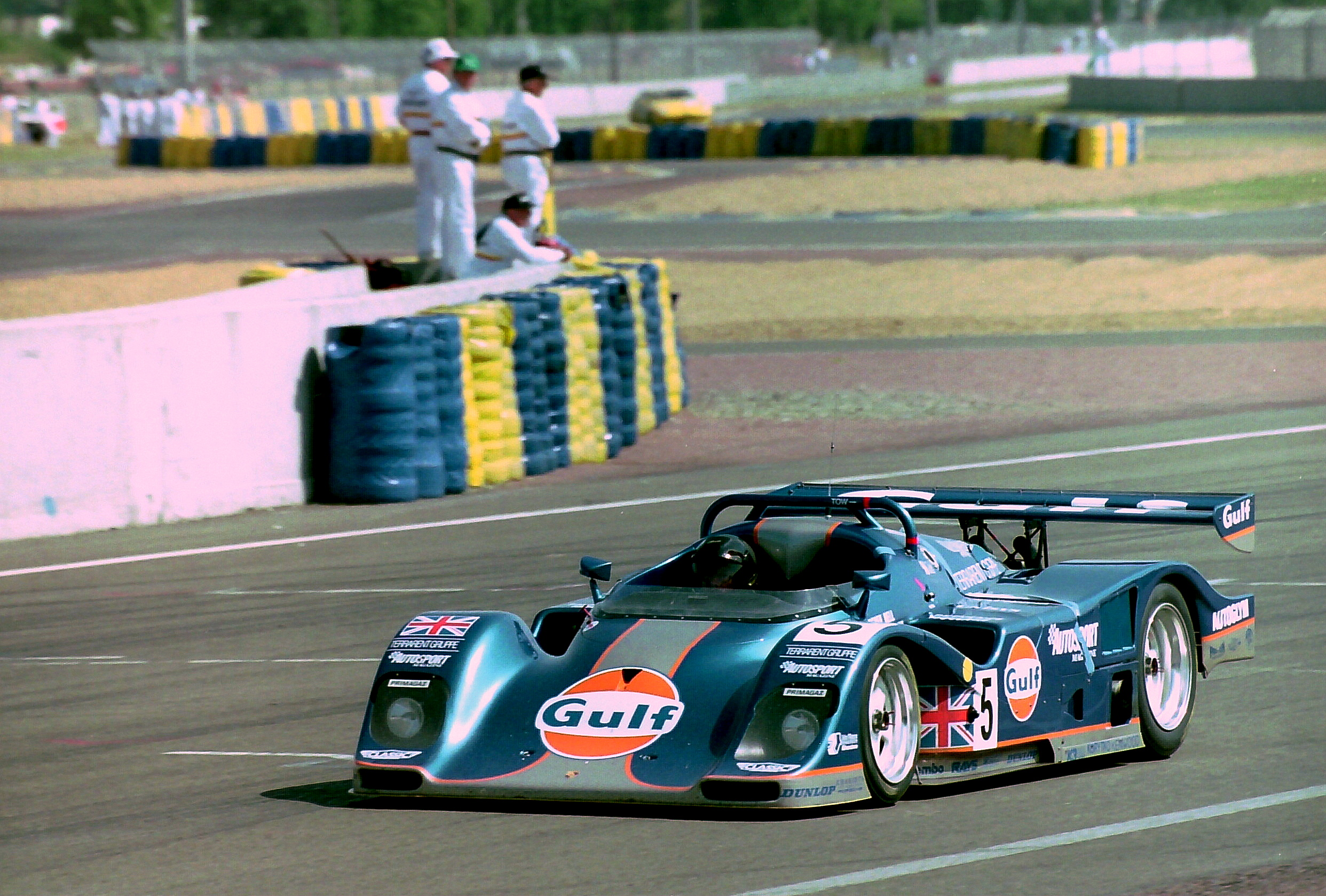
Kremer K8 spyder

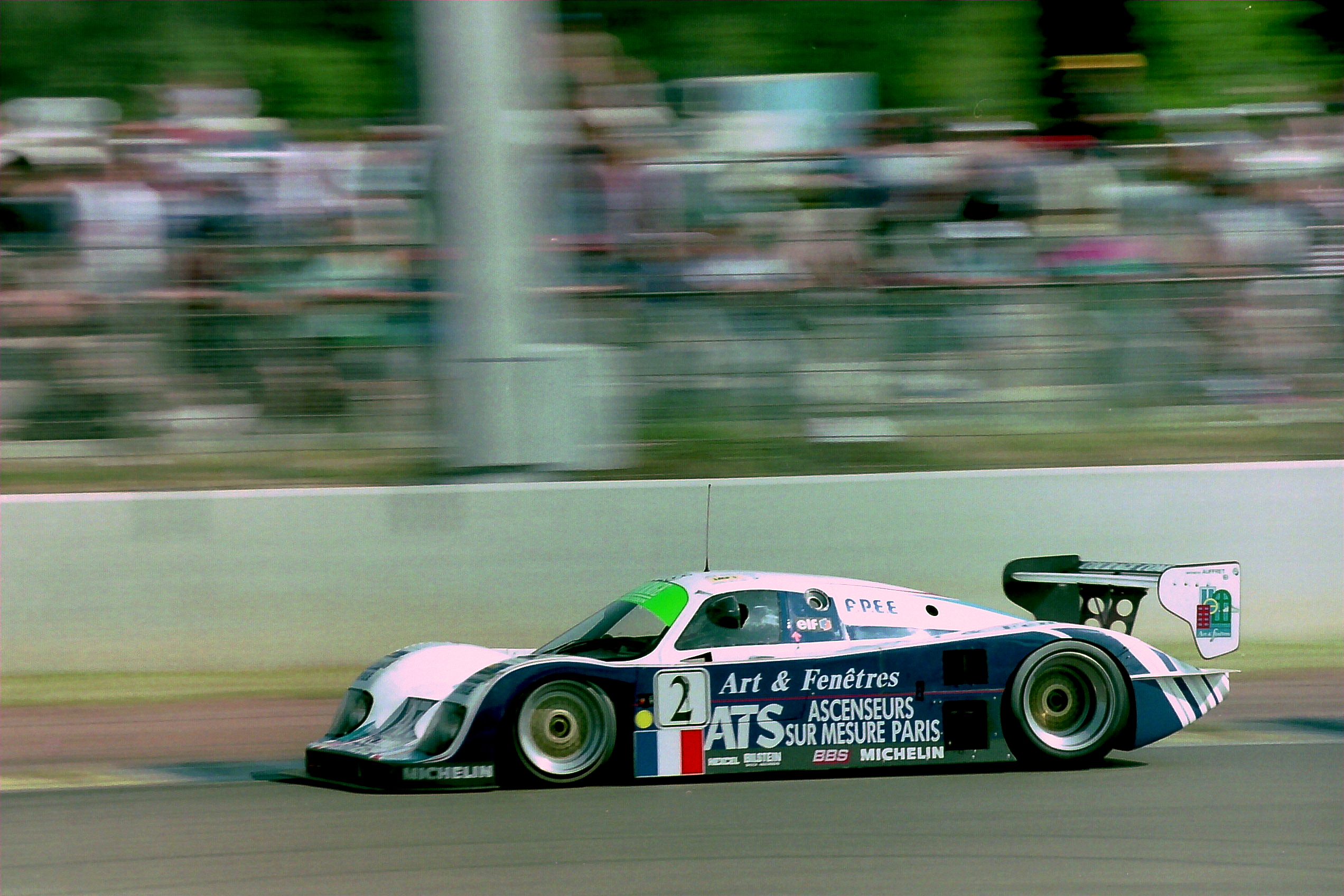
Courage C32LM

Prototype racing was in a state of flux - the fleet of former Group C cars were aging and increasingly obsolete or kept in museums by the works teams. The new IMSA-WSC class was still in its infancy, so the ACO therefore adapted their prototype rules to aim for the 1990 Group C cars, with the proviso that they now had to be open-topped and with flat underfloors to limit the impact of ground-effects technology.

With the closure of their works team, Toyota put their support behind their regular customer teams, who had convincingly beaten the Porsches in previous year. This year's 94C-V were essentially 2-year-old cars based on a 6-year design. After the debacles of the previous years, the team at Toyota’s engineering department installed stronger gearboxes, as well as a new aero-kit to comply with the ACO regulations with a long tail and low rear-wing. Although down about 15 kph on top speed compared to the Porsche-engine cars (with their larger air restrictors), the greater engine torque gave the Toyotas better acceleration. The #1 car was run by Shin Kato's SARD team, with Mauro Martini, Jeff Krosnoff and Eddie Irvine brought in as a replacement for Roland Ratzenberger. In a poignant tribute, the team had the name of Ratzenberger listed on the car, as he was originally scheduled to drive in the SARD Toyota but had been tragically killed in qualifying for the San Marino Grand Prix just before the test-day. The #4 Nisso Trust Racing Team had enticed veteran Bob Wollek to join team regulars George Fouché and Steven Andskär.

Longtime Porsche customers, the Kremer brothers had modified their Porsche 962 to an open-top spyder version, called the Kremer K7. It had notable success, winning the Interserie series in 1992 and 1993 by Manuel Reuter and Giovanni Lavaggi respectively. They took the car to the May test day in the LM-P1 class, but it was ruled ineligible by the scrutineers. Work quickly started on a new version, which became the K8. This involved a complete change of chassis to a flat bottom, and returning it to be a 2-seater, with a kevlar/carbonfibre bodyshell. Matters became complicated when Kremer Racing then secured the rights to run the Honda works GT effort on their behalf. However, the Project 100 marketing agency approached Kremer regarding a deal to run a P1 for a return to Le Mans by Gulf Oil UK. The idea was to have it centred around Derek Bell, who had won his first Le Mans victory (of 5) with the Gulf-Mirage GR8 prototype. An agreement was reached, and race preparation of the K8 was taken over by UK-based Kiwi Graham Lorimer's F3000 team. Bell was enticed out of his year of retirement for the event. Decked out in its distinctive Gulf livery, he ran midfield at the test-day – so work was required to reduce the downforce effects. For the race, Bell was teamed up with Robin Donovan and Jürgen Lässig.

Yves Courage was still trying to emulate Jean Rondeau with an owner/racer Le Mans win. His team was working on a new chassis, the Courage C41, for the IMSA series. However, with a month to go the project was set aside as there would not be enough time to get it properly race-ready. Already planning a 3-car assault including two C32LMs based on last year's chassis, a third one was hastily prepared in its stead. Engineer Marcel Hubert updated the cars for a flat-bottom and longer tail. The suspension was also modified to use Michelin tyres for the first time. The lead car would be raced by veteran Henri Pescarolo with Alain Ferté and Franck Lagorce. Louis Descartes was another French garagiste who had made his own cars during the Group C era. The ALD 06 was a 5-year-old design and had raced in the 1989 race. Picked up by a group of French privateers, they took an entry left vacant by Stealth Engineering’s non-appearance. With an aluminium monocoque and an underpowered but reliable 450 bhp BMW M88 3.5-litre engine it was spot on the 900 kg minimum weight.

ADA Engineering had raced a series of low-budget Group C cars in the previous decade. In 1992 they entered their Porsche 962C-GTi with Derek Bell and his son. They refashioned the car for the LM-P1/C90 regulations and entered it on behalf of the Japanese popstar and F3 driver Masahiko Kondō, who had Jun Harada and female driver Tomiko Yoshikawa. Roland Bassaler also took the chance to run his evergreen 1982-vintage Sehcar, now rebadged as an ALPA (Automobiles Lucien Philippe Associés) after the Le Mans company was commissioned to do a 4-week upgrade of the venerable car – squeezing it in between work on the Bugatti and Dodge Vipers. The big change was replacing the BMW 3.5-litre engine with a Cosworth DFZ V8. Tuned by Swiss engine-specialist Heini Mader, it gave Bassaler an extra 100 bhp. Work was also done on the suspension, braking and cooling systems. In return, ALPA wanted two of their up-and-coming drivers in the car: Nicolas Minassian and Olivier Couvreur. The car was first reserve. As a 12-year design, it is the oldest chassis to run at Le Mans

=== LM-P2 ===
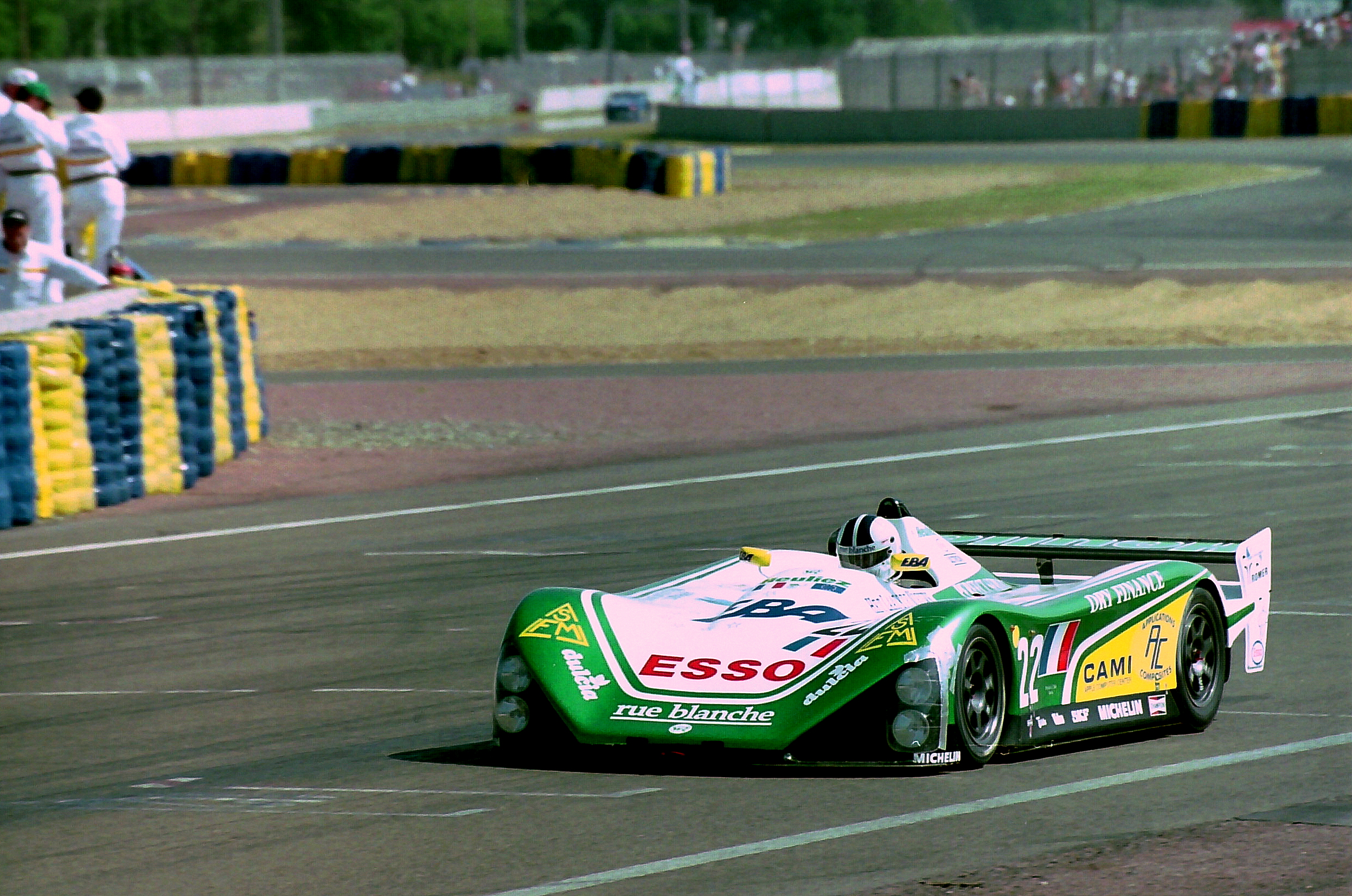
WR LM94

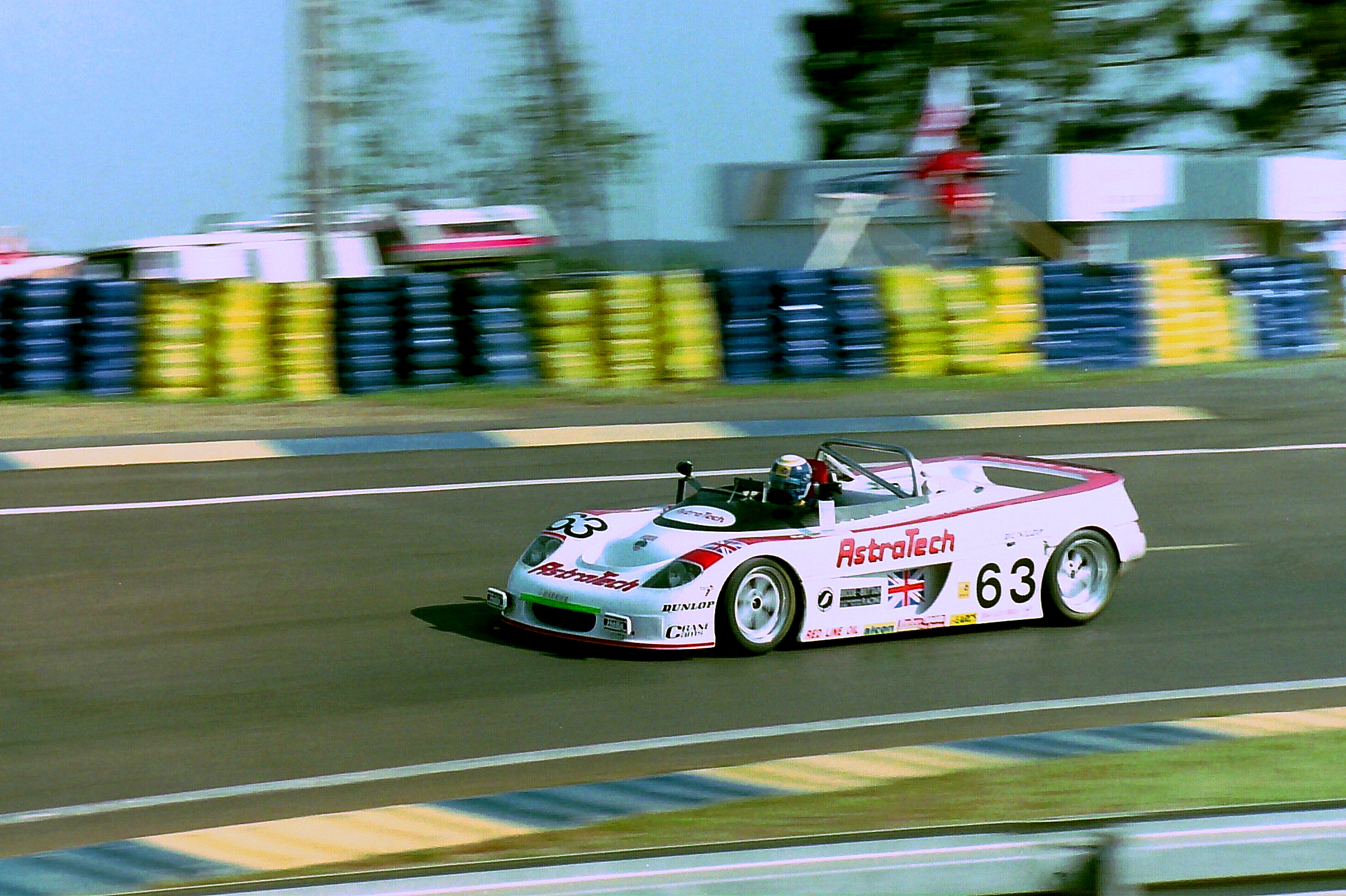
Harrier LR9 Spyder

The LM-P2 class was limited to single-seat prototypes with production-based engines. After Welter Racing took the class victory in 1993, they planned a two-car effort for this year's race. The new model, the LM94, was re-profiled and got updated suspension. To save costs, the two cars were fitted with 1.9-litre Peugeot engines which put out 400 bhp with the restrictors. But with a weight of only 650 kg, they were the lightest cars in the field and could get up to 305 kph (190 mph). Patrick Gonin and Pierre Petit had raced a WR together in the 1992 race, and reunited to race the older LM93 (along with debutante Marc Rostan), while Hervé Regout/Jean-François Yvon/Jean-Paul Libert took the lead car.

Didier Bonnet also returned with a new lightweight prototype. The team had upgraded one of the Debora SP93s to a new version – the LMP294 – with a flat bottom, a smaller rear wing and revising the rear suspension layout. The 3-litre V6 Alfa Romeo 164 engine was tuned further to now reach 260 bhp. The other entry in the class was an accommodation to an unusual car. The Harrier LR9 was a concept roadcar built be Lester Ray. It also featured the 3-litre V6 Alfa Romeo engine, which was mounted amidships. Originally a coupé, it had been reworked to race as the open-top spyder and refitted with a 350 bhp Cosworth BDG engine. Originally entered by Chamberlain Engineering in the GT2 class, the scrutineers rejected it as it had no roof, per GT requirements. However, Hugh Chamberlain was able to convince them to instead put it in the LM-P2 prototype class.

=== LM GT1 ===
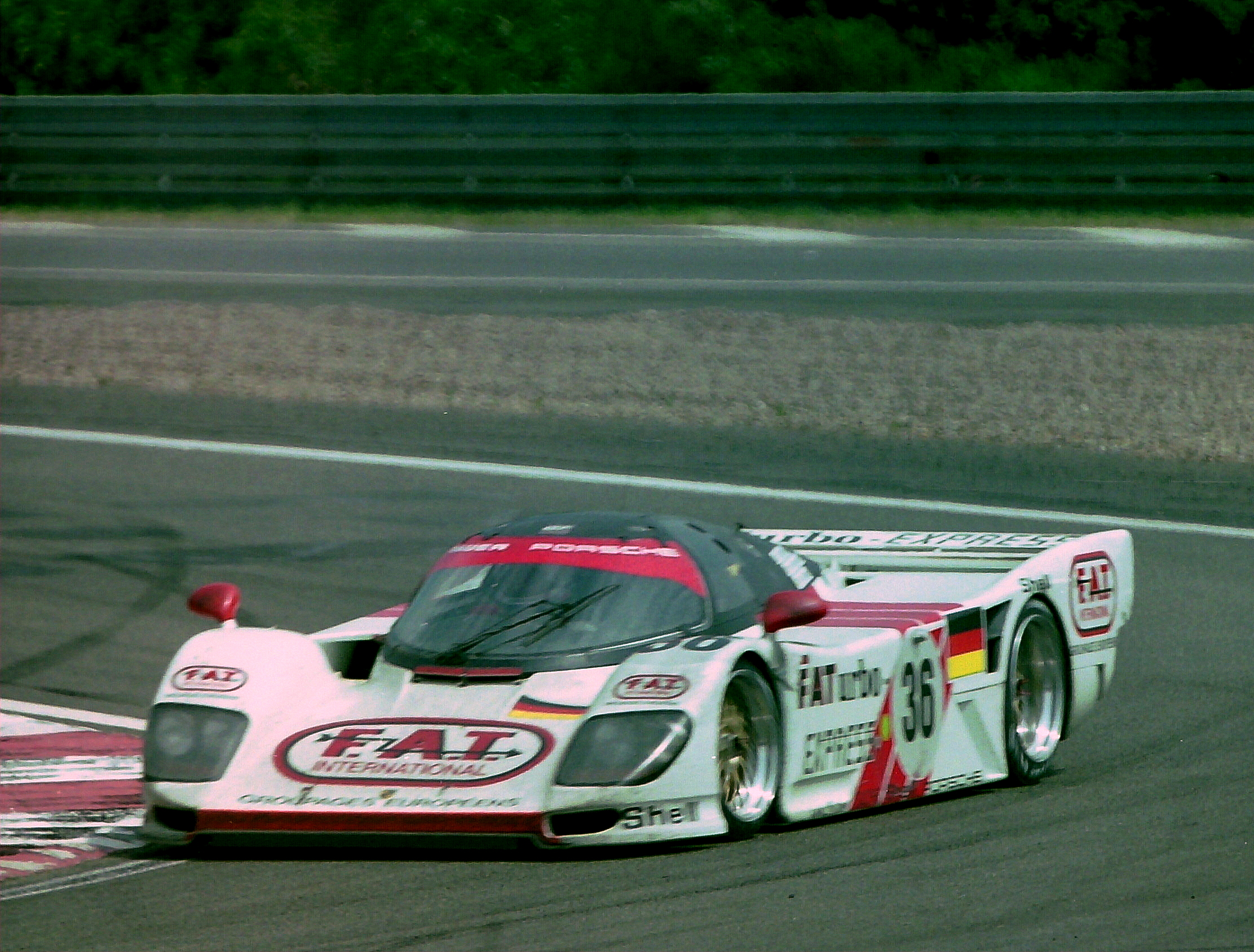
Dauer-Porsche 962

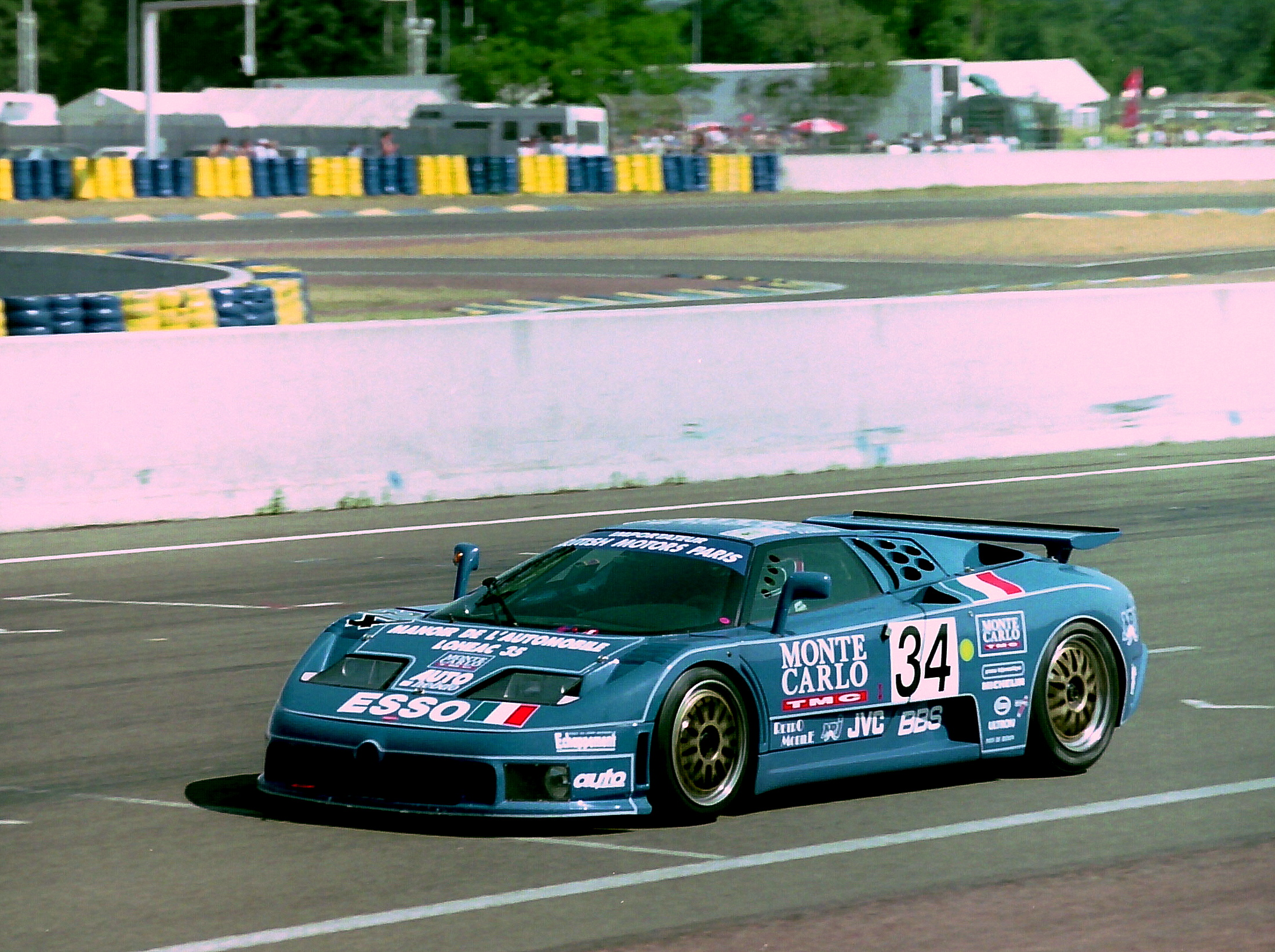
Bugatti EB110 SS

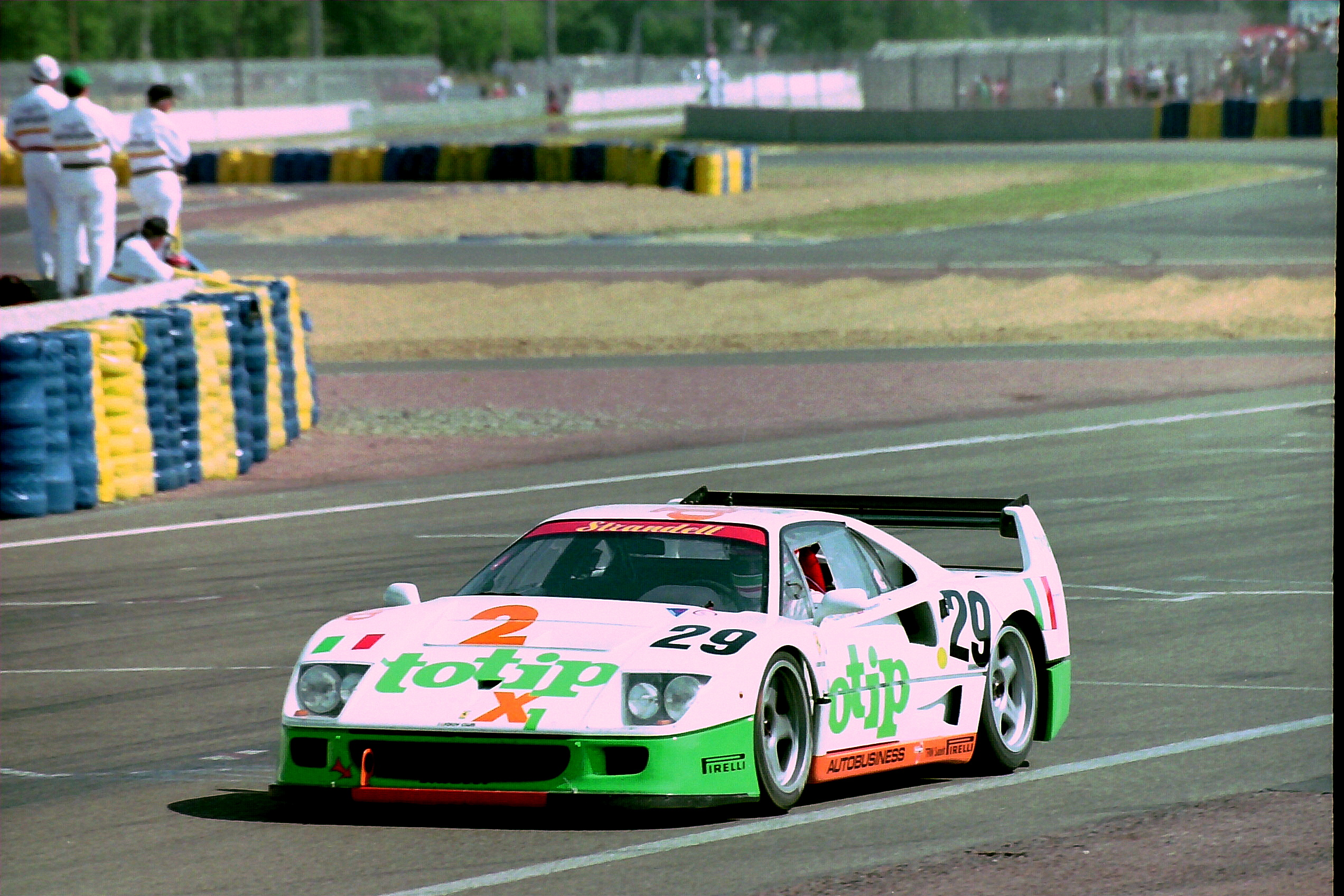
Ferrari F40 LM

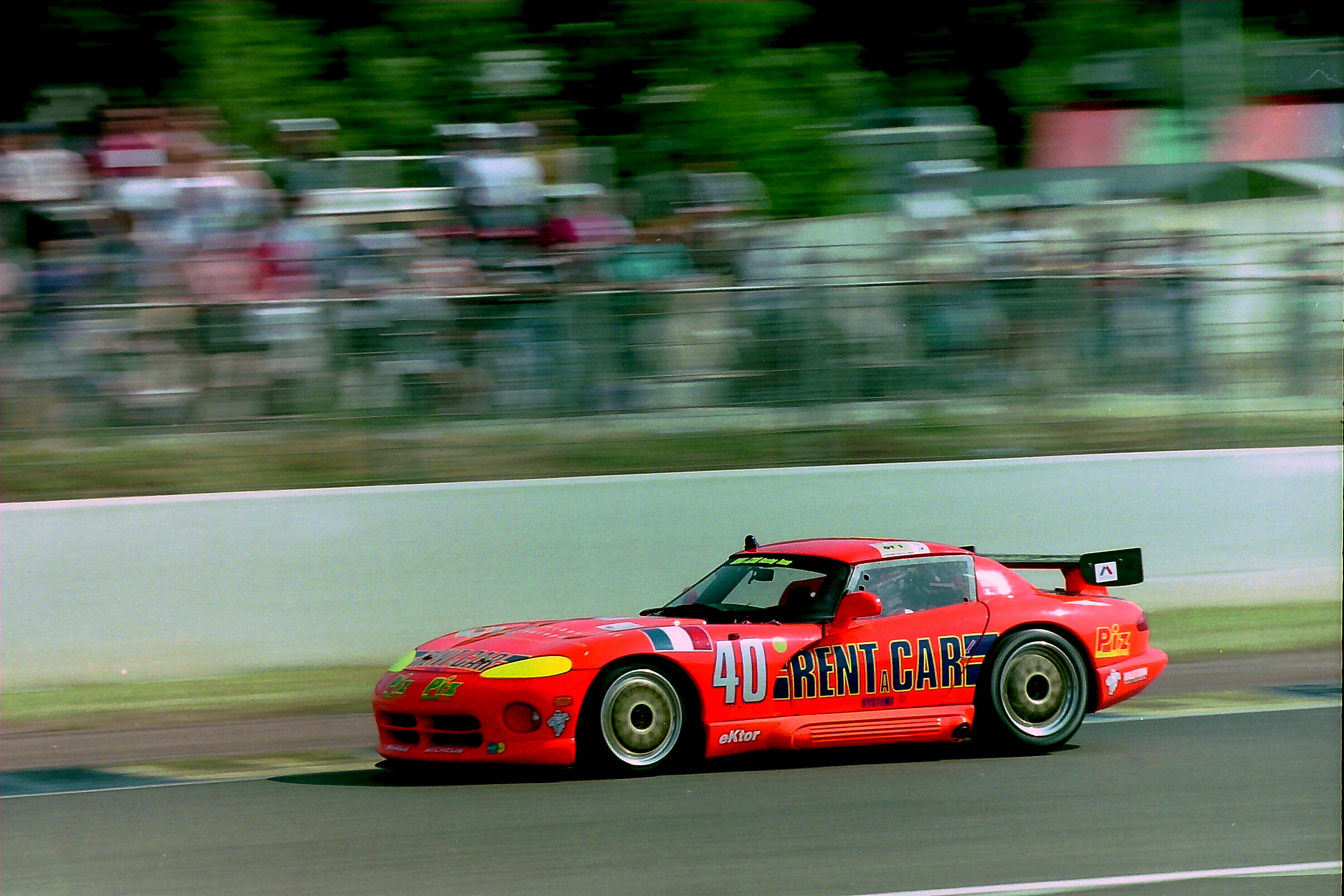
Dodge Viper RT10

The equivalency formula in the regulations used different sized air restrictors to equalise the power outputs between a wide range of engine sizes and formats. An example being the 52.5mm diameter unit on the 8-litre V10 engine of the Dodge Viper versus the 25.9mm restrictor on the quad-turbo Bugatti EB110, so that both engines produced between 600-650 bhp.

The loophole in the regulations allowing as little as a single example of a new road-going model to get entry to the GT1 class was soon picked up by manufacturers. Porsche studied the rules and built a road-legal version of the Porsche 962C. It was born out of a response to the new McLaren F1 supercar, when Porsche realised they could not develop a mid-engine version of the 911 in time for 1994-5. The alternative was to work with their other successful racing model. Jochen Dauer was a former racer and a Porsche customer team-owner in the Interserie, who had previously approached Weissach about creating his own road-going conversion-kit of the 962. Chief Engineer Norbert Singer saw this now as the ideal opportunity to become competitive in the new regulations and got the Dauer 962 registered in the GT1 classification. The biggest benefit was the 100 bhp greater of a GT1 over the LM-P1s. The 50% bigger fuel tank was an added bonus, although it could only run on 12" tyres and was 100 kg heavier than the original sportscar. With the restrictors, the 3-litre engine could generate 620 bhp but still had a top speed of 330 kph (205 mph). Three chassis were constructed and two came to Le Mans, and with Porsche's influence a strong driver lineup was assembled. Nominally entered by Dauer, the cars were prepared by Joest Racing. Former winners Hurley Haywood and Yannick Dalmas were joined by ex-Sauber and Peugeot works driver Mauro Baldi, and the other car had Hans-Joachim Stuck, Thierry Boutsen and American Danny Sullivan. They discretely asked their customer teams not to enter their own GT1 Porsches, to enhance chances for a works class-win. Jack Leconte's Larbre Compétition had won the opening two rounds of the BPR series and second at Daytona in their GT1 Porsche turbo and complied. So, the only customer Porsche was the turquoise 911 turbo of Konrad Motorsport with Patrick Neve Racing.

The Venturi cars had shown good reliability in the previous year’s race. In the close-season, the new 600LM was released. Its rounder front nose had bigger air intakes for larger carbon-brakes. Likewise, the rear-end was revised for bigger tyres and a new wing. The engine got better components and enhanced turbos linked to a strengthened gearbox, and with a more refined engine-management system, it had a 20% power increase, up to 620 bhp. The performance upgrade was noticeable, and Venturis won the two BPR rounds leading up to Le Mans. The customer teams had quickly changed up to the new model and four cars were on the entry list with two more on reserve. Jacadi Racing had two cars: Team-drivers Michel Ferté and Michel Neugarten had won the round at Dijon-Prenois and had ex-F1 driver Olivier Grouillard as the third driver. The other Jacadi car had Jacques Tropenat and Ferdinand de Lesseps from the BBA Compétition team. BBA team-owner Jean-Luc Maury-Laribière had his car entered, as well as a reserve entry for fellow Venturi owner Éric Graham. In his own car, he invited Hervé Poulain as a co-driver. In the 1970s, Poulain had been a champion of the BMW Art Cars and once again took the opportunity to decorate his drive. French artist Arman did a multitone brown design that resembled snakeskin or reptile scales. “Rocky” Agusta (of the MV Agusta motorcycle family) had the other direct entry, while Jean-Claude Basso’s 600LM was in the reserves – despite having won the last BPR race before Le Mans at the historic Linas-Montlhéry circuit (where Basso had the expert services of Henri Pescarolo as his co-driver).

Bugatti's last appearance at Le Mans was a successful one: winning the 1939 race. The original company closed in 1947 after the death of founder Ettore Bugatti, but in 1989 Italian entrepreneur Romano Artioli bought the rights to the name and opened a new factory near Modena. The Bugatti EB110 SS was the epitome of the term "supercar" – designed by Marcello Gandini, who had penned the Lancia Stratos and Lamborghini Countach. This entry was a private development of French publisher Michel Hommel, without factory involvement. Based on the Sport Stradale model that came out in 1989, the 3.5-litre V12 engine had four small IHI turbos and 5 valves per cylinder. Aside from competition-grade pistons, it needed little work – developing 640 bhp to give a top speed of 355 kph (220 mph). Most work was around trimming weight with an advanced composites-chassis made by French company Aérospatiale. The four-wheel drive suspension and anti-lock carbon-brake system only needed adjustment to accommodate bigger 18" wheels. An all-French driver line-up was assembled, with 1993-winner Éric Hélary joined by Alain Cudini and Jean-Christophe Boullion. Although only finished in the paddock at the test day, Hélary was the second-fastest GT car, behind the Dauer.

Ferrari had built its reputation with Le Mans victories and made a welcome return on the start-line. Its weapon of choice in LM GT1 would be the Ferrari F40, the last model built at Modena before Enzo Ferrari's death in 1988. The competition version, the F40 LM appeared the same year. The engine was a 3-litre quad-cam V8, mid-mounted and fitted with twin IHI turbos. Upgraded with double-wishbone suspension, new aerodynamics front and back and with a new Weber-Marelli engine-management system the power output was lifted to 720 bhp. This model was revised to the Le Mans GT specifications for Luciano della Noce to run in the 1993 Italian GT Championship. This year he teamed up with Swede Bo Strandell for the BPR Series, with Anders Olofsson as his co-driver and brought the car to Le Mans. The car was fast, but reliability was an issue. For Le Mans, they used an entry extended to the Obermaier Racing team.

The last time a Dodge had raced at Le Mans, it was a Dodge Charger in 1976, as an invitational NASCAR that had engine failure on the first lap. The marque returned this year, with a pair of Dodge Vipers entered by French privateer Gilles Gaignault and his new Rent-a-Car Racing team. The tubular steel frame was wrapped with an aluminium shell. To drop weight, the huge 8-litre V10 engine was recast into aluminium by Lamborghini (like Dodge, a subsidiary of Chrysler) with a 6-speed BorgWarner gearbox and pushed out 400 bhp. Gaignault worked with Luigi Cimarosti's team in Belgium to fine-tune the engine up to 550 bhp. He also commissioned Méca Auto Système, part of ALPA and run by ex-Rondeau engineers, to race-prepare the two cars. They had carbonfibre panels fitted, along with upgraded suspension and brakes. Even so, they still came in at a hefty 1340 kg. A strong line-up was assembled, with ex F1 Grand Prix winner René Arnoux and 21-race Le Mans veteran François Migault the lead drivers. Only one of the cars was ready for the test-day but was almost 30 seconds slower than the best Ferrari. Bedecked in bright, fluoro orange and yellow respectively, and the big rumbling V8, they were crowd favourites.

=== LM GT2 ===
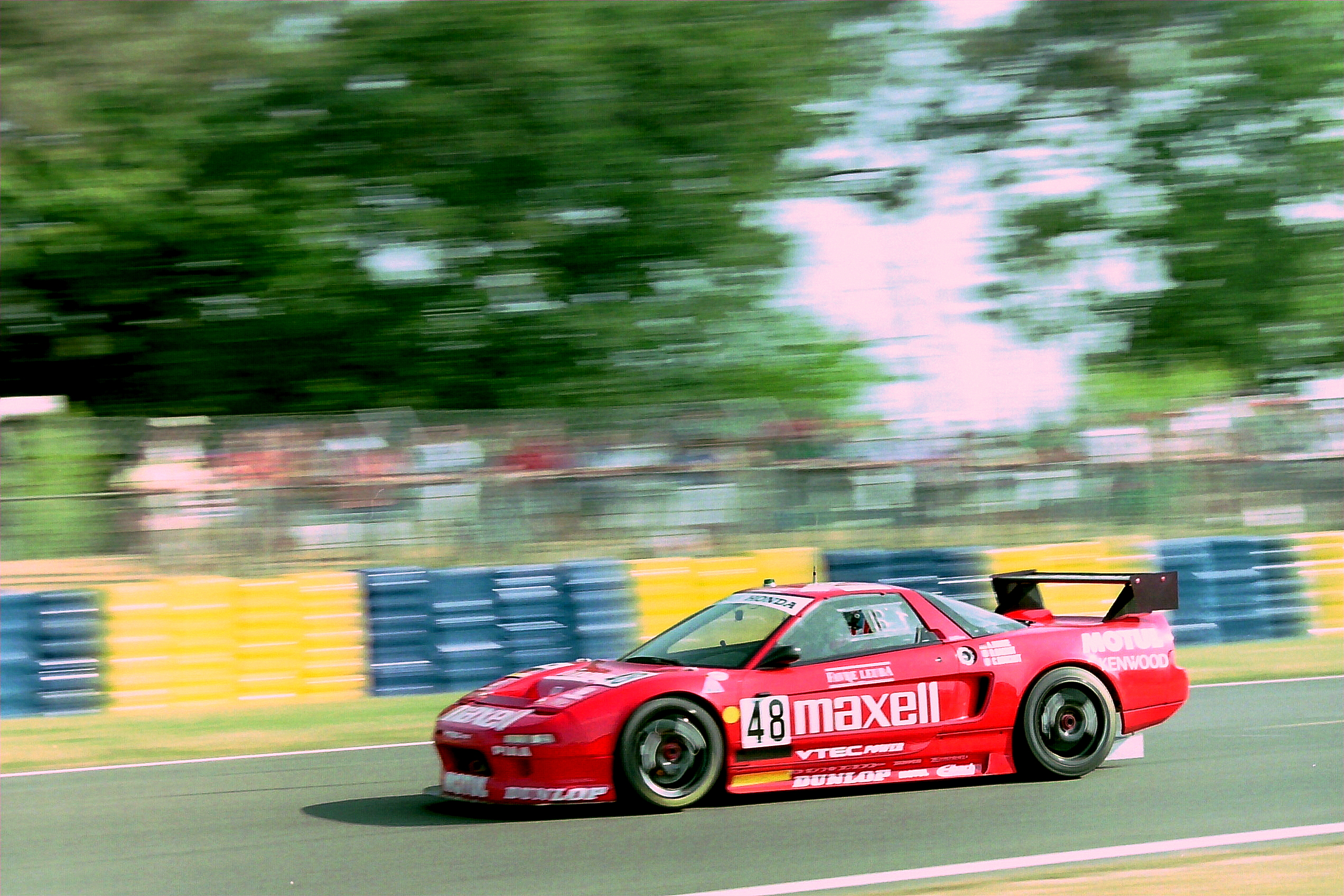
Honda NSX

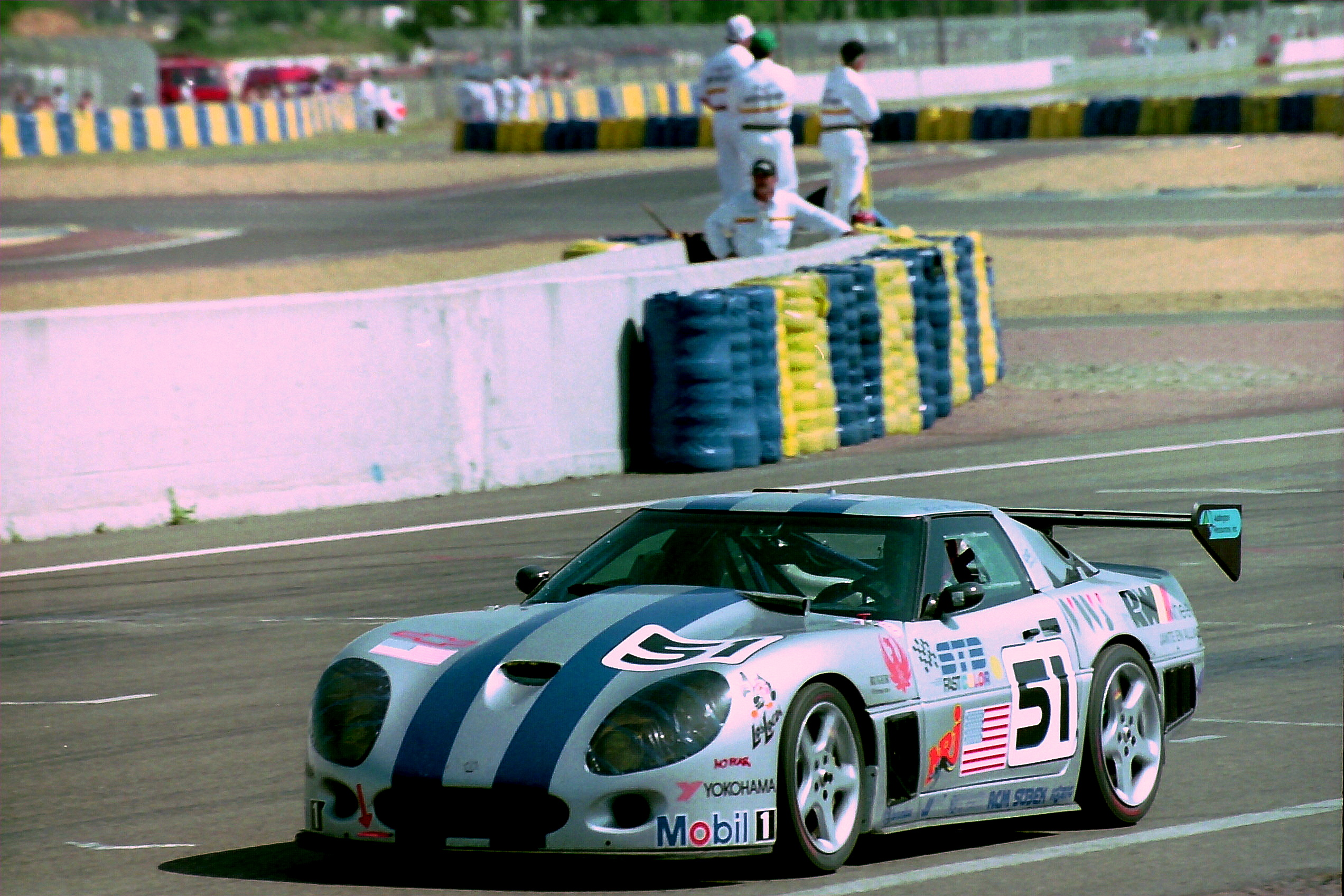
Callaway Corvette

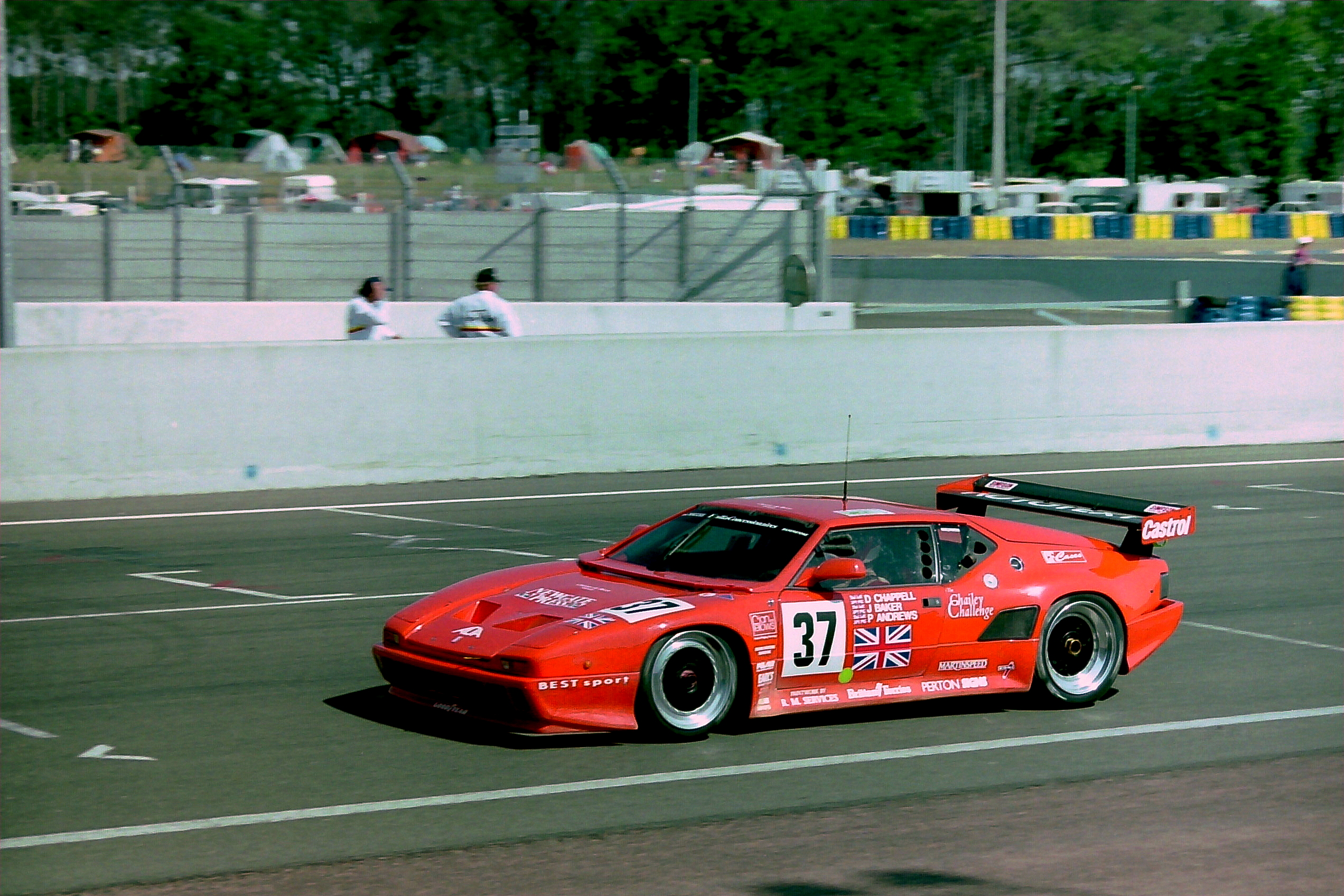
De Tomaso Pantera of ADA Engineering

No fewer than 9 different manufacturers signed up to the GT2 class, of which five could be expected to challenge for the class-win. There were seven Porsche Carrera RSRs, fitted with the 3.8-litre flat-6 engine. These were GT3 Cup cars running in the BPR Series. After winning the GT class the previous year, Larbre Compétition brought three cars this year. Experienced endurance driver Jesús Pareja, with Dominique Dupuy (winners in Jarama) led the main car, while team-owner Leconte ran in the second. The third was prepared on behalf of long-time Le Mans racers, the Alméras brothers, who had Jacques Laffite as their co-driver. The British team, Bristow Motorsport, had taken three of the four GT3 class-wins in the BPR series. Their drivers, Ray Bellm, Harry Nuttall and Charles Rickett brought their RSR, entered by Norwegian Erik Henriksen. An unusual Porsche entry was the Porsche 968 from Seikel Motorsport, who were running it in the BPR series. The front-engine car was the successor to the 944. This Turbo RS version was the original works prototype that had been bought by Thomas Bscher, who was running it with Peter Seikel's team. The 3-litre engine was fitted with a single KKK (Kühnle, Kopp & Kausch) turbo and put out 350 bhp. Bscher raced the car with Lindsay Owen-Jones and 1990 race-winner John Nielsen.

There were two direct works teams in GT2. The first was the debut by a fourth Japanese marque – Honda. They had finished a very successful time in Formula 1 and were evaluating future options with either IndyCar or sportscar racing. The model chosen was the Honda NSX and it had shown promise in the 1993 German GT championship with Seikel Motorsport. This year, Honda Motor Europe got British firm TC Prototypes to prepare full racing versions and offered the Kremer brothers to run the team. The TCP project manager was Geoff Kingston, who had worked on the Jaguar and Toyota Group C cars. Getting an overhaul of suspension, steering and aerodynamics, along with using carbon-fibre panels dropped the weight and improved downforce by 25%. The 3.0-litre RX306 engine was a 24-valve V6 and had the new VTEC engine-management system. Worked on by Honda Japan, it could develop 380 bhp with the ACO restrictors but could only get to 280 kph (175 mph). Kremer brought four cars to Le Mans, including a spare, and they were supported by 20 Honda personnel. Armin Hahne had raced the car in Germany and at the test-day. His co-drivers were 1993 race-winner Christophe Bouchut and F1 driver Bertrand Gachot. The second car had Philippe Favre with multiple JTCC champion, for Honda, Hideki Okada and Kazuo Shimizu. The third car was run by the new Team Kunimitsu, founded by Group C champion Kunimitsu Takahashi, who had raced with Kremer five times in the late-80s. The lead car also featured the innovation of an in-car TV camera to broadcast the driver's perspective live to the viewing audience.

The other works team was from Lotus Cars. After a disappointing race the previous year, they had done extensive work with Hugh Chamberlain's team to improve the Esprit S300, with extensive work on the engine and brakes. Thorkild Thyrring ran a car in the British GT series, taking three victories and with Andreas Fuchs was running the BPR series. Regular Chamberlain drivers, Richard Piper, Olindo Iacobelli and Peter Hardman returned to run the second car. A third privateer Lotus was entered by Italian Fabio Magnani.

There were three privateer Ferrari entries in GT2, running the Ferrari 348. The company had produced a lightened version for a one-make series – the GT Competizione. Two were entered by the Ferrari Club Italia, a group of almost 500 owners'-clubs and prepared in a workshop next to Ferrari's Fiorano test-track. Former lead driver for Brun Motorsport, Oscar Larrauri headed the FCI car, while the second was given to Prince Alfonso de Orléans-Borbón (a cousin to the King of Spain) on behalf of the Spanish owners'-clubs. Robin Smith's Simpson Engineering team returned after missing the start last year when Eddie Irvine punted them off in the warm-up. Their 348 LM had been bored out slightly to 3446cc to produce 450 bhp and the engine moved forward to make room for a Hewland gearbox. With a revised rear suspension and kevlar-carbonfibre panels, it was the lightest of the three at 1130 kg. They also took the precaution of adding a sticker to the rear fender: "IRVINE KEEP CLEAR".

In the 1970s, Automobiles Alpine, as a partner with Renault Sport, had duelled with Porsche for outright victory at Le Mans, finally achieving success in 1978. In the 1980s, Renault had run a 1-make race series with the Alpine GTA. The A610 was the successor to that car. This entry was a privateer effort of Patrick Legeay, whose company, Legeay Sports Mécanique, specialised in upgrading Renaults for road and racing, based in the suburbs of Le Mans city. The car was prepared to the GT2 regs with the support of the Alpine factory. They installed a modified version of the 3-litre PRV engine, as used in the Venturi. Fitted with only 2 valves-per-cylinder it generated 430 bhp with the twin Garrett turbos. Agusta Racing also had two of the older Venturi 400 LMs entered for GT2, aside from their GT1 entry. Stéphane Ratel, one of the co-founders of the BPR series had finished running his own team and took up one of those seats while the other car had regular Agusta drivers, Spaniards Javier Camp and Santiago Puig.

Reeves Callaway had previously been involved in Group C racing, building the V8 engines for the Aston Martin AMR1 in 1989. His latest project was a bespoke version of the Chevrolet Corvette ZR-1, called the "SuperNatural". The Chev LT-1 engine was rebuilt by Callaway for lightness and endurance. Bored out to 6.2-litres, it was a V8 twin-valve dry-sump engine. They also installed a 6-speed ZF gearbox, new suspension, brakes and new aerodynamic bodywork. The car had performed well in the German championship in 1993, so an entry was lodged for Le Mans. The bodyshell was replaced with carbon-kevlar panels were and, with the required engine restrictor, the engine output was brought back to 450 bhp. Despite that, it could still reach 300 kph (185 mph) on the long straights. American Boris Said had raced it in Germany and was lead-driver, with Frank Jelinski and gentleman driver Michel Maisonneuve as co-drivers.

As well as their LM-P1 entry, ADA was also interested in the GT regulations. Team principals Ian Harrower and Chris Crawford looked for a simple, low-cost option and chose the De Tomaso Pantera, a marque that had last raced at Le Mans in 1979. A car was sourced and made race-ready with a steel rollcage and carbon/kevlar shell made by Dallara. A 5.0-litre Ford V8 was prepared by the Lozano brothers in Texas which made 500 bhp with the restrictor.

=== IMSA GTS ===
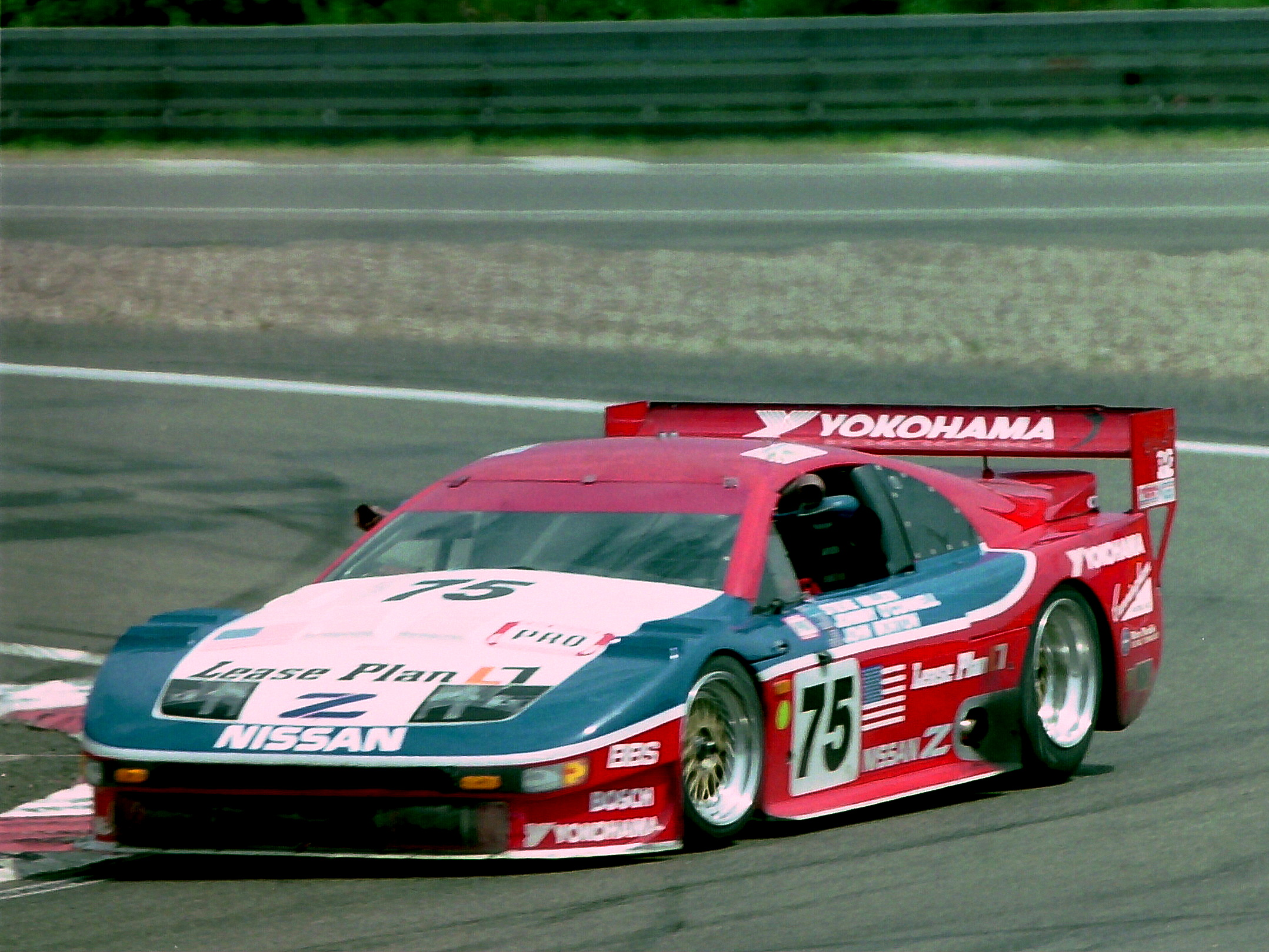
Nissan 300ZX

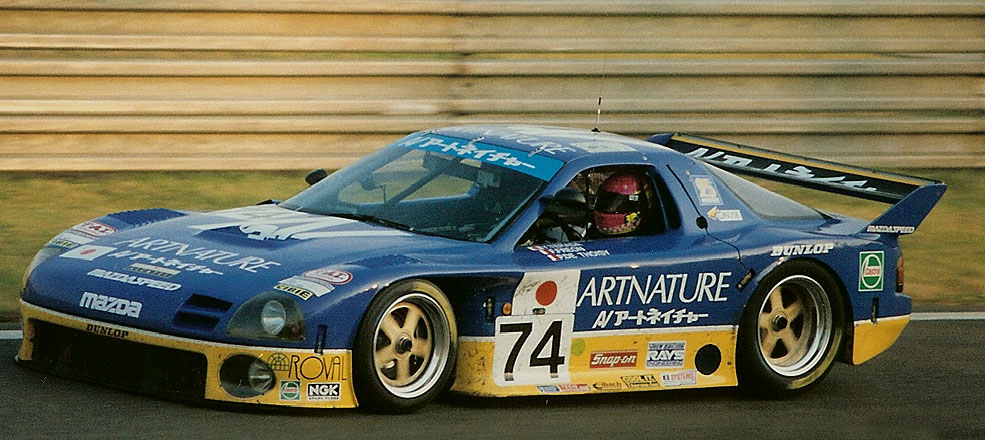
Mazda RX-7

The IMSA-GT Supreme category had evolved out of IMSA-GTO, and this year was the principal class for the IMSA Championship. For a decade, Nissan had enjoyed major success in the IMSA series with derivations of its Nissan 300ZX, initially in the GTP class and latterly the GTO class. In 1992, New Zealander Steve Millen won the inaugural GTS trophy with Clayton Cunningham Racing. This year, the team had won both the Daytona and Sebring endurance races against WSC competition, and so the Cunningham team saw themselves as a possible chance for outright victory at Le Mans. The 3.0-litre twin-turbo V6 was now putting out 750 bhp, however the hefty front-engine car was over 200 kg heavier than the LM-P1 cars, and over-estimating the downforce needed, the top speed was only 295 kph (185 mph). Sebring winners Millen, Johnny O'Connell and John Morton had one car while Daytona winner Paul Gentilozzi was matched up with Eric van der Poele and Shunji Kasuya.

Mazda had also had notable success latterly in IMSA-GTO, principally through Jim Downing's Downing-Atlanta Racing team. That programme was ended in 1991 as Mazda looked to develop a new WSC car. Yojiro Terada was a veteran of 14 Le Mans and who had been part of the Le Mans-winning Mazdaspeed team in 1991. In Japan, Terada spotted the Downing RX-7s, and asked Mazdaspeed if he could loan one to run in the GTS category at Le Mans. They agreed, albeit with some scepticism. The car had a steel spaceframe with aluminium and carbonfibre panels. Its 2.6-litre quad-rotary engine had previously put out 600 bhp but now had to be detuned to 500 bhp with the new regulations. Terada had the two Frenchmen, Franck Fréon and Pierre de Thoisy as his co-drivers.

== Practice and Qualifying ==
With the new LMP regulations trimming power, as well as reducing downforce by 50%, unsurprisingly the Group C cars struggled and were about 10 seconds slower than previously. The surprise of the first session was Patrick Gonin in the little LM-P2 WR-Peugeot, who set the fastest time (3:52.6). In attempting to outpace him, Lionel Robert crashed his Courage. However, in the second session at 11.30pm, Alain Ferté put his Courage on pole with a 3:51.1 – a first for the team. On Thursday, as temperatures dropped again at dusk, Bell put in a 3:51.8 to also start on the front row. Gonin was unable to improve his time due to clutch issues, which also stopped Marc Rostan from setting a qualifying time. He was thus ineligible to start, and Gonin and Petit would be the final 2-driver line-up seen in a Le Mans race. The four cars in the LM-P2 class were scattered right through the grid. The WRs were streets ahead of the other two, in 3rd and 10th overall. The Debora was 30th, almost 30 seconds back (4:27.3), while the Harrier was crashed on Thursday at the Porsche Curves. It was repaired in time to qualify – albeit in final spot on the grid (48th – 4:44.2).

Stuck was the best of the Dauer 962 drivers, qualifying 5th (3:53.7) – a time almost 20 seconds slower than the best time laid down by a Group C 962, set by Oscar Larrauri in 1990. Baldi was 7th with 3:54.9 that was still 12 seconds faster than the next GT car. Between them was Lionel Robert in the second Courage (3:54.3). Having set the fastest time at the test weekend, he missed out on a quick time when he nudged the barrier on a flying lap. Millen did well to get his Nissan 300ZX inside the top-10, qualifying 9th (3:57.1), with the other team car in 12th. The other competitor in the class, the Art Nature Mazda RX-7, was 20th, 13 seconds back. The drivers had been suffering vicious instability on the long straights. Jun Herada did well with the ADA ex-Group C Porsche 962 to qualify 13th (4:07.1). Beyond the Dauer-Porsches, the next GT was the Team Ennea Ferrari F40 starting in 14th, just ahead of Olivier Grouillard in the Jacadi Racing Venturi and the Bugatti. The big, heavy Vipers struggled through practice and qualified near the back of the grid over 30 seconds behind the Ferrari (in 41st and 47th place). In GT2, it was the Corvette surprising the paddock by putting in the fastest time, with a 3:17.2 putting it 18th on the grid and one-and-a-half seconds ahead of Hahne's Honda (21st) and Larrauri in the Ferrari 348 (22nd). With the GTs mixing it up with the sports cars, it was looking like the ACO had got the equivalence formula about right.

== Race ==
=== Start ===
Saturday was a sunny, cloudless day. In the morning warm-up, there was drama for the Cunningham team, when the Nissan of Paul Gentilozzi caught fire approaching Indianapolis. The team did very well to have it ready in time for the race. Just an hour before race-start, the Synergie team found their Bugatti had a fuel leak near the top of the tank. With no time to replace it, they sealed the leak with superglue and resolved to drive cautiously to start, until the fuel level had dropped, and the glue had properly dried. From the rolling start, Bell deliberately wound up the turbo-boost on the Kremer and blasted off into the lead at the Dunlop Curve. However, that lead only lasted to the second chicane on the back straight when Ferté's Courage, later on the brakes, passed him. By the end of the second lap Baldi, in the Dauer, had also got past Bell. His teammate, Stuck, made an uncharacteristic error and had spun at the first chicane to be left back in 8th. On the first run through the Porsche curves, Ricci's Courage and Regout's WR collided. Both cars pitted and fell to the back of the field. Also in trouble on the first laps were the GT1 Ferrari, the De Tomaso and Stephane Ratel's Venturi (that all spun off into the sand-traps) and the Debora, with a major oil leak.

With their fuel-tank advantage, the Dauers were going to be running 13-15 laps before refuelling, compared to the 11-12 laps (40 minutes) of the Toyotas and Courages. And so, at the two-hour mark, after the first fuel-stops had been cycled through, the two Dauer-Porsches were placed 1-2 and looking to run away with the race. That fuel advantage would build to about a dozen less fuel-stops over the course of 24 hours, so the Toyotas took to double-stinting their wider tyres to shorten their alternate pit-stops and make up a bit of time. Meanwhile, the other fancied teams were falling away – the Courages were a lap behind, struggling in the heat with their hard Michelins not getting enough grip through the corners. The Nissans were not up to the pace, as they had been at Daytona and Sebring, and inside two hours the van der Poele/Gentilozzi/Kasuya car was parked with turbo problems. Meanwhile, the other car held down a solid 7th place into the night, behind the LM P1s.

But the Dauers' race was then compromised by mishaps, handing the advantage back to the Toyotas – Dalmas cut his fuel-mileage too fine and ran out just as he got to the pit-lane, losing time as the marshals pushed him to his garage, fortunately at the near end of the pits. Then Sullivan had a left-rear puncture in the leading car, just as he approached the Ford Chicane. Forced onto the grass he spun on the track just opposite the pit-entry. Not permitted to reverse back to get across, he had to limp all the way around again, costing him 11 minutes. But his care ensured no further damage was done to the shell. At the 4-hour mark, Irvine was leading in his Toyota, having done 58 laps, with the Haywood Dauer back up to second and two minutes back, ahead of the other Toyota. With the evening cooled, the Courages changed over to softer tyres and the boost to performance was quickly apparent. They were a lap back, while the second Dauer was sixth, Millen's Nissan GTS seventh and the Kremer eighth. In the GT classes, the Callaway Corvette had led for the first two hours until waylaid. Anders Olofsson, the pro-driver in the Team Ennea Ferrari F40, had overcome the first-lap setback and was now running 9th overall, just ahead of the Larbre Porsche 911 now leading GT2. The duel between Larbre and Callaway continued through the evening as the two cars broke into the top-10 overall.

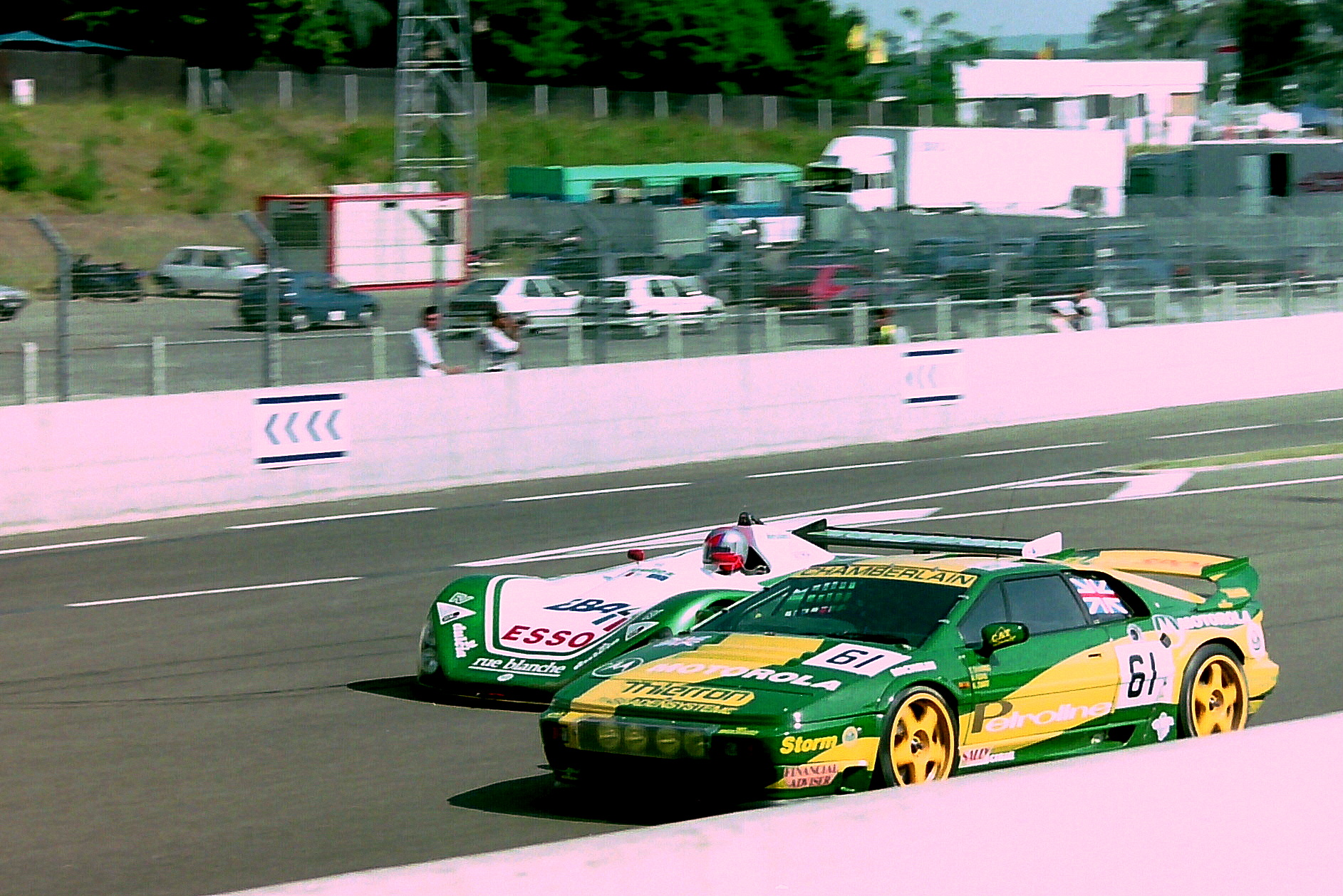
WR LM94 passing Lotus Esprit

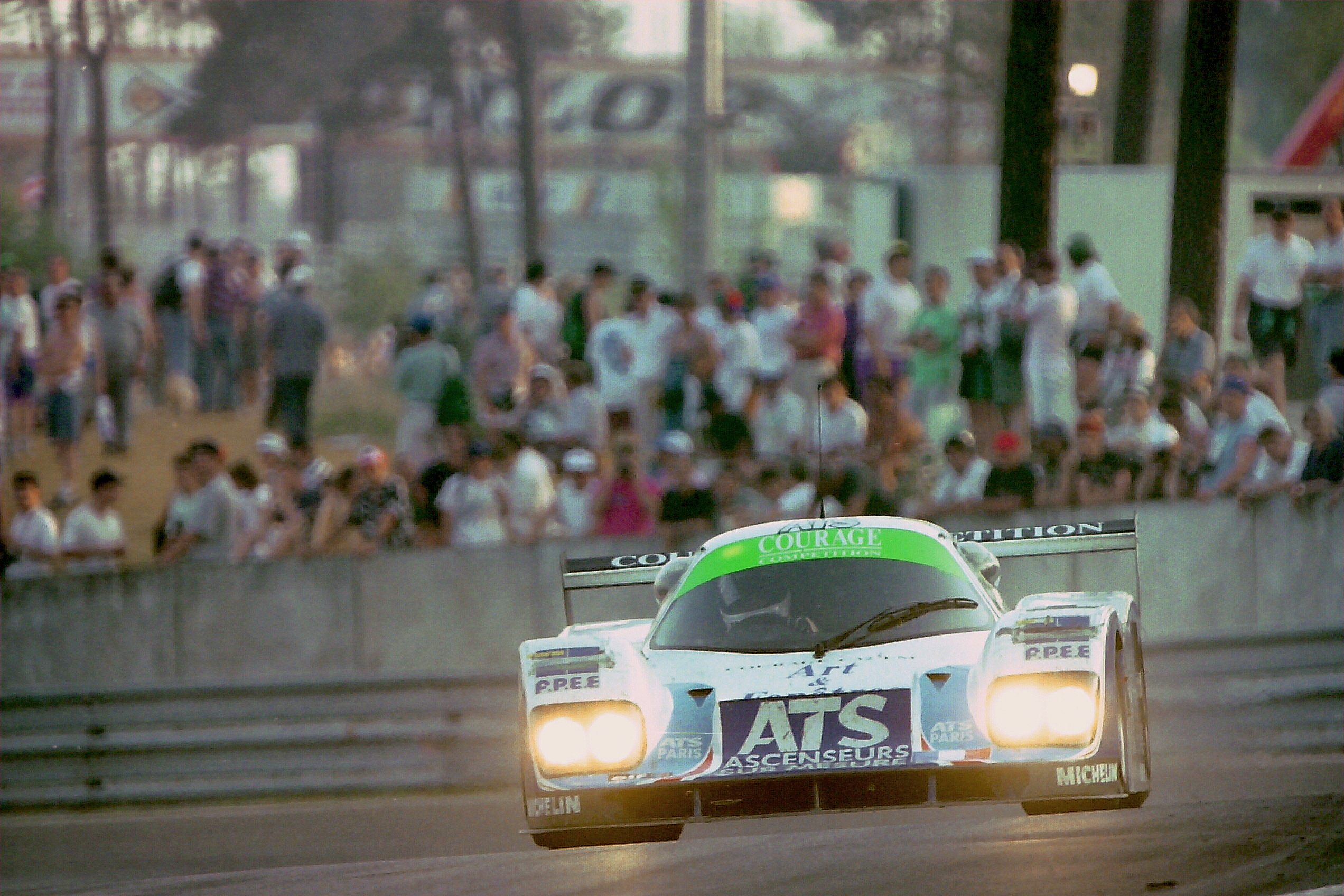
Courage of Ferté/Pescarolo/Lagorce exiting the Esses

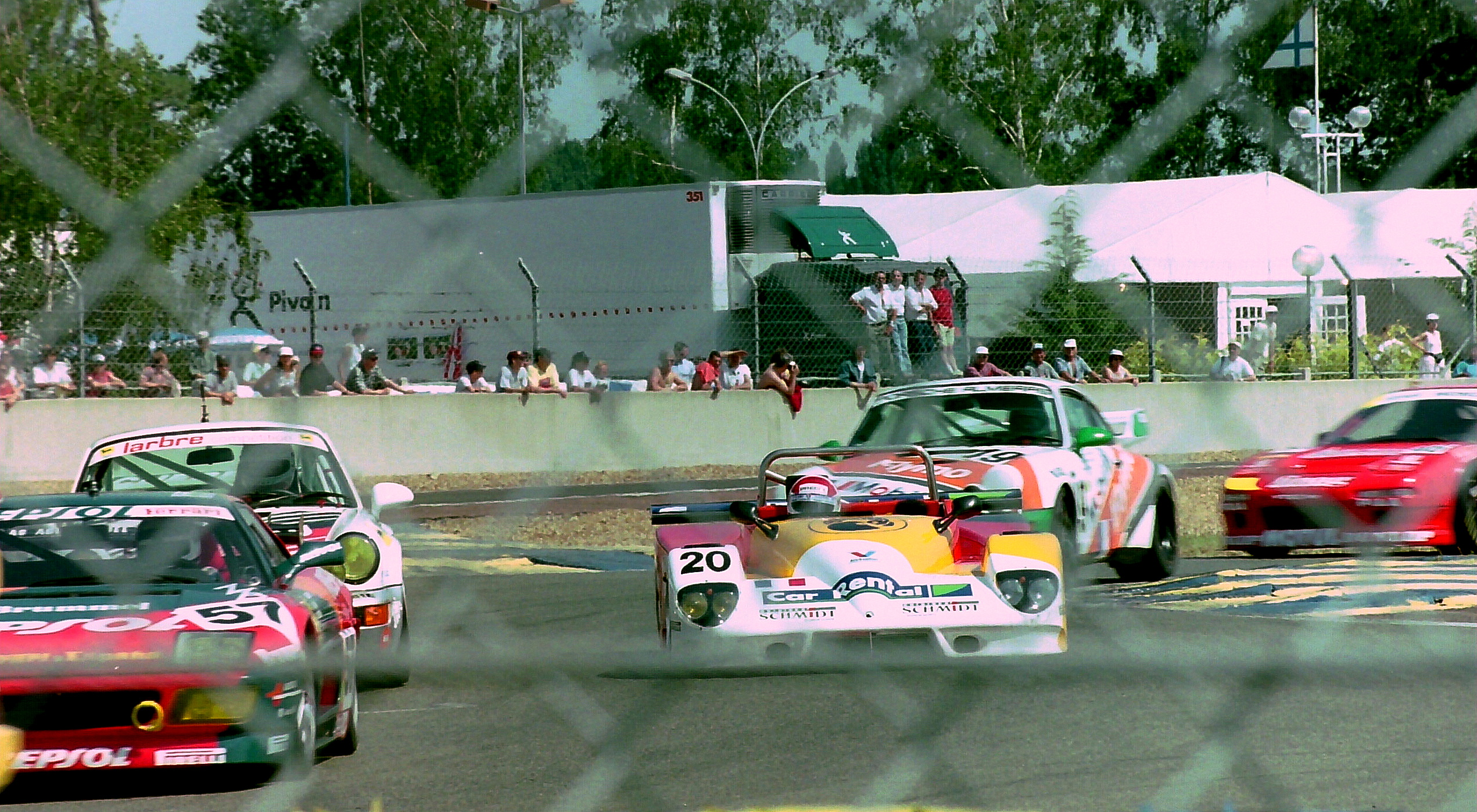
Congestion at the Ford Chicanes

In a curious coincidence, all four cars in the LMP2 retired in the 11th hour, in the small hours of Sunday. When all three faster cars had problems in the first hour, it was the Harrier, that had started last on the grid, that led the class for the first two hours. The WR team could not maintain their momentum from practice. After the first-lap shunt cost 20 minutes, Regout was stopped on-track at 5.30pm by electrical issues. Over an hour was spent repairing the fuel system, but they were put out by a broken oil-pump. Gonin had run the sister car out of fuel coming to the first stop, but letting the engine cool, was able to creep back to the pits on the reserve tank. Ninety minutes were then spent fixing an oil-leak before a major engine-fire at Arnage abruptly ended their race. After their engine repairs at the start of the race, the Debora resumed in last place (48th). They had made their way back up to 30th when rookie Pascal Dro crashed at 1.30am. Unfortunately, in its second stint the front suspension of the Harrier collapsed – a legacy of its practice crash. Four hours spent undergoing repairs were all for nought when it happened again soon after resuming.

The first of three brakepad change for the SARD Toyota gave the lead to Fouché in the Nisso-Trust Toyota. At 9.15pm, trying to avoid a charging Toyota in the Porsche Curves, Chéreau in the Larbre Porsche clouted the barrier then swiped Richard Piper in the Chamberlain Lotus. With a broken wheel, the marshals would not let Piper carry onto the pits. Not long before, the other Chamberlain car had had the same argument with officials when it stopped at Arnage after a rear wheel came adrift following suspension failure. Neither Lotus was allowed to continue. So, after 6 hours, the Toyotas were running 1-2; the Wollek car ahead of Irvine's. Third was the rejuvenated Pescarolo Courage followed by the two Dauers with the second Courage between them. Seventh was the American Nissan, then the Gulf Kremer. Boris Said's Callaway Corvette, having recently got past the Larbre and Konrad Porsches, now led GT2. The challenge from the factory-supported Lotus, Honda and Ferrari teams never eventuated, as they encountered their problems. As dusk fell, Bell brought the Kremer prototype in from 8th several times to cure a vibration. It was finally fixed by replacing the rear wing, but they lost four places in the process.

=== Night ===
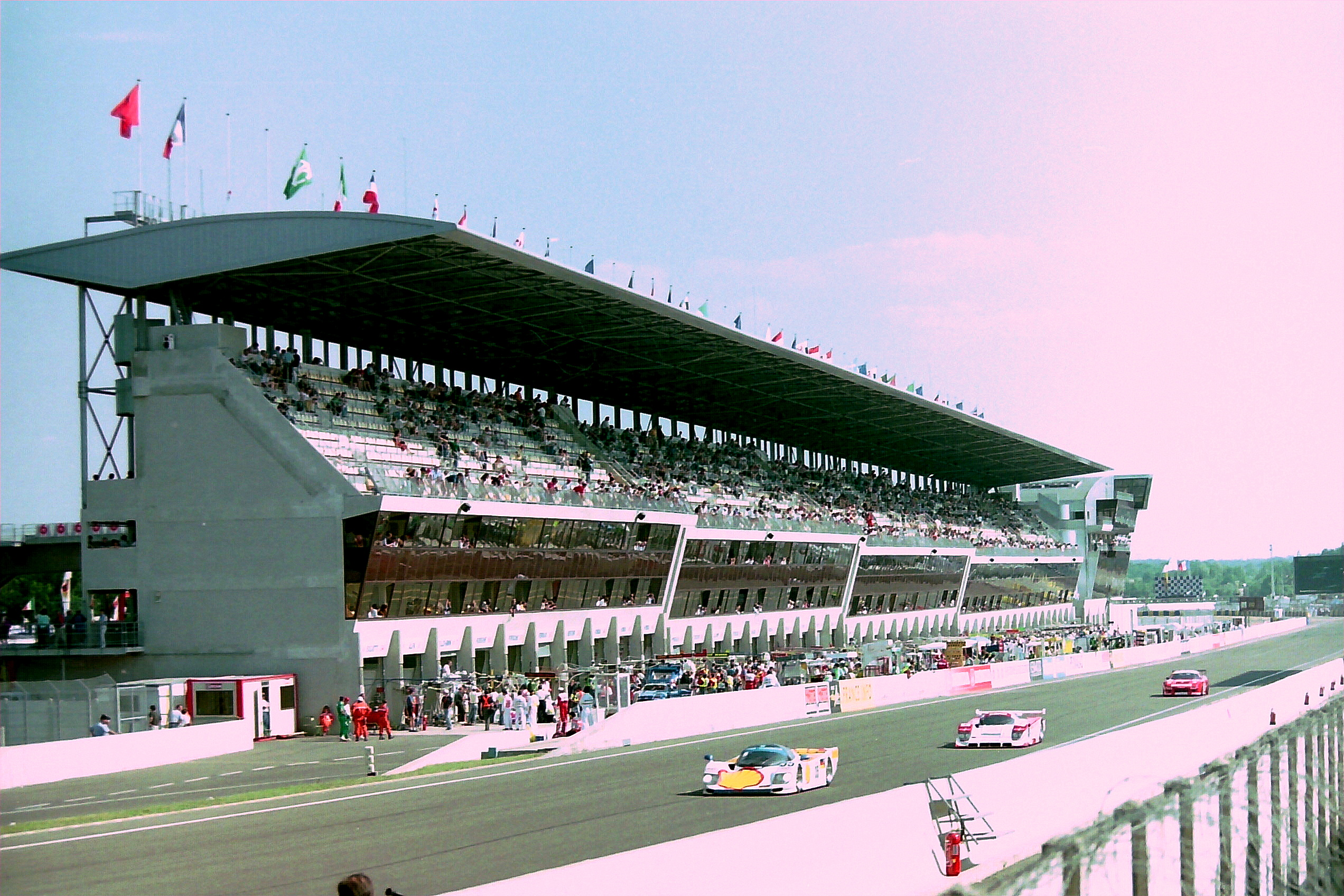
The pit complex

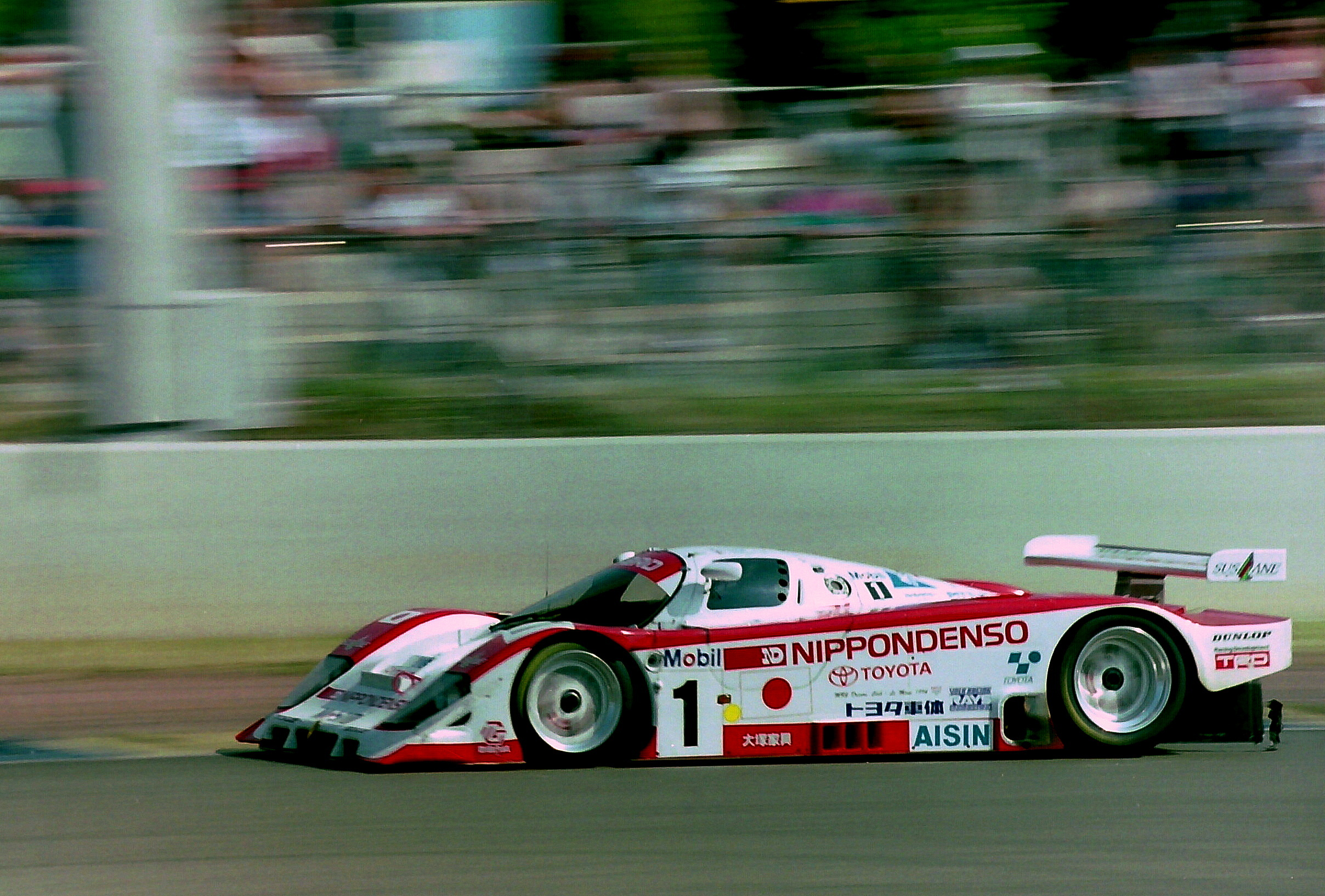
Irvine at speed in the Toyota

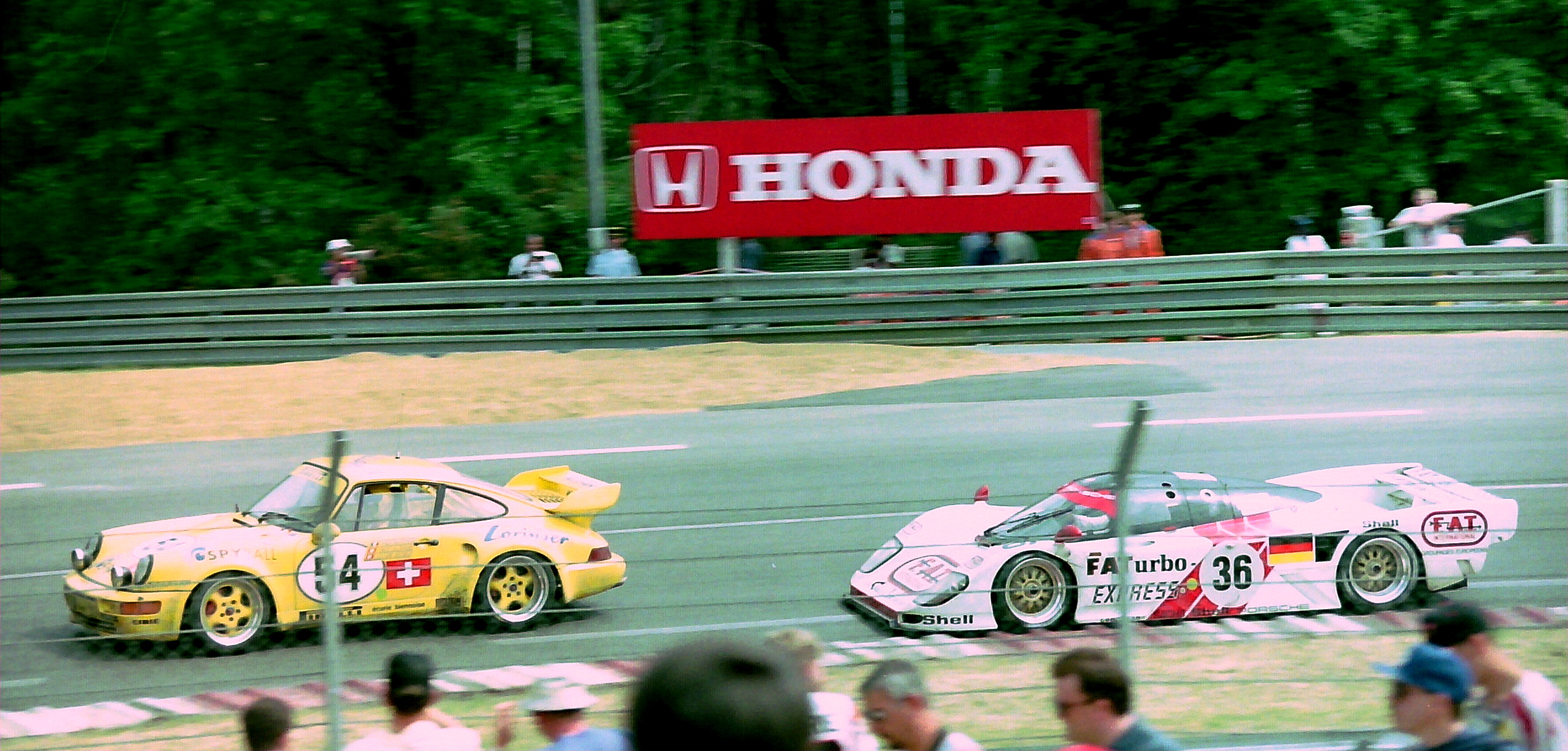
Two Porsches- the Écurie Biennoise 911 finished 2nd in class, being passed by the overall-winning Dauer 962

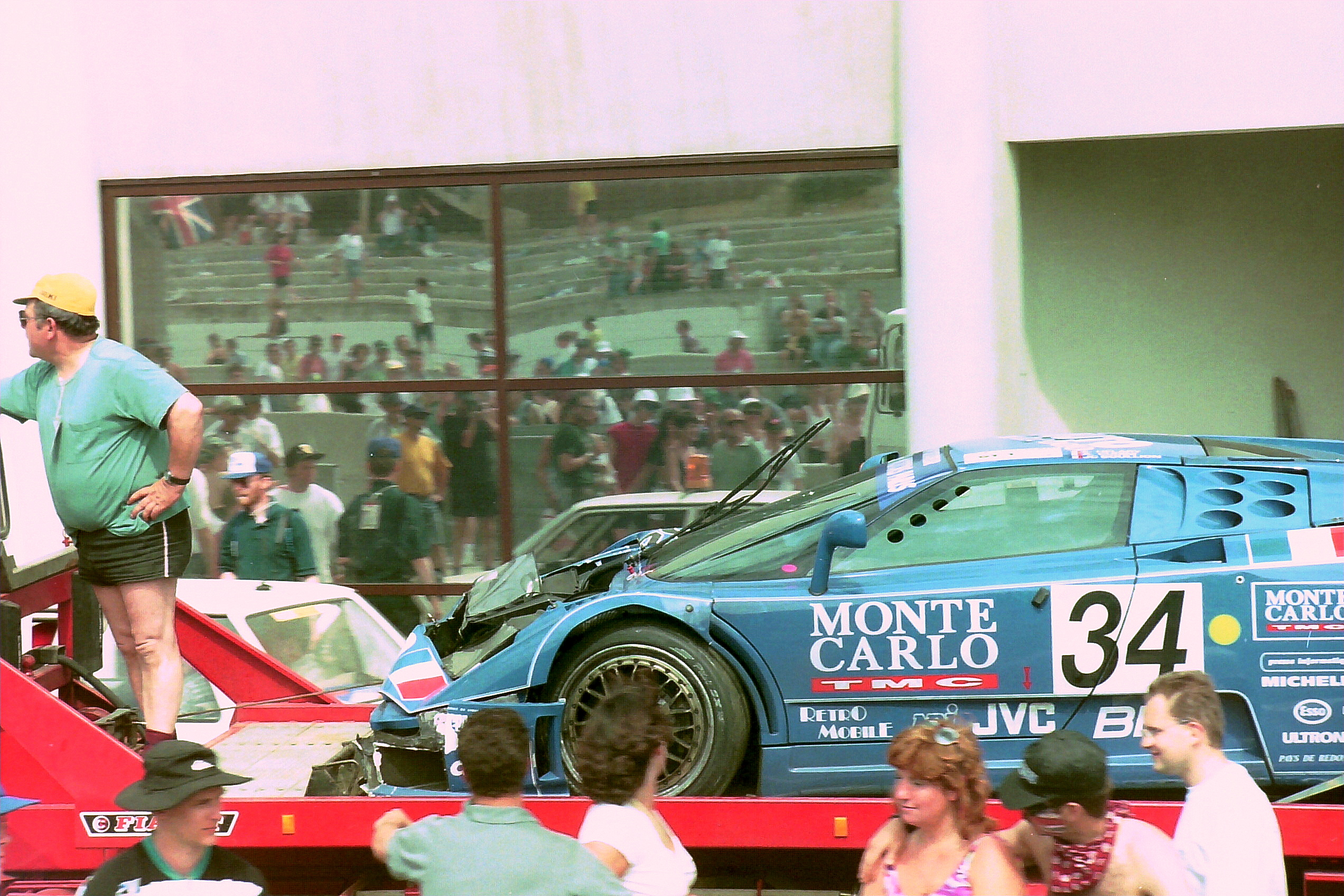
End for the Bugatti

As night fell, Haywood limped into the pits with the second-placed Dauer came into the pits. The oil had drained out and the driveshaft had to be replaced, costing four laps and dropping them to 6th. Then at 11.30, the Robert/Raphanel/Fabre Courage retired from fifth with engine failure. Less than 3 hours later, the same problem befell the sister car of Pescarolo/Ferté/Lagorce while running in 4th – both were factory-supplied Porsche engines. The Ferrari F40 had struck electronics problems in the fourth hour, dropping them well down the field, eventually retiring around midnight. The Bugatti was now going very quickly and battled with the Callaway and the Larbre Porsche through the night, swapping 8th, 9th and 10th between them. However, the Callaway lost the fight at 2.30am when Maisonneuve, after missing his pit-board twice, ran out of fuel in the Porsche Curves. When a mechanic went out with a fuel can, and the car somehow later limped back to the pits two hours later, the ACO officials disqualified the car for on-track refuelling. At midnight, after 8 hours, the SARD Toyota had a two-minute lead over the other Toyota. Stuck's Dauer was a lap back with Pescarolo in 4th two laps down and Dalmas three laps down in the other Dauer. Millen was six laps behind in sixth, unable to match the pace of the LMP cars, while the recovering Kremer was moving back up the field into the top-10 again. Bell had a big moment during the night when the throttle stuck open as he approached Indianapolis at full speed:

"It was bloody hairy. I pressed the brake hard, hoping it might shock the throttle into returning. It didn’t work, so I put the clutch in as well, revved the hell out of it, turned it off at the same time, and went around the corner without any lights."

The old Porsche 962 of ADA Engineering had been moving up the field and was now running a strong 12th overall. However, early in the new day, Yoshikawa lost all lights and was stranded on the Mulsanne to wait until dawn to be able to creep back to the pits.

At halftime, The Toyotas were still running 1-2. Boutsen was third in the #35 Dauer. He was speeding down the hill from the Esses to Tertre Rouge at 260 kph (160 mph) when his lights all went out. He was able to toggle the switch and get them on again but immediately pitted for a new integrated nose-section. Further delays dropped it 3 laps behind the leader. At 5am, the Nisso-Trust Toyota came into the pits from the lead with a severe vibration. It took nearly an hour to replace the differential, dropping it down to 5th. The SARD Toyota took over the lead and had the pursuing Dauer-Porsche's covered. With the demise of the Courages and the Kremer, it was the remaining Nissan 300ZX of Millen/O'Connell/Morton that steadily moved up to 4th by dawn. The Arnoux/Bell/Balas Viper had lost its 5th gear after the first hour, and then 6th gear after the second. But they kept soldiering on, climbing up the board. The new team had a mission to get to the end and drove a conservative race. At the halfway stage, they were 13th overall. Soon after the crew called the car in for a full 12-hour service taking a half-hour but only dropping one place.

=== Morning ===
Through the night the two Toyotas tussled for the lead, alternating depending on pit-strategy. At dawn, the Nissan Trust Toyota lost its lead when transmission vibrations finally became too serious to ignore. It took 54 minutes for a full gearbox change and dropped the car to fifth. Soon after, Boutsen had another incident in his Dauer when he whacked a kerb at the second Mulsanne chicane and broke a rear wishbone, which then cost 13 minutes to repair. The remaining Nissan had lost time fixing a thrown engine belt, but had otherwise run very well. Then, soon after midday while holding 4th place, the car was hit with gearbox issues that cost a number of laps and dropped them to 5th. Another one with problems was the ADA Porsche. Having spent early Sunday morning waiting for dawn, it was then hit mid-morning with a blown head-gasket six hours later. The team parked the car for the rest of the race, waiting to re-emerge in the last hour to take the chequered flag. The Bugatti had been steadily moving up the field during the night, getting up to 6th overall by breakfast time. It was duelling with the Porsche RSR of Dominique Dupuy. Although up to 15 seconds a lap faster, the thirstier Bugatti had to refuel every 50 minutes, whereas the Porsche could do twice that. However, at breakfast time, it was afflicted by turbo problems and needed an extended time in the pits. Eventually, all four turbos had to be replaced (one of them twice) and the team plummeted down to 20th.

=== Finish and post-race ===
The SARD Toyota had inherited the lead at breakfast time and held it right through the morning. Then, at 2.20pm, after leading for 9 hours with a 40-second lead, Krosnoff came to a stop at the pit exit without drive – a weld had broken on the gear-linkage leaving him with no gears. Jumping out, he reached around at the rear and manually slammed it into 3rd gear, then managed to get back to his pitbox. Taking 13 minutes to repair the gear-linkage dropped the Toyota to 3rd behind the two Dauer-Porsches, who were both now nursing fragile driveshafts themselves. Rejoining with 80 minutes to go, Irvine got in and drove hard to catch up. Team manager Singer was very concerned about the driveshafts of both cars. Boutsen was just 15 seconds ahead and on old tires. For an hour they duelled – the straight-line speed of the Dauer against the cornering of the Toyota. Then with just two laps, and ten minutes, to go, Irvine got his chance. Backmarkers were slowing up to make it to the end and Boutsen got baulked in the Porsche Curves. On fresher tyres, Irvine carried his speed and passed him braking for the Ford Chicanes, to immense cheers from the enthralled crowd. Now Boutsen harried Irvine, scattering the marshals lining the track with their traditional end-of-race flag-salute. He had a half-chance coming into the Ford chicanes for the last time, but Irvine held on to take second - by less than a second.

The thrilling battle of the leading three cars meant they finished 15 laps ahead of the second Toyota. Fifth was the Cunningham Nissan, 11 laps behind, taking the GTS class win. They had had a fairly consistent race, always in the top-10, and were looking good for a solid fourth until they were delayed at lunchtime by a gearbox problem. Derek Bell's Kremer was sixth, and the five-time winner got one of the loudest cheers when he stepped out of his car. After a black flag during the night to fix faulty tail-lights, the car had run consistently. The surviving Courage was fairly trouble-free and had been 7th for the last 6 hours, finishing over 450 km behind the leader.

The first two GT2 cars home, in 8th and 9th, were Porsches from the Larbre and new Écurie Biennoise teams - both had run like clockwork. The Konrad Porsche finishing in 10th had a gearbox rebuild on Saturday night. However, these were the only GT Porsches to finish, with the other seven falling by the wayside. With the view that Porsche was exploiting the rules, many journalists gave the "moral victory" in GT1 to the Dodge Viper, that finished 12th. Despite running into problems with their sequential gearboxes, all three Honda GTs finished, giving good heart to the company executives after their first foray to Le Mans. Not classified was the second Dodge Viper. Stymied by a 2-hour gearbox rebuild early in the race, they then had four oil pump failures. The last of which occurred within minutes of the end, and Gache was unable to complete the final lap within the maximum time allowed. The Bugatti failed to finish – after all its issues through the morning, in the final hour a tyre failure approaching the first chicane speared Bouillon off into the barrier, just missing Arnoux's Viper. The Mazda RX-7 was the only other finisher in the GTS class, back in 15th. Running as high as 11th as night fell, they had lost a lot of time through the night and into Sunday successively fixing the throttle assembly, a broken windscreen, suspension failure and a jammed differential. Just getting classified was seen as success. Those not fortunate enough to be classified, despite crossing the line, included both of the ADA cars (the De Tomaso and Porsche 962), and the "snakeskin" BBA Venturi that went out for the final ten minutes on only 4 cylinders, after being parked up for the last 5 hours. Venturi had a wretched Le Mans with none of the other cars reaching the finish-line.

The win gave Porsche its 13th victory, and for the drivers it was Haywood's 3rd, Dalmas' 2nd and the first for Mauro Baldi - who became the 100th different Le Mans winner. Once again, Toyota had been thwarted in their quest for outright victory. Following the Le Mans success, Dauer was able to sell twelve of the 962 road-cars. Porsche had many years of experience at Le Mans, whereas most of the GT1 challengers were present for the first time, and the results showed that, with most of the cars retiring or suffering major mechanical setbacks. Larbre won two more of the BPR series, for a total of 4 of the 8 races. In the US, Cunningham Racing achieved a 1-2 in the IMSA GTS championship with their Nissan 300ZX, after winning six of the nine races. IMSA subsequently ruled the cars V6 twin-turbo ineligible for the 1996 season. The growing success of the BPR series and growing interest from GT manufacturers boded well. Alongside this, the launch of the WSC prototypes in IMSA meant the future of Le Mans and endurance racing was looking more and more positive.

== Official results ==
=== Finishers ===
Results taken from Quentin Spurring's book, officially licensed by the ACO
Class Winners are in Bold text.

Pos	Class	No.	Team	Drivers	Chassis	Engine	Tyre	Laps
1	**LM-GT1**	**36**	**(West Germany) Le Mans Porsche Team**	**(France) Yannick Dalmas** **(United States) Hurley Haywood** **(Italy) Mauro Baldi**	Dauer 962 Le Mans	Porsche 935/82 3.0L F6 twin turbo	G	344
2	**LM-P1/C90**	**1**	**(Japan) Toyota Team SARD**	**(United Kingdom) Eddie Irvine** **(Italy) Mauro Martini** **(United States) Jeff Krosnoff**	Toyota 94C-V	Toyota R36V 3.6L V8 twin-turbo	D	343
3	LM-GT1	35	(West Germany) Le Mans Porsche Team	(West Germany) Hans-Joachim Stuck (United States) Danny Sullivan (Belgium) Thierry Boutsen	Dauer 962 Le Mans	Porsche 935/82 3.0L F6 twin turbo	G	343
4	LM-P1/ C90	4	(Japan) Nisso Trust Racing Team	(Sweden) Steven Andskär (South Africa) George Fouché (France) Bob Wollek	Toyota 94C-V	Toyota R36V 3.6L V8 twin-turbo	D	328
5	**IMSA-GTS**	**75**	**(United States) Clayton Cunningham Racing**	**(New Zealand) Steve Millen** **(United States) Johnny O'Connell** **(United States) John Morton**	Nissan 300ZX	Nissan VRH35 3.0L V6 twin-turbo	Y	317
6	LM-P1/C90	5	(United Kingdom) Gulf Oil Racing (private entrant)	(United Kingdom) Derek Bell (United Kingdom) Robin Donovan (West Germany) Jürgen Lässig	Kremer K8 Spyder	Porsche 935/76 3.0L F6 twin turbo	D	316
7	LM-P1/C90	9	(France) Courage Compétition	(France) Jean-Louis Ricci (United States) Andy Evans (Belgium) Philippe Olczyk	Courage C32LM	Porsche 935/82 3.0L F6 twin turbo	MI	310
8	**LM-GT2**	**52**	**(France) Larbre Compétition**	**(Spain) Jesús Pareja** **(France) Dominique Dupuy** **(Spain) Carlos Palau**	Porsche 911 Carrera RSR	Porsche M64 3.8L F6	MI	307
9	LM-GT2	54	(Switzerland) Écurie Biennoise (private entrant)	(Switzerland) Enzo Calderari (Switzerland) Lilian Bryner (Italy) Renato Mastropietro	Porsche 911 Carrera Cup	Porsche M64 3.8L F6	P	299
10	LM-GT2	59	(West Germany) Konrad Motorsport	(Netherlands) Cor Euser (Netherlands) Patrick Huisman (Slovenia) Matjaž Tomlje	Porsche 911 Carrera RSR	Porsche M64 3.8L F6	P	295
11	LM-GT2	57	(Spain) Repsol Ferrari España (private entrant)	(Spain) Prince Alfonso de Orléans-Borbón (Spain) Tomás Saldaña (Spain) Andrés Vilariño	Ferrari 348 GT Competizione	Ferrari Tipo F119 3.4L V8	P	276
12	LM-GT1	40	(France) Rent-A-Car Racing (Belgium) Luigi Racing (private entrant)	(France) René Arnoux (United Kingdom) Justin Bell (France) Bertrand Balas	Dodge Viper RT/10	Dodge SRT/10 8.0L V10	MI	273
13	LM-GT2	60	(France) Legeay Sports Mécanique (private entrant)	(France) Benjamin Roy (France) Luc Galmard (France) Jean-Claude Police	Alpine A610	Renault PRV 3.0L V6 twin turbo	MI	272
14	LM-GT2	48	(West Germany) Kremer Honda Racing	(West Germany) Armin Hahne (France) Christophe Bouchut (Belgium) Bertrand Gachot	Honda NSX	Honda 3.0L V6	D	257
15	IMSA-GTS	74	(Japan) Team Art Nature (private entrant)	(Japan) Yojiro Terada (France) Franck Fréon (France) Pierre de Thoisy	Mazda RX-7	Mazda 13J-M 2.6L quad-rotary	D	250
16	LM-GT2	46	(West Germany) Kremer Honda Racing	(Switzerland) Philippe Favre (Japan) Hideki Okada (Japan) Kazuo Shimizu	Honda NSX	Honda 3.0L V6	D	240
17	LM-GT2	68 reserve	(Italy) Agusta Racing Team	(France) Jean-Louis Sirera (Spain) Antonio Puig (Spain) Xavier Camp	Venturi 400 GTR	Renault PRV 3.0L V6 twin turbo	D	225
N/C**	LM-GT1	41	(France) Rent-A-Car Racing (Belgium) Luigi Racing (private entrant)	(France) François Migault (France) Denis Morin (France) Philippe Gache	Dodge Viper RT/10	Dodge SRT/10 8.0L V10	MI	225
18	LM-GT2	47	(West Germany) Kremer Honda Racing (Japan) Team Kunimitsu	(Japan) Kunimitsu Takahashi (Japan) Keiichi Tsuchiya (Japan) Akira Iida	Honda NSX	Honda 3.0L V6	Y	222
N/C*	LM-GT1	30	(France) BBA Sport et Compétition	(France) Jean-Luc Maury-Laribière (France) Bernard Chauvin (France) Hervé Poulain	Venturi 600 LM	Renault PRV 3.0L V6 twin turbo	D	221
N/C*	LM-GT1	37	(United Kingdom) ADA Engineering (private entrant)	(United Kingdom) Dominic Chappell (United Kingdom) Jonathan Baker (United Kingdom) Phil Andrews	De Tomaso Pantera	Ford 302 5.0L V8	G	210
N/C*	LM-P1/C90	6	(United Kingdom) ADA Engineering (Japan) Team Nippon (private entrant)	(Japan) Jun Harada (Japan) Tomiko Yoshikawa (Japan) Masahiko Kondo	Porsche 962C GTi	Porsche 935/83 3.0L F6 twin turbo	G	189
N/C*	LM-GT2	65	(Italy) Agusta Racing Team	(France) Stéphane Ratel (Switzerland) Franz Hunkeler (France) Edouard Chaufour	Venturi 400 GTR	Renault PRV 3.0L V6 twin turbo	D	137

- Note *: Not Classified for failing to cover sufficient distance (70% of the winner) by the race's end.
- Note **: Not Classified for setting the last lap time too slow.

=== Did not finish ===
Pos	Class	No	Team	Drivers	Chassis	Engine	Tyre	Laps	Reason
DNF	LM-GT1	34	(France) M. Hommel (private entrant)	(France) Alain Cudini (France) Éric Hélary (France) Jean-Christophe Boullion	Bugatti EB110 SS	Bugatti 3.5L V12 quad turbo	MI	230	Accident (24hr)
DNF	LM-P1/C90	2	(France) Courage Compétition	(France) Henri Pescarolo (France) Alain Ferté (France) Franck Lagorce	Courage C32LM	Porsche 935/82 3.0L F6 twin turbo	MI	142	Engine (11hr)
DSQ	LM-GT2	51	(United States) Callaway Competition	(West Germany) Frank Jelinski (United States) Boris Said (France) Michel Maisonneuve	Callaway Corvette; Super Natural	Chevrolet LTI 6.2L V8	Y	142	Refuelled on circuit (14hr)
DNF	LM-GT1	31	(Italy) Agusta Racing Team	(Italy) Riccardo “Rocky” Agusta (France) Michel Krine (Italy) Almo Coppelli	Venturi 600 LM	Renault PRV 3.0L V6 twin turbo	D	115	Fire (13hr)
DNF	LM-GT1	38	(France) Jacadi Racing	(France) Michel Ferté (Belgium) Michel Neugarten (France) Olivier Grouillard	Venturi 600 LM	Renault PRV 3.0L V6 twin turbo	MI	107	Engine (13hr)
DNF	LM-P1/C90	3	(France) Courage Compétition	(France) Lionel Robert (France) Pascal Fabre (France) Pierri-Henri Raphanel	Courage C32LM	Porsche 935/82 3.0L F6 twin turbo	MI	107	Engine (9hr)
DNF	LM-P2	21	(France) Welter Racing	(France) Patrick Gonin (France) Pierre Petit	WR LM93	Peugeot 405T16 1.9L S4 turbo	MI	104	Fire (11hr)
DNF	LM-GT1	33	(West Germany) Konrad Motorsport (Belgium) Patrick Nève Racing (private entrant)	(Austria) Franz Konrad (Brazil) Antônio Hermann de Azevedo (West Germany) Mike Sommer	Porsche 911 Turbo	Porsche M64 3.6L F6 twin turbo	P	100	Engine (10hr)
DNF	LM-P1/C90	7	(United Kingdom) Stealth Engineering (France) SBF Team (private entrant)	(France) Dominique Lacaud (France) Sylvain Boulay (France) Bernard Robin	ALD C6	BMW M88 3.5L S6	G	96	Engine (12hr)
DNF	LM-GT2	49	(France) Porsche Alméras (France) Larbre Compétition	(France) Jacques Alméras (France) Jean-Marie Alméras (France) Jacques Laffite	Porsche 911 Carrera RSR	Porsche M64 3.8L F6	P	94	Accident (10hr)
DNF	LM-P2	22	(France) Welter Racing	(Belgium) Hervé Regout (France) Jean-François Yvon (France) Jean-Paul Libert	WR LM94	Peugeot 405T16 1.9L S4 turbo	MI	86	Suspension (11hr)
DNF	LM-GT2	58	(West Germany) Seikel Motorsport	(West Germany) Thomas Bscher (United Kingdom) Lindsay Owen-Jones (Denmark) John Nielsen	Porsche 968 RS	Porsche 3.0L S4 turbo	Y	84	Accident (9hr)
DNF	LM-P2	20	(France) Didier Bonnet Racing (private entrant)	(France) Georges Tessier (France) Pascal Dro (Switzerland) Bernard Santal	Debora LM-P294	Alfa Romeo 164QF 3.0L V6	P	79	Accident (11hr)
DNF	LM-P1/C90	8 reserve	(France) R. Bassaler (private entrant)	(France) Nicolas Minassian (France) Patrick Bourdais (France) Olivier Couvrier	Alpa LM	Cosworth DFZ 3.5L V8	G	64	Suspension (13hr)
DNF	LM-GT2	50	(France) Larbre Compétition	(France) Jack Leconte (France) Pierre Yver (France) Jean-Luc Chéreau	Porsche 911 Carrera RSR	Porsche M64 3.8L F6	MI	62	Accident (6hr)
DNF	LM-GT2	62	(United Kingdom) Lotus Sport (United Kingdom) Chamberlain Engineering	(United Kingdom) Richard Piper (United Kingdom) Peter Hardman (France) Olindo Iacobelli	Lotus Esprit Sport 300	Lotus 907 2.2L S4 turbo	MI	59	Accident (6hr)
DNF	LM-GT2	55	(United Kingdom) Simpson Engineering (private entrant)	(United Kingdom) Robin Smith (Italy) "Stingbrace" (Stefano Sebastiani) (Japan) Tetsuya Ota	Ferrari 348 LM	Ferrari Tipo F119 3.4L V8	Y	57	Gearbox (13hr)
DNF	LM-GT2	45	(West Germany) Heico Service (private entrant)	(West Germany) Ulrich Richter (West Germany) Karl-Heinz Wlazik (West Germany) Dirk Ebeling	Porsche 911 Carrera RSR	Porsche M64 3.8L F6	P	57	Engine (6hr)
DNF	LM-GT1	29	(Sweden) B. Strandell (private entrant) (West Germany) Obermaier Racing	(Sweden) Anders Olofsson (Switzerland) Sandro Angelastri (Italy) Max Angelelli	Ferrari F40 GTE	Ferrari Tipo F120 3.0 L V8 twin-turbo	P	51	Electrics (9hr)
DNF	LM-P2	63	(United Kingdom) Chamberlain Engineering	(New Zealand) Rob Wilson (United Kingdom) David Brodie (United Kingdom) William Hewland	Harrier LR9 Spyder	Cosworth BDG 2.0L S4 turbo	D	45	Suspension (11hr)
DNF	LM-GT2	56	(Switzerland) Scuderia Chicco d'Oro (private entrant)	(Switzerland) Olivier Haberthur (France) Patrice Goueslard (France) Patrick Vuillaume	Porsche 911 Turbo	Porsche M64 3.6L F6 turbo	G	42	Turbocharger (8hr)
DNF	LM-GT2	66	(United Kingdom) Bristow Racing (Norway) E. Henriksen (private entrant)	(United Kingdom) Ray Bellm (United Kingdom) Harry Nuttall (United Kingdom) Charles Rickett	Porsche 911 Carrera RSR	Porsche M64 3.8L F6	G	38	Engine (4hr)
DNF	LM-GT2	61	(United Kingdom) Lotus Sport (United Kingdom) Chamberlain Engineering	(Denmark) Thorkild Thyrring (Netherlands) Klaas Zwart (West Germany) Andreas Fuchs	Lotus Esprit Sport 300	Lotus 907 2.2L S4 turbo	MI	28	Suspension (7hr)
DNF	IMSA-GTS	76	(United States) Clayton Cunningham Racing	(Belgium) Eric van de Poele (United States) Paul Gentilozzi (Japan) Shunji Kasuya	Nissan 300ZX	Nissan VRH35 3.0L V6 twin-turbo	Y	25	Electrics (4hr)
DNF	LM-GT2	64	(Italy) Repsol Ferrari Club Italia (private entrant)	(Argentina) Oscar Larrauri (Italy) Fabio Mancini (France) Joël Gouhier	Ferrari 348 GT Competizione	Ferrari Tipo F119 3.4L V8	P	23	Engine (5hr)

=== Did not start ===
Pos	Class	No	Team	Drivers	Chassis	Engine	Tyre	Reason
DNQ	LM-GT1	39	(France) Jacadi Racing	(France) Paul Belmondo (France) Ferdinand de Lesseps (France) Jacques Tropenat	Venturi 600 LM	Renault PRV 3.0L V6 twin turbo	**MI**	Did not qualify
DNQ	LM-GT2	53	(Italy) Scuderia Fabio Magnani (private entrant)	(France) Christian Heinkélé (France) Guy Kuster (Netherlands) John Hugenholtz	Lotus Esprit Sport 300	Lotus 907 2.2L S4 turbo	**P**	Did not qualify
Res	LM-GT1	43	(France) JCB Racing (private entrant)	(France) Jean-Claude Basso (France) Claude Meigemont (France) François Migault (Belgium) Philippe Olczyk	Venturi 600 LM	Renault PRV 3.0L V6 twin turbo		Insufficient garage space
Res	LM-GT1	44	(France) BBA Sport & Compétition (private entrant)	(France) Éric Graham (France) François Birbeau (Switzerland) Laurent Lécuyer	Venturi 600 LM	Renault PRV 3.0L V6 twin turbo	**D**	Insufficient garage space
Res	LM-GT2	69	(France) G. Chotard (private entrant)	(France) "Segolen" (André Gahinet) (France) Didier Caradec (France) Jean-Louis Le Duigou	Porsche 911 Carrera RSR	Porsche M64 3.8L F6		Insufficient garage space
Res	LM-P1/C90	13	(France) Courage Compétition		Courage C41	Chevrolet 4.5 V8	**MI**	Reserve Entry
Res	LM-GT2	42	(West Germany) Gustl Spreng Racing (private entrant)	(West Germany) Gustl Spreng (West Germany) Fritz Müller	Porsche 911 Carrera RSR	Porsche M64 3.8L F6		Reserve Entry
Res	LM-GT2	67	(France) P. Boirdon (private entrant)	(France) Patrick Boirdon (France) Jean-Marc Massé (France) Philippe Sinault (France) Jérôme Brarda	Porsche 911 Carrera 2	Porsche M64 3.8L F6		Reserve Entry
Res	LM-GT2	70	(West Germany) Mühlbauer Motorsport (private entrant)	(West Germany) Alexander Mattschull (West Germany) Arnold Mattschull (Switzerland) Toni Seiler (Switzerland) Sandro Angelastri	Porsche 911 Carrera RSR	Porsche M64 3.8L F6		Reserve Entry
Res	LM-GT2	71	(West Germany) Konrad Motorsport	(Austria) Franz Konrad	Porsche 911 Carrera RSR	Porsche M64 3.8L F6	**P**	Reserve Entry
DNA	IMSA-WSC	14	(United States) Brix Racing	(Canada) Jeremy Dale (United States) Bob Schader (Italy) Ruggero Melgrati	Spice HC94	Oldsmobile 5.0L V8		Did not arrive
DNA	IMSA-WSC	15	(United States) Screaming Eagles Racing	(United States) Craig T. Nelson (United States) Dan Clar	Spice SE90C	Lexus 1UZ-FE 4.0L V8		Did not arrive
DNA	IMSA-WSC	16	(United States) Pegasus Racing	(West Germany) Oliver Kuttner (United States) Jim Downing (United States) Mike Sheehan (Austria) Dieter Quester	Argo JM19C	BMW M88 3.5L S6		Did not arrive

=== Class winners ===
Class	Winning car	Winning drivers
LM-P1/C90	#1 Toyota 94C-V	Irvine / Martini / Krosnoff
LM-P2	no finishers	
LM-GT1	#36 Dauer 962LM	Baldi / Dalmas / Haywood
LM-GT2	#52 Porsche 911 Carrera RSR	Pareja / Dupuy / Palau
IMSA-GTS	#75 Nissan 300 ZX	Morton / Millen / O’Connell
Note *: being new classes, all results became distance records for the circuit.

== Statistics ==
Taken from Quentin Spurring's book, officially licensed by the ACO

- Pole Position – A. Ferté, #2 Courage C32LM - 3:51.1; 211.9 km/h (131.7 mph)
- Fastest Lap – T. Boutsen, #35 Dauer 962GT-LM; 210.5 km/h (130.8 mph)
- Winning Distance – 4,685.7 km (2,911.6 mi)
- Winner's Average Speed – 195.2 km/h (121.3 mph)
- Attendance - 140000
