= Venturi Atlantique LM =

Sports race car

Venturi 500 LM Venturi 600 LM Venturi 600 S-LM
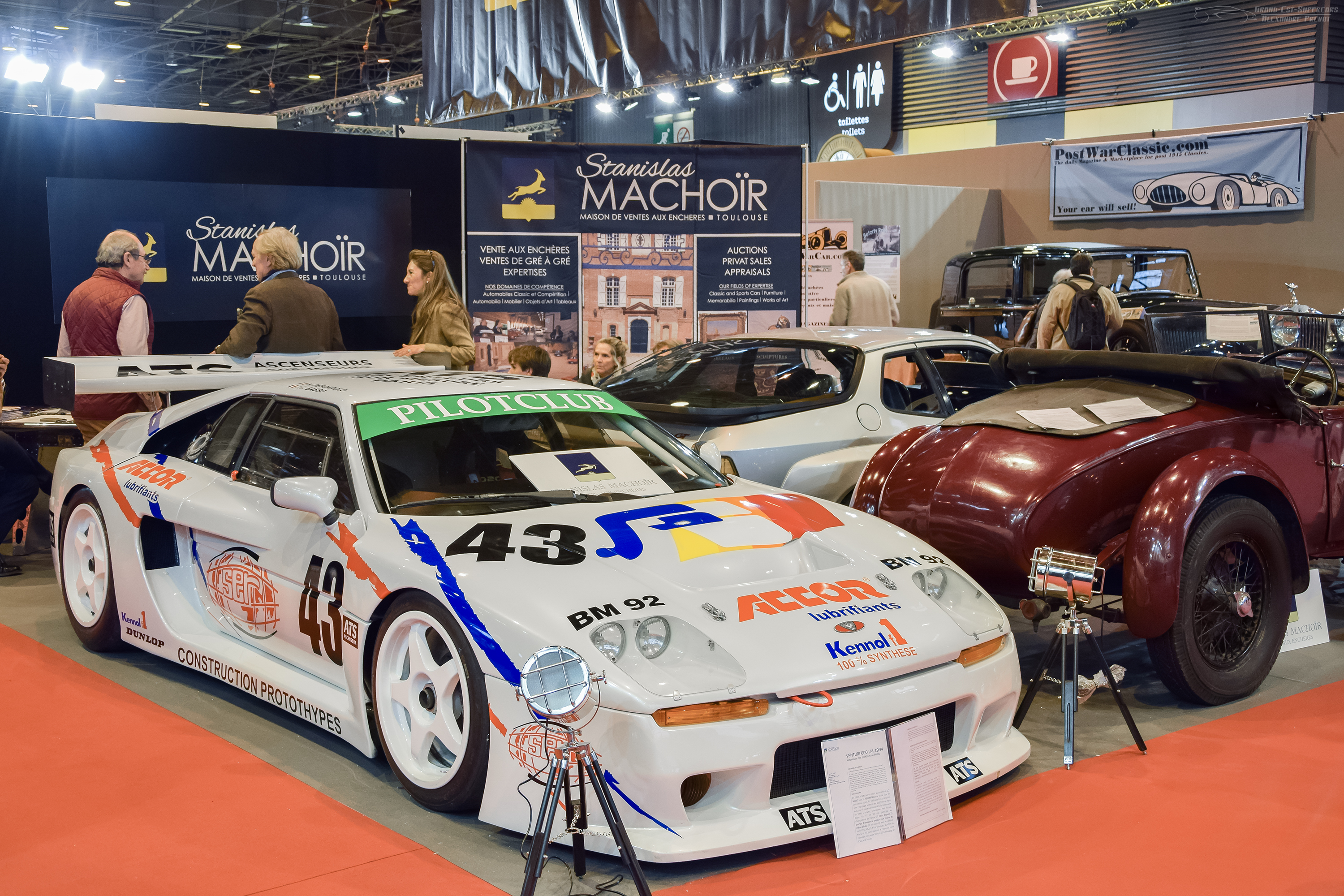
- Venturi 600 LM
- Category: GT2 (later GT1)
- Constructor: Venturi
- Production: 1993-1996

Technical specifications
- Chassis: Unitary steel tubular spaceframe with central backbone, kevlar body
- Suspension: double wishbones, coil springs over shock absorbers, anti-roll bar
- Length: 4,240 mm (166.9 in)
- Width: 1,840 mm (72.4 in)
- Height: 1,180 mm (46.5 in)
- Axle track: 1,500 mm (59.1 in) (front); 1,590 mm (62.6 in) (rear)
- Wheelbase: 2,500 mm (98.4 in)
- Engine: PRV 3.0 L (183.1 cu in) 90° DOHC V6 twin-turbocharged
- Transmission: 5-speed: manual; later Hewland 6-speed sequential manual
- Power: ~ 500–705 hp (373–526 kW); 480–550 lb⋅ft (650–750 N⋅m)
- Weight: 2,116–2,491 lb (960–1,130 kg)
- Brakes: Disc brakes

Competition history

The Venturi Atlantique LM is a high-performance racing-oriented version of the Venturi Atlantique road car, designed, developed, and built by French manufacturer Venturi, for sports car racing between 1993 and 1996. It started out as the Venturi 500 LM in 1993, then eventually evolving into the Venturi 600 LM in 1994, before finally becoming the Venturi 600 S-LM in 1995. In 1995 the Venturi 600 LM won the 1000 km of Paris with Henri Pescarolo and Jean-Claude Basso.
