= Venturi Eclectic =

The Venturi Eclectic is a zero emission car, running on solar sourced electric power, from the French/ Monegasque car manufacturer Venturi owned by Gildo Pastor. It functions as a small renewable energy production and storage plant (with a roof mounted solar panel and it's wind turbine) and can be recharged at any outlet of the power grid. It was designed by Sacha Lakic.

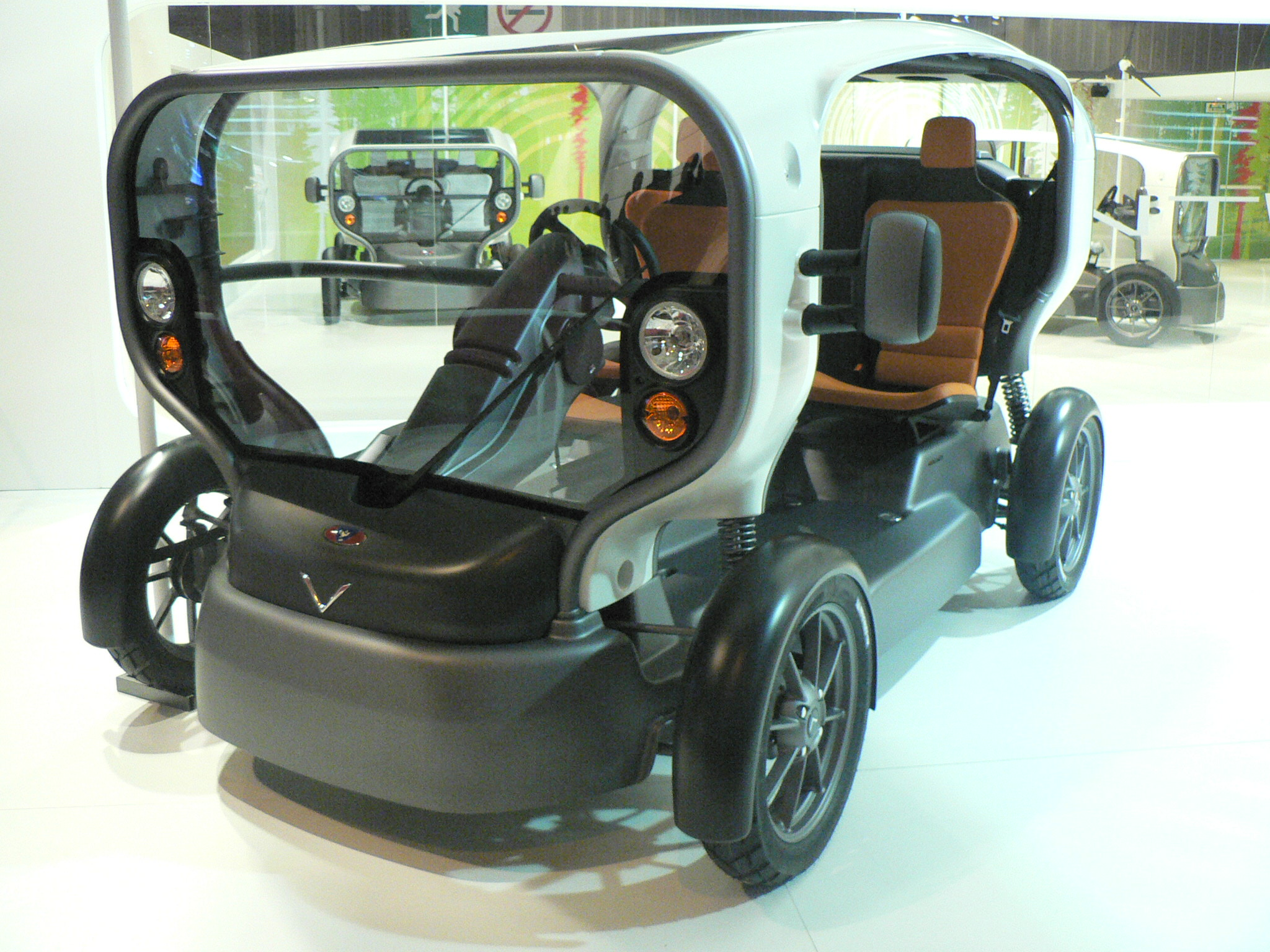
Venturi Eclectic Concept 1 at the Paris Motor Show 2006

The Eclectic concept appeared at the Paris Motor Show in 2006, and was mentioned in Time Magazine's Best Inventions of 2007.

It is designed with 3 seats in a V-formation, with the driver at the apex, and has open sides. It is an urban car and has a range of 50 kilometres (31 mi) and a maximum speed of 50 kilometres per hour (31 mph).

== Eclectic 2.0 ==
The Eclectic 2.0 is designed on similar principles but is more compact. It has more limited accommodation but would be more readily driven (and parked) in a crowded urban environment. The Eclectic 2.0 was first revealed at the 2008 Paris Motor Show.

== Production ==
2010 was a strategic year for Venturi with the launch of construction of an assembly plant for its electric vehicles in Sablé-sur-Sarthe. However, despite the planned production here of three types of electric vehicle (the Eclectic, the Voxan Wattman electric motorcycle, and a three-wheeler utility vehicle) the factory closed in 2015. The Eclectic nevertheless remains noteworthy as the first solar-powered car developed with mass production in mind.
