= Venturi (company) =

Monaco-based automotive manufacturing company

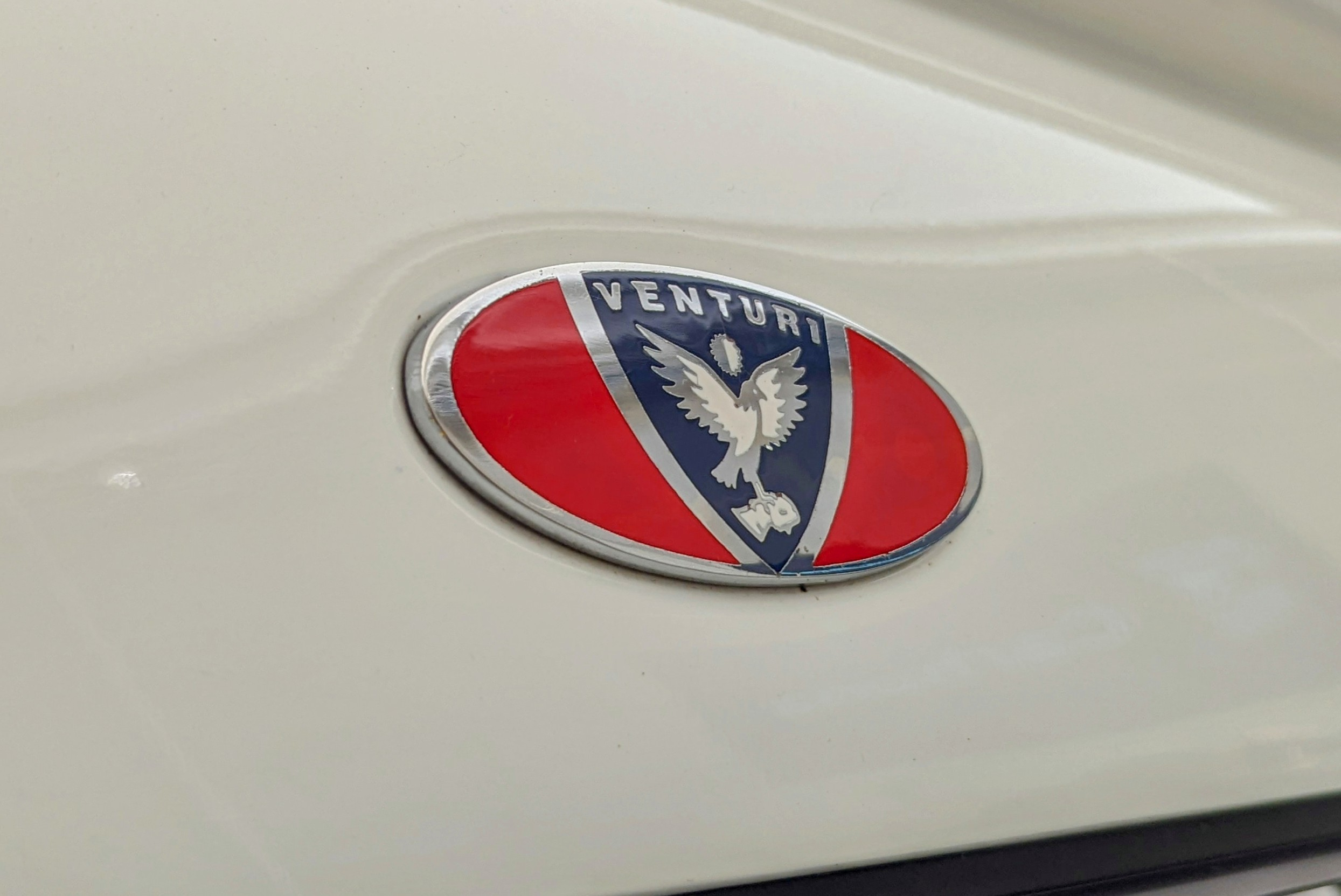
- Type: Private
- Industry: Automotive
- Founded: 1984
- Founder: Claude Poiraud; Gérard Godfroy
- Headquarters: Monaco
- Key people: Gildo Pallanca Pastor, CEO
- Owner: Gildo Pallanca Pastor
- Subsidiaries: Voxan
- Website: https://www.venturi.com/

Venturi is a Monaco-based automotive manufacturer. Founded in 1984 by French engineers Claude Poiraud and Gérard Godfroy as MVS (Manufacture de Voitures de Sport). Venturi operated for nearly sixteen years, before declaring bankruptcy in 2000. The same year, Monegasque Gildo Pallanca Pastor purchased Venturi, and decided to focus on electric-powered motors.

== Overview ==
The first team to commit to the Formula E World Championship, Venturi competed under the name of ROKiT Venturi Racing with its drivers Edoardo Mortara and Lucas di Grassi during its last season, in 2022.

In April 2022, Venturi announced that it would be applying its knowledge to the challenges of space. The brand entered into strategic partnerships with Venturi Lab (Switzerland) and Venturi Astrolab (United States) in order to be a candidate for the development of mobility technologies for the Moon.

On 31 March 2023, the Venturi Group announced that its American strategic partner Venturi Astrolab had signed an agreement with Elon Musk's company SpaceX to send the FLEX rover to the Moon in 2026.

On 19 June 2023, at the Salon international de l'aéronautique et de l'espace de Paris-Le Bourget, Venturi presented the lunar wheel designed by Venturi Lab for the FLEX rover. It is made up of 192 cables and is presented as being hyper-deformable, even at the very low temperatures of the Moon's South Pole.

On 3 April 2024, Venturi Group announces that the American company Venturi Astrolab, Inc. (Astrolab), a strategic partner of Venturi Group, has awarded a NASA contract to support the development of Artemis campaign's lunar terrain vehicle. Its rover, known as FLEX, is equipped with batteries and wheels developed by Gildo Pastor's teams in Monaco and Switzerland.

== History ==
=== From 1984 to 2000 ===
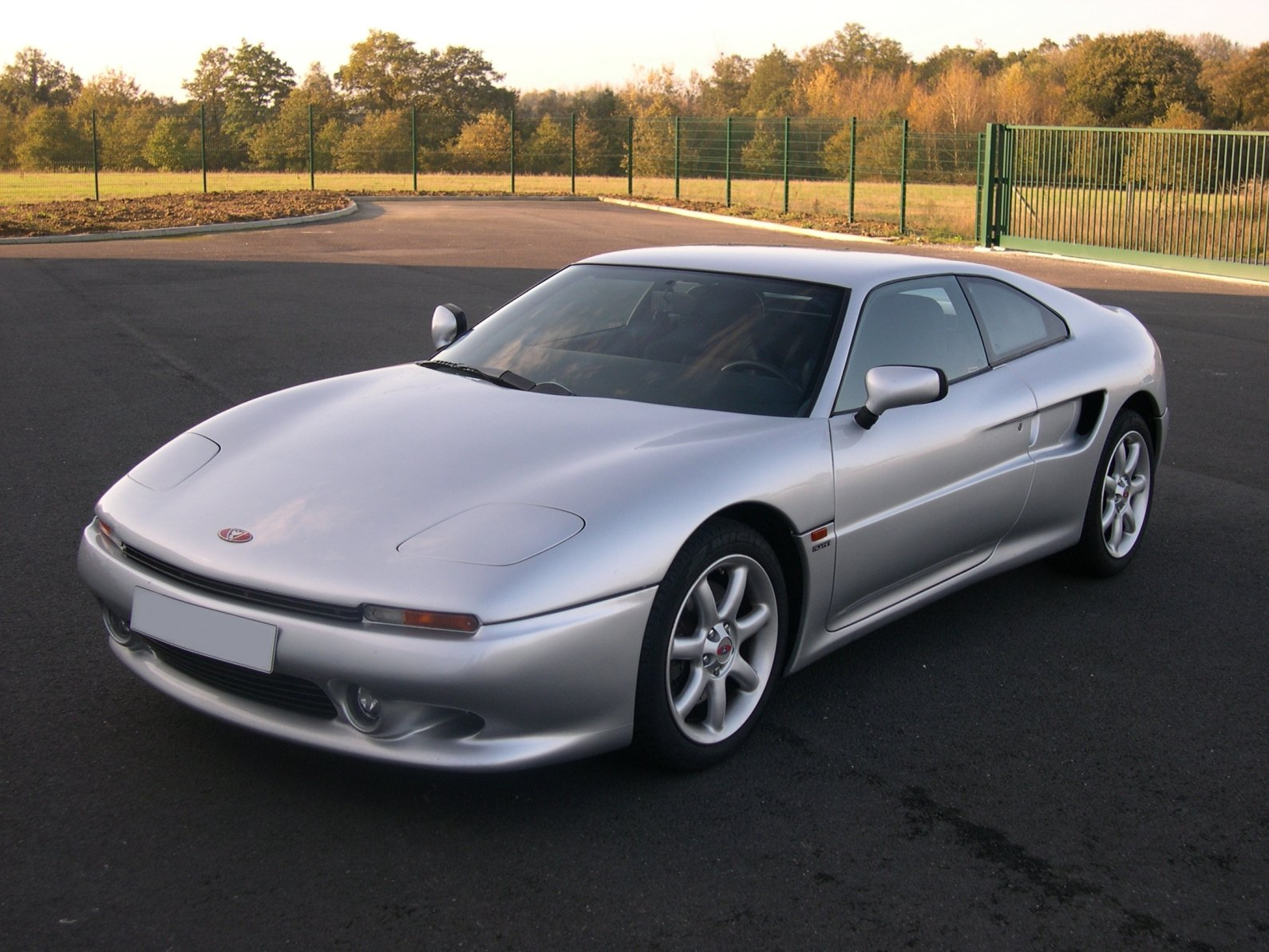
Venturi 300 Atlantique

The first Venturi came out in 1984, created by Claude Poiraud and Gérard Godfroy, two former engineers at Heuliez. The goal was to present the only "Grand Tourisme" French car capable of competing with the English Aston Martin, the Italian Ferrari, and the German Porsche. The first car shown had a Volkswagen Golf GTi engine and the name was originally spelled "Ventury", with a "y" at the end. In 1985, the car was shown with a 200 PS (147 kW) Peugeot 505 Turbo engine, but by the 1986 Paris Motor Show it had reached its definitive form with the PRV V6 engine. Production began in 1987, with five cars built in the first year with production increasing in the subsequent years. The headquarters of the company was located in Couëron, Pays de Loire, where almost 750 cars were produced in the forthcoming 20 years.

From 1987 to the mid-1990s, they built mid-engined coupés and roadsters with turbocharged PRV engines and Renault gearboxes. Engine power ranged from 200 to 260 PS (147 to 191 kW) for the then offered MVS Venturi Coupé and Transcup series. The naturally aspirated Venturi 160 used the catalyzed 2849 cc version of the PRV V6; this was meant to be sold in Japan and was therefore also available with an automatic transmission. There was also the 185 PS (136 kW) Venturi 180, mainly developed for Italy, which used the turbocharged 1995-cc inline-four Douvrin engine from the Renault 21 Turbo.

Venturi was also briefly involved with the Larrousse Formula One team. The team's 1992 car, which bore the Venturi name, was designed and built by Venturi Larousse UK, a British company formerly known as Fomet 1, which had previously designed the 1991 Fondmetal Formula One cars.

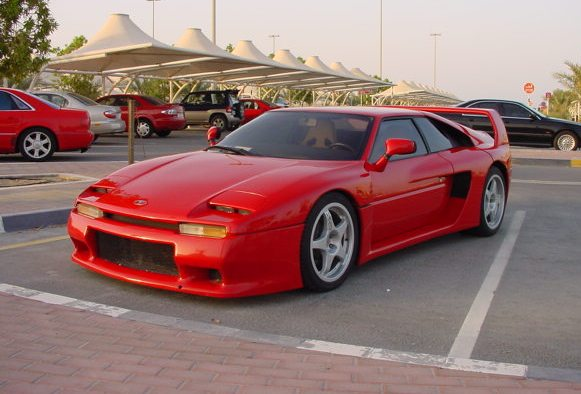
Venturi 400 GT

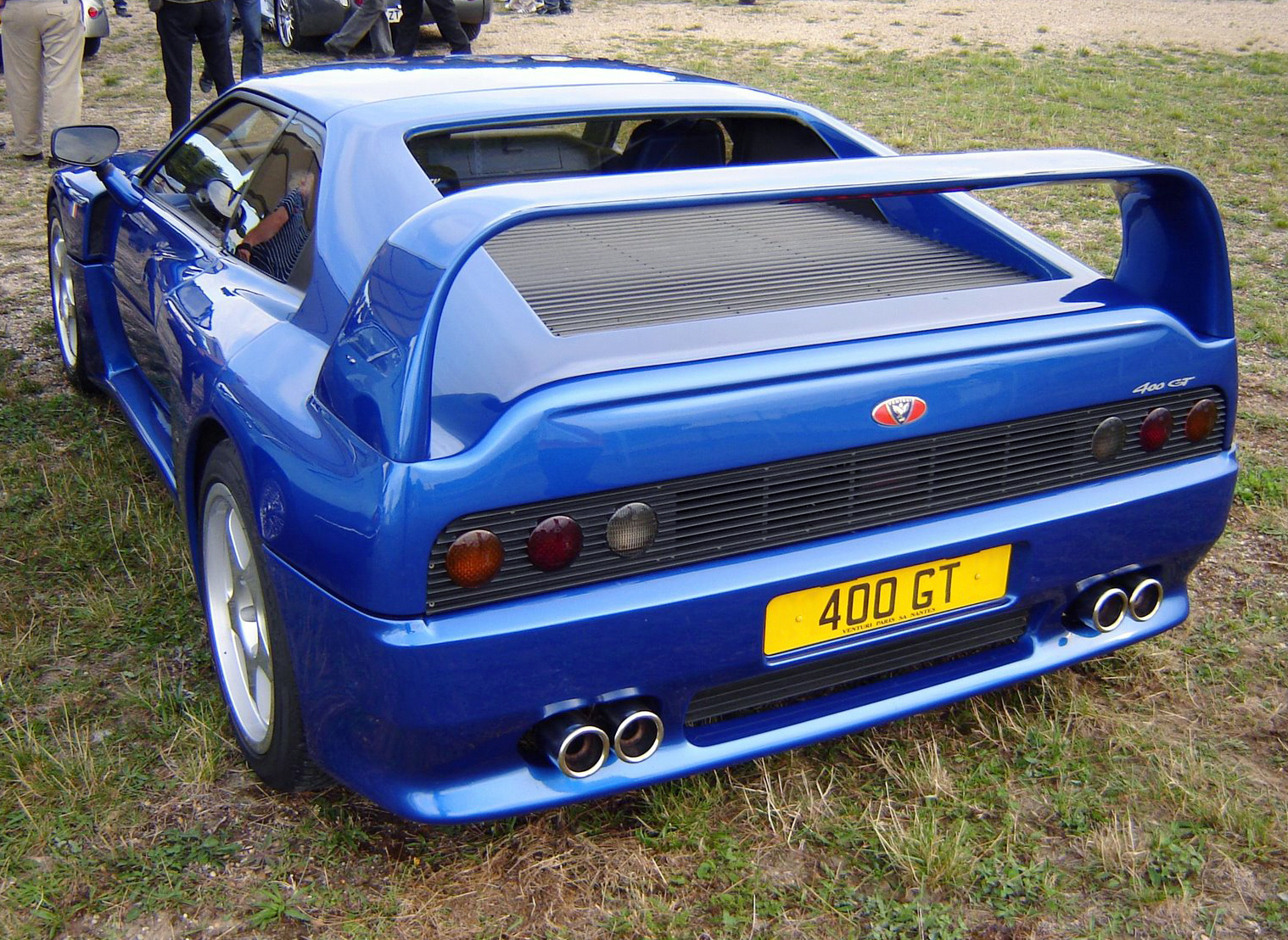
Venturi 400 GT rear view

The Venturi 400 GT remains one of the highest performing French cars ever produced, and was the first car in the world to have standard carbon brakes. True to that claim, the Atlantique 400 GT with a 2,975 cc (3.0 L; 181.5 cu in) DOHC 4 valves per cylinder twin-turbo V6 engine rated at 300 kW (408 PS; 402 hp) at 6000 rpm and 520 N⋅m (384 lb⋅ft) at 4500 rpm of torque with a compression ratio of 7.3:1, delivered excellent performance to put it on par with Ferraris of the early 90s. The 400 GT could hit 100 km/h (62 mph) in 4.7 seconds and 291 km/h (181 mph) top speed, while the Atlantique 300 Biturbo with a 310 PS (306 bhp; 228 kW) V6 could accelerate from 0-100 km/h (62 mph) in 4.7 seconds and could reach a top speed of 275 km/h (171 mph).

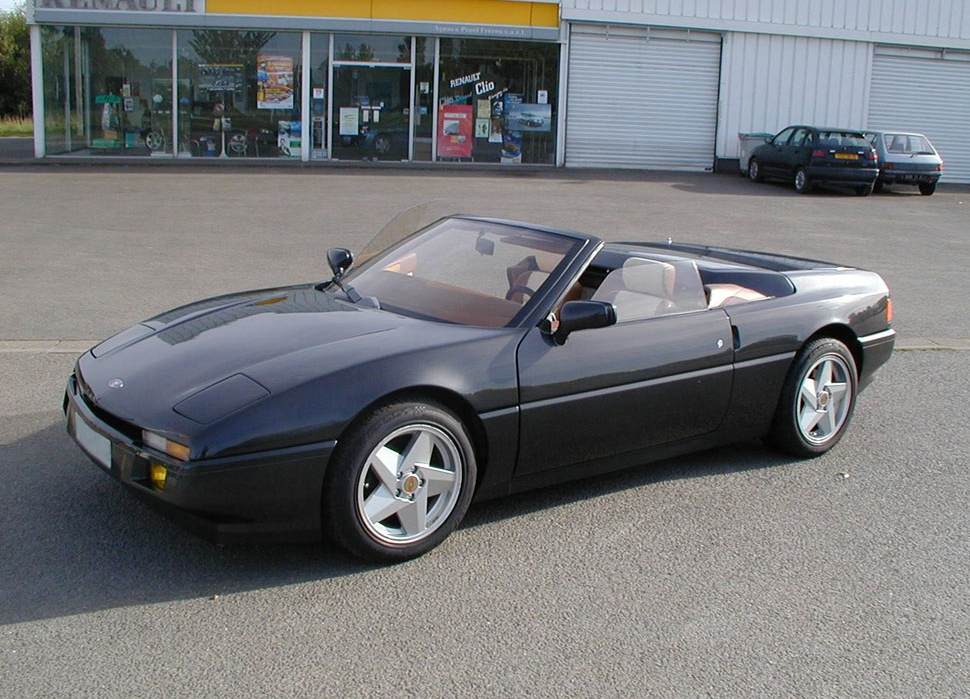
Venturi Transcup 210

A limited-edition 400 GTR was built to satisfy the homologation requirements to compete in 24 Hours of Le Mans. High-level competition has also brought fame to the brand. Stéphane Ratel, who would later found the FIA GT Championship, was at the origin of the Venturi Gentlemen Drivers Trophy. A total of 72 cars were manufactured and the customers were offered the possibility of converting the cars to road specification at the end of the season. These cars were driven by a total of 75 drivers. Venturi also won fame through its brilliant performances in the 24 Hours of Le Mans, particularly in 1993 with Christophe Dechavanne and Jacques Laffite with the Venturi Jacadi team, and in 1995 with Paul Belmondo racing on the 600 SLM.

However, it was in the BPR Global GT Series races that Venturi established its pedigree defeating Porsche and Ferrari on several occasions. In 1994 in Dijon-Prenois at the 4 Hours of Dijon, with Michel Ferté and Michel Neugarten on the 600 LM Jacadi, at the 1000 km of Paris with Henri Pescarolo and Jean-Claude Basso on the 600 LM, and the 4 Hours Spa, with Ferté and Neugarten. In 1995, it won again the 1000 km of Paris in the GT1 class.

=== From 2000 to the present day ===
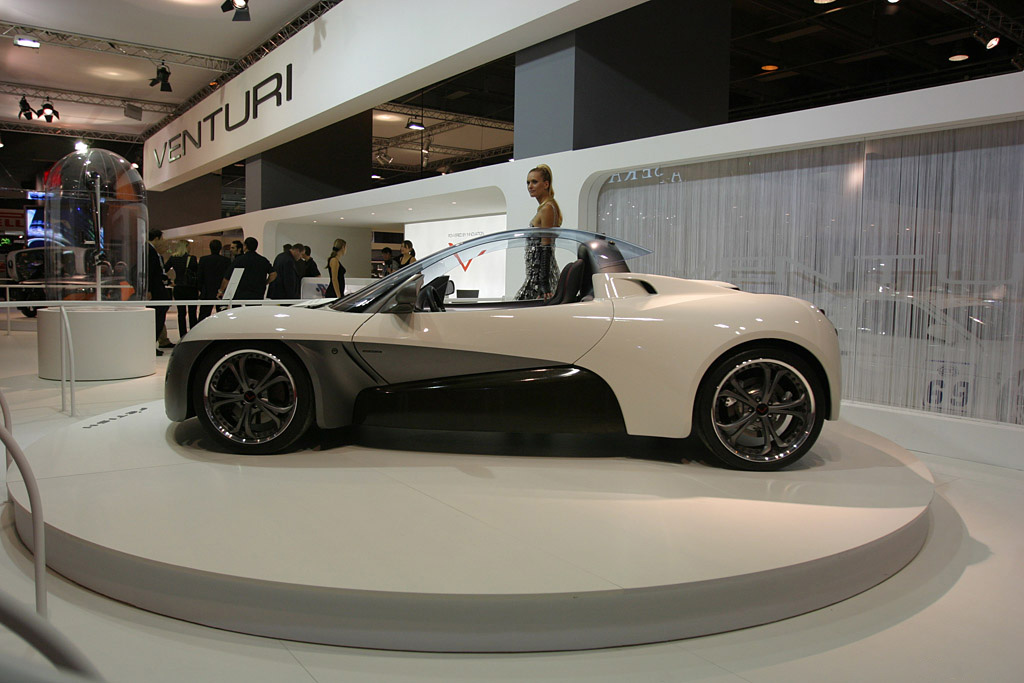
Venturi Fétish at the 2006 Paris Motor Show

In 2000, Gildo Pallanca Pastor bought Venturi and decided to focus on electric-powered vehicles. This led to the creation of the Fétish model, and involvement in a series of technology demonstration 'missions'.

In December 2009, Venturi announced its acquisition of French motorcycle manufacturer Voxan, allowing the firm to enter the motorcycle market.

=== Mission 01: Jamais contente ===
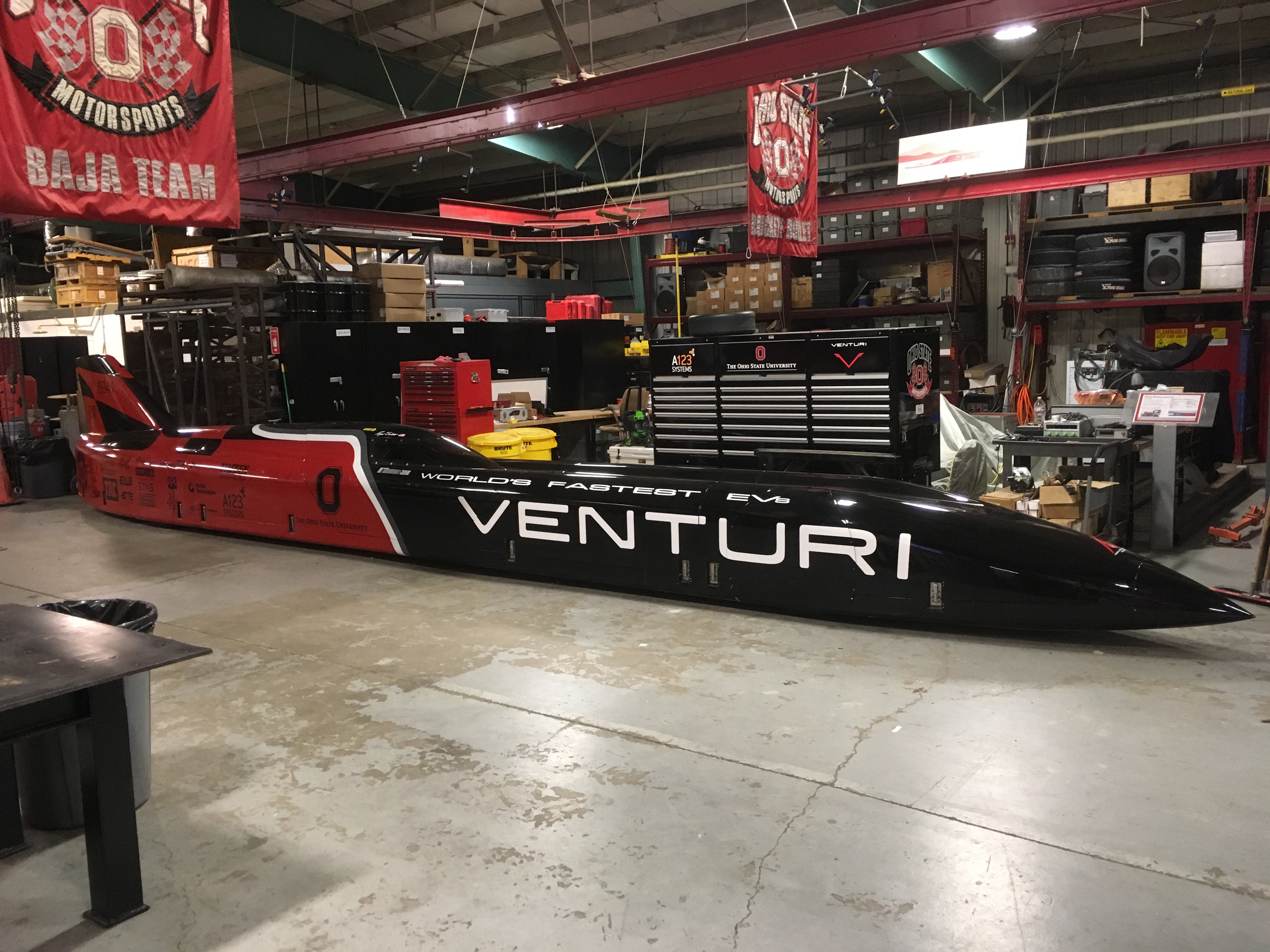
VBB-3

Mission 01: Jamais Contente is a program launched in 2009 in partnership with the Ohio State University's Center for Automotive Research (CAR). It aims to set electric vehicle speed records on the Bonneville Salt Flats in Utah. The Venturi Buckeye Bullet is the heir to the Jamais Contente, the first ever automobile to break the symbolic 100 km/h mark in 1899. This torpedo-shaped electric car, piloted by Camille Jenatzy, reached 105 km/h, setting a world record for any method of propulsion (steam or petrol)

The VBB-2, a hydrogen fuel cell-powered version, broke the 487 km/h (303 mph) mark in 2009. The following year, the VBB-2.5, an upgraded version with an electric battery pack, achieved an average speed of 495 km/h (308 mph). Finally, in 2016, the VBB-3 – the most advanced electric version of the vehicle with 2,200 kW (3,000 HP) of power – set a new FIA-certified world record of 549 km/h (341 mph) that still stands today.

=== Mission 02: Shanghai to Paris ===
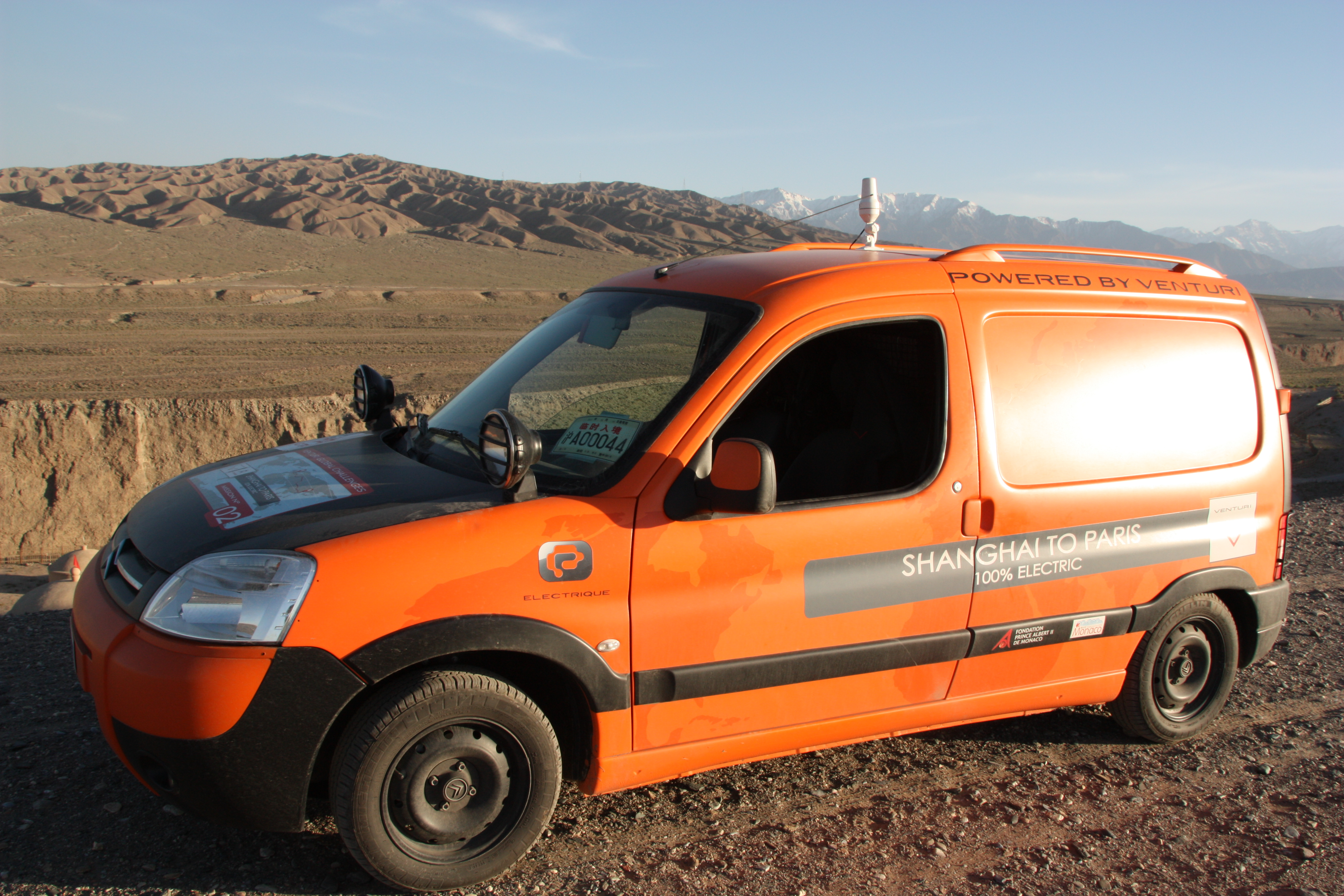
Mission 02: Citroën Berlingo "Powered by Venturi"

Mission 02 is an electric car journey reminiscent of Citroën's Croisière Jaune (Yellow Expedition), one of the first rally raids of the 20th century. Departing from Shanghai on May 3, 2010, the expedition covered 14,900 km, crossing China, Kazakhstan, Russia, Ukraine, Poland, the Czech Republic and Germany, finally arriving in Paris on July 13. To date, this is the longest distance covered by an unassisted electric vehicle. This performance was accomplished by Xavier Chevrin and Géraldine Gabin. The vehicle used was an electric Citroën Berlingo "Powered by Venturi". Two battery packs were added in order to increase its range to 500 km.

=== Mission 03: Back To Telegraph Creek ===
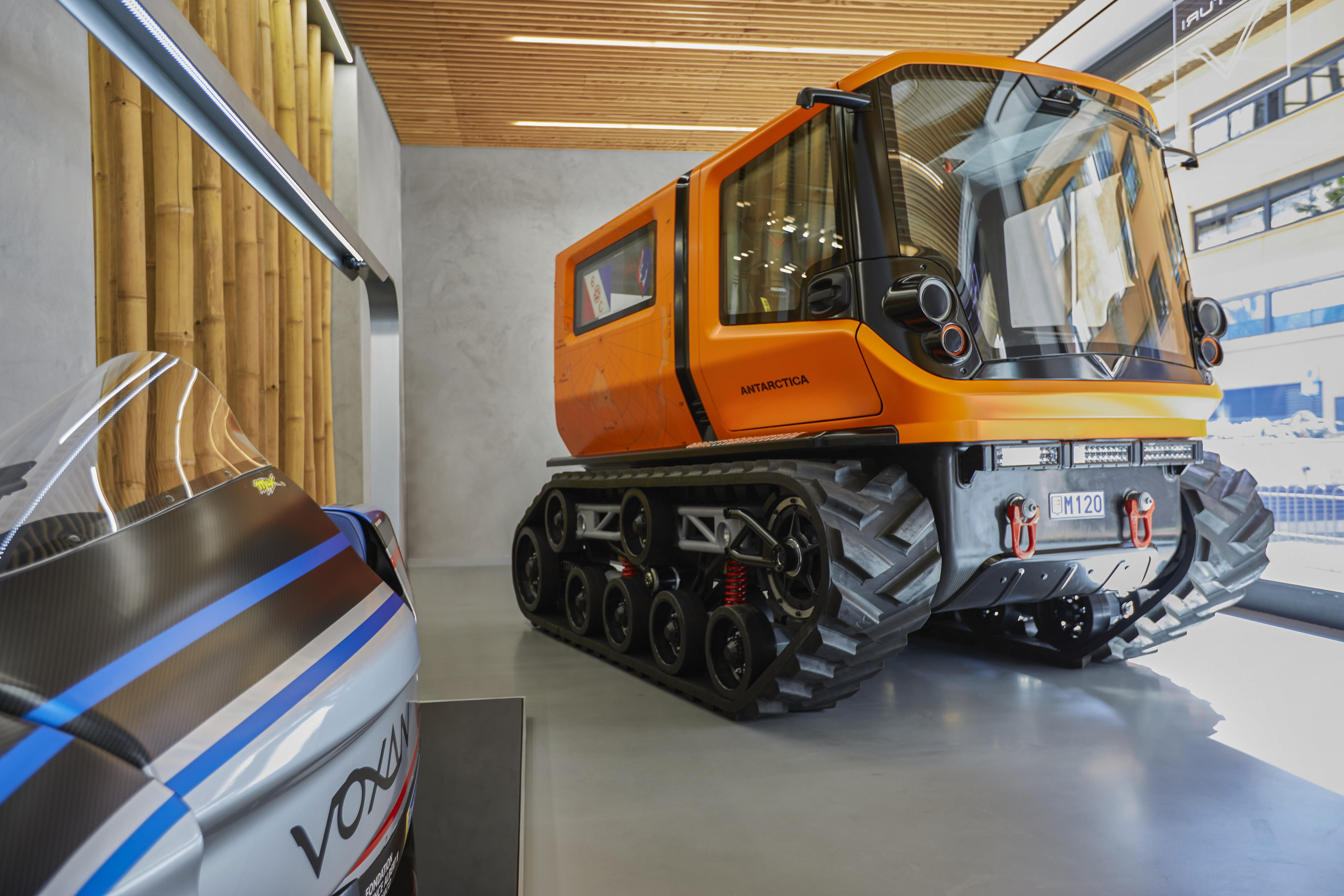
The Antarctica vehicle in the Venturi showroom in Monaco

Venturi has completed its own zero-emissions version of Citroën's historic Croisière Blanche expedition (also called the Bedeaux expedition), a 20th-century automobile raid that entailed crossing the Canadian North-West. That historic expedition ended in failure, owing to the nature of the terrain and the disastrous climatic conditions.

On 6 March 2019 in British Columbia (Canada), the Venturi Antarctica travelled 42 km in extreme temperatures as low as -30 °C. The aim of the expedition was to put the machine through a battery of tests in climatic conditions similar to those at the South Pole.

In June 2021, Venturi unveiled the next generation Antarctica which will be deployed at Princess Elisabeth Antarctic research station in December. The vehicle is 3.4 meters long, 2.18 meters high and weighs 2.5 tons. The battery has a capacity of 52.6 kWh allowing an autonomy of 50 kilometers, while the two axial flow motors are capable of developing 60 kW each. Recharging takes from 2 to 18 hours, depending on the context and the weather. With its fold-down bench seat, the vehicle is able to carry up to six people, along with equipment and a second battery to extend the initial range of 50 km.

=== Mission 04: Kilimanjaro to Okavango ===
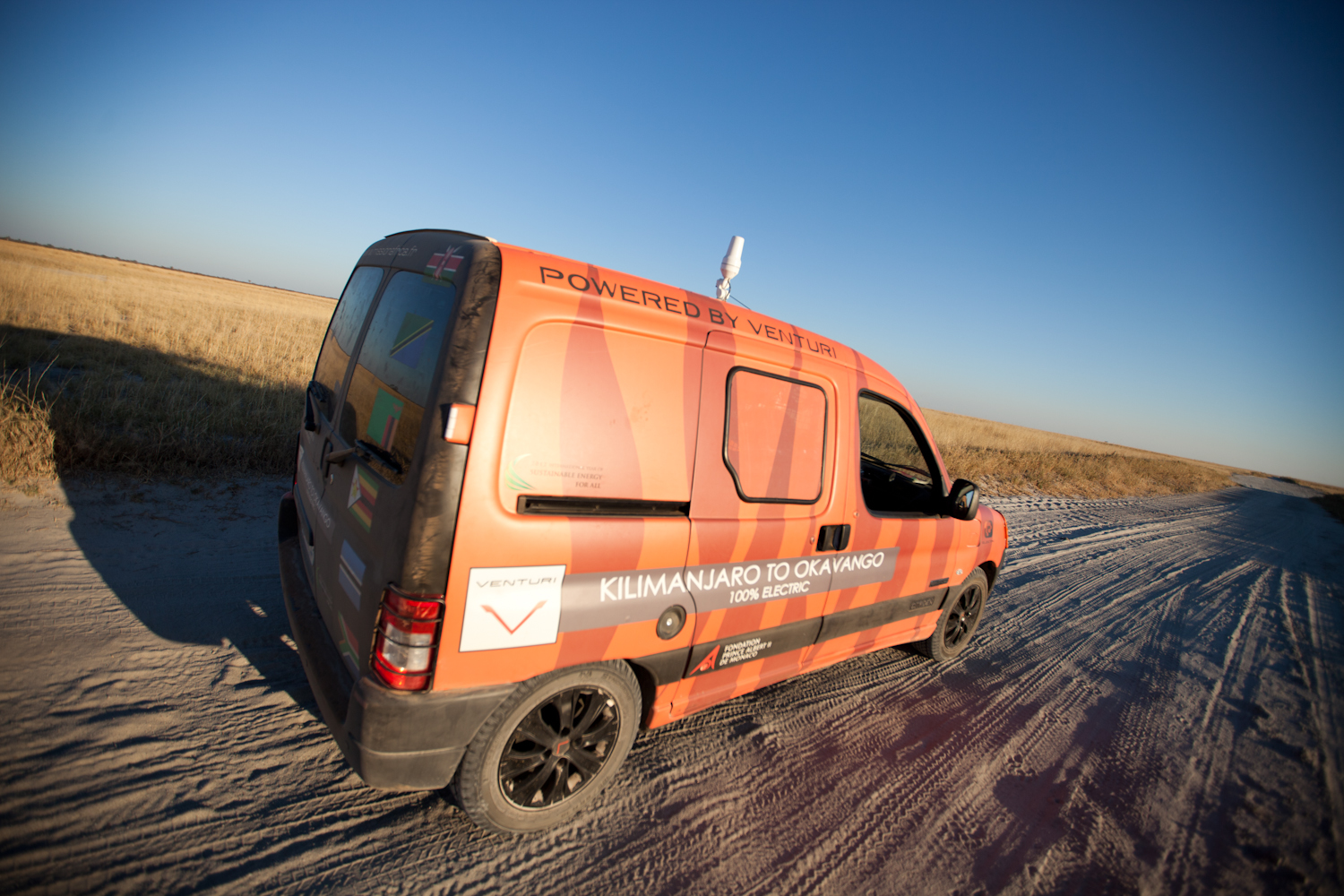
Venturi Global Challenges, Mission 04

Mission 04 is a modern-day version of the “Croisière Noire” (Black Cruise), a 1924 automobile expedition that crossed the African continent from north to south. This expedition was the first crossing of Africa by an electric vehicle without assistance. This time, Xavier Chevrin drove alone but the car remained unchanged (see mission 2). Setting out from Nairobi on 11 May 2012, he covered a distance of 5,800 km unassisted, reaching Johannesburg a month later.

=== Mission 05: Kennedy Space Center ===
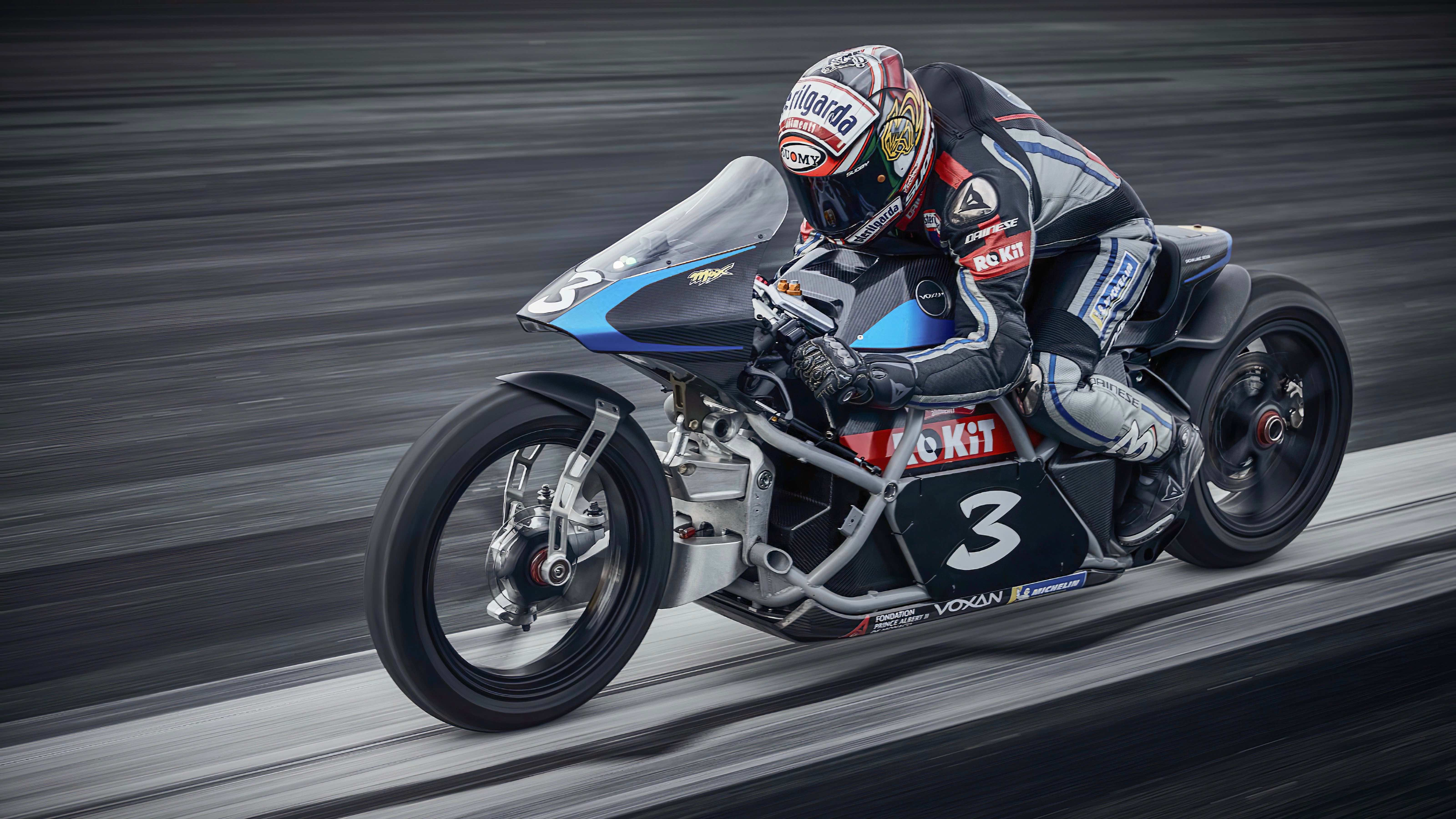
Max Biaggi on the Voxan Wattman (non-streamlined)

In December 2021, the Voxan Wattman, driven by Max Biaggi, set 21 new world speed records for an electric motorcycle.

=== Mission 06: International Polar Foundation ===
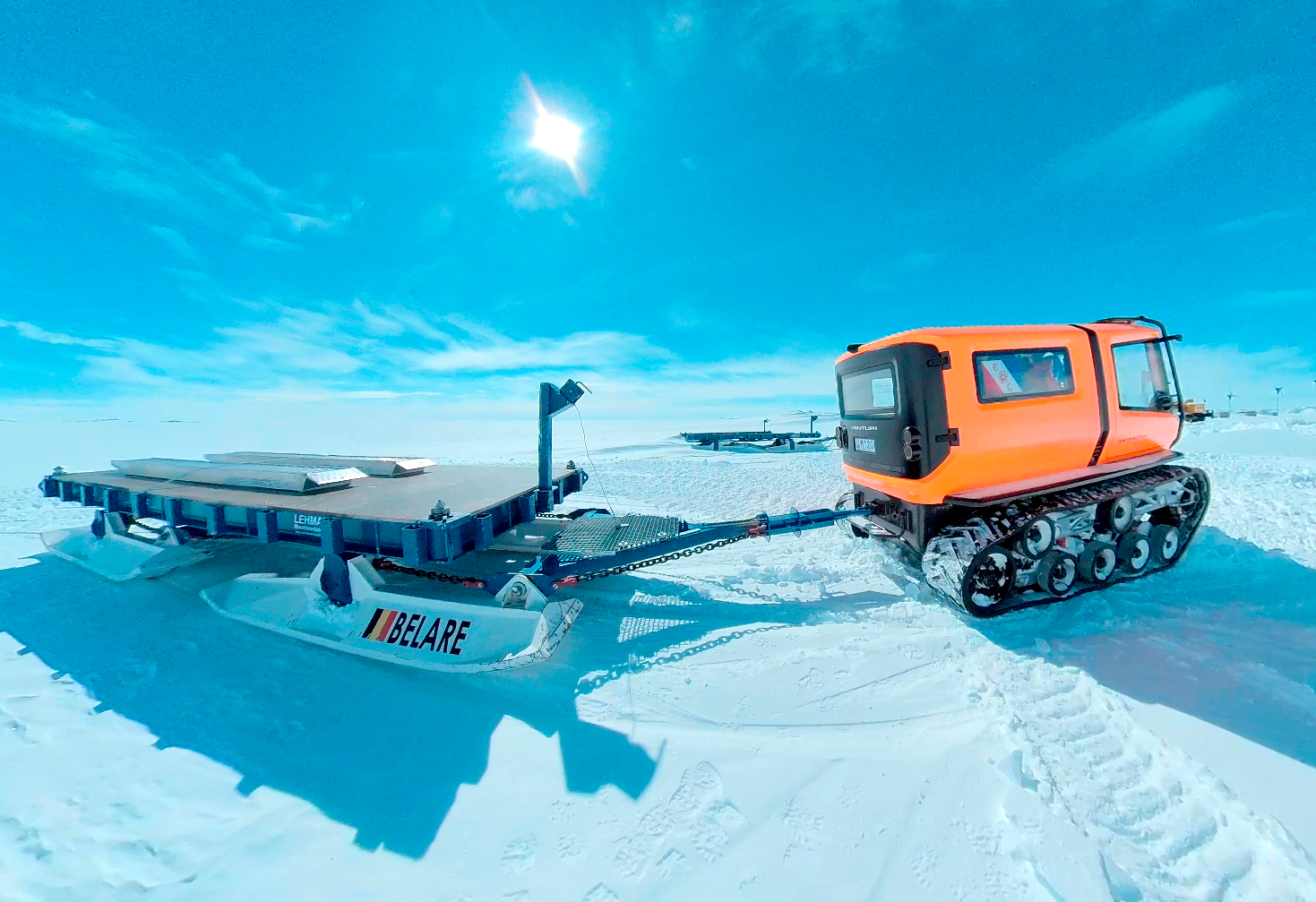
Venturi Antarctica near Princess Elisabeth Antarctica research station in December 2021.

Returning from a trip to the Antarctic in 2009, H.S.H. Prince Albert II of Monaco remarked to Venturi's President Gildo Pastor that the research stations there had no environmentally-friendly, non-polluting vehicles. So the Prince Albert II Foundation asked Venturi to come up with a zero emission solution, to carry passengers and equipment to and from the scientific research sites. At the time in 2009, the technology for driving on uneven terrain at temperatures of -50°C did not exist.

In 2019, following the 2010 experimental version, a second version of Antarctica has been tested in Canada (see mission 3 above).

The third version of Antarctica was fully optimized on 10 December 2021, when Gildo Pastor and his teams delivered the vehicle to the International Polar Foundation, at the Princess Elisabeth Antarctica research station (see mission 3 above for more informations regarding the vehicle).

=== Mission 07: Spitzberg ===
As part of the celebrations and commemorations of the centenary of Prince Albert I, Gildo Pastor, Chairman of Venturi, to pay tribute to the great-great-grandfather of Prince Albert II, entrusted eco-explorer Xavier Chevrin with a mission on the island of Spitsbergen, in the Norwegian archipelago of Svalbard. For 21 days in June 2022, the Venturi adventurer covered 234 kilometres on cross-country skis, in temperatures as low as -15°C.

== Motorsport ==
=== Formula E ===
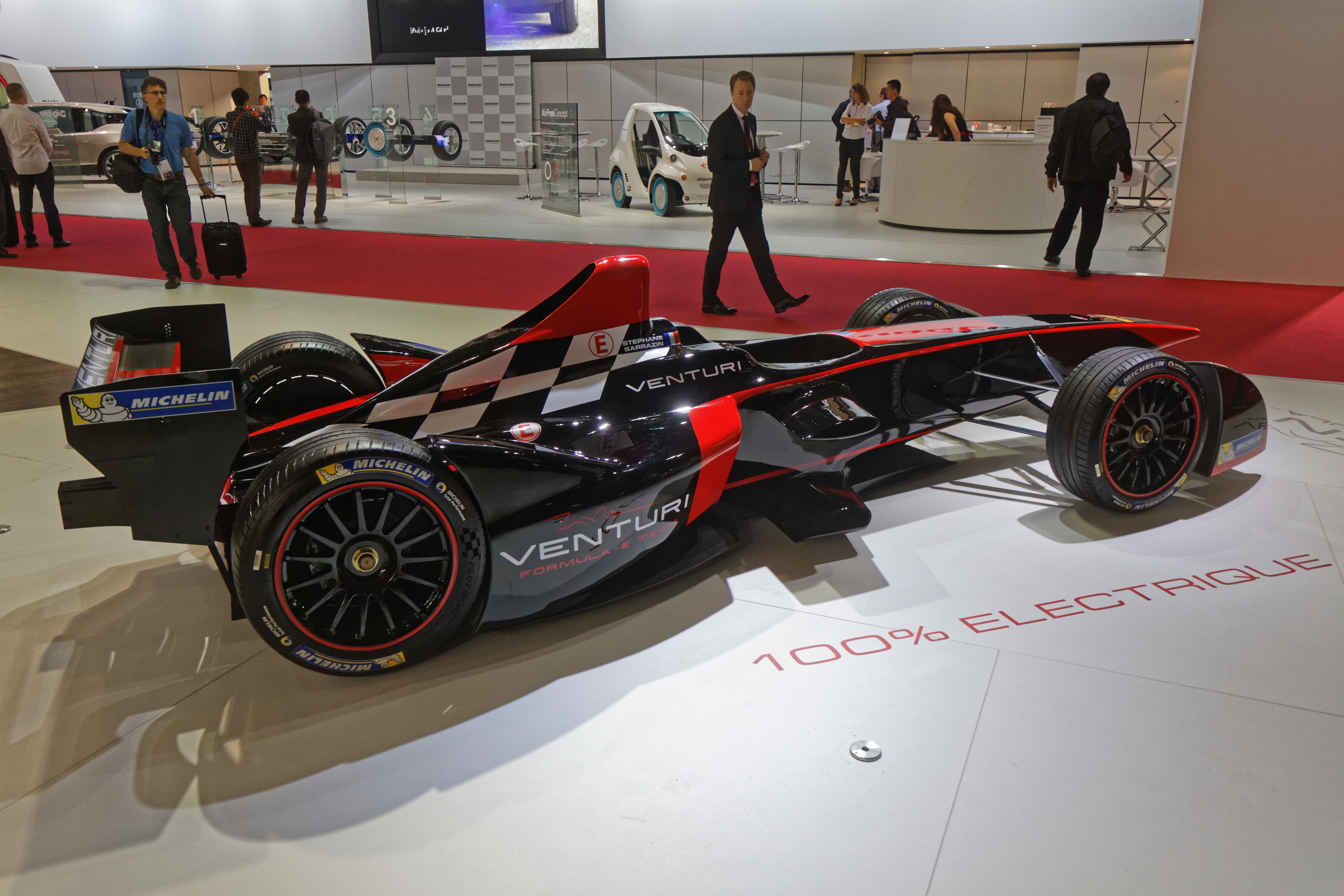
2014 Venturi Formula E car

Venturi was the first manufacturer to join the Formula E world championship. Created in 2013, Venturi has been present on the grid since the championship's inaugural race in 2014.

In 2015, Venturi became an FIA-approved manufacturer in Formula E, supplying full powertrain systems to Dragon Racing (2015–2016) and Mercedes-backed privateer team HWA Racelab (2018–2019).

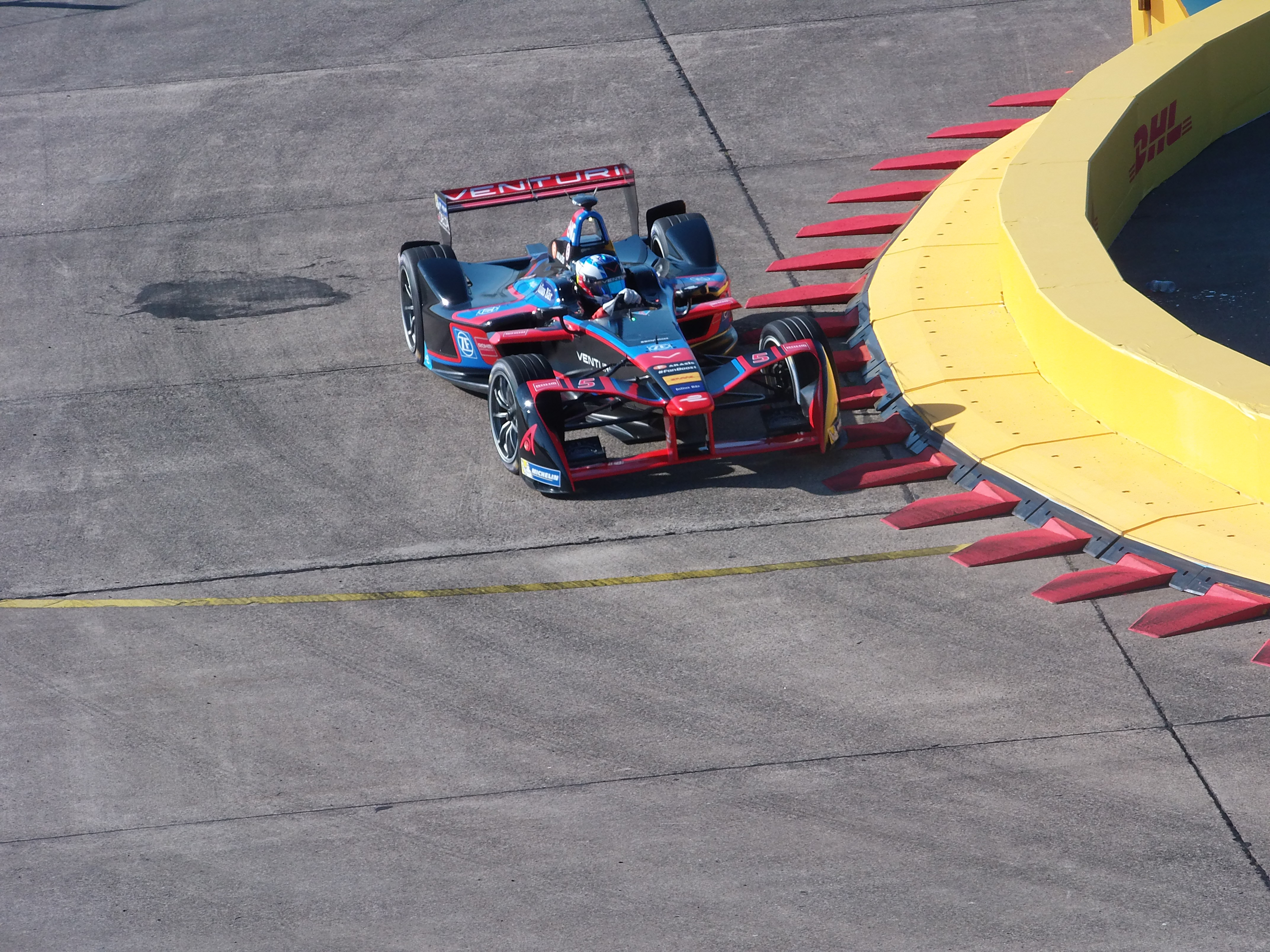
Maro Engel driving at the 2017 Berlin E-Prix

In May 2018, the team signed a three-year deal with eleven time Formula One race winner Felipe Massa and rehired seven time Macau World Cup winner Edoardo Mortara as teammate to Massa. Susie Wolff became the team principal in June 2018. At Formula E's landmark 50th race at the 2019 Hong Kong ePrix, Mortara recorded Venturi's maiden victory. Venturi took further podiums at the Mexico City E-Prix and Monaco E-Prix which was also the site of Massa's first podium finish in Formula E. With 88 points, the team took eighth in the championship. Mortara finished 14th in the Drivers' Standings with 52 points while Massa was 15th with 36 points.

In October 2019, Venturi confirmed that Mortara would again partner Massa while the team entered a powertrain partnership with Mercedes-Benz. On the eve of the 2019-20 season opener, the team announced a three-year Title Partnership with global telecommunications company ROKiT, and also confirmed the retention of Norman Nato as Reserve Driver and the appointment of Arthur Leclerc, brother of Ferrari Formula One driver Charles Leclerc, as Test Driver. Mortara took 14th in the Drivers' Championship with 41 points while Massa was 22nd with 3 points. Venturi finished in 10th in the Teams' Standings with 44 points. At the final race of the season, it was announced that Massa would be retiring from Formula E.

For Formula E's seventh season and first as a World Championship, Venturi re-signed Mortara and promoted Norman Nato to a full-time race seat, with the Frenchman replacing Massa. Jake Hughes, in turn, joined the team as Reserve Driver. Jérôme d'Ambrosio was appointed as Deputy Team Principal after deciding to retire from professional competition at the end of Season 6.

In December 2020, Venturi announced a take over in ownership, with a US investor group led by Scott Swid and Jose M Aznar Botella purchasing the team. Susie Wolff remained as Team Principal and retained an interest in Venturi alongside Founder Gildo Pallanca Pastor.

After eight seasons on the Formula E grid, it was announced that Venturi Racing would be renamed to MSG Racing for the 2023 season. The team announced a Title and Powertrain Partnership with Maserati in April 2022, after the luxury automotive manufacturer announced it would join Formula E for Season 9 in January 2022.

=== Formula One ===
(key) (results in bold indicate pole position)

Year	Chassis	Engine(s)	Tyres	Drivers	1	2	3	4	5	6	7	8	9	10	11	12	13	14	15	16	Points	WCC
1992	LC92	Lamborghini 3512 3.5 V12	**G**		RSA	MEX	BRA	ESP	SMR	MON	CAN	FRA	GBR	GER	HUN	BEL	ITA	POR	JPN	AUS	1	11th
1992	LC92	Lamborghini 3512 3.5 V12	**G**	(France) Bertrand Gachot	Ret	11	Ret	Ret	Ret	6	DSQ	Ret	Ret	14	Ret	18	Ret	Ret	Ret	Ret	1	11th
1992	LC92	Lamborghini 3512 3.5 V12	**G**	(Japan) Ukyo Katayama	12	12	9	DNQ	Ret	DNPQ	Ret	Ret	Ret	Ret	Ret	17	9	Ret	11	Ret	1	11th

== List of models ==
Venturi 300 Atlantique

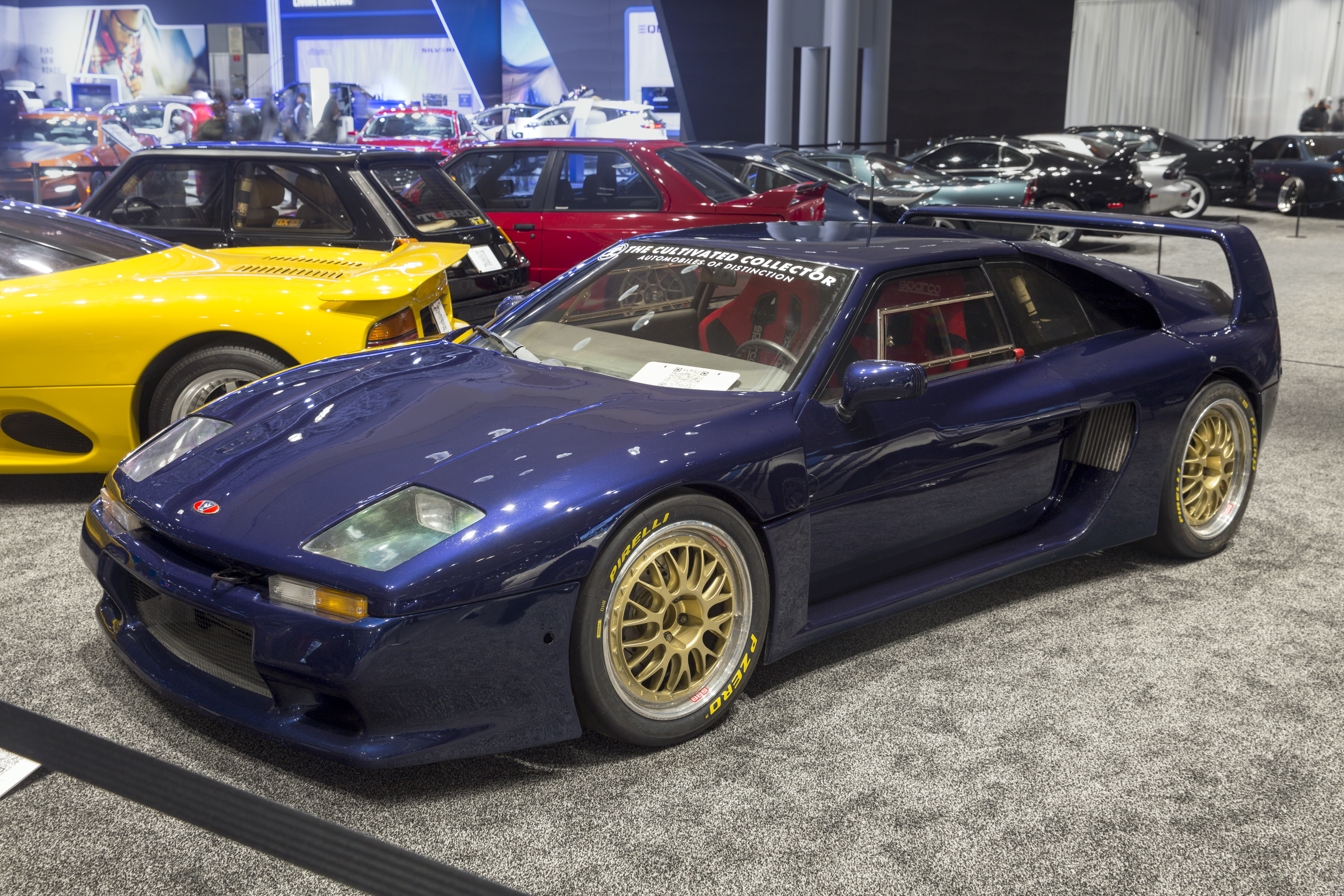
Venturi 400 Trophy

- MVS Venturi (includes Coupé and Cabriolet versions) 1987-1990 – Coupé 160 automatic, Transcup, Transcup automatic (six built)
  - 1987-1990 – Coupé 200, Transcup
  - 1991 – Coupé 210, Transcup
  - 1992 – Coupé 111 Cup (2-liter, four-cylinder export model, mainly for Italy)
  - 1989-1996 – Coupé 260, Transcup (sold as the MVS 2.80 in 1989)
  - 1991 – 260 Atlantique
  - 1994-1996 – 260 LM
  - Trophy - 73 built for racing, ten later converted for street use by the factory
- 1994-1997 – 400 GT (15 built, 13 series 1 and two series 2)
- Venturi Atlantique (rework of the MVS Venturi)
  - 1996-1998 – Atlantique 300
  - 1999-2000 – Atlantique 300 Biturbo
  - 1999 – Venturi 300 GTR
- 500 LM - a limited number (~7) were produced and raced at Le Mans, Jarama and Zolder in 1993
  - 600 LM - further racing cars were produced later in 1993 with the newer engine
  - 600 SLM - single example built in 1995, but other cars (originally 600 LM models) have been modified to similar specifications. Appeared at Suzuka, Japan, and Zhuhaï, China.

=== Electric cars ===
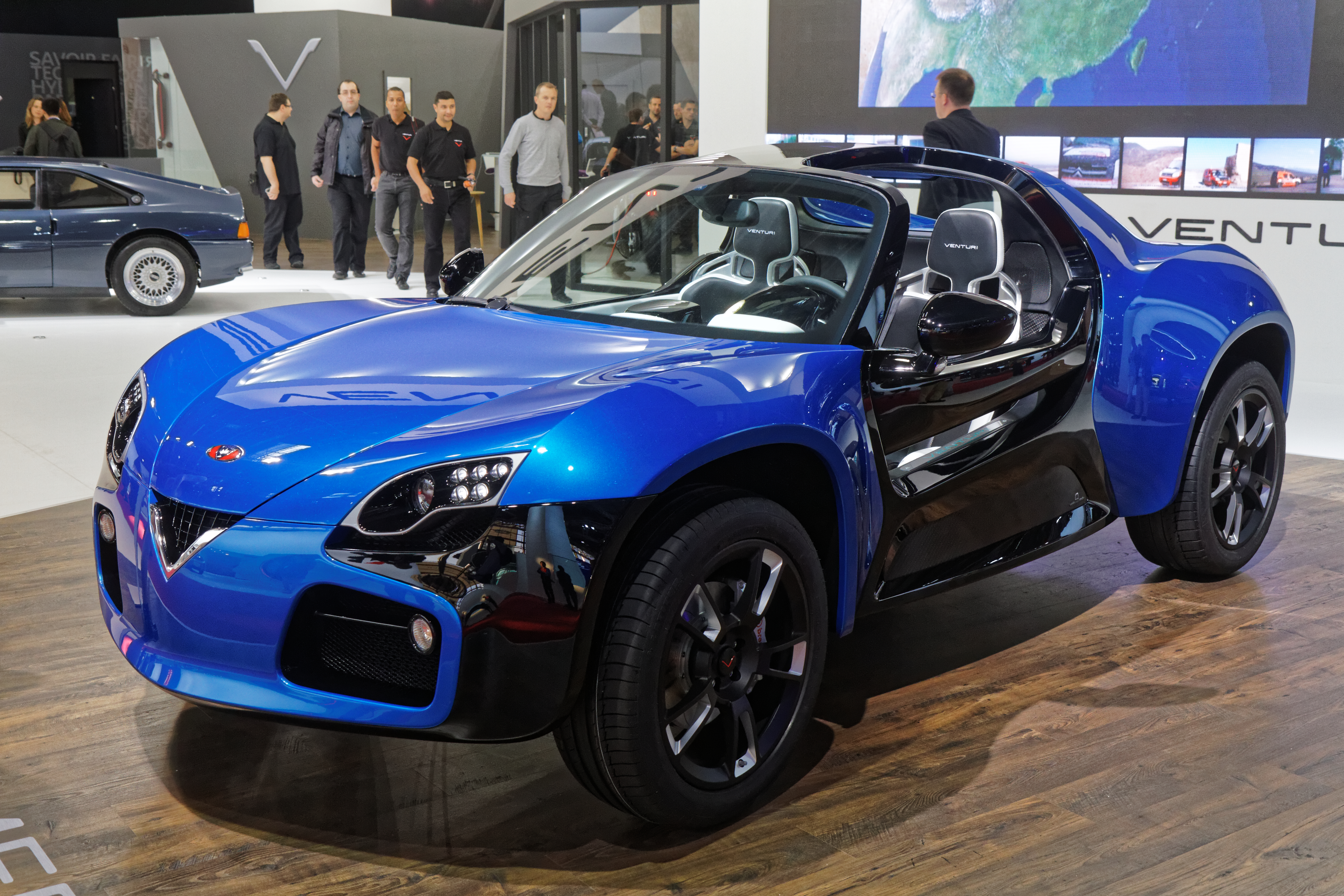
Venturi America

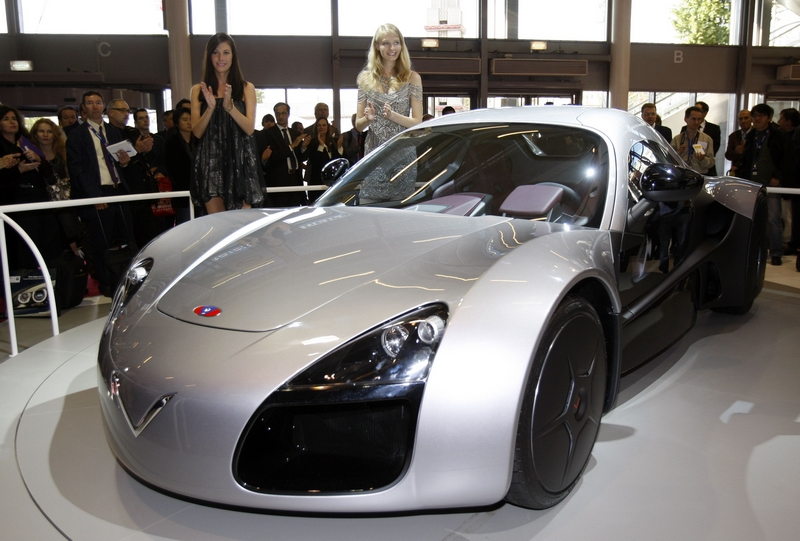
Venturi Volage

- Fétish, marketed as the first electric sports car in the world
- GT3 'Heritage', 2006
- Eclectic, marketed as the first autonomous urban vehicle in the world
- Astrolab, marketed as the first electric-solar hybrid vehicle in the world
- Volage (electric concept roadster car with 8 Active Wheel in-wheel motors from French tire giant Michelin)
- Eclectic 2.0, a more compact of the Eclectic
- Venturi Buckeye Bullet series of speed-record vehicles, in conjunction with a team Ohio State University
- Fétish II, the next generation of the Fétish
- America, electric crossover, announced at the Paris Motor Show 2010
