= Venturi 400 =

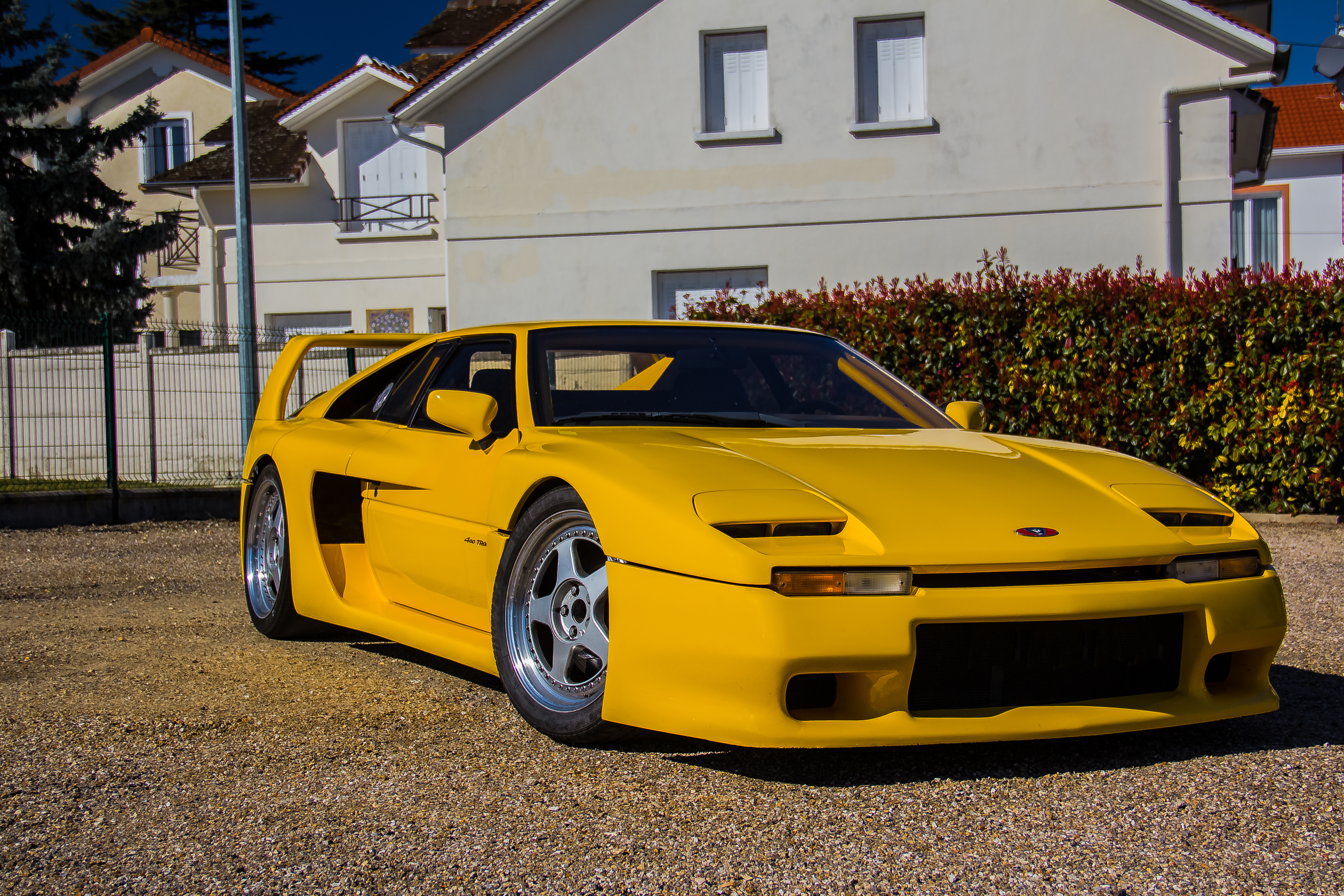

Overview
- Manufacturer: Venturi Automobiles
- Production: 1994-1997
- Assembly: Couëron, Pays de la Loire, France
- Designer: Claude Poiraud, Gérard Godfroy

Body and chassis
- Class: Sports car
- Body style: 2-door coupe
- Layout: mid-engine, rear-wheel drive

Powertrain
- Engine: 3.0L V6 N/A, turbo or biturbo
- Transmission: 5-speed manual transmission

The Venturi 400 GT is a sports car produced by the French car manufacturer Venturi. The coupe was produced from 1994 to 1997 with less than 100 units. Only about 15 street versions and 73 units for racing were built.

Due to its resemblance to the Ferrari F40, the 400 GT was often referred by automotive enthusiasts as "the French F40".

== 400 Trophy ==
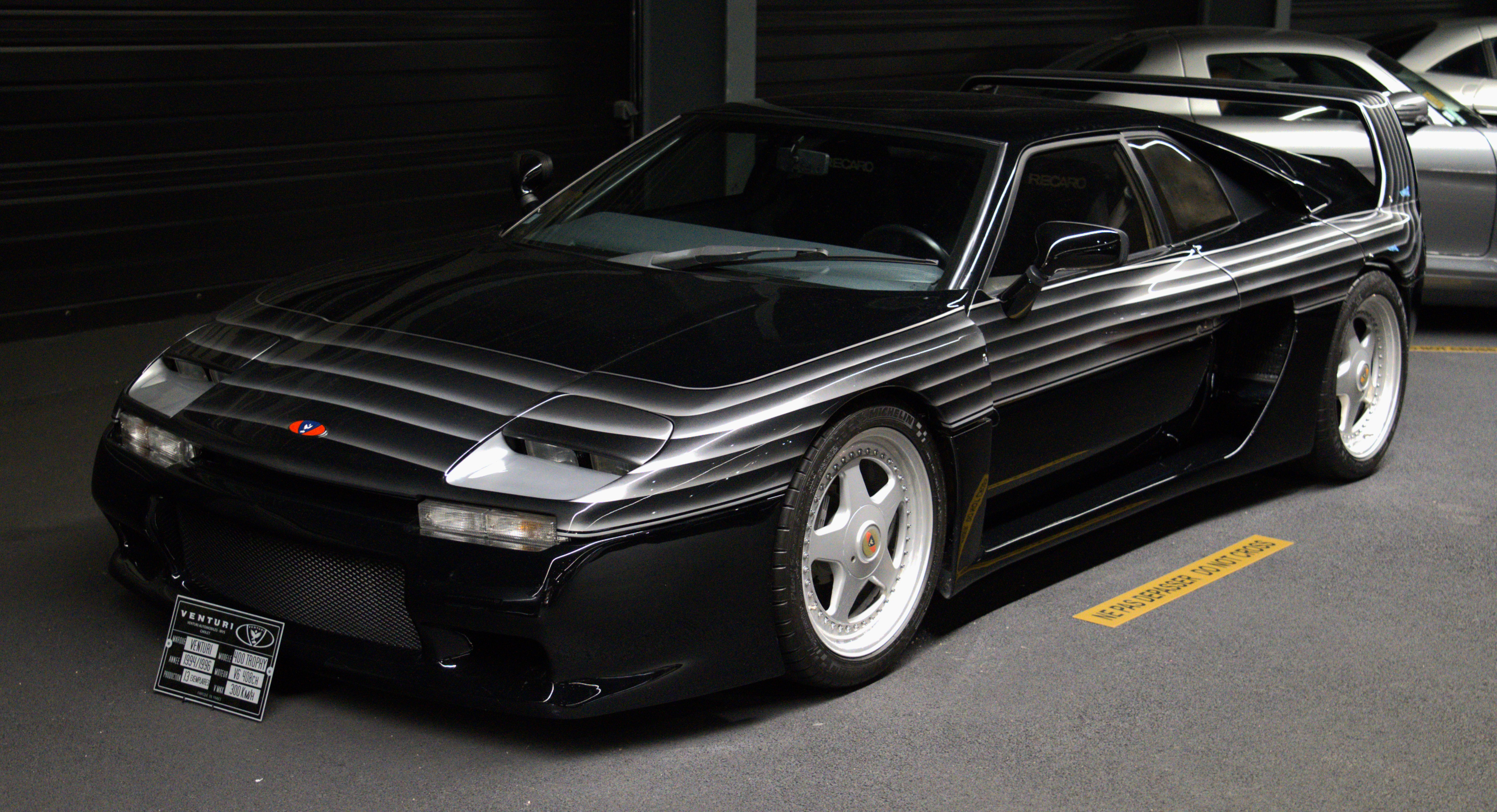
Venturi 400 Trophy

The Venturi 400 Trophy, also known only as Venturi Trophy is a competition car built in 1992 specifically to compete in tourism competitions. It was powered by a V6 biturbo engine with a 90 ° bore of 2975 cm³ of displacement. The biturbo, derived PRV / EIA engine, was capable of delivering 408 hp, with a torque of 530 Nm and acceleration from 0 to 100 km/h in 4.1 seconds.i Much of the development of the Venturi into a racing car was funded by Rocky Agusta.

Thanks to Stéphane Ratel, director of competition services for the French company, the Gentlemen Drivers Trophy was created, a championship created specifically to compete with the 400 Trophy (similar to what Porsche had done with Porsche Cup). The principle proposed by Ratel was simple, and was similarly resumed by other manufacturers (for example from Ferrari with FXX) in addition to selling the car, they were sold for little more of 100.00 Fr all the services necessary for participation in the competition. The cars had the same technical preparation, which guaranteed the same chances of winning for all the participants, beyond the financial possibilities of the same. The first edition of the trophy is a success, and the championship includes six races on as many circuits: Le Mans, Pau, Paul Ricard, Nürburgring, Magny-Cours and Dijon.

In total, the Gentlemen Drivers Trophy lasted for four seasons.

== 400 GT ==
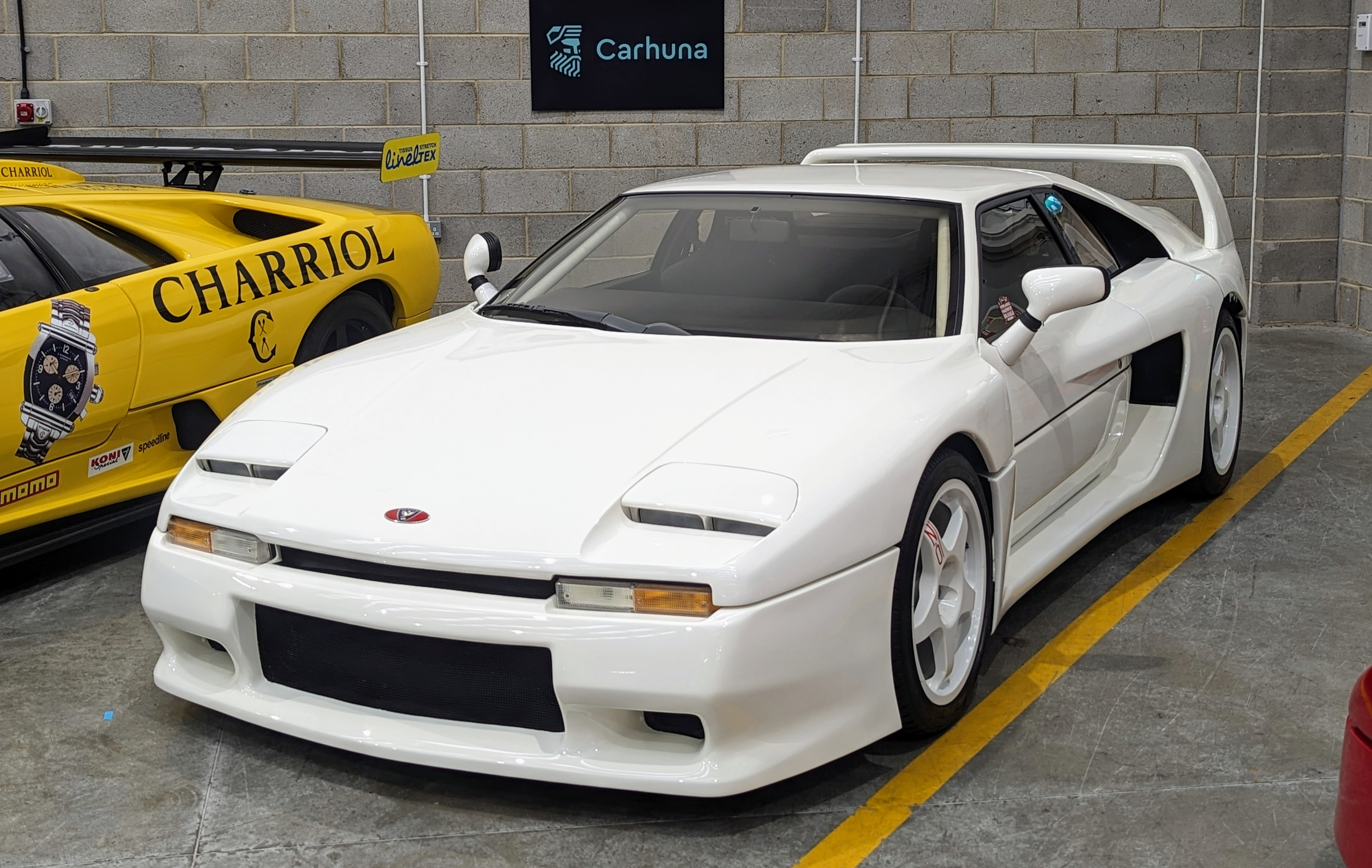
Venturi 400 GT

From the racing version came the Venturi 400 GT, a road model whose production was definitely much more limited. It was presented by the famous French racing driver Henri Pescarolo in 1994 at the company headquarters, at Couëron. The main differences consisted of a series of small changes aimed at road homologation, while the engine was the same as the race version, with a 5-speed manual gearbox and a top speed of 290 km/h. The passenger compartment, which was obviously of higher quality, was very different, taking up that of the Venturi 260. The 400 GT was fitted with a catalytic converter, as in the last versions of the 260.
