= Venturi Atlantique =

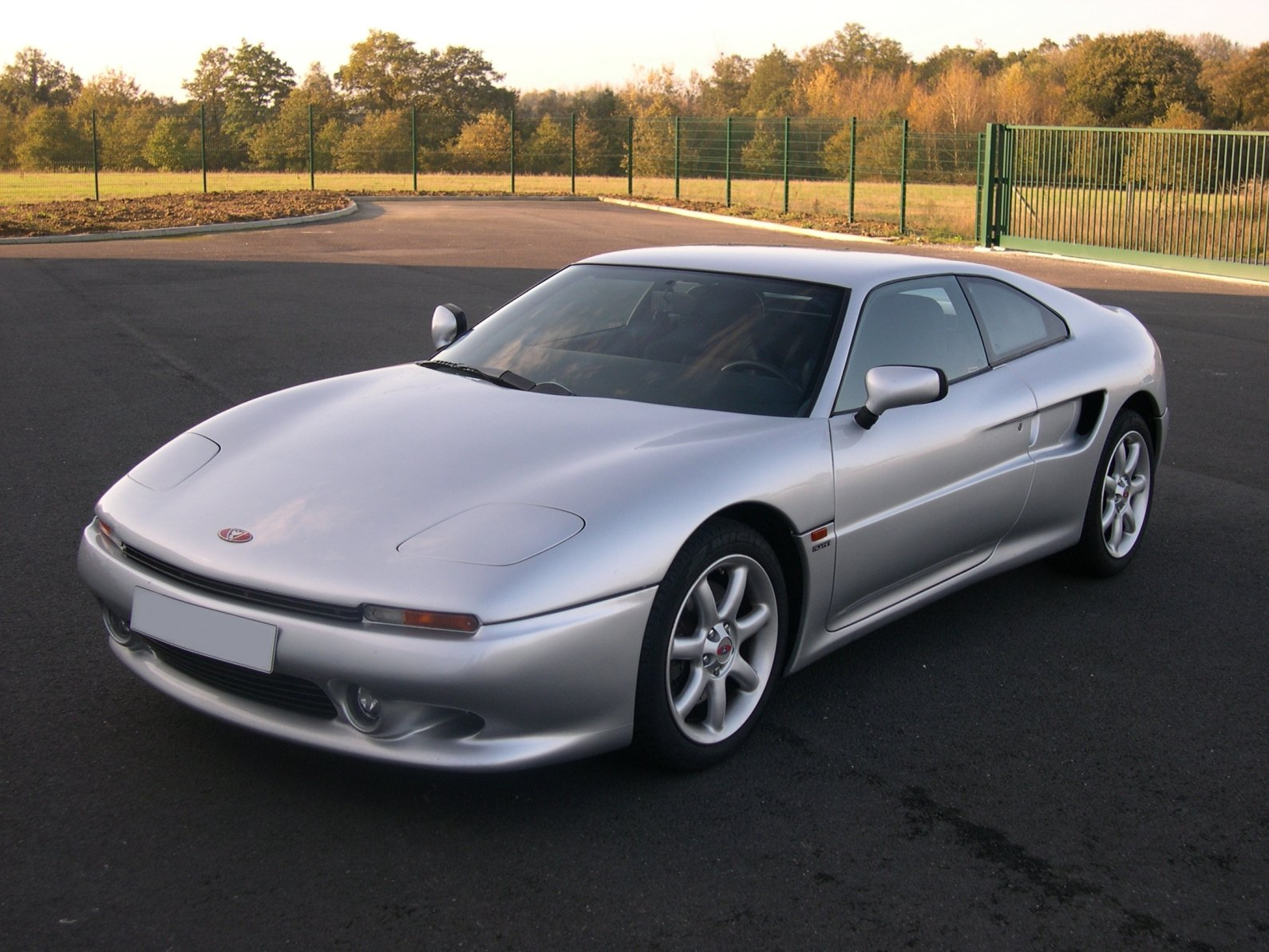
- Venturi 300 Atlantique

Overview
- Manufacturer: Venturi Automobiles
- Production: 1991-2000
- Assembly: Couëron, Pays de la Loire, France
- Designer: Claude Poiraud, Gérard Godfroy

Body and chassis
- Class: Sports car
- Body style: 2-door coupe
- Layout: mid-engine, rear-wheel drive

Powertrain
- Engine: 2849 cc PRV Z7W turbo V6; 2946 cc ESL L7X biturbo V6; 2975 cc PRV Z7X V6; 2975 cc PRV Z7X turbo V6
- Transmission: 5-speed manual transmission

Dimensions
- Wheelbase: 2,500 mm (98.4 in)
- Length: 4,242 mm (167.0 in)
- Width: 1,840 mm (72.4 in)
- Height: 1,180 mm (46.5 in)

The Venturi Atlantique was a mid-engined, fiberglass-bodied French sports car produced by Venturi Automobiles from 1991 to 2000.

== Atlantique 260 ==
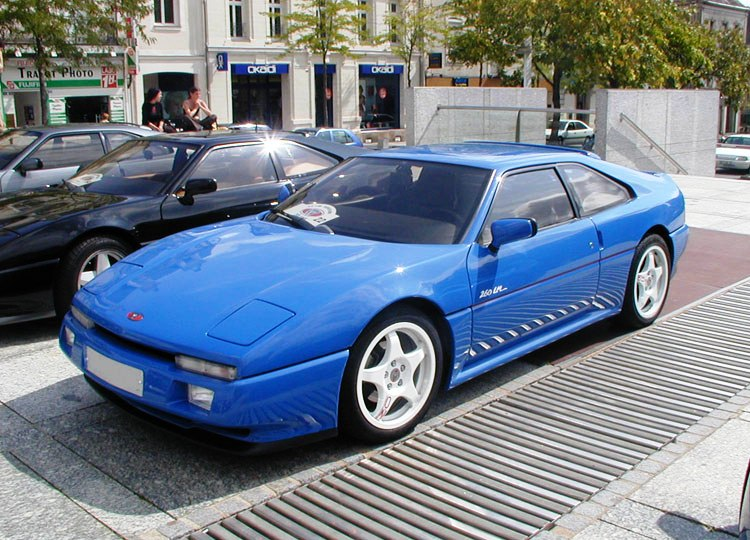
Venturi 260 Atlantique

The original 260 was a revised version of the Venturi APC 260, carrying over the 2.8-litre turbocharged V6 engine with 260 PS (191 kW; 256 hp), but with a reduced weight of 1,110 kg (2,450 lb). It could achieve a top speed of 167 mph (269 km/h) and accelerated from 0-60 mph (97 km/h) in 5.2 seconds.

== Atlantique 300 ==
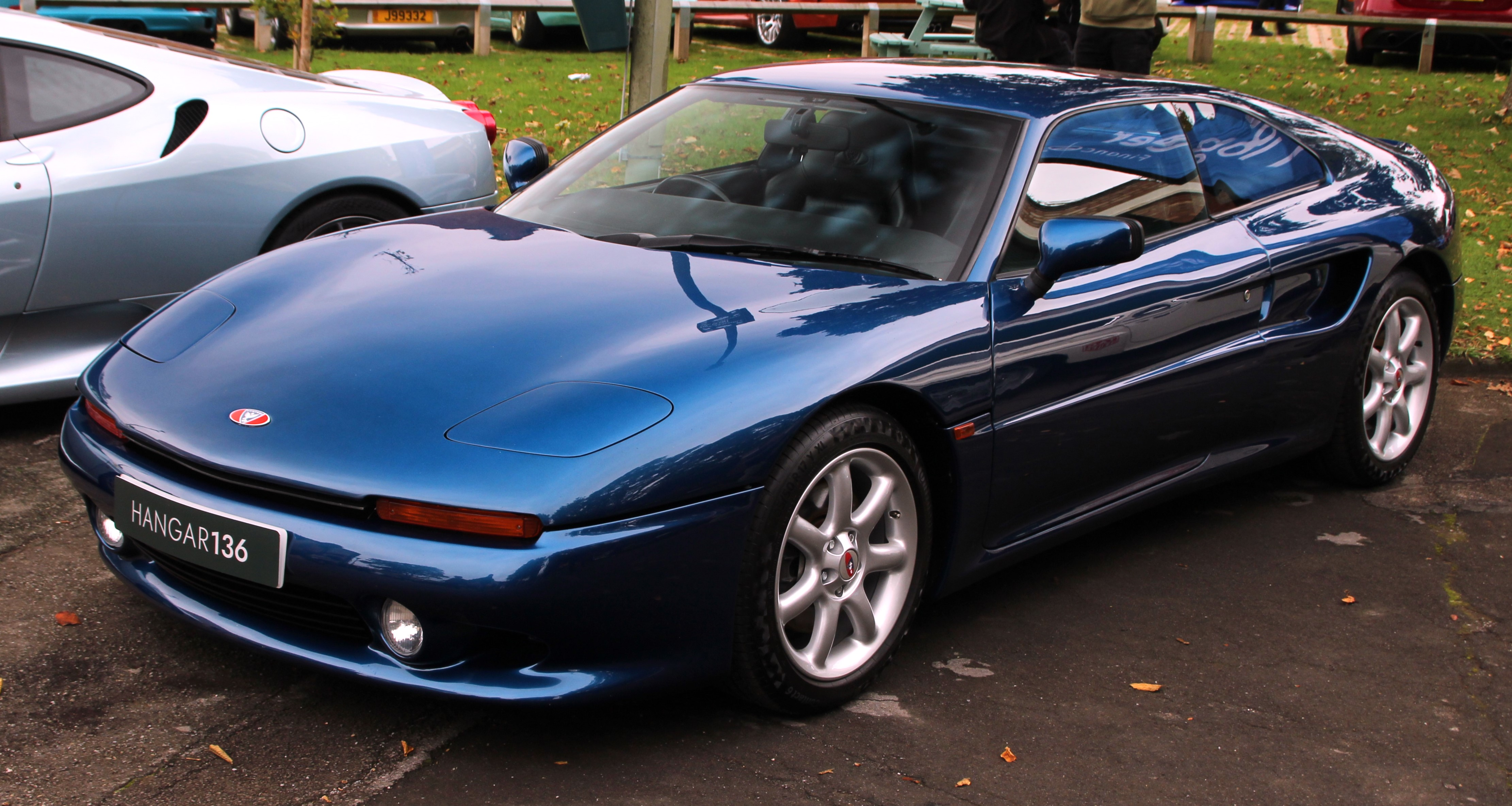
Venturi 300 Atlantique

Scotsman Hubert O'Neill purchased Venturi in 1994 and conceived of the Venturi 400GT as well as a revised Atlantique. After a rushed design time of six months, the new Atlantique 300 was unveiled at the Paris Motor Show. Its 3.0 V6 PRV engine was lifted from other Peugeot/Citroën models and could achieve 210 PS (154 kW; 207 hp) in naturally aspirated form or 281 PS (207 kW; 277 hp) with a turbocharger which was essentially the same engine as used in the Alpine A610.

Venturi again went into receivership in 1996, and was bought by Thai firm Nakarin Benz, under whom the company focused its concentration upon road cars.

== Atlantique 300 Biturbo ==
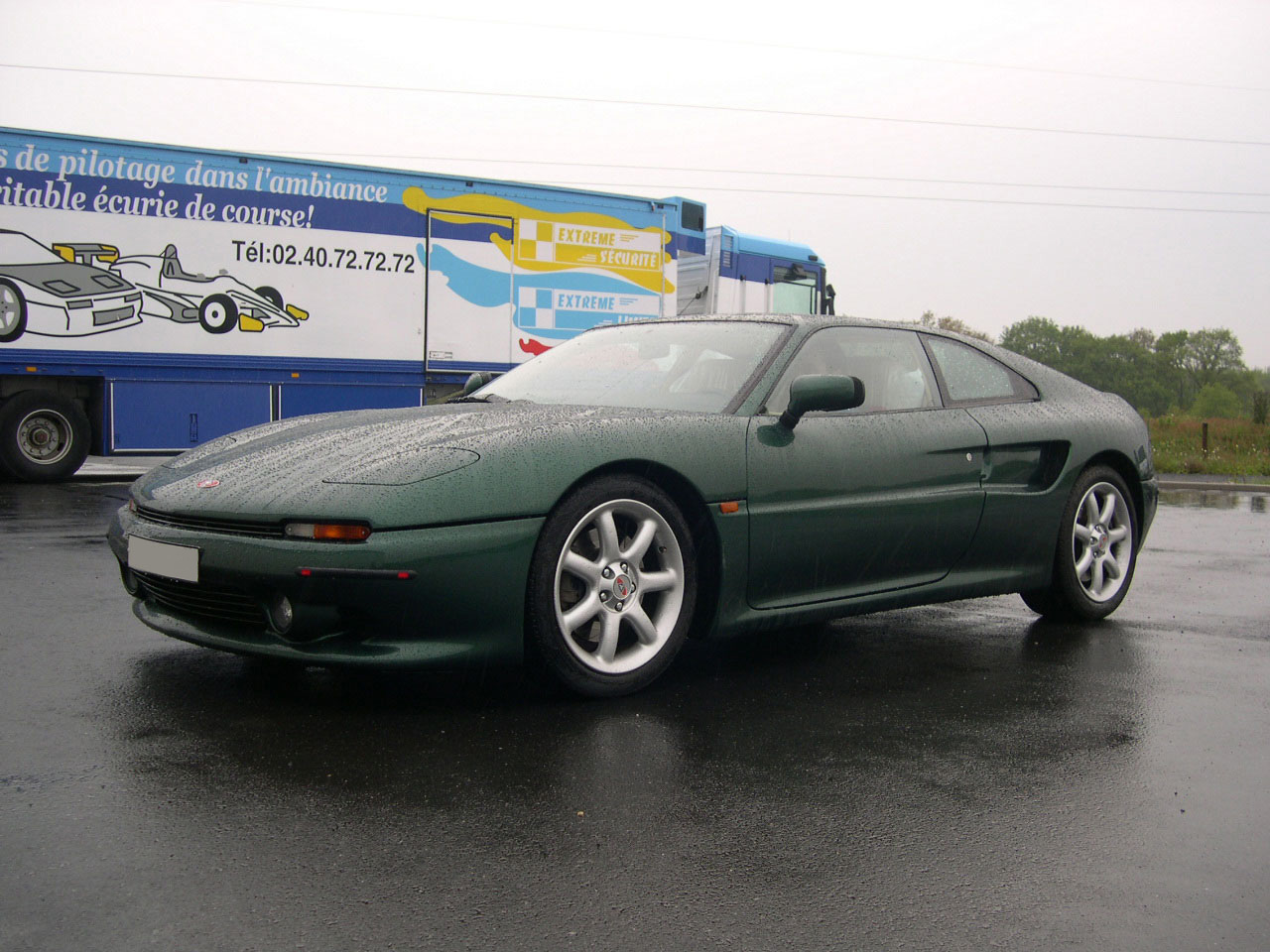
Venturi Atlantique 300 twin-turbo

The Twin-turbo version of the Atlantique 300 was released in 1998 and used the later L7X V6, a Renault variant of the V6 ESL engine which brought the power up to 310 PS (228 kW; 306 hp) at 6,200 rpm and 394 N⋅m (291 lb⋅ft) of torque at 3,800 rpm, with a top speed of 275 km/h (171 mph) and a 0-100 km/h (62 mph) time of 4.7 seconds, this addition made the Atlantique a serious performance competitor to the Lotus Esprit V8. 13 examples were built in 1999-2000; this model was the last Venturi to be considered French, before the firm became based in Monaco.

== Venturi 300 GTR ==
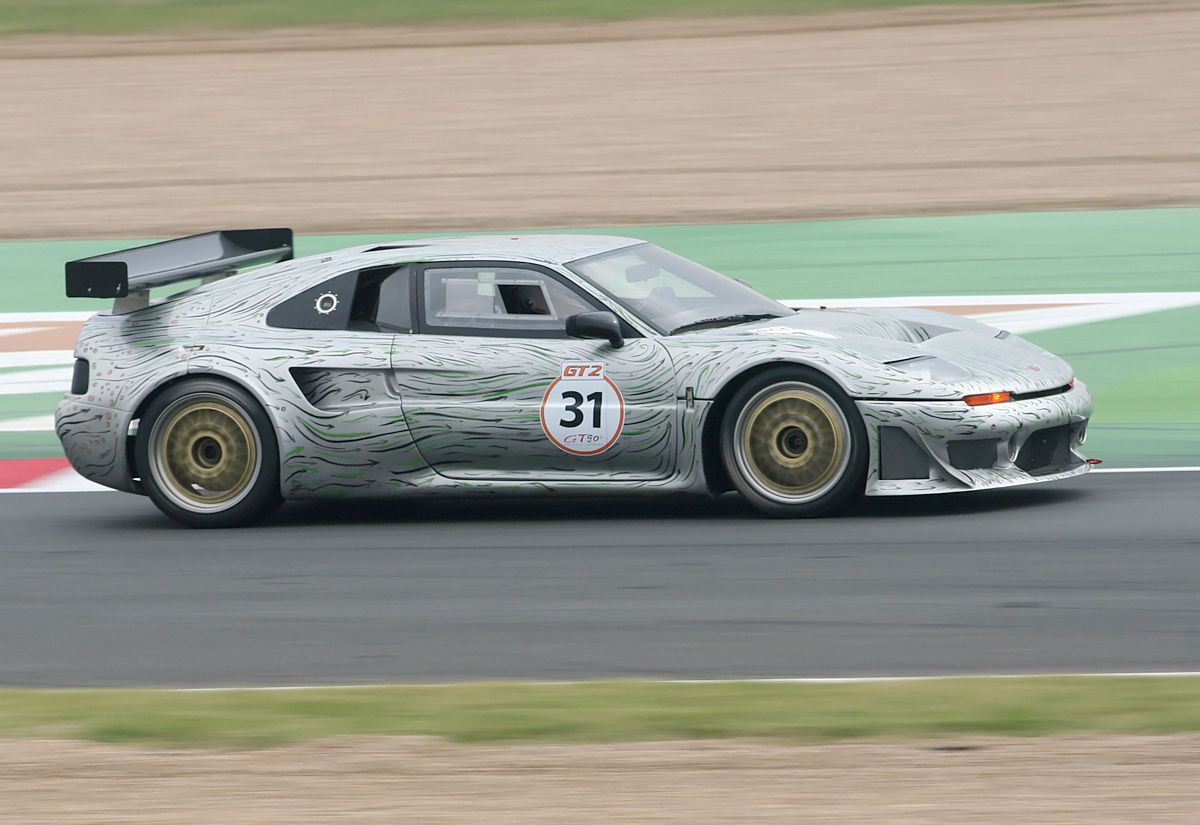
Venturi 300 GTR

In 1999, 2 cars were built exclusively for track racing. They were designated Venturi 300 GTR.

== Reception and fate ==
Sales of the Atlantique were extremely poor; total Venturi sales over its lifespan amounted to fewer than 700, despite praise from contemporary critics and from Top Gear. In a 1992 episode, Jeremy Clarkson noted that the two most exciting sports cars of the time were the Alpine A610 and the Venturi Atlantique, and that the Atlantique was "like having your own personal jet fighter [...] I love it to death." In comparing the biturbo Atlantique and the Lotus Esprit, Performance Car noted that the Atlantique was "[...] a more relaxing car to drive, its tidier dimensions make it easier to place, it rides more smoothly, generates far less road noise, and has a much slicker gearchange. It's better built too."

Venturi again faced bankruptcy in 2000, and the Atlantique went out of production. Although current owner Gildo Pallanca Pastor, a Monegasque millionaire, has resumed production of Venturi cars, he has shifted the emphasis to electric sports cars such as the Venturi Fétish, retiring the Atlantique badge. Company production will be even more limited at 10 units per year.
