= Venturi Fétish =

Electric sports car

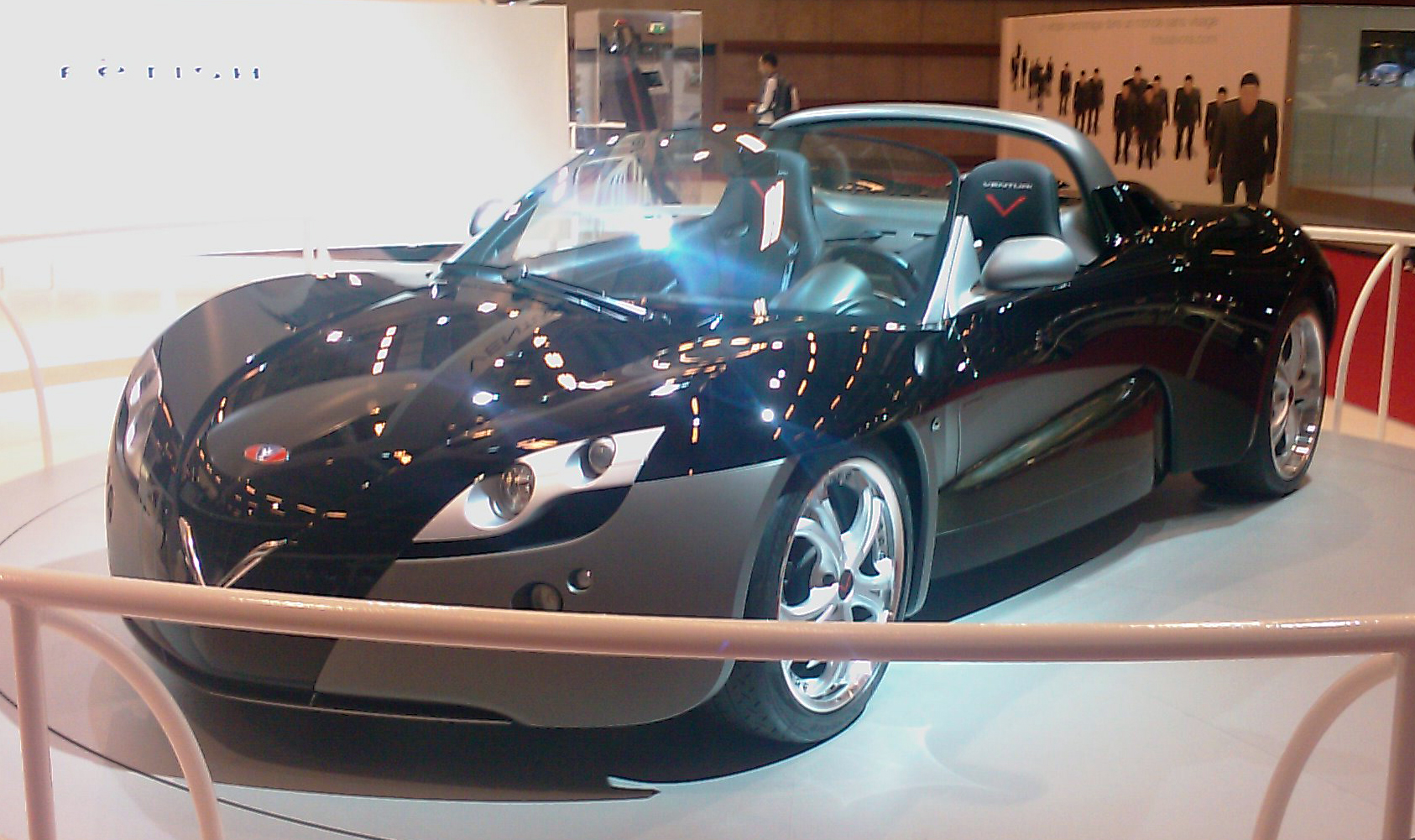

Overview
- Manufacturer: Venturi (electric car company)
- Production: 2004–2007
- Designer: Sacha Lakic

Body and chassis
- Class: Sports car
- Body style: 2-door convertible
- Layout: Rear mid-engine, rear-wheel-drive layout

Powertrain
- Electric motor: 2006–2011: 180 kW (241 hp; 245 PS); 2011–present: 220 kW (295 hp; 299 PS), central rear mounted
- Transmission: Differential gear reduction with limited-slip differential, direct hold
- Battery: 54 kWh Lithium polymer
- Range: 340 km (211 mi)

Dimensions
- Wheelbase: 2,600 mm (102.4 in)
- Length: 3,935 mm (154.9 in)
- Width: 1,885 mm (74.2 in)
- Height: 1,180 mm (46.5 in)
- Curb weight: 1,225 kg (2,701 lb)

The Venturi Fétish was an early-2000s two-seater limited-production electric sports car. The car was built by Venturi in Monaco, and the design of the car was done by the Parisian designers Sacha Lakic. It holds the title of being the first electric sports car in history. It was first unveiled in 2002 and was sold for the first time in November 2004 in the Japanese market. Only 25 units have been produced. Production of the car was stopped in 2007, with a new version being launched in 2010.

== Overview ==
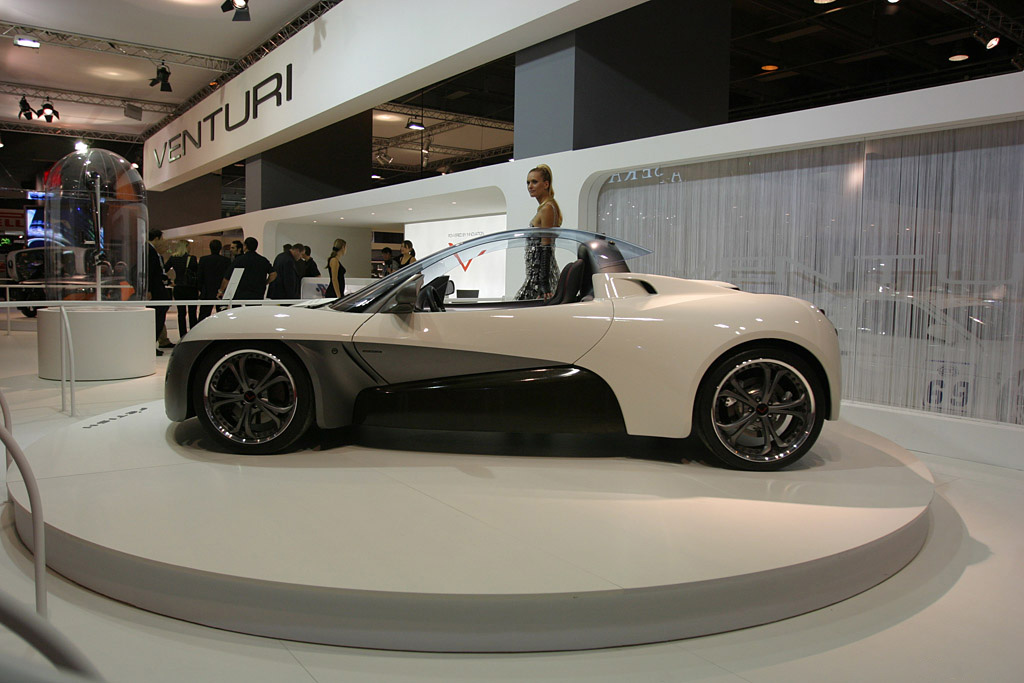
Venturi Fétish at the 2006 Paris Motor Show

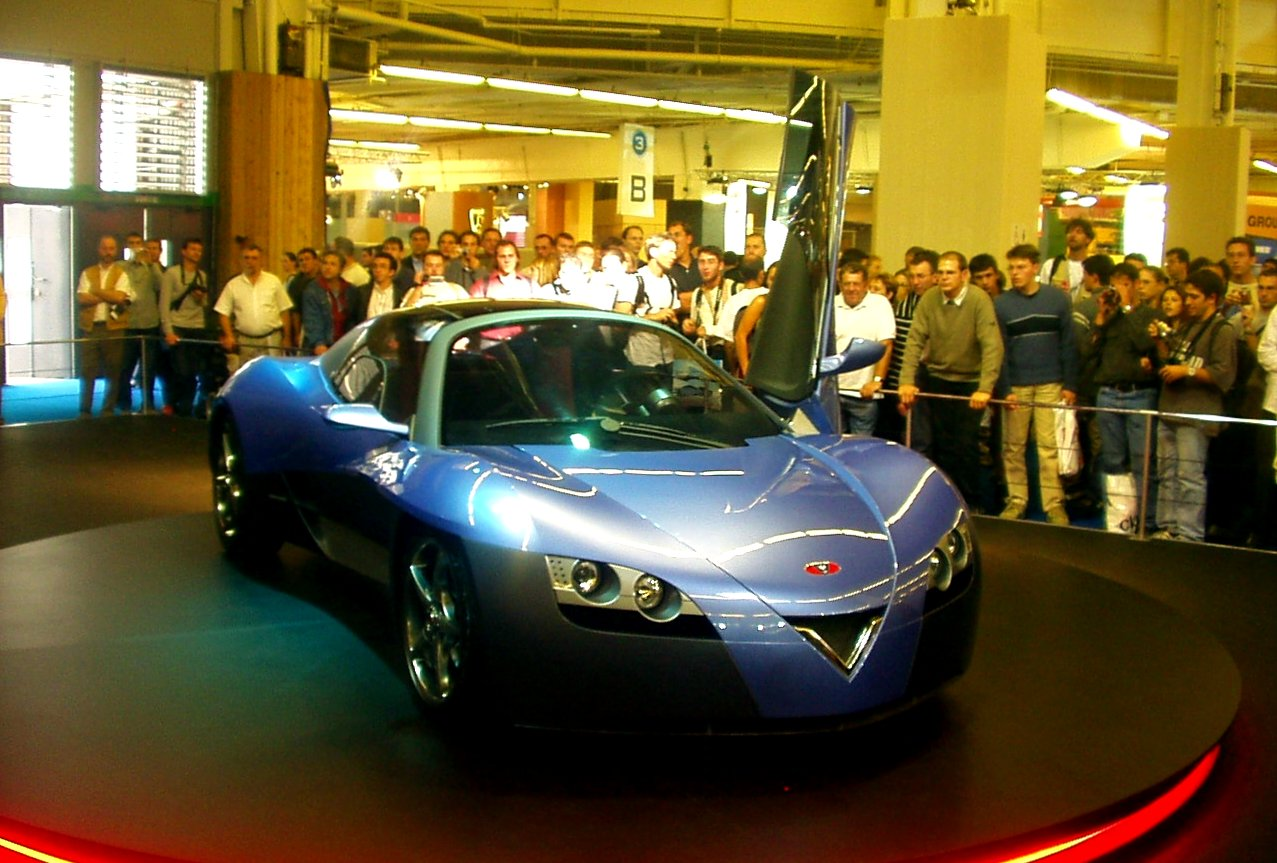
A concept Venturi Fétish (with a Renault petrol engine) at the 2002 Paris Motor Show

Before its electric version, a petrol version of the same vehicle (fitted with a Renault petrol engine) was introduced in concept form at the 2002 Geneva Motor Show, and was also shown at the 2002 Paris Motor Show and the 2003 North American International Auto Show. First sold in the year 2004, a new version of the car was launched in 2010. It is not a mass-produced vehicle. Only 25 units have been produced. The production of this electric sports car was stopped in the year 2007.

== Technical specifications ==
The original electric Fétish used a 180 kW (241 hp; 245 PS) electric motor in place of the internal combustion engine fitted to most sports cars. This electric motor reportedly had a maximum torque output of 220 N⋅m (162 lb⋅ft), which could be applied nearly instantaneously. Venturi claimed that the Fétish could accelerate from 0–100 km/h (0–62 mph) in 4.5 seconds, and that it was restricted to a top speed of 106 mph (171 km/h).

For 2011, the 180 kW motor was replaced by a 220 kW (295 hp; 299 PS) motor, and the updated Fétish was claimed to be capable of 200 km/h (124 mph) and to be able to accelerate from 0–60 mph (0–97 km/h) in four seconds.

== See also ==
- List of production battery electric vehicles
- Lightning GT
- Tesla Roadster (2008)
- Wrightspeed X1
