= 1993 24 Hours of Le Mans =

61st 24 Hours of Le Mans endurance race

Previous: 1992	Next: 1994
Index: Races | Winners

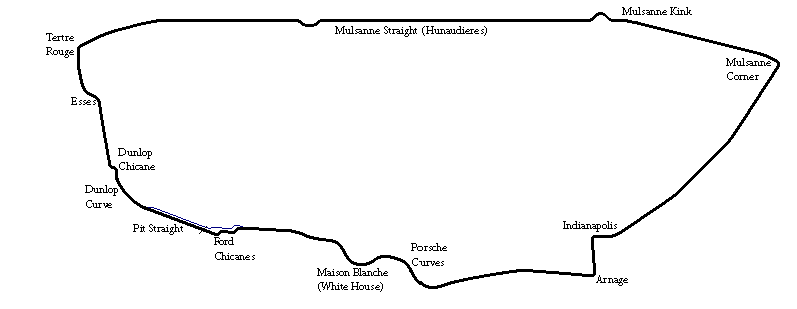
Le Mans in 1993

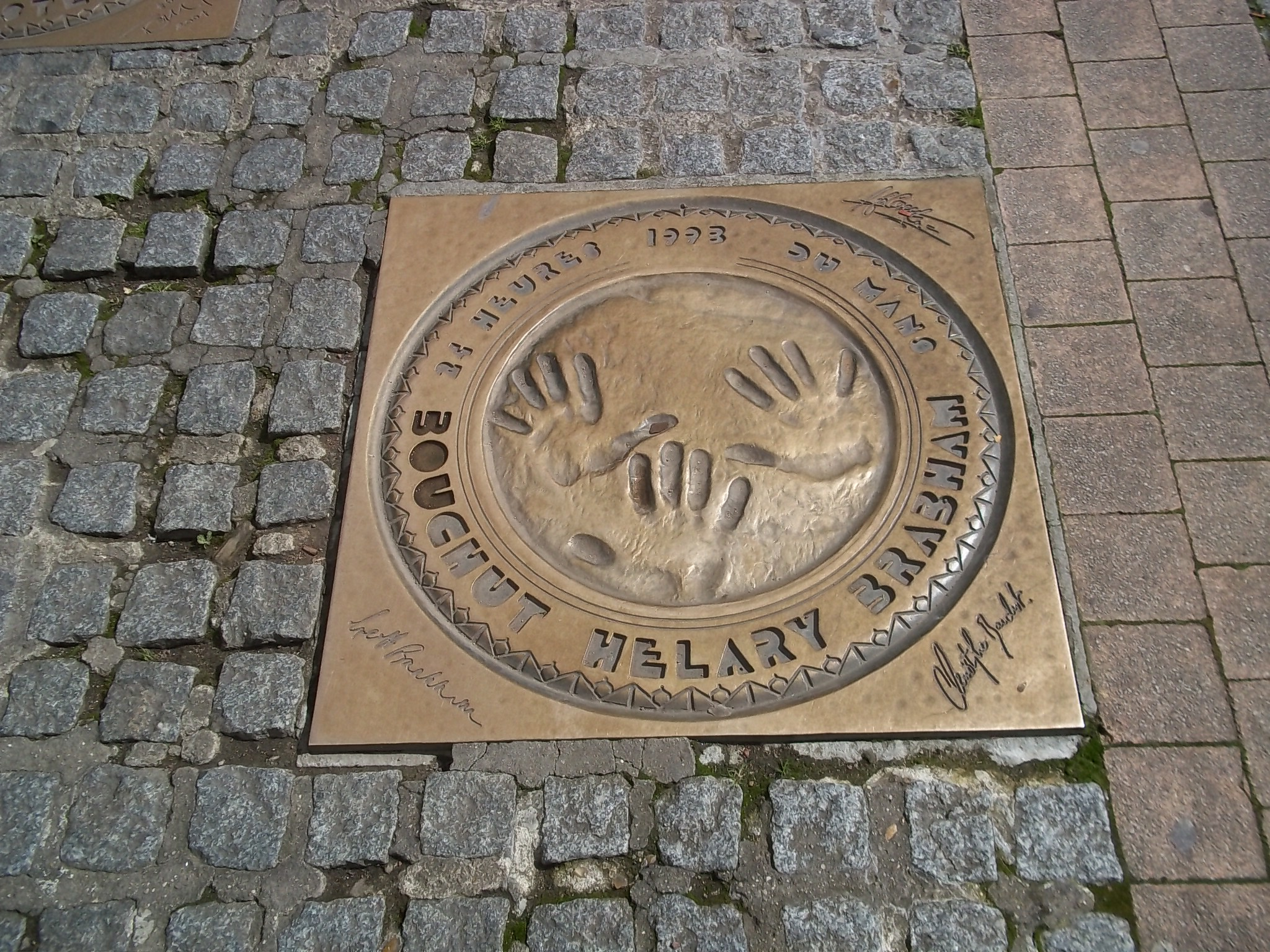
1993 Le Mans Victory plaque for Bouchut/Hélary/Brabham

The 1993 24 Hours of Le Mans was the 61st Grand Prix of Endurance, taking place at the Circuit de la Sarthe on the 19 and 20 June 1993. The race was won by Peugeot Talbot Sport, with drivers Geoff Brabham, and Le Mans rookies Éric Hélary and Christophe Bouchut completing 375 laps in their Peugeot 905 Evo 1B. At the end of 1992, FISA had cancelled the Sportscar World Championship. This allowed the ACO to create their own regulations. As well as continuing the Group C classes, they opened the race to Grand Touring (GT) style cars for the first time since the 1986 race. It was expected, again, to be a Peugeot vs Toyota contest, each with a trio of cars entered. Philippe Alliot took his third consecutive pole position for Peugeot and from the start of the race, it was Alliot and Eddie Irvine who set the pace. However, both cars lost several laps with engine issues so, going into the evening, it was Thierry Boutsen and Geoff Lees contesting the lead. This ended at 11pm when Juan Manuel Fangio II's Toyota was punted from behind by a GT car missing its braking point.

When Fabi's Peugeot pitted from first at 3.30am with electrical problems, it was the hitherto conservatively-run third Peugeot that inherited the lead they would not relinquish. The other Category 1 cars struggled to make up time, particularly the Toyotas who, for the second year in succession, suffered from transmission issues. When Irvine's Toyota pitted from third at Sunday lunchtime, and lost 10 laps with a gearbox rebuild, the race was won for Peugeot who came home with a 1-2-3 finish. A consolation prize for Toyota was that their privateer teams claimed the Category 2 class-win, beating the Porsches and Courages, finishing 5th and 6th with Irvine's car making it back up to 4th. In the GT class, it was a contest between Porsche (a single works car and a number of customer teams) and Jaguar (three cars run by Tom Walkinshaw Racing). After the works Porsche was delayed, the Jaguars headed the class, with the car of John Nielsen, David Brabham and David Coulthard finishing 15th overall. However, they had been running under appeal for the race for not having catalytic converters as the production car had. A month after the race, they were disqualified, and the class win went to the Monaco Média team Porsche Carrera.

== Regulations ==
Outside of Le Mans, the Sportscar World Championship in 1992 had very poor fields and in October the FISA (Fédération Internationale du Sport Automobile) Commission had officially cancelled the series that had been running, in various guises, continuously since 1953. The idea to run the premier class on F1-derived engines had proven to be a spectacular failure with negligible interest from the major car manufacturers, and the costs too high for customer teams. Several manufacturers did take engines into Formula 1, but as mentioned, the costs were too high to do both series. Indeed, many commentators felt that this had been Bernie Ecclestone's plan all along. Without the support, both the American and Japanese sports series collapsed as well. For Le Mans, the 1992 race had seen the lowest number of entries since 1932. Soon after the series cancellation, and with no alternative international series proposed, the Automobile Club de l'Ouest (ACO) took matters into its own hands, drafting up regulations for a new "Le Mans Prototype" category: open-cockpit, flat-bottomed cars powered by regular production or restricted race engines. Early in 1993 the American IMSA federation also announced a new "World Sports Car" category along very similar (but, crucially, not identical) lines.

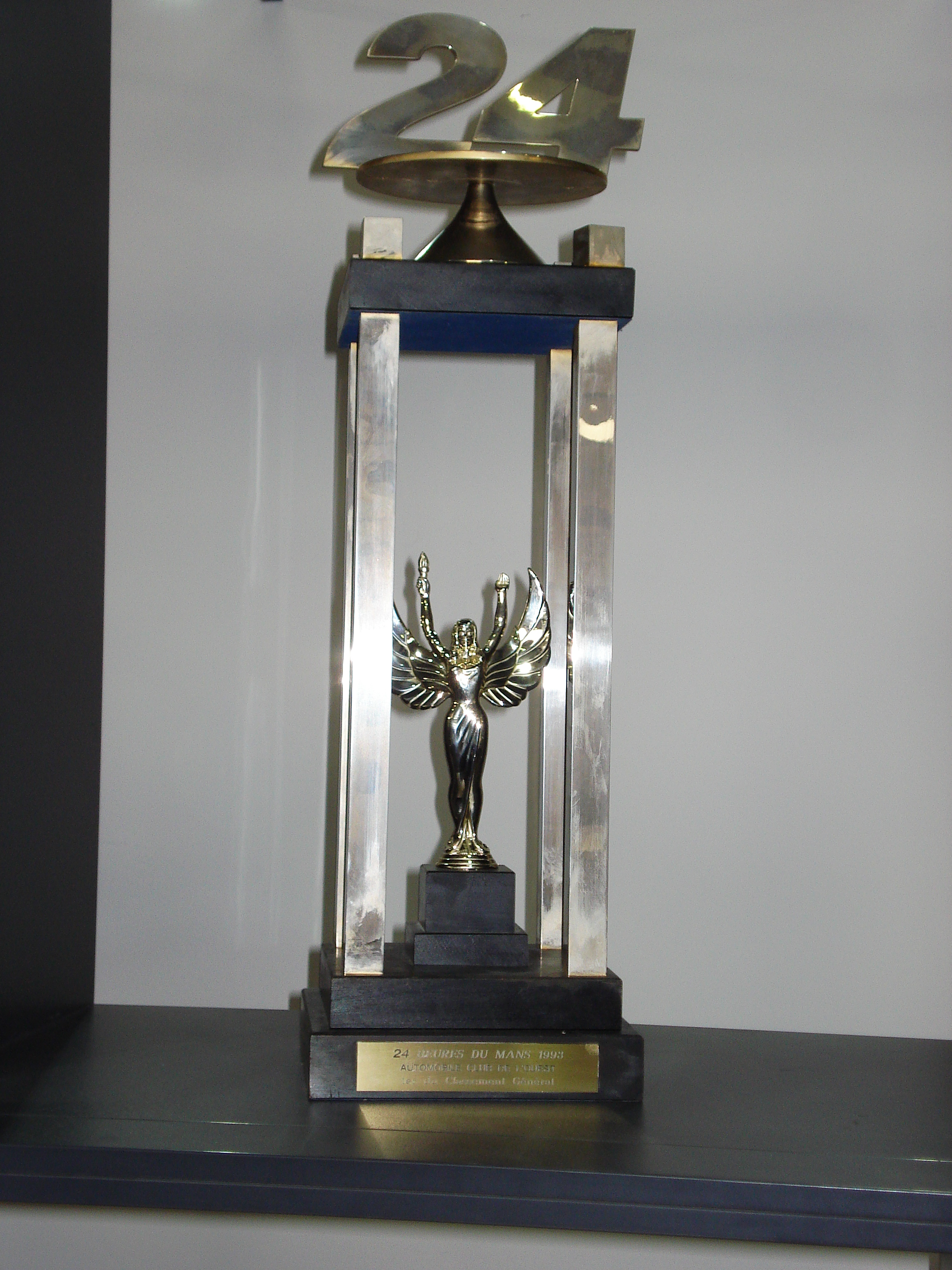
The new Overall Winner's trophy

The ACO took the step of drafting their own class-list similar to the previous year, but also augment it with the new crop of supercars coming onto the market:

- Category 1 - for the 1991-92 FIA Sportscars (in effect, the Peugeot and Toyota works cars)
- Category 2 - Group C cars from IMSA or the pre-1991 regulations
- Category 3 - cars in the new IMSA WSC, using 3.0L production or F3000 engines
- Category 4 – for GT cars

The Category 2 cars could now be allowed to run without the FIA fuel or weight restrictions. Instead, air-inlet restrictors on the engines would be used to balance performance. It was also the cars' age that counted against them now, with modern ground effects having developed a lot in the past few years. Category 3 looked to accommodate the new IMSA regulations, and were also balanced by engine restrictors, as was the new Category 4. This was a significant return of GT cars to Le Mans, where the last such car to race was a solitary Group B BMW M1 in 1986. The class rules were the ACO's version of the forthcoming GT regulations still being drafted by FISA. They would accept modified production GTs and cars from equivalent national championships, with a power output limited to a maximum of 500 bhp.

This year, the ACO required that teams had to qualify the cars they intended to race. This closed the Test-Car loophole where teams would rotate their drivers through a T-car with its engine wound up for qualification. Reserve cars were allowed, in case the main car was damaged in practice but they would have to start at the back of the grid. The other change was the return of the Test Day in mid-May for the teams, which had last been held in 1987. Another notable change related to safety at the pit-stops, where teams were no longer allowed to do any other work on the car while it was being refuelled. This meant tyre-changes were less likely, to minimise time spent stationery, and so teams would tend to double- or triple-stint their tyres. Max Mosley, President of FISA, was dismissive and very disparaging of the regulations and the ACO, yet it was his format that had virtually killed endurance racing.

This year, 70 years after the inaugural race, saw the presentation of a grand new set of trophies. Inspired by the Borg-Warner Trophy for the Indianapolis 500, the main trophy for the outright winners was 1.2 metres (47") high. It was hefty enough that all three drivers had to lift it – symbolic of the teamwork required. The centrepiece was a representation of the Winged Victory of Samothrace within four solid columns. Finally, 1993 saw the first appearance of Bruno Vandestick as the official race announcer, which he has held now for over 30 years – a role that starts at 7am on Saturday until after the presentations on Sunday afternoon with only a 4-hour rest overnight.

== Entries ==
With no official ties to FISA anymore, the ACO was free to open the entry list as they saw fit. The problem was that most manufacturers had moved onto new projects or got out of motor-racing all together. Peugeot, Mercedes, Jaguar and Toyota were all developing engines to go into F1 in the near future. There were also a reduced number of suitable cars, and it would take time for the new Le Mans Prototypes to come into fruition. The proposed four classes proved attractive to the major customer racing teams and soon a number of Group C and GT teams lined up. When entries closed in April, it had a full field of 58, including the first Ferrari (a GT) to appear since 1984.

Class	Quantity	Turbo / Supercharged engines
Category 1 SWC prototypes	7 / 6	0 / 0
Category 2 Group C	16 / 15	12 / 12
Category 3 Invitational	3 / 3	1 / 1
Category 4 GT	32 / 23	15 / 13
Total Entries	58 / 47	28 / 26

- Note: The first number is the number accepted, the second the number who started.

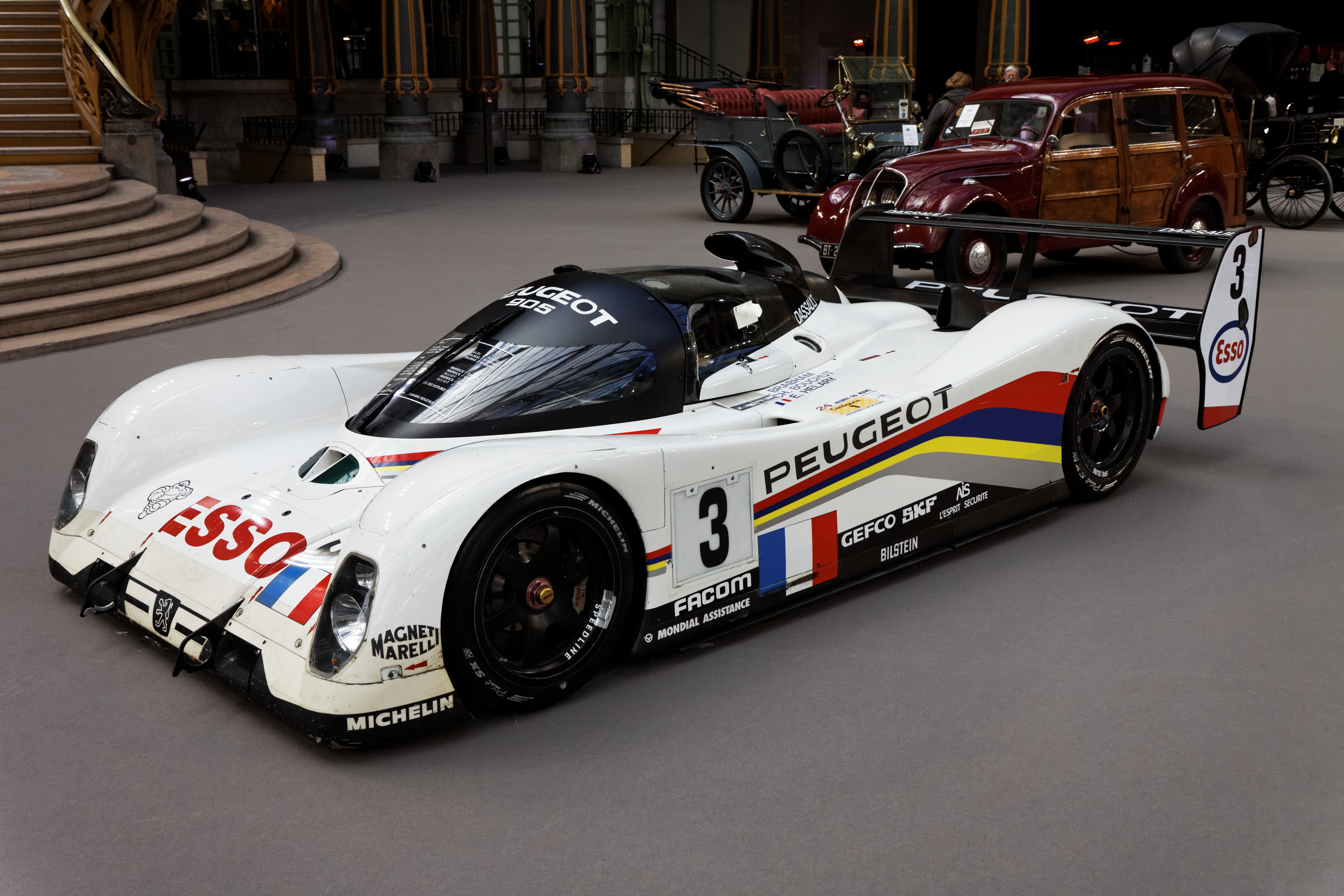
Peugeot 905 Evo 1C

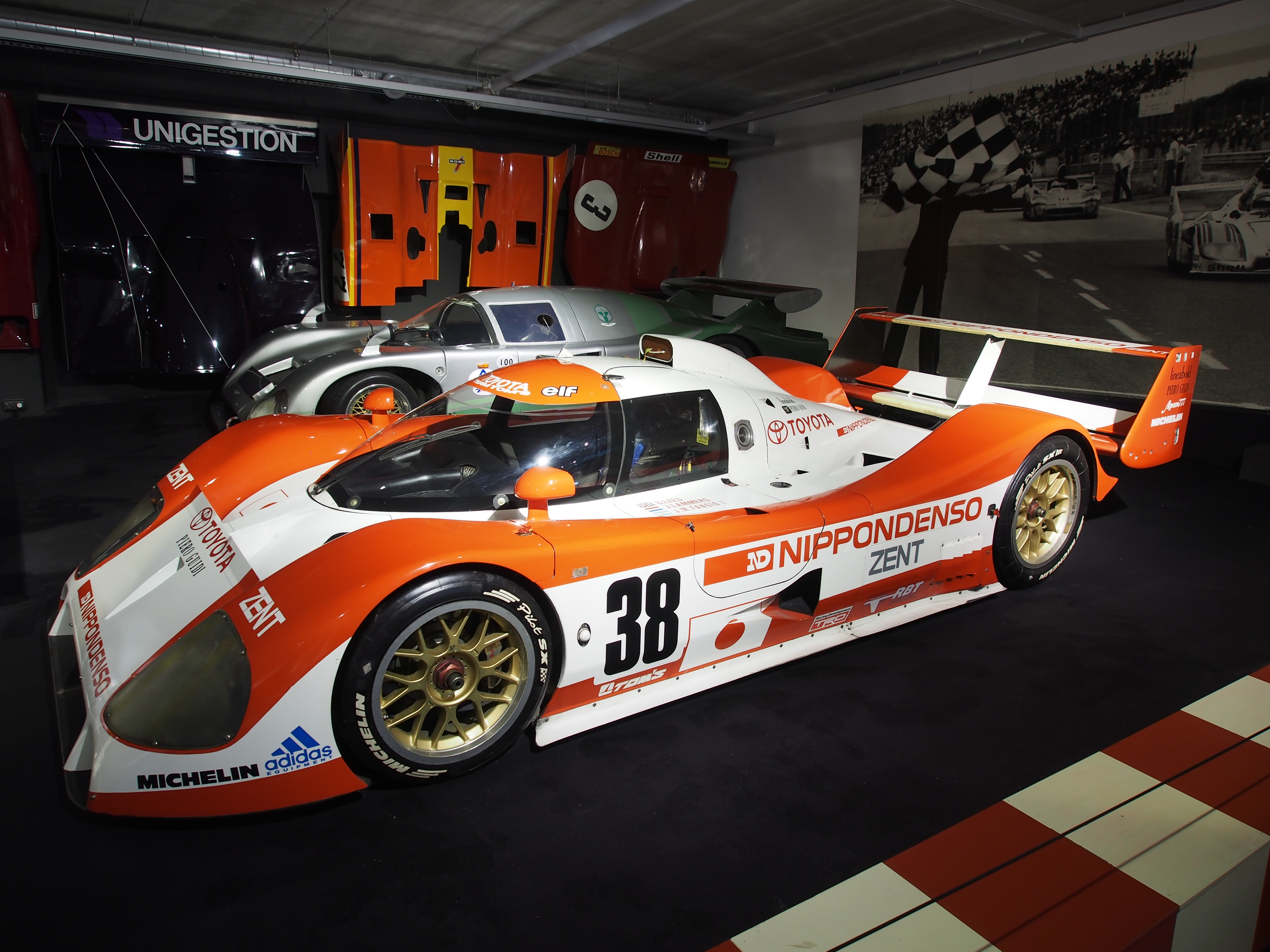
Toyota TS010

=== Category 1 ===
Peugeot Talbot Sport had convincingly won the 1992 Sportscar World Championship, taking victory in five of the six rounds. Before the cancellation of the championship, Peugeot was already well advanced in developing its ultimate version of the Peugeot 905, the Evo 2.2, but it never raced. Instead, when it was realised that Le Mans would be the only race in the calendar and a 'last hurrah', team director Jean Todt and his engineers adapted the existing gull-wing chassis to a C-variant. This was fitted with the rear end of the Evo 2.2 with a new transverse, sequential gearbox. The driver squad had changed a bit from 1992. Philippe Alliot, Mauro Baldi and Jean-Pierre Jabouille were together again. Last year's winner Yannick Dalmas raced with Teo Fabi (latterly at Toyota) and F1 veteran Thierry Boutsen, while the third car was driven by young French debutantes Éric Hélary and Christophe Bouchut with Australian 4-time IMSA champion Geoff Brabham.

Toyota returned with their TS010. In England, chief designer Tony Southgate refined the aerodynamics and front suspension. Meanwhile, in Japan, after the previous year's issues, the V10 engine and gearbox were strengthened and three new chassis built. In March, the Toyota team joined Peugeot in running their tests at the Circuit Paul Ricard. Regular team driver Geoff Lees raced with Jan Lammers and Juan Manuel Fangio II. Fangio was current IMSA-champion, having won with the dominating Eagle-Toyota Mk III with All-American Racers. The second had Eddie Irvine/Masanori Sekiya/Toshio Suzuki while the third had Fangio's IMSA teammates Andy Wallace and Kenny Acheson, with Pierre-Henri Raphanel.

Coming very late to the Group C party was a sports prototype from Allard. The Allard Motor Company had been a regular attendee to Le Mans in the 1950s, before going bankrupt at the end of that decade. A group of engineers and racers, including Chris Humberstone (ex-Brun), Costas Los and Jean-Louis Ricci, bought the rights to the Allard name and the remaining assets of Spice Engineering with a view to develop of car for the 3.5-litre formula using the Cosworth DFR engine. Former Brun aerodynamicist John Iley designed the J2X with an eye-catching high-downforce styling that earned it the nickname "Batmobile". Testing was done on US racetracks, but an engine contract with Honda was thwarted by the latter's full commitment to the IndyCar series. The project was then purchased by Robert Lamplough. At the May Test-Day, the downforce proved too strong for the high-speed circuit and Lamplough could not get faster than 275 km/h (170 mph) – around 100 km/h slower than the competition.

=== Category 2 ===
This year, the ACO once again pitted the former Group C cars against each other, in one class for honours. Toyota had taken the win last year when the regulations were skewed. Despite the cancelation of the All-Japan championship, Toyota had fine-tuned the aerodynamics on their car, as the 93C-V, for their two customer teams. Shin Kato's SARD team had team regular Roland Ratzenberger along with Mauro Martini and Naoki Nagasaka. Their compatriots, the Trust Racing Team, had their two drivers from last year, George Fouché and Steven Andskär, with ex-SARD driver Eje Elgh.

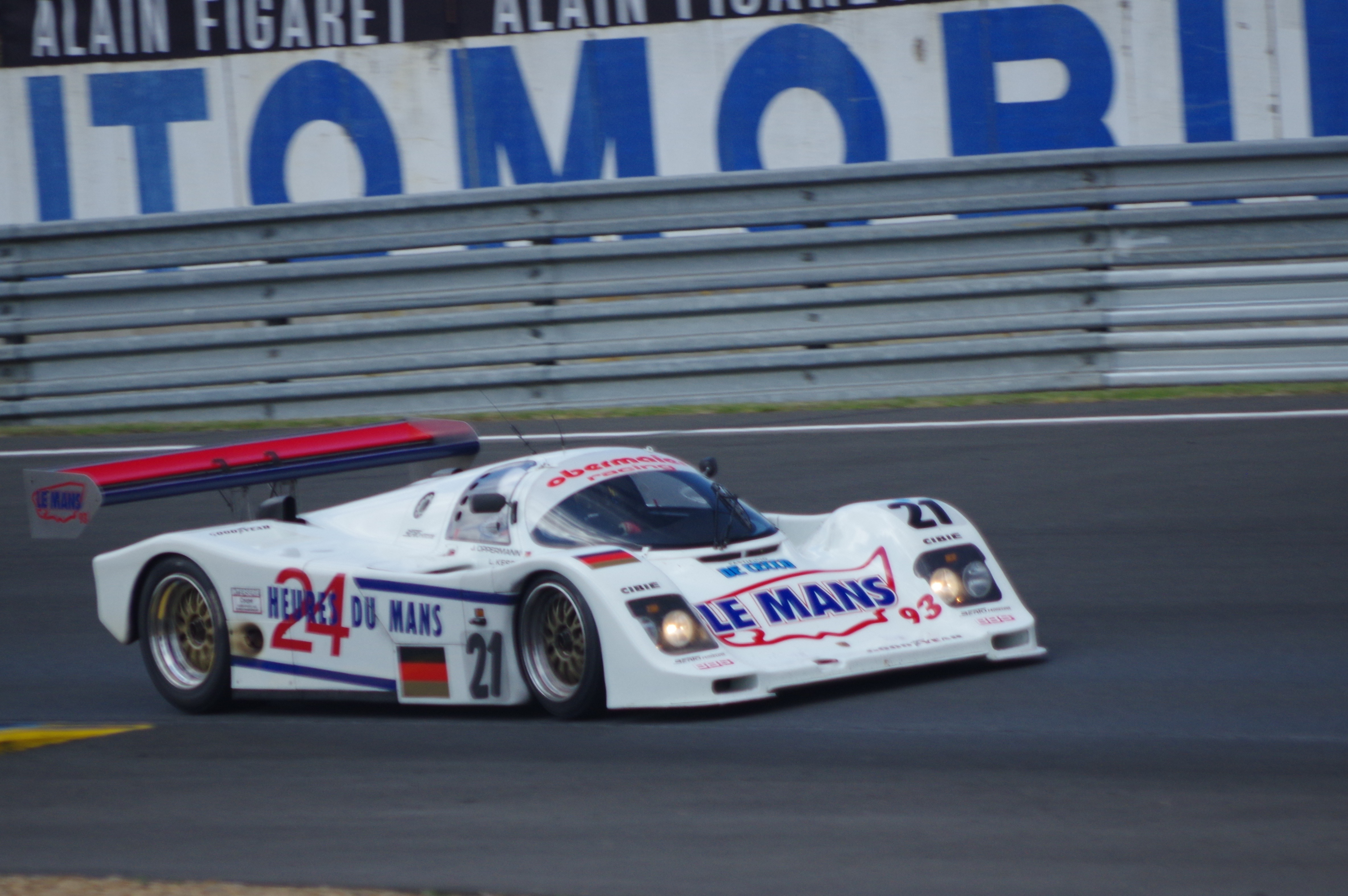
Porsche 962C of Obermaier Racing

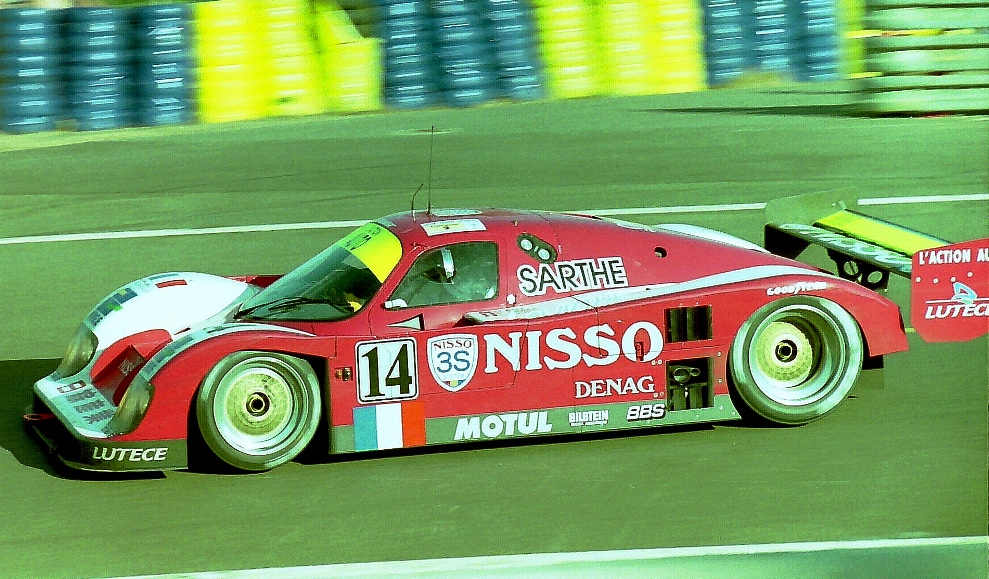
Courage C30LM

With no fuel restrictions on the Group C cars now, the big teams were convinced to enter. The advent of the air-inlet restrictors did have a similar dampening effect as the power output was brought down to under 600 bhp. But at least, in this final year of Group C, the cars could be driven flat-out, without having to keep one eye on the fuel-consumption. Coupled with also being around 150 kg heavier than the Category 1 cars, the Porsches could not be competitive for outright victory with what was, effectively, a 9-year-old design. Kremer Racing had been ever-present in the past few years, despite the tough regulations penalising the Porsches. The team arrived with three of their modified version of the 962, the K6. A carbon-hull version was to be driven by Giovanni Lavaggi, Jürgen Lässig (latterly with Obermaier) and South African Wayne Taylor. The other two were aluminium-hulled cars. Almo Coppelli and Robin Donovan raced again for Kremer and were joined by American adventurer Steve Fossett. The other car had François Migault, Tomás Saldaña and Wall Street banker Andy Evans. Kremer's perennial rivals, Joest Racing, had missed 1992 but returned this year with a pair of low-downforce langheck 962s. As always, the team had a solid driver lineup. Bob Wollek and Henri Pescarolo had an incredible 48 Le Mans starts between them including 7 with Joest. However, they had only raced together once - for Courage, at the previous year's race. They joined forces again, this year with debutant Ronny Meixner, who had won the GT category at Daytona race this year. The second Joest car had regular team drivers Frank Jelinski and "John Winter" joined by Manuel Reuter, who had won the race in 1989 with Sauber-Mercedes.

Like the Kremer brothers, Hans Obermaier had been a stalwart for Porsche in the latter Group C years. The car was the first 962 to be fitted with carbon-carbon brakes for the race – giving a significant improvement in stopping power. Jürgen Lässig had been with the team throughout that period, but his move to Kremer meant Otto Altenbach stepped up as senior driver, joined by Jürgen Oppermann and Loris Kessel. The fourth Porsche team was that of Frenchman Guy Chotard. The car was the ex-Momo 962 that had raced at Le Mans in 1990 in the IMSA-GTP class. The all-French driver lineup was to include former F1 driver Jean-Pierre Beltoise, who had raced for Matra and BRM twenty years earlier. He also had fourteen Le Mans starts in the 1960s to 1970s, the last of which was in 1979 for Jean Rondeau. However, come race week, he was too unwell to compete, and his place was taken by Denis Morin. Beltoise stayed on, in the pits, as a team strategist.

Yves Courage had been entering Le Mans with his own Cougar cars since the start of the Group C period in 1982. In the close-season, the Ford Motor Company ordered Courage to stop using the "Cougar" name, as they had trademarked it for their Mercury Cougar roadcar. Unperturbed, the team rebadged the new model as the Courage C30LM. Reusing the existing chassis and the 3-litre Porsche engine, it had refined suspension and bodyshell. Three cars came to Le Mans. With Pescarolo and Wollek going to Joest, Derek Bell was recruited as lead driver. He was joined by Courage regulars Lionel Robert and Pascal Fabre in the lead car.

The opening up of regulations allowed a return for the Spice SE89C. Chamberlain Engineering dusted off the car that had won last year's FIA Cup. The car ran with a 3.5-litre Cosworth DFZ With those winning drivers now involved with the Chamberlain's Lotus project, the car was driven by team-regular Nick Adams/Hervé Regout/Andy Petery. Likewise, Graff Racing brought their SE89C for a fourth run, with three young French rookies as their drivers. It ran with an older 3.3-litre DFL engine. A third Spice, the SE90C of GP Motorsport, was entered but did not arrive. Another anachronistic return was by Roland Bassaler and his Sauber SHS C6. Built in 1982, it was originally run by Sauber then Brun Motorsport. Bassaler had bought the car in 1985, regularly running at Le Mans through the 1980s until 1988. Despite updates over the years, the old aluminium chassis made it one of the heaviest cars in the class and the 3.5-litre BMW engine only put out 450 bhp which left it down on power.

=== Category 3 ===
The small Welter Racing team returned with an improved version of their centre-seat spyder. Called the LM92/3, the car had an aluminium honeycomb monocoque chassis and was fitted with the same 2-litre engine as in the Peugeot 405 Turbo 16 rally-car. With the Garrett turbo and fuel-injection, it could put out an impressive 725 bhp (more than the Peugeots and Porsches) and with a carbon-kevlar bodyshell, the car only weighed 658 kg. Drivers were Patrick Gonin, Bernard Santal and Alain Lamouille.

Didier Bonnet brought his new Debora SP93 from the French Coupe Alfa Romeo series. The 3-litre V6 from the Alfa Romeo 164 Quadrifoglio Verde was now tuned up to 230 bhp, and at 637 kg, the low-profile sports-racer was the lightest car in the field. The only C3 entrant to run at the Test weekend, it had gone 20 seconds faster than the SP92 had the previous year. Lead driver was future touring-car superstar Yvan Muller, who had just won the 1992 British Formula Two Championship. The only other entry in Category 3 was from the Italian Coupe Alfa Romeo series. Lucchini Engineering had been set up in 1980, with their first race-car coming out in 1986. The Lucchini SP91 was their seventh model, fitted with the same Alfa Romeo engine as the Debora on an aluminium chassis with a carbon-kevlar bodyshell. It was entered by the Sport and Imagine team of "Gigi" Taverna, who had previously raced C2 Albas and Olmas at Le Mans.

=== Category 4 ===
GT cars returned to Le Mans after a seven-year absence, and the prospect of high-performance supercars racing off against each other generated a lot of interest with a big entry of 32 cars – making up over half the field. Porsche had always been the backbone of GT racing at Le Mans for over twenty years, with its ubiquitous Porsche 911 and its derivatives. The newest iteration was the Porsche 964, and the company decided in November to develop a one-off turbo special for a works-supported effort at Le Mans. They fitted a smaller, 3160cc version of the air-cooled twin-turbo road car, that developed 480 bhp that could get up to 305 kp/h (190 mph). With only 2 valves per cylinder, the ACO regulations allowed it bigger air-restrictors than the 4-valve cars. It had flared rear wheel-arches with cooling inlets to accommodate the 12" Goodyear tyres and big brakes. It was also the first car at Le Mans to race with an Anti-lock braking system (built by Bosch). Although the first road-car with ABS was the Mercedes-Benz S-Class in 1978, the new GT regulations required entrants to conform to the equipment fitted to the roadcar version.

Hans-Joachim Stuck and Hurley Haywood were two-time Le Mans winners with the Porsche works team, and with rally champion Walter Röhrl, had taken a class-victory at the Sebring 12-hours in the USA earlier in the year for the Brumos Porsche team. The three were the line-up for Le Mans as well, and although Joest Racing did the shakedown at the Test Day (clocking 8 seconds faster than the Jaguars), the works team was reformed for the big race. Customer teams and privateers backed up the effort with a phalanx of Porsche GTs, with eleven entries. Half were equipped with the non-turbo 964 model, the Carrera RSR. The 3.8-litre engine was the largest engine yet fitted to the Porsche 911 range and could generate 330 bhp. The Carrera RS was fitted with a 300 bhp 3.6-litre engine, as was the Carrera Cup version. Jack Leconte's Larbre Compétition joined with Jean-Pierre Jarier's Monaco Média team with two RSRs. Obermaier Racing augmented their Group C effort entering an RSR and a Cup car. Konrad Motorsport on the other hand had abandoned their project to build an in-house Group C car and came to Le Mans with a Carrera RSR.

The Jaguar XJ220C had only recently gone into production. It was a mid-engine design and the first road-car to utilise underbody airflow to generate downforce. Originally designed around a V12, to reduce weight the production model had the 3.5-litre V6 twin-turbo that was based on that run in the XJR-10 and was their first racing turbocharged engine. Jaguar renewed their relationship with Tom Walkinshaw Racing via a new, purpose-formed company - Project XJ220 Ltd with Richard Owen as chief designer. The chassis was a honeycomb hull with carbon/kevlar door panels all to reduce weight, with a front splitter and adjustable rear wing to improve downforce. The V6 engine could put out 540 bhp with two Garrett turbochargers and push the car up to 305 km/h. Unveiled in January, it did testing at Silverstone in February with David Leslie. At the Test Day in May, the team was alarmed to find themselves 12 seconds slower than the turbo-Porsche, and more testing followed. TWR brought three cars to Le Mans: Leslie raced with long time Walkinshaw drivers Win Percy and Armin Hahne; Jaguar Le Mans winner John Nielsen was teamed with single-seater youngsters David Brabham and David Coulthard while the third car had Paul Belmondo/Andreas Fuchs/Jay Cochran.

In France, a single-make supercar race series had been set up for the new Venturi. The first prototypes had been built in the former Rondeau factory near Le Mans and the first production model, the Venturi 200, appeared in 1987. It had the turbocharged V6 PRV engine of the Renault Alpine GTA. The first customer had been Raymond Gouloumes, president of the ACO. After several ownership and managerial changes, it was decided to promote the brand through motorsport. Initially, Venturi bought a majority share of Gérard Larrousse F1 team, then an in-house competition department was set up, led by Stéphane Ratel. He organised the Venturi Trophy race-series for "gentlemen drivers" with 30 identical cars, using the new Venturi 400. The car had received further refinement and evolution from several former Rondeau design engineers and was to be the first road-car fitted with carbon-carbon brakes. The latest iteration to showcase at Le Mans would be the 500LM, and it was now fitted with a 3.0-litre PRV twin-turbo. Supposedly capable of 500 bhp, it was closer to 430 bhp. The bodyshell was a combination of carbon and kevlar. Seven of those sold were present at Le Mans – the first to privateers "Rocky" Agusta (heir to the MV Agusta motorcycle company), Éric Graham and Alain Lamouille. Next up were the new racing teams of BBA Compétition (of Jean-Luc Maury-Laribière, Jacadi Racing and Équipe Toison d'Or. Jacadi attracted much local media attention by signing former F1 hero Jacques Laffite and French TV talk-show host Christophe Dechavanne. The final entry was from Stéphane Ratel himself, who brought in the experienced Group C driver Costas Los as his lead.

Lotus Cars had achieved success in the US with their remodelled Lotus Esprit X180R, with "Doc" Bundy winning the 1992 IMSA Supercar Championship. The new Series 4 was designed around a limited-edition Esprit 300. Strengthening of the chassis was offset by using composite materials. The car was widened to accommodate bigger tyres and the suspension stiffened. The 2.2-litre DOHC engine, with a single Garrett turbo, put out 300 bhp in the road-car and was tuned up to 400 bhp in the race-car. With the Lotus Formula 1 team in dire straits, a tilt at Le Mans in the revived GT category was seen as a good avenue for promoting the new car. The experienced team of Hugh Chamberlain entered two works cars. However, the factory was not able to have the cars ready for the Test Day in May, and in the end the cars were only finished the day before scrutineering. After 13 entries with the Mazdaspeed works team, Yojiro Terada moved to lead the team, racing with Dane Thorkild Thyrring and British Pro-Sport champion Peter Hardman. The other car had the same three (Richard Piper, Olindo Iacobelli and Ferdinand de Lesseps) that ran together for Chamberlain in 1992.

Robin Smith's Simpson Engineering team brought the first Ferrari to race in a Le Mans since 1984. The 348LM was the current GT model for the marque and used in the new single-make Ferrari Challenge series in Europe. It had 3.4-litre mid-mounted V8 engine with four valves per cylinder, and was the final model developed by Enzo Ferrari before his death in 1988. Smith had periodically raced Group C2 cars at Le Mans over the past 15 years, and was joined by a regular co-driver Stefano Sebastiani, a London-resident Italian, and Japanese Ferrari driver-journalist Tetsuya Ota.

A surprise entry to the supercar field was a design based on advanced composites. The MiG M100 had originated as the MCA Centenaire – a project by Monegasque boatbuilder Fulvio Ballabio, who had raced single-seaters in Europe then North America in the 1980s. The Centenaire (named for the 100th anniversary of the Automobile Club de Monaco) had a 5.5-litre V12 Lamborghini engine and was the first GT car made of an all carbon-composite body and chassis. However, by 1992, only five had been built. Ballabio was approached by Georgian businessman Aleksandr Marianashvili, a fellow Monaco resident who offered to continue production in a factory in Tbilisi. The car was renamed the MiG M100 (where MiG was an abbreviation of the region of Mingrelia Georgia, in the west of the country on the Black Sea coast) and a Le Mans entry was seen as a potential showcase for sales. It was restyled as a coupe with a rear wing added. Race preparation was done at Giampiero Consonni's workshop near Monza. At the May test-day, Consonni and co-driver Pierre Honegger were unable to do laps below 5 minutes, over 30 seconds off the pace. Further tests at the Monza circuit confirmed the lack of performance, so it was decided to replace the engine with the 600 bhp 3.5-litre Subaru V12 developed by Motori Moderni for F1 several years previously. Unusually, it was installed on rubber mounts that would prove problematic in practice.

== Practice and Qualifying ==
Over a sunny race week, unsurprisingly the Category 1 works Peugeots and Toyotas set the pace. Philippe Alliot set the best time, a 3:24.9, but in a lap hampered by traffic it was almost 3 seconds slower than his pole the year before. In attempting to better their times, both teams damaged their chances: Alliot wrote his Peugeot off that evening in a big accident at almost 200 km/h (120 mph) in the Porsche Curves, while on Thursday Eddie Irvine spun at Mulsanne corner pushing with his car fitted with a special qualifying engine. It was expected that, per regulations, Peugeot would have to use a reserve car and start from the back of the grid. Incredibly though, they returned with the car fully repaired the next day. Considering the front suspension had been slammed into the monocoque, many people suspected a replacement had been built up on the reserve chassis but nothing could be proven and the officials took no action. So, in the end, the Wednesday times decided the grid. Alliot took a consecutive pole for Peugeot, with Irvine beside him (3:26.1) on the start line. The six works cars locked out the front three rows. The Porsche 962s in Category 2, hampered by engine restrictors, were at least 13 seconds slower than Alliot and Manuel Reuter (7th) was the fastest (3:37.6) in a Joest car, still over 5 seconds behind Bouchut in the Peugeot that qualified sixth. Bob Wollek lined up beside his teammate, in 8th, ahead of the Obermaier Porsche and Ratzenberger in the SARD Toyota. The WR put in a good effort to qualify 17th overall (3:55.0), well ahead of the Debora (4:18.3, in 26th).

In GT, the 964-series Turbo S of the Porsche works team was fastest (4:06.5, 21st on the grid) ahead of the three TWR (22nd, 24th, 25th). The Venturis had problems in practice and all seven needed the gear linkage changed and the fastest was that of Jacadi Racing, in 27th (4:19.7). However, the Lotus cars were off the pace, the quickest being Piper's, in 35th (4:31.4). Another driver to have a wild ride on Wednesday night was Andreas Fuchs, who suddenly found his Jaguar had no brakes approaching the first chicane on the back straight at full speed. It spun end-on-end, then slammed into the tyre barriers, stopping a few hundred metres later leaving the driver shaken but uninjured. One of the Obermaier Porsches would not make the start, after Sergio Brambilla drifted onto a kerb and smacked the barriers hard. Meanwhile, the Jaguars had been declared illegal after first qualification. The cars were not running with catalytic converters like the production cars had. Walkinshaw had built the cars to the IMSA regulations to allow 14" tyres rather than the regular 12" set. He appealed to the officials, who let the team continue to race subject to a review later. The complication was that the XJ220 was available for sale in the US, so there was the IMSA version could not be compared to a road-version.

In Category 3, the WR was 30 seconds faster than its 1992 version and was easily the fastest in class, qualifying an excellent 17th overall with 3:55.0. The Debora was over 20 seconds back in 26th, and the Lucchini down in 37th (4:33.8). Unsurprisingly, the venerable SHS was well behind the other sports cars (4:24.5, in 30th) and the Ferrari was the slowest of the GTs (4:44.6). The MiG was not a qualifier, as it only achieved a single flying lap in 8 hours of practice. The rubber engine mountings made the drivetrain flex alarmingly and the drivers could never be certain what gear they were selecting. That in turn destroyed the clutch, sending fragments through the engine. The radical Allard never arrived, with the aerodynamic restyling required not being ready in time. It was expected to be a straight fight between Peugeot and Toyota, but when any attrition happened, then the Porsches or Courages may hope for a possible podium.

== Race ==
=== Start ===
The hot sunny weather carried on to the Saturday and a big crowd was on hand. The morning warm-up session had been red-flagged after Irvine had side-swiped Smith in the Ferrari going through the Porsche curves. The Toyota was unscathed but the GT car went backwards into the wall and knocked Smith unconscious. The honorary starter this year was René Monory, President of the French Senate, who had started his working life as a mechanic and was an avid motor-racing fan. From flagfall, Alliot and Irvine duelled at the front, staying very close until lap 8, when Alliot outbraked himself at Mulsanne corner, clouting the curb. Irvine skipped through, and the Toyota led on to the first fuel stops. Baldi swapped in Alliot and resumed the chase, however the Toyota had better road-holding on its softer tyres and Irvine gradually pulled out a 20-second lead.

The first pit-stops for the Category 1 cars came in at lap 10–11, while the turbos of Category 2 would go a couple of laps longer between stops. While the other leading cars changed drivers, Irvine stayed in his car and built a 20-second lead to the next stop. However, a slow stop to change driver let Baldi into the lead, and as Suzuki got up to race-pace, he was able soon open a 30-second lead. Acheson had jumped to third and quickly closed in on his teammate Suzuki, harrying him for the rest of the stint. However, all that good work was undone at 6.30pm when Raphanel brought the 3rd-placed Toyota in with an engine misfire. After a number of stops over the next two hours, it was finally traced to a faulty alternator, but the car had dropped to 35th and lost 20 laps. Troubles then arose for Peugeot at 7pm, when Alliot, having just jumped into the car, came straight back in trailing smoke. An oil connection had been knocked loose in his earlier dalliance at Mulsanne. It cost 35 minutes, 8 laps and dropped them to 15th. His oil issue also affected those following, and both teammate Bouchut and Sekiya, in the Toyota, had to stop to get the oil sprayed up on their windscreens cleaned off.

After all this played out, it was Boutsen's Peugeot in the lead with Geoff Lees in his Toyota closing very quickly. For almost half an hour they sparred, nose-to-tail, weaving through the traffic and thrilling the crowd. It only ended when Boutsen pitted at 7.45pm to hand over to Dalmas. Getting back onto the pace, Sekiya had been running third, but then lost almost two laps in the pits for the most inane of reasons: a loose drinks-bottle, made more difficult with Raphanel's car also getting repaired. At 10pm, as darkness fell at the 6-hour mark, it was the #1 Peugeot and #38 Toyota that were the only cars left on the lead-lap (95). The #3 car was a lap back, running a more conservative race. Irvine was pushing to make up time, running 4th (92). In Category 2, Manuel Reuter, in the Joest Porsche, had led for the first hour, then just after 5pm Martini passed him. The two turbo-Toyotas had now established themselves at the head of Category 2 with the SARD car in 5th (91) ahead of the Trust team (89). Soon after, though, the latter lost time with a puncture. Derek Bell had the lead Courage up in 7th amongst, until worn tyres sent him off at the second chicane, costing 6 laps. The Obermaier Porsche was ahead of the two Joest cars, made easier when "Winter" had to limp back to the pits after almost running out of fuel. Filling out the top-10 was the #13 Courage (87).

In the GT class, Stuck had comfortably led for the first hour in the works Porsche, running 15th overall, until the team lost 20 minutes with a sticking throttle. This left the two remaining Jaguars leading the class ahead of the Toison d'Or Venturi and the Monaco Média Porsche of veteran Jürgen Barth. The third Jaguar was out very early when Hahne brought the car into the pits after only 6 laps, smoking from a blown head gasket, related to an engine-issue in qualifying. Having made back two of the five laps lost, the recovery of the works Porsche back up the field was rudely halted at the six-hour mark. Walter Röhrl was approaching the first chicane when he found he was closing on a slowing Debora far too quickly. Unable to evade in time, he slammed into the back of the car, smashing his radiator and leaving a dump of oil on the track that soon caught out a number of cars following. Röhrl tried to drive back to the pits but without oil, the engine soon seized, marooning him at the Porsche Curves. The WR had a clear lead in Category 3 initially, staying inside the top-20 overall for the first five hours. Then problems with the wheelbearings struck and from a lengthy pitstop, they emerged in 36th. After having its own early delays, the Debora had been running very well and now had a 2-lap lad over the WR.

=== Night ===
As night fell, Lees, Lammers and Fangio were putting in very fast laps and were able to close in on Fabi in the leading Peugeot. However, once again, hard work by the Toyota team was lost just before 11pm. Fangio had just lapped Terada in the Lotus Esprit and was braking for the second chicane when he was thumped from behind by the Lotus which had completed missed its breaking mark. The Toyota was spun around into the tyre barriers but managed to get back to the pits. Fitting new rear bodywork and undertray cost them nearly three-quarters on an hour. Dropping twelve laps, Lees resumed the race in 10th. After its early delays, the remaining Toyota with Irvine at the wheel was still competitive albeit 3 laps down. Alternator problems with the car, however, meant batteries had to be changed regularly through the night stymieing their efforts. Already well down, Andy Wallace brought the third Toyota in, needing a full gearbox change. Although done in just over 30 minutes, it left them over 30 laps behind. So, this left Peugeot with a comfortable margin over their rivals. Through the night Boutsen and his co-drivers held the lead over the junior team car of steady teammates Brabham/Bouchut/Hélary. However, a wake-up call to the changeable nature of Le Mans came at 2.30am when Fabi brought the leading Peugeot into the pit with acrid smoke in the cockpit from faulty wiring. Though fixed in five minutes, they lost the lead to their sister-car, now back on the same lap. The two Peugeots swapped the lead through the rest of the night, depending on the pit strategy, as the young drivers picked up their pace and started pushing harder.

At 3am, David Brabham brought the GT-leading Jaguar into the pits with a fuel leak. Spending 70 minutes getting a new tank fitted, dropping them from 16th to 24th, now 7th in class. Team-mate, Paul Belmondo took over the class lead. chased by a squad of Porsches. Then at 4.40am, Fuchs suffered a repeat of the tyre blowout he had in practice in the Jaguar, and at the same chicane. Despite making it back to the pits and half an hour's repair, the cooling system had been damaged, and when Belmondo took it out again the engine overheated and the car was soon retired. This, in turn, handed the class-lead to the Monaco Média Porsche, which held that position right through Sunday morning.

At the halfway point, the two Peugeots (188 laps) had a 2-lap lead over the hard-charging Irvine (186). The SARD Toyota (182) held a strong fourth. Nagasaka was not up to the speed of his team-mates, so Ratzenberger and Martini did excellent work through the night keeping the car leading Category 2 over the Trust Toyota (179), split by the third Peugeot in 5th. At times, Ratzenberger was lapping as fast as the Peugeots. A lap back was the Obermaier Porsche (178) still had the measure of the two Joest Porsches. In an example of their reliability, only a single prototype had retired – when Alessandro Gini had crashed his Courage out of Indianapolis shortly after midnight, following a high-speed puncture.

=== Morning ===
At 7am Hélary had his rear wing damaged by tyre debris thrown up, losing the lead, then at 8.50am Boutsen lost a lap with a fractured exhaust costing five minutes. Irvine, meanwhile, was driving blisteringly fast, breaking the lap record with a 3:32.2. It was still suffering battery issues but had managed to make back a lap. At 7.45am, Wallace's car came to a stop out at the Dunlop curves at with terminal gearbox problems. The big frustration was that it had only been installed into the car 5 hours earlier, but became the first Category 1 retirement. At 10am, there were still 6 hours to go, the length of many regular endurance races. The Brabham/Hélary/Bouchut Peugeot had done 283 laps and had a lap on their teammates. Irvine was still going rapidly (280) with the other Peugeot in 4th (276). After the long delay the previous evening, Alliot was driving with nothing to lose, as any major issue to the cars in front could get him on the podium. The remaining works Toyota was also charging, with Lees, Lammers and Fangio all putting in triple-stints through the night. It was now back up to sixth (272) between the turbo-Toyotas that were still running like clockwork. The Porsches filled out the top-10, with the Joest car of Reuter/Jelinski/"Winter" had just passed the Obermaier car (268) while Wollek battled a dodgy clutch in the other Joest car (265) ahead of the two remaining Courages. But then at 10.15, what should have been a routine brake and battery change for Sekiya and Irvine cost nine minutes and 2 laps, taking a lot of pressure off Todt and Peugeot. He issued a directive to his leading duo to hold station and no longer race each other, to conserve the engines. It was also the time when the Porsche reliability started cracking. Reuter parked his car at the Esses when the engine packed up. The Kremer cars had not been able to keep up with their fellows, and all three had issues in the morning. Coppelli had pitted on the first lap with soft brakes, but the team had driven back up the field. However, their race ended at breakfast time when Coppelli ran out of fuel then drained the battery trying to get back to the pits. Then Lavaggi had a wheel come off his CK6 in the Porsche curves at speed but did make it back to the pits, while the third car was nursing a faulty clutch and needed a gearbox change. In Category 3, the WR had finally overtaken the Debora around dawn only to be stopped mid-morning for 30 minutes to replace a driveshaft. This left the Debora team now with a 3-lap lead. They were looking good for a class victory until Yvan Muller came to a stop with just 70 minutes to tun – the engine had blown. With attrition, the WR went on to finish 24th overall. The Lucchini, the other car in the class, had constant troubles through the race but persisted and were still running at the finish.

=== Finish and post-race ===
The decisive moment of the race came at 12.04pm, when Sekiya pitted the third-placed Toyota with clutch trouble. It took 34 minutes to change the rear-end and cost them ten laps. Such was the spread of the top cars now that they only dropped a few places to sixth when they resumed. By strange co-incidence, while they were in the pits, Fabi also came in, from second, and lost two laps getting the exhaust repaired. To compound matters for Toyota, Fangio then brought the other car in with a crippled gearbox and that too took 30 minutes to have its rear-end changed. Afterwards, just to prove a point, in the afternoon Irvine blazed a new lap record of 3:27.5 to show what could have been. So, with Toyota's problems, Jean Todt's Peugeots finished a convincing 1–2–3, with Brabham taking the chequered flag as the three cars made a formation finish. In the last hour, the hard driving paid off for Sekiya as he was able to pass the SARD Toyota to take fourth. Ironically, despite the failures, this was Toyota's best race to date, with both the turbo-cars finishing, in 5th and 6th beating their perennial rivals Porsche to take the Category 2 class victory, and the remaining works car in 8th. Seventh was the Obermaier Porsche who had a very reliable race to outlast the bigger Joest and Kremer teams.

Fifteenth across the line was the Jaguar of David Brabham, John Nielsen and David Coulthard. Brabham had spent a lot of his time out of the car with a bag of frozen peas draped around his foot, after the jack had dropped the car onto it in Wednesday practice. After the delay replacing the fuel tank in the night, they had made up the 4-lap margin to the Porsches to retake the class-lead by midday. Sir Jack Brabham was on hand to see two of his sons on top of the podium for their classes. However, it had raced under waiver due to the scrutineering issue with the lack of catalytic converters (although no other GT cars used them, nor the racing-spec version of the Jaguar). A month later, they were disqualified on a technicality - Jaguar's evidence and appeal had been filed correctly with the ACO, but not on time with the French motorsport authority (FFSA). Conspiracy theories abounded as the GT win therefore went to the Porsche 911 of the French Monaco Média team of Jean-Paul Jarier that had finished 2 laps behind. Sixteen years after winning the race outright with Jacky Ickx and Hurley Haywood, Jürgen Barth signed off his career with another class win. Prepared by Larbre Compétition, its stablemate co-driven by team owner Jack Leconte, was the third GT home. The 30 classified finishers equalled the record for the greatest number of finishers, set at the very first race in 1923

This was the first time since the Porsche works team in 1982 that a single team had done a clean sweep of the podium. and the 1st time for a French marque to do it since Lorraine-Dietrich in 1926. It was also the first time that two rookie drivers have won the race since the inaugural 1923 race. With no other races for the Group C cars this year, it was a suitable finale for the Peugeot team as it was folded, to concentrate on moving into Formula 1. Todt was leaving to reinvigorate the Scuderia Ferrari F1 team. Back in Japan, blame was laid with the engineering department. A month later, Toyota bought out Anderson Motor Sports, running its rally cars, and set up Toyota Motorsport GmbH in Cologne for a European racing programme

This was still the time when top-class single-seat drivers would do endurance racing, and a few of the Le Mans entrants were moving into Formula 1: Eddie Irvine started his F1 career with Jordan at the end of the year. In 1994, Paul Belmondo joined Pacific Racing while David Brabham and Roland Ratzenberger were in the new Simtek team which ended terribly, with the fatal accident to the Austrian at the ill-fated San Marino Grand Prix that also saw the death of Ayrton Senna. David Coulthard, latterly the Williams test driver, stepped up as the replacement for Senna. The seven Venturi 500LM supercars, coming out of the French one-make race series had not been on the pace with the Porsche 911s or Jaguars, but five of them finished proving their reliability. Jürgen Barth's German Porsche series joined Patrick Peter and Stéphane Ratel's Venturi series in 1994 to create the BPR Global GT Series (named for their surname initials) – becoming the only major international sports car series running that year, piquing FISA's interest. There was high anticipation on the upcoming GT rules, with a number of supercar manufacturers eligible and potentially interested, with an equivalency formula to provide close racing and a degree of parity with the prototypes. Being drafted by FISA in consultation with the ACO, IMSA and the Japanese association, there was hope for a brave new world for endurance motor-racing.

== Official results ==
=== Finishers ===
Results taken from Quentin Spurring's book, officially licensed by the ACO
Class Winners are in Bold text.

Pos	Class	No.	Team	Drivers	Chassis	Engine	Tyre	Laps
1	**Category 1**	**3**	**(France) Peugeot Talbot Sport**	**(Australia) Geoff Brabham** **(France) Éric Hélary** **(France) Christophe Bouchut**	Peugeot 905 Evo 1C	Peugeot SA35-A2 3.5L V10	MI	375
2	Category 1	1	(France) Peugeot Talbot Sport	(Belgium) Thierry Boutsen (France) Yannick Dalmas (Italy) Teo Fabi	Peugeot 905 Evo 1C	Peugeot SA35 3.5L V10	MI	374
3	Category 1	2	(France) Peugeot Talbot Sport	(Italy) Mauro Baldi (France) Philippe Alliot (France) Jean-Pierre Jabouille	Peugeot 905 Evo 1C	Peugeot SA35 3.5L V10	MI	367
4	Category 1	36	Toyota Team TOM'S Japan	(United Kingdom) Eddie Irvine (Japan) Toshio Suzuki (Japan) Masanori Sekiya	Toyota TS010	Toyota RV10 3.5L V10	MI	364
5	**Category 2**	**22**	**(Japan) SARD Co.**	**(Austria) Roland Ratzenberger** **(Italy) Mauro Martini** **(Japan) Naoki Nagasaka**	Toyota 93C-V	Toyota R36V 3.6L V8 twin-turbo	D	363
6	Category 2	25	(Japan) Trust Racing Team	(South Africa) George Fouché (Sweden) Eje Elgh (Sweden) Steven Andskär	Toyota 93C-V	Toyota R36V 3.6L V8 twin-turbo	D	358
7	Category 2	21	(West Germany) Obermaier Racing	(West Germany) Otto Altenbach (West Germany) Jürgen Oppermann (Switzerland) Loris Kessel	Porsche 962C	Porsche 935 3.0L F6 twin turbo	G	355
8	Category 1	38	(Japan) / (United Kingdom) Toyota Team TOM'S GB	(United Kingdom) Geoff Lees (Netherlands) Jan Lammers (Argentina) Juan Manuel Fangio II	Toyota TS010	Toyota RV10 3.5L V10	MI	353
9	Category 2	18	(West Germany) Joest Porsche Racing	(France) Bob Wollek (France) Henri Pescarolo (West Germany) / (United States) Ronny Meixner	Porsche 962C	Porsche 935/83 3.0L F6 twin turbo	G	351
10	Category 2	14	(France) Courage Compétition	(United Kingdom) Derek Bell (France) Lionel Robert (France) Pascal Fabre	Courage C30LM	Porsche 935/76 3.0L F6 twin turbo	G	347
11	Category 2	13	(France) Courage Compétition	(France) Pierre Yver (France) Jean-Louis Ricci (France) Jean-François Yvon	Courage C30LM	Porsche 935/76 3.0L F6 twin turbo	G	343
12	Category 2	10	(West Germany) Porsche Kremer Racing	(West Germany) Jürgen Lässig (Italy) Giovanni Lavaggi (South Africa) Wayne Taylor	Porsche 962C-K6	Porsche 935 3.0L F6 twin turbo	D	328
13	Category 2	11	(West Germany) Porsche Kremer Racing	(France) François Migault (United States) Andy Evans (Spain) Tomás Saldaña	Porsche 962C-K6	Porsche 935 3.0L F6 twin turbo	D	316
14	Category 2	23	(France) Team Guy Chotard (private entrant)	(France) Denis Morin (France) Didier Caradec (France) Alain Sturm	Porsche 962C	Porsche 935/76 3.0L F6 twin turbo	G	308
15	**Category 4**	**47**	**(France) Monaco Média International** **(France) Larbre Compétition**	**(West Germany) Jürgen Barth** **(France) Joël Gouhier** **(France) Dominique Dupuy**	Porsche 911 Carrera RSR	Porsche M64 3.8L F6	P	304
16	Category 4	78	(France) Larbre Compétition	(France) Jack Leconte (Spain) Jesús Pareja (France) Pierre de Thoisy	Porsche 911 Carrera RSR	Porsche M64 3.8L F6	G	301
17	Category 4	65	(West Germany) Heico Dienstleistungen (private entrant)	(West Germany) Ulrich Richter (West Germany) Dirk Rainer Ebeling (West Germany) Karl-Heinz Wlazik	Porsche 911 Carrera RSR	Porsche M64 3.8L F6	Y	299
18	Category 4	77	(Switzerland) Scuderia Chicco d'Oro (private entrant)	(Switzerland) Claude Haldi (Switzerland) Olivier Haberthur (Switzerland) Charles Margueron	Porsche 911 Carrera RSR	Porsche M64 3.8L F6	P	299
19	Category 4	62	(Austria) Konrad Motorsport	(Austria) Franz Konrad (Japan) Jun Harada (Brazil) Antônio de Azevedo Hermann	Porsche 911 Carrera RSR	Porsche M64 3.8L F6	Y	293
20	Category 2	24	(France) Graff Racing	(France) Jean-Bernard Bouvet (France) Richard Balandras (France) Bruno Miot	Spice SE89C	Cosworth DFL 3.3 L V8	G	288
21	Category 4	66	(West Germany) Muhlbauer Motorsport (private entrant)	(West Germany) Gustl Spreng (Switzerland) Sandro Angelastri (West Germany) Fritz Müller	Porsche 911 Carrera RS	Porsche M64 3.6L F6	P	276
22	Category 4	40	(West Germany) Obermaier Racing	(Belgium) Philippe Olczyk (West Germany) Josef Prechtl (France) Gérard Dillmann	Porsche 911 Carrera RSR	Porsche M64 3.8L F6	P	274
23	Category 4	55	(Italy) R. Agusta (private entrant)	(Italy) Riccardo Agusta (Italy) Onofrio Russo (Italy) Paolo Mondini	Venturi 500LM	Renault PRV 3.0L V6 twin turbo	D	274
24	**Category 3**	**33**	**(France) Welter Racing**	**(France) Patrick Gonin** **(Switzerland) Bernard Santal** **(France) Alain Lamouille**	WR LM92/93	Peugeot 405T16 2.0L S4 turbo	MI	268
25	Category 4	57	(Belgium) Toison d'Or (private entrant)	(Belgium) Marc Duez (Belgium) Éric Bachelart (Belgium) Philip Verellen	Venturi 500LM	Renault PRV 3.0L V6 twin turbo	D	267
26	Category 4	49	(Belgium) Team Paduwa	(France) Bruno Ilien (France) Alain Gadal (France) Bernard Robin	Porsche 911 Carrera 2 Cup	Porsche M64 3.6L F6	D	266
27	Category 4	70	(France) É. Graham (private entrant)	(Belgium) Pascal Witmeur (Belgium) Michel Neugarten (France) Jacques Tropenat	Venturi 500LM	Renault PRV 3.0L V6 twin turbo	D	262
28	Category 4	91	(France) A. Lamouille (private entrant)	(France) Patrice Roussel (France) Édouard Sezionale (France) Hervé Rohée	Venturi 500LM	Renault PRV 3.0L V6 twin turbo	D	246
29	Category 4	92	(France) BBA Compétition (private entrant)	(France) Jean-Luc Maury-Laribière (France) Michel Krine (France) Patrick Camus	Venturi 500LM	Renault PRV 3.0L V6 twin turbo	D	243
30	Category 3	35	(Italy) Sport & Imagine SRL (private entrant)	(Italy) Fabio Magnani (Italy) Luigi Taverna (Italy) Roberto Ragazzi	Lucchini SP91	Alfa Romeo 164QF 3.0L V6	P	221

=== Did not finish ===
Pos	Class	No	Team	Drivers	Chassis	Engine	Tyre	Laps	Reason
DSQ	Category 4	50	(United Kingdom) TWR Jaguar Racing	(Denmark) John Nielsen (Australia) David Brabham (United Kingdom) David Coulthard	Jaguar XJ220C	Jaguar JRV-6 3.5 L V6 twin turbo	D	306	illegal exhaust (post-race)
DNF	Category 2	17	(West Germany) Joest Porsche Racing	(West Germany) Manuel Reuter (West Germany) Frank Jelinski (West Germany) "John Winter" (Louis Krages)	Porsche 962C	Porsche 935/83 3.0L F6 twin turbo	G	282	Engine (20hr)
DNF	Category 3	34	(France) Didier Bonnet Racing (private entrant)	(France) Yvan Muller (France) Gérard Tremblay (France) Georges Tessier	Debora SP93	Alfa Romeo 164QF 3.0L V6	P	259	Engine (24hr)
DNF	Category 1	37	Toyota Team TOM'S Japan	(United Kingdom) Kenny Acheson (United Kingdom) Andy Wallace (France) Pierre-Henri Raphanel	Toyota TS010	Toyota RV10 3.5L V10	MI	212	Gearbox (16hr)
DNF	Category 4	71	(France) Jacadi Racing	(France) Jacques Laffite (France) Michel Maisonneuve (France) Christophe Dechavanne	Venturi 500LM	Renault PRV 3.0L V6 twin turbo	D	210	Engine (21hr)
DNF	Category 2	15	(West Germany) Porsche Kremer Racing	(Italy) Almo Coppelli (United Kingdom) Robin Donovan (United States) Steve Fossett	Porsche 962C-K6	Porsche 935 3.0L F6 twin turbo	D	204	Out of fuel (17hr)
DNF	Category 4	52	(United Kingdom) TWR Jaguar Racing	(France) Paul Belmondo (United States) Jay Cochran (West Germany) Andreas Fuchs	Jaguar XJ220C	Jaguar JRV-6 3.5L V6 twin turbo	D	176	Engine (15hr)
DNF	Category 2	28	(France) R. Bassaler (private entrant)	(France) Roland Bassaler (France) Patrick Bourdais (France) Jean-Louis Capette	Sauber SHS C6	BMW M88 3.5L S6	G	166	Accident (17hr)
DNF	Category 4	44	(United Kingdom) Lotus Sport (United Kingdom) Chamberlain Engineering	(United Kingdom) Richard Piper (United States) Olindo Iacobelli (France) Ferdinand de Lesseps	Lotus Esprit Sport 300	Lotus 2.2L S4 turbo	D	162	Engine (16hr)
DNF	Category 2	27	(United Kingdom) Chamberlain Engineering	(United Kingdom) Nick Adams (Belgium) Hervé Regout (United States) Andy Petery	Spice SE89C	Cosworth DFZ 3.5L V8	G	137	Engine (16hr)
DNF	Category 2	12	(France) Courage Compétition	(Japan) Tomiko Yoshikawa (El Salvador) Carlos Moran (Italy) Alessandro Gini	Courage C30LM	Porsche 935/76 3.0L F6 twin turbo	G	108	Accident (10hr)
DNF	Category 4	45	(United Kingdom) Lotus Sport (United Kingdom) Chamberlain Engineering	(United Kingdom) Peter Hardman (Denmark) Thorkild Thyrring (Japan) Yojiro Terada	Lotus Esprit Sport 300	Lotus 2.2L S4 turbo	D	92	Engine (10hr)
DNF	Category 4	56	(France) S. Ratel (private entrant)	(Greece) Costas Los (United States) Johannes Badrutt (France) Claude Brana	Venturi 500LM	Renault PRV 3.0L V6 twin turbo	D	80	Accident (10hr)
DNF	Category 4	46	(West Germany) Le Mans Porsche Team	(West Germany) Hans-Joachim Stuck (United States) Hurley Haywood (West Germany) Walter Röhrl	Porsche 911 Turbo S LM	Porsche M64 3.2L F6 twin turbo	G	79	Accident damage (7hr)
DNF	Category 4	76	(Switzerland) Cartronic Motorsport	(Switzerland) Enzo Calderari (Italy) Luigino Pagotto (Switzerland) Lilian Bryner	Porsche 911 Carrera 2 Cup	Porsche M64 3.6L F6	P	64	Accident (7hr)
DNF	Category 4	48	(Belgium) Team Paduwa	(West Germany) Harald Grohs (Belgium) Didier Theys (Belgium) Jean-Paul Libert	Porsche 911 Carrera 2 Cup	Porsche M64 3.6L F6	D	8	Accident damage (2hr)
DNF	Category 4	51	(United Kingdom) TWR Jaguar Racing	(West Germany) Armin Hahne (United Kingdom) Win Percy (United Kingdom) David Leslie	Jaguar XJ220C	Jaguar JRV-6 3.5L V6 twin turbo	D	6	Engine (2hr)

=== Did not start ===
Pos	Class	No	Team	Drivers	Chassis	Engine	Tyre	Reason
DNS	Category 4	72	(United Kingdom) Simpson Engineering (private entrant)	(United Kingdom) Robin Smith (Italy) "Stingbrace" (Stefano Sebastiani) (Japan) Tetsuya Ota	Ferrari 348 LM	Ferrari Tipo F119 3.4L V8	**P**	Accident in warm-up
DNS	Category 4	41	(West Germany) Obermaier Racing	(Italy) Ruggero Grassi (Italy) Sergio Brambilla (Italy) Renato Mastropietro	Porsche 964 Carrera 2 Cup	Porsche M64 3.6L F6	**P**	Accident in practice
DNQ	Category 4	99	(Georgia (country)) Georgia Automotive MiG Tako	(Italy) Giampiero Consonni (United States) Pierre Honegger (France) Philippe Renault	MiG M100	Motori Moderni 3.5L V12 twin turbo	**P**	Did not qualify
DNA	Category 1	7	(France) J.-L. Ricci (private entrant)	(France) Jean-Louis Ricci (United Kingdom) Robert "Robs" Lamplough (France) Olivier Leclére (France) Jean-François Véroux	Allard Motor Company J2X	Cosworth DFR 3.5L V8		Did not arrive
DNA	Category 2	26	(United Kingdom) GP Motorsport		Spice SE90C	Cosworth DFZ 3.5L V8		Did not arrive
DNA	Category 4	58	(West Germany) Roock Racing International	(Switzerland) Bruno Eichmann	Porsche 911 Carrera RSR	Porsche M64 3.8L F6		Did not arrive
DNA	Category 4	59	(West Germany) Roock Racing International	(Netherlands) Mike Hezemans	Porsche 911 Carrera RSR	Porsche M64 3.8L F6		Did not arrive
DNA	Category 4	63	(United States) Ed Arnold Racing (private entrant)		BMW M5 E34	BMW S38B36 3.5L S6		Did not arrive
DNA	Category 4	67	(West Germany) FAR Derkaum (private entrant)	(France) Bruno Ilien (West Germany) Hans Dorr (West Germany) Gunter Döbler (West Germany) Marcus Menden	Porsche 964 Carrera 2 Cup	Porsche M64 3.6L F6		Did not arrive
DNA	Category 4	74	(Canada) J. Graham (private entrant)		Ford Mustang	Ford Essex 3.8L V6		Did not arrive
DNA	Category 4	75	(United Kingdom) B. Jankel (private entrant)		Chevrolet Corvette C4	Chevrolet 3.7L V8 supercharged		Did not arrive

=== Class winners ===
Class	Winning car	Winning drivers
Category 1	#3 Peugeot 905 Evo 1C	G. Brabham / Hélary / Bouchut
Category 2	#22 Toyota 93C-V	Ratzenberger / Martini / Nagasaka
Category 3	#33 WR LM92/3	Gonin / Santal / Lamouille
Category 4	#47 Porsche 911 Carrera RSR	Barth / Gouhier / Dupuy
Note *: setting a new class distance record for the circuit.

=== Statistics ===
Taken from Quentin Spurring's book, officially licensed by the ACO

- Pole Position – P. Alliot, #2 Peugeot 905 Evo 1C - 3:24.9secs; 238.9 km/h (148.4 mph)
- Fastest Lap – E. Irvine, #36 Toyota TS010 - 3:27.5secs; 236.0 km/h (146.6 mph)
- Winning Distance – 5,100.00 km (3,168.99 mi)
- Winner's Average Speed – 213.4 km/h (132.6 mph)
- Attendance – 110,000
