= Ferdinand de Lesseps (racing driver) =

French former racing driver (born 1957)

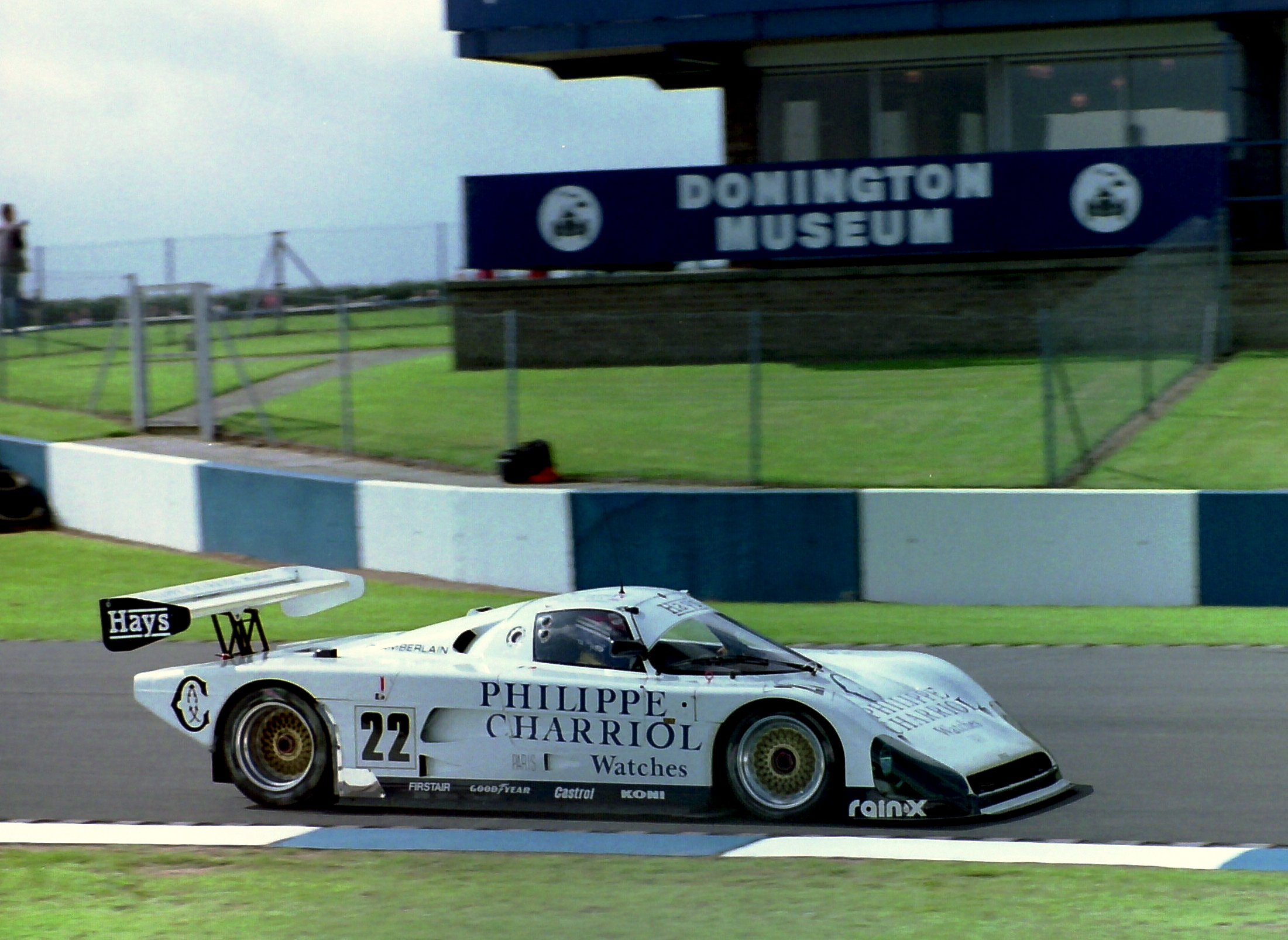
- de Lesseps in 1992
- Nationality: French
- Born: Ferdinand-Noël Jacques Marie de Lesseps; 25 June 1957 (age 69) Boulogne-Billancourt, France
- Relatives: Ferdinand de Lesseps (Grandfather)

Previous series
- 1982 1983–1984 1984 1985–1986 1986–1988 1987 1989–1990, 1994 1991–1992 1991–1992 1994–1995 1995–1997 1997–1998 1999 2000 2000: Championnat de France Formule Renault Turbo; French Formula Three Championship; German Formula Three Championship; Europa Cup Renault Alpine V6 Turbo; European Touring Car Championship; World Touring Car Championship; IMSA GT Championship; World Sportscar Championship; Porsche Carrera Cup France; BPR Global GT Series; Lamborghini Diablo Trophy; French GT Championship; Belgian Procar Championship; Grand American Road Racing Championship; FIA GT Championship

Championship titles
- 1996 1992: Lamborghini Diablo Trophy; World Sportscar Championship – FIA Cup
24 Hours of Le Mans career
- Years: 1990 – 1993, 1995
- Teams: Pierre-Alain Lombardi; Chamberlain Engineering; Euro Racing; Lotus Sport; Éric Graham
- Best finish: 7th (1992)
- Class wins: 0

Ferdinand-Noël Jacques Marie de Lesseps (born 25 June 1957) is a French photographer and former racing driver. He was the FIA Cup champion in the final season of the World Sportscar Championship. de Lesseps was also the inaugural Lamborghini Diablo Trophy winner in 1996.

== Racing record ==
=== Racing career summary ===
Season	Series	Team	Races	Wins	Poles	F/Laps	Podiums	Points	Position
1982	Championnat de France Formule Renault Turbo		10	0	0	0	0	?	22nd
1983	French Formula Three Championship		9	0	0	0	0	?	10th
1984	French Formula Three Championship		8	0	0	0	0	?	11th
1984	German Formula Three Championship	J Carmignon	1	0	0	0	0	0	NC
1985	Europa Cup Renault Alpine V6 Turbo		?	?	?	?	?	?	8th
1986	European Touring Car Championship		6	0	0	0	0	?	?
1986	Europa Cup Renault Alpine V6 Turbo		?	?	?	?	?	?	13th
1987	World Touring Car Championship	Garage du Bac	2	0	0	0	0	?	?
1987	World Touring Car Championship	Luigi	1	0	0	0	0	?	?
1987	European Touring Car Championship – Division 2		3	0	0	0	0	?	?
1988	European Touring Car Championship – Division 2		2	0	0	0	0	?	?
1989	IMSA GT Championship – GTO	Lion Rampant Racing	1	0	0	0	0	?	?
1989	IMSA GT Championship – Lights	Whitehall Motorsports	8	0	0	0	1	?	12th
1989	IMSA GT Championship – Lights	Essex Racing	4	0	0	0	1	?	12th
1990	IMSA GT Championship – Lights	Essex Racing	5	0	0	0	0	?	21st
1990	24 Hours of Le Mans – C2	Pierre-Alain Lombardi	1	0	0	0	0	N/A	DNF
1991	Sportscar World Championship	Chamberlain Engineering; Euro Racing	1	0	0	0	0	0	NC
1991	24 Hours of Le Mans – C1	Chamberlain Engineering; Euro Racing	1	0	0	0	0	N/A	DNF
1991	Porsche Carrera Cup France		7	0	0	0	0	?	22nd
1992	World Sportscar Championship	Chamberlain Engineering	6	0	0	0	2	34	5th
1992	World Sportscar Championship – FIA Cup	Chamberlain Engineering	6	6	2	1	6	100	**1st**
1992	24 Hours of Le Mans – C1	Chamberlain Engineering	1	0	0	0	0	N/A	7th
1992	Porsche Carrera Cup France		3	0	0	0	0	?	20th
1993	24 Hours of Le Mans – GT	Chamberlain Engineering; Lotus Sport	1	0	0	0	0	N/A	DNF
1994	BPR Global GT Series	BBA Compétition	7	0	0	0	0	N/A	N/A
1994	IMSA GT Championship – GTU	Team Gunnar	1	0	0	0	0	0	NC
1994	24 Hours of Spa	Team Honda Challenge	1	0	0	0	0	N/A	DNF
1995	BPR Global GT Series	Konrad Motorsport	1	0	0	0	0	?	33rd
1995	BPR Global GT Series	Pilot Aldix Racing	1	0	0	0	0	?	33rd
1995	BPR Global GT Series	Elf Haberthur Racing	7	0	0	0	0	?	33rd
1995	24 Hours of Le Mans – GT1	Éric Graham	1	0	0	0	0	N/A	DNF
1995	SuperSport Trophy		3	?	?	?	3	?	?
1996	BPR Global GT Series	Elf Haberthur Racing	7	0	0	0	0	?	44th
1996	BPR Global GT Series	Marcos Racing International	?	3	0	0	0	?	44th
1996	Lamborghini Diablo Trophy	Haberthur	?	?	?	?	?	?	**1st**
1997	French GT Championship	Elf Haberthur Racing	5	0	0	0	2	?	11th
1997	Lamborghini Diablo Trophy		?	1	?	?	?	?	?
1999	French GT Championship	Auto Vitesse	8	2	1	0	2	?	26th
1999	Belgian Procar Championship		1	0	0	0	0	?	67th
2000	Grand American Road Racing Championship – GTU	Brumos Racing	1	0	0	0	0	0	NC
2000	FIA GT Championship – N-GT	Larbre Compétition Chereau	9	0	0	0	1	17	11th

=== Complete 24 Hours of Le Mans results ===
Year	Team	Co-Drivers	Car	Class	Laps	Pos.	Class Pos.
1990	(Switzerland) Pierre-Alain Lombardi	(Switzerland) Pierre-Alain Lombardi (France) Denis Morin	Spice SE87C-Cosworth	C2	170	DNF	DNF
1991	(United Kingdom) Chamberlain Engineering (Netherlands) Euro Racing	(United Kingdom) Charles Rickett (United Kingdom) John Sheldon	Spice SE89C-Cosworth	C1	85	DNF	DNF
1992	(United Kingdom) Chamberlain Engineering (Netherlands) Euro Racing	(France) Olindo Iacobelli (United Kingdom) Richard Piper	Spice SE89C-Cosworth	C1	258	14th	7th
1993	(United Kingdom) Chamberlain Engineering (United Kingdom) Lotus Sport	(United States) Olindo Iacobelli (United Kingdom) Richard Piper	Lotus Esprit Sport 300	GT	162	DNF	DNF
1995	(France) Éric Graham	(France) François Birbeau (France) Éric Graham	Venturi 600 LM	GT1	178	DNF	DNF

=== Complete World Sportscar Championship results ===
(key) (Races in bold indicate pole position; results in italics indicate fastest lap)

Year	Entrant	Class	Chassis	Engine	1	2	3	4	5	6	7	8	Pos.	Points
1991	Chamberlain Engineering Euro Racing	C1	Spice SE89C	Cosworth DFZ 3.5 L V8	SUZ	MNZ	SIL	LMS; Ret	NÜR	MAG	MEX	AUT	0	NC
1992	Chamberlain Engineering	FIA Cup	Spice SE89C	Cosworth DFZ 3.5 L V8	MNZ; 1	SIL; 1	LMS; 1	DON; 1	SUZ (Note: Chamberlain Engineering was the only FIA Cup entrant participating in the race, so no points were awarded.); 1	MAG; 1			100	1st

=== Complete FIA GT Championship results ===
(key) (Races in bold indicate pole position) (Races in italics indicate fastest lap)

Year	Team	Car	Class	1	2	3	4	5	6	7	8	9	10	Pos.	Pts
2000	Larbre Compétition Chéreau	Porsche 911 GT3-R	N-GT	VAL; 4	EST; 7	MNZ; 5	SIL; 5	HUN	ZOL; 5	A1R; 4	LAU; 6	BRN; 3	MAG; 9	11th	17
