= 1994 BPR Global GT Series =

Inaugural season of BPR Global GT Series

Seasons
- ← none 1995 →

The 1994 BPR International GT Endurance Series was the inaugural season of BPR Global GT Series. It was a series for Grand Touring style cars broken into four classes based on power and manufacturer involvement, using the names GT1 through GT4. It began on 6 March 1994 and ended 13 November 1994 after 8 races, although no championships were held over the course of the season, each race was an independent event.

== Schedule ==
1994 BPR International GT Endurance Series Calendar
Rnd	Race	Circuit	Date
1	4 Hours of Paul Ricard	(France) Circuit Paul Ricard	6 March
2	Gran Premio Repsol GT Resistencia	(Spain) Circuito Permanente Del Jarama	10 April
3	4 Hours of Dijon	(France) Dijon-Prenois	1 May
4	1000 km de Paris	(France) Autodrome de Linas-Montlhéry	29 May
5	4 Ore di Vallelunga	(Italy) Autodromo Vallelunga	10 July
6	4 Hours of Spa	(Belgium) Circuit de Spa-Francorchamps	22 July
7	POKKA Suzuka 1000	(Japan) Suzuka Circuit	28 August
8	Mobil Lakewood International Race '94	(China) Zhuhai Street Circuit	13 November

== Entries ==
=== GT1 ===
Entrant	Car	Engine	Tyre	No.	Drivers	Rounds
(Germany) Seikel Motorsport	Porsche 968 Turbo RS	Porsche 3.0 L Turbo I4		1	(Denmark) John Nielsen	3
(Germany) Seikel Motorsport	Porsche 968 Turbo RS	Porsche 3.0 L Turbo I4		1	(Germany) Thomas Bscher	3
(Germany) Weiland	Porsche 911 Carrera RSR	Porsche 3.8 L Flat-6		9	(Germany) Harald Weiland	6
(Germany) Weiland	Porsche 911 Carrera RSR	Porsche 3.8 L Flat-6		9	(Germany) Mathias Weiland	6
(Germany) Obermaier Racing	Porsche 911 Bi-Turbo	Porsche 3.6 L Turbo Flat-6	Y	11	(Germany) Jürgen Lässig	6
(Germany) Obermaier Racing	Porsche 911 Bi-Turbo	Porsche 3.6 L Turbo Flat-6	Y	11	(Germany) Jürgen von Gartzen	6
(Germany) Obermaier Racing	Porsche 911 Bi-Turbo	Porsche 3.6 L Turbo Flat-6	Y	12	(Germany) Otto Altenbach	4, 6
(Germany) Obermaier Racing	Porsche 911 Bi-Turbo	Porsche 3.6 L Turbo Flat-6	Y	12	(Germany) Friedrich Leinemann	4, 6
(Japan) Hunter Racing Team	Porsche 911 Bi-Turbo	Porsche 3.6 L Turbo Flat-6		11	(Japan) Takao Wada	7
(Japan) Hunter Racing Team	Porsche 911 Bi-Turbo	Porsche 3.6 L Turbo Flat-6		11	(Japan) Hiroaki Sano	7
(Japan) West Corvette Racing Team	Chevrolet Corvette Protofab	Chevrolet 6.5 L V8	G	18	(Japan) Kaoru Hoshino	7
(Japan) West Corvette Racing Team	Chevrolet Corvette Protofab	Chevrolet 6.5 L V8	G	18	(Japan) Hideo Fukuyama	7
(Sweden) Strandell	Ferrari F40 GTE	Ferrari F120B 3.0 L Turbo V8	P	40	(Sweden) Anders Olofsson	2–7
(Sweden) Strandell	Ferrari F40 GTE	Ferrari F120B 3.0 L Turbo V8	P	40	(Italy) Luciano Della Noce	2–7
(Sweden) Strandell	Ferrari F40 GTE	Ferrari F120B 3.0 L Turbo V8	P	40	(Japan) Tomiko Yoshikawa	7
(Germany) Konrad Motorsport	Porsche 911 Bi-Turbo	Porsche 3.6 L Turbo Flat-6	P	42; 41	(Austria) Franz Konrad	2–8
(Germany) Konrad Motorsport	Porsche 911 Bi-Turbo	Porsche 3.6 L Turbo Flat-6	P	42; 41	(Germany) Bernd Netzeband	2
(Germany) Konrad Motorsport	Porsche 911 Bi-Turbo	Porsche 3.6 L Turbo Flat-6	P	42; 41	(Netherlands) Cor Euser	3, 7
(Germany) Konrad Motorsport	Porsche 911 Bi-Turbo	Porsche 3.6 L Turbo Flat-6	P	42; 41	(France) Alex de Lesseps	4
(Germany) Konrad Motorsport	Porsche 911 Bi-Turbo	Porsche 3.6 L Turbo Flat-6	P	42; 41	(Germany) Helmuth Steinbrecher	4
(Germany) Konrad Motorsport	Porsche 911 Bi-Turbo	Porsche 3.6 L Turbo Flat-6	P	42; 41	(United States) Robert Peacock	4
(Germany) Konrad Motorsport	Porsche 911 Bi-Turbo	Porsche 3.6 L Turbo Flat-6	P	42; 41	(Austria) Frank Schmickler	5
(Germany) Konrad Motorsport	Porsche 911 Bi-Turbo	Porsche 3.6 L Turbo Flat-6	P	42; 41	(Brazil) Antônio Hermann	6–7
(Germany) Konrad Motorsport	Porsche 911 Bi-Turbo	Porsche 3.6 L Turbo Flat-6	P	42; 41	(United Kingdom) Tiff Needell	8
(France) JCB Racing	Venturi 600 LM	Renault PRV 3.0 L Turbo V6	D	43	(France) Jean-Claude Basso	4–5, 7–8
(France) JCB Racing	Venturi 600 LM	Renault PRV 3.0 L Turbo V6	D	43	(France) Henri Pescarolo	4
(France) JCB Racing	Venturi 600 LM	Renault PRV 3.0 L Turbo V6	D	43	(Italy) Almo Coppelli	5
(France) JCB Racing	Venturi 600 LM	Renault PRV 3.0 L Turbo V6	D	43	(France) Stéphane Ratel	7
(France) JCB Racing	Venturi 600 LM	Renault PRV 3.0 L Turbo V6	D	43	(Belgium) Eric de Doncker	7
(France) JCB Racing	Venturi 600 LM	Renault PRV 3.0 L Turbo V6	D	43	(France) François Migault	8
(Germany) Freisinger Motorsport	Porsche 911 Bi-Turbo; Porsche 911 Carrera RSR	Porsche 3.6 L Turbo Flat-6; Porsche 3.8 L Flat-6	G	44; 45	(Germany) Michael Irmgratz	1–4
(Germany) Freisinger Motorsport	Porsche 911 Bi-Turbo; Porsche 911 Carrera RSR	Porsche 3.6 L Turbo Flat-6; Porsche 3.8 L Flat-6	G	44; 45	(Germany) Edgar Dören	1–2
(Germany) Freisinger Motorsport	Porsche 911 Bi-Turbo; Porsche 911 Carrera RSR	Porsche 3.6 L Turbo Flat-6; Porsche 3.8 L Flat-6	G	44; 45	(Italy) Luigino Pagotto	2, 5
(Germany) Freisinger Motorsport	Porsche 911 Bi-Turbo; Porsche 911 Carrera RSR	Porsche 3.6 L Turbo Flat-6; Porsche 3.8 L Flat-6	G	44; 45	(Germany) Wolfgang Kaufmann	3–4
(Germany) Freisinger Motorsport	Porsche 911 Bi-Turbo; Porsche 911 Carrera RSR	Porsche 3.6 L Turbo Flat-6; Porsche 3.8 L Flat-6	G	44; 45	(France) Jean-Louis Ricci	4
(Germany) Freisinger Motorsport	Porsche 911 Bi-Turbo; Porsche 911 Carrera RSR	Porsche 3.6 L Turbo Flat-6; Porsche 3.8 L Flat-6	G	44; 45	(Italy) Gualtiero Giribaldi	5
(Germany) Freisinger Motorsport	Porsche 911 Bi-Turbo; Porsche 911 Carrera RSR	Porsche 3.6 L Turbo Flat-6; Porsche 3.8 L Flat-6	G	50	(Germany) Michael Irmgatz	5–6
(Germany) Freisinger Motorsport	Porsche 911 Bi-Turbo; Porsche 911 Carrera RSR	Porsche 3.6 L Turbo Flat-6; Porsche 3.8 L Flat-6	G	50	(Germany) Wolfgang Kaufmann	5, 7–8
(Germany) Freisinger Motorsport	Porsche 911 Bi-Turbo; Porsche 911 Carrera RSR	Porsche 3.6 L Turbo Flat-6; Porsche 3.8 L Flat-6	G	50	(France) Jean-Louis Ricci	6
(Germany) Freisinger Motorsport	Porsche 911 Bi-Turbo; Porsche 911 Carrera RSR	Porsche 3.6 L Turbo Flat-6; Porsche 3.8 L Flat-6	G	50	(France) Michel Ligonnet	7
(Germany) Freisinger Motorsport	Porsche 911 Bi-Turbo; Porsche 911 Carrera RSR	Porsche 3.6 L Turbo Flat-6; Porsche 3.8 L Flat-6	G	50	(Japan) Syunji Kasuya	8
(France) Promo Racing	Venturi 600 LM	Renault PRV 3.0 L Turbo V6		44	(France) Éric Graham	5–8
(France) Promo Racing	Venturi 600 LM	Renault PRV 3.0 L Turbo V6		44	(France) François Birbeau	5–8
(France) Promo Racing	Venturi 600 LM	Renault PRV 3.0 L Turbo V6		44	(Switzerland) Laurent Lécuyer	5–7
(United States) Les Lindley	Ford Mustang GTO	Ford V8	G	48	(United States) Les Lindley	7
(United States) Les Lindley	Ford Mustang GTO	Ford V8	G	48	(United States) Ken Bupp	7
(United States) Les Lindley	Ford Mustang GTO	Ford V8	G	48	(United States) Bill Auberlen	7
(France) Crisal Compétition	Porsche 911 Carrera RSR	Porsche 3.8 L Flat-6		52	(France) Michel Cottot	7
(France) Crisal Compétition	Porsche 911 Carrera RSR	Porsche 3.8 L Flat-6		52	(France) Thiérry Guiod	7
(France) Crisal Compétition	Porsche 911 Carrera RSR	Porsche 3.8 L Flat-6		52	(France) Jérôme Brarda	7
(Italy) Agusta Racing Team	Ferrari F40 GT	Ferrari F120B 3.0 L Turbo V8		3	(Spain) Fernando Moller	5–6
(Italy) Agusta Racing Team	Ferrari F40 GT	Ferrari F120B 3.0 L Turbo V8		3	(Spain) Antonio Puig	5
(Italy) Agusta Racing Team	Ferrari F40 GT	Ferrari F120B 3.0 L Turbo V8		3	(Spain) Santiago Puig	6
(Italy) Agusta Racing Team	Venturi 500 LM; Venturi 600 LM	Renault PRV 3.0 L Turbo V6	D	55; 31	(France) Pascal Vermesse	1–2
(Italy) Agusta Racing Team	Venturi 500 LM; Venturi 600 LM	Renault PRV 3.0 L Turbo V6	D	55; 31	(Italy) Rocky Agusta	1, 4
(Italy) Agusta Racing Team	Venturi 500 LM; Venturi 600 LM	Renault PRV 3.0 L Turbo V6	D	55; 31	(France) James Sheehan	2
(Italy) Agusta Racing Team	Venturi 500 LM; Venturi 600 LM	Renault PRV 3.0 L Turbo V6	D	55; 31	(Italy) Luigi Taverna	2
(Italy) Agusta Racing Team	Venturi 500 LM; Venturi 600 LM	Renault PRV 3.0 L Turbo V6	D	55; 31	(France) Jean-Claude Basso	3
(Italy) Agusta Racing Team	Venturi 500 LM; Venturi 600 LM	Renault PRV 3.0 L Turbo V6	D	55; 31	(France) Claude Meigemont	3
(Italy) Agusta Racing Team	Venturi 500 LM; Venturi 600 LM	Renault PRV 3.0 L Turbo V6	D	55; 31	(Italy) Almo Coppelli	4
(Italy) Agusta Racing Team	Venturi 500 LM; Venturi 600 LM	Renault PRV 3.0 L Turbo V6	D	55; 31	(Belgium) Philippe Olczyk	4
(Italy) Agusta Racing Team	Venturi 500 LM; Venturi 600 LM	Renault PRV 3.0 L Turbo V6	D	55; 31	(Belgium) Jean-Paul Libert	6
(Italy) Agusta Racing Team	Venturi 500 LM; Venturi 600 LM	Renault PRV 3.0 L Turbo V6	D	55; 31	(Belgium) Hervé Regout	6
(Italy) Agusta Racing Team	Venturi 500 LM; Venturi 600 LM	Renault PRV 3.0 L Turbo V6	D	55; 31	(France) Olivier Grouillard	7–8
(Italy) Agusta Racing Team	Venturi 500 LM; Venturi 600 LM	Renault PRV 3.0 L Turbo V6	D	55; 31	(France) Christophe Bouchut	7–8
(Italy) Agusta Racing Team	Venturi 500 LM; Venturi 600 LM	Renault PRV 3.0 L Turbo V6	D	56	(Belgium) Philippe Olczyk	3
(Italy) Agusta Racing Team	Venturi 500 LM; Venturi 600 LM	Renault PRV 3.0 L Turbo V6	D	56	(Italy) Almo Coppelli	3
(Italy) Agusta Racing Team	Venturi 500 LM; Venturi 600 LM	Renault PRV 3.0 L Turbo V6	D	56	(France) Olivier Grouillard	4–6
(Italy) Agusta Racing Team	Venturi 500 LM; Venturi 600 LM	Renault PRV 3.0 L Turbo V6	D	56	(France) Christophe Bouchut	4–6
(Italy) Agusta Racing Team	Venturi 400 GTR	Renault PRV 3.0 L Turbo V6		65	(Spain) Javier Camp	6
(Italy) Agusta Racing Team	Venturi 400 GTR	Renault PRV 3.0 L Turbo V6		65	(Spain) Antonio Puig	6
(Italy) Agusta Racing Team	Venturi 400 GTR	Renault PRV 3.0 L Turbo V6		65	(Belgium) Philippe Olczyk	6
(France) Pilot Jacadi Racing	Venturi 600 LM	Renault PRV 3.0 L Turbo V6	D M	56; 71	(Belgium) Michel Neugarten	1–6
(France) Pilot Jacadi Racing	Venturi 600 LM	Renault PRV 3.0 L Turbo V6	D M	56; 71	(Belgium) Pascal Witmeur	1
(France) Pilot Jacadi Racing	Venturi 600 LM	Renault PRV 3.0 L Turbo V6	D M	56; 71	(France) Michel Ferté	2–7
(France) Pilot Jacadi Racing	Venturi 600 LM	Renault PRV 3.0 L Turbo V6	D M	56; 71	(France) Éric Hélary	7
(France) Ratel	Venturi 600 LM	Renault PRV 3.0 L Turbo V6		56	(France) Michel Trollé	2
(France) Ratel	Venturi 600 LM	Renault PRV 3.0 L Turbo V6		56	(Belgium) Pascal Witmeur	2
(France) BBA Compétition	Venturi 600 LM	Renault PRV 3.0 L Turbo V6	M	57; 39	(France) Ferdinand de Lesseps	2–8
(France) BBA Compétition	Venturi 600 LM	Renault PRV 3.0 L Turbo V6	M	57; 39	(France) Jacques Tropenat	2–8
(France) BBA Compétition	Venturi 600 LM	Renault PRV 3.0 L Turbo V6	M	57; 39	(France) Jean-Luc Maury-Laribière	4
(France) BBA Compétition	Venturi 600 LM	Renault PRV 3.0 L Turbo V6	M	92; 30	(France) Jean-Luc Maury-Laribière	3, 6–8
(France) BBA Compétition	Venturi 600 LM	Renault PRV 3.0 L Turbo V6	M	92; 30	(France) Patrick Camus	3
(France) BBA Compétition	Venturi 600 LM	Renault PRV 3.0 L Turbo V6	M	92; 30	(France) Hervé Poulain	6–8
(France) BBA Compétition	Venturi 600 LM	Renault PRV 3.0 L Turbo V6	M	92; 30	(France) Bernard Chauvin	6
(France) BBA Compétition	Venturi 600 LM	Renault PRV 3.0 L Turbo V6	M	92; 30	(Japan) Jun Harada	7
(Japan) Team Arnature	Mazda RX-7 GTO	Mazda 13J 3.9 L 4-Rotor	D	74	(Japan) Yojiro Terada	7
(Japan) Team Arnature	Mazda RX-7 GTO	Mazda 13J 3.9 L 4-Rotor	D	74	(Japan) Kaoru Iida	7
(Japan) Team Arnature	Mazda RX-7 GTO	Mazda 13J 3.9 L 4-Rotor	D	74	(France) Franck Fréon	7
(France) Larbre Compétition	Porsche 911 Turbo S LM-GT	Porsche 3.6 L Turbo Flat-6	D M	86	(France) Jean-Pierre Jarier	1–2, 7–8
(France) Larbre Compétition	Porsche 911 Turbo S LM-GT	Porsche 3.6 L Turbo Flat-6	D M	86	(Spain) Jesús Pareja	1–2, 7
(France) Larbre Compétition	Porsche 911 Turbo S LM-GT	Porsche 3.6 L Turbo Flat-6	D M	86	(France) Bob Wollek	1, 7–8
(France) Larbre Compétition	Porsche 911 Turbo S LM-GT	Porsche 3.6 L Turbo Flat-6	D M	86	(France) Dominique Dupuy	2
(France) Larbre Compétition	Porsche 911 Turbo S LM-GT	Porsche 3.6 L Turbo Flat-6	D M	86	(France) Jacques Lafitte	8
(France) Scuderia Pinguini	Porsche 944 Turbo Cup	Porsche 2.5 L Turbo I4		93	(France) Gilles Vannelet	4
(France) Scuderia Pinguini	Porsche 944 Turbo Cup	Porsche 2.5 L Turbo I4		93	(France) Flavian Marçais	4
(France) Scuderia Pinguini	Porsche 944 Turbo Cup	Porsche 2.5 L Turbo I4		93	(France) Jean-François Metz	4
(France) Scuderia Pinguini	Porsche 944 Turbo Cup	Porsche 2.5 L Turbo I4		93	(France) Marc Pachot	4

=== GT3 ===
Entrant	Car	Engine	Tyre	No.	Drivers	Rounds
(United Kingdom) Chamberlain Engineering	Lotus Esprit Sport 300	Lotus Type 910 2.2 L Turbo I4		26; 2	(Germany) Andreas Fuchs	1, 4, 6
(United Kingdom) Chamberlain Engineering	Lotus Esprit Sport 300	Lotus Type 910 2.2 L Turbo I4		26; 2	(Republic of Ireland) David Kennedy	1, 4
(United Kingdom) Chamberlain Engineering	Lotus Esprit Sport 300	Lotus Type 910 2.2 L Turbo I4		26; 2	(Denmark) Thorkild Thyrring	1, 6
(United Kingdom) Chamberlain Engineering	Lotus Esprit Sport 300	Lotus Type 910 2.2 L Turbo I4		26; 2	(France) Jean-Louis Ricci	4
(United Kingdom) Chamberlain Engineering	Lotus Esprit Sport 300	Lotus Type 910 2.2 L Turbo I4		26; 2	(Netherlands) Klaas Zwart	6
(United Kingdom) Chamberlain Engineering	Lotus Esprit Sport 300	Lotus Type 910 2.2 L Turbo I4		26; 2	(Netherlands) Tom Langeberg	7
(United Kingdom) Chamberlain Engineering	Lotus Esprit Sport 300	Lotus Type 910 2.2 L Turbo I4		26; 2	(Japan) Masahiro Kimoto	7
(United Kingdom) Chamberlain Engineering	Lotus Esprit Sport 300	Lotus Type 910 2.2 L Turbo I4		29; 27	(South Africa) Stephen Watson	1, 8
(United Kingdom) Chamberlain Engineering	Lotus Esprit Sport 300	Lotus Type 910 2.2 L Turbo I4		29; 27	(South Africa) George Fouché	1
(United Kingdom) Chamberlain Engineering	Lotus Esprit Sport 300	Lotus Type 910 2.2 L Turbo I4		29; 27	(South Africa) Hilton Cowie	1
(United Kingdom) Chamberlain Engineering	Lotus Esprit Sport 300	Lotus Type 910 2.2 L Turbo I4		29; 27	(Hong Kong) Andrew Topping	8
(Switzerland) Ecurie Biennoise	Porsche 911 Carrera RSR	Porsche 3.8 L Flat-6		30; 33	(Switzerland) Enzo Calderari	1–2
(Switzerland) Ecurie Biennoise	Porsche 911 Carrera RSR	Porsche 3.8 L Flat-6		30; 33	(Switzerland) Lilian Bryner	1–2
(Switzerland) Scuderia Chicco d'Oro (Switzerland) Haberthur Racing	Porsche 911 Carrera RSR	Porsche 3.8 L Flat-6		31; 51; 53	(Switzerland) Olivier Haberthur	1–4, 6–8
(Switzerland) Scuderia Chicco d'Oro (Switzerland) Haberthur Racing	Porsche 911 Carrera RSR	Porsche 3.8 L Flat-6		31; 51; 53	(Belgium) Philippe Olczyk	1–2
(Switzerland) Scuderia Chicco d'Oro (Switzerland) Haberthur Racing	Porsche 911 Carrera RSR	Porsche 3.8 L Flat-6		31; 51; 53	(France) Richard Balandras	3–4, 6–7
(Switzerland) Scuderia Chicco d'Oro (Switzerland) Haberthur Racing	Porsche 911 Carrera RSR	Porsche 3.8 L Flat-6		31; 51; 53	(France) Frédéric Dedours	4, 7
(Switzerland) Scuderia Chicco d'Oro (Switzerland) Haberthur Racing	Porsche 911 Carrera RSR	Porsche 3.8 L Flat-6		31; 51; 53	(Switzerland) Christian Haberthur	6, 8
(Switzerland) Scuderia Chicco d'Oro (Switzerland) Haberthur Racing	Porsche 911 Carrera RSR	Porsche 3.8 L Flat-6		31; 51; 53	(Switzerland) Laurent Lécuyer	8
(Switzerland) Scuderia Chicco d'Oro (Switzerland) Haberthur Racing	Porsche 911 Carrera RSR	Porsche 3.8 L Flat-6		59	(Switzerland) Peter Zbinden	6
(Switzerland) Scuderia Chicco d'Oro (Switzerland) Haberthur Racing	Porsche 911 Carrera RSR	Porsche 3.8 L Flat-6		59	(Switzerland) Uwe Sick	6
(United Kingdom) Bristow Motorsport	Porsche 911 Carrera RSR	Porsche 3.8 L Flat-6	G	34	(United Kingdom) Ray Bellm	1–6
(United Kingdom) Bristow Motorsport	Porsche 911 Carrera RSR	Porsche 3.8 L Flat-6	G	34	(United Kingdom) Ian Khan	1
(United Kingdom) Bristow Motorsport	Porsche 911 Carrera RSR	Porsche 3.8 L Flat-6	G	34	(United Kingdom) Harry Nuttall	2–6
(United Kingdom) Bristow Motorsport	Porsche 911 Carrera RSR	Porsche 3.8 L Flat-6	G	34	(United Kingdom) Charles Rickett	4–5
(Germany) Seikel Motorsport	Porsche 968 Turbo RS	Porsche 3.0 L Turbo I4		36; 58	(Germany) Thomas Bscher	4–6
(Germany) Seikel Motorsport	Porsche 968 Turbo RS	Porsche 3.0 L Turbo I4		36; 58	(Denmark) John Nielsen	4–6
(Germany) Seikel Motorsport	Porsche 968 Turbo RS	Porsche 3.0 L Turbo I4		36; 58	(United Kingdom) Lindsay Owen-Jones	4
(Germany) Seikel Motorsport	Porsche 911 Carrera RSR	Porsche 3.8 L Flat-6		39; 60	(Italy) Giuseppe Quargentan	1, 3–6
(Germany) Seikel Motorsport	Porsche 911 Carrera RSR	Porsche 3.8 L Flat-6		39; 60	(Italy) Girolamo Capra	1, 3–4, 6
(Germany) Seikel Motorsport	Porsche 911 Carrera RSR	Porsche 3.8 L Flat-6		39; 60	(France) Philippe Auvray	4, 6
(Germany) Seikel Motorsport	Porsche 911 Carrera RSR	Porsche 3.8 L Flat-6		39; 60	(Italy) Toni Merendino	5
(France) V de V Racing Team	Porsche 911 Carrera RSR	Porsche 3.8 L Flat-6		37	(France) Eric van de Vyver	1, 3
(France) V de V Racing Team	Porsche 911 Carrera RSR	Porsche 3.8 L Flat-6		37	(France) Bruno Brignati	1, 3
(France) V de V Racing Team	Porsche 911 Carrera RSR	Porsche 3.8 L Flat-6		37	(France) Benjamin Roy	3
(Norway) Mulsanne Racing RSR Motorsport	Porsche 968 Turbo RS	Porsche 3.0 L Turbo I4	D	38	(Norway) Erik Henriksen	1–5
(Norway) Mulsanne Racing RSR Motorsport	Porsche 968 Turbo RS	Porsche 3.0 L Turbo I4	D	38	(United Kingdom) Justin Bell	1–5
(Norway) Mulsanne Racing RSR Motorsport	Porsche 968 Turbo RS	Porsche 3.0 L Turbo I4	D	38	(New Zealand) Bill Farmer	4
(Norway) Mulsanne Racing RSR Motorsport	Porsche 968 Turbo RS	Porsche 3.0 L Turbo I4	D	38	(Germany) Detlef Hübner	5
(Germany) Konrad Motorsport	Porsche 911 Carrera RSR	Porsche 3.8 L Flat-6	P	40; 41; 42	(Austria) Franz Konrad	1
(Germany) Konrad Motorsport	Porsche 911 Carrera RSR	Porsche 3.8 L Flat-6	P	40; 41; 42	(Sweden) Örnulf Wirdheim	1
(Germany) Konrad Motorsport	Porsche 911 Carrera RSR	Porsche 3.8 L Flat-6	P	40; 41; 42	(France) Alex de Lesseps	2–3
(Germany) Konrad Motorsport	Porsche 911 Carrera RSR	Porsche 3.8 L Flat-6	P	40; 41; 42	(Germany) Peter Schem	2, 6
(Germany) Konrad Motorsport	Porsche 911 Carrera RSR	Porsche 3.8 L Flat-6	P	40; 41; 42	(France) Pierre de Thoisy	3
(Germany) Konrad Motorsport	Porsche 911 Carrera RSR	Porsche 3.8 L Flat-6	P	40; 41; 42	(Italy) Giorgio Rebai	4
(Germany) Konrad Motorsport	Porsche 911 Carrera RSR	Porsche 3.8 L Flat-6	P	40; 41; 42	(United States) Dirk Layer	4
(Germany) Konrad Motorsport	Porsche 911 Carrera RSR	Porsche 3.8 L Flat-6	P	40; 41; 42	(Slovenia) Matjaz Tomlje	4
(Germany) Konrad Motorsport	Porsche 911 Carrera RSR	Porsche 3.8 L Flat-6	P	40; 41; 42	(Germany) Bernd Netzeband	6
(Germany) Konrad Motorsport	Porsche 911 Carrera RSR	Porsche 3.8 L Flat-6	P	40; 41; 42	(Netherlands) Bert Ploeg	7
(Germany) Konrad Motorsport	Porsche 911 Carrera RSR	Porsche 3.8 L Flat-6	P	40; 41; 42	(Sweden) Mikael Gustavsson	7
(Germany) Konrad Motorsport	Porsche 911 Carrera RSR	Porsche 3.8 L Flat-6	P	40; 41; 42	(Spain) Alfonso de Orléans-Borbón	7
(Germany) Konrad Motorsport	Porsche 911 Carrera RSR	Porsche 3.8 L Flat-6	P	40; 41; 42	(Canada) Ira Storfer	8
(Germany) Konrad Motorsport	Porsche 911 Carrera RSR	Porsche 3.8 L Flat-6	P	40; 41; 42	(Germany) Franz Prangemeier	8
(France) Scuderia Pinguini	Porsche 944 Turbo Cup	Porsche 2.5 L Turbo I4		43; 4	(France) Flavian Marçais	1, 3, 6
(France) Scuderia Pinguini	Porsche 944 Turbo Cup	Porsche 2.5 L Turbo I4		43; 4	(France) Michel Renavand	1, 3, 6
(France) Scuderia Pinguini	Porsche 944 Turbo Cup	Porsche 2.5 L Turbo I4		43; 4	(France) Laurent Bleivas	6
(France) Crisal Compétition	Porsche 911 Carrera RS Cup	Porsche 3.6 L Flat-6	D	46	(France) Jérôme Brarda	1–3
(France) Crisal Compétition	Porsche 911 Carrera RS Cup	Porsche 3.6 L Flat-6	D	46	(France) Thiérry Guiod	1–3
(France) Crisal Compétition	Porsche 911 Carrera RS Cup	Porsche 3.6 L Flat-6	D	46	(France) Éric Bernard	1
(France) Larbre Compétition	Porsche 911 Carrera RSR	Porsche 3.8 L Flat-6	D	47	(France) Jack Leconte	1, 7–8
(France) Larbre Compétition	Porsche 911 Carrera RSR	Porsche 3.8 L Flat-6	D	47	(France) Dominique Dupuy	1
(France) Larbre Compétition	Porsche 911 Carrera RSR	Porsche 3.8 L Flat-6	D	47	(Germany) Jürgen Barth	7
(France) Larbre Compétition	Porsche 911 Carrera RSR	Porsche 3.8 L Flat-6	D	47	(France) Jean-Luc Chéreau	8
(France) Touroul	Porsche 911 Carrera RSR	Porsche 3.8 L Flat-6		48; 8	(France) Raymond Touroul	1, 3–5
(France) Touroul	Porsche 911 Carrera RSR	Porsche 3.8 L Flat-6		48; 8	(France) Steeve Hiesse	1
(France) Touroul	Porsche 911 Carrera RSR	Porsche 3.8 L Flat-6		48; 8	(France) "Granpa"	1
(France) Touroul	Porsche 911 Carrera RSR	Porsche 3.8 L Flat-6		48; 8	(France) Dominique Lacaud	3
(France) Touroul	Porsche 911 Carrera RSR	Porsche 3.8 L Flat-6		48; 8	(France) Jean-Pierre Tardiff	4
(France) Touroul	Porsche 911 Carrera RSR	Porsche 3.8 L Flat-6		48; 8	(France) Jean-Claude Lagniez	4
(France) Touroul	Porsche 911 Carrera RSR	Porsche 3.8 L Flat-6		48; 8	(France) Eric van de Vyver	5

== Season results ==
1994 BPR International GT Endurance Series Results
Rnd	Circuit	Overall Winning Team	Report
Rnd	Circuit	Overall Winning Drivers	Report
1	Paul Ricard	(France) No. 86 Larbre Compétition	Report
1	Paul Ricard	(France) Bob Wollek (France) Jean-Pierre Jarier (Spain) Jesús Pareja	Report
2	Jarama	(France) No. 86 Larbre Compétition	Report
2	Jarama	(France) Dominique Dupuy (France) Jean-Pierre Jarier (Spain) Jesús Pareja	Report
3	Dijon	(France) No. 74 Pilot Jacadi Racing	Report
3	Dijon	(France) Michel Ferté (Belgium) Michel Neugarten	Report
4	Montlhéry	(France) No. 43 JCB Racing	Report
4	Montlhéry	(France) Jean-Claude Basso (France) Henri Pescarolo	Report
5	Vallelunga	(Sweden) No. 40 Strandell	Report
5	Vallelunga	(Sweden) Anders Olofsson (Italy) Luciano Della Noce	Report
6	Spa-Francorchamps	(France) No. 74 Pilot Jacadi Racing	Report
6	Spa-Francorchamps	(France) Michel Ferté (Belgium) Michel Neugarten	Report
7	Suzuka	(France) No. 86 Larbre Compétition	Report
7	Suzuka	(France) Bob Wollek (France) Jean-Pierre Jarier (Spain) Jesús Pareja	Report
8	Zhuhai	(France) No. 86 Larbre Compétition	Report
8	Zhuhai	(France) Bob Wollek (France) Jean-Pierre Jarier (France) Jacques Laffite	Report
