= Lucchini SP91 =

Prototype racing car

- Category: LMP

Technical specifications
- Chassis: Carbon fiber and aluminum honeycomb monocoque chassis
- Suspension: Unequal length wishbones, pushrod actuated coil springs over shock absorbers, inboard rocker arms
- Length: 4,500 mm (180 in)
- Width: 1,900 mm (75 in)
- Engine: Alfa Romeo 3.0 L (183.1 cu in) 60° DOHC V6 naturally-aspirated mid-engined BMW 3.0 L (183.1 cu in) DOHC I6 naturally-aspirated mid-engined 3.0 L (183.1 cu in) 60° DOHC V6, naturally-aspirated, mid-engined
- Transmission: manual
- Power: 315 hp (235 kW)
- Weight: 659 kg (1,453 lb)

Competition history

The Lucchini SP91 is a sports prototype race car, designed, developed, and built by Italian manufacturer Lucchini Engineering, for sports car racing, conforming to the LMP rules and regulations, in 1991. A total of 3 models were produced.
