= Bruno Ilien =

French racing driver (born 1959)

Bruno Ilien (born 7 May 1959) is a French former racing driver who competed in the 24 Hours of Le Mans in 1984, 1993, and 1996.
