= Éric Graham =

French racing driver (born 1950)

Éric Graham (born 7 August 1950) is a French former racing driver.
